= 1945 Hondo Army Air Field Comets football team =

American college football season

1945 Hondo Army Air Field Comets football
- Conference: Independent
- Record: 6–4–1
- Head coach: Bob Coe (1st season)
- Home stadium: Barry Stadium

1945 military service football records
	Conf.					Overall
Team	W		L		T	W		L		T
Army Air Forces League
Third Air Force +	4	–	1	–	1	7	–	2	–	1
AAF Training Command +	4	–	1	–	1	8	–	3	–	1
Fourth Air Force	3	–	2	–	1	6	–	3	–	1
First Air Force	2	–	2	–	2	3	–	2	–	3
Air Transport Command	2	–	3	–	1	6	–	3	–	2
Personnel Distribution Command	2	–	4	–	0	6	–	5	–	0
Second Air Force	1	–	5	–	0	3	–	7	–	0
Independents
Fleet City			–			11	–	0	–	1
Jacksonville NAS			–			9	–	2	–	0
Hutchinson NAS			–			8	–	0	–	0
Selman Field			–			8	–	1	–	0
El Toro Marines			–			8	–	2	–	0
Corpus Christi NAS			–			7	–	1	–	0
North Camp Hood			–			7	–	1	–	0
Little Creek			–			7	–	2	–	0
Santa Barbara Marines			–			7	–	3	–	1
Camp Lee			–			7	–	4	–	0
Camp Beale			–			6	–	1	–	2
Farragut NTS			–			6	–	2	–	0
Eastern Flying Training Command			–			6	–	3	–	1
Great Lakes Navy			–			6	–	4	–	1
Hondo AAF			–			6	–	4	–	1
South Camp Hood			–			5	–	2	–	0
Camp Peary			–			5	–	3	–	0
Bainbridge			–			5	–	4	–	0
Fort Benning			–			5	–	4	–	1
Fort Warren			–			5	–	7	–	0
Fort McClellan			–			4	–	2	–	0
San Diego NTS			–			4	–	2	–	0
Atlantic City NAS			–			4	–	2	–	1
Minter Field			–			4	–	2	–	1
Williams Field			–			4	–	4	–	0
Stockton AAF			–			4	–	5	–	2
Barksdale Field			–			4	–	7	–	0
Fort Pierce			–			4	–	9	–	0
Amarillo AAF			–			3	–	1	–	0
Olathe NAS			–			3	–	2	–	0
Albany Navy			–			3	–	3	–	1
Camp Detrick			–			3	–	4	–	0
Kearney AAF			–			3	–	4	–	0
Bergstrom Field			–			3	–	5	–	1
Keesler Field			–			3	–	6	–	1
Melville PT Boats			–			2	–	1	–	0
Great Bend AAF			–			2	–	4	–	0
Saint Mary's Pre-Flight			–			2	–	4	–	1
Gulfport AAF			–			2	–	5	–	0
Pensacola NAS			–			2	–	7	–	1
Squantum NAS			–			1	–	1	–	0
Camp Blanding			–			1	–	2	–	0
Luke Field			–			1	–	2	–	0
Miami NAS			–			1	–	2	–	0
Miami NTC			–			1	–	3	–	0
NSB New London			–			1	–	3	–	0
Oceana NAS			–			1	–	3	–	0
Fort Riley			–			1	–	4	–	0
Lake Charles AAF			–			1	–	4	–	0
Ellington Field			–			1	–	4	–	1
Cherry Point Marines			–			1	–	8	–	0
Dalhart AAF			–			0	–	3	–	0
Homestead AAB			–			0	–	3	–	0
Fort Monroe			–			0	–	7	–	0
+ – Conference co-champions

The 1945 Hondo Army Air Field Comets football team represented the United States Army Air Force's Hondo Army Air Field (Hondo AAF) in Hondo, Texas during the 1945 college football season. Led by head coach Bob Coe, the Comets compiled a record of 6–4–1.

Hondo AAF ranked 84th among the nation's college and service teams in the final Litkenhous Ratings.

== Schedule ==
Date	Time	Opponent	Site	Result	Attendance	Source
September 15		Ellington Field	Hondo, TX	T 7–7	2,500	
September 22	2:30 p.m.	at Oklahoma	Owen Field; Norman, OK	L 6–21	10,000	
October 5		at Bergstrom Field	House Park; Austin, TX	L 13–15		
October 12	8:00 p.m.	Great Bend AAF	Barry Stadium; Hondo, TX	W 27–0		
October 20	2:00 p.m.	vs. Fort Warren	Creighton Stadium; Omaha, NE	L 26–28		
October 28		at Ellington Field	Houston, TX	W 7–6	1,600	
November 2		Camp Swift	Barry Stadium; Hondo, TX	W 19–0		
November 10	12:00 p.m.	at Santa Barbara Marines	La Playa Stadium; Santa Barbara, CA	W 13–7		
November 17		North Texas Aggies	Hondo, TX	W 12–0		
November 24		vs. Southwestern (TX)	Big Spring, TX	W 19–7	3,000	
December 1	2:00 p.m.	at No. 14 Tulsa	Skelly Field; Tulsa, OK	L 18–20	6,000	
Rankings from AP Poll released prior to the game; All times are in Central time
