= 1945 Corpus Christi Naval Air Station Comets football team =

American college football season

1945 Corpus Christi Naval Air Station Comets football
- Conference: Independent
- Record: 7–1
- Head coach: Larry Mullins (1st season)
- Home stadium: Buccaneer Stadium

1945 military service football records
	Conf.					Overall
Team	W		L		T	W		L		T
Army Air Forces League
Third Air Force +	4	–	1	–	1	7	–	2	–	1
AAF Training Command +	4	–	1	–	1	8	–	3	–	1
Fourth Air Force	3	–	2	–	1	6	–	3	–	1
First Air Force	2	–	2	–	2	3	–	2	–	3
Air Transport Command	2	–	3	–	1	6	–	3	–	2
Personnel Distribution Command	2	–	4	–	0	6	–	5	–	0
Second Air Force	1	–	5	–	0	3	–	7	–	0
Independents
Fleet City			–			11	–	0	–	1
Jacksonville NAS			–			9	–	2	–	0
Hutchinson NAS			–			8	–	0	–	0
Selman Field			–			8	–	1	–	0
El Toro Marines			–			8	–	2	–	0
Corpus Christi NAS			–			7	–	1	–	0
North Camp Hood			–			7	–	1	–	0
Little Creek			–			7	–	2	–	0
Santa Barbara Marines			–			7	–	3	–	1
Camp Lee			–			7	–	4	–	0
Camp Beale			–			6	–	1	–	2
Farragut NTS			–			6	–	2	–	0
Eastern Flying Training Command			–			6	–	3	–	1
Great Lakes Navy			–			6	–	4	–	1
Hondo AAF			–			6	–	4	–	1
South Camp Hood			–			5	–	2	–	0
Camp Peary			–			5	–	3	–	0
Bainbridge			–			5	–	4	–	0
Fort Benning			–			5	–	4	–	1
Fort Warren			–			5	–	7	–	0
Fort McClellan			–			4	–	2	–	0
San Diego NTS			–			4	–	2	–	0
Atlantic City NAS			–			4	–	2	–	1
Minter Field			–			4	–	2	–	1
Williams Field			–			4	–	4	–	0
Stockton AAF			–			4	–	5	–	2
Barksdale Field			–			4	–	7	–	0
Fort Pierce			–			4	–	9	–	0
Amarillo AAF			–			3	–	1	–	0
Olathe NAS			–			3	–	2	–	0
Albany Navy			–			3	–	3	–	1
Camp Detrick			–			3	–	4	–	0
Kearney AAF			–			3	–	4	–	0
Bergstrom Field			–			3	–	5	–	1
Keesler Field			–			3	–	6	–	1
Melville PT Boats			–			2	–	1	–	0
Great Bend AAF			–			2	–	4	–	0
Saint Mary's Pre-Flight			–			2	–	4	–	1
Gulfport AAF			–			2	–	5	–	0
Pensacola NAS			–			2	–	7	–	1
Squantum NAS			–			1	–	1	–	0
Camp Blanding			–			1	–	2	–	0
Luke Field			–			1	–	2	–	0
Miami NAS			–			1	–	2	–	0
Miami NTC			–			1	–	3	–	0
NSB New London			–			1	–	3	–	0
Oceana NAS			–			1	–	3	–	0
Fort Riley			–			1	–	4	–	0
Lake Charles AAF			–			1	–	4	–	0
Ellington Field			–			1	–	4	–	1
Cherry Point Marines			–			1	–	8	–	0
Dalhart AAF			–			0	–	3	–	0
Homestead AAB			–			0	–	3	–	0
Fort Monroe			–			0	–	7	–	0
+ – Conference co-champions

The 1945 Corpus Christi Naval Air Station Comets football team represented the United States Navy's Naval Air Station Corpus Christi during the 1945 college football season. Led by head coach Larry Mullins, the Comets compiled a record of 7–1. Lt. Cmdr. Mullins' coaching staff consisted of Lt. Cmdr. Johnny Vaught, Lt. John Michelosen, Lt. A. A. Weigle, and Lt. (jg) Jim Cavan. Jim Youel was the team starting quarterback. The Comets played home games at Buccaneer Stadium in Corpus Christi, Texas.

The Corpus Christi NAS Comets were ranked 32nd among the nation's college and service teams in the final Litkenhous Ratings.

== Schedule ==
Date	Time	Opponent	Site	Result	Attendance	Source
September 22		at Rice	Rice Field; Houston, TX	W 26–13	12,000	
September 29	8:00 p.m.	SMU	Buccaneer Stadium; Corpus Christi, TX	W 22–7	16,000	
October 6		at Jacksonville NAS	Municipal Stadium; Jacksonville, FL	L 7–35		
October 13		at Bergstrom Field	Memorial Stadium; Austin, TX	W 39–0		
October 20		Pensacola NAS	Buccaneer Stadium; Corpus Christi, TX	W 39–0	14,000	
October 28		at Pensacola NAS	Air Station Field; Pensacola, FL	W 26–6	10,000	
November 10		Jacksonville NAS	Buccaneer Stadium; Corpus Christi, TX	W 13–14		
November 24		Barksdale Field	Buccaneer Stadium; Corpus Christi, TX	W 21–6	8,000	
All times are in Central time
