= 1945 Oregon Ducks football team =

American college football season

1945 Oregon Ducks football
- Conference: Pacific Coast Conference
- Record: 3–6 (3–6 PCC)
- Head coach: Tex Oliver (5th season)
- Captain: Jake Leicht
- Home stadium: Hayward Field, Multnomah Stadium

1945 Pacific Coast Conference football standings
	Conf.					Overall
Team	W		L		T	W		L		T
No. 11 USC $	5	–	1	–	0	7	–	4	–	0
Washington State	6	–	2	–	1	6	–	2	–	1
Washington	6	–	3	–	0	6	–	3	–	0
Oregon State	4	–	4	–	0	4	–	4	–	1
UCLA	2	–	3	–	0	5	–	4	–	0
California	2	–	4	–	1	4	–	5	–	1
Oregon	3	–	6	–	0	3	–	6	–	0
Idaho	1	–	5	–	0	1	–	7	–	0
Montana	0	–	1	–	0	1	–	4	–	0
$ – Conference champion; Rankings from AP Poll

The 1945 Oregon Ducks football team represented the University of Oregon as a member of the Pacific Coast Conference (PCC) during the 1945 college football season. In their fifth season under head coach Tex Oliver, the Ducks compiled a 3–6 record, finished in fourth place in the PCC, and were outscored 124 to 116. The season marked the resumption of play after the conclusion of World War II; Oregon last fielded a team in 1942 and Oliver last coached them in 1941.

Three home games were played on campus at Hayward Field in Eugene and one at Multnomah Stadium in Portland.

== Schedule ==
Date	Time	Opponent	Site	Result	Attendance	Source
September 29		at Washington	Husky Stadium; Seattle, WA (rivalry)	L 6–20	32,000	
October 6		Idaho	Hayward Field; Eugene, OR	W 33–7	6,000	
October 13		at Oregon State	Bell Field; Corvallis, OR (rivalry)	L 6–19	18,000–20,000	
October 20		Washington State	Hayward Field; Eugene, OR	W 26–13	6,500	
October 26	8:30 p.m.	at UCLA	Los Angeles Memorial Coliseum; Los Angeles, CA	L 0–12	40,000	
November 3		No. 19 Washington	Multnomah Stadium; Portland, OR (rivalry)	L 0–7	28,194	
November 10		at Washington State	Rogers Field; Pullman, WA	L 13–20	7,000	
November 17		at California	California Memorial Stadium; Berkeley, CA	W 20–13	35,000	
December 1		Oregon State	Hayward Field; Eugene, OR	L 12–13	11,000	
Rankings from AP Poll released prior to the game; All times are in Pacific time; Source:
