= 1945 Army Air Forces Training Command Skymasters football team =

American college football season

1945 Army Air Forces Training Command Skymasters football

AAF League co-champion

Legion Bowl, L 0–27 vs. Fourth Air Force
- Conference: Army Air Forces League
- Record: 8–3–1 (4–1–1 AAF League)
- Head coach: Doug Fessenden (1st season)
- Home stadium: Farrington Field

1945 military service football records
	Conf.					Overall
Team	W		L		T	W		L		T
Army Air Forces League
Third Air Force +	4	–	1	–	1	7	–	2	–	1
AAF Training Command +	4	–	1	–	1	8	–	3	–	1
Fourth Air Force	3	–	2	–	1	6	–	3	–	1
First Air Force	2	–	2	–	2	3	–	2	–	3
Air Transport Command	2	–	3	–	1	6	–	3	–	2
Personnel Distribution Command	2	–	4	–	0	6	–	5	–	0
Second Air Force	1	–	5	–	0	3	–	7	–	0
Independents
Fleet City			–			11	–	0	–	1
Jacksonville NAS			–			9	–	2	–	0
Hutchinson NAS			–			8	–	0	–	0
Selman Field			–			8	–	1	–	0
El Toro Marines			–			8	–	2	–	0
Corpus Christi NAS			–			7	–	1	–	0
North Camp Hood			–			7	–	1	–	0
Little Creek			–			7	–	2	–	0
Santa Barbara Marines			–			7	–	3	–	1
Camp Lee			–			7	–	4	–	0
Camp Beale			–			6	–	1	–	2
Farragut NTS			–			6	–	2	–	0
Eastern Flying Training Command			–			6	–	3	–	1
Great Lakes Navy			–			6	–	4	–	1
Hondo AAF			–			6	–	4	–	1
South Camp Hood			–			5	–	2	–	0
Camp Peary			–			5	–	3	–	0
Bainbridge			–			5	–	4	–	0
Fort Benning			–			5	–	4	–	1
Fort Warren			–			5	–	7	–	0
Fort McClellan			–			4	–	2	–	0
San Diego NTS			–			4	–	2	–	0
Atlantic City NAS			–			4	–	2	–	1
Minter Field			–			4	–	2	–	1
Williams Field			–			4	–	4	–	0
Stockton AAF			–			4	–	5	–	2
Barksdale Field			–			4	–	7	–	0
Fort Pierce			–			4	–	9	–	0
Amarillo AAF			–			3	–	1	–	0
Olathe NAS			–			3	–	2	–	0
Albany Navy			–			3	–	3	–	1
Camp Detrick			–			3	–	4	–	0
Kearney AAF			–			3	–	4	–	0
Bergstrom Field			–			3	–	5	–	1
Keesler Field			–			3	–	6	–	1
Melville PT Boats			–			2	–	1	–	0
Great Bend AAF			–			2	–	4	–	0
Saint Mary's Pre-Flight			–			2	–	4	–	1
Gulfport AAF			–			2	–	5	–	0
Pensacola NAS			–			2	–	7	–	1
Squantum NAS			–			1	–	1	–	0
Camp Blanding			–			1	–	2	–	0
Luke Field			–			1	–	2	–	0
Miami NAS			–			1	–	2	–	0
Miami NTC			–			1	–	3	–	0
NSB New London			–			1	–	3	–	0
Oceana NAS			–			1	–	3	–	0
Fort Riley			–			1	–	4	–	0
Lake Charles AAF			–			1	–	4	–	0
Ellington Field			–			1	–	4	–	1
Cherry Point Marines			–			1	–	8	–	0
Dalhart AAF			–			0	–	3	–	0
Homestead AAB			–			0	–	3	–	0
Fort Monroe			–			0	–	7	–	0
+ – Conference co-champions

The 1945 Army Air Forces Training Command Skymasters football team represented the Army Air Forces Training Command (AAFTC) based in Fort Worth, Texas during the 1945 college football season. The Skymasters competed in the Army Air Forces League (AAF League) with six others teams from the United States Army Air Forces. The Skymasters compiled an overall record of 8–3–1 with a mark of 4–1–1 in league play, sharing the AAF League title with the Third Air Force Gremlins. Major Doug Fessenden was the team's head coach. Captain Berl Huffman served as backfield coach.

The AAFTC Skymasters were ranked sixth among the nation's college and service teams in the final Litkenhous Ratings, behind Army, Navy, Alabama, Fleet City, and El Toro Marines.

== Schedule ==
Date	Time	Opponent	Site	Result	Attendance	Source
September 23		Keesler Field*	Farrington Field; Fort Worth, TX	W 29–0	15,000	
September 30	2:30 p.m.	Fort Benning*	Farrington Field; Fort Worth, TX	W 27–0	10,000	
October 7	2:00 p.m.	at Fort Pierce*	Burdine Stadium; Miami, FL	W 19–7	10,000	
October 13	2:30 p.m.	at Air Transport Command	Dudley Field; Nashville, TN	W 14–0	7,500	
October 22	2:30 p.m.	Fourth Air Force	Farrington Field; Fort Worth, TX	W 19–7	13,000	
October 28		at El Toro Marines*	Los Angeles Memorial Coliseum; Los Angeles, CA	L 0–7	30,000	
November 11		at First Air Force	Ebbets Field; Brooklyn, NY (Brooklyn Bond Bowl)	L 6–24	12,515	
November 18	1:30 p.m.	at Third Air Force	Phillips Field; Tampa, FL	T 7–7	10,000	
November 25	2:30 p.m.	Eastern Flying Training Command*	Farrington Field; Fort Worth, TX	W 45–7	7,000	
December 2		Second Air Force	Farrington Field; Fort Worth, TX	W 37–7	30,000	
December 9		vs. Personnel Distribution Command	Alamo Stadium; San Antonio, TX	W 14–0	6,546	
December 16	2:00 p.m.	vs. Fourth Air Force*	Crump Stadium; Memphis, TN (Legion Bowl)	L 0–27	6,000	
*Non-conference game; All times are in Central time
