= 1945 Farragut Naval Training Station Bluejackets football team =

American college football season

1945 Farragut Naval Training Station Bluejackets football
- Conference: Independent
- Record: 6–2
- Head coach: J. C. Wofford
- Captains: Charles Newman; Bill McDonald
- Home stadium: Main drill field

1945 military service football records
	Conf.					Overall
Team	W		L		T	W		L		T
Army Air Forces League
Third Air Force +	4	–	1	–	1	7	–	2	–	1
AAF Training Command +	4	–	1	–	1	8	–	3	–	1
Fourth Air Force	3	–	2	–	1	6	–	3	–	1
First Air Force	2	–	2	–	2	3	–	2	–	3
Air Transport Command	2	–	3	–	1	6	–	3	–	2
Personnel Distribution Command	2	–	4	–	0	6	–	5	–	0
Second Air Force	1	–	5	–	0	3	–	7	–	0
Independents
Fleet City			–			11	–	0	–	1
Jacksonville NAS			–			9	–	2	–	0
Hutchinson NAS			–			8	–	0	–	0
Selman Field			–			8	–	1	–	0
El Toro Marines			–			8	–	2	–	0
Corpus Christi NAS			–			7	–	1	–	0
North Camp Hood			–			7	–	1	–	0
Little Creek			–			7	–	2	–	0
Santa Barbara Marines			–			7	–	3	–	1
Camp Lee			–			7	–	4	–	0
Camp Beale			–			6	–	1	–	2
Farragut NTS			–			6	–	2	–	0
Eastern Flying Training Command			–			6	–	3	–	1
Great Lakes Navy			–			6	–	4	–	1
Hondo AAF			–			6	–	4	–	1
South Camp Hood			–			5	–	2	–	0
Camp Peary			–			5	–	3	–	0
Bainbridge			–			5	–	4	–	0
Fort Benning			–			5	–	4	–	1
Fort Warren			–			5	–	7	–	0
Fort McClellan			–			4	–	2	–	0
San Diego NTS			–			4	–	2	–	0
Atlantic City NAS			–			4	–	2	–	1
Minter Field			–			4	–	2	–	1
Williams Field			–			4	–	4	–	0
Stockton AAF			–			4	–	5	–	2
Barksdale Field			–			4	–	7	–	0
Fort Pierce			–			4	–	9	–	0
Amarillo AAF			–			3	–	1	–	0
Olathe NAS			–			3	–	2	–	0
Albany Navy			–			3	–	3	–	1
Camp Detrick			–			3	–	4	–	0
Kearney AAF			–			3	–	4	–	0
Bergstrom Field			–			3	–	5	–	1
Keesler Field			–			3	–	6	–	1
Melville PT Boats			–			2	–	1	–	0
Great Bend AAF			–			2	–	4	–	0
Saint Mary's Pre-Flight			–			2	–	4	–	1
Gulfport AAF			–			2	–	5	–	0
Pensacola NAS			–			2	–	7	–	1
Squantum NAS			–			1	–	1	–	0
Camp Blanding			–			1	–	2	–	0
Luke Field			–			1	–	2	–	0
Miami NAS			–			1	–	2	–	0
Miami NTC			–			1	–	3	–	0
NSB New London			–			1	–	3	–	0
Oceana NAS			–			1	–	3	–	0
Fort Riley			–			1	–	4	–	0
Lake Charles AAF			–			1	–	4	–	0
Ellington Field			–			1	–	4	–	1
Cherry Point Marines			–			1	–	8	–	0
Dalhart AAF			–			0	–	3	–	0
Homestead AAB			–			0	–	3	–	0
Fort Monroe			–			0	–	7	–	0
+ – Conference co-champions

The 1945 Farragut Naval Training Station Bluejackets football team represented the United States Navy's Farragut Naval Training Station (Farragut NYS) in Idaho during the 1945 college football season. Led by head coach J. C. Wofford, the Bluejackets compiled a record of 6–2. Ends Charles Newman and Bill McDonald were elected team captains.

Farragut NTS was ranked 181st among the nation's college and service teams in the final Litkenhous Ratings.

== Schedule ==
Date	Time	Opponent	Site	Result	Attendance	Source
October 7		vs. Pocatello Marines	Butte, MT	W 36–0		
October 13		at Idaho	Neale Stadium; Moscow, ID	W 18–7	3,500	
October 27		Montana	Farragut, ID	W 13–21	5,500	
November 4		at Fort Warren	Cheyenne, WY	L 0–27		
November 10		Idaho	Farragut, ID	W 14–6		
November 17	2:00 p.m.	Bremerton Rockets	Main drill field; Farragut, ID	W 33–0	1,000	
November 22		at Montana	Dornblaser Field; Missoula, MT	W 18–13	4,000	
December 1	1:30 p.m.	vs. Fort Lewis	Gonzaga Stadium; Spokane, WA	L 7–13	5,000	
All times are in Pacific time
