= 1945 Washington Huskies football team =

American college football season

1945 Washington Huskies football
- Conference: Pacific Coast Conference
- Record: 6–3 (6–3 PCC)
- Head coach: Ralph Welch (4th season)
- Captain: Bill McGovern
- Home stadium: University of Washington Stadium

1945 Pacific Coast Conference football standings
	Conf.					Overall
Team	W		L		T	W		L		T
No. 11 USC $	5	–	1	–	0	7	–	4	–	0
Washington State	6	–	2	–	1	6	–	2	–	1
Washington	6	–	3	–	0	6	–	3	–	0
Oregon State	4	–	4	–	0	4	–	4	–	1
UCLA	2	–	3	–	0	5	–	4	–	0
California	2	–	4	–	1	4	–	5	–	1
Oregon	3	–	6	–	0	3	–	6	–	0
Idaho	1	–	5	–	0	1	–	7	–	0
Montana	0	–	1	–	0	1	–	4	–	0
$ – Conference champion; Rankings from AP Poll

The 1945 Washington Huskies football team represented the University of Washington in the Pacific Coast Conference (PCC) during the 1945 college football season. Home games were played on campus in Seattle at Husky Stadium, known at the time as University of Washington Stadium.

Under fourth-year head coach Ralph Welch, the Huskies were 6–3, third in the PCC, and outscored its opponents 91 to 54. No non-conference games were played this season and center Bill McGovern was the team captain.

After a two-year hiatus due to World War II, in-state rival Washington State resumed its program and was played twice. The games were split, with home team wins in shutouts in Seattle in October, and in Pullman at the end of the season. The Cougars had last fielded a team in 1942.

Oregon and Oregon State were also played twice, in Seattle and Portland. The Huskies swept Oregon, but split with Oregon State, with the visiting teams prevailing. The Huskies upset USC 13–7 in Seattle, the Trojans' only PCC loss. UCLA was not on the schedule this season, and Stanford did not field a team from 1943 through 1945.

== Schedule ==
Date	Opponent	Rank	Site	Result	Attendance	Source
September 29	Oregon		University of Washington Stadium; Seattle, WA (rivalry)	W 20–6	32,000	
October 6	at California		California Memorial Stadium; Berkeley, CA	L 14–27	35,000	
October 13	Washington State		University of Washington Stadium; Seattle, WA (rivalry)	W 6–0	35,000	
October 20	vs. Oregon State		Multnomah Stadium; Portland, OR	W 13–0	18,000	
October 27	No. 20 USC		University of Washington Stadium; Seattle, WA	W 13–7	40,000	
November 3	vs. Oregon	No. 18	Multnomah Stadium; Portland, OR	W 7–0	28,194	
November 10	Oregon State	No. 18	University of Washington Stadium; Seattle, WA	L 6–7	20,000	
November 17	Idaho		University of Washington Stadium; Seattle, WA	W 12–0	6,000	
November 24	at Washington State		Rogers Field; Pullman, WA	L 0–7	15,000	
Rankings from AP Poll released prior to the game; Source:

== Rankings ==
Ranking movements Legend: ██ Increase in ranking ██ Decrease in ranking — = Not ranked т = Tied with team above or below
	Week								
Poll	1	2	3	4	5	6	7	8	Final
AP	—	—	—	18т	18	—	—	—	—

== NFL draft selections ==
Six University of Washington Huskies were selected in the 1946 NFL draft, which lasted 32 rounds with 300 selections.

= Husky Hall of Fame

Player	Position	Round	Pick	NFL club
Keith DeCourcy	Back	8	7	Detroit Lions
Lee Louis	Back	13	1	Chicago Cardinals
John Wingender	Back	13	7	Philadelphia Eagles
Maurice Stacy	Back	24	6	Green Bay Packers
John Norton	Back	26	6	Green Bay Packers
Gail Bruce	End	30	3	Pittsburgh Steelers
