= 1945 Saint Mary's Pre-Flight Air Devils football team =

American college football season

1945 Saint Mary's Pre-Flight Air Devils football
- Conference: Independent
- Record: 2–4–1
- Head coach: Bernie Masterson (1st season)
- Home stadium: Kezar Stadium

1945 military service football records
	Conf.					Overall
Team	W		L		T	W		L		T
Army Air Forces League
Third Air Force +	4	–	1	–	1	7	–	2	–	1
AAF Training Command +	4	–	1	–	1	8	–	3	–	1
Fourth Air Force	3	–	2	–	1	6	–	3	–	1
First Air Force	2	–	2	–	2	3	–	2	–	3
Air Transport Command	2	–	3	–	1	6	–	3	–	2
Personnel Distribution Command	2	–	4	–	0	6	–	5	–	0
Second Air Force	1	–	5	–	0	3	–	7	–	0
Independents
Fleet City			–			11	–	0	–	1
Jacksonville NAS			–			9	–	2	–	0
Hutchinson NAS			–			8	–	0	–	0
Selman Field			–			8	–	1	–	0
El Toro Marines			–			8	–	2	–	0
Corpus Christi NAS			–			7	–	1	–	0
North Camp Hood			–			7	–	1	–	0
Little Creek			–			7	–	2	–	0
Santa Barbara Marines			–			7	–	3	–	1
Camp Lee			–			7	–	4	–	0
Camp Beale			–			6	–	1	–	2
Farragut NTS			–			6	–	2	–	0
Eastern Flying Training Command			–			6	–	3	–	1
Great Lakes Navy			–			6	–	4	–	1
Hondo AAF			–			6	–	4	–	1
South Camp Hood			–			5	–	2	–	0
Camp Peary			–			5	–	3	–	0
Bainbridge			–			5	–	4	–	0
Fort Benning			–			5	–	4	–	1
Fort Warren			–			5	–	7	–	0
Fort McClellan			–			4	–	2	–	0
San Diego NTS			–			4	–	2	–	0
Atlantic City NAS			–			4	–	2	–	1
Minter Field			–			4	–	2	–	1
Williams Field			–			4	–	4	–	0
Stockton AAF			–			4	–	5	–	2
Barksdale Field			–			4	–	7	–	0
Fort Pierce			–			4	–	9	–	0
Amarillo AAF			–			3	–	1	–	0
Olathe NAS			–			3	–	2	–	0
Albany Navy			–			3	–	3	–	1
Camp Detrick			–			3	–	4	–	0
Kearney AAF			–			3	–	4	–	0
Bergstrom Field			–			3	–	5	–	1
Keesler Field			–			3	–	6	–	1
Melville PT Boats			–			2	–	1	–	0
Great Bend AAF			–			2	–	4	–	0
Saint Mary's Pre-Flight			–			2	–	4	–	1
Gulfport AAF			–			2	–	5	–	0
Pensacola NAS			–			2	–	7	–	1
Squantum NAS			–			1	–	1	–	0
Camp Blanding			–			1	–	2	–	0
Luke Field			–			1	–	2	–	0
Miami NAS			–			1	–	2	–	0
Miami NTC			–			1	–	3	–	0
NSB New London			–			1	–	3	–	0
Oceana NAS			–			1	–	3	–	0
Fort Riley			–			1	–	4	–	0
Lake Charles AAF			–			1	–	4	–	0
Ellington Field			–			1	–	4	–	1
Cherry Point Marines			–			1	–	8	–	0
Dalhart AAF			–			0	–	3	–	0
Homestead AAB			–			0	–	3	–	0
Fort Monroe			–			0	–	7	–	0
+ – Conference co-champions

The 1945 Saint Mary's Pre-Flight Air Devils football team represented the United States Navy pre-flight school at Saint Mary's College of California during the 1944 college football season. In its fourth season, the team compiled a 2–4–1 record. The team's head coach was Bernie Masterson, who was hired as the head football coach at the University of Nebraska after the season.

The team's roster included Frankie Albert, Bob deLauer, Mike DiBiase, Len Eshmont, Dale Gentry, Parker Hall, John Kuzman, Ray Mallouf, Ray Riddick, Bob Titchenal, Hilman Walker, John Woudenberg, and Frank Yokas.

The Saint Mary's Pre-Flight Air Devils were ranked 26th among the nation's college and service teams in the final Litkenhous Ratings.

== Schedule ==
Date	Time	Opponent	Site	Result	Attendance	Source
September 28	8:00 p.m.	at Pacific (CA)	Baxter Stadium; Stockton, CA	W 69–0		
October 6	2:30 p.m.	at USC	Los Angeles Memorial Coliseum; Los Angeles, CA	L 14–26	25,000	
October 14	2:30 p.m.	Fourth Air Force	Kezar Stadium; San Francisco, CA	L 7–20	22,000	
October 19	8:30 p.m.	at UCLA	Los Angeles Memorial Coliseum; Los Angeles, CA	W 13–6	30,000	
November 4	2:00 p.m.	vs. Fleet City	Kezar Stadium; San Francisco, CA	T 13–13	58,000	
November 18		El Toro Marines	Kezar Stadium; San Francisco, CA	L 0–7	35,000	
December 1	2:00 p.m.	at California	California Memorial Stadium; Berkeley, CA	L 0–6	25,000	
All times are in Pacific time
