= 1945 Idaho Vandals football team =

American college football season

1945 Idaho Vandals football
- Conference: Pacific Coast Conference
- Record: 1–7 (1–5 PCC)
- Head coach: James A. Brown (1st season)
- Offensive scheme: Single-wing
- Home stadium: Neale Stadium

1945 Pacific Coast Conference football standings
	Conf.					Overall
Team	W		L		T	W		L		T
No. 11 USC $	5	–	1	–	0	7	–	4	–	0
Washington State	6	–	2	–	1	6	–	2	–	1
Washington	6	–	3	–	0	6	–	3	–	0
Oregon State	4	–	4	–	0	4	–	4	–	1
UCLA	2	–	3	–	0	5	–	4	–	0
California	2	–	4	–	1	4	–	5	–	1
Oregon	3	–	6	–	0	3	–	6	–	0
Idaho	1	–	5	–	0	1	–	7	–	0
Montana	0	–	1	–	0	1	–	4	–	0
$ – Conference champion; Rankings from AP Poll

The 1945 Idaho Vandals football team represented the University of Idaho in the 1945 college football season. The Vandals were led by first-year head coach James A. Brown and were members of the Pacific Coast Conference. Home games were played on campus at Neale Stadium in Moscow, with none held in Boise this season.

Idaho was 1–7 overall and won one of their six PCC games. The football program returned after missing the previous two seasons, due to World War II manpower shortages. Composed mostly of freshmen, Idaho met two nearby teams twice, Washington State and the Farragut Naval Training Station, their sole non-conference opponent. The Vandals did not venture outside of the Northwest; the longest road trip was to play Oregon in Eugene.

The losing streak in the Battle of the Palouse with neighbor Washington State reached seventeen games, falling 12–43 in the opener at Moscow, and 0–21 in Pullman four weeks later. Idaho tied the Cougars five years later, but the winless streak continued until 1954.

In the rivalry game with Montana, Idaho won 46–0 in Moscow to retain the Little Brown Stein; it was the third of six straight shutouts in the series, with each side winning three.

At Farragut on November 10, eight inches (20 cm) of snow was removed from the field just prior to the game by German prisoners of war.

Alumnus Brown ran the downsized UI athletic department during the war and coached the basketball team for four seasons (1942–46). Due to the death of Francis Schmidt in September 1944, Brown was the interim football coach in 1945; he was named head coach in March 1946, but resigned eight months later.

== Schedule ==
Date	Time	Opponent	Site	Result	Attendance	Source
September 29	2:00 pm	Washington State	Neale Stadium; Moscow, ID (Battle of the Palouse)	L 12–43	9,500	
October 6	2:00 pm	at Oregon	Hayward Field; Eugene, OR	L 7–33	6,000	
October 13		Farragut NTS*	Neale Stadium; Moscow, ID	L 7–18	3,500	
October 20		Montana^{†}	Neale Stadium; Moscow, ID (Little Brown Stein)	W 46–0		
October 27	2:00 pm	at Washington State	Rogers Field; Pullman, WA	L 0–21	5,000	
November 3	2:00 pm	at Oregon State	Bell Field; Corvallis, OR	L 0–34	5,000	
November 10		at Farragut NTS*	Farragut, ID	L 6–14		
November 17		at Washington	Husky Stadium; Seattle, WA	L 0–12	6,000	
*Non-conference game; ^{†}Homecoming; All times are in Pacific time

== Coaching staff ==
- Ben Dobbs, assistant

== All-conference ==
No Vandals were named to the All-Coast team; halfback Jim Hatch was honorable mention.
