= 1945 Fleet City Bluejackets football team =

American college football season

1945 Fleet City Bluejackets football
- Conference: Independent
- Record: 11–0–1
- Head coach: Bill Reinhart (1st season)
- Home stadium: Forster Field, Kezar Stadium

1945 military service football records
	Conf.					Overall
Team	W		L		T	W		L		T
Army Air Forces League
Third Air Force +	4	–	1	–	1	7	–	2	–	1
AAF Training Command +	4	–	1	–	1	8	–	3	–	1
Fourth Air Force	3	–	2	–	1	6	–	3	–	1
First Air Force	2	–	2	–	2	3	–	2	–	3
Air Transport Command	2	–	3	–	1	6	–	3	–	2
Personnel Distribution Command	2	–	4	–	0	6	–	5	–	0
Second Air Force	1	–	5	–	0	3	–	7	–	0
Independents
Fleet City			–			11	–	0	–	1
Jacksonville NAS			–			9	–	2	–	0
Hutchinson NAS			–			8	–	0	–	0
Selman Field			–			8	–	1	–	0
El Toro Marines			–			8	–	2	–	0
Corpus Christi NAS			–			7	–	1	–	0
North Camp Hood			–			7	–	1	–	0
Little Creek			–			7	–	2	–	0
Santa Barbara Marines			–			7	–	3	–	1
Camp Lee			–			7	–	4	–	0
Camp Beale			–			6	–	1	–	2
Farragut NTS			–			6	–	2	–	0
Eastern Flying Training Command			–			6	–	3	–	1
Great Lakes Navy			–			6	–	4	–	1
Hondo AAF			–			6	–	4	–	1
South Camp Hood			–			5	–	2	–	0
Camp Peary			–			5	–	3	–	0
Bainbridge			–			5	–	4	–	0
Fort Benning			–			5	–	4	–	1
Fort Warren			–			5	–	7	–	0
Fort McClellan			–			4	–	2	–	0
San Diego NTS			–			4	–	2	–	0
Atlantic City NAS			–			4	–	2	–	1
Minter Field			–			4	–	2	–	1
Williams Field			–			4	–	4	–	0
Stockton AAF			–			4	–	5	–	2
Barksdale Field			–			4	–	7	–	0
Fort Pierce			–			4	–	9	–	0
Amarillo AAF			–			3	–	1	–	0
Olathe NAS			–			3	–	2	–	0
Albany Navy			–			3	–	3	–	1
Camp Detrick			–			3	–	4	–	0
Kearney AAF			–			3	–	4	–	0
Bergstrom Field			–			3	–	5	–	1
Keesler Field			–			3	–	6	–	1
Melville PT Boats			–			2	–	1	–	0
Great Bend AAF			–			2	–	4	–	0
Saint Mary's Pre-Flight			–			2	–	4	–	1
Gulfport AAF			–			2	–	5	–	0
Pensacola NAS			–			2	–	7	–	1
Squantum NAS			–			1	–	1	–	0
Camp Blanding			–			1	–	2	–	0
Luke Field			–			1	–	2	–	0
Miami NAS			–			1	–	2	–	0
Miami NTC			–			1	–	3	–	0
NSB New London			–			1	–	3	–	0
Oceana NAS			–			1	–	3	–	0
Fort Riley			–			1	–	4	–	0
Lake Charles AAF			–			1	–	4	–	0
Ellington Field			–			1	–	4	–	1
Cherry Point Marines			–			1	–	8	–	0
Dalhart AAF			–			0	–	3	–	0
Homestead AAB			–			0	–	3	–	0
Fort Monroe			–			0	–	7	–	0
+ – Conference co-champions

The 1945 Fleet City Bluejackets football team represented the United States Navy distribution center at Camp Shoemaker, near Dublin, California, during the 1945 college football season. Led by first-year head coach, Lt. Cmdr. Bill Reinhart, the Flying Marines compiled an 11–0–1 record.

Reinhart's coaching staff included four Navy lieutenants: Jim Barber, who had played professionally with the Washington Redskins of the National Football League (NFL); Tex Orr, who had played at Southern Methodist University (SMU); Wally Cruice, who had played at Northwestern University; and Jack Malevich, who was head coach of the 1944 Fleet City team. The Fleet City roster included Buddy Young, Paul Christman, Harry Hopp, Cliff Lewis, Steve Juzwik, Bill Daddio, Edgar Jones, Bruiser Kinard, Charlie O'Rourke, Al Vandeweghe, Doyle Tackett, and Curt Sandig.

Fleet City was ranked fourth among the nation's college and service teams in the final Litkenhous Ratings, behind Army, Navy, and Alabama. In late November, Reinhart reported that the Los Angeles War Bond committee had contacted him about matching his Fleet City team against the undefeated Army team on December 26 at Los Angeles Coliseum.

== Schedule ==
Date	Time	Opponent	Site	Result	Attendance	Source
September 16		San Joaquin Cowboys	Forster Field; Fleet City, CA	W 77–0		
September 23	2:30 p.m.	Second Air Force	Kezar Stadium; San Francisco, CA	W 7–0	62,000	
September 29		El Toro Marines	Kezar Stadium; San Francisco, CA	W 21–7	25,000	
October 7	2:00 p.m.	Camp Beale	Forster Field; Fleet City, CA	W 88–0	10,000	
October 14	2:15 p.m.	Hollywood Rangers	Forster Field; Fleet City, CA	W 16–0	10,000	
October 28		vs. Fort Warren	DU Stadium; Denver, CO	W 21–9	14,441	
November 4	2:00 p.m.	vs. Saint Mary's Pre-Flight	Kezar Stadium; San Francisco, CA	T 13–13	58,000	
November 12	2:00 p.m.	Los Angeles Broncos	Kezar Stadium; San Francisco, CA	W 41–6	20,000	
November 25	2:00 p.m.	Fourth Air Force	Kezar Stadium; San Francisco, CA	W 20–10	50,000	
December 2		Pacific Fleet All-Stars	Kezar Stadium; San Francisco, CA	W 23–7	60,000	
December 9	2:30 p.m.	at El Toro Marines	Los Angeles Memorial Coliseum; Los Angeles, CA	W 48–25	59,143	
December 16	2:00 p.m.	Fort Warren	Kezar Stadium; San Francisco, CA	W 27–0	35,000	
All times are in Pacific time
