= 1945 Santa Barbara Marines football team =

American college football season

1945 Santa Barbara Marines football
- Conference: Independent
- Record: 7–3–1
- Head coach: Dick Evans (1st season)
- Home stadium: La Playa Stadium

1945 military service football records
	Conf.					Overall
Team	W		L		T	W		L		T
Army Air Forces League
Third Air Force +	4	–	1	–	1	7	–	2	–	1
AAF Training Command +	4	–	1	–	1	8	–	3	–	1
Fourth Air Force	3	–	2	–	1	6	–	3	–	1
First Air Force	2	–	2	–	2	3	–	2	–	3
Air Transport Command	2	–	3	–	1	6	–	3	–	2
Personnel Distribution Command	2	–	4	–	0	6	–	5	–	0
Second Air Force	1	–	5	–	0	3	–	7	–	0
Independents
Fleet City			–			11	–	0	–	1
Jacksonville NAS			–			9	–	2	–	0
Hutchinson NAS			–			8	–	0	–	0
Selman Field			–			8	–	1	–	0
El Toro Marines			–			8	–	2	–	0
Corpus Christi NAS			–			7	–	1	–	0
North Camp Hood			–			7	–	1	–	0
Little Creek			–			7	–	2	–	0
Santa Barbara Marines			–			7	–	3	–	1
Camp Lee			–			7	–	4	–	0
Camp Beale			–			6	–	1	–	2
Farragut NTS			–			6	–	2	–	0
Eastern Flying Training Command			–			6	–	3	–	1
Great Lakes Navy			–			6	–	4	–	1
Hondo AAF			–			6	–	4	–	1
South Camp Hood			–			5	–	2	–	0
Camp Peary			–			5	–	3	–	0
Bainbridge			–			5	–	4	–	0
Fort Benning			–			5	–	4	–	1
Fort Warren			–			5	–	7	–	0
Fort McClellan			–			4	–	2	–	0
San Diego NTS			–			4	–	2	–	0
Atlantic City NAS			–			4	–	2	–	1
Minter Field			–			4	–	2	–	1
Williams Field			–			4	–	4	–	0
Stockton AAF			–			4	–	5	–	2
Barksdale Field			–			4	–	7	–	0
Fort Pierce			–			4	–	9	–	0
Amarillo AAF			–			3	–	1	–	0
Olathe NAS			–			3	–	2	–	0
Albany Navy			–			3	–	3	–	1
Camp Detrick			–			3	–	4	–	0
Kearney AAF			–			3	–	4	–	0
Bergstrom Field			–			3	–	5	–	1
Keesler Field			–			3	–	6	–	1
Melville PT Boats			–			2	–	1	–	0
Great Bend AAF			–			2	–	4	–	0
Saint Mary's Pre-Flight			–			2	–	4	–	1
Gulfport AAF			–			2	–	5	–	0
Pensacola NAS			–			2	–	7	–	1
Squantum NAS			–			1	–	1	–	0
Camp Blanding			–			1	–	2	–	0
Luke Field			–			1	–	2	–	0
Miami NAS			–			1	–	2	–	0
Miami NTC			–			1	–	3	–	0
NSB New London			–			1	–	3	–	0
Oceana NAS			–			1	–	3	–	0
Fort Riley			–			1	–	4	–	0
Lake Charles AAF			–			1	–	4	–	0
Ellington Field			–			1	–	4	–	1
Cherry Point Marines			–			1	–	8	–	0
Dalhart AAF			–			0	–	3	–	0
Homestead AAB			–			0	–	3	–	0
Fort Monroe			–			0	–	7	–	0
+ – Conference co-champions

The 1945 Santa Barbara Marines football team, also known as the Goleta Marines, represented the United States Marine Corps's Air Station Santa Barbara in Goleta, California during the 1945 college football season. Led by head coach Dick Evans, the Marines compiled a record of 7–3–1. The team played home games at La Playa Stadium in Santa Barbara, California.

The Santa Barbara Marines ranked 143rd among the nation's college and service teams in the final Litkenhous Ratings.

== Schedule ==
Date	Time	Opponent	Site	Result	Attendance	Source
September 8	8:00 p.m.	Stockton AAF	La Playa Stadium; Santa Barbara, CA	W 26–0	4,000	
September 14	8:00 p.m.	at Pacific (CA)	Baxter Stadium; Stockton, CA	T 7–7		
September 22	8:00 p.m.	Minter Field	La Playa Stadium; Santa Barbara, CA	W 25–0	6,000	
September 29		San Joaquin Cowboys	La Playa Stadium; Santa Barbara, CA	W 32–0	5,000	
October 6	8:15 p.m.	Albany Navy	La Playa Stadium; Santa Barbara, CA	W 20–12	4,000	
October 14		Nevada	Mackay Field; Reno, NV	L 12–19		
October 20		Fresno State	La Playa Stadium; Santa Barbara, CA	W 6–0		
October 27	8:15 p.m.	Cal Poly	La Playa Stadium; Santa Barbara, CA	W 42–0		
November 2		Compton	Compton, CA	W 40–7		
November 10	2:00 p.m.	Hondo AAF	La Playa Stadium; Santa Barbara, CA	L 7–13		
November 18		at San Diego NTS	San Diego, CA	L 7–34		
All times are in Pacific time
