= 1945 Fort Warren Broncos football team =

American college football season

1945 Fort Warren Broncos football
- Conference: Independent
- Record: 5–7
- Head coach: Wee Willie Smith (3rd season)

1945 military service football records
	Conf.					Overall
Team	W		L		T	W		L		T
Army Air Forces League
Third Air Force +	4	–	1	–	1	7	–	2	–	1
AAF Training Command +	4	–	1	–	1	8	–	3	–	1
Fourth Air Force	3	–	2	–	1	6	–	3	–	1
First Air Force	2	–	2	–	2	3	–	2	–	3
Air Transport Command	2	–	3	–	1	6	–	3	–	2
Personnel Distribution Command	2	–	4	–	0	6	–	5	–	0
Second Air Force	1	–	5	–	0	3	–	7	–	0
Independents
Fleet City			–			11	–	0	–	1
Jacksonville NAS			–			9	–	2	–	0
Hutchinson NAS			–			8	–	0	–	0
Selman Field			–			8	–	1	–	0
El Toro Marines			–			8	–	2	–	0
Corpus Christi NAS			–			7	–	1	–	0
North Camp Hood			–			7	–	1	–	0
Little Creek			–			7	–	2	–	0
Santa Barbara Marines			–			7	–	3	–	1
Camp Lee			–			7	–	4	–	0
Camp Beale			–			6	–	1	–	2
Farragut NTS			–			6	–	2	–	0
Eastern Flying Training Command			–			6	–	3	–	1
Great Lakes Navy			–			6	–	4	–	1
Hondo AAF			–			6	–	4	–	1
South Camp Hood			–			5	–	2	–	0
Camp Peary			–			5	–	3	–	0
Bainbridge			–			5	–	4	–	0
Fort Benning			–			5	–	4	–	1
Fort Warren			–			5	–	7	–	0
Fort McClellan			–			4	–	2	–	0
San Diego NTS			–			4	–	2	–	0
Atlantic City NAS			–			4	–	2	–	1
Minter Field			–			4	–	2	–	1
Williams Field			–			4	–	4	–	0
Stockton AAF			–			4	–	5	–	2
Barksdale Field			–			4	–	7	–	0
Fort Pierce			–			4	–	9	–	0
Amarillo AAF			–			3	–	1	–	0
Olathe NAS			–			3	–	2	–	0
Albany Navy			–			3	–	3	–	1
Camp Detrick			–			3	–	4	–	0
Kearney AAF			–			3	–	4	–	0
Bergstrom Field			–			3	–	5	–	1
Keesler Field			–			3	–	6	–	1
Melville PT Boats			–			2	–	1	–	0
Great Bend AAF			–			2	–	4	–	0
Saint Mary's Pre-Flight			–			2	–	4	–	1
Gulfport AAF			–			2	–	5	–	0
Pensacola NAS			–			2	–	7	–	1
Squantum NAS			–			1	–	1	–	0
Camp Blanding			–			1	–	2	–	0
Luke Field			–			1	–	2	–	0
Miami NAS			–			1	–	2	–	0
Miami NTC			–			1	–	3	–	0
NSB New London			–			1	–	3	–	0
Oceana NAS			–			1	–	3	–	0
Fort Riley			–			1	–	4	–	0
Lake Charles AAF			–			1	–	4	–	0
Ellington Field			–			1	–	4	–	1
Cherry Point Marines			–			1	–	8	–	0
Dalhart AAF			–			0	–	3	–	0
Homestead AAB			–			0	–	3	–	0
Fort Monroe			–			0	–	7	–	0
+ – Conference co-champions

The 1945 Fort Warren Broncos football team, sometimes referred to as the Broncs, Bronchos, or Cowboys, represented the United States Army base at Fort Warren, located in Cheyenne, Wyoming, during the 1945 college football season. Led by third-year head coach Wee Willie Smith, the Broncos compiled a record of 5–7. The team's roster included Roman Bentz, Mitchell Olenski, and Mac Speedie.

The Fort Warren Broncos were ranked 56th among the nation's college and service teams in the final Litkenhous Ratings.

== Schedule ==
Date	Time	Opponent	Site	Result	Attendance	Source
September 8	9:00 p.m.	vs. Fourth Air Force	Gonzaga Stadium; Spokane, WA	L 0–25	11,000	
September 22		at Colorado	Folsom Field; Boulder CO	W 6–0	6,000	
September 30		vs. Second Air Force	DU Stadium; Denver, CO	L 0–19	6,000–7,000	
October 6		Colorado A&M	Cheyenne, WY	W 60–7		
October 13	1:00 p.m.	at No. 5 Minnesota	Memorial Stadium; Minneapolis, MN	L 0–14	32,465	
October 20	1:00 p.m.	vs. Hondo AAF	Creighton Stadium; Omaha, NE	W 28–26		
October 28		vs. Fleet City	DU Stadium; Denver, CO	L 0–21	14,441	
November 4		Farragut NTS	Cheyenne, WY	W 27–0		
November 17		at Great Lakes Navy	Ross Field; North Chicago, IL	L 14–47	18,000	
November 25		vs. El Toro Marines	DU Stadium; Denver, CO (Bond Bowl)	L 7–40	23,000	
December 7		at Hollywood Rangers	Gilmore Stadium; Los Angeles, CA	W 47–9 or 49–9	1,500	
December 16	3:00 p.m.	at Fleet City	Kezar Stadium; San Francisco, CA	L 0–27	35,000	
Rankings from AP Poll released prior to the game; All times are in Mountain time
