= 1945 Washington State Cougars football team =

American college football season

1945 Washington State Cougars football
- Conference: Pacific Coast Conference
- Record: 6–2–1 (6–2–1 PCC)
- Head coach: Phil Sarboe (1st season)
- Home stadium: Rogers Field

1945 Pacific Coast Conference football standings
	Conf.					Overall
Team	W		L		T	W		L		T
No. 11 USC $	5	–	1	–	0	7	–	4	–	0
Washington State	6	–	2	–	1	6	–	2	–	1
Washington	6	–	3	–	0	6	–	3	–	0
Oregon State	4	–	4	–	0	4	–	4	–	1
UCLA	2	–	3	–	0	5	–	4	–	0
California	2	–	4	–	1	4	–	5	–	1
Oregon	3	–	6	–	0	3	–	6	–	0
Idaho	1	–	5	–	0	1	–	7	–	0
Montana	0	–	1	–	0	1	–	4	–	0
$ – Conference champion; Rankings from AP Poll

The 1945 Washington State Cougars football team was an American football team that represented Washington State College in the Pacific Coast Conference (PCC) during the 1945 college football season. First-year head coach Phil Sarboe led the team to a 6–2–1 mark in the PCC and 6–2–1 overall. The season marked the resumption of play after the conclusion of World War II; the Cougars last fielded a team in 1942.

All of the games this season were within the conference. Montana was not on the schedule and the other four opponents from the northern division of the PCC were each played twice.

== Schedule ==
Date	Opponent	Site	Result	Attendance	Source
September 29	at Idaho	Neale Stadium; Moscow, ID (rivalry)	W 43–12	9,000	
October 6	Oregon State	Rogers Field; Pullman, WA	W 33–0	9,000	
October 13	at Washington	Husky Stadium; Seattle, WA (rivalry)	L 0–6	35,000	
October 20	at Oregon	Hayward Field; Eugene, OR	L 13–26	6,500	
October 27	Idaho	Rogers Field; Pullman, WA	W 21–0	5,000	
November 3	at California	California Memorial Stadium; Berkeley, CA	T 7–7	40,000	
November 10	Oregon	Rogers Field; Pullman, WA	W 20–13	7,000	
November 17	at Oregon State	Bell Field; Corvallis, OR	W 13–6	8,000	
November 24	Washington	Rogers Field; Pullman, WA	W 7–0	15,000	
