= 1945 Personnel Distribution Command Comets football team =

American college football season

1945 Personnel Distribution Command Comets football
- Conference: Army Air Forces League
- Record: 6–5 (2–4 AAF League)
- Head coach: Ted Shipkey (1st season; first 3 games); Wally Marks (1st season, final 8 games)
- Home stadium: DuPont Manual Stadium, Greensboro Memorial Stadium

1945 military service football records
	Conf.					Overall
Team	W		L		T	W		L		T
Army Air Forces League
Third Air Force +	4	–	1	–	1	7	–	2	–	1
AAF Training Command +	4	–	1	–	1	8	–	3	–	1
Fourth Air Force	3	–	2	–	1	6	–	3	–	1
First Air Force	2	–	2	–	2	3	–	2	–	3
Air Transport Command	2	–	3	–	1	6	–	3	–	2
Personnel Distribution Command	2	–	4	–	0	6	–	5	–	0
Second Air Force	1	–	5	–	0	3	–	7	–	0
Independents
Fleet City			–			11	–	0	–	1
Jacksonville NAS			–			9	–	2	–	0
Hutchinson NAS			–			8	–	0	–	0
Selman Field			–			8	–	1	–	0
El Toro Marines			–			8	–	2	–	0
Corpus Christi NAS			–			7	–	1	–	0
North Camp Hood			–			7	–	1	–	0
Little Creek			–			7	–	2	–	0
Santa Barbara Marines			–			7	–	3	–	1
Camp Lee			–			7	–	4	–	0
Camp Beale			–			6	–	1	–	2
Farragut NTS			–			6	–	2	–	0
Eastern Flying Training Command			–			6	–	3	–	1
Great Lakes Navy			–			6	–	4	–	1
Hondo AAF			–			6	–	4	–	1
South Camp Hood			–			5	–	2	–	0
Camp Peary			–			5	–	3	–	0
Bainbridge			–			5	–	4	–	0
Fort Benning			–			5	–	4	–	1
Fort Warren			–			5	–	7	–	0
Fort McClellan			–			4	–	2	–	0
San Diego NTS			–			4	–	2	–	0
Atlantic City NAS			–			4	–	2	–	1
Minter Field			–			4	–	2	–	1
Williams Field			–			4	–	4	–	0
Stockton AAF			–			4	–	5	–	2
Barksdale Field			–			4	–	7	–	0
Fort Pierce			–			4	–	9	–	0
Amarillo AAF			–			3	–	1	–	0
Olathe NAS			–			3	–	2	–	0
Albany Navy			–			3	–	3	–	1
Camp Detrick			–			3	–	4	–	0
Kearney AAF			–			3	–	4	–	0
Bergstrom Field			–			3	–	5	–	1
Keesler Field			–			3	–	6	–	1
Melville PT Boats			–			2	–	1	–	0
Great Bend AAF			–			2	–	4	–	0
Saint Mary's Pre-Flight			–			2	–	4	–	1
Gulfport AAF			–			2	–	5	–	0
Pensacola NAS			–			2	–	7	–	1
Squantum NAS			–			1	–	1	–	0
Camp Blanding			–			1	–	2	–	0
Luke Field			–			1	–	2	–	0
Miami NAS			–			1	–	2	–	0
Miami NTC			–			1	–	3	–	0
NSB New London			–			1	–	3	–	0
Oceana NAS			–			1	–	3	–	0
Fort Riley			–			1	–	4	–	0
Lake Charles AAF			–			1	–	4	–	0
Ellington Field			–			1	–	4	–	1
Cherry Point Marines			–			1	–	8	–	0
Dalhart AAF			–			0	–	3	–	0
Homestead AAB			–			0	–	3	–	0
Fort Monroe			–			0	–	7	–	0
+ – Conference co-champions

The 1945 Personnel Distribution Command Comets football team represented the Personnel Distribution Command (PDC) based in Greensboro, North Carolina and Louisville, Kentucky during the 1945 college football season. The Comets competed in the Army Air Forces League (AAF League) with six others teams from the United States Army Air Forces. The team compiled an overall record of 6–5 with a mark of 2–4 in league play, placing sixth in the AAF League.

The Comets began the season with Captain Ted Shipkey as head coach. In October, after the team's first three games, Shipkey was discharged from military service and returned to the University of New Mexico, where he had been head football coach before World War II. He was succeeded by Major Wally Marks who had coached at Indiana State University before the war. Staff Sergeant Jim Harris was the team's line coach until he was discharged along with Shipkey.

The PDC Comets were ranked 27th among the nation's college and service teams in the final Litkenhous Ratings.

== Schedule ==
Date	Time	Opponent	Site	Result	Attendance	Source
September 23	2:30 p.m.	at Third Air Force	Phillips Field; Tampa, FL	L 9–27	12,000	
September 29		at Army*	Michie Stadium; West Point, NY	L 0–32	9,000	
October 7	2:30 p.m.	Air Transport Command	DuPont Manual Stadium; Louisville, KY	L 8–15	6,000	
October 14		First Air Force	Greensboro Memorial Stadium; Greensboro, NC	W 7–0	12,000	
October 21		vs. Second Air Force	University Stadium; Albuquerque, NM	L 0–13	8,000	
October 28		Bergstrom Field*	DuPont Manual Stadium; Louisville, KY	W 26–0	4,500	
November 4		Fort Pierce*	Greensboro Memorial Stadium; Greensboro, NC	W 16–7	10,000	
November 11		at Fourth Air Force	Los Angeles Memorial Coliseum; Los Angeles, CA	W 9–7	15,000	
November 19		at Miami NAS*	Burdine Stadium; Miami, FL	W 45–6	5,982	
December 2		at Camp Peary*	Cary Field; Williamsburg, VA	W 21–14	10,000	
December 9		vs. AAF Training Command	Alamo Stadium; San Antonio, TX	L 0–14	6,546	
*Non-conference game; All times are in Eastern time
