= 1945 Jacksonville Naval Air Station Fliers football team =

American college football season

1945 Jacksonville Naval Air Station Fliers football
- Conference: Independent
- Record: 9–2
- Head coach: Jim Tatum (1st season)
- Offensive scheme: T formation
- Captain: Walt Dubzinski
- Home stadium: Municipal Stadium

1945 military service football records
	Conf.					Overall
Team	W		L		T	W		L		T
Army Air Forces League
Third Air Force +	4	–	1	–	1	7	–	2	–	1
AAF Training Command +	4	–	1	–	1	8	–	3	–	1
Fourth Air Force	3	–	2	–	1	6	–	3	–	1
First Air Force	2	–	2	–	2	3	–	2	–	3
Air Transport Command	2	–	3	–	1	6	–	3	–	2
Personnel Distribution Command	2	–	4	–	0	6	–	5	–	0
Second Air Force	1	–	5	–	0	3	–	7	–	0
Independents
Fleet City			–			11	–	0	–	1
Jacksonville NAS			–			9	–	2	–	0
Hutchinson NAS			–			8	–	0	–	0
Selman Field			–			8	–	1	–	0
El Toro Marines			–			8	–	2	–	0
Corpus Christi NAS			–			7	–	1	–	0
North Camp Hood			–			7	–	1	–	0
Little Creek			–			7	–	2	–	0
Santa Barbara Marines			–			7	–	3	–	1
Camp Lee			–			7	–	4	–	0
Camp Beale			–			6	–	1	–	2
Farragut NTS			–			6	–	2	–	0
Eastern Flying Training Command			–			6	–	3	–	1
Great Lakes Navy			–			6	–	4	–	1
Hondo AAF			–			6	–	4	–	1
South Camp Hood			–			5	–	2	–	0
Camp Peary			–			5	–	3	–	0
Bainbridge			–			5	–	4	–	0
Fort Benning			–			5	–	4	–	1
Fort Warren			–			5	–	7	–	0
Fort McClellan			–			4	–	2	–	0
San Diego NTS			–			4	–	2	–	0
Atlantic City NAS			–			4	–	2	–	1
Minter Field			–			4	–	2	–	1
Williams Field			–			4	–	4	–	0
Stockton AAF			–			4	–	5	–	2
Barksdale Field			–			4	–	7	–	0
Fort Pierce			–			4	–	9	–	0
Amarillo AAF			–			3	–	1	–	0
Olathe NAS			–			3	–	2	–	0
Albany Navy			–			3	–	3	–	1
Camp Detrick			–			3	–	4	–	0
Kearney AAF			–			3	–	4	–	0
Bergstrom Field			–			3	–	5	–	1
Keesler Field			–			3	–	6	–	1
Melville PT Boats			–			2	–	1	–	0
Great Bend AAF			–			2	–	4	–	0
Saint Mary's Pre-Flight			–			2	–	4	–	1
Gulfport AAF			–			2	–	5	–	0
Pensacola NAS			–			2	–	7	–	1
Squantum NAS			–			1	–	1	–	0
Camp Blanding			–			1	–	2	–	0
Luke Field			–			1	–	2	–	0
Miami NAS			–			1	–	2	–	0
Miami NTC			–			1	–	3	–	0
NSB New London			–			1	–	3	–	0
Oceana NAS			–			1	–	3	–	0
Fort Riley			–			1	–	4	–	0
Lake Charles AAF			–			1	–	4	–	0
Ellington Field			–			1	–	4	–	1
Cherry Point Marines			–			1	–	8	–	0
Dalhart AAF			–			0	–	3	–	0
Homestead AAB			–			0	–	3	–	0
Fort Monroe			–			0	–	7	–	0
+ – Conference co-champions

The 1945 Jacksonville Naval Air Station Fliers football team represented the Jacksonville Naval Air Station (Jacksonville NAS) during the 1945 college football season. Led by head coach Jim Tatum, the Fliers compiled a record of 9–2. Walt Dubzinski was the team captain. Other members of the roster included Otis Douglas, Warren Giese, and Barney McGarry. The Fliers ran the T formation on offense.

The Jacksonville NAS Fliers were ranked ninth among the nation's college and service teams in the final Litkenhous Ratings.

== Schedule ==
Date	Time	Opponent	Site	Result	Attendance	Source
September 22		Miami NTC	Jacksonville, FL	W 35–6	14,000	
September 30		Cherry Point Marines	Municipal Stadium; Jacksonville, FL	W 26–0		
October 6		Corpus Christi NAS	Municipal Stadium; Jacksonville, FL	W 35–7		
October 13		at Fort Pierce	Fort Pierce, FL	W 13–6	5,000–6,000	
October 20		at Miami NTC	Burdine Stadium; Miami, FL	W 61–0	5,879	
October 27	2:30 p.m.	Fort Pierce	Jacksonville, FL	W 35–7	16,000	
November 4		at Fort Benning	Doughboy Stadium; Fort Benning, GA	W 33–7	12,000	
November 10		Corpus Christi NAS	Buccaneer Stadium; Corpus Christi, TX	L 13–14		
November 17		at Pensacola NAS	Air Station Field; Pensacola, FL	W 48–0	8,000	
November 24		Fort Benning	Municipal Stadium; Jacksonville, FL	L 7–14	14,000	
December 1		Pensacola NAS	Municipal Stadium; Jacksonville, FL	W 48–0	5,000	
All times are in Eastern time
