= 1945 Oregon State Beavers football team =

American college football season

1945 Oregon State Beavers football
- Head Coach Lon Stiner
- Conference: Pacific Coast Conference
- Record: 4–4–1 (4–4 PCC)
- Head coach: Lon Stiner (11th season)
- Home stadium: Bell Field

1945 Pacific Coast Conference football standings
| | Conf. | | | | | Overall |
| Team | W | | L | | T | W | | L | | T |
|---|---|---|---|---|---|---|---|---|---|---|
| No. 11 USC $ | 5 | – | 1 | – | 0 | 7 | – | 4 | – | 0 |
| Washington State | 6 | – | 2 | – | 1 | 6 | – | 2 | – | 1 |
| Washington | 6 | – | 3 | – | 0 | 6 | – | 3 | – | 0 |
| Oregon State | 4 | – | 4 | – | 0 | 4 | – | 4 | – | 1 |
| UCLA | 2 | – | 3 | – | 0 | 5 | – | 4 | – | 0 |
| California | 2 | – | 4 | – | 1 | 4 | – | 5 | – | 1 |
| Oregon | 3 | – | 6 | – | 0 | 3 | – | 6 | – | 0 |
| Idaho | 1 | – | 5 | – | 0 | 1 | – | 7 | – | 0 |
| Montana | 0 | – | 1 | – | 0 | 1 | – | 4 | – | 0 |
$ – Conference champion; Rankings from AP Poll

The 1945 Oregon State Beavers football team represented Oregon State College in the Pacific Coast Conference (PCC) during the 1945 college football season. Led by eleventh-year head coach Lon Stiner, the Beavers compiled a 4–4–1 record (4–4 in PCC, fourth), and were outscored 131 to 100. OSC played its five home games on campus at Bell Field in Corvallis.

The season marked the resumption of play after the conclusion of World War II; the Beavers last fielded a team in 1942.

== Schedule ==
| Date | Time | Opponent | Site | Result | Attendance | Source |
|---|---|---|---|---|---|---|
| September 29 | 2:00 p.m. | Camp Beale | Bell Field; Corvallis, OR | T 14–14 | 7,000 | |
| October 6 | | at Washington State | Rogers Field; Pullman, WA | L 0–33 | 9,000 | |
| October 13 | | Oregon | Bell Field; Corvallis, OR (rivalry) | W 19–6 | 18,000–20,000 | |
| October 20 | | Washington | Multnomah Stadium; Portland, OR | L 0–13 | 22,600 | |
| November 3 | 2:00 p.m. | Idaho | Bell Field; Corvallis, OR | W 34–0 | 4,500 | |
| November 10 | | at No. 18 Washington | Husky Stadium; Seattle, WA | W 7–6 | 20,000–28,000 | |
| November 17 | | Washington State | Bell Field; Corvallis, OR | L 6–13 | 8,000 | |
| November 24 | | at USC | Los Angeles Memorial Coliseum; Los Angeles, CA | L 7–34 | 30,500 | |
| December 1 | | at Oregon | Hayward Field; Eugene, OR | W 13–12 | 11,000 | |
Rankings from Coaches' Poll released prior to the game; All times are in Pacific time
