= 1945 Montana Grizzlies football team =

American college football season

1945 Montana Grizzlies football
- Conference: Pacific Coast Conference
- Record: 1–4 (0–1 PCC)
- Head coach: George Dahlberg (1st season)
- Home stadium: Dornblaser Field

1945 Pacific Coast Conference football standings
	Conf.					Overall
Team	W		L		T	W		L		T
No. 11 USC $	5	–	1	–	0	7	–	4	–	0
Washington State	6	–	2	–	1	6	–	2	–	1
Washington	6	–	3	–	0	6	–	3	–	0
Oregon State	4	–	4	–	0	4	–	4	–	1
UCLA	2	–	3	–	0	5	–	4	–	0
California	2	–	4	–	1	4	–	5	–	1
Oregon	3	–	6	–	0	3	–	6	–	0
Idaho	1	–	5	–	0	1	–	7	–	0
Montana	0	–	1	–	0	1	–	4	–	0
$ – Conference champion; Rankings from AP Poll

The 1945 Montana Grizzlies football team represented the University of Montana in the 1945 college football season as a member of the Pacific Coast Conference (PCC). The Grizzlies were led by first-year head coach George Dahlberg, played their home games at Dornblaser Field and finished the season with a record of one win and four losses (1–4, 0–1 PCC).

== Schedule ==
Date	Time	Opponent	Site	Result	Attendance	Source
October 13		at Utah State*	Romney Stadium; Logan, UT	L 13–44	2,500	
October 20		at Idaho	Neale Stadium; Moscow, ID (Little Brown Stein)	L 0–46		
October 29		at Farragut NTS*	Farragut, ID	L 13–21	5,500	
November 10	2:00 p.m.	Pocatello Marine Base*	Dornblaser Field; Missoula, MT	W 36–6		
November 22		Farragut NTS*	Dornblaser Field; Missoula, MT	L 13–18	4,000	
*Non-conference game; All times are in Mountain time
