= George Dahlberg =

American sports coach and college athletics administrator

Biographical details
- Born: April 21, 1900; Butte, Montana, U.S.
- Died: September 18, 1993 (aged 93); Fort William Henry Harrison, Montana, U.S.

Playing career

Football
- 1921–1923: Montana

Basketball
- 1922–1925: Montana

Coaching career (HC unless noted)

Football
- 1937–1941: Montana (assistant)
- 1945: Montana
- 1946–1948: Montana (assistant)

Basketball
- 1937–1942: Montana
- 1944–1955: Montana

Administrative career (AD unless noted)
- 1954–1961: Montana

Head coaching record
- Overall: 1–4 (football); 221–223 (basketball)

George Peter "Jiggs" Dahlberg (April 21, 1900 – September 18, 1993) was an American football and basketball coach and college athletics administrator. He served as the head basketball coach at the University of Montana from 1937 to 1942 and again from 1944 to 1955, compiling a record of 221–223. Dahlberg was also the head football coach at Montana for one season, in 1945, tallying a mark of 1–4. He was the athletic director at Montana from 1954 to 1961.

== Personal life ==
Dahlberg was born on April 21, 1900, in Butte, Montana. He died on September 18, 1993, at the Veterans Administration Hospital in Fort William Henry Harrison, Montana.

Dahlberg graduated from the University of Montana in 1925, lettering in basketball and football.

== Coaching career ==
Dahlberg began a career as a coach at the high school level, starting out at Miles City High School in Miles City, Montana in 1925 as head coach for basketball and football. His four years at the school brought several district titles in both sports, winning basketball and football state championships in 1928. He went to Hoquiam, Washington in 1929 continuing his dual coaching roles, spending two years and winning a district title in basketball. After a year in Anaconda, Montana, with another basketball district championship achieved with a team of sophomores, he then spent four years as the head football coach at Puyallup High School. Dahlberg's coaching led to Puyallup winning a league championship in 1935. Before moving on to begin his college coaching career, he spent the 1936-1937 school year leading the basketball and football program at Chehalis High School where he was also named as the athletic director.

Dahlberg became assistant football coach and head of the basketball program at the University of Montana in February 1937.

== Head coaching record ==
=== Football ===
Year	Team	Overall	Conference	Standing	Bowl/playoffs
Montana Grizzlies (Pacific Coast Conference) (1945)
1945	Montana	1–4	0–1	9th	
Montana:		1–4	0–1		
Total:		1–4			

=== Basketball ===
Year	Team	Overall	Conference	Standing	Bowl/playoffs
Montana Grizzlies (Pacific Coast Conference) (1937–1938)
1937–38	Montana	9–18	3–17	6th (North)	
Montana Grizzlies (Independent) (1938–1942)
1938–39	Montana	17–13			
1939–40	Montana	17–8			AAU National Tournament Third Round
1940–41	Montana	13–15			
1941–42	Montana	14–10			
Montana Grizzlies (Independent) (1944–1951)
1944–45	Montana	7–22			
1945–46	Montana	14–16			
1946–47	Montana	12–16			
1947–48	Montana	21–11			
1948–49	Montana	12–13			
1949–50	Montana	27–4			
1950–51	Montana	12–19			
Montana Grizzlies (Skyline Conference) (1951–1955)
1951–52	Montana	12–14	7–7	5th	
1952–53	Montana	14–11	6–8	4th	
1953–54	Montana	8–19	3–11	T–7th	
1954–55	Montana	12–14	4–10	T–6th	
Montana:		221–223			
Total:		221–223			
