= 1945 Camp Beale Bears football team =

American college football season

1945 Camp Beale Bears football
- Conference: Independent
- Record: 6–1–2
- Head coach: George Hurley (1st season)
- Home stadium: Knight Field

1945 military service football records
	Conf.					Overall
Team	W		L		T	W		L		T
Army Air Forces League
Third Air Force +	4	–	1	–	1	7	–	2	–	1
AAF Training Command +	4	–	1	–	1	8	–	3	–	1
Fourth Air Force	3	–	2	–	1	6	–	3	–	1
First Air Force	2	–	2	–	2	3	–	2	–	3
Air Transport Command	2	–	3	–	1	6	–	3	–	2
Personnel Distribution Command	2	–	4	–	0	6	–	5	–	0
Second Air Force	1	–	5	–	0	3	–	7	–	0
Independents
Fleet City			–			11	–	0	–	1
Jacksonville NAS			–			9	–	2	–	0
Hutchinson NAS			–			8	–	0	–	0
Selman Field			–			8	–	1	–	0
El Toro Marines			–			8	–	2	–	0
Corpus Christi NAS			–			7	–	1	–	0
North Camp Hood			–			7	–	1	–	0
Little Creek			–			7	–	2	–	0
Santa Barbara Marines			–			7	–	3	–	1
Camp Lee			–			7	–	4	–	0
Camp Beale			–			6	–	1	–	2
Farragut NTS			–			6	–	2	–	0
Eastern Flying Training Command			–			6	–	3	–	1
Great Lakes Navy			–			6	–	4	–	1
Hondo AAF			–			6	–	4	–	1
South Camp Hood			–			5	–	2	–	0
Camp Peary			–			5	–	3	–	0
Bainbridge			–			5	–	4	–	0
Fort Benning			–			5	–	4	–	1
Fort Warren			–			5	–	7	–	0
Fort McClellan			–			4	–	2	–	0
San Diego NTS			–			4	–	2	–	0
Atlantic City NAS			–			4	–	2	–	1
Minter Field			–			4	–	2	–	1
Williams Field			–			4	–	4	–	0
Stockton AAF			–			4	–	5	–	2
Barksdale Field			–			4	–	7	–	0
Fort Pierce			–			4	–	9	–	0
Amarillo AAF			–			3	–	1	–	0
Olathe NAS			–			3	–	2	–	0
Albany Navy			–			3	–	3	–	1
Camp Detrick			–			3	–	4	–	0
Kearney AAF			–			3	–	4	–	0
Bergstrom Field			–			3	–	5	–	1
Keesler Field			–			3	–	6	–	1
Melville PT Boats			–			2	–	1	–	0
Great Bend AAF			–			2	–	4	–	0
Saint Mary's Pre-Flight			–			2	–	4	–	1
Gulfport AAF			–			2	–	5	–	0
Pensacola NAS			–			2	–	7	–	1
Squantum NAS			–			1	–	1	–	0
Camp Blanding			–			1	–	2	–	0
Luke Field			–			1	–	2	–	0
Miami NAS			–			1	–	2	–	0
Miami NTC			–			1	–	3	–	0
NSB New London			–			1	–	3	–	0
Oceana NAS			–			1	–	3	–	0
Fort Riley			–			1	–	4	–	0
Lake Charles AAF			–			1	–	4	–	0
Ellington Field			–			1	–	4	–	1
Cherry Point Marines			–			1	–	8	–	0
Dalhart AAF			–			0	–	3	–	0
Homestead AAB			–			0	–	3	–	0
Fort Monroe			–			0	–	7	–	0
+ – Conference co-champions

The 1945 Camp Beale Bears football team represented the United States Army's Camp Beale near Marysville, California during the 1945 college football season. Led by head coach George Hurley, the Bears compiled a record of 6–1–2. Chris Brady, Al Klotz, and Sebastian Passanisi were assistant coaches for the team. Tony Falkenstein and Alex Smail played for the Bears.

Camp Beale ranked 153rd among the nation's college and service teams in the final Litkenhous Ratings.

== Schedule ==
Date	Time	Opponent	Site	Result	Attendance	Source
September 7	8:00 p.m.	at Pacific (CA)	Baxter Stadium; Stockton, CA	W 13–7	4,000	
September 22	8:00 p.m.	Stockton AAF	Knight Field; Marysville, CA	T 0–0	5,000	
September 29	2:00 p.m.	Oregon State	Bell Field; Corvallis, OR	T 14–14	7,000	
October 7	2:00 p.m.	at Fleet City	Forster Field; Fleet City, CA	L 0–88	10,000	
October 13	1:00 p.m.	at Williams Field	Goodwin Stadium; Tempe, AZ	W 21–0		
October 20	8:00 p.m.	Pittsburg town team	Knight Field; Marysville, CA	W 34–0		
October 28	2:15 p.m.	San Joaquin Cowboys	Knight Field; Marysville, CA	W 53–0		
November 3	8:00 p.m.	Albany Navy	Knight Field; Marysville, CA	W 24–7		
November 10		at Las Vegas AAF	Las Vegas, NV	cancelled		
November 17	2:00 p.m.	Fresno State	Knight Field; Marysville, CA	W 21–13		
All times are in Pacific time
