= 1945 Fort Benning Doughboys football team =

American college football season

1945 Fort Benning Doughboys football
- Conference: Independent
- Record: 5–4–1
- Head coach: Archie Milano (1st season; first 2 games); Bill Meek (1st season, final 8 games)
- Home stadium: Doughboys Stadium

1945 military service football records
	Conf.					Overall
Team	W		L		T	W		L		T
Army Air Forces League
Third Air Force +	4	–	1	–	1	7	–	2	–	1
AAF Training Command +	4	–	1	–	1	8	–	3	–	1
Fourth Air Force	3	–	2	–	1	6	–	3	–	1
First Air Force	2	–	2	–	2	3	–	2	–	3
Air Transport Command	2	–	3	–	1	6	–	3	–	2
Personnel Distribution Command	2	–	4	–	0	6	–	5	–	0
Second Air Force	1	–	5	–	0	3	–	7	–	0
Independents
Fleet City			–			11	–	0	–	1
Jacksonville NAS			–			9	–	2	–	0
Hutchinson NAS			–			8	–	0	–	0
Selman Field			–			8	–	1	–	0
El Toro Marines			–			8	–	2	–	0
Corpus Christi NAS			–			7	–	1	–	0
North Camp Hood			–			7	–	1	–	0
Little Creek			–			7	–	2	–	0
Santa Barbara Marines			–			7	–	3	–	1
Camp Lee			–			7	–	4	–	0
Camp Beale			–			6	–	1	–	2
Farragut NTS			–			6	–	2	–	0
Eastern Flying Training Command			–			6	–	3	–	1
Great Lakes Navy			–			6	–	4	–	1
Hondo AAF			–			6	–	4	–	1
South Camp Hood			–			5	–	2	–	0
Camp Peary			–			5	–	3	–	0
Bainbridge			–			5	–	4	–	0
Fort Benning			–			5	–	4	–	1
Fort Warren			–			5	–	7	–	0
Fort McClellan			–			4	–	2	–	0
San Diego NTS			–			4	–	2	–	0
Atlantic City NAS			–			4	–	2	–	1
Minter Field			–			4	–	2	–	1
Williams Field			–			4	–	4	–	0
Stockton AAF			–			4	–	5	–	2
Barksdale Field			–			4	–	7	–	0
Fort Pierce			–			4	–	9	–	0
Amarillo AAF			–			3	–	1	–	0
Olathe NAS			–			3	–	2	–	0
Albany Navy			–			3	–	3	–	1
Camp Detrick			–			3	–	4	–	0
Kearney AAF			–			3	–	4	–	0
Bergstrom Field			–			3	–	5	–	1
Keesler Field			–			3	–	6	–	1
Melville PT Boats			–			2	–	1	–	0
Great Bend AAF			–			2	–	4	–	0
Saint Mary's Pre-Flight			–			2	–	4	–	1
Gulfport AAF			–			2	–	5	–	0
Pensacola NAS			–			2	–	7	–	1
Squantum NAS			–			1	–	1	–	0
Camp Blanding			–			1	–	2	–	0
Luke Field			–			1	–	2	–	0
Miami NAS			–			1	–	2	–	0
Miami NTC			–			1	–	3	–	0
NSB New London			–			1	–	3	–	0
Oceana NAS			–			1	–	3	–	0
Fort Riley			–			1	–	4	–	0
Lake Charles AAF			–			1	–	4	–	0
Ellington Field			–			1	–	4	–	1
Cherry Point Marines			–			1	–	8	–	0
Dalhart AAF			–			0	–	3	–	0
Homestead AAB			–			0	–	3	–	0
Fort Monroe			–			0	–	7	–	0
+ – Conference co-champions

The 1945 Fort Benning Doughboys football team represented the United States Army post at Fort Benning near Columbus, Georgia during the 1945 college football season. The Doughboys compiled a record of 5–4–1. Fort Benning began with season with Archie Milano as head coach. Milano was discharged from the Army in October, after the team's first two games, and succeeded by Bill Meek. The team's roster included Gene Corum, Monk Edwards, Hank Goodman, George Hecht, and Clyde Johnson.

The Fort Benning Doughboys were ranked 28th among the nation's college and service teams in the final Litkenhous Ratings.

== Schedule ==
Date	Time	Opponent	Site	Result	Attendance	Source
September 30	2:30 p.m.	at AAF Training Command	Farrington Field; Fort Worth, TX	L 0–27	10,000	
October 6		at Great Lakes Navy	Ross Field; North Chicago, IL	W 21–12	20,000	
October 14		at Keesler Field	Flier Field; Biloxi, MS	W 26–7		
October 21		Keesler Field	Doughboy Stadium; Fort Benning, GA	T 0–0	16,000	
October 27		at Fort McClellan	Anniston Municipal Stadium; Anniston, AL	W 21–6	7,000	
November 4		Jacksonville NAS	Doughboy Stadium; Fort Benning, GA	L 7–33	12,000	
November 11		at Fort Pierce	Jaycee Field; Fort Pierce, FL	L 13–14		
November 18		Air Transport Command	Doughboy Stadium; Fort Benning, GA	L 7–23	12,000	
November 24		at Jacksonville NAS	Municipal Stadium; Jacksonville, FL	W 14–17	14,000	
December 2		Fort Pierce	Doughboy Stadium; Fort Benning, GA	W 40–6		
December 9		Fort McClellan	Doughboy Stadium; Fort Benning, GA	cancelled		
All times are in Eastern time
