= 1945 UCLA Bruins football team =

American college football season

1945 UCLA Bruins football
- Conference: Pacific Coast Conference
- Record: 5–4 (2–3 PCC)
- Head coach: Bert LaBrucherie (1st season)
- Home stadium: Los Angeles Memorial Coliseum

1945 Pacific Coast Conference football standings
	Conf.					Overall
Team	W		L		T	W		L		T
No. 11 USC $	5	–	1	–	0	7	–	4	–	0
Washington State	6	–	2	–	1	6	–	2	–	1
Washington	6	–	3	–	0	6	–	3	–	0
Oregon State	4	–	4	–	0	4	–	4	–	1
UCLA	2	–	3	–	0	5	–	4	–	0
California	2	–	4	–	1	4	–	5	–	1
Oregon	3	–	6	–	0	3	–	6	–	0
Idaho	1	–	5	–	0	1	–	7	–	0
Montana	0	–	1	–	0	1	–	4	–	0
$ – Conference champion; Rankings from AP Poll

The 1945 UCLA Bruins football team was an American football team that represented the University of California, Los Angeles in the Pacific Coast Conference (PCC) during the 1945 college football season. In their first year under head coach Bert LaBrucherie, the Bruins compiled a 5–4 record (2–3 in PCC, fifth); eight of their nine games were played at the Los Angeles Memorial Coliseum.

== Schedule ==
Date	Time	Opponent	Rank	Site	Result	Attendance	Source
September 21		USC		Los Angeles Memorial Coliseum; Los Angeles, CA (Victory Bell)	L 6–13	90,000	
September 29	2:30 p.m.	San Diego NTS*		Los Angeles Memorial Coliseum; Los Angeles, CA	W 20–14	20,000	
October 5		Pacific (CA)*		Los Angeles Memorial Coliseum; Los Angeles, CA	W 50–0	10,000	
October 13		California		Los Angeles Memorial Coliseum; Los Angeles, CA (rivalry)	W 13–0	40,000	
October 19	8:30 p.m.	Saint Mary's Pre-Flight*		Los Angeles Memorial Coliseum; Los Angeles, CA	L 6–13	30,000	
October 26	8:30 p.m.	Oregon		Los Angeles Memorial Coliseum; Los Angeles, CA	W 12–0	40,000	
November 17		No. 5 Saint Mary's*		Los Angeles Memorial Coliseum; Los Angeles, CA	W 13–7	87,000	
November 24		at California	No. 12	California Memorial Stadium; Berkeley, CA	L 0–6	25,000	
December 1		at No. 16 USC		Los Angeles Memorial Coliseum; Los Angeles, CA	L 15–26	103,000	
*Non-conference game; Rankings from AP Poll released prior to the game; All times are in Pacific time

In addition to the above listed games, UCLA met the El Toro Marines in a scrimmage held on November 1 in Los Angeles, won by the Marines, 27–19.

== Rankings ==
Ranking movements Legend: ██ Increase in ranking ██ Decrease in ranking — = Not ranked ( ) = First-place votes
	Week								
Poll	1	2	3	4	5	6	7	8	Final
AP	—	—	—	—	—	—	12 (1)	—	—
