= 1945 El Toro Flying Marines football team =

American college football season

1945 El Toro Flying Marines football
- Conference: Independent
- Record: 8–2
- Head coach: Dick Hanley (2nd season)
- Captain: George Franck
- Home stadium: Santa Ana Municipal Bowl, Los Angeles Memorial Coliseum

1945 military service football records
	Conf.					Overall
Team	W		L		T	W		L		T
Army Air Forces League
Third Air Force +	4	–	1	–	1	7	–	2	–	1
AAF Training Command +	4	–	1	–	1	8	–	3	–	1
Fourth Air Force	3	–	2	–	1	6	–	3	–	1
First Air Force	2	–	2	–	2	3	–	2	–	3
Air Transport Command	2	–	3	–	1	6	–	3	–	2
Personnel Distribution Command	2	–	4	–	0	6	–	5	–	0
Second Air Force	1	–	5	–	0	3	–	7	–	0
Independents
Fleet City			–			11	–	0	–	1
Jacksonville NAS			–			9	–	2	–	0
Hutchinson NAS			–			8	–	0	–	0
Selman Field			–			8	–	1	–	0
El Toro Marines			–			8	–	2	–	0
Corpus Christi NAS			–			7	–	1	–	0
North Camp Hood			–			7	–	1	–	0
Little Creek			–			7	–	2	–	0
Santa Barbara Marines			–			7	–	3	–	1
Camp Lee			–			7	–	4	–	0
Camp Beale			–			6	–	1	–	2
Farragut NTS			–			6	–	2	–	0
Eastern Flying Training Command			–			6	–	3	–	1
Great Lakes Navy			–			6	–	4	–	1
Hondo AAF			–			6	–	4	–	1
South Camp Hood			–			5	–	2	–	0
Camp Peary			–			5	–	3	–	0
Bainbridge			–			5	–	4	–	0
Fort Benning			–			5	–	4	–	1
Fort Warren			–			5	–	7	–	0
Fort McClellan			–			4	–	2	–	0
San Diego NTS			–			4	–	2	–	0
Atlantic City NAS			–			4	–	2	–	1
Minter Field			–			4	–	2	–	1
Williams Field			–			4	–	4	–	0
Stockton AAF			–			4	–	5	–	2
Barksdale Field			–			4	–	7	–	0
Fort Pierce			–			4	–	9	–	0
Amarillo AAF			–			3	–	1	–	0
Olathe NAS			–			3	–	2	–	0
Albany Navy			–			3	–	3	–	1
Camp Detrick			–			3	–	4	–	0
Kearney AAF			–			3	–	4	–	0
Bergstrom Field			–			3	–	5	–	1
Keesler Field			–			3	–	6	–	1
Melville PT Boats			–			2	–	1	–	0
Great Bend AAF			–			2	–	4	–	0
Saint Mary's Pre-Flight			–			2	–	4	–	1
Gulfport AAF			–			2	–	5	–	0
Pensacola NAS			–			2	–	7	–	1
Squantum NAS			–			1	–	1	–	0
Camp Blanding			–			1	–	2	–	0
Luke Field			–			1	–	2	–	0
Miami NAS			–			1	–	2	–	0
Miami NTC			–			1	–	3	–	0
NSB New London			–			1	–	3	–	0
Oceana NAS			–			1	–	3	–	0
Fort Riley			–			1	–	4	–	0
Lake Charles AAF			–			1	–	4	–	0
Ellington Field			–			1	–	4	–	1
Cherry Point Marines			–			1	–	8	–	0
Dalhart AAF			–			0	–	3	–	0
Homestead AAB			–			0	–	3	–	0
Fort Monroe			–			0	–	7	–	0
+ – Conference co-champions

The 1945 El Toro Flying Marines football team represented the El Toro Marine Corps Air Station during the 1945 college football season. The station was located in Orange County, California, near the town of El Toro (later renamed Lake Forest). Led by second-year head coach, Dick Hanley, the Flying Marines compiled an 8–2 record. El Toro was ranked fifth among the nation's college and service teams in the final Litkenhous Ratings, behind Army, Navy, Alabama, and Fleet City.

George Franck was the team captain. Fullback Frank Balazs and halfbacks Mortimer Landsberg and Hugh Gallarneau were members of the team early in the season before they were discharged from military service. Other players on the team included Elroy Hirsch, Paul Governali, Willie Wilkin, Whitey Lee of Carnegie Tech, Bob Dove, Harley McCollum, Ernie Lewis, and Dick Handley.

== Schedule ==
Date	Time	Opponent	Site	Result	Attendance	Source
September 9		Hollywood Rangers	Santa Ana Municipal Bowl; Santa Ana, CA	W 13–12	12,000	
September 22		Los Angeles Bulldogs	Santa Ana Municipal Bowl; Santa Ana, CA	W 68–0		
September 29		at Fleet City	Kezar Stadium; San Francisco, CA	L 7–21	25,000	
October 6		Camp Pendleton	Santa Ana Municipal Bowl; Santa Ana, CA	W 61–0	25,000	
October 14		at Second Air Force	Penrose Stadium; Colorado Springs, CO	W 20–9	10,000	
October 28		AAF Training Command	Los Angeles Memorial Coliseum; Los Angeles, CA	W 7–0	30,000	
November 1		at UCLA	Los Angeles, CA	W 27–19 (scrimmage)		
November 11		at San Diego NTS	San Diego, CA	W 20–0	5,000	
November 18		at Saint Mary's Pre-Flight	Kezar Stadium; San Francisco, CA	W 7–0	35,000	
November 25		vs. Fort Warren	DU Stadium; Denver, CO (Bond Bowl)	W 40–7	23,000	
December 9	2:30 p.m.	Fleet City	Los Angeles Memorial Coliseum; Los Angeles, CA	L 25–48	59,143	
All times are in Pacific time
