= 1945 First Air Force Aces football team =

American college football season

1945 First Air Force Aces football
- Conference: Army Air Forces League
- Record: 3–2–3 (2–2–2 AAF League)
- Head coach: Jesse Yarborough
- Home stadium: Ebbets Field, Freeport Municipal Stadium

1945 military service football records
	Conf.					Overall
Team	W		L		T	W		L		T
Army Air Forces League
Third Air Force +	4	–	1	–	1	7	–	2	–	1
AAF Training Command +	4	–	1	–	1	8	–	3	–	1
Fourth Air Force	3	–	2	–	1	6	–	3	–	1
First Air Force	2	–	2	–	2	3	–	2	–	3
Air Transport Command	2	–	3	–	1	6	–	3	–	2
Personnel Distribution Command	2	–	4	–	0	6	–	5	–	0
Second Air Force	1	–	5	–	0	3	–	7	–	0
Independents
Fleet City			–			11	–	0	–	1
Jacksonville NAS			–			9	–	2	–	0
Hutchinson NAS			–			8	–	0	–	0
Selman Field			–			8	–	1	–	0
El Toro Marines			–			8	–	2	–	0
Corpus Christi NAS			–			7	–	1	–	0
North Camp Hood			–			7	–	1	–	0
Little Creek			–			7	–	2	–	0
Santa Barbara Marines			–			7	–	3	–	1
Camp Lee			–			7	–	4	–	0
Camp Beale			–			6	–	1	–	2
Farragut NTS			–			6	–	2	–	0
Eastern Flying Training Command			–			6	–	3	–	1
Great Lakes Navy			–			6	–	4	–	1
Hondo AAF			–			6	–	4	–	1
South Camp Hood			–			5	–	2	–	0
Camp Peary			–			5	–	3	–	0
Bainbridge			–			5	–	4	–	0
Fort Benning			–			5	–	4	–	1
Fort Warren			–			5	–	7	–	0
Fort McClellan			–			4	–	2	–	0
San Diego NTS			–			4	–	2	–	0
Atlantic City NAS			–			4	–	2	–	1
Minter Field			–			4	–	2	–	1
Williams Field			–			4	–	4	–	0
Stockton AAF			–			4	–	5	–	2
Barksdale Field			–			4	–	7	–	0
Fort Pierce			–			4	–	9	–	0
Amarillo AAF			–			3	–	1	–	0
Olathe NAS			–			3	–	2	–	0
Albany Navy			–			3	–	3	–	1
Camp Detrick			–			3	–	4	–	0
Kearney AAF			–			3	–	4	–	0
Bergstrom Field			–			3	–	5	–	1
Keesler Field			–			3	–	6	–	1
Melville PT Boats			–			2	–	1	–	0
Great Bend AAF			–			2	–	4	–	0
Saint Mary's Pre-Flight			–			2	–	4	–	1
Gulfport AAF			–			2	–	5	–	0
Pensacola NAS			–			2	–	7	–	1
Squantum NAS			–			1	–	1	–	0
Camp Blanding			–			1	–	2	–	0
Luke Field			–			1	–	2	–	0
Miami NAS			–			1	–	2	–	0
Miami NTC			–			1	–	3	–	0
NSB New London			–			1	–	3	–	0
Oceana NAS			–			1	–	3	–	0
Fort Riley			–			1	–	4	–	0
Lake Charles AAF			–			1	–	4	–	0
Ellington Field			–			1	–	4	–	1
Cherry Point Marines			–			1	–	8	–	0
Dalhart AAF			–			0	–	3	–	0
Homestead AAB			–			0	–	3	–	0
Fort Monroe			–			0	–	7	–	0
+ – Conference co-champions

The 1945 First Air Force Aces football team represented the First Air Force based at Mitchel Field during the 1945 college football season. The Aces competed in the Army Air Forces League (AAF League) with six others teams from the United States Army Air Forces. Led by head coach Jesse Yarborough, the Aces compiled an overall record of 3–2–3 with a mark of 2–2–2 in league play, placing fourth in the AAF League. Major Yarborough's coaching staff consisted of Lieutenant Clyde Crabtree as backfield coach, Staff Sergeant George Platukis as line coach, and Lieutenant Art White as ends coach. White and Platukis were also players for the team. The team's roster included Frank Damiani and Bill Paschal, who had both played for the New York Giants of the National Football League (NFL). It also included Lieutenant John Adams, a fine end at University of Minnesota; Staff Sergeant Albert Sabol, an All Big Ten tackle at Indiana University; Private First Class Steve Sucic, a crashing fullback at Illinois University; and Private First Class Bobby Paffrath, a quarterback from University of Minnesota.

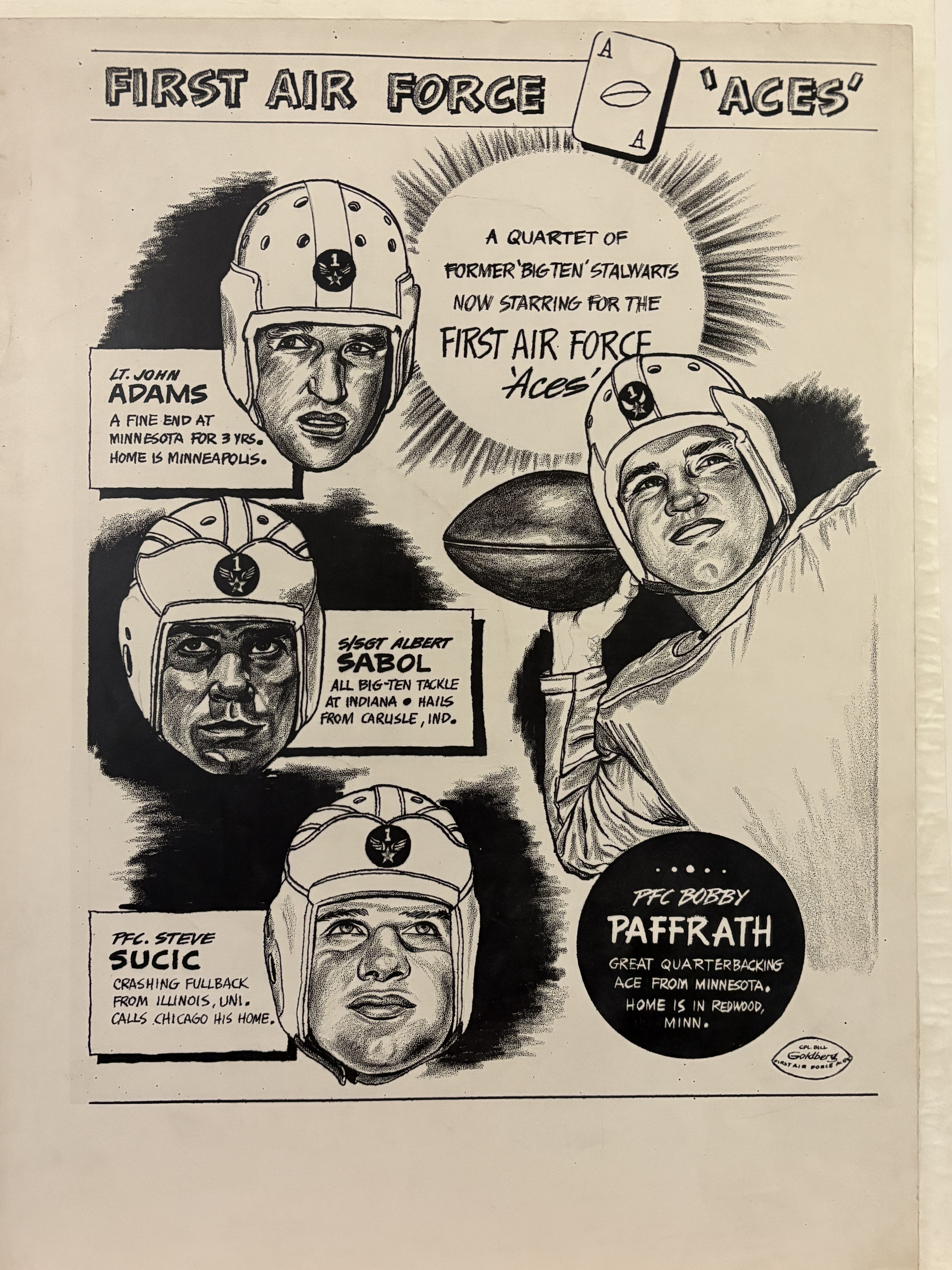
Promotional poster showing members of the First Air Force Aces football team who hailed from Big Ten conference schools (1940s)

The First Air Force Aces were ranked 14th among the nation's college and service teams in the final Litkenhous Ratings.

== Schedule ==
Date	Time	Opponent	Site	Result	Attendance	Source
September 22		at Air Transport Command*	Dudley Field; Nashville, TN	T 7–7		
September 29		at Fort Pierce*	Burdine Stadium; Miami, FL	W 19–7	16,000	
October 7	2:30 p.m.	vs. Third Air Force	Carolina Stadium; Columbia, SC	L 0–19		
October 14		at Personnel Distribution Command	Greensboro Memorial Stadium; Greensboro, NC	L 0–7	12,000	
October 21		vs. Air Transport Command	Mackenzie Field; Holyoke, MA	T 7–7	10,000	
October 28	2:00 p.m.	vs. Fourth Air Force	Baltimore Stadium; Baltimore, MD	T 6–6	7,000	
November 11	2:00 p.m.	AAF Training Command	Ebbets Field; Brooklyn, NY (Brooklyn Bond Bowl)	W 24–6	12,515	
November 18		Second Air Force	Freeport Municipal Stadium; Freeport, NY	W 15–0	4,000	
November 25		at Cherry Point Marines*	Cherry Point, NC	cancelled		
*Non-conference game; All times are in Eastern time
