= Phil Sarboe =

American football player and coach (1911–1985)

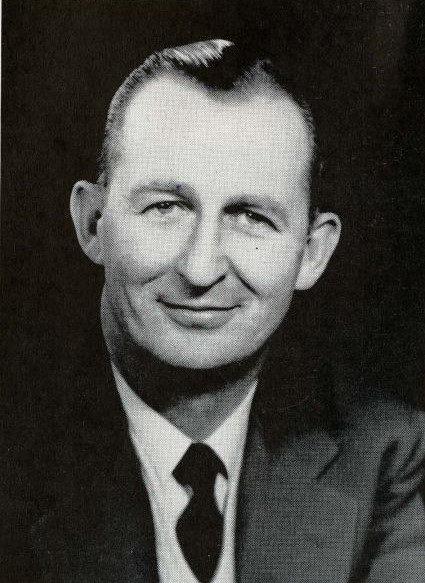
- Sarboe in 1952

Biographical details
- Born: August 22, 1911; Fairbanks, District of Alaska, U.S.
- Died: November 19, 1985 (aged 74); Spokane, Washington, U.S.

Playing career

Football
- 1931–1933: Washington State
- 1934: Boston Redskins (NFL)
- 1934–1936: Chicago Cardinals (NFL)
- 1936: Brooklyn Dodgers (NFL)
- Positions: Defensive back, quarterback, fullback

Coaching career (HC unless noted)

Football
- 1937–1938: Clarkston HS (WA)
- 1939–1940: Aberdeen HS (WA)
- 1941–1942: Central Washington
- 1943–1944: Lincoln HS (Tacoma, WA)
- 1945–1949: Washington State
- 1950: No. Central HS (Spokane, WA)
- 1951–1965: Humboldt State
- 1966: Hawaii

Basketball
- 1951–1952: Humboldt State

Baseball
- 1951-1953: Humboldt State

Administrative career (AD unless noted)
- 1966–1967: Hawaii

Head coaching record
- Overall: 131–75–11 (college football); 4–13 (college basketball)
- Tournaments: Football; 1–1 (NAIA playoffs)

Accomplishments and honors

Championships
- Football; 1 WINCO (1942); 5 FWC (1952, 1956, 1960, 1961, 1963)

Awards
- NAIA Coach of the Year (1960); Second-team All-Pro (1935); Second-team All-PCC (1933)

Philip John Sarboe (August 22, 1911 – November 19, 1985) was an American football player and coach. He played college football at the State College of Washington—now known as Washington State University—and professionally in National Football League (NFL) with the Boston Redskins, Chicago Cardinals, and Brooklyn Dodgers. Sarboe served as the head football coach at Central Washington College of Education (now known as Central Washington University) from 1941 to 1942, Washington State from 1945 to 1949, Humboldt State College (now known as California State Polytechnic University, Humboldt) from 1951 to 1965, and the University of Hawaii at Manoa in 1966, compiling a career college football head coaching record of 131–75–11 (.629).

== Early years and college playing career ==
Sarboe as a member of the NFL's Chicago Cardinals in 1936.

Born in Fairbanks, Alaska, Sarboe graduated from Lincoln High School in Tacoma, Washington, and was a three-sport athlete in the Pacific Coast Conference at the State College of Washington in Pullman — now Washington State University.

On a basketball scholarship from head coach Jack Friel, he also played shortstop in baseball under head coach Buck Bailey, and had his greatest success in football, most notably as a fullback under head coach Babe Hollingbery. Sarboe played in the East–West Shrine Game in January 1934. Although he had minor league offers in baseball, he chose to play professional football.

== Professional playing career ==
Sarboe played three seasons in the National Football League, starting with Boston Redskins in 1934. Listed at 5 ft 10 in (1.78 m) and 167 pounds (76 kg), he was traded that season to the Chicago Cardinals, and finished his pro career in 1936 with the Brooklyn Dodgers.

He completed 42.3 percent of his passes for a total of 1,133 yards, with a 4–26 career touchdown to interception ratio, working out to a career passer rating of 27.9.

== Coaching career ==
Sarboe began his coaching career in 1937 in southeastern Washington at Clarkston High School, then moved west to Aberdeen in 1939. In 1941 and 1942, he coached football at Central Washington College of Education—now Central Washington University—in Ellensburg, compiling a 6–6–3 record. The 1942 team was 4–1–1 in the Washington Intercollegiate Conference and won the conference title.

The program was suspended after the 1942 season due to World War II, and Sarboe coached in Tacoma at Lincoln High School, his alma mater. He had planned to return to Ellensburg to coach the high school team in 1945 and then return to Central Washington when it resumed football in 1946.

Hollingbery, the Cougars' head coach since 1926, was not brought back in 1945 and Sarboe was hired as head coach of the Cougars in late May, the first alumnus to head the football program. In his first season in Pullman, WSC posted a 6–2–1 record, but struggled afterward; Sarboe had a 17–26–3 (.402) record in five seasons and resigned in December 1949.

Sarboe coached a season at North Central High School in Spokane in 1950, then went to Humboldt State College in Arcata, California, where he compiled a record of 104–37–5 (.729) in fifteen seasons. In 1966, he left to coach for a season at Hawaii and posted a 4–6 record. Sarboe then returned to northwest California and became a coach and athletic director at the College of the Redwoods, a junior college in Eureka, and retired in 1977.

== Death ==
Sarboe died of cancer at age 74 in 1985 in Spokane.

== Head coaching record ==
=== College football ===
Year	Team	Overall	Conference	Standing	Bowl/playoffs
Central Washington Wildcats (Washington Intercollegiate Conference) (1941–1942)
1941	Central Washington	1–5–1	0–3–1	5th	
1942	Central Washington	5–1–2	4–1–1	1st	
Central Washington:		6–6–3	4–4–2		
Washington State Cougars (Pacific Coast Conference) (1945–1949)
1945	Washington State	6–2–1	6–2–1	2nd	
1946	Washington State	1–6–1	1–5–1	8th	
1947	Washington State	3–7	2–5	T–7th	
1948	Washington State	4–5–1	4–3–1	4th	
1949	Washington State	3–6	2–6	8th	
Washington State:		17–26–3	15–21–3		
Humboldt State Lumberjacks (Far Western Conference) (1951–1965)
1951	Humboldt State	4–3–1	2–1	3rd	
1952	Humboldt State	7–1	3–0	1st	
1953	Humboldt State	6–2	2–1	2nd	
1954	Humboldt State	5–5	3–2	3rd	
1955	Humboldt State	7–3–1	2–2–1	4th	
1956	Humboldt State	9–2	4–1	T–1st	
1957	Humboldt State	4–6	3–2	3rd	
1958	Humboldt State	7–2–1	3–2	T–2nd	
1959	Humboldt State	9–1	4–1	2nd	
1960	Humboldt State	11–1	5–0	1st	L NAIA Championship
1961	Humboldt State	8–2	4–1	T–1st	
1962	Humboldt State	7–2	3–2	2nd	
1963	Humboldt State	6–1–2	3–1–1	T–1st	
1964	Humboldt State	8–2	4–1	2nd	
1965	Humboldt State	6–4	2–3	4th	
Humboldt State:		104–37–5	40–20–2		
Hawaii Rainbows (NCAA College Division independent) (1966)
1966	Hawaii	4–6			
Hawaii:		4–6			
Total:		131–75–11			
National championship Conference title Conference division title or championship game berth
