= 1945 Great Lakes Navy Bluejackets football team =

American college football season

1945 Great Lakes Navy Bluejackets football
- Conference: Independent
- Record: 6–4–1
- Head coach: Paul Brown (2nd season)
- Home stadium: Ross Field

1945 military service football records
	Conf.					Overall
Team	W		L		T	W		L		T
Army Air Forces League
Third Air Force +	4	–	1	–	1	7	–	2	–	1
AAF Training Command +	4	–	1	–	1	8	–	3	–	1
Fourth Air Force	3	–	2	–	1	6	–	3	–	1
First Air Force	2	–	2	–	2	3	–	2	–	3
Air Transport Command	2	–	3	–	1	6	–	3	–	2
Personnel Distribution Command	2	–	4	–	0	6	–	5	–	0
Second Air Force	1	–	5	–	0	3	–	7	–	0
Independents
Fleet City			–			11	–	0	–	1
Jacksonville NAS			–			9	–	2	–	0
Hutchinson NAS			–			8	–	0	–	0
Selman Field			–			8	–	1	–	0
El Toro Marines			–			8	–	2	–	0
Corpus Christi NAS			–			7	–	1	–	0
North Camp Hood			–			7	–	1	–	0
Little Creek			–			7	–	2	–	0
Santa Barbara Marines			–			7	–	3	–	1
Camp Lee			–			7	–	4	–	0
Camp Beale			–			6	–	1	–	2
Farragut NTS			–			6	–	2	–	0
Eastern Flying Training Command			–			6	–	3	–	1
Great Lakes Navy			–			6	–	4	–	1
Hondo AAF			–			6	–	4	–	1
South Camp Hood			–			5	–	2	–	0
Camp Peary			–			5	–	3	–	0
Bainbridge			–			5	–	4	–	0
Fort Benning			–			5	–	4	–	1
Fort Warren			–			5	–	7	–	0
Fort McClellan			–			4	–	2	–	0
San Diego NTS			–			4	–	2	–	0
Atlantic City NAS			–			4	–	2	–	1
Minter Field			–			4	–	2	–	1
Williams Field			–			4	–	4	–	0
Stockton AAF			–			4	–	5	–	2
Barksdale Field			–			4	–	7	–	0
Fort Pierce			–			4	–	9	–	0
Amarillo AAF			–			3	–	1	–	0
Olathe NAS			–			3	–	2	–	0
Albany Navy			–			3	–	3	–	1
Camp Detrick			–			3	–	4	–	0
Kearney AAF			–			3	–	4	–	0
Bergstrom Field			–			3	–	5	–	1
Keesler Field			–			3	–	6	–	1
Melville PT Boats			–			2	–	1	–	0
Great Bend AAF			–			2	–	4	–	0
Saint Mary's Pre-Flight			–			2	–	4	–	1
Gulfport AAF			–			2	–	5	–	0
Pensacola NAS			–			2	–	7	–	1
Squantum NAS			–			1	–	1	–	0
Camp Blanding			–			1	–	2	–	0
Luke Field			–			1	–	2	–	0
Miami NAS			–			1	–	2	–	0
Miami NTC			–			1	–	3	–	0
NSB New London			–			1	–	3	–	0
Oceana NAS			–			1	–	3	–	0
Fort Riley			–			1	–	4	–	0
Lake Charles AAF			–			1	–	4	–	0
Ellington Field			–			1	–	4	–	1
Cherry Point Marines			–			1	–	8	–	0
Dalhart AAF			–			0	–	3	–	0
Homestead AAB			–			0	–	3	–	0
Fort Monroe			–			0	–	7	–	0
+ – Conference co-champions

The 1945 Great Lakes Navy Bluejackets football team represented the Great Lakes Navy Training Station (Great Lakes NTS) during the 1945 college football season The team compiled a 6–4–1 record, and outscored their opponents 221 to 164. Coached by the legendary Paul Brown, the Bluejackets started the season with a 0–4–1, suffering from a loss of talent as many players were shifted to the west coast to help close the pacific theater of World War II, but once the war ended many men from overseas returned to the boot camp, and the team won their final six games, culminating in a 39–7 defeat of top 5 Notre Dame at home.

The Great Lakes Navy Bluejackets were ranked 20th among the nation's college and service teams in the final Litkenhous Ratings.

== Schedule ==
Date	Opponent	Site	Result	Attendance	Source
September 8	College All–Stars	Ross Field; North Chicago, IL	L 0–35		
September 15	Michigan	Michigan Stadium; Ann Arbor, MI	L 2–27	26,076	
September 22	Wisconsin	Ross Field; North Chicago, IL	T 0–0		
September 29	Purdue	Ross Field; North Chicago, IL	L 6–20	22,000	
October 6	Fort Benning	Ross Field; North Chicago, IL	L 12–21	20,000	
October 20	Marquette	Marquette Stadium; Milwaukee, WI	W 37–27		
October 27	Western Michigan	Waldo Stadium; Kalamazoo, MI	W 39–0	10,000	
November 3	Illinois	Memorial Stadium; Champaign, IL	W 12–6	14,569	
November 10	Michigan State	Macklin Field; East Lansing, MI	W 27–7		
November 17	Fort Warren	Ross Field; North Chicago, IL	W 47–14	18,000	
December 1	No. 5 Notre Dame	Ross Field; North Chicago, IL	W 39–7	23,000	
Rankings from AP Poll released prior to the game
