= 1945 Barksdale Field Sky Raiders football team =

American college football season

1945 Barksdale Field Sky Raiders football
- Conference: Independent
- Record: 4–7
- Head coach: Raymond A. Curfman (1st season)
- Home stadium: Louisiana State Fair Grounds

1945 military service football records
| | Conf. | | | | | Overall |
| Team | W | | L | | T | W | | L | | T |
|---|---|---|---|---|---|---|---|---|---|---|
Army Air Forces League
| Third Air Force + | 4 | – | 1 | – | 1 | 7 | – | 2 | – | 1 |
| AAF Training Command + | 4 | – | 1 | – | 1 | 8 | – | 3 | – | 1 |
| Fourth Air Force | 3 | – | 2 | – | 1 | 6 | – | 3 | – | 1 |
| First Air Force | 2 | – | 2 | – | 2 | 3 | – | 2 | – | 3 |
| Air Transport Command | 2 | – | 3 | – | 1 | 6 | – | 3 | – | 2 |
| Personnel Distribution Command | 2 | – | 4 | – | 0 | 6 | – | 5 | – | 0 |
| Second Air Force | 1 | – | 5 | – | 0 | 3 | – | 7 | – | 0 |
Independents
| Fleet City | | | – | | | 11 | – | 0 | – | 1 |
| Jacksonville NAS | | | – | | | 9 | – | 2 | – | 0 |
| Hutchinson NAS | | | – | | | 8 | – | 0 | – | 0 |
| Selman Field | | | – | | | 8 | – | 1 | – | 0 |
| El Toro Marines | | | – | | | 8 | – | 2 | – | 0 |
| Corpus Christi NAS | | | – | | | 7 | – | 1 | – | 0 |
| North Camp Hood | | | – | | | 7 | – | 1 | – | 0 |
| Little Creek | | | – | | | 7 | – | 2 | – | 0 |
| Santa Barbara Marines | | | – | | | 7 | – | 3 | – | 1 |
| Camp Lee | | | – | | | 7 | – | 4 | – | 0 |
| Camp Beale | | | – | | | 6 | – | 1 | – | 2 |
| Farragut NTS | | | – | | | 6 | – | 2 | – | 0 |
| Eastern Flying Training Command | | | – | | | 6 | – | 3 | – | 1 |
| Great Lakes Navy | | | – | | | 6 | – | 4 | – | 1 |
| Hondo AAF | | | – | | | 6 | – | 4 | – | 1 |
| South Camp Hood | | | – | | | 5 | – | 2 | – | 0 |
| Camp Peary | | | – | | | 5 | – | 3 | – | 0 |
| Bainbridge | | | – | | | 5 | – | 4 | – | 0 |
| Fort Benning | | | – | | | 5 | – | 4 | – | 1 |
| Fort Warren | | | – | | | 5 | – | 7 | – | 0 |
| Fort McClellan | | | – | | | 4 | – | 2 | – | 0 |
| San Diego NTS | | | – | | | 4 | – | 2 | – | 0 |
| Atlantic City NAS | | | – | | | 4 | – | 2 | – | 1 |
| Minter Field | | | – | | | 4 | – | 2 | – | 1 |
| Williams Field | | | – | | | 4 | – | 4 | – | 0 |
| Stockton AAF | | | – | | | 4 | – | 5 | – | 2 |
| Barksdale Field | | | – | | | 4 | – | 7 | – | 0 |
| Fort Pierce | | | – | | | 4 | – | 9 | – | 0 |
| Amarillo AAF | | | – | | | 3 | – | 1 | – | 0 |
| Olathe NAS | | | – | | | 3 | – | 2 | – | 0 |
| Albany Navy | | | – | | | 3 | – | 3 | – | 1 |
| Camp Detrick | | | – | | | 3 | – | 4 | – | 0 |
| Kearney AAF | | | – | | | 3 | – | 4 | – | 0 |
| Bergstrom Field | | | – | | | 3 | – | 5 | – | 1 |
| Keesler Field | | | – | | | 3 | – | 6 | – | 1 |
| Melville PT Boats | | | – | | | 2 | – | 1 | – | 0 |
| Great Bend AAF | | | – | | | 2 | – | 4 | – | 0 |
| Saint Mary's Pre-Flight | | | – | | | 2 | – | 4 | – | 1 |
| Gulfport AAF | | | – | | | 2 | – | 5 | – | 0 |
| Pensacola NAS | | | – | | | 2 | – | 7 | – | 1 |
| Squantum NAS | | | – | | | 1 | – | 1 | – | 0 |
| Camp Blanding | | | – | | | 1 | – | 2 | – | 0 |
| Luke Field | | | – | | | 1 | – | 2 | – | 0 |
| Miami NAS | | | – | | | 1 | – | 2 | – | 0 |
| Miami NTC | | | – | | | 1 | – | 3 | – | 0 |
| NSB New London | | | – | | | 1 | – | 3 | – | 0 |
| Oceana NAS | | | – | | | 1 | – | 3 | – | 0 |
| Fort Riley | | | – | | | 1 | – | 4 | – | 0 |
| Lake Charles AAF | | | – | | | 1 | – | 4 | – | 0 |
| Ellington Field | | | – | | | 1 | – | 4 | – | 1 |
| Cherry Point Marines | | | – | | | 1 | – | 8 | – | 0 |
| Dalhart AAF | | | – | | | 0 | – | 3 | – | 0 |
| Homestead AAB | | | – | | | 0 | – | 3 | – | 0 |
| Fort Monroe | | | – | | | 0 | – | 7 | – | 0 |
+ – Conference co-champions

The 1945 Barksdale Field Sky Raiders football team represented the United States Army Air Force's Barksdale Field in Bossier Parish, Louisiana during the 1945 college football season. Led by head coach Raymond A. Curfman, the Sky Raiders compiled a record of 4–7. Curfman was assisted by line coach Charles Collins.

Barksdale Field was ranked 123rd among the nation's college and service teams in the final Litkenhous Ratings.

== Schedule ==
| Date | Time | Opponent | Site | Result | Attendance | Source |
|---|---|---|---|---|---|---|
| September 15 | 8:00 p.m. | Eastern Flying Training Command | Louisiana State Fair Grounds; Shreveport, LA | L 0–13 | 10,000 | |
| September 22 | | Arksansas | Louisiana State Fair Grounds; Shreveport, LA | L 6–12 | 7,000 | |
| September 28 | | at Army JV | West Point, NY | L 8–13 | | |
| October 6 | 8:00 p.m. | Northwestern State | Louisiana State Fair Grounds; Shreveport, LA | W 19–6 | 6,000 | |
| October 13 | | at Lake Charles AAF | Killen Field; Lake Charles, LA | W 13–9 | 3,000 | |
| October 20 | 2:00 p.m. | Selman Field | Louisiana State Fair Grounds; Shreveport, LA | L 0–13 | 4,500 | |
| October 27 | 2:00 p.m. | Camp Swift | Louisiana State Fair Grounds; Shreveport, LA | W 46–0 | | |
| November 3 | | at Louisiana Tech | Tech Stadium; Ruston, LA | W 12–7 | | |
| November 11 | | at Eastern Flying Training Command | Cramton Bowl; Montgomery, AL | L 0–29 | 5,000 | |
| November 17 | | at Selman Field | Brown Stadium; Monroe, LA | L 7–10 | 3,000 | |
| November 24 | | at Corpus Christi NAS | Buccaneer Stadium; Corpus Christi, TX | L 6–21 | 8,000 | |
All times are in Central time
