= 1945 USC Trojans football team =

American college football season

1945 USC Trojans football
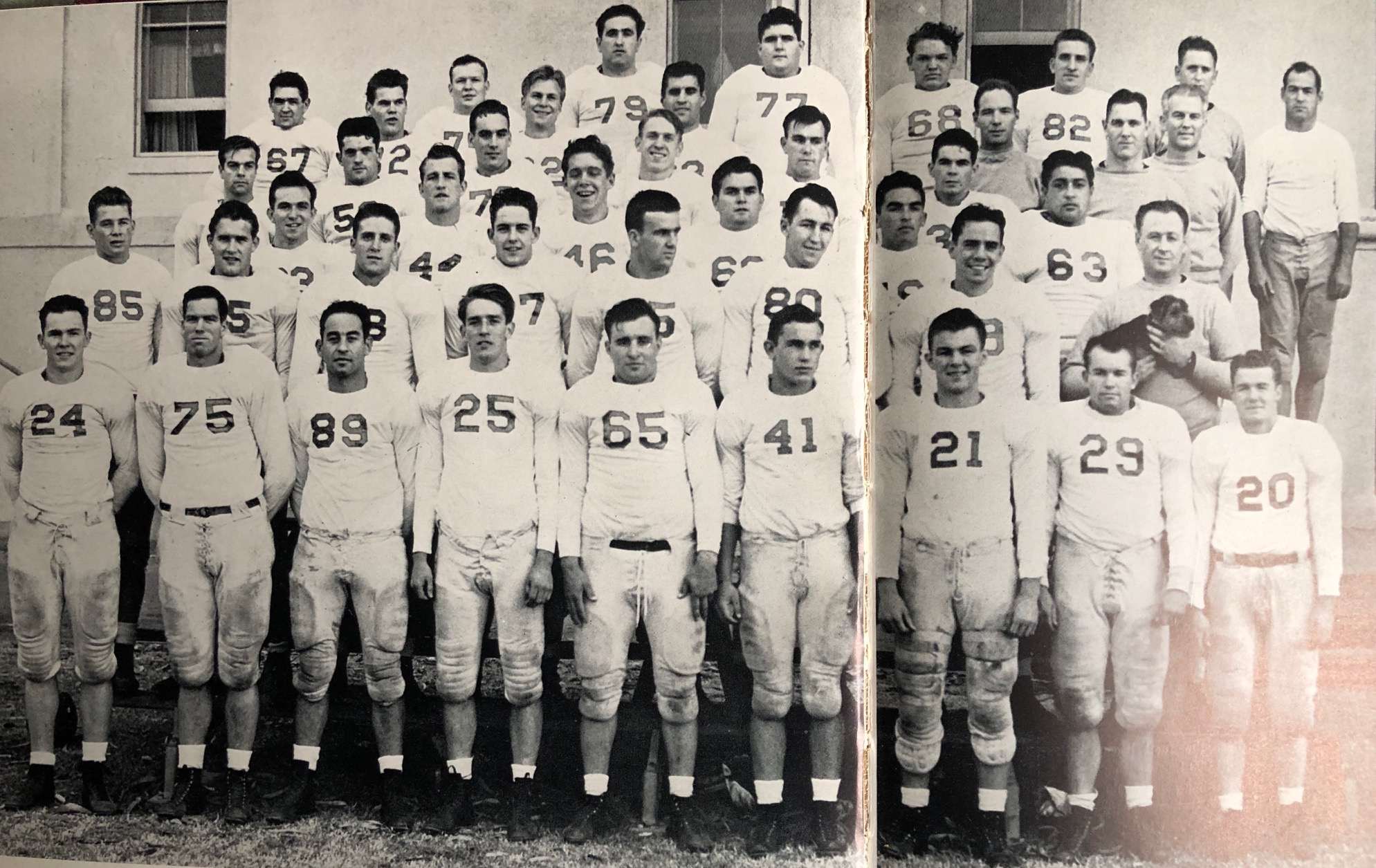

PCC champion

Rose Bowl, L 14–34 vs. Alabama
- Conference: Pacific Coast Conference

Ranking
- AP: No. 11
- Record: 7–4 (5–1 PCC)
- Head coach: Jeff Cravath (4th season)
- Home stadium: Los Angeles Memorial Coliseum

1945 Pacific Coast Conference football standings
	Conf.					Overall
Team	W		L		T	W		L		T
No. 11 USC $	5	–	1	–	0	7	–	4	–	0
Washington State	6	–	2	–	1	6	–	2	–	1
Washington	6	–	3	–	0	6	–	3	–	0
Oregon State	4	–	4	–	0	4	–	4	–	1
UCLA	2	–	3	–	0	5	–	4	–	0
California	2	–	4	–	1	4	–	5	–	1
Oregon	3	–	6	–	0	3	–	6	–	0
Idaho	1	–	5	–	0	1	–	7	–	0
Montana	0	–	1	–	0	1	–	4	–	0
$ – Conference champion; Rankings from AP Poll

The 1945 USC Trojans football team represented the University of Southern California (USC) in the 1945 college football season. In their fourth year under head coach Jeff Cravath, the Trojans compiled a 7–4 record (5–1 against conference opponents), won the Pacific Coast Conference championship, lost to Alabama in the 1946 Rose Bowl, and outscored their opponents by a combined total of 205 to 150.

== Schedule ==
Date	Time	Opponent	Rank	Site	Result	Attendance	Source
September 21		at UCLA		Los Angeles Memorial Coliseum; Los Angeles, CA (Victory Bell)	W 13–6	90,000	
September 29		at California		California Memorial Stadium; Berkeley, CA	W 13–2	50,000	
October 6	2:30 p.m.	Saint Mary's Pre-Flight*		Los Angeles Memorial Coliseum; Los Angeles, CA	W 26–14	25,000	
October 13		at San Diego NTS*	No. 6	Hull Field; San Diego, CA	L 6–33	6,000	
October 20		Pacific (CA)*	No. 14	Los Angeles Memorial Coliseum; Los Angeles, CA	W 52–0	10,000	
October 27		at Washington	No. 20	Husky Stadium; Seattle, WA	L 7–13	40,000	
November 3		No. 8 Saint Mary's*		Los Angeles Memorial Coliseum; Los Angeles, CA	L 0–26	76,378	
November 10		California		Los Angeles Memorial Coliseum; Los Angeles, CA	W 14–0	35,000	
November 24		Oregon State		Los Angeles Memorial Coliseum; Los Angeles, CA	W 34–7	35,000	
December 1		UCLA^{†}	No. 16	Los Angeles Memorial Coliseum; Los Angeles, CA	W 26–15	103,000	
January 1, 1946		vs. No. 3 Alabama*	No. 11	Rose Bowl; Pasadena, CA (Rose Bowl)	L 14–34	91,000	
*Non-conference game; ^{†}Homecoming; Rankings from AP Poll released prior to the game; All times are in Pacific time; Source:

== Rankings ==
Ranking movements Legend: ██ Increase in ranking ██ Decrease in ranking — = Not ranked ( ) = First-place votes
	Week								
Poll	1	2	3	4	5	6	7	8	Final
AP	6 (1)	14	20	—	—	—	—	16	11
