= 1945 California Golden Bears football team =

American college football season

1945 California Golden Bears football
- Conference: Pacific Coast Conference
- Record: 4–5–1 (2–4–1 PCC)
- Head coach: Buck Shaw (1st season)
- Home stadium: California Memorial Stadium

1945 Pacific Coast Conference football standings
	Conf.					Overall
Team	W		L		T	W		L		T
No. 11 USC $	5	–	1	–	0	7	–	4	–	0
Washington State	6	–	2	–	1	6	–	2	–	1
Washington	6	–	3	–	0	6	–	3	–	0
Oregon State	4	–	4	–	0	4	–	4	–	1
UCLA	2	–	3	–	0	5	–	4	–	0
California	2	–	4	–	1	4	–	5	–	1
Oregon	3	–	6	–	0	3	–	6	–	0
Idaho	1	–	5	–	0	1	–	7	–	0
Montana	0	–	1	–	0	1	–	4	–	0
$ – Conference champion; Rankings from AP Poll

The 1945 California Golden Bears football team was an American football team that represented the University of California, Berkeley during the 1945 college football season. In their only season under head coach Buck Shaw, the Golden Bears compiled an overall record of 4–5–1 (2–4–1 in PCC, sixth). Eight games were played on campus at California Memorial Stadium in Berkeley, California.

== Schedule ==
Date	Opponent	Site	Result	Attendance	Source
September 22	Saint Mary's*	California Memorial Stadium; Berkeley, CA	L 13–20	75,000	
September 29	USC	California Memorial Stadium; Berkeley, CA	L 2–13	50,000	
October 6	Washington	California Memorial Stadium; Berkeley, CA	W 27–14	50,000	
October 13	at UCLA	Los Angeles Memorial Coliseum; Los Angeles, CA (rivalry)	L 0–13	40,000	
October 27	Nevada*	California Memorial Stadium; Berkeley, CA	W 19–6	25,000	
November 3	Washington State	California Memorial Stadium; Berkeley, CA	T 7–7	40,000	
November 10	at USC	Los Angeles Memorial Coliseum; Los Angeles, CA	L 0–14	35,000	
November 17	Oregon	California Memorial Stadium; Berkeley, CA	L 13–20	35,000	
November 24	No. 12 UCLA	California Memorial Stadium; Berkeley, CA	W 6–0	25,000	
December 1	Saint Mary's Pre-Flight*	California Memorial Stadium; Berkeley, CA	W 6–0	25,000	
*Non-conference game; Rankings from AP Poll released prior to the game; Source:
