= List of Rutgers Scarlet Knights football seasons =

This is a list of seasons completed by the Rutgers Scarlet Knights football program since the team's conception in 1869. The program competes in the National Collegiate Athletic Association (NCAA) Division I Football Bowl Subdivision (FBS) and the Scarlet Knights have participated in over 1,400 officially sanctioned games, including 11 bowl games. Rutgers originally competed as a football independent and competed in multiple conferences, most recently joining the Big Ten Conference in 2014.

== Seasons ==
| Year | Coach | Overall | Conference | Standing | Bowl/playoffs | Coaches^{#} | AP^{°} |
|---|---|---|---|---|---|---|---|
Independent (1869–1890)
| 1869 | No coach | 1–1 | | | | | |
| 1870 | No coach | 1–1 | | | | | |
| 1871 | No team | | | | | | |
| 1872 | No coach | 1–1–1 | | | | | |
| 1873 | No coach | 1–2 | | | | | |
| 1874 | No coach | 1–3 | | | | | |
| 1875 | No coach | 1–1–1 | | | | | |
| 1876 | No coach | 1–0 | | | | | |
| 1877 | No coach | 1–2 | | | | | |
| 1878 | No coach | 1–2–1 | | | | | |
| 1879 | No coach | 2–1–2 | | | | | |
| 1880 | No coach | 1–2 | | | | | |
| 1881 | No coach | 2–3–1 | | | | | |
| 1882 | No coach | 6–4 | | | | | |
| 1883 | No coach | 1–6 | | | | | |
| 1884 | No coach | 3–4 | | | | | |
| 1885 | No coach | 0–1 | | | | | |
| 1886 | No coach | 1–3 | | | | | |
| 1887 | No coach | 2–6 | | | | | |
| 1888 | No coach | 1–7–1 | | | | | |
| 1889 | No coach | 1–4 | | | | | |
| 1890 | No coach | 5–5–1 | | | | | |
William Ayres Reynolds (Independent) (1891)
| 1891 | William Ayres Reynolds | 8–6 | | | | | |
Independent (1892–1894)
| 1892 | No coach | 3–5–1 | | | | | |
| 1893 | No coach | 0–4 | | | | | |
| 1894 | No coach | 4–6 | | | | | |
H. W. Ambruster (Independent) (1895)
| 1895 | H. W. Ambruster | 3–4 | | | | | |
John C. B. Pendleton (Independent) (1896–1897)
| 1896 | John C. B. Pendleton | 5–7 | | | | | |
| 1897 | John C. B. Pendleton | 2–7 | | | | | |
William V. B. Van Dyck (Independent) (1898–1899)
| 1898 | William V. B. Van Dyck | 1–6–1 | | | | | |
| 1899 | William V. B. Van Dyck | 2–9 | | | | | |
Michael F. Daly (Independent) (1900)
| 1900 | Michael F. Daly | 4–4 | | | | | |
Arthur P. Robinson (Independent) (1901)
| 1901 | Arthur P. Robinson | 0–7 | | | | | |
Henry Van Hoevenberg (Independent) (1902)
| 1902 | Henry Van Hoevenberg | 3–7 | | | | | |
Oliver D. Mann (Independent) (1903)
| 1903 | Oliver D. Mann | 4–4–1 | | | | | |
Alfred Ellet Hitchner (Independent) (1904)
| 1904 | Alfred Ellet Hitchner | 1–6–2 | | | | | |
Oliver D. Mann (Independent) (1905)
| 1905 | Oliver D. Mann | 3–6 | | | | | |
Frank Gorton (Independent) (1906–1907)
| 1906 | Frank Gorton | 5–2–2 | | | | | |
| 1907 | Frank Gorton | 3–5–1 | | | | | |
Joseph Smith (Independent) (1908)
| 1908 | Joseph Smith | 3–5–1 | | | | | |
Herman Pritchard (Independent) (1901)
| 1909 | Herman Pritchard | 3–5–1 | | | | | |
Howard Gargan (Independent) (1910–1912)
| 1910 | Howard Gargan | 3–2–3 | | | | | |
| 1911 | Howard Gargan | 4–4–1 | | | | | |
| 1912 | Howard Gargan | 5–4 | | | | | |
George Sanford (Independent) (1913–1922)
| 1913 | George Sanford | 6–3 | | | | | |
| 1914 | George Sanford | 5–3–1 | | | | | |
| 1915 | George Sanford | 7–1 | | | | | |
| 1916 | George Sanford | 3–2–2 | | | | | |
| 1917 | George Sanford | 7–1–1 | | | | | |
| 1918 | George Sanford | 5–2 | | | | | |
| 1919 | George Sanford | 5–3 | | | | | |
| 1920 | George Sanford | 2–7 | | | | | |
| 1921 | George Sanford | 4–5 | | | | | |
| 1922 | George Sanford | 5–4 | | | | | |
| 1923 | George Sanford | 7–1–1 | | | | | |
John Wallace (Independent) (1924–1926)
| 1924 | John Wallace | 7–1–1 | | | | | |
| 1925 | John Wallace | 2–7 | | | | | |
| 1926 | John Wallace | 3–6 | | | | | |
Harry Rockafeller (Independent) (1927–1930)
| 1927 | Harry Rockafeller | 4–4 | | | | | |
| 1928 | Harry Rockafeller | 6–3 | | | | | |
| 1929 | Harry Rockafeller | 5–4 | | | | | |
| 1930 | Harry Rockafeller | 4–5 | | | | | |
J. Wilder Tasker (Independent) (1931–1937)
| 1931 | J. Wilder Tasker | 4–3–1 | | | | | |
| 1932 | J. Wilder Tasker | 6–3–1 | | | | | |
| 1933 | J. Wilder Tasker | 6–3–1 | | | | | |
| 1934 | J. Wilder Tasker | 5–3–1 | | | | | |
| 1935 | J. Wilder Tasker | 4–5 | | | | | |
| 1936 | J. Wilder Tasker | 1–6–1 | | | | | |
| 1937 | J. Wilder Tasker | 5–4 | | | | | |
Harvey Harman (Independent) (1938–1941)
| 1938 | Harvey Harman | 7–1 | | | | | |
| 1939 | Harvey Harman | 7–1–1 | | | | | |
| 1940 | Harvey Harman | 5–4 | | | | | |
| 1941 | Harvey Harman | 7–2 | | | | | |
Harry Rockafeller (Independent) (1942–1945)
| 1942 | Harry Rockafeller | 3–4–1 | | | | | |
| 1943 | Harry Rockafeller | 3–2 | | | | | |
| 1944 | Harry Rockafeller | 3–2 | | | | | |
| 1945 | Harry Rockafeller | 5–2 | | | | | |
Harvey Harman (Independent) (1946–1955)
| 1946 | Harvey Harman | 7–2 | | | | | |
| 1947 | Harvey Harman | 8–1 | | | | | |
| 1948 | Harvey Harman | 7–2 | | | | | |
| 1949 | Harvey Harman | 6–3 | | | | | |
| 1950 | Harvey Harman | 4–4 | | | | | |
| 1951 | Harvey Harman | 4–4 | | | | | |
| 1952 | Harvey Harman | 4–4–1 | | | | | |
| 1953 | Harvey Harman | 2–6 | | | | | |
| 1954 | Harvey Harman | 3–6 | | | | | |
| 1955 | Harvey Harman | 3–5 | | | | | |
John Stiegman (Independent) (1956–1957)
| 1956 | John Stiegman | 3–7 | | | | | |
| 1957 | John Stiegman | 5–4 | | | | | |
John Stiegman (Middle Atlantic Conference) (1958–1959)
| 1958 | John Stiegman | 8–1 | 4–0 | 1st (University) | | | 20 |
| 1959 | John Stiegman | 6–3 | 2–2 | T–4th (University) | | | |
John F. Bateman (Middle Atlantic Conference) (1960–1961)
| 1960 | John F. Bateman | 8–1 | 4–0 | 1st (University) | | | |
| 1961 | John F. Bateman | 9–0 | 4–0 | 1st (University) | | | 15 |
John F. Bateman (Independent) (1962–1972)
| 1962 | John F. Bateman | 5–5 | | | | | |
| 1963 | John F. Bateman | 3–6 | | | | | |
| 1964 | John F. Bateman | 6–3 | | | | | |
| 1965 | John F. Bateman | 3–6 | | | | | |
| 1966 | John F. Bateman | 5–4 | | | | | |
| 1967 | John F. Bateman | 4–5 | | | | | |
| 1968 | John F. Bateman | 8–2 | | | | | |
| 1969 | John F. Bateman | 6–3 | | | | | |
| 1970 | John F. Bateman | 5–5 | | | | | |
| 1971 | John F. Bateman | 4–7 | | | | | |
| 1972 | John F. Bateman | 7–4 | | | | | |
Frank R. Burns (Independent) (1973–1983)
| 1973 | Frank R. Burns | 6–5 | | | | | |
| 1974 | Frank R. Burns | 7–3–1 | | | | | |
| 1975 | Frank R. Burns | 9–2 | | | | | |
| 1976 | Frank R. Burns | 11–0 | | | | 17 | 17 |
| 1977 | Frank R. Burns | 8–3 | | | | | |
| 1978 | Frank R. Burns | 9–3 | | | L Garden State | | |
| 1979 | Frank R. Burns | 8–3 | | | | | |
| 1980 | Frank R. Burns | 7–4 | | | | | |
| 1981 | Frank R. Burns | 5–6 | | | | | |
| 1982 | Frank R. Burns | 5–6 | | | | | |
| 1983 | Frank R. Burns | 3–8 | | | | | |
Dick Anderson (Independent) (1984–1989)
| 1984 | Dick Anderson | 7–3 | | | | | |
| 1985 | Dick Anderson | 2–8–1 | | | | | |
| 1986 | Dick Anderson | 6–4–1 | | | | | |
| 1987 | Dick Anderson | 6–5 | | | | | |
| 1988 | Dick Anderson | 5–6 | | | | | |
| 1989 | Dick Anderson | 2–7–2 | | | | | |
Doug Graber (Independent) (1990)
| 1990 | Doug Graber | 3–8 | | | | | |
Doug Graber (Big East Conference) (1991–1995)
| 1991 | Doug Graber | 6–5 | 2–3 | (Note: The Big East did not crown an official champion until 1993 when full league play began.) | | | |
| 1992 | Doug Graber | 7–4 | 4–2 | | | | |
| 1993 | Doug Graber | 4–7 | 1–6 | 7th | | | |
| 1994 | Doug Graber | 5–5–1 | 2–4–1 | 6th | | | |
| 1995 | Doug Graber | 4–7 | 2–5 | 6th | | | |
Terry Shea (Big East Conference) (1996–2000)
| 1996 | Terry Shea | 2–9 | 1–6 | 7th | | | |
| 1997 | Terry Shea | 0–11 | 0–7 | 8th | | | |
| 1998 | Terry Shea | 5–6 | 2–5 | T–6th | | | |
| 1999 | Terry Shea | 1–10 | 1–6 | 8th | | | |
| 2000 | Terry Shea | 3–8 | 0–7 | 8th | | | |
Greg Schiano (Big East Conference) (2001–2011)
| 2001 | Greg Schiano | 2–9 | 0–7 | 8th | | | |
| 2002 | Greg Schiano | 1–11 | 0–7 | 8th | | | |
| 2003 | Greg Schiano | 5–7 | 2–5 | 7th | | | |
| 2004 | Greg Schiano | 4–7 | 1–5 | 6th | | | |
| 2005 | Greg Schiano | 7–5 | 4–3 | 3rd | L Insight | | |
| 2006 | Greg Schiano | 11–2 | 5–2 | T–2nd | W Texas | 12 | 12 |
| 2007 | Greg Schiano | 8–5 | 3–4 | T–5th | W International | | |
| 2008 | Greg Schiano | 8–5 | 5–2 | T–2nd | W Papajohns.com | | |
| 2009 | Greg Schiano | 9–4 | 3–4 | T–4th | W St. Petersburg | | |
| 2010 | Greg Schiano | 4–8 | 1–6 | 8th | | | |
| 2011 | Greg Schiano | 9–4 | 4–3 | T–4th | W Pinstripe | | |
Kyle Flood (Big East Conference) (2012)
| 2012 | Kyle Flood | 9–4 | 5–2 | T–1st | L Russell Athletic | | |
Kyle Flood (American Athletic Conference) (2013)
| 2013 | Kyle Flood | 6–7 | 3–5 | T–6th | L Pinstripe | | |
Kyle Flood (Big Ten Conference) (2014–2015)
| 2014 | Kyle Flood | 8–5 | 3–5 | T–4th (East) | W Quick Lane | | |
| 2015 | Kyle Flood (Note: The season began with controversies over an investigation into violations of NCAA regulations and school policy concerning coach Flood's improper contacting of a professor concerning a student's academic status; and the arrests and dismissal of several football players on violent felony charges connected to an April 2015 home invasion robbery in New Brunswick. Coach Flood was suspended for three games after the investigation found improper contact was made and Norries Wilson served as interim.) | 4–8 | 1–7 | T–6th (East) | | | |
Chris Ash (Big Ten Conference) (2016–2019)
| 2016 | Chris Ash | 2–10 | 0–9 | 7th (East) | | | |
| 2017 | Chris Ash | 4–8 | 3–6 | 5th (East) | | | |
| 2018 | Chris Ash | 1–11 | 0–9 | 7th (East) | | | |
| 2019 | Chris Ash (Note: On September 29, 2019, Ash was fired after four games. Nunzio Campanile was the interim head coach for the remainder of the season.) | 2–10 | 0–9 | 7th (East) | | | |
Greg Schiano (Big Ten Conference) (2020–present)
| 2020 | Greg Schiano | 3–6 | 3–6 | 5th (East) | | | |
| 2021 | Greg Schiano | 5–8 | 2–7 | 6th (East) | L Gator | | |
| 2022 | Greg Schiano | 4–8 | 1–8 | 7th (East) | | | |
| 2023 | Greg Schiano | 7–6 | 3–6 | 5th (East) | W Pinstripe | | |
| 2024 | Greg Schiano | 7–6 | 4–5 | T–9th | L Rate | | |
| 2025 | Greg Schiano | 5–7 | 2–7 | T–14th | | | |
| Total: | | 679–702–42 | | | | | |
National championship Conference title Conference division title or championship game berth
^{†}Indicates Bowl Coalition, Bowl Alliance, BCS, or CFP / New Years' Six bowl.; ^{#}Rankings from final Coaches Poll.
