= 1937 Lehigh Engineers football team =

American college football season

1937 Lehigh Engineers football
- Conference: Middle Three Conference
- Record: 1–8 (0–2 Middle Three)
- Head coach: Glen Harmeson (4th season)
- Captains: Frederick Bayer; John Hoppock
- Home stadium: Taylor Stadium

1937 Middle Three Conference football standings
	Conf.					Overall
Team	W		L		T	W		L		T
Lafayette $	2	–	0	–	0	8	–	0	–	0
Rutgers	1	–	1	–	0	5	–	4	–	0
Lehigh	0	–	2	–	0	1	–	8	–	0
$ – Conference champion

The 1937 Lehigh Engineers football team was an American football team that represented Lehigh University during the 1937 college football season. In its fourth season under head coach Glen Harmeson, the team compiled a 1–8 record, and lost both games against its Middle Three Conference rivals. Lehigh played home games at Taylor Stadium in Bethlehem, Pennsylvania.

== Schedule ==
Date	Opponent	Site	Result	Attendance	Source
September 25	Case*	Taylor Stadium; Bethlehem, PA	L 7–14	8,000	
October 2	at Boston University*	Fenway Park; Boston, MA	L 6–33	5,000	
October 9	Johns Hopkins*	Taylor Stadium; Bethlehem, PA	W 32–0		
October 16	at Penn State*	New Beaver Field; State College, PA	L 7–14	10,000	
October 23	Gettysburg*	Taylor Stadium; Bethlehem, PA	L 6–19	8,000	
October 30	at Rutgers	Neilson Field; New Brunswick, NJ	L 0–34	9,000	
November 6	at NYU*	Yankee Stadium; Bronx, NY	L 0–13	11,000	
November 13	Muhlenberg*	Taylor Stadium; Bethlehem, PA	L 7–18	9,000	
November 20	Lafayette	Taylor Stadium; Bethlehem, PA (rivalry)	L 0–6	11,000	
*Non-conference game
