= 1938 Lehigh Engineers football team =

American college football season

1938 Lehigh Engineers football
- Conference: Middle Three Conference
- Record: 2–5–2 (0–2 Middle Three)
- Head coach: Glen Harmeson (5th season)
- Captain: Marcus Wertz Jr.
- Home stadium: Taylor Stadium

1938 Middle Three Conference football standings
	Conf.					Overall
Team	W		L		T	W		L		T
Rutgers $	2	–	0	–	0	7	–	1	–	0
Lafayette	1	–	1	–	0	5	–	3	–	0
Lehigh	0	–	2	–	0	2	–	5	–	2
$ – Conference champion

The 1938 Lehigh Engineers football team was an American football team that represented Lehigh University during the 1938 college football season. In its fifth season under head coach Glen Harmeson, the team compiled a 2–5–2 record, and lost both games against its Middle Three Conference rivals. Lehigh played home games at Taylor Stadium in Bethlehem, Pennsylvania.

== Schedule ==
Date	Opponent	Site	Result	Attendance	Source
September 24	Pennsylvania Military*	Taylor Stadium; Bethlehem, PA	W 16–13	7,000	
October 1	Boston University*	Taylor Stadium; Bethlehem, PA	T 6–6		
October 8	at Case*	Van Horn Field; Cleveland, OH	T 0–0		
October 15	Penn State*	Taylor Stadium; Bethlehem, PA	L 6–59		
October 22	at Delaware*	Frazer Field; Newark, DE (rivalry)	W 32–0		
October 29	Rutgers	Taylor Stadium; Bethlehem, PA	L 0–13	9,000	
November 5	at NYU*	Ohio Field; Bronx, NY	L 0–45	8,000	
November 12	Muhlenberg*	Taylor Stadium; Bethlehem, PA	L 0–20	8,000	
November 19	at Lafayette	Fisher Field; Easton, PA (rivalry)	L 0–6	14,000	
*Non-conference game
