= 1943 Lehigh Engineers football team =

American college football season

1943 Lehigh Engineers football
- Conference: Middle Three Conference
- Record: 0–5–1 (0–4 Middle Three)
- Head coach: Leo Prendergast (1st season)
- Captain: John Donahue
- Home stadium: Taylor Stadium

1943 Middle Three Conference football standings
| | Conf. | | | | | Overall |
| Team | W | | L | | T | W | | L | | T |
|---|---|---|---|---|---|---|---|---|---|---|
| Lafayette + | 3 | – | 1 | – | 0 | 4 | – | 1 | – | 0 |
| Rutgers + | 3 | – | 1 | – | 0 | 3 | – | 2 | – | 0 |
| Lehigh | 0 | – | 4 | – | 0 | 0 | – | 5 | – | 1 |
+ – Conference co-champions

The 1943 Lehigh Engineers football team was an American football team that represented Lehigh University during the 1943 college football season. In its first season under head coach Leo Prendergast, the team compiled a 0–5–1 record, and lost all four games against its Middle Three Conference rivals. Lehigh played home games at Taylor Stadium in Bethlehem, Pennsylvania.

In the final Litkenhous Ratings, Lehigh ranked 226th among the nation's college and service teams with a rating of 27.1.

== Schedule ==
| Date | Opponent | Site | Result | Attendance | Source |
|---|---|---|---|---|---|
| October 16 | at Carnegie Tech* | Pittsburgh, PA | T 0–0 | | |
| October 23 | at Lafayette | Fisher Field; Easton, PA (rivalry) | L 7–39 | | |
| October 30 | at Rutgers | Rutgers Stadium; Piscataway, NJ | L 6–26 | 2,500 | |
| November 6 | West Virginia* | Taylor Stadium; Bethlehem, PA | L 6–53 | | |
| November 13 | Rutgers | Taylor Stadium; Bethlehem, PA | L 0–20 | | |
| November 27 | Lafayette | Taylor Stadium; Bethlehem, PA (rivalry) | L 0–58 | 3,500 | |
*Non-conference game
