= 1942 Rutgers Queensmen football team =

American college football season

1942 Rutgers Queensmen football
- Conference: Middle Three Conference
- Record: 3–4–1 (0–2 Middle Three)
- Head coach: Harry Rockafeller (5th season)
- Captain: Kenneth MacDonald
- Home stadium: Rutgers Stadium

1942 Middle Three Conference football standings
| | Conf. | | | | | Overall |
| Team | W | | L | | T | W | | L | | T |
|---|---|---|---|---|---|---|---|---|---|---|
| Lehigh + | 1 | – | 0 | – | 1 | 5 | – | 2 | – | 1 |
| Lafayette + | 1 | – | 0 | – | 1 | 3 | – | 5 | – | 1 |
| Rutgers | 0 | – | 2 | – | 0 | 3 | – | 4 | – | 1 |
$ – Conference champion

The 1942 Rutgers Queensmen football team represented Rutgers University in the 1942 college football season. In February 1942, following the Japanese attack on Pearl Harbor, Rutgers head coach Harman, who had led the team to a 26-7-1 record from 1938 to 1941, joined the United States Navy. In April 1942, Harry Rockafeller, who had coached the team from 1927 to 1930, resumed responsibility as Rutgers' head football coach. In their fifth, non-consecutive season under head coach Harry Rockafeller, the Queensmen compiled a 3–4–1 record and were outscored by their opponents 113 to 100.

Rutgers was ranked at No. 161 (out of 590 college and military teams) in the final rankings under the Litkenhous Difference by Score System for 1942.

== Schedule ==
| Date | Opponent | Site | Result | Attendance | Source |
|---|---|---|---|---|---|
| October 3 | Vermont | Rutgers Stadium; Piscataway, NJ | W 27–20 | 3,000 | |
| October 10 | at Maryland | Municipal Stadium; Baltimore, MD | L 13–27 | 15,000 | |
| October 17 | Bucknell | Rutgers Stadium; Piscataway, NJ | W 9–7 | | |
| October 24 | at Lehigh | Taylor Stadium; Bethlehem, PA | L 10–28 | 6,000 | |
| October 31 | Springfield | Rutgers Stadium; Piscataway, NJ | W 21–0 | | |
| November 7 | Lafayette | Rutgers Stadium; Piscataway, NJ | L 13–19 | | |
| November 14 | Fort Monmouth | Rutgers Stadium; Piscataway, NJ | T 0–0 | 3,000 | |
| November 21 | Syracuse | Rutgers Stadium; Piscataway, NJ | L 7–12 | 5,000 | |
