= 1943 Lafayette Leopards football team =

American football club

1943 Lafayette Leopards football

Middle Three co-champion
- Conference: Middle Three Conference
- Record: 4–1 (3–1 Middle Three)
- Head coach: Ben Wolfson (1st season)
- Captain: Walter Sergy
- Home stadium: Fisher Field

1943 Middle Three Conference football standings
| | Conf. | | | | | Overall |
| Team | W | | L | | T | W | | L | | T |
|---|---|---|---|---|---|---|---|---|---|---|
| Lafayette + | 3 | – | 1 | – | 0 | 4 | – | 1 | – | 0 |
| Rutgers + | 3 | – | 1 | – | 0 | 3 | – | 2 | – | 0 |
| Lehigh | 0 | – | 4 | – | 0 | 0 | – | 5 | – | 1 |
+ – Conference co-champions

The 1943 Lafayette Leopards football team was an American football team that represented Lafayette College in the Middle Three Conference during the 1943 college football season. In its first season under head coach Ben Wolfson, the team compiled a 4–1 record (3–1 in conference games), won the Middle Three championship, and outscored opponents by a total of 118 to 22. Walter Sergy was the team captain.

In the final Litkenhous Ratings, Lafayette ranked 111th among the nation's college and service teams with a rating of 63.6.

The team played its home games at Fisher Field in Easton, Pennsylvania.

== Schedule ==
| Date | Opponent | Site | Result | Attendance | Source |
|---|---|---|---|---|---|
| October 16 | Atlantic City NAS* | Fisher Field; Easton, PA | W 12–0 | | |
| October 23 | Lehigh | Fisher Field; Easton, PA (rivalry) | W 39–7 | | |
| November 6 | at Rutgers | Rutgers Stadium; Piscataway, NJ | L 0–13 | 4,000 | |
| November 20 | Rutgers | Fisher Field; Easton, PA | W 9–2 | 7,000 | |
| November 27 | at Lehigh | Taylor Stadium; Bethlethem, PA | W 58–0 | 3,500 | |
*Non-conference game
