= 1937 Lafayette Leopards football team =

American football club

1937 Lafayette Leopards football

Middle Three champion
- Conference: Middle Three Conference
- Record: 8–0 (2–0 Middle Three)
- Head coach: Edward Mylin (1st season)
- Captain: Edward Kanzler
- Home stadium: Fisher Field

1937 Middle Three Conference football standings
	Conf.					Overall
Team	W		L		T	W		L		T
Lafayette $	2	–	0	–	0	8	–	0	–	0
Rutgers	1	–	1	–	0	5	–	4	–	0
Lehigh	0	–	2	–	0	1	–	8	–	0
$ – Conference champion

The 1937 Lafayette Leopards football team was an American football team that represented Lafayette College in the Middle Three Conference during the 1937 college football season. In its first season under head coach Edward Mylin, the team compiled an 8–0 record, won the Middle Three championship, shut out seven of eight opponents, and outscored all opponents by a total of 103 to 6.

Center John Quigg was selected by the Newspaper Enterprise Association (NEA) as a third-team player on the 1937 All-Eastern football team.

Other key players included end Ernest Kanzler who was chosen as the team captain, end Harold Simmons, and halfback Tommy Kearns.

== Schedule ==
Date	Opponent	Site	Result	Source
October 2	Upsala*	Fisher Field; Easton, PA	W 33–0	
October 9	at Gettysburg*	Gettysburg, PA	W 2–0	
October 16	at Georgetown*	Griffith Stadium; Washington, DC	W 6–0	
October 23	at NYU*	Yankee Stadium; New York, NY	W 13–0	
October 30	Franklin & Marshall*	Fisher Field; Easton, PA	W 14–0	
November 6	Rutgers	Fisher Field; Easton, PA	W 13–6	
November 13	Washington & Jefferson*	Fisher Field; Easton, PA	W 16–0	
November 20	at Lehigh	Taylor Stadium; Bethlethem, PA (rivalry)	W 6–0	
*Non-conference game
