= Harry Rockafeller =

American football player, coach, and administrator (1894–1978)

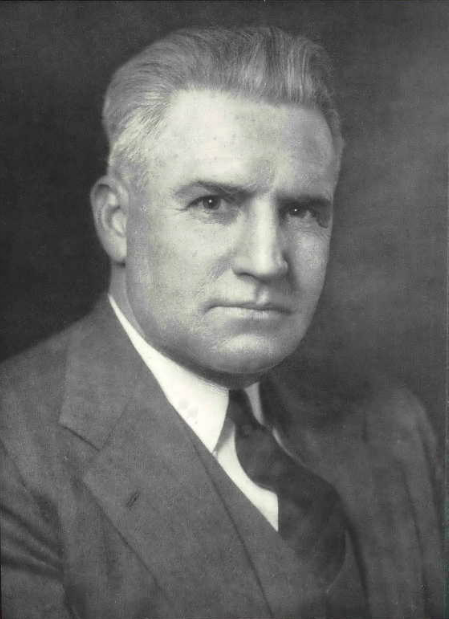

Biographical details
- Born: August 26, 1894; Asbury Park, New Jersey, U.S.
- Died: April 5, 1978 (aged 83); New Jersey, U.S.

Playing career

Football
- 1912–1915: Rutgers

Basketball
- 1913–1916: Rutgers
- Positions: End (football); Guard (basketball)

Coaching career (HC unless noted)

Football
- 1927–1930: Rutgers
- 1942–1945: Rutgers

Administrative career (AD unless noted)
- 1952–1956: Rutgers (acting AD)
- 1956–1961: Rutgers

Head coaching record
- Overall: 33–26–1

Accomplishments and honors

Championships
- 3 Middle Three (1929, 1943, 1945)

Harry Joseph "Rocky" Rockafeller Jr. (August 26, 1894 – April 5, 1978) was an American college football player, coach, and athletics administrator at Rutgers University. He was the head football coach for the Rutgers Scarlet Knights football team for eight years from 1927 to 1930 and from 1942 to 1945. He was also the athletic director until 1961.

== Early years ==
Rockafeller was born in Asbury Park, New Jersey in 1894. His father, Harry J. Rockafeller Sr., was a hotel keeper and, later, a theater manager. He attended Asbury Park High School.

Rockafeller attended Rutgers University where he played at the end position for the Rutgers Scarlet Knights football team for four years from 1912 to 1915. According to Rutgers University records, Rockafeller was selected as an All-American in 1915. He was a teammate of Paul Robeson on the football team. He also played at the guard position for the Rutgers Scarlet Knights men's basketball team and competed for the track team. He graduated from Rutgers in 1916 and is a member of the Cap & Skull Senior Honor Society.

Rockafeller served in the military during World War I. As of June 1917 he was a first lieutenant in the infantry assigned as a student at the Fort Myer Camp in Virginia. At the time of the 1920 U.S. Census, Rockafeller was living with his parents in Asbury Park.

== Rutgers coach and athletic director ==
Rockafeller was hired as Rutgers' graduate manager of athletics in 1925. In February 1927 the Rutgers Council of Athletics announced that Rockafeller would serve as the head football coach of the 1927 football team. He remained as the head football coach from 1927 to 1930. During those seasons, the Rutgers football team compiled a record of 19–16. In December 1930, Rockafeller asked the Council of Athletics to release him from consideration as the head coach for the 1931 team. Rockafeller chose to return to his position as Rutgers' graduate manager of athletics.

The Rutgers Class of 1940 dedicated the 1940 edition of The Scarlet Letter (the Rutgers yearbook) to Rockafeller and wrote:

"To Harry J. Rockafeller, upholder of Scarlet traditions, we dedicate the 1940 Scarlet Letter. Graduate of the University in the Class of 1916, sometimes graduate manager of athletics and head coach of the varsity football team, he is now assistant director and associate professor of physical education. As coach of the 150-pound football team, he brought two successive championships to Rutgers in League competition; in 1939 he was given the University Award 'for faithful and unselfish service.' It is not because of these accomplishments that we pay him tribute, however. It is because of our respect and admiration and affection for 'Rocky' himself. He is our ideal of what a Rutgers man should be: friendly, honest, generous, of kindly heart, and a straight shooter."

In April 1942, Rockafeller resumed responsibility as the head football coach at Rutgers after head coach Harvey Harman was inducted into the United States Navy as a lieutenant commander. In November 1945, Rockafeller announced that he would step down as the head coach at the end of the 1945 season.

Rockafeller became acting athletic director at Rutgers in 1952 and athletic director in 1956. He stepped down as the athletic director in June 1961.

== Family and later years ==
Rockafeller was married in June 1935 to Mary Olney. At the time of the 1940 United States Census, Rockafeller was living in Piscataway, New Jersey with his wife, Mary, and their two-year-old son, Thomas O. Rockafeller. His occupation was listed in the census record as the assistant director of athletics at a college. He died in April 1978 at age 83.

== Head coaching record ==
| Year | Team | Overall | Conference | Standing | Bowl/playoffs |
|---|---|---|---|---|---|
Rutgers Queensmen (Independent) (1927–1928)
| 1927 | Rutgers | 4–4 | | | |
| 1928 | Rutgers | 6–3 | | | |
Rutgers Queensmen (Middle Three Conference) (1929–1930)
| 1929 | Rutgers | 5–4 | 1–1 | T–1st | |
| 1930 | Rutgers | 4–5 | 1–1 | 2nd | |
Rutgers Queensmen (Middle Three Conference) (1942–1945)
| 1942 | Rutgers | 3–4–1 | 0–2 | 3rd | |
| 1943 | Rutgers | 3–2 | 3–1 | T–1st | |
| 1944 | Rutgers | 3–2 | 2–2 | 2nd | |
| 1945 | Rutgers | 5–2 | 2–0 | 1st | |
| Rutgers: | | 33–26–1 | 9–7 | | |
| Total: | | 33–26–1 | | | |
National championship Conference title Conference division title or championship game berth
