= 1950 Lehigh Engineers football team =

American college football season

1950 Lehigh Engineers football

Middle Three champion
- Conference: Middle Three Conference
- Record: 9–0 (2–0 Middle Three)
- Head coach: Bill Leckonby (5th season)
- Home stadium: Taylor Stadium

1950 Middle Three Conference football standings
	Conf.					Overall
Team	W		L		T	W		L		T
Lehigh $	2	–	0	–	0	9	–	0	–	0
Rutgers	1	–	1	–	0	4	–	4	–	0
Lafayette	0	–	2	–	0	1	–	8	–	0
$ – Conference champion

The 1950 Lehigh Engineers football team was an American football team that represented Lehigh University during the 1950 college football season. In its fifth season under head coach Bill Leckonby, the team compiled a 9–0 record (their first undefeated record in the football program's history) and won the Middle Three Conference championship. The Engineers outscored their opponents, 301 to 77. They gained 2,120 rushing yards (235.6 per game) and 801 passing yards. On defense, they held opponents to 905 rushing yards (100.6 per game) and 1,093 passing yards.

Right halback Dick Doyne, a senior from Larchmont, New York, led the east with 994 rushing yards on 156 carries. He also led the east in punting with an average of 41.5 yards on 25 punts. He was called Lehigh's "Mr. Everything" as he also led the team with an average of 5.7 yards per carry and total offense (1,206 yards), punt returns (13.6-yard average), and kickoff returns (16-yard average). His 72 points (12 touchdowns) tied for the most on the team. He was selected as a first-team back on the 1950 Little All-America college football team. The team's other individual leaders were:

- Left halfback Dick Gabriel tied with Doyne for the team's scoring lead at 72 points. Gabriel and Doyne were both chosen as first-team backs on the Associated Press All-Pennsylvania team.
- Quarterback Herbert Weiss completed 39 of 85 passes for 718 yards, seven touchdowns, and seven interceptions.
- Left end John Bergman was Lehigh's leading receiver with 19 catches for 350 yards.
- Guard Bill Ciarvino was selected as a second-team player on the All-Pennsylvania team.

Lehigh played its home games at Taylor Stadium in Bethlehem, Pennsylvania.

== Schedule ==
Date	Opponent	Rank	Site	Result	Attendance	Source
September 23	Delaware*		Taylor Stadium; Bethlehem, PA (rivalry)	W 21–0	6,000	
September 30	at Case Tech*		Shaw Stadium; East Cleveland, OH	W 21–0	3,000	
October 7	at Bucknell*		Memorial Stadium; Lewisburg, PA	W 27–20	5,500	
October 14	Gettysburg*		Taylor Stadium; Bethlehem, PA	W 49–6	7,500	
October 21	at Dartmouth*		Memorial Stadium; Hanover, NH	W 16–6	12,350	
October 28	Rutgers		Taylor Stadium; Bethlehem, PA	W 21–14	12,000	
November 4	Muhlenberg*		Taylor Stadium; Bethlehem, PA	W 42–18	10,000	
November 11	Carnegie Tech*	No. 20	Taylor Stadium; Bethlehem, PA	W 66–13	12,000	
November 18	at Lafayette		Fisher Field; Easton, PA (The Rivalry)	W 38–0	20,000	
*Non-conference game; Rankings from AP Poll released prior to the game
