= 1950 Lafayette Leopards football team =

American college football season

1950 Lafayette Leopards football
- Conference: Middle Three Conference
- Record: 1–8 (0–2 Middle Three)
- Head coach: Clipper Smith (2nd season)
- Captains: Jay Barclay; Joseph Diamond
- Home stadium: Fisher Field

1950 Middle Three Conference football standings
	Conf.					Overall
Team	W		L		T	W		L		T
Lehigh $	2	–	0	–	0	9	–	0	–	0
Rutgers	1	–	1	–	0	4	–	4	–	0
Lafayette	0	–	2	–	0	1	–	8	–	0
$ – Conference champion

The 1950 Lafayette Leopards football team was an American football team that represented Lafayette College in the Middle Three Conference during the 1950 college football season. In its second season under head coach Clipper Smith, the team compiled a 1–8 record. Jay Barclay and Joseph Diamond were the team captains. The team played home games at Fisher Field in Easton, Pennsylvania.

== Schedule ==
Date	Opponent	Site	Result	Attendance	Source
September 23	Fordham*	Fisher Field; Easton, PA	L 19–20	12,000	
September 30	at Cornell*	Schoellkopf Field; Ithaca, NY	L 0–27	14,000	
October 7	Scranton*	Fisher Field; Easton, PA	L 7–20	8,000	
October 14	at Muhlenberg*	Allentown High School Stadium; Allentown, PA	L 6–21	8,500	
October 21	at Delaware*	Wilmington Park; Wilmington, DE	W 9–7	6,400	
October 28	at Bucknell*	Memorial Stadium; Lewisburg, PA	L 0–32	6,500	
November 4	Syracuse*^{†}	Fisher Field; Easton, PA	L 0–34	8,000	
November 11	at Rutgers	Rutgers Stadium; Piscataway, NJ	L 7–31	9,000	
November 18	Lehigh	Fisher Field; Easton, PA (The Rivalry)	L 0–38	20,000	
*Non-conference game; ^{†}Homecoming
