= 1937 Rutgers Queensmen football team =

American college football season

1937 Rutgers Queensmen football
- Conference: Middle Three Conference
- Record: 5–4 (1–1 Middle Three)
- Head coach: J. Wilder Tasker (7th season)
- Captain: Arthur C. Perry
- Home stadium: Neilson Field

1937 Middle Three Conference football standings
	Conf.					Overall
Team	W		L		T	W		L		T
Lafayette $	2	–	0	–	0	8	–	0	–	0
Rutgers	1	–	1	–	0	5	–	4	–	0
Lehigh	0	–	2	–	0	1	–	8	–	0
$ – Conference champion

The 1937 Rutgers Queensmen football team represented Rutgers University in the 1937 college football season. In their seventh season under head coach J. Wilder Tasker, the Queensmen compiled a 5–6 record and outscored their opponents 128 to 39. In February 1938, Rutgers announced Tasker's resignation as Rutgers' football coach and his replacement by Harvey Harman.

== Schedule ==
Date	Opponent	Site	Result	Attendance	Source
September 25	Susquehanna	Neilson Field; New Brunswick, NJ	W 9–0	6,000	
October 2	Hampden–Sydney	Neilson Field; New Brunswick, NJ	W 20–0		
October 9	Delaware	Neilson Field; New Brunswick, NJ	W 27–0		
October 16	at Springfield	Pratt Field; Springfield, MA	W 26–0	2,500	
October 23	at Princeton	Palmer Stadium; Princeton, NJ (rivalry)	L 0–6	35,000	
October 30	Lehigh	Neilson Field; New Brunswick, NJ	W 34–0	9,000	
November 6	at Lafayette	Fisher Field; Easton, PA	L 6–13		
November 13	Ohio	Neilson Field; New Brunswick, NJ	L 0–13	4,000	
November 25	at Brown	Brown Field; Providence, RI	L 6–7	10,000	
