= 1938 Lafayette Leopards football team =

American football club

1938 Lafayette Leopards football
- Conference: Middle Three Conference
- Record: 5–3 (1–1 Middle Three)
- Head coach: Edward Mylin (2nd season)
- Captains: Harold Simmons; Norbert Weldon
- Home stadium: Fisher Field

1938 Middle Three Conference football standings
	Conf.					Overall
Team	W		L		T	W		L		T
Rutgers $	2	–	0	–	0	7	–	1	–	0
Lafayette	1	–	1	–	0	5	–	3	–	0
Lehigh	0	–	2	–	0	2	–	5	–	2
$ – Conference champion

The 1938 Lafayette Leopards football team was an American football team that represented Lafayette College in the Middle Three Conference during the 1938 college football season. In its second season under head coach Edward Mylin, the team compiled a 5–3 record. Harold Simmons and Norbert Weldon were the team captains.

== Schedule ==
Date	Opponent	Site	Result	Attendance	Source
October 1	at Penn*	Franklin Field; Philadelphia, PA	L 6–34		
October 8	at Brown*	Andrews Field; Providence, RI	L 0–20		
October 15	Washington & Jefferson*	Fisher Field; Easton, PA	W 7–6		
October 22	NYU*	Fisher Field; Easton, PA	W 7–6	10,000	
October 29	Ursinus*	Fisher Field; Easton, PA	W 39–0		
November 5	at Penn State*	New Beaver Field; State College, PA	W 7–0	8,274	
November 12	at Rutgers	Rutgers Stadium; Piscataway, NJ	L 0–6		
November 19	Lehigh	Fisher Field; Easton, PA (rivalry)	W 6–0	14,000	
*Non-conference game
