= Edward Mylin =

American athlete (1894–1975)

- Mylin c. 1930

Biographical details
- Born: October 23, 1894; Leaman Place, Pennsylvania, U.S.
- Died: June 19, 1975 (aged 80); Lancaster, Pennsylvania, U.S.

Playing career

Football
- 1913–1916: Franklin & Marshall
- Position: Quarterback

Coaching career (HC unless noted)

Football
- 1919: Massanutten Military (VA)
- early 1920s: Iowa State (assistant)
- 1923–1933: Lebanon Valley
- 1934–1936: Bucknell
- 1937–1942: Lafayette
- 1945: Camp Lee
- 1946: Lafayette
- 1947–1949: NYU

Basketball
- 1923–1934: Lebanon Valley

Baseball
- 1923–1934: Lebanon Valley
- 1935–1937: Bucknell

Head coaching record
- Overall: 106–99–17 (college football); 93–82 (college basketball); 95–95–3 (college baseball)
- Bowls: 1–0

Accomplishments and honors

Championships
- Football; 4 Middle Three (1937, 1940–1942)

Awards
- Football; AFCA Coach of the Year (1937)
- College Football Hall of Fame; Inducted in 1974 (profile)

Edward Everett "Hook" Mylin (October 23, 1894 – June 19, 1975) was an American football player and coach of football, basketball, and baseball. He served as the head coach at Lebanon Valley College from 1923 to 1933, Bucknell University from 1934 to 1936, Lafayette College from 1937 to 1942 and again in 1946, and New York University (NYU) from 1947 to 1949. Mylin was also the head basketball coach at Lebanon Valley from 1923 to 1934 and the head baseball coach at Bucknell from 1935 to 1937. He was inducted into the College Football Hall of Fame as a coach in 1974.

== Playing career and military service ==
Mylin attended Franklin & Marshall College, where he played football as a quarterback and was a member of Chi Phi fraternity before graduating in 1916. He served as a lieutenant in the United States Army during World War I and was wounded in France.

== Head coaching record ==
=== College football ===
Year	Team	Overall	Conference	Standing	Bowl/playoffs	AP^{#}
Lebanon Valley Flying Dutchmen (Independent) (1923–1933)
1923	Lebanon Valley	4–4–1				
1924	Lebanon Valley	5–2–2				
1925	Lebanon Valley	2–3–3				
1926	Lebanon Valley	4–4				
1927	Lebanon Valley	2–5–1				
1928	Lebanon Valley	2–5–2				
1929	Lebanon Valley	2–6–1				
1930	Lebanon Valley	4–6				
1931	Lebanon Valley	4–4				
1932	Lebanon Valley	4–4				
1933	Lebanon Valley	5–2–2				
Lebanon Valley:		38–45–12				
Bucknell Bison (Independent) (1934–1936)
1934	Bucknell	7–2–2			W Orange	
1935	Bucknell	6–3				
1936	Bucknell	4–4–1				
Bucknell:		17–9–3				
Lafayette Leopards (Middle Three Conference) (1937–1942)
1937	Lafayette	8–0	2–0	1st		
1938	Lafayette	5–3	1–1	2nd		
1939	Lafayette	4–5	1–1	2nd		
1940	Lafayette	9–0	2–0	1st		19
1941	Lafayette	5–4	2–0	1st		
1942	Lafayette	3–5–1	1–0–1	T–1st		
Camp Lee Travellers (Independent) (1945)
1945	Camp Lee	7–4				
Camp Lee:		7–4				
Lafayette Leopards (Middle Three Conference) (1946)
1946	Lafayette	2–7	1–1	2nd		
Lafayette:		36–24–1	10–3–1			
NYU Violets (Independent) (1947–1949)
1947	NYU	2–5–1				
1948	NYU	3–6				
1949	NYU	3–6				
NYU:		8–17–1				
Total:		106–99–17				
National championship Conference title Conference division title or championship game berth
^{#}Rankings from final AP Poll.
