= Leo Prendergast =

American football player and sports coach (1902–1967)

- Prendergast pictured in Epitome 1946, Lehigh yearbook

Biographical details
- Born: August 25, 1902
- Died: September 1967 (aged 65)

Playing career

Football
- 1922: Lafayette
- 1923–1925: St. John's
- Positions: Tackle, end

Coaching career (HC unless noted)

Football
- 1927–1937: Liberty HS (PA)
- 1942: Lehigh (line)
- 1943–1945: Lehigh

Basketball
- 1943–1946: Lehigh

Head coaching record
- Overall: 3–15–1 (college football); 9–41 (college basketball)

Leo F. Prendergast (August 25, 1902 – September 1967) was an American football player and coach of football and basketball. He served as the head football coach at Lehigh University from 1943 to 1945, compiling a record of 3–15–1. P Prendergast was also head basketball coach at Lehigh from 1943 to 1946, tallying a mark of 9–41.

== Biography ==
A native of Easton, Pennsylvania, Prendergast attended Easton High School, where he lettered in football, basketball, baseball, and track. He moved on to Allentown Prep, where he lettered in football, basketball, and baseball during the 1919–20 school year. He then matriculated at The Kiski School in Saltsburg, Pennsylvania in 1921, where he played football alongside Bill Amos and also lettered in basketball and track.

Prendergast attended Lafayette College, where he played football as a tackle under Jock Sutherland in 1922. He then transferred to St. John's College—now known as St. John's University in New York City. There he was captain of the 1923 St. John's Red and White football team, playing as an end.

In 1927, Prendergast was hired at Liberty High School in Bethlehem, Pennsylvania, succeeding A. Austin Tate as football and baseball coach, and was also tasked with coaching basketball and track.

He served as the head football coach at Lehigh University, located in Bethlehem, from 1943 to 1945, compiling a record of 3–15–1. P Prendergast was also head basketball coach at Lehigh from 1943 to 1946, tallying a mark of 9–41.

On March 20, 1947, Prendergast resigned his position at Lehigh to take a job as head coach of the Bethlehem Bulldogs of the American Football League. His Bethlehem contract was to run for three years.

== Head coaching record ==
=== College football ===
Year	Team	Overall	Conference	Standing	Bowl/playoffs
Lehigh Engineers (Middle Three Conference) (1943–1945)
1943	Lehigh	0–5–1	0–4	3rd	
1944	Lehigh	0–6	0–4	3rd	
1945	Lehigh	2–4	0–2	3rd	
Lehigh:		3–15–1	0–10		
Total:		3–15–1			
