= 1950 Rutgers Queensmen football team =

American college football season

1950 Rutgers Queensmen football
- Conference: Middle Three Conference
- Record: 4–4 (1–1 Middle Three)
- Head coach: Harvey Harman (9th season)
- Captain: Leon Root
- Home stadium: Rutgers Stadium

1950 Middle Three Conference football standings
	Conf.					Overall
Team	W		L		T	W		L		T
Lehigh $	2	–	0	–	0	9	–	0	–	0
Rutgers	1	–	1	–	0	4	–	4	–	0
Lafayette	0	–	2	–	0	1	–	8	–	0
$ – Conference champion

The 1950 Rutgers Queensmen football team represented Rutgers University in the 1950 college football season. In their ninth season under head coach Harvey Harman, the Queensemen compiled a 4–4 record and outscored their opponents 186 to 154.

== Schedule ==
Date	Opponent	Site	Result	Attendance	Source
September 23	at Syracuse	Archbold Stadium; Syracuse, NY	L 12–42	16,481	
October 7	at Princeton	Palmer Stadium; Princeton, NJ (rivalry)	L 28–34	23,000	
October 14	Temple	Rutgers Stadium; Piscataway, NJ	W 26–20	14,000	
October 21	NYU	Rutgers Stadium; Piscataway, NJ	W 42–0	10,000	
October 28	at Lehigh	Taylor Stadium; Bethlehem, PA	L 18–21	12,000	
November 4	Brown	Rutgers Stadium; Piscataway, NJ	W 15–12	14,000	
November 11	Lafayette	Rutgers Stadium; Piscataway, NJ	W 31–7	9,000	
November 18	at Penn State	New Beaver Field; State College, PA	L 14–18	15,000	
