= 1942 Lehigh Engineers football team =

American college football season

1942 Lehigh Engineers football

Middle Three co-champion
- Conference: Middle Three Conference
- Record: 5–2–1 (1–0–1 Middle Three)
- Head coach: George Hoban (1st season)
- Captain: Bernie Deehan
- Home stadium: Taylor Stadium

1942 Middle Three Conference football standings
| | Conf. | | | | | Overall |
| Team | W | | L | | T | W | | L | | T |
|---|---|---|---|---|---|---|---|---|---|---|
| Lehigh + | 1 | – | 0 | – | 1 | 5 | – | 2 | – | 1 |
| Lafayette + | 1 | – | 0 | – | 1 | 3 | – | 5 | – | 1 |
| Rutgers | 0 | – | 2 | – | 0 | 3 | – | 4 | – | 1 |
$ – Conference champion

The 1942 Lehigh Engineers football team was an American football team that represented Lehigh University during the 1942 college football season. In its first and only season under head coach George Hoban, the team compiled a 5–2–1 record, with one win and one tie against its Middle Three Conference rivals. Lehigh played home games at Taylor Stadium in Bethlehem, Pennsylvania.

Lehigh was ranked at No. 121 (out of 590 college and military teams) in the final rankings under the Litkenhous Difference by Score System for 1942.

== Schedule ==
| Date | Opponent | Site | Result | Attendance | Source |
|---|---|---|---|---|---|
| October 3 | at Yale* | Yale Bowl; New Haven, CT | L 6–33 | 10,000 | |
| October 10 | Penn State* | Taylor Stadium; Bethlehem, PA | L 3–19 | 7,000 | |
| October 17 | Pennsylvania Military* | Taylor Stadium; Bethlehem, PA | W 13–0 | | |
| October 24 | Rutgers | Taylor Stadium; Bethlehem, PA | W 28–10 | 6,000 | |
| October 31 | Hampden–Sydney* | Taylor Stadium; Bethlehem, PA | W 51–6 | 9,000 | |
| November 7 | Muhlenberg* | Taylor Stadium; Bethlehem, PA | W 22–6 | 12,000 | |
| November 14 | Dickinson* | Taylor Stadium; Bethlehem, PA | W 7–0 | 3,500 | |
| November 21 | at Lafayette | Fisher Field; Easton, PA (rivalry) | T 7–7 | 16,000 | |
*Non-conference game
