= 1945 Camp Lee Travellers football team =

American college football season

1945 Camp Lee Travellers football
- Conference: Independent
- Record: 7–4
- Head coach: Edward Mylin (1st season)
- Home stadium: Nowak Field

1945 military service football records
	Conf.					Overall
Team	W		L		T	W		L		T
Army Air Forces League
Third Air Force +	4	–	1	–	1	7	–	2	–	1
AAF Training Command +	4	–	1	–	1	8	–	3	–	1
Fourth Air Force	3	–	2	–	1	6	–	3	–	1
First Air Force	2	–	2	–	2	3	–	2	–	3
Air Transport Command	2	–	3	–	1	6	–	3	–	2
Personnel Distribution Command	2	–	4	–	0	6	–	5	–	0
Second Air Force	1	–	5	–	0	3	–	7	–	0
Independents
Fleet City			–			11	–	0	–	1
Jacksonville NAS			–			9	–	2	–	0
Hutchinson NAS			–			8	–	0	–	0
Selman Field			–			8	–	1	–	0
El Toro Marines			–			8	–	2	–	0
Corpus Christi NAS			–			7	–	1	–	0
North Camp Hood			–			7	–	1	–	0
Little Creek			–			7	–	2	–	0
Santa Barbara Marines			–			7	–	3	–	1
Camp Lee			–			7	–	4	–	0
Camp Beale			–			6	–	1	–	2
Farragut NTS			–			6	–	2	–	0
Eastern Flying Training Command			–			6	–	3	–	1
Great Lakes Navy			–			6	–	4	–	1
Hondo AAF			–			6	–	4	–	1
South Camp Hood			–			5	–	2	–	0
Camp Peary			–			5	–	3	–	0
Bainbridge			–			5	–	4	–	0
Fort Benning			–			5	–	4	–	1
Fort Warren			–			5	–	7	–	0
Fort McClellan			–			4	–	2	–	0
San Diego NTS			–			4	–	2	–	0
Atlantic City NAS			–			4	–	2	–	1
Minter Field			–			4	–	2	–	1
Williams Field			–			4	–	4	–	0
Stockton AAF			–			4	–	5	–	2
Barksdale Field			–			4	–	7	–	0
Fort Pierce			–			4	–	9	–	0
Amarillo AAF			–			3	–	1	–	0
Olathe NAS			–			3	–	2	–	0
Albany Navy			–			3	–	3	–	1
Camp Detrick			–			3	–	4	–	0
Kearney AAF			–			3	–	4	–	0
Bergstrom Field			–			3	–	5	–	1
Keesler Field			–			3	–	6	–	1
Melville PT Boats			–			2	–	1	–	0
Great Bend AAF			–			2	–	4	–	0
Saint Mary's Pre-Flight			–			2	–	4	–	1
Gulfport AAF			–			2	–	5	–	0
Pensacola NAS			–			2	–	7	–	1
Squantum NAS			–			1	–	1	–	0
Camp Blanding			–			1	–	2	–	0
Luke Field			–			1	–	2	–	0
Miami NAS			–			1	–	2	–	0
Miami NTC			–			1	–	3	–	0
NSB New London			–			1	–	3	–	0
Oceana NAS			–			1	–	3	–	0
Fort Riley			–			1	–	4	–	0
Lake Charles AAF			–			1	–	4	–	0
Ellington Field			–			1	–	4	–	1
Cherry Point Marines			–			1	–	8	–	0
Dalhart AAF			–			0	–	3	–	0
Homestead AAB			–			0	–	3	–	0
Fort Monroe			–			0	–	7	–	0
+ – Conference co-champions

The 1945 Camp Lee Travellers football team represented the United States Army post at Camp Lee, located in Prince George County, Virginia, during the 1945 college football season. Led by first-year head coach Edward Mylin, the Travellers compiled a record of 7–4. The team's roster included Levi Jackson and John Mellus. The 11 games played by Camp Lee drew a total of 123,000 fans.

Camp Lee was ranked 77th among the nation's college and service teams in the final Litkenhous Ratings.

== Schedule ==
Date	Time	Opponent	Site	Result	Attendance	Source
September 22	2:00 p.m.	North Carolina	Nowak Field; Camp Lee, VA	L 0–6	10,000–12,000	
September 30		vs. New York Giants	Newark, NJ	L 0–21	22,000	
October 6		Camp Peary	Nowak Field; Camp Lee, VA	W 13–10	6,000–10,000	
October 13		Camp Detrick	Nowak Field; Camp Lee, VA	W 33–6	8,000–9,500	
October 21	2:00 p.m.	at Bainbridge	Tome Stadium; Bainbridge, MD	L 0–27	9,000–10,000	
October 27		at Little Creek	Roberts Field; Little Creek, VA	L 7–21	8,000–10,000	
November 3		First Army	Nowak Field; Camp Lee, VA	W 27–18	8,500–10,000	
November 11		Cherry Point Marines	Nowak Field; Camp Lee, VA	W 27–7	9,500–10,000	
November 17	2:00 p.m.	Bainbridge	Nowak Field; Camp Lee, VA	W 26–0	11,000–12,000	
November 25	2:00 p.m.	at Camp Peary	Cary Field; Williamsburg, VA	W 7–6	10,000	
December 2		Little Creek	Nowak Field; Camp Lee, VA	W 12–6	13,000–14,000	
All times are in Eastern time
