= 1945 Little Creek Amphibs football team =

American college football season

1945 Little Creek Amphibs football
- Conference: Independent
- Record: 7–2
- Head coach: Russell L. Waters (1st season)
- Home stadium: Roberts Field, Forman Field

1945 military service football records
| | Conf. | | | | | Overall |
| Team | W | | L | | T | W | | L | | T |
|---|---|---|---|---|---|---|---|---|---|---|
Army Air Forces League
| Third Air Force + | 4 | – | 1 | – | 1 | 7 | – | 2 | – | 1 |
| AAF Training Command + | 4 | – | 1 | – | 1 | 8 | – | 3 | – | 1 |
| Fourth Air Force | 3 | – | 2 | – | 1 | 6 | – | 3 | – | 1 |
| First Air Force | 2 | – | 2 | – | 2 | 3 | – | 2 | – | 3 |
| Air Transport Command | 2 | – | 3 | – | 1 | 6 | – | 3 | – | 2 |
| Personnel Distribution Command | 2 | – | 4 | – | 0 | 6 | – | 5 | – | 0 |
| Second Air Force | 1 | – | 5 | – | 0 | 3 | – | 7 | – | 0 |
Independents
| Fleet City | | | – | | | 11 | – | 0 | – | 1 |
| Jacksonville NAS | | | – | | | 9 | – | 2 | – | 0 |
| Hutchinson NAS | | | – | | | 8 | – | 0 | – | 0 |
| Selman Field | | | – | | | 8 | – | 1 | – | 0 |
| El Toro Marines | | | – | | | 8 | – | 2 | – | 0 |
| Corpus Christi NAS | | | – | | | 7 | – | 1 | – | 0 |
| North Camp Hood | | | – | | | 7 | – | 1 | – | 0 |
| Little Creek | | | – | | | 7 | – | 2 | – | 0 |
| Santa Barbara Marines | | | – | | | 7 | – | 3 | – | 1 |
| Camp Lee | | | – | | | 7 | – | 4 | – | 0 |
| Camp Beale | | | – | | | 6 | – | 1 | – | 2 |
| Farragut NTS | | | – | | | 6 | – | 2 | – | 0 |
| Eastern Flying Training Command | | | – | | | 6 | – | 3 | – | 1 |
| Great Lakes Navy | | | – | | | 6 | – | 4 | – | 1 |
| Hondo AAF | | | – | | | 6 | – | 4 | – | 1 |
| South Camp Hood | | | – | | | 5 | – | 2 | – | 0 |
| Camp Peary | | | – | | | 5 | – | 3 | – | 0 |
| Bainbridge | | | – | | | 5 | – | 4 | – | 0 |
| Fort Benning | | | – | | | 5 | – | 4 | – | 1 |
| Fort Warren | | | – | | | 5 | – | 7 | – | 0 |
| Fort McClellan | | | – | | | 4 | – | 2 | – | 0 |
| San Diego NTS | | | – | | | 4 | – | 2 | – | 0 |
| Atlantic City NAS | | | – | | | 4 | – | 2 | – | 1 |
| Minter Field | | | – | | | 4 | – | 2 | – | 1 |
| Williams Field | | | – | | | 4 | – | 4 | – | 0 |
| Stockton AAF | | | – | | | 4 | – | 5 | – | 2 |
| Barksdale Field | | | – | | | 4 | – | 7 | – | 0 |
| Fort Pierce | | | – | | | 4 | – | 9 | – | 0 |
| Amarillo AAF | | | – | | | 3 | – | 1 | – | 0 |
| Olathe NAS | | | – | | | 3 | – | 2 | – | 0 |
| Albany Navy | | | – | | | 3 | – | 3 | – | 1 |
| Camp Detrick | | | – | | | 3 | – | 4 | – | 0 |
| Kearney AAF | | | – | | | 3 | – | 4 | – | 0 |
| Bergstrom Field | | | – | | | 3 | – | 5 | – | 1 |
| Keesler Field | | | – | | | 3 | – | 6 | – | 1 |
| Melville PT Boats | | | – | | | 2 | – | 1 | – | 0 |
| Great Bend AAF | | | – | | | 2 | – | 4 | – | 0 |
| Saint Mary's Pre-Flight | | | – | | | 2 | – | 4 | – | 1 |
| Gulfport AAF | | | – | | | 2 | – | 5 | – | 0 |
| Pensacola NAS | | | – | | | 2 | – | 7 | – | 1 |
| Squantum NAS | | | – | | | 1 | – | 1 | – | 0 |
| Camp Blanding | | | – | | | 1 | – | 2 | – | 0 |
| Luke Field | | | – | | | 1 | – | 2 | – | 0 |
| Miami NAS | | | – | | | 1 | – | 2 | – | 0 |
| Miami NTC | | | – | | | 1 | – | 3 | – | 0 |
| NSB New London | | | – | | | 1 | – | 3 | – | 0 |
| Oceana NAS | | | – | | | 1 | – | 3 | – | 0 |
| Fort Riley | | | – | | | 1 | – | 4 | – | 0 |
| Lake Charles AAF | | | – | | | 1 | – | 4 | – | 0 |
| Ellington Field | | | – | | | 1 | – | 4 | – | 1 |
| Cherry Point Marines | | | – | | | 1 | – | 8 | – | 0 |
| Dalhart AAF | | | – | | | 0 | – | 3 | – | 0 |
| Homestead AAB | | | – | | | 0 | – | 3 | – | 0 |
| Fort Monroe | | | – | | | 0 | – | 7 | – | 0 |
+ – Conference co-champions

The 1945 Little Creek Amphibs football team was an American football team that represented United States Navy's Naval Amphibious Base Little Creek in Virginia during the 1945 college football season. Led by head coach Russell L. Waters, the Amphibs compiled a record of 7–2. The team's roster included guard Ben Chase and tackle Phil Ragazzo.

Little Creek ranked 46th among the nation's college and service teams in the final Litkenhous Ratings.

== Schedule ==
| Date | Time | Opponent | Site | Result | Attendance | Source |
|---|---|---|---|---|---|---|
| September 30 | | at Camp Peary | Cary Field; Williamsburg, VA | L 0–6 | 10,000 | |
| October 13 | | Second Army | Forman Field; Norfolk, VA | W 21–0 | 12,000 | |
| October 27 | | Camp Lee | Roberts Field; Little Creek, VA | W 21–7 | 8,000–10,000 | |
| November 3 | | at Navy B team | Annapolis, MD | W 17–14 | | |
| November 11 | 2:00 p.m. | Bainbridge | Forman Field; Norfolk, VA | W 7–0 | 5,000 | |
| November 18 | 2:00 p.m. | Fort Pierce | Foreman Field; Norfolk, VA | W 27–7 | 14,000 | |
| November 24 | 2:00 p.m. | Florida | Forman Field; Norfolk, VA | W 12–0 | 5,000 | |
| December 2 | | at Camp Lee | Nowak Field; Camp Lee, VA | L 6–12 | 13,000–14,000 | |
| December 9 | | at Fort Pierce | Fort Pierce, FL | W 20–0 | 5,000 | |
All times are in Eastern time
