= James Ogilvie (coach) =

American surgeon and athlete

Biographical details
- Born: c. 1866; England
- Died: July 12, 1950; Amesbury, Massachusetts, U.S.

Playing career
- 1891–1894: Williams
- Position: Guard

Coaching career (HC unless noted)
- 1899: NYU

Head coaching record
- Overall: 2–6

James Ogilvie (c. 1866 – July 12, 1950) was an American college football player and coach and physician and surgeon. He was the third head football coach at New York University (NYU), serving for one season, in 1899, and eading the NYU Violets to a record of 2–6. One of the two wins for his team was a 6–5 victory over Rutgers In at least two other games, against Hamilton and Columbia, the team produced what were considered to be poor performances. Ogilvie was referred to at least one time as "Dr. Ogilvie" and had previously played as a guard at Williams College from 1891 to 1894, a member of the class of 1895. He also attended Columbia University, where he received his M. D.

== Head coaching record ==
| Year | Team | Overall | Conference | Standing | Bowl/playoffs |
|---|---|---|---|---|---|
NYU Violets (Independent) (1899)
| 1899 | NYU | 2–6 | | | |
| NYU: | | 2–6 | | | |
| Total: | | 2–6 | | | |
