= 1947 NYU Violets football team =

American college football season

1947 NYU Violets football
- Conference: Independent
- Record: 2–5–1
- Head coach: Edward Mylin (1st season)
- Home stadium: Polo Grounds; Yankee Stadium

1947 Eastern major college football independents records
| | Conf. | | | Overall |
| Team | W | L | T | W | | L | | T |
|---|---|---|---|---|---|---|---|---|
| No. 4 Penn State | | – | | 9 | – | 0 | – | 1 |
| No. 11 Army | | – | | 5 | – | 2 | – | 2 |
| Villanova | | – | | 6 | – | 3 | – | 1 |
| Boston University | | – | | 5 | – | 3 | – | 0 |
| Boston College | | – | | 5 | – | 4 | – | 0 |
| Holy Cross | | – | | 4 | – | 4 | – | 2 |
| Syracuse | | – | | 3 | – | 6 | – | 0 |
| Temple | | – | | 3 | – | 6 | – | 0 |
| NYU | | – | | 2 | – | 5 | – | 1 |
| Colgate | | – | | 1 | – | 5 | – | 2 |
| Duquesne | | – | | 2 | – | 8 | – | 0 |
| Fordham | | – | | 1 | – | 6 | – | 1 |
| Merchant Marine | | – | | 2 | – | 9 | – | 0 |
| Pittsburgh | | – | | 1 | – | 8 | – | 0 |
Rankings from AP Poll

The 1947 NYU Violets football team was an American football team that represented New York University (NYU) as an independent during the 1947 college football season. In its first season under head coach Edward Mylin, the team compiled a 2–5–1 record and was outscored by a total of 194 to 65.

Mylin, commonly known as "Hooks" Mylin, was hired as NYU's head football coach in February 1947. He came to NYU after seven years as head coach at Lafayette and three years of military service during World War II. Mylin was later inducted into the College Football Hall of Fame.

In the final Litkenhous Ratings released in mid-December, NYU was ranked at No. 286 out of 500 college football teams.

The team played its home games at the Polo Grounds in Upper Manhattan and Yankee Stadium in The Bronx.

== Schedule ==
| Date | Opponent | Site | Result | Attendance | Source |
|---|---|---|---|---|---|
| September 27 | at Temple | Temple Stadium; Philadelphia, PA | L 7–32 | 18,000 | |
| October 4 | Brooklyn | Polo Grounds; New York, NY | W 19–0 | 15,000 | |
| October 11 | at Boston University | Fenway Park; Boston, MA | L 7–38 | 7,000 | |
| October 18 | West Virginia | Yankee Stadium; Bronx, NY | L 0–40 | 8,000 | |
| October 24 | at Georgetown | Griffith Stadium; Washington, SC | L 0–25 | 9,564 | |
| November 11 | Bucknell | Yankee Stadium; Bronx, NY | W 19–6 | 5,000 | |
| November 15 | at Rutgers | Rutgers Stadium; Piscataway, NJ | L 0–40 | 14,000 | |
| November 29 | vs. Fordham | Polo Grounds; New York, NY | T 13–13 | 27,000 | |

== Personnel ==
=== Players ===
- Harvey Anton - guard
- August Autieri - end, No. 20, 5'10", 165 pounds
- Joe Bonacorsa - back, 5'10", 182 pounds
- Joe Brescia - halfback
- Fred Burgess - back
- Arthur Cherico - tackle, No. 49, 5'11", 207 pounds
- Jim Confrancisco - guard, No. 50, 5'8", 220 pounds
- Al De Maria - guard
- George Diehl, back, 5'10", 170 pounds
- Al Donofrio - back
- Bill Eckert - center, No. 42, 6'1", 216 pounds
- Walter Edbril - fullback
- Howard Eisenmann - end
- Jerry Eisenmann - back, No. 12, 5'11", 175 pounds
- Mike Fazio - tackle
- Ben Fleischer - end
- Dante Gionta - tackle, No. 40, 6'0", 210 pounds
- Bill Kaufman - center
- Tom Kavazanjian - back, No. 11, 5'9", 180 pounds
- Sy Kuppersmith - back, No. 36, 5'11", 201 pounds
- George Lorenta - tackle
- Ottavio Marcolina - tackle, No. 39, 6'2", 237 pounds
- Martin Martinsen - center, No. 43, 6'0", 200 pounds
- Robert Matz, back, 5'7", 160 pounds
- Dave Millman - back, No. 26, 5'11", 200 pounds
- Irving Mondschein - end, No. 21, 6'0", 201 pounds
- Joe Novotny - back, No. 10, 5'9", 177 pounds
- Angelo Plaia - tackle, No. 41, 5'11", 240 pounds
- Morton Richman - quarterback
- Joe Sarno - end, No. 28, 5'11", 182 pounds
- Bob Scolpino - guard, No. 25, 5'8", 195 pounds
- George E. Starke, end, No. 44, 6'4", 215 pounds
- Frank Sukana - guard, No. 19, 5'11", 185 pounds
- Harry Torgerson - tackle
- John Vergari - back, No. 15, 5'8", 172 pounds
- Ray Verolini - guard, No. 18, 5'10", 185 pounds
- Larry Weinstein - end, No. 22, 6'1", 178 pounds
- Mike Yaremko - back, No. 27, 5'9", 190 pounds
- August Ziegler - center

=== Coaches ===
- Edward Mylin, head coach
- Woodrow Wolf, assistant coach
- Ralph Furiel, freshman coach
- Albert Nixon, graduate manager
