= 1942 Lafayette Leopards football team =

American football club

1942 Lafayette Leopards football

Middle Three co-champion
- Conference: Middle Three Conference
- Record: 3–5–1 (1–0–1 Middle Three)
- Head coach: Edward Mylin (6th season)
- Captain: Charles Nagle
- Home stadium: Fisher Field

1942 Middle Three Conference football standings
	Conf.					Overall
Team	W		L		T	W		L		T
Lehigh +	1	–	0	–	1	5	–	2	–	1
Lafayette +	1	–	0	–	1	3	–	5	–	1
Rutgers	0	–	2	–	0	3	–	4	–	1
$ – Conference champion

The 1942 Lafayette Leopards football team was an American football team that represented Lafayette College in the Middle Three Conference during the 1942 college football season. In its sixth season under head coach Edward Mylin, the team compiled a 3–5–1 record. Charles Nagle was the team captain. The team played home games at Fisher Field in Easton, Pennsylvania.

Lafayette was ranked at No. 139 (out of 590 college and military teams) in the final rankings under the Litkenhous Difference by Score System for 1942.

== Schedule ==
Date	Opponent	Site	Result	Attendance	Source
September 26	at Cornell*	Schoellkopf Field; Ithaca, NY	L 16–20		
October 3	at Army*	Michie Stadium; West Point, NY	L 0–14		
October 10	Fort Monmouth*	Fisher Field; Easton, PA	W 7–3		
October 17	at Brown*	Andrews Field; Providence, RI	L 0–7		
October 24	Virginia*	Fisher Field; Easton, PA	W 19–13	8,000	
October 31	at Bucknell*	Memorial StadiumLewisburg, PA	L 7–13	7,000	
November 7	at Rutgers	Rutgers Stadium; Piscataway, NJ	W 19–14		
November 14	Lakehurst NAS*	Fisher Field; Easton, PA	L 0–14		
November 21	Lehigh	Fisher Field; Easton, PA (rivalry)	T 7–7		
*Non-conference game
