= 1945 Second Air Force Superbombers football team =

American college football season

1945 Second Air Force Superbombers football
- Conference: Army Air Forces League
- Record: 3–7 (1–5 AAF League)
- Head coach: Ed Walker (1st season)
- Home stadium: Penrose Stadium

1945 military service football records
	Conf.					Overall
Team	W		L		T	W		L		T
Army Air Forces League
Third Air Force +	4	–	1	–	1	7	–	2	–	1
AAF Training Command +	4	–	1	–	1	8	–	3	–	1
Fourth Air Force	3	–	2	–	1	6	–	3	–	1
First Air Force	2	–	2	–	2	3	–	2	–	3
Air Transport Command	2	–	3	–	1	6	–	3	–	2
Personnel Distribution Command	2	–	4	–	0	6	–	5	–	0
Second Air Force	1	–	5	–	0	3	–	7	–	0
Independents
Fleet City			–			11	–	0	–	1
Jacksonville NAS			–			9	–	2	–	0
Hutchinson NAS			–			8	–	0	–	0
Selman Field			–			8	–	1	–	0
El Toro Marines			–			8	–	2	–	0
Corpus Christi NAS			–			7	–	1	–	0
North Camp Hood			–			7	–	1	–	0
Little Creek			–			7	–	2	–	0
Santa Barbara Marines			–			7	–	3	–	1
Camp Lee			–			7	–	4	–	0
Camp Beale			–			6	–	1	–	2
Farragut NTS			–			6	–	2	–	0
Eastern Flying Training Command			–			6	–	3	–	1
Great Lakes Navy			–			6	–	4	–	1
Hondo AAF			–			6	–	4	–	1
South Camp Hood			–			5	–	2	–	0
Camp Peary			–			5	–	3	–	0
Bainbridge			–			5	–	4	–	0
Fort Benning			–			5	–	4	–	1
Fort Warren			–			5	–	7	–	0
Fort McClellan			–			4	–	2	–	0
San Diego NTS			–			4	–	2	–	0
Atlantic City NAS			–			4	–	2	–	1
Minter Field			–			4	–	2	–	1
Williams Field			–			4	–	4	–	0
Stockton AAF			–			4	–	5	–	2
Barksdale Field			–			4	–	7	–	0
Fort Pierce			–			4	–	9	–	0
Amarillo AAF			–			3	–	1	–	0
Olathe NAS			–			3	–	2	–	0
Albany Navy			–			3	–	3	–	1
Camp Detrick			–			3	–	4	–	0
Kearney AAF			–			3	–	4	–	0
Bergstrom Field			–			3	–	5	–	1
Keesler Field			–			3	–	6	–	1
Melville PT Boats			–			2	–	1	–	0
Great Bend AAF			–			2	–	4	–	0
Saint Mary's Pre-Flight			–			2	–	4	–	1
Gulfport AAF			–			2	–	5	–	0
Pensacola NAS			–			2	–	7	–	1
Squantum NAS			–			1	–	1	–	0
Camp Blanding			–			1	–	2	–	0
Luke Field			–			1	–	2	–	0
Miami NAS			–			1	–	2	–	0
Miami NTC			–			1	–	3	–	0
NSB New London			–			1	–	3	–	0
Oceana NAS			–			1	–	3	–	0
Fort Riley			–			1	–	4	–	0
Lake Charles AAF			–			1	–	4	–	0
Ellington Field			–			1	–	4	–	1
Cherry Point Marines			–			1	–	8	–	0
Dalhart AAF			–			0	–	3	–	0
Homestead AAB			–			0	–	3	–	0
Fort Monroe			–			0	–	7	–	0
+ – Conference co-champions

The 1945 Second Air Force Superbombers football team represented the Second Air Force based in Colorado Springs, Colorado during the 1945 college football season. The Superbombers competed in the Army Air Forces League (AAF League) with six others teams from the United States Army Air Forces. Led by head coach Ed Walker, the Superbombers compiled an overall record of 3–7 with a mark of 1–5 in league play, placing last out of seven teams in the AAF League.

The Second Air Force Superbombers were ranked 33rd among the nation's college and service teams in the final Litkenhous Ratings.

== Schedule ==
Date	Time	Opponent	Site	Result	Attendance	Source
September 14	9:30 p.m.	at Fourth Air Force	Los Angeles Memorial Coliseum; Los Angeles, CA	L 14–17	61,650	
September 23	2:30 p.m.	at Fleet City*	Kezar Stadium; San Francisco, CA	L 0–7	62,000	
September 30		vs. Fort Warren*	DU Stadium; Denver, CO	W 19–0	6,000–7,000	
October 7		vs. Keesler Field*	Howard Wood Field; Sioux Falls, SD	W 28–13	7,000	
October 14		El Toro Marines*	Penrose Stadium; Colorado Springs, CO	L 9–20	10,000	
October 21		vs. Personnel Distribution Command	University Stadium; Albuquerque, NM	W 13–0	8,000	
November 4		vs. Third Air Force	DU Stadium; Denver, CO	L 0–33	15,000	
November 11	1:00 p.m.	vs. Air Transport Command	Memorial Stadium; Lincoln, NE	L 0–15	15,000	
November 18		at First Air Force	Freeport Municipal Stadium; Freeport, NY	L 0–15	4,000	
December 2		at Army Air Forces Training Command	Farrington Field; Fort Worth, TX	L 7–37	30,000	
*Non-conference game; All times are in Mountain time
