= 1945 Eastern Flying Training Command Eagles football team =

American college football season

1945 Eastern Flying Training Command Eagles football
- Conference: Independent
- Record: 6–3–1
- Head coach: Paul Geisler (1st season)
- Home stadium: Cramton Bowl

1945 military service football records
	Conf.					Overall
Team	W		L		T	W		L		T
Army Air Forces League
Third Air Force +	4	–	1	–	1	7	–	2	–	1
AAF Training Command +	4	–	1	–	1	8	–	3	–	1
Fourth Air Force	3	–	2	–	1	6	–	3	–	1
First Air Force	2	–	2	–	2	3	–	2	–	3
Air Transport Command	2	–	3	–	1	6	–	3	–	2
Personnel Distribution Command	2	–	4	–	0	6	–	5	–	0
Second Air Force	1	–	5	–	0	3	–	7	–	0
Independents
Fleet City			–			11	–	0	–	1
Jacksonville NAS			–			9	–	2	–	0
Hutchinson NAS			–			8	–	0	–	0
Selman Field			–			8	–	1	–	0
El Toro Marines			–			8	–	2	–	0
Corpus Christi NAS			–			7	–	1	–	0
North Camp Hood			–			7	–	1	–	0
Little Creek			–			7	–	2	–	0
Santa Barbara Marines			–			7	–	3	–	1
Camp Lee			–			7	–	4	–	0
Camp Beale			–			6	–	1	–	2
Farragut NTS			–			6	–	2	–	0
Eastern Flying Training Command			–			6	–	3	–	1
Great Lakes Navy			–			6	–	4	–	1
Hondo AAF			–			6	–	4	–	1
South Camp Hood			–			5	–	2	–	0
Camp Peary			–			5	–	3	–	0
Bainbridge			–			5	–	4	–	0
Fort Benning			–			5	–	4	–	1
Fort Warren			–			5	–	7	–	0
Fort McClellan			–			4	–	2	–	0
San Diego NTS			–			4	–	2	–	0
Atlantic City NAS			–			4	–	2	–	1
Minter Field			–			4	–	2	–	1
Williams Field			–			4	–	4	–	0
Stockton AAF			–			4	–	5	–	2
Barksdale Field			–			4	–	7	–	0
Fort Pierce			–			4	–	9	–	0
Amarillo AAF			–			3	–	1	–	0
Olathe NAS			–			3	–	2	–	0
Albany Navy			–			3	–	3	–	1
Camp Detrick			–			3	–	4	–	0
Kearney AAF			–			3	–	4	–	0
Bergstrom Field			–			3	–	5	–	1
Keesler Field			–			3	–	6	–	1
Melville PT Boats			–			2	–	1	–	0
Great Bend AAF			–			2	–	4	–	0
Saint Mary's Pre-Flight			–			2	–	4	–	1
Gulfport AAF			–			2	–	5	–	0
Pensacola NAS			–			2	–	7	–	1
Squantum NAS			–			1	–	1	–	0
Camp Blanding			–			1	–	2	–	0
Luke Field			–			1	–	2	–	0
Miami NAS			–			1	–	2	–	0
Miami NTC			–			1	–	3	–	0
NSB New London			–			1	–	3	–	0
Oceana NAS			–			1	–	3	–	0
Fort Riley			–			1	–	4	–	0
Lake Charles AAF			–			1	–	4	–	0
Ellington Field			–			1	–	4	–	1
Cherry Point Marines			–			1	–	8	–	0
Dalhart AAF			–			0	–	3	–	0
Homestead AAB			–			0	–	3	–	0
Fort Monroe			–			0	–	7	–	0
+ – Conference co-champions

The 1945 Eastern Flying Training Command Eagles team represented the Army Air Forces Eastern Flying Training Command (ETFC) at Maxwell Field in Montgomery, Alabama during the 1945 college football season. Led by head coach Paul Geisler, the Eagles compiled a record of 6–3–1.

Eastern Flying Training Command was ranked 60th among the nation's college and service teams in the final Litkenhous Ratings.

== Schedule ==
Date	Time	Opponent	Site	Result	Attendance	Source
September 15	8:00 p.m.	at Barksdale Field	Louisiana State Fair Grounds; Shreveport, LA	W 13–0	10,000	
September 23	2:30 p.m.	Gulfport AAF	Cramton Bowl; Montgomery, AL	W 40–0	6,000	
September 28	8:00 p.m.	vs. Auburn	Cramton Bowl; Montgomery, AL	W 7–0	12,000	
October 5		at Army JV	West Point, NY	W 7–6		
October 13		Homestead AAB	Montgomery, AL	cancelled		
October 20		at No. 20 Mississippi State	Scott Field; Starkville, MS	L 6–16	5,000	
November 4		Pensacola NAS	Cramton Bowl; Montgomery, AL	W 19–6	4,000	
November 11		Barksdale Field	Cramton Bowl; Montgomery, AL	W 29–0	5,000	
November 18		at Keesler Field	Flier Field; Biloxi, MS	L 14–7	12,000	
November 25	2:30 p.m.	at AAF Training Command	Farrington Field; Fort Worth, TX	L 7–45	7,000	
December 8		at Pensacola NAS	Air Station Field; Pensacola, FL	T 7–7	8,000	
Rankings from AP Poll released prior to the game; All times are in Central time
