= 1899 NYU Violets football team =

American college football season

1899 NYU Violets football
- Conference: Independent
- Record: 2–6
- Head coach: James Ogilvie (1st season)

1899 Eastern college football independents records
	Conf.			Overall
Team	W	L	T	W		L		T
Harvard		–		10	–	0	–	1
Lafayette		–		12	–	1	–	0
Princeton		–		12	–	1	–	0
Buffalo		–		7	–	1	–	0
Boston College		–		8	–	1	–	1
Carlisle		–		9	–	2	–	0
Swarthmore		–		8	–	1	–	2
Washington & Jefferson		–		9	–	2	–	1
Wesleyan		–		7	–	2	–	0
Pittsburgh College		–		2	–	0	–	2
Villanova		–		7	–	2	–	1
Yale		–		7	–	2	–	1
Western Univ. of Penn.		–		3	–	1	–	1
Columbia		–		9	–	3	–	0
Fordham		–		3	–	1	–	0
Cornell		–		7	–	3	–	0
Penn		–		8	–	3	–	2
Brown		–		7	–	3	–	1
New Hampshire		–		4	–	2	–	0
Vermont		–		5	–	3	–	0
Tufts		–		7	–	4	–	0
Bucknell		–		6	–	4	–	0
Dickinson		–		6	–	6	–	1
Holy Cross		–		5	–	5	–	0
Syracuse		–		4	–	4	–	0
Drexel		–		3	–	3	–	0
Army		–		4	–	5	–	0
Colgate		–		4	–	5	–	0
Penn State		–		4	–	6	–	1
Franklin & Marshall		–		3	–	5	–	1
NYU		–		2	–	6	–	0
Temple		–		1	–	4	–	1
Dartmouth		–		2	–	7	–	0
Lehigh		–		2	–	9	–	0
Rutgers		–		2	–	9	–	0
Geneva		–		0	–	3	–	0

The 1899 NYU Violets football team was an American football team that represented New York University as an independent during the 1899 college football season. In their only year under head coach James Ogilvie, the team compiled a 2–6 record.

== Schedule ==
Date	Opponent	Site	Result	Source
October 14	at Syracuse	Syracuse, NY	L 5–10	
October 18	at Columbia	Manhattan Field; New York, NY	L 0–40	
October 21	at Hamilton	Genesee Park; Utica, NY	L 0–35	
October 28	at Lehigh	Bethlehem, PA	L 0–50	
November 4	at Trinity (CT)	Trinity Field; Hartford, CT	L 0–28	
November 11	at Rutgers	Neilson Field; New Brunswick, NJ	W 6–5	
November 18	Stevens	Berkeley Oval; New York, NY	W 18–6	
November 25	Hamilton	Berkeley Oval; New York, NY	L 0–17	
