= 1943 Rutgers Queensmen football team =

American college football season

1943 Rutgers Queensmen football
- Conference: Middle Three Conference
- Record: 3–2 (3–1 Middle Three)
- Head coach: Harry Rockafeller (6th season)
- Captain: Robert S. Goldberger
- Home stadium: Rutgers Stadium

1943 Middle Three Conference football standings
| | Conf. | | | | | Overall |
| Team | W | | L | | T | W | | L | | T |
|---|---|---|---|---|---|---|---|---|---|---|
| Lafayette + | 3 | – | 1 | – | 0 | 4 | – | 1 | – | 0 |
| Rutgers + | 3 | – | 1 | – | 0 | 3 | – | 2 | – | 0 |
| Lehigh | 0 | – | 4 | – | 0 | 0 | – | 5 | – | 1 |
+ – Conference co-champions

The 1943 Rutgers Queensmen football team was an American football team that represented Rutgers University as a member of the Middle Three Conference during the 1943 college football season. In their sixth season under head coach Harry Rockafeller, the Queensmen compiled a 3–2 record, were co-champions of the Middle Three, and outscored their opponents 61 to 21. The team defeated Lehigh twice and split a pair of games against Lafayette.

In the final Litkenhous Ratings, Rutgers ranked 174th among the nation's college and service teams with a rating of 48.2.

== Schedule ==
| Date | Opponent | Site | Result | Attendance | Source |
|---|---|---|---|---|---|
| October 30 | Lehigh | Rutgers Stadium; Piscataway, NJ | W 26–6 | 2,500 | |
| November 6 | Lafayette | Rutgers Stadium; Piscataway, NJ | W 13–0 | 4,000 | |
| November 13 | at Lehigh | Taylor Stadium; Bethlehem, PA | W 20–0 | | |
| November 20 | at Lafayette | Fisher Field; Easton, PA | L 2–9 | 7,000 | |
| November 26 | Brooklyn* | Rutgers Stadium; Piscataway, NJ | L 6–12 | | |
*Non-conference game
