= 1938 Rutgers Queensmen football team =

American college football season

1938 Rutgers Queensmen football

Middle Three champion
- Conference: Middle Three Conference
- Record: 7–1 (2–0 Middle Three)
- Head coach: Harvey Harman (1st season)
- Captain: Paul Harvey
- Home stadium: Neilson Field, Rutgers Stadium

1938 Middle Three Conference football standings
	Conf.					Overall
Team	W		L		T	W		L		T
Rutgers $	2	–	0	–	0	7	–	1	–	0
Lafayette	1	–	1	–	0	5	–	3	–	0
Lehigh	0	–	2	–	0	2	–	5	–	2
$ – Conference champion

The 1938 Rutgers Queensmen football team represented Rutgers University in the 1938 college football season. In February 1938, Rutgers announced Tasker's resignation as Rutgers' football coach and his replacement by Harvey Harman. In their first season under coach Harman, the Queensmen compiled a 7–1 record, won the Middle Three Conference championship, and outscored their opponents 118 to 57. Rutgers only loss was to NYU by a 25-6 score.

On November 5, 1938, Rutgers played its first game at the new Rutgers Stadium, built at a cost of $1 million. Playing in front of a crowd of 22,500, Rutgers won the game, 20-18, against Princeton, marking the first time Rutgers had defeated a Princeton team since the two schools played the first college football game in 1869.

In the final game of the 1938 season, Rutgers defeated Lafayette to win the Middle Three championship.

== Schedule ==
Date	Opponent	Site	Result	Attendance	Source
September 24	Marietta	Neilson Field; New Brunswick, NJ	W 20–0	6,000	
October 1	Vermont	Neilson Field; New Brunswick, NJ	W 15–14	7,000	
October 8	NYU	Neilson Field; New Brunswick, NJ	L 6–25	12,000	
October 15	Springfield	Neilson Field; New Brunswick, NJ	W 6–0		
October 21	Hampden–Sydney	Neilson Field; New Brunswick, NJ	W 32–0	12,000	
October 29	at Lehigh	Taylor Stadium; Bethlehem, PA	W 13–0	9,000	
November 5	Princeton	Rutgers Stadium; Piscataway, NJ (rivalry)	W 20–18	22,500	
November 12	Lafayette	Rutgers Stadium; Piscataway, NJ	W 6–0		
