= Charles L. Taylor =

American industrialist

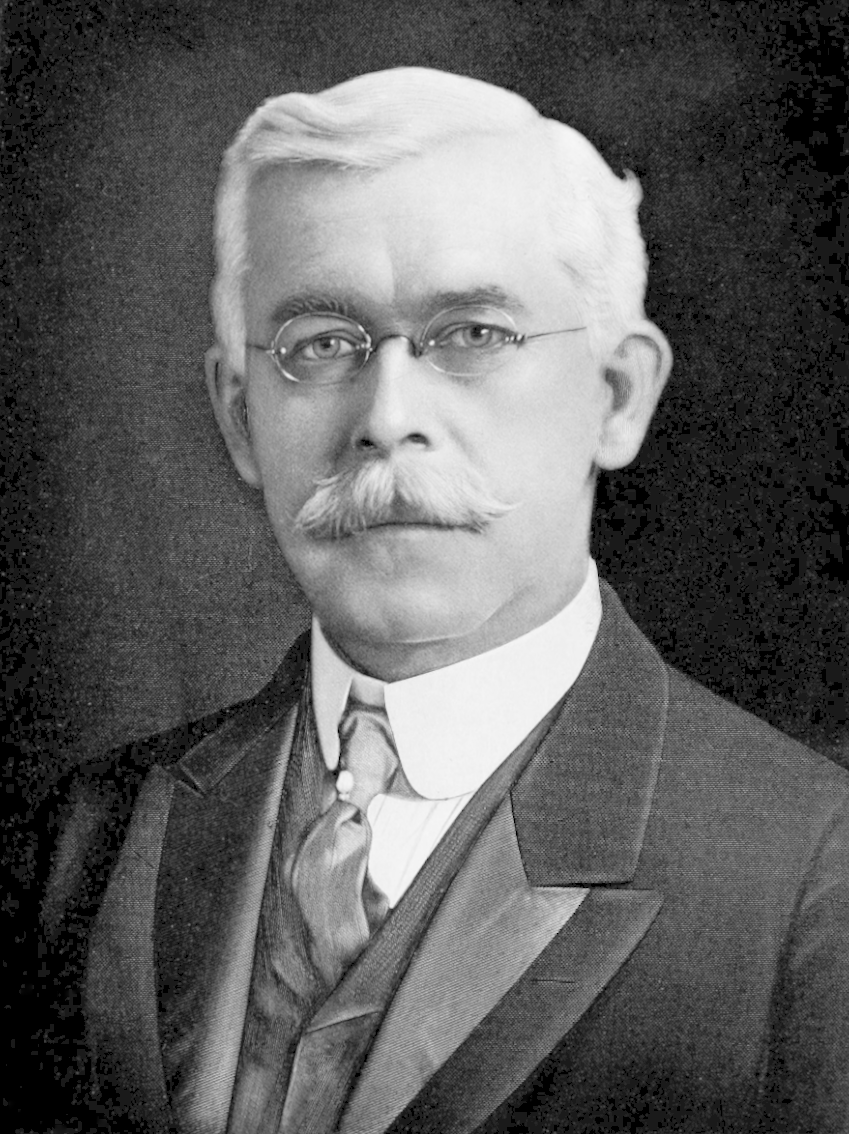
- Born: Charles Lewis Taylor; April 3, 1857; Philadelphia, Pennsylvania
- Died: February 3, 1922 (aged 64); Santa Barbara, California
- Burial place: Homewood Cemetery
- Education: Lehigh University
- Occupation: Industrialist
- Spouse: Lillian Pitcairn (m. 1883)
- Children: 1

Signature
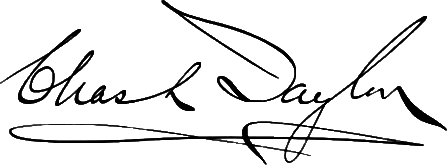

Charles Lewis Taylor (April 3, 1857 – February 3, 1922) was an American industrialist.

== Biography ==
Charles L. Taylor was born in Philadelphia on April 3, 1857. He graduated from Lehigh University in 1876. He married Lillian Pitcairn on October 31, 1883, and they had one daughter.

Taylor first went to work as an assistant chemist for the Cambria Iron Company in Johnstown, Pennsylvania. From there he moved to Pittsburgh where he was the Superintendent of the Homestead Steel Works. It was when he became General Manager of The Hartman Steel Company that Taylor first began to work for Andrew Carnegie.

Taylor died at his winter home in Santa Barbara, California on February 3, 1922, and was buried at Homewood Cemetery in Pittsburgh.

Taylor College, a dormitory for upperclass students at Lehigh University, is named in his honor. Lehigh's Taylor Stadium and Taylor Gymnasium were also named after him.
