= 1945 Rutgers Queensmen football team =

American college football season

1945 Rutgers Queensmen football

Middle Three champion
- Conference: Middle Three Conference
- Record: 5–2 (2–0 Middle Three)
- Head coach: Harry Rockafeller (8th season)
- Captain: Eugene McManus
- Home stadium: Rutgers Stadium

1945 Middle Three Conference football standings
	Conf.					Overall
Team	W		L		T	W		L		T
Rutgers $	2	–	0	–	0	5	–	2	–	0
Lafayette	1	–	1	–	0	1	–	7	–	1
Lehigh	0	–	2	–	0	2	–	4	–	0
$ – Conference champion

The 1945 Rutgers Queensmen football team represented Rutgers University in the 1945 college football season. In their eighth and final season under head coach Harry Rockafeller, the Queensmen compiled a 5–2 record, won the Middle Three Conference championship, and outscored their opponents 140–61. The team's only losses came against Swarthmore (13–6) and Princeton (14–6). In November 1945, Rockafeller announced that he would step down as head coach at the end of the 1945 season.

== Schedule ==
Date	Opponent	Site	Result	Attendance	Source
October 6	Swarthmore*	Rutgers Stadium; Piscataway, NJ	L 6–13	2,000	
October 13	at Muhlenberg*	Scotty Wood Stadium; Allentown, PA	W 10–6	1,000	
October 20	Rhode Island State*	Rutgers Stadium; Piscataway, NJ	W 39–7	5,000	
October 27	at Princeton*	Palmer Stadium; Princeton, NJ (rivalry)	L 6–14	12,000	
November 3	Lehigh	Rutgers Stadium; Piscataway, NJ	W 25–0	5,500	
November 10	at Lafayette	Fisher Field; Easton, PA	W 32–14	2,500	
November 17	NYU*	Rutgers Stadium; Piscataway, NJ	W 13–7	10,000	
*Non-conference game
