= 1898 Rutgers Queensmen football team =

American college football season

1898 Rutgers Queensmen football
- Conference: Independent
- Record: 1–6–1
- Head coach: William V. B. Van Dyck (1st season)
- Captain: William F. McMahon
- Home stadium: Neilson Field

1898 Eastern college football independents records
| | Conf. | | | Overall |
| Team | W | L | T | W | | L | | T |
|---|---|---|---|---|---|---|---|---|
| Harvard | | – | | 11 | – | 0 | – | 0 |
| Drexel | | – | | 7 | – | 0 | – | 0 |
| Princeton | | – | | 11 | – | 0 | – | 1 |
| Penn | | – | | 12 | – | 1 | – | 0 |
| Buffalo | | – | | 8 | – | 1 | – | 0 |
| Cornell | | – | | 10 | – | 2 | – | 0 |
| Swarthmore | | – | | 9 | – | 2 | – | 0 |
| Washington & Jefferson | | – | | 9 | – | 2 | – | 0 |
| Yale | | – | | 9 | – | 2 | – | 0 |
| Dickinson | | – | | 8 | – | 2 | – | 0 |
| Syracuse | | – | | 8 | – | 2 | – | 1 |
| Wesleyan | | – | | 7 | – | 3 | – | 0 |
| Western Penn. | | – | | 5 | – | 2 | – | 1 |
| Brown | | – | | 6 | – | 4 | – | 0 |
| Carlisle | | – | | 6 | – | 4 | – | 0 |
| Penn State | | – | | 6 | – | 4 | – | 0 |
| Pittsburgh College | | – | | 6 | – | 4 | – | 1 |
| Army | | – | | 3 | – | 2 | – | 1 |
| Vermont | | – | | 3 | – | 2 | – | 1 |
| Holy Cross | | – | | 5 | – | 4 | – | 1 |
| Bucknell | | – | | 4 | – | 4 | – | 3 |
| Fordham | | – | | 1 | – | 1 | – | 2 |
| Franklin & Marshall | | – | | 4 | – | 4 | – | 2 |
| New Hampshire | | – | | 4 | – | 4 | – | 0 |
| Amherst | | – | | 4 | – | 5 | – | 1 |
| Villanova | | – | | 2 | – | 4 | – | 1 |
| Lehigh | | – | | 3 | – | 6 | – | 1 |
| Boston College | | – | | 2 | – | 5 | – | 1 |
| Colgate | | – | | 2 | – | 5 | – | 1 |
| Temple | | – | | 2 | – | 5 | – | 0 |
| Lafayette | | – | | 3 | – | 8 | – | 0 |
| NYU | | – | | 1 | – | 3 | – | 0 |
| Rutgers | | – | | 1 | – | 6 | – | 1 |
| Tufts | | – | | 1 | – | 9 | – | 0 |
| Geneva | | – | | 0 | – | 6 | – | 1 |

The 1898 Rutgers Queensmen football team represented Rutgers University as an independent during the 1898 college football season. In their first season under head coach William V. B. Van Dyck, the Queensmen compiled a 1–6–1 record and were outscored by their opponents, 114 to 16. The team captain was William F. McMahon.

== Schedule ==
| Date | Time | Opponent | Site | Result | Source |
|---|---|---|---|---|---|
| September 28 | | at Lehigh | Bethlehem, PA | L 0–12 | |
| October 8 | | at Swarthmore | Swarthmore, PA | L 0–6 | |
| October 12 | | at Stevens | St. George Cricket Club; Hoboken, NJ | L 0–1 (forfeit) | |
| October 15 | | at NYU | Ohio Field; Bronx, NY | W 11–5 | |
| October 22 | | Haverford | Neilson Field; New Brunswick, NJ | T 0–0 | |
| October 29 | | at Union (NY) | Schenectady, NY | L 0–17 | |
| November 5 | | Stevens | Neilson Field; New Brunswick, NJ | L 0–5 | |
| November 12 | 3:00 p.m. | at Wesleyan | Andrus Field; Middletown, CT | L 0–59 | |
