= Edgar Cherry =

American football player (1914–1985)

Profile
- Position: Fullback

Personal information
- Born: June 16, 1914; Wellington, Texas, U.S.
- Died: November 11, 1985 (aged 71)
- Listed height: 6 ft 0 in (1.83 m)
- Listed weight: 208 lb (94 kg)

Career information
- High school: Shamrock (Shamrock, Texas)
- College: Hardin–Simmons
- NFL draft: 1938: 7th round, 55th overall pick

Career history
- Chicago Cardinals (1938); Pittsburgh Pirates (1939); Chicago Cardinals (1939)

Career NFL statistics
- Games played: 8
- Games started: 1
- Rushing yards: 48
- Rush attempts: 16
- Stats at Pro Football Reference

Edgar Franklin Cherry (June 16, 1914 – November 11, 1985) was an American professional football fullback who played two seasons for two different teams, the Pittsburgh Pirates and the Chicago Cardinals of the National Football League (NFL). He was selected by the Chicago Cardinals in the seventh round of the 1938 NFL draft. He played college football at Hardin–Simmons University.
