= Arthur P. Robinson =

American football coach and businessman

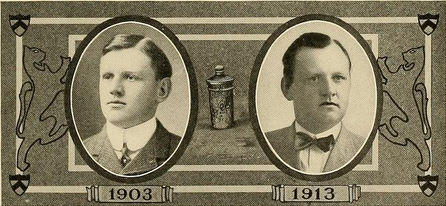
- Robinson in 1903 and 1913

Biographical details
- Born: February 23, 1879; Lapeer, New York, U.S.
- Died: September 30, 1944 (aged 65); Plainfield, New Jersey, U.S.

Coaching career (HC unless noted)
- 1901: Rutgers

Head coaching record
- Overall: 0–7

Arthur Pierce Robinson (February 23, 1879 – September 30, 1944) was an American football coach and businessman. He was the head coach of the Rutgers Scarlet Knights football team during the 1901 college football season. He later worked for more than 24 years for the Ransome Concrete Machinery Company of Dunellen, New Jersey.

== Early years ==
Robinson was born in 1879 in Lapeer Township, Cortland County, New York. He attended Princeton University, where he graduated with honors with a civil engineering degree in 1903.

== Football coach at Rutgers ==
While studying at Princeton, Robinson, at age 21, served as the head football coach at nearby Rutgers College in 1901. He compiled a record of 0–7 during his one season as the team's head coach.

== Business career and family ==
After graduating from Princeton, Robinson worked for the Pennsylvania Railroad for a year-and-a-half. He next operated a contracting business of his own until January 1907. In February 1907, he moved to Birmingham, Alabama in the employ of a northern contracting firm. In June 1907, he was married to Mary Louise Wallace. They had three children: Ellen Emeline (born 1908), John Wallace (born 1909), and Mary.

In October 1909, he became employed by the W. E. Austin Machinery Co. in Atlanta. By August 1913, he had been promoted to vice president. He was responsible for overseeing projects throughout the south and in Cuba.

Robinson next worked for more than 24 years for the Ransome Concrete Machinery Company of Dunellen, New Jersey, eventually retiring as the company's vice president and sales manager. In 1918, Robinson was living in Plainfield, New Jersey, with his wife Mary, and working as the sales manager for the Ransome Concrete Machinery Company. At the time of the 1920 United States Census, he was living in Plainfield with his wife Mary and three children: Ellen, John and Mary. At the time of the 1930 and 1940 Censuses, he remained in Plainfield with his wife Mary. In 1942, Robinson was still living in Plainfield and working for the Ransome Concrete Machinery Co.

Robinson died in September 1944 at Muhlenberg Hospital in Plainfield at age 66. He was survived by his wife Mary Louise Wallace Robinson, two daughters, and a son.

== Head coaching record ==
Year	Team	Overall	Conference	Standing	Bowl/playoffs
Rutgers Queensmen (Independent) (1901)
1901	Rutgers	0–7			
Rutgers:		0–7			
Total:		0–7			
