= William V. B. Van Dyck =

American football player and coach, electrical engineer and businessman

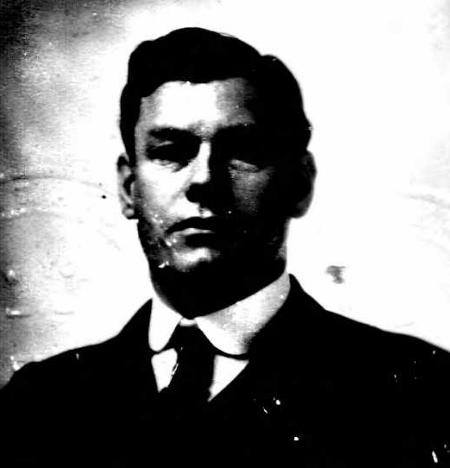
- Van Dyck from 1916 passport application

Biographical details
- Born: September 8, 1875; New Brunswick, New Jersey, U.S.
- Died: March 13, 1981 (aged 105); Schenectady, New York, U.S.

Playing career

Football
- 1893–1894: Rutgers

Baseball
- 1893–1894: Rutgers
- Positions: Fullback (football); Second baseman (baseball)

Coaching career (HC unless noted)

Football
- 1898–1899: Rutgers

Head coaching record
- Overall: 3–15–1

William Van Bergen Van Dyck (September 8, 1875 – March 13, 1981) was an American college football player and coach, electrical engineer, and businessman. He played college football at Rutgers College in 1893 and 1894 and served as the first full-time head coach of the Rutgers Scarlet Knights football team during the 1898 and 1899 seasons. He was associated with the International General Electric Company from 1900 until his retirement in 1945. He founded the General Electric subsidiary in Brazil and participated in the lighting of the Strait of Magellan in 1906.

== Early years ==
Van Dyck was born in 1875 in New Brunswick, New Jersey. His father, Francis Cuyler Van Dyck, was the dean at Rutgers College, a science professor, and a friend of Thomas Edison.

== Rutgers and Columbia ==
Van Dyck began his education in the Scientific Section at Rutgers College. While at Rutgers, he was the Secretary of the Electrical Club, a baritone in the Rutgers Glee Club, and a member of Delta Phi, the Democratic Club, the Athletic Association, the Peithessophian Literary Society, and the "Van Club" (with the nickname "Double Dutch"). He also played at the fullback position on the Rutgers football team from 1893 to 1894, was captain of the 1894 football team, and played second base on the Rutgers baseball team. He missed a year of football after suffering a head injury, an injury he later recalled he would not have suffered if helmets had been used at the time. At the Rutgers Field Day held on May 13, 1893, Van Dyck finished in first place in a competition for throwing a baseball the longest distance. He threw the ball 311 feet.

Van Dyck received an electrical engineering degree from Columbia University in 1897 and a Master of Science degree from Rutgers College in 1899.

Van Dyck served as the head football coach for the Rutgers football team during the 1898 and 1899 seasons, reportedly becoming "the team's first full-time coach." He compiled a 3–15–1 record as the head coach at Rutgers. He was also a member of the faculty at Rutgers College in 1899. Van Dyck later recalled that he was not paid for his coaching duties and instead lived off his salary as a teacher.

== General Electric ==
In 1900, Van Dyck began a 45-year career with the International General Electric Company. In 1906, he reportedly worked on the project to light the Strait of Magellan on the southern tip of South America. From 1907 to 1911, he lived in Chile. As of 1909, Rutgers' alumni catalogue reported that Van Dyck was living in Valparaiso, Chile and engaged in the manufacturing business. From 1911 until 1925, he worked for General Electric in Brazil and founded the General Electric Company of Brazil. By 1916, he was reportedly a managing director of General Electric in Rio de Janeiro. He also participated in the first chess game played by "Wireless" in 1923. In 1925 or 1926, he returned to the United States and was employed by International General Electric Company in Schenectady, New York. He retired from General Electric in 1945.

== Family and later years ==
In 1901, Van Dyck married his second cousin, Frances Reynolds Johnson, who was at that time a well known-actress under the stage name "Fanny Johnson." She had recently appeared in the leading role in the popular musical comedy, "Florodora."

In September 1969, Van Dyck returned to Rutgers as "the oldest living Scarlet Knight" for a celebration of the 100th anniversary of the first college football game, played by Rutgers in 1869. At the time, Van Dyck told a reporter, "Drop kicking was the great thing in those days. We played shoulder-to-shoulder in the line. The ball was heavier and of a different shape. There was no forward pass or headgear or padding except long hair and a bit of rubber clamped between the teeth."

Van Dyck died at his home in Schenectady, New York, in March 1981, at age 105.

== Head coaching record ==
Year	Team	Overall	Conference	Standing	Bowl/playoffs
Rutgers Queensmen (Independent) (1898–1899)
1898	Rutgers	1–6–1			
1899	Rutgers	2–9			
Rutgers:		3–15–1			
Total:		3–15–1			
