= 1899 Rutgers Queensmen football team =

American college football season

1899 Rutgers Queensmen football
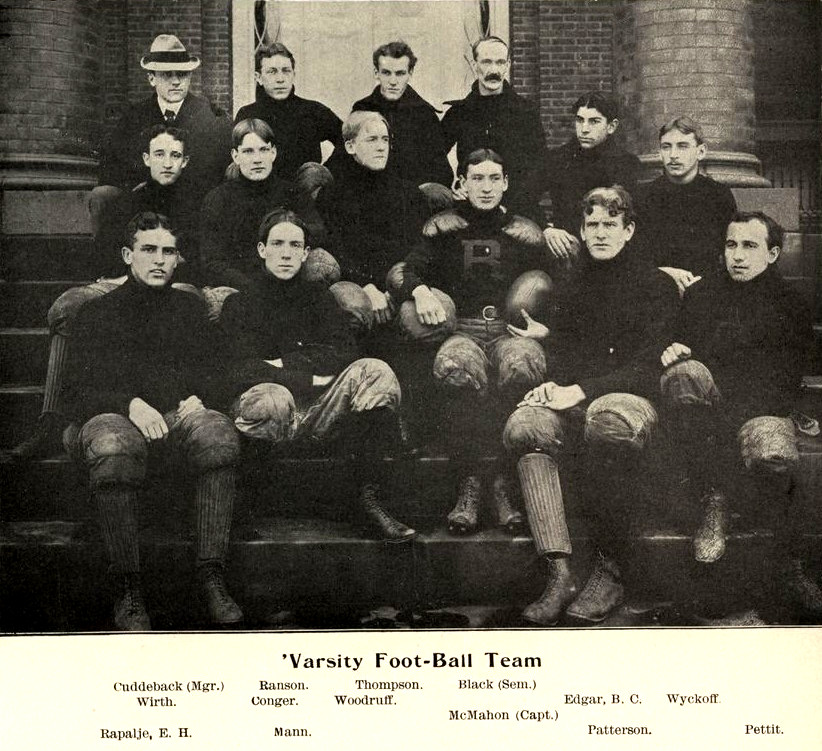
- Conference: Independent
- Record: 2–9
- Head coach: William V. B. Van Dyck (2nd season)
- Captain: William E. McMahon
- Home stadium: Neilson Field

1899 Eastern college football independents records
	Conf.			Overall
Team	W	L	T	W		L		T
Harvard		–		10	–	0	–	1
Lafayette		–		12	–	1	–	0
Princeton		–		12	–	1	–	0
Buffalo		–		7	–	1	–	0
Boston College		–		8	–	1	–	1
Carlisle		–		9	–	2	–	0
Swarthmore		–		8	–	1	–	2
Washington & Jefferson		–		9	–	2	–	1
Wesleyan		–		7	–	2	–	0
Pittsburgh College		–		2	–	0	–	2
Villanova		–		7	–	2	–	1
Yale		–		7	–	2	–	1
Western Univ. of Penn.		–		3	–	1	–	1
Columbia		–		9	–	3	–	0
Fordham		–		3	–	1	–	0
Cornell		–		7	–	3	–	0
Penn		–		8	–	3	–	2
Brown		–		7	–	3	–	1
New Hampshire		–		4	–	2	–	0
Vermont		–		5	–	3	–	0
Tufts		–		7	–	4	–	0
Bucknell		–		6	–	4	–	0
Dickinson		–		6	–	6	–	1
Holy Cross		–		5	–	5	–	0
Syracuse		–		4	–	4	–	0
Drexel		–		3	–	3	–	0
Army		–		4	–	5	–	0
Colgate		–		4	–	5	–	0
Penn State		–		4	–	6	–	1
Franklin & Marshall		–		3	–	5	–	1
NYU		–		2	–	6	–	0
Temple		–		1	–	4	–	1
Dartmouth		–		2	–	7	–	0
Lehigh		–		2	–	9	–	0
Rutgers		–		2	–	9	–	0
Geneva		–		0	–	3	–	0

The 1899 Rutgers Queensmen football team was an American football team that represented Rutgers University as an independent during the 1899 college football season. The 1899 Rutgers team compiled a 2–9 record and was outscored by opponents by a combined total of 245 to 114. William V. B. Van Dyck was the team's coach, and William E. McMahon was the team captain.

== Schedule ==
Date	Opponent	Site	Result	Source
October 3	Columbia	Neilson Field; New Brunswick, NJ	L 0–26	
October 7	at Lehigh	Bethlehem, PA	L 0–10	
October 14	at Lafayette	Lafayette Field; Easton, PA	L 0–37	
October 18	at Stevens	St. George's Cricket Grounds; Hoboken, NJ	L 5–12	
October 21	at Haverford	Walton Field; Haverford, PA	L 0–36	
October 25	Swarthmore	Neilson Field; New Brunswick, NJ	L 0–34	
October 28	at Ursinus	Norristown, PA	L 6–53	
November 4	Stevens	Neilson Field; New Brunswick, NJ	W 39–0	
November 11	NYU	Neilson Field; New Brunswick, NJ	L 5–6	
November 22	CCNY	Neilson Field; New Brunswick, NJ	W 59–0	
November 30	Knickerbocker Athletic Club	Neilson Field; New Brunswick, NJ	L 0–11	

== Players ==
- Black, right tackle
- Conger, right halfback
- Courtney, right tackle
- Edgar, quarterback
- Mann, left halfback
- William E. McMahon, fullback and captain
- Patterson, right guard
- Pettit, right end
- Ranson, center
- Rapalje, left end
- Wirth, left tackle
- Woodruff, left guard
