= Harvey Harman =

American football player and coach (1900–1969)

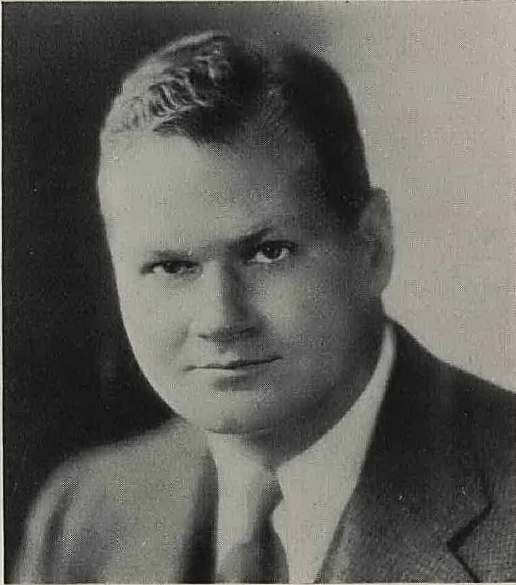
- Harman from The Scarlet Letter, 1940

Biographical details
- Born: November 5, 1900; Selinsgrove, Pennsylvania, U.S.
- Died: December 17, 1969 (aged 69); Highland Park, New Jersey, U.S.

Playing career
- 1920–1921: Pittsburgh
- Position: Tackle

Coaching career (HC unless noted)
- 1922–1929: Haverford
- 1930: Sewanee
- 1931–1937: Penn
- 1938–1941: Rutgers
- 1946–1955: Rutgers

Head coaching record
- Overall: 140–107–7

Accomplishments and honors

Championships
- 9 Middle Three (1938–1939, 1946–1949, 1952–1954)

Awards
- Amos Alonzo Stagg Award (1960)
- College Football Hall of Fame; Inducted in 1981 (profile)

Harvey John Harman (November 5, 1900 – December 17, 1969) was an American college football player and coach. He served as the head coach at Haverford College (1922–1929), Sewanee: The University of the South (1930), the University of Pennsylvania (1931–1937), and Rutgers University (1938–1941, 1946–1955), compiling a career college football record of 140–107–7. Harman was posthumously inducted into the College Football Hall of Fame as a coach in 1981.

Harman played college football at the University of Pittsburgh. From 1931 to 1937, he coached at Penn, where he compiled a 31–23–2 record. Between 1938 and 1955, he coached at Rutgers, where he compiled a 74–44–2 record. He served in the Navy during World War II.

Harman died on December 17, 1969, at his home in Highland Park, New Jersey.

== Head coaching record ==
Year	Team	Overall	Conference	Standing	Bowl/playoffs	AP^{#}
Haverford (Independent) (1922–1929)
1922	Haverford	1–6–1				
1923	Haverford	3–6				
1924	Haverford	3–6				
1925	Haverford	4–4				
1926	Haverford	6–1				
1927	Haverford	5–3				
1928	Haverford	4–4				
1929	Haverford	6–1–1				
Haverford:		32–31–1				
Sewanee Tigers (Southern Conference) (1930)
1930	Sewanee	3–6–1	1–4	18th		
Sewanee:		3–6–1	1–4			
Penn Quakers (Independent) (1931–1937)
1931	Penn	6–3				
1932	Penn	6–2				
1933	Penn	2–4–1				
1934	Penn	4–4				
1935	Penn	4–4				
1936	Penn	7–1				10
1937	Penn	2–5–1				
Penn:		31–23–2				
Rutgers Queensmen (Middle Three Conference) (1938–1941)
1938	Rutgers	7–1	2–0	1st		
1939	Rutgers	7–1–1	2–0	1st		
1940	Rutgers	5–4	1–1	2nd		
1941	Rutgers	7–2	1–1	2nd		
Rutgers Queensmen / Scarlet Knights (Middle Three Conference) (1946–1955)
1946	Rutgers	7–2	2–0	1st		
1947	Rutgers	8–1	2–0	1st		
1948	Rutgers	7–2	2–0	1st		
1949	Rutgers	6–3	2–0	1st		
1950	Rutgers	4–4	1–1	2nd		
1951	Rutgers	4–4	1–1	2nd		
1952	Rutgers	4–4–1	1–0	T–1st		
1953	Rutgers	2–6	1–0	1st		
1954	Rutgers	3–6	1–1	T–1st		
1955	Rutgers	3–5	0–2	3rd		
Rutgers:		33–26–1	19–7			
Total:		140–104–7				
National championship Conference title Conference division title or championship game berth

== See also ==
- List of college football head coaches with non-consecutive tenure
