= Taylor Stadium (Lehigh) =

Football stadium of Lehigh University

Coordinates: 40°36′28.13″N 75°22′24.48″W

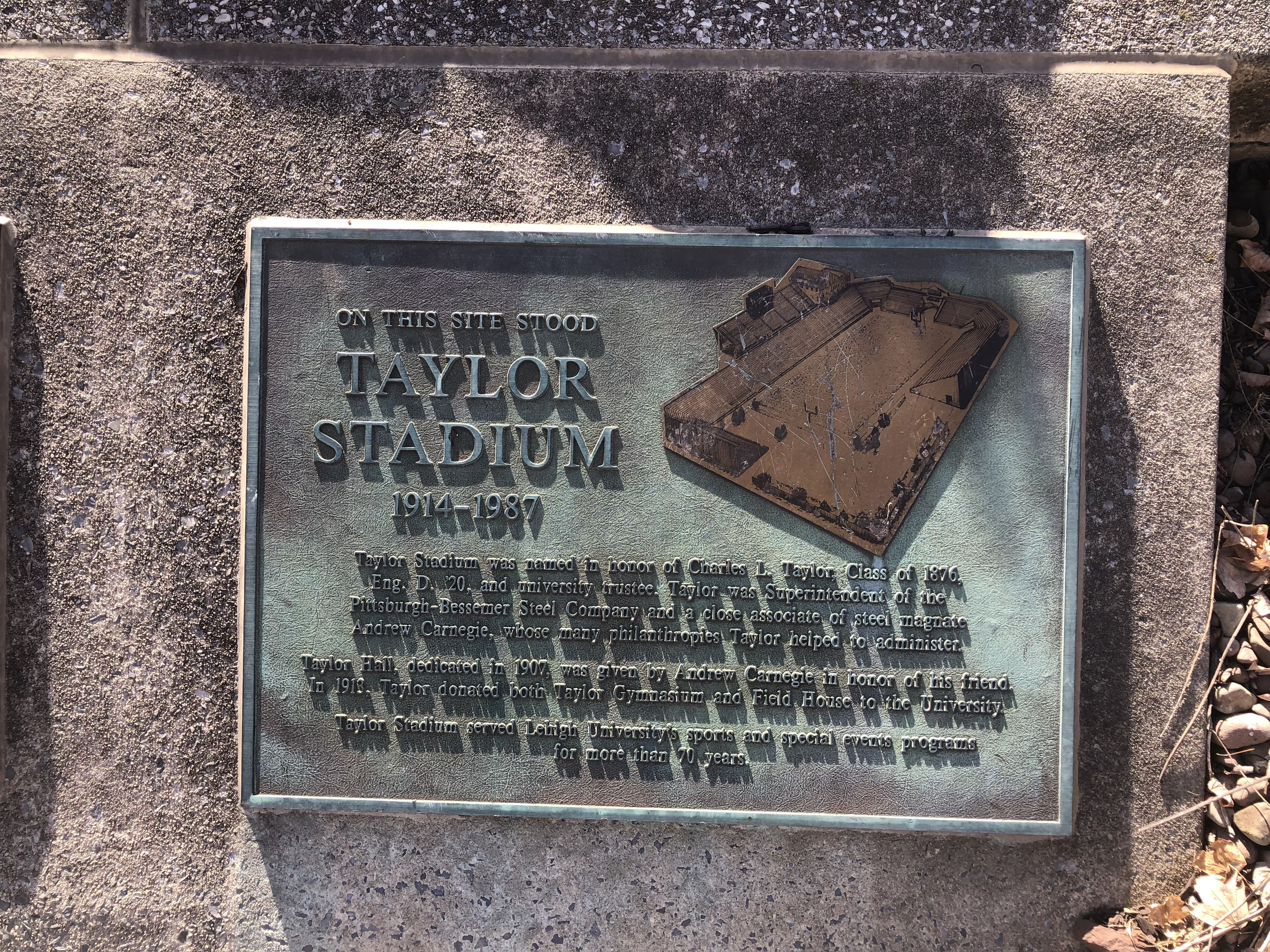
- Taylor Stadium's Memorial Plaque
- Interactive map of Taylor Stadium
- Full name: Taylor Stadium
- Location: Bethlehem, Pennsylvania, U.S.
- Owner: Lehigh University
- Operator: Lehigh University
- Capacity: 20,000

Construction
- Opened: 1914
- Closed: 1987
- Architect: Henry Hornbostel
- Structural engineer: Charles W. Leavitt

Tenant
- Lehigh Engineers football (1914–1987)

Taylor Stadium was a stadium in Bethlehem, Pennsylvania that hosted the Lehigh University Engineers football team from 1914 until 1988, when the team moved to Goodman Stadium in Bethlehem.

== History ==
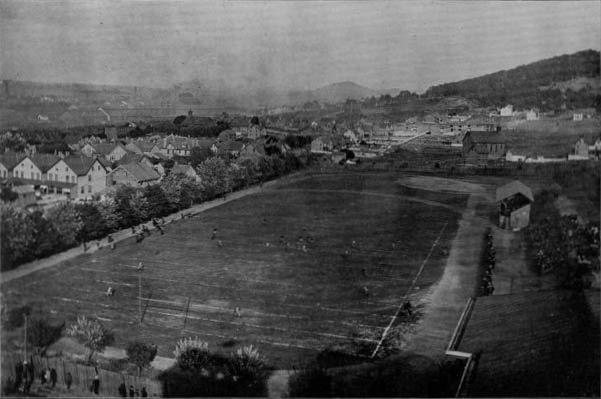
The practice fields in 1896 where Taylor Stadium would be erected

Prior to becoming a stadium the area was a practice field with no bleachers. Charles L. Taylor, an alumnus from the class of 1876, proposed turning the field into a purpose built stadium. Construction was largely financed by alumni donations, with the single largest donation coming from Charles M. Schwab and his wife Emma Schwab. The stadium opened in 1914 making it just the third concrete stadium in the United States.

The stadium would be used by the Lehigh Engineers football, baseball, soccer, lacrosse, and track and field teams as their primary venue. Later in the stadium's life Bethlehem Steel donated a grandstand increasing the stadium's capacity to 20,000.

In 1987 Lehigh University sought to diversify its courses and build a business school. Despite the stadium's historical significance, and cultural identity as being the home for Lehigh football for 70 years, the university demolished the stadium and built the Rauch Business Center and Zoellner Arts Center on its location. The last game to be played at Taylor was the frigid 123rd meeting of Le-Laf with the Lehigh Engineers overcoming the -20º windchill and the Lafayette Leopards 17-10. The following 1988 season the Engineers would play in the new 14,000 seat Goodman Stadium at the Goodman campus located on the other side of South Mountain.

== Legacy ==
Despite the stadium showing its age in its later years, in interviews, many alumni who had the experience to visit prefer it to Goodman. This comes despite its shortcomings in the lack of parking, bathrooms, and comfortable seats. Due to the fact it was a short walk from anywhere on campus, every game at Taylor was sold out as both Lehigh students and Bethlehem residents often filled the stadium beyond capacity. Additionally, the bleachers at Taylor were right behind the players benches allowing fans to be as close as possible to the field while at Goodman there is a large separation between the two. Lastly, the decision to demolish the stadium in the first place was not well received by the student body and attendance to football games dropped dramatically which wasn't helped by the fact Goodman stadium requires driving or taking a bus to get to and from Asa Packer campus.
