= Middle Three Conference =

Former American sports conference

- Association: NCAA
- Founded: 1929; 97 years ago
- Folded: 1969; 57 years ago
- Division: University Division (Rutgers); College Division (Lafayette and Lehigh)
- No. of teams: 3
- Region: New Jersey and Pennsylvania

The Middle Three Conference was an intercollegiate athletic scheduling alliance from 1929 to 1969. It had three members throughout its 41-year existence: Lafayette College and Lehigh University in Pennsylvania, and Rutgers University in New Jersey. Administratively, the "conference" was little more than a three-way rivalry; there was no league commissioner or central office for scheduling or enforcement.

Lafayette, Lehigh and Rutgers competed for a Middle Three championship in several sports, including baseball, men's basketball and football. In all sports, the Middle Three was part of the Middle Atlantic Conference (MAC), University Division, from the 1958–59 season to the 1961–62 season, when Rutgers withdrew from the MAC.

Locations of Lafayette and Lehigh in eastern Pennsylvania, and Rutgers in central New Jersey

== History ==
By the end of the 1920s, the Lafayette Leopards, Lehigh Brown and White and Rutgers Queensmen had been longtime rivals, regularly scheduling annual games on their independent schedules. On May 12, 1929, representatives of the three colleges agreed to formalize their annual matchups and compete for a championship.

As there was no official league structure, there was no formal announcement of the Middle Three Conference dissolving. By 1970, local newspapers had stopped reporting Middle Three football championships. Early in the 1970 season, the Associated Press stated that Lehigh's win over Rutgers was "the start of Lehigh's Middle Three Conference title defense" (as 1969 conference champion). The principal newspapers covering Middle Three teams, The Morning Call of Allentown, Pennsylvania, and The Home News of New Brunswick, New Jersey, make no mention of the conference during their coverage of the 1970 or 1971 seasons. By 1972, Lehigh and Rutgers were being referred to as "the old Middle Three rivals".

Lehigh changed its athletic teams' nickname to "Engineers" before the 1931 season; its current name, "Mountain Hawks", was adopted in 1996, long after the Middle Three folded. Rutgers dropped "Queensmen" in favor of "Scarlet Knights" in 1955.

After the Middle Three era ended, Lafayette and Lehigh continued to compete mainly with mid-sized colleges in the northeastern United States, eventually helping to found the Patriot League in Division I FCS in the 1980s. Rutgers, on the other hand, pushed into the highest level of collegiate competition, joining the Big East in 1991 and the Big Ten Conference in 2014.

== Football ==
In football, the Middle Three Conference continued a long tradition of Lafayette, Lehigh and Rutgers meeting on the gridiron. The Lafayette–Rutgers series dated back to the start of Lafayette football in 1882, and had been played 24 times by 1929, including annual matchups since 1921. Lafayette–Lehigh and Lehigh–Rutgers matchups were both present on Lehigh's inaugural schedule in 1884. The former, known as "The Rivalry", had been played every year except 1896, sometimes more than once a year. The Lehigh–Rutgers annual series had been uninterrupted since 1918.

The three colleges continued to play a round-robin as part of their football schedules throughout the 41 years of Middle Three competition, with the exception of 1936 (Lafayette–Rutgers not played), 1952 and 1953 (Lehigh–Rutgers not played). During the 1943 and 1944 seasons, as World War II travel restrictions and military training disrupted the usual college football schedules, the Middle Three teams played a double round-robin, scheduling home-and-home series against each other.

Even after the last declared championship in 1969, the round-robin remained in place until 1975, after which Rutgers dropped Lafayette from its schedule; they have not met since then. The Lehigh–Rutgers series ended in 1977 and has not been renewed. Lafayette–Lehigh continues as an annual rivalry.

=== Football champions ===
The championship was determined solely by games against Middle Three rivals; these records are given in parentheses in the list below. NCAA rules did not allow overtime play during the Middle Three era, so records could include tie games. Because Middle Three games made up such a small proportion of the overall schedule (most years, just two games out of a full season of eight to 10), teams could win the Middle Three despite posting a losing overall record.

- 1929 – Lafayette, Lehigh, and Rutgers (1–1)
- 1930 – Lafayette (2–0)
- 1931 – Lafayette (2–0)
- 1932 – Rutgers (2–0)
- 1933 – Rutgers (2–0)
- 1934 – Rutgers (2–0)
- 1935 – Rutgers (2–0)
- 1936 – Lehigh (2–0)
- 1937 – Lafayette (2–0)
- 1938 – Rutgers (2–0)
- 1939 – Rutgers (2–0)
- 1940 – Lafayette (2–0)
- 1941 – Lafayette (2–0)
- 1942 – Lafayette and Lehigh (1–0–1)
- 1943 – Lafayette and Rutgers (3–1)
- 1944 – Lafayette (4–0)
- 1945 – Rutgers (2–0)
- 1946 – Rutgers (2–0)
- 1947 – Rutgers (2–0)
- 1948 – Rutgers (2–0)
- 1949 – Rutgers (2–0)
- 1950 – Lehigh (2–0)
- 1951 – Lehigh (2–0)
- 1952 – Lehigh and Rutgers (1–0)
- 1953 – Rutgers (1–0)
- 1954 – Lafayette, Lehigh, and Rutgers (1–1)
- 1955 – Lafayette (2–0)
- 1956 – Lehigh (2–0)
- 1957 – Lehigh (2–0)
- 1958 – Rutgers (2–0)
- 1959 – Rutgers (2–0)
- 1960 – Rutgers (2–0)
- 1961 – Rutgers (2–0)
- 1962 – Rutgers (2–0)
- 1963 – Rutgers (2–0)
- 1964 – Rutgers (2–0)
- 1965 – Lafayette, Lehigh, and Rutgers (1–1)
- 1966 – Rutgers (2–0)
- 1967 – Rutgers (2–0)
- 1968 – Rutgers (2–0)
- 1969 – Lehigh (2–0)

The total number of championships ended: Rutgers 24, Lafayette 8 and Lehigh 8.

== Basketball champions ==
- 1943 – Rutgers
- 1949 – Rutgers
- 1950 – Lafayette and Rutgers
- 1951 – Rutgers
- 1952 – Lafayette

== See also ==
- List of defunct college football conferences
- List of defunct men's college basketball conferences in the United States
- Big Ten Conference – the current home of Rutgers
- Patriot League – the current home of Lafayette and Lehigh
