= 1945 Fourth Air Force Flyers football team =

American college football season

1945 Fourth Air Force Flyers football

Legion Bowl, W 27–0 vs. Army Air Forces Training Command
- Conference: Army Air Forces League
- Record: 6–3–1 (3–2–1 AAF League)
- Head coach: Johnny Baker (1st season)
- Home stadium: Los Angeles Memorial Coliseum

1945 military service football records
	Conf.					Overall
Team	W		L		T	W		L		T
Army Air Forces League
Third Air Force +	4	–	1	–	1	7	–	2	–	1
AAF Training Command +	4	–	1	–	1	8	–	3	–	1
Fourth Air Force	3	–	2	–	1	6	–	3	–	1
First Air Force	2	–	2	–	2	3	–	2	–	3
Air Transport Command	2	–	3	–	1	6	–	3	–	2
Personnel Distribution Command	2	–	4	–	0	6	–	5	–	0
Second Air Force	1	–	5	–	0	3	–	7	–	0
Independents
Fleet City			–			11	–	0	–	1
Jacksonville NAS			–			9	–	2	–	0
Hutchinson NAS			–			8	–	0	–	0
Selman Field			–			8	–	1	–	0
El Toro Marines			–			8	–	2	–	0
Corpus Christi NAS			–			7	–	1	–	0
North Camp Hood			–			7	–	1	–	0
Little Creek			–			7	–	2	–	0
Santa Barbara Marines			–			7	–	3	–	1
Camp Lee			–			7	–	4	–	0
Camp Beale			–			6	–	1	–	2
Farragut NTS			–			6	–	2	–	0
Eastern Flying Training Command			–			6	–	3	–	1
Great Lakes Navy			–			6	–	4	–	1
Hondo AAF			–			6	–	4	–	1
South Camp Hood			–			5	–	2	–	0
Camp Peary			–			5	–	3	–	0
Bainbridge			–			5	–	4	–	0
Fort Benning			–			5	–	4	–	1
Fort Warren			–			5	–	7	–	0
Fort McClellan			–			4	–	2	–	0
San Diego NTS			–			4	–	2	–	0
Atlantic City NAS			–			4	–	2	–	1
Minter Field			–			4	–	2	–	1
Williams Field			–			4	–	4	–	0
Stockton AAF			–			4	–	5	–	2
Barksdale Field			–			4	–	7	–	0
Fort Pierce			–			4	–	9	–	0
Amarillo AAF			–			3	–	1	–	0
Olathe NAS			–			3	–	2	–	0
Albany Navy			–			3	–	3	–	1
Camp Detrick			–			3	–	4	–	0
Kearney AAF			–			3	–	4	–	0
Bergstrom Field			–			3	–	5	–	1
Keesler Field			–			3	–	6	–	1
Melville PT Boats			–			2	–	1	–	0
Great Bend AAF			–			2	–	4	–	0
Saint Mary's Pre-Flight			–			2	–	4	–	1
Gulfport AAF			–			2	–	5	–	0
Pensacola NAS			–			2	–	7	–	1
Squantum NAS			–			1	–	1	–	0
Camp Blanding			–			1	–	2	–	0
Luke Field			–			1	–	2	–	0
Miami NAS			–			1	–	2	–	0
Miami NTC			–			1	–	3	–	0
NSB New London			–			1	–	3	–	0
Oceana NAS			–			1	–	3	–	0
Fort Riley			–			1	–	4	–	0
Lake Charles AAF			–			1	–	4	–	0
Ellington Field			–			1	–	4	–	1
Cherry Point Marines			–			1	–	8	–	0
Dalhart AAF			–			0	–	3	–	0
Homestead AAB			–			0	–	3	–	0
Fort Monroe			–			0	–	7	–	0
+ – Conference co-champions

The 1945 Fourth Air Force Flyers football team represented the Fourth Air Force based at March Field, in Southern California, during the 1945 college football season. The Flyers competed in the Army Air Forces League (AAF League) with six others teams from the United States Army Air Forces. Led by head coach Johnny Baker, the team compiled an overall record of 6–3–1 with a mark of 3–2–1 in league play, placing third in the AAF League. The Flyers ended the regular season with a win over the Third Air Force Gremlins, who earned a shared of the League title. The Flyers were recognized as the "most interesting" team in the league and selected to face the Army Air Forces Training Command Skymasters, the other co-champion of the league, in a postseason benefit game, the Legion Bowl in Memphis, Tennessee. The Skymasters had beaten the Flyers earlier in the season in Fort Worth, Texas, but the Flyers avenged the loss with a 27–0 victory in Memphis on December 16.

The Fourth Air Force Flyers were ranked 15th among the nation's college and service teams in the final Litkenhous Ratings.

== Schedule ==
Date	Time	Opponent	Site	Result	Attendance	Source
September 8	8:00 p.m.	vs. Fort Warren*	Gonzaga Stadium; Spokane, WA	W 25–0	11,000	
September 14	8:30 p.m.	Second Air Force	Los Angeles Memorial Coliseum; Los Angeles, CA	W 17–14	61,650	
September 30		vs. Air Transport Command	Cotton Bowl; Dallas, TX	W 21–14	5,000	
October 14	2:30 p.m.	at Saint Mary's Pre-Flight*	Kezar Stadium; San Francisco, CA	W 20–7	22,000	
October 22	12:30 p.m.	at AAF Training Command	Farrington Field; Fort Worth, TX	L 7–19	13,000	
October 28	11:00 a.m.	vs. First Air Force	Baltimore Stadium; Baltimore, MD	T 6–6	7,000	
November 11		Personnel Distribution Command	Los Angeles Memorial Coliseum; Los Angeles, CA	L 7–9	15,000	
November 25	2:00 p.m.	at Fleet City*	Kezar Stadium; San Francisco, CA	L 10–20	50,000	
December 2	2:00 p.m.	Third Air Force	Los Angeles Memorial Memorial Coliseum; Los Angeles, CA	W 10–7	10,000–12,000	
December 16	11:00 a.m.	vs. AAF Training Command*	Crump Stadium; Memphis, TN (Legion Bowl)	W 27–0	6,000	
*Non-conference game; All times are in Pacific time
