= 1945 Stockton Army Air Field Commandos football team =

American college football season

1945 Stockton Army Air Field Commandos football
- Conference: Independent
- Record: 4–5–2
- Head coach: Gordon Rice (1st season)
- Home stadium: Baxter Stadium

1945 military service football records
	Conf.					Overall
Team	W		L		T	W		L		T
Army Air Forces League
Third Air Force +	4	–	1	–	1	7	–	2	–	1
AAF Training Command +	4	–	1	–	1	8	–	3	–	1
Fourth Air Force	3	–	2	–	1	6	–	3	–	1
First Air Force	2	–	2	–	2	3	–	2	–	3
Air Transport Command	2	–	3	–	1	6	–	3	–	2
Personnel Distribution Command	2	–	4	–	0	6	–	5	–	0
Second Air Force	1	–	5	–	0	3	–	7	–	0
Independents
Fleet City			–			11	–	0	–	1
Jacksonville NAS			–			9	–	2	–	0
Hutchinson NAS			–			8	–	0	–	0
Selman Field			–			8	–	1	–	0
El Toro Marines			–			8	–	2	–	0
Corpus Christi NAS			–			7	–	1	–	0
North Camp Hood			–			7	–	1	–	0
Little Creek			–			7	–	2	–	0
Santa Barbara Marines			–			7	–	3	–	1
Camp Lee			–			7	–	4	–	0
Camp Beale			–			6	–	1	–	2
Farragut NTS			–			6	–	2	–	0
Eastern Flying Training Command			–			6	–	3	–	1
Great Lakes Navy			–			6	–	4	–	1
Hondo AAF			–			6	–	4	–	1
South Camp Hood			–			5	–	2	–	0
Camp Peary			–			5	–	3	–	0
Bainbridge			–			5	–	4	–	0
Fort Benning			–			5	–	4	–	1
Fort Warren			–			5	–	7	–	0
Fort McClellan			–			4	–	2	–	0
San Diego NTS			–			4	–	2	–	0
Atlantic City NAS			–			4	–	2	–	1
Minter Field			–			4	–	2	–	1
Williams Field			–			4	–	4	–	0
Stockton AAF			–			4	–	5	–	2
Barksdale Field			–			4	–	7	–	0
Fort Pierce			–			4	–	9	–	0
Amarillo AAF			–			3	–	1	–	0
Olathe NAS			–			3	–	2	–	0
Albany Navy			–			3	–	3	–	1
Camp Detrick			–			3	–	4	–	0
Kearney AAF			–			3	–	4	–	0
Bergstrom Field			–			3	–	5	–	1
Keesler Field			–			3	–	6	–	1
Melville PT Boats			–			2	–	1	–	0
Great Bend AAF			–			2	–	4	–	0
Saint Mary's Pre-Flight			–			2	–	4	–	1
Gulfport AAF			–			2	–	5	–	0
Pensacola NAS			–			2	–	7	–	1
Squantum NAS			–			1	–	1	–	0
Camp Blanding			–			1	–	2	–	0
Luke Field			–			1	–	2	–	0
Miami NAS			–			1	–	2	–	0
Miami NTC			–			1	–	3	–	0
NSB New London			–			1	–	3	–	0
Oceana NAS			–			1	–	3	–	0
Fort Riley			–			1	–	4	–	0
Lake Charles AAF			–			1	–	4	–	0
Ellington Field			–			1	–	4	–	1
Cherry Point Marines			–			1	–	8	–	0
Dalhart AAF			–			0	–	3	–	0
Homestead AAB			–			0	–	3	–	0
Fort Monroe			–			0	–	7	–	0
+ – Conference co-champions

The 1945 Stockton Army Air Field Commandos team represented the United States Army Air Forces's Stockton Army Air Field (Stockton AAF) and the Stockton Ordinance Depot in Stockton, California during the 1945 college football season. Led by head coach Gordon Rice, the Commandos compiled a record of 4–5–2.

Stockton AAF ranked 131st among the nation's college and service teams in the final Litkenhous Ratings.

== Schedule ==
Date	Time	Opponent	Site	Result	Attendance	Source
August 31	8:00 p.m.	at Pacific (CA)	Baxter Stadium; Stockton, CA	W 12–6		
September 8	8:00 p.m.	at Santa Barbara Marines	La Playa Stadium; Santa Barbara, CA	L 0–26	4,000	
September 22	8:00 p.m.	at Camp Beale	Knight Field; Marysville, CA	T 0–0	5,000	
September 30	2:30 p.m.	at Saint Mary's	Kezar Stadium; San Francisco, CA	L 0–26	30,000	
October 6	8:00 p.m.	McClellan Field	Baxter Stadium; Stockton, CA	W 27–0		
October 13	8:00 p.m.	Minter Field	Baxter Stadium; Stockton, CA	L 0–12		
October 19		Albany Navy	Baxter Stadium; Stockton, CA	T 20–20		
November 3	8:00 p.m.	Camp Pendleton	Baxter Stadium; Stockton, CA	L 6–13		
November 9		at Compton	Ramsaur Stadium; Compton, CA	L 7–19	9,000	
November 17		Stanford	Stanford Stadium; Stanford, CA	W 19–13	10,000	
November 30		at Pacific (CA)	Baxter Stadium; Stockton, CA	W 6–0		
All times are in Pacific time
