= 1945 Gulfport Army Air Field Bombers football team =

American college football season

1945 Gulfport Army Air Field Bombers football
- Conference: Independent
- Record: 2–5
- Head coach: John Walsh

1945 military service football records
| | Conf. | | | | | Overall |
| Team | W | | L | | T | W | | L | | T |
|---|---|---|---|---|---|---|---|---|---|---|
Army Air Forces League
| Third Air Force + | 4 | – | 1 | – | 1 | 7 | – | 2 | – | 1 |
| AAF Training Command + | 4 | – | 1 | – | 1 | 8 | – | 3 | – | 1 |
| Fourth Air Force | 3 | – | 2 | – | 1 | 6 | – | 3 | – | 1 |
| First Air Force | 2 | – | 2 | – | 2 | 3 | – | 2 | – | 3 |
| Air Transport Command | 2 | – | 3 | – | 1 | 6 | – | 3 | – | 2 |
| Personnel Distribution Command | 2 | – | 4 | – | 0 | 6 | – | 5 | – | 0 |
| Second Air Force | 1 | – | 5 | – | 0 | 3 | – | 7 | – | 0 |
Independents
| Fleet City | | | – | | | 11 | – | 0 | – | 1 |
| Jacksonville NAS | | | – | | | 9 | – | 2 | – | 0 |
| Hutchinson NAS | | | – | | | 8 | – | 0 | – | 0 |
| Selman Field | | | – | | | 8 | – | 1 | – | 0 |
| El Toro Marines | | | – | | | 8 | – | 2 | – | 0 |
| Corpus Christi NAS | | | – | | | 7 | – | 1 | – | 0 |
| North Camp Hood | | | – | | | 7 | – | 1 | – | 0 |
| Little Creek | | | – | | | 7 | – | 2 | – | 0 |
| Santa Barbara Marines | | | – | | | 7 | – | 3 | – | 1 |
| Camp Lee | | | – | | | 7 | – | 4 | – | 0 |
| Camp Beale | | | – | | | 6 | – | 1 | – | 2 |
| Farragut NTS | | | – | | | 6 | – | 2 | – | 0 |
| Eastern Flying Training Command | | | – | | | 6 | – | 3 | – | 1 |
| Great Lakes Navy | | | – | | | 6 | – | 4 | – | 1 |
| Hondo AAF | | | – | | | 6 | – | 4 | – | 1 |
| South Camp Hood | | | – | | | 5 | – | 2 | – | 0 |
| Camp Peary | | | – | | | 5 | – | 3 | – | 0 |
| Bainbridge | | | – | | | 5 | – | 4 | – | 0 |
| Fort Benning | | | – | | | 5 | – | 4 | – | 1 |
| Fort Warren | | | – | | | 5 | – | 7 | – | 0 |
| Fort McClellan | | | – | | | 4 | – | 2 | – | 0 |
| San Diego NTS | | | – | | | 4 | – | 2 | – | 0 |
| Atlantic City NAS | | | – | | | 4 | – | 2 | – | 1 |
| Minter Field | | | – | | | 4 | – | 2 | – | 1 |
| Williams Field | | | – | | | 4 | – | 4 | – | 0 |
| Stockton AAF | | | – | | | 4 | – | 5 | – | 2 |
| Barksdale Field | | | – | | | 4 | – | 7 | – | 0 |
| Fort Pierce | | | – | | | 4 | – | 9 | – | 0 |
| Amarillo AAF | | | – | | | 3 | – | 1 | – | 0 |
| Olathe NAS | | | – | | | 3 | – | 2 | – | 0 |
| Albany Navy | | | – | | | 3 | – | 3 | – | 1 |
| Camp Detrick | | | – | | | 3 | – | 4 | – | 0 |
| Kearney AAF | | | – | | | 3 | – | 4 | – | 0 |
| Bergstrom Field | | | – | | | 3 | – | 5 | – | 1 |
| Keesler Field | | | – | | | 3 | – | 6 | – | 1 |
| Melville PT Boats | | | – | | | 2 | – | 1 | – | 0 |
| Great Bend AAF | | | – | | | 2 | – | 4 | – | 0 |
| Saint Mary's Pre-Flight | | | – | | | 2 | – | 4 | – | 1 |
| Gulfport AAF | | | – | | | 2 | – | 5 | – | 0 |
| Pensacola NAS | | | – | | | 2 | – | 7 | – | 1 |
| Squantum NAS | | | – | | | 1 | – | 1 | – | 0 |
| Camp Blanding | | | – | | | 1 | – | 2 | – | 0 |
| Luke Field | | | – | | | 1 | – | 2 | – | 0 |
| Miami NAS | | | – | | | 1 | – | 2 | – | 0 |
| Miami NTC | | | – | | | 1 | – | 3 | – | 0 |
| NSB New London | | | – | | | 1 | – | 3 | – | 0 |
| Oceana NAS | | | – | | | 1 | – | 3 | – | 0 |
| Fort Riley | | | – | | | 1 | – | 4 | – | 0 |
| Lake Charles AAF | | | – | | | 1 | – | 4 | – | 0 |
| Ellington Field | | | – | | | 1 | – | 4 | – | 1 |
| Cherry Point Marines | | | – | | | 1 | – | 8 | – | 0 |
| Dalhart AAF | | | – | | | 0 | – | 3 | – | 0 |
| Homestead AAB | | | – | | | 0 | – | 3 | – | 0 |
| Fort Monroe | | | – | | | 0 | – | 7 | – | 0 |
+ – Conference co-champions

The 1945 Gulfport Army Air Field Bombers football team represented the United States Army Air Forces's Gulfport Army Air Field (Gulport AAF), also called Gulfport Army Air Base (Gulfport AAB), in Mississippi during the 1945 college football season. The Bombers compiled a record of 2–5. Captain John Walsh was the team's head coach.

Gulfport AAF ranked 119th among the nation's college and service teams in the final Litkenhous Ratings.

== Schedule ==
| Date | Time | Opponent | Site | Result | Attendance | Source |
|---|---|---|---|---|---|---|
| September 23 | 2:30 p.m. | at Eastern Flying Training Command | Cramton Bowl; Montgomery, AL | L 0–40 | 6,000 | |
| September 29 | | Tulane | Gulfport, MS | L 0–14 (scrimmage) | 4,000 | |
| October 6 | | at Pensacola NAS | Air Station Field; Pensacola, FL | L 7–20 | | |
| October 13 | | at Selman Field | Monroe, LA | W 13–7 | | |
| October 21 | | Homestead AAB | Gulfport, MS | W 32–0 | 4,000 | |
| October 27 | | Selman Field | Gulfport, MS | L 25–47 | 4,000 | |
| November 4 | | Keesler Field | Flier Field; Biloxi, MS | L 0–14 | 8,000 | |
| November 11 | | Pensacola NAS | Gulfport, MS | L 7–26 | 3,500 | |
All times are in Central time
