= 1945 Fort Monroe Gunners football team =

American college football season

1945 Fort Monroe Gunners football
- Conference: Independent
- Record: 0–7
- Head coach: Nelson T. Turner & Phil Davis (1st season)
- Home stadium: Fort Monroe parade ground, Darlington Memorial Park

1945 military service football records
	Conf.					Overall
Team	W		L		T	W		L		T
Army Air Forces League
Third Air Force +	4	–	1	–	1	7	–	2	–	1
AAF Training Command +	4	–	1	–	1	8	–	3	–	1
Fourth Air Force	3	–	2	–	1	6	–	3	–	1
First Air Force	2	–	2	–	2	3	–	2	–	3
Air Transport Command	2	–	3	–	1	6	–	3	–	2
Personnel Distribution Command	2	–	4	–	0	6	–	5	–	0
Second Air Force	1	–	5	–	0	3	–	7	–	0
Independents
Fleet City			–			11	–	0	–	1
Jacksonville NAS			–			9	–	2	–	0
Hutchinson NAS			–			8	–	0	–	0
Selman Field			–			8	–	1	–	0
El Toro Marines			–			8	–	2	–	0
Corpus Christi NAS			–			7	–	1	–	0
North Camp Hood			–			7	–	1	–	0
Little Creek			–			7	–	2	–	0
Santa Barbara Marines			–			7	–	3	–	1
Camp Lee			–			7	–	4	–	0
Camp Beale			–			6	–	1	–	2
Farragut NTS			–			6	–	2	–	0
Eastern Flying Training Command			–			6	–	3	–	1
Great Lakes Navy			–			6	–	4	–	1
Hondo AAF			–			6	–	4	–	1
South Camp Hood			–			5	–	2	–	0
Camp Peary			–			5	–	3	–	0
Bainbridge			–			5	–	4	–	0
Fort Benning			–			5	–	4	–	1
Fort Warren			–			5	–	7	–	0
Fort McClellan			–			4	–	2	–	0
San Diego NTS			–			4	–	2	–	0
Atlantic City NAS			–			4	–	2	–	1
Minter Field			–			4	–	2	–	1
Williams Field			–			4	–	4	–	0
Stockton AAF			–			4	–	5	–	2
Barksdale Field			–			4	–	7	–	0
Fort Pierce			–			4	–	9	–	0
Amarillo AAF			–			3	–	1	–	0
Olathe NAS			–			3	–	2	–	0
Albany Navy			–			3	–	3	–	1
Camp Detrick			–			3	–	4	–	0
Kearney AAF			–			3	–	4	–	0
Bergstrom Field			–			3	–	5	–	1
Keesler Field			–			3	–	6	–	1
Melville PT Boats			–			2	–	1	–	0
Great Bend AAF			–			2	–	4	–	0
Saint Mary's Pre-Flight			–			2	–	4	–	1
Gulfport AAF			–			2	–	5	–	0
Pensacola NAS			–			2	–	7	–	1
Squantum NAS			–			1	–	1	–	0
Camp Blanding			–			1	–	2	–	0
Luke Field			–			1	–	2	–	0
Miami NAS			–			1	–	2	–	0
Miami NTC			–			1	–	3	–	0
NSB New London			–			1	–	3	–	0
Oceana NAS			–			1	–	3	–	0
Fort Riley			–			1	–	4	–	0
Lake Charles AAF			–			1	–	4	–	0
Ellington Field			–			1	–	4	–	1
Cherry Point Marines			–			1	–	8	–	0
Dalhart AAF			–			0	–	3	–	0
Homestead AAB			–			0	–	3	–	0
Fort Monroe			–			0	–	7	–	0
+ – Conference co-champions

The 1945 Fort Monroe Gunners football team represented the United States Army's Fort Monroe in Hampton, Virginia during the 1945 college football season. Led by coaches Nelson T. Turner and Phil Davis, the Gunners compiled a record of 0–7.

Fort Monroe ranked 288th among the nation's college and service teams in the final Litkenhous Ratings.

== Schedule ==
Date	Time	Opponent	Site	Result	Attendance	Source
September 22	8:00 p.m.	at Catawba	Salisbury, NC	L 0–34	2,000	
September 29	2:30 p.m.	Kinston Marines	Fort Monroe parade ground; Hampton, VA	L 7–13		
October 6	2:30 p.m.	Camp Detrick	Fort Monroe parade ground; Hampton, VA	L 0–7		
October 14		at Camp Peary	Peary Field; Williamsburg, VA	L 0–40	12,000	
October 19	8:00 p.m.	Oak Grove Marines	Darlington Memorial Park; Hampton, VA	L 0–7	2,500	
October 27		Aberdeen Proving Ground	Edgewood, MD	cancelled		
November 4		Bainbridge		cancelled		
November 9	2:00 p.m.	at Oceana NAS	Virginia Beach, VA	L 0–19		
November 16		at Camp Detrick	Frederick, MD	L 0–21		
All times are in Eastern time
