= 1945 Camp Detrick Army Chemists football team =

American college football season

1945 Camp Detrick Army Chemists football
- Conference: Independent
- Record: 3–4

1945 military service football records
	Conf.					Overall
Team	W		L		T	W		L		T
Army Air Forces League
Third Air Force +	4	–	1	–	1	7	–	2	–	1
AAF Training Command +	4	–	1	–	1	8	–	3	–	1
Fourth Air Force	3	–	2	–	1	6	–	3	–	1
First Air Force	2	–	2	–	2	3	–	2	–	3
Air Transport Command	2	–	3	–	1	6	–	3	–	2
Personnel Distribution Command	2	–	4	–	0	6	–	5	–	0
Second Air Force	1	–	5	–	0	3	–	7	–	0
Independents
Fleet City			–			11	–	0	–	1
Jacksonville NAS			–			9	–	2	–	0
Hutchinson NAS			–			8	–	0	–	0
Selman Field			–			8	–	1	–	0
El Toro Marines			–			8	–	2	–	0
Corpus Christi NAS			–			7	–	1	–	0
North Camp Hood			–			7	–	1	–	0
Little Creek			–			7	–	2	–	0
Santa Barbara Marines			–			7	–	3	–	1
Camp Lee			–			7	–	4	–	0
Camp Beale			–			6	–	1	–	2
Farragut NTS			–			6	–	2	–	0
Eastern Flying Training Command			–			6	–	3	–	1
Great Lakes Navy			–			6	–	4	–	1
Hondo AAF			–			6	–	4	–	1
South Camp Hood			–			5	–	2	–	0
Camp Peary			–			5	–	3	–	0
Bainbridge			–			5	–	4	–	0
Fort Benning			–			5	–	4	–	1
Fort Warren			–			5	–	7	–	0
Fort McClellan			–			4	–	2	–	0
San Diego NTS			–			4	–	2	–	0
Atlantic City NAS			–			4	–	2	–	1
Minter Field			–			4	–	2	–	1
Williams Field			–			4	–	4	–	0
Stockton AAF			–			4	–	5	–	2
Barksdale Field			–			4	–	7	–	0
Fort Pierce			–			4	–	9	–	0
Amarillo AAF			–			3	–	1	–	0
Olathe NAS			–			3	–	2	–	0
Albany Navy			–			3	–	3	–	1
Camp Detrick			–			3	–	4	–	0
Kearney AAF			–			3	–	4	–	0
Bergstrom Field			–			3	–	5	–	1
Keesler Field			–			3	–	6	–	1
Melville PT Boats			–			2	–	1	–	0
Great Bend AAF			–			2	–	4	–	0
Saint Mary's Pre-Flight			–			2	–	4	–	1
Gulfport AAF			–			2	–	5	–	0
Pensacola NAS			–			2	–	7	–	1
Squantum NAS			–			1	–	1	–	0
Camp Blanding			–			1	–	2	–	0
Luke Field			–			1	–	2	–	0
Miami NAS			–			1	–	2	–	0
Miami NTC			–			1	–	3	–	0
NSB New London			–			1	–	3	–	0
Oceana NAS			–			1	–	3	–	0
Fort Riley			–			1	–	4	–	0
Lake Charles AAF			–			1	–	4	–	0
Ellington Field			–			1	–	4	–	1
Cherry Point Marines			–			1	–	8	–	0
Dalhart AAF			–			0	–	3	–	0
Homestead AAB			–			0	–	3	–	0
Fort Monroe			–			0	–	7	–	0
+ – Conference co-champions

The 1945 Camp Detrick Army Chemists football team represented the United States Army's Camp Detrick in Frederick, Maryland during the 1945 college football season. The Army Chemists compiled a record of 3–4.

Camp Detrick ranked 242nd among the nation's college and service teams in the final Litkenhous Ratings.

== Schedule ==
Date	Time	Opponent	Site	Result	Attendance	Source
October 6	2:30 p.m.	at Fort Monroe	Fort Monroe parade ground; Hampton, VA	W 7–0		
October 13		at Camp Lee	Nowak Field; Camp Lee, VA	L 6–33	8,000–9,500	
October 20		Bullis School	Frederick, MD	L 0–7		
October 28	2:30 p.m.	at Bainbridge	Tome Stadium; Bainbridge, MD	L 0–40	7,000	
November 9		at Aberdeen Proving Ground	Aberdeen, MD	W 7–13		
November 16		Fort Monroe	Frederick, MD	W 21–0		
November 24		Aberdeen Proving Ground	Frederick, MD	L 25–31		
All times are in Eastern time
