= 1945 Air Transport Command Rockets football team =

American college football season

1945 Air Transport Command Rockets football
- Conference: Army Air Forces League
- Record: 6–3–2 (2–3–1 AAF League)
- Head coach: Dick Emerson (1st season; first 2 games); Eddie Davison (acting, final 9 games)
- Home stadium: Dudley Field

1945 military service football records
	Conf.					Overall
Team	W		L		T	W		L		T
Army Air Forces League
Third Air Force +	4	–	1	–	1	7	–	2	–	1
AAF Training Command +	4	–	1	–	1	8	–	3	–	1
Fourth Air Force	3	–	2	–	1	6	–	3	–	1
First Air Force	2	–	2	–	2	3	–	2	–	3
Air Transport Command	2	–	3	–	1	6	–	3	–	2
Personnel Distribution Command	2	–	4	–	0	6	–	5	–	0
Second Air Force	1	–	5	–	0	3	–	7	–	0
Independents
Fleet City			–			11	–	0	–	1
Jacksonville NAS			–			9	–	2	–	0
Hutchinson NAS			–			8	–	0	–	0
Selman Field			–			8	–	1	–	0
El Toro Marines			–			8	–	2	–	0
Corpus Christi NAS			–			7	–	1	–	0
North Camp Hood			–			7	–	1	–	0
Little Creek			–			7	–	2	–	0
Santa Barbara Marines			–			7	–	3	–	1
Camp Lee			–			7	–	4	–	0
Camp Beale			–			6	–	1	–	2
Farragut NTS			–			6	–	2	–	0
Eastern Flying Training Command			–			6	–	3	–	1
Great Lakes Navy			–			6	–	4	–	1
Hondo AAF			–			6	–	4	–	1
South Camp Hood			–			5	–	2	–	0
Camp Peary			–			5	–	3	–	0
Bainbridge			–			5	–	4	–	0
Fort Benning			–			5	–	4	–	1
Fort Warren			–			5	–	7	–	0
Fort McClellan			–			4	–	2	–	0
San Diego NTS			–			4	–	2	–	0
Atlantic City NAS			–			4	–	2	–	1
Minter Field			–			4	–	2	–	1
Williams Field			–			4	–	4	–	0
Stockton AAF			–			4	–	5	–	2
Barksdale Field			–			4	–	7	–	0
Fort Pierce			–			4	–	9	–	0
Amarillo AAF			–			3	–	1	–	0
Olathe NAS			–			3	–	2	–	0
Albany Navy			–			3	–	3	–	1
Camp Detrick			–			3	–	4	–	0
Kearney AAF			–			3	–	4	–	0
Bergstrom Field			–			3	–	5	–	1
Keesler Field			–			3	–	6	–	1
Melville PT Boats			–			2	–	1	–	0
Great Bend AAF			–			2	–	4	–	0
Saint Mary's Pre-Flight			–			2	–	4	–	1
Gulfport AAF			–			2	–	5	–	0
Pensacola NAS			–			2	–	7	–	1
Squantum NAS			–			1	–	1	–	0
Camp Blanding			–			1	–	2	–	0
Luke Field			–			1	–	2	–	0
Miami NAS			–			1	–	2	–	0
Miami NTC			–			1	–	3	–	0
NSB New London			–			1	–	3	–	0
Oceana NAS			–			1	–	3	–	0
Fort Riley			–			1	–	4	–	0
Lake Charles AAF			–			1	–	4	–	0
Ellington Field			–			1	–	4	–	1
Cherry Point Marines			–			1	–	8	–	0
Dalhart AAF			–			0	–	3	–	0
Homestead AAB			–			0	–	3	–	0
Fort Monroe			–			0	–	7	–	0
+ – Conference co-champions

The 1945 Air Transport Command Rockets football team represented the Air Transport Command (ATC) based in Nashville, Tennessee during the 1945 college football season. The Rockets competed in the Army Air Forces League (AAF League) with six others teams from the United States Army Air Forces. The Rockets compiled an overall record of 6–3–2 with a mark of 2–3–1 in league play, placing fifth in the AAF League. Captain Dick Emerson of Portland, Oregon served as the team's head coach at the outset of the season. He was transferred by the Army in late September and succeeded by Captain Eddie Davison of Plainfield, New Jersey as acting coach. Davison had played football at Saint Louis University and was line coach for the Rockets.

The ATC Rockets were ranked 18th among the nation's college and service teams in the final Litkenhous Ratings.

== Schedule ==
Date	Time	Opponent	Site	Result	Attendance	Source
September 15	2:30 p.m.	Fort Pierce*	Dudley Field; Nashville, TN	W 13–10	7,000	
September 22		First Air Force*	Dudley Field; Nashville, TN	T 7–7		
September 30		vs. Fourth Air Force	Cotton Bowl; Dallas, TX	L 14–21	5,000	
October 7	1:30 p.m.	at Personnel Distribution Command	duPont Manual Stadium; Louisville, KY	W 15–8	6,000	
October 13	2:30 p.m.	AAF Training Command	Dudley Field; Nashville, TN	L 0–14	7,500	
October 21		vs. First Air Force	Mackenzie Field; Holyoke, MA	T 7–7	10,000	
October 28	1:00 p.m.	vs. Cherry Point Marines*	Griffith Stadium; Washington, DC	W 27–0	20,000	
November 4		at Bainbridge*	Tome Stadium; Bainbridge, MD	W 24–6		
November 11	2:00 p.m.	vs. Second Air Force	Memorial Stadium; Lincoln, NE	W 15–0	15,000	
November 18		at Fort Benning*	Doughboy Stadium; Fort Benning, GA	W 23–7	12,000	
November 24	2:00 p.m.	Third Air Force	Dudley Field; Nashville, TN	L 6–15	2,800–4,000	
*Non-conference game; All times are in Central time
