= 1945 Keesler Field Fliers football team =

American college football season

1945 Keesler Field Fliers football
- Conference: Independent
- Record: 3–6–1
- Head coach: James Coffis
- Home stadium: Flier Field

1945 military service football records
	Conf.					Overall
Team	W		L		T	W		L		T
Army Air Forces League
Third Air Force +	4	–	1	–	1	7	–	2	–	1
AAF Training Command +	4	–	1	–	1	8	–	3	–	1
Fourth Air Force	3	–	2	–	1	6	–	3	–	1
First Air Force	2	–	2	–	2	3	–	2	–	3
Air Transport Command	2	–	3	–	1	6	–	3	–	2
Personnel Distribution Command	2	–	4	–	0	6	–	5	–	0
Second Air Force	1	–	5	–	0	3	–	7	–	0
Independents
Fleet City			–			11	–	0	–	1
Jacksonville NAS			–			9	–	2	–	0
Hutchinson NAS			–			8	–	0	–	0
Selman Field			–			8	–	1	–	0
El Toro Marines			–			8	–	2	–	0
Corpus Christi NAS			–			7	–	1	–	0
North Camp Hood			–			7	–	1	–	0
Little Creek			–			7	–	2	–	0
Santa Barbara Marines			–			7	–	3	–	1
Camp Lee			–			7	–	4	–	0
Camp Beale			–			6	–	1	–	2
Farragut NTS			–			6	–	2	–	0
Eastern Flying Training Command			–			6	–	3	–	1
Great Lakes Navy			–			6	–	4	–	1
Hondo AAF			–			6	–	4	–	1
South Camp Hood			–			5	–	2	–	0
Camp Peary			–			5	–	3	–	0
Bainbridge			–			5	–	4	–	0
Fort Benning			–			5	–	4	–	1
Fort Warren			–			5	–	7	–	0
Fort McClellan			–			4	–	2	–	0
San Diego NTS			–			4	–	2	–	0
Atlantic City NAS			–			4	–	2	–	1
Minter Field			–			4	–	2	–	1
Williams Field			–			4	–	4	–	0
Stockton AAF			–			4	–	5	–	2
Barksdale Field			–			4	–	7	–	0
Fort Pierce			–			4	–	9	–	0
Amarillo AAF			–			3	–	1	–	0
Olathe NAS			–			3	–	2	–	0
Albany Navy			–			3	–	3	–	1
Camp Detrick			–			3	–	4	–	0
Kearney AAF			–			3	–	4	–	0
Bergstrom Field			–			3	–	5	–	1
Keesler Field			–			3	–	6	–	1
Melville PT Boats			–			2	–	1	–	0
Great Bend AAF			–			2	–	4	–	0
Saint Mary's Pre-Flight			–			2	–	4	–	1
Gulfport AAF			–			2	–	5	–	0
Pensacola NAS			–			2	–	7	–	1
Squantum NAS			–			1	–	1	–	0
Camp Blanding			–			1	–	2	–	0
Luke Field			–			1	–	2	–	0
Miami NAS			–			1	–	2	–	0
Miami NTC			–			1	–	3	–	0
NSB New London			–			1	–	3	–	0
Oceana NAS			–			1	–	3	–	0
Fort Riley			–			1	–	4	–	0
Lake Charles AAF			–			1	–	4	–	0
Ellington Field			–			1	–	4	–	1
Cherry Point Marines			–			1	–	8	–	0
Dalhart AAF			–			0	–	3	–	0
Homestead AAB			–			0	–	3	–	0
Fort Monroe			–			0	–	7	–	0
+ – Conference co-champions

The 1945 Keesler Field Fliers football team represented the United States Army Air Forces's Keesler Field during the 1945 college football season. Led by head coach James Coffis, the Fliers compiled a 3–6–1 record.

The Keesler Field Fliers were ranked 49th among the nation's college and service teams in the final Litkenhous Ratings.

== Schedule ==
Date	Opponent	Site	Result	Attendance	Source
September 23	at AAF Training Command	Farrington Field; Fort Worth, TX	L 0–29	15,000	
September 29	Alabama	Flier Field; Biloxi, MS	L 0–21	14,000	
October 7	vs. Second Air Force	Howard Wood Field; Sioux Falls, SD	L 13–28	7,000	
October 14	Fort Benning	Flier Field; Biloxi, MS	L 7–26		
October 21	at Fort Benning	Doughboy Stadium; Fort Benning, GA	T 0–0	16,000	
November 4	Gulfport AAF	Flier Field; Biloxi, MS	W 14–0	8,000	
November 11	at Third Air Force	Phillips Field; Tampa, FL	L 0–42	6,500	
November 18	Eastern Flying Training Command	Flier Field; Biloxi, MS	W 14–7	12,000	
November 25	at Fort Pierce	Fort Pierce, FL	L 7–21	5,000	
December 2	Cherry Point Marines	Flier Field; Biloxi, MS	W 41–0	13,000	
