= 1945 Pensacola Naval Air Station Goslings football team =

American college football season

1945 Pensacola Naval Air Station Goslings football
- Conference: Independent
- Record: 2–7–1
- Head coach: Curt Youel (1st season)
- Home stadium: Air Station Field

1945 military service football records
	Conf.					Overall
Team	W		L		T	W		L		T
Army Air Forces League
Third Air Force +	4	–	1	–	1	7	–	2	–	1
AAF Training Command +	4	–	1	–	1	8	–	3	–	1
Fourth Air Force	3	–	2	–	1	6	–	3	–	1
First Air Force	2	–	2	–	2	3	–	2	–	3
Air Transport Command	2	–	3	–	1	6	–	3	–	2
Personnel Distribution Command	2	–	4	–	0	6	–	5	–	0
Second Air Force	1	–	5	–	0	3	–	7	–	0
Independents
Fleet City			–			11	–	0	–	1
Jacksonville NAS			–			9	–	2	–	0
Hutchinson NAS			–			8	–	0	–	0
Selman Field			–			8	–	1	–	0
El Toro Marines			–			8	–	2	–	0
Corpus Christi NAS			–			7	–	1	–	0
North Camp Hood			–			7	–	1	–	0
Little Creek			–			7	–	2	–	0
Santa Barbara Marines			–			7	–	3	–	1
Camp Lee			–			7	–	4	–	0
Camp Beale			–			6	–	1	–	2
Farragut NTS			–			6	–	2	–	0
Eastern Flying Training Command			–			6	–	3	–	1
Great Lakes Navy			–			6	–	4	–	1
Hondo AAF			–			6	–	4	–	1
South Camp Hood			–			5	–	2	–	0
Camp Peary			–			5	–	3	–	0
Bainbridge			–			5	–	4	–	0
Fort Benning			–			5	–	4	–	1
Fort Warren			–			5	–	7	–	0
Fort McClellan			–			4	–	2	–	0
San Diego NTS			–			4	–	2	–	0
Atlantic City NAS			–			4	–	2	–	1
Minter Field			–			4	–	2	–	1
Williams Field			–			4	–	4	–	0
Stockton AAF			–			4	–	5	–	2
Barksdale Field			–			4	–	7	–	0
Fort Pierce			–			4	–	9	–	0
Amarillo AAF			–			3	–	1	–	0
Olathe NAS			–			3	–	2	–	0
Albany Navy			–			3	–	3	–	1
Camp Detrick			–			3	–	4	–	0
Kearney AAF			–			3	–	4	–	0
Bergstrom Field			–			3	–	5	–	1
Keesler Field			–			3	–	6	–	1
Melville PT Boats			–			2	–	1	–	0
Great Bend AAF			–			2	–	4	–	0
Saint Mary's Pre-Flight			–			2	–	4	–	1
Gulfport AAF			–			2	–	5	–	0
Pensacola NAS			–			2	–	7	–	1
Squantum NAS			–			1	–	1	–	0
Camp Blanding			–			1	–	2	–	0
Luke Field			–			1	–	2	–	0
Miami NAS			–			1	–	2	–	0
Miami NTC			–			1	–	3	–	0
NSB New London			–			1	–	3	–	0
Oceana NAS			–			1	–	3	–	0
Fort Riley			–			1	–	4	–	0
Lake Charles AAF			–			1	–	4	–	0
Ellington Field			–			1	–	4	–	1
Cherry Point Marines			–			1	–	8	–	0
Dalhart AAF			–			0	–	3	–	0
Homestead AAB			–			0	–	3	–	0
Fort Monroe			–			0	–	7	–	0
+ – Conference co-champions

The 1945 Pensacola Naval Air Station Goslings football team represented the Pensacola Naval Air Station during the 1945 college football season. Led by head coach Curt Youel, the Goslings compiled a 2–7–1 record.

== Schedule ==
Date	Opponent	Site	Result	Attendance	Source
October 6	Gulfport AAF	Air Station Field; Pensacola, FL	W 20–7		
October 13	at Clemson	Memorial Stadium; Clemson, SC	L 6–7	5,000	
October 20	at Corpus Christi NAS	Buccaneer Stadium; Corpus Christi, TX	L 0–39	14,000	
October 28	Corpus Christi NAS	Air Station Field; Pensacola, FL	L 6–26	10,000	
November 4	at Eastern Flying Training Command	Cramton Bowl; Montgomery, AL	L 6–19	4,000	
November 11	at Gulfport AAF	Gulfport, MS	W 26–7	3,500	
November 17	Jacksonville NAS	Air Station Field; Pensacola, FL	L 0–48	8,000	
November 24	at No. 3 Alabama	Denny Stadium; Tuscaloosa, AL	L 6–55	7,500	
December 1	at Jacksonville NAS	Municipal Stadium; Jacksonville, FL	L 0–48	5,000	
December 8	Eastern Flying Training Command	Air Station Field; Pensacola, FL	T 7–7	8,000	
Rankings from AP Poll released prior to the game
