= 1945 Squantum NAS football team =

1945 Naval Air Station Squantum football
- Conference: Independent
- Record: 1–1
- Head coach: Sterling Painter (1st season)

1945 military service football records
| | Conf. | | | | | Overall |
| Team | W | | L | | T | W | | L | | T |
|---|---|---|---|---|---|---|---|---|---|---|
Army Air Forces League
| Third Air Force + | 4 | – | 1 | – | 1 | 7 | – | 2 | – | 1 |
| AAF Training Command + | 4 | – | 1 | – | 1 | 8 | – | 3 | – | 1 |
| Fourth Air Force | 3 | – | 2 | – | 1 | 6 | – | 3 | – | 1 |
| First Air Force | 2 | – | 2 | – | 2 | 3 | – | 2 | – | 3 |
| Air Transport Command | 2 | – | 3 | – | 1 | 6 | – | 3 | – | 2 |
| Personnel Distribution Command | 2 | – | 4 | – | 0 | 6 | – | 5 | – | 0 |
| Second Air Force | 1 | – | 5 | – | 0 | 3 | – | 7 | – | 0 |
Independents
| Fleet City | | | – | | | 11 | – | 0 | – | 1 |
| Jacksonville NAS | | | – | | | 9 | – | 2 | – | 0 |
| Hutchinson NAS | | | – | | | 8 | – | 0 | – | 0 |
| Selman Field | | | – | | | 8 | – | 1 | – | 0 |
| El Toro Marines | | | – | | | 8 | – | 2 | – | 0 |
| Corpus Christi NAS | | | – | | | 7 | – | 1 | – | 0 |
| North Camp Hood | | | – | | | 7 | – | 1 | – | 0 |
| Little Creek | | | – | | | 7 | – | 2 | – | 0 |
| Santa Barbara Marines | | | – | | | 7 | – | 3 | – | 1 |
| Camp Lee | | | – | | | 7 | – | 4 | – | 0 |
| Camp Beale | | | – | | | 6 | – | 1 | – | 2 |
| Farragut NTS | | | – | | | 6 | – | 2 | – | 0 |
| Eastern Flying Training Command | | | – | | | 6 | – | 3 | – | 1 |
| Great Lakes Navy | | | – | | | 6 | – | 4 | – | 1 |
| Hondo AAF | | | – | | | 6 | – | 4 | – | 1 |
| South Camp Hood | | | – | | | 5 | – | 2 | – | 0 |
| Camp Peary | | | – | | | 5 | – | 3 | – | 0 |
| Bainbridge | | | – | | | 5 | – | 4 | – | 0 |
| Fort Benning | | | – | | | 5 | – | 4 | – | 1 |
| Fort Warren | | | – | | | 5 | – | 7 | – | 0 |
| Fort McClellan | | | – | | | 4 | – | 2 | – | 0 |
| San Diego NTS | | | – | | | 4 | – | 2 | – | 0 |
| Atlantic City NAS | | | – | | | 4 | – | 2 | – | 1 |
| Minter Field | | | – | | | 4 | – | 2 | – | 1 |
| Williams Field | | | – | | | 4 | – | 4 | – | 0 |
| Stockton AAF | | | – | | | 4 | – | 5 | – | 2 |
| Barksdale Field | | | – | | | 4 | – | 7 | – | 0 |
| Fort Pierce | | | – | | | 4 | – | 9 | – | 0 |
| Amarillo AAF | | | – | | | 3 | – | 1 | – | 0 |
| Olathe NAS | | | – | | | 3 | – | 2 | – | 0 |
| Albany Navy | | | – | | | 3 | – | 3 | – | 1 |
| Camp Detrick | | | – | | | 3 | – | 4 | – | 0 |
| Kearney AAF | | | – | | | 3 | – | 4 | – | 0 |
| Bergstrom Field | | | – | | | 3 | – | 5 | – | 1 |
| Keesler Field | | | – | | | 3 | – | 6 | – | 1 |
| Melville PT Boats | | | – | | | 2 | – | 1 | – | 0 |
| Great Bend AAF | | | – | | | 2 | – | 4 | – | 0 |
| Saint Mary's Pre-Flight | | | – | | | 2 | – | 4 | – | 1 |
| Gulfport AAF | | | – | | | 2 | – | 5 | – | 0 |
| Pensacola NAS | | | – | | | 2 | – | 7 | – | 1 |
| Squantum NAS | | | – | | | 1 | – | 1 | – | 0 |
| Camp Blanding | | | – | | | 1 | – | 2 | – | 0 |
| Luke Field | | | – | | | 1 | – | 2 | – | 0 |
| Miami NAS | | | – | | | 1 | – | 2 | – | 0 |
| Miami NTC | | | – | | | 1 | – | 3 | – | 0 |
| NSB New London | | | – | | | 1 | – | 3 | – | 0 |
| Oceana NAS | | | – | | | 1 | – | 3 | – | 0 |
| Fort Riley | | | – | | | 1 | – | 4 | – | 0 |
| Lake Charles AAF | | | – | | | 1 | – | 4 | – | 0 |
| Ellington Field | | | – | | | 1 | – | 4 | – | 1 |
| Cherry Point Marines | | | – | | | 1 | – | 8 | – | 0 |
| Dalhart AAF | | | – | | | 0 | – | 3 | – | 0 |
| Homestead AAB | | | – | | | 0 | – | 3 | – | 0 |
| Fort Monroe | | | – | | | 0 | – | 7 | – | 0 |
+ – Conference co-champions

The 1945 Squantum NAS football team represented the Naval Air Station Squantum during the 1945 college football season. The team was led by player-coach Sterling Painter, who had played at the Bloomsburg State Teachers College and quarterbacked by former Notre Dame QB Don Elser.

== Schedule ==
| Date | Opponent | Site | Result | Attendance | Source |
|---|---|---|---|---|---|
| September 29 | at Boston College | Alumni Field; Chestnut Hill, MA | L 0–13 | | |
| October 27 | at Boston University | Nickerson Field; Boston, MA | W 21–3 | 500 | |
