= 1945 Third Air Force Gremlins football team =

American college football season

1945 Third Air Force Gremlins football

AAF League co-champion
- Conference: Army Air Forces League
- Record: 7–2–1 (4–1–1 AAF League)
- Head coach: J. Quinn Decker (2nd season)
- Captain: Chet Lipka
- Home stadium: Phillips Field

1945 military service football records
	Conf.					Overall
Team	W		L		T	W		L		T
Army Air Forces League
Third Air Force +	4	–	1	–	1	7	–	2	–	1
AAF Training Command +	4	–	1	–	1	8	–	3	–	1
Fourth Air Force	3	–	2	–	1	6	–	3	–	1
First Air Force	2	–	2	–	2	3	–	2	–	3
Air Transport Command	2	–	3	–	1	6	–	3	–	2
Personnel Distribution Command	2	–	4	–	0	6	–	5	–	0
Second Air Force	1	–	5	–	0	3	–	7	–	0
Independents
Fleet City			–			11	–	0	–	1
Jacksonville NAS			–			9	–	2	–	0
Hutchinson NAS			–			8	–	0	–	0
Selman Field			–			8	–	1	–	0
El Toro Marines			–			8	–	2	–	0
Corpus Christi NAS			–			7	–	1	–	0
North Camp Hood			–			7	–	1	–	0
Little Creek			–			7	–	2	–	0
Santa Barbara Marines			–			7	–	3	–	1
Camp Lee			–			7	–	4	–	0
Camp Beale			–			6	–	1	–	2
Farragut NTS			–			6	–	2	–	0
Eastern Flying Training Command			–			6	–	3	–	1
Great Lakes Navy			–			6	–	4	–	1
Hondo AAF			–			6	–	4	–	1
South Camp Hood			–			5	–	2	–	0
Camp Peary			–			5	–	3	–	0
Bainbridge			–			5	–	4	–	0
Fort Benning			–			5	–	4	–	1
Fort Warren			–			5	–	7	–	0
Fort McClellan			–			4	–	2	–	0
San Diego NTS			–			4	–	2	–	0
Atlantic City NAS			–			4	–	2	–	1
Minter Field			–			4	–	2	–	1
Williams Field			–			4	–	4	–	0
Stockton AAF			–			4	–	5	–	2
Barksdale Field			–			4	–	7	–	0
Fort Pierce			–			4	–	9	–	0
Amarillo AAF			–			3	–	1	–	0
Olathe NAS			–			3	–	2	–	0
Albany Navy			–			3	–	3	–	1
Camp Detrick			–			3	–	4	–	0
Kearney AAF			–			3	–	4	–	0
Bergstrom Field			–			3	–	5	–	1
Keesler Field			–			3	–	6	–	1
Melville PT Boats			–			2	–	1	–	0
Great Bend AAF			–			2	–	4	–	0
Saint Mary's Pre-Flight			–			2	–	4	–	1
Gulfport AAF			–			2	–	5	–	0
Pensacola NAS			–			2	–	7	–	1
Squantum NAS			–			1	–	1	–	0
Camp Blanding			–			1	–	2	–	0
Luke Field			–			1	–	2	–	0
Miami NAS			–			1	–	2	–	0
Miami NTC			–			1	–	3	–	0
NSB New London			–			1	–	3	–	0
Oceana NAS			–			1	–	3	–	0
Fort Riley			–			1	–	4	–	0
Lake Charles AAF			–			1	–	4	–	0
Ellington Field			–			1	–	4	–	1
Cherry Point Marines			–			1	–	8	–	0
Dalhart AAF			–			0	–	3	–	0
Homestead AAB			–			0	–	3	–	0
Fort Monroe			–			0	–	7	–	0
+ – Conference co-champions

The 1945 Third Air Force Gremlins football team represented the Third Air Force based in Tampa, Florida during the 1945 college football season. The Gremlins competed in the Army Air Forces League (AAF League) with six others teams from the United States Army Air Forces. Led by second-year head coach J. Quinn Decker, the Gremlins compiled an overall record of 7–2–1 with a mark of 4–1–1 in league play, sharing the AAF League title with Army Air Forces Training Command Skymasters.

The Third Air Force Gremlins ranked 11th among the nation's college and service teams in the final Litkenhous Ratings.

== Schedule ==
Date	Time	Opponent	Site	Result	Attendance	Source
September 23	2:30 p.m.	Personnel Distribution Command	Phillips Field; Tampa, FL	W 27–9	12,000	
September 30	2:30 p.m.	Miami NTC*	Phillips Field; Tampa, FL	W 39–0	9,000	
October 7	2:30 p.m.	vs. First Air Force	Carolina Stadium; Columbia, SC	W 19–0		
October 14		at Cherry Point Marines*	Cherry Point, NC	W 20–0	8,000	
October 21		Fort Pierce*	Phillips Field; Tampa, FL	L 12–26	9,000	
November 4		vs. Second Air Force	DU Stadium; Denver, CO	W 33–0	15,000	
November 11		Keesler Field*	Phillips Field; Tampa, FL	W 42–0	6,500	
November 18	2:30 p.m.	AAF Training Command	Phillips Field; Tampa, FL	T 7–7	10,000	
November 24	3:00 p.m.	at Air Transport Command	Dudley Field; Nashville, TN	W 15–6	2,800–4,000	
December 2	5:00 p.m.	at Fourth Air Force	Los Angeles Memorial Coliseum; Los Angeles, CA	L 7–10	10,000–12,000	
*Non-conference game; All times are in Eastern time
