= 1945 South Camp Hood Doughboys football team =

American college football season

1945 South Camp Hood Doughboys football
- Conference: Independent
- Record: 5–2
- Head coach: Jerry Helmstetter (1st season)

1945 military service football records
	Conf.					Overall
Team	W		L		T	W		L		T
Army Air Forces League
Third Air Force +	4	–	1	–	1	7	–	2	–	1
AAF Training Command +	4	–	1	–	1	8	–	3	–	1
Fourth Air Force	3	–	2	–	1	6	–	3	–	1
First Air Force	2	–	2	–	2	3	–	2	–	3
Air Transport Command	2	–	3	–	1	6	–	3	–	2
Personnel Distribution Command	2	–	4	–	0	6	–	5	–	0
Second Air Force	1	–	5	–	0	3	–	7	–	0
Independents
Fleet City			–			11	–	0	–	1
Jacksonville NAS			–			9	–	2	–	0
Hutchinson NAS			–			8	–	0	–	0
Selman Field			–			8	–	1	–	0
El Toro Marines			–			8	–	2	–	0
Corpus Christi NAS			–			7	–	1	–	0
North Camp Hood			–			7	–	1	–	0
Little Creek			–			7	–	2	–	0
Santa Barbara Marines			–			7	–	3	–	1
Camp Lee			–			7	–	4	–	0
Camp Beale			–			6	–	1	–	2
Farragut NTS			–			6	–	2	–	0
Eastern Flying Training Command			–			6	–	3	–	1
Great Lakes Navy			–			6	–	4	–	1
Hondo AAF			–			6	–	4	–	1
South Camp Hood			–			5	–	2	–	0
Camp Peary			–			5	–	3	–	0
Bainbridge			–			5	–	4	–	0
Fort Benning			–			5	–	4	–	1
Fort Warren			–			5	–	7	–	0
Fort McClellan			–			4	–	2	–	0
San Diego NTS			–			4	–	2	–	0
Atlantic City NAS			–			4	–	2	–	1
Minter Field			–			4	–	2	–	1
Williams Field			–			4	–	4	–	0
Stockton AAF			–			4	–	5	–	2
Barksdale Field			–			4	–	7	–	0
Fort Pierce			–			4	–	9	–	0
Amarillo AAF			–			3	–	1	–	0
Olathe NAS			–			3	–	2	–	0
Albany Navy			–			3	–	3	–	1
Camp Detrick			–			3	–	4	–	0
Kearney AAF			–			3	–	4	–	0
Bergstrom Field			–			3	–	5	–	1
Keesler Field			–			3	–	6	–	1
Melville PT Boats			–			2	–	1	–	0
Great Bend AAF			–			2	–	4	–	0
Saint Mary's Pre-Flight			–			2	–	4	–	1
Gulfport AAF			–			2	–	5	–	0
Pensacola NAS			–			2	–	7	–	1
Squantum NAS			–			1	–	1	–	0
Camp Blanding			–			1	–	2	–	0
Luke Field			–			1	–	2	–	0
Miami NAS			–			1	–	2	–	0
Miami NTC			–			1	–	3	–	0
NSB New London			–			1	–	3	–	0
Oceana NAS			–			1	–	3	–	0
Fort Riley			–			1	–	4	–	0
Lake Charles AAF			–			1	–	4	–	0
Ellington Field			–			1	–	4	–	1
Cherry Point Marines			–			1	–	8	–	0
Dalhart AAF			–			0	–	3	–	0
Homestead AAB			–			0	–	3	–	0
Fort Monroe			–			0	–	7	–	0
+ – Conference co-champions

The 1945 South Camp Hood Doughboys football team represented Camp Hood in Texas during the 1945 college football season. Led by head coach Jerry Helmstetter, the Doughboys compiled a record of 5–2. J. B. Tracey was the team's line coach.

== Schedule ==
Date	Time	Opponent	Site	Result	Source
October 12		at John Tarleton	Stephenville, TX	W 20–0	
October 19		North Camp Hood	Gatesville, TX	L 6–21	
October 27		Fort Sill	Camp Hood, TX	W 24–0	
November 3	8:00 p.m.	at Bergstrom Field	House Park; Austin, TX	L 13–18	
November 9		at Camp Swift	Killeen, TX	W 21–6	
November 18		at Fort Sill	Fort Sill, OK	W 33–0	
November 25		at Great Bend AAF	Great Bend, KS	W 20–7	
All times are in Central time
