= 1945 Hutchinson Naval Air Station Gobs football team =

American college football season

1945 Hutchinson Naval Air Station Gobs football
- Conference: Independent
- Record: 8–0
- Head coach: Ken Gleason (1st season)

1945 military service football records
	Conf.					Overall
Team	W		L		T	W		L		T
Army Air Forces League
Third Air Force +	4	–	1	–	1	7	–	2	–	1
AAF Training Command +	4	–	1	–	1	8	–	3	–	1
Fourth Air Force	3	–	2	–	1	6	–	3	–	1
First Air Force	2	–	2	–	2	3	–	2	–	3
Air Transport Command	2	–	3	–	1	6	–	3	–	2
Personnel Distribution Command	2	–	4	–	0	6	–	5	–	0
Second Air Force	1	–	5	–	0	3	–	7	–	0
Independents
Fleet City			–			11	–	0	–	1
Jacksonville NAS			–			9	–	2	–	0
Hutchinson NAS			–			8	–	0	–	0
Selman Field			–			8	–	1	–	0
El Toro Marines			–			8	–	2	–	0
Corpus Christi NAS			–			7	–	1	–	0
North Camp Hood			–			7	–	1	–	0
Little Creek			–			7	–	2	–	0
Santa Barbara Marines			–			7	–	3	–	1
Camp Lee			–			7	–	4	–	0
Camp Beale			–			6	–	1	–	2
Farragut NTS			–			6	–	2	–	0
Eastern Flying Training Command			–			6	–	3	–	1
Great Lakes Navy			–			6	–	4	–	1
Hondo AAF			–			6	–	4	–	1
South Camp Hood			–			5	–	2	–	0
Camp Peary			–			5	–	3	–	0
Bainbridge			–			5	–	4	–	0
Fort Benning			–			5	–	4	–	1
Fort Warren			–			5	–	7	–	0
Fort McClellan			–			4	–	2	–	0
San Diego NTS			–			4	–	2	–	0
Atlantic City NAS			–			4	–	2	–	1
Minter Field			–			4	–	2	–	1
Williams Field			–			4	–	4	–	0
Stockton AAF			–			4	–	5	–	2
Barksdale Field			–			4	–	7	–	0
Fort Pierce			–			4	–	9	–	0
Amarillo AAF			–			3	–	1	–	0
Olathe NAS			–			3	–	2	–	0
Albany Navy			–			3	–	3	–	1
Camp Detrick			–			3	–	4	–	0
Kearney AAF			–			3	–	4	–	0
Bergstrom Field			–			3	–	5	–	1
Keesler Field			–			3	–	6	–	1
Melville PT Boats			–			2	–	1	–	0
Great Bend AAF			–			2	–	4	–	0
Saint Mary's Pre-Flight			–			2	–	4	–	1
Gulfport AAF			–			2	–	5	–	0
Pensacola NAS			–			2	–	7	–	1
Squantum NAS			–			1	–	1	–	0
Camp Blanding			–			1	–	2	–	0
Luke Field			–			1	–	2	–	0
Miami NAS			–			1	–	2	–	0
Miami NTC			–			1	–	3	–	0
NSB New London			–			1	–	3	–	0
Oceana NAS			–			1	–	3	–	0
Fort Riley			–			1	–	4	–	0
Lake Charles AAF			–			1	–	4	–	0
Ellington Field			–			1	–	4	–	1
Cherry Point Marines			–			1	–	8	–	0
Dalhart AAF			–			0	–	3	–	0
Homestead AAB			–			0	–	3	–	0
Fort Monroe			–			0	–	7	–	0
+ – Conference co-champions

The 1945 Olathe Naval Air Station Gobs football team was an American football team that represented the United States Navy's Naval Air Station Hutchinson (Hutchinson NAS), near Hutchinson, Kansas, during the 1945 college football season. Led by head coach Ken Gleason, the Gobs compiled a record of 8–0. This was the first football team fielded by Hutchinson NAS. Lieutenant Gleason's coaching staff consisted of Lieutenant Frank Kirkleski as backfield coach, Lieutenant George Gale as line coach, and Lieutenant Prentice Gudgeon as advisory coach.

Hutchinson NAS was ranked 50th among the nation's college and service teams in the final Litkenhous Ratings.

== Schedule ==
Date	Opponent	Site	Result	Source
September 29	at Missouri B team	Columbia, MO	W 33–7	
October 6	Great Bend AAF		W 20–6	
October 13	Olathe NAS	Hutchinson, KS	W 15–0	
October 20	Sterling		W 54–0	
October 27	Fort Riley		W 39–0	
November 10	Fort Sill	Hutchinson, KS	W 30–0	
November 17	at Pittsburg State	Pittsburg, KS	W 39–0	
November 24	North Camp Hood	Hutchinson, KS	W 46–7	
November 29	Fort Sill	Fort Sill, OK	cancelled	
