= 1945 Bainbridge Commodores football team =

American college football season

1945 Bainbridge Commodores football
- Conference: Independent
- Record: 5–4
- Head coach: Paul Pierce (1st season)
- Home stadium: Tome Stadium

1945 military service football records
	Conf.					Overall
Team	W		L		T	W		L		T
Army Air Forces League
Third Air Force +	4	–	1	–	1	7	–	2	–	1
AAF Training Command +	4	–	1	–	1	8	–	3	–	1
Fourth Air Force	3	–	2	–	1	6	–	3	–	1
First Air Force	2	–	2	–	2	3	–	2	–	3
Air Transport Command	2	–	3	–	1	6	–	3	–	2
Personnel Distribution Command	2	–	4	–	0	6	–	5	–	0
Second Air Force	1	–	5	–	0	3	–	7	–	0
Independents
Fleet City			–			11	–	0	–	1
Jacksonville NAS			–			9	–	2	–	0
Hutchinson NAS			–			8	–	0	–	0
Selman Field			–			8	–	1	–	0
El Toro Marines			–			8	–	2	–	0
Corpus Christi NAS			–			7	–	1	–	0
North Camp Hood			–			7	–	1	–	0
Little Creek			–			7	–	2	–	0
Santa Barbara Marines			–			7	–	3	–	1
Camp Lee			–			7	–	4	–	0
Camp Beale			–			6	–	1	–	2
Farragut NTS			–			6	–	2	–	0
Eastern Flying Training Command			–			6	–	3	–	1
Great Lakes Navy			–			6	–	4	–	1
Hondo AAF			–			6	–	4	–	1
South Camp Hood			–			5	–	2	–	0
Camp Peary			–			5	–	3	–	0
Bainbridge			–			5	–	4	–	0
Fort Benning			–			5	–	4	–	1
Fort Warren			–			5	–	7	–	0
Fort McClellan			–			4	–	2	–	0
San Diego NTS			–			4	–	2	–	0
Atlantic City NAS			–			4	–	2	–	1
Minter Field			–			4	–	2	–	1
Williams Field			–			4	–	4	–	0
Stockton AAF			–			4	–	5	–	2
Barksdale Field			–			4	–	7	–	0
Fort Pierce			–			4	–	9	–	0
Amarillo AAF			–			3	–	1	–	0
Olathe NAS			–			3	–	2	–	0
Albany Navy			–			3	–	3	–	1
Camp Detrick			–			3	–	4	–	0
Kearney AAF			–			3	–	4	–	0
Bergstrom Field			–			3	–	5	–	1
Keesler Field			–			3	–	6	–	1
Melville PT Boats			–			2	–	1	–	0
Great Bend AAF			–			2	–	4	–	0
Saint Mary's Pre-Flight			–			2	–	4	–	1
Gulfport AAF			–			2	–	5	–	0
Pensacola NAS			–			2	–	7	–	1
Squantum NAS			–			1	–	1	–	0
Camp Blanding			–			1	–	2	–	0
Luke Field			–			1	–	2	–	0
Miami NAS			–			1	–	2	–	0
Miami NTC			–			1	–	3	–	0
NSB New London			–			1	–	3	–	0
Oceana NAS			–			1	–	3	–	0
Fort Riley			–			1	–	4	–	0
Lake Charles AAF			–			1	–	4	–	0
Ellington Field			–			1	–	4	–	1
Cherry Point Marines			–			1	–	8	–	0
Dalhart AAF			–			0	–	3	–	0
Homestead AAB			–			0	–	3	–	0
Fort Monroe			–			0	–	7	–	0
+ – Conference co-champions

The 1945 Bainbridge Commodores football team represented the United States Naval Training Center Bainbridge, Maryland during the 1945 college football season. Led by first-year head coach Paul Pierce, the Commodores compiled a record of 5–4. Bainbridge entered the season with a 17-game winning streak after consecutive undefeated seasons in 1943 and 1944. The Commodores extended the steak to 21 games before losing to Air Transport Command on November 4.

Bainbridge, listed as "Bainbridge Navy" ranked 87th among the nation's college and service teams in the final Litkenhous Ratings.

== Schedule ==
Date	Time	Opponent	Site	Result	Attendance	Source
October 7	2:30 p.m.	Atlantic City NAS	Tome Stadium; Bainbridge, MD	W 14–6	8,000	
October 14		Aberdeen Proving Ground	Tome Stadium; Bainbridge, MD	W 59–7		
October 21	2:00 p.m.	Camp Lee	Tome Stadium; Bainbridge, MD	W 27–0	9,000–10,000	
October 28	2:30 p.m.	Camp Detrick	Tome Stadium; Bainbridge, MD	W 40–0	7,000	
November 4		Air Transport Command	Tome Stadium; Bainbridge, MD	L 6–24		
November 11	2:00 p.m.	at Little Creek	Forman Field; Norfolk, VA	L 0–7	5,000	
November 17	2:00 p.m.	at Camp Lee	Nowak Field; Camp Lee, VA	L 0–26	11,000–12,000	
November 25	2:00 p.m.	First Army	Tome Stadium; Bainbridge, MD	L 14–20		
December 2		Oceana NAS	Tome Stadium; Bainbridge, MD	W 53–14		
All times are in Eastern time
