= 1945 Drake Bulldogs football team =

American college football season

1945 Drake Bulldogs football

Raisin Bowl, W 13–12 vs. Fresno State
- Conference: Missouri Valley Conference
- Record: 5–4–1 (1–2 MVC)
- Head coach: Vee Green (13th season)
- Home stadium: Drake Stadium

1945 Missouri Valley Conference football standings
| | Conf. | | | | | Overall |
| Team | W | | L | | T | W | | L | | T |
|---|---|---|---|---|---|---|---|---|---|---|
| No. 5 Oklahoma A&M $ | 1 | – | 0 | – | 0 | 9 | – | 0 | – | 0 |
| No. 17 Tulsa | 2 | – | 1 | – | 0 | 8 | – | 3 | – | 0 |
| Wichita | 1 | – | 1 | – | 0 | 6 | – | 4 | – | 0 |
| Drake | 1 | – | 2 | – | 0 | 5 | – | 4 | – | 1 |
| Saint Louis | 0 | – | 1 | – | 0 | 5 | – | 4 | – | 0 |
$ – Conference champion; Rankings from AP Poll

The 1945 Drake Bulldogs football team represented Drake University as a member of the Missouri Valley Conference (MVC) during the 1945 college football season. In its 13th season under head coach Vee Green, the team compiled a 5–4–1 record (1–2 in conference games), finished in fourth place out of five teams in the MVC, and outscored opponents by a total of 217 to 115.

At the end of the season, guard Ralph Gruben was the only Drake player selected as a first-team player on the 1945 All-Missouri Valley Conference football team. Three others were named to the second team: end Charles McDowell; tackle Emanuel "Muggsy" Migliorisi; and halfback Perry Harris. Halfback Del Cockayne was given honorable mention.

The 1945 Drake team was the first college football team in Iowa to play in a post-season bowl game. The team defeated Fresno State, 13–12, in the 1946 Raisin Bowl on New Year's Day 1946.

The team played its home games at Drake Stadium in Des Moines, Iowa.

== Schedule ==
| Date | Opponent | Site | Result | Attendance | Source |
|---|---|---|---|---|---|
| September 29 | Kearney Army Air Field | Drake Stadium; Des Moines, IA | W 40–13 | | |
| October 6 | at Tulsa | Skelly Field; Tulsa, OK | L 0–19 | 10,000-11,000 | |
| October 12 | at South Dakota State | Brookings, SD | W 34–0 | | |
| October 20 | Denver | Drake Stadium; Des Moines, IA | T 19–19 | 6,700 | |
| October 26 | at Detroit | University of Detroit Stadium; Detroit, MI | L 14–19 | 10,352 | |
| November 3 | at Saint Louis | Walsh Stadium; St. Louis, MO | W 25–0 | 9,000-10,000 | |
| November 10 | Iowa State Teachers | Drake Stadium; Des Moines, IA | W 53–6 | 2,500 | |
| November 17 | Iowa State | Drake Stadium; Des Moines, IA | L 6–8 | 14,000 | |
| November 22 | at Wichita | Wichita, KS (Thanksgiving Day game) | L 13–19 | | |
| January 1, 1946 | at Fresno State | Ratcliffe Stadium; Fresno, CA (Raisin Bowl) | W 13–12 | 6,782–9,000 | |

== Roster ==
- Tom Arneson, center
- Jimmy Baer, back
- Bruce Brandon, center, 200 pounds
- Del Cockayne, halfback, 135 pounds
- Jack Coupe, halfback
- Mel Deter, guard, back, and placekicker
- Ralph Gruben, guard, 201 pounds
- Perry Harris, halfback, 168 pounds
- Ernie Hobza, quarterback
- Chuck "Butch" McDowell, end
- Jim McLeran, end
- Joe McNeill, end
- Muggsy Migliorisi, tackle
- Orville "Jeff" Myers, tackle
- Elmer Patterson, halfback, 148 pounds
- Keith Perrin, back, 165 pounds
- Mike Rito, center, 165 pounds
- Wallie Rooker, fullback
- Don Siefken, end
- George Stefko, tackle, 206 pounds
- Art Vogel, guard
