= Oklahoma State Cowboys football =

Football program representing Oklahoma State University

| 2026 Oklahoma State Cowboys football team |
- First season: 1901; 125 years ago
- Athletic director: Chad Weiberg
- Head coach: Eric Morris; 1st season, 7–4 (.636)
- Location: Stillwater, Oklahoma
- Stadium: Boone Pickens Stadium (capacity: 53,855)
- NCAA division: Division I FBS
- Conference: Big 12
- Colors: Orange and black
- All-time record: 643–593–48 (.519)
- Bowl record: 22–12 (.647)

National championships
- Claimed: 1945
- Unclaimed: 2011

Conference championships
- MVIAA: 1926 MVC: 1930, 1931, 1932, 1933, 1944, 1945, 1948, 1953 Big Eight: 1976 Big 12: 2011

Division championships
- Big 12 South: 2010
- Heisman winners: Barry Sanders – 1988
- Consensus All-Americans: 20
- Rivalries: Oklahoma (rivalry); Tulsa (rivalry); Texas Tech (rivalry)

Uniforms
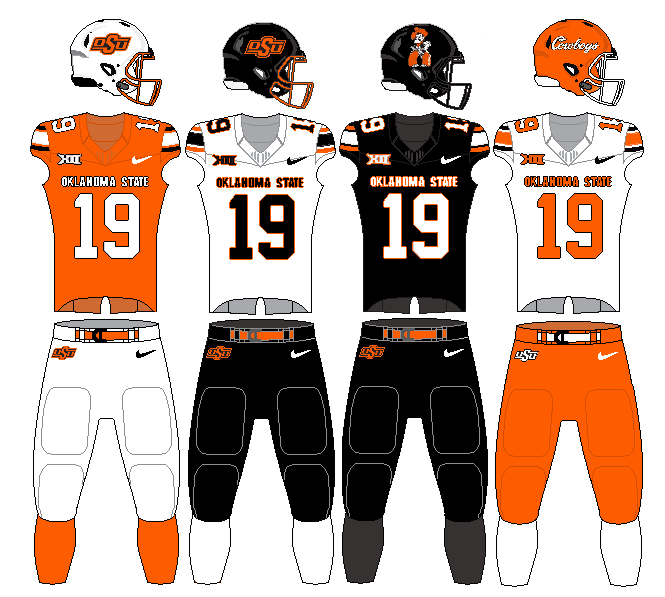
- Fight song: Ride 'em Cowboys
- Mascot: Pistol Pete
- Marching band: Cowboy Marching Band
- Outfitter: Nike
- Website: okstate.com

The Oklahoma State Cowboys football program represents Oklahoma State University in college football. The team is a member of the Big 12 Conference and competes at the NCAA Division I Football Bowl Subdivision level. Oklahoma State plays its home games at Boone Pickens Stadium in Stillwater, Oklahoma.

Since the beginning of the program in 1901, Oklahoma State has compiled a 641–592–48 record for a .520 winning percentage. Oklahoma State claims one national championship in 1945 (awarded by the AFCA) in addition to eleven conference championships, and the team has also appeared in 34 bowl games, amassing a 22–12 bowl game record, which include 5 victories in New Year's Six bowl games. The Cowboys have produced 66 All-Americans with 50 being first-team (20 consensus, 8 unanimous) selections. Running back Barry Sanders won the Heisman Trophy in 1988, and the school has had 8 former players and coaches inducted into the College Football Hall of Fame.

== History ==
=== Early history (1900–1938) ===
The Oklahoma A&M Aggies (also referred to as the Tigers) played their first season of football in 1900 and joined their first conference for the start of the 1915 season, the Southwest Conference. In 1925, the Oklahoma A&M program joined the Missouri Valley Intercollegiate Athletic Association. In 1928, the MVIAA split into the Big Six Conference and the Missouri Valley Conference. A&M was the only large school that joined the smaller MVC.

=== Jim Lookabaugh era (1939–1949) ===
Jim Lookabaugh, an OSU alum who lettered in multiple sports, led the Aggies for eleven seasons beginning in 1939. He took Oklahoma A&M to new heights under his leadership, leading the Aggies to their first bowl game and bowl win in the 1944 season, posting a dominant shutout victory over TCU in the Cotton Bowl.

Lookabaugh followed with an undefeated 9–0 campaign and national championship in 1945, highlighted by a Sugar Bowl victory over Saint Mary's. The Cowboys opened the season with road wins over Arkansas and Denver, and weeks later cemented themselves as one of the best teams in the country following a ranked victory over Tulsa. Oklahoma State continued to dominate opponents, posting their largest win ever over Bedlam rival Oklahoma, blowing out the Sooners in a 47–0 shutout victory. The Cowboys would be invited to the Sugar Bowl, where they capped their undefeated season with a 33–13 win. In October 2016, Oklahoma State was retroactively awarded the 1945 national championship by a committee of the American Football Coaches Association (AFCA), consisting of former Baylor coach Grant Teaff, Georgia's Vince Dooley, and Texas A&M's R.C. Slocum.

Oklahoma State would have only one more winning season under Lookabaugh, a 6–4 campaign in 1948 that featured a Missouri Valley Conference championship and Delta Bowl loss to William & Mary. Lookabaugh stepped down after the 1949 season, finishing his tenure with a mark of 58–41–6.

=== Jennings B. Whitworth era (1950–1954) ===
From 1950 to 1954, Jennings B. Whitworth coached at Oklahoma A&M, and compiled a 22–27–1 record, which included only one winning season, a 7–3 campaign in 1953. In 1951, Oklahoma A&M players and coaches caused the Johnny Bright incident, a violent on-field assault against an African American player from Drake University, Johnny Bright; Oklahoma A&M administration would attempt to cover up and deny the incident for over half a century. Whitworth departed A&M to accept the head coaching position at Alabama following the 1954 season.

=== Cliff Speagle era (1955–1962) ===
Cliff Speegle would take the reins of the Oklahoma A&M Cowboys in 1955. Under Speegle's tutelage, the Cowboys compiled a record of 36–42–3, which included three winning seasons from 1957 to 1959 and a Bluegrass Bowl victory over Florida State in 1958. The losing record, combined with an 0–8 mark against rival Oklahoma, resulted in Speegle's firing following the 1962 season. However, his tenure would come during a transition period, as in 1956, A&M announced it was joining (or rejoining, depending on one's view) what had become the Big Seven for the 1958–59 academic year. As part of a transition period, the Cowboys went independent for two years. On May 15, 1957, Oklahoma A&M changed its name to Oklahoma State University. They officially became a part of the renamed Big Eight Conference in 1958.

=== Phil Cutchin era (1963–1968) ===
Longtime Bear Bryant assistant Phil Cutchin led Oklahoma State to its first win over Oklahoma in 20 years, but failed to bring success to Stillwater, compiling a mark of 19–38–2. Cutchin was replaced by the OSU administration eager to see a winning product on the field.

=== Floyd Gass era (1969–1971) ===
Oklahoma State continued to struggle under head coach Floyd Gass, an OSU alum, who led the Cowboy football program for three seasons. During his tenure, he led the team to three straight losing seasons. Fan and administration support became increasingly hard to come by as the on-field production slipped. Despite the lack of football success, Gass would serve in multiple capacities at Oklahoma State, including athletics director for several years after his resignation as football coach.

=== Dave Smith era (1972) ===
The Cowboys were finally able to enjoy a winning season, their first in nine years, in 1972 under the leadership of head coach Dave Smith. The Cowboys went 6–5 and picked up a major upset, shocking 3rd-ranked Colorado 31–6 in Stillwater. However, Smith wouldn't stick around, as he departed for the head coaching position at SMU after just one season in Stillwater.

=== Jim Stanley era (1973–1978) ===
Jim Stanley, a two-time defensive coordinator at Oklahoma State, returned to Stillwater to become the head coach of the Cowboys in 1973. He coached them from 1973 to 1978, amassing a career record of 35–31–2. In 1974, Stanley's Cowboys earned a Fiesta Bowl victory over BYU, the first bowl win for Oklahoma State in over a decade. Two years later, his 1976 team ended the season 9–3, finishing as a Big Eight co-champions on their way to a Tangerine Bowl victory, again over BYU. His success at Oklahoma State earned him many accolades, including being invited to coach three collegiate all-star games: the 1973 East–West Shrine Game, the 1977 Hula Bowl, and the 1977 Japan Bowl.

In 1978, the Big Eight Conference initiated an investigation into the OSU football program in response to allegations of violations of several NCAA rules and regulations while Stanley was head coach. Stanley successfully filed suit against the conference to require them to provide various due process protections in their final hearing on the charges.

=== Jimmy Johnson era (1979–1983) ===
In 1979, Jimmy Johnson got the head coaching job at Oklahoma State. Johnson's successful rebuilding of the inconsistent Cowboys football program is a hallmark in the long history of Cowboy football. Johnson guided Oklahoma State to a 7–4 record in his first season as head coach, and later led the Cowboys to 7–5 record in 1981, ending the season with a loss to Texas A&M in the Independence Bowl. In his final season, he led the Cowboys to an 8–4 record and a 24–14 victory over 20th-ranked Baylor in the Astro-Bluebonnet Bowl.

In early 1984, when he was offered the head coaching job at Miami, Jimmy Johnson was unsure if he wanted to leave Stillwater. His good friend Larry Lacewell told Johnson that if he wanted to win a national championship and eventually coach in the NFL he had to take the Miami job. Johnson soon after accepted the head coaching job at Miami. Jimmy Johnson left Oklahoma State with an overall record of 29–25–3.

=== Pat Jones era (1984–1994) ===
Pat Jones was promoted from assistant coach to head coach following Johnson's departure. He served as head coach of the Oklahoma State Cowboys from 1984 to 1994 after five years as an assistant under Jimmy Johnson. His first season leading the team in 1984 included a season-opening blowout victory over 12th-ranked Arizona State in Tempe, and a Bedlam matchup between the 2nd-ranked Oklahoma Sooners and the 3rd-ranked Cowboys on November 24, 1984, a game in which the Cowboys ultimately lost, 24–14. Oklahoma State would bounce back to defeat South Carolina in the Gator Bowl, and would close the season 10–2 and ranked 5th in the Coaches Poll. The Cowboys would regress a bit in 1985, only going 8–4 and concluding the season with a loss to Florida State in a return visit to the Gator Bowl. Oklahoma State would again go 10–2 in 1987, closely defeating West Virginia in the Sun Bowl to finish the season ranked 11th in the AP Poll. The Cowboys would have a nearly identical season in 1988, again posting a 10–2 record and concluding the season ranked 11th in the AP Poll following a dominant win over Wyoming in the Holiday Bowl.

During his 11 years at Oklahoma State, Jones compiled a 62–60–3 record, including a 3–1 bowl game record from 1984 to 1988, the most successful period in school history at the time. With a talented roster that included running backs Barry Sanders and Thurman Thomas, wide receiver Hart Lee Dykes and quarterback Mike Gundy, they went 44–15 over this five-year stretch, winning 10 games three times over this period. Jones would be named Big Eight Coach of the Year in both 1984 and 1992.

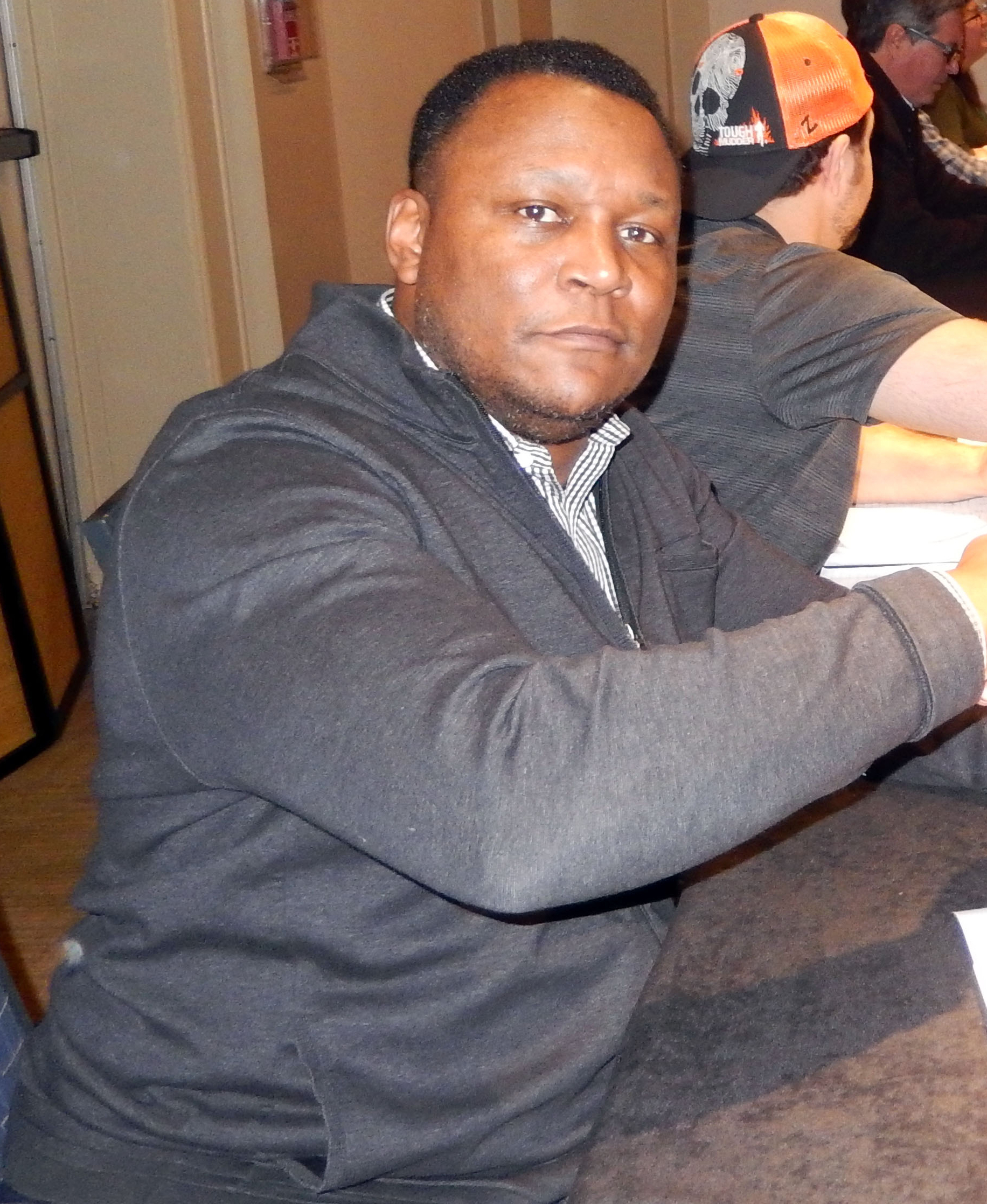
Former OSU running back Barry Sanders.

Running back Barry Sanders played for the Cowboys from 1986 to 1988. During his first two seasons at Oklahoma State, he backed up All-American Thurman Thomas. In 1987, Sanders led the nation in yards per kickoff return (31.6), while also rushing for over 600 yards and scoring 8 touchdowns. After the 1987 season, Thomas moved on to the NFL, and Sanders became the starter for his junior year. In 1988, in what has been called the greatest individual season in college football history, Sanders led the nation by averaging 7.6 yards per carry and over 200 yards per game, including rushing for over 300 yards in four games. Despite his massive workload of 344 carries, Sanders was still used as the team's punt and kickoff returner, adding another 516 yards on special teams. He set college football season records with 2,628 yards rushing, 3,248 total yards, 234 points, 39 touchdowns, 37 rushing touchdowns, 5 consecutive 200 yard games, scored at least 2 touchdowns in 11 consecutive games, and 9 times he scored at least 3 touchdowns. Sanders also ran for 222 yards and scored 5 touchdowns in his three quarters of action in the Holiday Bowl, a game that is not included in the official NCAA season statistics. Sanders learned of his Heisman Trophy win while he was with the team in Tokyo, Japan, preparing to face Texas Tech in the Coca-Cola Classic. He chose to leave Oklahoma State before his senior season to enter the NFL draft.

Days after the 1988 season, Oklahoma State and the NCAA released the results of an unusual joint investigation into the football program. The investigation revealed several major violations dating prior to Johnson's tenure, principally involvement in a "bidding war" for Dykes out of high school. The Cowboys were banned from bowl games for three years and from live television for two years, and they were also limited to 20 scholarships from 1989 to 1992. Jones was not directly implicated in any wrongdoing; indeed, the investigation found that no violations had taken place in two years. He was unable to put together another winning team due to the sanctions, and left OSU after the 1994 season. In Jones' last six years, the Cowboys won only seven games in Big Eight play, including three seasons of winless conference records. Oklahoma State would need almost the entire decade of the 1990s to recover, with only one winning season coming between 1989 and 2001.

=== Bob Simmons era (1995–2000) ===
Bob Simmons came to OSU from his post as defensive line coach at Colorado to replace Jones. Simmons' teams were largely unsuccessful, and Simmons resigned under pressure following the 2000 season. His final record in Stillwater was 30–38 with just one winning campaign, an 8–4 season in 1997 that culminated in a loss in the Alamo Bowl to Purdue. In 1996, OSU joined with the other Big Eight schools and four schools from the old Southwest Conference to form the Big 12 Conference.

=== Les Miles era (2001–2004) ===
After Simmons' resignation, a coaching search produced Dirk Koetter as the new head coach. Hours after accepting the job, Koetter reneged on his offer in order to coach at Arizona State.

The next two candidates were Les Miles, a former OSU offensive coordinator, and Mike Gundy, a former OSU player and coach. Miles was hired as head coach while Gundy was brought on as offensive coordinator. In his first year as head coach, Miles would achieve a 4–7 record. In the 2001 regular season finale, the underdog Cowboys would defeat the reigning national champion Oklahoma Sooners in Norman, 16–13. In 2002, Miles would post a 7–5 regular season record, with Oklahoma State again upsetting Oklahoma, this time in Stillwater. The team would go on to make the Houston Bowl, where they defeated Southern Miss. The Cowboys would improve to 9–4 in 2003, earning a trip to the Cotton Bowl, where they would fall to Ole Miss despite a valiant comeback attempt in the closing minutes. In 2004, Oklahoma State would finish 7–5, getting blown out by Ohio State in the Alamo Bowl to end the season. Miles left after the 2004 season to take the head coaching position at LSU.

=== Mike Gundy era (2005–2025) ===
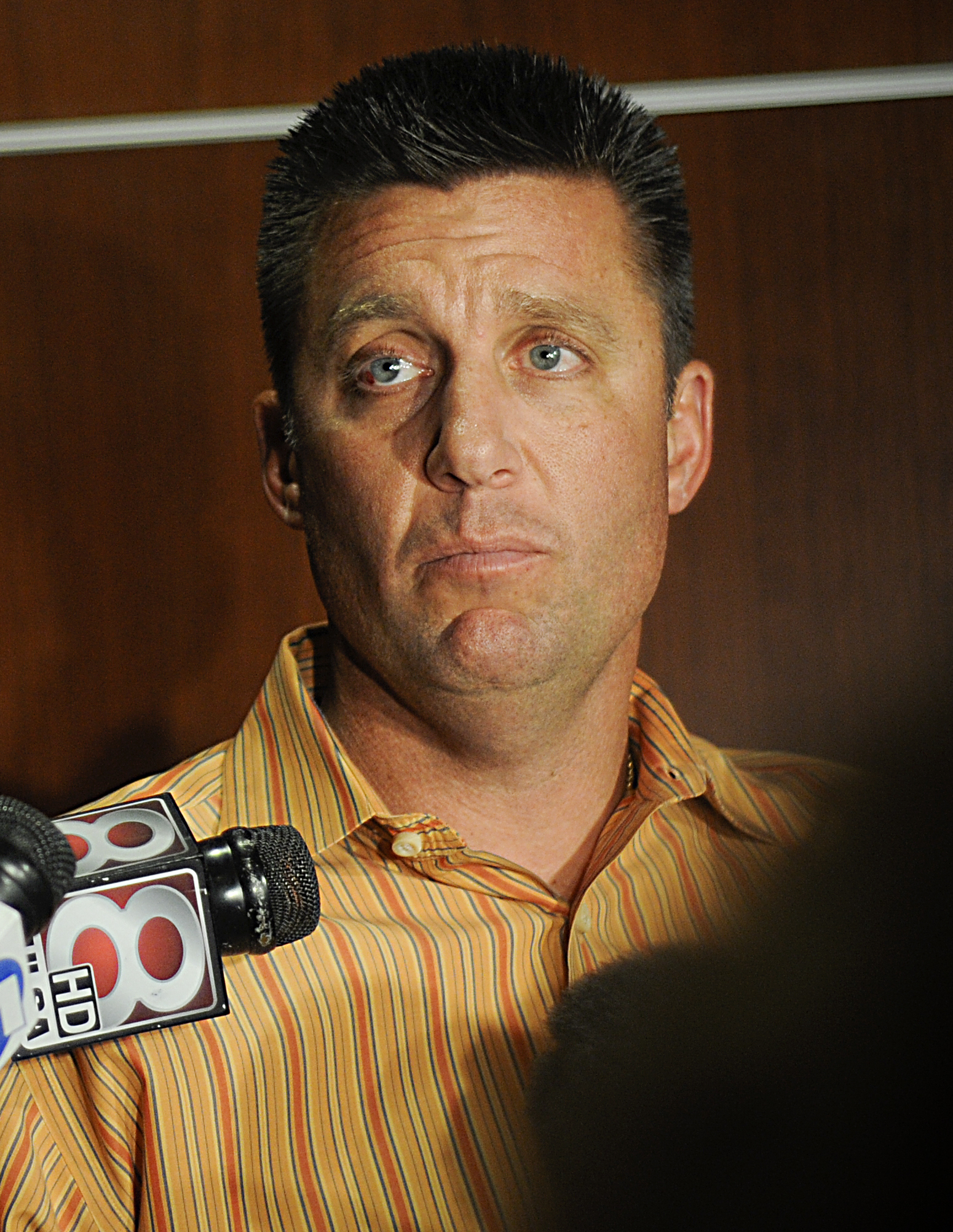
Former head coach Mike Gundy

Mike Gundy was promoted from offensive coordinator and named immediately as Miles' successor and the 23rd head coach at Oklahoma State. Gundy was one of three head football coaches at Oklahoma State to have played for Oklahoma State, along with Jim Lookabaugh and Floyd Gass. His first season saw the expulsion of 11 players from the team, and the Cowboys struggled to a 4–7 record, winning only one conference game. In 2006, the team would significantly improve and Oklahoma State finished 7–6, punctuated by a victory over Alabama in the Independence Bowl. In 2007, the Cowboys again posted a 6–6 regular season record and ended the season with a win over Indiana in the Insight Bowl. After their second straight bowl appearance, Gundy was rewarded with a contract extension through the 2013 season.

In 2008, Oklahoma State posted a 9–3 regular season record and earned a trip to the Holiday Bowl, falling in a close game to Oregon. Following the season, Gundy received a new seven-year contract worth $15.7 million. The Cowboys began the 2009 season ranked 9th in the AP Poll, but dreams of a miracle season were crushed when Oklahoma State lost to unranked Houston at home the following week, and later found out that star wide receiver Dez Bryant was controversially ruled ineligible for the remainder of the season for failing to disclose contact with 8-time pro bowler Deion Sanders to the NCAA. The Cowboys would go on to finish a disappointing 9–4 with a Cotton Bowl loss to Ole Miss. The following year, Oklahoma State hired offensive coordinator Dana Holgorsen from the University of Houston. In 2010, Coach Gundy recorded the first ever 11-win season in Oklahoma State history. What was supposed to be a rebuilding year turned into one of the best in school history, as the Cowboys dominated Arizona in the Alamo Bowl, finishing the season 11–2 and ranked 10th in the Coaches Poll.

In 2011, Oklahoma State won their first Big 12 Championship in school history with a 44–10 victory over rival Oklahoma in the Bedlam Series. The nationally 3rd-ranked Cowboys eventually went on to win the Tostitos Fiesta Bowl by defeating 4th-ranked Stanford in overtime, 41–38, on January 2, 2012. Early in the 2012 season, Gundy notched his 63rd win as head coach, passing Jones as the winningest coach in school history. The Cowboys would finish 8–5 that year, ending the season with a blowout win over Purdue in the Heart of Dallas Bowl. Gundy would lead Oklahoma State to another ten-win season in 2013, finishing with a close loss to Missouri in the Cotton Bowl. The Cowboys would go 7–6 in 2014, upsetting Oklahoma in Norman before defeating Washington in the Cactus Bowl. Gundy would then lead Oklahoma State to three straight ten-win seasons, going 10–3 from 2015 to 2017. In 2015, the Cowboys opened the season 10–0 before losing their final three games, concluding the season with a lopsided loss to Ole Miss in the Sugar Bowl. In 2016, Mike Gundy recorded his 100th victory as a head coach in an upset win over 10th-ranked West Virginia, and Oklahoma State would close the season with a dominant victory over Colorado in the Alamo Bowl. Oklahoma State would again reach ten wins in 2017, ending the season with a win over Virginia Tech in the Camping World Bowl. The Cowboys struggled in 2018, only going 7–6 despite upset wins over Texas and West Virginia, but concluded the season by earning an upset victory over 24th-ranked Missouri in the Liberty Bowl. The Cowboys would improve to 8–5 in 2019, falling to Texas A&M in the Texas Bowl to conclude the season. Oklahoma State posted a much more successful 8–3 campaign in 2020, culminated by a victory over Miami in the Cheez-It Bowl.

In 2021, Oklahoma State defeated Oklahoma in the Bedlam Series to clinch a spot in the Big 12 Championship game and climb to 5th in the AP Poll. In the Big 12 Championship game, the Cowboys rallied after being down 15 points at halftime, but were defeated by Baylor in heartbreaking fashion following a goal-line stand by the Baylor defense in the closing seconds. The Cowboys would bounce back with a historical comeback victory over Notre Dame in the Fiesta Bowl, finishing 7th in the final polls. The Cowboys would start 6–1 in 2022, but would go on to lose six of the final seven games, ending the season with a loss to Wisconsin in the Guaranteed Rate Bowl. Gundy would rebound to lead Oklahoma State to another successful season in 2023, highlighted by a win over Bedlam rival Oklahoma in the final scheduled game of the series. The Cowboys would fall to Texas in the Big 12 Championship, but would bounce back to defeat Texas A&M in the Texas Bowl to close the year 10–4, Gundy's eighth ten-win season and Oklahoma State's 12th bowl win under his leadership.

Oklahoma State would jump out to a 3–0 start in 2024, but dropped out of the rankings after consecutive losses. After a blowout loss to TCU, the Cowboys clinched their first losing season since 2005, ending an bowl streak that spanned for 18 seasons. The Cowboys would go on to lose their final 9 games, going winless in conference play and clinching the worst season since 1991, when they went winless. Following a 1–2 start in 2025 featuring an upset loss to Tulsa, Gundy was fired. He ended his tenure the winningest coach in Oklahoma State history, going 170–90 over 21 seasons.

Offensive coordinator Doug Meacham was named interim head coach for the remainder of the 2025 season, effectively becoming the 24th head coach at Oklahoma State. The Cowboys would go 0–9 under Meachum, ending the season 1–11. Notably, Oklahoma State held a 14–0 halftime lead at UCF before getting shutout in the second half and losing 17–14 en route to the worst season since 1991 and the most losses in program history.

=== Eric Morris era (2026–present) ===
On November 25, 2025, Eric Morris was hired out of North Texas as the 25th head coach at Oklahoma State. Following a season-opening loss at Tulsa, Oklahoma State rebounded with a major upset victory over 6th-ranked Oregon for their first FBS win in two years. It was the first time in FBS history that a team riding a 10-game losing streak broke it against a Top 10 opponent. Two weeks later, the Cowboys recorded their first conference victory in over two years, going on the road and defeating West Virginia. Oklahoma State would later clinch bowl eligibility for the first time in three years following a blowout road win over Kansas State.

== Conference affiliations ==
- Independent (1901–1914, 1957–1959)
- Southwest Conference (1915–1924)
- Missouri Valley Intercollegiate Athletic Association (1925–1927)
- Missouri Valley Conference (1928–1956)
- Big Eight Conference (1960–1995)
- Big 12 Conference (1996–present)

== Championships ==
=== National championships ===
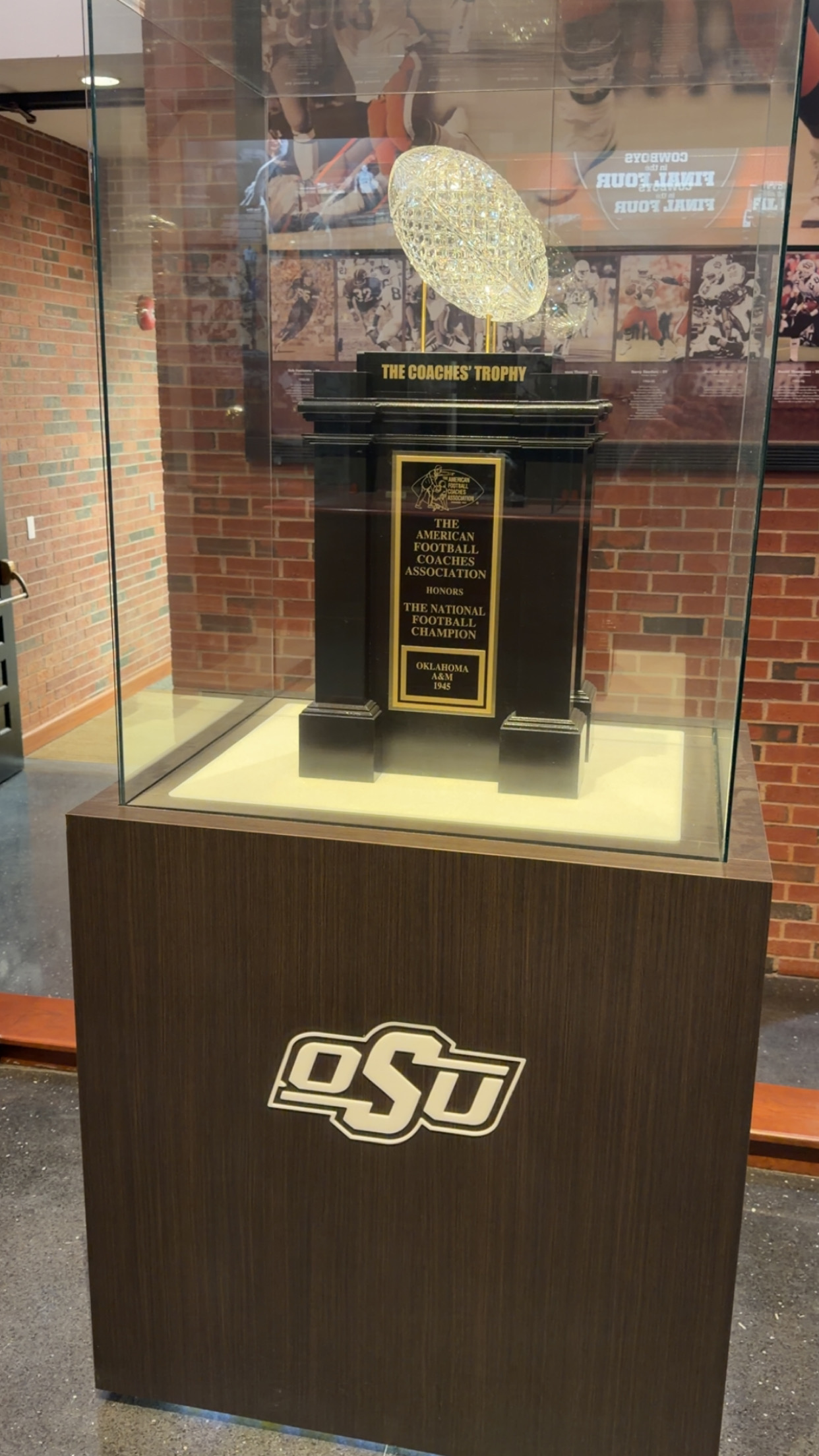
1945 AFCA National Championship Trophy awarded to Oklahoma State

The 1945 Oklahoma A&M football team was retroactively awarded the AFCA national championship and The Coaches' Trophy by the American Football Coaches Association (who conduct the Coaches Poll) in October 2016 through their Blue Ribbon Commission. The Cowboys went 9–0 and capped off the undefeated championship season with a 33–13 win over Saint Mary's in the Sugar Bowl. To date, it is the only undefeated season in Oklahoma State football history.

Additionally, the 2011 Oklahoma State Cowboys football team was selected by NCAA-designated major selector Colley Matrix after a 12–1 season, highlighted by a Big 12 championship and Fiesta Bowl win. However, Oklahoma State does not claim this title.

| Season | Coach | Selector(s) | Record | Bowl | Opponent | Result | Final AP | Final Coaches' |
|---|---|---|---|---|---|---|---|---|
| 1945 | Jim Lookabaugh | AFCA | 9–0 | Sugar Bowl | Saint Mary's | W 33–13 | No. 5 | – |

=== Conference championships ===
The Cowboys have won eleven conference championships, six outright and five shared.

| Season | Coach | Conference | Overall Record | Conference Record |
|---|---|---|---|---|
| 1926 | John Maulbetsch | Missouri Valley Intercollegiate Athletic Association | 3–4–1 | 3–0–1 |
| 1930 † | Lynn O. Waldorf | Missouri Valley Conference | 7–2–1 | 2–0 |
| 1931 † | Lynn O. Waldorf | Missouri Valley Conference | 8–2–1 | 1–0 |
| 1932 | Lynn O. Waldorf | Missouri Valley Conference | 9–1–2 | 3–0 |
| 1933 † | Lynn O. Waldorf | Missouri Valley Conference | 6–2–1 | 2–0 |
| 1944 | Jim Lookabaugh | Missouri Valley Conference | 8–1 | 1–0 |
| 1945 | Jim Lookabaugh | Missouri Valley Conference | 9–0 | 1–0 |
| 1948 | Jim Lookabaugh | Missouri Valley Conference | 6–4 | 2–0 |
| 1953 † | J.B. Whitworth | Missouri Valley Conference | 7–3 | 3–1 |
| 1976 † | Jim Stanley | Big Eight Conference | 9–3 | 5–2 |
| 2011 | Mike Gundy | Big 12 Conference | 12–1 | 8–1 |
† Co-champions

=== Division championships ===
The Cowboys have won one division championship.

| Season | Coach | Division | Overall Record | Conference Record | Opponent | CG result |
|---|---|---|---|---|---|---|
| 2010† | Mike Gundy | Big 12 South | 11–2 | 6–2 | N/A lost tie-breaker to Oklahoma | |
† Co-champions

== Head coaches ==
The Cowboys have had 25 head coaches in their history. Current head coach Eric Morris was hired on November 25, 2025, and introduced as the head coach on December 8. For the first four seasons the team played without an official head coach. The team's first head coach, F. A. McCoy, was hired in 1905 and coached for a single season. Mike Gundy is the all-time leader in games coached (260), wins (170) and years coached (21), while Pappy Waldorf is the all-time leader in winning percentage (.735). The coach with lowest winning percentage is Ted Cox (.233). Eight coaches have led the Cowboys to postseason bowl games: Jim Lookabaugh, Cliff Speegle, Jim Stanley, Jimmy Johnson, Pat Jones, Bob Simmons, Les Miles and Mike Gundy. Six coaches have won conference championships with the Cowboys: John Maulbetsch, Lynn Waldorf, Lookabaugh, Jennings B. Whitworth, Stanley, and Gundy. One coach, Lookabaugh, retroactively won a national championship with the Cowboys. Four head coaches, Maulbetsch, Waldorf, Exendine, and Johnson have been inducted in the College Football Hall of Fame.

=== Coaching staff ===
| Name | Position | Consecutive season at Oklahoma State in current position | Previous position |
|---|---|---|---|
| Doug Meacham | Offensive coordinator | 1st | TCU – Inside wide receivers coach (2024). |
| Todd Grantham | Defensive coordinator | 1st | New Orleans Saints – Defensive Line (2023–2024) |
| Andrew Mitchell | Co–Offensive Line | 1st | New Mexico State – Assistant Head Coach / Offensive Line (2022–2024) |
| Cooper Bassett | Co–Offensive Line | 1st | Utah State – Co–Offensive Coordinator / Offensive Line (2024) |
| Kevin Johns | Quarterback | 1st | Oklahoma – Interim Co–Offensive Coordinator / Quarterbacks (2024) |
| Cory Patterson | Running Backs | 1st | Purdue – Associate Head Coach / Wide Receivers (2023–2024) |
| D. J. Tialavea | Tight Ends | 1st | Utah State – Tight Ends (2021–2024) |
| Ryan Osborn | Defensive line | 1st | Charlotte – Defensive Coordinator / Outside Linebackers (2023–2024) |
| Ryan McNamara | Co–Linebackers | 1st | Central Michigan – Linebackers (2023–2024) |
| Kap Dede | Co–Linebackers | 1st | Western Kentucky – Outside Linebackers (2024) |
| Jules Montinar | Cornerbacks | 1st | East Carolina – Defensive Pass Game Coordinator / Cornerbacks (2023–2024) |
| Greg Brown | Co–Safeties | 1st | Oklahoma State – Defensive Analyst (2024) |
| Kevie Thompson | Co–Safeties | 1st | East Mississippi Community College – Defensive Coordinator (2022–2024) |
| Sean Snyder | Punters and Kickers | 2nd | Kansas – Special Assistant to the Head Coach (2023) |
| Rob Glass | Strength & Conditioning | 20th | Florida – Director of Strength and Conditioning (1998–2004) |

== Bowl games ==
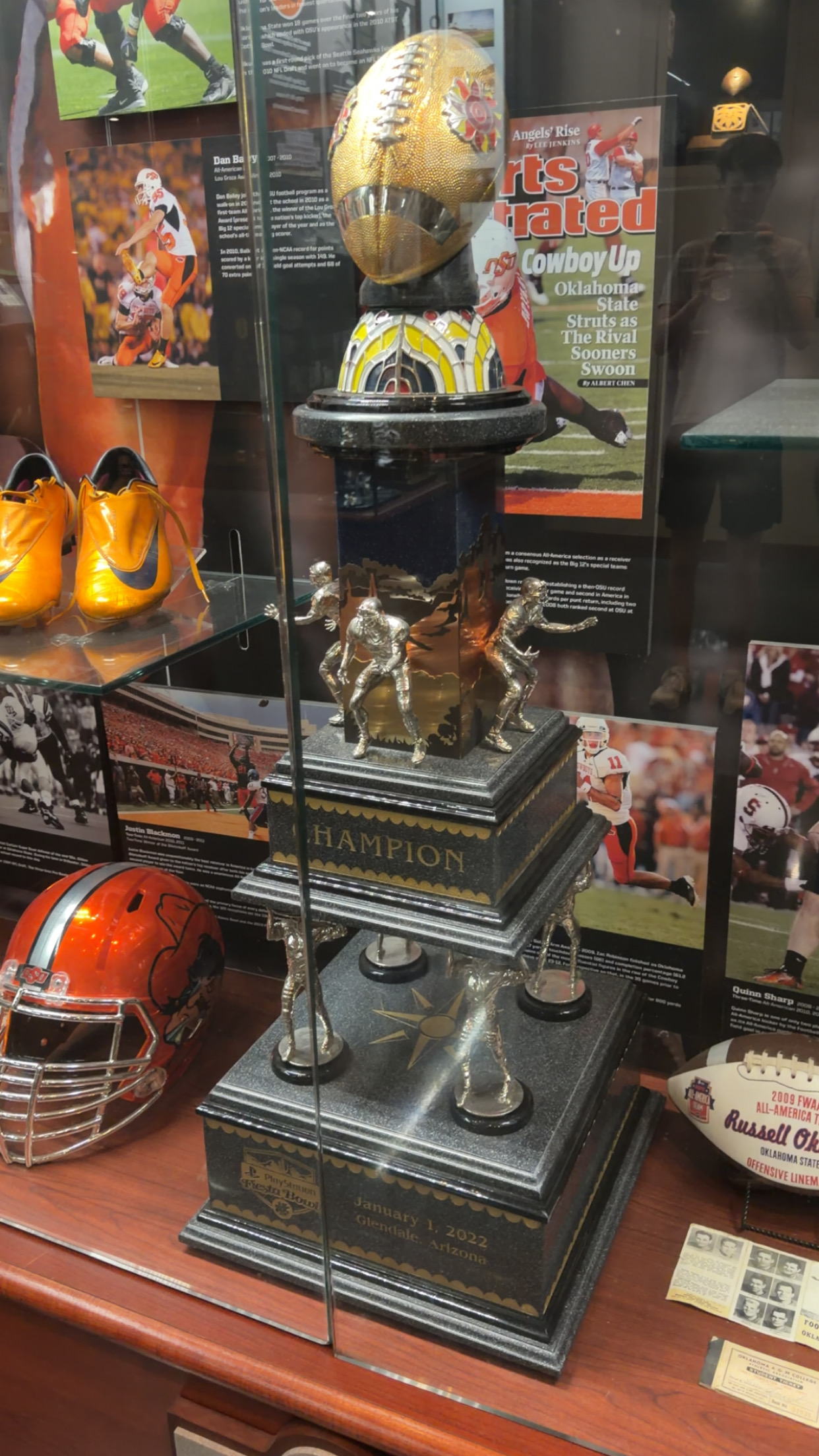
2022 Fiesta Bowl Trophy won by Oklahoma State

Since the establishment of the team in 1901, the Oklahoma State Cowboys have appeared in 34 bowl games and have a record of 22 victories and 12 losses. The team's first bowl game appearance was in the 1945 Cotton Bowl Classic, which was a 34–0 victory over TCU. The most recent bowl game appearance by the Cowboys was in the 2023 Texas Bowl, which was a 31–23 victory over Texas A&M. They are 5–4 in the New Year's Six bowl games (Rose, Peach, Cotton Bowl Classic, Sugar, Fiesta and Orange), with their biggest win being over Stanford in the 2012 Fiesta Bowl, with the win making them finish 3rd in the final AP and Coaches poll, the highest ever finish for a Cowboy team.

| No. | Bowl | Score (Note: Oklahoma State currently holds a 22-12 bowl record) | Date | Season | Opponent | Stadium | Location | Attendance | Head coach |
|---|---|---|---|---|---|---|---|---|---|
| 1 | Cotton Bowl Classic | W 34–0 | January 1, 1945 | 1944 | TCU | Cotton Bowl | Dallas, Texas | 37,500 | Jim Lookabaugh |
| 2 | Sugar Bowl | W 33–13 | January 6, 1946 | 1945 | St. Mary's | Tulane Stadium | New Orleans, Louisiana | 68,822 | Jim Lookabaugh |
| 3 | Delta Bowl | L 0–20 | January 1, 1949 | 1948 | William & Mary | Crump Stadium | Memphis, Tennessee | 15,069 | Jim Lookabaugh |
| 4 | Bluegrass Bowl | W 15–6 | December 13, 1958 | 1958 | Florida State | Cardinal Stadium | Louisville, Kentucky | 3,152 | Cliff Speegle |
| 5 | Fiesta Bowl | W 16–6 | December 28, 1974 | 1974 | BYU | Sun Devil Stadium | Tempe, Arizona | 50,878 | Jim Stanley |
| 6 | Tangerine Bowl | W 49–21 | December 18, 1976 | 1976 | BYU | Tangerine Bowl | Orlando, Florida | 37,812 | Jim Stanley |
| 7 | Independence Bowl | L 16–33 | December 12, 1981 | 1981 | Texas A&M | Independence Bowl | Shreveport, Louisiana | 48,600 | Jimmy Johnson |
| 8 | Astro-Bluebonnet Bowl | W 24–14 | December 31, 1983 | 1983 | Baylor | Astrodome | Houston, Texas | 50,090 | Jimmy Johnson |
| 9 | Gator Bowl | W 21–14 | December 28, 1984 | 1984 | South Carolina | Gator Bowl Stadium | Jacksonville, Florida | 82,138 | Pat Jones |
| 10 | Gator Bowl | L 23–34 | December 30, 1985 | 1985 | Florida State | Gator Bowl Stadium | Jacksonville, Florida | 79,417 | Pat Jones |
| 11 | Sun Bowl | W 35–33 | December 25, 1987 | 1987 | West Virginia | Sun Bowl | El Paso, Texas | 43,240 | Pat Jones |
| 12 | Holiday | W 62–14 | December 30, 1988 | 1988 | Wyoming | Jack Murphy Stadium | San Diego, California | 60,641 | Pat Jones |
| 13 | Alamo Bowl | L 20–33 | December 30, 1997 | 1997 | Purdue | Alamodome | San Antonio, Texas | 55,552 | Pat Simmons |
| 14 | Houston Bowl | W 33–23 | December 27, 2002 | 2002 | Southern Miss | Reliant Stadium | Houston, Texas | 44,687 | Les Miles |
| 15 | Cotton Bowl Classic | L 28–31 | January 2, 2004 | 2003 | Ole Miss | Cotton Bowl | Dallas, Texas | 73,928 | Les Miles |
| 16 | Alamo Bowl | L 7–33 | December 29, 2004 | 2004 | Ohio State | Alamodome | San Antonio, Texas | 65,265 | Les Miles |
| 17 | Independence Bowl | W 34–31 | December 28, 2006 | 2006 | Alabama | Independence Stadium | Shreveport, Louisiana | 45,054 | Mike Gundy |
| 18 | Insight Bowl | W 49–33 | December 31, 2007 | 2007 | Indiana | Sun Devil Stadium | Tempe, Arizona | 48,892 | Mike Gundy |
| 19 | Holiday Bowl | L 31–42 | December 30, 2008 | 2008 | Oregon | Qualcomm Stadium | San Diego, California | 59,106 | Mike Gundy |
| 20 | Cotton Bowl Classic | L 7–21 | January 2, 2010 | 2009 | Ole Miss | Cowboys Stadium | Arlington, Texas | 77,928 | Mike Gundy |
| 21 | Alamo Bowl | W 36–10 | December 29, 2010 | 2010 | Arizona | Alamodome | San Antonio, Texas | 57,593 | Mike Gundy |
| 22 | Fiesta Bowl | W 41–38^{OT} | January 2, 2012 | 2011 | Stanford | University of Phoenix Stadium | Glendale, Arizona | 69,927 | Mike Gundy |
| 23 | Heart Of Dallas Bowl | W 58–14 | January 1, 2013 | 2012 | Purdue | Cotton Bowl | Dallas, Texas | 48,313 | Mike Gundy |
| 24 | Cotton Bowl Classic | L 31–41 | January 3, 2014 | 2013 | Missouri | AT&T Stadium | Arlington, Texas | 72,690 | Mike Gundy |
| 25 | Cactus Bowl | W 30–22 | January 2, 2015 | 2014 | Washington | Sun Devil Stadium | Tempe, Arizona | 35,409 | Mike Gundy |
| 26 | Sugar Bowl | L 20–48 | January 1, 2016 | 2015 | Ole Miss | Mercedes-Benz Superdome | New Orleans, Louisiana | 72,117 | Mike Gundy |
| 27 | Alamo Bowl | W 38–8 | December 29, 2016 | 2016 | Colorado | Alamodome | San Antonio, Texas | 59,815 | Mike Gundy |
| 28 | Camping World Bowl | W 30–21 | December 28, 2017 | 2017 | Virginia Tech | Camping World Stadium | Orlando, Florida | 39,610 | Mike Gundy |
| 29 | Liberty Bowl | W 38–33 | December 31, 2018 | 2018 | Missouri | Liberty Bowl | Memphis, Tennessee | 51,587 | Mike Gundy |
| 30 | Texas Bowl | L 21–24 | December 27, 2019 | 2019 | Texas A&M | NRG Stadium | Houston, Texas | 68,415 | Mike Gundy |
| 31 | Cheez-It Bowl | W 37–34 | December 29, 2020 | 2020 | Miami | Camping World Stadium | Orlando, Florida | 0 (Note: Due to the COVID-19 pandemic, there was no reported attendance at the game.) | Mike Gundy |
| 32 | Fiesta Bowl | W 37–35 | January 1, 2022 | 2021 | Notre Dame | State Farm Stadium | Glendale, Arizona | 49,550 | Mike Gundy |
| 33 | Guaranteed Rate Bowl | L 17–24 | December 27, 2022 | 2022 | Wisconsin | Chase Field | Phoenix, Arizona | 23,187 | Mike Gundy |
| 34 | Texas Bowl | W 31–23 | December 27, 2023 | 2023 | Texas A&M | NRG Stadium | Houston, Texas | 56,212 | Mike Gundy |

== Rivalries ==
=== Oklahoma ===
The first Bedlam game was held at Island Park in Guthrie, Oklahoma. It was a cold, and very windy day with the temperatures well below the freezing mark. At one moment in the game when the Oklahoma A&M Aggies were punting, the wind carried the ball backwards behind the kicker. If the Oklahoma A&M squad recovered the ball it would be a touchback and if the University of Oklahoma squad recovered it, it would be a touchdown. The ball kept going backwards and rolled down a hill into the half-frozen creek. Since a touchdown was at stake, members of both teams dove into the icy waters to recover the ball. A member of the OU team came out with the ball and downed it for a touchdown, eventually winning the game 75–0.[2] Thus was the beginning of Bedlam.

Author Steve Budin, whose father was a New York bookie, has recently publicized the claim that the 1954 "Bedlam" game against rival OU was fixed by mobsters in his book Bets, Drugs, and Rock & Roll (ISBN 1-60239-099-1). Allegedly, the mobsters threatened and paid off a cook to slip laxatives into a soup eaten by many OU Sooner starting players, causing them to fall violently ill in the days leading up to the game. OU was victorious in the end, but their 14–0 win did not cover the 20-point spread they had in their favor. However, many people involved in the 1954 contest do not recall any incident like the one purported by Budin to have occurred.

=== Tulsa ===
The Cowboys also have a rivalry with Tulsa. Oklahoma State leads Tulsa in the all-time series 44–28–5. Between 1990 and 2024, Oklahoma State was 15–3 versus Tulsa with the Cowboys scoring at least 28 points between 1999 and 2024. The Cowboys had a twenty-three game home winning streak against Tulsa, which was snapped in 2025. Previously, the last time Tulsa won in Stillwater was 1951.

== Facilities ==
Oklahoma State plays in Boone Pickens Stadium in Stillwater, Oklahoma. The original football field was inaugurated in 1913, and the first stand was built in 1920. At that time the field was repositioned from a north–south to an east–west configuration to avoid the strong prevailing winds of Northern Oklahoma. From 1914 until 2004, the stadium was named Lewis Field, named after popular professor and dean Laymon Lowery Lewis. Even though a stadium would not be built for six years after the field's inception, the students felt obliged to name their alma mater's field after their beloved "Dr. Lew".

By 1930 the capacity had risen to 13,000 and increased again in 1947. Major additions, including the first press box, brought the capacity to 30,000. In 1950 again seats were added and the total capacity increased to 39,000. The next renovations came in 1972 and for the next three decades the capacity hovered around 50,000.

In 2003, alumnus T. Boone Pickens made a historic donation to the university for improvements to its athletic facilities, and it was announced that the stadium would be renamed in his honor. The announcement of the renovation came after two consecutive victories over the Oklahoma Sooners in the Bedlam Series. To this day, Boone Pickens Stadium is one of a very few major college football stadiums with an east–west configuration. The latest renovation of the football stadium was completed in 2009, with the capacity at 60,218. In 2017, Oklahoma State renumbered and expanded the current seats, leaving the new capacity at 56,790 in an effort to increase seat width and improve the fan experience. In 2018, Oklahoma State installed a 6,160 square foot video board on the façade of Gallagher-Iba Arena in the stadium's east end zone. The jumbotron will be one of the ten largest in the country, placing it ahead of USC's jumbotron at Los Angeles Memorial Coliseum.

In 2007, plans to build the Sherman E. Smith Training Center were unveiled. The 92,000 square foot indoor practice facility was completed in 2013.

== Logos and uniforms ==
Throughout the 2000s, the Cowboys had four main uniform combinations. For the 2011 football season, it was revealed that Nike had created new uniforms for the Cowboys, offering three different helmet options in either gray, black, or white. New jerseys and pants consisting of black, orange, grey and white also came aboard, allowing for up to 48 different variations. The Cowboys debuted their new gray uniforms for the first game of the 2011 season. In a 2012 home game against Iowa State, the Cowboys debuted the new orange helmets, along with a new Pistol Pete decal. This would bring the different uniform combinations up to 64.

The uniform combinations are chosen before the season by a committee of players and the Cowboys equipment manager, Wes Edwards. A few patterns have evolved since the origination of the multiple uniform era. Thursday night games during 2009, 2010, 2011, and in 2014 have involved black uniforms. Another trend has the Cowboys reverting to the traditional White Helmet/Traditional Brand Logo/Orange Jersey/White Pants for the home opener in 2012, 2013, and 2014. Bowl games for the 2012 Fiesta Bowl, the 2013 Heart of Dallas Bowl, and the high-profile 2014 season opener in the Cowboys Classic featured Oklahoma State wearing all black.

During the 2012 season, fans saw the addition of the orange helmet, and the addition of new decals. For the first time since 1979, the Cowboys took the field in "All Orange" against Iowa State for Homecoming. Also during the 2012 season, new carbon fiber gray helmets replaced the matte gray that had been used in 2011. The Cowboys helmet logos include a Pistol Pete logo, as well as what fans refer to as "Phantom Pete". The "OSU" Branded logo was now featured in different variants, to reflect the helmet being worn. During 2013, OSU began incorporating a stripe down the center of their helmets for different variations. In 2014, OSU revealed two new helmet choices- a "classic Aggie" which paid homage to the bucking Aggie logo used in the 1940s and 1950s when the school was still called Oklahoma A&M Aggies. The other helmet was an Orange-Chrome with an oversized, off-center Pistol Pete. This was worn in a Thursday night victory over Texas Tech.

On May 10, 2023, the official Oklahoma State Football Twitter (or X.com) account released a video post touting new uniforms. A joint Nike, Inc. - Oklahoma State Football media release accompanied the post. The uniforms combine cutting edge Nike F.U.S.E technology with a 1980s OSU aesthetic. The uniforms use 1980s striping, a variety of logos, and a modern "Wild West" typography developed internally by Oklahoma State in 2019 called Cimarron. This is the Cowboy's latest uniform update, with the last one being in 2016. Current helmet options include white, black, and orange shells with the OSU "brand" logo, the classic Pistol Pete image, or "Cowboys" written in script.

=== Past uniforms ===
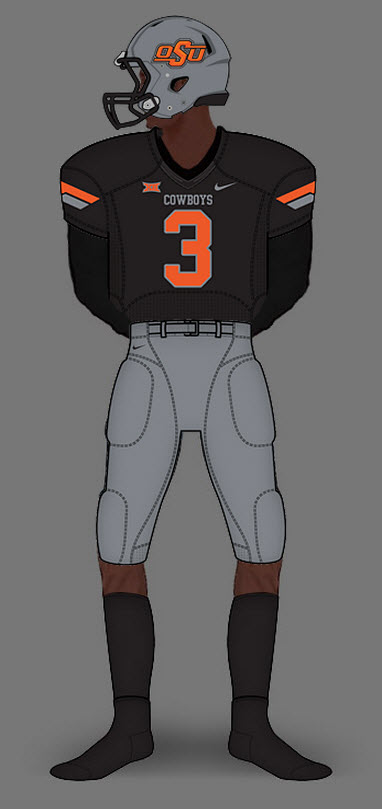
2011 vs. Kansas State

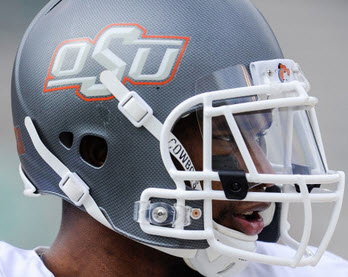
Carbon Fiber Helmet

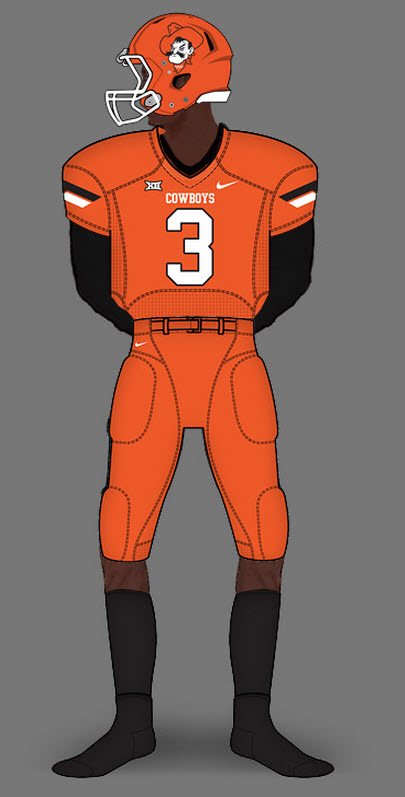
2012 Oklahoma State Uniform

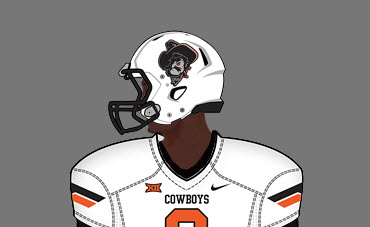
2013 Oklahoma State Uniform

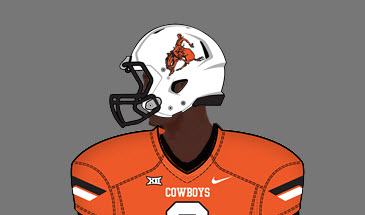
2014 Bucking Aggie Logo

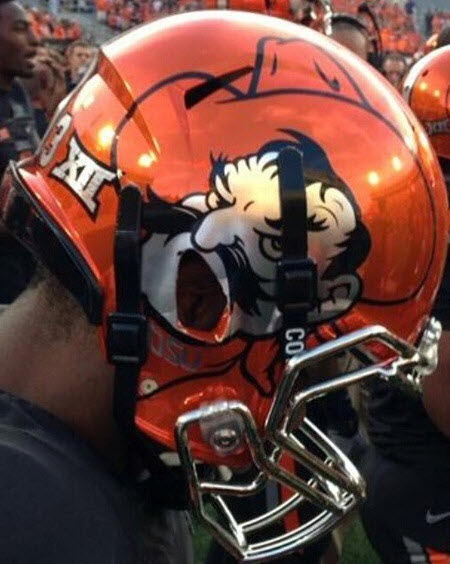
2014 Orange Chrome Pete

== Paddle people ==
The front rows of the student section have a tradition of hitting orange paddles against the padded sideline and end zone walls at home games. This tradition apparently started in the early 1990s (taking advantage of the notably small distance between the sidelines and stands at Lewis Field/Boone Pickens Stadium) and has since become an official group within the university. The orange paddles have the word "POKES" in the same font as Oklahoma State's logo written on them.

== Awards ==
=== Heisman Trophy ===
The Heisman Trophy is awarded annually to the nation's most outstanding college football player. One Oklahoma State player has won the Heisman Trophy: Barry Sanders. In addition, Terry Miller was runner-up in 1977.

| Year | Player | Position | Points | Notes |
|---|---|---|---|---|
| 1988 | Barry Sanders | Running back | 1,878 | |

=== Other awards ===
Walter Camp Award Collegiate football player of the year
| 1988 | Barry Sanders – RB |
Maxwell Award Best all-around college football player
| 1988 | Barry Sanders – RB |
Fred Biletnikoff Award Outstanding receiver
| 2010 | Justin Blackmon –WR |
| 2011 | Justin Blackmon – WR |
| 2017 | James Washington – WR |
Johnny Unitas Golden Arm Award Outstanding senior quarterback
| 2017 | Mason Rudolph – QB |

Lou Groza Award Top Collegiate placekicker
| 2010 | Dan Bailey – PK |
Ray Guy Award Top Collegiate Punter
| 2008 | Matt Fodge – P |
Doak Walker Award Top Running Back
| 2023 | Ollie Gordon II – RB |
Eddie Robinson Coach of the Year Award FWAA Coach of the Year
| 2011 | Mike Gundy – HC |

=== Ring of Honor ===
The Oklahoma State Football Ring of Honor was started in 2020 to honor distinguished former players. Located atop the west end zone of Boone Pickins Stadium is the names of the inductees and their retired jersey numbers. Five individuals have been inducted as of 2024, Thurman Thomas was the first inductee followed by Barry Sanders, Bob Fenimore, Terry Miller, and Leslie O'Neal.

| Year | No. | Player | Position | Career | Ref. |
|---|---|---|---|---|---|
| 2020 | 34 | Thurman Thomas | Running back | 1984–1987 | |
| 2021 | 21 | Barry Sanders | Running back | 1986–1988 | |
| 2022 | 55 | Bob Fenimore | Halfback | 1943–1946 | |
| 2023 | 43 | Terry Miller | Running Back | 1974–1977 | |
| 2024 | 99 | Leslie O'Neal | Defensive end | 1982–1985 | |
| 2025 | 81 | Justin Blackmon | Wide Receiver | 2008–2011 | |

=== All-Americans ===
Every year, several publications release rosters of the best college football players in the country. The athletes on these lists are referred to as All-Americans. The NCAA recognizes five All-American lists. They are the Associated Press, American Football Coaches Association, Football Writers Association of America, The Sporting News, and the Walter Camp Football Foundation. A consensus All-American is typically defined as a player who is named to at least three or more lists, while a unanimous All-American must be named to all five. Oklahoma State has had 66 All-Americans with 50 being first-team (20 Consensus, 8 unanimous) selections.

=== College Football Hall of Fame ===
Oklahoma State has 8 inductees in the College Football Hall of Fame (6 players, 2 coach). The first inductee was coach Pappy Waldorf, who was inducted in 1966. The most recent is Justin Blackmon, who was inducted in 2023.

| Inducted | Name | Position | Tenure |
|---|---|---|---|
| 1966 | Pappy Waldorf | Coach | 1929–1933 |
| 1972 | Bob Fenimore | Halfback | 1943–1946 |
| 2003 | Barry Sanders | Running back | 1986–1988 |
| 2008 | Thurman Thomas | Running back | 1984–1987 |
| 2012 | Jimmy Johnson | Coach | 1979–1983 |
| 2020 | Leslie O'Neal | Defensive end | 1982–1985 |
| 2022 | Terry Miller | Running back | 1974–1977 |
| 2023 | Justin Blackmon | Wide receiver | 2008–2011 |

== Cowboys in the NFL ==
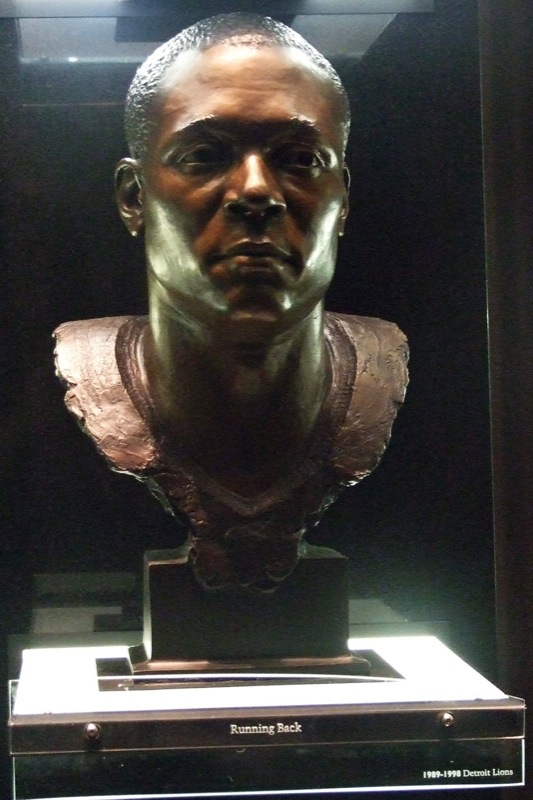
Barry Sanders statue, Pro Football Hall of Fame, College Football Hall of Fame & Oklahoma State Athletics Hall of Fame inductee

First round draft picks

| Name | Position | Year | Overall pick | Team |
|---|---|---|---|---|
| Barry Sanders | RB | 1989 | 3 | Detroit Lions |
| Justin Blackmon | WR | 2012 | 5 | Jacksonville Jaguars |
| Russell Okung | OT | 2010 | 6 | Seattle Seahawks |
| Dez Bryant | WR | 2010 | 24 | Dallas Cowboys |
| Teven Jenkins | OG | 2021 | 39 | Chicago Bears |

=== Active NFL ===
As of April 2026

- Justice Hill, Baltimore Ravens
- Chuba Hubbard, Carolina Panthers
- Teven Jenkins, Cleveland Browns
- Tylan Wallace, Cleveland Browns
- Tyler Lacy, Detroit Lions
- Malcolm Rodriguez, Detroit Lions
- Dalton Cooper, Green Bay Packers
- Collin Oliver, Green Bay Packers
- Josh Sills, Indianapolis Colts
- Brennan Presley, Los Angeles Rams
- Ollie Gordon, Miami Dolphins
- A. J. Green, Pittsburgh Steelers
- Korie Black, New York Giants
- Anthony Goodlow, Pittsburgh Steelers
- Mason Rudolph, Pittsburgh Steelers
- Jaylen Warren, Pittsburgh Steelers
- Nick Martin, San Francisco 49ers

== Future non-conference opponents ==
Announced schedules as of October 14, 2026.

| 2027 | 2028 | 2029 | 2030 | 2031 | 2032 | 2033 | 2034 | 2035 |
|---|---|---|---|---|---|---|---|---|
| Western Illinois | at Tulsa | Tulsa | Mississippi State | at Mississippi State | Arkansas | at Arkansas | at Nebraska | Nebraska |
| at Arkansas | Southeastern Louisiana | Lindenwood | at Tulsa | Tulsa | | | | |
| Tulsa | Michigan State | at Michigan State | | | | | | |
