= 1945 San Diego State Aztecs football team =

American college football season

1945 San Diego State Aztecs football
- Conference: Independent
- Record: 2–5
- Head coach: Bob Breitbard (1st season)
- Home stadium: Aztec Bowl

1945 Western college football independents records
	Conf.			Overall
Team	W	L	T	W		L		T
No. 7 Saint Mary's		–		7	–	2	–	0
Nevada		–		7	–	3	–	0
Fresno State		–		4	–	6	–	2
San Diego State		–		2	–	5	–	0
Cal Poly		–		1	–	5	–	1
Pacific (CA)		–		0	–	10	–	1
San Francisco State		–		0	–	2	–	0
Rankings from AP Poll

The 1945 San Diego State Aztecs football team represented San Diego State College—now known as San Diego State University—as an independent during the 1945 college football season. San Diego State had been a member of the California Collegiate Athletic Association (CCAA) in 1941, but the conference suspended operating during World War II. The Aztecs did not field a team in 1943 and 1944 due to the war. Led by John Eubank in his first and only season as head coach, the Aztecs compiled a record of 2–5 and were outscored by opponents 163 to 65 on the season. The team played home games at Balboa Stadium in San Diego.

== Schedule ==
Date	Time	Opponent	Site	Result	Attendance	Source
September 29		Redlands	Balboa Stadium; San Diego, CA	L 6–7	12,000	
October 6		Caltech	Balboa Stadium; San Diego, CA	L 20–32	12,500	
October 20		Arizona	Balboa Stadium; San Diego, CA	L 0–46	25,000	
October 27	8:00 p.m.	at Fresno State	Ratcliffe Stadium; Fresno, CA (rivalry)	W 7–0	5,861	
November 3		Pomona	Balboa Stadium; San Diego, CA	W 26–6	11,000	
November 11		at Nevada	Mackay Stadium (Note: This stadium is the predecessor to the current Mackay Stadium, which was opened for the 1966 season."University of Nevada, Reno; Mackay Stadium".); Reno, NV	L 6–44		
November 17		at Arizona	Arizona Stadium; Tucson, AZ	L 0–28		
All times are in Pacific time
