= Raisin Bowl =

Raisin Bowl (defunct)
- Stadium: Ratcliffe Stadium
- Location: Fresno, California
- Operated: 1946–1949

The Raisin Bowl was an annual post-season American college football bowl game played at Ratcliffe Stadium in Fresno, California, from 1946 to 1949. The first four games were played on January 1, the last on December 31. The games pitted a California team against an at-large team; the California team prevailed in four of the five games.

This game is not to be confused with the California Bowl which was later staged in Fresno, which in its later years was marketed as the California Raisin Bowl due to the sale of naming rights to the California Raisin Marketing Board.

== Game results ==
Date played	Winner		Loser		Location	Notes
January 1, 1946	Drake	13	Fresno State	12	Fresno, California	notes
January 1, 1947	San Jose State	20	Utah State	0	Fresno, California	notes
January 1, 1948	Pacific (CA)	26	Wichita†	14	Fresno, California	notes
January 1, 1949	Occidental	21	Colorado A&M‡	20	Fresno, California	notes
December 31, 1949	San Jose State	20	Texas Tech	13	Fresno, California	notes

† Now Wichita State
‡ Now Colorado State

== See also ==
- List of college bowl games
