= 1945 Cal Poly Mustangs football team =

American college football season

1945 Cal Poly Mustangs football
- Conference: Independent
- Record: 1–5–1
- Head coach: Ronnie Henderson (1st season)
- Home stadium: Mustang Stadium

1945 Western college football independents records
	Conf.			Overall
Team	W	L	T	W		L		T
No. 7 Saint Mary's		–		7	–	2	–	0
Nevada		–		7	–	3	–	0
Fresno State		–		4	–	6	–	2
San Diego State		–		2	–	5	–	0
Cal Poly		–		1	–	5	–	1
Pacific (CA)		–		0	–	10	–	1
San Francisco State		–		0	–	2	–	0
Rankings from AP Poll

The 1945 Cal Poly Mustangs football team represented California Polytechnic School—now known as California Polytechnic State University, San Luis Obispo—as an independent during the 1945 college football season. Led by Ronnie Henderson in his first and only season as head coach, Cal Poly compiled a record of 1–5–1. The team was outscored by its opponents 180 to 19 for the season and was shut out in four consecutive games. The Mustangs played home games at Mustang Stadium in San Luis Obispo, California.

== Schedule ==
Date	Time	Opponent	Site	Result	Attendance	Source
September 15		Fresno State	Mustang Stadium; San Luis Obispo, CA	T 6–6		
September 22		Caltech	Mustang Stadium; San Luis Obispo, CA	W 7–6		
October 6	8:00 p.m.	Camp Cooke	Mustang Stadium; San Luis Obispo, CA	L 0–46		
October 13		at Fresno State	Ratcliffe Stadium; Fresno, CA	L 0–24	6,398	
October 27	8:15 p.m.	at Santa Barbara Marines	La Playa Stadium; Santa Barbara, CA	L 0–42		
November 4		Minter Field	Mustang Stadium; San Luis Obispo, CA	L 0–19		
November 10		at Arizona	Arizona Stadium; Tucson, AZ	L 6–37	6,000	
All times are in Pacific time
