= 1945 Tulsa Golden Hurricane football team =

American college football season

1945 Tulsa Golden Hurricane football

Oil Bowl, L 6–20 vs. Georgia
- Conference: Missouri Valley Conference

Ranking
- AP: No. 17
- Record: 8–3 (2–1 MVC)
- Head coach: Henry Frnka (5th season)
- Home stadium: Skelly Field

1945 Missouri Valley Conference football standings
	Conf.					Overall
Team	W		L		T	W		L		T
No. 5 Oklahoma A&M $	1	–	0	–	0	9	–	0	–	0
No. 17 Tulsa	2	–	1	–	0	8	–	3	–	0
Wichita	1	–	1	–	0	6	–	4	–	0
Drake	1	–	2	–	0	5	–	4	–	1
Saint Louis	0	–	1	–	0	5	–	4	–	0
$ – Conference champion; Rankings from AP Poll

The 1945 Tulsa Golden Hurricane team represented the University of Tulsa during the 1945 college football season. In their fifth and final year under head coach Henry Frnka, the Golden Hurricane compiled an 8–2 record during the regular season with losses against undefeated eventual Big Ten Conference champion Indiana and undefeated Oklahoma A&M, a team that went on to win the 1946 Sugar Bowl. Tulsa closed the season with a loss to Georgia in the 1946 Oil Bowl in Houston.

== Schedule ==
Date	Time	Opponent	Rank	Site	Result	Attendance	Source
September 22		Wichita		Skelly Field; Tulsa, OK	W 61–0	10,000	
September 29	8:00 p.m.	West Texas State*		Skelly Field; Tulsa, OK	W 32–0	3,500	
October 6		Drake		Skelly Field; Tulsa, OK	W 19–0	10,000	
October 13		at Texas Tech*	No. 16	Tech Field; Lubbock, TX	W 18–7	9,000	
October 20		Nevada*	No. 18	Skelly Field; Tulsa, OK	W 40–0	16,000	
October 27		at No. 8 Indiana*	No. 14	Memorial Stadium; Bloomington, IN	L 2–7	20,000	
November 10		at No. 11 Oklahoma A&M	No. 19	Lewis Field; Stillwater, OK (rivalry)	L 6–12	18,000	
November 17		Baylor*^{†}	No. 19	Skelly Field; Tulsa, OK	W 26–7	15,000	
November 23		Arkansas*	No. 17	Skelly Field; Tulsa, OK	W 45–13	17,000	
December 1	2:00 p.m.	Hondo AAF	No. 14	Skelly Field; Tulsa, OK	W 20–18	6,000	
January 1, 1946		vs. No. 18 Georgia*	No. 17	Rice Field; Houston, TX (Oil Bowl)	L 6–20	27,000	
*Non-conference game; ^{†}Homecoming; Rankings from AP Poll released prior to the game; All times are in Central time

== Rankings ==
Ranking movements Legend: ██ Increase in ranking ██ Decrease in ranking — = Not ranked т = Tied with team above or below
	Week								
Poll	1	2	3	4	5	6	7	8	Final
AP	16	18	14	—	19	19	17	14т	17

== After the season ==
The following Golden Hurricane players were selected in the 1946 NFL draft following the season.

Round	Pick	Player	Position	NFL club
6	48	Felto Prewitt	Center	Philadelphia Eagles
17	157	Allen Smith	Back	Philadelphia Eagles
25	231	Tom Worthington	Tackle	Chicago Cardinals
25	233	Bob Verkins	Back	Pittsburgh Steelers
26	245	Barney White	End	New York Giants
