= 1945 Saint Louis Billikens football team =

American college football season

1945 Saint Louis Billikens football
- Conference: Missouri Valley Conference
- Record: 5–4 (0–1 MVC)
- Head coach: Dukes Duford (6th season)
- Home stadium: Walsh Stadium

1945 Missouri Valley Conference football standings
	Conf.					Overall
Team	W		L		T	W		L		T
No. 5 Oklahoma A&M $	1	–	0	–	0	9	–	0	–	0
No. 17 Tulsa	2	–	1	–	0	8	–	3	–	0
Wichita	1	–	1	–	0	6	–	4	–	0
Drake	1	–	2	–	0	5	–	4	–	1
Saint Louis	0	–	1	–	0	5	–	4	–	0
$ – Conference champion; Rankings from AP Poll

The 1945 Saint Louis Billikens football team was an American football team that represented Saint Louis University as a member of the Missouri Valley Conference (MVC) during the 1945 college football season. In its sixth season under head coach Dukes Duford, the team compiled a 5–4 record (0–1 against MVC opponents), finished fourth in the conference, and outscored opponents by a total of 194 to 139. The team played its home games at Walsh Stadium in St. Louis.

== Schedule ==
Date	Time	Opponent	Site	Result	Attendance	Source
September 28		Kirksville State*	Walsh Stadium; St. Louis, MO	W 96–6		
October 6		Missouri Mines*	Walsh Stadium; St. Louis, MO	W 32–0		
October 12		at Miami (FL)*	Burdine Stadium; Miami, FL	L 0–21	14,881	
October 20		Illinois Wesleyan	Walsh Stadium; St. Louis, MO	W 27–0		
October 26		Olathe NAS*	Walsh Stadium; St. Louis, MO	W 19–13	7,000	
November 3		Drake	Walsh Stadium; St. Louis, MO	L 0–25		
November 11	2:30 p.m.	Fort Riley*	Walsh Stadium; St. Louis, MO	W 14–7	7,000	
November 18		at Detroit*	University of Detroit Stadium; Detroit, MI	L 0–27	10,671	
November 22		at Marquette*	Marquette Stadium; Milwaukee, WI	L 6–40	7,500	
*Non-conference game; All times are in Central time
