= 1945 Nevada Wolf Pack football team =

American college football season

1945 Nevada Wolf Pack football
- Conference: Independent
- Record: 7–3
- Head coach: Jim Aiken (7th season)
- Home stadium: Mackay Field

1945 Western college football independents records
	Conf.			Overall
Team	W	L	T	W		L		T
No. 7 Saint Mary's		–		7	–	2	–	0
Nevada		–		7	–	3	–	0
Fresno State		–		4	–	6	–	2
San Diego State		–		2	–	5	–	0
Cal Poly		–		1	–	5	–	1
Pacific (CA)		–		0	–	10	–	1
San Francisco State		–		0	–	2	–	0
Rankings from AP Poll

The 1945 Nevada Wolf Pack football team was an American football team that represented the University of Nevada as an independent during the 1945 college football season. In their seventh under head coach Jim Aiken, the Wolf Pack compiled a 7–3 record.

The team included two veterans who had been injured in World War II and a former prisoner of war.

== Schedule ==
Date	Opponent	Site	Result	Attendance	Source
September 22	Idaho Marines	Mackay Field; Reno, NV	W 65–0	3,200	
September 29	at Utah	Ute Stadium; Salt Lake City, UT	W 33–14		
October 7	vs. Saint Mary's	Kezar Stadium; San Francisco, CA	L 0–39	60,000	
October 14	Santa Barbara Marines	Mackay Field; Reno, NV	W 19–12		
October 20	at Tulsa	Skelly Field; Tulsa, OK	L 0–40	16,000	
October 27	at California	California Memorial Stadium; Berkeley, CA	L 6–19	25,000	
November 3	Fresno State^{†}	Mackay Field; Reno, NV	W 7–4	15,000	
November 11	San Diego State	Mackay Field; Reno, NV	W 44–6		
November 18	Great Bend AAF	Mackay Field; Reno, NV	W 26–13		
November 25	vs. Las Vegas AAF	Butcher Memorial Stadium; Las Vegas, NV	W 40–0	5,000	
^{†}Homecoming
