= 1946 Sugar Bowl =

American college football game

- 12th Sugar Bowl
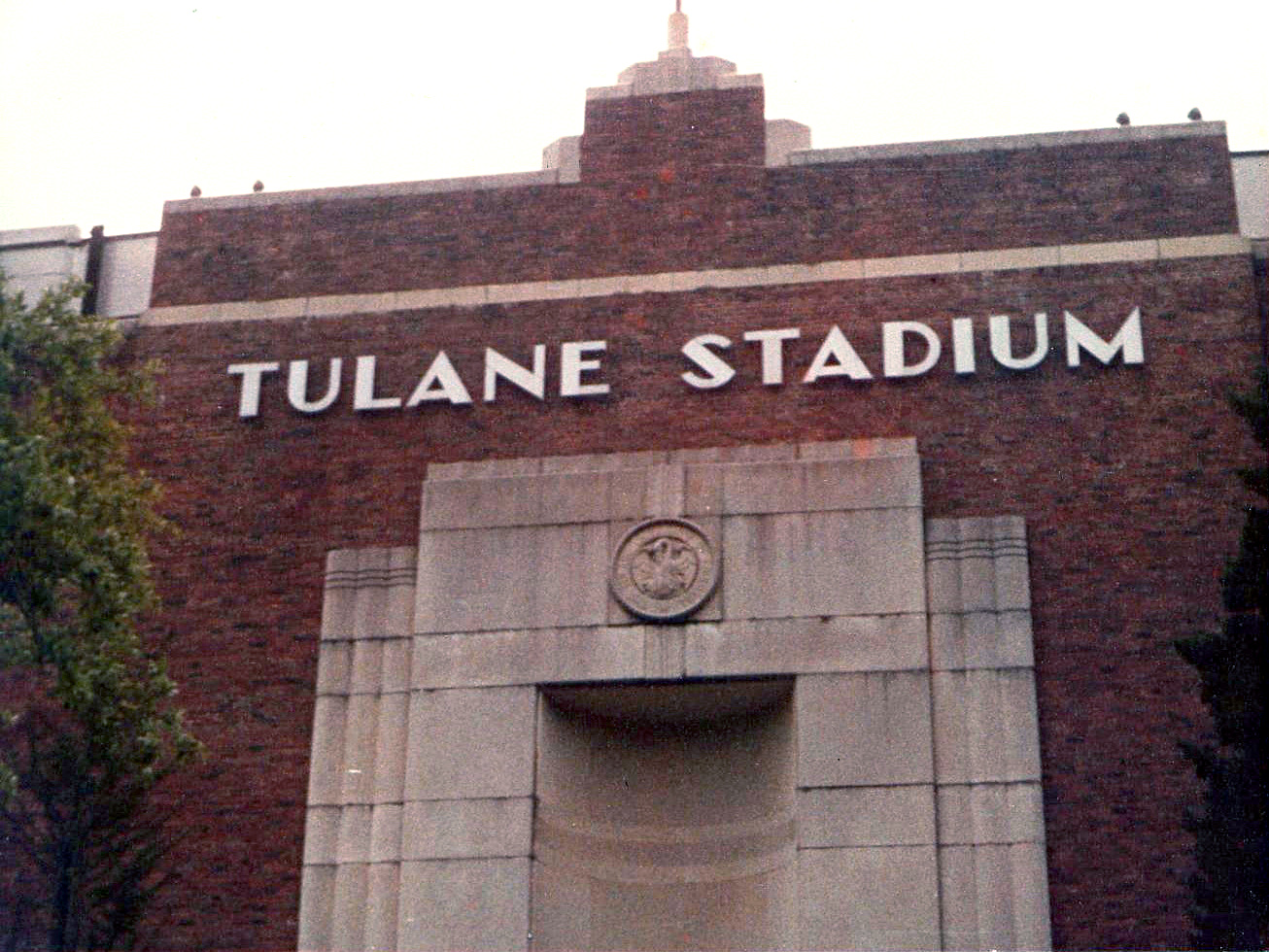
- Tulane Stadium in New Orleans, Louisiana, hosted the Sugar Bowl.
| Saint Mary's Gaels | Oklahoma A&M Cowboys |
| (7–1) | (8–0) |
| Independent | MVC |
| 13 | 33 |
| Head coach: James Phelan | Head coach: Jim Lookabaugh |
| AP 7 | AP 5 |
| | 1 | 2 | 3 | 4 | Total |
|---|---|---|---|---|---|
| Saint Mary's | 7 | 6 | 0 | 0 | 13 |
| Oklahoma A&M | 7 | 7 | 6 | 13 | 33 |
- Date: January 1, 1946
- Season: 1945
- Stadium: Tulane Stadium
- Location: New Orleans, Louisiana
- Favorite: Oklahoma A&M (–13)
- Referee: Bus Haskins
- Attendance: 68,822

The 1946 Sugar Bowl was the twelfth edition of the bowl game and matched the Oklahoma A&M Cowboys and the St. Mary's Gaels. It was played on Tuesday, January 1, 1946, at Tulane Stadium in New Orleans, Louisiana.

The radio broadcast was carried by the ABC network.

== Background ==
The undefeated Oklahoma A&M Aggies (later became Oklahoma State Cowboys) repeated as champions of the Missouri Valley Conference, and had won the previous year's Cotton Bowl. St. Mary's was a small independent from northern California that was making its second bowl appearance (1939 Cotton Bowl). The Gaels started the season 6–0 with notable wins over USC, California, and Nevada, before a loss to UCLA in the last game ending the unbeaten streak. Both teams were invited after Alabama (9–0) accepted the invitation to the Rose Bowl and undefeated Army continued their bowl abstinence.

== Game summary ==
The Gaels were small compared to the Aggies, being undersized by at least fifteen pounds (6.8 kg) to a team that averaged 203 pounds (92 kg) and that had war veterans such as Jim Reynolds and Burt Cole. But St. Mary's scored first on a Herman Wedemeyer touchdown pass to Denis O'Connor. Bob Fenimore responded with a touchdown pass to Cecil Haskins, and Fenimore scored on a touchdown run later in the half. Wedemeyer contributed to the Gaels' final touchdown as he lateraled to guard Carl DeSalvo, who ran 20 yards for a touchdown. But the kick failed, making it only 14–13 at halftime.

Fenimore and Reynolds added in touchdown runs in the second half as the lineman size started to make a difference, with St. Mary's four turnovers mattering more than Oklahoma A&M's. Joe Thomas caught a touchdown in the final five minutes to make the final score 33–13 as the Gaels were shut out in the second half, and the Cowboys won their second straight bowl game. Note: Denis O'Connor, St, Mary's QB also played both ways as did Wedemeyer and Fenimore, known as 60-Minute Men in the day. O'Connor on defense is tied for Sugar Bowl interceptions with three.

== Aftermath ==
After a Bowl appearance the following year in the Oil Bowl, played in Houston vs. Georgia Tech, the Gaels never qualified for a bowl game again, later playing in Division II and Division I-AA; the program was disbanded prior to the 2004 season. O'Connor (1944) and Wedemeyer (1943) both played in the East West Shrine All Star game.

The 1945 Oklahoma A&M football team was retroactively awarded the AFCA national championship and Coaches Trophy, the school’s first national title. The Cowboys did not return to the Sugar Bowl for seventy years, until January 2016.

== Statistics ==
| Statistics | SMC | A&M |
|---|---|---|
| First downs | 8 | 15 |
| Yards rushing | 61 | 217 |
| Yards passing | 166 | 112 |
| Total yards | 238 | 339 |
| Punts-Average | 5–43.0 | 4–47.2 |
| Fumbles-Lost | 2–2 | 0–0 |
| Interceptions | 2 | 4 |
