= 1945 Oklahoma A&M Cowboys football team =

American college football season

1945 Oklahoma A&M Cowboys football
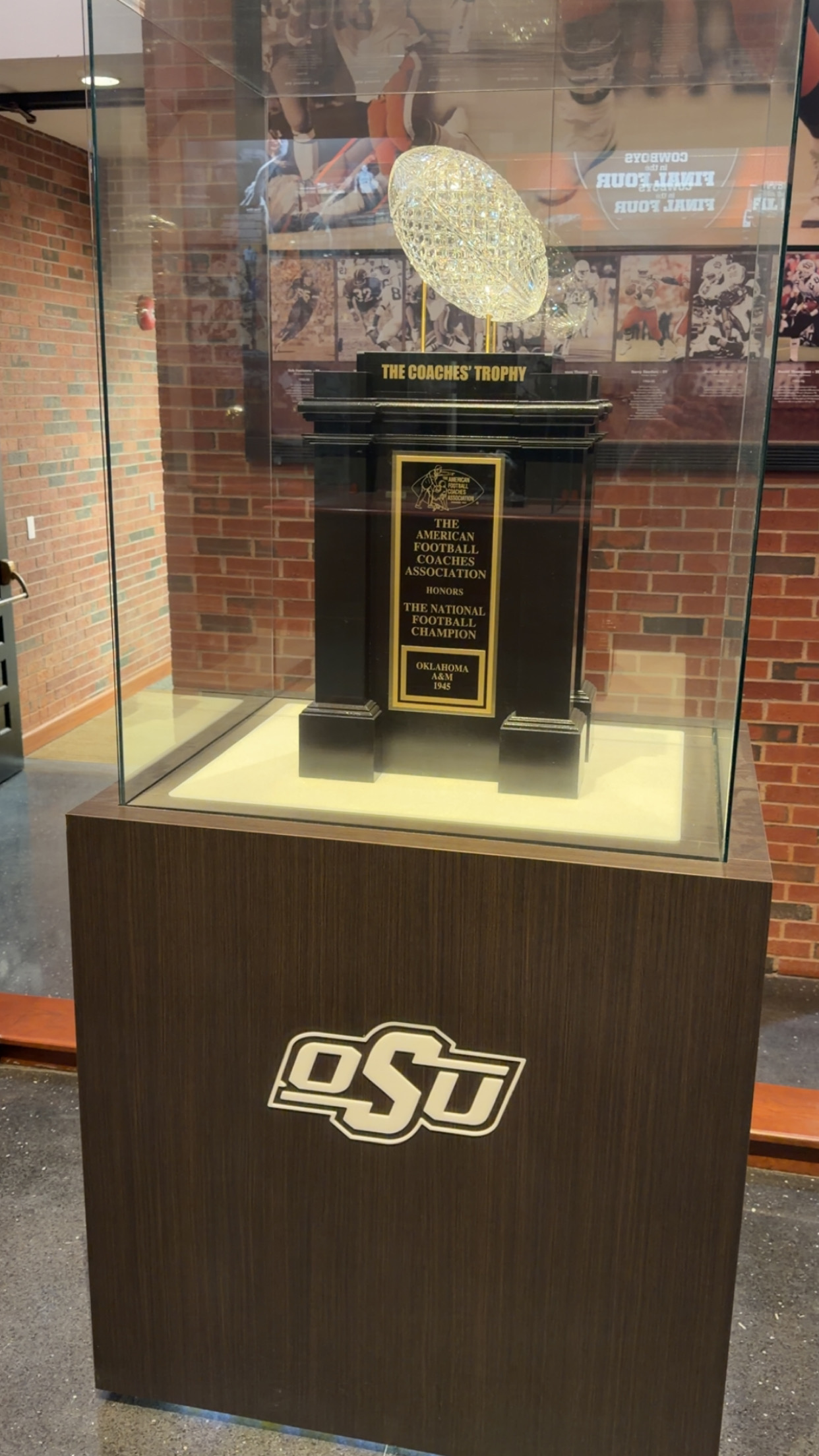
- 1945 AFCA National Championship Trophy awarded to Oklahoma State

National champion (AFCA) MVC champion Sugar Bowl champion

Sugar Bowl, W 33–13 vs. Saint Mary's
- Conference: Missouri Valley Conference

Ranking
- AP: No. 5
- Record: 9–0 (1–0 MVC)
- Head coach: Jim Lookabaugh (7th season)
- Home stadium: Lewis Field

1945 Missouri Valley Conference football standings
	Conf.					Overall
Team	W		L		T	W		L		T
No. 5 Oklahoma A&M $	1	–	0	–	0	9	–	0	–	0
No. 17 Tulsa	2	–	1	–	0	8	–	3	–	0
Wichita	1	–	1	–	0	6	–	4	–	0
Drake	1	–	2	–	0	5	–	4	–	1
Saint Louis	0	–	1	–	0	5	–	4	–	0
$ – Conference champion; Rankings from AP Poll

The 1945 Oklahoma A&M Cowboys football team represented Oklahoma Agricultural and Mechanical College (later renamed Oklahoma State University–Stillwater) in the Missouri Valley Conference during the 1945 college football season. The team was led by seventh-year head coach Jim Lookabaugh and played its home games at Lewis Field in Stillwater, Oklahoma.

Oklahoma A&M was awarded a retroactive national championship and The Coaches' Trophy by the AFCA after compiling a 9–0 record, winning the Missouri Valley championship, defeating Saint Mary's in the 1946 Sugar Bowl, and being ranked No. 5 in the final AP Poll. The 1945 season remains the only undefeated season in school history.

On offense, the 1945 team averaged 31.7 points, 286.9 rushing yards, and 133.5 passing yards per game. On defense, the team allowed an average of 8.4 points, 108.6 rushing yards and 79.6 passing yards per game. In addition, the Aggies also outscored all opponents by a combined total of 285 to 76.

Halfback Bob Fenimore led the nation with 1,048 rushing yards. He also led the team with 593 passing yards, 72 points scored, and seven interceptions. Fenimore was selected as a consensus first-team halfback on the 1945 All-America college football team. He was later inducted into the College Football Hall of Fame.

Three Oklahoma A&M players received first-team All-Missouri Valley Conference honors in 1945: Bob Fenimore, end Neill Armstrong, and lineman J. C. Colhouer.

In 2016, the American Football Coaches Association (AFCA), the organization responsible for the Coaches Poll, awarded Oklahoma A&M the 1945 national championship and The Coaches' Trophy. The AFCA tasked a Blue Ribbon Commission, consisting of former Baylor coach Grant Teaff, Georgia's Vince Dooley, and Texas A&M's R. C. Slocum, to award retroactive national titles for the years spanning 1922 to 1949 and invited schools to nominate their teams.

== Schedule ==
Date	Opponent	Rank	Site	Result	Attendance	Source
September 29	at Arkansas*		Razorback Stadium; Fayetteville, AR	W 19–14	10,000	
October 6	at Denver*		Hilltop Stadium; Denver, CO	W 31–7	20,000 (17,311 paid)	
October 12	vs. SMU*	No. 14	Taft Stadium; Oklahoma City, OK	W 26–12	18,500	
October 20	at Utah*	No. 15	Ute Stadium; Salt Lake City, UT	W 46–6		
October 27	at TCU*	No. 17	Amon G. Carter Stadium; Fort Worth, TX	W 25–12	15,000	
November 10	No. 19 Tulsa^{†}	No. 11	Lewis Field; Stillwater, OK (rivalry)	W 12–6	18,000	
November 17	Texas Tech*	No. 8	Lewis Field; Stillwater, OK	W 46–6	10,000	
November 24	at Oklahoma*	No. 6	Memorial Stadium; Norman, OK (Bedlam Series)	W 47–0	33,000	
January 1, 1946	vs. No. 7 Saint Mary's*	No. 5	Tulane Stadium; New Orleans, LA (Sugar Bowl)	W 33–13	75,000	
*Non-conference game; ^{†}Homecoming; Rankings from AP Poll released prior to the game

== Rankings ==
Ranking movements Legend: ██ Increase in ranking ██ Decrease in ranking
	Week								
Poll	1	2	3	4	5	6	7	8	Final
AP	14	15	17	9	11	8	6	6	5

== Roster ==
- Neill Armstrong
- A. L. Bennett
- M. L. "Bud" Brewton
- John Carey
- J. D. Cheek
- Bert Cole
- Jake Colhouer
- Mack Creager
- Bob DeMoss
- Ross Duckett
- Bob Faucette
- Bob Fenimore
- Jean M. Fitter
- Thurman Gay, Jr.
- Harvey Griffin
- Billy Grimes
- Cecil Hankins
- Bob Hargrove
- Bill Houck
- Sammy Howell
- George H. Ivie
- Ed Jeffers
- Afton Kelly
- Bill Long
- Alex Loyd
- Robert L. Memert
- Terry Monroe
- Glenn Moore
- Jim Parmer
- Jim Reynolds
- Otis Schellstede
- John Shelley
- Franklin Spruiell
- Joe Thomas
- Don E. Van Pool
- Nate J. Watson
- Wayne Weaver
- Edgar Welch
- Don Wiebener
- Marvin Wilkerson

== After the season ==
The 1946 NFL draft was held on January 14, 1946. The following Cowboys were selected.

Round	Pick	Player	Position	NFL team
8	66	Bert Cole	Tackle	Green Bay Packers
9	71	Jake Colhouer	Guard	Chicago Cardinals
20	182	Thurman Gay Jr.	Tackle	Chicago Bears
32	297	Otis Schellstede	Guard	Detroit Lions
