= 1946 Raisin Bowl =

- 1st Raisin Bowl
Drake Bulldogs	Fresno State Bulldogs
(4–4–1)	(4–5–2)
13	12
Head coach: Vee Green	Head coach: Alvin Pierson
	1	2	3	4	Total
Drake	6	0	0	7	13
Fresno State	0	6	0	6	12
- Date: January 1, 1946
- Season: 1945
- Stadium: Ratcliffe Stadium
- Location: Fresno, California
- MVP: Jack Coupe (Drake)
- National anthem: Marching bands
- Halftime show: Marching bands
- Attendance: 10,000

The 1946 Raisin Bowl was a college football bowl game played between Drake Bulldogs and Fresno State Bulldogs at Ratcliffe Stadium in Fresno, California. The game marked the first bowl game for Drake and the third for Fresno State. It was sponsored by the Fresno Chambers of Commerce, in the first Raisin Bowl.

== Game summary ==
The Drake took the early 6–0 first quarter lead on a Wallace Rooker one-yard run, but missed the PAT. Fresno State scored a second-quarter touchdown courtesy of a Jack Kelly 19-yard run, tying the game 6–6. The ensuing PAT was blocked by Drake, leading to a 6–6 halftime score. In the third quarter, the Bulldogs took their only lead of the game on a Mel Gustafson one-yard run. Fresno State again missed the PAT. The lead lasted only a quarter as a fourth quarter Drake touchdown pass from Jack Coupe to Charles McDowell set up the game winning extra point by Jim Baer. Fresno State set a bowl record of nine turnovers. The Drake defense intercepted six passes and recovered three fumbles in the 13–12 victory the game ended with a very close score.

== Aftermath ==
The victory wimproved Drake's bowl record to 1–0. Fresno State fell to 2–1 in bowl games. Drake became the first Iowa team to participate in a college football bowl game.

== Scoring summary ==
First quarter

Drake – Rooker 1-yard run (PAT failed)

Second quarter

Fresno State – Kelley 19 yard (PAT blocked)

Third quarter

Fresno State – Gustafson 1-yard run (PAT failed)

Fourth quarter

Drake – Coupe 24-yard pass to McDowell (Baer Kick)
