= 1945 Pacific Tigers football team =

American college football season

1945 Pacific Tigers football
- Conference: Independent
- Record: 0–10–1
- Head coach: Amos Alonzo Stagg (13th season)
- Home stadium: Baxter Stadium

1945 Western college football independents records
	Conf.			Overall
Team	W	L	T	W		L		T
No. 7 Saint Mary's		–		7	–	2	–	0
Nevada		–		7	–	3	–	0
Fresno State		–		4	–	6	–	2
San Diego State		–		2	–	5	–	0
Cal Poly		–		1	–	5	–	1
Pacific (CA)		–		0	–	10	–	1
San Francisco State		–		0	–	2	–	0
Rankings from AP Poll

The 1945 Pacific Tigers football team was an American football team that represented the College of the Pacific—now known as the University of the Pacific—in Stockton, California as an independent during the 1945 college football season. In their 13th season under head coach Amos Alonzo Stagg, the Tigers compiled a record of 0–10–1. The Tigers played home games at Baxter Stadium in Stockton.

== Schedule ==
Date	Time	Opponent	Site	Result	Attendance	Source
August 31	8:00 p.m.	Stockton AAF	Baxter Stadium; Stockton, CA	L 6–12		
September 7	8:00 p.m.	Camp Beale	Baxter Stadium; Stockton, CA	L 7–13	4,000	
September 14	8:00 p.m.	Santa Barbara Marines	Baxter Stadium; Stockton, CA	T 7–7		
September 21		Fresno State	Baxter Stadium; Stockton, CA	L 0–13		
September 28	8:00 p.m.	Saint Mary's Pre-Flight	Baxter Stadium; Stockton, CA	L 0–69		
October 5		at UCLA	Los Angeles Memorial Coliseum; Los Angeles, CA	L 0–50	10,000	
October 14		at No. 19 Saint Mary's	Kezar Stadium; San Francisco, CA	L 0–61	15,000	
October 20		at No. 14 USC	Los Angeles Memorial Coliseum; Los Angeles, CA	L 0–52	10,000	
November 17		Albany Navy	Baxter Stadium; Stockton, CA	L 13–18		
November 22		Fresno State	Baxter Stadium; Stockton, CA	L 0–16		
November 30		Stockton AAF	Baxter Stadium; Stockton, CA	L 0–6		
Rankings from AP Poll released prior to the game; All times are in Pacific time
