= 1945 San Francisco State Gators football team =

American college football season

1945 San Francisco State Gators football
- Conference: Independent
- Record: 0–2
- Head coach: Dan Farmer (6th season)
- Home stadium: Campus field

1945 Western college football independents records
	Conf.			Overall
Team	W	L	T	W		L		T
No. 7 Saint Mary's		–		7	–	2	–	0
Nevada		–		7	–	3	–	0
Fresno State		–		4	–	6	–	2
San Diego State		–		2	–	5	–	0
Cal Poly		–		1	–	5	–	1
Pacific (CA)		–		0	–	10	–	1
San Francisco State		–		0	–	2	–	0
Rankings from AP Poll

The 1945 San Francisco State Gatorsfootball team represented San Francisco State College—now known as San Francisco State University—as an independent during the 1945 college football season. San Francisco State did not field a team in 1943 or 1944. During this first post-World War II season, the team played a limited schedule. They were led by sixth-year head coach Dan Farmer, who had served as co-head coach from 1935 to 1938 and took over the team midway during the 1942 season. San Francisco State played home games at a field on campus in San Francisco, California, which was later named Cox Stadium. A search of newspapers from 1945 only finds the results for two games, although it is likely the team played more than that. In those two games, the Gators had a record 0–2 and were outscored by their opponents 64 to 0.

== Schedule ==
Date	Opponent	Site	Result	Source
October 13	at US Merchant Marine Cadets	San Mateo High School; San Mateo, CA	L 0–40	
October 19	San Francisco Junior College	Campus field; San Francisco, CA	L 0–24	
