= 1945 Saint Mary's Gaels football team =

American college football season

1945 Saint Mary's Gaels football

Sugar Bowl, L 13–33 vs. Oklahoma A&M
- Conference: Independent

Ranking
- AP: No. 7
- Record: 7–2
- Head coach: James Phelan (4th season)
- Home stadium: Kezar Stadium

1945 Western college football independents records
	Conf.			Overall
Team	W	L	T	W		L		T
No. 7 Saint Mary's		–		7	–	2	–	0
Nevada		–		7	–	3	–	0
Fresno State		–		4	–	6	–	2
San Diego State		–		2	–	5	–	0
Cal Poly		–		1	–	5	–	1
Pacific (CA)		–		0	–	10	–	1
San Francisco State		–		0	–	2	–	0
Rankings from AP Poll

The 1945 Saint Mary's Gaels football team was an American football team that represented Saint Mary's College of California during the 1945 college football season. In their fourth season under head coach and College Football Hall of Fame inductee James Phelan, the Gaels compiled a 7–2 record, outscored their opponents by a combined total of 282 to 65, and were ranked No. 7 in the final AP poll. The Gaels' victories included a 20–13 besting of California and a 26–0 victory over USC. Their only loss during the regular season was to UCLA by a 13–7 score. The Gaels were invited to play in the 1946 Sugar Bowl where they lost to undefeated and retroactive national champion Oklahoma A&M by a 33–13 score.

The team led the nation in passing offense with an average of 161.3 passing yards per game. College Football Hall of Fame inductee Herman Wedemeyer ranked second nationally with 1,040 passing yards.

Three Gaels received honors on the 1945 All-Pacific Coast football team: Wedemeyer at halfback (AP-1, UP-1); Charles Albert (Spike) Cordeiro, Jr. at halfback (UP-1); and Ed Ryan at end (AP-1, UP-1).

== Schedule ==
Date	Opponent	Rank	Site	Result	Attendance	Source
September 22	at California		California Memorial Stadium; Berkeley, CA	W 20–13	75,000	
September 30	vs. Stockton AAF		Kezar Stadium; San Francisco, CA	W 26–0	30,000	
October 7	vs. Nevada		Kezar Stadium; San Francisco, CA	W 39–0	60,000	
October 13	vs. Pacific (CA)	No. 19	Kezar Stadium; San Francisco, CA	W 61–0	15,000	
October 21	at McClellan Field	No. 11	Charles C. Hughes Stadium; Sacramento, CA	W 58–0		
November 3	at USC	No. 8	Los Angeles Memorial Coliseum; Los Angeles, CA	W 26–0	80,000	
November 12	at Fresno State	No. 5	Ratcliffe Stadium; Fresno, CA	W 32–6	15,000	
November 17	at UCLA	No. 5	Los Angeles Memorial Coliseum; Los Angeles, CA	L 7–13	87,000	
January 1	vs. No. 5 Oklahoma A&M	No. 7	Tulane Stadium; New Orleans, LA (Sugar Bowl)	L 13–33	75,000	
Rankings from AP Poll released prior to the game

== Rankings ==
Ranking movements Legend: ██ Increase in ranking ██ Decrease in ranking ( ) = First-place votes
	Week								
Poll	1	2	3	4	5	6	7	8	Final
AP	19	11	10 (1)	8 (2)	5 (2)	5 (4)	9	9	7
