= 1945 Wichita Shockers football team =

American college football season

1945 Wichita Shockers football
- Conference: Missouri Valley Conference
- Record: 6–4 (1–1 MVC)
- Head coach: Melvin J. Binford (2nd season)

1945 Missouri Valley Conference football standings
	Conf.					Overall
Team	W		L		T	W		L		T
No. 5 Oklahoma A&M $	1	–	0	–	0	9	–	0	–	0
No. 17 Tulsa	2	–	1	–	0	8	–	3	–	0
Wichita	1	–	1	–	0	6	–	4	–	0
Drake	1	–	2	–	0	5	–	4	–	1
Saint Louis	0	–	1	–	0	5	–	4	–	0
$ – Conference champion; Rankings from AP Poll

The 1945 Wichita Shockers football team represented the Municipal University of Wichita in the 1945 college football season. In their second and final year under head coach Melvin J. Binford, the Shockers compiled a 6–2 record during the season. The Shockers participated in their first year in the Missouri Valley Conference and compiled a 1–1 conference record en route to a third-place finish in conference play.

== Schedule ==
Date	Time	Opponent	Site	Result	Attendance	Source
September 15		Doane*	Wichita, KS	W 52–0		
September 22		at Tulsa	Skelly Field; Tulsa, OK	L 0–61	10,000	
September 29		at Kansas State*	Memorial Stadium; Manhattan, KS	L 6–13		
October 6		at Washburn*	Moore Bowl; Topeka, KS	W 0–14		
October 13		Central Missouri State*	Wichita, KS	W 25–0		
October 19		vs. Fort Riley*	El Dorado football field; El Dorado, KS	W 31–13	1,500	
October 27		Kansas*	Wichita, KS	L 0–13	10,000	
November 3		at Pittsburg State*	Brandenburg Stadium; Pittsburg, KS	W 40–9		
November 10	2:00 p.m.	Kearney AAF*^{†}	Wichita, KS	W 34–6	3,500	
November 22		Drake	Wichita, KS	W 19–13		
*Non-conference game; ^{†}Homecoming; All times are in Central time
