= Bob Breitbard =

American football coach and professional sports owner

Biographical details
- Born: April 28, 1919; San Diego, California, U.S.
- Died: May 17, 2010 (aged 91); San Diego, California, U.S.

Playing career

Football
- 1938–1940: San Diego State
- Position: Center

Coaching career (HC unless noted)

Football
- 1945: San Diego State

Administrative career (AD unless noted)
- 1967–1972: San Diego Rockets (owner)

Head coaching record
- Overall: 2–5

Robert Breitbard (April 28, 1919 – May 17, 2010) was an American football coach and professional sports owner. He served as the head football coach at San Diego State University in 1945. A member of the Greater San Diego Sports Council, Breitbard was instrumental in the construction of the San Diego Sports Arena. He was the first principal owner of the San Diego Rockets (later Houston Rockets) franchise of the National Basketball Association, which he owned from 1967 to 1972. He also owned the San Diego Gulls of the Western Hockey League.

== Head coaching record ==
| Year | Team | Overall | Conference | Standing | Bowl/playoffs |
|---|---|---|---|---|---|
San Diego State Aztecs (Independent) (1945)
| 1945 | San Diego State | 2–5 | | | |
| San Diego State: | | 2–5 | | | |
| Total: | | 2–5 | | | |

Sporting positions
| New creation | San Diego Rockets principal owner 1967–1971 | Succeeded by Billy Goldberg; Wayne Duddlesten; Mickey Herskowitz as Houston Rockets |
