= 1945 Fresno State Bulldogs football team =

American college football season

1945 Fresno State Bulldogs football

Raisin Bowl, L 12–13 vs. Drake
- Conference: Independent
- Record: 4–6–2
- Head coach: Alvin Pierson (1st season)
- Home stadium: Ratcliffe Stadium

1945 Western college football independents records
	Conf.			Overall
Team	W	L	T	W		L		T
No. 7 Saint Mary's		–		7	–	2	–	0
Nevada		–		7	–	3	–	0
Fresno State		–		4	–	6	–	2
San Diego State		–		2	–	5	–	0
Cal Poly		–		1	–	5	–	1
Pacific (CA)		–		0	–	10	–	1
San Francisco State		–		0	–	2	–	0
Rankings from AP Poll

The 1945 Fresno State Bulldogs football team represented Fresno State Normal School—now known as California State University, Fresno—as an independent during the 1945 college football season. Fresno State had been a member of the California Collegiate Athletic Association (CCAA) in 1941, but the conference suspended operations during World War II. Since some colleges were still not playing football in 1945, the Bulldogs played the Pacific Tigers and Cal Poly each twice. Led by first-year head coach Alvin Pierson Bulldogs compiled a record of 4–6–2 and outscored opponents 113 to 92 for the season. They shut out their opponent five times and were shut out in three games. At the end of the regular season season, Fresno State was invited to the Raisin Bowl, where the Bulldogs were defeated by the Drake Bulldogs, 13–12. Fresno State played home games at Ratcliffe Stadium on the campus of Fresno City College in Fresno, California.

== Schedule ==
Date	Time	Opponent	Site	Result	Attendance	Source
September 15		at Cal Poly	Mustang Stadium; San Luis Obispo, CA	T 6–6		
September 21		at Pacific (CA)	Baxter Stadium; Stockton, CA	W 13–0		
September 29	8:00 p.m.	Minter Field	Ratcliffe Stadium; Fresno, CA	T 0–0	6,782–9,000	
October 6		at Arizona State–Flagstaff	Skidmore Field; Flagstaff, AZ	W 19–0		
October 13		Cal Poly	Ratcliffe Stadium; Fresno, CA	W 24–0	6,398	
October 20		Santa Barbara Marines	La Playa Stadium; Santa Barbara, CA	L 0–6		
October 27	8:00 p.m.	San Diego State	Ratcliffe Stadium; Fresno, CA (rivalry)	L 0–7	5,861	
November 3		at Nevada	Mackay Stadium (Note: This stadium is the predecessor to the current Mackay Stadium, which was opened for the 1966 season.); Reno, NV	L 4–7	15,000	
November 12		Saint Mary's	Ratcliffe Stadium; Fresno, CA	L 6–32	13,357	
November 17	8:00 p.m.	Camp Beale	Knight Field; Marysville, CA	L 13–21		
November 22		at Pacific (CA)	Baxter Stadium; Stockton, CA	W 16–0		
January 1		Drake	Ratcliffe Stadium; Fresno, CA (Raisin Bowl)	L 12–13	10,000	
All times are in Pacific time
