= Melvin J. Binford =

American sports coach and administrator (1903–1984)

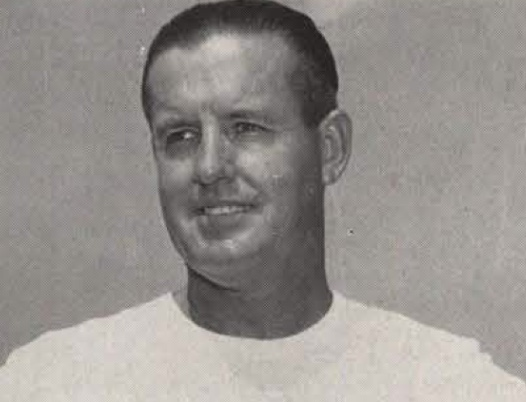
- Binford from the 1948 Parnassus

Biographical details
- Born: February 8, 1903; Kansas, U.S.
- Died: September 12, 1984 (aged 81); St. Petersburg, Florida, U.S.

Playing career

Football
- 1924–1925: Pittsburg State

Basketball
- 1923–1925: Pittsburg State

Coaching career (HC unless noted)

Football
- 1929: Hutchinson
- 1930–1935: McPherson
- 1936–1938: Oklahoma City (assistant)
- 1939–1941: El Dorado
- 1944–1945: Wichita

Basketball
- 1928–1930: Hutchinson
- 1930–1936: McPherson
- 1936–1939: Oklahoma City
- 1939–1942: El Dorado
- 1942–1948: Wichita

Administrative career (AD unless noted)
- 1930–1936: McPherson
- 1937–1939: Oklahoma City
- 1939–1942: El Dorado

Head coaching record
- Overall: 34–32–5 (college football); 16–16–2 (junior college football)

Melvin J. Binford (February 8, 1903 – September 12, 1984) was an American college football and college basketball coach and athletics administrator. He served as the head football coach at McPherson College in McPherson, Kansas from 1930 to 1935 and the Municipal University of Wichita—now known as Wichita State University—from 1944 to 1945.

== Coaching career ==
=== McPherson ===
Binford was the head football coach at McPherson College in McPherson, Kansas, serving for six seasons, from 1930 until 1935, and compiling a record of 23–26–4.

=== El Dorado ===
In 1939, McPherson was hired as athletic director and coach of all sports at El Dorado Junior College—now known as Butler Community College—in El Dorado, Kansas.

=== Wichita State ===
Binford was the 17th head football coach at the Municipal University of Wichita—now known as Wichita State University, serving for two seasons, from 1944 to 1945, and compiling a record of 11–6–1. Binford "re-started" the program after a one-year hiatus (1943) when the school did not field a team.

Binford was more successful as Wichita's fourteenth head basketball coach. He assumed the head coaching job for the 1942–43 season, then restarted the program after it was suspended for the 1943–44 season during World War II. He coached the Shockers' basketball team for a total of five seasons, building a record of 60–50.

== Later life and death ==
Binford moved to St. Petersburg, Florida in 1982 from Casa Grande, Arizona. He died on September 12, 1984, in St. Petersburg.

== Head coaching record ==
=== College football ===
Year	Team	Overall	Conference	Standing	Bowl/playoffs
McPherson Bulldogs (Kansas Collegiate Athletic Conference) (1930–1935)
1930	McPherson	1–7	0–4	5th	
1931	McPherson	2–6–1	1–2–1	T–4th	
1932	McPherson	3–6	0–4	5th	
1933	McPherson	7–2	3–1	2nd	
1934	McPherson	6–2–1	3–1–1	3rd	
1935	McPherson	4–3–2	2–1–2	3rd	
McPherson:		23–26–4	9–13–4		
Wichita Shockers (Independent) (1944)
1944	Wichita	5–2–1			
Wichita Shockers (Missouri Valley Conference) (1945)
1945	Wichita	6–4	1–1	3rd	
Wichita:		11–6–1	1–1		
Total:		34–32–5			

=== College basketball ===
Record table
Season	Team	Overall	Conference	Standing	Postseason
Oklahoma City Goldbugs (Independent) (1936–1939)
1936–37	Oklahoma City	23–8			
1937–38	Oklahoma City	7–15			
1938–39	Oklahoma City	10–8			
Oklahoma City:		40–31 (.563)			
Wichita Shockers (Independent) (1942–1945)
1942–43	Wichita	12–7			
1944–45	Wichita	14–6			
Wichita Shockers (Missouri Valley Conference) (1945–1948)
1945–46	Wichita	14–9	6–4	2nd	
1946–47	Wichita	8–17	2–10	7th	
1947–48	Wichita	12–13	1–9	6th	
Wichita:		60–52 (.536)	9–23 (.281)		
Total:		– (–)			

=== Junior college football ===
Year	Team	Overall	Conference	Standing	Bowl/playoffs
Hutchinson Blue Dragons (Kansas Junior College Conference) (1929)
1929	Hutchinson	3–4–1	2–2	T–5th	
Hutchinson:		3–4–1	2–2		
El Dorado Grizzlies (Kansas Junior College Conference) (1939–1941)
1939	El Dorado	4–4	3–4	7th	
1940	El Dorado	3–5–1	2–4–1	9th	
1941	El Dorado	6–3	6–2	4th	
El Dorado:		13–12–1	2–2		
Total:		16–16–2			
