= The Coaches' Trophy =

American football trophy

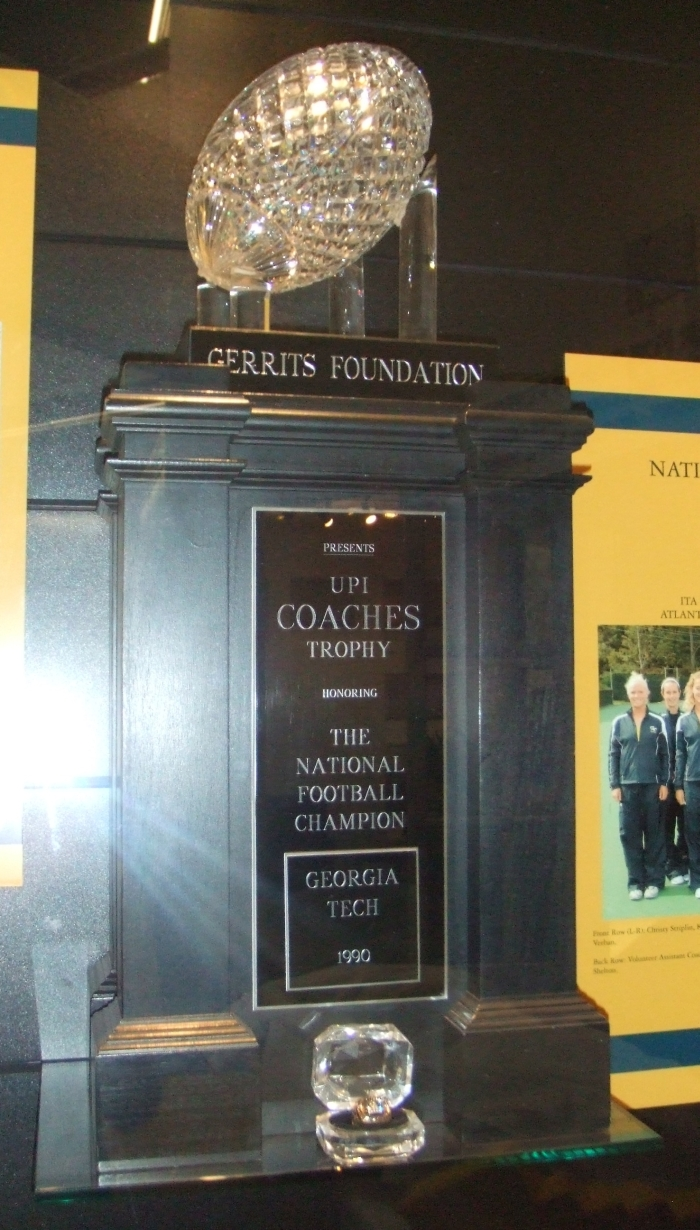
- Trophy awarded to the 1990 Georgia Tech Yellow Jackets
- Sport: College football
- League: Football Bowl Subdivision (FBS)
- Awarded for: National champion per final Coaches Poll each season
- Nickname: Crystal football
- Country: United States
- Presented by: American Football Coaches Association

History
- First award: 1986 (retroactively available to earlier top-ranked teams per Coaches Poll)
- Most wins: Alabama Crimson Tide (11)
- Most recent: Indiana Hoosiers
- Website: www.afca.com

The Coaches' Trophy (officially known as the AFCA National Championship Trophy and popularly as the "crystal football") is the trophy awarded annually by the American Football Coaches Association (AFCA) to the NCAA Division I Football Bowl Subdivision (FBS) national champion as determined by the Coaches Poll. The trophy has been presented since 1986 and was contractually given to the winner of the BCS National Championship Game and its predecessors from 1992 to 2013. Since then, it continues to be awarded to the top-ranked team in the final Coaches Poll of the season.

== History ==
Patrick and Michael Gerrits came up with the idea for a college football trophy to be awarded to the American Football Coaches Association (AFCA) national champions along with an academic scholarship award to a non-athlete. The intent was to honor the memory of the patriarch of the Gerrits family, Edward J. Gerrits. The trophy consists of a Waterford Crystal football affixed to an ebony base, and carries a value of over $30,000. The winning school retains permanent possession of the trophy, as a new one is awarded every year. The football portion of the trophy weighs approximately eight pounds and together with the stand, it weighs about 45 pounds (20 kg) and stands 34 inches (86 cm) tall. It is handmade by master craftspeople at Waterford Crystal and reportedly takes nearly three months to complete.

The official name is the American Football Coaches Association National Championship Trophy; it was given this permanent name by the association in 2006. In 2009, the AFCA allowed universities to buy replica trophies for any year a school finished first in the Coaches Poll, from the 1950 to 1985 seasons, prior to the trophy's creation in 1986. Around this time, the AFCA also began the process of awarding retroactive titles for the 1922 to 1949 seasons. The AFCA asked schools who felt they had a legitimate bid for the title to submit their reasons why so that their committee could hear the case and decide. Since then, TCU (1935, 1938), Texas A&M (1939), and Oklahoma State (1945) have received AFCA national championship selections and been awarded The Coaches’ Trophy.

Through the 1973 season, the final Coaches Poll was released in early December, after the regular season, but before postseason bowl games. Beginning with the 1974 season, the final poll has been conducted after the bowl games.

Throughout the eras of the Bowl Championship Series (BCS) and its predecessors (1992–2013), no separate national championship trophy was commissioned by those bodies, with the AFCA trophy serving that role. During the BCS era, the trophy was presented to the winning team in an on-field ceremony after the title game. With the end of the BCS, its successor playoff system, the College Football Playoff (CFP), commissioned a new trophy for its champion; officials wanted a new trophy that was unconnected with the previous championship system. However, coaches were "adamant" that the AFCA trophy continue to be awarded. Since the 2014 season, the trophy has been awarded to the team ranked No. 1 in the final Coaches Poll of the season in a celebration at that team's stadium sometime after the College Football Playoff National Championship.

== Sponsorship ==
The trophy has undergone several sponsorship changes over the years. It was sponsored by the Gerrits Foundation during the initial 1986 and 1987 seasons and, through the Gerrits' family Pepsi bottling business, Pepsi became a co-sponsor with the Gerrits Foundation in 1988 and 1989. Due to the poll's affiliation with the United Press International wire service, it was known as the Gerrits Foundation-UPI Coaches Trophy, the UPI Coaches Trophy or UPI Trophy during that time. McDonald's was the sole sponsor from 1990 to 1992. Sears began its sponsorship in 1993 and remained until 2001. Circuit City assumed the sponsorship for the 2002 season. ADT Security Services was the title sponsor from 2003 to 2005; and from 2009 to 2013, Dr Pepper sponsored the trophy. Since 2014, Amway has been the trophy sponsor.

== Coaches Poll national champions ==
Season	School	Head coach	AP poll champion (if different)
1950	Oklahoma	Bud Wilkinson	
1951	Tennessee	Robert Neyland	
1952	Michigan State	Biggie Munn	
1953	Maryland	Jim Tatum	
1954	UCLA	Red Sanders	Ohio State
1955	Oklahoma	Bud Wilkinson	
1956	Oklahoma	Bud Wilkinson	
1957	Ohio State	Woody Hayes	Auburn
1958	LSU	Paul Dietzel	
1959	Syracuse	Ben Schwartzwalder	
1960	Minnesota	Murray Warmath	
1961	Alabama	Bear Bryant	
1962	USC	John McKay	
1963	Texas	Darrell Royal	
1964	Alabama	Bear Bryant	
1965	Michigan State	Duffy Daugherty	Alabama
1966	Notre Dame	Ara Parseghian	
1967	USC	John McKay	
1968	Ohio State	Woody Hayes	
1969	Texas	Darrell Royal	
1970	Texas	Darrell Royal	Nebraska
1971	Nebraska	Bob Devaney	
1972	USC	John McKay	
1973	Alabama	Bear Bryant	Notre Dame
1974	USC	John McKay	Oklahoma
1975	Oklahoma	Barry Switzer	
1976	Pittsburgh	Johnny Majors	
1977	Notre Dame	Dan Devine	
1978	USC	John Robinson	Alabama
1979	Alabama	Bear Bryant	
1980	Georgia	Vince Dooley	
1981	Clemson	Danny Ford	
1982	Penn State	Joe Paterno	
1983	Miami (FL)	Howard Schnellenberger	
1984	BYU	LaVell Edwards	
1985	Oklahoma	Barry Switzer	
1986	Penn State	Joe Paterno	
1987	Miami (FL)	Jimmy Johnson	
1988	Notre Dame	Lou Holtz	
1989	Miami (FL)	Dennis Erickson	
1990	Georgia Tech	Bobby Ross	Colorado
1991	Washington	Don James	Miami (FL)
1992	Alabama	Gene Stallings	
1993	Florida State	Bobby Bowden	
1994	Nebraska	Tom Osborne	
1995	Nebraska	Tom Osborne	
1996	Florida	Steve Spurrier	
1997	Nebraska	Tom Osborne	Michigan
1998	Tennessee	Phillip Fulmer	
1999	Florida State	Bobby Bowden	
2000	Oklahoma	Bob Stoops	
2001	Miami (FL)	Larry Coker	
2002	Ohio State	Jim Tressel	
2003	LSU	Nick Saban	USC
2004	vacated (Note: USC was later stripped of its 2004 Coaches' Poll championship due to NCAA sanctions.)		USC
2005	Texas	Mack Brown	
2006	Florida	Urban Meyer	
2007	LSU	Les Miles	
2008	Florida	Urban Meyer	
2009	Alabama	Nick Saban	
2010	Auburn	Gene Chizik	
2011	Alabama	Nick Saban	
2012	Alabama	Nick Saban	
2013	Florida State	Jimbo Fisher	
2014	Ohio State	Urban Meyer	
2015	Alabama	Nick Saban	
2016	Clemson	Dabo Swinney	
2017	Alabama	Nick Saban	
2018	Clemson	Dabo Swinney	
2019	LSU	Ed Orgeron	
2020	Alabama	Nick Saban	
2021	Georgia	Kirby Smart	
2022	Georgia	Kirby Smart	
2023	Michigan	Jim Harbaugh	
2024	Ohio State	Ryan Day	
2025	Indiana	Curt Cignetti	

== Blue Ribbon Commission ==
In 2016, the AFCA tasked a "Blue Ribbon Commission" to select AFCA national champions and Coaches' Trophy winners for 1922–1949, representing the years between the establishment of the AFCA and the inaugural Coaches Poll in 1950.

The commission consisted of former college football coaches Grant Teaff, Vince Dooley, and R. C. Slocum.

Season	School	Head coach	AP poll champion (if different)
1935†	SMU	Matty Bell	none
1935†	TCU	Dutch Meyer	none
1938	TCU	Dutch Meyer	
1939	Texas A&M	Homer Norton	
1945	Oklahoma A&M	Jim Lookabaugh	Army
1946	Army	Earl Blaik	Notre Dame

† Photos of the trophies retroactively awarded to the TCU and SMU teams of 1935 show that different wording was used. The 1935 TCU trophy reads (in part) "The National Football Champions" while the 1935 SMU trophy reads (in part) "For Their Championship Season". Different NCAA-recognized selectors have honored different teams as national champions for the 1935 college football season.

== By team ==
Team	Number	Seasons
Alabama	11	1961, 1964, 1973, 1979, 1992, 2009, 2011, 2012, 2015, 2017, 2020
Oklahoma	6	1950, 1955, 1956, 1975, 1985, 2000
Ohio State	5	1957, 1968, 2002, 2014, 2024
USC	5	1962, 1967, 1972, 1974, 1978
LSU	4	1958, 2003, 2007, 2019
Nebraska	4	1971, 1994, 1995, 1997
Miami (FL)	4	1983, 1987, 1989, 2001
Texas	4	1963, 1969, 1970, 2005
Clemson	3	1981, 2016, 2018
Florida State	3	1993, 1999, 2013
Notre Dame	3	1966, 1977, 1988
Florida	3	1996, 2006, 2008
Georgia	3	1980, 2021, 2022
Michigan State	2	1952, 1965
Penn State	2	1982, 1986
TCU	2	1935,† 1938†
Tennessee	2	1951, 1998
Army	1	1946†
Auburn	1	2010
BYU	1	1984
Georgia Tech	1	1990
Maryland	1	1953
Michigan	1	2023
Minnesota	1	1960
Oklahoma State	1	1945†
Pittsburgh	1	1976
Syracuse	1	1959
Texas A&M	1	1939†
UCLA	1	1954
Washington	1	1991
Indiana	1	2025

† Retroactively awarded.
