= Jake Colhouer =

American football player (1922–1998)

No. 55, 63
- Position: Guard

Personal information
- Born: January 15, 1922; Altus, Oklahoma, U.S.
- Died: April 18, 1998 (aged 76); Lake Oswego, Oregon, U.S.
- Listed height: 6 ft 1 in (1.85 m)
- Listed weight: 225 lb (102 kg)

Career information
- High school: Warren (OK)
- College: Oklahoma State
- NFL draft: 1946: 9th round, 71st overall pick

Career history
- Chicago Cardinals (1946–1948); New York Giants (1949)

Awards and highlights
- NFL champion (1947)

Career NFL statistics
- Games played: 40
- Games started: 5
- Fumble recoveries: 4
- Stats at Pro Football Reference

Jacob C. Colhouer (January 15, 1922 – April 14, 1998) was an American professional football guard who played four seasons in the National Football League (NFL) with the Chicago Cardinals and New York Giants. He was selected by the Cardinals in the ninth round of the 1946 NFL draft after playing college football at Oklahoma State University.

== Early life ==
Colhouer attended Warren High School in Warren, Oklahoma.

== College career ==
Colhouer played for the Oklahoma State Cowboys. He graduated with an engineering degree.

== Professional career ==
Colhouer was selected by the Chicago Cardinals in the ninth round with the 71st overall pick in the 1946 NFL Draft. He played in 32 games, starting three, for the Cardinals from 1946 to 1948.

Colhouer played in eight games, starting two, for the New York Giants during the 1949 season.

== Personal life ==
Colhouer moved to Lake Oswego, Oregon in 1956 and owned and operated Colhouer Demolition Co. He was also co-founder of Community Bank in Lake Oswego and Lake Oswego Montessori School. He retired in 1983 and donated his business to the Oregon Association of Children and Adults with Learning Disabilities.
