= Sherman E. Smith Training Center =

Athletic facility in Stillwater, Oklahoma

Sherman Smith Training Center
- Location: West Hall of Fame Avenue & Hester Street, Stillwater, OK 74078
- Owner: Oklahoma State University
- Operator: Oklahoma State University
- Surface: 2 Astroturf fields (one inside one outside), 2 natural grass fields

Construction
- Opened: June 2013
- Cost: $19 million

Tenant
- Oklahoma State Cowboys (NCAA) (2013–present)

The Sherman E. Smith Training Center is an on-campus athletic training facility built on the campus of Oklahoma State University in Stillwater, Oklahoma.

The facility is named after Oklahoma State alumnus Sherman Smith, whose father founded Service Drilling Company of Tulsa and friend and former business partner of T. Boone Pickens. Smith donated $20 million to the Oklahoma State University athletics department to endow the maintenance and general upkeep of the facility. It is believed that the construction costs for the Training Center will be at least partially financed through the funds donated by Boone Pickens in early 2006.

The facility cost $19 million. The Training Center is capable of allowing indoor practices for several sports, including football, soccer, baseball, softball, and track & field. Three additional football practice fields, one astroturf with a north/south orientation and two natural grass surfaces, one north/south the other east/west are directly east Training Center. The Smith Training Center is built north of Hall of Fame Avenue, directly across from Boone Pickens Stadium.

Rather than constructing a simple inflatable practice structure or a utilitarian facility resembling an aircraft hangar, Oklahoma State officials sought to develop a modern training center that combined functionality with architectural consistency. The facility was designed to complement Boone Pickens Stadium, Gallagher-Iba Arena, and other areas of the Oklahoma State University campus through the use of modified Georgian architectural elements.

The area of 92,000 square feet (8,500 m^{2}) makes the Center one of the largest facility of its kind in the Big 12 Conference, equal with the current mark of 92,000 square feet (8,500 m^{2}) held by Iowa State University's Bergstrom Indoor Practice Facility. The Center's expansive area is large enough for an indoor playing surface large enough to accommodate regulation football and soccer fields. Another indoor facility designed specifically for the Oklahoma State track and field program is expected to be built in the coming years.
