= Bob Fenimore =

American football player (1925–2010)

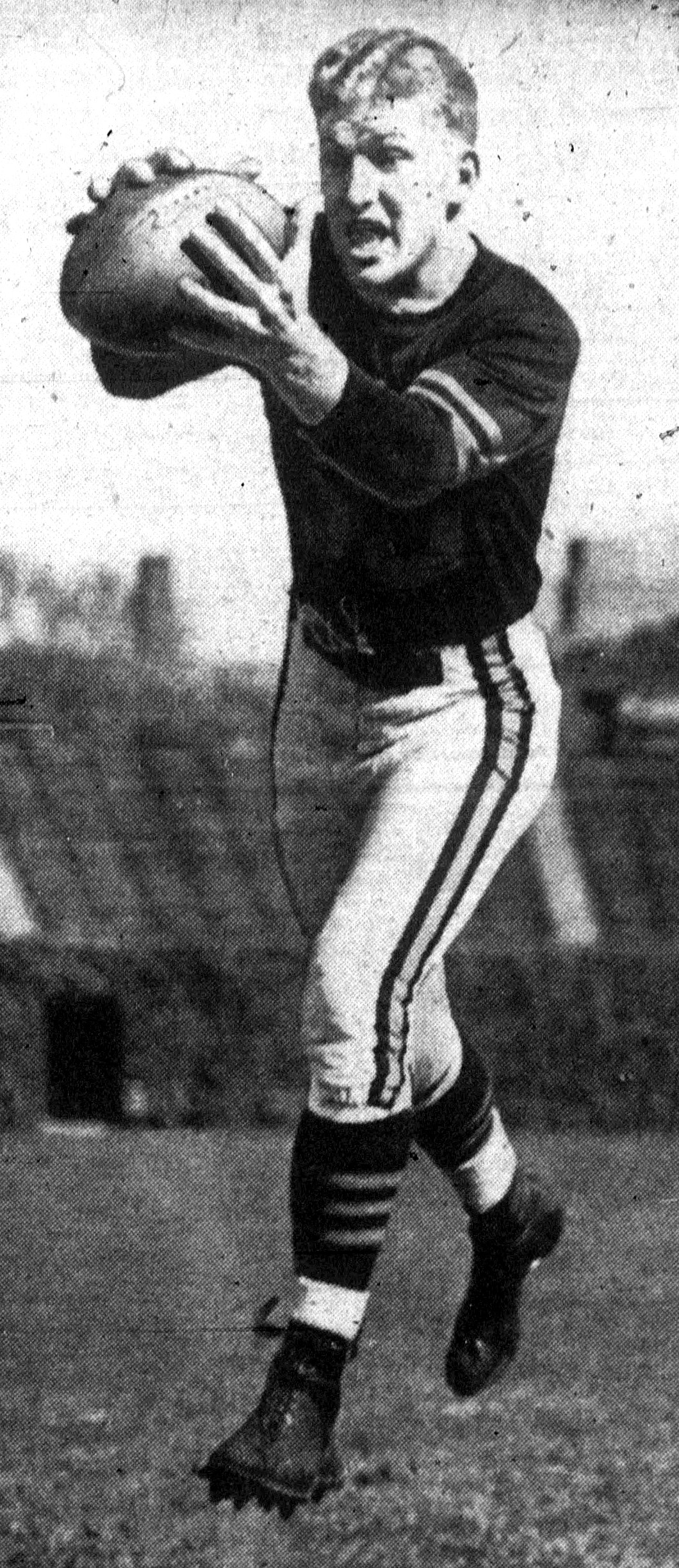
- Fenimore c. 1947

No. 55
- Position: Halfback

Personal information
- Born: October 6, 1925; Woodward, Oklahoma, U.S.
- Died: July 28, 2010 (aged 84); Stillwater, Oklahoma, U.S.
- Listed height: 6 ft 1 in (1.85 m)
- Listed weight: 190 lb (86 kg)

Career information
- High school: Woodward
- College: Oklahoma A&M (1943–1946)
- NFL draft: 1947: 1st round, 1st overall pick

Career history
- Chicago Bears (1947)

Awards and highlights
- National champion (1945); Consensus All-American (1945); First-team All-American (1944); Oklahoma State Cowboys No. 55 retired

Career NFL statistics
- Rushing yards: 189
- Rushing average: 3.6
- Rushing touchdowns: 1
- Receptions: 15
- Receiving yards: 219
- Receiving touchdowns: 2
- Stats at Pro Football Reference
- College Football Hall of Fame

Robert Dale Fenimore (October 6, 1925 – July 28, 2010), nicknamed "the Blonde Bomber" and "Blonde Blizzard", was an American professional football halfback who played in the National Football League (NFL) for one season with the Chicago Bears in 1947. He played college football for the Oklahoma A&M Cowboys and was selected first overall by the Bears in the 1947 NFL draft.

He was member of the 1945 national champion Oklahoma A&M team. He was the first twice All-American selection from Oklahoma A&M and finished third in the Heisman Trophy voting in 1945, but still led the nation in rushing with 142 carries for 1,048 yards.

== Early life ==
Bob Fenimore was born in Woodward, Oklahoma on October 6, 1925. As a youth, Fenimore was heavily involved with sports. His childhood home had a front yard that resembled a football field, sparking his early interest in the sport. Fenimore's interest in Oklahoma A & M (now Oklahoma State University) started early as well, even though his childhood sweetheart and later wife, Veta Jo, attended the University of Oklahoma.

Fenimore began his attendance at Oklahoma A & M in 1943, working toward a degree in education.

== College and professional career ==
As a player, he set many school records, including the career interception mark of 18 which still stands at Oklahoma State today. He was 195 pounds and could step the 100 yard dash in 9.7 compared with the world record at the time of 9.4. He led the nation in total offense in 1944 and in total offense and rushing in 1945 when he finished third in the Heisman Trophy voting behind Army's Glenn Davis and Doc Blanchard. The Aggies were 8-1 in 1944 and 9-0 in 1945—the only unbeaten/untied season in Oklahoma A&M/State football history.

Due to injuries, Fenimore played sparingly in the 1946 season and despite the risk, the Chicago Bears made Fenimore the first pick overall in the 1947 NFL draft. He would play only the 1947 season in Chicago appearing in 10 games.

In 1972 Fenimore was inducted into the College Football Hall of Fame. In 2007, Fenimore was inducted into the Cotton Bowl Hall of Fame. Fenimore became the third member to be inducted into Oklahoma State’s ring of honor in 2022.

== Personal life ==
After his football career, Fenimore returned to Oklahoma and went to work for Massachusetts Mutual Life insurance Company in Oklahoma City. In 1953 Fenimore and his family returned to Stillwater and worked for Mass Mutual financial services until he retired. Fenimore died on July 28, 2010.

== See also ==
- List of NCAA major college football yearly rushing leaders
- List of NCAA major college football yearly total offense leaders
