= Jim Lookabaugh =

American football player and coach (1902–1982)

- Lookabaugh pictured in The Redkskin 1942, Oklahoma A&M yearbook

Biographical details
- Born: June 16, 1902; Watonga, Oklahoma, U.S.
- Died: May 13, 1982 (aged 79); Oklahoma City, Oklahoma, U.S.

Playing career

Football
- 1924: Oklahoma A&M

Basketball
- 1925–1926: Oklahoma A&M

Baseball
- 1925: Oklahoma A&M

Coaching career (HC unless noted)
- 1925–1929: Jet HS (OK)
- 1930–1938: Capitol Hill HS (OK)
- 1939–1949: Oklahoma A&M

Head coaching record
- Overall: 58–41–6 (college)
- Bowls: 2–1

Accomplishments and honors

Championships
- 1 National (1945); 3 MVC (1944–1945, 1948)

Edwin Maurice "Jim" Lookabaugh (June 16, 1902 – May 13, 1982) was an American football player and coach. He served as the head football coach at Oklahoma Agricultural and Mechanical College—now known as Oklahoma State University–Stillwater—from 1939 to 1949, compiling a record of 58–41–6. Lookabaugh's 1945 Oklahoma A&M team went a perfect 9–0, winning the first national championship for Oklahoma A&M.

Lookabaugh was alumnus of Oklahoma A&M, lettering in baseball, basketball, and football. He is one of three head football coaches at Oklahoma State to have played for Oklahoma State, along with Floyd Gass and Mike Gundy. From 1925 to 1929, he coached at Jet High School, and from 1930 to 1938, he coached at Capitol Hill High School. He is a member of the OSU Alumni Hall of Fame, the OSU Athletic Hall of Fame, and the National Football Hall of Fame.

After retiring from coach in 1950, Lookabaugh worked in real estate and investments. He was the chairman of Oklahoma City's Urban Renewal Authority and served on other civic improvement committees for the city. He died in Oklahoma City, on May 13, 1982.

== Head coaching record ==
Year	Team	Overall	Conference	Standing	Bowl/playoffs	AP^{#}
Oklahoma A&M Cowboys (Missouri Valley Conference) (1939–1949)
1939	Oklahoma A&M	5–4–1	3–1	2nd		
1940	Oklahoma A&M	6–3–1	3–1	2nd		
1941	Oklahoma A&M	5–4	3–1	2nd		
1942	Oklahoma A&M	6–3–1	4–1	2nd		
1943	Oklahoma A&M	3–4	0–1	2nd		
1944	Oklahoma A&M	8–1	1–0	1st	W Cotton	
1945	Oklahoma A&M	9–0	1–0	1st	W Sugar	5
1946	Oklahoma A&M	3–7–1	1–1	T–3rd		
1947	Oklahoma A&M	3–7	0–2	5th		
1948	Oklahoma A&M	6–4	2–0	1st	L Delta	
1949	Oklahoma A&M	4–4–2	1–2–1	3rd		
Oklahoma A&M:		58–41–6	19–10–1			
Total:		58–41–6				
National championship Conference title Conference division title or championship game berth
^{#}Rankings from final AP Poll.
