= Ratcliffe Stadium =

Athletic venue

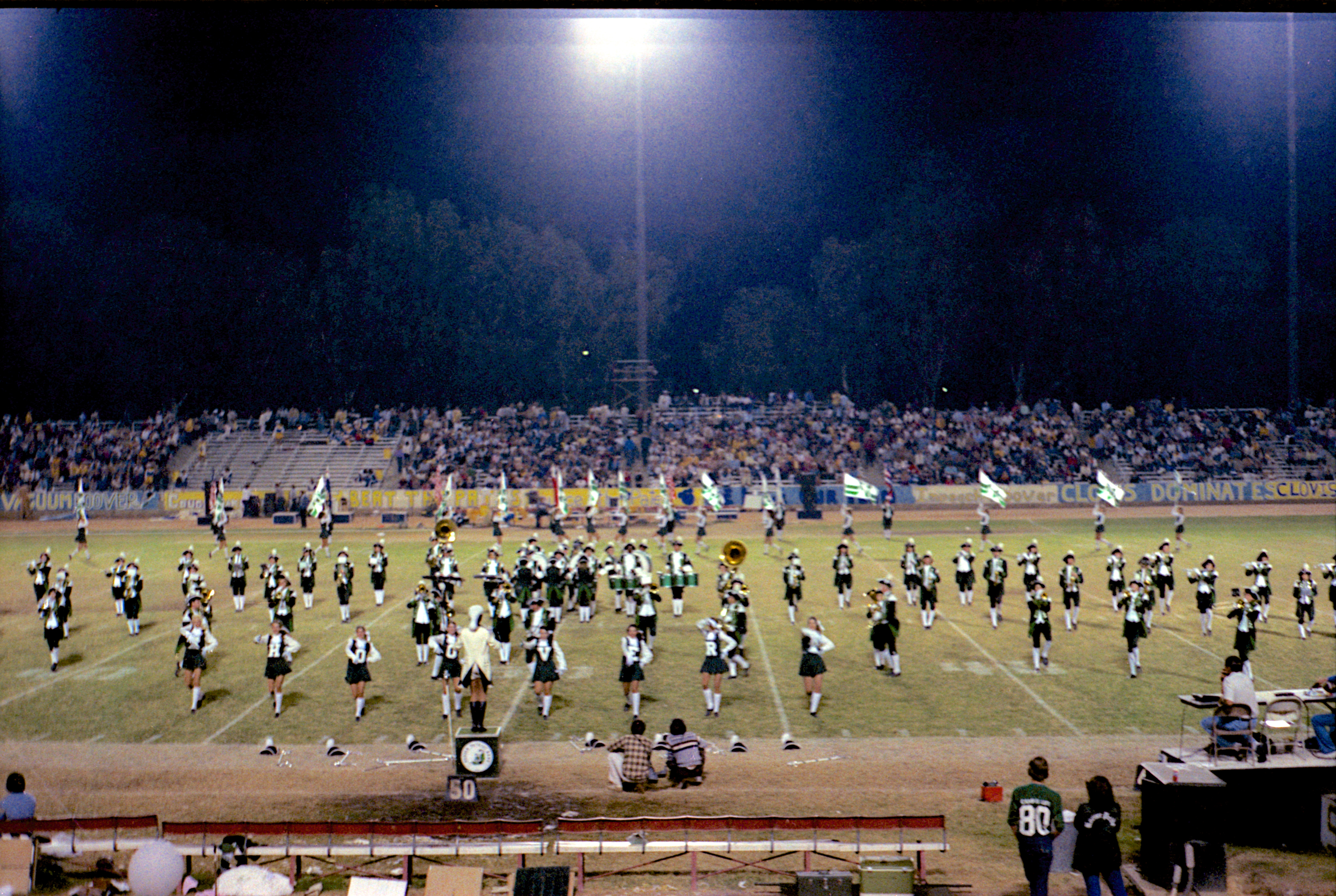
- Ratcliffe Stadium in 1981
- Interactive map of Ratcliffe Stadium
- Former names: Fresno State College Stadium (1926–1940)
- Location: 1101 E. University Ave; Fresno, California
- Coordinates: 36.768°N 119.789°W
- Owner: Fresno City College
- Operator: Fresno City College
- Capacity: 13,000
- Surface: Field: natural grass Track: polyurethane

Construction
- Opened: October 9, 1926; 99 years ago
- Renovated: 1976, 1986, 2009
- Expanded: 1942

Tenants
- Fresno City College Rams (1941–present); Fresno State Bulldogs (1926–1979)

Ratcliffe Stadium is a collegiate athletic venue in the western United States, located on the campus of Fresno City College in Fresno, California.

Opened in October 9, 1926, it was renamed in 1941 after their first football coach, Emory Ratcliffe. The stadium hosted the Raisin Bowl (1946–1949) and was home to the Fresno State Bulldogs football team through 1979; they moved to their on-campus Bulldog Stadium in 1980.

Ratcliffe also hosted the West Coast Relays, a major track and field competition. Today, local high school football games and various track and field events are still held there. The stadium has a seating capacity of 13,000, and it is located at 1101 E. University Avenue, along Blackstone Avenue.

The football field has a conventional north-south alignment, at an elevation of 300 feet (90 m) above sea level.

== Historical events ==
On June 2, 1964, Fresno Mayor Wallace D. Henderson marched with Martin Luther King Jr. and 1,000 persons from Fresno High School march Ratcliffe Stadium, where about 3,000 persons attended a rally that he spoke at regarding fair housing, desegregation and the Rumford Housing Act and in protest of California Proposition 14 (1964). It was organized as the Witness of Faith for Freedom Rally.

== See also ==
- Save Mart Center
- Chukchansi Park
