= 1946 Philadelphia Eagles season =

NFL team season

- Head coach: Greasy Neale
- Home stadium: Shibe Park

Results
- Record: 6–5
- Division place: 2nd NFL Eastern
- Playoffs: Did not qualify

The 1946 Philadelphia Eagles season was the Eagles' 14th in the league. The team failed to improve on its previous output of 7–3, winning only six games.

As a result, the team also failed to qualify for the playoffs for the 14th consecutive season.

== Off season ==
With the war restrictions over, the Eagles moved training camp from the West Chester State Teachers College (now West Chester University) in West Chester, Pennsylvania, to Saranac High School Field in (Saranac Lake, New York).

=== NFL draft ===
The 1946 NFL draft was held on January 14, 1946. The Eagles had the seventh or eighth picks in the thirty-two rounds of this draft. The top five teams in the league from the previous season were not awarded draft picks in rounds two or four, but were instead given compensatory, low value picks in the thirty-first and thirty-second rounds. As a result, the Eagles made thirty selections during this draft.

The overall number one pick in the draft was made by the Boston Yanks, which chose Frank Dancewicz, a quarterback from the University of Notre Dame.

=== Player selections ===
The table shows the Eagles selections, what picks they had that were traded away, and the teams that ended up with those picks. It is possible the Eagles' picks ended up with those teams via Eagles' trades with other teams. Not shown are acquired picks that the Eagles traded away.

= Pro Bowler	= Hall of Famer

Rd	Pick	Player	Position	School	.	Rd	Pick	Player	Position	School
1	8	Leo Riggs	Back	USC		2		No PICK		
3	23	Gordon Gray	Back	USC		4		No PICK		
5	37	Walt Slater	Back	Tennessee		6	48	Felto Prewitt	Center	Tulsa
7	57	George Robotham	End	UCLA		8	68	Jim Lecture	Guard	Northwestern
9	77	Ernie Lewis	Back	Colorado		10	88	Al Vandeweghe	End	William & Mary
11	97	Bill Iancelli	End	Franklin & Marshall		12	108	Pat McHugh	Back	Georgia Tech
13	117	John Wingender	Back	Washington		14	128	Homer Paine	Tackle	Tulsa
15	137	John Kerns	Tackle	Ohio		16	148	Buddy Hubbard	Back	William & Mary
17	157	Allen Smith	Back	Tulsa		18	168	Bernie Millham	End	Fordham
19	177	Lawrence Mauss	Center	Utah		20	188	Dave Butcher	Back	William & Mary
21	197	Don Fabling	Back	Colorado		22	208	George Feldman	Back	Tufts
23	217	Ed Cameron	Guard	Miami (FL)		24	228	Charley Steed	Back	Arkansas-Monticello
25	237	Ed Grygiel	Back	Dartmouth		26	248	Ben Raimondi	Back	Indiana
27	257	Sam Bailey	End	Georgia		28	268	Bob Long	Back	Tennessee
29	277	Bill Fisher	Tackle	Harvard		30	288	George Slusser	Back	Ohio State
31	292	John Itzel	Back	Pittsburgh		32	298	Larry Kirkman	Back	Boston University

== Schedule ==
Week	Date	Opponent	Result	Record	Venue	Attendance
1	September 29	at Los Angeles Rams	W 25–14	1–0	Los Angeles Memorial Coliseum	30,500
2	October 6	Boston Yanks	W 49–25	2–0	Shibe Park	33,986
3	October 13	Green Bay Packers	L 7–19	2–1	Shibe Park	36,127
4	October 20	at Chicago Bears	L 14–21	2–2	Wrigley Field	41,221
5	October 27	at Washington Redskins	W 28–24	3–2	Griffith Stadium	33,691
6	November 3	New York Giants	W 24–14	4–2	Shibe Park	40,059
7	November 10	at New York Giants	L 17–45	4–3	Polo Grounds	60,874
8	November 17	at Pittsburgh Steelers	L 7–10	4–4	Forbes Field	38,882
9	November 24	Washington Redskins	L 10–27	4–5	Shibe Park	36,633
10	December 1	Pittsburgh Steelers	W 10–7	5–5	Shibe Park	29,943
11	December 8	at Boston Yanks	W 40–14	6–5	Fenway Park	29,555

== Game recaps ==
=== Week 2 vs Boston Yanks ===
For the first time in Eagles franchise history a Head coach has a .500 winning percentage. By winning this game the Eagles are 25–25–4 under Greasy Neale. The Eagles would have a 63–43–5 record, 3 Championship games appearances and winning 2 of them, under Neale lifetime as coach of the Philadelphia Eagles.

Week 2: Philadelphia Eagles (2–0–0) vs Boston Yanks (0–2–0)

Quarter	1	2	3	4	Total
Yanks	12	0	6	7	25
Eagles	14	14	7	14	49

at Shibe Park on Grass,

- Date: October 6, 1946
- Game time: 1:00 p.m. EST
- Game weather: degrees, wind mph

Game information

1st quarter

- Eagles Jack Ferrante 48 yard pass from Roy Zimmerman (Augie Lio kick), Eagles 7 – 0
- Eagles Bosh Pritchard 68 yard rush (Augie Lio kick), Eagles 14 – 0
- Yanks John Grigas 1 yard rush (kick failed), Eagles 14 – 6
- Yanks Paul Governali 3 yard rush (kick failed), Eagles 14 – 12

2nd quarter

- Eagles Dick Humbert 7 yard pass from Allie Sherman (Augie Lio kick), Eagles 21 – 12
- Eagles Steve Van Buren 31 yard rush (Augie Lio kick), Eagles 28 – 12

3rd quarter

- Yanks Don Currivan 60 yard pass from Paul Governali (kick failed), Eagles 28 – 18
- Eagles Steve Van Buren 2 yard rush (Augie Lio kick), Eagles 35 – 18

4th quarter

- Eagles Bosh Pritchard 35 yard pass from Tommy Thompson (Augie Lio kick), Eagles 42 – 18
- Eagles Bert Kuczynski 9 yard pass from Tommy Thompson (Augie Lio kick), Eagles 49 – 18
- Yanks Hal Crisler 62 yard pass from Paul Governali (Nick Scollard kick), Eagles 49 – 25

Team Stats

- First downs – Bos 17 – Phila 21
- Rush-yards-TDs – Bos 26–59–2 – Phila 37–197–3
- Comp-Att-Yd-TD-INT – Bos 13–24–282–2–3 – Phila 14–18–208–4–1
- Sacked-yards – Bos 0–0 – Phila 0–0
- Net pass yards – Bos 282 – Phila 208
- Total yards – Bos 341 – Phila 405
- Fumbles-lost – Bos 2–1 – Phila 2–1
- Turnovers – Bos 4 – Phila 2
- Penalties-yards – Bos 7–55 – Phila 6–67

American Conference Standing

- Philadelphia (2–0–0)
- New York (2–0–0)
- Pittsburgh (1–1–1)
- Washington (0–1–1)
- Boston Yanks (0–2–0)

== Standings ==
NFL Eastern Division
	W	L	T	PCT	DIV	PF	PA	STK
New York Giants	7	3	1	.700	5–2–1	236	162	W1
Philadelphia Eagles	6	5	0	.545	5–3	231	220	W2
Pittsburgh Steelers	5	5	1	.500	4–3–1	136	117	L2
Washington Redskins	5	5	1	.500	4–3–1	171	191	L2
Boston Yanks	2	8	1	.200	0–7–1	189	273	L1

Note: Tie games were not officially counted in the standings until 1972.

== Roster ==
(All time List of Philadelphia Eagles players in franchise history)

= 1946 Pro All-Star
- + = 1st team All-Star

NO.	Player	AGE	POS	GP	GS	WT	HT	YRS	College
	Greasy Neale	55	Coach	_{1946 record} 6–5–0	_{NFL-Eagles; Lifetime} 29–30–4			6th	West Virginia Wesleyan
	Mel Bleeker	26	HB	4	0	189	5–11	2	USC
	Larry Cabrelli	29	E-DB	8	6	194	5–11	5	Colgate
	Jim Castiglia	28	FB	11	2	208	5–11	5	Georgetown (DC)
	Russ Craft	25	DB-HB	9	1	178	5–9	Rookie	Alabama
	Otis Douglas	35	T	11	0	224	6–1	Rookie	William & Mary
	John Eibner	32	T	9	0	228	6–2	5	Kentucky
	Jack Ferrante	30	E-DE	11	9	197	6–1	5	none
	Bob Friedlund	26	E	2	0	210	6–3	Rookie	Michigan State
	Ray Graves	28	C	7	0	205	6–1	4	_{Tennessee, and Tennessee Wesleyan College}
	Henry Gude	27	C-G	2	0	225	6–1	2	Vanderbilt
	Jack Hinkle	29	B	10	3	195	6–0	6	Syracuse
	Dick Humbert	28	E-DE	11	4	179	6–1	4	Richmond
	Bucko Kilroy	25	G-MG-T-DT	9	1	243	6–2	3	_{Notre Dame, and Temple}
	Ben Kish	29	B	10	2	207	6–0	6	Pittsburgh
	Pete Kmetovic	27	HB	5	0	175	5–9	Rookie	Stanford
	Bob Krieger	28	E	7	2	190	6–1	5	Dartmouth
	Bert Kuczynski	26	E	3	0	196	6–0	3	Pennsylvania
	Vic Lindskog	32	C	11	10	203	6–1	2	Stanford
	Augie Lio	28	G-T-PK	11	5	234	6–0	5	Georgetown (DC)
	Jay MacDowell	27	T-DE	6	0	217	6–2	Rookie	Washington
	Duke Maronic	25	G	11	11	209	5–9	2	none
	Flip McDonald	25	E	1	0	200	6–2	2	Oklahoma
	Bob McDonough	27	G	10	0	205	5–11	Rookie	Duke
	Eddie Michaels	32	G	10	5	205	5–11	10	Villanova
	Joe Muha	25	FB-LB	10	8	205	6–1	Rookie	Virginia Military Institute
	Elliott Ormsbee	25	HB	4	0	185	5–11	Rookie	Bradley
	Cliff Patton	23	G-LB	4	0	243	6–2	Rookie	TCU
	Bosh Pritchard	27	HB	11	5	164	5–11	4	_{Georgia Tech, and VMI}
	Vic Sears	28	T-DT	11	11	223	6–3	5	Oregon State
	Allie Sherman	23	QB	11	0	170	5–11	3	Brooklyn
	Rudy Smeja	26	E	11	1	195	6–2	2	Michigan
	Ernie Steele	29	HB-DB	9	4	187	6–0	4	Washington
	Gil Steinke	27	HB	10	0	175	6–0	1	Texas A&M-Kingsville
	Tommy Thompson	30	QB	10	3	192	6–1	6	Tulsa
	Steve Van Buren	26	HB	9	8	200	6–0	2	LSU
	Al Wistert+	26	T-G-DT	9	9	214	6–1	3	Michigan
	Alex Wojciechowicz	31	C-LB-E	7	1	217	5–11	8	Fordham
	John Wyhonic	27	G	11	2	213	6–0	Rookie	Alabama
	Roy Zimmerman	28	QB-WB-K	11	7	201	6–2	6	San Jose State
	41 Players; Team Average	27.6		11		202.6	6–0.3	3.1	

- Link to all time List of Philadelphia Eagles players in franchise history
