= 1946 Boston Yanks season =

National Football League team season

- Head coach: Herb Kopf
- Home stadium: Braves Field (first game); Fenway Park

Results
- Record: 2–8–1
- Division place: 5th NFL Eastern
- Playoffs: Did not qualify

The 1946 Boston Yanks season was their third in the National Football League. The team failed to improve on their previous season's output of 3–6–1, winning only two games. They failed to qualify for the playoffs for the third consecutive season. The season opener against the Giants was scheduled for Monday, September 30 at Braves Field. Due to heavy rain the game was rescheduled for and played on Tuesday October 1. This was the last NFL regular season game played on a Tuesday until the 2010 season.

== NFL draft ==
1946 Boston Yanks draft
Round	Pick	Player	Position	College	Notes
1	1	Boley Dancewicz	Quarterback	Notre Dame	
2	12	Nick Scollard	End	St. Joseph's (IN)	
3	17	Bob McClure	Guard	Nevada	Made roster in 1947
4	27	Jack Breslin	Back	Michigan State	
5	32	Gaston Bourgeois	Back	Tulane	
6	42	Thurman Tigart	Guard	Oklahoma	
7	52	Ed Mieszkowski	Tackle	Notre Dame	Signed with Brooklyn Dodgers (AAFC)
8	62	Chet Lipka	End	Boston College	
9	72	Al Dekdebrun	Back	Cornell	Signed with Buffalo Bisons (AAFC)
10	82	Rex John	Tackle	Wisconsin	
11	92	Bob West	Back	Colorado	
12	102	Max Dodge	End	Nevada	
13	112	Joe Kirkland	Tackle	Virginia	
14	122	Ralph Ventresco	Back	Penn State	
15	132	John Furey	Tackle	Boston College	
16	142	Bill Swiacki	End	Columbia	
17	152	Charley Tiedeman	Back	Brown	
18	162	Don Alverez	Guard	Dartmouth	
19	172	Jack Burns	Back	Temple	
20	182	Frank Ruggerio	Back	Notre Dame	
21	192	Jack Price	Back	Baylor	
22	202	Ike Igleheart	Guard	Tulane	
23	212	Bill Levitt	Center	Miami (FL)	
24	222	Mike Karmazin	Guard	Duke	Signed with New York Yankees (AAFC)
25	232	Chet Latcham	Guard	Denver	
26	242	Gordon Botsford	End	Boston University	
27	252	John Kauffman	Guard	Oregon	
28	262	Don Gleasner	End	Maryland	
29	272	Carl McKinnon	Guard	Dartmouth	
30	282	Nick Klutka	End	Florida	Signed with Buffalo Bisons (AAFC)
Made roster

== Schedule ==
Week	Date	Opponent	Result	Record	Venue	Attendance	Recap	Sources
1	October 1	**New York Giants**	**L** 0–17	0–1	Braves Field	16,500	Recap	
2	October 6	at **Philadelphia Eagles**	**L** 25–49	0–2	Shibe Park	33,986	Recap	
3	October 13	at **Pittsburgh Steelers**	**L** 7–16	0–3	Forbes Field	34,297	Recap	
4	October 20	**Washington Redskins**	**L** 6–14	0–4	Fenway Park	22,544	Recap	
5	October 27	**Pittsburgh Steelers**	**L** 7–33	0–5	Fenway Park	13,797	Recap	
6	November 3	Chicago Cardinals	**L** 14–28	0–6	Fenway Park	10,556	Recap	
7	November 10	at **Washington Redskins**	**L** 14–17	0–7	Griffith Stadium	33,691	Recap	
8	November 17	at **New York Giants**	**T** 28–28	0–7–1	Polo Grounds	35,583	Recap	
9	November 24	Los Angeles Rams	**W** 40–21	1–7–1	Fenway Park	23,698	Recap	
10	November 28	at Detroit Lions	**W** 34–10	2–7–1	Briggs Stadium	13,010	Recap	
11	December 8	**Philadelphia Eagles**	**L** 14–40	2–8–1	Fenway Park	29,555	Recap	
Note: Intra-division opponents are in **bold** text.

== Standings ==
NFL Eastern Division
	W	L	T	PCT	DIV	PF	PA	STK
New York Giants	7	3	1	.700	5–2–1	236	162	W1
Philadelphia Eagles	6	5	0	.545	5–3	231	220	W2
Pittsburgh Steelers	5	5	1	.500	4–3–1	136	117	L2
Washington Redskins	5	5	1	.500	4–3–1	171	191	L2
Boston Yanks	2	8	1	.200	0–7–1	189	273	L1

Note: Tie games were not officially counted in the standings until 1972.

== Roster ==
1946 Boston Yanks final roster
Quarterbacks: 22 Boley Dancewicz DB; 4 Paul Governali P; Backs: 10 Bob Davis DB/RB; 18 Babe Dimancheff RB/DB; 17 Gary Famiglietti FB/LB; 11 Jim Gillette DB/RB; 15 John Grigas LB/FB; 21 Joe Hoague DB/RB; 12 Sonny Karnofsky RB/DB; 16 Howard Maley RB/QB/P; 14 Mike Micka DB/RB; 19 Rudy Romboli LB/RB; Ends/Receivers: 24 Hal Crisler; 29 Don Currivan; 23 Sam Goldman; 27 Nick Scollard K; 25 George Tepo	Linemen/Linebackers: 35 John Badaczewski G/DG; 47 Ralph Calcagni DT/T; 45 Rocco Canale DG/G; 44 Tom Dean DT/T; 41 Don Deeks T; 32 Joe Domnanovich C/LB; 46 Rubin Juster T/DT; 28 Gene Lee C/LB; 34 Tony Leon G/DG; 30 Jim Magee C/LB; 40 Ed McGee T/DT; 43 Win Pedersen T/DT; 42 Steve Sierocinski T/DT; 33 Joe Zeno DG/G; rookies in italics
