= 1946 NFL draft =

National Football League draft

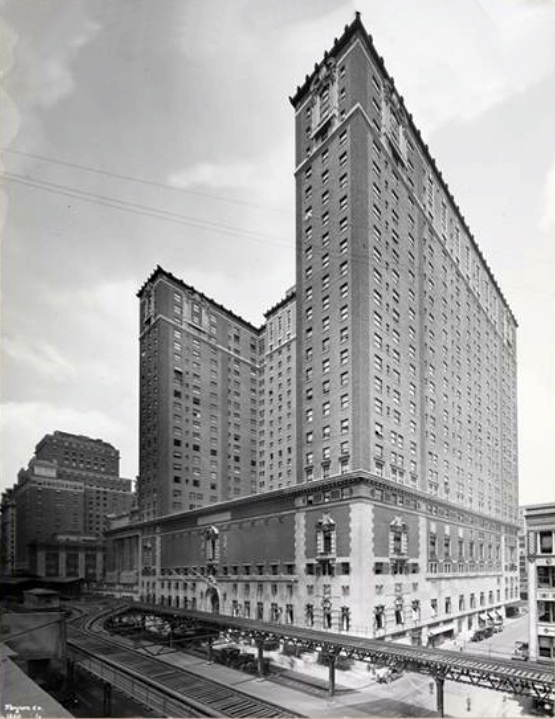
- Commodore Hotel (location of the draft)

General information
- Date: January 14, 1946
- Location: Commodore Hotel in New York City, NY

Overview
- 300 total selections in 32 rounds
- League: NFL
- First selection: Frank Dancewicz, QB; Boston Yanks
- Most selections (30): each team made 30 picks
- Fewest selections (30): each team made 30 picks
- Hall of Famers: 5: OT George Connor; C Frank Gatski; OT/K Lou Groza; FB Marion Motley; DT Bill Willis

The 1946 NFL draft was held on January 14, 1946, at the Commodore Hotel in New York City, New York.

The selections were initially withheld from the public out of fear that the newly formed All-America Football Conference would sign away players selected high. With the first overall pick of the draft, the Boston Yanks selected quarterback Frank Dancewicz. The most notable draft choice in this player selection meeting was made by the Washington Redskins and remains one of the biggest draft blunders of all time. They chose Cal Rossi with the 9th overall pick, but Rossi, a junior at UCLA, was not eligible to be drafted. They chose him again in the 1947 NFL draft, but he never played football professionally.

== Player selections ==
| = Pro Bowler | = Hall of Famer |

=== Round 1–6 ===
| Rnd. | Pick | Team | Player | Pos. | College | Notes |
|---|---|---|---|---|---|---|
| 1 | 1 | Boston Yanks | Frank Dancewicz | QB | Notre Dame | Bonus lottery pick |
| 1 | 2 | Chicago Cardinals | Dub Jones ^{†} | B | Tulane | |
| 1 | 3 | Pittsburgh Steelers | Doc Blanchard | FB | Army | |
| 1 | 4 | Chicago Bears | Johnny Lujack ^{†} | QB | Notre Dame | |
| 1 | 5 | New York Giants | George Connor^{‡}^{†} | T | Notre Dame | |
| 1 | 6 | Green Bay Packers | Johnny Strzykalski ^{†} | B | Marquette | |
| 1 | 7 | Philadelphia Eagles | Leo Riggs | B | USC | |
| 1 | 8 | Detroit Lions | Bill Dellastatious | B | Missouri | |
| 1 | 9 | Washington Redskins | Cal Rossi | B | UCLA | |
| 1 | 10 | Los Angeles Rams | Emil Sitko | HB | Notre Dame | |
| 2 | 11 | Chicago Cardinals | Mac Wenskunas | C | Illinois | |
| 2 | 12 | Boston Yanks | Nick Scollard | E | St. Joseph's (IN) | |
| 2 | 13 | Pittsburgh Steelers | George Clark | B | Duke | |
| 2 | 14 | Chicago Bears | Jules Rykovich | B | Illinois | |
| 2 | 15 | New York Giants | Elmer Jones | G | Wake Forest | |
| 3 | 16 | Chicago Cardinals | Elmer Angsman ^{†} | B | Notre Dame | |
| 3 | 17 | Boston Yanks | Buster McClure | T | Nevada | |
| 3 | 18 | Pittsburgh Steelers | Harmon Rowe | B | San Francisco | |
| 3 | 19 | Chicago Bears | Frank Broyles | QB | Georgia Tech | |
| 3 | 20 | New York Giants | Hosea Rodgers | B | North Carolina | |
| 3 | 21 | Green Bay Packers | Bob Nussbaumer | B | Michigan | |
| 3 | 22 | Detroit Lions | Russ Thomas | T | Ohio State | |
| 3 | 23 | Philadelphia Eagles | Gordon Gray | E | USC | |
| 3 | 24 | Washington Redskins | Stan Kozlowski | B | Holy Cross | |
| 3 | 25 | Los Angeles Rams | Don Samuel | B | Oregon State | |
| 4 | 26 | Chicago Cardinals | Hamilton Nichols | G | Rice | |
| 4 | 27 | Boston Yanks | Jack Breslin | B | Michigan State | |
| 4 | 28 | Pittsburgh Steelers | Joe Tepsic | B | Penn State | |
| 4 | 29 | Chicago Bears | Ernest Knotts | G | Duke | |
| 4 | 30 | New York Giants | Paul Duke | C | Georgia Tech | |
| 5 | 31 | Chicago Cardinals | Joe Golding | B | Oklahoma | |
| 5 | 32 | Boston Yanks | Gaston Bourgeois | B | Tulane | |
| 5 | 33 | Pittsburgh Steelers | Jack Seiferling | B | Utah State | |
| 5 | 34 | Chicago Bears | Don Schneider | B | Penn | |
| 5 | 35 | New York Giants | Pete Stout | B | TCU | |
| 5 | 36 | Green Bay Packers | Ed Cody | B | Purdue | |
| 5 | 37 | Philadelphia Eagles | Walt Slater | B | Tennessee | |
| 5 | 38 | Detroit Lions | Dave Harris | E | Wake Forest | |
| 5 | 39 | Washington Redskins | Gay Adelt | B | Utah | |
| 5 | 40 | Los Angeles Rams | Don Paul ^{†} | C | UCLA | |
| 6 | 41 | Chicago Cardinals | Len Dickey | T | Texas A&M | |
| 6 | 42 | Boston Yanks | Thurman Tigart | G | Oklahoma | |
| 6 | 43 | Pittsburgh Steelers | Marion Woods | G | Clemson | |
| 6 | 44 | Chicago Bears | Ted Scruggs | E | Rice | |
| 6 | 45 | New York Giants | Jim Lalikos | T | Brown | |
| 6 | 46 | Green Bay Packers | John Ferraro | T | USC | |
| 6 | 47 | Detroit Lions | Joe Eddins | G | Auburn | |
| 6 | 48 | Philadelphia Eagles | Felto Prewitt | C | Tulsa | |
| 6 | 49 | Washington Redskins | Walt Trojanowski | B | Connecticut | |
| 6 | 50 | Los Angeles Rams | Ace Oestreich | B | California | |

=== Round 7 ===
| Pick # | NFL team | Player | Position | College |
|---|---|---|---|---|
| 51 | Chicago Cardinals | Pat Lenshan | End | Tennessee |
| 52 | Boston Yanks | Ed Mieszkowski | Tackle | Notre Dame |
| 53 | Pittsburgh Steelers | Tom Reinhardt | Tackle | Minnesota |
| 54 | Chicago Bears | Wendell Beard | Tackle | California |
| 55 | New York Giants | Jim Plyler | Tackle | Texas |
| 56 | Green Bay Packers | Art Renner | End | Michigan |
| 57 | Philadelphia Eagles | George Robotham | End | UCLA |
| 58 | Detroit Lions | Pete Berezney | Tackle | Notre Dame |
| 59 | Washington Redskins | Bob Hendren | Tackle | USC |
| 60 | Los Angeles Rams | Dolly King | End | Georgia |

=== Round 8 ===
| Pick # | NFL team | Player | Position | College |
|---|---|---|---|---|
| 61 | Chicago Cardinals | Phil Tinsley | End | Alabama |
| 62 | Boston Yanks | Chet Lipka | End | Boston College |
| 63 | Pittsburgh Steelers | Joe Ponsetto | Back | Michigan |
| 64 | Chicago Bears | John Ziegler | Back | Colorado |
| 65 | New York Giants | Gene Roberts | Back | Chattanooga |
| 66 | Green Bay Packers | Bert Cole | Tackle | Oklahoma A&M |
| 67 | Detroit Lions | Keith DeCourcey | Back | Washington |
| 68 | Philadelphia Eagles | Jim Lecture | Guard | Northwestern |
| 69 | Washington Redskins | George Callanan | Back | USC |
| 70 | Los Angeles Rams | Joe Whisler | Back | Ohio State |

=== Round 9 ===
| Pick # | NFL team | Player | Position | College |
|---|---|---|---|---|
| 71 | Chicago Cardinals | Jake Colhouer | Guard | Oklahoma A&M |
| 72 | Boston Yanks | Al Dekdebrun | Back | Cornell |
| 73 | Pittsburgh Steelers | Bob Evans | Back | Penn |
| 74 | Chicago Bears | Walt Dropo | End | Connecticut |
| 75 | New York Giants | Mike Harris | Guard | Mississippi State |
| 76 | Green Bay Packers | Grant Darnell | Guard | Texas A&M |
| 77 | Philadelphia Eagles | Ernie Lewis | Back | Colorado |
| 78 | Detroit Lions | Bill Hedges | Tackle | West Texas State |
| 79 | Washington Redskins | Bob Skoglund | End | Notre Dame |
| 80 | Los Angeles Rams | Mike Schumchyk | End | Arkansas |

=== Round 10 ===
| Pick # | NFL team | Player | Position | College |
|---|---|---|---|---|
| 81 | Chicago Cardinals | Tom Barber | Tackle | Chattanooga |
| 82 | Boston Yanks | Rex John | Tackle | Wisconsin |
| 83 | Pittsburgh Steelers | Mel Bonwell | Back | Central (IA) |
| 84 | Chicago Bears | Bill Harris | Center | Auburn |
| 85 | New York Giants | Walt Clay | Back | Colorado |
| 86 | Green Bay Packers | Joe McAfee | Back | Holy Cross |
| 87 | Detroit Lions | Thornton Dixon | Tackle | Ohio State |
| 88 | Philadelphia Eagles | Al Vandeweghe | End | William & Mary |
| 89 | Washington Redskins | Jake Leicht | Back | Oregon |
| 90 | Los Angeles Rams | Joe Signaigo | Guard | Notre Dame |

=== Round 11 ===
| Pick # | NFL team | Player | Position | College |
|---|---|---|---|---|
| 91 | Chicago Cardinals | Dick Loepfe | Tackle | Wisconsin |
| 92 | Boston Yanks | Bob West | Back | Colorado |
| 93 | Pittsburgh Steelers | Doc Holloway | Guard | William & Mary |
| 94 | Chicago Bears | Eddie Allen | Back | Penn |
| 95 | New York Giants | Warren Amling | Guard | Ohio State |
| 96 | Green Bay Packers | Steve Conroy | Back | Holy Cross |
| 97 | Philadelphia Eagles | Bill Iancelli | End | Franklin & Marshall |
| 98 | Detroit Lions | Bob Stevens | Back | Oregon State |
| 99 | Washington Redskins | Chick Maggioli | Back | Illinois |
| 100 | Los Angeles Rams | Tom Phillips | Back | Ohio State |

=== Round 12 ===
| Pick # | NFL team | Player | Position | College |
|---|---|---|---|---|
| 101 | Chicago Cardinals | Venton Yablonski | Back | Columbia |
| 102 | Boston Yanks | Max Dodge | End | Nevada |
| 103 | Pittsburgh Steelers | Carroll Owen | Back | Catawba |
| 104 | Chicago Bears | Frank Bauman | End | Illinois |
| 105 | New York Giants | Al Bush | Tackle | Duke |
| 106 | Green Bay Packers | Bill Hildebrand | End | Mississippi State |
| 107 | Detroit Lions | Pat Farris | Tackle | Texas Tech |
| 108 | Philadelphia Eagles | Pat McHugh | Back | Georgia Tech |
| 109 | Washington Redskins | Monte Moncrief | Tackle | Texas A&M |
| 110 | Los Angeles Rams | Ted Strojny | Tackle | Holy Cross |

=== Round 13 ===
| Pick # | NFL team | Player | Position | College |
|---|---|---|---|---|
| 111 | Chicago Cardinals | Lee Lewis | Back | Washington |
| 112 | Boston Yanks | Joe Kirkland | Tackle | Virginia |
| 113 | Pittsburgh Steelers | George Poppin | Tackle | New Mexico |
| 114 | Chicago Bears | Reed Nostrum | Tackle | Utah |
| 115 | New York Giants | Bob Reiman | Back | Oregon State |
| 116 | Green Bay Packers | Tom Hand | Center | Iowa |
| 117 | Philadelphia Eagles | John Wingender | Back | Washington |
| 118 | Detroit Lions | Paul Copoulos | Back | Marquette |
| 119 | Washington Redskins | Joe Tereshinski | End | Georgia |
| 120 | Los Angeles Rams | George Strohmeyer | Center | Notre Dame |

=== Round 14 ===
| Pick # | NFL team | Player | Position | College |
|---|---|---|---|---|
| 121 | Chicago Cardinals | Bob Russell | Back | Miami (OH) |
| 122 | Boston Yanks | Ralph Ventresco | Back | Penn State |
| 123 | Pittsburgh Steelers | Bob McCain | End | Ole Miss |
| 124 | Chicago Bears | Dick Chatterton | Back | BYU |
| 125 | New York Giants | Bob Hazelhurst | Back | Denver |
| 126 | Green Bay Packers | George Hills | Guard | Georgia Tech |
| 127 | Detroit Lions | Ty Irby | Back | Auburn |
| 128 | Philadelphia Eagles | Homer Paine | Tackle | Tulsa |
| 129 | Washington Redskins | Stan Sprague | End | Illinois |
| 130 | Los Angeles Rams | Bob Palladino | Back | Notre Dame |

=== Round 15 ===
| Pick # | NFL team | Player | Position | College |
|---|---|---|---|---|
| 131 | Chicago Cardinals | Fred Rovai | Guard | Notre Dame |
| 132 | Boston Yanks | John Furey | Tackle | Boston College |
| 133 | Pittsburgh Steelers | Tom Tallchief | Tackle | Oklahoma |
| 134 | Chicago Bears | Johnny Timko | Center | Temple |
| 135 | New York Giants | Stan Stapley | Tackle | Utah |
| 136 | Green Bay Packers | Jim Hough | Back | Clemson |
| 137 | Philadelphia Eagles | John Kerns | Tackle | Ohio |
| 138 | Detroit Lions | Pat Thrash | End | South Carolina |
| 139 | Washington Redskins | Harry Adelman | End | USC |
| 140 | Los Angeles Rams | Dick Lorenz | End | Oregon State |

=== Round 16 ===
| Pick # | NFL team | Player | Position | College |
|---|---|---|---|---|
| 141 | Chicago Cardinals | Ray Evans | Tackle | Texas Western |
| 142 | Boston Yanks | Bill Swiacki | End | Columbia |
| 143 | Pittsburgh Steelers | Al Perl | Back | Youngstown State |
| 144 | Chicago Bears | Ted Hazelwood | Tackle | North Carolina |
| 145 | New York Giants | Nick Terlizzi | Tackle | Alabama |
| 146 | Green Bay Packers | Dean Gaines | Tackle | Georgia Tech |
| 147 | Detroit Lions | Kelly Mote | End | Duke |
| 148 | Philadelphia Eagles | Buddy Hubbard | Back | William & Mary |
| 149 | Washington Redskins | Bob Butchofsky | Back | Texas A&M |
| 150 | Los Angeles Rams | Larry Bouley | Back | Georgia |

=== Round 17 ===
| Pick # | NFL team | Player | Position | College |
|---|---|---|---|---|
| 151 | Chicago Cardinals | Bob Loubie | Back | Miami (OH) |
| 152 | Boston Yanks | Charley Tiedeman | Back | Brown |
| 153 | Pittsburgh Steelers | Russ Lopez | Center | West Virginia |
| 154 | Chicago Bears | Dick Johnson | Center | Baylor |
| 155 | New York Giants | Ray Justak | Guard | Northwestern |
| 156 | Green Bay Packers | J. P. Miller | Guard | Georgia |
| 157 | Philadelphia Eagles | Allen Smith | Back | Tulsa |
| 158 | Detroit Lions | Bill Scrugg | Back | Rice |
| 159 | Washington Redskins | Mike Prashaw | Tackle | Michigan |
| 160 | Los Angeles Rams | Gasper Urban | Guard | Notre Dame |

=== Round 18 ===
| Pick # | NFL team | Player | Position | College |
|---|---|---|---|---|
| 161 | Chicago Cardinals | Frank Irwin | Tackle | Duke |
| 162 | Boston Yanks | Don Alverez | Guard | Dartmouth |
| 163 | Pittsburgh Steelers | Buck Garrison | Guard | Wake Forest |
| 164 | Chicago Bears | Art Boettcher | Back | Shurtleff |
| 165 | New York Giants | Bob Morris | Back | USC |
| 166 | Green Bay Packers | Boyd Morse | End | Arizona |
| 167 | Detroit Lions | Ben Wall | Back | Central Michigan |
| 168 | Philadelphia Eagles | Bernie Millham | End | Fordham |
| 169 | Washington Redskins | Ed Robnett | Back | Texas Tech |
| 170 | Los Angeles Rams | Bob Wise | Guard | Colorado |

=== Round 19 ===
| Pick # | NFL team | Player | Position | College |
|---|---|---|---|---|
| 171 | Chicago Cardinals | Pride Ratterree | Guard | Wake Forest |
| 172 | Boston Yanks | Jack Burns | Back | Temple |
| 173 | Pittsburgh Steelers | Bill Cloud | Tackle | Temple |
| 174 | Chicago Bears | Tom Gallagher | Back | Illinois |
| 175 | New York Giants | Tom Loflin | End | LSU |
| 176 | Green Bay Packers | Joe Bradford | Center | USC |
| 177 | Philadelphia Eagles | Lawrence Mauss | Center | Utah |
| 178 | Detroit Lions | Merlin Kispert | Back | Minnesota |
| 179 | Washington Redskins | LaMar Dykstra | Back | Colorado |
| 180 | Los Angeles Rams | Jerry Ford | End | Notre Dame |

=== Round 20 ===
| Pick # | NFL team | Player | Position | College |
|---|---|---|---|---|
| 181 | Chicago Cardinals | Bill Heywood | Back | Notre Dame |
| 182 | Boston Yanks | Frank Ruggerio | Back | Notre Dame |
| 183 | Pittsburgh Steelers | Mike Garbinski | Back | Penn State |
| 184 | Chicago Bears | Johnny Adams | Back | Denver |
| 185 | New York Giants | Dick Kelly | Back | Minnesota |
| 186 | Green Bay Packers | Bill DeRosa | Back | Boston College |
| 187 | Detroit Lions | Don Malmberg | Tackle | UCLA |
| 188 | Philadelphia Eagles | Dave Butcher | Back | William & Mary |
| 189 | Washington Redskins | Bob Ward | Back | San Jose State |
| 190 | Los Angeles Rams | Bob Albrecht | Back | Marquette |

=== Round 21 ===
| Pick # | NFL team | Player | Position | College |
|---|---|---|---|---|
| 191 | Chicago Cardinals | Al Traught | Back | Miami (OH) |
| 192 | Boston Yanks | Jack Price | Back | Baylor |
| 193 | Pittsburgh Steelers | Charley Loiacano | Center | Lafayette |
| 194 | Chicago Bears | Dean Widseth | Tackle | Bemidji State |
| 195 | New York Giants | Mel Patton | Back | Santa Clara |
| 196 | Green Bay Packers | Ralph Grant | Back | Bucknell |
| 197 | Philadelphia Eagles | Don Fabling | Back | Colorado |
| 198 | Detroit Lions | Ned Maloney | End | Purdue |
| 199 | Washington Redskins | John Pehar | Tackle | USC |
| 200 | Los Angeles Rams | Cliff Lewis | Back | Duke |

=== Round 22 ===
| Pick # | NFL team | Player | Position | College |
|---|---|---|---|---|
| 201 | Chicago Cardinals | Clem Andrulewicz | Tackle | Villanova |
| 202 | Boston Yanks | Ike Igleheart | Guard | Tulane |
| 203 | Pittsburgh Steelers | George Johnson | Tackle | Pittsburgh |
| 204 | Chicago Bears | George Kochins | Tackle | Bucknell |
| 205 | New York Giants | Bill Stiers | Back | UCLA |
| 206 | Green Bay Packers | Howie Brown | Guard | Indiana |
| 207 | Detroit Lions | Jack Simmons | Back | Detroit |
| 208 | Philadelphia Eagles | George Feldman | Back | Tufts |
| 209 | Washington Redskins | Roger Robinson | Back | Syracuse |
| 210 | Los Angeles Rams | Bob Richardson | Tackle | Marquette |

=== Round 23 ===
| Pick # | NFL team | Player | Position | College |
|---|---|---|---|---|
| 211 | Chicago Cardinals | Adam Rakowski | End | Penn |
| 212 | Boston Yanks | Bill Levitt | Center | Miami (FL) |
| 213 | Pittsburgh Steelers | Bill Leitheiser | Guard | Duke |
| 214 | Chicago Bears | Al Hoisch | Back | Stanford |
| 215 | New York Giants | Vernon Hare | Back | Santa Clara |
| 216 | Green Bay Packers | Andy Kosmac | Center | LSU |
| 217 | Philadelphia Eagles | Ed Cameron | Guard | Miami (FL) |
| 218 | Detroit Lions | Joe Pulte | End | Detroit |
| 219 | Washington Redskins | Charley Cadenhead | Center | Mississippi State |
| 220 | Los Angeles Rams | Derald Lebow | Back | Oklahoma |

=== Round 24 ===
| Pick # | NFL team | Player | Position | College |
|---|---|---|---|---|
| 221 | Chicago Cardinals | Jack McKenzie | Back | Northwestern |
| 222 | Boston Yanks | Mike Karmazin | End | Duke |
| 223 | Pittsburgh Steelers | Roger Adams | Center | Florida |
| 224 | Chicago Bears | Visco Grgich | End | Santa Clara |
| 225 | New York Giants | Neil Scully | Back | Dayton |
| 226 | Green Bay Packers | Maurice Stacy | Back | Washington |
| 227 | Detroit Lions | Bob Funderberg | Back | Northwestern |
| 228 | Philadelphia Eagles | Charley Steed | Back | Arkansas–Monticello |
| 229 | Washington Redskins | Bob Rados | Guard | Santa Clara |
| 230 | Los Angeles Rams | Bill Lippincott | Back | Washington State |

=== Round 25 ===
| Pick # | NFL team | Player | Position | College |
|---|---|---|---|---|
| 231 | Chicago Cardinals | Tom Worthington | Tackle | Tulsa |
| 232 | Boston Yanks | Chet Latcham | Guard | Denver |
| 233 | Pittsburgh Steelers | Bob Verkins | Back | Tulsa |
| 234 | Chicago Bears | Allen Richards | Back | Cincinnati |
| 235 | New York Giants | George Miller | Tackle | Denver |
| 236 | Green Bay Packers | Chick Davidson | Tackle | Cornell |
| 237 | Philadelphia Eagles | Ed Grygiel | Back | Dartmouth |
| 238 | Detroit Lions | Ed Stacco | Tackle | Colgate |
| 239 | Washington Redskins | Charlie Webb | End | LSU |
| 240 | Los Angeles Rams | Kay Jamison | End | Florida |

=== Round 26 ===
| Pick # | NFL team | Player | Position | College |
|---|---|---|---|---|
| 241 | Chicago Cardinals | Jim Vugrin | Guard | Tennessee |
| 242 | Boston Yanks | Gordon Botsford | End | Boston University |
| 243 | Pittsburgh Steelers | Clarence Castle | Back | Ole Miss |
| 244 | Chicago Bears | Jess Tunstill | Back | Kentucky |
| 245 | New York Giants | Barney White | End | Tulsa |
| 246 | Green Bay Packers | John Norton | Back | Washington |
| 247 | Detroit Lions | Roger Anderson | Guard | Oregon State |
| 248 | Philadelphia Eagles | Ben Raimondi | Back | Indiana |
| 249 | Washington Redskins | Marion Flanagan | Back | Texas A&M |
| 250 | Los Angeles Rams | D. J. Gambrell | Center | Alabama |

=== Round 27 ===
| Pick # | NFL team | Player | Position | College |
|---|---|---|---|---|
| 251 | Chicago Cardinals | Jesse Herschbarger | End | SMU |
| 252 | Boston Yanks | John Kauffman | Guard | Oregon |
| 253 | Pittsburgh Steelers | Marchi Marino | Tackle | Penn State |
| 254 | Chicago Bears | Ken Smock | Back | Purdue |
| 255 | New York Giants | Butch Kalens | Guard | Illinois |
| 256 | Green Bay Packers | Ed Holtsinger | Back | Georgia Tech |
| 257 | Philadelphia Eagles | Sam Bailey | End | Georgia |
| 258 | Detroit Lions | Chuck Murdock | End | Georgia Tech |
| 259 | Washington Redskins | Roland Phillips | Tackle | Georgia Tech |
| 260 | Los Angeles Rams | Joe Ben Dickey | Back | Colorado |

=== Round 28 ===
| Pick # | NFL team | Player | Position | College |
|---|---|---|---|---|
| 261 | Chicago Cardinals | Newman Ledbetter | Tackle | Texas Tech |
| 262 | Boston Yanks | Don Gleasner | End | Maryland |
| 263 | Pittsburgh Steelers | Bob Hansen | End | UCLA |
| 264 | Chicago Bears | Howard Weldon | Guard | North Carolina |
| 265 | New York Giants | Charlie Ellis | Back | Virginia |
| 266 | Green Bay Packers | Joe Campbell | End | Holy Cross |
| 267 | Detroit Lions | Dick Van Duesen | Center | Minnesota |
| 268 | Philadelphia Eagles | Bob Long | Back | Tennessee |
| 269 | Washington Redskins | Jim Hallmark | Back | Texas A&M |
| 270 | Los Angeles Rams | Marty Grbovaz | End | San Francisco |

=== Round 29 ===
| Pick # | NFL team | Player | Position | College |
|---|---|---|---|---|
| 271 | Chicago Cardinals | Alton Baldwin | End | Arkansas |
| 272 | Boston Yanks | Carl McKinnon | Guard | Dartmouth |
| 273 | Pittsburgh Steelers | Larry Graves | Tackle | Newberry |
| 274 | Chicago Bears | Johnny Cook | Back | Georgia |
| 275 | New York Giants | Steve Lucas | End | Duke |
| 276 | Green Bay Packers | Francis Saunders | Tackle | Clemson |
| 277 | Philadelphia Eagles | Bill Fisher | Tackle | Harvard |
| 278 | Detroit Lions | Bill Agnew | Back | California |
| 279 | Washington Redskins | Fay Mills | Tackle | Alabama |
| 280 | Los Angeles Rams | Jay Perrin | Tackle | USC |

=== Round 30 ===
| Rnd. | Pick | Team | Player | Pos. | College | Notes |
|---|---|---|---|---|---|---|
| 30 | 281 | Chicago Cardinals | Jim LaRue | B | Duke | |
| 30 | 282 | Boston Yanks | Nick Klutka | E | Florida | |
| 30 | 283 | Pittsburgh Steelers | Gail Bruce | E | Washington | |
| 30 | 284 | Chicago Bears | Harry Franck | B | Northwestern | |
| 30 | 285 | New York Giants | Bill Voris | B | North Carolina | |
| 30 | 286 | Green Bay Packers | Al Sparlis | G | UCLA | |
| 30 | 287 | Detroit Lions | Tom Panos | G | Utah | |
| 30 | 288 | Philadelphia Eagles | George Slusser | B | Ohio State | |
| 30 | 289 | Washington Redskins | Tex Ritter | B | Georgia Tech | |
| 30 | 290 | Los Angeles Rams | Frank Plant | C | Georgia | |

=== Round 31 ===
| Rnd. | Pick | Team | Player | Pos. | College | Notes |
|---|---|---|---|---|---|---|
| 31 | 291 | Green Bay Packers | Ralph Clymer | G | Purdue | |
| 31 | 292 | Philadelphia Eagles | John Itzel | B | Pittsburgh | |
| 31 | 293 | Detroit Lions | Orlando Palesse | E | Marquette | |
| 31 | 294 | Washington Redskins | Sarkis Takesian | B | California | |
| 31 | 295 | Los Angeles Rams | Dale Cowan | T | Kansas State | |

=== Round 32 ===
| Rnd. | Pick | Team | Player | Pos. | College | Notes |
|---|---|---|---|---|---|---|
| 32 | 296 | Green Bay Packers | Joervin Henderson | C | Missouri | |
| 32 | 297 | Detroit Lions | Otis Schellstede | G | Oklahoma A&M | |
| 32 | 298 | Philadelphia Eagles | Larry Kirkman | B | Boston University | |
| 32 | 299 | Washington Redskins | Mike Campbell | E | Ole Miss | |
| 32 | 300 | Los Angeles Rams | John West | B | Oklahoma | |

== Hall of Famers ==
- George Connor, tackle from Notre Dame taken 1st round 5th overall by the New York Giants.

Inducted: Professional Football Hall of Fame class of 1975.

== Notable undrafted players ==
| ^{†} | = Pro Bowler | ‡ | = Hall of Famer |

| Original NFL team | Player | Pos. | College | Notes |
|---|---|---|---|---|
| Boston Yanks | John Badaczewski | G | Case Western Reserve | |
| Cleveland Browns | Frank Gatski^{‡} | C | Auburn | |
| Cleveland Browns | Lou Groza^{‡} | T/K | Ohio State | |
| Cleveland Browns | Marion Motley^{‡} | FB/LB | Nevada | |
| Cleveland Browns | Bill Willis^{‡} | DT | Ohio State | |
| Los Angeles Rams | Woody Strode | E | UCLA | |
| Los Angeles Rams | Kenny Washington | HB | UCLA | |
| Philadelphia Eagles | Otis Douglas | T | William & Mary | |
| Philadelphia Eagles | Cliff Patton | G | TCU | |
