= List of San Francisco Dons in the NFL draft =

This is a list of San Francisco Dons football players in the NFL draft.

== Key ==
B	Back	K	Kicker	NT	Nose tackle
C	Center	LB	Linebacker	FB	Fullback
DB	Defensive back	P	Punter	HB	Halfback
DE	Defensive end	QB	Quarterback	WR	Wide receiver
DT	Defensive tackle	RB	Running back	G	Guard
E	End	T	Offensive tackle	TE	Tight end

== Selections ==
Year	Round	Pick	Player	Team	Position
1936	1	7	Russ Letlow	Green Bay Packers	G
1938	9	80	Alex Schwartz	Detroit Lions	T
1939	11	96	Al Braga	Chicago Bears	B
1939	14	122	Blase Miatovich	Chicago Cardinals	T
1939	20	182	Tom Rice	Chicago Cardinals	T
1940	20	190	John Sullivan	New York Giants	E
1941	7	57	Bill Telesmanic	Green Bay Packers	E
1944	9	81	John Sanchez	New York Giants	T
1945	9	85	Forrest Hall	Philadelphia Eagles	B
1945	21	212	Eric Jamison	Boston Yanks	T
1945	23	234	Marty Grbovaz	Boston Yanks	E
1946	3	18	Harmon Rowe	Pittsburgh Steelers	B
1946	28	270	Marty Grbovaz	Los Angeles Rams	E
1947	5	27	Carroll Vogelaar	Boston Yanks	T
1948	2	12	Joe Scott	New York Giants	B
1948	29	266	Bobby Greenhalgh	New York Giants	B
1948	20	284	Al Pietkiewicz	Chicago Bears	E
1949	4	41	Don Panciera	Philadelphia Eagles	B
1949	10	94	George Buksar	Los Angeles Rams	B
1949	24	237	Fred Klemonek	Los Angeles Rams	B
1950	13	161	Jim Ryan	Detroit Lions	B
1951	2	19	Dick Stanfel	Detroit Lions	G
1951	9	105	Burl Toler	Cleveland Browns	G
1951	24	284	Art Alois	Pittsburgh Steelers	C
1952	1	3	Ollie Matson	Chicago Cardinals	B
1952	2	14	Gino Marchetti	New York Yanks	DE
1952	6	68	Ed Brown	Chicago Bears	B
1952	16	184	Mike Mergen	Chicago Cardinals	G
1952	23	267	Red Stephens	Chicago Cardinals	G
1953	3	32	Bob St. Clair	San Francisco 49ers	T
1955	30	354	K. C. Jones	Los Angeles Rams	E
1968	9	225	Mike Donohoe	Minnesota Vikings	TE
