= Stu Clarkson =

American football player (1919–1957)

- Clarkson with the Chicago Bears

No. 36, 31, 43
- Positions: Linebacker, center

Personal information
- Born: July 4, 1919; Corpus Christi, Texas, U.S.
- Died: October 25, 1957 (aged 38); Sugar Land, Texas, U.S.
- Listed height: 6 ft 2 in (1.88 m)
- Listed weight: 217 lb (98 kg)

Career information
- High school: Roy Miller (Corpus Christi)
- College: Texas A&I (1937–1940)
- NFL draft: 1942: 22nd round, 200th overall pick

Career history

Playing
- Chicago Bears (1942, 1946–1951); Winnipeg Blue Bombers (1952–1953)

Coaching
- Winnipeg Blue Bombers (1952–1953) Line coach

Awards and highlights
- NFL champion (1946); Texas A&M-Kingsville Football Hall of Fame; Texas A&M-Kingsville All Century Team

Career NFL statistics
- Games played: 75
- Starts: 18
- Interceptions: 10
- Fumble recoveries: 8
- Touchdowns: 1
- Stats at Pro Football Reference

Stuart Lenox Clarkson (July 4, 1919 – October 25, 1957) was a linebacker for the Chicago Bears from 1942 to 1951. He was the last pick in the 1942 NFL draft.

Clarkson was a two-time Little All-American at Texas A&I University (now Texas A&M-Kingsville), 1938 and 1939. He was posthumously named to the Texas A&M-Kingsville Football Hall of Fame, 1972, and was named to the Texas A&M-Kingsville Football Team of Century in 2000.

As a member of the 1946 World Champion Chicago Bears, he received an equal players share of $1,975.82. Following his tenure with the Chicago Bears, Clarkson was line coach and player for the Winnipeg Blue Bombers of the Canadian Football League (CFL) from 1952 to 1953. From 1943 to 1945, Clarkson served with the United States Army in England, France and Germany. On June 6, 1944, Clarkson was part of the American forces landing at Utah Beach, Normandy, France.

On October 25, 1957, while coaching during a game for the Sugar Land (Texas) High School football team, Clarkson suffered a heart attack and died on the side of the field. Sugar Land went on to beat Hitchcock High, 25–0. Clarkson had 2 sons.
