= Howard Maley =

American football player (1921–1987)

No. 16
- Positions: Quarterback, back, punter

Personal information
- Born: December 6, 1921; Dallas, Texas, U.S.
- Died: June 20, 1987 (aged 65); Dallas, Texas, U.S.
- Listed height: 5 ft 11 in (1.80 m)
- Listed weight: 187 lb (85 kg)

Career information
- High school: Woodrow Wilson (Dallas)
- College: Texas-Arlington; SMU (1940-1942, 1945)
- NFL draft: 1944: 17th round, 166th overall pick

Career history
- Boston Yanks (1946–1947)

Awards and highlights
- NFL punting yards leader (1947); Second-team All-SWC (1945)

Career NFL statistics
- Punts: 152
- Punting yards: 6,104
- Punting average: 40.2
- Stats at Pro Football Reference

Howard Edward "Red" Maley (December 6, 1921 – June 20, 1987), was an American professional football player who was a back and punter in the National Football League (NFL). Selected in the 1944 NFL draft, Maley played for two seasons from 1946 to 1947 for the Boston Yanks. Maley played college football for the Texas–Arlington Mavericks and SMU Mustangs.

== Early life ==
While growing up in Dallas, Maley played football during his time at Woodrow Wilson High School. His high school football coach, Wade Thompson, described Maley as "a quiet boy."

== College career ==
Maley played at the University of Texas at Arlington for the Mavericks before later playing at Southern Methodist University for the Mustangs in 1941 and 1942. During his time with the Mustangs, Maley was described by the Chicago Tribune as a "brilliant [...] triple threat." On being a triple threat, he was noted for his passing, running, and punting. As a sophomore, Maley sustained a "torn knee cartilage" during the 1941 season.

His college career was interrupted by World War II, during which he spent time in the Marine Corps. While he was serving in the Marine Corps, he was selected by the NFL's Brooklyn Dodgers, who would play as the Tigers during the season he was drafted. He later returned to SMU and during his senior year, he was the leading punter in college football. Wade Thompson stated, "I don't think SMU ever got all out of him that he had to give."

== NFL career ==
Maley was drafted 166th overall in the 17th round of the 1944 NFL draft by the Brooklyn Dodgers, who would play as the Brooklyn Tigers for the 1944 season. Due to financial issues, the Tigers would then merge with the Boston Yanks for the 1945 season.

The Yanks would utilize Maley in 1946 and 1947, primarily as a punter. Maley did, however, also register statistics in passing, rushing, receiving, punt returning, as well as kick returning. Maley threw for 2 touchdowns and 3 interceptions in his career. In 1947, Maley led the league in punting yards, with 3,731. At the time, it was the most punting yards recorded in a single NFL season, until Pat Brady surpassed the mark in 1953.

NFL.com lists Maley as a quarterback.

=== Career statistics ===
Led the league

Punting

Season	Team	GP	Punting					
Season	Team	GP	Punts	Yards	Y/P	Net	In20	TB
1946	Boston	11	60	2,373	39.6	N/A	61	1
1947	Boston	12	92	3,731	40.6	N/A	66	3
Career		23	152	6,104	40.2	N/A	66	4
