= 1946 Chicago Bears season =

NFL team season

- Owner: George Halas
- General manager: George Halas
- Head coach: George Halas
- Home stadium: Wrigley Field

Results
- Record: 8–2–1
- Division place: 1st NFL Western
- Playoffs: Won NFL Championship (at Giants) 24–14

The 1946 season was the Chicago Bears' 27th in the National Football League. The team improved on their 3–7 record from 1945 and finished with a 8–2–1 record, under head coach George Halas making his return from World War II en route to a Western Division title and an appearance in the NFL Championship Game. In the title game, the Bears defeated the New York Giants for their seventh league title and their fourth of the decade.

== Schedule ==
Game	Date	Opponent	Result	Record	Venue	Attendance	Recap	Sources
1	September 29	at **Green Bay Packers**	**W** 30–7	1–0	City Stadium	25,049	Recap	
2	October 6	at **Chicago Cardinals**	**W** 34–17	2–0	Comiskey Park	39,263	Recap	
3	October 13	**Los Angeles Rams**	**T** 28–28	2–0–1	Wrigley Field	44,211	Recap	
4	October 20	Philadelphia Eagles	**W** 21–14	3–0–1	Wrigley Field	41,221	Recap	
5	October 27	at New York Giants	**L** 0–14	3–1–1	Polo Grounds	62,349	Recap	
6	November 3	**Green Bay Packers**	**W** 10–7	4–1–1	Wrigley Field	46,321	Recap	
7	November 10	at **Los Angeles Rams**	**W** 27–21	5–1–1	LA Memorial Coliseum	68,381	Recap	
8	November 17	Washington Redskins	**W** 24–20	6–1–1	Wrigley Field	43,315	Recap	
9	November 24	**Detroit Lions**	**W** 42–6	7–1–1	Wrigley Field	31,169	Recap	
10	December 1	**Chicago Cardinals**	**L** 28–35	7–2–1	Wrigley Field	47,511	Recap	
11	December 8	at **Detroit Lions**	**W** 45–24	8–2–1	Briggs Stadium	19,579	Recap	
Note: Intra-division opponents are in **bold** text.

== Standings ==
Program for the October 13 game with the Los Angeles Rams.

Program for the October 20 game with the Philadelphia Eagles.

NFL Western Division
	W	L	T	PCT	DIV	PF	PA	STK
Chicago Bears	8	2	1	.800	6–1–1	289	193	W1
Los Angeles Rams	6	4	1	.600	5–2–1	277	257	W2
Chicago Cardinals	6	5	0	.545	5–3	260	198	W2
Green Bay Packers	6	5	0	.545	3–5	148	158	L1
Detroit Lions	1	10	0	.091	0–8	142	310	L4

Note: Tie games were not officially counted in the standings until 1972.

== Game summaries ==
=== Week 1 ===
Team	1	2	3	4	Total
• Bears	3	14	7	6	30
Packers	0	0	0	7	7

- Date: September 29
- Location: City Stadium, Green Bay, Wisconsin

Scoring summary
1	CHI	Frank Maznicki 27 yard field goal	Bears 3–0
2	CHI	Ken Kavanaugh 23 yard pass from Sid Luckman (Frank Maznicki kick)	Bears 10–0
2	CHI	Ray McLean 33 yard pass from Sid Luckman (Frank Maznicki kick)	Bears 17–0
3	CHI	Dick Schweidler 27 yard run (Joe Stydahar kick)	Bears 24–0
4	CHI	Bill Osmanski 20 yard run (kick failed)	Bears 30–0
4	GB	Roy McKay 9 yard run (Roy McKay kick)	Bears 30–7

== Playoffs ==
Round	Date	Opponent	Result	Record	Venue	Attendance	Recap	Sources
NFL Championship	December 15	at New York Giants	W 24–14	1–0	Polo Grounds	58,346	Recap	

== Roster ==
Chicago Bears 1946 final roster
Quarterbacks: 36 Tom Farris S; 42 Sid Luckman P/S; Ends/Receivers: 23 Connie Mack Berry; 51 Ken Kavanaugh; 20 Jim Keane; 12 Walt Lamb; 7 Ed Sprinkle; 30 George Wilson	Linemen/Linebackers: 26 Al Baisi G; 82 Ray Bray DG/G; 31 Stu Clarkson LB/C; 24 Fred Davis DT/T; 21 Chuck Drulis DG/G; 14 Aldo Forte G/DG; 25 Mike Jarmoluk DT/T; 29 Ed Kolman T/DT; 16 Rudy Mucha G/P; 53 Pat Preston G/DG; 41 John Schiechl C/LB; 45 Walt Stickel T/DT; 13 Joe Stydahar T/DT/K; 66 Bulldog Turner LB/C	Backs: 8 Hugh Gallarneau RB/CB; 33 Bob Margarita CB/RB; 3 Dante Magnani CB/RB; 4 Frank Maznicki RB/S/K; 5 George McAfee S/RB; 57 Ray McLean S/RB; 10 Noah Mullins CB/RB; 9 Bill Osmanski FB/LB; 18 Joe Osmanski FB/LB; 6 Don Perkins FB; 48 Dick Schweidler RB/CB; Rookies in italics
