= Dick Schweidler =

American gridiron football player (1914–2010)

No. 31, 7, 22, 88, 48, 61
- Position: Halfback

Personal information
- Born: August 18, 1914; Culver, Indiana, U.S.
- Died: March 18, 2010 (aged 95); La Jolla, California, U.S.
- Listed height: 6 ft 0 in (1.83 m)
- Listed weight: 182 lb (83 kg)

Career information
- High school: Lyons Township (La Grange, Illinois)
- College: None

Career history
- Chicago Gunners (1936); Chicago Bears (1938–1939); Newark Bears (1939–1940); San Diego Bombers (1941–1942, 1945); Chicago Bears (1946); Montreal Alouettes (1947)

Awards and highlights
- NFL champion (1946)
- Stats at Pro Football Reference

Richard Matthew Schweidler (August 18, 1914 – March 18, 2010) was an American professional football player who played three seasons with the Chicago Bears of the National Football League (NFL). He also played for the Montreal Alouettes of the Interprovincial Rugby Football Union.

== Early life ==
Richard Matthew Schweidler was born on August 18, 1914, in Culver, Indiana. He attended La Grange High School in La Grange, Illinois.

== Professional career ==
Schweidler played for the Chicago Gunners in 1936. He played for the NFL's Chicago Bears during the 1938 and 1939 seasons.

Schweidler played for the Newark Bears of the American Association from 1939 to 1940. He then played for the San Diego Bombers of the Pacific Coast Professional Football League from 1941 to 1942. Schweidler afterward served in the United States Army during World War II and played football for the Camp Cooke football team in California. He returned to the Bombers in 1945 after the war. He then played for the Chicago Bears again in 1946. Schweidler also appeared in the 1946 NFL Championship Game, a 24–14 victory over the New York Giants.

Schweidler finished his pro football career by dressing in six games for the Montreal Alouettes of the Interprovincial Rugby Football Union in 1947.

== Personal life ==
He died on March 18, 2010, in La Jolla, California.
