= Don Perkins (American football, born 1917) =

American football player (1917–1998)

No. 10, 23, 19, 48, 6
- Position: Back

Personal information
- Born: September 18, 1917; Dodgeville, Wisconsin, U.S.
- Died: September 15, 1998 (aged 80); Branson, Missouri, U.S.
- Listed height: 6 ft 0 in (1.83 m)
- Listed weight: 196 lb (89 kg)

Career information
- High school: Dodgeville
- College: Wisconsin–Platteville (1936-1939)
- NFL draft: 1943: undrafted

Career history
- Milwaukee Chiefs (1941); Green Bay Packers (1943–1945); Chicago Bears (1945–1946)

Awards and highlights
- 2× NFL champion (1944, 1946)

Career NFL statistics
- Rushing yards: 585
- Rushing average: 4.2
- Receptions: 5
- Receiving yards: 53
- Total touchdowns: 4
- Stats at Pro Football Reference

Donald E. Perkins (September 18, 1917 – September 15, 1998) was an American professional football player who spent four seasons with the Green Bay Packers and Chicago Bears.

Following his retirement from the NFL, Perkins settled in Waukegan, Illinois with his wife, Doris. The two raised five kids and later relocated southern Missouri after retirement, where Doris and some of their children still live.
