= Sonny Karnofsky =

American football player (1922–2015)

Profile
- Position: Halfback

Personal information
- Born: September 22, 1922; Oxnard, California, U.S.
- Died: January 9, 2015 (aged 92); Galt, California, U.S.
- Listed height: 5 ft 10 in (1.78 m)
- Listed weight: 175 lb (79 kg)

Career information
- High school: Phoenix Union (Phoenix, Arizona)
- College: Arizona

Career history
- Philadelphia Eagles (1945); Boston Yanks (1946)
- Stats at Pro Football Reference

Abraham "Sonny" Karnofsky (September 22, 1922 – January 9, 2015) was an American football halfback who played for the Philadelphia Eagles and Boston Yanks. He played college football at the University of Arizona, having previously attended Phoenix Union High School. He died of lung cancer at his home in Galt, California on January 9, 2015. He was Jewish.
