= Rubin Juster =

American football player (1923–1985)

No. 46
- Position: Tackle

Personal information
- Born: September 9, 1923; Minneapolis, Minnesota, U.S.
- Died: January 14, 1985 (aged 61); Chicago, Illinois, U.S.
- Listed height: 6 ft 2 in (1.88 m)
- Listed weight: 230 lb (104 kg)

Career information
- College: Minnesota

Career history
- Boston Yanks (1946)

Career NFL statistics
- Games played: 4
- Stats at Pro Football Reference

Rubin J. Juster (September 9, 1923 – January 14, 1985) was an American professional football player who appeared in four games for the Boston Yanks of the National Football League in 1946.
