= John Badaczewski =

American football player (1922-1999)

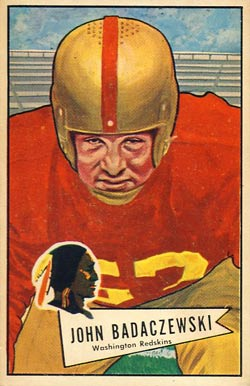
- Badaczewski on a 1952 Bowman football card

No. 35, 33, 82, 57, 68
- Position: Guard

Personal information
- Born: January 27, 1922; Johnstown, Pennsylvania, U.S.
- Died: December 12, 1999 (aged 77); Rockville, Maryland, U.S.
- Listed height: 6 ft 1 in (1.85 m)
- Listed weight: 239 lb (108 kg)

Career information
- College: Case Western Reserve (1940-1941)
- NFL draft: 1946: undrafted

Career history
- Boston Yanks (1946–1948); Chicago Cardinals (1948); Washington Redskins (1949–1951); Chicago Bears (1953)

Career NFL statistics
- Games played: 82
- Games started: 51
- Fumble recoveries: 1
- Stats at Pro Football Reference

John Walter "Baddie" Badaczewski (January 27, 1922 – December 12, 1999) was an American professional football player who was an offensive lineman in the National Football League (NFL) for the Boston Yanks, Chicago Cardinals, Washington Redskins, and Chicago Bears. He played college football for the Western Reserve Red Cats (now known as Case Western Reserve Spartans). He was inducted into the Cambria County Sports Hall of Fame.
