= Walt Stickel =

American football player (1922–1987)

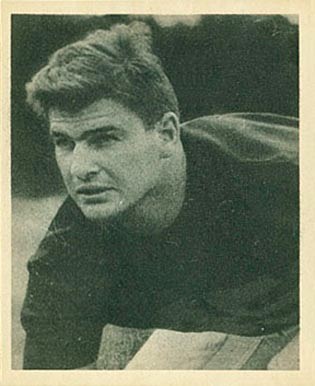
- Jankovich on a 1948 Bowman football card

No. 45, 75
- Positions: Tackle, defensive tackle

Personal information
- Born: March 31, 1922; Philadelphia, Pennsylvania, U.S.
- Died: December 6, 1987 (aged 65); Tequesta, Florida, U.S.
- Listed height: 6 ft 3 in (1.91 m)
- Listed weight: 247 lb (112 kg)

Career information
- High school: Northeast (Philadelphia)
- College: Tulsa; Pennsylvania (1943–1944)
- NFL draft: 1945: 21st round, 215th overall pick

Career history
- Chicago Bears (1946–1949); Philadelphia Eagles (1950–1951)

Awards and highlights
- NFL champion (1946)

Career NFL statistics
- Games played: 68
- Games started: 40
- Fumble recoveries: 4
- Stats at Pro Football Reference

Walt Stickel (March 31, 1922 – December 6, 1987) was an American professional football player who was an offensive lineman for six seasons for the Philadelphia Eagles and Chicago Bears.
