= 1946 Los Angeles Rams season =

NFL team season (first in LA)

- Head coach: Adam Walsh
- Home stadium: Los Angeles Memorial Coliseum

Results
- Record: 6–4–1
- Division place: 2nd NFL Western
- Playoffs: Did not qualify

The 1946 Los Angeles Rams season was the team's ninth year with the National Football League and the first season in Los Angeles. The team moved to Los Angeles from Cleveland immediately after winning the 1945 NFL Championship Game.

The 1946 team is best remembered for its inclusion of two African-American players, halfback Kenny Washington and end Woody Strode – the first in the NFL since the 1933 season. The team finished with a record of 6-4-1, good for second place in the NFL's Western Conference.

== Narrative ==
=== Relocation to Los Angeles ===
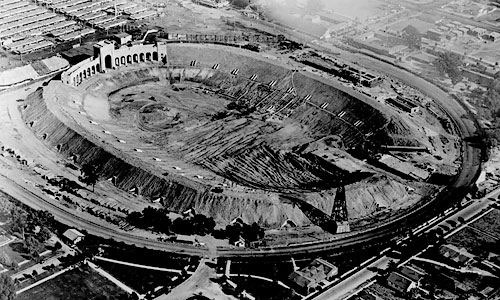
Los Angeles Memorial Coliseum, home of the Los Angeles Rams, was constructed at the expense of the city's taxpayers in 1922. It was also the venue used by the highly successful collegiate football programs of Los Angeles universities USC and UCLA.

The 1946 season marked the first time that the National Football League's Cleveland Rams played their games in the booming Southern California city of Los Angeles. Cleveland had won the 1945 NFL Championship Game by a 15-14 score over the Washington Redskins in December 1945 and immediately pursued plans to relocate to the greener pastures of the Pacific coast.

On January 15, 1946, Rams team representatives went before the Los Angeles Coliseum Commission with a plan to lease use of the facility for home games – the bowl then currently being used for home games played by UCLA and the University of Southern California. The Commission had previously been made aware that the Los Angeles Dons of the forthcoming All-America Football Conference would be seeking similar accommodation. On January 23, the Coliseum Commission approved use of the stadium for five Rams Sunday home games during the 1946 season. An additional exhibition game with the team's 1945 Championship opponents, the Redskins, was scheduled for the preseason.

With access to the 103,000 seat Los Angeles Memorial Coliseum assured, speculation immediately began about the team's drawing potential, with former collegiate coach Chick Meehan opining his belief that the Rams in their new Los Angeles venue would outdraw all other teams in the league with the exception of the New York Giants. A mere 32,178 fans had braved the elements to attend the 1945 Championship Game hosted by Cleveland.

=== Role in NFL integration ===
When the Cleveland Rams moved to Los Angeles, the team sought to play in the publicly owned Los Angeles Memorial Coliseum— a decision which created immediate pressure that the team be racially integrated, since black taxpayers as well as white had paid for construction of the facility. As a result, the team signed African-American free agent Kenny Washington, formerly of the Hollywood Bears of the Pacific Coast Professional Football League, on March 21, 1946.

Washington, winner of the 1939 Douglas Fairbanks Trophy as the outstanding player in college football, thus became the first African-American player of the modern era to sign a contract to play in the NFL. The last previous black player in the league had been Joe Lillard, formerly of the University of Oregon, who played for the Chicago Cardinals in 1932 and 1933.

The Rams also signed a second black player, fellow UCLA alumnus and Hollywood Bears teammate Woody Strode on May 7, 1946. The Rams were joined as trailblazers in the integration process by the ownership of the All-America Football Conference's Cleveland Browns, which also signed two black players for the 1946 season, Marion Motley and Bill Willis.

=== Roster development ===
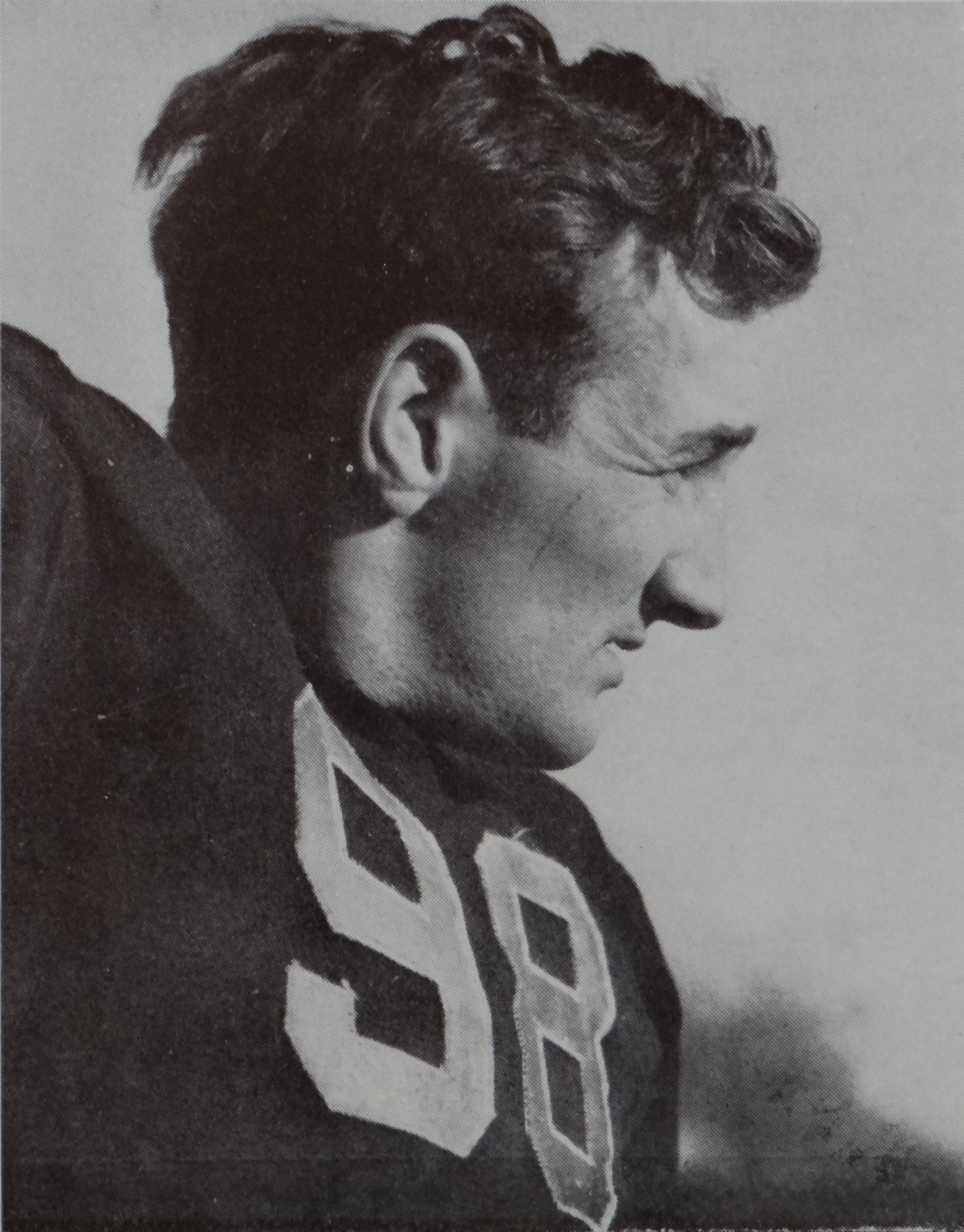
1940 Heisman winner and top pick of the 1941 NFL draft Tom Harmon was a high-profile player added to the Rams roster for the 1946 season by GM Chile Walsh.

The anchor of the team remained the quarterback who had captained the Rams to the 1945 World Championship as the league's Rookie of the Year, Bob Waterfield. A California native like Washington and Strod, the future Hall of Famer Waterfield would lead the NFL in attempts, completions, and passing TDs in 1946, going 127-for-251 (50.6%) with 17 touchdown strikes.

Waterfield's success throwing the ball was tempered by his propensity to throw interceptions, however, as he equalled his league-leading 17 interceptions thrown in 1945 in the 1946 campaign. Waterfield also handled punting and kicking duties for the team, kicking a league-leading 31 extra point in 1946 and averaging 40.6 yards per punt, with a season-long of 68 yards. In Waterfield the Rams' front office felt they had a field leader with a proven record of success.

In addition to a willingness to take a chance by toppling the NFL's 13-year ban on signing black athletes, Rams general manager Chile Walsh was aggressive in pursuing big name talent to flesh out the team's roster to make Rams games into compelling events. On July 20, 1946, Walsh executed a trade with the Chicago Bears, sending off halfback Dante Magnani and tackle Fred Davis to obtain the rights to two-time All-American and 1940 Heisman Trophy winner Tom Harmon, a 26-year-old who had served as a bomber pilot during World War II rather than playing ball for a service team. Already a Southern California resident with an actress for a wife, the league's number one overall pick of the 1941 NFL draft, seemed a natural fit for Los Angeles' newest sports entertainment company. For his own part, Bears boss George Halas was anxious to obtain Magnani, who had led the Bears in rushing in 1943.

Harmon would prove to be a bust for the team, however, only starting 3 games in the 1946 season and gaining a mere 236 yards – 84 of those on one play, in what would be the longest run from scrimmage in the NFL during the 1946 season. He would, however, also gain nearly 200 yards via the pass and score a total of 4 offensive touchdowns in what would be the best season of his two-year NFL career. Harmon proved more successful as a defender, picking off three balls, including one interception run back 85 yards for a touchdown in the 1946 season.

With team revenue tied largely to local ticket sales during this era of professional football, the Rams placed an emphasis upon accumulating West Coast players. Former Southern Californian collegiate stars Waterfield, Washington, Harmon, and Strode were joined on the roster by Pat West, Bob de Lauer, Jim Hardy, Bob Hoffman, and Jack Banta of USC; lineman Elbie Schultz of Oregon State; center Roger Harding of Cal; Charles Ferrero of UC Santa Barbara, and Glen Conley of the University of Washington.

=== NFL draft ===
Program for the Rams' September 6, 1946 exhibition game against the Washington Redskins, the first played by the team in the Los Angeles Coliseum.

As NFL champions the Rams drafted last out of the league's 10 teams in the 1946 NFL draft. They were also one of the five teams skipped in rounds 2 and 4 in an additional effort to build parity between poor and strong finishers – receiving instead low value compensatory picks in the 31st and 32nd rounds.

The Rams used 6 of their top 17 picks to select players from Notre Dame University, perhaps not coincidentally the alma mater of head coach Adam Walsh. Walsh had coached the team to its 1945 Championship in Cleveland in his first year at the helm, but the 1946 season in Los Angeles would be his last. In addition, the team appears to have placed an emphasis upon drafting collegians from the Western United States, picking 9 players from western schools.

1946 Los Angeles Rams Draft
Round	Selection	Player	Position	College
1	10	Emil "Red" Sitko	Halfback	Notre Dame
3	25	Don Samuel	Back	Oregon State University
5	40	Don Paul	Center	UCLA
6	50	Newell "Ace" Oestreich	Back	University of California
7	60	Lafayette "Dolly" King	End	University of Georgia
8	70	Joe Whisler	Back	Ohio State University
9	80	Mike Schumchyk	End	University of Arkansas
10	90	Joe Signaigo	Guard	Notre Dame
11	100	Tom Phillips	Back	Ohio State University
12	110	Ted Strojny	Tackle	Holy Cross University
13	120	George Strohmeyer	Center	Notre Dame
14	130	Bob Palladino	Back	Notre Dame
15	140	Dick Lorenz	End	Oregon State University
16	150	Larry Bouley	Back	University of Georgia
17	160	Gasper Urban	Guard	Notre Dame
18	170	Bob Wise	Guard	University of Colorado
19	180	Jerry Ford	End	Notre Dame
20	190	Bob Albrecht	Back	Marquette University
21	200	Cliff Lewis	Quarterback	Duke
22	210	Bob Richardson	Tackle	Marquette University
23	220	Derald Lebow	Back	University of Oklahoma
24	230	Bill Lippincott	Back	Washington State University
25	240	Kay Jamison	End	University of Florida
26	250	D.J. Gambrell	Center	University of Alabama
27	260	Joe Ben Dickey	Back	University of Colorado
28	270	Marty Grbovaz	End	University of San Francisco
29	280	Jay Perrin	Tackle	University of Southern California
30	290	Frank Plant	Center	University of Georgia
31	295	Dale Cowan	Tackle	Kansas State University
32	300	John West	Back	University of Oklahoma

== Regular season ==
=== Schedule ===
Game	Date	Opponent	Result	Record	Venue	Attendance	Recap	Sources
1	September 29	Philadelphia Eagles	**L** 14–25	0–1	LA Memorial Coliseum	30,500	Recap	
2	October 6	at **Green Bay Packers**	**W** 21–17	1–1	Wisconsin State Fair Park	27,049	Recap	
3	October 13	at **Chicago Bears**	**T** 28–28	1–1–1	Wrigley Field	44,211	Recap	
4	October 20	**Detroit Lions**	**W** 35–14	2–1–1	LA Memorial Coliseum	27,928	Recap	
5	October 27	at **Chicago Cardinals**	**L** 10–34	2–2–1	Comiskey Park	38,180	Recap	
6	November 3	at **Detroit Lions**	**W** 41–20	3–2–1	Briggs Stadium	34,447	Recap	
7	November 10	**Chicago Bears**	**L** 21–27	3–3–1	LA Memorial Coliseum	68,831	Recap	
8	November 17	**Chicago Cardinals**	**W** 17–14	4–3–1	LA Memorial Coliseum	38,271	Recap	
9	November 24	at Boston Yanks	**L** 21–40	4–4–1	Fenway Park	23,689	Recap	
10	December 1	at New York Giants	**W** 31–21	5–4–1	Polo Grounds	47,366	Recap	
11	December 8	**Green Bay Packers**	**W** 38–17	6–4–1	LA Memorial Coliseum	46,838	Recap	
Note: Intra-division opponents are in **bold** text.

== Roster ==
1946 Los Angeles Rams roster
Backs: 33 Jack Banta RB/CB; 34 Tom Farmer RB; 18 Fred Gehrke CB/RB; 21 Jim Hardy QB/S/P; 98 Tom Harmon S/RB; 16 Bob Hoffman LB/FB; 45 Mike Holovak FB/LB; 20 Ralph Ruthstrom RB/CB; 46 Steve Sucic RB; 13 Kenny Washington FB/LB; 7 Bob Waterfield QB/CB/K/P; 36 Pat West FB/LB; 50 Jack Wilson RB/CB; Ends/Receivers: 49 Jim Benton; 44 Ray Hamilton; 53 Red Hickey; 30 Steve Pritko; 60 Bob Shaw; 39 Woody Strode	Linemen/Linebackers: 66 Gil Bouley T/DT; 15 Roger Harding C/LB; 55 Bob deLauer C; 43 Roger Eason DG/G; 42 Jake Fawcett T/G/DT/DG; 8 Clyde Johnson T/DT; 27 Milan Lazetich G/DG; 41 Les Lear G/DG; 76 Butch Levy DG/G; 11 Riley Matheson LB/G/C; 31 Art Mergenthal G; 22 Fred Naumetz C/LB; 65 Joe Pasqua T/DT; 40 Elbie Schultz T/DT; rookies in italics

== Standings ==
Program for the November 17 game against the Chicago Cards.

NFL Western Division
	W	L	T	PCT	DIV	PF	PA	STK
Chicago Bears	8	2	1	.800	6–1–1	289	193	W1
Los Angeles Rams	6	4	1	.600	5–2–1	277	257	W2
Chicago Cardinals	6	5	0	.545	5–3	260	198	W2
Green Bay Packers	6	5	0	.545	3–5	148	158	L1
Detroit Lions	1	10	0	.091	0–8	142	310	L4

Note: Tie games were not officially counted in the standings until 1972.

== See also ==
- 1946 NFL Championship Game
