= Bob Long (halfback) =

American football player (1922–1961)

No. 11
- Position: Halfback

Personal information
- Born: April 9, 1922; Trenton, Tennessee, U.S.
- Died: August 2, 1961 (aged 39); Humboldt, Tennessee, U.S.
- Listed height: 5 ft 10 in (1.78 m)
- Listed weight: 190 lb (86 kg)

Career information
- High school: Peabody (TN)
- College: Tennessee
- NFL draft: 1946: 28th round, 268th overall pick

Career history
- Boston Yanks (1947)

Career NFL statistics
- Games played: 2
- Stats at Pro Football Reference

Robert Albert Long (April 9, 1922 – August 2, 1961) was an American professional football halfback who spent one season in the National Football League (NFL) with the Boston Yanks in 1947. He was drafted by the Philadelphia Eagles in the 28th round of the 1946 NFL Draft with the 268th overall pick. Long died on August 2, 1961, at the age of 39.
