= Bill Dutton (American football) =

American football player (1918–1951)

No. 16
- Position: Halfback

Personal information
- Born: December 9, 1918; Weston, West Virginia, U.S.
- Died: August 2, 1951; Pittsburgh, Pennsylvania, U.S.
- Listed height: 5 ft 10 in (1.78 m)
- Listed weight: 180 lb (82 kg)

Career information
- College: Pittsburgh (1939–1942)
- NFL draft: 1943: 3rd round, 25th overall pick

Career history
- Pittsburgh Steelers (1946); New York Yankees (1947)

Awards and highlights
- First-team All-Eastern (1942)

Career NFL statistics
- Rushing yards: 169
- Rushing average: 3.2
- Receptions: 2
- Receiving yards: 68
- Total touchdowns: 2
- Stats at Pro Football Reference

William Earl Dutton (December 9, 1918 – August 2, 1951) was an American professional football halfback in the National Football League (NFL) for the Pittsburgh Steelers. He played college football at the University of Pittsburgh and was drafted in the third round of the 1943 NFL draft by the Washington Redskins.

== Early life ==
William E. Dutton was born in Weston, West Virginia. He played for the University of Pittsburgh. As a freshman in 1938, he played under coach Jock Sutherland. He dropped out of school in 1939 and then returned to play in Pittsburgh under coach Charley Bowser from 1940 to 1942. He played as halfback and in 1942, he reached 1,375 offensive yards. He went by the nickname "Wild Bill".

== Career ==
Dutton was drafted in the third round by the Washington Redskins in 1943. He went into the service before he was able to play a down with them. During World War II, Dutton served in the United States Navy as a chief petty officer for 30 months and was a member of the undefeated United States Naval Training Center Bainbridge football team. After being discharged from the Navy, he played for the Chicago Cardinals. He was then traded to the Pittsburgh Steelers and played in the 1946 season. He was released by the Steelers on September 22, 1947. He also played for the New York Yankees in 1947. He was released by the Yankees on November 8, 1947.

In 1951, Dutton worked for the Pennsylvania government as a lab technician on the Penn-Lincoln Highway project.

== Personal life ==
Dutton married Mary. They had two children, Mary Margaret and Barbara. He lived at 1108 Cochran Road in Mt. Lebanon, Pennsylvania.

Dutton died on August 2, 1951, at South Side Hospital in Pittsburgh. He sustained injuries earlier in the morning when he was an automobile accident on Banksville Road that threw him from his convertible.
