= Joe Byler =

American football player (1922–1994)

No. 70
- Position: Tackle

Personal information
- Born: August 25, 1922; Republican City, Nebraska, U.S.
- Died: May 5, 1994 (aged 71); Des Moines, Iowa, U.S.
- Listed height: 6 ft 5 in (1.96 m)
- Listed weight: 240 lb (109 kg)

Career information
- High school: Alma (NE)
- College: Nebraska

Career history
- New York Giants (1946)
- Stats at Pro Football Reference

Joe Byler (August 25, 1922 – May 5, 1994) was an American professional football tackle. He played for the New York Giants in 1946.
