= Jim Plyler =

American football player (born 1924)

Profile
- Positions: Tackle, punter

Personal information
- Born: August 21, 1924; Corsicana, Texas, U.S.
- Died: June 9, 2016 (aged 91); Tyler, Texas, U.S.
- Listed weight: 240 lb (109 kg)

Career information
- High school: Corsicana
- College: The University of Texas, Lamar University

Awards and highlights
- All-Texas Junior College Conference Team - (1942); Cotton Bowl champion - (1943, 1945); Southwest Conference champion - (1943, 1945)

Jimmy Frank Plyler (August 21, 1924 – June 9, 2016) was an American football player and educator. He was a tackle and punter at the University of Texas from 1943 to 1945 and was selected by the New York Giants in the seventh round (55th overall) of the 1946 NFL draft. He had a long career as a teacher and coach that culminated with a decade as Superintendent of Schools in the Tyler Independent School District from 1969 to 1979.

== Early life ==
Plyler attended Corsicana High School, where he earned four letters in football, three in basketball, and made the all-district football team in 1941.

== College career ==
Plyler started his college career at Lamar Junior College on an athletic scholarship, where he was selected for the All-Texas Junior College Conference Team in 1942.

After knee problems prevented him from serving in the armed services and a brief time at the University of Tulsa, he transferred to the University of Texas at Austin, again on an athletic scholarship. He earned three letters in football and one reserve letter in baseball. He played on two teams that won the Southwest Conference Championship, one that went on to tie in the 1944 Cotton Bowl Classic and won, which he captained, that won the 1946 Cotton Bowl Classic - though he missed most of the game with the flu.

== Professional career ==
Plyler was selected by the New York Giants in the seventh round, with the 55th overall pick, of the 1946 NFL draft. He didn't play for the Giants, but the next season he was signed by the Brooklyn Dodgers football team in the AAFC. He went to their summer camp in Snow Valley, Idaho but was released without playing for the team.

== Later life ==
He earned his B.S. at U.T. Austin, his M.A. at Stephen F. Austin, and completed post-graduate work at Texas Eastern and Columbia University. He began teaching and coaching at Schreiner Institute in Kerrville, moved to Lufkin High School, and settled in at Tyler High School in 1951 as a teacher and coach. He was named Assistant Principal at Robert E Lee High School in 1958, Principal at Moore Junior High in 1961, and Director of Personnel in 1964.

He served as Superintendent of Schools in Tyler ISD from 1969-1979, overseeing the integration of the Tyler schools.

In 1981, he was elected Chief Appraiser for Smith County Appraisal District. He also worked for Tyler Bank and Trust and the Ramey Law Firm.

The Jim Plyler Instructional Complex was named in honor of his contributions to Tyler ISD.
