= Jack Breslin =

American academic administrator (1920–1988)

- Born: June 23, 1920; Battle Creek, Michigan, U.S.
- Died: August 2, 1988 (aged 68); Lansing, Michigan, U.S.
- Occupations: Student leader, administrator

Jacweir "Jack" Breslin (June 23, 1920 – August 2, 1988) was an American university administrator at Michigan State University (MSU).

Breslin was born and raised in Battle Creek, Michigan. He first came to MSU, when it was still known as Michigan State College, as a student athlete, playing basketball, football and baseball before graduating in 1946.

Breslin, a back, was drafted by the Boston Yanks in the fourth round of the 1946 NFL draft (#27 overall) but never played.

He worked for four years as a district manager for Dodge Motor Company in Allentown, Pennsylvania. In 1950, he returned to MSU as assistant director of alumni relations. In 1953 he became director of MSU's placement bureau and in 1958 he became assistant to the vice president of MSU.

Breslin served as the executive vice president of MSU. Breslin's leadership, played a role in the growth and development of the university. During Breslin's career, from the early 1950s to the late 1970s, MSU transformed from a small state university focused on agriculture to an internationally respected research university. The student population grew from about 6,000 to about 40,000.

In 1969, Breslin was one of the first administrators to initiate planning for a multi-purpose, student building; and continued to be the leading force through its conceptual design. Prints of such a design were completed in January 1970 and featured such innovations as an extra “practice gymnasium,” and a dedicated space for male and female performers. When Breslin died, the building was named the Breslin Student Events Center in his honor.

Breslin died on August 2, 1988, in Lansing, Michigan.
