= Steve Sucic =

American football player and coach (1921–2001)

Biographical details
- Born: April 21, 1921; Chicago, Illinois, U.S.
- Died: June 29, 2001 (aged 80); University Park, Illinois, U.S.

Playing career
- 1940–1942: Illinois
- 1946: Los Angeles Rams
- 1947: Boston Yanks
- 1947–1948: Detroit Lions
- Position: Halfback

Coaching career (HC unless noted)
- 1951–1952: Illinois (freshmen)
- 1953–1954: Bradley
- 1955–1957: Kansas State (assistant)
- 1966: Richmond Rebels

Stephen Sucic (April 21, 1921 – June 29, 2001) was an American football player and coach.
