= Don Gleasner =

American football player (1922–2011)

Profile
- Positions: Guard, End

Personal information
- Born: December 30, 1922
- Died: May 3, 2011 (aged 88)
- Listed height: 6 ft 3 in (1.91 m)
- Listed weight: 198 lb (90 kg)

Career information
- High school: Wilmington (Delaware)
- College: Maryland
- University: East Hampton, New York
- NFL draft: 1946: 28th round, 262nd overall pick

Donald Gleasner (December 30, 1922 - May 3, 2011) was an American football player. He played as an end and guard at the University of Maryland. In 1945, his senior year, Maryland was coached by the legendary Bear Bryant. Their penultimate game of the season was in Washington, D.C. against then 13th-ranked and undefeated Virginia (7–0). In the game's final seconds, Gleasner caught a 50–yard pass from tailback Bill Poling for the game-winning touchdown. At Maryland, Gleasner was also member of the Alpha Sigma chapter of the Delta Sigma Phi fraternity where he served as the vice-president. Gleasner was selected in the 28th round of the 1946 NFL draft (262nd overall) by the Boston Yanks.

Gleasner died in East Hampton, New York in 2011.
