= 1946 New York Giants season =

NFL team 22nd season

- Head coach: Steve Owen
- Home stadium: Polo Grounds

Results
- Record: 7–3–1
- Division place: 1st NFL Eastern
- Playoffs: Lost NFL Championship (vs. Bears) 14–24

The 1946 New York Giants season was the franchise's 22nd season in the National Football League. The Giants finished first in the NFL Eastern Division and hosted the championship game. At the Polo Grounds a record 58,346 fans were attendance. Despite home field advantage, the team would come up short vs the Chicago Bears 24–14.

== Schedule ==
Week	Date	Opponent	Result	Record	Venue
1	Bye				
2	October 1	at **Boston Yanks**	**W** 17–0	1–0	Braves Field
3	October 6	at **Pittsburgh Steelers**	**W** 17–14	2–0	Forbes Field
4	October 13	at **Washington Redskins**	**L** 14–24	2–1	Griffith Stadium
5	October 20	Chicago Cardinals	**W** 28–24	3–1	Polo Grounds
6	October 27	Chicago Bears	**W** 14–0	4–1	Polo Grounds
7	November 3	at **Philadelphia Eagles**	**L** 14–24	4–2	Shibe Park
8	November 10	**Philadelphia Eagles**	**W** 45–17	5–2	Polo Grounds
9	November 17	**Boston Yanks**	**T** 28–28	5–2–1	Polo Grounds
10	November 24	**Pittsburgh Steelers**	**W** 7–0	6–2–1	Polo Grounds
11	December 1	Los Angeles Rams	**L** 21–31	6–3–1	Polo Grounds
12	December 8	**Washington Redskins**	**W** 31–0	7–3–1	Polo Grounds
Note: Intra-division opponents are in **bold** text.

== Playoffs ==
Round	Date	Opponent	Result	Venue	Recap
Championship	December 15	Chicago Bears	**L** 14–24	Polo Grounds	Recap

== Standings ==
NFL Eastern Division
	W	L	T	PCT	DIV	PF	PA	STK
New York Giants	7	3	1	.700	5–2–1	236	162	W1
Philadelphia Eagles	6	5	0	.545	5–3	231	220	W2
Pittsburgh Steelers	5	5	1	.500	4–3–1	136	117	L2
Washington Redskins	5	5	1	.500	4–3–1	171	191	L2
Boston Yanks	2	8	1	.200	0–7–1	189	273	L1

Note: Tie games were not officially counted in the standings until 1972.

== Roster ==
1946 New York Giants final roster
**Backs**: 12 Dave Brown RB/CB; 40 Frank Filchock RB/CB; 23 Steve Filipowicz LB/RB; 37 George Franck RB/CB/P; 25 Pete Gorgone FB; 30 Merle Hapes FB/LB/P; 22 Cecil Hare CB/FB; 10 Howie Livingston CB/RB; 41 Emery Nix RB/CB; 38 Bill Paschal FB/LB; 44 Frank Reagan RB/S/P; 15 Hank Soar S	**Linemen/Linebackers**: 70 Joe Byler T/DT; 90 Vic Carroll DT/DG/G; 1 Frank Cope T/DT; 79 Tex Coulter DT/T; 55 Lou DeFilippo LB/C; 67 Bob Dobelstein G/DG; 66 Monk Edwards DG/G; 51 Chet Gladchuk C/LB; 65 Kayo Lunday G/DG; 57 Lou Palazzi LB/C; 71 Phil Ragazzo T/DT; 61 Orville Tuttle G/DG; 77 Jim White DT/T; 60 Len Younce DG/G	**Ends/Receivers**: 81 Jim Lee Howell; 88 Frank Liebel CB; 85 Jack Mead; 87 Don McCafferty; 80 Buster Poole; 83 Johnny Weiss; **Special teams**: 50 Ken Strong K; rookies in italics

== See also ==
- List of New York Giants seasons
