= 1946 Pittsburgh Steelers season =

NFL team season

- Head coach: Jock Sutherland
- Home stadium: Forbes Field

Results
- Record: 5–5–1
- Division place: 3rd (tied) NFL Eastern
- Playoffs: Did not qualify

The 1946 Pittsburgh Steelers season was the franchise's 14th season in the National Football League (NFL). The team finished the season with a record of 5–5–1. This season marked the first of two seasons played with Jock Sutherland as head coach.

== Off Season Changes ==
When the 1945 season ended, Jock Sutherland returned from service in World War II and signed a head coaching contract with team owner Art Rooney, Sr. on December 29, 1945 in front of local reporters. Sutherland's fame as a college coach caused a great deal of excitement among Steelers fans and ticket sales for the 1946 season set records.

Additionally, fan favorite Bill Dudley was set to return for his first full season since serving in World War II. Dudley had only played in 4 games in 1945. By the end of the season, Dudley's play was so exceptional, he was named the NFL's Most Valuable Player.

== Regular season ==
=== Schedule ===
Week	Date	Opponent	Result	Record	Venue	Attendance	Sources
1	September 20	Chicago Cardinals	**W** 14–7	1–0	Forbes Field	32,951	Recap
2	September 29	at Washington Redskins	**T** 14–14	1–0–1	Griffith Stadium	33,620	Recap
3	October 6	New York Giants	**L** 14–17	1–1–1	Forbes Field	33,702	Recap
4	October 13	Boston Yanks	**W** 16–7	2–1–1	Forbes Field	34,297	Recap
5	October 20	at Green Bay Packers	**L** 7–17	2–2–1	City Stadium	22,588	Recap
6	October 27	at Boston Yanks	**W** 33–7	3–2–1	Fenway Park	13,797	Recap
7	November 3	Washington Redskins	**W** 14–7	4–2–1	Forbes Field	36,995	Recap
8	November 10	at Detroit Lions	**L** 7–17	4–3–1	Briggs Stadium	13,621	Recap
9	November 17	Philadelphia Eagles	**W** 10–7	5–3–1	Forbes Field	38,882	Recap
10	November 24	at New York Giants	**L** 0–7	5–4–1	Polo Grounds	45,347	Recap
11	December 1	at Philadelphia Eagles	**L** 7–10	5–5–1	Shibe Park	29,943	Recap
Note: Intra-division opponents are in **bold** text.

=== Game summaries ===
==== Game 1 (Friday September 20, 1946): Chicago Cardinals ====
	1	2	3	4	Total
Cardinals	0	0	7	0	**7**
**Steelers**	7	7	0	0	**14**

at Forbes Field, Pittsburgh, Pennsylvania

- Game time:
- Game weather:
- Game attendance: 32,951
- Referee:

Scoring Drives:

- Pittsburgh – Seabright 8 pass from Dudley (Dudley kick)
- Pittsburgh – Compagno 1 run (Dudley kick)
- Chicago Cardinals – Goldberg 8 pass from Mallouf (Cuff kick)

==== Game 2 (Monday September 29, 1946): Washington Redskins ====
	1	2	3	4	Total
Steelers	0	0	0	14	**14**
Redskins	7	7	0	0	**14**

at Griffith Stadium, Washington, DC

- Game time:
- Game weather:
- Game attendance: 33,620
- Referee:

Scoring Drives:

- Washington – Saenz 1 run (Poillon kick)
- Washington – Todd 23 pass from Baugh (Poillon kick)
- Pittsburgh – Jansante 17 pass from Clement (Dudley kick)
- Pittsburgh – Dudley 1 run (Dudley kick)

==== Game 3 (Sunday October 6, 1946): New York Giants ====
	1	2	3	4	Total
**Giants**	0	17	0	0	**17**
Steelers	0	0	7	7	**14**

at Forbes Field, Pittsburgh, Pennsylvania

- Game time:
- Game weather:
- Game attendance: 33,702
- Referee:

Scoring Drives:

- New York – Hapes 2 run (Strong kick)
- New York – Filchock 70 run (Strong kick)
- New York – FG Strong 23
- Pittsburgh – Garnaas 30 pass from Dudley (Dudley kick)
- Pittsburgh – Clement 2 run (Dudley kick)

==== Game 4 (Sunday October 13, 1946): Boston Yanks ====
	1	2	3	4	Total
Yanks	0	0	0	7	**7**
**Steelers**	0	16	0	0	**16**

at Forbes Field, Pittsburgh, Pennsylvania

- Game time:
- Game weather:
- Game attendance: 34,297
- Referee:

Scoring Drives:

- Pittsburgh – Lach 1 run (kick blocked)
- Pittsburgh – Lach 5 run (Dudley kick)
- Pittsburgh – FG Dudley 34
- Boston – Scollard 6 fumble run (Scollard kick)

==== Game 5 (Sunday October 20, 1946): Green Bay Packers ====
	1	2	3	4	Total
Steelers	0	7	0	0	**7**
**Packers**	0	3	0	14	**17**

at East Stadium, Green Bay, Wisconsin

- Game time:
- Game weather:
- Game attendance: 22,588
- Referee:

Scoring Drives:

- Green Bay – FG Fritsch 38
- Pittsburgh – Dudley 31 run (Dudley kick)
- Green Bay – Luhn, 19 pass from Comp (Fritsch kick)
- Green Bay – Schlinkman 2 run (Fritsch kick)

==== Game 6 (Sunday October 27, 1946): Boston Yanks ====
	1	2	3	4	Total
**Steelers**	6	0	14	13	**33**
Yanks	0	7	0	0	**7**

at Fenway Park, Boston, Massachusetts

- Game time:
- Game weather:
- Game attendance: 13,797
- Referee:

Scoring Drives:

- Pittsburgh – Condit 18 run (kick failed)
- Boston – Dimancheff 26 pass from Governali (Scollard kick)
- Pittsburgh – Dudley 23 lateral from Compagno (Dudley kick)
- Pittsburgh – R. Davis 29 fumble run (Dudley kick)
- Pittsburgh – Dudley – 80 pass from Condit (Condit kick)
- Pittsburgh – Dutton 38 run (kick failed)

==== Game 7 (Sunday November 3, 1946): Washington Redskins ====
	1	2	3	4	Total
Redskins	0	0	0	7	**7**
**Steelers**	7	0	0	7	**14**

at Forbes Field, Pittsburgh, Pennsylvania

- Game time:
- Game weather:
- Game attendance: 36,995
- Referee:

Scoring Drives:

- Pittsburgh – Dudley 80 interception (Dudley kick)
- PIttsburgh – Lach 5 run (Dudley kick)
- Washington – Baugh 1 run (Poillon kick)

==== Game 8 (Sunday November 10, 1946): Detroit Lions ====
	1	2	3	4	Total
Steelers	0	0	0	7	**7**
**Lions**	0	10	0	7	**17**

at Briggs Stadium, Detroit, Michigan

- Game time:
- Game weather:
- Game attendance: 13,621
- Referee:

Scoring Drives:

- Detroit – FG Helms 35
- Detroit – DeCorrevont 72 pass from Ryan (DeShane kick)
- Pittsburgh – Dutton 12 run (Dudley kick)
- Detroit – Greene 88 pass from Ryan (DeShane kick)

==== Game 9 (Sunday November 17, 1946): Philadelphia Eagles ====
	1	2	3	4	Total
Eagles	7	7	0	14	**28**
Steelers	7	14	7	0	**28**

at Forbes Field, Pittsburgh, Pennsylvania

- Game time:
- Game weather:
- Game attendance: 38,882
- Referee:

Scoring Drives:

- Philadelphia – Zimmerman 1 run (Zimmerman kick)
- Pittsburgh – Lach 1 run (Condit kick)
- Pittsburgh – FG Dudley 14

==== Game 10 (Sunday November 24, 1946): New York Giants ====
	1	2	3	4	Total
Steelers	0	0	0	0	**0**
**Giants**	0	7	0	0	**7**

at Polo Grounds, New York, New York

Scoring Drives:

- Game time:
- Game weather:
- Game attendance: 45,346
- Referee:

Scoring Drives:

- New York – Paschal 4 run (Strong kick)

==== Game 11 (Sunday December 1, 1946): Philadelphia Eagles ====
	1	2	3	4	Total
Steelers	0	0	7	0	**7**
**Eagles**	7	3	0	0	**10**

at Shibe Park, Philadelphia, Pennsylvania

- Game time:
- Game weather:
- Game attendance: 29,943
- Referee:

Scoring Drives:

- Philadelphia – Pritchard 58 run (Lio kick)
- Philadelphia – FG Lio 15
- Pittsburgh – Lach 7 run (Dudley kick)

== Roster ==
1946 Pittsburgh Steelers final roster
Backs: 0 Johnny Clement RB/P; 44 Tony Compagno LB/FB; 42 Merl Condit CB/RB/K; 35 Bill Dudley RB/CB/P/K; 16 Bill Dutton RB/CB; 30 Bill Garnaas RB; 20 Walt Gorinski FB/S; 73 Max Kielbasa RB; 37 Steve Lach FB/LB; 27 John Patrick FB/S; 25 Jim Reynolds RB/CB; 33 Charley Seabright S/FB; 17 Andy Tomasic RB/CB; Ends/Receivers: 85 Tony Bova; 28 Bob Davis; 23 Sam Gray; 54 Val Jansante; 55 Charley Mehelich	Linemen/Linebackers: 45 Art Brandau C/LB; 64 Ray Bucek G/LB; 21 Chuck Cherundolo C/LB; 50 Joe Coomer T/DT; 26 Ralph Fife MG/G; 40 Earl Klapstein T/DT; 92 Frank Mattioli G/MG; 48 Art McCaffray T/DT; 36 Elmer Merkovsky T/DT; 22 John Perko G/MG; 38 Joe Repko T/DT; 12 Nick Skorich G/MG; 43 George Titus C/LB; 75 Jack Wiley DT/T; Rookies in italics

== Standings ==
NFL Eastern Division
	W	L	T	PCT	DIV	PF	PA	STK
New York Giants	7	3	1	.700	5–2–1	236	162	W1
Philadelphia Eagles	6	5	0	.545	5–3	231	220	W2
Pittsburgh Steelers	5	5	1	.500	4–3–1	136	117	L2
Washington Redskins	5	5	1	.500	4–3–1	171	191	L2
Boston Yanks	2	8	1	.200	0–7–1	189	273	L1

Note: Tie games were not officially counted in the standings until 1972.
