= 1946 Washington Redskins season =

NFL team season

- Owner: George Preston Marshall
- General manager: Sid Carroll
- Head coach: Turk Edwards
- Home stadium: Griffith Stadium

Results
- Record: 5–5–1
- Division place: 3rd (tied) NFL Eastern
- Playoffs: Did not qualify

The 1946 Washington Redskins season was the franchise's 15th season in the National Football League (NFL) and their 9th in Washington, D.C. The team failed to improve on their 8–2 record from 1945 and finished 5–5–1.

Although the NFL formally desegregated in 1946, many teams were slow to allow black athletes to compete even after the formal barrier had fallen. None were less willing to desegregate than the Washington Redskins, who sought to be the "home team" for a vast Southern market. The Redskins would remain the last bastion of racial segregation in the NFL, refusing to include a single black player on their roster until 1962.

== Preseason ==
Week	Date	Opponent	Result	Record	Venue	Attendance
1	August 30	at San Diego Bomber All-Stars (PCPFL)	W 34–6	1–0	Balboa Stadium	11,000
2	September 6	at Los Angeles Rams	L 14–16	1–1	Los Angeles Memorial Coliseum	68,188
3	September 10	vs. Green Bay Packers	W 35–31	2–1	University of Denver Stadium (Denver, CO)	21,000
4	September 15	at Norfolk Shamrocks (Dixie)	W 56–0	3–1	Foreman Field	13,500
5	September 22	vs. Chicago Bears	L 14–20	3–2	Municipal Stadium (Baltimore, MD)	51,580

== Regular season ==
=== Schedule ===
Game	Date	Opponent	Result	Record	Venue	Attendance	Recap	Sources
1	September 29	**Pittsburgh Steelers**	**T** 14–14	0–0–1	Griffith Stadium	33,620	Recap	
2	October 6	Detroit Lions	**W** 17–16	1–0–1	Griffith Stadium	33,569	Recap	
3	October 13	**New York Giants**	**W** 24–14	2–0–1	Griffith Stadium	33,651	Recap	
4	October 20	at **Boston Yanks**	**W** 14–6	3–0–1	Fenway Park	24,357	Recap	
5	October 27	**Philadelphia Eagles**	**L** 24–28	3–1–1	Griffith Stadium	33,691	Recap	
6	November 3	at **Pittsburgh Steelers**	**L** 7–14	3–2–1	Forbes Field	39,060	Recap	
7	November 10	**Boston Yanks**	**W** 17–14	4–2–1	Griffith Stadium	33,691	Recap	
8	November 17	at Chicago Bears	**L** 20–24	4–3–1	Wrigley Field	43,315	Recap	
9	November 24	at **Philadelphia Eagles**	**W** 27–10	5–3–1	Shibe Park	36,366	Recap	
10	December 1	Green Bay Packers	**L** 7–20	5–4–1	Griffith Stadium	33,691	Recap	
11	December 8	at **New York Giants**	**L** 0–31	5–5–1	Polo Grounds	60,337	Recap	
Note: Intra-division opponents are in **bold** text.

== Roster ==
1946 Washington Redskins final roster
Backs: 18 Frank Akins LB/FB; 00 Steve Bagarus RB/CB; 33 Sammy Baugh QB/P; 61 Bob DeFruiter CB/RB; 34 Jim Gaffney RB; 77 Jack Jacobs FB/QB/S/P; 38 Jack Jenkins FB/LB; 35 Wilbur Moore CB/RB; 25 Dick Poillon FB/LB/K; 32 Sal Rosato LB/FB; 99 Eddie Saenz RB/CB; 41 Dick Todd CB/RB; 30 Jim Youel S/QB	Linemen/Linebackers: 42 John Adams T/DT; 55 Ki Aldrich C/LB; 17 Don Avery DT/T; 20 Al Couppee G/DG/FB; 53 Al DeMao C/LB; 31 Clyde Ehrhardt DG/G; 60 John Jaffurs G/DG; 49 John Koniszewski T/DT; 16 John Steber G/DG; 46 Paul Stenn T/DT; 39 Clem Stralka DG/G; 21 Bill Ward T/DT; 37 Bill Young DT/T	Ends/Receivers: 43 Ed Cifers; 40 John Kovatch; 45 Ted Lapka; 15 John Lookabaugh; 19 Jim Peebles; 22 Doug Turley; rookies in italics

== Standings ==
NFL Eastern Division
	W	L	T	PCT	DIV	PF	PA	STK
New York Giants	7	3	1	.700	5–2–1	236	162	W1
Philadelphia Eagles	6	5	0	.545	5–3	231	220	W2
Pittsburgh Steelers	5	5	1	.500	4–3–1	136	117	L2
Washington Redskins	5	5	1	.500	4–3–1	171	191	L2
Boston Yanks	2	8	1	.200	0–7–1	189	273	L1

Note: Tie games were not officially counted in the standings until 1972.
