= Ed Mieszkowski =

American football player (1925–2004)

No. 41
- Position: Tackle

Personal information
- Born: October 14, 1925; Chicago, Illinois, U.S.
- Died: February 15, 2004 (aged 78); Lombard, Illinois, U.S.
- Listed height: 6 ft 3 in (1.91 m)
- Listed weight: 220 lb (100 kg)

Career information
- High school: Tilden (Chicago)
- College: Notre Dame (1943–1945)
- NFL draft: 1946: 7th round, 52nd overall pick

Career history
- Brooklyn Dodgers (1946–1947)

Awards and highlights
- National champion (1943)

Career AAFC statistics
- Games played: 23
- Games started: 7
- Stats at Pro Football Reference

Edward Thomas Mieszkowski (October 14, 1925 – February 15, 2004) was an American professional football tackle who played two seasons with the Brooklyn Dodgers of the All-America Football Conference (AAFC). He played college football at the University of Notre Dame, and was selected by the Boston Yanks in the seventh round of the 1946 NFL draft.

== Early life ==
Mieszkowski participated in high school football and wrestling at Tilden High School in Chicago, Illinois.

== College career ==
Mieszkowski played for the Notre Dame Fighting Irish from 1943 to 1945. He played in the 1946 College All-Star Game against the Los Angeles Rams.

== Professional career ==
Mieszkowski was selected by the Boston Yanks in the seventh round with the 52nd pick in the 1946 NFL Draft.

He played in 23 games, starting seven, for the Brooklyn Dodgers from 1946 to 1947.

== Coaching career ==
Mieszkowski was a coach at Mt. Carmel High School from 1948 to 1954. He first served as a coach under head coach Terry Brennan and the team won several city championships. He became head coach upon the departure of Brennan and then won several championships. Mieszkowski became the line coach at Marquette University in 1956 and spent several years there.

== Personal life ==
Mieszkowski started the Tilden Tech Alumni Association and later took over Notre Dame's Monogram Club, an alumni association for athletes. He developed progressive multiple sclerosis in 1954. He became a financial planner after his coaching career. Mieszkowski died on February 15, 2004, at his home in Lombard, Illinois due to complications from multiple sclerosis.
