= Roger Robinson (American football coach) =

American football player and coach (1924–2004)

Biographical details
- Born: November 29, 1923; Endicott, New York, U.S.
- Died: April 24, 2004 (aged 79); Columbia, South Carolina, U.S.

Playing career
- 1945–1946: Syracuse
- Position: Quarterback

Coaching career (HC unless noted)
- 1947–1949: Lebanon Valley (assistant)
- 1950–1962: Port Jervis HS (NY)
- 1963–1979: Cortland

Roger I. Robinson (November 11, 1924 – April 24, 2004) was an American football player and coach. A former Syracuse University quarterback, Robinson served as the head coach at the State University of New York College at Cortland from 1963 to 1979. During his career, he took a sabbatical to study head and neck injuries.

Robinson was selected by the Washington Redskins in the 22nd round of the 1946 NFL draft.
