= Flip McDonald =

American football player (1921–2002)

No. 34, 81, 58
- Position: End

Personal information
- Born: February 12, 1921; Webb City, Missouri, U.S.
- Died: February 12, 2002 (aged 81); Quapaw, Oklahoma, U.S.
- Listed height: 6 ft 2 in (1.88 m)
- Listed weight: 200 lb (91 kg)

Career information
- High school: Commerce (OK)
- College: Oklahoma

Career history
- Brooklyn Tigers (1944); Philadelphia Eagles (1944-1946); Bethlehem Bulldogs (1946-1947); New York Yankees (1948); Paterson Panthers (1948); Ottawa Rough Riders (1949)

Career statistics
- Games: 19
- Stats at Pro Football Reference

Donald Gene "Flip" McDonald (February 12, 1921 – February 12, 2002) was an American football player who played at the end position on both offense and defense. He played college football for Tulsa and professional football for the Brooklyn Tigers, Philadelphia Eagles, and New York Yankees.

== Early life ==
Greene was born in 1922 in Yukno or Shawnee, Oklahoma. He attended Shawnee High School in Oklahoma.

== College football and military service ==
Gene played college football at Oklahoma from 1940 to 1942.

== Professional football and military service ==
He played professional football in the National Football League (NFL) for the Brooklyn Tigers in 1944 and the Philadelphia Eagles from 1944 to 1946.

After previously being rejected for military service due to past football injuries, McDonald was inducted in early 1946 into the Army for service in occupation duty in the Pacific.

After his military service, he played in the All-America Football Conference (AAFC) for the New York Yankees during their 1948 season. He appeared in a total of 19 NFL and AAFC games. At the end of the 1948 season, he was named to the All-AAFC team by the league's coaches. He also played for the Bethlehem Bulldogs in 1946 and 1947 and the Paterson Panthers in 1948 and the Ottawa Rough Riders in 1949. He appeared in nine games, eight as a starter, for Ottawa.

== Later life ==
In December 1948, McDonald was hired as head football coach at Quapaw High School in Oklahoma. He also served as the school's principal until retiring from those positions in 1963. At that time, he became the principal of Quapaw's elementary school. He died in 2002 in Quapaw, Oklahoma, at age 81.
