= Dick Loepfe =

American football player (1922–2010)

No. 64
- Position: Offensive tackle

Personal information
- Born: January 1, 1922; Milwaukee, Wisconsin, U.S.
- Died: October 31, 2010 (aged 88); Milwaukee, Wisconsin, U.S.
- Listed height: 6 ft 2 in (1.88 m)
- Listed weight: 230 lb (104 kg)

Career information
- High school: East Division (Milwaukee)
- College: Wisconsin
- NFL draft: 1946: 11th round, 91st overall pick

Career history
- Chicago Cardinals (1948–1949)

Career NFL statistics
- Games played: 13
- Games started: 4
- Stats at Pro Football Reference

Richard P. Loepfe (January 1, 1922 – October 31, 2010) was an American professional football offensive tackle in the National Football League for the Chicago Cardinals (1948–1949). He played at the collegiate level at the University of Wisconsin–Madison.
