= Joe Signaigo =

American football player (1923–2007)

No. 31, 24
- Position: Guard

Personal information
- Born: February 9, 1923; Memphis, Tennessee, U.S.
- Died: January 16, 2007 (aged 83); Memphis, Tennessee, U.S.
- Listed height: 6 ft 1 in (1.85 m)
- Listed weight: 220 lb (100 kg)

Career information
- High school: Memphis Catholic
- College: Notre Dame (1942-1943, 1946-1947)
- NFL draft: 1946: 10th round, 90th overall pick

Career history
- New York Yankees (1948-1949); New York Yanks (1950)

Awards and highlights
- First-team All-Pro (1950); 3× National champion (1943, 1946, 1947)

Career NFL/AAFC statistics
- Games played: 38
- Games started: 33
- Fumble recoveries: 2
- Stats at Pro Football Reference

Joseph Salvatore Signaigo (February 9, 1923 – January 16, 2007) was an American professional football player who was a guard in the All-America Football Conference (AAFC) and the National Football League (NFL). He played college football for the Notre Dame Fighting Irish. He played for the AAFC's New York Yankees (1948–1949) and the NFL's New York Yanks (1950).
