= Harmon Rowe =

American football player (1923–2002)

No. 74, 90, 22
- Positions: Defensive back, halfback

Personal information
- Born: August 22, 1923; Livingston, Texas, U.S.
- Died: January 26, 2002 (aged 78); Whitehouse, Texas, U.S.
- Listed height: 6 ft 0 in (1.83 m)
- Listed weight: 182 lb (83 kg)

Career information
- High school: Livingston
- College: Baylor (1941-1942); San Francisco (1946)
- NFL draft: 1946: 3rd round, 18th overall pick

Career history
- New York Yankees (1947–1949); New York Giants (1950–1952)

Career NFL/AAFC statistics
- Rushing yards: 18
- Rushing average: 2.3
- Interceptions: 11
- Stats at Pro Football Reference

Harmon Beasley "Nook" Rowe (August 22, 1923 – January 26, 2002) was an American football player. Known primarily as a defensive back, he also played at offensive halfback, wingback, and fullback. He played professional football in the All-America Football Conference (AAFC) for the New York Yankees (1947–1949) and in the National Football League (NFL) for the New York Giants (1950–1952). He also played college football for Baylor (1941–1942) and San Francisco (1946) and also played for the 1944 and 1945 Fleet City teams while serving in the Navy during World War II.

== Early life ==
Rowe was born in Livingston, Texas, in 1923. He attended Livingston High School. He was a triple-threat player for Livingston's 1939 football team, winning a reputation as a "sensational running and passing quarterback." He also played at guard on Livingston's basketball team.

== College and military service ==
In 1940, the 17-year-old Rowe enrolled at Lon Morris College in Jacksonville, Texas, seeing action as a backup quarterback. He transferred to Baylor University in 1941. He played for the Baylor Bears freshman football team in 1942. In December 1942, Lloyd Gregory of The Houston Post described Rowe as "a splendid passer and dangerous breakaway runner." He also won a varsity letter with the Baylor basketball team in 1943.

From 1943 to 1945, with World War II underway. Rowe served in the United States Navy. He was stationed in California played for the Navy's "Fleet City" football team in 1944. In an October 1944 game against the California Golden Bears, he intercepted a pass and returned it 60 yards for a touchdown and scored a second touchdown on offense. The following year, he helped lead the 1945 Fleet City Bluejackets football team to an 11–0–1 record.

After his military service, Rowe returned to college and played for the San Francisco Dons in 1946.

== Professional football ==
Rowe was selected by the Pittsburgh Steelers in the third round (18th overall pick) of the 1946 NFL draft. He signed with the Steelers in July 1947. He was cut by the Steelers in mid-August. In late August 1947, he signed with the New York Yankees of the All-America Football Conference (AAFC). He played for the Yankees from 1947 to 1949. The AAFC folded after the 1949 season, and Rowe was allocated to the New York Giants, playing at defensive back from 1950 to 1952. He was part of the Giants' famous four-deep defensive secondary along with Tom Landry, Emlen Tunnell, and Otto Schnellbacher that was known as the "umbrella defense".

Rowe appeared in a total of 31 AAFC and 29 NFL games. He had 11 interceptions which he returned for a total of 162 yards.

== Later life ==
Rowe was an assistant coach of the Mobile Buccaneers of the Southern Football League in 1964. He later worked for H.B. Zachary, retiring in 1986. He and his wife, Winona June Rowe, had a daughter, Lynn. Rowe died in 2002 at age 78 in Whitehouse, Texas.
