= Leo Riggs =

American football player (1923–1995)

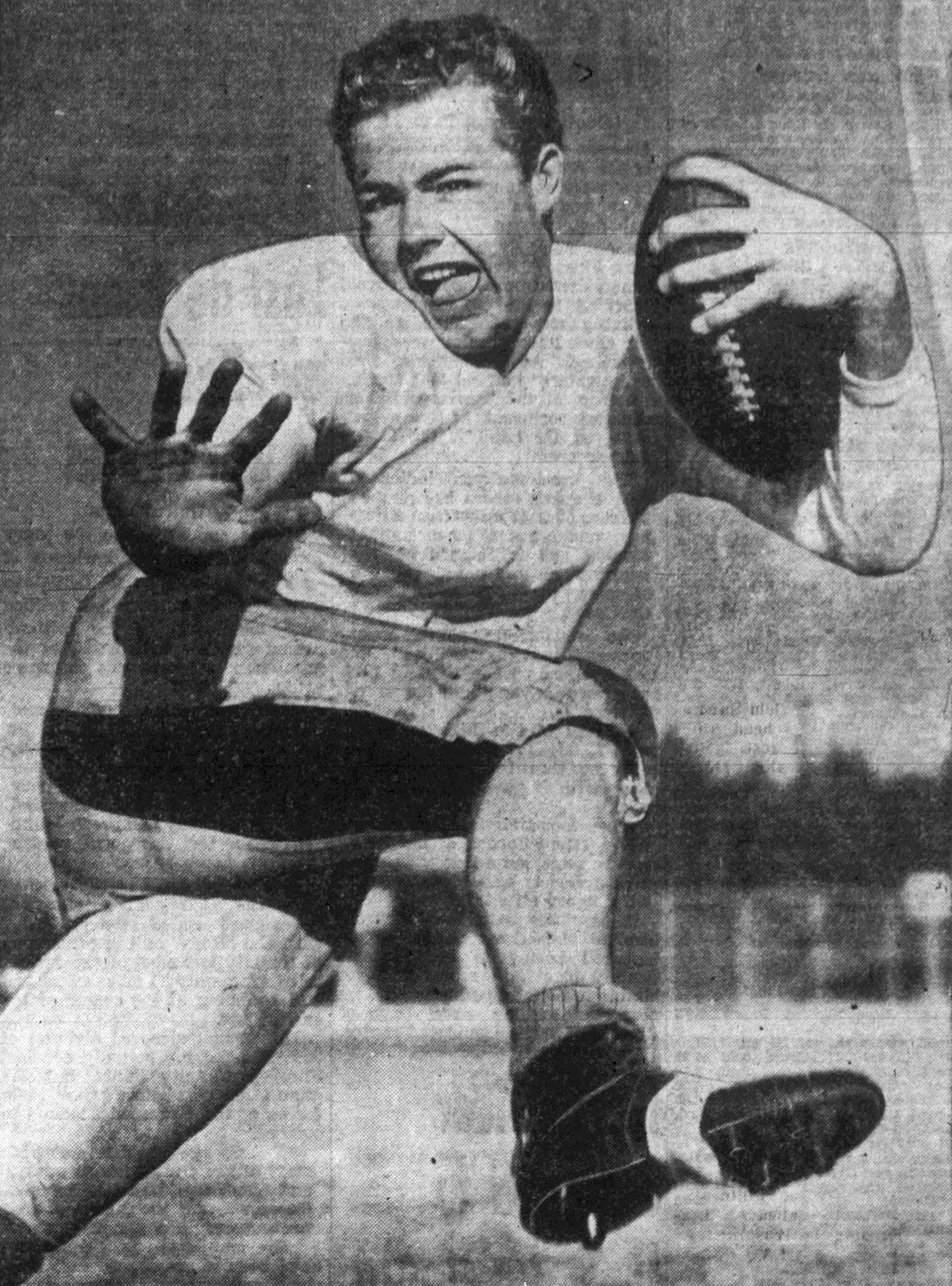
- Leo Riggs, circa 1941

Profile
- Position: Quarterback

Personal information
- Born: September 11, 1923
- Died: June 14, 1995 (aged 71)
- Listed height: 5 ft 11 in (1.80 m)
- Listed weight: 180 lb (82 kg)

Career information
- High school: Bell (CA)
- College: USC (1942, 1946)

Rex Leo Riggs (September 11, 1923 – June 14, 1995) was an American football player. He played college football at USC and was the seventh player selected in the 1946 NFL draft.

== Early life ==
Riggs was born in Maywood, California, in 1923. He was the son of Hiram Riggs and Alice Simkins. He attended Bell High School in Bell, California. He was selected as an all-Southern California prep halfback while at Bell High. He was teammates at Bell with John Ferraro.

== Football and military service ==
Riggs played college football as a triple-threat quarterback for the Trojans in 1942 and 1946. After the 1942 season, USC coach Jeff Cravath rated Riggs as "the best frosh prospect he had ever seen, bar none." He served in the United States Navy from 1943 to 1945. He was selected by the Philadelphia Eagles in the first round (seventh overall pick) of the 1946 NFL draft.

== Later life ==
Riggs worked for 15 years as a customer service representative for Mauer and Elliott. He was married to Mary Alice Riggs and had four sons and four daughters. He died in Indio, California, in 1995 at age 71.
