= Walt Slater =

American football player (1920–2012)

No. 31
- Position: Tailback

Personal information
- Born: January 31, 1920; Providence, Rhode Island, U.S.
- Died: May 11, 2012 (aged 92); St. Augustine, Florida, U.S.
- Listed height: 5 ft 11 in (1.80 m)
- Listed weight: 187 lb (85 kg)

Career information
- High school: Massanutten Military Academy
- College: Tennessee
- NFL draft: 1946: 5th round, 37th overall pick

Career history
- Pittsburgh Steelers (1947)

Awards and highlights
- NCAA punt return leader (1941)

Career NFL statistics
- Rushing yards: 167
- Rushing average: 3.6
- Passing yards: 215
- TD–INT: 1-5
- Passer rating: 32.5
- Stats at Pro Football Reference

Walter Edward Slater (January 31, 1920 – May 11, 2012) was an American professional football player. He played college football for the Tennessee Volunteers football. In 1941, he led all NCAA major college players with an average of 20.4 yards per punt return. After serving in the U.S. Army Air Corps during World War II, he later played professional football in the National Football League (NFL), appearing in 11 games for the Pittsburgh Steelers during the 1947 NFL season. During his time with the Steelers, he totaled 167 rushing yards and 215 passing yards. He also led the NFL with 435 punt return yards in 1947. In 1948, Slater retired from the NFL and was hired as the backfield coach for the NC State Wolfpack football team. He was the football coach at St. Augustine High School in St. Augustine, Florida from 1950 to 1961.

== See also ==
- List of NCAA major college yearly punt and kickoff return leaders
