= Jim Lecture =

American football player (1924–1999)

No. 37
- Position: Guard

Personal information
- Born: October 29, 1924; Chicago, Illinois, U.S.
- Died: December 19, 1999 (aged 75)
- Listed height: 5 ft 10 in (1.78 m)
- Listed weight: 220 lb (100 kg)

Career information
- High school: St. George (Evanston, Illinois)
- College: Washington University; Northwestern
- NFL draft: 1946: 8th round, 68th overall pick

Career history
- Buffalo Bisons (1946)

Awards and highlights
- Third-team All-American (1945); First-team All-Big Ten (1945)
- Stats at Pro Football Reference

James Wayne Lecture (October 29, 1924 — December 19, 1999) was an American football guard who played for one season in the All-America Football Conference (AAFC) for the Buffalo Bisons. After playing college football for Washington University in St. Louis and Northwestern, he was drafted in the eighth round of the 1946 NFL draft by the Philadelphia Eagles. He played for the Bisons in 1946.
