= Wop Drumstead =

American football player (1898–1946)

Profile
- Position: Guard

Personal information
- Born: September 4, 1898; Hammond, Indiana, U.S.
- Died: May 18, 1946 (aged 47)
- Listed weight: 185 lb (84 kg)

Career information
- College: none

Career history
- Hammond Scatenas (1921–1923); Hammond Boosters (1924–1925); Hammond Pros (1925); Hammond Boosters (1925–1926); Hammond Colonials (1929)

Career statistics
- Games played: 1
- Games started: 1
- Stats at Pro Football Reference

Walter Drumstead (born Dremstadt; September 4, 1898 – May 18, 1946) was an American football guard who played one game in the National Football League (NFL) for the Hammond Pros. He did not attend college, and also played independent ball with the Hammond Scatenas, Boosters, and Colonials.

He was born Walter Dremstadt on September 4, 1898, in Hammond, Indiana. He did not attend college, and a 1923 article called him, "from the college of hard knocks."

In 1921, Drumstead started a football career with the independent Hammond Scatenas. He joined the Hammond Boosters in 1924 after three seasons played with the Scatenas, and scored a touchdown in one of his first appearances with the team.

After playing most of the 1925 season with the Boosters, Drumstead left the team for one game to play in the National Football League (NFL) with the Hammond Pros. He was a starter in their 0–13 loss against the Chicago Cardinals, and returned to the Boosters afterwards. The Times reported him as a "fan favorite". He played for the Boosters again in 1926.

Drumstead played the left guard position for the Hammond Colonials in 1929.

He died in on May 18, 1946, at the age of 47.
