= Jack Itzel =

American football player (1924–1966)

No. 37
- Position: Fullback

Personal information
- Born: November 12, 1924; Pittsburgh, Pennsylvania, U.S.
- Died: December 21, 1966 (aged 42); Wilkinsburg, Pennsylvania, U.S.
- Listed height: 6 ft 0 in (1.83 m)
- Listed weight: 190 lb (86 kg)

Career information
- High school: Central Catholic (Pittsburgh)
- College: Georgetown (1942); Pittsburgh (1943)
- NFL draft: 1945: 17th round, 165th overall pick

Career history
- Pittsburgh Steelers (1945)

Career NFL statistics
- Rushing yards: 11
- Rushing average: 2.8
- Receptions: 1
- Receiving yards: 4
- Stats at Pro Football Reference

John Francis Itzel Jr. (November 12, 1924 – December 21, 1966) was an American professional football fullback who played one season for the Pittsburgh Steelers of the National Football League (NFL). He played college football at two different colleges, at Georgetown University for the Georgetown Hoyas football team and at the University of Pittsburgh for the Pittsburgh Panthers football team. He was drafted by the Pittsburgh Steelers in the seventeenth round of the 1945 NFL draft.
