= Frank Dancewicz =

American football player (1924–1985)

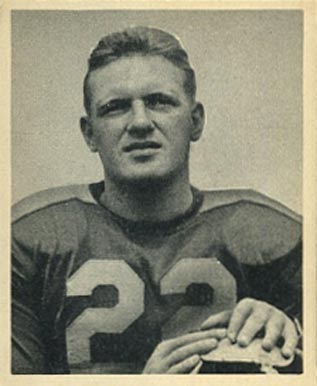
- Dancewicz on a 1948 Bowman football card

No. 22
- Position: Quarterback

Personal information
- Born: October 3, 1924; Lynn, Massachusetts, U.S.
- Died: June 26, 1985 (aged 60); Boston, Massachusetts, U.S.
- Listed height: 5 ft 10 in (1.78 m)
- Listed weight: 187 lb (85 kg)

Career information
- High school: Lynn Classical
- College: Notre Dame (1942-1945)
- NFL draft: 1946: 1st round, 1st overall pick

Career history
- Boston Yanks (1946–1948); Bethlehem Bulldogs (1949)

Awards and highlights
- National champion (1943); Second-team All-American (1945)

Career NFL statistics
- Passing attempts: 238
- Passing completions: 96
- Completion percentage: 40.3%
- TD–INT: 12–29
- Passing yards: 1,551
- Passer rating: 40.1
- Stats at Pro Football Reference

Francis Joseph "Boley" Dancewicz (/ˈdænsəwɪts/ DAN-sə-wits October 3, 1924 – June 26, 1985) was an American professional football quarterback and coach. He played college football for the Notre Dame Fighting Irish and was selected first overall by the Boston Yanks of the National Football League (NFL) in the 1946 NFL draft. He played professionally for the Yanks from 1946 to 1948. After his playing career, he worked as a physical education teacher and football coach.

== Early life ==
Dancewicz, 1941

Dancewicz was born in 1924 in Lynn, Massachusetts, the son of Felix and Magdalena (Jakusiak) Dancewicz. He was the quarterback for the football team at Lynn Classical High School, leading his team to state championships in 1940 and 1941. The Lynn team also defeated a team from New Britain, Connecticut, to win the 1941 New England championship. He was selected by the Eastern Massachusetts Interscholastic Sportswriters Association as the outstanding football player of both the 1940 and 1941 seasons. He was a triple-threat player who was described as "ace passer, wizard punter, canny playcaller, pass interceptor par excellence, capable ball toter."

Asked in 1945 about his nickname "Boley", Dancewicz explained: "They've called me that since I started to school. Maybe it came out of my being of Polish descent. Anyhow, I like it."

== Notre Dame ==
Dancewicz played college football at Notre Dame from 1942 to 1945. As a sophomore, he was an understudy to Angelo Bertelli and Johnny Lujack of the 1943 Notre Dame Fighting Irish football team that won a national championship. As a junior and senior, he became one of the nation's leading passers, "an ideal leader and field general", "a spark plug, an elusive broken field runner nad an excellent punter." He was captain of the 1945 Notre Dame team and was selected as a first-team All-American by the Central Press and as a second-team All-American by several other selectors.

== Professional football ==
Dancewicz was selected by the Boston Yanks with the first overall pick in the 1946 NFL draft. He signed a contract with the Yanks in January 1946.

As a rookie in 1946, he saw limited action, appearing in eight games, one as a starter, completing 13 of 34 passes (38.2%) for 162 yards, one touchdown, and six interceptions.

In 1947, Dancewicz appeared in 12 games, completing 66 of 169 passes (39.1%) for 1,203 yards, 11 touchdowns, and 18 interceptions. He ranked ninth in the NFL in passing yards. He also rushed for 145 yards on 47 carries (3.1 yards per carry) and a touchdown.

In 1948, Dancewicz appeared in only three games, none as a starter, completing 17 of 35 passes (48.6%) for 186 yards with zero touchdowns and five interceptions.

In 1949, he played for the Bethlehem Bulldogs of the American Football League. He also served as backfield coach at Lafayette College during the 1949 season.

== Family and later years ==
Dancewicz was a lifelong resident of Lynn, Massachusetts. In 1950, he became head football coach at Salem High School. He also coached football at Lynn Classical High School, Haverhill High School, Boston University, and Lafayette College. He later worked as the supervisor of physical education for the Lynn public schools; he returned to teaching at the end of his career as a physical education teacher at Lynn Vocational Technical Institute. He also taught swimming at Camp Christopher in Danvers, Massachusetts for over 30 years.

Dancewicz married Audrey Helen Kerr. They had a son, Gary, and four daughters, Carol Pizzotti, Deborah Dancewicz, Marianne Spinney, and Rita Dancewicz.

He died in June 1985 at age 60 at the University Hospital in Boston. He died from a serious spinaly injury sustained when he fell from a ladder outside his home in Lynn, Massachusetts. He was buried at Pine Grove Cemetery in Lynn.

His son, Gary Dancewicz, played at Boston College. His grandson Chris Pizzotti was a quarterback at Harvard.
