= 1946 NFL Championship Game =

Coordinates: 40.831°N 73.937°W

- Cover of the 1946 Championship Play-Off Program
Chicago Bears (Western) (8–2–1)	New York Giants (Eastern) (7–3–1)
24	14
Head coach: George Halas	Head coach: Steve Owen
	1	2	3	4	Total
CHI	14	0	0	10	24
NYG	7	0	7	0	14
- Date: December 15, 1946
- Stadium: Polo Grounds; Manhattan, New York
- Favorite: Chicago by 7–10 points
- Referee: Ronald Gibbs
- Attendance: 58,346

Radio in the United States
- Network: ABC
- Announcers: Harry Wismer

Location in the United States

The 1946 NFL Championship Game was the 14th annual championship game of the National Football League (NFL), played December 15 at the Polo Grounds in New York City, with a record-breaking attendance of 58,346.

The game matched the New York Giants (7–3–1), champions of the Eastern Division, against the Western Division champion Chicago Bears (8–2–1). The Giants had won the regular season game 14–0 at the Polo Grounds seven weeks earlier on October 27, but the Bears were seven to ten point favorites. It was the fourth championship game in the history of the Bears-Giants rivalry.

This was the fifth and final NFL Championship game played at the Polo Grounds and the fourth of six meetings between the Bears and Giants in the title game.

Tied after three quarters, Chicago won 24–14 for their seventh NFL title, their fifth victory in eight NFL championship game appearances. The attendance record stood for another nine years, until the 1955 title game in Los Angeles.

== Bribery scandal ==
The day before the game, two of the Giants' players, Frank Filchock and Merle Hapes, were accused of taking bribes to fix the game from Alvin Paris. Mayor William O'Dwyer subsequently informed Jack Mara, Wellington Mara and Bert Bell of the police evidence against the two.

Hours later, the four met at Gracie Mansion, and the mayor interviewed the players one at a time. Under questioning, Hapes admitted that he was offered a bribe, but Filchock denied being offered it.

Several hours later, Paris was arrested, and during his police interview made a full confession to bribing the players: Hapes was suspended by Bell, but Filchock was allowed to play. During Paris' trial weeks later, Filchock admitting taking the bribe under oath.

== Scoring summary ==
Sunday, December 15, 1946
Kickoff: 2 p.m. EST

- First quarter
  - CHI – Ken Kavanaugh 21-yard pass from Sid Luckman (Frank Maznicki kick), 7–0 CHI
  - CHI – Dante Magnani 19-yard interception return (Maznicki kick), 14–0 CHI
  - NY – Liebel 38-yard pass from Frank Filchock (Ken Strong kick), 14–7 CHI
- Second quarter
  - No scoring
- Third quarter
  - NY – Steve Filipowicz 5-yard pass from Filchock (Strong kick), 14–14 TIE
- Fourth quarter
  - CHI – Luckman 19-yard run (Maznicki kick), 21–14 CHI
  - CHI – FG Maznicki 26 yard, 24–14 CHI

== Officials ==
- Referee: Ronald Gibbs
- Umpire: Carl Brubaker
- Head linesman: Charlie Berry
- Field judge: William Grimberg

The NFL had only four game officials in 1946; the back judge was added the following season in 1947, the line judge in 1965, and the side judge in 1978.

== Players' shares ==
The gross receipts for the game, including radio and picture rights, was just under $283,000. Each player on the winning Bear team received $1,975, while Giants players made $1,295 each.

== See also ==
- 1946 NFL season
- History of the NFL championship
- Bears–Giants rivalry
- New York District Attorney Frank Hogan
