= 1946 NFL season =

American football season

Regular season
- Duration: September 20 – December 8, 1946
- East Champions: New York Giants
- West Champions: Chicago Bears

Championship Game
- Champions: Chicago Bears

NFL teams: West, East

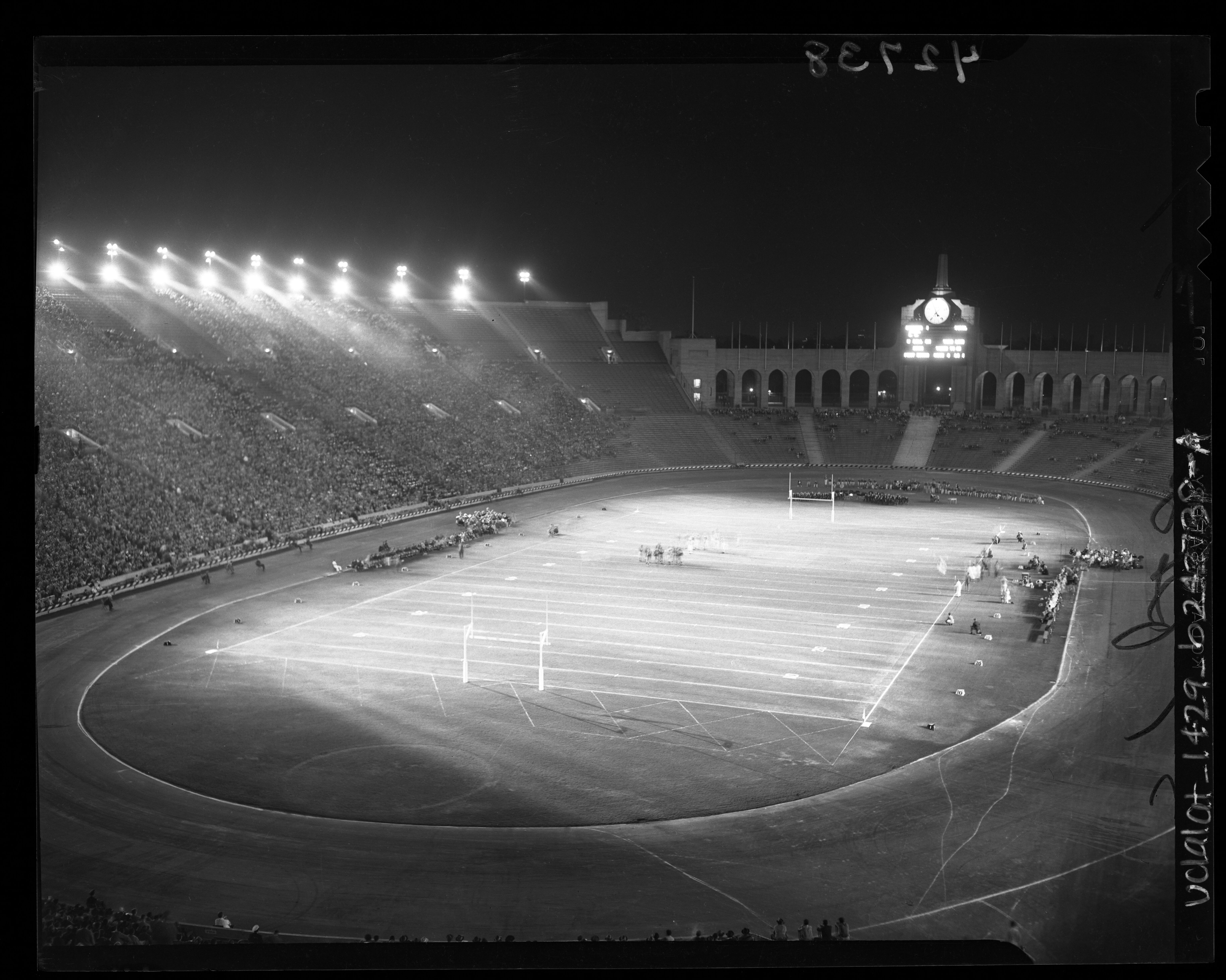
The Los Angeles Rams play the Washington Redskins at night at Los Angeles Coliseum, 1946

The 1946 NFL season was the 27th regular season of the National Football League. Before the season, Elmer Layden resigned as NFL Commissioner and Bert Bell, co-founder of the Philadelphia Eagles, replaced him. Meanwhile, the All-America Football Conference was formed to rival the NFL, and the Rams became the first NFL team based on the West Coast after they relocated from Cleveland, Ohio, to Los Angeles, California. A regular season game was played on Tuesday, the last until the 2010 season, on October 1, between New York and Boston.

The season ended when the Chicago Bears defeated the New York Giants in the NFL Championship Game.

== Draft ==
The 1946 NFL draft was held on January 14, 1946, at New York City's Commodore Hotel. With the first pick, the Boston Yanks selected quarterback Frank Dancewicz from the University of Notre Dame.

== Major rule changes ==
- A forward pass that strikes the goal posts is automatically ruled incomplete.
  - This is sometimes known as the "Baugh/Marshall Rule" after Washington Redskins quarterback Sammy Baugh and team owner George Preston Marshall: in the previous year's Championship Game, the Rams scored a safety when Baugh, attempting a pass from his own end zone, hit the goal posts. The two points provided the margin of victory, as the Rams won the game and the Championship 15–14, while Marshall was so outraged at the outcome that he was a major force in passing this rule change.
- The free substitution rule was repealed, and substitutions were limited to no more than three players at a time.
- The receiving team is permitted to return punts and missed field goal attempts from behind their own goal line.
- The penalty for an invalid fair catch signal is 5 yards from the spot of the signal.
- A fair catch signal is valid when it is made while the ball is in flight.

== Division races ==
In the Eastern Division, the Giants, Eagles, and Steelers all had 4-2 records in Week Seven of an 11-week season, while in the Western Division, the Bears' 10–7 win over the Packers on November 3 put them a game ahead of the Rams.

In Week Eight, the Giants beat the Eagles 45–17, the Steelers lost to Detroit 17–7, and the Bears beat the Rams 27–21 to widen their lead.

Week Nine saw Giants tie with Boston, 28–28, putting them at 5–2–1, while the Steelers beat the Eagles 10–7 to be a half-game behind at 5–3–1.

The teams met in New York in Week Ten, and the Giants' 7–0 win put them in front again.

The final week of the season had the 6–3–1 Giants hosting the 5–4–1 Redskins: a Washington win would have given them both 6–4–1 records and forced a playoff.

That became a moot point with New York's 31–0 win in front of 60,337 at the Polo Grounds: more than the 58,346 that went there for the Championship Game a week later.

== Final standings ==
NFL Eastern Division
	W	L	T	PCT	DIV	PF	PA	STK
New York Giants	7	3	1	.700	5–2–1	236	162	W1
Philadelphia Eagles	6	5	0	.545	5–3	231	220	W2
Pittsburgh Steelers	5	5	1	.500	4–3–1	136	117	L2
Washington Redskins	5	5	1	.500	4–3–1	171	191	L2
Boston Yanks	2	8	1	.200	0–7–1	189	273	L1

Note: Tie games were not officially counted in the standings until 1972.

NFL Western Division
	W	L	T	PCT	DIV	PF	PA	STK
Chicago Bears	8	2	1	.800	6–1–1	289	193	W1
Los Angeles Rams	6	4	1	.600	5–2–1	277	257	W2
Chicago Cardinals	6	5	0	.545	5–3	260	198	W2
Green Bay Packers	6	5	0	.545	3–5	148	158	L1
Detroit Lions	1	10	0	.091	0–8	142	310	L4

== NFL Championship Game ==
Chicago Bears 24, New York Giants 14, at the Polo Grounds in New York City on December 15, 1946

== League leaders ==
Statistic	Name	Team	Yards
Passing	Sid Luckman	Chicago Bears	1826
Rushing	Bill Dudley	Pittsburgh	604
Receiving	Jim Benton	Los Angeles	981

== Awards ==
Joe F. Carr Trophy (Most Valuable Player)	Bill Dudley, Halfback, Pittsburgh

== Coaching changes ==
- Chicago Bears: George Halas returned after serving in the U.S. Navy during World War II. In his place since the middle of the 1942 season, Hunk Anderson and Luke Johnsos served as co-coaches of the Bears.
- Chicago Cardinals: Phil Handler was replaced by Jimmy Conzelman.
- Pittsburgh Steelers: Jim Leonard was replaced by Jock Sutherland.
- Washington Redskins: Dudley DeGroot was replaced by Turk Edwards.

== Stadium changes ==
The relocated Los Angeles Rams moved from Cleveland's League Park to Los Angeles Memorial Coliseum

== Deaths ==
=== January ===
- January 22 – Lee Kizzire, age 30, Fullback, Detroit Lions in 1937.

=== February ===
- February 7 – Ward Connell, age 44, Split End, 1926 Chicago Cardinals
- February 14 – Art Haley, age 50, played Running back for 1920 Canton Bulldogs, 1921 Dayton Triangles, and 1923 Akron Pros

=== April ===
- April 13 – Pahl Davis, Age 42, Fullback, 1922 Green Bay Packers

=== May ===
- May 6 – Steve Sader, age 26, Running back for the 1943 Pitt-Phil Steagles.
- May 10 – Bill Clark, age 54, Guard, 1920 Dayton Triangles
- May 16 – Koester Christensen, age 41, Split End, 1930 Portsmouth Spartans
- May 18 – Wop Drumstead, Guard, 1925 Hammond Pros

=== June ===
- June 28 – John Howell, Age 30, Running Back, Green Bay Packers, Ninth round selection in the 1938 NFL draft

=== July ===
- July 6 – Fred Brumm, age 58, Tackle, 1921 Tonawanda Kardex

=== September ===
- September 3 – Duke Hanny, Age 48, Offensive line and Running Back, for the Chicago Bears from 1923 to 1927, and Providence Steam Roller from 1928 to 1930 and Green Bay Packers 1930.

=== August ===
- August 25 – Don Jackson, age 32, Running Back and Defensive Back for the Philadelphia Eagles in 1936.

=== October ===
- October 1 – Johnnie Hudson, Age 47, Running Back, for the Washington Senators in 1922.
- October 22 – Doc Ledbetter, age 36, Running Back, Chicago Cardinals and Staten Island Stapletons from 1932 to 1933.

=== November ===
- November 28 – Tom Henry, Age 51, Wing Back Rock Island Independents
