= Boston Yanks =

National Football League team based in Boston, Massachusetts

Logo

General information
- Founded: 1944
- Stadium: Fenway Park (Boston); Braves Field [a few regular season games] (Boston)
- Headquartered: Boston, Massachusetts
- Colors: Kelly green, gold, white

Personnel
- Owner: Ted Collins
- Head coach: Herb Kopf (1944–1946); Maurice J. "Clipper" Smith (1947–1948)

Team history
- Boston Yanks (1944, 1946–1948); The Yanks (1945)

League / conference affiliations
- National Football League old Eastern Division

The Boston Yanks were a National Football League team based in Boston, Massachusetts, that played from 1944 to 1948. The team played its home games at Fenway Park. Any games that conflicted with the Boston Red Sox baseball schedule in the American League were held at Braves Field of the cross-town National League team, the Boston Braves. Team owner Ted Collins, who managed singer and television show host Kate Smith (1907–1986) for thirty years, picked the name Yanks because he originally wanted to run a team that would play at New York City's old Yankee Stadium. The Yanks managed only a 2–8 record during their first regular season.

Because of a shortage of players caused by World War II, the Yanks were temporarily merged with the erratic founding APFA member Dayton Triangles' franchise, then known as the Brooklyn Tigers, for the 1945 season, and styled as just the Yanks with no home city named. The merged team played four home games in Boston and one in New York and finished with a 3–6–1 record.

When Brooklyn Tigers owner Dan Topping announced his intention to join the newly established rival professional football league, the All-America Football Conference (AAFC), in 1946, his NFL franchise, which was a founding APFA member that he had moved from Dayton, Ohio in 1929, was revoked and all of its players were assigned to the Yanks, with the original Triangles legacy being carried on by this group. After five continuous losing seasons, Collins finally was allowed to move to New York City. But instead of an official relocation, he asked the league to officially fold his Boston franchise and give him a new franchise, for a Federal tax write-off. The League granted his request, and Collins named his new team the New York Bulldogs. However, like many of this franchise's moves, the NFL considers them to have folded, while the players and assets simply moved, ultimately keeping the Dayton Triangles' legacy alive as the last remaining Ohio League member. Despite the franchise's assets moving to a new city and carrying on the team's legacy, the Boston Yanks are the only officially defunct NFL team ever to have a first overall pick in the NFL draft. They had it twice, in 1944 and 1946, selecting quarterbacks Angelo Bertelli and Frank Dancewicz from Notre Dame.

== First-round draft selections ==
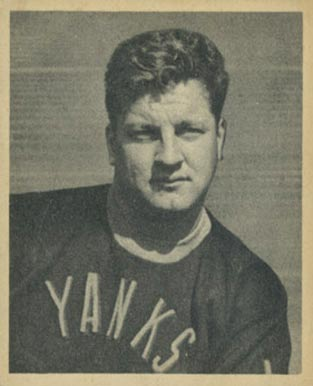
Guard Fritz Barzilauskas

Boston Yanks first-round draft picks
Year	Player name	Position	College
1944	Angelo Bertelli	Back	Notre Dame
1945	Eddie Prokop	Back	Georgia Tech
1946	Frank Dancewicz	Back	Notre Dame
1947	Fritz Barzilauskas	Guard	Yale
1948	Vaughn Mancha	Center	Alabama

== Pro Football Hall of Fame ==
Boston Yanks Hall of Famers
Players
No.	Name	Position	Tenure	Inducted
—	Clarence "Ace" Parker	QB, HB	1945	1972

== Season-by-season ==
Year	W	L	T	Finish	Coach
1944	2	8	0	4th East	Herb Kopf
1945	3	6	1	3rd East	Herb Kopf
1946	2	8	1	5th East	Herb Kopf
1947	4	7	1	3rd East	Clipper Smith
1948	3	9	0	5th East	Clipper Smith
Totals	14	38	3		
