= 1947 Pittsburgh Steelers season =

NFL sports season

- Head coach: Jock Sutherland
- Home stadium: Forbes Field

Results
- Record: 8–4
- Division place: 2nd NFL Eastern
- Playoffs: Lost Divisional Playoffs (vs. Eagles) 0–21

The 1947 Pittsburgh Steelers season was the franchise's 15th season in the National Football League (NFL). The team improved on its 1946 record by winning eight games and losing four. This record tied for the lead in the Eastern Division and qualified the Steelers for the franchise's first playoff berth. It was the Steelers' only postseason appearance before 1972.

It was Jock Sutherland's second and final year as head coach; he died the following April after being found wandering around in a field in Kentucky. Once flown back to Pittsburgh, he was diagnosed as having two brain tumors. He only lived a few more days.

== Pre-Season Changes ==
In 1946, the Steeler offense and defense featured the NFL MVP in the person of Bill Dudley. The Virginia grad and Army veteran led the NFL in rushing, interceptions, punt returns and all-purpose yards. Despite being wildly popular with fans and fellow players, Dudley and Coach Sutherland could not get along. Ultimately, Dudley asked Art Rooney, Sr. to trade him and the owner reluctantly agreed.

Dudley was traded to the Detroit Lions for Bob Cifers and Paul White. Additionally, the Steelers received the Lions' 1948 first round draft pick. Both White and Cifers had a demonstrable positive effect on the team. Cifers played brilliantly and was one of the top punters in the NFL that year.

=== Draft ===
1947 Pittsburgh Steelers draft
Round	Pick	Player	Position	College	Notes
1	5	Hub Bechtol	E	Texas	Signed with the Baltimore Colts (AAFC)
3	16	John Mastrangelo	T	Notre Dame	
5	29	Frank Wydo	T	Cornell	
6	38	Frank Aschenbrenner	RB	Northwestern	Returned to college
7	49	Bryant Meeks	C	South Carolina	
8	58	Jerry Shipkey *	LB	UCLA	Played beginning in 1948
9	69	Bert Vander Clute	G	Wesleyan	
10	78	Paul Gibson	E	NC State	
11	89	Jack Medd	C	Wesleyan	
12	98	Jack Fitch	B	North Carolina	
13	109	Ara Parseghian	HB	Miami (OH)	Signed with the Cleveland Browns (AAFC)
14	118	Red Moore	G	Penn State	
15	129	Larry Bruno	B	Geneva	
16	138	Ralph Jenkins	C	Clemson	
17	149	Elbie Nickel *	E	Cincinnati	
18	158	Bill Cregar	G	Holy Cross	
19	169	Jerry Mulready	E	North Dakota State	Signed with the Chicago Rockets (AAFC)
20	178	Warren Smith	T	Kansas Wesleyan	
21	189	Fred Hamilton	T	Vanderbilt	
22	198	Fred Taylor	E	TCU	
23	209	Binks Bushmiaer	B	Vanderbilt	
24	218	Paul Davis	FB	Otterbein	
25	229	Tommy Kalmanir	HB	Nevada	Returned to college
26	238	Don Mohr	E	Baldwin Wallace	
27	249	Art Young	G	Dartmouth	
28	258	Ralph Sazio	T	William & Mary	
29	269	Dick Pitzer	E	Army	
30	278	Tom Stalloni	T	Delaware	
31	287	Vince DiFrancesca	G	Northwestern	
32	294	Warren Lahr *	DB	Case Western Reserve	Returned to college
Made roster * Made at least one Pro Bowl during career

== Regular season ==
=== Schedule ===
Game	Date	Opponent	Result	Record	Venue	Attendance	Sources
1	September 21	Detroit Lions	**W** 17–10	1–0	Forbes Field	34,691	Recap
2	September 29	Los Angeles Rams	**L** 7–48	1–1	Forbes Field	35,658	Recap
3	October 5	at **Washington Redskins**	**L** 26–27	1–2	Griffith Stadium	36,565	Recap
4	October 12	at **Boston Yanks**	**W** 30–14	2–2	Fenway Park	18,894	Recap
5	October 19	**Philadelphia Eagles**	**W** 35–24	3–2	Forbes Field	33,538	Recap
6	October 26	at **New York Giants**	**W** 38–21	4–2	Polo Grounds	41,736	Recap
7	November 2	at Green Bay Packers	**W** 18–17	5–2	State Fair Park	30,073	Recap
8	November 9	**Washington Redskins**	**W** 21–14	6–2	Forbes Field	36,257	Recap
9	November 16	**New York Giants**	**W** 24–7	7–2	Forbes Field	35,000	Recap
10	November 23	at Chicago Bears	**L** 7–49	7–3	Wrigley Field	34,142	Recap
11	November 30	at **Philadelphia Eagles**	**L** 0–21	7–4	Shibe Park	37,218	Recap
12	December 7	**Boston Yanks**	**W** 17–7	8–4	Forbes Field	31,398	Recap
Note: Intra-division opponents are in **bold** text.

=== Game summaries ===
==== Week 1 ====
Sunday, September 21: Detroit Lions

	1	2	3	4	Total
Lions	7	0	3	0	**10**
**Steelers**	0	7	0	10	**17**

at Forbes Field, Pittsburgh, Pennsylvania

- Game time:
- Game weather:
- Game attendance: 34,691
- Referee:

Scoring Drives:

- Detroit – Dudley 30 pass from Zimmerman (Zimmerman kick)
- Pittsburgh – Jansante 15 pass from Slater (Glamp kick)
- Detroit – FG Zimmerman 18
- Pittsburgh – Repko 48 fumble run (Glamp kick)
- Pittsburgh – FG Glamp 35

==== Week 2 ====
Monday, September 29: Los Angeles Rams

	1	2	3	4	Total
**Rams**	6	14	7	21	**48**
Steelers	0	7	0	0	**7**

at Forbes Field, Pittsburgh, Pennsylvania

- Game time:
- Game weather:
- Game attendance: 35,658
- Referee:

Scoring Drives:

- Los Angeles – FG Waterfield 30
- Los Angeles – FG Waterfield 45
- Los Angeles – Hoerner 4 run (Waterfield kick)
- Pittsburgh – Lach 4 run (Glamp kick)
- Los Angeles – Benton 11 pass from Waterfield (Waterfield kick)
- Los Angeles – Washington 9 lateral from Waterfield (Waterfield kick)
- Los Angeles – Hubbell 45 pass from Waterfield (Waterfield kick)
- Los Angeles – Hubbell 15 pass from Hardy (Waterfield kick)
- Los Angeles – Washington 6 run

==== Week 3 ====
Sunday, October 5): Washington Redskins

	1	2	3	4	Total
Steelers	3	7	14	2	**26**
**Redskins**	0	7	13	7	**27**

at Griffith Stadium, Washington, DC

- Game time:
- Game weather:
- Game attendance: 36,565
- Referee:

Scoring Drives:

- Pittsburgh – FG Glamp 15
- Washington – Nussbaumer 55 pass from Baugh (Poillon kick)
- Pittsburgh – Lach 15 pass from Clement (Glamp kick)
- Washington – Poillon 3 pass from Baugh (kick failed)
- Pittsburgh – Compagno 64 int (Glamp kick)
- Washington – Taylor 35 pass from Baugh (Poillon kick)
- Pittsburgh – Sullivan 50 pass from Clement (Glamp kick)
- Pittsburgh – Safety, Baugh stepped out of end zone
- Washington – Farmer 1 run (Poillon kick)

==== Week 4 ====
Sunday, October 12: Boston Yanks

	1	2	3	4	Total
**Steelers**	7	7	7	9	**30**
Yanks	0	0	0	14	**14**

at Fenway Park, Boston, Massachusetts

- Game time:
- Game weather:
- Game attendance: 18,894
- Referee:

Scoring Drives:

- Pittsburgh – Lach 1 run (Glamp kick)
- Pittsburgh – White 52 run (Glamp kick)
- Pittsburgh – Lach 1 run (Glamp kick)
- Pittsburgh – Safety, Dancewicz tackled in end zone by Bova
- Pittsburgh – Clement 1 run (Glamp kick)
- Boston – Currivan 33 pass from Dancewicz (Scollard kick)
- Boston – Currivan 20 pass from Dancewicz (Maznicki kick)

==== Week 5 ====
Sunday, October 19: Philadelphia Eagles

	1	2	3	4	Total
Eagles	10	14	0	7	**31**
**Steelers**	7	7	0	21	**35**

at Forbes Field, Pittsburgh, Pennsylvania

- Game time:
- Game weather:
- Game attendance: 33,538
- Referee:

Scoring Drives:

- Pittsburgh – Compagno 39 pass from Clement (Glamp kick)
- Philadelphia – Pihos 43 pass from Thompson (Patton kick)
- Philadelphia – FG Patton 14
- Philadelphia – Pritchard 69 pass from Thompson (Patton kick)
- Pittsburgh – Clement 5 run (Glamp kick)
- Philadelphia – Pihos 17 pass from Thompson (Patton kick)
- Pittsburgh – Garnaas 19 pass from Clement (Glamp kick)
- Pittsburgh – Clement 23 run (Glamp kick)
- Pittsburgh – Lach 1 run (Glamp kick)

==== Week 6 ====
Sunday, October 26: New York Giants

	1	2	3	4	Total
**Steelers**	7	17	7	7	**38**
Giants	0	7	7	7	**21**

at Polo Grounds, New York, New York

- Game time:
- Game weather:
- Game attendance: 41,736
- Referee:

Scoring Drives:

- Pittsburgh – Jansante 7 pass from Lach (Glamp kick)
- New York – Carroll 18 pass from Governali (Strong kick)
- Pittsburgh – Lach 1 run (Glamp kick)
- Pittsburgh – Lach 1 run (Glamp kick)
- Pittsburgh – FG Glamp 37
- Pittsburgh – Garnaas 68 pass from Clement (Glamp kick)
- New York – Blumenstock 1 run (Strong kick)
- Pittsburgh – Sinkovitz 47 int (Glamp kick)
- New York – Livingston 65 pass from Governali (Strong kick)

==== Week 7 ====
Sunday, November 2: Green Bay Packers

	1	2	3	4	Total
**Steelers**	3	6	7	2	**18**
Packers	10	0	0	7	**17**

at Wisconsin State Fair Park, Milwaukee, Wisconsin

- Game time:
- Game weather:
- Game attendance: 30,073
- Referee:

Scoring Drives:

- Green Bay – Goodnight 69 pass from Jacobs (Cuff kick)
- Green Bay – FG Cuff 16
- Pittsburgh – FG Glamp 23
- Pittsburgh – Jansante 37 pass from Clement (kick failed)
- Pittsburgh – Compagno 55 int (Glamp kick)
- Pittsburgh – Safety, Jacobs tackled in end zone by Calcagni
- Green Bay – Luhn 27 pass from Jacobs (Cuff kick)

==== Week 8 ====
Sunday, November 9: Washington Redskins

	1	2	3	4	Total
Redskins	0	7	0	7	**14**
**Steelers**	7	7	7	0	**21**

at Forbes Field, Pittsburgh, Pennsylvania

- Game time:
- Game weather:
- Game attendance: 36,257
- Referee:

Scoring Drives:

- Pittsburgh – Lach run (Glamp kick)
- Pittsburgh – Compagno 2 run (Glamp kick)
- Washington – Taylor 24 pass from Baugh (Poillon kick)
- Pittsburgh – Clement 18 run (Glamp kick)
- Washington – Castiglia 2 run (Poillon kick)

==== Week 9 ====
Sunday, November 16: New York Giants

	1	2	3	4	Total
Giants	0	0	7	0	**7**
**Steelers**	3	0	0	21	**24**

at Forbes Field, Pittsburgh, Pennsylvania

- Game time:
- Game weather:
- Game attendance: 35,000
- Referee:

Scoring Drives:

- Pittsburgh – FG Glamp 12
- New York – Paschka 2 run (Strong kick)
- Pittsburgh – Compagno 4 run (Glamp kick)
- Pittsburgh – Jansante 19 pass from Clement (Glamp kick)
- Pittsburgh – Seabright 39 int (Glamp kick)

==== Week 10 ====
Sunday, November 23: Chicago Bears

	1	2	3	4	Total
Steelers	0	7	0	0	**7**
**Bears**	7	14	7	21	**49**

at Wrigley Field, Chicago, Illinois

Scoring Drives:

- Game time:
- Game weather:
- Game attendance: 34,142
- Referee:

Scoring Drives:

- Chicago Bears – McAfee 2 run (McLean kick)
- Chicago Bears – Kavanaugh 6 pass from Luckman (McLean kick)
- Chicago Bears – McAfee 4 run (McLean kick)
- Pittsburgh – Jansante 15 pass from Morales (Glamp kick)
- Chicago Bears – Kindt 3 run (McLean kick)
- Chicago Bears – Keane 6 pass from Luckman (McLean kick)
- Chicago Bears – Gulyanics 44 run (McLean kick)

==== Week 11 ====
Sunday, November 30: Philadelphia Eagles

	1	2	3	4	Total
Steelers	0	0	0	0	**0**
**Eagles**	7	0	0	14	**21**

at Shibe Park, Philadelphia, Pennsylvania

- Game time:
- Game weather:
- Game attendance: 37,218
- Referee:

Scoring Drives:

- Philadelphia – Van Buren 2 run (Patton kick)
- Philadelphia – Muha 28 run (Patton kick)
- Philadelphia – Mackrides 1 run (Patton kick)

==== Week 12 ====
Sunday, December 7: Boston Yanks

	1	2	3	4	Total
Yanks	0	7	0	0	**7**
**Steelers**	10	0	0	7	**17**

at Forbes Field, Pittsburgh, Pennsylvania

- Game time:
- Game weather:
- Game attendance: 31,398
- Referee:

Scoring Drives:

- Pittsburgh – Mastrangelo recovered blocked punt in end zone (Glamp kick)
- Pittsburgh – FG Glamp 30
- Boston – Golding 14 run (Maznicki kick)
- Pittsburgh – Lach 1 run (Glamp kick)

== Standings ==
NFL Eastern Division
	W	L	T	PCT	DIV	PF	PA	STK
Philadelphia Eagles	8	4	0	.667	6–2	308	242	W1
Pittsburgh Steelers	8	4	0	.667	6–2	240	259	W1
Boston Yanks	4	7	1	.364	3–4–1	168	256	L2
Washington Redskins	4	8	0	.333	3–5	295	367	W1
New York Giants	2	8	2	.200	1–6–1	190	309	L1

Note: Tie games were not officially counted in the standings until 1972.

== Postseason ==
The 1947 team was the most successful team in club history to date. It was the Steelers' first playoff appearance, the first time winning more than four games consecutively, and the club posted a franchise-best 8–4 record. Though the Steelers lost the playoff, fans and players were excited for their future.

However, fate would interrupt again when head coach Jock Sutherland took a trip to visit family in Kentucky. He ran off the road and was found wondering in a muddy field. Flown back to Pittsburgh, Sutherland died four days later on April 11, 1948, due to complications from a brain tumor. It was a sudden and disheartening end to a successful period in team history. The Steelers did not play in the postseason again until 1972.

Round	Date	Opponent	Result	Venue	Attendance	Sources
Divisional	December 21	Philadelphia Eagles	L 0–21	Forbes Field	35,729	Recap

=== Game summary ===
Sunday, December 21: Philadelphia Eagles

	1	2	3	4	Total
Eagles	7	7	7	0	21
Steelers	0	0	0	0	0

at Forbes Field, Pittsburgh, Pennsylvania

- Game time: 2:00 pm EST
- Game weather: 39 °F (4 °C)
- Game attendance: 35,729
- Referee:

Scoring Drives:

- Philadelphia – Van Buren 15 pass from Thompson (Patton kick)
- Philadelphia – Ferrante 28 pass from Thompson (Patton kick)
- Philadelphia – Pritchard 79 punt return (Patton kick)

Source:a

== Roster ==
1947 Pittsburgh Steelers final roster
Backs: 45 Bob Cifers RB/CB/P; 0 Johnny Clement RB; 44 Tony Compagno CB/FB; 77 Paul Davis RB/S; 30 Bill Garnaas RB; 17 Joe Glamp RB/K; 35 Gene Hubka RB; 37 Steve Lach FB/LB; 16 Gonzalo Morales S/RB; 33 Charley Seabright FB/MLB; 31 Walt Slater S/RB; 42 Paul White CB/RB; Ends/Receivers: 85 Tony Bova; 28 Bob Davis; 23 Sam Gray; 54 Val Jansante; 55 Charley Mehelich; 81 Elbie Nickel	Linemen/Linebackers: 47 Ralph Calcagni DT/T; 21 Chuck Cherundolo C/OLB; 73 Bill Cregar G/MG; 25 Al Drulis OLB; 40 Bill Hornick T/DT; 65 John Mastrangelo G/OLB; 64 Bryant Meeks OLB/C; 72 Red Moore G/MG; 22 John Perko G/MG; 38 Joe Repko T/DT; 57 Frank Sinkovitz OLB/C; 12 Nick Skorich G/MG; 78 Paul Stenn T/DT; 75 Jack Wiley T/DT; 79 Frank Wydo DT/T; Reserve: 27 Bob Sullivan RB (IR); Rookies in italics

=== All-Pro Honors ===
- Val Jansante 2nd Team, UPI
- Charley Mehelich 2nd Team, Chicago Herald
- Red Moore 1st Team, UPI
- Johnny Clement 2nd Team AP, 2nd Team UPI
- Chuck Cherundolo 2nd Team AP, 2nd Team UPI
