= 1948 Pittsburgh Steelers season =

NFL team season

- Head coach: John Michelosen
- Home stadium: Forbes Field

Results
- Record: 4–8
- Division place: 3rd (tied) NFL Eastern
- Playoffs: Did not qualify

The 1948 Pittsburgh Steelers season was the franchise's 16th season in the National Football League (NFL). The team finished the season with a record of 4–8, failing to qualify for the playoffs. This season marked the first played with John Michelosen as head coach.

== Regular season ==
=== Schedule ===
Game	Date	Opponent	Result	Record	Venue	Attendance	Sources
1	September 26	at Washington Redskins	**L** 14–17	0–1	Griffith Stadium	32,084	Recap
2	October 3	Boston Yanks	**W** 24–14	1–1	Forbes Field	26,215	Recap
3	October 10	Washington Redskins	**W** 10–7	2–1	Forbes Field	28,969	Recap
4	October 17	at Boston Yanks	**L** 7–13	2–2	Fenway Park	7,208	Recap
5	October 24	at New York Giants	**L** 27–34	2–3	Polo Grounds	13,443	Recap
6	October 31	Philadelphia Eagles	**L** 7–34	2–4	Forbes Field	32,474	Recap
7	November 7	Green Bay Packers	**W** 38–7	3–4	Forbes Field	26,058	Recap
8	November 14	Chicago Cardinals	**L** 7–24	3–5	Forbes Field	33,364	Recap
9	November 21	at Detroit Lions	**L** 14–17	3–6	Briggs Stadium	16,189	Recap
10	November 28	at Philadelphia Eagles	**L** 0–17	3–7	Shibe Park	26,001	Recap
11	December 5	New York Giants	**W** 38–28	4–7	Forbes Field	27,645	Recap
12	December 12	at Los Angeles Rams	**L** 14–31	4–8	LA Memorial Coliseum	27,967	Recap
Note: Intra-division opponents are in **bold** text.

== Standings ==
Program for the October 10 game with the Washington Redskins.

NFL Eastern Division
	W	L	T	PCT	DIV	PF	PA	STK
Philadelphia Eagles	9	2	1	.818	7–1	376	156	W1
Washington Redskins	7	5	0	.583	5–3	291	287	W1
New York Giants	4	8	0	.333	3–5	297	388	L2
Pittsburgh Steelers	4	8	0	.333	3–5	200	243	L1
Boston Yanks	3	9	0	.250	2–6	174	372	W1

Note: Tie games were not officially counted in the standings until 1972.

== Roster ==
1948 Pittsburgh Steelers final roster
Running backs: 45 Bob Cifers P; 0 Johnny Clement; 42 Ray Evans; 17 Joe Glamp K; 27 George Papach; 49 Jerry Shipkey LB; Receivers: 54 Val Jansante; 51 Roy Kurrasch; 81 Elbie Nickel; Defensive backs: 44 Tony Compagno CB/FB; 77 Paul Davis S; 48 Joe Gasparella CB/FB; 16 Gonzalo Morales S/RB; 22 Jerry NuzumCB/RB	Linemen/Linebackers: 21 Chuck Cherundolo C; 73 Bill Cregar DG/G; 28 Bob Davis DE/WR; 65 John Mastrangelo DG/T; 64 Bryant Meeks LB/C; 55 Charley Mehelich DE; 72 Red Moore G/DG; 60 Leo Nobile G; 46 Ed Ryan DE; 86 Carl Samuelson DT/T; 33 Charley Seabright LB/FB; 89 Hubert Shurtz T; 57 Frank Sinkovitz LB/C; 12 Nick Skorich G/DG; 62 Steve Suhey G; 75 Jack Wiley DT/T; 79 Frank Wydo T/DT; Rookies in italics

== Game summaries ==
=== Game 1 (Sunday September 26, 1948): Washington Redskins ===
	1	2	3	4	Total
Steelers	7	7	0	0	14
Redskins	7	0	0	10	17

at Griffith Stadium, Washington, DC

- Game time:
- Game weather:
- Game attendance: 32,084
- Referee:
- TV announcers:

Scoring drives:

- Washington – Castiglia 22 pass from Baugh (Poillon kick)
- Pittsburgh – Clement 28 run (Glamp kick)
- Pittsburgh – Glamp 38 pass from Clement (Glamp kick)
- Washington – Turley 33 fumble run (Poillon kick)
- Washington – FG Poillon 28

=== Game 2 (Monday October 3, 1948): Boston Yanks ===
	1	2	3	4	Total
Yanks	7	7	0	0	14
Steelers	0	7	3	14	24

at Forbes Field, Pittsburgh, Pennsylvania

- Game time:
- Game weather:
- Game attendance: 26,216
- Referee:
- TV announcers:

Scoring drives:

- Boston – Paschal 15 pass from Youel (Zimmerman kick)
- Boston – Pritko 33 fumble run (Zimmerman kick)
- Pittsburgh – Nickel 24 pass from Clement (Glamp kick)
- Pittsburgh – FG Glamp 35
- Pittsburgh – Seabright 7 pass from Clement (Glamp kick)
- Pittsburgh – Mosley 3 run (Glamp kick)

=== Game 3 (Sunday October 10, 1948): Washington Redskins ===
	1	2	3	4	Total
Redskins	0	0	0	7	7
Steelers	0	0	7	3	10

at Forbes Field, Pittsburgh, Pennsylvania

- Game time:
- Game weather:
- Game attendance: 28,969
- Referee:
- TV announcers:

Scoring drives:

- Pittsburgh – Clement 3 run (Glamp kick)
- Washington – Crisler 19 pass from Baugh (Poillon kick)
- Pittsburgh – FG Glamp 13

=== Game 4 (Sunday October 17, 1948): Boston Yanks ===
	1	2	3	4	Total
Steelers	0	0	0	7	7
Yanks	6	0	0	7	13

at Fenway Park, Boston, Massachusetts

- Game time:
- Game weather:
- Game attendance: 7,208
- Referee:
- TV announcers:

Scoring drives:

- Boston – Heywood 14 fumble run (kick failed)
- Boston – Seno 22 pass from Zimmerman (Zimmerman kick)
- Pittsburgh – Shipkey 1 run (Glamp kick)

=== Game 5 (Sunday October 24, 1948): New York Giants ===
	1	2	3	4	Total
Steelers	6	7	14	0	27
Giants	13	7	7	7	34

at Polo Grounds, New York, New York

- Game time:
- Game weather:
- Game attendance: 13,443
- Referee:
- TV announcers:

Scoring drives:

- New York – Sultatis 2 run (Williams kick)
- Pittsburgh – Shipkey 1 run (kick failed)
- New York – White 54 lateral from Cheverko after 35 kick return (kick failed)
- New York – Roberts 49 pass from Conerly (Williams kick)
- Pittsburgh – Jansante 12 pass from Evans (Glamp kick)
- Pittsburgh – Jansante 66 pass from Evans (Glamp kick)
- New York – Sulaitis 34 pass from Conerly (Williams kick)
- New York – Conerly 1 run (Williams kick)

=== Game 6 (Sunday October 31, 1948): Philadelphia Eagles ===
	1	2	3	4	Total
Eagles	3	14	0	17	34
Steelers	0	7	0	0	7

at Forbes Field, Pittsburgh, Pennsylvania

- Game time:
- Game weather:
- Game attendance: 32,474
- Referee:
- TV announcers:

Scoring Drives:

- Philadelphia – FG Patton 42
- Pittsburgh – Shipkey 1 run (Glamp kick)
- Philadelphia – Van Buren 20 run (Patton kick)
- Philadelphia – Ferrante 7 pass from Thompson (Patton kick)
- Philadelphia – Pritchard 55 punt return (Patton kick)
- Philadelphia – FG Patton 23
- Philadelphia – Pritchard 18 fumble run (Patton kick)

=== Game 7 (Sunday November 7, 1948): Green Bay Packers ===
	1	2	3	4	Total
Packers	0	0	0	7	7
Steelers	7	17	7	7	38

at Forbes Field, Pittsburgh, Pennsylvania

- Game time:
- Game weather:
- Game attendance: 26,058
- Referee:
- TV announcers:

Scoring drives:

- Pittsburgh – Jansante 7 pass from Evans (Glamp kick)
- Pittsburgh – FG Glamp 33
- Pittsburgh – Shipkey 1 run (Glamp kick)
- Pittsburgh – Evans 14 run (Glamp kick)
- Pittsburgh – Glamp 55 run (Glamp kick)
- Pittsburgh – Compagno 82 interception (Glamp kick)
- Green Bay – Goodnight 19 pass from Girard (Fritsch kick)

=== Game 8 (Sunday November 14, 1948): Chicago Cardinals ===
	1	2	3	4	Total
Cardinals	14	7	0	3	24
Steelers	7	0	0	0	7

at Forbes Field, Pittsburgh, Pennsylvania

- Game time:
- Game weather:
- Game attendance: 33,364
- Referee:
- TV announcers:

Scoring drives:

- Chicago Cardinals – Kutner 42 pass from Mallouf (Harder kick)
- Chicago Cardinals – Trippi 67 punt return (Harder kick)
- Pittsburgh – Shipkey 67 punt return (Glamp kick)
- Chicago Cardinals – Harder 8 run (Harder kick)
- Chicago Cardinals – FG Yablonski 41

=== Game 9 (Sunday November 21, 1948): Detroit Lions ===
	1	2	3	4	Total
Steelers	7	0	0	7	14
Lions	0	10	0	7	17

at Briggs Stadium, Detroit, Michigan

- Game time:
- Game weather:
- Game attendance: 16,189
- Referee:
- TV announcers:

Scoring drives:

- Pittsburgh – Shipkey 1 run (Glamp kick)
- Detroit – Dudley 19 pass from Enke (Pregulman kick)
- Detroit – FG Pregulman 33
- Detroit – Dudley 28 fumble run (Pregulman kick)
- Pittsburgh – Papach 2 run (Glamp kick)

=== Game 10 (Sunday November 28, 1948): Philadelphia Eagles ===
	1	2	3	4	Total
Steelers	0	0	0	0	0
Eagles	7	10	0	0	17

at Shibe Park, Philadelphia, Pennsylvania

- Game time:
- Game weather:
- Game attendance: 22,001
- Referee:
- TV announcers:

Scoring drives:

- Philadelphia – Pritchard 5 run (Patton kick)
- Philadelphia – Pihos 13 pass from Thompson (Patton kick)
- Philadelphia – FG Patton 31

=== Game 11 (Sunday December 5, 1948): New York Giants ===
	1	2	3	4	Total
Giants	7	0	7	14	28
Steelers	7	10	0	21	38

at Forbes Field, Pittsburgh, Pennsylvania

- Game time:
- Game weather:
- Game attendance: 27,645
- Referee:
- TV announcers:

Scoring drives:

- Pittsburgh – Evans 9 run (Glamp kick)
- New York – Minisi 6 run (Younce kick)
- Pittsburgh – FG Glamp 40
- Pittsburgh – Glamp 3 pass from Evans (Glamp kick)
- New York – Roberts 18 pass from Conerly (Younce kick)
- Pittsburgh – Shipkey 2 run (Glamp kick)
- Pittsburgh – Cifers 2 run (Glamp kick)
- Pittsburgh – Morales 36 fumble run (Glamp kick)
- New York – Johnson 11 pass from Conerly (Younce kick)
- New York – Swiacki 11 pass from Conerly (Younce kick)

=== Game 12 (Sunday December 12, 1948): Los Angeles Rams ===
	1	2	3	4	Total
Steelers	0	0	7	7	14
Rams	0	14	7	10	31

at Los Angeles Memorial Coliseum, Los Angeles, California

- Game time:
- Game weather:
- Game attendance: 27,967
- Referee:
- TV announcers:

Scoring drives:

- Los Angeles – Hickey 21 pass from Hardy (Waterfield kick)
- Los Angeles – Hubbell 8 pass from Hardy (Waterfield kick)
- Pittsburgh – Papach 1 run (Glamp kick)
- Los Angeles – Fears 29 pass from Waterfield (Waterfield kick)
- Los Angeles – FG Waterfield 47
- Los Angeles – Magnani 16 pass from Hardy (Gehrke kick)
- Pittsburgh – Papach 28 pass from Evans (Glamp kick)
