= 1947 NFL Championship Game =

Coordinates: 41.832°N 87.634°W

- Program for the 1947 Championship Game
Philadelphia Eagles (Eastern) (8–4)	Chicago Cardinals (Western) (9–3)
21	28
Head coach: Greasy Neale	Head coach: Jimmy Conzelman
	1	2	3	4	Total
PHI	0	7	7	7	21
CHC	7	7	7	7	28
- Date: December 28, 1947
- Stadium: Comiskey Park; Chicago, Illinois
- Favorite: Chicago by 12 points
- Attendance: 30,759

Radio in the United States
- Network: ABC
- Announcers: Harry Wismer, Red Grange

Location in the United States

The 1947 NFL Championship Game (formally: the 1947 World Professional Football Championship Game) was the 15th annual end-of-season title contest held by the National Football League (NFL). The game took place in icy conditions on December 28 at Comiskey Park in Chicago before an audience of 30,759 — well below stadium capacity.

This was the Cardinals' last playoff win as a franchise until January 2, 1999; at 51 years and five days, it was the longest post-season win drought in NFL history. As of 2026, this is the Cardinals’ last championship, and they now hold the longest title drought in North American sports. The team moved to St. Louis as the St. Louis Cardinals in 1960 and Arizona as the Phoenix Cardinals in 1988 (changing to Arizona Cardinals in 1994).

== Background ==
The game featured the Western Division champion Chicago Cardinals (9–3) and the Eastern Division champion Philadelphia Eagles (8–4). A week earlier, the Eagles defeated the Pittsburgh Steelers 21–0 in a tiebreaker playoff to determine the Eastern winner. Both the Eagles and Cardinals were making their first appearances in the championship game. The Cardinals had won the regular season meeting in Philadelphia three weeks earlier by 24 points and after a week off, were 12-point favorites to win the title game at home.

This was the second NFL title game played after Christmas Day, and the latest to date. Scheduled for December 21, it was pushed back a week due to the Eastern division playoff. The temperature at kickoff was 29 °F (−2 °C). On a frozen field, the Cardinals elected to wear sneakers. The decision paid off handsomely, as Chicago outgained Philadelphia on the ground 280 yards to just 60 for the day.

== Game summary ==
The Cardinals built a 14–0 lead in the second quarter, then the teams traded touchdowns. The Eagles closed the gap to 28–21 with five minutes to go, but the Cardinals controlled the ball the rest of the game on an extended drive to win the title.

This was the only NFL title game played at Comiskey Park and is one of two Cardinals NFL Championship victories. The two teams returned for a rematch in 1948 in Philadelphia, but the Eagles won in a snowstorm. The Cardinals have not won a league championship since this one, over seven decades ago, the longest drought in the NFL. They made it to Super Bowl XLIII in the 2008 season representing Arizona, but they lost to the Pittsburgh Steelers.

The Cardinals' win kept the NFL title within the city of Chicago; the North Side's Bears had won the previous season. The team did not receive championship rings until the 50th anniversary of their win in 1997.

== Starting lineups ==
Despite the fact that free substitution was part of the NFL in 1947, in keeping with the single-platoon tradition only eleven starters for each team were named. A total of 26 members of the Cardinals and 27 members of the Eagles saw game action, however. The starters were as follows:

Philadelphia Eagles	—	Chicago Cardinals
Name	Position	Name
Jack Ferrante	Left End	Bill Blackburn
Vic Sears	Left Tackle	Dick Plasman
Cliff Patton	Left Guard	Loyd "Pig" Arms
Alex Wojciechowicz	Center	Hamilton Nichols
Bucko Kilroy	Right Guard	Vince Banonis
Al Wistert	Right Tackle	Stan Mauldin
Pete Pihos	Right End	Jack Doolan
Pat McHugh	Quarterback	Bill Campbell
Steve Van Buren	Left Halfback	Red Cochran
Bosh Pritchard	Right Halfback	Marshall Goldberg
Joe Muha	Fullback	Walt Rankin

== Scoring summary ==
Chicago Cardinals 28, Philadelphia Eagles 21

Quarter	1	2	3	4	Total
Eagles	0	7	7	7	21
Cardinals	7	7	7	7	28

at Comiskey Park, Chicago, Illinois

- Date: December 28, 1947
- Game time: 1:05 p.m. CST
- Game attendance: 30,759
- Pro-Football-Reference.com

Game information

- First quarter
  - CHI – Charley Trippi 44-yard rush (Pat Harder kick). Cardinals 7–0
- Second quarter
  - CHI – Elmer Angsman 70-yard rush (Harder kick). Cardinals 14–0
  - PHI – Pat McHugh 53-yard pass from Tommy Thompson (Cliff Patton kick). Cardinals 14–7
- Third quarter
  - CHI – Charley Trippi 75-yard punt return (Harder kick). Cardinals 21–7
  - PHI – Steve Van Buren 1-yard rush (Patton kick). Cardinals 21–14
- Fourth quarter
  - CHI – Elmer Angsman 70-yard rush (Harder kick). Cardinals 28–14
  - PHI – Russ Craft 1-yard rush (Patton kick). Cardinals 28–21

Top passers

- PHI – Tommy Thompson – 27/44, 297 yards, 1 TD, 3 INT
- CHI – Paul Christman – 3/14, 54 yards, 0 TD, 2 INT

Top rushers

- PHI – Joe Muha – 8 rushes, 31 yards
- CHI – Elmer Angsman – 10 rushes, 159 yards, 2 TD

Top receivers

- PHI – Jack Ferrante – 8 receptions, 73 yards
- CHI – Billy Dewell – 1 reception, 38 yards

=== Statistics ===
Statistics	Philadelphia	Chicago
First downs	22	11
Rushing yards	60	282
Yards Per Carry	1.6	7.2
Passing yards	297	54
Interceptions	3	2
Sack Yds Lost	0	0
Net Pass Yards	297	54
Total yards	357	336
Fumbles-Lost	2-0	2-1
Turnovers	3	3
Penalties-Yards	7-55	10-97

== Officials ==
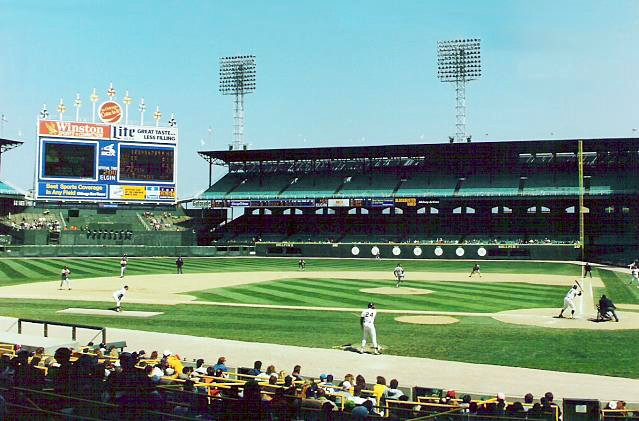
Now-defunct Comiskey Park in Chicago, Illinois, site of the 1947 NFL Championship Game.

The following five officials were used in the game. The NFL added a fifth official, the back judge, for the first time during the 1947 season

- Referee: Thomas Dowd
- Umpire: Harry Robb
- Head linesman: Dan Tehan
- Back judge: Carl Rebele
- Field judge: Henry Haines
- Alternate: Carl Brubaker

== Players' shares ==
The player compensation pool was set at 70% of net revenue — that is, total gross receipts, including paid gate and radio and motion picture rights, less costs for stadium rental and taxes. Total receipts were just under $160,000 and expenses nearly $40,000, for a net receipts pool of about $120,000. This generated a team pool of about $45,300 for the winning Cardinals, divided into 40 shares of $1,132. The losing Eagles similarly were allotted a pool of $30,200, split into 40 shares of $754.

A pool of about $8,400 for each of the divisional second place clubs — the Chicago Bears and Pittsburgh Steelers — was also established.

== See also ==
- 1947 NFL playoffs
