= 1947 NFL playoffs =

- Dates: December 21-28, 1947
- Season: 1947
- Teams: 3
- Games played: 2
- NFL Championship Game site: Comiskey Park; Chicago, Illinois
- Defending champions: Chicago Bears (did not qualify)
- Champion: Chicago Cardinals (2nd title)
- Runner-up: Philadelphia Eagles
- Conference runners-up: Pittsburgh Steelers; Chicago Bears
NFL playoffs
← 1943	1950 →

The 1947 National Football League season resulted in a tie for the Eastern Division title between the Philadelphia Eagles and Pittsburgh Steelers; both finished the regular season at 8–4, requiring a one-game playoff. They had split their two-game series in the season, with the home teams prevailing; the Steelers won by eleven on October 19, while the Eagles carded a 21–0 shutout on November 30 at Shibe Park.

The Steelers and Detroit Lions opened their seasons a week before the rest of the ten-team league on September 21, and completed their schedules on December 7. Philadelphia needed a win over the visiting Green Bay Packers on December 14 to force a playoff the following week, and won by fourteen points.

This division playoff game was the Steelers' first (and only until 1972) postseason appearance, and was played on December 21 at Forbes Field in Pittsburgh. The winner traveled to Chicago to play in the NFL championship game the following week against the Cardinals (9–3) at Comiskey Park. Originally scheduled for December 21, the playoff pushed the title game to December 28.

Scoring touchdowns in each of the first three quarters, the Eagles posted another 21–0 shutout to win the East title and advanced to the championship game in Chicago.

== Tournament bracket ==
Eastern Division playoff December 21			NFL Championship; December 28
			W	Chicago Cardinals	28
E	Pittsburgh	0	E	Philadelphia	21
E	Philadelphia	21

== Eastern Division championship ==
Philadelphia Eagles 21, Pittsburgh Steelers 0

Quarter	1	2	3	4	Total
Eagles	7	7	7	0	21
Steelers	0	0	0	0	0

at Forbes Field in Pittsburgh, Pennsylvania

- Date: December 21, 1947
- Game time: 2:00 p.m. EST
- Game weather: 39 °F (4 °C)
- Game attendance: 35,729
- Pro-Football-Reference

Game information

- First quarter
- PHI – Steve Van Buren 15-yard pass from Tommy Thompson (Cliff Patton kick). Eagles 7–0
- Second quarter
- PHI – Jack Ferrante 28-yard pass from Tommy Thompson (Patton kick). Eagles 14–0
- Third quarter
- PHI – Bosh Pritchard 79-yard punt return (Patton kick). Eagles 21–0

Top passers

- PIT – Johnny Clement – 4/16 yards, 52 yards
- PHI – Tommy Thompson – 11/17, 131 yards, 2 TD

Top rushers

- PIT – Johnny Clement – 14 rushes, 59 yards
- PHI – Steve Van Buren – 18 rushes, 45 yards

Top receivers

- PIT – Elbie Nickel – 2 receptions, 32 yards
- PHI – Jack Ferrante – 5 receptions, 73 yards, 1 TD

This remains the only postseason meeting between the Eagles and Steelers. This was also the first occurrence of a postseason matchup between two professional sports teams based in the state of Pennsylvania.
