= Joe Glamp =

American football player (1921–1989)

No. 17
- Positions: Halfback, Kicker

Personal information
- Born: May 13, 1921; Standard Shaft, Pennsylvania, U.S.
- Died: January 13, 1989 (aged 67); Greensburg, Pennsylvania, U.S.
- Listed height: 5 ft 11 in (1.80 m)
- Listed weight: 180 lb (82 kg)

Career information
- High school: Hurst High School
- College: LSU

Career history
- 1947–1949: Pittsburgh Steelers

Joseph J. Glamp (May 13, 1921 – January 13, 1989) was an American professional football player who was a halfback and placekicker in the National Football League (NFL). He played for the Pittsburgh Steelers from 1947 through 1949.

== Formative years ==
Glamp attended and played football at Hurst High School, located in Norvelt, Pennsylvania. Many sources mistakenly state that Glamp attended Mount Pleasant Area High School, located in Mount Pleasant, Pennsylvania; however, that school was not open until 1960 well after Glamp's high school time. That puts him at Hurst High School which merged with Ramsey High School in 1960 to form Mount Pleasant Area High School.

He then attended and played at Louisiana State University.

== NFL career ==
According to former Pittsburgh coach, Jock Sutherland, Glamp was the only Steeler in 1947 that could outrun guard, John Mastrangelo. On October 5, 1947, Glamp score six points (1 field goal and 3 extra points), however a field goal attempt with 25 seconds to play bounced off the left upright and resulted in a 27–26 Steelers loss to the Washington Redskins.

In a 1948 rematch Pittsburgh took possession on downs at the Washington 41 with about a minute and a half to go. It appeared that Bob Nussbaumer had sealed the game when he intercepted Johnny Clement's pass, however a penalty against the Redskins nullified the turnover. Glamp then missed a 21-yard field goal, but the Redskins were offsides. Another offside pushed the line of scrimmage down to the 3 yard line. Glamp' game-winner came on the next play.

For the 1948 season, Glamp set a Steelers scoring record, by posting 54 points that season. His record would stand until the 1950 season, when it was broken by Joe Geri. On October 23, 1949, Glamp recorded another 6 point game (1 field goal, 3 extra points) as the Steelers defeated the New York Bulldogs 24–13.
