= Steve Lach =

American football player and shot putter (1920–1961)

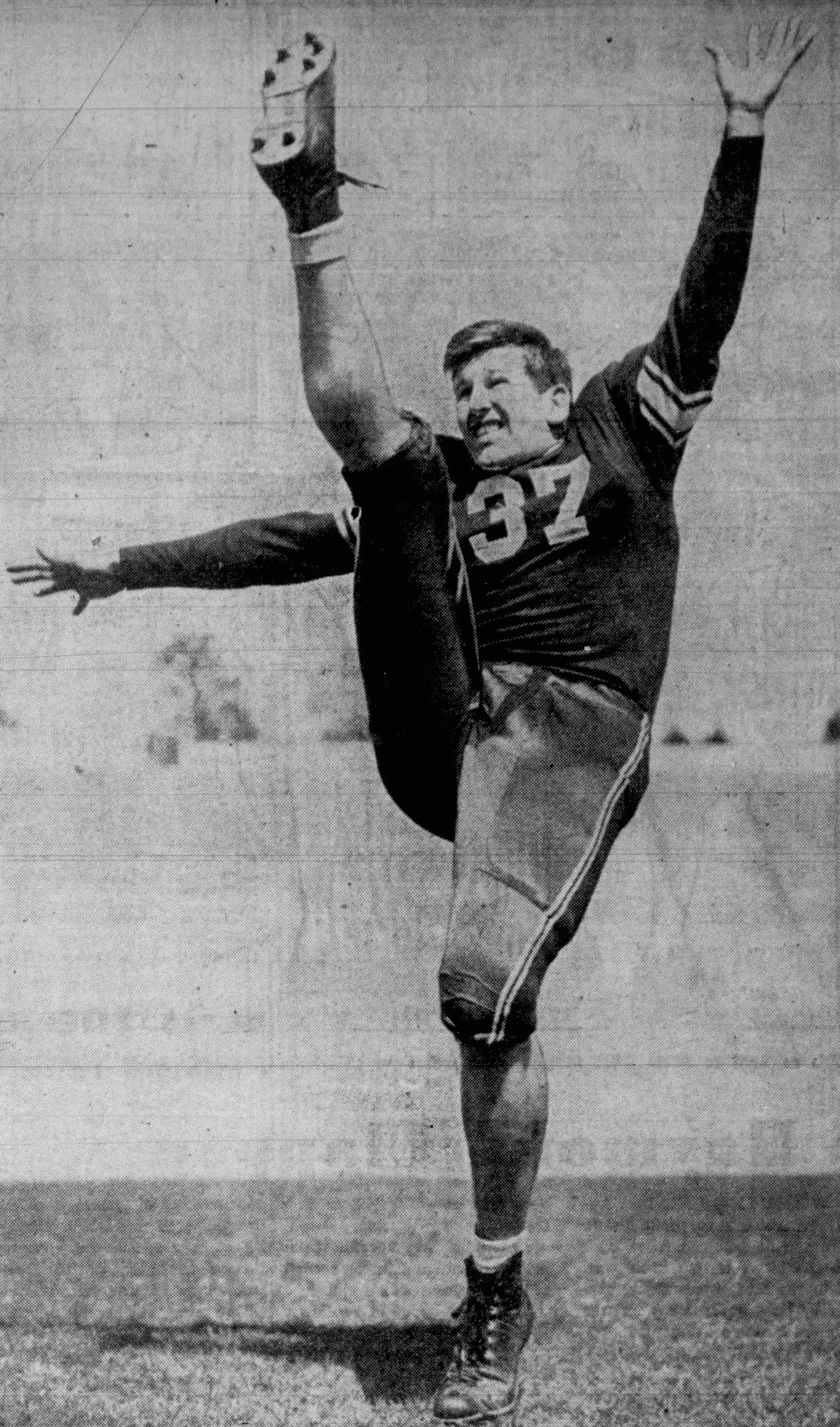
- Lach in 1941

No. 37
- Positions: Wingback, fullback, halfback

Personal information
- Born: August 6, 1920; Altoona, Pennsylvania, U.S.
- Died: July 12, 1961 (aged 40); Altoona, Pennsylvania, U.S.
- Listed height: 6 ft 2 in (1.88 m)
- Listed weight: 210 lb (95 kg)

Career information
- High school: Altoona
- College: Duke (1938-1941)
- NFL draft: 1942: 1st round, 4th overall pick

Career history
- Chicago Cardinals (1942); Pittsburgh Steelers (1946–1947)

Awards and highlights
- First-team All-American (1941); 2× First-team All-SoCon (1940, 1941)

Career NFL statistics
- Rushing yards: 580
- Rushing average: 3
- Receptions: 32
- Receiving yards: 360
- Total touchdowns: 18
- Stats at Pro Football Reference
- College Football Hall of Fame

Stephen John Lach (August 6, 1920 – July 12, 1961) was an American professional football player. Lach was among a list of sixty-one nominees to the College Football Hall of Fame in March 1960. He was elected in 1980.

== Track and field athlete ==
Lach competed in the 5th annual National AAU high school and prep school indoor track and field championships at Madison Square Garden, in February 1938. He placed 4th in the 12-pound shot put, with a distance of 40 feet and 6 inches. While a Duke student, Lach took part in the shot put and discus events in the April 1941 Penn Relay Carnival, held on Franklin Field at the University of Pennsylvania. He came in 4th in the discus competition, with a throw of 140 feet, 11 3/4 inches. In the April 1942 Penn Relay Carnival Lach placed 5th in the shot put with a distance of 46 feet, 9 3/4 inches. He was also 5th in the discus throw, with a distance of 138 feet.

== Duke halfback (1939–1942) ==
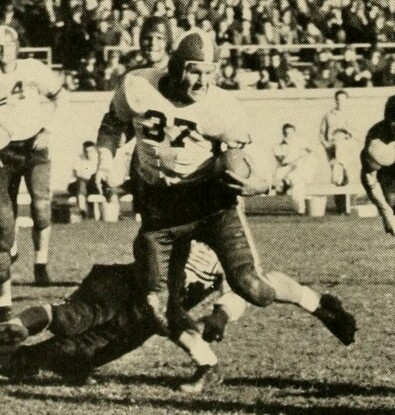
Lach during a 1942 game between Duke and the Maryland Terrapins

He played running back as a member of the varsity football team at Duke University. As a senior, he was a wingback, which allowed his team to take advantage of his fine blocking ability. His playing weight was 190 pounds.

Lach scored from a half yard out in a 37-0 Duke pasting of Colgate University at Wallace Wade Stadium, in October 1939. He carried three times after George McAfee set up the Blue Devils at the Red Raiders 8-yard-line. Lach passed 42 yards to Tommy Prothro for the final touchdown in a 33–6 win over Syracuse University on October 21. On the 7th play after halftime, Lach broke a 61-yard run for a touchdown at Groves Stadium, against Wake Forest University, on October 26. Wes McAfee tossed a 13-yard pass to Lach against Georgia Tech in the second quarter to complete a 54-yard drive. Lach was one of four Blue Devils selected to the eleven man Southern Conference 1940 Associated Press honor team.

Lach caught two passes from Moffat Storer for touchdowns at Pitt Stadium on October 25, 1941. Duke triumphed over Pittsburgh Panthers 27–7. Lach caught a high pass from Tom Davis at the three yard line, which he converted for a touchdown against Georgia Tech in November. This reception, together with a number of fine kicks, helped Duke beat the Engineers in Atlanta.

He ran just eight times versus the University of North Carolina, but escaped for 23 and 17 yard runs in the third quarter. He punted the Tar Heels into a hole at their own 5 yard line late in the 3rd quarter. In all he accounted for 61 of Duke's 194 rushing yards. Lach returned in the fourth quarter after leaving the field near the end of the third period. He appeared still shaken after slipping and being hit while off-balance as he attempted a cutback play. As he walked slowly to the sidelines the Duke fans began to chant a touchdown for Lach. Only moments later a Blue Devil teammate got into the end zone.

By the end of 1950 Wallace Wade had included only five sophomores as varsity starters in twenty-five years as a coach at the University of Alabama and Duke. Pooley Hubert and Johnny Mack Brown were the exceptions who played first team at Alabama. The Duke sophomores who played regularly for the varsity were Ace Parker, Lach, and Billy Cox.

== Chicago Cardinals (1942) ==
Lach was selected as the fourth overall pick in the first round of the 1942 NFL draft by the Chicago Cardinals. He was sworn into the U.S. Navy in Evanston, Illinois as a member of the Flying Cadets, in August 1942. At the time he was in Chicago training as a member of the College All Stars.

On September 14, 1942, Lach caught a pass from Bud Schwenk to account for the game's only touchdown, in the Cardinals' 7–0 victory over the Cleveland Rams, at Civic Stadium in Buffalo, New York. The 6-yard toss was batted by Lach with his left hand and then caught by him behind Bill Conkright. Against the Detroit Lions at Comiskey Park, Schwenk pounced on a loose ball fumbled by Harry Hopp on the last play of the third quarter. Schwenk then found right halfback Lach from the Lions' 20-yard-line for a touchdown, on the first play of the last period. The Green Bay Packers defeated the Cardinals despite trailing 13-10 midway through the fourth quarter in Chicago, on October 4. Once again the aerial combination of Schwenk passing to Lach dominated the highlights. Lach received a 20-yard pass and then raced in from the 15 in the first quarter. Lach accounted for one of two touchdowns the Cardinals made during a lopsided loss to the Chicago Bears on October 11. Schwenk lofted a 47-yard strike to Lach in the first quarter of a game witnessed by 38,500 fans.

In July 1943 Lach was scheduled to play with the College All-Star team against the N.F.L. champion Washington Redskins, at Dyche Stadium in Evanston. Otto Graham and Charley Trippi were other backs on the collegiate squad. Lach was kept from suiting up for the game by a directive preventing Navy athletes from participating in off-station contests, except as members of Navy teams.

== Great Lakes Blue Jackets (1943) ==
Lach ran for touchdowns of 13 and 65 yards as a member of the Great Lakes Blue Jackets on October 2, 1943. The 40–0 defeat of the Pittsburgh Panthers was the third win in four tries for the team of sailors. Lach scampered 28 yards for a third period touchdown in Great Lakes' 13–6 victory over Ohio State Buckeyes at the naval training stations' Ross Field Stadium, in Great Lakes, Illinois.

Lach played a key role in a last minute comeback upset of Notre Dame Fighting Irish on November 27. The Fighting Irish scored what seemed to be the winning touchdown against Great Lakes with merely one minute and six seconds left in the fourth quarter. Starting from his own 37-yard line Lach found Emil Sitko with a strike to the Notre Dame 46-yard line. He then took a snap from center, faded, was rushed, and abruptly lofted a high pass, directed to the far corner of the field. The football was caught by Paul Anderson, who had played the majority of the final period at quarterback. Anderson was running with intensity and was many yards behind the closest Irish defender. He gathered it in on the 7-yard line and ran into the end zone. With the extra point the Blue Jackets prevailed 19–14. It was a finish no Hollywood script writer would dare to turn in to his boss. A New York Times writer called the Great Lakes Naval Station victory over undefeated, 9-0 Notre Dame, the biggest upset of this or any recent football season. An audience of 23,000, composed primarily of sailors and naval officers, watched from wooden stands in close proximity to Lake Michigan.

== Pittsburgh Steelers (1946–1947) ==
He played with the Pearl Harbor All-Stars in 1944–1945. Lach signed to play with the New York Yankees (AAFC) on January 21, 1946.

In the fall of 1946 Lach was a back (sports) with the Pittsburgh Steelers after he was traded from the Cardinals. In October against the Boston Yanks he scored two touchdowns during a 16-7 Steelers' triumph. Lach scored from five yards out on the fifth play following Charley Seabright's interception of a Sammy Baugh pass, on November 3. Pittsburgh defeated the Washington Redskins 14-7 before a record-setting home crowd of 39,060.

Lach, playing fullback, caught a 15-yard pass from Johnny Clement in a game with the Redskins at Griffith Stadium, in October 1947. The lead seesawed back and forth eight times before the Redskins won 27–26. At Fenway Park on October 12 the Steelers gained 276 yards employing the single wing of Jock Sutherland, occasionally switching to a double wing set-up. Lach scored from six inches out following a 40-yard run by Bob Cifers, which set up the first touchdown. Pittsburgh defeated Boston 30–14 in front of 18,894 spectators.

Lach's nine touchdowns in 1947 set a Steelers' club record. He was Pittsburgh's second leading ground gainer with 372 yards in 129 carries. Lach tied for 9th in the National Football League in points scored, with 54.

Lach was one of eight members of the 1947 Pittsburgh Steelers team chosen as a pallbearer for the funeral of Coach Dr. John B. (Jock) Sutherland on April 13, 1948. Sutherland died following a brain operation in West Penn Hospital.

Lach was released without explanation by new Steelers' coach, John Michclosen, on September 21, 1948. The Pittsburgh fullback job was awarded to Jerry Shipkey, who played collegiate football at U.C.L.A.
