= List of Duquesne Dukes in the NFL draft =

Mallika

This is a list of Duquesne Dukes football players in the NFL draft.

== Key ==
B	Back	K	Kicker	NT	Nose tackle
C	Center	LB	Linebacker	FB	Fullback
DB	Defensive back	P	Punter	HB	Halfback
DE	Defensive end	QB	Quarterback	WR	Wide receiver
DT	Defensive tackle	RB	Running back	G	Guard
E	End	T	Offensive tackle	TE	Tight end

= Pro Bowler
= Hall of Famer

== Selections ==
Year	Round	Pick	Player	Team	Position
1937	1	5	Mike Basrak	Pittsburgh Pirates	C
1938	1	3	Boyd Brumbaugh	Brooklyn Dodgers	B
1938	6	44	George Platukis	Pittsburgh Pirates	E
1938	10	81	Joseph T. Maras	Cleveland Rams	C
1940	8	62	Carl Nery	Pittsburgh Steelers	G
1942	11	96	Al DeMao	Washington Redskins	C
1942	12	106	Phil Ahwesh	Washington Redskins	B
1942	18	161	John Rokisky	Pittsburgh Steelers	E
1943	7	54	John Matisi	Brooklyn Dodgers	T
1943	11	97	Al Wukits	Pittsburgh Steelers	C
1943	16	147	Max Kielbasa	Pittsburgh Steelers	B
1943	25	237	Joe Cibulas	Pittsburgh Steelers	T
1943	26	249	Ben Keller	Chicago Bears	G
1943	28	268	Joe Goode	Pittsburgh Steelers	B
1944	10	91	Val Jansante	Pittsburgh Steelers	E
1944	16	157	Joe Gottlieb	Pittsburgh Steelers	B
1944	28	295	Ray Donelli	Cleveland Rams	B
1945	5	33	Charley Mehelich	Pittsburgh Steelers	E
1945	7	56	Mike Wolak	Pittsburgh Steelers	B
1945	12	112	Frank Basilone	Pittsburgh Steelers	B
1945	14	132	Mel Odelli	Pittsburgh Steelers	B
1951	14	167	Charley Rapp	New York Yanks	B
1951	19	227	Ralph Longmore	New York Yanks	B
