= Pat McHugh =

American football player (1919–2004)

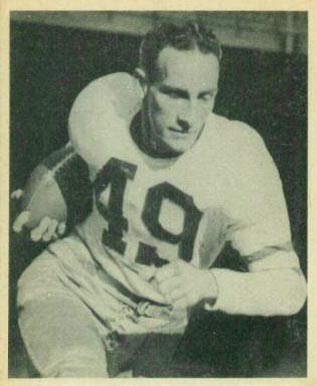

No. 49
- Positions: Defensive back, halfback

Personal information
- Born: December 21, 1919; Selma, Alabama, U.S.
- Died: September 19, 2004 (aged 84); Chattanooga, Tennessee, U.S.
- Listed height: 5 ft 11 in (1.80 m)
- Listed weight: 166 lb (75 kg)

Career information
- High school: Keith (Orrville, Alabama); Notre Dame (Chattanooga)
- College: Georgia Tech (1940-1942, 1946)
- NFL draft: 1946: 12th round, 108th overall pick

Career history
- Philadelphia Eagles (1947–1951)

Awards and highlights
- 2× NFL champion (1948, 1949)

Career NFL statistics
- Rushing yards: 202
- Rushing average: 6.3
- Receptions: 2
- Receiving yards: 16
- Total touchdowns: 3
- Interceptions: 16
- Stats at Pro Football Reference

William Patrick McHugh (December 21, 1919 – September 19, 2004) was a professional American football defensive back and halfback in the National Football League (NFL). He played five seasons for the Philadelphia Eagles (1947–1951).
