= Cregar =

Cregar is a surname. Notable people with the surname include:

- Bill Cregar (1925–2019), American football player and FBI agent
- Laird Cregar (1913–1944), American actor
