= Val Jansante =

American football player (1920–2008)

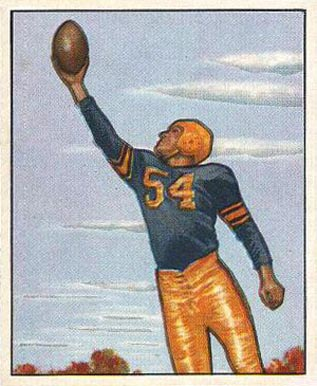
- Jansante on a 1950 Bowman football card

No. 54, 85, 23
- Positions: End, defensive end

Personal information
- Born: September 27, 1920; La Belle, Pennsylvania, U.S.
- Died: October 1, 2008 (aged 88); Monongahela, Pennsylvania, U.S.
- Listed height: 6 ft 1 in (1.85 m)
- Listed weight: 190 lb (86 kg)

Career information
- College: Duquesne; Villanova
- NFL draft: 1944: 10th round, 91st overall pick

Career history
- Pittsburgh Steelers (1946–1951); Green Bay Packers (1951)

Career NFL statistics
- Receptions: 155
- Receiving yards: 2,356
- Touchdowns: 14
- Stats at Pro Football Reference

Valerio Richard Jansante (September 27, 1920 – October 1, 2008) was an American professional football player who played wide receiver for six seasons for the Pittsburgh Steelers and the Green Bay Packers.

== Career ==
=== High school ===
Born in La Belle, Pennsylvania, Jansante first played his first game of football, in his senior year in high school in 1939, under Alex Ufema at Bentleyville High School in Bentleyville, Pennsylvania . He played running back and end and racked up 9 touchdowns. Three TDs were against Ellsworth High all for more than 40 yards per score. Jansante also was a star basketball player and was awarded the prestigious top athlete award of the area known as the Mid-Mon Valley Award due to his success in both sports.

=== College ===
In college, Jansante was one of Buff Donelli’s star pupils at Duquesne University. He played on the team during its 26 game winning streak. Duquesne was undefeated in 1941. At that time, Duquesne University played big time Division I football. Because of World War II, Jansante went into the Navy in 1943 and was discharged in 1945 and joined the Steelers. During part of his service time Jansante spent a semester as a student at Harvard University in Massachusetts.

In 1943, Jansante was a student and varsity football player at Villanova University. Perhaps his biggest game of his career, the game that changed his future, was when Villanova was scrimmaging the “Steagles” (combined Steelers and Philadelphia Eagles due to World War II) and Jansante sacked the quarterback five times and caught seven receptions. Bert Bell, from the Steelers’ front office, immediately put Jansante on the NFL draft list.

Then, he played for the Naval Base Fleet City team stationed out of Oakland, California. The Fleet City team played against professional teams that were still in existence during the war. Jansante's first 6 pass receptions were for touchdowns in 1945, and the unbeaten Fleet City football team won the championship.

=== NFL ===
Jansante was a tenth round draft pick in 1944 but because of his service in World War II, did not join the team until 1946. Immediately Jansante led the team in receptions, but he needed only 10 to earn that distinction in 1946. A year later, in 1947, he set club records with 35 catches for 599 yards and 5 touchdowns, leading the Eastern Division in receiving until the last game of the season. That was the first year the Steelers went to a postseason game, with an 8–4 record. It would be their only postseason competition until Franco Harris' “Immaculate Reception” of 1972. Jansante broke his mark in 1948 with 39 receptions for 623 yards. In addition, he led the Steelers in pass receptions in 1949 and 1950. Also in 1950, Jansante led the entire NFL with 8.5 quarterback sacks from the defensive end position.

Jansante was a two-way starter for the Pittsburgh Steelers from the first day he stepped onto the field in 1946. He played six seasons with the Steelers in which he was named First Team and Second Team All-Pro. With 154 receptions in six seasons, Jansante held the reception record for a while and was among the top 10 pass catchers for a number of years for the Steelers. There were two games in which he caught 10 passes. The first was in 1949 in a game against Philadelphia; the quarterback attempted a total of 10 passes and Jansante caught all ten. The second game with 10 receptions was against Los Angeles in 1950. In the 75 year Steelers’ history, Val is eighth on the all-time list for most receptions in a single game.

In 1951, while leading the club with 15 receptions in mid-season, following the 6th game, he left the Steelers to join the Green Bay Packers as a running back. He played 3 games for the Packers, and was listed by the team as an end.

Jansante played for conservative coaches Dr. Jock Sutherland and John Michelosen. It was both coaches’ style not to throw the football. He was the first of the Steelers to catch double-digit (10) passes in a single game, so it is a surprise that even 10 passes were thrown in Jansante's big days.

== NFL career statistics ==
Legend
**Bold**	Career high

=== Regular season ===
Year	Team	Games		Receiving				
Year	Team	GP	GS	Rec	Yds	Avg	Lng	TD
1946	PIT	11	7	10	136	13.6	34	1
1947	PIT	12	8	35	599	**17.1**	46	**5**
1948	PIT	12	5	**39**	**623**	16.0	**66**	3
1949	PIT	12	10	29	445	15.3	47	4
1950	PIT	12	11	26	353	13.6	40	0
1951	PIT	6	6	15	194	12.9	46	1
1951	GNB	3	0	1	6	6.0	6	0
		68	47	155	2,356	15.2	66	14

== Retirement ==
After retiring from football, Jansante was a teacher and head football coach at Central Catholic High School in Pittsburgh, Mon Valley Catholic High School in Monongahela, and Bentworth High School in Bentleyville. He coached both boys and girls athletics in the WPIAL (Western Pennsylvania Interscholastic Athletic League, District 7) for more than 25 years. Jansante resided in Bentleyville, Pennsylvania until his death.

== Legacy ==
In 1983 when the Steelers celebrated their 50th year in the NFL, Jansante was on the ballot of all-time greatest Steelers. Art Rooney noted, "There wasn’t any better than Jansante.". Jansante is also listed as one of the all-time greatest Steelers in the 1998 book, “The Official Encyclopedia of the Pittsburgh Steelers.” In 1999, he had the distinction of being listed as one of only six receivers to be considered on the ballot for the Pittsburgh Steelers All-Century Team. In 2001, he was honored during the opening of Heinz Field among twelve members of the 1947 first playoff team. Again in 2007, he was an honorary team captain representing the 1940s decade for the coin toss when the Steelers played the San Francisco 49ers.

He has been honored by being placed in the Duquesne University Sports Hall of Fame, the Pennsylvania Sports Hall of Fame, the Italian-American Sports Hall of Fame, and in 2000 he was inducted into the Mid Mon Valley Sports Hall of Fame alongside Joe Montana.

Until Hines Ward in 2006, Jansante was the only Steeler ever to lead the team in receiving for five consecutive seasons. In the single-wing formation, Jansante was considered the best pass-catcher in Steelers history and often compared to Pro Football Hall of Famer Don Hutson of the Green Bay Packers.
