= John Michelosen =

American football player and coach (1916–1982)

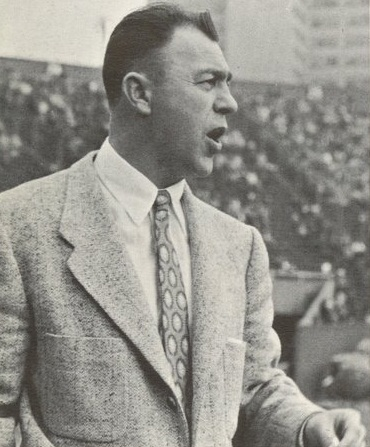
- Michelosen from 1956 Owl

Profile
- Position: Quarterback

Personal information
- Born: February 13, 1916; Ambridge, Pennsylvania, U.S.
- Died: October 17, 1982 (aged 66); San Diego, California, U.S.

Career information
- High school: Ambridge
- College: Pittsburgh (1934-1937)
- NFL draft: 1938: 12th round, 102nd overall pick

Career history
- Pittsburgh (1938–1939) Assistant coach; Brooklyn Dodgers (1940–1941) Backfield coach; Corpus Christi NAS (1945) Assistant coach; Pittsburgh Steelers (1946–1947) Assistant coach; Pittsburgh Steelers (1948–1951) Head coach; Pittsburgh (1955–1965) Head coach

Awards and highlights
- 2× national champion (1936, 1937); Pennsylvania Sports Hall of Fame

Head coaching record
- Regular season: 20–26–1 (.436)
- Career: NFL: 20–26–1 (.436); College: 56–49–7 (.531)
- Coaching profile at Pro Football Reference
- Stats at Pro Football Reference

John Pollock Michelosen (February 13, 1916 – October 17, 1982) was an American football player and coach. He served as the head coach for the Pittsburgh Steelers of the National Football League (NFL) from 1948 to 1951, compiling a record of 20–26–2. From 1955 to 1965 he was the head football coach at his alma mater, the University of Pittsburgh, tallying a mark of 56–49–7.

== Early life ==
Michelosen was a native of the Pittsburgh suburb of Ambridge, Pennsylvania. Michelosen got his start in football playing quarterback at Ambridge High School, under coach Maurice "Moe" Rubenstein. He attended the University of Pittsburgh where he played for Jock Sutherland. He started for three years, playing on Pittsburgh's national championship teams in 1936 and 1937. He was a team captain in 1937. He was also a member of Kappa Sigma fraternity. He was drafted in the 12th round of the 1938 NFL Draft. After his college career, Sutherland and Michelosen continued their relationship as coach and player with the (football) Brooklyn Dodgers and the Pittsburgh Steelers until Sutherland's death in 1948. Michelosen was the backfield coach on the 1946 and 1947 Pittsburgh Steelers coaching staff.

== World War II ==
Michelosen served as a naval flight instructor for three years in World War II.

== Coaching career ==
After graduating, Michelosen joined Pitt's staff as an assistant football coach.

=== Pittsburgh Steelers ===
In 1948, Michelosen became the youngest head coach of any National Football League (NFL) team in the league's "modern era" (loosely defined as since 1946) when he took command of the Steelers. At the age of 32 years and two months, he remained the youngest head coach in NFL history until 1962 when Harland Svare beat him out by four months in mid-season. Michelosen held on to the distinction of being the youngest coach ever to start an NFL season until the Oakland Raiders hired Lane Kiffin in 2007.

Under Michelosen's leadership, the Steelers continued to run the Sutherland style Single Wing Offense. They were the last NFL team to discontinue the scheme as a primary offense.

Michelosen's tenure as Steelers head coach lasted until 1951 and he compiled a 20–26–2 record. In 1949 Michelosen guided the Steelers to a second-place finish in the NFL's Eastern Division. At the time only division champions qualified for post-season play.

=== Pittsburgh Panthers ===
Michelosen returned to the University of Pittsburgh in 1955 and served as head football coach for 11 seasons, through the 1965 campaign. He led Pitt to back-to-back major bowl games in the 1950s. His 1963 team finished the season with a 9–1 record and ranked #3 and #4 in the major polls, but was not invited to a bowl game, perhaps due to the postponement of a game against Penn State following the assassination of John F. Kennedy. Michelosen put together a 56–49–7 record over 11 seasons, with only four losing campaigns. Pitt was ranked as high as #3 in the nation during the height of his coaching career and was ranked among the top ten programs six seasons and the top 25 for seven seasons with Michelosen at the helm.

== Legacy and honors ==
Michelosen was an influence on NFL greats such as Mike Ditka and Marty Schottenheimer, both of whom were born and raised near Pittsburgh and played for Pitt in the 1950s. Michelosen also has a place in the civil rights history of the country, guiding the first team to break the color barrier in the southern bowls. In the 1956 Sugar Bowl, Pittsburgh became the first sports team ever to field an African American player in the deep south.

Michelosen was inducted into the Pennsylvania Sports Hall of Fame in 1970.

== Death ==
Michelosen died on October 17, 1982, in San Diego, California following a heart attack.

== Head coaching record ==
=== College ===
Year	Team	Overall	Bowl/playoffs	Coaches^{#}	AP^{°}
Pittsburgh Panthers (NCAA University Division independent) (1955–1965)
1955	Pittsburgh	7–4	L Sugar	11	11
1956	Pittsburgh	7–3–1	L Gator	12	13
1957	Pittsburgh	4–6			
1958	Pittsburgh	5–4–1			
1959	Pittsburgh	6–4		19	20
1960	Pittsburgh	4–3–3			
1961	Pittsburgh	3–7			
1962	Pittsburgh	5–5			
1963	Pittsburgh	9–1		3	4
1964	Pittsburgh	3–5–2			
1965	Pittsburgh	3–7			
Pittsburgh:		56–49–7			
Total:		56–49–7			
^{#}Rankings from final Coaches Poll.; ^{°}Rankings from final AP Poll.

=== NFL ===
Team	Year	Regular season							Post season			
Team	Year	Won	Lost	Ties	Win %	Finish	Conference	Division	Won	Lost	Win %	Result
PIT	1948	4	8	0	.500	T-3rd		Eastern	-	-	-	-
PIT	1949	6	5	1	.542	2nd		Eastern	-	-	-	-
PIT	1950	6	6	0	.500	T-3rd	American		-	-	-	-
PIT	1951	4	7	1	.375	4th	American		-	-	-	-
PIT Total		20	26	2	.435				0	0	.000	-
