= Tommy Thompson (quarterback) =

American football player and coach (1918–1989)

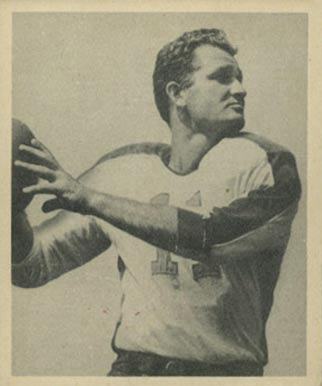
- Thompson on a 1948 Bowman football card

No. 3, 10, 11, 85
- Position: Quarterback

Personal information
- Born: August 15, 1916; Hutchinson, Kansas, U.S.
- Died: April 21, 1989 (aged 72); Calico Rock, Arkansas, U.S.
- Listed height: 6 ft 1 in (1.85 m)
- Listed weight: 192 lb (87 kg)

Career information
- High school: Paschal (Fort Worth, Texas)
- College: Tulsa
- NFL draft: 1940: undrafted

Career history

Playing
- Pittsburgh Steelers (1940); Philadelphia Eagles (1941–1942, 1945–1950); Winnipeg Blue Bombers (1953)

Coaching
- Winnipeg Blue Bombers (1953) Backfield coach; Chicago Cardinals (1955) Backfield coach; Calgary Stampeders (1956–1958) Assistant coach

Awards and highlights
- 2× NFL champion (1948, 1949); Second-team All-Pro (1948); Pro Bowl (1942); NFL passing touchdowns leader (1948); 2× NFL passer rating leader (1948, 1949)

Career NFL statistics
- Passing attempts: 1,424
- Passing completions: 732
- Completion percentage: 51.4%
- TD–INT: 91–103
- Passing yards: 10,385
- Passer rating: 66.5
- Stats at Pro Football Reference

Thomas Pryor Thompson (August 15, 1916 – April 22, 1989) was an American professional football player who was a quarterback in the National Football League (NFL) and Canadian Football League (CFL). He played college football for the Tulsa Golden Hurricane.

== Early life and education ==
Born in Hutchinson, Kansas, Thompson graduated from R. L. Paschal High School in Fort Worth, Texas, and played college football at the University of Tulsa. He was blind in one eye, from a childhood incident, but nevertheless served in the U.S. Army for two years during World War II, which put his professional career on hold.

== Professional career ==
While stats for Thompson's career in terms of wins and losses were not officially measured until his last year in 1950, he is reported to have made 46 starts with 99 total game appearances.

After a forgettable season to start his career in 1940 with Pittsburgh, he ended up playing with in-state rival Philadelphia. The first two seasons spent with Philadelphia were miserable, as the Eagles won two games each, while he was an off-and-on starter. Upon his return to the Eagles in 1945, the fortunes of the team had improved, as they won at least six games and finished at least third in each year, buoyed by Thompson and Steve Van Buren (starting play with the team in 1944), who would eventually be named to the Pro Football Hall of Fame.

In the three-year run for the Eagles to three straight NFL championship appearances from 1947 to 1949, Thompson would throw for 57 total touchdowns while Van Buren would run for 34 touchdowns.

In 1948 and 1949, he would lead the league in passer rating, and his 25 touchdowns in the former year was a league high: he was just the second quarterback to lead the league in consecutive years in the category (after Ed Danowski) and just the fourth to lead the league multiple times (after Danowski, Sid Luckman, and Sammy Baugh). In 1947, the Eagles won eight of twelve games and wound up tied with Pittsburgh in the division, meaning a tiebreaker game was required to determine who would play in the NFL Championship Game

Thompson was the starting quarterback for the Eagles in the game, and went 11-of-17 for 131 yards and two touchdowns. His 15-yard score to Steve Van Buren in the first quarter proved to be the winning score, as the Eagles went on to shut out the Steelers 21–0. For the 1947 NFL Championship Game, there was no primary starter at quarterback on either team, although Thompson did play. Facing the Chicago Cardinals, he threw 27-of-44 passes for 297 yards for one touchdown and three interceptions. The game was mostly even-matched in passing and rushing, but the Cardinals started with a 14–0 lead by the time the Eagles ended up getting on the board, and after that they traded scores as the Cardinals held on to win 28–21, after having possession for the last five minutes.

The following year, he helped lead the Eagles to another division crown. On December 19, in the 1948 NFL Championship Game, he would partake in one of the most famous weather games, as snow rained down on Shibe Park that made running an even more important commodity: each team combined for over 300 yards on the ground to just 42 passing. Facing the Cardinals once again, he went 2-of-12 for 7 yards and two interceptions while running for 50 yards on 11 carries. However, Steve Van Buren would win the game on a touchdown run early in the fourth quarter to give the Eagles the one and only score needed to win Philadelphia's first championship, with Thompson and Van Buren each getting credit from coach Greasy Neale for the win.

In 1949, the Eagles were even better, losing just one game as Thompson and the team would make it to a third consecutive NFL Championship Game. Facing the upstart Los Angeles Rams on a mudpit, he threw for 5-of-9 for 68 yards with one touchdown and one interception. His 31-yard touchdown to Pete Pihos in the second quarter was both the longest pass he threw all day and the winning score as the Eagles shut out the Rams 14–0.

Thompson closed his career in 1950 with a 6–6 record, having thrown for 1,608 yards with 11 touchdowns to 22 interceptions.

One highlight included him becoming the fourth quarterback to ever throw for 10,000 yards in a career: for context, he finished fourth in passing yards all-time, behind Sammy Baugh, Sid Luckman and Otto Graham, all of whom were later inducted into the Hall of Fame. In the seven decades that have followed since Thompson retired, he fell from 4th to 193rd, a reflection of the growing trend in passing.

Thompson is one of four eligible inactive NFL quarterbacks with multiple championships who have not yet been inducted into the Pro Football Hall of Fame, along with Jim Plunkett, Tobin Rote, and Jack Kemp. Ray Didinger of The Philadelphia Inquirer called him a "clever ballhandler" who had the ideal hands that would be part of what a dream signal-caller for an Eagles quarterback.

In 1953, Thompson made a brief return to football by playing with the Winnipeg Blue Bombers while serving as their backfield coach. He only played three games with them.

=== Coaching career ===
Thompson served as an assistant coach on three different teams from 1953 to 1957, serving as backfield coach for the Winnipeg Blue Bombers in 1953 and for the Chicago Cardinals in 1955. He moved to assistant coaching with the Calgary Stampeders for the 1956–58 seasons.

== Later life and death ==
Thompson battled brain cancer for over a year and died in 1989 in Calico Rock, Arkansas.

In 2012, Thompson was inducted into the Philadelphia Sports Hall of Fame.

== Career statistics ==
Legend
	Won the NFL championship
	Led the league
**Bold**	Career high

General					Passing										Rushing					
Year	Team	GP	GS	W–L	Comp	Att	Pct	Yds	Y/A	Y/G	TD	Int	Rate	Sck	Att	Yds	Y/A	Y/G	TD	Fum
1940	PIT	11	2	— (Note: This stat was not available for the respective season, according to Pro-Football-Reference)	9	28	32.1	145	5.2	13.2	1	3	22.8	—	40	39	1.0	3.5	0	0
1941	PHI	11	5	—	86	162	53.1	959	5.9	87.2	8	14	51.4	—	54	−2	0.0	−0.2	0	0
1942	PHI	11	10	—	95	203	46.8	1,410	6.9	128.2	8	16	50.3	—	92	−32	−0.3	−2.9	1	2
1945	PHI	8	—	—	15	28	53.6	146	5.2	18.3	0	2	38.7	—	8	−13	−1.6	−1.6	0	3
1946	PHI	10	3	—	57	103	55.3	745	7.2	74.5	6	9	61.3	—	34	−116	−3.4	−11.6	0	8
1947	PHI	12	1	—	106	201	52.7	1,680	8.4	140.0	16	15	76.3	—	23	52	2.3	4.3	2	6
1948	PHI	12	4	—	141	246	57.3	1,965	8.0	163.8	25	11	98.4	—	12	46	3.8	3.8	1	0
1949	PHI	12	9	—	116	214	54.2	1,727	8.1	143.9	16	11	84.4	—	15	17	1.1	1.4	2	4
1950	PHI	12	12	6−6	107	239	44.8	1,608	6.7	134.0	11	22	44.4	—	15	34	2.3	2.8	0	3
Career		99	46	6−6	732	1,424	51.4	10,385	7.3	104.9	91	103	66.5	—	293	25	0.1	0.3	6	24
