= Bentworth School District =

School district in Pennsylvania, USA

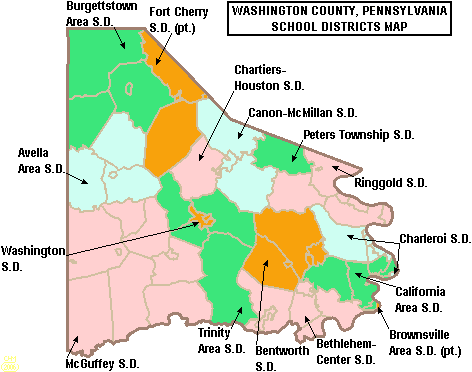
- Map of Washington County Pennsylvania School Districts

Address
- 150 Bearcat Drive Bentleyville, Washington County, Pennsylvania, 15314-1422; United States

District information
- Type: Public
- Motto: Where children come first and their futures follow
- Grades: K-12

Students and staff
- District mascot: Bearcats
- Colors: Black and gold

Other information
- Website: www.bentworth.org

The Bentworth School District is a small, rural public school district located in southwestern Pennsylvania. Bentworth School District encompasses approximately 54 square miles (140 km^{2}). It covers the boroughs of Bentleyville, Cokeburg, and Ellsworth as well as North Bethlehem Township and Somerset Township in Washington County, Pennsylvania.

== Schools ==
The school system's name is a combination of the former public schools operated in Bentleyville (Bears) and Ellsworth (Tigers). The school's mascot, the Bearcat, is also a combination of those belonging to former schools.

=== Historic schools ===
- Bentleyville Elementary School (Washington Street School, Bentleyville High School)
- Somerset Elementary School
- Scenery Hill School (presently North Bethlehem Twp. Community Center)
- Nicholl School
- Ellsworth Schools

=== Current schools ===
The system currently operates three schools:

- Bentworth Elementary Center serves students K-4th grade with a student-teacher ratio of 14:1.
- Bentworth Middle School serves students 5th–8th grade with a student-teacher ratio of 14:1.
- Bentworth High School

The elementary and high schools are located in Bentleyville Borough while the middle school is located nearby in Somerset Township. Additionally, the District maintains an athletic field in Ellsworth.

== Extracurriculars ==
Bentworth School District offers a variety of clubs, activities and interscholastic athletics

=== Sports ===
The Bentworth School District funds:

Boys

- Baseball – AA
- Basketball- AA
- Football – AA
- Golf – AA
- Soccer – A
- Track and Field – AA
- Wrestling – AA

Girls

- Basketball – AA
- Soccer (Fall) – A
- Softball – AA
- Track and Field – AA
- Volleyball – A

Middle School Sports

Boys

- Basketball
- Football
- Soccer
- Wrestling

Girls

- Basketball
- Cheerleading
- Softball
- Volleyball

According to PIAA directory July 2013

== Notable alumni ==
=== Bentworth High School ===
- Justine Ezarik (2002), internet personality, known for her YouTube channel, iJustine.

=== Bentleyville High School ===
- Val Jansante, footballer, Pittsburgh Steeler (1946–51)
- Barry Stout (1960); Pennsylvania state senator

=== Ellsworth High School ===
- Donald P. Bellisario (1953); screenwriter and producer
