= Ralph Calcagni =

American football player (1922–1948)

No. 47
- Position: Tackle

Personal information
- Born: February 6, 1922; Smithton, Pennsylvania, U.S.
- Died: August 29, 1948 (aged 26); Meadville, Pennsylvania, U.S.
- Listed height: 6 ft 3 in (1.91 m)
- Listed weight: 230 lb (104 kg)

Career information
- High school: Connellsville (Connellsville, Pennsylvania)
- College: Cornell; Penn
- NFL draft: 1944: 31st round, 324th overall pick

Career history
- Boston Yanks (1946); Pittsburgh Steelers (1947)

Career NFL statistics
- Games played: 20
- Games started: 5
- Fumble recoveries: 1
- Stats at Pro Football Reference

Ralph Calcagni (February 6, 1922 – August 29, 1948) was an American professional football tackle. He was drafted by the Boston Yanks in the 31st round (324th overall) of the 1944 NFL Draft. He played for the Boston Yanks in 1946 and for the Pittsburgh Steelers in 1947.

In college, Calcagni was the captain of the 1943 Penn Quakers football team.

Calcagni died suddenly on August 29, 1948, following an emergency appendectomy.
