= Steve Van Buren =

Honduran-born American football player (1920–2012)

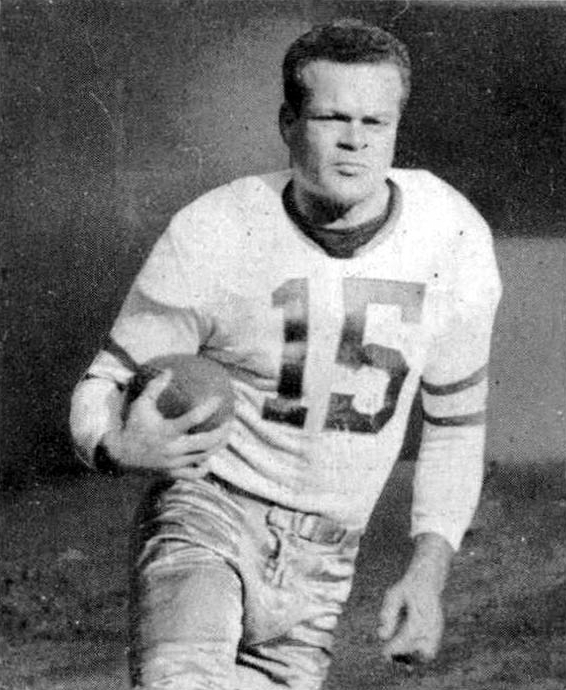
- Van Buren in 1948

No. 15
- Position: Halfback

Personal information
- Born: December 28, 1920; La Ceiba, Honduras
- Died: August 23, 2012 (aged 91); Lancaster, Pennsylvania, U.S.
- Listed height: 6 ft 0 in (1.83 m)
- Listed weight: 200 lb (91 kg)

Career information
- High school: Warren Easton (New Orleans, Louisiana)
- College: LSU (1940–1943)
- NFL draft: 1944: 1st round, 5th overall pick

Career history

Playing
- Philadelphia Eagles (1944–1951)

Coaching
- Philadelphia Eagles (1956) Backfield coach; Newark Bears (1963–1965) Head coach; Philadelphia Bulldogs (1966) Backfield coach; Pottstown Firebirds (1968–1969) Offensive backfield/assistant coach

Awards and highlights
- 2× NFL champion (1948, 1949); 5× First-team All-Pro (1944, 1945, 1947–1949); 2× Second-team All-Pro (1946, 1950); 4× NFL rushing yards leader (1945, 1947–1949); 4× NFL rushing touchdowns leader (1945, 1947–1949); NFL scoring leader (1945); NFL 1940s All-Decade Team; NFL 75th Anniversary All-Time Team; NFL 100th Anniversary All-Time Team; Philadelphia Eagles Hall of Fame; Philadelphia Eagles 75th Anniversary Team; Philadelphia Eagles No. 15 retired; Third-team All-American (1943); First-team All-SEC (1943)

Career NFL statistics
- Rushing yards: 5,860
- Rushing average: 4.4
- Rushing touchdowns: 69
- Receptions: 45
- Receiving yards: 523
- Receiving touchdowns: 3
- Return yards: 2,503
- Return touchdowns: 5
- Stats at Pro Football Reference

Head coaching record
- Career: 28–11–1 (.713)
- Pro Football Hall of Fame

Stephen Wood Van Buren (December 28, 1920 − August 23, 2012) was a Honduran-American professional football halfback who played for the Philadelphia Eagles of the National Football League (NFL) from 1944 to 1951. Regarded as a powerful and punishing runner with excellent speed, he won four NFL rushing titles through eight NFL seasons, including three straight from 1947 to 1949. At a time when teams played 12 games a year, he was the first NFL player to rush for over ten touchdowns in a season—a feat he accomplished three times—and the first to have multiple 1,000-yard rushing seasons. When he retired, he held the NFL career records for rushing attempts, rushing yards, and rushing touchdowns.

Van Buren played college football for the LSU Tigers, where he led the NCAA in scoring in his senior season. After leading LSU to victory in the 1944 Orange Bowl, he was selected by the Eagles with the fifth overall pick of the 1944 NFL draft. Van Buren acquired many nicknames over his career in reference to his running style, including "Wham Bam", "Moving Van" and "Supersonic Steve". He was the driving force for the Eagles in the team's back-to-back NFL championships in 1948 and 1949; he scored the only touchdown of the 1948 NFL Championship Game against the Chicago Cardinals, and in the next year's championship game against the Los Angeles Rams he set postseason records with 31 carries and 196 rushing yards.

After his playing career, Van Buren coached in minor league football, winning an Atlantic Coast Football League (ACFL) championship with the Newark Bears in 1963. He was elected to the Pro Football Hall of Fame in 1965. Van Buren is a member of the NFL 1940s All-Decade Team, the NFL 75th Anniversary All-Time Team and the NFL 100th Anniversary All-Time Team. Considered one of the greatest players in Eagles franchise history, his number 15 jersey is retired by the team, and he is enshrined in the Philadelphia Eagles Hall of Fame and the Philadelphia Sports Hall of Fame. For his college career, he was inducted into the Louisiana State University Athletic Hall of Fame in 1944 and the Louisiana Sports Hall of Fame in 1961.

== Early life ==
Born in La Ceiba, Honduras, to an American father and a mother of Spanish heritage, Stephen Wood Van Buren was orphaned at age ten and was sent to live with relatives in New Orleans, Louisiana. There he attended Warren Easton High School, and tried out for the football team originally as a sophomore, but did not make it. Later that year he dropped out of high school and went to work in an iron foundry. He returned to high school two years later and made the team as an end his senior year. He played well enough that season to earn an athletic scholarship to Louisiana State University (LSU) in Baton Rouge.

== College career ==
Playing for the LSU Tigers football team, Van Buren was used primarily for blocking until his senior season, when head coach Bernie Moore moved him to tailback because of a lack of players due to World War II conscription. Van Buren received a class IV-F exemption due to an eye defect, so he was able to avoid conscription. "He probably was the greatest running back in Southeastern Conference history," Moore recalled, "and I used him as a blocking back until his last year. The folks in Baton Rouge never let me forget that."

He began the 1943 season by scoring four touchdowns in a 34–27 win over Georgia, including the game-winning touchdown with less than two minutes to play. His final college game was the 1944 Orange Bowl against Texas A&M. Despite A&M coach Homer Norton devising a game-plan specifically to stop him, Van Buren was responsible for all of his team's points, as he ran for two touchdowns, threw for one more, and kicked LSU's only successful extra point attempt in the 19–14 victory. He finished the season with 847 yards rushing and 16 touchdowns. He also completed 13 of 36 passing attempts for 160 yards. His 98 points scored (111 including the bowl game) led the nation. After the season, the Associated Press named Van Buren to its All-Southeastern Conference first team.

== Professional career ==
While still enrolled at LSU, Van Buren was drafted into the National Football League by the Philadelphia Eagles with the fifth overall pick of the 1944 NFL draft. A month later, on May 19 he resigned from the university due to an eye infection that had been bothering him since the Orange Bowl game. The Eagles gave Van Buren a $4,000 contract with no signing bonus. But Van Buren, modest to a fault, took three weeks to sign the contract because he did not feel he was good enough to play professionally. He played as a running back and return specialist in the NFL for eight seasons, all of them with the Eagles. He spent the first seven of them under head coach Earle "Greasy" Neale, who dubbed Van Buren "the best halfback in modern times."

=== 1944–1946: Kick return prowess ===
Van Buren played in nine games during his first season with the Eagles, rushing for 444 yards as a running back and recording five interceptions on defense as a defensive back. His first NFL return touchdown came in the third game of the season, on a 55-yard punt return in the second quarter of a 38–0 shutout win against the Boston Yanks. Three games later, he returned a kickoff 97 yards for a touchdown against the New York Giants, which was the longest kickoff return by any player that season. His 15.3 yards per punt return also led the league. Van Buren was named to the Associated Press's All-Pro first team following the season, the only rookie so named for 1944.

In 1945, Van Buren led the NFL in rushing yards for the first time, and also led the league in scoring, yards from scrimmage, and kickoff return yards. He set an Eagles single-season record with 15 rushing touchdowns, a mark that stood until 2011. His 18 total touchdowns broke Don Hutson's league record by one, set three seasons earlier. He again had the longest kickoff return of the season, this time with a 98-yard return touchdown against the Giants. In that game he also rushed for 100 yards and two more touchdowns as he scored all of the Eagles' touchdowns in the 28–21 loss. At least six major publications named him a first-team All-Pro for the season, including the Associated Press and United Press.

By 1946, Van Buren was considered one of the best players in the league. Before the season, he signed a three-year contract to remain with the Eagles, dispelling rumors that he planned to join the rival All-America Football Conference. He returned just five punts in the 1946 season, but ran one of them back 50 yards for a touchdown against the Boston Yanks in the final game of the year. It was the last punt Van Buren returned in his career. He finished the season with 529 rushing yards, third-most behind leader Bill Dudley of the Pittsburgh Steelers and rookie Pat Harder of the Chicago Cardinals. He was named a first-team All-Pro by the New York Daily News and a second-team All-Pro by the United Press.

After the Eagles' loss to the Steelers during the 1946 season, Eagles coach Greasy Neale gave Dudley high praise during a conversation with Steelers coach Jock Sutherland. Sutherland then offered to trade Dudley to the Eagles. In return he wanted Van Buren, but according to Les Biederman of The Pittsburgh Press, "before [Sutherland] finished the second syllable of that name, Neale had fled the table."

=== 1947–1949: Three straight rushing titles ===
Van Buren claimed his second rushing title in 1947, which was the first in a string of three straight. His 1,008 rushing yards broke the single-season record of 1,004 set by Beattie Feathers with the Chicago Bears in 1934. He was no longer returning punts for the team, as the role was taken over by halfback Bosh Pritchard, though he still returned kickoffs. His 95-yard kickoff return touchdown against the Washington Redskins in the first game of the season was again the longest kickoff return by any player that season, as well as the last kick return touchdown of his career.

The Eagles and Pittsburgh Steelers both finished the 1947 regular season atop the Eastern Conference with an 8–4 record, so the two teams met for a tiebreaker game to determine the conference champion. During the week before the game, the Steelers ran workouts concentrating on a means of stopping Van Buren's running. In the game, the Steelers' defensive line held Van Buren to 45 rushing yards and no rushing touchdowns, but he scored the game's first touchdown on a 15-yard reception from quarterback Tommy Thompson. The Eagles won with a 21–0 shutout, setting them up to face the Chicago Cardinals in the NFL Championship Game, the first championship game appearance in franchise history, and it would be on Van Buren's 27th birthday. Against the Cardinals' "Million Dollar Backfield", Van Buren was held in check, as the Eagles were defeated 28–21 in a back-and-forth contest. Van Buren did score a touchdown, though, becoming the first player in NFL history to score a touchdown in a championship game on his birthday. This wouldn't be repeated until Super Bowl LIX over 77 years later, when fellow Eagle Cooper DeJean intercepted Patrick Mahomes, and returned it for a 38-yard touchdown.

The 1948 season was the second straight that Van Buren led the league in carries, rushing yards, rushing touchdowns, and yards from scrimmage. In week 3, in the first quarter against the New York Giants Van Buren scored his 39th career rushing touchdown, surpassing Ernie Nevers as the all-time leader. That game—a 45–0 shutout win—was the first in an eight-game winning streak for the Eagles in which they scored 275 points total and allowed 49. The team finished the regular season with the best record in the Eastern Division and were to meet the Chicago Cardinals again for the league championship.

==== 1948 NFL Championship Game ====
Having posted similar offensive statistics in the regular season, the Eagles and Cardinals were expected to play a tight game. Played in a blizzard at Philadelphia's Shibe Park, the game's only score was a fourth quarter rushing touchdown by Van Buren from five yards out. The 7–0 win gave the Eagles their first league title. Van Buren finished with 98 yards on 26 carries, though he nearly missed the game entirely. Thinking the game would not be played in the blizzard, he remained home until coach Greasy Neale called him and told him the game was still on. He had to catch three trolleys and walk six blocks in order to make the game on time. "I looked out my bedroom window that morning, saw the snow and went back to bed," he later explained. "I was sure the game would be postponed."

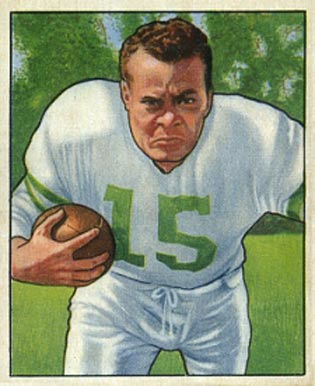
Van Buren depicted on a 1950 Bowman trading card

==== 1949: Career rushing title and second championship ====
By 1949, Van Buren's annual salary was $15,000. Despite the Eagles franchise struggling financially the previous season, Neale was willing to pay him more, but Van Buren declined. "I could have gotten a good deal more," he said. "But you acted a little different when your team lost money." He came into his sixth NFL season needing 104 rushing yards to break Clarke Hinkle's career record of 3,860, which he set after ten seasons with the Packers. Van Buren passed Hinkle's mark against the Detroit Lions in the second game of the season, and by the end of the year had broken his own single-season record as he rushed for 1,146 yards. He became the first running back in NFL history to achieve three consecutive rushing titles. Jim Brown twice, Earl Campbell, and Emmitt Smith have since managed the feat. The Eagles clinched the Eastern Division title in the tenth game of the season with a win over the Steelers. With Pittsburgh's defense designed to stop him, Van Buren ran for 205 yards on 27 carries, setting an Eagles single-game franchise record for rushing yards that stood for over 60 years. The Eagles won their final two games and advanced to their third NFL championship game in as many seasons.

In the 1949 NFL Championship Game at Los Angeles Memorial Coliseum against the Los Angeles Rams, as in the previous season's game, Van Buren carried the Eagles' offense. Although he failed to score, he carried the ball 31 times for a championship game–record 196 yards on the heavily muddied field. The Eagles won 14–0, becoming the first—and as of 2024, the only—team in league history to win consecutive championship games with a shutout. Following the game, Rams coach Clark Shaughnessy called Van Buren one of the greatest ball carriers he had seen in forty years of football. "He is equal to any player I've ever seen," said Shaughnessy. Van Buren was named the outstanding athlete of the year by the Philadelphia Sports Writers Association.

=== 1950–1951: Injuries and retirement ===
Back, leg, and neck injuries began to take a toll on Van Buren in 1950, and his production dropped. He broke his toe in the 1950 off-season and suffered from bone spurs, which caused him to miss the team's four preseason exhibition games and regular season opener. He returned to lead the league in carries for the fourth straight season, but lost the rushing title for the first time in four years and had career-lows in touchdowns and yards per carry. The Eagles finished with a 6–6 regular season record. Greasy Neale was fired by the Eagles the following February and replaced by Bo McMillin. In 1951, Van Buren played alongside his brother, halfback and linebacker Ebert, whom the Eagles selected in that year's draft out of LSU. The elder Van Buren continued to play through injuries, taking several shots of Novocaine before each game. He had a career-low 327 rushing yards for the season, as the Eagles finished with a losing record for the first time since 1942.

During training camp prior to the 1952 season, Van Buren tore a knee ligament and required surgery. He missed the entire season and retired as a player in September 1953, but remained on the Eagles payroll in a public relations capacity. He finished his career having carried 1,320 times for 5,860 yards and 69 touchdowns. He also scored three times returning kickoffs, three times on receptions, and twice on punt returns for a total of 77 touchdowns. On defense, he intercepted nine opponents' passes.

== NFL career statistics ==
Legend
	Won the NFL championship
	Led the league
**Bold**	Career high

Year	Team	GP	Rushing					Receiving					Punt returns					Kickoff returns				
Year	Team	GP	Att	Yds	TD	Lng	Avg	Rec	Yds	Avg	Lng	TD	Ret	Yds	TD	Lng	Avg	Ret	Yds	TD	Lng	Avg
1944	PHI	9	80	444	5	**70**	5.6	0	0	0.0	0	0	**15**	**230**	**1**	**55**	15.3	8	266	**1**	97	**33.3**
1945	PHI	10	143	832	**15**	69	**5.8**	**10**	**123**	12.3	44	**2**	14	154	0	24	11.0	13	373	**1**	**98**	28.7
1946	PHI	9	116	529	5	58	4.6	6	75	12.5	33	0	5	89	**1**	50	**17.8**	11	319	0	63	29.0
1947	PHI	12	217	1,008	13	45	4.6	9	79	8.8	35	0	—	—	—	—	—	13	**382**	**1**	95	29.4
1948	PHI	11	201	945	10	29	4.7	**10**	96	9.6	34	0	—	—	—	—	—	**14**	292	0	34	20.9
1949	PHI	12	**263**	**1,146**	11	41	4.4	4	88	**22.0**	50	1	—	—	—	—	—	12	288	0	35	24.0
1950	PHI	10	188	629	4	41	3.3	2	34	17.0	29	0	—	—	—	—	—	5	110	0	26	22.0
1951	PHI	10	112	327	6	17	2.9	4	28	7.0	18	0	—	—	—	—	—	—	—	—	—	—
Career		83	1,320	5,860	69	70	4.4	45	523	11.6	50	3	34	473	2	55	13.9	76	2,030	3	98	26.7

== Playing style ==
Van Buren's profile at the Pro Football Hall of Fame states he "lined up as a halfback but played more like a fullback." He had a rare combination of strength, speed, and endurance. While not as elusive or nimble as other backs, he preferred to run through tacklers instead of avoid them, and never ran out of bounds if he felt he could pick up extra yards. "There's no trick," he said of his running style. "When I see I'm gonna be tackled I just put my head down and give 'em the shoulder." He was described as a "deadly tackler", hitting as hard on defense as he did when he carried the ball. His disregard for his own body led to many injuries for both himself and opposing players.

He gained the majority of his yards and touchdowns on the ground, as he preferred being a runner rather than a receiver. All but three of his 72 offensive touchdowns were scored by rushing. His 77 total touchdowns in 83 career games were the most for any player who played less than 100 career games before he was passed by Todd Gurley in 2020. Van Buren acquired many nicknames over his career. He was nicknamed "Wham Bam" for his quick and punishing running style. He was also referred to as "Supersonic Steve," "Blockbuster," and "Moving Van."

== Coaching career ==
Van Buren served as a coach for several seasons in minor league football after his playing career. After serving as a scout for the Eagles, he coached a minor league team in Bristol, Pennsylvania for three years. He then served as head coach for the Franklin Miners of Franklin, New Jersey and led them to a 27–5 win–loss record through 1958 and 1959. The Miners moved to Paterson, New Jersey and joined the Atlantic Coast Football League (ACFL), winning the league's championship in 1962. Van Buren then became head coach for the Newark Bears of the ACFL, which he led to a league championship in 1963. In 1965, the Bears franchise joined the Continental Football League, and in 1966 moved to Orlando, Florida and was renamed the Panthers. Van Buren was elevated to vice president and director of player personnel for the Panthers in 1966. He led the newly formed Hudson Valley Vikings of the North Atlantic Football League as head coach in 1967. In 1968, Van Buren became the offensive backfield coach for the Pottstown Firebirds of the ACFL. In 1969, he was the coach of the independent, semi-pro Jersey Senators, and in 1970, the Phoenix Steelers.

== Legacy, honors, and later life ==
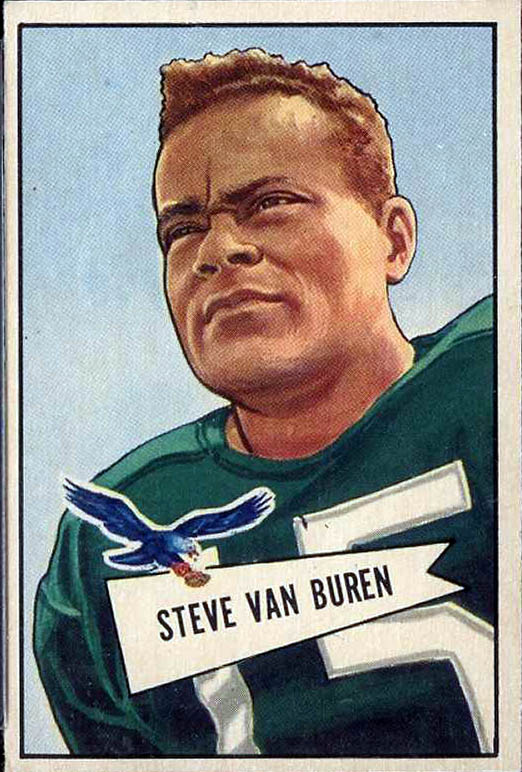
Van Buren depicted in 1952

Van Buren retired as the NFL record holder for career rushing yards and career rushing touchdowns. He was the first player to rush for over 1,000 yards in a season twice, and he held the top two single-season records in rushing yards and rushing touchdowns. He was the first to rush for over ten touchdowns in a season, a feat he accomplished three times before any other player did so once. He was the last Eagles player to win the rushing title until LeSean McCoy led the league in rushing yards in 2013. As of 2019, he remains the Eagles' career leader in rushing touchdowns.

In 1950, Van Buren was selected by the Associated Press for an all-time Southeastern Conference team, which honored the best 11 players in the conference's then 17-year existence. He was inducted into the Louisiana State University Athletic Hall of Fame in 1944 and the Louisiana Sports Hall of Fame in 1961.

He was inducted into the Pro Football Hall of Fame in the class of 1965, which also included Guy Chamberlain, Paddy Driscoll, Dan Fortmann, Otto Graham, Sid Luckman, and Bob Waterfield. He was the first Eagles player to be inducted. Clarke Hinkle presented him with the honor at the induction ceremony. Van Buren's acceptance speech consisted of four sentences:

Thank you Clarke Hinkle, I'm certainly glad to have broken your record. Since you people can't hear too good and I'm not too good a speaker I won't say much, but it's a great honor to be here. The two days I've spent in Canton will certainly bring me back every year from now on. Thank you very much.

Van Buren's jersey number 15 was later retired by the Eagles. He is also a member of the Philadelphia Eagles Hall of Fame and the Philadelphia Sports Hall of Fame. In 2007, he was named to the Eagles 75th Anniversary Team as the starting running back. Van Buren is a member of the NFL 1940s All-Decade Team, which honors the best players from the decade. He was selected to the NFL's 75th and 100th Anniversary All-Time Teams in 1994 and 2019, respectively.

In 2021 The Athletic listed him at 98 of the 100 greatest players ever.

Van Buren lived quietly in Lancaster, Pennsylvania after his football career, where he ran an antique shop with his son-in-law. He also owned a used-car lot with George Ferguson in Delaware County. He also owned a dance hall. His wife, Grace, died in 1978. Van Buren died of pneumonia on August 23, 2012, in Lancaster at the age of 91.

== See also ==
- Foreign players in the National Football League
- List of Philadelphia Eagles first-round draft picks
- List of NCAA major college football yearly scoring leaders
