= Bill Blackburn =

American football player (1923–2007)

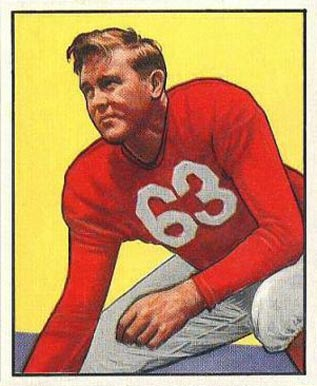
- Blackburn on a 1950 Bowman football card

No. 57
- Position: Center

Personal information
- Born: February 5, 1923; Weleetka, Oklahoma, U.S.
- Died: April 17, 2007 (aged 84); Richmond, Texas, U.S.
- Listed height: 6 ft 6 in (1.98 m)
- Listed weight: 228 lb (103 kg)

Career information
- High school: Houston (TX) Stephen F. Austin
- College: Louisiana (1939-1940); Rice (1941-1942)
- NFL draft: 1944: 5th round, 33rd overall pick

Career history
- Chicago Cardinals (1945–1950); Calgary Stampeders (1951-1952)

Awards and highlights
- NFL champion (1947)

Career NFL statistics
- Games played: 59
- Games started: 25
- Fumble recoveries: 11
- Touchdowns: 4
- Stats at Pro Football Reference

William Whitford Blackburn Jr. (February 5, 1923 – April 17, 2007) was an American professional football player who was a center for six seasons for the Chicago Cardinals.

Alvin Dark was a halfback and teammate of Blackburn with the Southwestern Louisiana Institute in 1944. He recalled that "the joy for me was running behind Humble and Blackburn. I'd never seen such blocking."
