= Frank Hubbell =

American football player (1922–2005)

No. 46
- Position: End / Defensive end

Personal information
- Born: January 19, 1922; Bridgeport, Connecticut, U.S.
- Died: April 9, 2005 (aged 83); Knoxville, Tennessee, U.S.
- Listed height: 6 ft 2 in (1.88 m)
- Listed weight: 222 lb (101 kg)

Career information
- High school: Central (Bridgeport, CT)
- College: Tennessee
- NFL draft: 1944: 15th round, 152nd overall pick

Career history
- Los Angeles Rams (1947–1949)

Career NFL statistics
- Receptions: 15
- Receiving yards: 226
- Receiving touchdowns: 3
- Games played: 36
- Stats at Pro Football Reference

Franklin Sumner Hubbell (January 19, 1922 – April 9, 2005) was an American professional football player for the Los Angeles Rams of the National Football League (NFL). He was drafted in the 15th round of the 1944 NFL draft, 152 overall by the Cleveland Rams.

== College career ==
Hubbell played for the University of Tennessee in college. He graduated with a degree in business administration.

== Career statistics ==
Year	Team	GP	Rec	Yds	Avg	TD
1947	Los Angeles Rams	12	3	32	10.7	0
1948	Los Angeles Rams	12	6	82	13.7	2
1949	Los Angeles Rams	12	6	112	18.7	1
Career		36	15	226	15.1	3
