= Bob Sullivan (American football, born 1924) =

American football player (1924–1992)

No. 27, 91
- Position: Halfback

Personal information
- Born: December 24, 1924; Attleboro, Massachusetts, U.S.
- Died: November 14, 1992 (aged 67); Citrus Heights, California, U.S.
- Listed height: 5 ft 9 in (1.75 m)
- Listed weight: 191 lb (87 kg)

Career information
- High school: Cathedral (Springfield, Massachusetts)
- College: Iowa
- NFL draft: 1947: 13th round, 107th overall pick

Career history
- Pittsburgh Steelers (1947); Chicago Rockets (1948)*; Brooklyn Dodgers (1948)
- * Offseason or practice squad member only
- Stats at Pro Football Reference

Robert Gerard Sullivan (December 24, 1924 – November 14, 1992) was an American professional football halfback who played for the Pittsburgh Steelers of the National Football League (NFL) and the Brooklyn Dodgers of the All-America Football Conference (AAFC). He played college football for the Iowa Hawkeyes and was selected by the Boston Yanks in the 13th round of the 1947 NFL draft.

== Early life ==
Robert Gerard Sullivan was born on December 24, 1924, in Attleboro, Massachusetts. He attended Cathedral High School in Springfield, Massachusetts.

== College career ==
Sullivan played college football for the Holy Cross Crusaders, Iowa Pre-Flight Seahawks, Great Lakes Navy Bluejackets, and Iowa Hawkeyes. He earned a varsity letter for the Hawkeyes in 1946. He led the team in scoring that season with 25 points (two touchdowns, one field goal, and ten extra points). Around this time, Holy Cross had another Bob Sullivan, who also ended up playing in the AAFC in 1948. The two were not related.

== Professional career ==
Sullivan was selected by the Boston Yanks in the 13th round, with the 107th overall pick, of the 1947 NFL draft and by the Los Angeles Dons in the 17th round, with the 131st overall pick, of the 1947 AAFC draft. He ended up playing the 1947 season with the Pittsburgh Steelers. He appeared in the first three games of the season for the Steelers, starting once. He totaled 21 carries for 61 yards, four receptions for 72 yards and one touchdown, and three completions on nine passing attempts for 52 yards and one interception. In mid-October he was hospitalized after hurting his back during practice, a reoccurrence of a 1946 back injury. He played in one more game for the Steelers that year, on November 2, but did not record any statistics.

Sullivan signed with the Chicago Rockets of the AAFC in 1948. On August 31, it was reported that his contract had been purchased by the AAFC's Brooklyn Dodgers. He played in two games for the Dodgers in a reserve role, recording two rushes for negative one yard and one kick return for 22 yards, before being released on September 22, 1948.

== Personal life ==
Sullivan worked at Southern California Edison for 29 years before retiring. He died at his home in Citrus Heights, California, on November 14, 1992.
