= Jack Ferrante =

American football player (1916–2006)

No. 14, 47, 37, 11, 83, 87
- Position: End

Personal information
- Born: March 9, 1916; Camden, New Jersey, U.S.
- Died: November 23, 2006 (aged 90); Yardley, Pennsylvania, U.S.
- Listed height: 6 ft 1 in (1.85 m)
- Listed weight: 197 lb (89 kg)

Career information
- NFL draft: 1939: undrafted

Career history
- Wilmington Clippers (1939-1940); Philadelphia Eagles (1941); Wilmington Clippers (1941-1942); Philadelphia Eagles (1944–1950)

Awards and highlights
- 2× NFL champion (1948, 1949); NFL 1940s All-Decade Team

Career NFL statistics
- Receptions: 169
- Receiving yards: 2,884
- Receiving touchdowns: 31
- Stats at Pro Football Reference

Jack Anthony "Blackjack" Ferrante (March 9, 1916 – November 23, 2006) was an American professional football end in the National Football League (NFL) who played for the Philadelphia Eagles in 1941 and from 1944 to 1950.

== Early life ==
Born in Camden, New Jersey, Ferrante's family moved to South Philadelphia when he was six, and later to West Philadelphia; he dropped out of high school in his sophomore year and began working in local supermarkets. He began playing pro football in local leagues in 1934, initially getting $7 per game.

== Pro career ==
He gained a tryout with the Eagles in 1939, and was signed by their farm team, the Wilmington Clippers. After another tryout, Ferrante played three games for the Eagles in 1941, but was sent back to Wilmington until making the Philadelphia roster for good in 1944. He was a member of the Eagles' championship teams in 1948 and 1949. Ferrante had 169 receptions for 2,884 yards and 31 touchdowns in a nine-year career with the Eagles. He retired after his contract was sold to the Detroit Lions in 1950, when the team would not meet his salary demands. In seven seasons he started every game but one and played on three consecutive Eastern Division championship teams and two consecutive NFL championship teams. His best game was in 1948 when he had 184 yards and 3 touchdowns against Detroit. He holds an Eagles record for three consecutive games with touchdowns of more than 60 yards. He was also elected to the 1940s NFL All-Decade Team.

== Post career ==
He became a salesman for a brewing company, and later served as a volunteer coach at Monsignor Bonner High School, leading the school to its first Philadelphia city championship in 1959 as well as a second title in 1961. He also became the head coach of the Wilmington Comets during the 1965 season in Wilmington, Delaware. The Wilmington Comets competed in the North American Football League, a new professional league which had franchises in Pittsburgh, Wilmington, Baltimore/Annapolis, Mobile(AL), Lakeland (FL), and Huntsville (AL). The Comets had an affiliation with the Philadelphia Eagles, and later became the Pottstown Firebirds, when the franchise was moved to Pottstown (PA), and were featured in an NFL films feature film. Ferrante retired from his sales position in 1977, and died at age 90 in Yardley, Pennsylvania.

== NFL career statistics ==
Legend
| | Won the NFL Championship |
| | Led the league |
| **Bold** | Career high |

=== Regular season ===
| Year | Team | Games | | Receiving | | | | |
| Year | Team | GP | GS | Rec | Yds | Avg | Lng | TD |
|---|---|---|---|---|---|---|---|---|
| 1941 | PHI | 3 | 0 | 2 | 22 | 11.0 | 12 | 0 |
| 1944 | PHI | 10 | 4 | 3 | 66 | 22.0 | 45 | 1 |
| 1945 | PHI | 10 | 8 | 21 | 464 | **22.1** | 74 | **7** |
| 1946 | PHI | 11 | 9 | 28 | 451 | 16.1 | 48 | 4 |
| 1947 | PHI | 11 | 10 | 18 | 341 | 18.9 | 54 | 4 |
| 1948 | PHI | 12 | 0 | 28 | 444 | 15.9 | 66 | **7** |
| 1949 | PHI | 12 | 7 | 34 | 508 | 14.9 | 64 | 5 |
| 1950 | PHI | 12 | 11 | **35** | **588** | 16.8 | **75** | 3 |
| | | 81 | 49 | 169 | 2,884 | 17.1 | 75 | 31 |

=== Playoffs ===
| Year | Team | Games | | Receiving | | | | |
| Year | Team | GP | GS | Rec | Yds | Avg | Lng | TD |
|---|---|---|---|---|---|---|---|---|
| 1947 | PHI | 2 | 2 | **13** | **146** | 11.2 | **28** | **1** |
| 1948 | PHI | 1 | 0 | 0 | 0 | 0.0 | 0 | 0 |
| 1949 | PHI | 1 | 1 | 2 | 27 | **13.5** | 16 | 0 |
| | | 4 | 3 | 15 | 173 | 11.5 | 28 | 1 |
