= William R. Moore (American football) =

American football player (1922–2011)

Red Moore
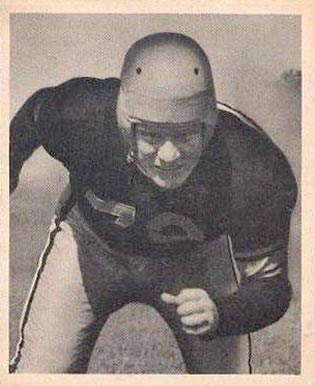
- Moore on a 1948 Bowman football card

No. 72
- Position: Guard

Personal information
- Born: December 14, 1922; Pittsburgh, Pennsylvania, U.S.
- Died: December 14, 2011 (aged 89); Palm Beach Gardens, Florida, U.S.
- Listed height: 5 ft 11 in (1.80 m)
- Listed weight: 248 lb (112 kg)

Career information
- High school: Rochester (Rochester, Pennsylvania)
- College: Penn State
- NFL draft: 1947: 14th round, 118th overall pick

Career history

Playing
- Pittsburgh Steelers (1947–1949)

Coaching
- Allegheny (1954-1957) Head coach; Cornell (1958) Line

Career NFL statistics
- Games played: 36
- Games started: 36
- Fumble recoveries: 2
- Stats at Pro Football Reference

Head coaching record
- Regular season: 11–19–2 (.375)

William Roy "Red" Moore Jr. (December 14, 1922 – December 14, 2011) was an American professional football player and coach. He played college football at Pennsylvania State University and three seasons in the National Football League (NFL) with the Pittsburgh Steelers (1947–1949). captained the Penn State Nittany Lions football team in 1946. Moore served as the head football coach at Allegheny College in Meadville, Pennsylvania for four seasons, from 1954 to 1957, compiling a record of 11–19–2. He died on his 89th birthday in 2011.

== Head coaching record ==
Year	Team	Overall	Conference	Standing	Bowl/playoffs
Allegheny Gators (Independent) (1954–1957)
1954	Allegheny	2–6			
1955	Allegheny	2–6			
1956	Allegheny	4–3–1			
1957	Allegheny	3–4–1			
Allegheny:		11–19–2			
Total:		11–19–2			
