= 1948 NFL Championship Game =

Coordinates: 39.996°N 75.165°W

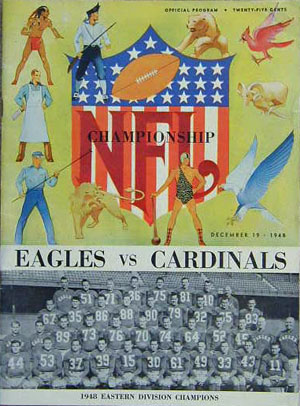
Chicago Cardinals (Western) (11–1)	Philadelphia Eagles (Eastern) (9–2–1)
0	7
Head coach: Jimmy Conzelman	Head coach: Greasy Neale
	1	2	3	4	Total
CHC	0	0	0	0	0
PHI	0	0	0	7	7
- Date: December 19, 1948
- Stadium: Shibe Park; Philadelphia, Pennsylvania
- Favorite: Chicago by 3½ points
- Referee: Ronald Gibbs
- Attendance: 36,309 (paid); 28,864 (actual)

TV in the United States
- Network: ABC
- Announcers: Harry Wismer, Red Grange

Location in the United States

The 1948 NFL Championship Game was the 16th title game of the National Football League (NFL), played at Shibe Park in Philadelphia on December 19.

The game was a rematch of the previous year's title game between the defending champion, the Chicago Cardinals (11–1), champions of the Western Division, and the Philadelphia Eagles (9–2–1), champions of the Eastern Division. The Cardinals were slight favorites, at 3½ points despite losing quarterback Paul Christman with a fractured wrist injury.

It was the first NFL championship game to be televised. Due to heavy snowfall, the grounds crew needed the help of players from both teams to remove the tarp from the field. The opening kickoff was delayed a half-hour until 2 p.m., and three extra officials were called into service to assist with out-of-bounds calls. The stadium lights were also turned on for the entire game.

The Eagles won their first NFL Championship, defeating the Cardinals 7–0 with a final quarter touchdown. It was also the first championship for Philadelphia since 1926, when the Frankford Yellow Jackets won the league championship on standings, (the Championship Game was introduced in 1933).

== Game summary ==
The game (also known as the Philly Blizzard) was played in Philadelphia during a significant snowstorm. Bert Bell, the NFL commissioner (and former Eagles owner), had considered postponing the game, but the players for both teams wanted to play the game. The snow began at daybreak and by kickoff the accumulation was 4 inches (10 cm) at a temperature of 27 °F (−3 °C). The paid attendance for the game was 36,309, but the actual turnout at Shibe Park was 28,864.

It was a scoreless game until early in the fourth quarter when, after Chicago had fumbled in their own end of the field, the Eagles recovered the fumble that set up Steve Van Buren's five-yard touchdown at 1:05 into the fourth quarter. The game ended with the Eagles deep in Chicago territory. Eagles head coach Greasy Neale gave a majority of the credit for the win to veteran quarterback Tommy Thompson.

With only five pass completions on 23 attempts for both teams, the game was completed in two hours and two minutes.

=== Scoring summary ===
Philadelphia Eagles 7, Chicago Cardinals 0

Quarter	1	2	3	4	Total
Cardinals	0	0	0	0	0
Eagles	0	0	0	7	7

at Shibe Park, Philadelphia, Pennsylvania

- Date: December 19, 1948
- Game time: 2 p.m. EST
- Game attendance: 36,309 (paid); 28,864 (actual)
- Pro-Football-Reference.com

Game information
- First quarter
  - no scoring
- Second quarter
  - no scoring
- Third quarter
  - no scoring
- Fourth quarter
  - PHI – Steve Van Buren 5-yard run (Cliff Patton kick). Eagles 7–0

Top passers

- CHI – Ray Mallouf – 3/7, 35 yards
- PHI – Tommy Thompson – 2/12, 7 yards, 2 INT

Top rushers

- CHI – Elmer Angsman – 10 rushes, 33 yards
- PHI – Steve Van Buren – 26 rushes, 98 yards, 1 TD

Top receivers

- CHI – Billy Dewell – 1 reception, 16 yards
- PHI – Pete Pihos – 2 receptions, 7 yards

=== Statistics ===
Statistics	Philadelphia	Chicago
First downs	16	5
Rushing yards	225	100
Passing yards	7	38
Passing (C–A–I)	2–12–2	3–11–1
Punts–yards	5-183	8-298
Fumbles–lost	1-1	3-2
Penalties–yards	3-17	4-33

== Officials ==
- Referee: Ronald Gibbs
- Umpire: Samuel Wilson
- Head linesman: Charlie Berry
- Back judge: Robert Austin
- Field judge: William McHugh

The NFL added the fifth official, the back judge, in 1947; the line judge arrived in 1965, and the side judge in 1978.

== Players' shares ==
The gross receipts for the game, including radio and television rights, were just under $224,000 ($3 million in 2025). Each player on the winning Eagles team received $1,540 ($20,636 in 2025), while each Cardinals player made $879 ($11,779 in 2025).

== Aftermath ==
Eagles' owner Lex Thompson was in the hospital for appendicitis during the game. He sold the team a few weeks after this game to the Happy Hundred syndicate for $250,000 (equal to $3,382,867 today), and died six years later of a heart attack at the age of 43.

The Eagles repeated as champions in 1949, winning in mud and heavy rain in Los Angeles. This 1948 game was the only time Shibe Park hosted an NFL Championship Game, as Franklin Field was the site for the Eagles' third Championship win in 1960, and they won their fourth NFL title in Super Bowl LII at Minneapolis in February 2018.

This game was the Cardinals' last appearance in any NFL Championship Game until Super Bowl XLIII in February 2009: the Cardinals had to beat the Eagles in the 2008 NFC Championship Game to reach the Super Bowl.

This game was the lowest scoring of any NFL Championship Game, the only one with only one score, and the only one to be won with a single-digit score. It remains the second-lowest scoring postseason game in NFL history, eclipsed only by the Dallas Cowboys' 5–0 win over the Detroit Lions in 1970.
