= Dick Poillon =

American football player (1920–1994)

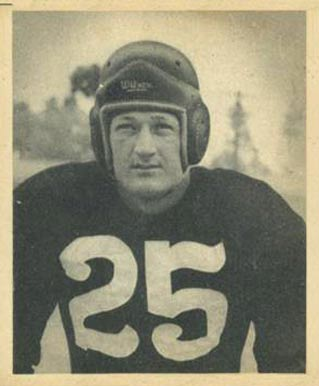
- Poillon on a 1948 Bowman football card

No. 25
- Positions: Halfback, defensive back, placekicker, punter

Personal information
- Born: August 13, 1920; Queens, New York, U.S.
- Died: November 14, 1994 (aged 74); West Palm Beach, Florida, U.S.
- Listed height: 6 ft 0 in (1.83 m)
- Listed weight: 193 lb (88 kg)

Career information
- High school: Valley Stream Central (Valley Stream, New York)
- College: Canisius (1940)
- NFL draft: 1942: undrafted

Career history
- Washington Redskins (1942, 1946–1949)

Awards and highlights
- NFL champion (1942); Pro Bowl (1942)

Career NFL statistics
- Rushing yards: 535
- Rushing average: 2.9
- Receptions: 37
- Receiving yards: 477
- Punt yards: 5,804
- Total touchdowns: 10
- Stats at Pro Football Reference

Richard Charles Poillon (August 13, 1920 – November 14, 1994) was an American professional football halfback in the National Football League (NFL) for the Washington Redskins. He scored a career 247 points and was the Redskins' leading scorer for three years.

Raised in Valley Stream, New York, he attended Valley Stream Central High School, where he played baseball, basketball and football, as a quarterback, kicker, punter and kick / punt returner. He was inducted into the Nassau County High School Athletics Hall of Fame in 2022. He attended Canisius College.

Poillon was voted one of the Redskins' "Top 100 players" of all time by a poll by The Washington Post. He had held the Redskins' record with an interception returned for 93 yards and a touchdown set against the Philadelphia Eagles on November 21, 1948, and broken on December 26, 1987, with a 100-yard return by Barry Wilburn.
