= Paul Davis (fullback) =

American football player (1925–1989)

No. 77
- Positions: Fullback, defensive back

Personal information
- Born: March 21, 1925; Ashland, Kentucky, U.S.
- Died: February 21, 1989 (aged 63); Loxahatchee, Florida, U.S.
- Listed height: 6 ft 1 in (1.85 m)
- Listed weight: 188 lb (85 kg)

Career information
- College: Ohio State; Otterbein
- NFL draft: 1947: 24th round, 218th overall pick

Career history
- Pittsburgh Steelers (1947–1948)

Career NFL statistics
- Rushing yards: 4
- Rushing average: 0.7
- Interceptions: 1
- Fumble recoveries: 3
- Stats at Pro Football Reference

Paul James Davis (March 21, 1925 – February 21, 1989) was an American professional football player who played for two seasons for the Pittsburgh Steelers of the National Football League (NFL). He played college football at Ohio State University and Otterbein University.
