= Bryant Meeks =

American football player (1926–2007)

No. 64
- Positions: Center, linebacker

Personal information
- Born: January 16, 1926; Jacksonville, Florida, U.S.
- Died: May 30, 2007 (aged 81); Dublin, Georgia, U.S.
- Listed height: 6 ft 2 in (1.88 m)
- Listed weight: 193 lb (88 kg)

Career information
- High school: DeLand (DeLand, Florida)
- College: Georgia; South Carolina
- NFL draft: 1947: 7th round, 49th overall pick

Career history
- Pittsburgh Steelers (1947–1948)

Awards and highlights
- Second-team All-American (1946); First-team All-SoCon (1946)

Career NFL statistics
- Games played: 18
- Games started: 3
- Fumble recoveries: 2
- Stats at Pro Football Reference

Bryant Meeks (January 16, 1926 – May 30, 2007) was an American professional football center and linebacker. He played for the Pittsburgh Steelers from 1947 to 1948.

He died on May 30, 2007, in Dublin, Georgia at age 81.
