= Bob Cifers =

American football player (1920–2001)

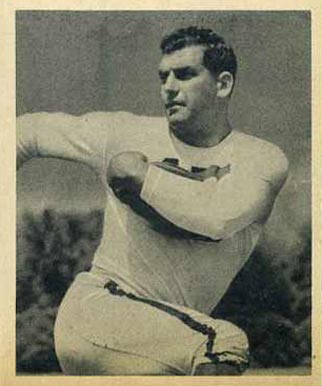
- Cifers on a 1948 Bowman football card

No. 84, 45, 46, 16
- Positions: Halfback, punter

Personal information
- Born: September 5, 1920; Church Hill, Tennessee, U.S.
- Died: July 1, 2001 (aged 80); Nashville, Tennessee, U.S.
- Listed height: 5 ft 11 in (1.80 m)
- Listed weight: 201 lb (91 kg)

Career information
- High school: Dobyns-Bennett (Kingsport, Tennessee)
- College: Tennessee (1940-1942)
- NFL draft: 1944: 2nd round, 14th overall pick

Career history
- Detroit Lions (1946); Pittsburgh Steelers (1947–1948); Green Bay Packers (1949)

Awards and highlights
- Second-team All-SEC (1942); NFL record: Highest average punting yards in a game: 61.75 (1946)

Career NFL statistics
- Rushing yards: 787
- Rushing average: 3.4
- Receptions: 12
- Receiving yards: 296
- Total touchdowns: 5
- Stats at Pro Football Reference

Robert Gale "Bobby" Cifers (September 5, 1920 – July 1, 2001) was a professional American football halfback and punter in the National Football League (NFL) for the Detroit Lions, the Pittsburgh Steelers, and the Green Bay Packers. Cifers died in a Nashville, Tennessee hospital of an unknown cause.

A star player at the University of Tennessee, he was selected by the Detroit Lions as the 14th overall pick in the first round of the 1944 NFL draft.

He missed the 1943–1945 seasons to fight in World War II as part of the United States Army Air Corps. During that time he played football for Randolph Field in 1944 (which finished ranked #3 in college football and won the Treasury Bond Bowl) and the AAFTC Skymasters in 1945, which played in and lost the Legion Bowl.

His first NFL season was with the Lions in 1946, during which he led the league in punting average as a rookie. On November 24, 1946, he set the record for the highest punting average in an NFL game when he averaged 61.75 yards for four punts against the Chicago Bears. He played halfback and defensive back for the Pittsburgh Steelers for two seasons in 1947 and 1948 and then finished his NFL career with the Green Bay Packers in 1949.
