= John Mastrangelo =

American football player (1926–1987)

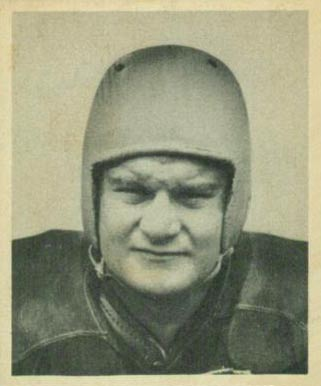
- Mastrangelo on a 1948 Bowman football card

No. 75, 65, 32, 66
- Positions: Guard, tackle

Personal information
- Born: March 10, 1926; Vandergrift, Pennsylvania, U.S.
- Died: October 2, 1987 (aged 61); Vandergrift, Pennsylvania, U.S.
- Listed height: 6 ft 1 in (1.85 m)
- Listed weight: 228 lb (103 kg)

Career information
- High school: Vandergrift
- College: Notre Dame (1944-1946)
- NFL draft: 1947: 3rd round, 16th overall pick

Career history
- Pittsburgh Steelers (1947–1948); New York Yankees (1949); New York Giants (1950)

Awards and highlights
- National champion (1946); 2× First-team All-American (1945, 1946)

Career NFL/AAFC statistics
- Games played: 44
- Games started: 15
- Fumble recoveries: 2
- Stats at Pro Football Reference

John Battista Mastrangelo (March 10, 1926 – October 2, 1987) was an American professional football player in the National Football League (NFL). He made his NFL debut in 1947 with the Pittsburgh Steelers. He played in the NFL for 4 years, playing for the Steelers, New York Yankees (AAFC) and New York Giants over the course of his career.

Prior to joining the NFL, Mastrangelo played college football for the Notre Dame Fighting Irish, twice receiving first-team All-American honors. He also played in the College All-Star Game in 1947.

"An All-American on Notre Dame's great 1946 eleven... A big, fast fellow who runs like a halfback Wears contact lenses... President of his class at Notre Dame.. Smart and aggressive... Will develop into one of the best linemen in the league."

— 1947 Pittsburgh Steelers Media Guide
