= Bob Davis (end) =

American football player (1921–1998)

No. 28
- Position: End / Defensive end

Personal information
- Born: September 26, 1921; Monongahela, Pennsylvania, U.S.
- Died: November 16, 1998 (aged 77); Pleasant Hills, Pennsylvania, U.S.
- Listed height: 5 ft 11 in (1.80 m)
- Listed weight: 192 lb (87 kg)

Career information
- High school: Monongahela (PA)
- College: Penn State
- NFL draft: 1946: undrafted

Career history
- Pittsburgh Steelers (1946–1950)

Awards and highlights
- First-team All-Eastern (1942)

Career NFL statistics
- Receiving yards: 172
- Receptions: 8
- Total Touchdowns: 1
- Games played: 55
- Return yards: 11
- Fumble recoveries: 4
- Stats at Pro Football Reference

Robert Billingsley Davis (September 26, 1921 – November 16, 1998) was an American professional football end and defensive end who played for six seasons with the Pittsburgh Steelers of the National Football League (NFL). He played college football at Penn State University for the Penn State Nittany Lions football team.
