= Tony Compagno =

American football player (1921–1971)

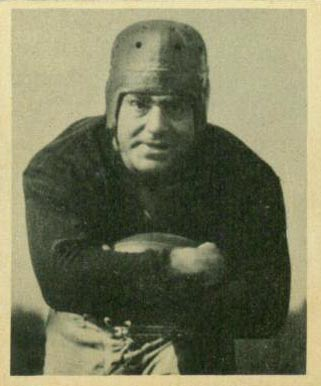
- Compagno on a 1948 Bowman football card

No. 44
- Position: Fullback

Personal information
- Born: January 29, 1921; San Francisco, California, U.S.
- Died: April 8, 1971 (aged 50); San Mateo, California, U.S.
- Listed height: 5 ft 11 in (1.80 m)
- Listed weight: 199 lb (90 kg)

Career information
- High school: Jefferson (Daly City, California)
- College: Saint Mary's (CA)
- NFL draft: 1943: 21st round, 197th overall pick

Career history
- Pittsburgh Steelers (1946–1948); Washington Redskins (1949)*
- * Offseason or practice squad member only

Career NFL statistics
- Rushing yards: 444
- Rushing average: 3.6
- Receptions: 18
- Receiving yards: 295
- Total touchdowns: 7
- Stats at Pro Football Reference

Antone Compagno (January 29, 1921 – April 8, 1971) was an American professional football fullback who played three seasons with the Pittsburgh Steelers of the National Football League (NFL). He was selected by the Steelers in the 21st round of the 1943 NFL draft after playing college football at Saint Mary's College of California.

== Early life and college ==
Antone Compagno was born on January 29, 1921, in San Francisco, California. He attended Jefferson High School in Daly City, California. He was the first person ever inducted into the Jefferson High School Sports Hall of Fame. Compagno was also inducted into the Daly City Sports Wall of Fame in 2005.

Compagno was a member of the Saint Mary's Gaels of Saint Mary's College of California from 1939 to 1942. He was invited to the East–West Shrine Game after his senior season.

== Professional career ==
Compagno was selected by the Pittsburgh Steelers in the 21st round, with the 197th overall pick, of the 1943 NFL draft. After serving in the United States Army during World War II, he signed with the Steelers in 1946. He played in ten games, starting eight, during the 1946 season, totaling 67 carries for 217 yards and one touchdown, eight receptions for 101 yards, one interception, seven fumbles, and five fumble recoveries. Compagno appeared in all 12 games, starting four, in 1947, recording 34 rushing attempts for 126 yards and two touchdowns, nine catches for 190 yards and one touchdown, four interceptions for 163 yards and two touchdowns, and six fumbles. His two interception return touchdowns were the most in the NFL that season. He also played in, and started, one playoff game that year and rushed four times for nine yards. Compagno played in all 12 games for the second consecutive season, starting one, in 1948, totaling 24 carries for 101 yards, one reception for four yards, one interception for seven yards and a touchdown, five fumbles, and four fumble recoveries.

Compagno signed with the Washington Redskins in 1949. However, he was released on September 12, 1949.

== Personal life ==
Compagno was a high school sports official after his NFL career. He died on April 8, 1971, in San Mateo, California. He was inducted into the San Mateo County Sports Hall of Fame on May 28, 1991.
