= Bill Cregar =

American football player (1925–2019)

No. 73
- Positions: Guard, linebacker

Personal information
- Born: May 2, 1925; Newark, New Jersey, U.S.
- Died: December 26, 2019 (aged 94); Glassboro, New Jersey, U.S.
- Listed height: 5 ft 11 in (1.80 m)
- Listed weight: 195 lb (88 kg)

Career information
- High school: Frank H. Morrell (Irvington, New Jersey)
- College: Holy Cross
- NFL draft: 1947: 18th round, 158th overall pick

Career history
- Pittsburgh Steelers (1947–1948)

Career NFL statistics
- Games played: 23
- Games started: 6
- Fumble recoveries: 2
- Stats at Pro Football Reference

William Osmund Cregar (May 2, 1925 – December 28, 2019) was an American professional football guard who played for the Pittsburgh Steelers. He played college football at the College of the Holy Cross, having previously attended Frank H. Morrell High School. He is a member of the College of the Holy Cross Athletic Hall of Fame.

Cregar later joined the FBI in the early 1950s and worked as a CIA–FBI liaison agent and then chief of the FBI counter-intelligence agency. A colleague, Jay Aldhizer described Cregar as having a "high profile in the intelligence community...a flamboyant personality, with a desk-pounding, get what I want type of relationship with CIA". He retired from the FBI as the assistant director of Foreign Intelligence and Counter Espionage in 1980.
