= Charley Seabright =

American football player (1918–1981)

Charlie Seabright
No. 25, 33
- Position: Back

Personal information
- Born: February 13, 1918; McMechen, West Virginia, U.S.
- Died: March 18, 1981 (aged 63); Bridgeport, Ohio, U.S.
- Listed height: 6 ft 2 in (1.88 m)
- Listed weight: 204 lb (93 kg)

Career information
- College: West Virginia
- NFL draft: 1941: undrafted

Career history
- Cleveland Rams (1941); Pittsburgh Steelers (1946–1950)

Career NFL statistics
- Receptions: 31
- Receiving yards: 241
- Receiving touchdowns: 3
- Stats at Pro Football Reference

Charles Edward Seabright (February 13, 1918 – March 18, 1981) was an American professional football player from Wheeling, West Virginia, where he spent the majority of his professional career with the Pittsburgh Steelers. Seabright played both offense and defense with the Steelers from 1946–1950, including stints as the starting quarterback. Seabright started every game for the 1947 Steelers in a season that ended in a one-game playoff to eventual champion Philadelphia. The Pittsburgh Post-Gazette considered Seabright, who wore number 33, a star player during the championship run. Seabright was one of the last NFL players to play both offense and defense. In addition, Seabright is recognized as being the last professional football player to be a quarterback in the "single-wing" formation, the precursor to the T-formation regularly used by all NFL teams. Seabright began his professional football career with the Cleveland Rams in 1941. However, he left football from 1942-1944 to serve in combat in World War II.

== College career ==
Seabright attended West Virginia University (1938–1941) where he is considered one of the two best players from that era, the other being Harry Clarke who went on to be a championship quarterback with the Chicago Bears. Seabright was inducted into the WVU Hall of Fame in 2004.
