= Cliff Patton =

American football player (1923–2002)

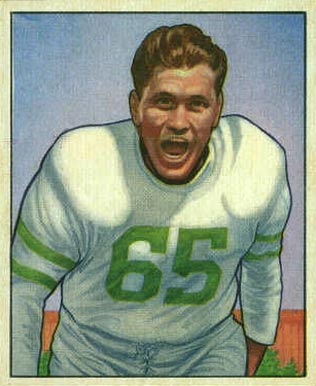
- Patton on a 1950 Bowman football card

No. 65, 68
- Positions: Guard, linebacker

Personal information
- Born: July 29, 1923; Clyde, Texas, U.S.
- Died: November 9, 2002 (aged 79); Comanche, Texas, U.S.
- Listed height: 6 ft 2 in (1.88 m)
- Listed weight: 243 lb (110 kg)

Career information
- High school: Big Spring (Big Spring, Texas)
- College: TCU
- NFL draft: 1946: undrafted

Career history
- Philadelphia Eagles (1946–1950); Chicago Cardinals (1951)

Awards and highlights
- 2× NFL champion (1948, 1949)

Career NFL statistics
- Field goals made: 33
- Field goal attempts: 69
- Field goal %: 47.8
- Stats at Pro Football Reference

John Clifton Patton (July 29, 1923 – November 9, 2002) was an American professional football player who was a guard for six seasons for the Philadelphia Eagles and the Chicago Cardinals.

Cliff Patton was a Philadelphia Eagle since mid-season, 1946. He was a top-notch place-kicker. Over 2 years he converted 60 straight extra points after touchdowns and kicked 50 of those within a single season, in 1948.

== Early life and education ==
John Clifton Patton was a native of Clyde, Texas. His parents were Dessie L. Merrick and J. W. Patton, deputy sheriff of Callahan County and Howard County. Patton had two sisters, Zirah and Bonnie.

Patton graduated from Big Spring High School then studied at Texas Christian University. While there, he played as a lineman in the TCU Horned Frogs football team. He also attended Hardin-Simmons University and served in the United States Army.

== Career ==
After finishing university, Patton played for the Philadelphia Eagles as a guard.

== Personal life ==
On July 14, 1948, Patton married Frances June Konczak at the St. Joachim Catholic Church in Clyde.
