= Charley Mehelich =

American football player (1922–1984)

- Mehelich in 1948

No. 55, 86
- Positions: Defensive end, end

Personal information
- Born: August 4, 1922; Oakmont, Pennsylvania, U.S.
- Died: December 2, 1984 (aged 62); Abington, Pennsylvania, U.S.
- Listed height: 6 ft 1 in (1.85 m)
- Listed weight: 199 lb (90 kg)

Career information
- High school: Verona (Verona, Pennsylvania)
- College: Duquesne
- NFL draft: 1945: 5th round, 33rd overall pick

Career history
- Pittsburgh Steelers (1946–1951)

Career NFL statistics
- Receptions: 15
- Receiving yards: 172
- Stats at Pro Football Reference

Charles J. Mehelich (August 4, 1922 – December 2, 1984) was an American professional football player.

A native of Oakmont, Pennsylvania, he played college football for the Duquesne Dukes. He was drafted by the Pittsburgh Steelers in the fifth round with the 33rd overall pick of the 1945 NFL draft and played professional football in the National Football League (NFL) for the Steelers from 1946 to 1950. He appeared in a total of 59 NFL games, 33 as a starter. He caught 15 passes for 172 yards. He was selected by the Chicago Herald American as a first-team All Pro in 1947. He also served in the Navy and played in 1945 on the Fleet City football team.

Mehelich died on December 2, 1984, at Abington Memorial Hospital (AMH), in Abington, Pennsylvania.
