= Johnny Clement =

American football player (1919–1969)

No. 23, 00, 72
- Positions: Tailback, quarterback

Personal information
- Born: October 31, 1919; Stonebluff, Oklahoma, U.S.
- Died: December 11, 1969 (aged 50) near Mountain City, Tennessee, U.S.
- Listed height: 6 ft 0 in (1.83 m)
- Listed weight: 189 lb (86 kg)

Career information
- High school: Stonebluff
- College: SMU (1937-1940)
- NFL draft: 1941: 4th round, 28th overall pick

Career history
- Chicago Cardinals (1941); Maxwell Field (1944); Eastern Flying Training Command (1945); Pittsburgh Steelers (1946–1948); Chicago Hornets (1949)

Career NFL statistics
- TD–INT: 20–39
- Passing yards: 3,226
- Passer rating: 47
- Rushing yards: 1,473
- Rushing average: 3.6
- Rushing touchdowns: 13
- Receptions: 2
- Receiving yards: 28
- Stats at Pro Football Reference

John Louis "Johnny Zero" Clement (October 31, 1919 - December 11, 1969) was an American professional football player who was a tailback and quarterback. He played college football for the SMU Mustangs from 1937 to 1940 and professional football for the Chicago Cardinals (1941), Pittsburgh Steelers (1946-1948), and Chicago Hornets (1949). In 1947, he led the NFL with an average of 5.2 yards per rushing carry in 1947, and his 670 rushing yards ranked second in the NFL. His career was cut short by a pinched nerve in his neck.

== Early life ==
Clement was born in 1919 in Stonebluff, Oklahoma. He attended Eldorado High School in Eldorado, Texas. He later enrolled at Southern Methodist University. He played college football as a halfback for the SMU Mustangs from 1937 to 1940.

== Professional football ==
=== Chicago Cardinals ===
Clement was selected by the Chicago Cardinals in the fourth round, 28th overall pick, of the 1941 NFL draft. He appeared in nine games, four as a starter, for the Cardinals during the 1941 season, tallying 690 passing yards and 94 rushing yards.

=== Military service ===
After the 1941 season, Clement served as an officer in the U.S. Army Air Corps during World War II. He was a B-29 pilot during the war. He also played service football for the 1944 Maxwell Field Marauders football team and 1945 Army Air Forces Training Command Skymasters football team. During the 1944 season, he completed 41 of 107 passes for 534 yards, scored 70 points, and tallied 862 rushing yards on 150 carries (5.7 yards per carry).

=== Pittsburgh Steelers ===
Prior to the 1946 season, the Cardinals traded Clement to the Pittsburgh Steelers. Clement had worn the jersey number "zero" while playing football for the military and became known as "Johnny Zero" in 1944. While playing for Pittsburgh, continued to wear the "zero" jersey number.

In 1946, Clement appeared in 11 games, tallying 345 passing yards and 60 rushing yards.

Clement had his best season in 1947. In 10 games, he completed 42 of 123 passes (42.3%) for 1,004 yards, seven touchdowns, and nine interceptions. He also tallied 670 rushing yards on 129 carries (5.2 yards per carry) with four rushing touchdowns. His average of 5.2 yards per carry was the best in the NFL, and his 670 rushing yards ranked second. At the end of the 1947 season, he was selected by the Associated Press for the All-NFL team.

In 1948, Clement appeared in five games, tallying 281 passing yards and 261 rushing yards. His season was cut short when he experienced numbness in his left arm. He had pinched a nerve in his neck in 1946, and the nerve injury recurred and cut short his 1948 season.

=== Chicago Hornets ===
In August 1949, having been offered no contract by the Steelers, Clement signed with the Chicago Hornets of the All-America Football Conference (AAFC). He completed 58 of 114 passes (50.9%) for 906 yards, six touchdowns, and 13 interceptions. His 906 passing yards ranked sixth in the AAFC. He also tallied 388 rushing yards (3.7 yards per carry) on 106 carries with five rushing touchdowns.

== Later life ==
Clement and his wife, Anita, had a son, Michael, born in 1948. Clement had been a pilot in World War II and flew his own private plane, a Cessna 210, in the 1960s. In January 1970, Clement was found dead in the wreckage of his Cessna that crashed near Mountain City, Tennessee. The aircraft had been reported missing on December 11, 1969.
