= 1947 NFL season =

American football season

Regular season
- Duration: September 21 – December 28, 1947
- East Champions: Philadelphia Eagles (playoff)
- West Champions: Chicago Cardinals

Championship Game
- Champions: Chicago Cardinals

NFL teams: West, East

The 1947 NFL season was the 28th regular season of the National Football League. The league expanded the regular season by one game from eleven games per team to twelve, a number that remained constant for fourteen seasons, through 1960.

The season ended when the Chicago Cardinals defeated the Philadelphia Eagles in the NFL Championship Game on December 28.

== Draft ==
The 1947 NFL draft was held on December 16, 1946, at New York City's Commodore Hotel. With the first pick, the Chicago Bears selected halfback Bob Fenimore from Oklahoma State University–Stillwater.

== Major rule changes ==
- A fifth official, the Back Judge, is added to the officiating crew.
- When a team has fewer than 11 players on the field prior to a snap or kick, the officials are not to notify them.
- An illegal use of hands penalty will be called whenever a defensive player uses them to block the vision of a receiver during any pass behind the offensive team's line.
- During an unsuccessful extra point attempt, the play becomes dead as soon as failure is evident.
- Roughing the kicker will not be called if he kicks after recovering a loose ball or fumble on the play.
- All teams are required to use prescribed standard yardage chains, down boxes, and flexible shaft markers.
- Games are no longer played on Tuesdays.

== Deaths ==
- October 24 - Jeff Burkett, age 26. Defensive Back and Punter for the Chicago Cardinals. Perished with 51 other passengers in the crash of United Airlines Flight 608.

== Division races ==
Starting in 1947, the NFL teams played a 12-game schedule rather than the previous 11 games. The twelfth game proved to be crucial for the Steelers, Eagles, Cardinals and Bears.

In the Eastern Division, Pittsburgh took a half-game lead over Philadelphia after a 35–24 win in Week Five.

In Week Eleven, the Eagles won the rematch, 21–0, to take a 7–3–0 to 7–4–0 lead, while the Cardinals lost to the Giants, 35–31, and the Bears beat Detroit 34–14, leaving the 7–3–0 Cards a game behind the 8–2–0 Bears in the Western Division.

In Week Twelve, the Cardinals beat the Eagles, 45–21, and Pittsburgh beat Boston 17–7, but the Bears lost to the Rams, 17–14.

The Steelers finished at 8–4, leaving the 7–4 Eagles needing to win their last game, while the Bears and Cardinals were both at 8–3, making the Bears-Cardinals game the following week a de facto playoff for the Western title: a tie would force a second playoff game between them.

In Week Thirteen, Philadelphia beat Green Bay 28–14 to force a playoff with Pittsburgh for the Eastern title, while before a sold-out crowd of 48,632 at Wrigley Field, the Cardinals beat the Bears 30–21 to win the Western title and the right to host the Championship Game.

== Final standings ==
NFL Eastern Division
	W	L	T	PCT	DIV	PF	PA	STK
Philadelphia Eagles	8	4	0	.667	6–2	308	242	W1
Pittsburgh Steelers	8	4	0	.667	6–2	240	259	W1
Boston Yanks	4	7	1	.364	3–4–1	168	256	L2
Washington Redskins	4	8	0	.333	3–5	295	367	W1
New York Giants	2	8	2	.200	1–6–1	190	309	L1

Note: Tie games were not officially counted in the standings until 1972.

NFL Western Division
	W	L	T	PCT	DIV	PF	PA	STK
Chicago Cardinals	9	3	0	.750	7–1	306	231	W2
Chicago Bears	8	4	0	.667	4–4	363	241	L2
Green Bay Packers	6	5	1	.545	5–3	274	210	L1
Los Angeles Rams	6	6	0	.500	4–4	259	214	W2
Detroit Lions	3	9	0	.250	0–8	231	305	L3

== Playoffs ==
Home team in capitals

Eastern Division Playoff Game

- Philadelphia 21, PITTSBURGH 0

NFL Championship Game

- CHI. CARDINALS 28, Philadelphia 21

== League leaders ==
Statistic	Name	Team	Total
Passing yards	Sammy Baugh	Washington Redskins	2938
Completion percentage	Sammy Baugh	Washington Redskins	.593 (210-for-354)
Touchdown passes	Sammy Baugh	Washington Redskins	25
Rushing: yards	Steve Van Buren	Philadelphia Eagles	1008
Rushing: touchdowns	Steve Van Buren	Philadelphia Eagles	13
Receiving: yards	Mal Kutner	Chicago Cardinals	944
Receiving: catches	Jim Keane	Chicago Bears	64
Receiving: touchdowns	Ken Kavanaugh	Chicago Bears	13
Total points scored	Pat Harder	Chicago Cardinals	102
Punting: average	George Gulyanics	Chicago Bears	44.8
Interceptions	Frank Reagan	New York Giants	10
	Frank Seno	Boston Yanks	10

== Coaching changes ==
- Boston Yanks: Herb Kopf was replaced by Maurice J. "Clipper" Smith.
- Los Angeles Rams: Adam Walsh was replaced by Bob Snyder.
