= List of Los Angeles Rams seasons =

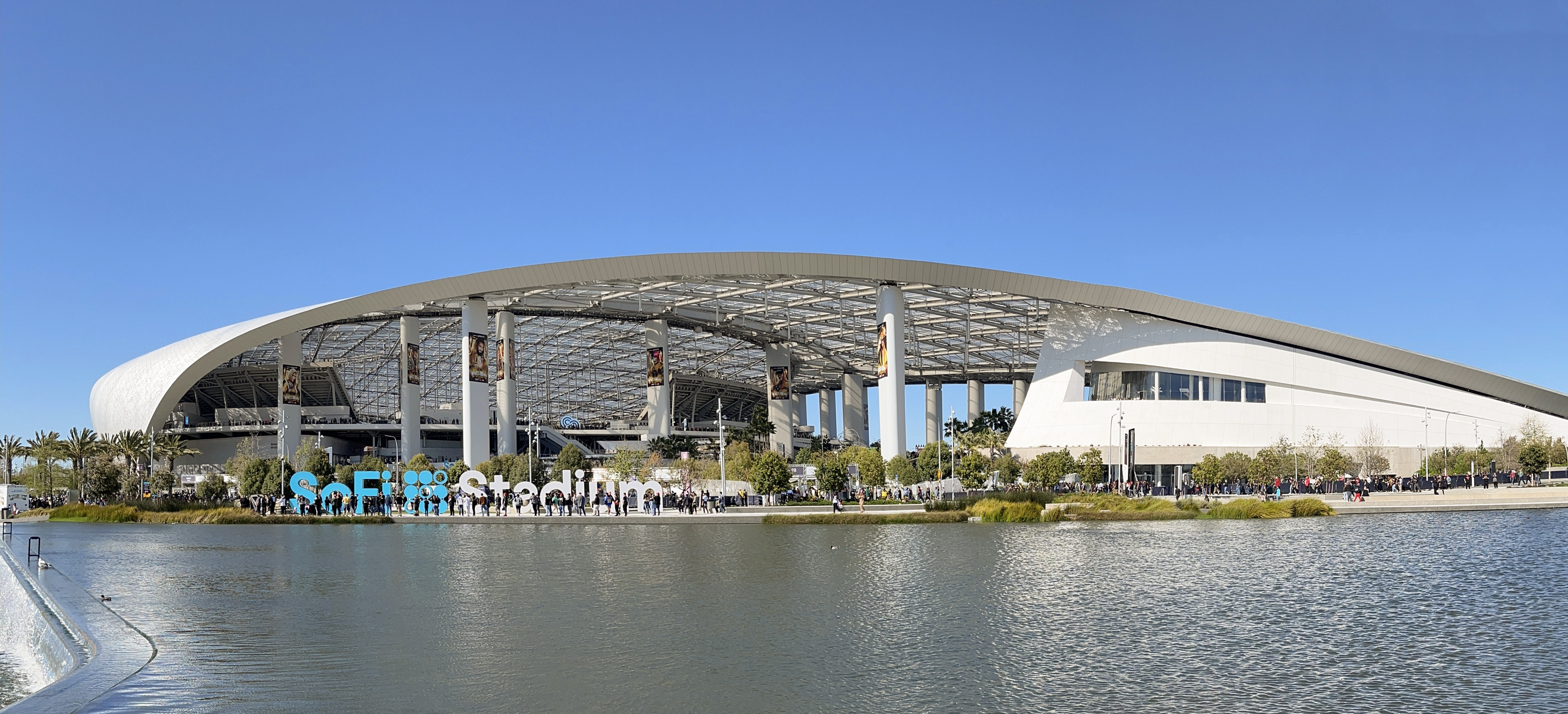
The Rams have played their home games at SoFi Stadium since 2020.

The Los Angeles Rams are a professional American football team based in the Greater Los Angeles area of California. The Rams have competed in the National Football League (NFL) since 1937, one year after their formation in Cleveland, Ohio, as a charter member of the second incarnation of the American Football League. The team moved to Los Angeles in 1946 where they became the city's first professional sports team. They first played their home games at the Los Angeles Memorial Coliseum before moving to Anaheim, California, in 1980, where they played their home games at Anaheim Stadium. The Rams moved to St. Louis, Missouri, in 1995, and remained there for two decades until they returned to Los Angeles after the 2015 NFL season. Currently, they are members of the Western Division of the National Football Conference (NFC) and play their home games at SoFi Stadium in Inglewood, California.

The Rams have won four league titles, two of which (1945 and 1951) pre-date the existence of the Super Bowl. The fourth and most recent championship was Super Bowl LVI, the team's most recent Super Bowl appearance. The Rams' four championships are tied for the tenth most total championships amongst all 32 NFL franchises. With their victory in Super Bowl LVI, they became the third franchise to win multiple Super Bowls representing two cities after the Raiders and Colts. They are also the only franchise to win championships representing three cities.

As of the end of the 2025 season, the Rams have an all-time record of 636 wins, 611 losses, and a 21 ties in the regular season, with an additional 29 wins and 30 losses in the playoffs. The team has had 43 winning seasons, 40 losing seasons, and 5 seasons with as many wins as losses. They have captured 19 divisional titles, 8 conference championships, and been to the playoffs 34 times.

== Seasons ==
Legend
^{(#)}	The order of league championship won by the franchise
Finish	Final position in league, division, or conference
Pct	The team's winning percentage for the season
^{†}	NFL champions (1920–1969)
^{‡}	Super Bowl champions (1970–present)
^{*}	Conference champions
^{^}	Division champions
^{§}	Wild Card berth
^{+}	One-Game Playoff Berth

Los Angeles Rams seasonal records
Season	Team	League	Conference	Division	Regular season					Postseason results	Awards	Head coach	Refs
Season	Team	League	Conference	Division	Finish	W	L	T	Pct	Postseason results	Awards	Head coach	Refs
1936	1936	AFL			2nd	5	2	2	.667	(Note: Although the team was scheduled to play against the Boston Shamrocks in the AFL's Championship Game, the Shamrocks were forced to forfeit the game after unpaid players on that team declined to participate in it.)		Damon Wetzel	
1937	1937	NFL		West	5th	1	10	0	.091			Hugo Bezdek	
1938	1938	NFL		West	4th	4	7	0	.364			Hugo Bezdek (0–3) Art Lewis (4–4)	
1939	1939	NFL		West	4th	5	5	1	.500		Parker Hall (MVP)	Dutch Clark	
1940	1940	NFL		West	4th	4	6	1	.409			Dutch Clark	
1941	1941	NFL		West	5th	2	9	0	.182			Dutch Clark	
1942	1942	NFL		West	3rd	5	6	0	.455			Dutch Clark	
1943	Team suspended operations due to World War II												(Note: The team suspended operations during the 1943 season due to a shortage of available players stemming from World War II.)
1944	1944	NFL		West	4th	4	6	0	.400			Aldo Donelli	(Note: During the previous season, the NFL again lowered the number of regular season games, which had been 11 games since 1937, to 10.)
1945	1945	NFL†		West^	1st^	9	1	0	.900	Won NFL Championship (1) (Redskins) 15–14	Adam Walsh (COY) Bob Waterfield (MVP)	Adam Walsh	
1946	1946	NFL		West	2nd	6	4	1	.591			Adam Walsh	(Note: In 1946, the NFL expanded its regular season schedule, which had been 10 games since 1943, to 11 games.)
1947	1947	NFL		West	4th	6	6	0	.500			Bob Snyder	(Note: In 1947, the NFL expanded its regular season schedule, which had been 11 games since 1946, to 12 games.)
1948	1948	NFL		West	3rd	6	5	1	.542			Clark Shaughnessy	
1949	1949	NFL		West^	1st^	8	2	2	.750	Lost NFL Championship (Eagles) 0–14		Clark Shaughnessy	
1950	1950	NFL	National*		1st*	9	3	0	.750	Won Conference playoff (Bears) 24–14; Lost NFL Championship (at Browns) 28–30		Joe Stydahar	
1951	1951	NFL†	National*		1st*	8	4	0	.667	Won NFL Championship (2) (Browns) 24–17		Joe Stydahar	
1952	1952	NFL	National		2nd+	9	3	0	.750	Lost Conference playoff (at Lions) 21–31	Hamp Pool (COY)	Joe Stydahar (0–1) Hamp Pool (9–2)	
1953	1953	NFL	Western		3rd	8	3	1	.708			Hamp Pool	
1954	1954	NFL	Western		4th	6	5	1	.542			Hamp Pool	
1955	1955	NFL	Western*		1st*	8	3	1	.708	Lost NFL Championship (Browns) 14–38	Dan Reeves (EOY)	Sid Gillman	
1956	1956	NFL	Western		T-5th	4	8	0	.333			Sid Gillman	
1957	1957	NFL	Western		4th	6	6	0	.500			Sid Gillman	
1958	1958	NFL	Western		T-2nd	8	4	0	.667			Sid Gillman	
1959	1959	NFL	Western		6th	2	10	0	.167			Sid Gillman	
1960	1960	NFL	Western		6th	4	7	1	.375			Bob Waterfield	
1961	1961	NFL	Western		6th	4	10	0	.286			Bob Waterfield	(Note: In 1961, the NFL expanded its regular season schedule, which had been 12 games since 1947, to 14 games.)
1962	1962	NFL	Western		7th	1	12	1	.107			Bob Waterfield (1–7) Harland Svare (0–5–1)	
1963	1963	NFL	Western		6th	5	9	0	.357			Harland Svare	
1964	1964	NFL	Western		5th	5	7	2	.429			Harland Svare	
1965	1965	NFL	Western		7th	4	10	0	.286			Harland Svare	
1966	1966	NFL	Western		3rd	8	6	0	.571			George Allen	
1967	1967	NFL	Western	Coastal^	1st^	11	1	2	.500	Lost Conference playoffs (at Packers) 7–28	George Allen (COY) Deacon Jones (DPOY)	George Allen	
1968	1968	NFL	Western	Coastal	2nd	10	3	1	.750		Deacon Jones (DPOY)	George Allen	
1969	1969	NFL	Western	Coastal^	1st^	11	3	0	.786	Lost Conference playoffs (at Vikings) 20–23	Roman Gabriel (MVP)	George Allen	
1970	1970	NFL	NFC	West	2nd	9	4	1	.679			George Allen	
1971	1971	NFL	NFC	West	2nd	8	5	1	.607		Isiah Robertson (DROY)	Tommy Prothro	
1972	1972	NFL	NFC	West	3rd	6	7	1	.464			Tommy Prothro	
1973	1973	NFL	NFC	West^	1st^	12	2	0	.857	Lost Divisional playoffs (at Cowboys) 16–27	Chuck Knox (COY)	Chuck Knox	
1974	1974	NFL	NFC	West^	1st^	10	4	0	.714	Won Divisional playoffs (Redskins) 19–10; Lost NFC Championship (at Vikings) 10–14		Chuck Knox	
1975	1975	NFL	NFC	West^	1st^	12	2	0	.857	Won Divisional playoffs (Cardinals) 35–23; Lost NFC Championship (Cowboys) 7–37	Jack Youngblood (DPOY)	Chuck Knox	
1976	1976	NFL	NFC	West^	1st^	10	3	1	.750	Won Divisional playoffs (at Cowboys) 14–12; Lost NFC Championship (at Vikings) 13–24		Chuck Knox	
1977	1977	NFL	NFC	West^	1st^	10	4	0	.714	Lost Divisional playoffs (Vikings) 7–14		Chuck Knox	
1978	1978	NFL	NFC	West^	1st^	12	4	0	.750	Won Divisional playoffs (Vikings) 34–10; Lost NFC Championship (Cowboys) 0–28		Ray Malavasi	(Note: In 1978, the NFL expanded its regular season schedule, which had been 14 games since 1961, to 16 games.)
1979	1979	NFL	NFC*	West^	1st^	9	7	0	.563	Won Divisional playoffs (at Cowboys) 21–19; Won NFC Championship (at Buccaneers) 9–0; Lost Super Bowl XIV (vs. Steelers) 19–31		Ray Malavasi	
1980	1980	NFL	NFC	West	2nd§	11	5	0	.688	Lost Wild Card playoffs (at Cowboys) 13–34		Ray Malavasi	
1981	1981	NFL	NFC	West	3rd	6	10	0	.375			Ray Malavasi	
1982	1982	NFL	NFC	None (Note: The 1982 season was shortened to nine games after a players' strike. The top eight teams in each conference advanced to the playoffs.)	14th	2	7	0	.222			Ray Malavasi	
1983	1983	NFL	NFC	West	2nd§	9	7	0	.563	Won Wild Card playoffs (at Cowboys) 24–17; Lost Divisional playoffs (at Redskins) 7–51	Eric Dickerson (OROY)	John Robinson	
1984	1984	NFL	NFC	West	2nd§	10	6	0	.625	Lost Wild Card playoffs (Giants) 13–16		John Robinson	
1985	1985	NFL	NFC	West^	1st^	11	5	0	.688	Won Divisional playoffs (Cowboys) 20–0; Lost NFC Championship (at Bears) 0–24		John Robinson	
1986	1986	NFL	NFC	West	2nd§	10	6	0	.625	Lost Wild Card playoffs (at Redskins) 7–19	Eric Dickerson (OPOY)	John Robinson	
1987	1987	NFL	NFC	West	3rd	6	9	0	.400			John Robinson	(Note: The 1987 NFL strike caused the schedule to be reduced to 15 games.)
1988	1988	NFL	NFC	West	2nd§	10	6	0	.625	Lost Wild Card playoffs (at Vikings) 17–28		John Robinson	
1989	1989	NFL	NFC	West	2nd§	11	5	0	.688	Won Wild Card playoffs (at Eagles) 21–7; Won Divisional playoffs (at Giants) 19–13; Lost NFC Championship (at 49ers) 3–30		John Robinson	
1990	1990	NFL	NFC	West	3rd	5	11	0	.313			John Robinson	
1991	1991	NFL	NFC	West	4th	3	13	0	.188			John Robinson	
1992	1992	NFL	NFC	West	4th	6	10	0	.375			Chuck Knox	
1993	1993	NFL	NFC	West	4th	5	11	0	.313		Jerome Bettis (OROY)	Chuck Knox	
1994	1994	NFL	NFC	West	4th	4	12	0	.250			Chuck Knox	
St. Louis Rams
1995	1995	NFL	NFC	West	3rd	7	9	0	.438			Rich Brooks	
1996	1996	NFL	NFC	West	3rd	6	10	0	.375			Rich Brooks	
1997	1997	NFL	NFC	West	5th	5	11	0	.313			Dick Vermeil	
1998	1998	NFL	NFC	West	5th	4	12	0	.250			Dick Vermeil	
1999	1999	NFL‡	NFC*	West^	1st^	13	3	0	.813	Won Divisional playoffs (Vikings) 49–37; Won NFC Championship (Buccaneers) 11–6; Won Super Bowl XXXIV(3) (vs. Titans) 23–16	Dick Vermeil (COY) Kurt Warner (MVP, SB MVP) Marshall Faulk (OPOY)	Dick Vermeil	
2000	2000	NFL	NFC	West	2nd§	10	6	0	.625	Lost Wild Card playoffs (at Saints) 28–31	Marshall Faulk (MVP, OPOY)	Mike Martz	
2001	2001	NFL	NFC*	West^	1st^	14	2	0	.875	Won Divisional playoffs (Packers) 45–17; Won NFC Championship (Eagles) 29–24; Lost Super Bowl XXXVI (vs. Patriots) 17–20	Kurt Warner (MVP) Marshall Faulk (OPOY)	Mike Martz	
2002	2002	NFL	NFC	West	2nd	7	9	0	.438			Mike Martz	
2003	2003	NFL	NFC	West^	1st^	12	4	0	.750	Lost Divisional playoffs (Panthers) 23–29 (2OT)		Mike Martz	
2004	2004	NFL	NFC	West	2nd§	8	8	0	.500	Won Wild Card playoffs (at Seahawks) 27–20; Lost Divisional playoffs (at Falcons) 17–47		Mike Martz	
2005	2005	NFL	NFC	West	2nd	6	10	0	.375			Mike Martz (2–3) Joe Vitt (4–7)	
2006	2006	NFL	NFC	West	2nd	8	8	0	.500			Scott Linehan	
2007	2007	NFL	NFC	West	4th	3	13	0	.188			Scott Linehan	
2008	2008	NFL	NFC	West	4th	2	14	0	.125			Scott Linehan (0–4) Jim Haslett (2–10)	
2009	2009	NFL	NFC	West	4th	1	15	0	.063			Steve Spagnuolo	
2010	2010	NFL	NFC	West	2nd	7	9	0	.438		Sam Bradford (OROY)	Steve Spagnuolo	
2011	2011	NFL	NFC	West	4th	2	14	0	.125			Steve Spagnuolo	
2012	2012	NFL	NFC	West	3rd	7	8	1	.469			Jeff Fisher	
2013	2013	NFL	NFC	West	4th	7	9	0	.438			Jeff Fisher	
2014	2014	NFL	NFC	West	4th	6	10	0	.375		Aaron Donald (DROY)	Jeff Fisher	
2015	2015	NFL	NFC	West	3rd	7	9	0	.438		Todd Gurley (OROY)	Jeff Fisher	
Los Angeles Rams
2016	2016	NFL	NFC	West	3rd	4	12	0	.250			Jeff Fisher (4–9) John Fassel (0–3)	
2017	2017	NFL	NFC	West^	1st^	11	5	0	.688	Lost Wild Card playoffs (Falcons) 13–26	Sean McVay (COY) Aaron Donald (DPOY) Todd Gurley (OPOY)	Sean McVay	
2018	2018	NFL	NFC*	West^	1st^	13	3	0	.813	Won Divisional playoffs (Cowboys) 30–22; Won NFC Championship (at Saints) 26–23 (OT); Lost Super Bowl LIII (vs. Patriots) 3–13	Aaron Donald (DPOY)	Sean McVay	
2019	2019	NFL	NFC	West	3rd	9	7	0	.563			Sean McVay	
2020	2020	NFL	NFC	West	2nd§	10	6	0	.625	Won Wild Card playoffs (at Seahawks) 30–20; Lost Divisional playoffs (at Packers) 18–32	Aaron Donald (DPOY)	Sean McVay	
2021	2021	NFL‡	NFC*	West^	1st^	12	5	0	.706	Won Wild Card playoffs (Cardinals) 34–11; Won Divisional playoffs (at Buccaneers) 30–27; Won NFC Championship (49ers) 20–17; Won Super Bowl LVI (4) (vs. Bengals) 23–20	Cooper Kupp (SB MVP, OPOY) Andrew Whitworth (WPMOY)	Sean McVay	(Note: In 2021, the NFL expanded its regular season schedule, which had been 16 games since 1978, to 17 games.)
2022	2022	NFL	NFC	West	3rd	5	12	0	.294			Sean McVay	
2023	2023	NFL	NFC	West	2nd§	10	7	0	.588	Lost Wild Card playoffs (at Lions) 23–24		Sean McVay	
2024	2024	NFL	NFC	West^	1st^	10	7	0	.588	Won Wild Card playoffs (Vikings) 27–9; Lost Divisional playoffs (at Eagles) 22–28	Jared Verse (DROY)	Sean McVay	
2025	2025	NFL	NFC	West	2nd§	12	5	0	.706	Won Wild Card playoffs (at Panthers) 34–31; Won Divisional playoffs (at Bears) 20–17 (OT); Lost NFC Championship (at Seahawks) 27–31	Matthew Stafford (MVP)	Sean McVay	
Totals 2 Super Bowl Championships 2 NFL Championships 5 NFC Conference Championships 2 NFL National Conference Championships 1 NFL Western Conference Championship 19 Division titles						636	611	21	.510	All-time NFL regular season record (1937–2025)			
Totals 2 Super Bowl Championships 2 NFL Championships 5 NFC Conference Championships 2 NFL National Conference Championships 1 NFL Western Conference Championship 19 Division titles						29	30	—	.492	All-time NFL postseason record (1937–2025)			
Totals 2 Super Bowl Championships 2 NFL Championships 5 NFC Conference Championships 2 NFL National Conference Championships 1 NFL Western Conference Championship 19 Division titles						665	641	21	.509	All-time NFL regular & postseason record (1937–2025)			
