= List of Los Angeles Rams head coaches =

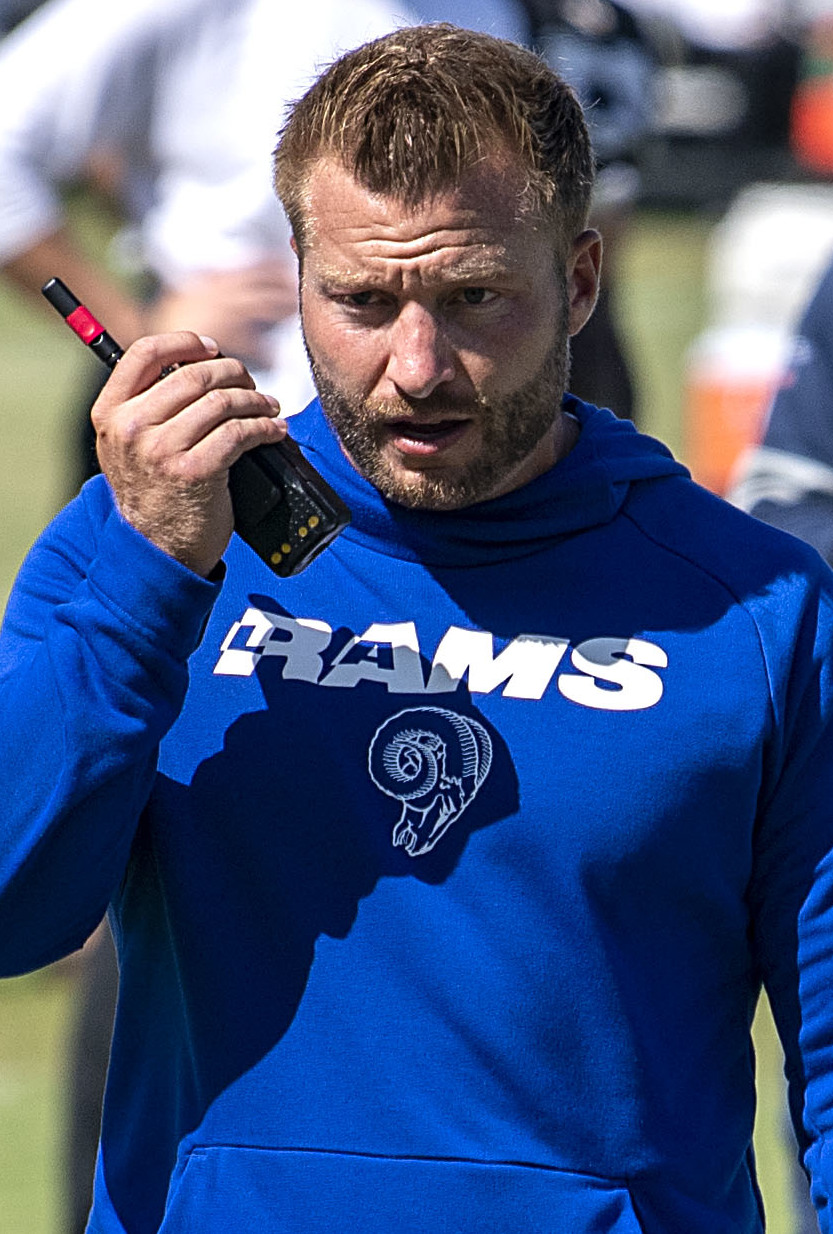
Sean McVay, the 28th and current head coach of the Los Angeles Rams

The Los Angeles Rams are a professional American football team based in the Greater Los Angeles area of California. The Rams have competed in the National Football League (NFL) since 1937, one year after their formation in Cleveland, Ohio as a charter member of the second incarnation of the American Football League. The team moved to Los Angeles in 1946 where they became the city's first professional sports team. They first played their home games at the Los Angeles Memorial Coliseum before moving to Anaheim, California in 1980, where they played their home games at Anaheim Stadium. The Rams moved to St. Louis, Missouri in 1995, and remained there for two decades until they returned to Los Angeles after the 2015 NFL season. Currently, they are members of the Western Division of the National Football Conference (NFC) and play their home games at SoFi Stadium in Inglewood, California.

From among the 28 head coaches throughout the team's history, Sid Gillman, George Allen, and Dick Vermeil were inducted into the Pro Football Hall of Fame in recognition of their contributions as coaches. Joe Stydahar and Bob Waterfield were also inducted into the Hall of Fame, although they were recognized for their contributions as players, not coaches. Five coaches have been recognized as coach of the year by major news organizations: Adam Walsh in 1945, Hamp Pool in 1952, Allen in 1967, Chuck Knox in 1973, Vermeil in 1999, and Sean McVay in 2017. (Note: Attributed to multiple references:)

== History ==
Damon Wetzel was the Rams' first head coach in 1936. Although the team was scheduled to play against the Boston Shamrocks in the AFL's Championship Game, the Shamrocks were forced to forfeit the game after unpaid players on that team declined to participate in it. The Rams then moved to the NFL the following year and hired Hugo Bezdek as their new head coach. During his tenure, however, he coached the team to only a single win in his first year. Bezdek was later fired after three games to start the 1938 NFL season and was replaced by assistant coach Art Lewis for the remainder of the year. The Rams continued to struggle under subsequent head coaches Dutch Clark and Aldo Donelli, none of whom had a winning percentage of over .400. The team finally found success under Adam Walsh, who guided the Rams to the franchise's first NFL Championship in 1945. Walsh remained head coach during the team's relocation to Los Angeles in 1946 before being replaced by Bob Snyder in 1947. Snyder's tenure turned out to be short due to then-owner Dan Reeves firing him prior to the start of the 1949 NFL season and replacing him with newly-minted advisor Clark Shaughnessy. For the next three seasons, Shaughnessy and his successor Joe Stydahar, who was previously the team's line coach, led the team to three consecutive playoff berths, including the franchise's second NFL Championship in 1951. The following season, however, tensions between Stydahar and backfield coach Hamp Pool led the former to resign and the latter succeeding him as head coach. Pool led the Rams to a playoff berth as did his successor Sid Gillman.

After Gillman left to coach the Los Angeles Chargers in the newly-formed third incarnation of the American Football League, the team languished from 1960 to 1965 under head coaches Bob Waterfield and Harland Svare whose tenures yielded winning percentages no higher than .279. In 1966, the Rams hired George Allen as head coach where he led the team to two playoff berths in five seasons. After Allen stepped down following the 1970 NFL season, Tommy Prothro was hired as head coach and served for two seasons until he was replaced with Chuck Knox by new owner Carroll Rosenbloom. From 1973 to 1980, Knox and his successor Ray Malavasi guided the team to seven straight NFC West division titles and eight consecutive playoff berths including an appearance in Super Bowl XIV at the end of the 1979 NFL season, the first in team history. After the 1982 season concluded, Malvasi was replaced by former USC head coach John Robinson. During his time as head coach, Robinson led the team to six playoff berths and one division title. He is still the Rams' leader in years as head coach (9), regular season games coached (143), and regular season loses (68). After a 3–13 finish in 1991, Robinson was fired and Knox was rehired as head coach where he remained with the team for three seasons prior to the Rams' relocation to St. Louis.

For the Rams' first two seasons in St. Louis, Rich Brooks served as head coach before being replaced by Dick Vermeil in 1997. Despite two consecutive seasons where the team finished last in its division, Vermeil alongside a rejuvenated offense nicknamed The Greatest Show on Turf led the Rams to victory in Super Bowl XXXIV at the end of the 1999 NFL season, marking the franchise's first Super Bowl title. Upon Vermeil's retirement at the conclusion of the aforementioned season, offensive coordinator Mike Martz was named his replacement, leading the Rams to four playoff berths in five seasons, including an NFC Championship and an appearance in Super Bowl XXXVI. After Martz took a medical leave of absence five games into the 2005 NFL season, assistant coach Joe Vitt was hired as his replacement for the remainder of the season. From that point on through 2016, the Rams entered a 12-year period of poor results under the leadership of head coaches Scott Linehan, Steve Spagnuolo, and Jeff Fisher, with the latter's tenure occurring during the team's return to Los Angeles. Linehan, Spagnuolo, and Fisher were each fired in midseason, with Vitt, Jim Haslett and John Fassel serving as interim head coaches during that period. The Rams franchise's fortunes turned around with the hiring of Sean McVay as the 28th and current head coach of the team. Upon his hiring in 2017 at the age of 30, he became the youngest head coach in league history. In eight seasons, McVay has led the Rams to six playoff berths, four NFC West Division titles, two NFC Championships, including a loss in Super Bowl LIII in 2018 and a victory in Super Bowl LVI in 2021. Already the youngest coach to reach the Super Bowl three years earlier, McVay became the youngest head coach to lead a team to a Super Bowl championship. In 2024, McVay became the Rams franchise leader in regular season and overall coaching victories.

== Head coaches ==
Legend
†	Elected into the Pro Football Hall of Fame as a coach

Los Angeles Rams head coaches
# (Note: A running total of the number of coaches of the Rams. Thus any coach who has two terms as head coach is only counted once.)	Image	Name	Term			Regular season					Playoffs				Accomplishments	Refs
#	Image	Name	Seasons	First	Last	GC	W	L	T	Win%	GC	W	L	Win%	Accomplishments	Refs
1		Damon Wetzel	1	1936		9	5	2	2	.667	—	—	—	—		
2	Photo of Hugo Bezdak in 1924	Hugo Bezdek (Note: Hugo Bezdek was fired after three games were played in the 1938 season; assistant coach Art Lewis handled interim head coaching duties for the remainder of the season.)	2	1937	1938	14	1	13	0	.071	—	—	—	—		
3	Photo of Art Lewis in 1959	Art Lewis	1	1938		8	4	4	0	.500	—	—	—	—		
4		Dutch Clark	4	1939	1942	44	16	26	2	.386	—	—	—	—		
—		N/A (Note: The team suspended operations during the 1943 season due to a shortage of available players stemming from World War II.)	—	1943		—	—	—	—	—	—	—	—	—		
5		Aldo Donelli	1	1944		10	4	6	0	.400	—	—	—	—		
6		Adam Walsh	2	1945	1946	21	15	5	1	.738	1	1	0	1.000	1 NFL Championship Game (1945); 1 NFL Western Championship (1945); 1 Playoff Berth; 1 NFL Coach of the Year Award (1945)	
7	Photo of Bob Snyder in 1948	Bob Snyder	1	1947		12	6	6	0	.500	—	—	—	—		
8	Photo of Clark Shaughnessy in 1942	Clark Shaughnessy	2	1948	1949	24	14	7	3	.646	1	0	1	.000	1 NFL Western Championship (1949); 1 Playoff Berth	
9	Photo of Joe Stydahar in 1950	Joe Stydahar (Note: Joe Stydahar resigned after the first game was played in the 1952 season; backfield coach Hamp Pool assumed head coaching duties for the remainder of the season.)	3	1950	1952	25	17	8	0	.680	3	2	1	.667	1 NFL Championship (1951); 2 NFL National Championships (1950, 1951); 2 Playoff Berths	
10		Hamp Pool	3	1952	1954	35	23	10	2	.686	1	0	1	.000	1 Playoff Berth; 1 Sporting News Coach of the Year Award (1952)	
11	Photo of Sid Gillman in 1959	Sid Gillman †	5	1955	1959	60	28	31	1	.475	1	1	0	1.000	Inducted Pro Football Hall of Fame (1983); 1 NFL Western Championship (1955); 1 Playoff Berth	
12	Photo of Bob Waterfield in 1946	Bob Waterfield (Note: Bob Waterfield resigned with six games left in the 1962 season; Harland Svare assumed the role of head coach for the remainder of that season.)	3	1960	1962	34	9	24	1	.279	—	—	—	—		
13		Harland Svare	4	1962	1965	48	14	31	8	.254	—	—	—	—		
14	Photo of George Allen circa 1981	George Allen †	5	1966	1970	70	49	17	4	.729	2	0	2	.000	Inducted Pro Football Hall of Fame (2002); 2 NFL Western Conference Coastal Division Championships (1967, 1969); 2 Playoff Berths; 1 AP Coach of the Year Award (1967); 1 Sporting News Coach of the Year Award (1967); 1 UPI NFL Coach of the Year Award (1967)	
15	Photo of Tommy Prothro in 1968	Tommy Prothro	2	1971	1972	28	14	12	2	.536	—	—	—	—		
16		Chuck Knox	5	1973	1977	70	54	15	1	.779	8	3	5	.375	5 NFC West Championships (1973, 1974, 1975, 1976, 1977); 5 Playoff Berths; 1 AP Coach of the Year Award (1973); 1 Sporting News Coach of the Year Award (1973); 1 UPI NFL Coach of the Year Award (1973)	
17		Ray Malavasi	5	1978	1982	73	40	33	0	.619	6	3	3	.500	1 NFC Championship (1979); 2 NFC West Championships (1978, 1979); 3 Playoff Berths	
18		John Robinson	9	1983	1991	143	75	68	0	.524	10	4	6	.400	1 NFC West Championship (1985); 6 Playoff Berths	
—		Chuck Knox	3	1992	1994	48	15	33	0	.313	—	—	—	—		
19		Rich Brooks	2	1995	1996	32	13	19	0	.406	—	—	—	—		
20	Photo of Dick Vermeil in 2010	Dick Vermeil †	3	1997	1999	48	22	26	0	.458	3	3	0	1.000	Inducted Pro Football Hall of Fame (2022); 1 Super Bowl championship (XXXIV); 1 NFC Championship (1999); 1 NFC West Championship (1999); 1 Playoff berth 1 AP Coach of the Year Award (1999); 1 Sporting News Coach of the Year Award (1999); 1 Maxwell Football Club NFL Coach of the Year Award (1999)	
21		Mike Martz (Note: Mike Martz took a medical leave of absence after five games were played in the 2005 season; assistant coach Joe Vitt handled interim head coaching duties for the remainder of the season.)	6	2000	2005	85	53	32	0	.624	7	3	4	.429	1 NFC Championship (2001); 2 NFC West Championships (2001, 2003); 4 Playoff Berths	
22		Joe Vitt	1	2005		11	4	7	0	.364	—	—	—	—		
23	Photo of Scott Linehan in 2017	Scott Linehan (Note: Scott Linehan was fired after four games were played in the 2008 season; defensive coordinator Jim Haslett handled interim head coaching duties for the remainder of the season.)	3	2006	2008	36	11	25	0	.208	—	—	—	—		
24	Photo of Jim Haslett in 2021	Jim Haslett	1	2008		12	2	10	0	.167	—	—	—	—		
25	Photo of Steve Spagnulo in 2011	Steve Spagnuolo	3	2009	2011	48	10	38	0	.208	—	—	—	—		
26	Photo of Jeff Fisher in 2014	Jeff Fisher (Note: Jeff Fisher was fired with three games remaining in the 2016 season; special teams coordinator John Fassel handled interim head coaching duties for the remainder of the season.)	5	2012	2016	77	31	45	1	.409	—	—	—	—		
27		John Fassel	1	2016		3	0	3	0	.000	—	—	—	—		
28	Photo of Sean McVay in 2014	Sean McVay	9	2017	2025	149	92	57	0	.617	16	10	6	.625	1 Super Bowl championship (LVI); 2 NFC Championships (2018, 2021); 4 NFC West Championships (2017, 2018, 2021, 2024); 7 Playoff Berths; 1 AP Coach of the Year Award (2017); 1 Sporting News Coach of the Year Award (2017)	
