= 1945 Cleveland Rams season =

NFL team season (last season in Cleveland)

- Head coach: Adam Walsh
- Home stadium: League Park

Results
- Record: 9–1
- Division place: 1st NFL Western
- Playoffs: Won NFL Championship (vs. Redskins) 15–14

The 1945 Cleveland Rams season was the team's eighth year with the National Football League and the ninth and final season in Cleveland. Led by the brother tandem of head coach Adam Walsh and general manager Chile Walsh, and helmed by future Hall of Fame quarterback Bob Waterfield, the Rams franchise finished 9–1 before winning its first NFL Championship by defeating the Washington Redskins, 15–14, at Cleveland Stadium. Other stars on the team included receiver Jim Benton and back Jim Gillette, who gained more than 100 yards in the title game.

One month after winning the NFL Championship, the team's players and the franchise owner Dan Reeves, who had sustained five years of heavy financial losses (even during the team's championship season) because of poor home crowds, realized he had no prospect of the Rams competing in Cleveland with the AAFC's Browns, who were to commence play the next year, and relocated the Rams to Los Angeles. The Rams' move to Los Angeles marked the first of only two occasions that a professional football champion has played the following season in another city.

== Off season ==
=== NFL draft ===
| = Hall of Famer |

1945 Cleveland Rams Draft
| Round | Selection | Player | Position | College |
|---|---|---|---|---|
| 1 | 5 | Elroy "Crazylegs" Hirsch | End | Michigan |
| 2 | 16 | Milan Lazetich | Tackle | Michigan |
| 3 | 21 | W.G. (Dub) Wooten | End | Oklahoma |
| 4 | 32 | Jack Zilly | End | Notre Dame |
| 5 | 37 | Roger Harding | Center | California |
| 6 | 48 | Jerry Cowhig | Back | Notre Dame |
| 7 | 59 | Fred Negus | Center | Wisconsin |
| 8 | 70 | Johnny August | Back | Alabama |
| 9 | 81 | Dick Huffman | Tackle | Tennessee |
| 10 | 92 | Vern Walters | Back | Alma |
| 11 | 103 | Tom Fears | End | UCLA |
| 12 | 114 | Joe Winkler | Center | Purdue |
| 13 | 125 | Jack Aland | Tackle | Alabama |
| 14 | 136 | Chuck Uknes | Back | Iowa |
| 15 | 147 | Bill Lund | Back | Case Western Reserve |
| 16 | 158 | Bob Barton | End | Holy Cross |
| 17 | 169 | Dick Hoerner | Back | Iowa |
| 18 | 180 | Lee Kennon | Tackle | Oklahoma |
| 19 | 191 | Eagle Matulich | Back | Mississippi State |
| 20 | 202 | Bill Griffin | Tackle | Kentucky |
| 21 | 213 | Leroy Erickson | Back | Oregon |
| 22 | 224 | Ray Evans | Tackle | Texas-El Paso |
| 23 | 235 | Luke Higgins | Tackle | Notre Dame |
| 24 | 246 | Stan Nowak | End | South Carolina |
| 25 | 257 | Gene Konopka | Guard | Villanova |
| 26 | 268 | Ray Florek | Back | Illinois |
| 27 | 279 | Russ Perry | Back | Wake Forest |
| 28 | 290 | Pat West | Back | USC |
| 29 | 301 | Bill Davis | Back | Oregon |
| 30 | 312 | Charley Compton | Tackle | Alabama |

== Schedule ==
| Game | Date | Opponent | Result | Record | Venue | Attendance | Recap | Sources |
|---|---|---|---|---|---|---|---|---|
| 1 | September 30 | **Chicago Cardinals** | **W** 21–0 | 1–0 | League Park | 10,872 | Recap | |
| 2 | October 7 | **Chicago Bears** | **W** 17–0 | 2–0 | League Park | 19,580 | Recap | |
| 3 | October 14 | at **Green Bay Packers** | **W** 27–14 | 3–0 | City Stadium | 24,607 | Recap | |
| 4 | October 21 | at **Chicago Bears** | **W** 41–21 | 4–0 | Wrigley Field | 28,273 | Recap | |
| 5 | October 28 | at Philadelphia Eagles | **L** 14–28 | 4–1 | Shibe Park | 38,149 | Recap | |
| 6 | November 4 | at New York Giants | **W** 21–17 | 5–1 | Polo Grounds | 46,219 | Recap | |
| 7 | November 11 | **Green Bay Packers** | **W** 20–7 | 6–1 | League Park | 28,686 | Recap | |
| 8 | November 18 | at **Chicago Cardinals** | **W** 35–21 | 7–1 | Comiskey Park | 18,000 | Recap | |
| 9 | November 22 | at **Detroit Lions** | **W** 28–21 | 8–1 | Briggs Stadium | 40,017 | Recap | |
| 10 | December 2 | Boston Yanks | **W** 20–7 | 9–1 | League Park | 18,470 | Recap | |
Note: Intra-division opponents are in **bold** text.

== Standings ==
NFL Western Division
| | W | L | T | PCT | DIV | PF | PA | STK |
|---|---|---|---|---|---|---|---|---|
| Cleveland Rams | 9 | 1 | 0 | .900 | 7–0 | 244 | 136 | W5 |
| Detroit Lions | 7 | 3 | 0 | .700 | 5–2 | 195 | 194 | W1 |
| Green Bay Packers | 6 | 4 | 0 | .600 | 3–4 | 258 | 173 | L1 |
| Chicago Bears | 3 | 7 | 0 | .300 | 2–6 | 192 | 235 | W2 |
| Chicago Cardinals | 1 | 9 | 0 | .100 | 1–6 | 98 | 228 | L6 |

Note: Tie games were not officially counted in the standings until 1972.

== Postseason ==
=== NFL Championship Game: vs. Washington Redskins ===
NFL Championship Game

| Quarter | 1 | 2 | 3 | 4 | Total |
|---|---|---|---|---|---|
| Redskins | 0 | 7 | 7 | 0 | 14 |
| Rams | 2 | 7 | 6 | 0 | 15 |

at Cleveland Municipal Stadium

- Date: December 16, 1945
- Game weather: −8 °F (−22 °C)
- Game attendance: 32,178

In the first quarter, the Redskins had the ball at their own 5-yard line. Dropping back into the end zone, quarterback Sammy Baugh threw, but the ball hit the goal post (which at the time was on the goal line instead of at the back of the end zone) and bounced back to the ground in the end zone. Under the rules at the time, this was ruled as a safety and thus gave the Rams a 2–0 lead.

In the second quarter, Baugh suffered bruised ribs and was replaced by Frank Filchock. Filchock threw a 38-yard touchdown pass to Steve Bagarus to give the Redskins a 7–2 lead. But the Rams scored just before halftime when rookie quarterback Bob Waterfield threw a 37-yard touchdown pass to Jim Benton. Waterfield's ensuing extra point was partially blocked, with the ball teetering on the crossbar, but it dropped over to give Cleveland a 9–7 lead.

In the third quarter, the Rams increased their lead when Jim Gillette scored on a 44-yard touchdown reception, but this time the extra point was missed. The Redskins then came back to cut their deficit to 15–14 with Bob Seymour's 8-yard touchdown catch from Filchock. In the fourth quarter, Washington kicker Joe Aguirre missed two field goals attempts, of 46 and 31 yards, that could have won the game.

== Roster ==
Team photo of the 1945 NFL Champion Cleveland Rams.

1945 Cleveland Rams final roster
| Quarterbacks: 21 Jack Jacobs S; 10 Steve Nemeth S; 26 Albie Reisz S/P; 7 Bob Waterfield K/P/S; Ends/Receivers: 49 Jim Benton; 44 Ray Hamilton; 53 Red Hickey; 38 Floyd Konetsky; 30 Steve Pritko; 32 Bob Shaw | Linemen/Linebackers: 42 Gil Bouley T/DT; 65 Bob deLauer C/LB; 43 Roger Eason T/DT; 15 Roger Harding C/LB; 27 Milan Lazetich G/DG; 41 Les Lear G/DG; 64 Butch Levy G/DG; 17 Sonny Liles G/DG; 11 Riley Matheson G/DG; 31 Art Mergenthal G/DG; 39 Mike Scarry C/LB; 40 Elbie Schultz T/DT; 48 Rudy Sikich T/DT; 25 Joe Winkler C/LB | Backs: 34 Tommy Colella RB/CB; 24 Jim Gillette RB/CB; 18 Fred Gehrke RB/CB; 12 Harvey Jones RB/CB; 66 Don Greenwood FB/LB; 19 George Koch RB/CB; 20 Ralph Ruthstrom FB/LB; 36 Pat West FB/LB; 16 Walt Zirinsky RB/CB; rookies in italics |

== Awards and records ==
- Adam Walsh, Coach of the Year
- Bob Waterfield, League Most Valuable Player
- Bob Waterfield, NFL leader, Touchdowns (14 – tied)
