= 1945 Washington Redskins season =

NFL team season

- Owner: George Preston Marshall
- General manager: Sid Carroll
- Head coach: Dudley DeGroot
- Home stadium: Griffith Stadium

Results
- Record: 8–2
- Division place: 1st NFL Eastern
- Playoffs: Lost NFL Championship (at Rams) 14–15

The 1945 Washington Redskins season was the franchise's 14th season in the National Football League (NFL) and their 8th in Washington, D.C. The team improved on their 6–3–1 record from 1944. They won the Eastern division title with an 8–2 record but lost the NFL championship game to the Cleveland Rams, 15–14.

It was the Redskins' last postseason appearance for over a quarter-century, until 1971.

== Preseason ==
Game	Date	Opponent	Result	Record	Venue	Attendance	Sources
1	September 7	at Cleveland Rams	L 0–21	0–1–0	League Park	17,398	
2	September 11	at Chicago Bears	W 14–7	1–1–0	Wrigley Field	26,000	
3	September 16	vs. Chicago Cardinals	T 7–7	1–1–1	War Memorial Stadium (Buffalo, NY)	11,936	
4	September 23	Green Bay Packers	W 21–7	2–1–1	Griffith Stadium	27,125	
5	September 30	vs. Detroit Lions	W 21–14	3–1–1	Municipal Stadium (Baltimore, MD)	35,000	

== Regular season ==
=== Schedule ===
Game	Date	Opponent	Result	Record	Venue	Attendance	Recap	Sources
1	October 7	at **Boston Yanks**	**L** 20–28	0–1	Fenway Park	22,685	Recap	
2	October 14	at **Pittsburgh Steelers**	**W** 14–0	1–1	Forbes Field	14,050	Recap	
3	October 21	**Philadelphia Eagles**	**W** 24–14	2–1	Griffith Stadium	34,788	Recap	
4	October 28	at **New York Giants**	**W** 24–14	3–1	Polo Grounds	55,641	Recap	
5	November 4	Chicago Cardinals	**W** 24–21	4–1	Griffith Park	35,000	Recap	
6	November 11	**Boston Yanks**	W 34–7	5–1	Griffith Park	34,788	Recap	
7	November 18	Chicago Bears	**W** 28–21	6–1	Griffith Park	34,788	Recap	
8	November 25	at **Philadelphia Eagles**	**L** 0–16	6–2	Shibe Park	37,306	Recap	
9	December 2	**Pittsburgh Steelers**	**W** 24–0	7–2	Griffith Stadium	34,788	Recap	
10	December 9	**New York Giants**	**W** 17–0	8–2	Griffith Stadium	34,788	Recap	
Note: Intra-division opponents are in **bold** text.

== Playoffs ==
Round	Date	Opponent	Result	Venue	Attendance	Recap	Sources
Championship	December 16	Cleveland Rams	L 14–15	Cleveland Municipal Stadium	32,178	Recap	

== Standings ==
NFL Eastern Division
	W	L	T	PCT	DIV	PF	PA	STK
Washington Redskins	8	2	0	.800	6–2	209	121	W2
Philadelphia Eagles	7	3	0	.700	5–2	272	133	W1
Yanks	3	6	1	.333	3–2–1	123	211	L5
New York Giants	3	6	1	.333	2–4–1	179	198	L1
Pittsburgh Steelers	2	8	0	.200	1–7	79	220	L3

Note: Tie games were not officially counted in the standings until 1972.

== Roster ==
Team photo of the 1945 Washington Redskins, Eastern Division Champions.

1945 Washington Redskins final roster
Quarterbacks: 33 Sammy Baugh S/P; 30 Frank Filchock S; 31 Larry Weldon S; Backs: 18 Frank Akins FB/LB; 00 Steve Bagarus RB/CB; 44 Merl Condit RB/CB; 29 Bill DeCorrevont RB/CB; 61 Bob DeFruiter RB/CB; 34 Jim Gaffney RB/CB; 11 Cecil Hare FB/LB; 32 Sal Rosato FB/LB; 20 Bob Seymour RB/CB; 41 Dick Todd FB/S	Linemen/Linebackers: 42 John Adams T/DT; 55 Ki Aldrich C/LB; 27 Earl Audet T/DT; 17 Fred Davis T/DT; 53 Al DeMao C/LB; 37 Zip Hanna G/DG; 49 John Koniszewski T/DT; 51 Reid Lennan G/DG; 26 Al Lolotai G/T/DG; 48 Leo Presley C/LB/FB; 16 Everett Sharp G/DG; 39 Clem Stralka G/DG; 46 Joe Ungerer T/DT; 45 Marvin Whited G/DG	Ends/Receivers: 19 Joe Aguirre K; 38 Les Dye; 13 Tom Miller; 40 Wayne Millner; 43 Al Piasecky; 22 Doug Turley; Reserve: 35 Wilbur Moore RB/CB; rookies in italics
