= Fred Gehrke =

American football player and executive (1918–2002)

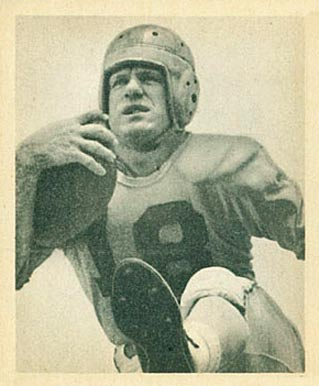
- Gehrke on a 1948 Bowman football card

No. 18, 22, 13, 25, 7, 11, 17
- Positions: Halfback, defensive back

Personal information
- Born: April 24, 1918; Salt Lake City, Utah, U.S.
- Died: February 9, 2002 (aged 83); Palm Springs, California, U.S.
- Listed height: 5 ft 11 in (1.80 m)
- Listed weight: 189 lb (86 kg)

Career information
- High school: South High School (Utah)
- College: Utah (1936-1939)
- NFL draft: 1940: undrafted

Career history
- Cleveland Rams (1940); Hollywood Bears (1942); Los Angeles Bulldogs (1943); Los Angeles Wildcats (1944); Cleveland / Los Angeles Rams (1945–1949); Chicago Cardinals (1950); San Francisco 49ers (1950)

Awards and highlights
- NFL champion (1945); Second-team All-Pro (1945)

Career NFL statistics
- Rushing yards: 1,664
- Rushing average: 4.9
- Receptions: 56
- Receiving yards: 529
- Interceptions: 13
- Total touchdowns: 24
- Stats at Pro Football Reference
- Executive profile at Pro Football Reference

Clarence Fred Gehrke (/ˈɡɜːrki/ GUR-kee; April 24, 1918 – February 9, 2002) was an American professional football player and executive. He played in the National Football League (NFL) for the Cleveland / Los Angeles Rams, San Francisco 49ers and Chicago Cardinals from 1940 through 1950. To boost team morale, Gehrke designed and painted the Los Angeles Rams logo in 1948, which was the first painted on the helmets of an NFL team. He later served as the general manager of the Denver Broncos from 1977 through 1981. He is the great-grandfather of Milwaukee Brewers left fielder and 2018 NL MVP Christian Yelich.

== Biography ==
=== Early life and college ===
Gehrke was born and raised in Salt Lake City. As a youth, he sneaked into Utah Utes football games. He there developed a love for the sport. He attended South High School where he participated in swimming, track and field, and football. He graduated from high school in 1935 and then attended the University of Utah, where he majored in art. At Utah, he started at running back on offense and left cornerback on defense. He also returned punts and kickoffs.

=== Cleveland Rams and World War II ===
Gehrke entered the National Football League as (NFL) an undrafted rookie. He landed a try-out with the Cleveland Rams in 1940. He was awarded a spot on team after he returned a kickoff for a touchdown in a pre-season exhibition game. His first contract with Cleveland paid him $135 per game. However, he did not play in many games that season because Parker Hall, the NFL's MVP in 1939, was the Rams' starting running back and his success kept Gehrke on the bench.

When the United States entered World War II in 1941, Gehrke reported for military service. However, he was denied entry in the armed forces when military examiners noticed an operation scar across Gehrke's knee; he was immediately designated with a 4F status. Gehrke appealed the decision but was still denied entry in the armed forces. However, Gehrke contributed to the war effort by landing a job with Northrop Aircraft, which was based in California, as a technical illustrator, and began helping with the design of airplanes. He was on the team that drafted and designed the P-61 Black Widow warplane.

In 1942, Gehrke joined the Hollywood Bears of the Pacific Coast Professional Football League, which at this time had a talent level considered to be on par with NFL, since many NFL players were in the military stationed on the West Coast and others were working in war industries there. The players worked their jobs during the day and then worked out and played their games at night. Gehrke played for the Los Angeles Bulldogs in 1943 and the Los Angeles Wildcats in 1944.

=== Return to the NFL ===
Once the war ended in 1945, Gehrke returned to the Cleveland Rams. That season, the Rams won the 1945 NFL Championship Game by defeating the Washington Redskins 15–14. Gehrke led the NFL that year in both average rushing yards, with 6.3 yards per rush, and an average punt return of 15.0 yards. He was then named to Pro Football Illustrated 's All-Pro team. In 1946 the Rams relocated to Los Angeles. That season, Gehrke was named to Pro Football Illustrated 's All-NFL second-team. He also repeated as the NFL's average rushing leader with 5.2 yards per carry. He also continued working at Northrup, since many players at the time took up jobs outside of football during the off-season. He would then take three months off to play professional football.

==== First helmet logo ====
In the mid-1940s, Gehrke toyed with the notion of painting a football helmet. Rams coach Bob Snyder suggested Gehrke paint a helmet with the ram horns on it that he could present to the team's owner Dan Reeves. Gehrke painted two ram horns on an old college helmet and presented the design to Reeves, who was intrigued. Reeves then contacted the NFL for a ruling on legality of having a football helmet painted. It was reported that the answer Reeves received from the NFL was "You're the owner; do what you want!" Reeves then tasked Gehrke to paint 75 helmets at $1.00 per helmet. The project took Gehrke the entire summer of 1948.

The newly painted helmets debuted during a pre-season match-up between the Rams and Redskins at the Los Angeles Coliseum before a crowd of 105,000. Upon seeing the new helmets the crowd began cheering, which was followed by a five-minute standing ovation. To this day, Gehrke's rams horn logo is still worn by the team. By 1949, the Riddell sporting goods company had created a plastic helmet, baking in Gehrke's design. Some observers of the 1950 NFL Championship Game said that the only way to tell the Rams and the Cleveland Browns apart in the initial low resolution coast-to-coast telecast was the distinctive horns on the Rams' helmets. Throughout the 1950s many professional and college teams began painting logos to their helmets.

The Pro Football Hall of Fame displays one of the original helmets, painted by Gehrke, along with the story behind it each year during Super Bowl Week. The logo innovation also earned Gehrke the Pro Football Hall of Fame's first Daniel F. Reeves Pioneer Award in 1972.

==== First facemask ====
Gehrke is also credited with developing the first helmet with a full facemask. He developed the face mask after having his nose broken three times during the 1946 season. He played the entire 1947 season with the facemask, which was made by Gehrke first applying a clay mold to his face. Once the mask dried, he had a few of the machinists who were running the power stamping machines at Northrop cover it with a sheet of aluminum. The manufactured piece of aluminum covered the nose, forehead and rested on the cheekbones to bear the brunt of blows. Gehrke then took the mask to his grandfather, who covered it in leather. In order for Gehrke to get the helmet on, it was cut up the back and laces were weaved into it.

While the mask protected Gehrke's face, it also obscured his vision on pass plays to the sides. He could only see the ball with one eye. However, on punt returns his vision was unobstructed. He returned to using the traditional helmet the next season.

== NFL career statistics ==
Legend
	Won the NFL Championship
	Led the league
**Bold**	Career high

=== Regular season ===
Year	Team	Games		Rushing					Receiving				
Year	Team	GP	GS	Att	Yds	Avg	Lng	TD	Rec	Yds	Avg	Lng	TD
1940	RAM	3	0	0	0	0.0	0	0	1	-2	-2.0	-2	0
1945	RAM	10	7	**74**	**467**	**6.3**	**72**	**7**	8	90	11.3	23	1
1946	RAM	10	10	71	371	5.2	53	3	11	83	7.5	21	**2**
1947	RAM	11	8	59	304	5.2	29	0	6	19	3.2	11	0
1948	RAM	12	8	56	246	4.4	24	1	**16**	**173**	10.8	34	1
1949	RAM	12	7	58	203	3.5	53	2	9	140	**15.6**	**42**	**2**
1950	CRD	7	1	3	4	1.3	9	0	2	-3	-1.5	13	0
1950	SFO	4	0	22	69	3.1	12	1	3	29	9.7	13	1
		69	41	343	1,664	4.9	72	14	56	529	9.4	42	7

=== Playoffs ===
Year	Team	Games		Rushing					Receiving				
Year	Team	GP	GS	Att	Yds	Avg	Lng	TD	Rec	Yds	Avg	Lng	TD
1945	RAM	1	0	**7**	**29**	4.1	-	0	0	0	0.0	0	0
1949	RAM	1	0	3	13	**4.3**	-	0	0	0	0.0	0	0
		2	0	10	42	4.2	-	0	0	0	0.0	0	0

== Retirement and broadcasting ==
Gehrke spent three more seasons with Rams. From 1945 to 1948, he beat out Tom Harmon and Les Horvath for the starting job at running back. Both men were Heisman Trophy winners. In 1950, he was traded to the Chicago Cardinals. In mid-season Chicago traded him to San Francisco 49ers. He scored his last touchdown with San Francisco. By this time, Gehrke was tired of the constant moving and traveling that came with being an NFL player. He retired as a player at the age of 31. Upon his retirement from professional football, Gehrke returned to Northrup and moved into an administrative post as head of the department. However, he was still involved in football. On weekends he would assist his former roommate, Harmon, who was announcing San Francisco 49ers and college football games. He held the job with Harmon for the next 13 seasons.

== Denver Broncos and the USFL ==
In 1964, Gehrke was approached by Mac Speedie, a former Utah Utes football player who was then the coach of the American Football League's Denver Broncos, to become a pro scout for Denver. Gehrke repeatedly turned down the offer. He finally accepted the position. He then rose from personnel director to general manager to vice-president of the team.

In 1981 the team was sold to Edgar Kaiser, a Canadian businessman who brought in his own personnel. Gehrke and coach Red Miller were asked to resign. However, Gehrke and Red Miller were hired by Denver Gold of the United States Football League. But after three years the league folded, and Gehrke's life in football finally came to an end.

Gehrke died at his home in Palm Springs, California, on February 9, 2002. He was buried in the Salt Lake City Cemetery.
