= Floyd Konetsky =

American football player (1920–1987)

No. 38, 54
- Position: End

Personal information
- Born: May 26, 1920; Marianna, Pennsylvania, U.S.
- Died: November 15, 1987 (aged 67); Cleveland, Ohio, U.S.
- Listed height: 6 ft 0 in (1.83 m)
- Listed weight: 197 lb (89 kg)

Career information
- High school: McCleelandtown (PA) German Township
- College: Florida
- NFL draft: 1943: 29th round, 275th overall pick

Career history
- Cleveland Rams (1944–1945); Baltimore Colts (1947)

Awards and highlights
- NFL champion (1945)

Career NFL/AAFC statistics
- Games played: 24
- Games started: 11
- Stats at Pro Football Reference

Floyd Walter Konetsky (May 26, 1920 – November 15, 1987) was an American college and professional football player who was an end in the National Football League (NFL) and All-America Football Conference (AAFC) for three seasons during the 1940s. Konetsky played college football for the University of Florida, and thereafter, he played professionally for the NFL's Cleveland Rams and AAFC's Baltimore Colts.

== Early life ==
He was born in Marianna, Pennsylvania. Konetsky attended German Township High School in McCleelandtown, Pennsylvania. He was captain of the German Township high school football team in 1938. Konetsky was the younger brother of Ted Konetsky, who was a prominent lineman for the Pittsburgh Panthers football team from 1937 to 1939.

== College career ==
Konetsky accepted an athletic scholarship to attend the University of Florida in Gainesville, Florida, where he played for coach Josh Cody and coach Tom Lieb's Florida Gators football teams from 1939 to 1941. Konetsky graduated from the University of Florida with a bachelor's degree in 1943.

== Professional career ==
The Cleveland Rams selected Konetsky in the 29th round (275th pick overall) of the 1943 NFL draft, and he played for the Rams during 1944 and 1945. During the Rams' 1945 NFL championship season, he played in all ten regular season games and started four of them. During his two seasons with the Rams, he played in eighteen games, started ten of them, and had one interception return for 15 yards. He signed with Baltimore Colts in October 1947, and played in six games for them, all but one in reserve.

== See also ==
- Florida Gators football, 1940–49
- History of the St. Louis Rams
- List of Florida Gators in the NFL draft
- List of University of Florida alumni
