= Sonny Liles =

American football player (1919–2005)

No. 62, 20, 17
- Position: Guard

Personal information
- Born: August 9, 1919; Marlow, Oklahoma, U.S.
- Died: July 25, 2005 (aged 85); Aspen, Colorado, U.S.
- Listed height: 5 ft 8 in (1.73 m)
- Listed weight: 188 lb (85 kg)

Career information
- High school: Clinton (Clinton, Oklahoma)
- College: Oklahoma A&M (1938–1941)
- NFL draft: 1942: undrafted

Career history
- Detroit Lions (1943–1945); Cleveland Rams (1945)

Awards and highlights
- NFL champion (1945)
- Stats at Pro Football Reference

Elvin Maerle "Sonny" Liles (August 9, 1919 – July 25, 2005) was an American professional football guard who played three seasons in the National Football League (NFL) with the Detroit Lions and Cleveland Rams. He played college football at Oklahoma A&M College.

== Early life and college ==
Elvin Maerle Liles was born on August 9, 1919, in Marlow, Oklahoma. He attended Clinton High School in Clinton, Oklahoma.

Liles played college football for the Oklahoma A&M Cowboys of Oklahoma Agricultural and Mechanical College. He was on the freshman team in 1938 and a three-year letterman from 1939 to 1941.

== Professional career ==
Liles served a stint in the United States Army after his college career. He went undrafted in the 1942 NFL draft. Liles signed with the Detroit Lions in 1943 and played in five games that year. He suffered a knee injury during the 1943 season. He became a free agent after the season and re-signed with the Lions on August 15, 1944. Liles appeared in nine games in 1944 and recorded one interception for 14 yards. He played in one game for the Lions in 1945 before being waived on September 25, 1945.

Liles was then claimed off waivers by the Cleveland Rams and played in eight games for them during the 1945 season, totaling one interception for six yards. Liles was eligible to play for Cleveland in their victory in that season’s championship, but did not.

== Personal life ==
Liles died on July 25, 2005, in Aspen, Colorado.
