= Walt Zirinsky =

American football player (1920–2001)

No. 16, 8, 60
- Positions: Halfback, defensive back

Personal information
- Born: August 1, 1920; Northampton, Pennsylvania, U.S.
- Died: November 30, 2001 (aged 81); Catasauqua, Pennsylvania, U.S.
- Listed height: 5 ft 11 in (1.80 m)
- Listed weight: 187 lb (85 kg)

Career information
- High school: Northampton
- College: Lafayette (1938–1941)
- NFL draft: 1942: 12th round, 102nd overall pick

Career history
- Cleveland Rams (1945); Philadelphia Eagles (1946)*; Scranton Miners (1946); Bethlehem Bulldogs (1947)
- * Offseason or practice squad member only

Awards and highlights
- NFL champion (1945); AFL champion (1947)

Career NFL statistics
- Rushing yards: 3
- Rushing average: 1
- Stats at Pro Football Reference

Walter John Zirinsky (August 1, 1920 – November 30, 2001) was an American professional football halfback who was a member of the Cleveland Rams team that won the 1945 NFL Championship.

== Early life and college ==
Walter John Zirinsky, known by the nickname "Walt," was born August 1, 1920, in Northampton, Pennsylvania. He was the son of Cyril Zirinsky and the former Mary Flisak.

Zirinsky attended Northampton Area High School, taking up the sport of football and excelled in it. Following his graduation from high school Zirinsky played college football at Lafayette College in Easton, Pennsylvania, where he was a halfback who also handled placekicking duties for the team. He was a star of the team from the 1940 season, scoring three touchdowns in a 46–0 rout of arch-rival Lehigh that capped off an unbeaten year.

== Professional career ==
Zirinsky was drafted by the Cleveland Rams of the National Football League in the 1942 NFL draft, selected in the 12th round, the league's 102nd pick overall. However, Zirinsky enlisted in the Naval Air Corps during World War II, where he flew blimps in the South Pacific. During the war years, he played football for a military service football team. He was discharged on October 8, 1945, as a Lieutenant.

He was discharged in time to play in the 1945 NFL season, signing with the Rams, the team which held his draft rights. Zirinsky played in five of the ten games played by the Rams during the 1945 season, a campaign which culminated with the team's 15–14 victory over the Washington Redskins in the 1945 NFL Championship Game. On the year he only carried the ball three times, gaining just three yards.

Zirinsky signed a second NFL contract in March 1946 with Rams General Manager Chile Walsh to play for the team during their inaugural season in Los Angeles. This was not to be, however, as in April the Rams traded the Pennsylvania native Zirinsky to the NFL's Philadelphia Eagles for fullback and punter Jack Banta, a native Californian who was a former collegiate star at USC.

Zirinsky never played for the Eagles, however, and his NFL career came to an end with just the three carries for the Rams and participation on an NFL championship team to his credit.

Zirinsky started all ten games for the Scranton Miners of the American Football League (AFL) in 1946, recording 75 carries for 300 yards and one touchdown, 17 receptions for 205 yards and one touchdown, eight interceptions, 37 punts for a 35.2 average, one kickoff return touchdown, and two extra points. The Miners finished the 1946 season with a 5–3–2 record, good for second place in the Western Division.

Zirinsky played in all nine games, starting one, for the Bethlehem Bulldogs of the AFL in 1947 and scored two touchdowns and 18 extra points. The Bulldogs finished first in the Western Division with an 8–1 record, and beat the Paterson Panthers in the AFL title game by a score of 23–7.

== Life after football ==
Zirinsky was married to the former Mary Laubach, with whom he had one son.

Following his retirement from the NFL, Zirinsky worked as a department chief for Western Electric in Allentown, Pennsylvania, where he worked for 37 years.

Walt Zirinsky died November 30, 2001, in Catasauqua, Pennsylvania. He was 81 years old at the time of his death. His family asked for donations to the American Cancer Society in Zirinsky's memory.
