= Rudy Sikich =

American football player (1921–1998)

No. 48
- Position: Tackle

Personal information
- Born: February 21, 1921; Hibbing, Minnesota, U.S.
- Died: January 4, 1998 (aged 76)
- Listed height: 6 ft 1 in (1.85 m)
- Listed weight: 220 lb (100 kg)

Career information
- High school: Hibbing
- College: Minnesota (1941–1944)
- NFL draft: 1944: 4th round, 29th overall pick

Career history
- Cleveland Rams (1945); Pittsburgh Steelers (1946)*; Los Angeles Rams (1947)*
- * Offseason or practice squad member only

Awards and highlights
- NFL champion (1945); National champion (1941)

Career NFL statistics
- Games played: 6
- Games started: 2
- Fumble recoveries: 1
- Stats at Pro Football Reference

Rudolph H. Sikich (February 12, 1921 – January 4, 1998) was an American professional football tackle who played one season with the Cleveland Rams of the National Football League (NFL). He was selected by the Brooklyn Tigers in the fourth round of the 1944 NFL draft. Sikich played college football at the University of Minnesota.

== Early life and college ==
Rudolph H. Sikich was born on February 12, 1921, in Hibbing, Minnesota. He attended Hibbing High School in Hibbing. In 2000, he was inducted into the Hibbing High School Athletic Hall of Fame.

Sikich was a four-year letterman for the Minnesota Golden Gophers of the University of Minnesota from 1941 to 1944. The 1941 Golden Gophers were national champions.

== Professional career ==
Sikich was selected by the Brooklyn Tigers in the fourth round, with the 29th overall pick, of the 1944 NFL draft. He signed with the Cleveland Rams in 1945. He played in six games, starting two, for the Rams during the 1945 season and recovered one fumble. Sikich also played in the 1945 NFL Championship Game, a 15–14 victory over the Washington Redskins.

Sikich signed with the Pittsburgh Steelers in 1946 but was later released. He signed with the Los Angeles Rams in 1947 but was released again.

== Personal life ==
Sikich served in the United States Marine Corps. He died on January 4, 1998.
