= Joe Winkler =

American football player (1922–2001)

No. 25
- Position: Center

Personal information
- Born: March 9, 1922; Hammond, Indiana, U.S.
- Died: March 21, 2001 (aged 79); Lansing, Illinois, U.S.
- Listed height: 6 ft 1 in (1.85 m)
- Listed weight: 200 lb (91 kg)

Career information
- High school: Catholic Central (Hammond)
- College: Purdue (1941–1944)
- NFL draft: 1945: 12th round, 114th overall pick

Career history
- Cleveland Rams (1945)

Awards and highlights
- NFL champion (1945)

Career NFL statistics
- Games played: 8
- Interceptions: 1
- Stats at Pro Football Reference

Joseph C. Winkler (March 9, 1922 – March 21, 2001) was an American football center who played one season with the Cleveland Rams of the National Football League (NFL). He played college football at Purdue University.

== Early life ==
Winkler played high school football at Catholic Central High School in Hammond, Indiana as a fullback. He earned Indiana Catholic all-state and Chicago Area All-Catholic team honors. He was also a two-time winner of the team's Outstanding Player award. Winkler graduated in 1941. He was inducted into the Hammond Sports Hall of Fame in 2002.

== College career ==
Winkler played for the Purdue Boilermakers as a center and graduated in 1945.

== Professional career ==
Winkler was selected by the Cleveland Rams with the 114th overall pick in the 1945 NFL Draft and played in eight games for the team during the 1945 season.
