= Al Donelli =

American football player (1917–2002)

Profile
- Position: Halfback

Personal information
- Born: December 22, 1917; Morgan, Pennsylvania, U.S.
- Died: August 8, 2002 (aged 84); Blacksburg, Virginia, U.S.
- Listed height: 5 ft 7 in (1.70 m)
- Listed weight: 165 lb (75 kg)

Career information
- High school: South Fayette (PA)
- College: Duquesne

Career history
- Pittsburgh Steelers (1941–1942); Philadelphia Eagles (1942)

Career statistics
- Rushing attempts: 17
- Rushing yards: 16
- Rushing touchdowns: 0
- Stats at Pro Football Reference

Allen A. Donelli (December 22, 1917 – August 8, 2002) was an American football halfback who played college football for Duquesne (1939–1940) and professional football in the National Football League (NFL) for the Pittsburgh Steelers (1941–1942) and the Philadelphia Eagles (1942). He appeared in a total of 12 NFL games.

== Early life ==
Donelli was born in 1917 in Morgan, Pennsylvania, and attended South Fayette High School in McDonald, Pennsylvania. He played college football for the Duquesne Dukes from 1939 to 1940. His older brother, Aldo Donelli, was the head coach at Duquesne at the time. The 1939 Duquesne team compiled an undefeated 8–0–1 record and was ranked No. 10 in the final AP Poll.

== Professional football ==
Donelli then played professional football for the Pittsburgh Steelers during the 1941 and 1942 seasons, appearing in 11 games. He also appeared in one game for the Philadelphia Eagles during the 1942 season. After the 1942 season, Donelli was drafted into the United States Army during World War II.

== Later life ==
After his release from the Army, Donelli attended dental school at the University of Pittsburgh. He practiced dentistry in Washington and Erie, Pennsylvania. He retired in 1988 and moved to Stuart, Florida. Donelli died from lung cancer in 2002 in Blacksburg, Virginia, at age 84.
