= George Koch =

American football player (1919–1966)

No. 19, 84
- Position: Halfback / Defensive back

Personal information
- Born: July 2, 1919; Temple, Texas, U.S.
- Died: September 5, 1966 (aged 47); Temple, Texas, U.S.
- Listed height: 6 ft 0 in (1.83 m)
- Listed weight: 200 lb (91 kg)

Career information
- High school: Temple (Texas)
- College: Baylor (1938–1940); St. Mary's (TX) (1941)

Career history
- Cleveland/Los Angeles Rams (1945–1946); Buffalo Bills (1947)

Awards and highlights
- NFL champion (1945)
- Stats at Pro Football Reference

George Theodore Koch (July 2, 1919 – September 5, 1966) was an American professional football halfback who played two seasons with the Cleveland/Los Angeles Rams of the National Football League (NFL) and one season with the Buffalo Bills of the All-America Football Conference (AAFC). He played college football at Baylor University and St. Mary's University, Texas.

== Early life and college ==
George Theodore Koch was born on July 2, 1919, in Temple, Texas. He attended Temple High School in Temple.

He was a member of the Baylor Bears freshman team in 1938. He was then on the main roster from 1939 to 1940. He transferred to play for the St. Mary's Rattlers of St. Mary's University, Texas in 1941.

== Professional career ==
Koch played in six games, starting one, for the Cleveland Rams of the NFL in 1945, rushing 12 times 101 yards and returning one kick for seven yards. He also appeared in the 1945 NFL Championship Game, recording two carries for one yard as the Rams won defeated the Washington Redskins by a score of 15–14. The next year, he played in one game for the newly-renamed Los Angeles Rams but did not record any statistics.

Koch played in thirteen games, starting seven, for the Buffalo Bills of the All-America Football Conference (AAFC) in 1947, rushing 37 times for 149 yards and one touchdown, catching one pass for 10 yards, intercepting three passes for 24 yards, returning one kick for 12 yards, and returning four punts for 84 yards.
