= Adam Walsh =

Adam Walsh may refer to:

- Adam Walsh (1974–1981), abducted American child
  - Adam Walsh Child Protection and Safety Act, sex-offender legislation signed on the 25th anniversary of Adam Walsh's abduction
- Adam Walsh (American football) (1901–1985), American football player and coach
