= Zirinsky =

Zirinsky is a surname. Notable people with the surname include:

- Susan Zirinsky (born 1952), American journalist and television news producer
- Walt Zirinsky (1920–2001), American football player
