= Chile Walsh =

American football player and coach (1903–1971)

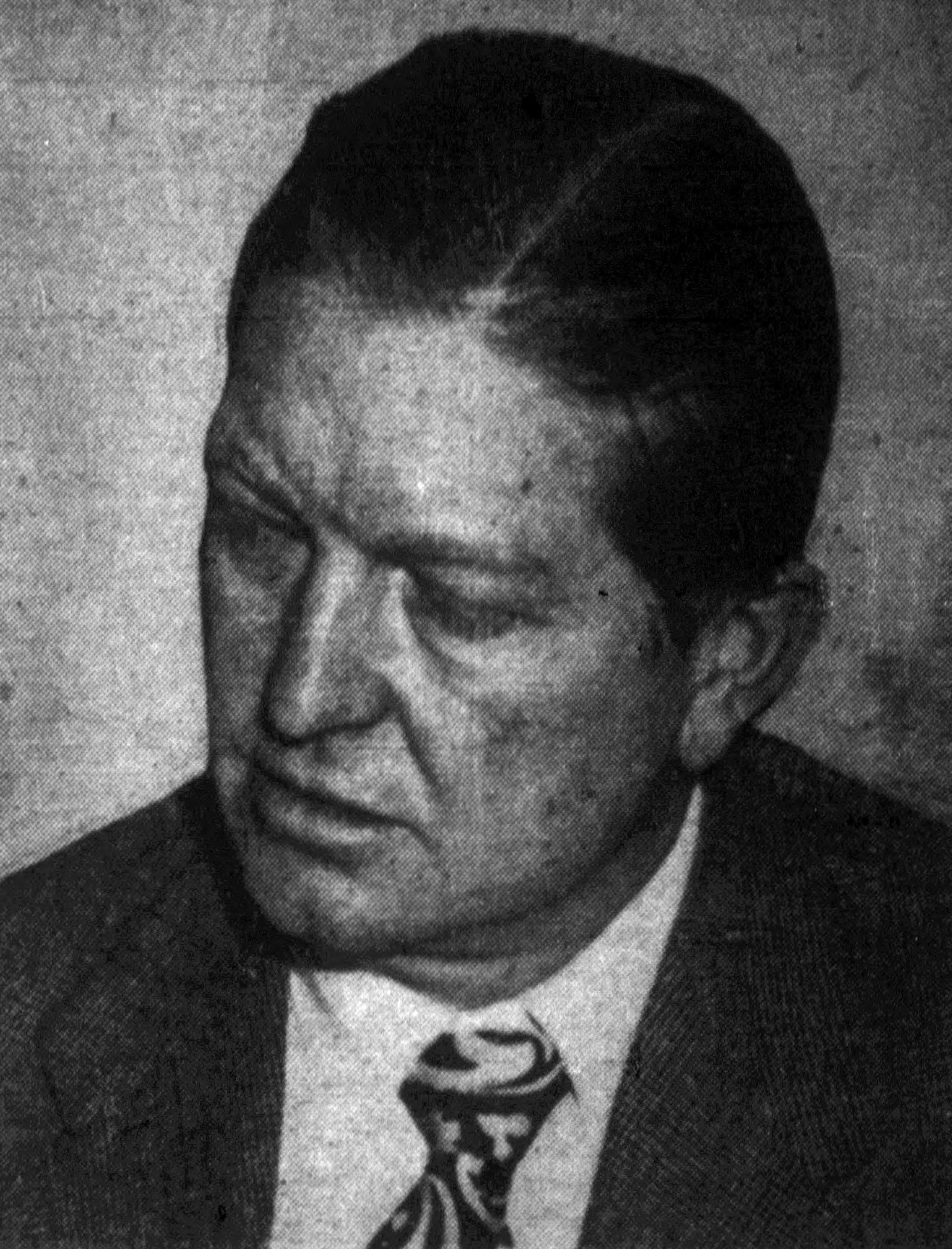
- Walsh, circa 1947

Biographical details
- Born: February 4, 1903; Des Moines, Iowa, U.S.
- Died: September 4, 1971 (aged 68); Los Angeles, California, U.S.

Playing career
- 1925–1927: Notre Dame
- Position: End

Coaching career (HC unless noted)
- 1928–1929: Saint Louis (assistant)
- 1930–1933: Saint Louis
- 1934: St. Louis Gunners
- 1942: Cleveland Rams (assistant)

Administrative career (AD unless noted)
- 1944–1945: Cleveland Rams (GM)
- 1946: Los Angeles Rams (GM)

Head coaching record
- Overall: 22–9–2 (college); 1–2 (NFL)

Charles Francis "Chile" Walsh (February 4, 1903 – September 4, 1971) was an American football player, coach, and executive. He played college football at the University of Notre Dame from 1925 to 1927 and served as the head football coach at Saint Louis University from 1930 to 1933, compiling record of 22–9–2. Walsh was a head coach in the National Football League for the St. Louis Gunners in 1934, tallying a mark of 1–2. He was also an assistant coach for the Cleveland Rams in 1942 and was named the team's head coach in 1943, however the team suspended operations that season due to manning shortages brought on by World War II.

In 1944, Walsh became the team's general manager and named Aldo Donelli as head coach. However, by 1945 Donelli had joined the military, and Walsh replaced him with his older brother, Adam, as the team's new head coach. The Rams won the NFL Championship in 1945. Just before the 1945 NFL Championship Game against the Washington Redskins, Walsh paid $7,200 for 9,000 bales of hay to prevent the field at Cleveland Stadium from freezing over. A year later the team relocated to Los Angeles, California. Walsh signed Kenny Washington, one of the first African Americans to play in the National Football League after World War II. Both Walshes left the Rams after the 1946 season.

== Head coaching record ==
=== College ===
Year	Team	Overall	Conference	Standing	Bowl/playoffs
Saint Louis Billikens (Independent) (1930–1933)
1930	Saint Louis	3–3–2			
1931	Saint Louis	8–1			
1932	Saint Louis	5–2			
1933	Saint Louis	6–3			
Saint Louis:		22–9–2			
Total:		22–9–2			
