= Jim Gillette (American football) =

American football player (1917–1990)

- Gillette in the 1945 NFL Championship Game

No. 9, 24, 11, 16
- Position: Halfback

Personal information
- Born: December 19, 1917; Courtland, Virginia, U.S.
- Died: January 9, 1990 (aged 72); Richmond, Virginia, U.S.
- Listed height: 6 ft 1 in (1.85 m)
- Listed weight: 185 lb (84 kg)

Career information
- High school: Courtland
- College: Virginia (1936-1939)
- NFL draft: 1940: 18th round, 169th overall pick

Career history
- Cleveland Rams (1940, 1944–1945); Boston Yanks (1946); Green Bay Packers (1947); Detroit Lions (1948)

Awards and highlights
- NFL champion (1945)

Career NFL statistics
- Rushing yards: 831
- Rushing average: 4.8
- Receptions: 24
- Receiving yards: 376
- Total touchdowns: 6
- Stats at Pro Football Reference

James Thomas Gillette Jr. (December 19, 1917 – January 9, 1990) was a professional American football halfback in the National Football League (NFL). Born in Courtland, Virginia, he played for six seasons with the Cleveland Rams (1940, 1944–1945), the Boston Yanks (1946), the Green Bay Packers (1947), and the Detroit Lions (1948).

== Biography ==
Jim Gillette was born December 19, 1917, in Courtland, Virginia.

Gillette (#24) snagged a pass for a 44-yard touchdown in the 1945 NFL Championship Game against the Washington Redskins. The points would provided the winning margin in a 15–14 game.

He was originally drafted by the Green Bay Packers in 1940 but signed with the Cleveland Rams for six seasons before going back to Green Bay in 1946.

In 1983, Gillette was inducted into the Virginia Sports Hall of Fame.

Gillette died January 9, 1990, in Richmond, Virginia. He was 72 years old at the time of his death.

His son, Walker Gillette, also played in the NFL.
