= Pat West (American football) =

American football player (1923–1996)

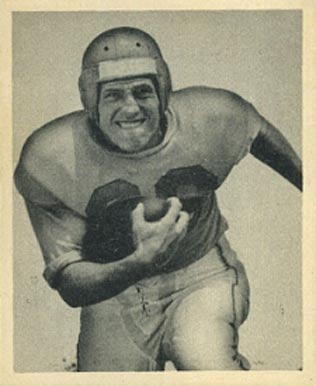
- West on a 1948 Bowman football card

No. 36, 25
- Position: Fullback

Personal information
- Born: February 21, 1923; Florence, Pennsylvania, U.S.
- Died: February 7, 1996 (aged 72); Winston-Salem, North Carolina, U.S.
- Listed height: 6 ft 0 in (1.83 m)
- Listed weight: 210 lb (95 kg)

Career information
- College: USC
- NFL draft: 1945: 28th round, 290th overall pick

Career history
- Cleveland/Los Angeles Rams (1945–1948); Green Bay Packers (1948); Edmonton Eskimos (1949)

Awards and highlights
- NFL champion (1945)

Career NFL statistics
- Rushing yards: 457
- Rushing average: 4.4
- Receptions: 4
- Receiving yards: 35
- Kick Return yards: 70
- Total touchdowns: 3
- Stats at Pro Football Reference

Pat West (February 21, 1923 – February 7, 1996) was a former fullback in the National Football League (NFL). He was drafted in the 28th round of the 1945 NFL draft by the Cleveland Rams. He played with the team for three seasons and part of another, including during the franchise's move to Los Angeles, California, before playing the last part of his career with the Green Bay Packers.
