= Ralph Ruthstrom =

American football player (1921–1962)

No. 26
- Position: Running back / Defensive back

Personal information
- Born: July 12, 1921; Schenectady, New York, U.S.
- Died: March 29, 1962 (aged 40); Houston, Texas, U.S.
- Listed height: 6 ft 5 in (1.96 m)
- Listed weight: 212 lb (96 kg)

Career information
- High school: Milby (TX)
- College: Southern Methodist

Career history
- Cleveland/Los Angeles Rams (1945–1946); Washington Redskins (1947); Baltimore Colts (1949)

Awards and highlights
- NFL champion (1945)
- Stats at Pro Football Reference

Ralph David Ruthstrom (July 12, 1921 – March 29, 1962) was an American football running back and defensive back in the National Football League (NFL) for the Washington Redskins and the Cleveland / Los Angeles Rams. Ruthstrom also played in the All-America Football Conference (AAFC) for the Baltimore Colts. He attended Sam Houston State University and Southern Methodist University.
