= John Koniszewski =

American football player (1921–2003)

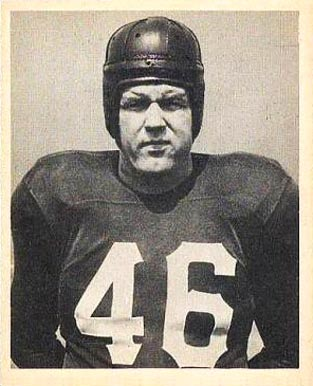
- Koniszewski on a 1948 Bowman football card

No. 49
- Position: Tackle

Personal information
- Born: August 29, 1921; Dickson City, Pennsylvania, US
- Died: December 30, 2003 (aged 82)

Career information
- College: George Washington

Career history
- 1945–1946, 1948: Washington Redskins
- Stats at Pro Football Reference

John Edward Koniszewski (August 29, 1921 – December 30, 2003) was an American football and baseball player and coach of football and basketball. He also served in the United States Marine Corps during World War II and received the Purple Heart medal for injuries sustained in the Battle of Saipan.

== Early life ==
Koniszewski was born in 1921 in Dickson City, Pennsylvania, and attended Dickson City High School where he played football, basketball, and baseball. He attended George Washington University in Washington, DC, from 1939 to 1943. He graduated with a bachelor's degree in education and again played football, basketball, and baseball. He received All-Southern Conference honors in football and basketball.

== Professional athlete and military service (1943–1948) ==
He briefly played professional baseball for the Scranton Red Sox during the summer of 1943. Koniszewski then served as a lieutenant in the United States Marine Corps during World War II. During the Battle of Saipan, he was struck in the shoulder by Japanese machine-gun fire. He reportedly returned to the battle after receiving medial treatment and "a brief rest."

After the war, Koniszewski played professional football as a tackle in the National Football League (NFL) for the Washington Redskins during the 1945, 1946, and 1948 season. He appeared in 27 NFL games, 14 as a starter. He played in the 1945 NFL championship game, which the Redskins lost to the Cleveland Rams. His top salary while playing in the NFL was $5,000. He did not play for the Redskins in 1947 in order to run for Lackawanna County Sheriff, though he did play one game for the Wilkes-Barre Barons of the American Football League in 1947.

== Coaching career ==
After his playing career ended, Koniszewski worked for 18 years as a coach at the University of Scranton. He began as an assistant football coach for 12 years and also as freshman basketball coach. He also received a master's degree in education at the University of Scranton. He became Scranton's head football coach in 1964. He also served as Scranton's head basketball coach for one year.

== Family and later years ==
Koniszewski was married for 53 years to Theresa Lagvanec. After his coaching career ended, he was the athletic and recreation director at Clarks Summit State Hospital for 34 years. He died in 2003 at his home in Peckville, Pennsylvania.
