= Bob DeFruiter =

American football player (1918–2000)

No. 61
- Position: Halfback

Personal information
- Born: June 3, 1918; Smithfield, Nebraska
- Died: January 12, 2000 (aged 81)

Career information
- College: Nebraska

Career history
- 1945–1947: Washington Redskins
- 1947: Detroit Lions
- 1948: Los Angeles Rams

Robert Albert DeFruiter (June 3, 1918 – January 12, 2000) was an American football halfback in the National Football League for the Washington Redskins, the Detroit Lions, and the Los Angeles Rams. He played college football at the University of Nebraska.
