= Leo Presley =

American football player (1922–1975)

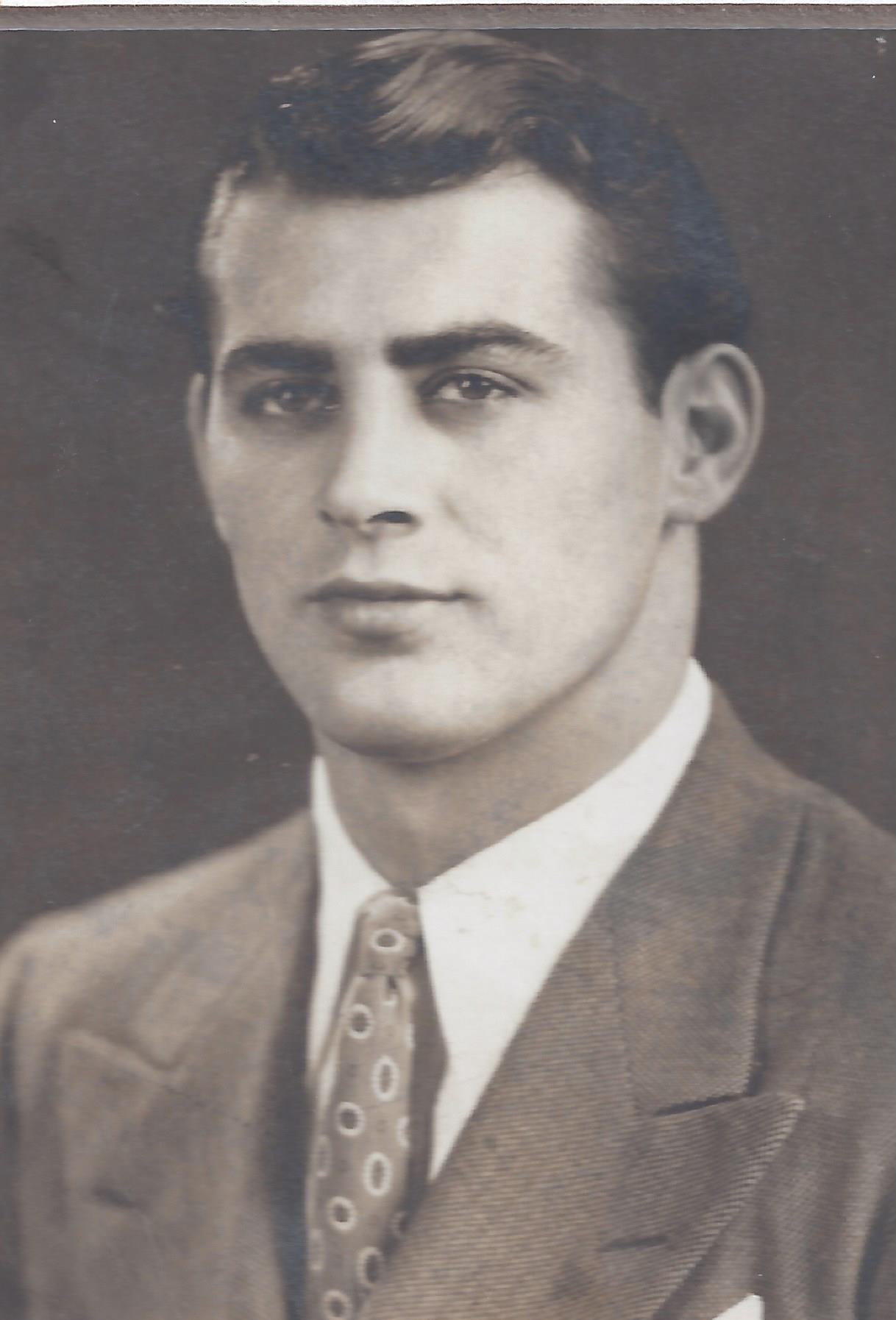

No. 48
- Positions: Center, fullback

Personal information
- Born: March 16, 1922; El Campo, Texas
- Died: September 1975 (age 53)

Career information
- College: Oklahoma

Career history
- 1945: Washington Redskins
- Stats at Pro Football Reference

Leo Grady Presley (March 16, 1922 – September 1975) was an American football center and fullback in the National Football League and started several games for the Washington Redskins. He played college football at the University of Oklahoma. He was an assistant coach for the Midwest City Bombers, under Jake Spann. He was the very first head football coach at Del City High School, in 1953-the year the school opened. He compiled a record of 30 wins and 20 losses, including a win over Midwest City in the first-ever rivalry game between the two schools. He left Del City in 1957.
