= Joe Aguirre =

American football player (1918–1985)

- Aguirre in 1946

No. 19, 57, 59, 60, 77, 78
- Position: End

Personal information
- Born: October 17, 1918; Rock Springs, Wyoming, U.S.
- Died: July 13, 1985 (aged 66); Grass Valley, California, U.S.
- Listed height: 6 ft 4 in (1.93 m)
- Listed weight: 225 lb (102 kg)

Career information
- High school: Ogden (UT)
- College: Saint Mary's (CA) (1937-1940)
- NFL draft: 1941: 11th round, 100th overall pick

Career history

Playing
- Washington Redskins (1941, 1943–1945); Los Angeles Dons (1946-1949); Winnipeg Blue Bombers (1950–1951); Edmonton Eskimos (1952); Saskatchewan Roughriders (1953–1955)

Coaching
- Winnipeg Blue Bombers (1951) Assistant coach; Edmonton Eskimos (1952) Line coach; Saskatchewan Roughriders (1953-1955) Assistant coach

Awards and highlights
- First-team All-Pro (1944); 2× Dave Dryburgh Memorial Trophy winner (1950, 1954); 2× CFL All Star (1950, 1952)

Career NFL + AAFC statistics
- Receptions: 163
- Receiving yards: 2,223
- Field goals made: 17
- Field goal attempts: 39
- Field goal %: 43.6
- Stats at Pro Football Reference

Joseph Andrew Aguirre (October 17, 1918 – July 13, 1985) was an American football end. He played collegiately at Saint Mary's College of California and was drafted in the eleventh round of the 1941 NFL draft by the Washington Redskins.

Joe Aguirre (top left) on the program for a November 2, 1947 game with the rival San Francisco 49ers.

In addition to playing in the National Football League (NFL) in 1941 and again from 1943 to 1945 for the Redskins, Aguirre played for four years with the Los Angeles Dons of the All-America Football Conference (AAFC).

He also spent time in the Canadian Football League with the Winnipeg Blue Bombers, Edmonton Eskimos, and Saskatchewan Roughriders. In his time in the CFL, he won the Dave Dryburgh Memorial Trophy as the Western Interprovincial Football Union's Top Scorer in 1950 and again in 1954.

== NFL/AAFC career statistics ==
Legend
**Bold**	Career high

=== Regular season ===
Year	Team	Games		Receiving				
Year	Team	GP	GS	Rec	Yds	Avg	Lng	TD
1941	WAS	10	1	10	103	10.3	17	2
1943	WAS	10	10	37	420	11.4	44	7
1944	WAS	10	10	34	410	12.1	58	4
1945	WAS	10	9	16	189	11.8	28	0
1946	LAD	14	9	14	246	17.6	**68**	2
1947	LAD	12	6	11	219	**19.9**	51	5
1948	LAD	13	4	**38**	**599**	15.8	67	**9**
1949	LAD	4	0	3	37	12.3	-	1
		83	49	163	2,223	13.6	68	30

=== Playoffs ===
Year	Team	Games		Receiving				
Year	Team	GP	GS	Rec	Yds	Avg	Lng	TD
1943	WAS	2	2	3	46	15.3	25	1
		2	2	3	46	15.3	25	1
