= Zip Hanna =

American football player (1916–2001)

No. 39
- Position: Guard

Personal information
- Born: December 1, 1916; Chester, South Carolina, U.S.
- Died: January 18, 2001 (aged 84); Asheville, North Carolina, U.S.

Career information
- College: South Carolina

Career history
- 1945: Washington Redskins

Elzaphan McConnell "Zip" Hanna (December 1, 1916 – January 18, 2001) was an American football guard in the National Football League for the Washington Redskins, wearing jersey #37. Hanna attended Chester High School in Chester, South Carolina as well as Gaffney High School in Gaffney, SC. Hanna was invited to play in the first S.C.-N.C. Shrine Bowl, but rejected the invitation as Gaffney was playing for the Southeastern Football Championship. He played college football at the University of South Carolina, and served in the United States Navy during World War II prior to joining the Redskins. In 1946, suffering from knee injuries, he became a player-coach of the Charlotte Clippers semi-pro team.

In the latter part of 1946, he became chief of police in Rock Hill, South Carolina. In 1955, he accepted the position of chief of police in Aiken, SC, from which he retired. After retiring, he moved to the Piedmont area and formed a home builders group. Hanna died in January 2001 at the VA Hospital in Asheville, North Carolina.
