= Damon Wetzel =

American football player and coach (1910–1985)

Damon "Buzz" Wetzel
No. 10
- Positions: Fullback; Head coach; General manager

Personal information
- Born: November 7, 1910; Roseville, Ohio, U.S.
- Died: October 15, 1985 (aged 74); El Paso, Texas, U.S.

Career information
- College: Ohio State

Career history

Playing
- Chicago Bears (1935); Pittsburgh Pirates (1935)

Coaching
- Cleveland Rams (1936); Cleveland Rams (1937–1938) GM

Head coaching record
- Career: 5–2–2
- Coaching profile at Pro Football Reference

Damon "Buzz" Wetzel (November 7, 1910 – October 15, 1985) was an American fullback for Ohio State, the Chicago Bears and the Pittsburgh Pirates. He was also the first head coach of the Cleveland Rams when they played in the American Football League, then general manager of the Rams (1937–38) after they entered the National Football League. He was instrumental in the founding of the still-existing franchise, ninth oldest in the NFL, after leaving his post-college job as a newspaper illustrator. He also was responsible for naming it "Rams", in honor of Fordham, his favorite college team, and because the name was short enough to fit easily into a newspaper headline.

In 1938, after the Rams opened with three straight losses following a 1–10 inaugural season in the NFL, both Wetzel and Hugo Bezdek, whom he had hired to succeed him as head coach, were fired by Rams management. In 1939 Wetzel became general manager of the Mansfield Braves, class D minor league team to the baseball Cleveland Indians. In the early 1940s he served in the U.S. Navy during World War II.

== Head coaching record ==
| Team | Year | Regular season | | | | | Postseason | | | |
| Team | Year | Won | Lost | Ties | Win % | Finish | Won | Lost | Win % | Result |
|---|---|---|---|---|---|---|---|---|---|---|
| CLE | 1936 | 5 | 2 | 2 | .667 | 2nd in AFL | – | – | – | – |
| CLE Total | | 5 | 2 | 2 | .667 | | – | – | – | – |
| Total | | 5 | 2 | 2 | .667 | | – | – | – | – |
