= Dan Reeves (American football executive) =

American football executive, owner

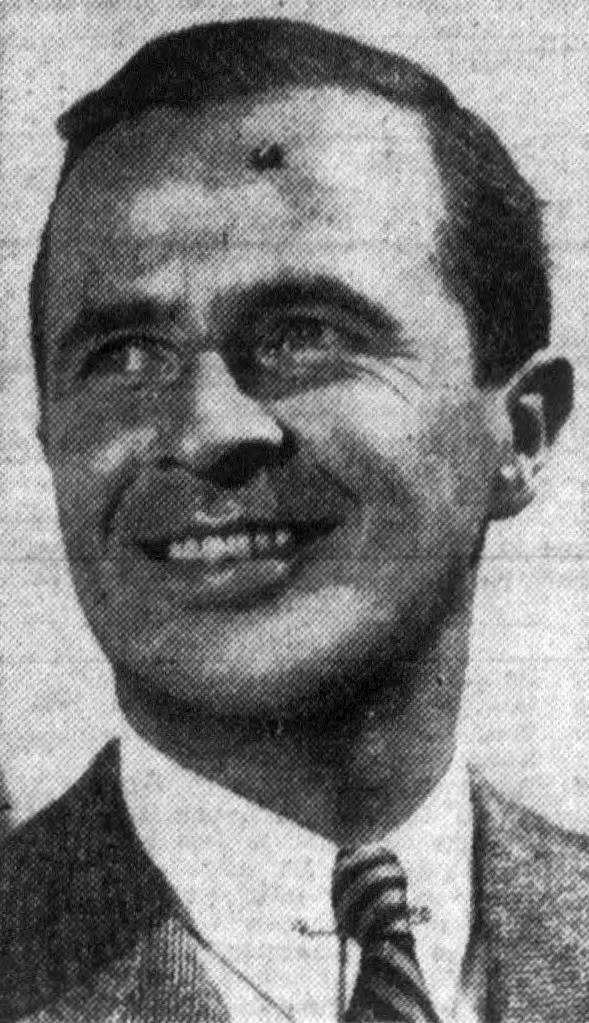
- Reeves, c. 1954
- Born: Daniel Farrell Reeves; June 30, 1912; New York City, U.S.
- Died: April 15, 1971 (aged 58); New York City, U.S.
- Resting place: Gate of Heaven Cemetery (Hawthorne, New York)
- Education: Georgetown University (no degree)
- Occupations: businessman and sports entrepreneur
- Known for: Owner of the NFL's Cleveland/Los Angeles Rams franchise, 1941–1971
- Spouse: Mary V. Corroon Reeves (m.1935–1971, his death)
- Children: 6

Daniel Farrell Reeves (June 30, 1912 – April 15, 1971) was an American sports entrepreneur, best known as the owner of the Los Angeles Rams of the National Football League (NFL). He owned the franchise when it was operating in Cleveland, Ohio, in 1941. He owned the team until his death in 1971.

Reeves is remembered for his move of the Rams from Cleveland to Los Angeles in 1946, where it became the first American major league sports franchise on the Pacific Coast. He was also the first NFL owner to sign a black player in the post World War II era, inking deals with halfback Kenny Washington and end Woody Strode in 1946, as well as being the first to employ a full-time scouting staff.

Reeves was inducted into the Pro Football Hall of Fame in 1967.

== Early life and college ==
He was born in New York City to Irish immigrants James Reeves and Rose Farrell, who, along with an uncle, Daniel, had risen together from fruit peddlers to owners of a grocery-store chain, bringing wealth to the family.

Reeves was a graduate of the Newman School in Lakewood, New Jersey, and attended Georgetown University in Washington, D.C., which he left before acquiring his degree. While attending Georgetown, Reeves met his future wife, Mary V. Corroon. The couple were married on October 25, 1935, and had six children.

The Reeves family's grocery chain was sold to Safeway Stores in 1941, generating capital and freeing the youthful Dan Reeves, age 29, to pursue his dream of owning a professional football franchise.

== Purchase of Cleveland Rams ==
Together with his friend and business partner Robert Levy, Reeves purchased the Cleveland Rams franchise in 1941 from a local ownership group for $135,000. The team was a comparatively young one, launched in 1936, and finances were tight, with as few as 200 season ticket holders and no television revenue, forcing some players to work for as little as $100 per game. The team did not operate in 1943, and Reeves became the sole owner in December, while serving stateside in the U.S. Army Air Forces.

Despite its financial woes, the previously unsuccessful franchise began to turn around in 1944; the Rams won the Western division title in 1945 and the championship game behind rookie quarterback and league MVP Bob Waterfield, a future member of the Pro Football Hall of Fame.

== Move to Los Angeles ==
Immediately following the conclusion of the 1945 season, with the championship game having been played in icy Cleveland before 32,000 fans on December 15, Reeves announced his intention to move his team to sunny Southern California: the League approved the move on January 12, 1946. He had actually considered moving to Los Angeles not long after buying the team; it appeared that he only stayed in Cleveland because wartime travel restrictions made major-league sports on the West Coast unviable.

Reeves cited five years of losses, including $64,000 in 1945. His bottom line wasn't helped by poor attendance; despite winning the league title, the Rams had the second-lowest attendance in the league, behind only their rival Chicago Cardinals. Even without that to consider, Reeves knew he would have faced an uphill battle against the Cleveland Browns of the upstart All-America Football Conference. The Browns' owner, taxicab and real estate magnate Mickey McBride, had more resources than Reeves could even begin to match. Additionally, the Browns were coached by former Ohio State head coach Paul Brown, a long-respected figure in Ohio coaching circles, and had a roster laden with Ohio collegiate stars. It appeared that the Browns were the only AAFC team that even potentially had a chance of chasing their NFL rivals out of town.

On January 15, Rams team representatives went before the Los Angeles Coliseum Commission with a plan to lease use of the facility for home games, as it was already the home venue for college football for both UCLA and USC of the Pacific Coast Conference. On January 23, the Coliseum Commission approved use of the 103,000-seat stadium for Rams' Sunday home games during the 1946 season. The move did not immediately cure the team's financial woes, however: in 1947, Reeves found himself in need of co-owners to share the mounting losses while attempting a turnaround. Reeves brought Levy back in for a one-third stake in the team, while another third went to Edwin Pauley and Hal Saley.

Eventually, the team proved to be extremely successful on the field, with quarterback Bob Waterfield helping the team to three straight League Championship games from 1949 to 1951, culminating in the 1951 Championship trophy. Boasting some of football's most glamorous stars, the Rams drew extremely well at the ticket office. Topped by a crowd of 102,368 for game against the San Francisco 49ers in 1957, attendance for Rams games in the Los Angeles Memorial Coliseum topped 80,000 on 22 occasions during the teams' first two decades in California.

The previous closeness between Reeves and Levy fell away, though, and soon Levy was siding with Pauley against Reeves on most significant ownership decisions. Pauley eventually assumed Levy's stake, giving Pauley two-thirds ownership of the team but that did nothing to resolve the constant battles between Pauley and Reeves. Finally in 1962, the NFL stepped in to resolve the situation by holding a closed auction to result in one partner buying out the other. Reeves outbid Pauley for the team, valuing the Rams at $7.1 million against Pauley's bid of $6.1 million. Reeves once again assumed sole ownership.

He then raised the funds to support his bid by immediately selling 49% of the team to a group of minority owners that included Gene Autry. By the time of Reeves' death in 1971, the team's value was estimated at $20 million.

Reeves also owned one of Los Angeles' first ice hockey teams, the Western Hockey League's Los Angeles Blades, which lasted from 1961 to 1967 and played nearby the Coliseum at the Los Angeles Memorial Sports Arena. Given the Blades' success, Reeves was an early favorite to get a National Hockey League franchise during the 1967 NHL expansion, but the league awarded the team to Los Angeles Lakers owner Jack Kent Cooke.

== Innovations ==
The innovative Reeves made several other significant contributions to pro football. He instituted the famed "Free Football for Kids" program that enabled youngsters to enjoy the game in their formative years and then, hopefully, become ardent fans as adults. His signing of the ex-UCLA great, Kenny Washington, in the spring of 1946 marked the first time a black player had been hired in the NFL since 1933.

Reeves' experimentation in the early days of television provided the groundwork for pro football's current successful TV policies. He was also the first to employ a full-time scouting staff.

== Relationship with George Allen ==
In 1965, Reeves lured away defensive coordinator and head of player personnel George Allen from the Chicago Bears. Allen made key trades and draft choices, which returned the team back to prominence within the next three seasons of his tenure. Allen allegedly had agreed on the deal with Reeves with two years remaining on his contract with the Bears, and a protracted legal battle followed.

By 1968, Reeves had sought to go in a new direction as far as to find a new head coach for the team. On Christmas Day, Reeves attempted to fire Allen, but due to the wide public outcry of the Rams' fans over the dismissal, he finally relented and retained Allen as the head coach for the next two years, then fired him again after the 1970 season.

== Pro Football HOF enshrinement and death ==
Reeves was enshrined in the Pro Football Hall of Fame in 1967. For his contribution to sports in Los Angeles, he was honored with a Los Angeles Memorial Coliseum "Court of Honor" plaque by the Coliseum commissioners. A longtime smoker, Reeves's health began to deteriorate by 1969. Reeves, who was also diagnosed with Hodgkin's disease, succumbed to cancer in his New York City apartment on April 15, 1971.

After Reeves' death, Baltimore Colts owner Carroll Rosenbloom assumed control of the Rams on July 13, 1972, spinning off the Colts to Robert Irsay in a swap of franchises between the owners and their investors.

Sporting positions
| Preceded by Homer Marshman | Cleveland/Los Angeles Rams principal owner 1941–1972 | Succeeded by Robert Irsay |
