= Harland Svare =

American football player and coach (1930–2020)

No. 65, 76, 84
- Position: Linebacker

Personal information
- Born: November 15, 1930; Clarkfield, Minnesota, U.S.
- Died: April 4, 2020 (aged 89); Steamboat Springs, Colorado, U.S.
- Listed height: 6 ft 0 in (1.83 m)
- Listed weight: 214 lb (97 kg)

Career information
- High school: North Kitsap (Poulsbo, Washington)
- College: Washington State
- NFL draft: 1953: 17th round, 204th overall pick

Career history

Playing
- Los Angeles Rams (1953–1954); New York Giants (1955–1960)

Coaching
- New York Giants (1960-1961) Defensive coordinator; Los Angeles Rams (1962–1965) Head coach; New York Giants (1967–1968) Defensive coordinator; Washington Redskins (1969–1970) Defensive coordinator; San Diego Chargers (1971–1973) Head coach

Operations
- San Diego Chargers (1971-1975) General manager

Awards and highlights
- NFL champion (1956)

Career NFL statistics
- Interceptions: 9
- Fumble recoveries: 5
- Total touchdowns: 1
- Sacks: 3.5
- Stats at Pro Football Reference

Head coaching record
- Regular season: 21–48–5 (.318)
- Coaching profile at Pro Football Reference
- Executive profile at Pro Football Reference

Harland James Svare (November 25, 1930 – April 4, 2020) was an American professional football player, coach and general manager. Svare was a linebacker who played eight seasons with the Los Angeles Rams and New York Giants of the National Football League (NFL) from 1953 to 1960. He was the Rams head coach from midway the 1962 season through 1965, and the San Diego Chargers head coach from 1971 through 1973. He was general manager of the Chargers from 1971 to 1976.

Svare's coaching career began when Giants head coach Jim Lee Howell made an unconventional move when replacing Tom Landry who had left for the then-expansion Dallas Cowboys. Three active players ran the defense, with Svare as the defensive coordinator and linebackers coach and Andy Robustelli and Jimmy Patton in charge of the line and secondary respectively.

During the halftime intermission of a November 1972 game, Chargers owner Eugene V. Klein awarded Svare a five-year coaching contract, an unpopular decision; however, Svare voluntarily stepped down from the position during the following season.

== Head coaching record ==
Team	Year	Regular season					Postseason			
Team	Year	Won	Lost	Ties	Win %	Finish	Won	Lost	Win %	Result
LA	1962	0	5	1	.083	7th in NFL Western	–	–	–	–
LA	1963	5	9	0	.357	6th in NFL Western	–	–	–	–
LA	1964	5	7	2	.429	5th in NFL Western	–	–	–	–
LA	1965	4	10	0	.286	7th in NFL Western	–	–	–	–
LA total		14	31	3	.323		–	–	–	–
SD	1971	2	2	0	.500	3rd in AFC West	–	–	–	–
SD	1972	4	9	1	.321	4th in AFC West	–	–	–	–
SD	1973	1	6	1	.188	4th in AFC West	–	–	–	–
SD total		7	17	2	.308		–	–	–	–
Total		21	48	5	.318		–	–	–	–
