= Morgan, Pennsylvania =

Unincorporated community in Pennsylvania, US

- Unincorporated community
- Location within Pennsylvania
- Coordinates: 40°21′15″N 80°08′23″W
- Country: United States
- State: Pennsylvania
- County: Allegheny
- Elevation: 860 ft (260 m)
- Time zone: UTC-5 (Eastern (EST))
  - Summer (DST): UTC-4 (EDT)
- ZIP code: 15064
- Area code: 412
- GNIS feature ID: 1181544

Morgan is an unincorporated community in South Fayette Township, Pennsylvania, United States. The community is located along Pennsylvania Route 50, 9.7 miles (15.6 km) southwest of Pittsburgh. Morgan has a post office with ZIP code 15064.
