= Steve Bagarus =

American football player (1919–1981)

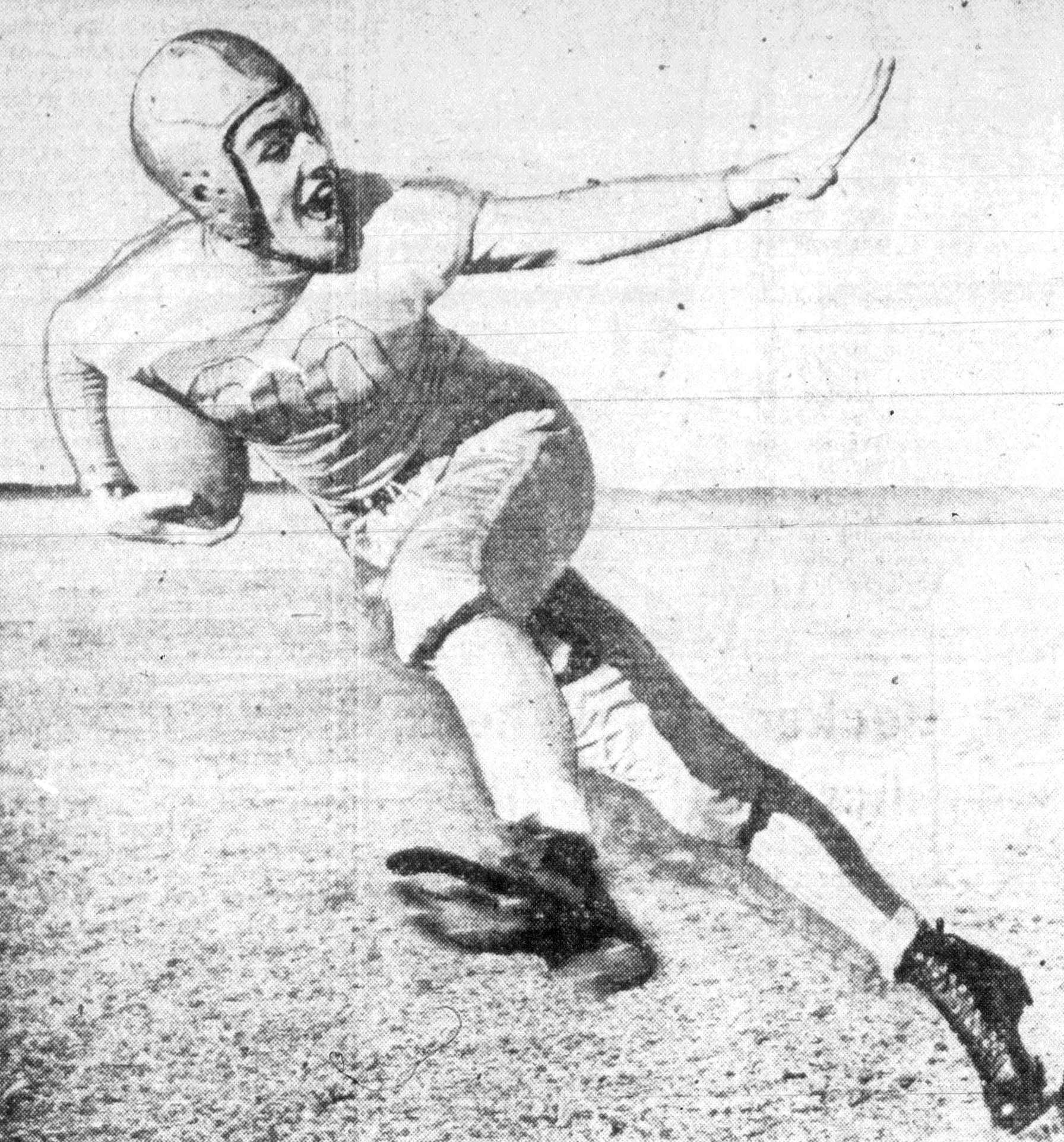
- Bagarus, circa 1944

No. 00
- Positions: Halfback, defensive back

Personal information
- Born: June 19, 1919; South Bend, Indiana, U.S.
- Died: October 17, 1981 (aged 62); Gaithersburg, Maryland, U.S.
- Listed height: 6 ft 0 in (1.83 m)
- Listed weight: 173 lb (78 kg)

Career information
- High school: Washington (South Bend)
- College: Notre Dame (1938-1940)
- NFL draft: 1945: undrafted

Career history
- San Diego Bombers (1941–1944); Washington Redskins (1945–1946); Los Angeles Rams (1947); Washington Redskins (1948); Richmond Rebels (1949)

Awards and highlights
- First-team All-Pro (1945)

Career NFL statistics
- Rushing yards: 343
- Rushing average: 3.5
- Rushing touchdowns: 1
- Receptions: 80
- Receiving yards: 1,155
- Receiving touchdowns: 9
- Return yards: 1,144
- Stats at Pro Football Reference

Stephen Michael Bagarus (September 19, 1919 – October 17, 1981) was an American professional football player who was a halfback in the National Football League (NFL) for the Washington Redskins and the Los Angeles Rams. He played college football for the Notre Dame Fighting Irish. He is one of only four NFL players who have ever worn the uniform number 00, along with Johnny Clement, Jim Otto and Ken Burrough.
