= Cleveland Rams =

US professional football team from 1936 to 1945, predecessor to Los Angeles Rams

Logo

General information
- Founded: 1936
- Stadium: League Park; Shaw Stadium; Cleveland Stadium
- Headquartered: Cleveland, Ohio
- Colors: Red, dark blue (1936–1937) Royal blue, gold (1938–1945)

Team history
- Cleveland Rams (1936–1942, 1944–1945); Suspended operations (1943); Los Angeles Rams (1946–1994, 2016–present); St. Louis Rams (1995–2015)

League / conference affiliations
- American Football League (1936); National Football League (1937–1945)

The Cleveland Rams were a professional American football team that played in Cleveland from 1936 to 1945. The Rams competed in the second American Football League (AFL) for the 1936 season and the National Football League (NFL) from 1937 to 1945, winning the NFL championship in 1945, before moving to Los Angeles in 1946 to become the first of only two professional football champions to play the following season in another city.

The move of the team to Los Angeles helped to jump-start the reintegration of pro football by African American players and opened up the West Coast to professional sports. After being based in Los Angeles for 49 years, the Rams franchise moved again after the 1994 NFL season to St. Louis where the franchise stayed for 21 seasons before moving back to Los Angeles after the 2015 NFL season.

== Early days ==
=== 1936: Founding in the AFL ===
The Rams franchise, founded in 1936 by attorney/businessman Homer Marshman and player-coach Damon "Buzz" Wetzel, was named for the then-powerhouse Fordham Rams and because the name was short and would fit easily into a newspaper headline.

Coached by Wetzel, and featuring future Hall-of-Fame coach Sid Gillman as a receiver, the team went 5–2–2 in its first season, finishing in second place, behind the Boston Shamrocks. The team might have hosted an AFL championship game at Cleveland's League Park; however, the Boston team canceled because its unpaid players refused to participate. The Rams then moved from the poorly managed AFL to the National Football League on February 13, 1937. Marshman and the other Rams stockholders paid $10,000 for an NFL franchise, then put up $55,000 to capitalize the new club, and Wetzel became general manager.

=== 1937–1943: Struggles ===
Under head coach Hugo Bezdek and with sole star Johnny Drake, the team's first-round draft pick, the Rams struggled in an era of little league parity to a 1–10 record in 1937 under heavy competition from the NFL's "big four": the Chicago Bears, Green Bay Packers, New York Giants, and the Washington Redskins. After the team dropped its first three games of 1938, Wetzel was fired, then Bezdek. Art Lewis became coach, and guided the team to four victories in its last eight games and a 4–7 record.

Future Hall-of-Famer Dutch Clark was named head coach for the 1939 season, and with Lewis as his assistant and with star back Parker Hall on the squad, the Rams improved to 5–5–1 in 1939 and 4–6–1 in 1940 before falling back to 2–9 in 1941, the year that Dan Reeves, a New Yorker with family wealth in the grocery business, acquired the team.

The Rams bounced back to 5–6 and a third-place finish in 1942, but in the heavy war year of 1943, when many NFL personnel, including Rams' majority owner Reeves, had been drafted into the military, they suspended play for one season.

=== 1944: Rebound ===
The franchise began to rebound in 1944 under the direction of general manager Chile Walsh and head coach Aldo Donelli, the only man both to participate in a FIFA World Cup game and coach an NFL team. With servicemen beginning to return home, and with the makings of a championship team that included ends Jim Benton and Steve Pritko, backs Jim Gillette and Tommy Colella, and linemen Riley Matheson and Mike Scarry, the team improved to 4–6 in 1944, defeating the Bears in League Park and the Detroit Lions in Briggs Stadium.

== 1945 NFL Champions ==
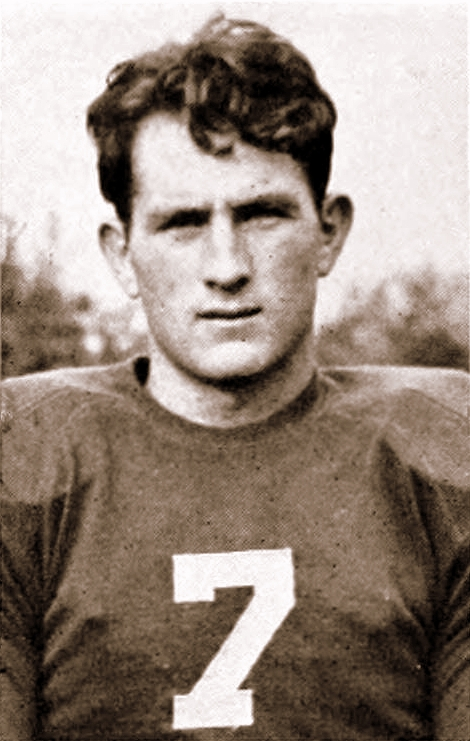
Hall of Fame quarterback Bob Waterfield led the Cleveland Rams to the 1945 NFL Championship.

With the arrival of star quarterback Bob Waterfield, the drafting of Pat West and the return of back Fred Gehrke, who would go on to create the first ever designed and painted helmet in NFL history, the team finally gelled into championship caliber. Donelli was drafted into the Navy, but Chile Walsh's brother Adam Walsh quickly took over as head coach.

Waterfield-to-Benton became an aerial threat to opposing teams, with Benton becoming the NFL's first 300-yard receiver by hauling in 10 passes for 303 yards against the Lions on Thanksgiving Day 1945. Benton's performance shattered the mark set by Green Bay Packers legend Don Hutson (237 yards) two years earlier in a game against the Brooklyn Dodgers. The record stood for a remarkable 40 years, until it was broken by the Kansas City Chiefs' Stephone Paige in 1985. It still stands as the fourth-most receiving yards in a single game.

The only loss on the Rams' 9–1 regular-season record came against the Philadelphia Eagles. Otherwise Cleveland plowed through the powers that had held a championship hegemony in the NFL since the early 1930s—the Bears, Giants, Packers, and Lions—and defeated the Washington Redskins, 15–14, in the 1945 NFL Championship Game in near-zero degree weather at Cleveland Stadium.

The Rams, led by Waterfield, who was married to Hollywood star Jane Russell, were described as "sport's first spectacular postwar team."

== Move to Los Angeles ==
One month after winning the championship, Reeves overcame the objections of his fellow NFL owners, and announced he would move the Rams to Los Angeles. He cited five years of financial losses, including $64,000 in 1945, and poor home attendance in Cleveland: the Rams had finished second-to-last in home attendance in 1945, ahead only of the long-struggling Cardinals. Even the championship game, played in sub-zero weather, had drawn a crowd of less than half capacity.

Reeves had also realized his Rams would not be able to compete in the Cleveland market against the incoming Cleveland Browns of the All-America Football Conference. The Browns not only had an owner (taxi-cab and real estate baron Mickey McBride) with far more resources than Reeves could ever hope to match, but they would have many Ohio players on their roster, and they would be coached by Paul Brown, a legendary former Ohio State head coach.

In all likelihood, the only thing that had kept the team in Cleveland until 1945 was wartime travel restrictions, which had been eased with the end of hostilities. Reeves had an eye on the booming and much warmer Los Angeles market since he had bought the team in 1941.

The Rams' move opened the Cleveland market to the new Browns, who would be highly successful over the next decade. In the NFL, they won seven championships with ten consecutive championship game appearances between 1946 and 1955, including five championships in succession in 1946–1950.

At the same time, the Rams and their 1945 championship were soon forgotten in Cleveland, in part due to a month-long citywide newspaper strike that paralleled the team's departure. The strike not only delayed coverage, but also muted any public outcry, which was further mollified by the immediate replacement of the Rams with a team under the popular Brown, despite the fact it would be playing in a fledgling upstart league.

Once in Los Angeles, the Rams were required to integrate their team with African-American players as a condition to rent the Los Angeles Memorial Coliseum. In doing so, the Rams (along with the Cleveland Browns) reintegrated pro football after 20 years. Reeves' move also opened up the west coast to pro sports teams, including westward moves of five franchises and the awarding of expansion teams in California and Los Angeles in the major pro sports leagues.

== Notable players ==
=== Hall of Famers ===
Cleveland Rams Hall of Famers
Players
No.	Name	Inducted	Position(s)	Tenure
7	Bob Waterfield	1965	QB, DB, K, P	1945
Coaches and Contributors
Name		Inducted	Position(s)	Tenure
Dan Reeves		1967	Owner	1941–1945

=== Retired numbers ===
Cleveland Rams retired numbers
No.	Player	Position	Tenure	Retired
7	Bob Waterfield	QB	1945	1952
