= Aldo Donelli =

American sportsman and administrator (1907–1994)

- Donelli in a United States's jersey

Profile
- Positions: Halfback, Punter

Personal information
- Born: July 22, 1907; Morgan, Pennsylvania, U.S.
- Died: August 9, 1994 (aged 87); Fort Lauderdale, Florida, U.S.
- Listed height: 5 ft 8 in (1.73 m)

Career information
- College: Duquesne

Career history
- 1930–1935: Duquesne (freshmen)
- 1936–1938: Duquesne (assistant)
- 1939–1942: Duquesne
- 1941: Pittsburgh Steelers
- 1944: Cleveland Rams
- 1947–1956: Boston University
- 1957–1967: Columbia

Awards and highlights
- College coaching record: 105–107–8; NFL coaching record: 4–11
- Coaching profile at Pro Football Reference

Other information
- Military career
- Allegiance: United States
- Branch: U.S. Navy
- Service years: 1945
- Conflicts: World War II
Association football career
Senior career*
Years	Team	Apps	(Gls)
1925	Morgan F.C.		
1929–1930	Cleveland Slavia		
1934	Curry Silver Tops		
1936	Heidelberg SC		
1938	Castle Shannon SC		
International career
1934	United States	2	(5)
- * Club domestic league appearances and goals

Aldo Teo "Buff" Donelli (July 22, 1907 – August 9, 1994) was an American football player and coach, soccer player, and college athletics administrator. He served as the head football coach at Duquesne University from 1939 to 1942, Boston University from 1947 to 1956, and Columbia University from 1957 to 1967, compiling a career college football coaching record of 105–107–8. Donelli was also a head coach in the National Football League (NFL), with the Pittsburgh Steelers for part of the 1941 season and with the Cleveland Rams in 1944, tallying a career mark of 4–11 in the NFL. From 1951 to 1955 he was the athletic director at Boston University. Donelli played college football at Duquesne and was an assistant football coach at his alma mater from 1930 to 1938, before being promoted to head coach. He played soccer with a number of clubs in the 1920s and 1930s and was a member of the United States men's national soccer team during the 1934 FIFA World Cup. He is a member of the National Soccer Hall of Fame.

== Soccer ==
=== Club ===
In 1925, Donelli played for Morgan F.C., a western Pennsylvania soccer team. At some point, he moved to Cleveland Slavia, playing for them at least the winter of 1929–30. In January and February 1934, he is listed with Curry Silver Tops and then Heidelberg SC from February to April 1936. He also played for Castle Shannon in March 1938.

=== National team ===
Donelli was selected to the United States 1934 FIFA World Cup team. In a 4–2 qualifying victory over Mexico in Rome, Italy on May 24, he tallied all four times, becoming the first American to score his first three international goals with the senior team in the same match (Sacha Kljestan would become the second to achieve this feat on January 24, 2009). Three days later in the same stadium, Donelli scored the lone U.S. goal in its 7–1 first-round elimination loss to Italy. It would be the last one any American scored on Italian turf for another 56 years, and also the only Italian American to score against Italy. He was inducted into U.S. National Soccer Hall of Fame in 1954.

== Football ==
=== College ===
Donelli, who played college football at Duquesne University in Pittsburgh, Pennsylvania, was a halfback and punter. He went on to coach Duquesne University, Columbia University, Boston University, and the Pittsburgh Steelers and Cleveland Rams of the National Football League.

=== Duquesne, NFL ===
Donelli took over as Duquesne head coach in 1939, compiling a 29–4–2 record as the Dukes finished in the top ten twice in four seasons. His tenure at his alma mater also gave him a place in the history books as the only man to serve as head coach of both a college and NFL team simultaneously. Donelli served as head coach of the Pittsburgh Steelers during the 1941 fall campaign on the bluff of Duquesne University. The Dukes were on their way to an undefeated season in 1941 and after the Steelers lost their first two games, coach (and later NFL Commissioner) Bert Bell resigned, having Donelli replace him. Aldo would coach the Steelers in the morning during classes at Duquesne University and then the Dukes in the afternoon. Although his college team finished undefeated, the Steelers lost all five games under Donelli. He also coached the Cleveland Rams for a single season (1944), attaining a 4–6 record.

=== Boston University and Columbia ===
Donelli continued on to coach at Boston University from 1947 to 1956 with a 46–34–4 record and again placing a season in the top 25 poll. In 1957, he was named the head coach at Columbia University where he would serve until 1967 compiling a 30–76–4 record. In 1961, he coached Columbia to its only Ivy League championship.

== Other accomplishments ==
Donelli was a founding member of Alpha Phi Delta, Psi chapter, the national Italian heritage fraternity, at Duquesne University on March 19, 1929. Donelli received his business degree from Duquesne University in 1930 and his graduate business degree in 1931.

Donelli was drafted into the United States Navy for a short time during the last year of World War II. In the late 1960s and throughout the 1970s after semi-retiring from coaching, he worked in public relations for PGA events around Boston while keeping homes in suburban Pittsburgh and then eventually Florida.

== Honors ==
Columbia University's weight room is named in Donelli's honor.

== Head coaching record ==
=== College ===
Year	Team	Overall	Conference	Standing	Bowl/playoffs	AP^{#}
Duquesne Dukes (Independent) (1939–1942)
1939	Duquesne	8–0–1				10
1940	Duquesne	7–1				
1941	Duquesne	8–0				8
1942	Duquesne	6–3–1				
Duquesne:		29–4–2				
Boston University Terriers (Independent) (1947–1956)
1947	Boston University	5–3				
1948	Boston University	6–2				
1949	Boston University	6–2				
1950	Boston University	3–5				
1951	Boston University	6–4				16
1952	Boston University	5–4–1				
1953	Boston University	5–3–1				
1954	Boston University	7–2				
1955	Boston University	2–6				
1956	Boston University	1–5–2				
Boston University:		46–36–4				
Columbia Lions (Ivy League) (1957–1967)
1957	Columbia	1–8	1–6	8th		
1958	Columbia	1–8	1–6	7th		
1959	Columbia	2–7	1–6	8th		
1960	Columbia	3–6	3–4	5th		
1961	Columbia	6–3	6–1	T–1st		
1962	Columbia	5–4	4–3	T–3rd		
1963	Columbia	4–4–1	2–4–1	6th		
1964	Columbia	2–6–1	1–5–1	7th		
1965	Columbia	2–7	1–6	T–7th		
1966	Columbia	2–7	1–6	7th		
1967	Columbia	2–7	0–7	8th		
Columbia:		30–67–2	21–54–2			
Total:		105–107–8				
National championship Conference title Conference division title or championship game berth
^{#}Rankings from final AP Poll.

=== Professional ===
Team	Year	Regular season					Postseason			
Team	Year	Won	Lost	Ties	Win %	Finish	Won	Lost	Win %	Result
PIT	1941	0	5	0	.000	5th in NFL Eastern	–	–	–	–
PIT Total		0	5	0	.000		–	–	–	–
CLE	1944	4	6	0	.400	4th in NFL Western	–	–	–	–
CLE Total		4	6	0	.400		–	–	–	–
NFL Total		4	11	0	.267		–	–	–	–
Total		4	11	0	.267		–	–	–	–
