= Adam Walsh (American football) =

American football player and coach (1901–1985)

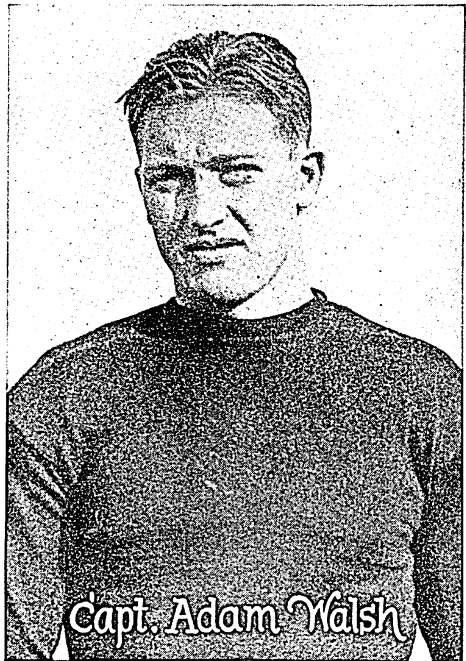
- Walsh in 1924

Biographical details
- Born: December 4, 1901; Churchville, Iowa, U.S.
- Died: January 13, 1985 (aged 83); Los Angeles, California, U.S.

Playing career
- 1922–1924: Notre Dame
- Position: Center

Coaching career (HC unless noted)
- 1925–1928: Santa Clara
- 1929–1933: Yale (line)
- 1934: Harvard (line)
- 1935–1942: Bowdoin
- 1944: Harvard (line)
- 1945–1946: Cleveland/LA Rams
- 1947–1958: Bowdoin

Head coaching record
- Overall: 80–85–11 (college); 15–5–1 (NFL)

Accomplishments and honors

Championships
- As coach: NFL (1945); 11 MIAA (1935–1940, 1942, 1948–1950, 1952); As player: National (1924)

Awards
- Second-team All-American (1924)
- College Football Hall of Fame; Inducted in 1968 (profile)

Adam Walsh (December 4, 1901 – January 13, 1985) was an American football player and coach. He played college football as a center at the University of Notre Dame where he was an All-American and captain of the 1924 team under Knute Rockne. Walsh then served as the head football coach at Santa Clara University from 1925 to 1928 and at Bowdoin College from 1935 to 1942 and again from 1947 to 1958, compiling a career college football record of 80–85–11. He also coached the Cleveland / Los Angeles Rams of the National Football League (NFL) in 1945 and 1946, tallying a mark of 15–5–1. Walsh was inducted into the College Football Hall of Fame as a player in 1968.

== Playing career ==
Walsh was an outstanding athlete at Hollywood High School in Los Angeles, and earned varsity letters in basketball, track, and football at the University of Notre Dame. Walsh was an All-American center and captain of the 1924 Notre Dame football team under head coach Knute Rockne. Walsh anchored the team's offensive line, dubbed the "Seven Mules," who blocked for the famed "Four Horsemen" backfield. The 1924 team completed an undefeated season with a win over Stanford in the Rose Bowl. Walsh played every minute of the game against Army in 1924 with two broken hands, never missed a single snap of the ball, was involved in 75 percent of the tackles on defense, and intercepted a pass in the final minutes of the game to preserve a Notre Dame victory. He remains the offensive center on the All-time Notre Dame Team.

== Coaching career ==
Walsh served as head football coach and athletic director at Santa Clara University from 1925 to 1928. He then spent five seasons as the line coach at Yale University, and one season at Harvard University in the same capacity. In 1935, Walsh accepted the head coaching position at Bowdoin College in Brunswick, Maine. Though Bowdoin had been winless the prior year, Walsh began his 20-year coaching career at the college with a state championship. His teams won or tied for the Maine championship in seven of his first eight years at Bowdoin.

Bowdoin suspended their football program in 1943 with the onset of World War II. In 1944, Walsh returned to Notre Dame as a line coach for a season. In 1945, he led the Cleveland Rams to the NFL Championship and coached the team the next season after a move to Los Angeles. He returned to Bowdoin after two years with the Rams and a 15–5–1 coaching record in the NFL. Between 1947 and 1958, Walsh's Bowdoin teams won outright or shared the Maine state championship four more times.

== Later life and honors ==
After retiring from coaching, Walsh served two terms in the Maine House of Representatives, representing Brunswick as a Democrat and was appointed the U.S. Marshal for Maine under Presidents Kennedy and Johnson.

Walsh was inducted into the College Football Hall of Fame in 1968, the Helms Hall of Fame, and the Maine Sports Hall of Fame in 1976. He was also named to the All-Time Southern California High School Team, the All-time Notre Dame Team, and the All-time Rose Bowl Team.

== Head coaching record ==
=== College ===
Year	Team	Overall	Conference	Standing	Bowl/playoffs
Santa Clara Broncos (Independent) (1925–1928)
1925	Santa Clara	2–5			
1926	Santa Clara	5–4			
1927	Santa Clara	5–4–2			
1928	Santa Clara	5–4			
Santa Clara:		17–18–2			
Bowdoin Polar Bears (Maine Intercollegiate Athletic Association) (1935–1942)
1935	Bowdoin	5–1–1		1st	
1936	Bowdoin	5–2		1st	
1937	Bowdoin	4–1–2		1st	
1938	Bowdoin	6–1		T–st	
1939	Bowdoin	5–1–1		T–1st	
1940	Bowdoin	3–2–2		T–1st	
1941	Bowdoin	1–6			
1942	Bowdoin	5–2		1st	
Bowdoin Polar Bears (Maine Intercollegiate Athletic Association) (1947–1958)
1947	Bowdoin	3–4			
1948	Bowdoin	4–3		T–1st	
1949	Bowdoin	3–3–1		1st	
1950	Bowdoin	3–3–1		T–st	
1951	Bowdoin	5–2			
1952	Bowdoin	5–2		1st	
1953	Bowdoin	4–3			
1954	Bowdoin	0–7			
1955	Bowdoin	1–6			
1956	Bowdoin	0–7			
1957	Bowdoin	1–5			
1958	Bowdoin	0–6–1			
Bowdoin:		63–67–9			
Total:		80–85–11			
National championship Conference title Conference division title or championship game berth

=== NFL ===
Team	Year	Regular season					Postseason			
Team	Year	Won	Lost	Ties	Win %	Finish	Won	Lost	Win %	Result
CLE	1945	9	1	0	.900	1st in NFL West	1	0	1.000	NFL champions
LA	1946	6	4	1	.600	2nd in NFL West	–	–	–	–
Total		15	5	1	.750		1	0	1.000	
