= 1945 NFL Championship Game =

Coordinates: 41.506°N 81.700°W

Washington Redskins (Eastern) (8–2)	Cleveland Rams (Western) (9–1)
14	15
Head coach: Dudley DeGroot	Head coach: Adam Walsh
	1	2	3	4	Total
WAS	0	7	7	0	14
CLE	2	7	6	0	15
- Date: December 16, 1945
- Stadium: Cleveland Municipal Stadium; Cleveland, Ohio
- Favorite: Cleveland by 4 points
- Referee: Ronald Gibbs
- Attendance: 32,178

Radio in the United States
- Network: Blue
- Announcers: Harry Wismer

The 1945 NFL Championship Game was the 13th National Football League (NFL) championship game. Held on December 16, the Cleveland Rams defeated the Washington Redskins 15–14 at Cleveland Municipal Stadium in Cleveland, Ohio. The Rams became the first expansion team to win an NFL championship.

This was the last game before the Rams moved west to Los Angeles, California. One play which provided the Rams' margin of victory led to a significant rule change in professional football. If the title game had ended in a tie, the teams would have shared the championship.

It was the coldest NFL championship game up to that time, with a temperature of −8 °F (−22 °C), which significantly curtailed the expected attendance and revenue.

== The game ==
In the first quarter, the Redskins had the ball at their own 5-yard line. Dropping back into the end zone, quarterback Sammy Baugh, playing his fifth championship game in nine years, threw the ball, but it hit the goal post (which were on the goal line from 1933 through 1973) and bounced back to the ground in the end zone. Under the rules at the time, this was a safety, which gave the Rams a 2–0 lead.

The Rams trying to stay warm on the sideline during the 1945 NFL Championship Game.

In the second quarter, Baugh suffered bruised ribs and was replaced by Frank Filchock, who threw a 38-yard touchdown pass to Steve Bagarus to give the Redskins a 7–2 lead. The Rams scored just before halftime when rookie quarterback Bob Waterfield completed a 37-yard touchdown pass to Jim Benton. Waterfield's ensuing extra point was partially blocked, with the ball teetering on the crossbar, but it dropped over to give Cleveland a 9–7 lead.

Halfback Jim Gillette of the Rams breaks free for a 44-yard touchdown.

In the third quarter, the Rams increased their lead to 15–7 when Jim Gillette scored on a 44-yard touchdown reception, but this time the extra point was missed.

The Redskins then came back to cut their deficit to 15–14 with Bob Seymour's 8-yard touchdown catch from Filchock; in the fourth quarter, Washington kicker Joe Aguirre missed two field goals attempts, of 46 and 31 yards, that could have won the game.

But it was the first quarter safety that proved to be the margin of victory. After the game, Redskins owner George Preston Marshall was so incensed at the outcome that he became a driving force in passing a major rule change after the season - a forward pass that strikes the goal posts is automatically ruled incomplete. This rule eventually became known as the "Baugh/Marshall Rule" and remained in effect until 1974, when the goal posts returned to the end line and were impossible to hit with a legal forward pass, which made the rule dead letter.

Upper deck ticket for the 1945 "World's Professional Football Championship" game held in Cleveland. Printed ahead of the game, these tickets included neither the date or the name of the Eastern Conference opponent.

== Officials ==
- Referee: Ronald Gibbs
- Umpire: Harry Robb
- Head linesman: Charlie Berry
- Field judge: Bill Downes

The NFL had only four game officials in 1945; the back judge was added in 1947, the line judge in 1965, and the side judge in 1978.

== Player shares ==
Total revenue generated by the championship game totaled $164,542, which included $15,081 for radio broadcast rights, a new record. Of this total, $95,261 was allotted to the players, resulting in shares of about $1,409 per player for the victorious Rams and $902 per player for the losing Redskins.

== Rams relocation to Los Angeles ==
Despite winning the World Championship, Rams owner Dan Reeves lost $64,000 with his franchise during the 1945 season.

These financial losses, combined with the Rams' poor home attendances and the awarding of a Cleveland franchise (Browns) in the soon to be formed All-America Football Conference (AAFC), ensured the relocation of the Rams to Los Angeles in January 1946.

== Game statistics ==
=== Scoring summary ===
Quarter	1	2	3	4	Total
Redskins	0	7	7	0	14
Rams	2	7	6	0	15

at Cleveland Municipal Stadium, Cleveland, Ohio

- Date: December 16, 1945
- Game time: 1:30 p.m. EST
- Game weather: −8 °F (−22 °C)
- Referee: Ronald Gibbs

Scoring Play	Score
1st Quarter
CLE – Safety, Baugh's pass from end zone hit goal post	CLE 2–0
2nd Quarter
WAS – Bagarus 38 pass from Filchock (Aguirre kick)	WAS 7–2
CLE – Benton 37 pass from Waterfield (Waterfield kick)	CLE 9–7
3rd Quarter
CLE – Gillette 44 pass from Waterfield (kick failed)	CLE 15–7
WAS – Seymour 8 pass from Filchock (Aguirre kick)	CLE 15–14
4th Quarter
no scoring	CLE 15–14

First downs: Rams 14, Redskins 8

Yards rushing: Rams 44 carries for 180 yards, Redskins 34 carries for 35 yards

Passing: Rams 11-for-27 for 192 yards (2 TDs), Redskins 9-for-20 for 179 yards (2 TDs)

Return yardage: Rams 131, Redskins 155

Fumbles-Lost: Rams 1-1, Redskins 1–0

Penalties: Rams 6 for 60 yards, Redskins 4 for 29 yards
