= 1945 NFL season =

American football season

Regular season
- Duration: September 23 – December 9, 1945
- East Champions: Washington Redskins
- West Champions: Cleveland Rams

Championship Game
- Champions: Cleveland Rams

NFL teams: West, East

The 1945 NFL season was the 26th regular season of the National Football League. The Pittsburgh Steelers and the Chicago Cardinals resumed their traditional operations.

The remains of the final Ohio League member Dayton Triangles, then known as the Brooklyn Tigers, and the Boston Yanks merged for this one season. The combined team, known simply as The Yanks, played four games at Boston's Fenway Park and one game at New York's Yankee Stadium. After Brooklyn Tigers owner Dan Topping announced his intentions to join the new All-America Football Conference, his rights to the Triangles' legacy franchise were immediately revoked after the season and all of its players were assigned to the Boston Yanks, who carried on the team's lineage.

The season ended when the Cleveland Rams defeated the Washington Redskins in the NFL Championship Game in Cleveland.

== Draft ==
The 1945 NFL draft was held on April 8, 1945, at New York City's Commodore Hotel. With the first pick, the Chicago Cardinals selected halfback Charley Trippi from the University of Georgia.

== Major rule changes ==
- The inbounds lines or hashmarks were moved closer to the center of the field, from 15 yards to 20 yards from the sidelines (from 70 feet apart to 40 feet apart). This remained the standard until 1972, when the hashmarks were moved in to the width of the goalposts, 18½ feet apart.
- The player who extends his arms under the center must receive the snap or the offensive team will be penalized for a false start.
- When a snap is muffed by a receiving player and then touches the ground, it is legally a fumble which may be advanced.
- During an extra point attempt, the ball is spotted at the 2-yard line, but the offense may opt to have it be placed further from the goal line.
- A kicked ball which travels beyond the line of scrimmage and is recovered by the kicking team anywhere in the field of play after touching a member of the receiving team becomes 1st-and-10 for the recovering team.
- Referees to designate the offending player in a penalty call when known.

== Division races ==
In the Eastern Division, the Yanks were still unbeaten (2–0–1) as of Week Four; at their only Yankee Stadium game (October 14), they had a 13–10 lead, but the Giants tied them 13–13. In Week Five, the Yanks' 38–14 loss to Green Bay, put them at 2–1–1, tied with 2–1–0 Washington, while in the Western race, the Rams reached 4–0 after a 41–21 win over the Bears.

In Week Six, halfway through the ten-game season, Boston and Washington both won, putting them even at 3–1–1 and 3–1–0.

The Rams' 28–14 loss to the Eagles, along with wins by the Lions and Packers, tied all four teams at 4–1 in the West. In Week Seven, a blocked extra point attempt gave Detroit a 10–9 win at Boston, keeping the Lions tied with the Rams (at 5–1) for the Western lead, while taking the 3–2–1 Yanks to a game behind the 4–1 Redskins.

In Week Nine, the Rams took the lead in the Western after a 35–21 win over the Cards, while the Lions lost 35–14 to the Giants.

In Week Ten, the 7–1 Rams and the 6–2 Lions met in Detroit's Thanksgiving Day game. For the Lions it was a must-win game, but they lost 28–21; thus, at 8–1, the Rams clinched the division and the right to host the Championship Game.

Days later, the 5–2 Eagles hosted the 6–1 Redskins, and the Eagles' 16–0 win tied the teams at 6–2 in the Eastern race. The next week, however, the Eagles lost to the Giants 28–21, while the Redskins beat the Steelers 24–0. Washington's 17–0 win over the Giants the next week clinched the division.

== Final standings ==
NFL Eastern Division
	W	L	T	PCT	DIV	PF	PA	STK
Washington Redskins	8	2	0	.800	6–2	209	121	W2
Philadelphia Eagles	7	3	0	.700	5–2	272	133	W1
Yanks	3	6	1	.333	3–2–1	123	211	L5
New York Giants	3	6	1	.333	2–4–1	179	198	L1
Pittsburgh Steelers	2	8	0	.200	1–7	79	220	L3

Note: Tie games were not officially counted in the standings until 1972.

NFL Western Division
	W	L	T	PCT	DIV	PF	PA	STK
Cleveland Rams	9	1	0	.900	7–0	244	136	W5
Detroit Lions	7	3	0	.700	5–2	195	194	W1
Green Bay Packers	6	4	0	.600	3–4	258	173	L1
Chicago Bears	3	7	0	.300	2–6	192	235	W2
Chicago Cardinals	1	9	0	.100	1–6	98	228	L6

== NFL Championship Game ==
Cleveland 15, Washington 14, at Cleveland Stadium in Cleveland, Ohio, on December 16

== League leaders ==
Statistic	Name	Team	Yards
Passing	Sid Luckman	Chicago Bears	1727
Rushing	Steve Van Buren	Philadelphia	832
Receiving	Jim Benton	Cleveland Rams	1067

== Awards ==
Joe F. Carr Trophy (Most Valuable Player)	Bob Waterfield, quarterback, Cleveland

== Coaching changes ==
- Chicago Cardinals: Phil Handler returned as sole head coach after the team resumed traditional operations.
- Cleveland Rams: Aldo Donelli was replaced by Adam Walsh.
- Pittsburgh Steelers: Walt Kiesling resigned after the team resumed traditional operations. Jim Leonard was named as the new Steelers coach.

== Stadium changes ==
- The Chicago Cardinals resumed traditional operations full time at Comiskey Park
- The Pittsburgh Steelers resumed traditional operations full time at Forbes Field
- The merged Yanks played four games at Boston's Fenway Park and one game at New York City's Yankee Stadium
