= 1943 All-Pacific Coast football team =

American all-star college football team

The 1943 All-Pacific Coast football team consists of American football players chosen by various organizations for All-Pacific Coast teams for the 1943 college football season. The organizations selecting teams in 1943 included the Associated Press (AP) and the United Press (UP).

The USC Trojans won the Pacific Coast Conference (PCC) championship with an 8-2 record and had three players named to the first team by either the AP or UP: quarterback Mickey McCardle (AP, UP), end Ralph Heywood (AP, UP), and center Bill Gray (AP, UP).

The Washington Huskies finished with a 4-1 record, were ranked #12 in the final AP Poll and placed four players on the first team: backs Sam Robinson (UP) and Pete Susick (AP), end Jack Tracy (AP, UP), and guard Bill Ward (AP, UP).

Five players from teams outside the PCC received first-team honors. Four of them played for the Pacific Tigers football team coached by Amos Alonzo Stagg: fullback John Podesto (AP, UP), tackles Art McCaffray (AP, UP) and Earl Klapstein (UP), and guard Bart Gianelli (AP, UP). The fifth was College Football Hall of Fame back Herman Wedemeyer (UP) of the St. Mary's Gaels.

== All-Pacific Coast selections ==
=== Quarterback ===
- Mickey McCardle, USC (AP-1; UP-1)
- Jack Verutti, Pacific (AP-3; UP-2)
- Jay Stoves, Washington (AP-2)
- Joe Ferem, Pacific (AP-3)

=== Halfbacks ===
- Sam Robinson, Washington (AP-2; UP-1)
- Herman Wedemeyer, St.Mary's (AP-2; UP-1) (College Football Hall of Fame)
- Art Honegger, California (AP-1; UP-2)
- Pete Susick, Washington (AP-1; UP-2)
- Howard Callanan, USC (AP-2; UP-2)
- Bob Frisbee, California (AP-3)

=== Fullback ===
- Johnny Podesto, Pacific (AP-1; UP-1)
- Ray Ahlstrom, Pacific (AP-3)

=== Ends ===
- Ralph Heywood, USC (AP-1; UP-1)
- Jack Tracy, Washington (AP-1; UP-1)
- Carl Lueder, Pacific (AP-3; UP-2)
- Herb Weiner, UCLA (AP-2; UP-2)
- Pete McPhail, USC (AP-2)
- Donn Doerr, California (AP-3)

=== Tackles ===
- Art McCaffray, Pacific (AP-1; UP-1)
- Earl Klapstein, Pacific (AP-2; UP-1)
- Don Malmbertg, UCLA (AP-1; UP-2)
- Fred Boensch, California (AP-2)
- Mill Hatchen, California (UP-2)
- Don Deeks, Washington (AP-3)
- Jim Cox, California (AP-3)

=== Guards ===
- Bill Ward, Washington (AP-1; UP-1)
- Bart Gianelli, Pacific (AP-1; UP-1)
- Dick Jamison, USC (AP-2)
- John Ceccarelli, Pacific (AP-2; UP-2)
- Mark Garzoni, USC (AP-3; UP-2)
- Mike Marienthal, UCLA (AP-3)

=== Centers ===
- Bill Gray, USC (AP-1; UP-1)
- Jim Watson, Pacific (AP-2)
- Jack Murden, Nevada (UP-2)
- Don Paul, UCLA (AP-3)

== Key ==
AP = Associated Press

UP = United Press

Bold = Consensus first-team selection of both the AP and UP

== See also ==
- 1943 College Football All-America Team
