= List of Pacific Tigers in the NFL draft =

This is a list of Pacific Tigers football players in the NFL draft.

== Key ==
B	Back	K	Kicker	NT	Nose tackle
C	Center	LB	Linebacker	FB	Fullback
DB	Defensive back	P	Punter	HB	Halfback
DE	Defensive end	QB	Quarterback	WR	Wide receiver
DT	Defensive tackle	RB	Running back	G	Guard
E	End	T	Offensive tackle	TE	Tight end

== Selections ==
Year	Round	Pick	Overall	Player	Team	Position
1944	4	4	31	Art McCaffray	Pittsburgh Steelers	T
1944	24	9	250	Earl Klapstein	Philadelphia Eagles	T
1948	25	8	233	George Brumm	Chicago Bears	C
1949	20	8	199	Bob Heck	Chicago Bears	B
1949	23	8	229	Harry Kane	Chicago Bears	C
1950	2	9	23	Don Campora	San Francisco 49ers	T
1950	5	10	63	Harry Kane	San Francisco 49ers	C
1950	8	5	97	John Rohde	Washington Redskins	E
1950	10	5	123	Eddie LeBaron	Washington Redskins	QB
1950	24	10	310	Walt Polenske	Chicago Bears	B
1950	27	10	349	Ken Johnson	San Francisco 49ers	G
1950	29	11	376	Bob Heck	Los Angeles Rams	B
1950	30	2	380	John Poulos	New York Bulldogs	B
1951	4	9	47	Bob Moser	Chicago Bears	C
1951	12	10	145	Don Hardey	Los Angeles Rams	B
1951	15	10	181	Sid Hall	Chicago Bears	C
1952	2	7	20	Eddie Macon	Chicago Bears	B
1952	5	11	60	Keever Jankovich	Cleveland Browns	E
1952	6	5	66	Duane Putnam	Los Angeles Rams	G
1952	7	12	85	Burt Delevan	Los Angeles Rams	T
1952	8	12	97	Tom McCormick	Los Angeles Rams	B
1952	10	11	120	Pat Ribiero	Cleveland Browns	T
1952	24	10	287	Wes Mitchell	New York Giants	E
1952	25	10	299	Bill Kelley	New York Giants	C
1953	18	10	215	Dick Betten	Cleveland Browns	T
1954	2	4	17	Ken Buck	New York Giants	E
1954	15	1	170	Cecil Harp	Chicago Cardinals	E
1954	20	2	231	Lowell Herbert	Green Bay Packers	G
1954	21	2	243	Art Liebscher	Green Bay Packers	B
1955	25	12	301	Ernie Lindo	Cleveland Browns	B
1956	3	7	32	A. D. Williams	Los Angeles Rams	DE
1956	7	1	74	Gene Cronin	Detroit Lions	DE
1957	6	9	70	John Nisby	Green Bay Packers	G
1957	9	8	105	Galen Laack	Washington Redskins	G
1957	23	7	272	John Thomas	San Francisco 49ers	E
1958	5	11	60	Farrell Funston	Cleveland Browns	E
1958	8	3	88	Bill Striegel	Philadelphia Eagles	LB
1958	11	7	128	Gerry Schweitzer	Los Angeles Rams	E
1959	1	2	2	Dick Bass	Los Angeles Rams	RB
1959	6	11	71	Bob Denton	Cleveland Browns	E
1959	10	8	116	Bobby Coronado	Chicago Bears	E
1960	2	10	22	Carl Kammerer	San Francisco 49ers	G
1960	6	10	70	Lee Murchison	San Francisco 49ers	E
1961	5	4	60	Willie Hector	Los Angeles Rams	G
1962	15	2	198	Larry Guilford	Minnesota Vikings	E
1963	2	13	27	Roy Williams	Detroit Lions	T
1963	7	12	96	John Gamble	Detroit Lions	G
1964	4	12	54	Don Shackelford	Cleveland Browns	T
1968	5	13	124	Mark Nordquist	Philadelphia Eagles	T
1968	11	27	300	Jeff Banks	Cincinnati Bengals	LB
1968	17	6	441	Bob Lee	Minnesota Vikings	QB
1969	2	11	37	Bob Heinz	Miami Dolphins	T
1969	4	13	91	Rudy Redmond	Chicago Bears	DB
1970	10	8	242	Tony Plummer	St. Louis Cardinals	DB
1970	13	5	317	Steve Schroeder	Buffalo Bills	K
1971	9	25	233	Honor Jackson	Dallas Cowboys	WR
1974	9	17	225	Larry Bailey	Atlanta Falcons	DT
1975	3	6	58	Willard Harrell	Green Bay Packers	RB
1975	10	6	240	Hank Englehardt	Denver Broncos	C
1975	12	10	296	Carlos Brown	Green Bay Packers	QB
1977	8	13	208	Al Cleveland	Dallas Cowboys	DE
1978	7	11	177	Bruce Gibson	Detroit Lions	RB
1978	12	26	332	Joe Conron	Oakland Raiders	WR
1980	5	7	117	Brad Vassar	Atlanta Falcons	LB
1980	8	14	207	Jack Cosgrove	Seattle Seahawks	C
1980	8	15	208	Mike House	New England Patriots	TE
1981	12	2	306	Jeff Bednarek	Seattle Seahawks	DT
1982	3	15	70	Mike Merriweather	Pittsburgh Steelers	LB
1982	8	11	206	Kirk Harmon	Minnesota Vikings	LB
1984	7	3	171	Lionel Manuel	New York Giants	WR
1984u	3	3	59	Kirby Warren	New York Giants	RB
1985	9	10	234	Paul Berner	San Diego Chargers	QB
1986	11	27	304	Gene Thomas	New England Patriots	WR
1987	6	20	160	Tim Richardson	New York Giants	RB
1993	4	9	93	Greg Bishop	New York Giants	T
1995	6	26	197	Craig Whelihan	San Diego Chargers	QB

== Notes ==
Kirby Warren was selected in the 1984 Supplemental Draft.
