= Ernie Case =

American football player (1920–1995)

- Case as sophomore QB of the UCLA Bruins

No. 67
- Positions: Quarterback, defensive back

Personal information
- Born: November 23, 1919; Post, Texas, U.S.
- Died: December 13, 1995 (aged 76); Palos Verdes Estates, California, U.S.
- Listed height: 5 ft 10 in (1.78 m)
- Listed weight: 170 lb (77 kg)

Career information
- High school: John C. Fremont (Los Angeles, California)
- College: UCLA
- NFL draft: 1947: 1st round, 6th overall pick

Career history
- Baltimore Colts (1947)

Awards and highlights
- Second-team All-American (1946); First-team All-PCC (1946); Second-team All-PCC (1945)

Career AAFC statistics
- Passing yards: 49
- TD–INT: 0-1
- Passer rating: 13.1
- Stats at Pro Football Reference

Ernest Francis Case (November 23, 1920 – December 13, 1995) was an American college football player who was a quarterback for the UCLA Bruins. A bomber pilot who was shot down and captured as a prisoner-of-war during World War II, Case is best remembered for leading UCLA to its first 10–0 season and a berth in the 1947 Rose Bowl game.

Although the first quarterback selected in the 1947 NFL draft, Case signed instead with the upstart Baltimore Colts of the All-America Football Conference (AAFC), playing just one uneventful season in a reserve role before retiring.

== Biography ==
=== College career, part 1 ===
Ernie Case enrolled at Los Angeles City College, where he played halfback on the school's football team. He transferred to University of California, Los Angeles (UCLA) in 1940. He started the season as the Bruins' second string left halfback. During this year coming off the bench, Case distinguished himself both for his quickness and for his passing acumen, tossing two long touchdown passes in one noteworthy scrimmage against the team's starters playing the role of Stanford University quarterback Frankie Albert.

As spring practice for the 1941 season approached, the sophomore Case appeared to be in line to take on the role of starting quarterback for the UCLA squad coached by Edwin C. "Babe" Horrell. This was formalized at the team's first practice of the fall in September, when Case was named UCLA's starting quarterback by Coach Horrell.

Competing with Case for the UCLA starting QB job was Bob Waterfield, a future superstar of the National Football League. By the time of the season opener against Washington State University, Waterfield had won the starting quarterback position, with the left-handed Case relegated to a backup role.

=== Wartime interlude ===
Unfortunately, life intervened and Case's college days were interrupted by American entry into World War II. Motivated by the December 1941 attack on Pearl Harbor, on January 10, 1942, Case informed Coach Horrell that he was leaving school to enlist in the Army Air Corps in support of the nation's war effort.

Case trained as a pilot and flew as captain of a bomber on the European front, flying 12 missions without mishap. Case's 13th mission, flown in February 1943, proved unlucky, however, and he was shot down by Italian forces over Sardinia. Case suffered a broken hip and shattered parachuting from his crippled plane and was captured by enemy forces. After a brief period of hospitalization, he was transferred from Sardinia to a prisoner-of-war camp at Chieti, located on the Italian mainland.

On September 23, 1943, with POWs being moved from Italy to more secure sites in Germany, Case and a comrade took advantage of the diversion provided by an Allied bombing of his locale, escaping through a hole in his stockade fence. The pair made their way towards invading Allied forces, subsisting on whatever they could find to eat, including bread and water provided by friendly Italians, eventually meeting up with a patrol of the Canadian 8th Army on October 26 at the municipality of Trivento. Before the war was over, Case attained the rank of 1st lieutenant and had been awarded the Purple Heart for wounds suffered in action.

After liberation, Case was returned to the United States for rehabilitation of his wounds and was stationed at Mather Field, near Sacramento, California. He received his discharge in 1945 and returned to UCLA to complete his college education.

=== College career, part 2 ===
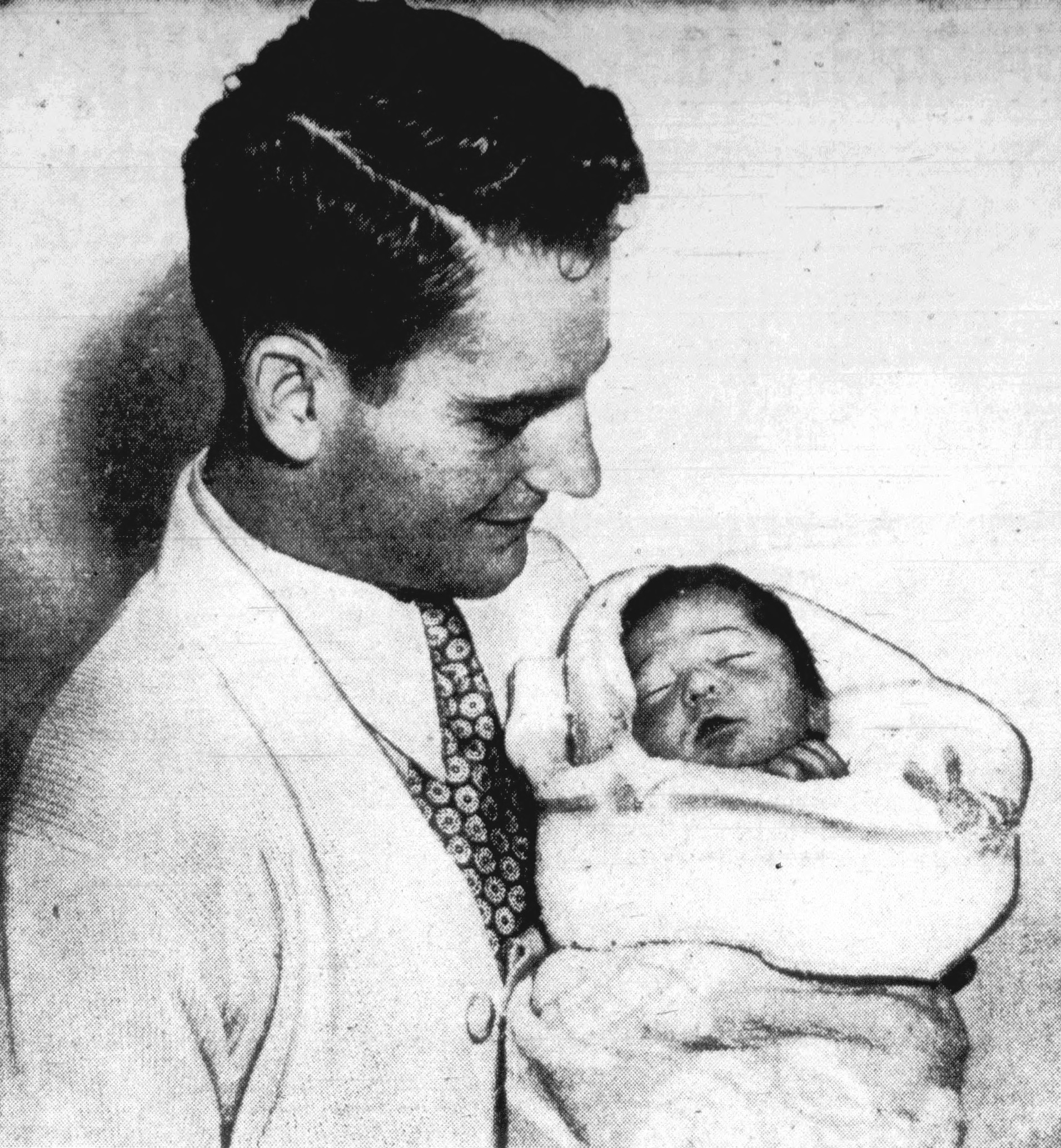
Case in 1945 holding his infant son, Ernie Jr.

Back at UCLA in 1945, Case returned to the school's football team, now coached by Bert LaBrucherie. Although slightly undersized and wiry, standing 5 feet 10 inches (1.78 m) tall and weighing just 170 pounds (77 kg), Case nevertheless won the starting quarterback role and was elected team captain in 1945. Case saw extensive action for UCLA as its starting quarterback in both 1945 and 1946, his junior and senior seasons, sharing team captaincy duties in the latter year with end Burr Baldwin. As an older-than-average student with a recent history as a war hero who returned to college to play football, Case was something of a novelty and received periodic nationwide attention in the press.

In addition to his quarterbacking duties, Case also served as the team's kicker. Off the field, he was even more busy, married and the father of two young sons. He also was an excellent student, making high grades while working towards a degree in accounting at UCLA.

UCLA was recognized as one of the top football teams in the United States in 1946, with Case running the team's T formation offense to perfection. The team was ranked number one in the country and took an 8–0 record into a final confrontation with the arch-rival USC Trojans (5–2) in late November — with a bid to the 1947 Rose Bowl in the balance.

UCLA managed to beat the hated Trojans in front of nearly 94,000 rain-soaked fans, winning by a score of 13–6, with Case scoring the go-ahead touchdown with a quarterback sneak. UCLA thus won the Pacific Coast Conference championship and an automatic bid to the Rose Bowl, where they were to face midwestern powerhouse the Illinois Fighting Illini. But before this ultimate game, the team finished up its first unbeaten regular season with a trip to Lincoln, Nebraska, where they demolished the Nebraska Cornhuskers, 18–0.

The 10–0 Bruins entered the 1947 Rose Bowl on New Year's Day as oddsmakers' favorite. Case and UCLA briefly took an early 7–6 lead with a quarterback sneak, but the day belonged to the Illini, who racked up a Rose Bowl record 320 yards of offense, blowing out the Bruins, 45–14. Case did manage one noteworthy achievement in the losing effort, setting a new Rose Bowl record with 165 yards passing, connecting on 11 of his 24 attempts.

After the Rose Bowl, Case and some other California-based college players traveled to Honolulu, to play in the inaugural edition of what came to be known as the Hula Bowl. Case's team defeated a local Hawaii-based team, 34–7, on January 5, 1947.

=== Professional career ===
In December 1946, the Green Bay Packers of the National Football League selected Case with the sixth overall pick in the first round of the 1947 NFL draft — the first quarterback selected. Case chose instead to sign with the Baltimore Colts of the rival All-America Football Conference, however, joining former UCLA teammate Burr Baldwin, an All-American, in the upstart professional league.

Case's contract with the Colts, signed in February 1946, was for three years; financial terms were not disclosed.

Case would play only one season for the Colts before retiring. He saw extremely limited action during that 1947 season, going 4-for-11 passing for just 49 total yards, with one interception. He was rather more successful on the defensive side of the ball, intercepting two passes and amassing 56 yards on interception returns. He also kicked one field goal and one point after touchdown for the Colts, ending his career with four points scored.

=== Life after football ===
Case enrolled as a law student at the University of Southern California in the summer of 1947.

=== Death and legacy ===
Ernie Case died on December 13, 1995. He was 75 years old at the time of his death.

On November 4, 2011, Case was inducted into the UCLA Athletics Hall of Fame.
