= 1946 All-Pacific Coast football team =

American all-star college football team

The 1946 All-Pacific Coast football team consists of American football players chosen by various organizations for All-Pacific Coast teams for the 1946 college football season. The organizations selecting teams in 1946 included the Associated Press (AP) and the United Press (UP).

The UCLA Bruins won the Pacific Coast Conference (PCC) championship with a 10–1 record, finished the season ranked #4 in the final AP Poll, and had four first-team players: quarterback Ernie Case (AP, UP), end Burr Baldwin (AP, UP), tackle Don Malmberg (AP, UP), and center/linebacker Don Paul (AP, UP).

Despite finishing second in the PCC with a 7–1–1 record, Oregon State did not land any player on the first teams selected by either the AP or the UP. USC, Stanford and Washington finished in third, fourth and fifth place in the PCC, and each placed two players on the first team.

Three players from teams outside the PCC received first-team honors, They were St. Mary's Gaels halfback Herman Wedemeyer (AP, UP), who was later inducted into the College Football Hall of Fame, San Francisco Dons halfback Forest Hall (AP, UP), and Nevada end Horace Gillom (UP).

== All-Pacific Coast selections ==
=== Quarterbacks ===
- Ernie Case, UCLA (AP-1; UP-1)
- Mickey McCardle, USC (AP-2; UP-2)
- Denis O'Connor, St. Mary's (AP-3)

=== Halfbacks ===
- Herman Wedemeyer, St. Mary's (AP-1; UP-1) (College Football Hall of Fame)
- Forrest Hall, Univ. of San Francisco (AP-1; UP-1)
- Jake Leicht, Oregon (AP-2; UP-2)
- Cal Rossi, UCLA (AP-3; UP-2)
- Don Samuel, Oregon St. (AP-2)
- Jerry Shipkey, UCLA (AP-2)
- Bob Anderson, Stanford (UP-2)
- Ernie Johnson, UCLA (AP-3)
- Ken Carpenter, Oregon St. (AP-3)

=== Fullbacks ===
- Lloyd Merriman, Stanford (AP-1; UP-1)

=== Ends ===
- Burr Baldwin, UCLA (AP-1; UP-1)
- Dick Hagen, Washington (AP-1; UP-2)
- Horace Gillom, Nevada (AP-2; UP-1)
- Tom Fears, UCLA (AP-3; UP-2)
- Jim Callanan, USC (AP-2)
- Jack Cunningham, California (AP-3)

=== Tackles ===
- John Ferraro, USC (AP-1; UP-1)
- Don Malmberg, UCLA (AP-1; UP-1)
- Bill Chambers, UCLA (AP-2; UP-2)
- Bill McPartland, St. Mary's (AP-3; UP-2)
- Jim Turner, California (AP-2)
- Fred Boensch, Stanford (AP-3)

=== Guards ===
- Bill Hachten, Stanford (AP-1; UP-1)
- Mike Garzoni, USC (AP-1; UP-2)
- John Zeger, Washington (AP-3; UP-1)
- Paul Evenson, Oregon St. (UP-2)
- Martin Chaves, Oregon St. (AP-2)
- Mike Dimitro, UCLA (AP-2)
- Rod Franz, California (AP-3)

=== Centers ===
- Don Paul, UCLA (AP-1; UP-1)
- Bill Gray, Oregon St. (AP-2; UP-2)
- Andy Lazor, Washington St. (AP-3)

== Key ==
AP = Associated Press

UP = United Press

Bold = Consensus first-team selection of both the AP and UP

== See also ==
- 1946 College Football All-America Team
