= Herman Wedemeyer =

American actor and politician (1924–1999)

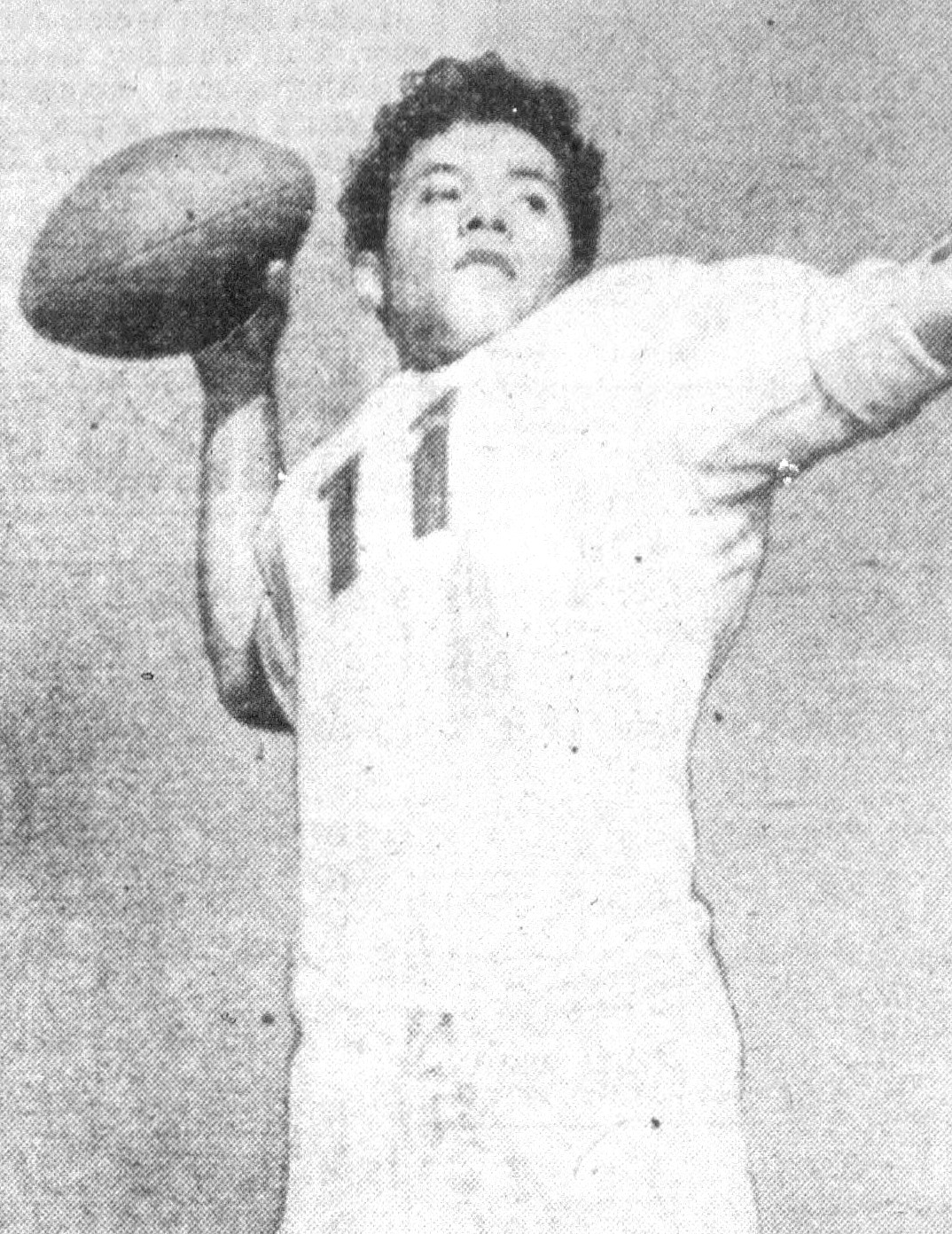
- Wedemeyer, circa 1945

No. 99, 87
- Position: Back

Personal information
- Born: May 20, 1924; Honolulu, Hawaii, U.S.
- Died: January 25, 1999 (aged 74); Honolulu, Hawaii, U.S.
- Listed height: 5 ft 10 in (1.78 m)
- Listed weight: 178 lb (81 kg)

Career information
- High school: Saint Louis (Honolulu)
- College: Saint Mary's (CA) (1943, 1945-1947)
- NFL draft: 1947: 1st round, 9th overall pick

Career history
- Los Angeles Dons (1948); Baltimore Colts (1949); San Francisco 49ers (1950)*
- * Offseason or practice squad member only

Awards and highlights
- Consensus All-American (1945); Second-team All-American (1946); 3× First-team All-PCC (1943, 1945, 1946); Second-team All-PCC (1947); AAFC punt return yards leader (1948); AAFC kickoff return yards leader (1949)

Career AAFC statistics
- Rushing yards: 540
- Rushing average: 3.8
- Receptions: 46
- Receiving yards: 442
- Total touchdowns: 2
- Stats at Pro Football Reference
- College Football Hall of Fame

Herman John Wedemeyer (May 20, 1924 – January 25, 1999) was an American actor, football player, and politician.

He is best known for portraying Sergeant/Detective "Duke" Lukela on the crime drama Hawaii Five-O (1972–1980). He also appeared on the first episode of Hawaii Five-O as Lt. Balta of the Honolulu Police Department.

== Sports career ==
Wedemeyer attended St. Louis School in Honolulu and was a standout in both football and baseball. Wedemeyer, a halfback, played college football for the St. Mary's College Galloping Gaels in Moraga, California. In 1945, he finished fourth in the Heisman Trophy voting, and he was inducted into the College Football Hall of Fame in 1979.

Wedemeyer was Hawai'i's first consensus All-American football player. He bore the colorful nicknames "Squirmin' Herman", "The Flyin' Hawaiian", "The Hawaiian Centipede", and "The Hula-Hipped Hawaiian".

Wedemeyer was a first-round draft choice of the Los Angeles Dons of the All-America Football Conference in 1948.

Despite leading the AAFC in punt return yardage that year, he was waived by the Dons. He was then signed by the AAFC Baltimore Colts, with whom he played in 1949 before retiring from professional sports for good.

== Government service ==
In 1968, Wedemeyer was elected to the Honolulu City Council as a Republican. In 1970, he was elected to the Hawaii House of Representatives as a Democrat, winning re-election in 1972. He served as the chairman of the Committee on Tourism.

== Hawaii Five-O ==
Wedemeyer played Edward D. "Duke" Lukela on Hawaii Five-O from 1971 to 1980, appearing in 143 episodes. Lukela was originally a uniformed HPD sergeant, but he later joined the Five-O squad as a detective.

== Personal life ==
Wedermeyer's brother was Charlie Wedemeyer, a former Michigan State football player who, after being diagnosed with Lou Gehrig's disease, continued to teach and coach football at Los Gatos High School in Los Gatos, California. Charlie was the subject of a television drama called Quiet Victory: The Charlie Wedemeyer Story and the PBS documentary "One More Season".

== Filmography ==
- Hawaii Five-O (1968–1980) - Det. Duke Lukela
- The Hawaiians (1970) - Fire Chief (uncredited)
- Magnum, P.I. (1981) - Coroner
- Hawaii Five-O (1998 TV pilot) (1998) - Duke (final film role)
