= 1945 All-Pacific Coast football team =

American all-star college football team

The 1945 All-Pacific Coast football team consists of American football players chosen by various organizations for All-Pacific Coast teams for the 1945 college football season. The organizations selecting teams in 1945 included the Associated Press (AP) and the United Press (UP).

The USC Trojans won the Pacific Coast Conference (PCC) championship with a 7–4 record, finished the season ranked #11 in the final AP Poll, and had two players named to the first team by either the AP or UP: end Jim Callanan (AP, UP) and halfback Ted Teannehill (AP).

The Washington State Cougars finished in second place in the PCC with a 6–2–1 record and also placed two players on the first team: fullback Bill Lippincott (UP) and tackle Rod Giske (AP, UP).

Four players from teams outside the PCC received first-team honors. Three of those played for the St. Mary's Gaels: quarterback Herman Wedemeyer (AP, UP), halfback "Spike" Cordeiro (UP), and end Ed Ryan (AP, UP). The fourth was tackle Bob McClure (UP) of Nevada.

== All-Pacific Coast selections ==
=== Quarterbacks ===
- Jake Leicht, Oregon (AP-1; UP-1)
- Denis O'Connor, St. Mary's (AP-2; UP-2)

=== Halfbacks ===
- Herman Wedemeyer, St. Mary's (AP-1; UP-1) (College Football Hall of Fame)
- Charles Albert (Spike) Cordeiro Jr., St. Mary's (AP-3; UP-1)
- Ted Tannehill, USC (AP-1 [back]; UP-2)
- Cal Rossi, UCLA (AP-1 [back])
- Bob Stevens, Oregon State (AP-2)
- Skip Rowland, UCLA (AP-2)
- Ernie Case, UCLA (AP-3; UP-2)
- Stone, Washington (AP-3)

=== Fullbacks ===
- Bill Lippincott, Washington State (AP-2; UP-1)
- Theodore Kenfield, California (AP-3; UP-2)

=== Ends ===
- Jim Callanan, USC (AP-1; UP-1)
- Ed Ryan, St. Mary's (AP-1; UP-1)
- Dick Lorenz, Oregon State (AP-2)
- Max Dodge, Nevada (AP-3; UP-2)
- Bob Nelson, Washington (AP-2; UP-2)
- Francis Bacoka, Washington State (AP-3)

=== Tackles ===
- Rod Giske, Washington State (AP-1; UP-1)
- Wendell Beard, California (AP-1)
- Bob McClure, Nevada (AP-2; UP-1)
- Asher, UCLA (AP-2)
- Jack Musick, USC (UP-2)
- Don Malmberg, UCLA (UP-2)
- Klein, Idaho (AP-3)
- Al Beasley, St. Mary's (AP-3)

=== Guards ===
- Alf Hemstad, Washington (AP-1; UP-1)
- Al Sparlis, UCLA (AP-1; UP-1) (College Football Hall of Fame)
- David Schwayder, California (AP-2)
- John Kaufman, Oregon (AP-2)
- Bill Austin, Oregon State (UP-2)
- Bolt, Fresno State (UP-2)
- Fred Osterhout, Washington (AP-3)
- Laurie Niemi, Washington State (AP-3)

=== Centers ===
- Bill McGovern, Washington (AP-1; UP-1)
- Vic Cuccia, St. Mary's (AP-2)
- Walt McCormick, USC (AP-3; UP-2)

== Key ==
AP = Associated Press

UP = United Press

Bold = Consensus first-team selection of both the AP and UP

== See also ==
- 1945 College Football All-America Team
