= Michael Nouri =

American actor (born 1945)

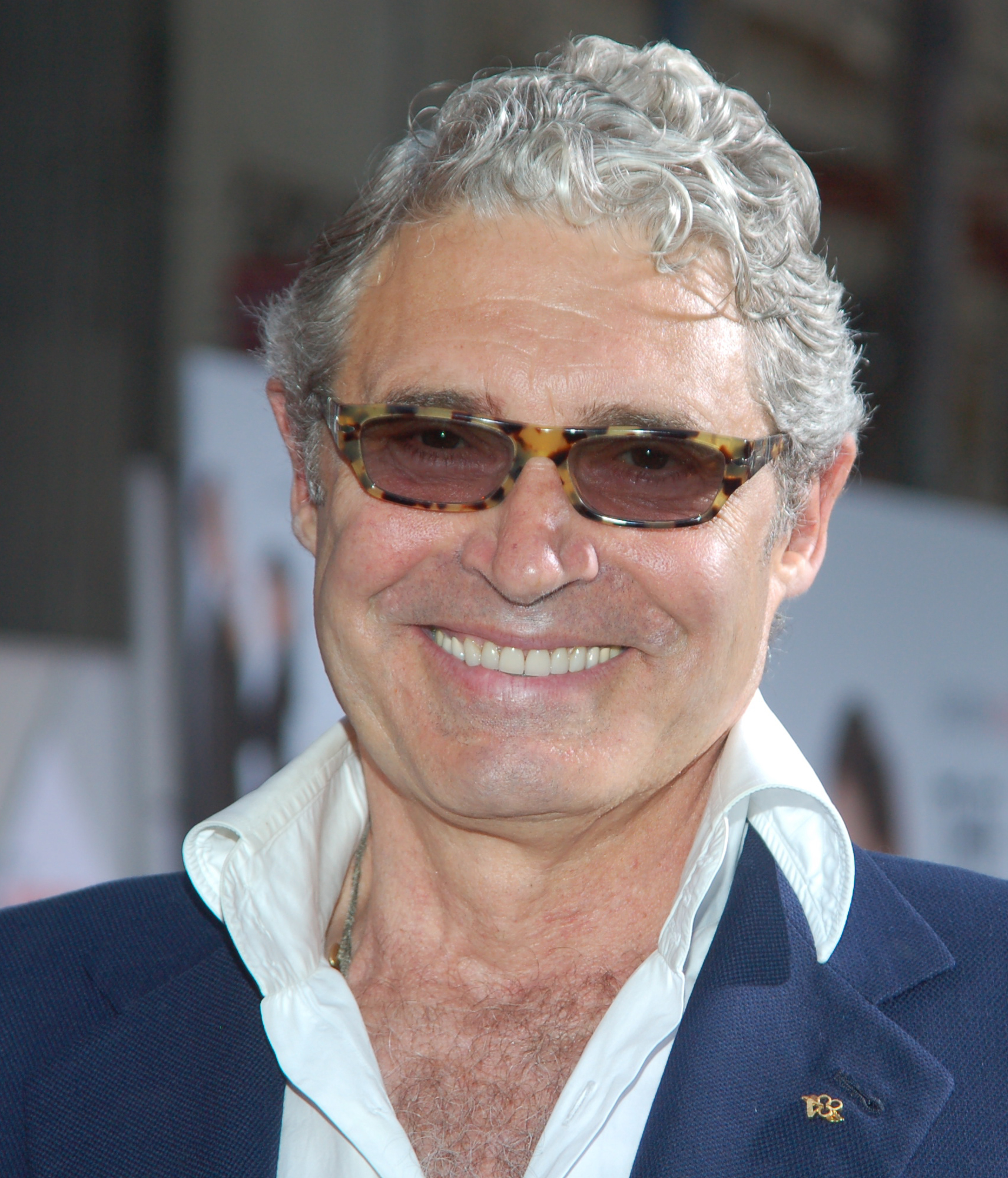
- Nouri in 2009
- Born: December 9, 1945 (age 80); Washington, D.C., U.S.
- Education: Rollins College; Emerson College
- Occupation: Actor
- Years active: 1967–present
- Spouses: Lynn Goldsmith (m. 1976; div. 1978) Vicki Light (m. 1986; div. 2001)
- Children: 2
- Website: michaelnouri.com

Michael Nouri (born December 9, 1945) is an American screen and stage actor. He is best known for his television roles, including Dr. Neil Roberts on The O.C. (2004-2007), Phil Grey on Damages (2007-2011), Eli David in NCIS (2008-2013), Caleb Cortlandt on All My Children (2010-2011), and Bob Schwartz on Yellowstone (2018-2020). He is also known for his starring roles in the films Flashdance (1983) and The Hidden (1987), and has appeared in several Broadway and off-Broadway plays, including the original production of Victor/Victoria. He is a Saturn Award and Daytime Emmy Award nominee.

== Early life ==
Nouri was born in Washington, D.C. to Gloria (née Montgomery) and Edmond Nouri. Edmond was an Iraqi immigrant from Baghdad who arrived in the United States on a Georgetown University scholarship, enlisted in the U.S. Army during World War II, and became a writer for Stars and Stripes and The New Yorker.

== Career ==
After starring in an off-Broadway production of The Crucible, Nouri landed his first Broadway role in Forty Carats, which ran for two years. He made his film debut in 1969 with an uncredited role in Goodbye, Columbus. He appeared on several television soap operas and was nominated for a Daytime Emmy Award for his role as Steve Kaslo on Search for Tomorrow. Nouri portrayed Lucky Luciano in the miniseries The Gangster Chronicles and its theatrically released feature film Gangster Wars. In 1979, he appeared in the episode "The Curse of Dracula" of the series Cliffhangers.

In 1983, he had a starring role as Nick Hurley in the romantic drama Flashdance. Despite mixed reviews, the film was one of the highest-grossing films of 1983 and was nominated for several top awards, winning an Academy Award for Best Original Song.

Nouri has appeared in numerous television series and television films. He starred opposite Kyle MacLachlan in the horror film The Hidden. He starred on the short-lived series Bay City Blues and Downtown, and on the sitcom Love & War. Nouri also starred in the Broadway production of the musical Victor/Victoria as King Marchan opposite Julie Andrews. He appeared in three separate entries of Law & Order, each time in different roles. He had recurring roles on the series The O.C., Damages, NCIS, and Army Wives. Nouri returned to soap operas with a year-long stint on All My Children. More recently, he had a recurring role on the series Yellowstone for three seasons.

== Personal life ==
Nouri has been married and divorced twice. His first marriage was to Lynn Goldsmith and his second marriage was to Vicki Light. He has two daughters. He is an ambassador of the National Multiple Sclerosis Society as a result of one of his ex-wives being affected by the condition.

Nouri also had relationships with Dyan Cannon and Roma Downey.

== Filmography ==
=== Film ===
Year	Title	Role
1969	Goodbye, Columbus	Don Farber (uncredited)
1981	Gangster Wars	Charles "Lucky" Luciano
1983	Flashdance	Nick Hurley
1986	The Imagemaker	Roger Blackwell
1986	GoBots: Battle of the Rock Lords	Boulder (voice)
1987	The Hidden	Detective Thomas Beck
1988	Thieves of Fortune	Comandante Juan Luis Ferreira
1990	Little Vegas	Frank de Carlo
1990	Captain America	Lieutenant Colonel Louis
1990	Fatal Sky	Jeff Milker
1991	The Psychic	Theodore "Ted" Steering
1991	Total Exposure	Dave Murphy
1992	Black Ice	Ben Shorr
1993	DaVinci's War	Thomas "China" Smith
1993	American Yakuza	Dino Campanela
1993	No Escape, No Return	Dante
1994	Fortunes of War	Father Aran
1994	Inner Sanctum 2	Bill Reed
1994	Lady In Waiting	Jimmy Scavetti
1995	Hologram Man	Edward Jameson
1995	To the Limit	Thomas "China" Smith
1996	Overkill	Lloyd Wheeler
2000	Finding Forrester	Dr. Spence
2001	Carman: The Champion	Freddie
2001	Lovely & Amazing	Dr. Crane
2002	Terminal Error	Brad Weston
2003	Klepto	Dr. Cohn
2003	Stuey	Vincent
2004	The Terminal	Max
2005	Searching for Bobby D	Angelo
2005	Boynton Beach Club	Donald
2006	Last Holiday	Congressman Stewart
2006	Invincible	Leonard Tose
2009	The Proposal	Chairman Bergen
2012	Any Day Now	Miles Dubrow
2015	The Squeeze	Jimmy Diamonds
2016	Teleios	Nordham
2017	Alex & the List	Rabbi Baskin
2017	Woman Walks Ahead	Karl Valentine
2018	Con Man	Uncle Joe
2025	Hurricanna	The Ex

=== Television ===
Year	Title	Role	Notes
1974–1975	Somerset	Tom Conway	Main cast
1975	Beacon Hill	Giorgio Bullock	Main cast; season 1
1975–1978	Search for Tomorrow	Steve Kaslo	Main cast
1977	Contract on Cherry Street	Lou Savage	Television film
1979	The Curse of Dracula	Count Dracula	Main cast; season 1
1979	The Last Convertible	Jean RGR des Barres	Miniseries; 3 episodes
1980	Nick and the Dobermans	Nick Macazie	Television film
1980	Fun and Games	Greg	Television film
1981	The Gangster Chronicles	Charles "Lucky" Luciano	Miniseries; 13 episodes
1983	Secrets of a Mother and Daughter	Alex Shepherd	Television film
1983–1984	Bay City Blues	Joe Rohner	Main cast; season 1
1984	Spraggue	Michael Spraggue	Television film
1985	Star Fairies	Giant (voice)	Television film
1986	Between Two Women	Harry Petherton	Television film
1986	Rage of Angels: The Story Continues	James Moretti	Television film
1986–1987	Downtown	Detective John Forney	Main cast; season 1
1988	Quiet Victory: The Charlie Wedemeyer Story	Charlie Wedemeyer	Television film
1990	Shattered Dreams	John Fedders	Television film
1991	Changes	Peter Hallam	Television film
1992	In the Arms of a Killer	Brian Venible	Television film
1992	Exclusive	Reed Pierce	Television film
1992	The Sands of Time	Jaime Miro	Television film
1992	The Final Contract	David Sloane	Television film
1992–1995	Love & War	Kip Zakaris	Main cast; Seasons 1-3
1994	Eyes of Terror	Lieutenant David Zaccariah	Television film
1995	Between Love & Honor	Joe "Crazy Joe" Gallo	Television film
1995	Burke's Law	Judd Timmons	Episode: "Who Killed the Tennis Ace?"
1995	Victor/Victoria	King Marchand	Television film
1997	Law & Order	Dr. Michael Cosgrove	Episode: "Harvest"
1998	This Matter of Marriage	Adam Barr	Television film
1998	Style & Substance	Jeff Dennis	Episode: "Chelsea's First Date"
1998	Early Edition	Stanley Hollenbeck	Episode: "Nest Egg"
1999	Too Rich: The Secret Life of Doris Duke	Porfirio Rubirosa	Television film
1999	Law & Order: Special Victims Unit	Dallas Warner	Episode: "A Single Life"
2000–2003	Touched by an Angel	Greg Sawyer / Carl Northum	2 episodes
2001	Second Honeymoon	Phillip	Television film
2001	Gideon's Crossing	Cardiologist	2 episodes
2001	61*	Joe DiMaggio	Television film
2003	The District	FBI Agent Spencer	Episode: "Sacrifices"
2003	The Lyon's Den	Simon Freed	Episode: "Beach House"
2003–2007	Law & Order: Criminal Intent	Henry Webster / Elder Roberts	2 episodes
2004	The Practice	Dwight Haber	Episode: "Avenging Angels"
2004	The West Wing	Senator Roy Turner	Episode: "Slow News Day"
2004	Cold Case	Kyle Silver	Episode: "Maternal Instincts"
2004	Medical Investigation	Wes Douglas	Episode: "You're Not Alone"
2004	The Young and the Restless	Elliot Hampton	17 episodes
2004	Star Trek: Enterprise	Syrran / Arev	Episode: "The Forge"
2004–2007	The O.C.	Dr. Neil Roberts	Guest; season 1-2, main cast; season 3, recurring; season 4
2006	South Beach	Warren Stella	Episode: "Who Do You Trust"
2006	CSI: NY	Denney Lancaster	Episode: "People with Money"
2007	Brothers & Sisters	Milo Peterman	3 episodes
2007	Without a Trace	Byron Carlton	Episode: "Run"
2007–2011	Damages	Phil Grey	Recurring cast; season 1-4
2008	Privileged	Miles Franklin	Episode: "All About Love, Actually"
2008–2013	NCIS	Mossad Director Eli David	Recurring cast; season 6-10
2009	Crash	Wesley Thigpen	2 episodes
2010	Legend of the Seeker	Frederick Amnell	Episode: "Bound"
2009–2010	Army Wives	General Ludwig	Recurring cast; season 4
2010–2011	All My Children	Caleb Cortlandt	Main cast
2011	House	Thad Barton	Episode: "Risky Business"
2012	Dark Desire	Phil	Television film
2013	Body of Proof	Daniel Russo	Episode: "Mob Mentality"
2013	Hunt for the Labyrinth Killer	Galen Anderson	Television film
2013	Major Crimes	Congressman Steven Keller	Episode: "Risk Assessment"
2014	The Exes	James Malcolm	Episode "The Old Man & the Holly"
2014	Taken Away	Senator Worthington	Television film
2015	The Slap	Thanassis	Miniseries; 5 episodes
2015	Chicago P.D.	Carlo Tafani	Episode: "Never Forget I Love You"
2016	Blue Bloods	Nick Constantine	Episode "Town Without Pity"
2016	Heartbeat	Gérard Panttiere	Episode: "Match Game"
2017	Manhunt: Unabomber	Bob Guccione	Episode: "Publish or Perish"
2018	The Assassination of Gianni Versace: American Crime Story	Norman Blachford	2 episodes
2018	Great Performances	Himself	Episode: "Ellis Island: The Dream of America" with Pacific Symphony"
2018–2020	Yellowstone	Bob Schwartz	Recurring cast; season 1-3
2019	Devils	Jeremy Stonehouse	Recurring
2019	NCIS: New Orleans	Jason Campbell	Guest Star
2020	Hawaii Five-0	Oscar Hirsch	Episode: "He puhe'e miki"
2022	The Watcher	Roger Kaplan	Recurring
2025	The Pitt	Nathaniel Montrose	2 episodes
2026	The Rookie	Pierre	1 episode

== Stage (partial) ==
Year	Title	Role	Theatre	Notes
1968-70	Forty Carats	Pat/Peter Latham (replacement)	Morosco Theatre	Also assistant stage manager
1977	Nefertiti	Hapi	Blackstone Theatre	
1982	Booth	Edwin Booth	South Street Theatre	
1995-97	Victor/Victoria	King Marchan	Marquis Theatre	
2000	Call Me Madam	Cosmo Constantine	Ralph Freud Playhouse	Reprise! Los Angeles
2001	South Pacific	Emile de Beque	Ordway Center for the Performing Arts	
2001-02	South Pacific	Emile de Beque	National tour	
2003	Camille Claudel	Auguste Rodin	Terris Theatre	Goodspeed Musicals
2004	Can-Can	Aristide Forestier	New York City Center	Encores!

== Awards and nominations ==
=== Daytime Emmy Award ===
- 1976 Daytime Emmy Award for Outstanding Lead Actor in a Drama Series: Search for Tomorrow (nominated)

=== Saturn Awards ===
- 1988 Saturn Award for Best Actor: The Hidden (nominated)

=== Sitges Film Festival ===
- 1987 Sitges Film Festival Best Actor: The Hidden (won)
