= Ed Ryan (American football) =

Canadian-American football player (1925–2002)

No. 46
- Positions: End, defensive end

Personal information
- Born: December 29, 1925; Banff, Alberta, Canada
- Died: October 21, 2002 (aged 76); San Carlos, California, U.S.
- Listed height: 6 ft 2 in (1.88 m)
- Listed weight: 215 lb (98 kg)

Career information
- College: Saint Mary's
- NFL draft: 1948: 9th round, 73rd overall pick

Career history
- Pittsburgh Steelers (1948)

Awards and highlights
- First-team All-PCC (1945)

Career NFL statistics
- Games played: 9
- Games started: 2
- Stats at Pro Football Reference

Edward Denis Ryan (December 29, 1925 – October 21, 2002) was an American football defensive end in the National Football League (NFL). He played one season with the Pittsburgh Steelers (1948). Ryan grew up in Vancouver, British Columbia and attended college at Saint Mary's College of California. In 1948, he was drafted by the Steelers, 73rd overall, becoming one of the first Canadians ever drafted in the NFL. He went on to play nine games that season, his only season in the NFL.
