= Ralph Heywood =

American football player (1921–2007)

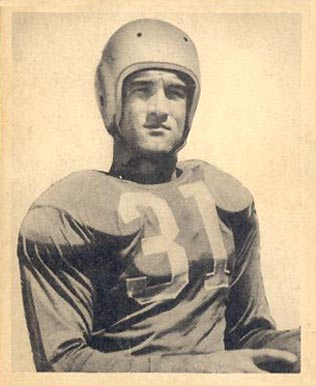
- Heywood on a 1948 Bowman football card

No. 57, 31, 80, 83
- Positions: End, defensive end

Personal information
- Born: September 11, 1921; Los Angeles, California, U.S.
- Died: April 10, 2007 (aged 85); Bandera, Texas, U.S.
- Listed height: 6 ft 2 in (1.88 m)
- Listed weight: 203 lb (92 kg)

Career information
- High school: Huntington Park (Huntington Park, California)
- College: USC
- NFL draft: 1944: 3rd round, 19th overall pick

Career history
- Chicago Rockets (1946); Detroit Lions (1947–1948); Boston Yanks (1948); New York Bulldogs (1949)

Awards and highlights
- Consensus All-American (1943); First-team All-PCC (1943); Second-team All-PCC (1942)

Career NFL/AAFC statistics
- Receptions: 84
- Receiving yards: 1,192
- Total touchdowns: 13
- Military career
- Allegiance: United States of America
- Branch: U.S. Marine Corps
- Service years: 1941–1946, 1952-1974
- Rank: Colonel
- Unit: USS Iowa
- Commands: 26th Marines Regiment
- Conflicts: World War II; Korean War; Vietnam War
- Stats at Pro Football Reference

Ralph Alvin Heywood (September 11, 1921 – April 10, 2007) was an American professional American football player in the National Football League (NFL) and the All-America Football Conference (AAFC). He played college football for the USC Trojans, earning consensus All-American in 1943. Heywood, along with Harry Marker, are the only NFL players to serve in World War II, the Korean War, and the Vietnam War.

== Biography ==
Born in Los Angeles, California, and raised during the Great Depression, Heywood received a football scholarship to attend college at the University of Southern California (USC). Despite having football scholarship, he took a job as a busboy at a sorority house, while attending USC. As two-way end, he was a captain on the 1943 USC team that finished with an 8–2 record. He was unable to play in USC's a 29–0 win over Washington in the Rose Bowl, due to being drafted into the United States Marine Corps and sent to the South Pacific Ocean to serve on the USS Iowa. In his absence he was awarded an All-America honors as an end and punter in 1943, despite playing in only 5 games that season. Heywood initially enlisted in the Marine Corps in 1943 to fight in World War II. He entered the V-12 program, which was initiated to meet the increased need for Navy and Marine Corps officers, allowed him to stay in school while learning the military basics. The program allowed officer candidates to attend civilian schools while in an enlisted status in the Navy or Marine Corps. However, he was shipped off to the USS Iowa, before he had a chance to graduate. In prior years, he led the Trojans in receiving yards in 1942 and 1943, and had the school's first-ever 100-yard receiving game when he gained 101 yards on 4 receptions versus St. Mary's Pre-Flight in 1943. He also led USC in punting in 1941 and 1942.

After his initial discharge from the Marines following World War II, Heywood completed his degree in cinematography at USC. When he left USC for the war, he was eight units short of graduating. However, the university awarded him 10 units in military science, based on his service, allowing him to graduate. He then played for the Chicago Rockets, of the All-America Football Conferences in 1946. In 1947 he moved to the NFL, playing the next two season for the Detroit Lions. The Lions had originally selected Heywood in the 1944 NFL draft while he was still at fighting in the war. In 1948, he played for the Boston Yanks and the New York Bulldogs in 1949.

In 1952, during the Korean War, he returned to active duty. He later commanded the 26th Marine Regiment in South Vietnam. He rose to the rank of colonel and was discharged from the Marines in 1974. After retiring from active duty, Heywood became the Commandant of the Marine Military Academy, located in Harlingen, Texas. He played tennis with Charlton Heston and was a golf buddy of Bob Hope. On August 9, 2004, Heywood made an appearance, when he delivered the game ball at the Pro Football Hall of Fame Game, between the Washington Redskins and Denver Broncos.

On April 10, 2007, Heywood died in Bandera, Texas, while laying in the arms of his wife, Suzie, as she softly sang to him. During a ceremony on January 25, 2013, he was inducted into the Marine Corps Sports Hall of Fame.
