= Jake Leicht =

American football player (1919–1992)

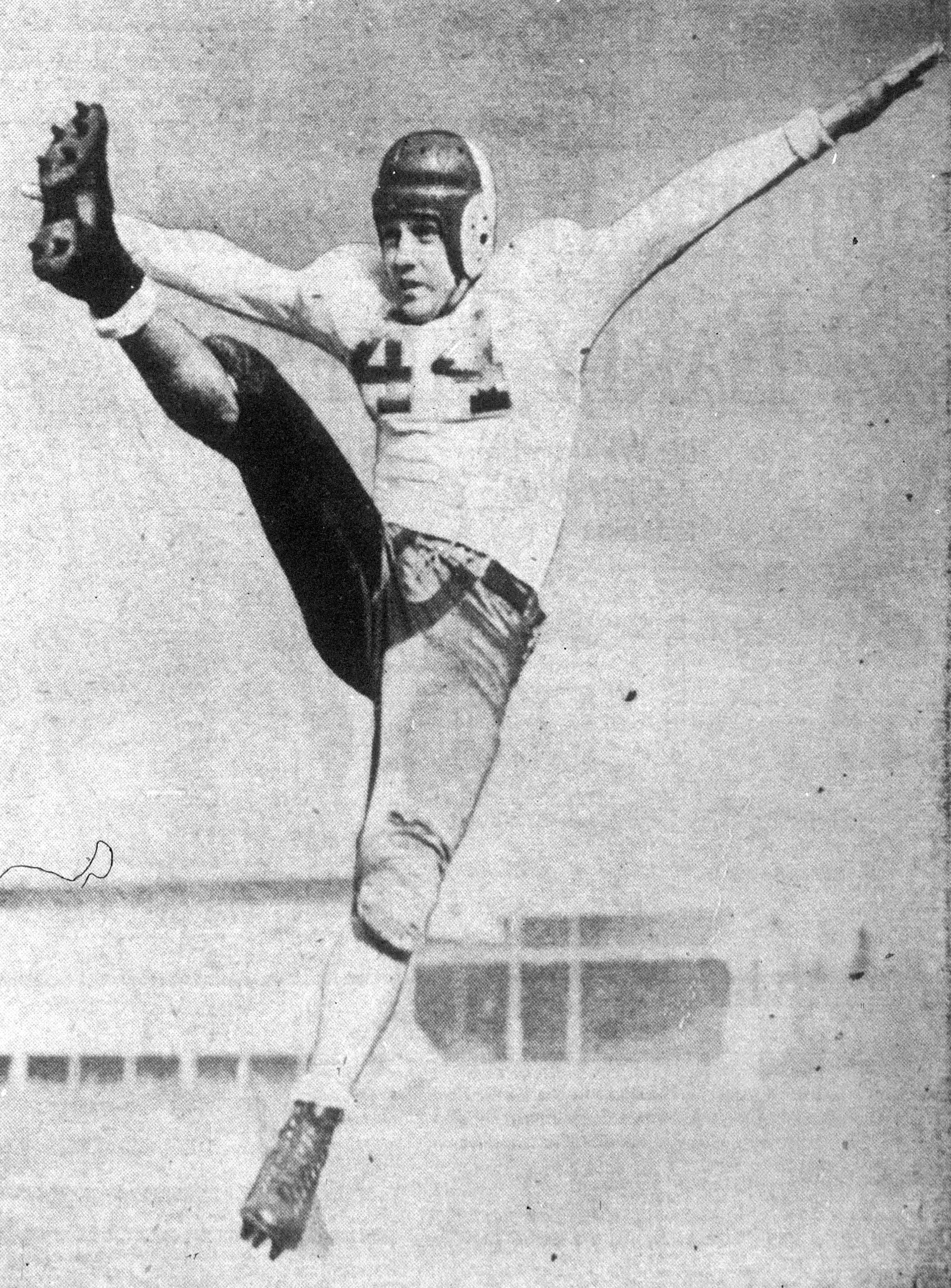
- Leicht, circa 1945

No. 81
- Positions: Halfback, defensive back

Personal information
- Born: August 2, 1919; Jamestown, North Dakota, U.S.
- Died: May 18, 1992 (aged 72); Medford, Oregon, U.S.
- Listed height: 5 ft 9 in (1.75 m)
- Listed weight: 170 lb (77 kg)

Career information
- High school: Stockton (Stockton, California)
- College: Oregon (1945-1947)
- NFL draft: 1946: 10th round, 89th overall pick

Career history
- Baltimore Colts (1948-1949)

Awards and highlights
- Second-team All-American (1947); 2× First-team All-PCC (1945, 1947); Second-team All-PCC (1946)

Career AAFC statistics
- Rushing yards: 81
- Rushing average: 3.1
- Receptions: 13
- Receiving yards: 146
- Total touchdowns: 2
- Stats at Pro Football Reference

Jacob Leicht (August 2, 1919 – May 18, 1992) was an American football halfback in the All-America Football Conference (AAFC) for the Baltimore Colts. He played college football at the University of Oregon and was drafted in the tenth round of the 1946 NFL draft by the Washington Redskins.

== See also ==
- List of NCAA major college yearly punt and kickoff return leaders
