= Bill Ward (American football) =

American football player (1921–1992)

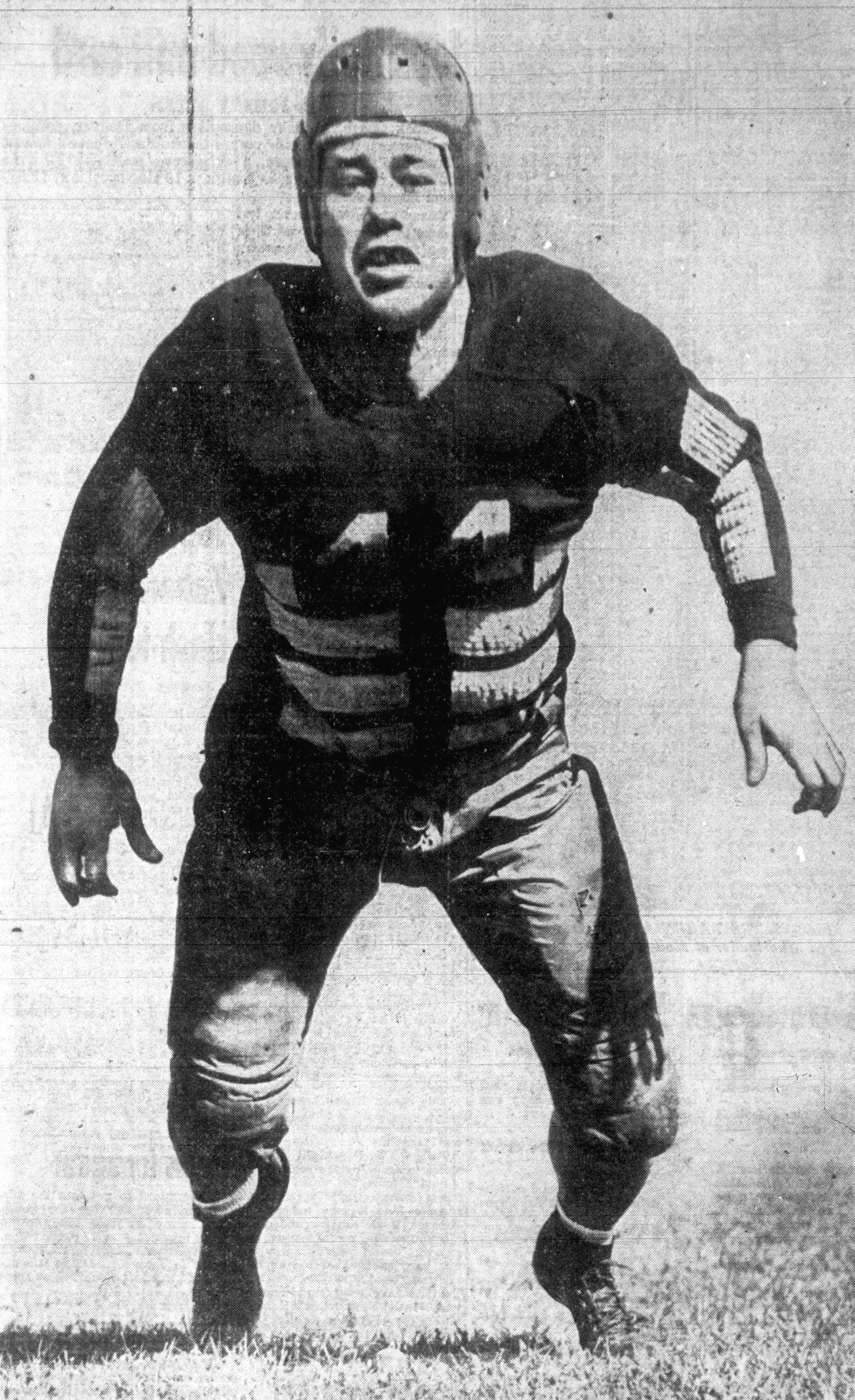
- Ward, circa 1942

No. 21
- Position: Guard

Personal information
- Born: February 19, 1921; Sequim, Washington, U.S.
- Died: December 3, 1992 (aged 71)

Career information
- High school: Sequim (WA)
- College: Washington; Washington State

Career history
- Washington Redskins (1946–1947); Detroit Lions (1947–1949)

Awards and highlights
- First-team All-PCC (1943)

Career statistics
- Games played: 44
- Fumbles recovered: 5
- Stats at Pro Football Reference

William Clark Ward (February 19, 1921 – December 3, 1992) was an American football guard in the National Football League (NFL) for the Washington Redskins and the Detroit Lions. He attended the University of Washington and Washington State University.

He taught Traffic Safety for many years at Bellingham High School in Bellingham, Washington.
