= Bob Hendren =

American football player (1923–1999)

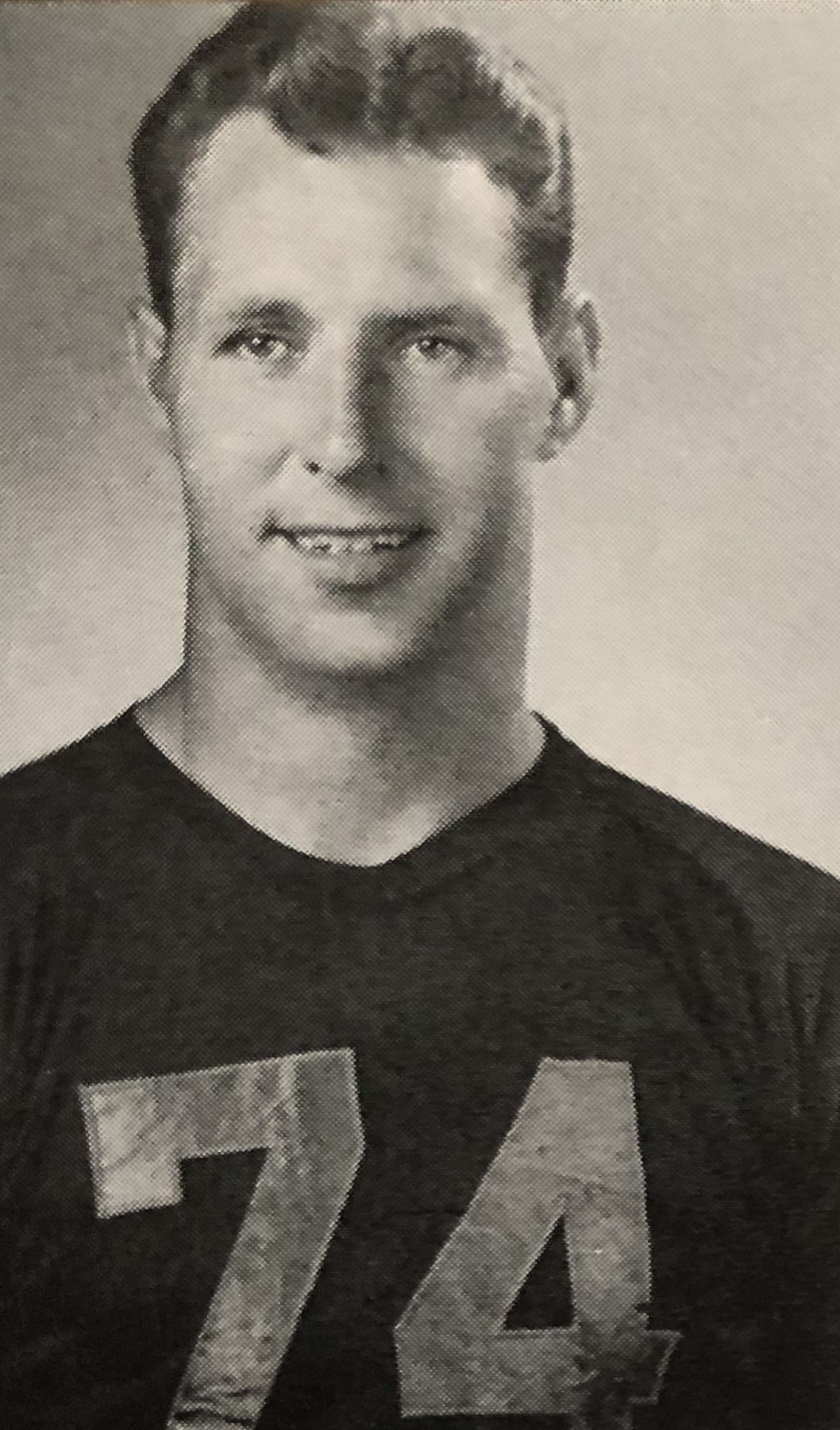
- Hendren at USC c. 1948

No. 48
- Position: Offensive tackle

Personal information
- Born: August 10, 1923; Burlington Junction, Missouri, U.S.
- Died: March 5, 1999 (aged 75)
- Listed height: 6 ft 8 in (2.03 m)
- Listed weight: 244 lb (111 kg)

Career information
- College: USC; Culver-Stockton
- NFL draft: 1946: 9th round, 59th overall pick

Career history
- Washington Redskins (1949–1951)

Awards and highlights
- First-team All-PCC (1947)

Career NFL statistics
- Games played: 36
- Games started: 1
- Fumble recoveries: 2
- Stats at Pro Football Reference

Robert Gerald Hendren (August 10, 1923 – March 5, 1999) was an American professional football offensive tackle in the National Football League (NFL) for the Washington Redskins. He played college football at the University of Southern California and was drafted in the ninth round (59th overall) of the 1946 NFL draft.

== Early life ==
Hendren attended Clarinda High School. He enrolled at Culver-Stockton College, before transferring to the University of Southern California. He was one of the stars of the 1948 East-West Shrine Game in San Francisco.

== Professional career ==
Hendren was selected by the Washington Redskins in the seventh round (59th overall) of the 1946 NFL draft. He played three seasons in the NFL.

== Note ==
His 1949 Leaf football card has a misspelled last name, shown as Hendreen.
