= Brother Future =

1991 film by Roy Campanella II

- Directed by: Roy Campanella II
- Written by: Ann E. Eskridge
- Produced by: Wayne Morris
- Starring: Phill Lewis; Carl Lumbly; Moses Gunn; Akosua Busia; Frank Converse; Vonetta McGee
- Music by: Stephen James Taylor
- Release date: February 3, 1991 (U.S.)
- Running time: 103 minutes
- Country: United States

Brother Future is a historical period/ coming of age movie made in 1991. It starred Phill Lewis, Moses Gunn, Frank Converse, Carl Lumbly and Vonetta McGee. A street kid (Phill Lewis) from Detroit, Michigan, is hit by a car; when he awakes, he finds himself a slave in South Carolina in 1822. The boy then has to help his fellow slaves so he can return to his own time. Roy Campanella II directed this made-for-TV movie. Music by Stephen James Taylor.

== Plot ==
The movie begins with TJ (Phill Lewis), a high school student from Detroit, selling stolen items to other members of his neighborhood. Upon returning to class, TJ finds he has to write a paper on a famous black person for his Black History class. TJ is later seen selling more stolen material while talking to his friend, but a police officer starts to chase him. While running, TJ gets hit by a car and is knocked unconscious.

When TJ awakens, he finds himself in 1822 in South Carolina, right next to an exceptionally large tree. Thinking that he is a runaway slave, TJ is brought to a slave auction and is sold to a man named Mr. Cooper. TJ then has to work on Mr. Cooper's plantation, and gets himself into all sorts of mischief.

While getting Zeke's (the black slave driver) food from Cooper's house, TJ runs into a house slave, Martilla, who also happens to be a palm reader. She tells TJ that to return to his own time, he must help another slave and then find the big tree which he was next to when he woke up after being hit by the car. After trying to help his fellow slaves with their chores, TJ becomes frustrated and attempts to run away. Unfortunately, he is stopped by Zeke, who then whips him.

Back at the plantation, TJ helps one of his fellow slaves, Josiah, learn to read. He shows Josiah how to write his name, and they read out of a book that Josiah stole from Cooper. To try to get Zeke in trouble with Cooper, he places the book in Zeke's house. Cooper finds the book, but also finds a piece of paper in the book in which Josiah had practiced writing his name. Josiah is then whipped to such an extent that he cannot move.

Due to Josiah's inability to move, he tells TJ to find Denmark Vesey and tell him about what happened. TJ does as he is told, and when he returns TJ tells Josiah what Vesey has told him. Josiah, TJ and Zeke have been asked to work at a party at Cooper's house serving food, but Josiah asks TJ to cover for him at seven o'clock as he is allied with Vesey and is part of Vesey's plan to rebel. Zeke overhears this and rushes to tell Cooper.

At the party, Zeke tells Cooper about what he has heard. TJ hears this and reports it to Josiah. The two then decide to escape. They also bring along Josiah's girlfriend Caroline. Cooper and Zeke chase after the trio. TJ decides to stall them and, while Josiah and Caroline escape, Cooper shoots TJ. He falls from the shot, right under the big tree. When awakened, TJ finds himself back in his own time, where he decides to do better at school. He learns that to help yourself you sometimes have to help others. He also returns with a new pride in his heritage. TJ learns to become better and wants to get better grades to stay out of trouble.

== Production ==
Ann E. Eskridge wrote the film's screenplay. Campanella said that is "was a huge battle" to complete the film, and that he began on the project when it arrived as a low quality screenplay. The original screenplay had the main character be portrayed as a joke, and the director said that no one would care about the character even as he learned a lesson. Campanella worked on making the film into something that all youth would enjoy, with particularly black young people. He said that the process was a "satisfying experience".

== Release ==
The film originally aired on PBS as part of its WonderWorks series. The original video release included a guide about Denmark Vesey's failed attempt at slave insurrection along with suggested books on related subjects. It was released on DVD in 2005 by Feature Films for Families.

== Reception ==
Lynn Heffley of the Los Angeles Times said, "Trapped like an animal and auctioned to the highest bidder, T.J. learns just what slavery--and manhood--mean, in Brother Future, a remarkable, funny and poignant Wonderworks family movie." Heffley also complimented the performance of Phill Lewis by saying, that he was "one of the best young actors around, makes true the transition from hot-shot kid to strong, compassionate man, without losing the essence of T.J.’s humor and drive." A Parent's Guide to the Best Children's Videos and Where to Find Them stated, "While Brother Future is not exactly history, it does accurately present information often admitted from books and lessons: the courage and rebellion of slaves." Scott Williams, of The Associated Press wrote, "It's a treat to watch Lewis's flashy, impulsive T.J. evolve into a sympathetic character. In fact, it's a pleasure to watch all of the principals at work in this emotionally demanding movie."

Lisa Woolfork wrote an analysis of the film in the book Embodying American Slavery in Contemporary Culture. The book Transatlantic Memories of Slavery: Remembering the Past, Changing the Future said that Brother Future and similar films "were also efforts to preserve memory of the past while in generations increasingly willing to unburden themselves of their racial heritage."

== Awards ==
Brother Future was nominated for a Daytime Emmy in 1991 for Outstanding Achievement in Musical Direction. The film won a DGA Award for "Outstanding Directorial Achievement in Dramatic Shows – Daytime" in 1992. It also won awards from CEBA and the National Black Programming Consortium.

== See also ==
- List of films featuring slavery
