= Kyle Chandler =

American actor (born 1965)

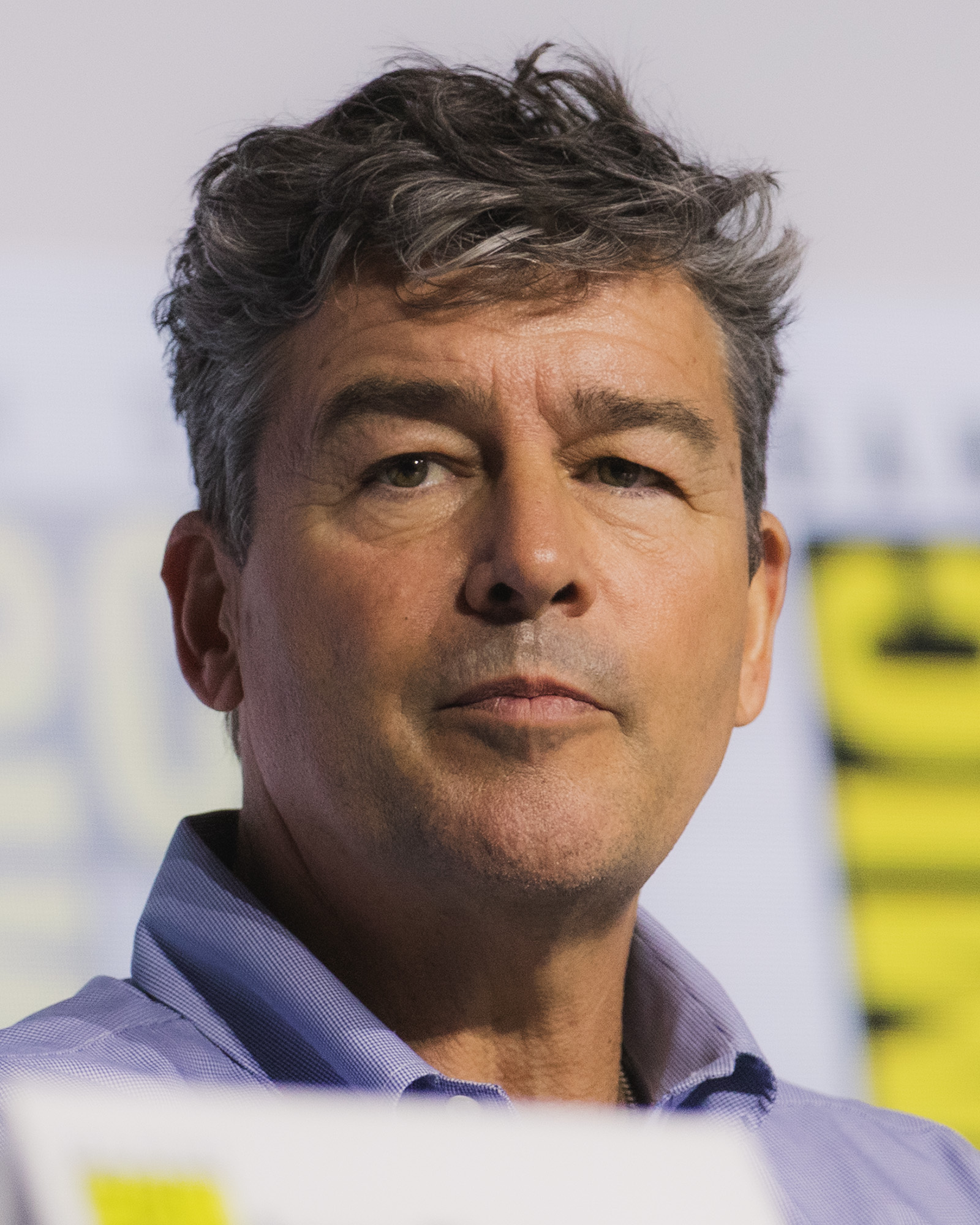
- Chandler in 2026
- Born: Kyle Martin Chandler; September 17, 1965 (age 61); Buffalo, New York, U.S.
- Education: George Walton Academy
- Occupation: Actor
- Years active: 1986–present
- Spouse: Kathryn Macquarrie (m. 1995)
- Children: 2, including Sydney

Kyle Martin Chandler (born September 17, 1965) is an American actor. He received critical acclaim for his performance as Eric Taylor in the NBC series Friday Night Lights (2006–2011), winning the Primetime Emmy Award for Outstanding Lead Actor in a Drama Series in 2011.

Making his screen acting debut in the 1988 television film Quiet Victory: The Charlie Wedemeyer Story, Chandler's first regular television role was in the ABC drama Homefront (1991–1993). This was followed by the lead role of Gary Hobson in the CBS series Early Edition (1996–2000). His guest appearance on the medical drama Grey's Anatomy (2006–2007), earned Chandler his first Primetime Emmy Award nomination.

Chandler's film work includes supporting roles in King Kong (2005), The Day the Earth Stood Still (2008), Super 8 (2011), Argo, Zero Dark Thirty (both 2012), The Wolf of Wall Street (2013), Carol (2015), Manchester by the Sea (2016), Game Night and First Man (both 2018), Godzilla: King of the Monsters (2019), and Godzilla vs. Kong (2021). Chandler starred in the Netflix thriller series Bloodline (2015–2017), for which he received additional Primetime Emmy Award nominations. Chandler portrays Hal Jordan / Green Lantern in the DC Universe / HBO television series Lanterns (2026).

== Early life ==
Chandler was born on September 17, 1965, in Buffalo, New York, the fourth child of Edward Chandler, a pharmaceutical sales representative, and his wife, Sally Jeanette (née Meyer), a dog breeder. Chandler has three siblings. Chandler was raised Catholic. He stopped attending church after his father's death in 1980. He grew up in suburban Lake Forest, Illinois, until he was 11 years old, when his family moved to a small farm in Loganville, Georgia. Chandler's mother raised Great Danes for show dogs; he travelled with his parents to dog shows as a child and helped out at their dog boarding kennel. Chandler's widowed mother ran the business Sheenwater Kennels to support Chandler and his siblings. She "was highly active with the Great Dane Club of America (GDCA) as a breeder, judge and championship prize winner."

Chandler graduated from George Walton Academy in nearby Monroe, Georgia in 1983. As a freshman at Walton, he was a member of the 1979 state championship football team. He left the team the following year, aged 14, after his father died of a heart attack. He participated in the theatre program at Walton after quitting football. After graduating from high school, Chandler attended the University of Georgia, where he was a drama major and member of the class of 1984 Sigma Nu fraternity. In 1988, seven credits short of a bachelor's degree in drama, Chandler dropped out of college to pursue a television deal.

== Career ==
=== 1988–2006: Early career ===
In 1988, Chandler was signed by the American Broadcasting Company and brought to Hollywood as part of ABC's new talent program. He made his television film debut that same year as a supporting hero actor in Quiet Victory: The Charlie Wedemeyer Story. Also in 1988, Chandler studied with acting teacher Milton Katselas. His first major acting experience was a supporting role on television as Army Private William Griner in Tour of Duty. In eight episodes of the last season of the series, he played a member of a special operations squad fighting in Vietnam.

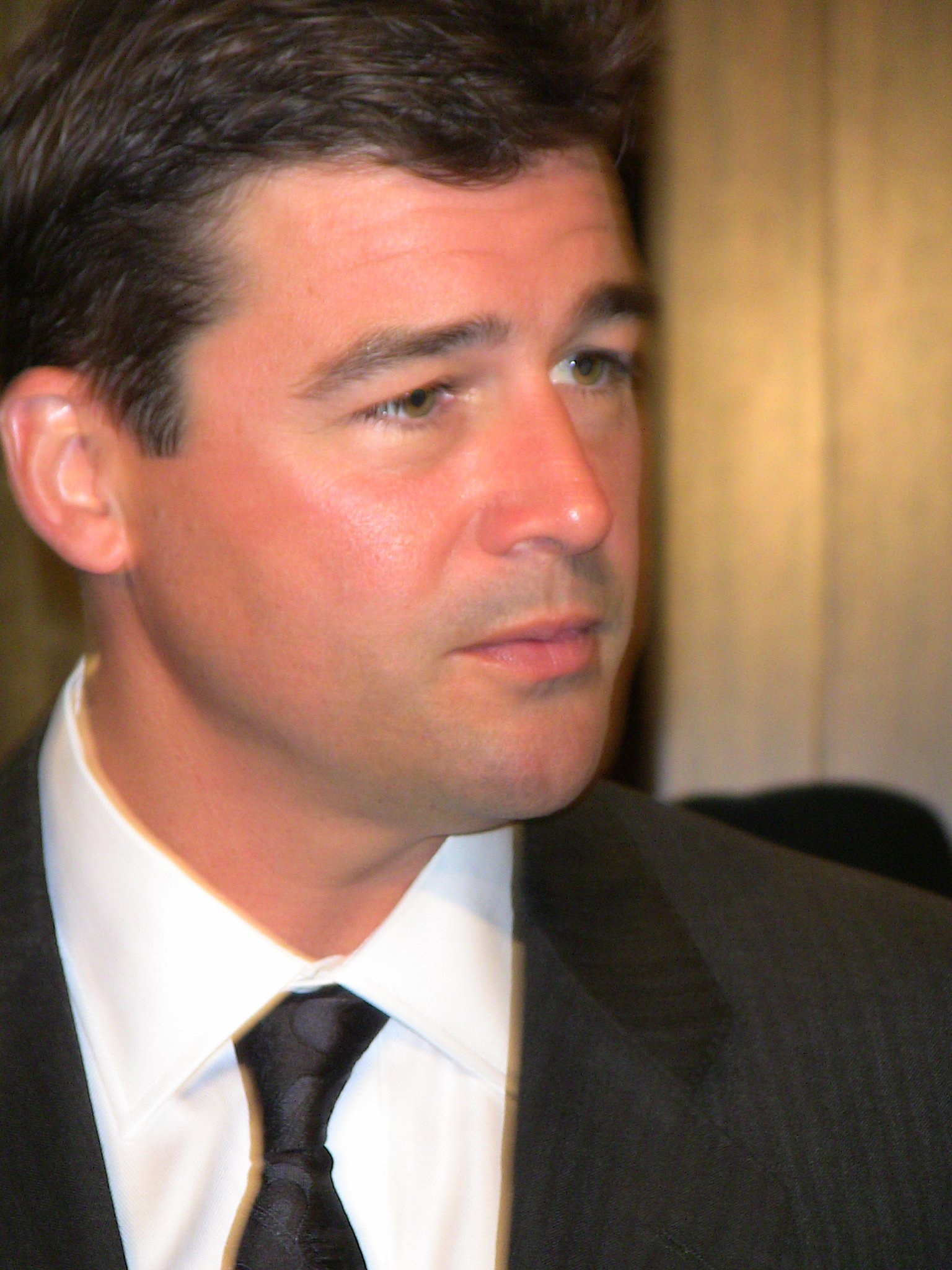
Chandler at the Making Magic Happy event in Beverly Hills, December 2008

Chandler made his film debut in one of the key roles in the 1992 George Strait film Pure Country. From 1991 to 1993, he had a series regular role as Cleveland Indians right fielder Jeff Metcalf in the ABC series Homefront, a drama set in the post-World War II era in the fictional town of River Run, Ohio. Homefront ran for two seasons, with Chandler appearing in all 42 episodes.

In 1994, he made his Broadway debut, co-starring with Ashley Judd, in a revival of William Inge's Picnic at the Roundabout Theatre Company. From 1996 to 2000, Chandler starred as the lead character in the CBS series Early Edition, as a man who had the ability to change future disasters. He portrayed bar owner Gary Hobson, a stockbroker turned hero who received "tomorrow's newspaper today". In 1996, he received the Saturn Award for Best Actor on Television for his portrayal of Hobson. Chandler was featured in all 90 episodes of the series, which ran for four seasons. In 2001, he appeared opposite Joan Cusack as investment banker Jake Evans in one season of the ABC comedy series What About Joan.

In 2003, Chandler played scheming lawyer Grant Rashton in all six episodes of the short-lived NBC series The Lyon's Den, opposite Rob Lowe. Working again in film, Chandler played the 1930s Bruce Baxter in the 2005 film King Kong.

In February 2006, Chandler returned to television to guest star as the ill-fated bomb squad leader Dylan Young in two episodes of the ABC series Grey's Anatomy. The episodes, titled "It's the End of the World" and "As We Know It", followed Super Bowl XL. He received substantial praise for his performance and was nominated for the Outstanding Guest Actor in a Drama Series category at the 58th Primetime Emmy Awards. He appeared again on Grey's Anatomy, in the February 15, 2007 episode "Drowning on Dry Land", and the February 22, 2007 episode "Some Kind of Miracle".

=== 2006–2011: Friday Night Lights ===
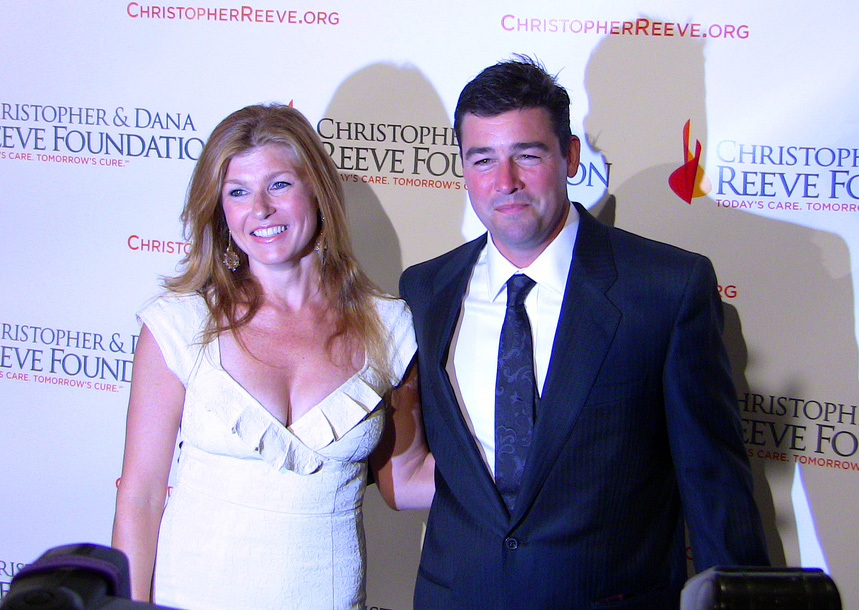
Chandler with his Friday Night Lights co-star Connie Britton in December 2008

While working on his Primetime Emmy Award-nominated guest role in Grey's Anatomy, Chandler met Peter Berg, who was developing a drama series Friday Night Lights, which followed the lives of a high school football coach, his family, and the players in a small Texas town. The series was inspired by Buzz Bissinger's book Friday Night Lights: A Town, a Team, and a Dream and the film Friday Night Lights. Chandler learned that he had been cast as high school football coach Eric Taylor when he was on Christmas vacation in 2005 with his family.

The show's pilot aired on NBC in 2006. While critically acclaimed, the series was at risk of cancellation each year. Starting with the third season in 2008, first-run episodes of the show were broadcast on DirecTV satellite channel The 101 Network before being repeated on NBC. The final season ended in 2011.

Chandler said that neither he nor Berg wanted him to play the role of Coach Taylor. And "while Chandler later changed his mind and decided he would be perfect for the role, Berg didn't see things his way: 'To this day he still says, I still didn't want you.'" Chandler won the Primetime Emmy Award for Outstanding Lead Actor in a Drama Series for his role in the final season of Friday Night Lights.

While shooting the series, Chandler also acted in some films. In 2007, he appeared in The Kingdom, which was directed by Friday Night Lights creator Berg, and in 2008, he appeared in The Day the Earth Stood Still as John Driscoll.

=== 2011–present: Film career and Lanterns ===
Chandler and Mark Wahlberg filming Broken City in November 2011

After Friday Night Lights ended, Chandler focused on film work. In 2011, he had a lead role in J. J. Abrams' science fiction film Super 8. The following year, he appeared in Argo. Chandler co-starred in Kathryn Bigelow's Zero Dark Thirty in 2012, playing the role of Joseph Bradley, an Islamabad CIA Station Chief.

In 2013, he had a supporting role in Broken City. Chandler appeared in The Wolf of Wall Street, also released in 2013, based on the memoir of Wall Street tycoon Jordan Belfort. It was nominated for five Academy Awards including Best Picture. Chandler played FBI agent Patrick Denham. That same year, he played a deadbeat alcoholic father in The Spectacular Now.

In 2015, Chandler co-starred in Todd Haynes' drama film Carol, portraying "a jealous husband" to his wife played by Cate Blanchett, who is revealed to be lesbian. Also in 2015, Chandler returned to television with the Netflix drama series Bloodline, for which he was nominated for a Primetime Emmy Award. The show premiered to positive reviews from critics, and ended after airing its third season. In the 2016 drama Manchester by the Sea, he played the main character's older brother.

Chandler played an investigator in Shawn Christensen's film The Vanishing of Sidney Hall (2017), and starred with Rachel McAdams and Jason Bateman in the comedy film Game Night (2018).

In 2019, he starred in Godzilla: King of the Monsters, a role he reprised in 2021's Godzilla vs. Kong. He portrayed Silicon Valley investor Bill Gurley in Showtime's Super Pumped.

In November 2022, Chandler played Peter in the Netflix film Slumberland.

In September 2024, Chandler was cast as Hal Jordan / Green Lantern in the DC Universe TV series Lanterns.

== Personal life ==
For nearly 20 years after beginning his acting career in the late 1980s, Chandler lived in Los Angeles. Since 2007, Chandler and his family have lived on a 33-acre spread in Dripping Springs, Texas, southwest of Austin, where they own several dogs and donkeys. Chandler's mother came to live with the family toward the end of her life, when she was living with Alzheimer's disease. She died in 2014.

Chandler serves as a volunteer firefighter. He participates in an annual charity golf tournament at Wolfdancer Golf Club (in Lost Pines, Texas) to raise funds for football players who have spinal cord injuries.

Chandler has been married to Kathryn Macquarrie since 1995. Chandler met his wife at a dog park in the mid-1990s. They have two daughters, including Sydney, who is an actress. Chandler and his daughter Sawyer have been active in trying to end the practice of shark finning.

== Filmography ==
=== Film ===
Year	Title	Role	Notes
1990	The Color of Evening	John	
1992	Pure Country	Buddy Jackson	
1996	Mulholland Falls	Captain	
1999	Angel's Dance	Tony Greco	
2005	King Kong	Bruce Baxter	
2007	The Kingdom	Francis Manner	
2008	The Day the Earth Stood Still	John Driscoll	
2010	Morning	Businessman	
2011	Super 8	Jack Lamb	
2012	Argo	Hamilton Jordan	
2012	Zero Dark Thirty	Joseph Bradley	
2013	Broken City	Paul Andrews	
2013	The Naughty List	Santa Claus	Voice
2013	The Spectacular Now	Tommy Keely	
2013	The Wolf of Wall Street	FBI Agent Patrick Denham	
2015	Carol	Harge Aird	
2016	Manchester by the Sea	Joe Chandler	
2017	The Vanishing of Sidney Hall	The Searcher	
2018	Game Night	Brooks Davis	
2018	First Man	Deke Slayton	
2019	Godzilla: King of the Monsters	Mark Russell	
2020	The Midnight Sky	Mitchell Rembshire	
2021	Godzilla vs. Kong	Mark Russell	
2022	Slumberland	Peter	
2025	Back in Action	Chuck	
2025	Anniversary	Paul Taylor	
2026	The Rip	DEA Agent Mateo "Matty" Nix	

=== Television ===
Year	Title	Role	Notes
1988	Quiet Victory: The Charlie Wedemeyer Story	Skinner	Television film
1989	Unconquered	1st Boy	Television film
1989	Home Fires Burning	Billy Benefield	Television film
1989	China Beach	Grunt	Episode: "Independence Day"
1989	Freddy's Nightmares	Chuck	Episode: "Memory Overload"
1990	Tour of Duty	William Griner	Recurring role, 8 episodes
1991–1993	Homefront	Jeff Metcalf	Main role
1994	North and South Book III: Heaven and Hell	Charles Main	3 episodes
1995	Sleep, Baby, Sleep	Peter Walker	Television film
1995	Convict Cowboy	Clay Treyton	Television film
1996–2000	Early Edition	Gary Hobson	Main role
2000–2001	What About Joan?	Jake Evans	Main role
2003	The Lyon's Den	Grant Rashton	Main role
2003	And Starring Pancho Villa as Himself	Raoul Walsh	Television film
2004	Capital City	Mac McGinty	Unsold television pilot
2005	Lies and the Wives We Tell Them To	Cooper	Unsold television pilot
2006–2007	Grey's Anatomy	Dylan Young	4 episodes
2006–2011	Friday Night Lights	Eric Taylor	Main role
2008	King of the Hill	Tucker Mardell	Voice; Episode: "The Courtship of Joseph's Father"
2011–2014	Robot Chicken	Various voices	2 episodes
2013	The Vatican	Cardinal Thomas Duffy	Unsold television pilot
2013	A Monstrous Holiday	Coach	Voice, television film
2014	American Dad!	Coach Keegan	Voice; Episode: "Introducing The Naughty Stewardesses"
2015–2017	Bloodline	John Rayburn	Main role
2016	Family Guy	Coach Doyle	Voice; Episode: "Bookie of the Year"
2019	Catch-22	Colonel Cathcart	Miniseries
2021	Star Wars: Visions	Mitaka	Voice; Episode: T0-B1 (English dub)
2021	Mayor of Kingstown	Mitch McClusky	Episode: "The Mayor of Kingstown"
2022	Super Pumped	Bill Gurley	Main role; 7 episodes
2022	The Boss Baby: Back in the Crib	Ranger Safety Binkerton	Voice; Episode: "Sitting Ducks"
2026	Lanterns	Hal Jordan / Green Lantern	Lead role

=== Video games ===
Year	Title	Role	Notes
2005	Peter Jackson's King Kong	Bruce Baxter	Likeness only

=== Theater ===
- Picnic (1994) at Criterion Center Stage Right, as Hal Carter

== Awards and nominations ==
Year	Nominated work	Association	Category	Result
1997	Early Edition	Saturn Awards	Best Actor on Television	Won
2006	Grey's Anatomy	Primetime Emmy Awards	Outstanding Guest Actor in a Drama Series	Nominated
2007	Friday Night Lights	TCA Awards	Individual Achievement in Drama	Nominated
2010	Friday Night Lights	Primetime Emmy Awards	Outstanding Lead Actor in a Drama Series	Nominated
2010	Friday Night Lights	Satellite Awards	Best Actor – Television Series Drama	Nominated
2011	Friday Night Lights	Critics' Choice Television Awards	Best Actor in a Drama Series	Nominated
2011	Friday Night Lights	Primetime Emmy Awards	Outstanding Lead Actor in a Drama Series	Won
2011	Friday Night Lights	Satellite Awards	Best Actor – Television Series Drama	Nominated
2012	Friday Night Lights	Screen Actors Guild Awards	Outstanding Performance by a Male Actor in a Drama Series	Nominated
2012	Argo	Hollywood Film Awards	Best Cast	Won
2012	Argo	San Diego Film Critics Society Awards	Best Cast	Nominated
2013	Argo	Palm Springs International Film Festival	Best Cast	Won
2013	Argo	Screen Actors Guild Awards	Outstanding Performance by a Cast in a Motion Picture	Won
2015	Bloodline	Primetime Emmy Awards	Outstanding Lead Actor in a Drama Series	Nominated
2016	Bloodline	Satellite Awards	Best Actor – Television Series Drama	Nominated
2016	Bloodline	Primetime Emmy Awards	Outstanding Lead Actor in a Drama Series	Nominated
2016	Manchester by the Sea	Seattle Film Critics Awards	Best Supporting Actor	Nominated
2017	Manchester by the Sea	Screen Actors Guild Awards	Outstanding Performance by a Cast in a Motion Picture	Nominated
2017	Manchester by the Sea	Critics' Choice Movie Awards	Best Acting Ensemble	Nominated
