= Al Sparlis =

American football player (1920–2005)

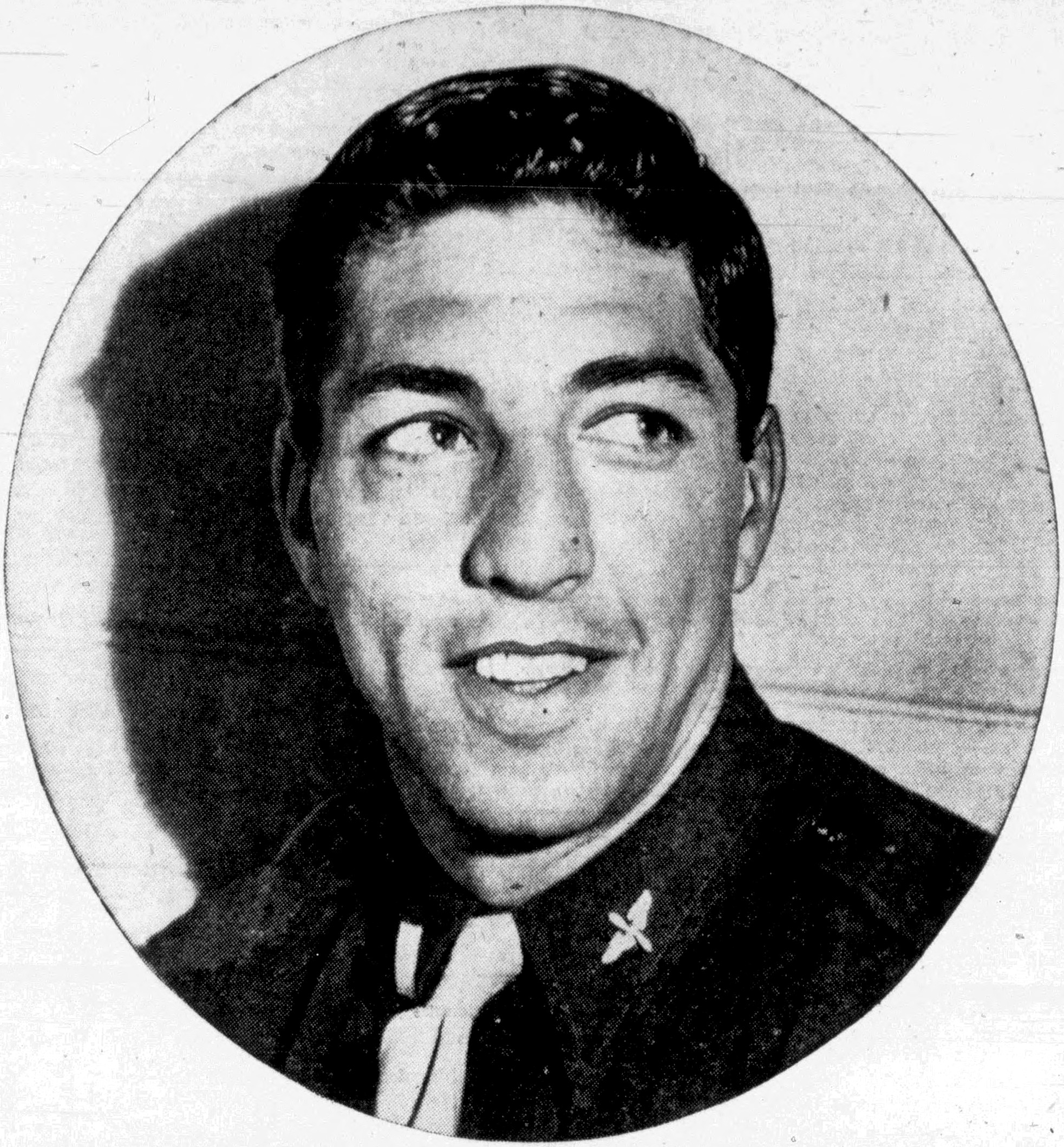
- Sparlis, circa 1945

No. 21, 58
- Position: Guard

Personal information
- Born: May 20, 1920; Los Angeles, California, U.S.
- Died: July 9, 2005 (aged 85); Porterville, California, U.S.
- Listed height: 5 ft 11 in (1.80 m)
- Listed weight: 185 lb (84 kg)

Career information
- High school: Los Angeles Poly
- College: UCLA (1941–1942, 1945)
- NFL draft: 1946: 30th round, 286th overall pick

Career history
- Green Bay Packers (1946)

Awards and highlights
- First-team All-American (1945); First-team All-PCC (1945)

Career NFL statistics
- Games played: 3
- Games started: 1
- Stats at Pro Football Reference
- College Football Hall of Fame

Albert Alexander Sparlis (May 20, 1920 – July 9, 2005) was an American football player. He played college football for the UCLA Bruins and professional football for the Green Bay Packers of the National Football League (NFL). Sparlis was a highly decorated military pilot, serving during World War II, the Korean War, and the Vietnam War. He was inducted into the College Football Hall of Fame in 1983.

== Biography ==
Sparlis was born in Los Angeles in 1920. One of three brothers, his parents divorced when he was four. Each parent took one of his brothers, and Sparlis ended up in an orphanage at age eight; by age 10, he was sent to a reformatory. Several years later, he briefly lived with his mother in Phoenix, then returned to Los Angeles where he attended Polytechnic High School. He played high school football and graduated with the highest grade average in his class.

Sparlis attended the University of California, Los Angeles (UCLA) where he was a member of Sigma Nu fraternity and played for the UCLA Bruins football program. He played for the 1941 team that finished with a 5–5–1 record, and the 1942 team that had a 7–3 regular season record before losing to Georgia in the Rose Bowl. His college career was interrupted by World War II military service, where he flew B-25s in Southeast Asia. Returning to UCLA, Sparlis played for the 1945 team that finished with a 5–4 record. He was named to the 1945 All-Pacific Coast football team and the 1945 College Football All-America Team by some selectors.

Sparlis was selected by the Green Bay Packers of the National Football League (NFL) in the 30th round of the 1946 NFL draft. He appeared in three games for the Packers in 1946. He then took a sales position with the General Cigar Company.

Sparlis later returned to military service with the United States Air Force during the Korean War and the Vietnam War. His military citations include the Distinguished Flying Cross (with four oak leaf clusters) and Air Medal (with nine oak clear clusters). He retired with the rank of colonel. Outside of the military, Sparlis worked for Coldwell Banker for 35 years, and was a trustee of Claremont Men's College in Claremont, California.

Sparlis was inducted to the College Football Hall of Fame in 1983, and the UCLA Athletics Hall of Fame in 1984. He died in July 2005 in Porterville, California, aged 85. He was survived by a daughter.
