= Roy Campanella II =

American film director

- Born: Roy Campanella II; June 20, 1948 (age 78); St. Paul, Minnesota, U.S.
- Occupations: Television director and television producer
- Years active: 1982–present
- Father: Roy Campanella

Roy Campanella II (born June 20, 1948) is a television director and producer.

== Biography ==
Born Roy Campanella II, he is the son of professional baseball great Roy Campanella. After directing some short films, the younger Campanella began directing episodic television. One of his first professional assignments was directing an episode of the Lou Grant television series in 1982. Within a few years he was also directing longer form television projects. He was also listed as a "creative consultant" in the credits of the sitcom 227.

By the late 1990s, he was also producing. He entered into an arrangement with Black Entertainment Television (BET) to executive produce a series of feature-length adaptations of black romance novels (three of which he also directed).

In 2004, Campanella was named general manager of Pacifica radio station KPFA in Berkeley, California. Campanella resigned 14 months later in the wake of reports that KPFA's 24-member Local Station Board (LSB) voted to terminate his employment. Tomas Moran, a former board member and KPFA supporter, speculated that Campanella was forced to resign because he rankled a fiercely entrenched bureaucracy that could not agree on the direction of the station. The previous general manager, Gus Newport, a former mayor of Berkeley, served less than a year before he stepped down, citing personal reasons.

== Selected credits ==
=== Directing ===
==== Movies of the Week (MOWs) ====
Year	Title	Network	Notes
2000	Masquerade	BET	
2000	Playing with Fire	BET	
1999	Rendezvous	BET	
1991	Brother Future	PBS	DGA Award, Outstanding Directorial Achievement in Dramatic Shows - Daytime
1988	Quiet Victory: The Charlie Wedemeyer Story	CBS	
1988	Body of Evidence	CBS	
1986	Passion and Memory	PBS	

==== Episodic ====
Year	Series	Network	Episode	Notes
2002	Philly	ABC	"Lies of Minelli"	
2002	Boston Public	Fox	"Chapter Thirty-Four"	
1999–2000	Beverly Hills, 90210	Fox	"Slipping Away"	
1999–2000	Beverly Hills, 90210	Fox	"Trials and Tribulations"	
1999–2000	Beverly Hills, 90210	Fox	"I'm Happy for You...Really"	
1997	Dr. Quinn, Medicine Woman	CBS	"Wave Goodbye"	
1992	I'll Fly Away	NBC	"The Way Things Are"	nominated for DGA Award, Outstanding Directorial Achievement in Dramatic Series' - Night
1986	Dallas	CBS	"Shadow Games"	
1986	Knots Landing	CBS	"Unbroken Bonds"	
1982	Lou Grant	CBS	"Beachhead"	

== Awards and recognition ==
- 1992: DGA Award nomination
- 1991: DGA Award
