= List of Early Edition characters =

This is a list of characters in the American television series Early Edition which ran from September 28, 1996 to May 27, 2000. The characters are listed alphabetically by their last name or by the name which appears in the episode credits.

== Main characters ==
The characters listed in this section are those whose portrayer has appeared in the opening credits. They are listed according to the order in the opening credits.

Name	Description	Portrayer	Seasons
Gary Hobson	Hobson, who grew up in the state of Indiana, lived and worked in Chicago as a stockbroker until his wife Marsha left him. After this dramatic event, Gary began receiving The Paper, and subsequently left his job. As he kept encountering more and more opportunities to help people and prevent tragedies using The Paper, he proved himself to be a person of high integrity and upstanding morals. Gary had difficulty finding another love interest, and at the conclusion of the series still remained single.	Kyle Chandler	1–4
Marissa Clark	Blind since the age of 16 months after contracting meningitis, she was formerly a receptionist at the stock brokerage firm Hobson formerly worked at. She too left the brokerage firm, ultimately helping Gary Hobson manage McGinty's Bar later in the series. During the first season, Gary uses horse-track winnings to help her purchase a guide dog named Spike, who remained with her until the show's end. Similar to Gary, Marissa was never married during the series.	Shanésia Davis-Williams	1–4
Chuck Fishman	Fishman, a friend of Gary's, is a former fellow stockbroker. He would like to make profit out of The Paper, besides helping people.	Fisher Stevens	1–2 (Starring), 3–4 (Guest Starring)
Erica Paget	Paget works at McGinty's. She is the mother of Henry Paget and is divorced from her husband, Michael. She briefly dated Gary.	Kristy Swanson	3
Henry Paget	Son of Erica Paget, who loves to hang around Gary	Myles Jeffrey	3
Patrick Quinn	Bartender at McGinty's	Billie Worley	3–4

== Recurring characters ==
Recurring characters that appeared on Early Edition.

Name	Description	Portrayer	Seasons
Paul Armstrong	Police detective that has a few run-ins with Gary and is constantly trying to figure out what he is hiding	Michael Whaley	3–4
Toni Brigatti	Police detective that has a few run-ins with Gary; a confirmed love interest in season four	Constance Marie	3–4
Marion Zeke Crumb	Police detective that believes Gary is strange, but a good guy	Ron Dean	1–4
Miguel Diaz	Photographer who wants to find out the truth about how Gary knows things	Luis Antonio Ramos	4
Bernie Hobson	Gary's father	William Devane	1–4
Lois Hobson	Gary's mother	Tess Harper	2–4
