= Bill Gray (offensive lineman) =

American football player (1922–2011)

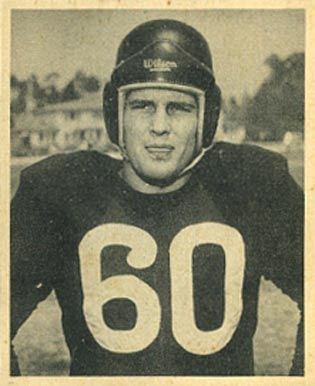
- 1948 Bowman card

No. 60
- Positions: Guard, center, back

Personal information
- Born: December 27, 1922; Portland, Oregon, U.S.
- Died: August 18, 2011 (aged 88); Portland, Oregon, U.S.
- Listed height: 5 ft 11 in (1.80 m)
- Listed weight: 210 lb (95 kg)

Career information
- High school: Benson Polytechnic (Portland)
- College: USC; Oregon State
- NFL draft: 1947: 7th round, 48th overall pick

Career history
- Washington Redskins (1947–1948)

Awards and highlights
- Second-team All-American (1943); First-team All-PCC (1943); Second-team All-PCC (1946)

Career NFL statistics
- Games played: 24
- Games started: 4
- Fumble recoveries: 4
- Stats at Pro Football Reference

William Robertson Gray Jr. (December 27, 1922 – August 18, 2011) was an American professional football offensive lineman in the National Football League (NFL) for the Washington Redskins. He played college football at the University of Southern California and Oregon State University and was drafted 48th overall in the seventh round of the 1947 NFL draft.
