= 1947 All-Pacific Coast football team =

American all-star college football team

The 1947 All-Pacific Coast football team consists of American football players chosen by various organizations for All-Pacific Coast teams for the 1947 college football season. The organizations selecting these teams included the conference coaches, the Associated Press (AP), and the United Press (UP).

The 1947 USC Trojans football team won the PCC championship in 1947, finished the season ranked #8 in the final AP Poll, and had four players receive first-team honors. End Paul Cleary, tackle John Ferraro, and halfback Don Doll received first-team honors from the coaches, AP and UP, and Cleary and Ferraro were later inducted into the College Football Hall of Fame. Tackle Bob Hendren was selected as a first-team honoree by the AP.

The California Golden Bears football team finished in second place in the PCC with a 9–1 record and were ranked #15 in the final AP Poll. The Golden Bears landed two players on one or more of the All-PCC first teams. Guard Rod Franz and fullback John Graves were chosen as a first-team honorees by the coaches, the AP, and the UP, and Franz was later inducted into the College Football Hall of Fame.

The Oregon Ducks finished in third place in the PCC and landed three players on one or more of the first team squads. Quarterback Norm Van Brocklin was a consensus first-team pick by the coaches, the AP, and the UP, and was later inducted into both the College and Pro Football Halls of Fame. Halfback Jake Leicht received first-team honors from the coaches and the UP, and center Brad Ecklund was selected by the coaches as a first-team player.

Despite finishing in fourth place with a 5-4 record, the UCLA Bruins had more first-team selections, five, than any other team in the conference. The UCLA first-team honorees were end Tom Fears (coaches, AP, UP), center Don Paul (AP, UP), tackle Bill Chambers (coaches, UP), guard Mike Dimitro (coaches, AP), and halfback Al Holsch (AP). Fears was later inducted into both the College and Pro Football Halls of Fame.

== All-Pacific Coast selections ==
=== Quarterback ===
- Norm Van Brocklin, Oregon (Coaches-1; AP-1; UP-1) (College and Pro Football Halls of Fame)
- George Murphy, USC (Coaches-2; AP-2)

=== Halfbacks ===
- Don Doll, USC (Coaches-1; AP-1; UP-1)
- Jake Leicht, Oregon (Coaches-1; AP-2; UP-1)
- Al Hoisch, UCLA (AP-1)
- Cal Rossi, UCLA (Coaches-2; AP-2)
- Bill Williams, Idaho (Coaches-2; AP-3)
- Herman Wedemeyer, St. Mary's (AP-2)
- George Quist, Stanford (AP-3)
- Dick Ottele, Washington (AP-3)

=== Fullback ===
- John Graves, California (Coaches-1; AP-1; UP-1)
- Jerry Shipkey, UCLA (Coaches-2; AP-3)

=== Ends ===
- Paul Cleary, USC (Coaches-1; AP-1; UP-1) (College Football Hall of Fame)
- Tom Fears, UCLA (Coaches-1; AP-1; UP-1) (College and Pro Football Halls of Fame)
- Don Garza, Oregon (Coaches-2; AP-2)
- Bud Van Deren, California (Coaches-2)
- Dick Hagen, Washington (AP-2)
- Jack Cunningham, California (AP-3)
- Harry Agler, California (AP-3)

=== Tackles ===
- John Ferraro, USC (Coaches-1; AP-1; UP-1) (College Football Hall of Fame)
- Bill Chambers, UCLA (Coaches-1; AP-2; UP-1)
- Bob Hendren, USC (Coaches-2; AP-1)
- Don Stanton, Oregon (Coaches-2)
- Ron Sockolov, California (AP-2)
- Atherton Phleger, Stanford (AP-3)
- Jim Turner, California (AP-3)

=== Guards ===
- Rod Franz, California (Coaches-1; AP-1; UP-1) (College Football Hall of Fame)
- Bob Levenhagen, Washington (AP-2; UP-1)
- Mike Dimitro, UCLA (Coaches-1; AP-1)
- Paul Evenson, Oregon St. (Coaches-2; AP-2)
- Don Clark, USC (Coaches-2; AP-3)
- Jon Baker, California (AP-3)

=== Centers ===
- Don Paul, UCLA (Coaches-2; AP-1; UP-1)
- Brad Ecklund, Oregon (Coaches-1; AP-3)
- Walt McCormick, USC (AP-2)

== Key ==
Coaches = selected by the conference coaches and announced by Pacific Coast Conference Commissioner Vic Schmidt

AP = Associated Press, based on "consensus of coaches and experts"

UP = United Press, based on votes of "sports writers up and down the coast"

Bold = Consensus first-team selection of the coaches, AP and UP

== See also ==
- 1947 College Football All-America Team
