= Harry Marker (American football) =

American football player (1910–1989)

No. 13
- Position: Fullback / Defensive back

Personal information
- Born: September 17, 1910; Ligonier, Pennsylvania, U.S.
- Died: April 19, 1989 (aged 78); Patrick AFB, Florida, U.S.
- Listed height: 5 ft 6 in (1.68 m)
- Listed weight: 155 lb (70 kg)

Career information
- College: West Virginia

Career history
- Pittsburgh Pirates (1934)
- Stats at Pro Football Reference

Harry Marker
- Military career
- Allegiance: United States
- Branch: United States Army
- Service years: 1935–c.1965
- Conflicts: World War II; Korean War; Vietnam War

Harold Joseph Marker (September 17, 1910 – April 19, 1989) was an American football player at West Virginia University and later with the Pittsburgh Pirates. He played in the National Football League (NFL) for the Pirates in just one game in 1934, before deciding on a military career in the United States Army. He, along with Ralph Heywood, have the distinction of being the only players to serve as members of the United States Armed Forces during World War II, the Korean and Vietnam Wars.
