= Bill Chambers (gridiron football) =

American football player (1923–1983)

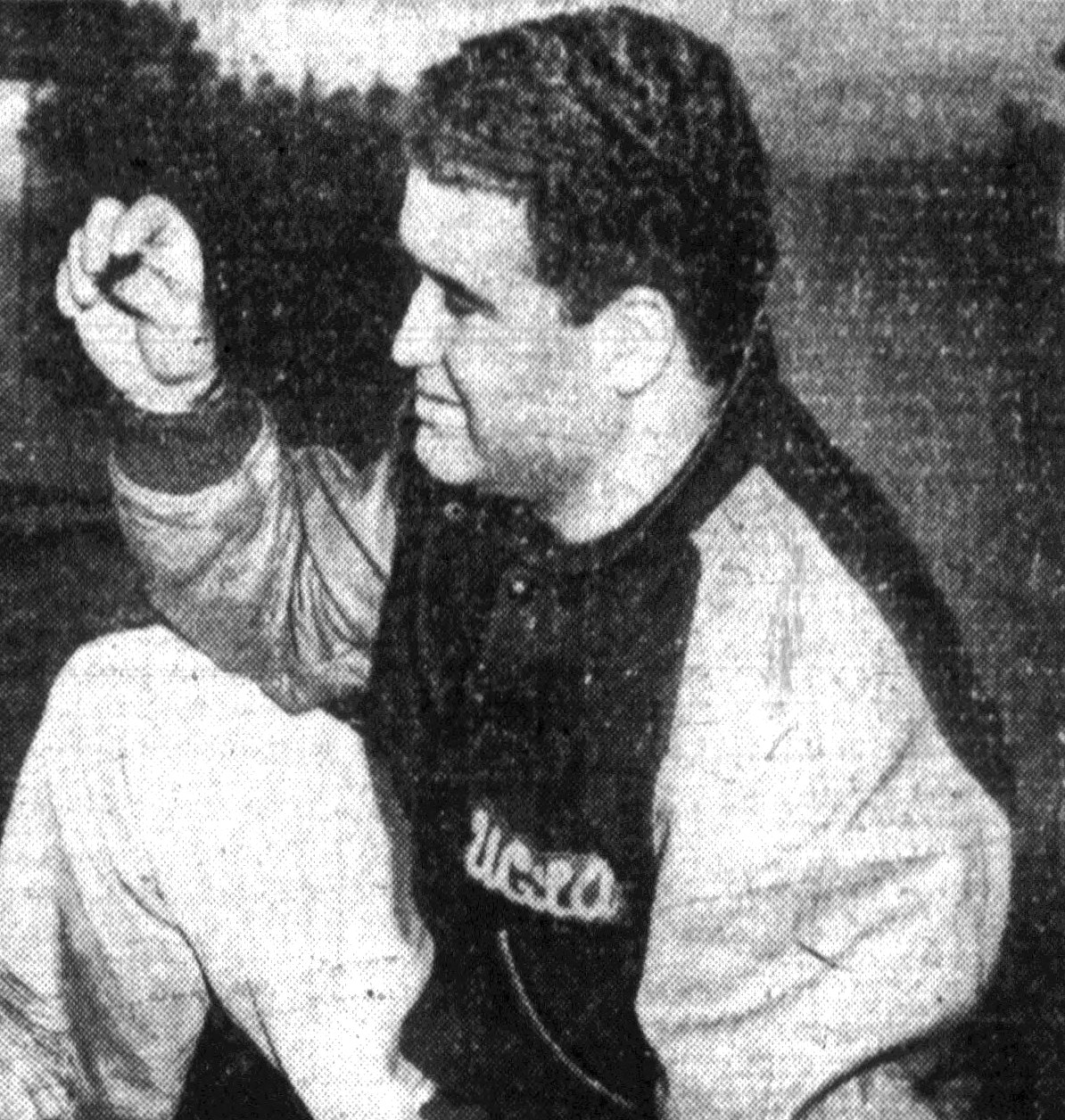
- Chambers, circa 1946

No. 43, 45, 77, 50
- Position: Guard

Personal information
- Born: October 17, 1923; Los Angeles, California, U.S.
- Died: September 29, 1983 (aged 59); Santa Barbara, California, U.S.
- Listed height: 6 ft 2 in (1.88 m)
- Listed weight: 230 lb (104 kg)

Career information
- High school: Loyola (Los Angeles)
- College: Georgia Tech (1943–1944); Alabama (1945); UCLA (1946–1947)
- NFL draft: 1945: 13th round, 129th overall pick

Career history
- New York Yankees (1948–1949); Montreal Alouettes (1951); Ottawa Rough Riders (1952)

Awards and highlights
- First-team All-PCC (1947); Second-team All-PCC (1946)

Career AAFC statistics
- Games played: 25
- Games started: 2
- Stats at Pro Football Reference

William Joseph Chambers (October 17, 1923 – September 29, 1983) was an American professional football lineman in the All-America Football Conference (AAFC). He played two seasons for the New York Yankees (1948–1949). He played collegiately for Alabama, Georgia Tech and UCLA.
