= Charlie Wedemeyer =

American teacher and football coach (1946–2010)

Charlie Wedemeyer (February 19, 1946 – June 3, 2010) was a high school teacher and football coach. He played college football at Michigan State University. After being diagnosed with Lou Gehrig's disease, he continued to teach and coach football at Los Gatos High School in Los Gatos, California. He was the subject of a PBS documentary and a made-for-TV movie. Charlie's brother Herman also played college football as an All-American halfback for St. Mary's College in Moraga, California and finished fourth in the 1945 Heisman Trophy voting.

== Biography ==
Wedemeyer was the last of nine children born to Bill and Ruth Wedemeyer. He was born in Honolulu, Hawaii. He was a high school athlete and was quarterback of the Punahou School football team. He was named Hawaii Prep Athlete of the 1960s. After his graduation from Punahou in 1965 he attended Michigan State University where he played for coach Duffy Daugherty. Charlie graduated from Michigan State in 1969 and obtained a master's degree from Central Michigan University.

In 1978, while he was the head football coach at Los Gatos High School, he was diagnosed with amyotrophic lateral sclerosis. At his death, he could only move his eyes, eyebrows and lips.

The PBS documentary about the Wedemeyers, One More Season, won an Emmy Award. Michael Nouri portrayed Wedemeyer in the 1988 made-for-TV movie Quiet Victory: The Charlie Wedemeyer Story filmed at Stratford High School in Goose Creek, South Carolina. Charlie and Lucy Wedemeyer co-wrote, with Gregg Lewis, his autobiography, Charlie's Victory.

== Death ==
Wedemeyer died on June 3, 2010, from pneumonia, a complication caused by a recent surgery. His elder brother was actor Herman Wedemeyer.
