= Walt McCormick =

American football player (1926–2005)

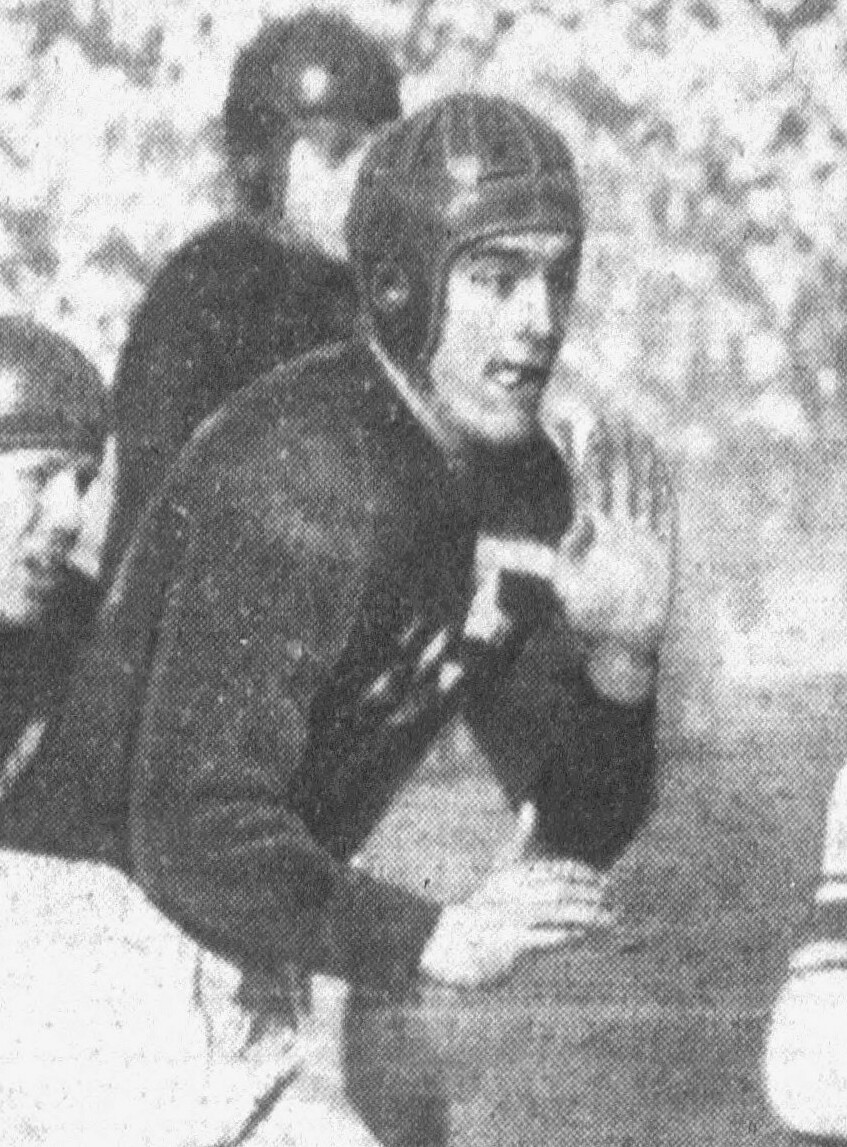
- Walt McCormick, 1947

No. 24, 38
- Positions: Center, linebacker

Personal information
- Born: September 4, 1926; Visalia, California, U.S.
- Died: April 3, 2005 (aged 78); Visalia, California, U.S.
- Listed height: 6 ft 1 in (1.85 m)
- Listed weight: 215 lb (98 kg)

Career information
- High school: Visalia
- College: Washington (1944); USC (1945–1947)
- NFL draft: 1948: 24th round, 216th overall pick

Career history
- San Francisco 49ers (1948)

Awards and highlights
- 2× Second-team All-PCC (1945, 1947)

Career AAFC statistics
- Games played: 9
- Stats at Pro Football Reference

Walter Kendall McCormick (September 4, 1926 – April 3, 2005) was an American professional football player who played at the center and linebacker positions. He played college football for Washington and USC and professional football for the San Francisco 49ers.

== Early life ==
McCormick was born in 1926 in Visalia, California. He attended Visalia Union High School, graduating in 1944. He also threw the shot put for the track team.

== Military and college football ==
After graduating from high school, McCormick served in the United States Navy during World War II and played college football as a tackle for the Washington Huskies in 1944. He attended the University of Washington as part of the V-12 Navy College Training Program. After the war, he enrolled at the University of Southern California and played for the USC Trojans football as a center and linebacker team from 1945 to 1947. As a senior, he helped lead the 1947 USC Trojans football team to a Pacific Coast Conference championship. After facing Michigan in the 1948 Rose Bowl, Michigan's head coach Fritz Crisler described McCormick as "the best center his team had faced all season."

== Professional football ==
McCormick was selected by the New York Giants in the 24th round (216th pick) of the 1948 NFL draft and by the San Francisco 49ers in the fourth round (23rd overall pick) of the 1948 AAFC Draft. He signed with the 49ers in February 1948. He played for the 49ers during their 1948 season, appearing in nine of their 14 games.

== Family and later years ==
After his football career ended, McCormick attended Loyola Law School, graduating in 1952. He practiced law in Visalia. He was married to Susan Herdti in 1949. McCormick died in 2005 at age 78 in Visalia.
