= Quiet Victory: The Charlie Wedemeyer Story =

- Screenplay by: Barry Morrow
- Directed by: Roy Campanella II
- Starring: Pam Dawber; Michael Nouri
- Theme music composer: Don Davis
- Country of origin: United States
- Original language: English

Production
- Producer: Linda Otto
- Cinematography: Stan Gilbert
- Editor: Robin Wilson
- Running time: 100 minutes
- Production companies: The Landsburg Company; Campbell Soup Company; BBD&O, Inc. CBS Television City

Original release
- Network: CBS
- Release: December 26, 1988

Quiet Victory: The Charlie Wedemeyer Story is a 1988 American television film directed by Roy Campanella II and starring Michael Nouri as Charlie Wedemeyer and Pam Dawber as his wife Lucy.

== Cast ==
- Pam Dawber as Lucy Wedemeyer (except last scene fadeover from Dawber to actual Lucy)
- Michael Nouri as Charlie Wedemeyer (except last scene fadeover from Nouri to actual Charlie)
- Peter Berg as Bobby Maker
- James Handy as Charlie's Doctor
- Reginald VelJohnson as Assistant Coach
- Noble Willingham as Ted Simonsen
- Stephen Dorff as Older Kale Wedemeyer
- Kyle Chandler as Skinner
