= Fred Boensch =

American football player (1920–2000)

No. 51
- Positions: Guard, linebacker

Personal information
- Born: September 27, 1920; Portland, Oregon, U.S.
- Died: April 20, 2000 (aged 79); Redwood City, California, U.S.
- Listed height: 6 ft 4 in (1.93 m)
- Listed weight: 228 lb (103 kg)

Career information
- High school: San Mateo (San Mateo, California)
- College: California; Stanford
- NFL draft: 1944: 9th round, 86th overall pick

Career history
- Washington Redskins (1947–1948)

Awards and highlights
- Second-team All-PCC (1943)

Career NFL statistics
- Games played: 24
- Games started: 19
- Interceptions: 1
- Stats at Pro Football Reference

Frederick Maxmilian Boensch (September 27, 1920 – April 20, 2000) was an American professional football guard in the National Football League (NFL) for the Washington Redskins. He played college football at the University of California, Berkeley and Stanford University and was drafted in the ninth round of the 1944 NFL draft by the Cleveland Rams.

== Early life, war, and football ==
Boensch was born in Portland, Oregon and raised in San Mateo, California, the son of Max Boensch and Frieda Oetken Boensch. His father was born in Germany and worked at a newspaper.

Boensch played football and was elected student body president at San Mateo High School. He played college football at San Mateo Junior College, the University of California, Berkeley and Stanford University. He was "one of a handful of men who played for both Stanford and California", longstanding football rivals. He was drafted into the NFL in 1944, and was a member of the Washington Redskins from 1947 to 1949.

In 1945, Boensch survived a bullet wound in the neck and jaw while serving with the United States Marines at Okinawa. To protect his facial bones during football after the war, he wore a special hard rubber, iron, and leather face masks, including a mask first developed for Bones Hamilton in the 1920s. He was known as "San Mateo's Indestructible Football Player", and photographs of his mask were published in newspapers.

== Later years ==
After his sports career, Boensch worked in the printing industry. He was elected to the Stanford University Hall of Fame. Boensch married Olga Louise Blazevich; they had four daughters. His wife died in 1990, and he died in 2000, at the age of 79, in Redwood City, California.
