= Don Paul (linebacker) =

American football player and coach (1925–2014)

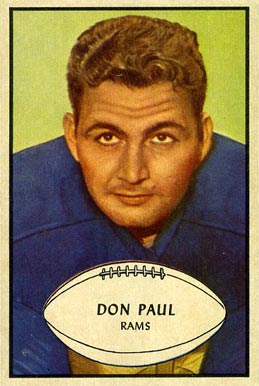
- Paul on a 1953 Bowman football card

No. 57
- Positions: Linebacker, guard, center

Personal information
- Born: March 18, 1925; Fresno, California, U.S.
- Died: November 8, 2014 (aged 89); Los Angeles, California, U.S.
- Listed height: 6 ft 1 in (1.85 m)
- Listed weight: 228 lb (103 kg)

Career information
- High school: Los Angeles
- College: UCLA (1943-1944, 1946-1947)
- NFL draft: 1947: 3rd round, 21st overall pick

Career history

Playing
- Los Angeles Rams (1948–1955)

Coaching
- Los Angeles Rams (1959–1961) Defensive line coach

Awards and highlights
- NFL champion (1951); 3× Pro Bowl (1951, 1952, 1953); 2× First-team All-PCC (1946, 1947)

Career NFL statistics
- Games played: 87
- Games started: 63
- Interceptions: 11
- Fumble recoveries: 6
- Stats at Pro Football Reference

Don Paul (March 18, 1925 – November 8, 2014) was an American professional football player who was a linebacker for the Los Angeles Rams of the National Football League (NFL) from 1948 to 1955. He played college football for the UCLA Bruins. He was selected to three Pro Bowls during his years with the Rams.

Paul was inducted into the UCLA Athletics Hall of Fame in 1986. He was one of only two players to play in six UCLA-USC games during the World War II years.

Paul was assistant coach for the Rams when Bob Waterfield was the head coach. The staff included Hamp Pool and Jim David.

After Paul's football career he joined up with Roy Harlow and established the Rams Horn restaurant. Later he and Harlow teamed up with former Rams quarterback Bob Waterfield and Rams radio play-by-play broadcaster Bob Kelley opened up the Pump Room restaurant. He died after an illness on November 8, 2014.
