= Jim Watson (American football) =

American football player (1921–2004)

No. 37
- Positions: Center, linebacker

Personal information
- Born: March 26, 1921; Stockton, California, U.S.
- Died: May 11, 2004 (aged 83); Marysville, California, U.S.
- Listed height: 6 ft 0 in (1.83 m)
- Listed weight: 205 lb (93 kg)

Career information
- High school: Marysville
- College: Pacific (1942–1944)
- NFL draft: 1945: undrafted

Career history
- Washington Redskins (1945)
- Stats at Pro Football Reference

James Robert Watson (March 26, 1921 – May 11, 2004) was an American professional football player for the Washington Redskins of the National Football League (NFL). He played college football for the Pacific Tigers.

== Early life ==
James Robert Watson was born on March 26, 1921, in Stockton, California. He attended Marysville High School.

== College career ==
Watson played junior college football at Yuba College in 1941. He transferred to the College of the Pacific, where he was a three-year varsity letterman from 1942 to 1944. He earned Associated Press second-team All-Pacific Coast honors in 1943.

== Professional career ==
Watson went undrafted in the 1945 NFL draft. In July 1945, it was reported that he had signed with the Washington Redskins. He played in four games, starting one, for the Redskins as a center/linebacker. He was released in early November 1945.

== Personal life ==
Watson served in the United States Marine Corps. He died on May 11, 2004, in Marysville, California.
