= Burr Baldwin =

American football player (1922–2007)

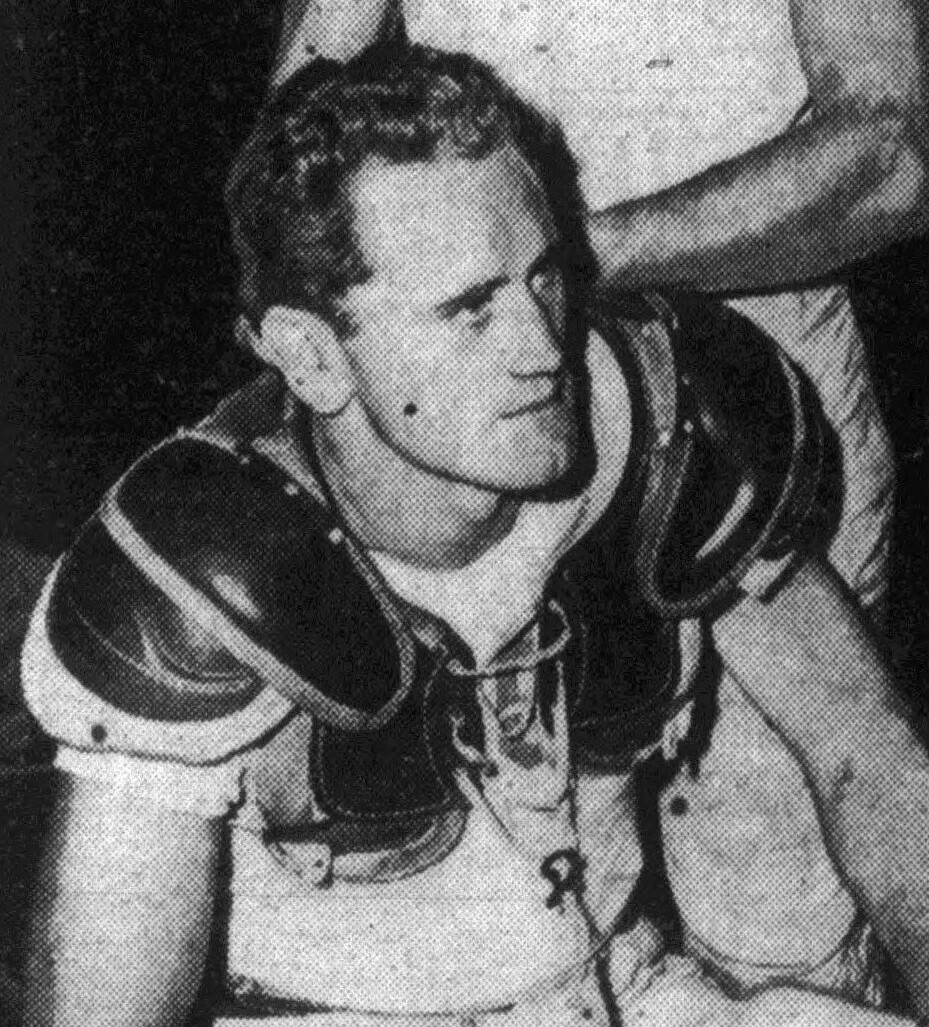
- Baldwin, c. 1946

No. 52
- Position: End

Personal information
- Born: June 13, 1922; Bakersfield, California, U.S.
- Died: August 20, 2007 (aged 85); Bakersfield, California, U.S.
- Listed height: 6 ft 1 in (1.85 m)
- Listed weight: 197 lb (89 kg)

Career information
- High school: Bakersfield
- College: UCLA (1940-1942, 1946)
- NFL draft: 1947: 3rd round, 20th overall pick

Career history
- Los Angeles Dons (1947-1949)

Awards and highlights
- Unanimous All-American (1946); First-team All-PCC (1946); UCLA Bruins No. 38 retired

Career AAFC statistics
- Receptions: 24
- Receiving yards: 397
- Receiving touchdowns: 1
- Stats at Pro Football Reference

Burr Browning Baldwin (June 13, 1922 – August 20, 2007) was an American professional football player. He played college football for the UCLA Bruins, and became the school's first player to receive All-American honors. Baldwin played pro football for three years with the Los Angeles Dons of the All-America Football Conference (AAFC).

== Biography ==
Baldwin attended Bakersfield High School in Bakersfield, California. He attended college at the University of California, Los Angeles, where he played for the Bruins as an end from 1940 to 1942. In 1943, he put his education and playing career on hiatus to enter the U.S. Army during World War II. He served from May 1943 to July 1946 and became an infantry captain in three campaigns in the European theater of operations.

After the war, he returned to UCLA, and in 1946, became the first UCLA football player to earn All-America honors. He played in two Rose Bowls for UCLA and in 1947 was drafted by the Green Bay Packers.

After college, Baldwin played professional football with the Los Angeles Dons from 1947 to 1949. He returned to military service during the Korean War from 1951 to 1953. Baldwin spent fifty years working as an insurance broker before he retired in July 2007. He died at his home in Bakersfield on August 20, 2007, of complications due to cancer. The Bob Elias Kern County Sports Hall of Fame inducted Baldwin in February 1969.
