= Earl Klapstein =

American football player and coach (1922–1997)

No. 40
- Position: Tackle

Personal information
- Born: March 8, 1922; Lodi, California, U.S.
- Died: April 28, 1997 (aged 75); Lodi, California, U.S.
- Listed height: 6 ft 0 in (1.83 m)
- Listed weight: 220 lb (100 kg)

Career information
- High school: Lodi
- College: Pacific (CA) (1941-1942)
- NFL draft: 1944: 24th round, 250th overall pick

Career history

Playing
- San Diego NTS (1944–1945); Pittsburgh Steelers (1946)

Coaching
- Manteca HS (CA) (1947–1948) Head coach; Stockton (1949) Line coach; Stockton (1950–1953) Head coach; Idaho (1954–1955) Line coach; Green Bay Packers (1956) Defensive line coach; Cerritos (1957–1958) Head coach

Awards and highlights
- First-team All-PCC (1943)

Career NFL statistics
- Games played: 9
- Stats at Pro Football Reference

Head coaching record
- Career: 41–15–2 (.724)

Earl L. Klapstein (March 8, 1922 – April 28, 1997) was an American professional football player and coach. He played professionally as a tackle for the Pittsburgh Steelers of the National Football League (NFL) in 1946. Klapstein played college football at the College of the Pacific—now known as University of the Pacific in Stockton, California. He was selected 250th overall by the Philadelphia Eagles in the 24th round of the 1944 NFL draft. Klapstein served as the head football coach at Stockton College—now known as San Joaquin Delta College—from 1950 to 1953 and Cerritos College in Norwalk, California from 1957 to 1958.

Klapstein was hired in 1947 at Manteca High School in Manteca, California to coach football, basketball, and track.

== Head coaching record ==
=== Junior college football ===
| Year | Team | Overall | Conference | Standing | Bowl/playoffs |
|---|---|---|---|---|---|
Stockton Mustangs (Northern California Junior College Conference) (1950)
| 1950 | Stockton | 8–2 | 4–2 | 2nd (Southern) | |
Stockton Mustangs (Big Seven Conference) (1951–1953)
| 1951 | Stockton | 5–3–2 | 3–1–2 | 2nd | |
| 1952 | Stockton | 7–2 | 6–0 | 1st | |
| 1953 | Stockton | 5–5 | 3–3 | 4th | |
| Stockton: | | 25–12–2 | 16–6–2 | | |
Cerritos Falcons (Western State Conference) (1957–1958)
| 1957 | Cerritos | 8–2 | 5–1 | 2nd | |
| 1958 | Cerritos | 8–1 | 6–0 | 1st | |
| Cerritos: | | 16–3 | 11–1 | | |
| Total: | | 41–15–2 | | | |
National championship Conference title Conference division title or championship game berth
