= Art McCaffray =

American football player (1921–)

No. 48
- Position: Tackle

Personal information
- Born: December 26, 1921; Seattle, Washington, U.S.
- Died: December 5, 1994 (aged 72); Seattle, Washington, U.S.
- Listed height: 5 ft 11 in (1.80 m)
- Listed weight: 190 lb (86 kg)

Career information
- High school: Seattle Preparatory
- College: Pacific
- NFL draft: 1944: 4th round, 31st overall pick

Career history
- Pittsburgh Steelers (1946)

Awards and highlights
- Second-team All-American (1943)
- Stats at Pro Football Reference

Arthur Joseph McCaffray (December 26, 1921 – December 5, 1994) was an American professional football tackle who played for the Pittsburgh Steelers of the National Football League (NFL). He played college football for the Santa Clara Broncos and Pacific Tigers. He was selected by the Steelers with the 31st overall pick of the 1946 NFL draft.

== Early life ==
Arthur Joseph McCaffray was born on December 26, 1921, in Seattle, Washington. He attended Seattle Preparatory School.

== College career ==
McCaffray first played college football for the Broncos of the University of Santa Clara. He was on the team's roster from 1941 to 1942. He transferred to the College of the Pacific, where he was a varsity letterman for the Tigers in 1943. For the 1943 season, McCaffray was named a second-team All-American by United Press (UP), and a first-team All-American by both Collier's Weekly and the New York Sun. He also earned first-team All-Pacific Coast honors from both the UP and Associated Press. He was inducted into Santa Clara University's athletics hall of fame in 1999.

== Professional career ==
McCaffray was selected by the Pittsburgh Steelers in the fourth round, with the 31st overall pick, of the 1946 NFL draft. He served in the United States Marine Corps. He played in all 11 games, starting ten, at tackle for the Steelers in 1946 as the team went 5–5–1. He recovered one fumble. McCaffray did not report to the team for training camp in 1947, instead opting to keep working in the canning business with his brothers.

== Personal life ==
McCaffray died on December 5, 1994, in Seattle.
