= Nicholas Everett Hollis =

Nicholas E. Hollis
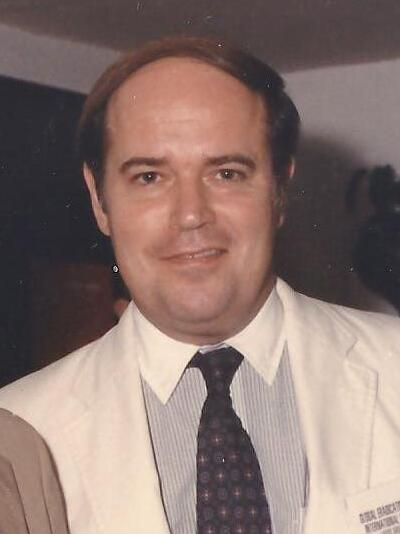
- Hollis in 1989
- Born: Nicholas Everett Hollis; May 11, 1943 (age 83); Randolph, Vermont, U.S.

Nicholas Everett Hollis (born May 11, 1944) became a leading trade expansionist over the last three decades of the twentieth century sponsoring dozens of high-level trade/investment missions and international conferences utilizing influential business and government positions in organizations, including the U.S. Chamber of Commerce, National Association of Manufacturers (NAM), Industry Center for Trade Negotiations (ICTN), U.S. Department of State/Agency for International Development (USAID), Agri-Energy Roundtable (AER), and most recently as president of The Agribusiness Council (ABC), a nonprofit organization founded by Henry Heinz II in 1967.

== Early life ==
The eldest son of Everett L. Hollis, a prominent Chicago attorney, and Marion Armstrong Jennings, a fiction writer, Hollis grew up outside Washington, D.C., and New York City, attended public schools and received a Bachelor of Arts degree in history (with honors) from DePauw University (1966) and a master's degree in international affairs from Johns Hopkins School of Advanced International Studies (1968). He also studied international law at the City of London College at Moorgate (1965) and the Bologna Center in Italy (1967).

== Career ==
=== 1970s ===
After a year of teaching in Washington’s public schools, Hollis joined the International Group of the U.S. Chamber of Commerce. In a program largely devoted to bilateral councils, as a junior staffer Hollis was assigned to the export expansion and finance desk.

He also researched and authored position papers on trade policy subjects for the Chamber’s International Committee. He soon conceived a bold project aimed at strengthening U.S. export financing programs, organized a special task force of leading bankers and industrialists and recruited a top Caterpillar Tractor Company executive (V.V. Grant) to chair the campaign. Eighteen months later – with multiple meetings, two national surveys and a publication he authored, Hollis led the Task Force on Export Finance and Credit to testify before Congress and drafted language which formed the core of a successful legislative initiative called the Export Expansion Finance Act of 1971 (H.R. 8181) sponsored by Thomas “Lud” Ashley (D-OH), which broadened the programming flexibility and competitiveness of the Export Import Bank, spearheading a national drive to expand exports.
Hollis went on to staff the highly successful U.S.-European Businessmen’s Conference held in March 1972 (Paris) which brought him into direct interaction with some of the world’s top industrialists and formed an ongoing US-EC Business Council.

Recruited by rival NAM to organize that association’s international economic affairs department in 1972, Hollis continued his successful innovation with association management by conceiving and implementing the first industry-wide campaign to quantify non-tariff trade barriers (NTB). Working with a coalition of thirty industrial groups representing a broad array of US manufacturing, his surveys, speeches and publications on NTBs led to the formation of a unique industry-sponsored monitoring program for the multilateral trade negotiations (MTN) in 1975 called the Industry Center for Trade Negotiations (ICTN). Hollis rose to become the youngest vice president in NAM’s history. In early 1973, Hollis authored another study on trade adjustment assistance based on a six months research campaign which drew acclaim. A third report and proposed framework for industry-government preparations had a significant influence on the consultative process adapted by the U.S. Department of Commerce and the Office of the Special Trade Representative. A fourth published report also based on a widespread survey of corporate attorneys focused on U.S. anti-trust law as an impediment to U.S. competitiveness was well received.

Hollis also gained prominence during this period by organizing the first large conferences convening U.S. business leaders with Soviet and Arab industrial and agricultural counterparts which later fostered highly successful trade/industrial follow-up missions to the USSR and various countries in the North Africa and Persian Gulf region in 1973–1974, respectively.

In mid-1975 Hollis relinquished his NAM position to become chief executive of the newly established ICTN with over 150 corporate sponsors and moved to Switzerland to set up its Geneva office near the MTN. By late fall, however, the entire Tokyo Round had ground to a halt as wary Europeans decided to await the results of the U.S. Presidential elections. Hollis returned to Washington, and later resigned this position after arranging for a freelance journalist to forward Geneva reports to ICTN members – and began working for Jimmy Carter’s election campaign. He also established a private consulting business. After Carter’s election, Hollis supplied ideas on international economic policy and organization to the Carter Transition Team. Later, with congressional support, he received a presidential appointment as Deputy Coordinator for the Office of Reimbursable Development (RDP) in the Office of AID’s Administrator John J. Gilligan, a former governor (D-OH). RDP was the forerunner of the U.S. Trade and Development Program (TDP) and focused on technical assistance to energy-surplus developing countries which could afford to purchase training and services. Hollis traveled extensively, particularly in OPEC countries, convincing U.S. ambassadors to install RDP attaches and encourage greater use of USG programs from a wide array of federal agencies (not an easy argument for non-aid countries where hostility to AID was clear).

In this capacity, Hollis also represented AID at a series of bilateral meetings, most notably in Nigeria, Trinidad/Tobago, Saudi Arabia, Sudan and Iran.

Hollis’ private meetings with senior government officials in many countries convinced him of the need to formalize trilateral assistance utilizing U.S. expertise and OPEC petrodollars in African agricultural projects, and he pioneered several efforts in Sudan and Somalia after announcing the initiative at a U.S. commercial counselors’ conference in Nairobi in February 1978.

In 1980, after leaving AID over political disagreements in the establishment of a trilateral office, Hollis returned to the Middle East organized a high-level series of programs, and provided consulting services across a wide variety of trilateral projects including the Kenana Sugar scheme of R.W. “Tiny” Rowland (Lonrho PLC) in central Sudan, Saudi-Sudanese Red Sea Commission, Egyptian agricultural aviation training, the U.S.-Saudi Business Council and the US-Arab Business Roundtable. While consulting with the Saudi-Sudanese Red Sea Commission, Hollis became acquainted with its chairman, H.E. Dr. Ahmed Zaki Yamani, Saudi Arabia's famous oil minister.

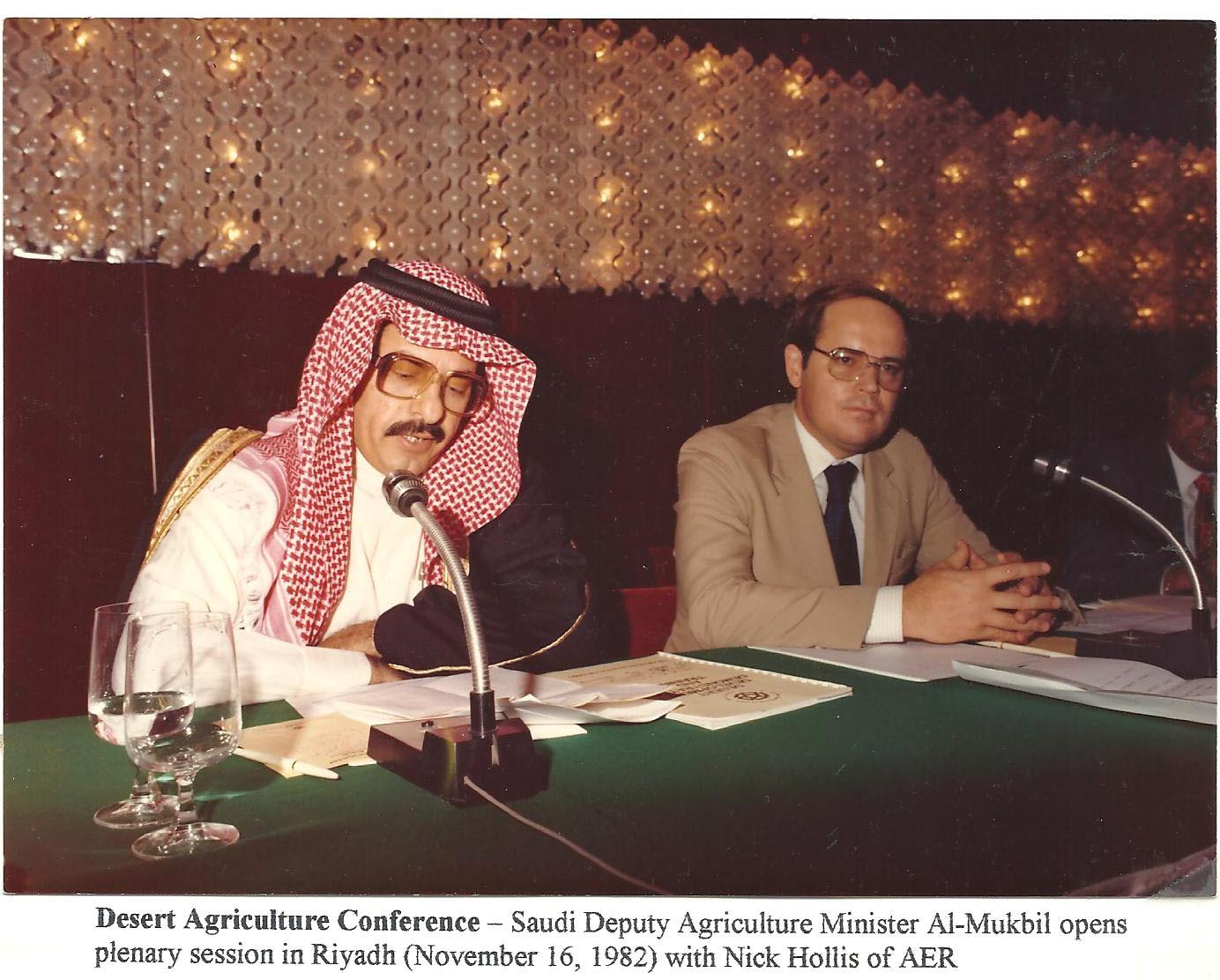

=== Agri-Energy Roundtable ===
These experiences led Hollis to found the Agri-Energy Roundtable (AER), a multilateral dialogue forum convening food and energy-surplus country officials with business leaders in 1980. After AER’s first conference in New Orleans, a few weeks after the Carter Administration instituted the Soviet grain embargo, Hollis attracted the support of Dr. Armand Hammer, controversial chairman of Occidental Petroleum Corporation, Robert O. Anderson, chairman of Atlantic Richfield and Diamond A Cattle Company, and political patronage via the legendary U.S. Senator Jennings Randolph (D-WV), the “Last of the New Dealers”—and quickly propelled AER as a formidable international nongovernmental forum with annual conferences in Geneva, Switzerland. Senator Randolph became the de facto chairman and led the U.S. delegations to seven consecutive annual AER conferences (1981–1987) in Switzerland, often bringing other senators, senior government leaders, and U.S. industrialists—while Hollis gathered international representatives from his global contact network. The forum soon became recognized on the world stage and received United Nations accreditation as an NGO in 1985 by declaration of the UN secretary-general. This recognition came after a highly successful AER mission/conference series in People's Republic of China and PRC participation on the AER board.

By 1987, AER had expanded with a growing corporate sponsor base which included some of the world’s premier companies in agriculture and energy. In addition to its annual meeting and task force programs on renewable energy, non-conventional finance, environment, new agricultural and food technologies, AER began establishing independent counterpart associations via regional conferences (India, Philippines, Uganda, Nigeria, the Gambia, the Persian Gulf and Egypt). Some of these events were coordinated with the U.N. World Food Council ministerial sessions and UNIDO. Around this same time AER formed an alliance with The Agribusiness Council (ABC) – an independent U.S. nonprofit association which later became the de facto U.S. chapter of the AER umbrella.

Both AER, and more recently ABC, have received grants from the World Bank, UNIDO and U.S. government agencies to provide training and expand the network of indigenous counterpart associations. In 1995, ABC successfully assisted the establishment of an independent Polish ABC with a Hollis-led ABC team traveling to more than fifteen cities and towns around the country to present seminars and recruit support in less than two months. A similar campaign in Kenya (1998) and Lithuania (2001–02) showed promising early results, but fell short due to budget cuts. Other programs with adequate support took root in Sri Lanka, Jamaica, and the Dominican Republic.

During more recent years Hollis has concentrated ABC efforts on building state agribusiness councils, providing information services to subcommittee projects including heritage and historical recognition (e.g., Jennings Randolph Recognition Project, General Longstreet Recognition Project, William Jennings Bryan Recognition Project and others), lecture tours with universities and historical groups, ethanol transparency and international development designed to enhance more balanced trade and food systems development worldwide.

Hollis has become a leading adversary of the ADM-led biofuels/ethanol campaign after delivering a speech at a U.S. Department of Justice-sponsored National White Collar Crime Summit in St. Louis (1998). He resides in Washington, D.C., with his wife and is a frequent speaker on heritage subjects, particularly related to the Civil War and genealogy. Hollis also occasionally lectures and teaches at the Washington International School (WIS) on history subjects at the senior grade level.

== Significant speeches/publications ==
A prolific author, Hollis has authored dozens of articles, publications and speeches over the years (see sample list below):

Competitive Export Financing for the ‘70s, U.S. Chamber of Commerce, (1970)

The New Conscience: U.S. Export Imperative and World Change, NAM Speech before Export Managers Association of Southern California, Los Angeles, (1972)

Trade Adjustment Assistance- U.S. Industrial Competitiveness and Implications For Domestic Adjustment Policy, NAM, (1973)

U.S.-Soviet Trade Conference Proceedings and Follow-on Activities, NAM, 1973 (Containing Proposal for Council for American-Soviet Trade (CAST), which became a model for the US-USSR Trade and Economic Council founded in October 1973)

Importance of Non-Tariff Barriers in the 1974 Negotiations, NAM Speech before American Boiler Manufacturers Association, Washington, DC (1974)

Industrial Mission to the Middle East: U.S. Manufacturing Perspectives on the Middle East- Cornerstone for Cooperation, NAM, (1975)

A Balanced Search for Trade Reform, NAM Testimony before Senate Finance Committee Hearings, (1974)

The International Implications of U.S. Antitrust Laws: An Analysis of Global Economic Reality, NAM, (1975)

Industry Week, Is Anti-trust Sinking US Trade Efforts?, May 26, 1975, John H. Sheridan, PP.23-36.

A Closer Look at Non-Tariff Barriers: A Report from U.S. Industry, NAM, (1975)

A Proposal: Industry Center for Trade Negotiations (ICTN), NAM, (1975)

The Potential Role of U.S. Industry in a Bilateral Assistance Program in LDCs, Report for USAID/Science and Technology (October 1976)

U.S.- Nigeria Technology and Economic Development Conference Proposal, AID/RDP, (Presented as part of the Carter-Obasanjo ‘talking points’ at White House, 1977)

Trilateral Economic Development Working Paper, AID/RDP, (Prepared for White House and Development Assistance Committee/OECD-Paris-1978)

Bushel for a Barrel? Article on Mexico’s Food Security, Feedstuffs, (November 10, 1980)

Egypt Seeks Food Security, article AgriBusiness Worldwide magazine, 1980 (Report on US –Egypt Agricultural Conference, Alexandria, Egypt June 1980)

US Agribusiness and the Energy Rich Nations: Partners for Agricultural Development in the ‘80s, Published Proceedings (AER), New Orleans, (1980)

Agri-Energy Interdependence: Opportunities and Realities for Business in the 80s, AER Published Proceedings (1981)

Food/Energy Security: Managing the New Technologies, AER Published Proceedings, (1982)

Beyond Food/Energy Security: New Agribusiness Markets and Technologies, AER 1983 Published Proceedings (includes PRC Mission to Henan)

Managing Agro-Economic Peacekeeping: Trade and Development Realities for Food Security, AER1984 Published Proceedings (includes Stratford-on-Avon conference)

Agro-Enterprise in Development: New Leadership and Technology for Food Security AER 1985-86 Published Proceedings (1987)

Entrepreneurship and Voluntary Business Groups in Economic Development, Speech before the General Union of Arab Chambers of Commerce, Industry and Agriculture

Kuwait, US-Arab Business Roundtable (USABR), 1981

Behind the Agro-Financial Crunch, AER article (March 1983)

Agri-Energy Perspectives in the Caribbean Basin, Speech before USDA Conference on Reagan Caribbean Initiative, Miami, 1983 (AER)

Russian Roulette: Ag Subsidies and World Trade Negotiations, Speech before International Farm Managers Association, Minneapolis, 1986

Perils in Abundance: An International Perspective in U.S. Agricultural Competitiveness, Speech before American Society of Agronomy, Atlanta, 1987

Non-Governmental Organizations in African Industry Development, Speech before UNIDO African Industry Ministers Conference, Harare, 1989

New Realities for Dealing with East Europe Economies: Lessons Learned, Speech before American Bar Association, Chicago, April 1990

Strengthening Agro-Industry Non-governmental Organization in Africa: An Underutilized Potential, AER speech before AER/Uganda Inaugural Conference Kampala, 1991

Grassroots Agribusiness Associations: New Links for Global Marketing, Speech before USDA National Marketing Conference, Louisville, KY (1993)

A Report from the Potomac: William Daley and the NAFTA Campaign, Speech before the Washington State Ag-Showcase Conference, Yakima, WA (1993)

Aspects of the Agriculture and Energy Relationship, article World Agriculture, London 1993

Grassroots Agribusiness Organization: New Channels for Rural Revitalization, Speech ABC before National Agricultural Credit Committee, Washington, 1996

Strengthening Grassroots Agro-Industry Non-Governmental Organization: An Under Utilized Potential for Food Security, speech before US Forum for World Food Summit 1996

World Food Summit: Fiasco or Consensus Platform for Food Security? Report on FAO World Food Summit Rome 1996

Archer Daniels Midland: A Case Study of Corruption in the Ag/Food Sector, Speech before Economic Crime Summit – Department of Justice/NWCCC, St. Louis 1998

Agribusiness and Bioenergy: Dysfunctional Partnerships and Anti-Competitive Behavior, Speech before BioEnergy ’98 (Department of Energy), Madison, Wisconsin 1998

(See Agribusiness Council (ABC) Publications section for more recent speeches)

== Honorary ==
Member, National Vocational Education Training Council (HEW-1973), European Parliament Young Leader Grant (1974), House Select Committee on Hunger (1985), Sultanate of Oman "Green Oman" Award (1989), Marquis Who's Who (2002).
