= Inter-Industry Advisory Council for Trade Negotiations =

Established in late 1972, the Inter-Industry Council for Trade Negotiations (IIAC-TN) by National Association of Manufacturers (NAM) staff director for International Economic Affairs (IEA) Nicholas E. Hollis- was initially designed to mobilize an industry-wide study of non-tariff barriers (NTBs) to bolster industry support for stronger participation in the multilateral trade negotiations process.

== Early development ==
IIAC-TN was launched as a project of NAM's Task Force on NTBs chaired by Samuel E. MacArthur, chairman and chief executive of Federal-Mogul Corporation - a Fortune 500 ball bearing manufacturing company headquartered outside Detroit - and began mobilizing during a conference held on November 10, 1972, in Washington, D.C. The convened group of industry trade association executives, representing some twenty major sectors were encouraged by Peter M. Flanigan, assistant to President Nixon for international economic affairs and also heard a proposed action plan presented by N.E. Hollis, who provided survey kits for NTB fact-finding to each attendee which could be replicated by each association as their own project

== Creation of Inter-Association Trade Group (IATG) ==
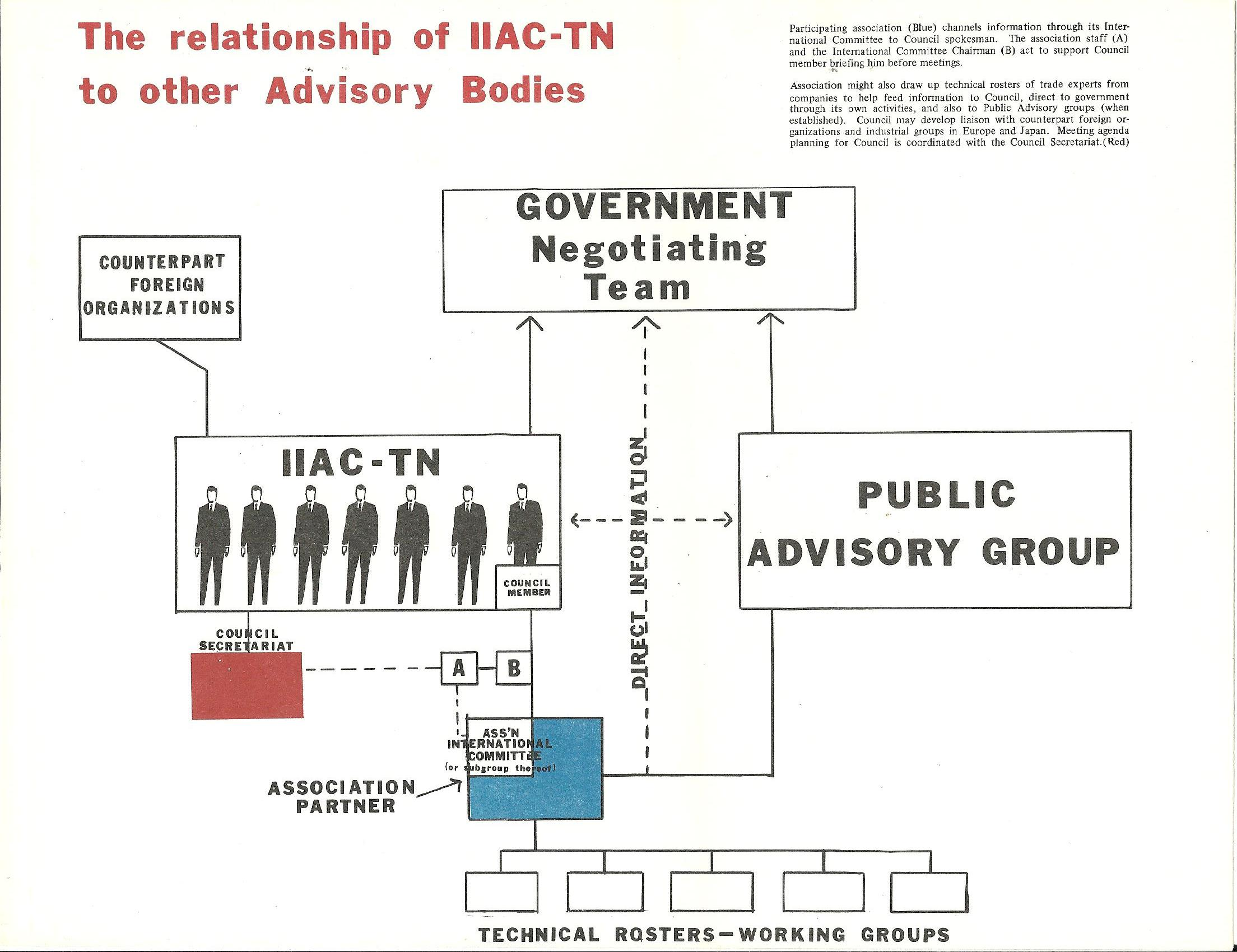
The Relationship of IICA-TN to other advisory board.

At a follow-up conference on April 24, 1973, the association presidents expressed their approval of a more ambitious plan based on the apparent success of their respective NTB project survey returns- and their industry members’ response—and the Inter-Association Trade Group (IATG) was formed later that year. IATG met regularly under NAM auspices and was staffed by NAM's IEA. Initially, IATG was chaired by NAM president E. Douglas Kenna, but later elected Malcolm R. Lovell, president of the Rubber Manufacturers Association (RMA) and a former undersecretary at the Department of Labor in the first Nixon Administration, as chair. IATG was a key component in the success of IIAC-TN proposal which later formed a robust campaign for the establishment of the Industry Center for Trade Negotiations (ICTN)- the first US industry trade negotiation monitoring association in 1975. IATG contributed to the rapid mobilization of industry-wide support for NAM/IEA leadership in other diverse projects such as passage of the Trade Reform Act of 1974, trade adjustment assistance reform, anti-trust regulatory reform and its international competitive implications. IATG also helped NAM's extended global outreach on the world stage exemplified in association leadership within the US-European Businessmen's Council (a program which Hollis initially sparked while serving in the US Chamber of Commerce several years earlier), the US-Soviet Trade Conference (February 1973) which convened nearly 900 US business executives with a high level Soviet delegation led by Vice Minister for Foreign Trade V.S. Alkhimov, and a follow up mission (creating the US-USSR Trade and Economic Council- see CAST) and the NAM's Industrial Mission to the Middle East (November 1974) seen as a positive response to the OPEC sparked petrodollar shock of late 1973
