= US–EEC Businessmen's Conference =

Former US Chamber of Commerce initiative

The U.S. – E.E.C. Businessmen’s Conference was an outreach initiative of the Chamber of Commerce of the United States which began in November 1970 with a series of exchanges and high-level meetings aimed at reassuring Europe’s business leaders and strengthening trans-Atlantic commercial ties during a period of trade and monetary instability. The turbulence became particularly acute surrounding the August 1971 Nixon Administration decision to decouple the Dollar from gold – a de facto devaluation along with the rise of protectionist sentiment embodied in the Burke-Hartke legislation advanced by American trade unions. After eight months of intense planning and numerous trips to Europe led by Chamber president Archie K. Davis (Chairman of Wachovia Bank) and the Chamber’s international group executive Nicholas E. Hollis, the resultant framework and momentum produced a three-day conference at Versailles outside Paris. The conference convened nearly 100 top industrialists and bankers at the historic Trianon Palace Hotel—and led to the creation of an ongoing organization called the U.S.-E.C. Business Council, as well as laying the foundation for the Trilateral Commission.

== Origins ==
The U.S.-E.E.C. Businessmen’s Conference (US-EC) emerged from a concept paper presented in late 1970 before the Chamber’s International Committee which sparked formation of a special Task Force on US-EEC Trade Relations. Although initial concern centered on EEC expansion and the potential of United Kingdom accession, a positive exchange of letters occurred between the Task Force and officials at the European Communities offices in Washington (approved by Brussels) and encouragement by Nathaniel Samuels (Undersecretary of State for Economic Affairs).

Following a Chamber leadership transition, incoming president Archie Davis quickly adopted the US-EC theme in his talking points during a speaking tour of American Chambers of Commerce in Europe. (Note: His predecessor, F. Ritter Shumway, Chamber president 1970-71, had corresponded with European counterparts in April). As a banker, Davis was comfortable with monetary and investment issues, but shortly after conferring with George Champion (former Chase Manhattan Bank president), Davis realized he had unwittingly sparked competitive forces when David Rockefeller (Chase’s new chairman) began to show particular interest. Rockefeller, a founder of the Emergency Committee for American Trade (ECAT), considered improving trans-Atlantic economic relations among his priorities, and regarded the Chamber’s international efforts as flat-footed and ineffectual. Perhaps fearing he would be overshadowed and/or outmaneuvered, Davis wrote Secretary of State William P. Rogers to stake out the Chamber’s conference theme on July 2 with copies shown to seven other Nixon cabinet members, as well as a number of sub-cabinet-level officials, including Peter G. Peterson.

== Building a steering committee from the heartland ==
Davis next convened a steering committee to sound out the idea with leading industrialists in Chicago in late July. Encouraged by his host, Borg Warner chief Robert S. Ingersoll, and other leaders around the table (including William Blackie, chairman, Caterpillar Tractor; R.C. Gerstenberg, vice chairman of General Motors; Ian MacGregor, chairman of American Metal Climax; Charles F. Myers, chairman of Burlington Industries; Carl A. Gerstacker, chairman of Dow Chemical; and others), Davis felt he had a mandate, pledging another planning meeting in mid September, after taking further organizational steps in Europe.

== European planning ==
Sensing urgency, on August 1, Davis rushed to Paris to begin assembling an informal counterpart body of European business leaders. He was relying on logistical support from US Ambassador Arthur Watson, but quickly discovered in Watson’s absence that most European (especially French) business leaders are rarely in their offices in August. Other, more demanding complications began to set in on issues surrounding venue selection, agenda, organizing secretariat for the European side, finances, and the selection process for European participation. By September 15, Davis had been forced to broaden the agenda (to include trade and European Union enlargement) following the August 15 devaluation of the Dollar by the Nixon Administration. Tensions ran high at the next Steering Committee meeting at General Motors offices above Manhattan (September 15). There was even suggestion that the entire effort be scuttled.

== Steering committee pressure mounts ==
Throughout the Fall, as details were hammered out with behind-the-scenes diplomacy, Davis’ idea of an informal “country club” symposium rapidly evolved into a carefully choreographed conference with functional steering committees, working groups and purposeful exchanges. Davis continued to resist pressure to place David Rockefeller in a leading position on monetary affairs—or to accept a widely held recommendation for European secretariat (UNICE in Brussels). But after a rocky November 19 Steering Committee meeting in Washington, with Robert Ingersoll and other members conveying National Security Advisor Henry Kissinger’s pressure for Rockefeller’s inclusion, Davis relented with some trade-offs, and Rockefeller was appeased.

== Seeds of trilateral dialogue ==
In December, Davis hurriedly met with UNICE president Paul Huvelin (also president of the French Patronat - the leading industrial organization). The meeting was strained due to language barriers, but Davis agreed to the Brussels-based UNICE as the European secretariat and graciously offered Chamber underwriting for much of the conference expense. Concessions to Rockefeller later would prove costly, as the wily internationalist took virtual control of the monetary session which sparked a fiery rebuttal from French finance minister (and later president) Valery Giscard d’Estaing, who scolded conferees on the “Dollar Indifference,” claiming short-term capital outflows and dollar inconvertibility posed a threat to the monetary truce in the West. His remarks nearly derailed the cooperative atmosphere of the conference. In the reportage on the conference, Rockefeller received most of the media attention along with some of his ECAT supporters, including Donald Kendall, chairman of Pepsico. A casual read of the New York Times on March 2 and 3 revealed no mention of either the Chamber or its indefatigable president, A.K. Davis. In fact, the news reports implied ECAT had organized the affair, while ignoring a joint communiqué, which paved the way for a three way dialogue including the Japanese business community.

== Historic irony at Versailles ==
Conference plenary sessions were held in the Clemenceau Room – with a twist of historical irony as this was the exact spot where the harsh Treaty of Versailles terms ending World War I were first read to the German delegation in May 1919 by Allied leaders, including U.S. President Woodrow Wilson. Many historians believe the resultant treaty signed a few days later was a major contributing factor leading to WWII. A gold plaque on the outside door gave evidence of the room’s somber past.

== Aftermath ==
Nonetheless, participants on both sides hailed the conference and its final dinner in the Galerie des Batailles as an “incontestable success.” Rockefeller wrote Davis that the conference was “very useful” and followed up two days later with a second letter stating more directly, “I want to commend you on putting together an assemblage of European and American businessmen the likes of which I have never seen in one place in Europe”.

A few months later, emboldened by discussions surrounding the ninth annual Japan-U.S. Businessmen’s Conference in San Francisco, March 16–19 (which was also staffed by the Chamber’s International Group), Rockefeller embarked upon forming the Trilateral Commission. The Chamber parried by spearheading a follow-up conference directed at US-EC agricultural trade issues on November 30 – December 1 in Brussels.

== Chamber- NAM cooperation opens new channels ==
In early February 1974, following cooperative discussions between Chamber chief Arch N. Booth, National Association of Manufacturers (NAM) president E. Douglas Kenna, and Commerce Secretary Fred Dent, the two business organizations fielded delegates to support a tripartite conference at Cerromar Beach outside San Juan, Puerto Rico, which included elements of the Japan-U.S Business Council executive committee along with U.S and European leaders. This conference led to the formal launch of the U.S.-E.C. Businessmen's Council at the Amigo Hotel in Brussels in late October 1974. For his role in staffing the U.S.-E.C. program, Nicholas Hollis received recognition by the European Parliament as a “Young Leader.”

== See also ==
- Euro-American relations
- Transatlantic Business Council
- Transatlantic Economic Council
- Transatlantic Free Trade Area (TFTA)
