= Meet the Boss =

American TV interview series (1952–1953)

- Genre: Business/public affairs
- Starring: Bill Cunningham; Marshall McNeil; Robert Sullivan
- Country of origin: United States
- Original language: English

Production
- Running time: 30 minutes

Original release
- Network: DuMont
- Release: June 10, 1952 – May 12, 1953

Meet the Boss is an American series broadcast on the DuMont Television Network from June 10, 1952, to May 12, 1953. The series was hosted initially by Bill Cunningham. Marshall McNeil replaced Cunningham on October 7, 1952. Robert Sullivan also hosted the show.

== Background and format ==
The program was a spinoff of the TV show Industry on Parade. DuMont executives asked the National Association of Manufacturers, which produced that program, to develop Meet the Boss, which was "[d]esigned to humanize industry and its executives." DuMont's program director, James L. Caddigan, developed the show.

The host of the show interviewed executives from American businesses about their own careers and about the industries in which they worked. Guests on one episode were Andrew Heiskell, publisher of Life; W. Paul Jones, president of Servel Inc.; and Joseph P. Spang, president of Gillette.

The show initially was broadcast on Tuesdays from 10:30 to 11 p.m. Eastern Time. On October 3, 1952, it moved to 10-10:30 p.m. E.T. on Tuesdays.

== Episode status ==
A single episode survives as part of the Peabody Award collection.

== Critical response ==
A review in The New York Times said, "The idea behind Meet the Boss is sound ... [b]ut the presentation's execution is faulty in almost every respect". It cited uncertainty on the parts of Cunningham and the show itself as to "what their point of view is to be." The review also noted that the program focused too much on praise of the companies represented ("straight press agentry"), while it failed to provide its own research about those companies. Another concern was time, with the reviewer commenting, "Any one of his guests last week was worth a half-hour by himself", in contrast to the three executives who appeared in the 30-minute episode.

== See also ==
- List of programs broadcast by the DuMont Television Network
- List of surviving DuMont Television Network broadcasts

== Bibliography ==
- David Weinstein, The Forgotten Network: DuMont and the Birth of American Television (Philadelphia: Temple University Press, 2004) ISBN 1-59213-245-6
