= US-Arab Business Roundtable =

The US-Arab Business Roundtable (USABR), was an American initiative that became a non-profit association in the early 1980s which conducted a series of conferences, workshops, trade missions and training programs at a critical juncture of history aimed at fostering regularized dialogue and improved understanding for strengthening US commercial and economic relations with Arab countries of North Africa and the Middle East. The roundtable was founded in March 1979.

== History ==
In 1979, in the wake of OPEC's second oil price shock (coordinated price increase) during the early days of the Carter Administration- which resulted in an enormous surge of petro-dollar wealth transfer to oil producing nations, including several in the Mideast/North Africa region, interest in improved mechanisms to nurture business and cultural understanding accelerated. Armed with high-level industry contacts and well-regarded in Middle East circles following the NAM Mid-East Industrial Mission of November 1974, Nicholas Everett Hollis visited the region on several occasions during the 1977-79 period – in both official and private capacities - and met with leading officials such as Dr. Zaki Mustafa of the Saudi-Sudanese Red Sea Commission, Dr. Ahmed Zaki Yamani, Saudi Arabia's famous petroleum minister, Soliman Al-Solaim, Saudi Arabia's Minister of Commerce, Sheikh Mohamed Abakhail, Saudi Arabia's Minister of Finance and others—and began advancing the proposal for a regular dialogue mechanism. In late 1978 Hollis prepared a proposal for a US-Saudi Business Council while visiting Jeddah – and the idea received encouragement from US Ambassador John West and others, including US Treasury officials connected with the Joint Economic Commission, who had worked with Hollis during his tenure at AID's reimbursable development program (RDP)

Later, the proposal was refined and broadened to include other Arab countries in coordination with the existing US-Arab Chamber of Commerce (New York) and the Saudi Chambers of Commerce. The concept was formally incorporated on March 9, 1979, with the immediate assignment of managing a large Pan Arab mission program visiting the United States, including conferences in New York, Washington and Chicago and promotion for a new, $175 million investment program initially subscribed out of the United Arab Emirates- called the General Arab Investment Company (GAIC) designed to stimulate joint ventures between US corporations and Arab partners in the Mideast. GAIC became the forerunner of the Arab Investment Company (TAIC) which today is owned jointly by 17 Arab states with capital in excess of US$800 Million.

The high-powered eighty man Arab delegation was led by Dr. Burhan Dajani, secretary general of the General Union of Arab Chambers of Commerce, Industry and Agriculture, Sheikh Ismail Abudawood, chairman of the Saudi Chambers of Commerce and Industry with financial leaders such as Saif Ghurair (representing H.E. Rached Ben Said Al-Maktoum of Dubai/UAE) and others in the wings.

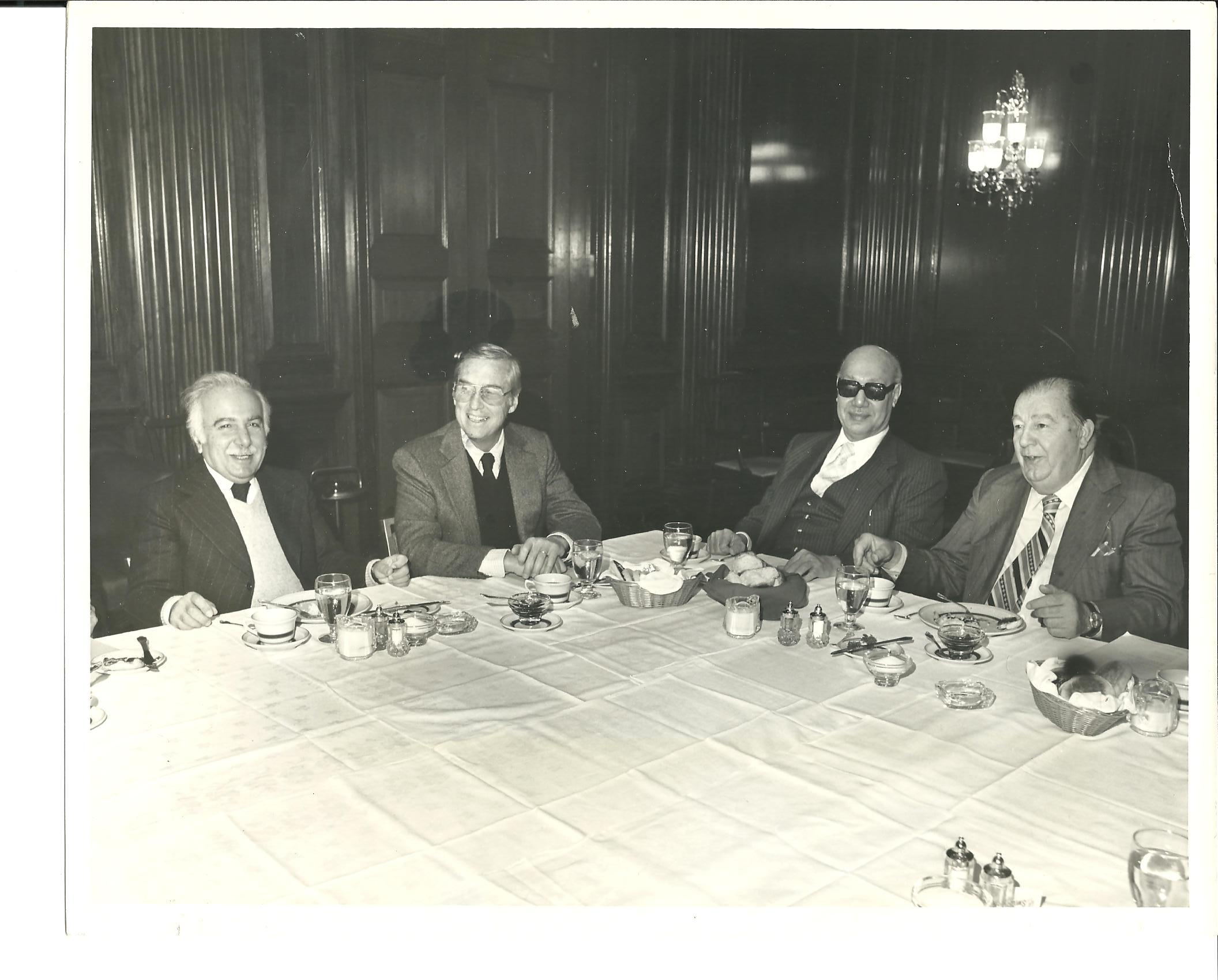
Senator Randolph hosts breakfast at Capitol. Right to left: Senator Jennings Randolph (D-WV), Sheikh Ismail Abudawood, Chairman Saudi Federation of Chambers of Commerce, Senator Lloyd Bentsen (D-TX), and Dr. Burhan Dajani, Secretary General, General Union of Arab Chambers of Commerce, Industry, and Agriculture. November 16, 1979. Sources: Courtesy of US-Arab Business Roundtable

In organizing the Washington portion of the mission program, Hollis encountered a series of logistical, scheduling and political hurdles which ultimately required persuasive skills and a high degree of luck to overcome. For example, during the final hours of the New York program Hollis was forced to procure private corporate jets to fly delegates to the Nation's capital since their departure from New York was delayed beyond the last shuttle by a United Nations reception quietly slipped into the schedule well after the Washington program of workshops and appointments had been set.

Without the intervention of corporate friends, the Arab delegates would have been forced to miss early morning meetings at the US Capitol- possibly the high point of their visit. Hollis utilized corporate sponsors of USABR to scramble two jets and delivered a leadership group from the delegation in the early hours of November 16, 1979. Later, that morning, after a breakfast hosted in the Capitol by U.S. Senator Jennings Randolph (D-WV) which included other prominent colleagues (i.e. Senator Lloyd Bentsen (D-TX), Senator Charles H. Percy (R-IL), Representative John Brademas (Majority Whip- D-NY), Representative Gillis Long (D-LA) and others) the Arab leaders were ushered into a private meeting with then Senate Majority Leader Robert C. Byrd (D-WV).

It was a significant meeting as Byrd had recently been dispatched as President Carter's envoy to visit Saudi Arabia and the news wires were buzzing over the Administration's decision to freeze Iranian financial assets in the wake of the US Embassy seizure in Tehran on November 4. The US Capital was in a high state of alert. Later, that morning Hollis led the Arab group to a meeting at the US Treasury with Undersecretary Anthony Solomon and then reconvened with sixty business leaders at the Hyatt Hotel for a luncheon and afternoon workshop. The luncheon was chaired by William L. Wearly, chairman of Ingersoll Rand and John C.Marous, president of Westinghouse Electric International. Dr. Burhan Dajani, secretary general of the General Union of Arab Chambers of Commerce and Sheikh Abudawood spoke for the Arab delegation . Considerable discussion focused on the General Arab Investment Company (GAIC). The U.S. Department of State was represented by Ambassador Joseph W. Twinam, a deputy assistant secretary in the Near Eastern and North Africa Bureau.

The Washington USABR meeting was featured in an article in the Christian Science Monitor on November 30 testifying to the below-the-radar approach which steered the program to success against enormous odds. Later, a beleaguered Mohamed Baghal, executive director of the US Arab Chamber of Commerce(USACC) (and a co-incorporator of USABR) would personally express appreciation of the Arab delegation to Hollis in Chicago. USABR had been designated by name in the delegation working paper as a vehicle for joint venture facilitation with GAIC. The USABR debut had been a good one. Roy Lidicker's academic article, “Political Power and the Arab Oil Weapon” was published in 1988 and delves into the economic rationale behind the USABR, and the ramifications of the changing economic strategy in the Middle East.

Later, Hollis utilized USABR to advance a special agricultural conference organized in Alexandria, Egypt for July 7–10, 1980. After a series of planning meetings at the law firm of Patton Boggs & Blow, Hollis assumed leadership of the US business delegation to the conference. Working with Richard Lyng of the American Meat Institute (later Reagan's Secretary of Agriculture) and Clifford Cox, vice chairman of Greyhound Corporation, Hollis fielded a twenty-man delegation, attracted House Speaker Thomas Foley (D-WA) and played a galvanizing role coordinating the academic and government participation as well. The conference entitled “The Economic Challenges of Peace: Agriculture and Economic Transition in Egypt” proved highly successful. A highlight of the program was a private meeting with Egyptian President Anwar Sadat in his garden outside Alexandra. The Nobel Peace prize winning statesman was gracious and relaxed with his astounded guests who had come to the estate expected to have tea with Mrs. Gihan Sadat.

== Presentation before General Union of Arab Chambers (Kuwait) ==
USABR also figured prominently in a number of follow-up activities including the October meetings of JECOR at the Treasury Department with Saudi leaders seeking to activate the US-Saudi Business Council proposal. Later in 1981 Hollis received a coveted invitation to address the General Union of Arab Chambers in Kuwait—possibly the only American ever to receive this honor. On February 3, Hollis delivered a speech entitled “Entrepreneurship and Voluntary Business Groups: The Role of Chambers of Commerce in Economic Development” which was translated into Arabic and circulated widely in the Arab world. The speech also received considerable local media attention. Hollis drew on his experience with the US Chamber of Commerce, the National Association of Manufacturers (NAM) and history to provide his presentation.

USABR's success had been precariously balanced between rival groups of the Arab chambers of commerce- where cooperation was difficult to obtain or sustain over any period – particularly among the US Arab chamber groups –where rivalry was often destructive. Hollis once compared his predicament to the legendary T. E. Lawrence ("Lawrence of Arabia") trying to cobble alliances in the Near East during World War I. USABR dissolved, its functions subsumed with the rise of a separate non-profit, the Agri-Energy Roundtable (AER) which concentrated on agricultural and energy development and based its annual meetings from Geneva, Switzerland (after 1980). Another non-profit association, the National Council on US-Arab Relations, formed in 1983, began serving various bilateral/regional functions in the ongoing dialogue.

The Agri-Energy Roundtable (AER), convened delegates from energy-surplus countries. A supporter of Hollis, U.S. Senator Jennings Randolph (D-WV) chaired the annual conferences for 7 years (1981 – 1987). The AER, received accreditation from the United Nations as a non-governmental organization in 1985.

== Sources ==
- US State Department UNCLAS cable #186568 ( July 19, 1979) – Subject: General Union Of Arab Chambers of Commerce Plan Visit to US
- Arab Business Leaders to Visit US, US-Arab Chamber of Commerce Magazine (August 1979)
- Wall Street Journal, “Houston Clearance for Mideast Freight Becomes a Hot Issue” (July 31, 1979)
- Working paper “American-Arab Economic Opportunities and Realities in the 1980s”(prepared by the secretariat of the General Union of Arab Chambers of Commerce, Nov 1979)
- Arab-American Roundtable for the Transfer of Technology: The Arab Perspective (Dubai/UAE)(prepared by the secretariat of the General Union of Arab Chambers of Commerce, Nov 1979)
- Arab-American Roundtable for the Transfer of Technology: The Arab Perspective (Dubai/UAE)
- Letter: Walter J. Stewart, Secretary for the Majority Leader, United States Senate to M. Baghal, US Arab Chamber of Commerce, November 9, 1979
- USABR Program: “New Mechanisms and Forecasts for the 80s”, Hyatt Regency Hotel, Washington, D.C. November 16, 1979
- Memorandum USABR U.S.-Saudi Business Dialogue Meeting, October 3–4, 1980
- Arab News, (Kuwait/KUNA) “Arab Chambers Review Economic Integration”, February 4, 1981
- Agribusiness Reporter, “Egypt Seeks Food Security” article by Nicholas E. Hollis, Oct/Nov. 1980, pp. 8–11
- Journal of Commerce, “International Group Urges Build-Up of Agriculture”, H. Peter Dreyer, April 23, 1981
