= Agri-Energy Roundtable =

Agri-Energy Roundtable (AER) is a nonprofit and non-governmental organization accredited by the United Nations and established in 1980 as a forum for encouraging dialogue on cooperative energy and agricultural development between industrialized and developing nations. AER conducts international conferences, regional seminars and workshops, trade missions and technical assistance for the formation of autonomous indigenous counterpart associations.

== Origins ==
Undertaken as a conference project in mid-1979, the agri-energy concept evolved into an independent forum following a New Orleans meeting held February 7–9, 1980 which attracted business and government leaders from energy-surplus nations. The first conference benefited from the Carter Administration’s Soviet grain embargo - announced weeks earlier - which created unprecedented congestion at the Port of New Orleans. Undersecretary of Agriculture Dale E. Hathaway keynoted the event which attracted major agricultural interest, including the American Farm Bureau Federation, as well as media exposure nationally. Among the corporate sponsors was the chairman of Occidental Petroleum Corporation- Dr. Armand Hammer.

AER was formally incorporated in March 1980 by Nicholas Everett Hollis as a non-profit association. Hollis had conceived organized and conducted the New Orleans conference. and recognized the potential for a forum. Later, AER produced a publication entitled “The Agri-Energy Roundtable 1980- U.S. Agribusiness and the Energy-Rich Nations: Partners for Agricultural Development in the ‘80s”. The document featured themes of trilateral development Hollis had championed while in the State Department as well as a compilation of papers presented at the conference Hollis also used contacts in the Mid-East to advance the AER and helped organize an Egyptian agricultural conference in Alexandria in July.

== Building a multilateral forum ==
Determined to broaden AER's international profile, Hollis mobilized European contacts and began organizing a program in Switzerland with encouragement from US Senator Jennings Randolph and Dr. Armand Hammer. These plans were also advanced in the Arab world following a speech before the General Union of Arab Chambers of Commerce on February 3 in Kuwait.

During AER's Geneva conference April 27–29 at the Intercontinental Hotel Senator Randolph presided over a gathering which included Occidental Petroleum's president A. Robert Abboud, Dr. Satmoko Soedirdjo, Organization of Petroleum Exporting Countries (OPEC), Warren Lebeck, president of the Chicago Board of Trade, Edgard Pisani, European Commissioner and member of the Brandt Commission, Chief Alhaji Bamalli, a Nigerian agribusiness leader and many others.

In July AER organized a Capitol Hill luncheon for Dr. Hammer and Senator Randolph at which more than a dozen senators participated. Later that year AER conducted meetings for advisory committees in Washington and Geneva- and hosted a one-day conference on agricultural training with the Johns Hopkins School of Advanced International Studies (SAIS) in December.

== Further progress ==
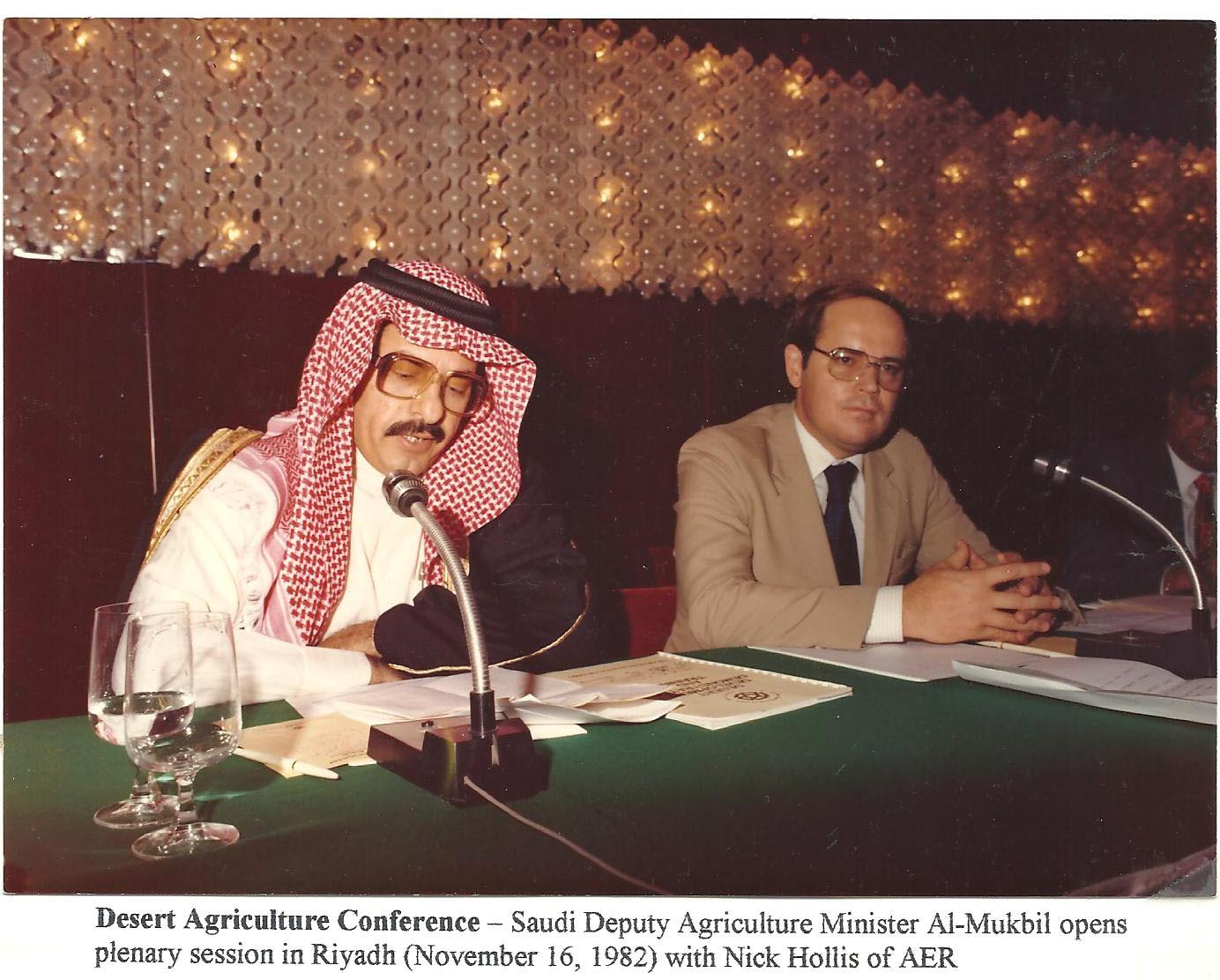

By spring 1982 AER was gathering recognition in the energy-surplus nations, particularly in the Middle East. The third annual AER held in Geneva May 23–26 produced a breakthrough with Saudi minister for agriculture and water Dr. A. Al-Sheikh and Senator Randolph forging a head table dialogue – and a pledge for continued cooperation on agricultural exchanges. Later that year AER organized a seminar of barter/counter-trade in agriculture and formed a subcommittee on these trade finance issues.

In November, AER produced a worldwide mission linked with four independent conferences in Riyadh, Singapore, Bangkok and Hawaii. The final conference was held at the Maui Intercontinental, with a keynote speech by Robert O. Anderson, chairman of Atlantic Richfield and AER began attracting more corporate sponsors.

In early February 1983 Senator Randolph hosted another Capitol Hill luncheon with featured speaker Robert O. Anderson discussing the overvalued dollar and its negative impact on U.S. trade to an audience in the Senate Russell building which included Paul Volcker, Federal Reserve Board chairman, Jacques d. Rosiere, head of the IMF, a number of senators and business leaders. Later, that spring Randolph and Anderson teamed up at the fourth AER (May 23–26) to spark another program success which included representatives from the People's Republic of China (PRC) The conference was reported in the London Observer newspaper.

== Mission to China ==
Falling oil and commodity prices along with unfavorable economic conditions stymied AER's membership expansion. In late fall Hollis traveled to China – visiting Beijing and Zhengzhou (Henan). After meetings and tours Hollis negotiated a memorandum of agreement with Henan authorities (November 3) which resulted in an international AER mission and workshop series in China (March 16–24, 1984). The 24 member AER delegation represented six countries and was led by Gustavo de los Reyes D. president of Rio Yaracuy Ranch Venezuela (King Ranch). Follow-up PRC representation on the AER board resulted in another AER achievement –United Nations accreditation (recognition) of AER as a non-governmental organization.

== Agricultural subsidies ==
The fifth international AER annual meeting in Geneva (May 27–30) saw Senator Randolph introduce a colleague, US Senator Edward Zorinsky (D-NE), who challenged the international forum to press GATT for successful agricultural negotiations and a reduction of European subsidies. Years later the same issues pitting the US, Europe and the emerging nations would resurface to frustrate trade negotiations, leading to the collapse of the Doha Round (July 2008)

In June AER attended the UN World Food Council ministerial meetings at Addis Ababa, Ethiopia as a non-governmental organization representing the private sector. In July AER organized a two-day seminar on agricultural technologies in partnership with the Royal Agricultural Society of England (RASE) at Stratford-upon-Avon, July 4–6. Hollis used his participation at these annual UK events to solidify high level industry support throughout the Commonwealth.

AER primary sponsors in the UK included Imperial Chemical Industries (ICI) plc, Taylor Woodrow plc,., Paterson-Zochonis, Prudential Bache Trading, Universal Leaf Tobacco and others. Sir Ian MacGregor, chairman of the National Coal Board and Prime Minister Margaret Thatcher’s chief industrial advisor, was instrumental in generating support for AER in the UK MacGregor had been a close Hollis ally as a founding member of the US-European Business Council at the Versailles conference of March 1972.

During this same period the subcommittee on counter-trade began meeting in London under the chairmanship of Andreas Calice of Prudential-Bache Trading in response to the recognition that debt was choking trade with much of the Third World.

== West African outreach ==
In late 1984 Hollis was invited to visit Nigeria at the inspiration of several sponsors who had hoped to organize an African regional conference in Lagos. This effort was pursued for eighteen months but was suspended when it was determined that local sponsors could not assure a conference success. The campaign did spark interest in establishing an indigenously supported counterpart Agri-Energy Roundtable/Nigeria.

== Competition for public funding ==
Shortly after retiring his Senate seat, Jennings Randolph assumed the chairmanship of AER and visited AID Administrator M. Peter McPherson to request program assistance to enable the Roundtable to develop its task force and subcommittee activities for more substantive focus in various agro-food processing, distribution, technology and finance sectors. This approach would have insured greater private sector participation as well which appealed to the Reagan Administration. However, just as the AID interest in the proposal seemed to gel, a reorganization at the White House undercut higher level encouragement at a critical juncture and AID's Bureau for Science and Technology (S&T) itself underwent a sharp downsizing- which effectively left AER's proposal shelved and unnoticed. It is worth noting that AID was under pressure to terminate its ongoing support for a USDA backed group called the Joint Agricultural Consultative Committee (JACC) after internal reviews cited poor performance and other issues. JACC was considered competitive with AER.

AER staff pulled out of the quicksand of AID meetings and produced a Sixth annual International Agriculture Forum in Geneva, June 2–5, 1985. Senator Randolph introduced James Ingram, executive director of the World Food Programme and presided over a gathering which featured representations from nearly forty countries. A letter from President Reagan was read to the conferees. AER opened a Geneva office, staffed by Carl Bjertnes and Brooks Ford.

== Participation at UN World Food Council Meetings ==
AER fielded a small delegation to represent private enterprise at the UN World Food Council ministerial conference in Paris (June 10–13) led by Gustavo de los Reyes. AER celebrated its new status as an officially accredited non-governmental organization before the United Nations.

Following these meetings, Hollis met with James Callaghan, former UK prime minister at the Royal Show and Callaghan agreed to help advance AER in the Commonwealth. Callaghan had been familiar with AER through Lord Walston, a former Labour minister for development and one of the UK's leading agriculturalists.

== Self-help Solutions for Africa’s Food Security ==
AER continued its campaign for the private sector, self-help solutions in Africa- as contrasted with famine relief programs of Bob Geldof which captured the public imagination with video and musical appeals linked with the Ethiopian tragedy. However AER had difficulty finding a suitable base from which to launch an African operation.

Nonetheless, in September 1985 AER hosted a Washington seminar on Africa and later Hollis revisited Nigeria where a workshop was conducted in Lagos aimed at mobilizing broader support for a West African regional conference. Texaco’s director on the AER board, Jean Poupeau- had pioneered a cassava farm demonstrating how a multinational oil company could contribute directly to a nation’s food security- by using its gas station network to distribute basic foodstuffs.(See TexAgri, Ltd) Later that year AER’s Hollis was invited by U.S. Representative Mickey Leland (D-Texas) to serve as an advisor to the House Select Committee on Hunger.

In the spring of 1986 AER began suffering a serious subscription/dues decline triggered by declining commodity prices, the retirement of key corporate supporters, and competitive forces led by Orville Freeman’s JACC. Although JACC collapsed in mid-1986, Freeman joined the Agriculture Council of America (ACA) from which he launched more broadsides. Significantly, a key ACA contributor was Freeman’s old friend, Dwayne Andreas, chairman of Archer Daniels Midland (ADM). ADM had been a contributing sponsor to AER but expressed dissatisfaction over AER’s refusal to actively promote ethanol and withdrew its support.

== International program momentum ==
AER’s international programming continued to generate momentum overseas. AER pursued public funding after receiving an invitation from Philippine Agriculture Minister Ramon Mitra to organize a conference in Manila. At the Seventh annual International Agriculture Forum in Geneva (May 25–28) three agriculture ministers participated (Turkey, Jordan and the Gambia) with Honorable Eugene F. Whelan, former Canadian minister of agriculture and president of the UN World Food Council, and Lord Harry Walston of the UK House of Lords also on the program. ”.

Organizationally, the AER board of directors and committee of honor gathered cohesion around Senator Randolph while other subcommittees similar in structure to the counter-trade/finance subgroup began to take shape. A strong outreach aimed at attracting Soviet high-level AER participation orchestrated from ICI and the US Embassy in Moscow produced no results.

== Philippine initiative broadens to ASEAN and South Asia ==
In the summer AER was invited by Philippine Ambassador Emmanuel Pelaez (former vice president under Ferdinand Marcos) to organize an agribusiness program during the state visit of newly inaugurated Philippine President Corazon Aquino to Washington in September. This program at the Madison Hotel was accomplished so successfully that Agriculture Minister Ramon Mitra invited AER staff to visit Manila and organize an ASEAN wide conference featuring Philippine agro-industry investment potentials. Hollis traveled to Manila in October and secured pledges from USAID/Philippines to provide seed grant funding for the conference. On this trip Hollis also visited Hong Kong and India and began discussions aimed at starting an AER counterpart association in Bombay (Mumbai).

Early in 1987 AER received a request from the chairman of a competitive association – The Agribusiness Council (ABC)—to form an alliance, The New York based ABC wanted a Washington presence and more international programming scope. After protracted negotiations and board approvals, a management services agreement was worked out whereby AER would assume day-to-day staff management of the Council which became a de facto U.S. affiliate of the international AER network.

AER overcame a funding logjam (working with Vice President George Bush's intervention) and proceeded to organize a conference at the Manila Hotel (May 24–27). and resulted in the formation of an indigenous, free-standing AER/Filpinas – the first international affiliate of AER under the elected leadership of Celso Al. Carunungan.

== A passage to India ==
AER's delegation then proceeded to Hong Kong and Mumbai where large meetings were conducted with local organizers interested in forming counterpart associations. In Mumbai, more than 100 Indian business leaders and local politicians turned out. The AER/India was inaugurated on May 29, 1987.

AER's Eighth Annual International Agriculture Forum (IAF) in Geneva (June 1–3, 1987) was chaired by Jennings Randolph- his seventh consecutive. Other country groups at the IAF were provided “starter kits” for association building and two new vice chairmen from Canada and the Gambia assisted Senator Randolph in conducting the conference.

== Forging new cooperation ==
In the fall AER began negotiating two agreements with AID and finalized terms of the alliance with the ABC. A board of directors meeting for ABC was organized on December 9 and the legal instruments were transferred from New York. At this meeting Hollis was elected president of the ABC. One of the AID grant contracts offered the promise of modest funding to accelerate training for AER counterpart association development in selected emerging countries over a three-year timeframe – with the potential for increases based on performance

Late in the year AER accepted an invitation to visit the Persian Gulf for the purpose of organizing a regional Roundtable. Hollis also visited India and the Philippines conducting board meetings and briefing the counterpart groups at each stop.

In March AER partnered with a new sponsor, the Tennessee Valley Authority (TVA) Office of Biomass and launched a special Subcommittee on Renewable Energy Technology. The two-day event at the Mayflower Hotel was chaired by John Shields of the TVA and included representatives of two dozen leading companies interested in renewable energy from solar, wind, geothermal, biomass and others primarily in relation to agriculture. Enthusiasm dropped a few weeks later when Shields resigned, claiming budget cuts would downsize TVA's commitment to biomass energy.

== High Tide for Agri-Energy Roundtable ==
The Ninth Annual International Agriculture Forum (June 5–8) attracted a Mideast and African attendance led by Saudi Arabian Minister of Agriculture Al-Sheikh. Three other ministers attended and AER hosted an event in their honor with a steamboat cruise on Lake Leman. AER Vice chairman Eugene Whelan (Canada) and Saihou Sabally (Gambia) co-chaired the conference. Delegations from AER counterpart associations, including India, Kenya and the UAE- added a new dynamism to the proceedings

Official interest at AID was growing, centering on the AER counterpart association development and training program. AID departments and USAID missions pressed to accelerate the process and/or “buy-in” with programs tailored to their agri-enterprise settings. In mid August AER met in London to finalize plans for the Gulf regional conference in UAE and to conduct meetings with the London-based non-conventional finance subgroup. Plans were announced for the formation of a new sub-group on transport/distribution related to agro-food systems.

In October AER combined with ABC to host a conference in St. Louis on the effects of the great North American drought on U.S. agricultural reliability and the transportation system. One of the sessions on high technology in agriculture attracted such interest that participating AID and USDA officials pledged funding for a sequel to be conducted by ABC on the more specialized theme of non-feed industrial uses for agriculture, biotechnology and other related themes. The proposed conference theme was “The Agro-Industrial Revolution”.

== Dire straits: Gulf Agro-Industrial Roundtable at Khorfakkan/UAE ==
In 1989 conducted two conference events in the Persian Gulf (Bahrain and UAE) in early February. The meetings received international participation and support, particularly from Saudi Arabia. A paper was presented by a UN official from Baghdad calling for Pan-Arab food security cooperation.

AER conducted meetings in Singapore, Brunei, Malaysia, Indonesia and the Philippines adding to momentum generated before the Gulf conference with a workshop in Manila on Agrarian Land Reform (February 2) at the Manila Garden Hotel.

== Barnstorming for food security ==
Throughout the remainder of the spring AER expanded its program horizons:

- in the Caribbean (Jamaica and Dominican Republic),
- in Europe (planning for the Tenth Annual International Agriculture Forum in Vienna, Austria,
- by attending the World Food Council ministerial conference in Cairo, Egypt, where AER conducted a parallel workshop for Egyptian agro-enterprise professionals interested in establishing an affiliated counterpart association,
- in East Africa (Nairobi) providing ideas/training for the local Kenyan start-up.
- and in Zimbabwe where Hollis addressed the Ninth UNIDO African Industry Ministers Conference.

At home ABC's agenda was advanced via meetings with its planning and Washington advisory committees. The aim was to consolidate and rehabilitate ABC using the organization of a large conference on new agricultural technologies. The idea had sprouted during the St. Louis conference and hinged on a grant pledge which AID's S&T Bureau had dangled.

In July Hollis resumed travels to New Delhi, conducting a workshop at the Oberoi Hotel with Indian business leaders, including Lala Bansidhar of DCM, S.K. Birla of Birla Industries and others (July 6). Hollis also briefed political leaders including Najma Heptulla and the Speaker of India's Parliament Bal Ram Jakhar. The aim was to jump start AER/India which had languished under weak leadership in Mumbai with an All-India format.

Hollis also visited Colombo for talks on sparking a counterpart association in Sri Lanka with allies developed via previous Geneva conferences. A key element was the potential USAID use of local currencies generated from the sale of US commodities under the Food for Peace program (described in a White House encouragement cable on November 3, 1987- see UNCLAS State 342248)

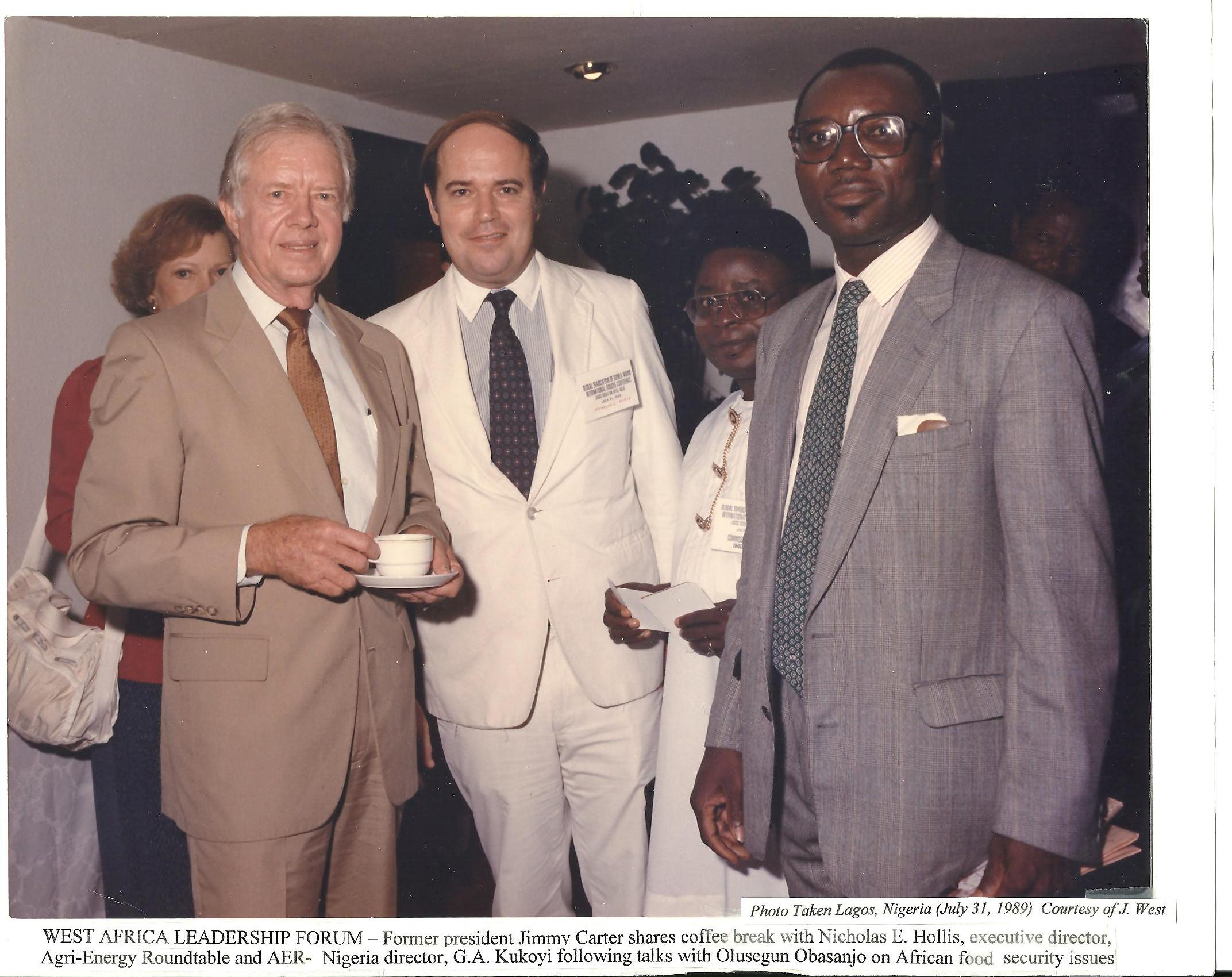
Growing AER recognition with international donor agencies was signaled with an invitation to UNDP’s African Leadership Forum at General Obasanjo’s farm in Ota, Nigeria. Hollis and several AER African directors participated in this conference on West African agriculture . During the visit a workshop was conducted at the Lagos Sheraton Hotel for AER/Nigeria development and the overall African program was discussed with former US President Jimmy Carter. As a follow-up UNDP circulated a worldwide cable to its regional offices encouraging support for the agro-enterprise association concept.

== Opening to the East: Tenth Annual Meeting in Vienna- October 1989 ==
AER’s Tenth Annual International Agriculture Form (October 8–11) in Vienna, Austria opened new doors for program expansion to Eastern Europe with strong delegations from Poland and Hungary. AER counterpart groups in formation, most notably from Kenya, Uganda and the Gambia, also field good groups. Over thirty five countries were represented and AER received the “Green Oman” award from the Sultanate of Oman in recognition of AER's recent contributions to regional food security and trade development in the Gulf region.

Following the Vienna meetings, AER senior director Gustavo de los Reyes led a 14-member delegation to Budapest, Hungary for two days of talks and field visits hosted by the Hungarian Ministry of Food and Agriculture. The Vienna conference also produced an invitation from the Polish Government to visit and organize an international roundtable in Warsaw.

== AER and the Counterpart Association Projects ==
Over the next five years AER concentrated its program momentum with Eastern Europe and East Africa developing programs, conferences and in-country training for counterpart association development. In November 1991 AER/Uganda was inaugurated at a conference sponsored by AER and local organizers. Uganda's vice president Dr. Samson Kisekka and several ministers presided at this conference at the Kampala Sheraton including Dr. S. Wandira Kazibwe, Minister of Women's Affairs, Youth and Culture and Mrs. Victoria Sekitoleko, Minister of Agriculture. As news of this program success rippled across Africa, other country organizers became encouraged to study the AER model – including Tanzania, Botswana, South Africa, Ghana, Senegal, Ethiopia and Eritrea.

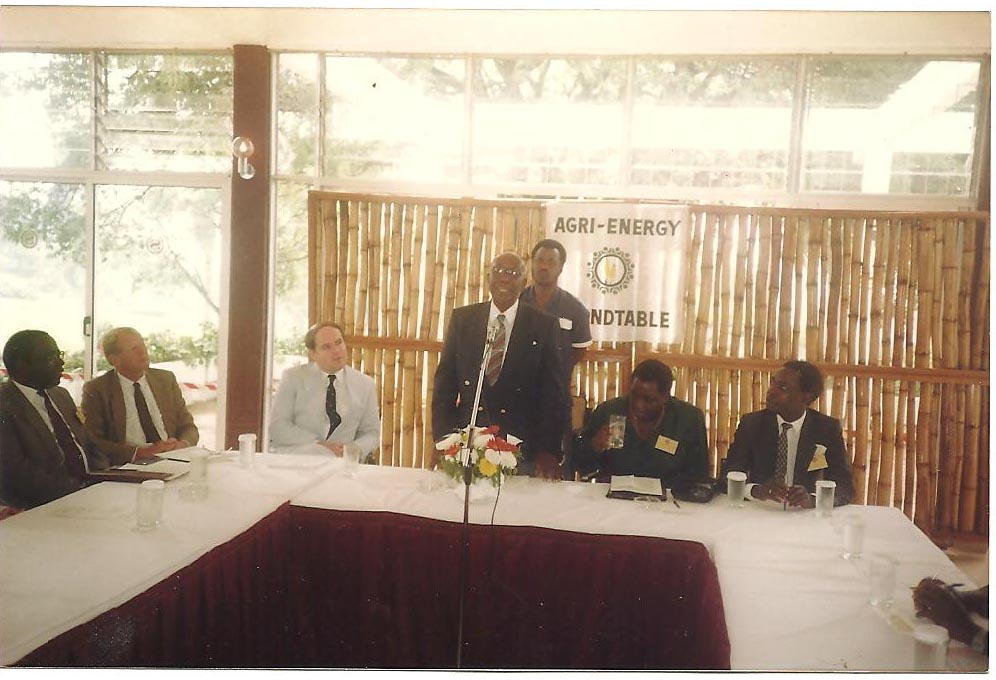
Uganda vice president Dr. Kisekka open AERUganda conference at Kampala Sheraton Hotel, November 25, 1991. Minister of Women Affairs Dr Speciosa Wandira-Kazibwe on left and Dr. Perez Bukumane AER/Uganda president-with N.E. Hollis AER on right

Despite AER's successes on the international front, leadership transition issues and interference directed at its US affiliate- the Agribusiness Council (ABC)- traced to rival domestic agricultural interests- created sufficient doubt to enable opponents in AID to terminate a number of key grant contracts in mid-1992 (after reinstating ABC/AER following some initial confusion in early 1990). Congressional supporters of ABC/AER forced an inquiry which resulted in the abrupt termination/redirection of several AID/USDA careers, but after the smoke cleared several years later, AER watched its contract support dry up. The effect of this truncation left numerous AER organizational efforts and potentially supportive USAID missions in the lurch.

AER's track record for assisting in the creation of agricultural associations, themselves seen as key barometers of societal health, seemed to demand more official support. Thus the government's posture became particularly troubling. For example, AER's visit to Moscow and the conduct of a workshop with interested Soviet Republics in September 1990, triggered a series of requests from Georgia SSR, Lithuania, Ukraine. Without timely government support for follow-up training and visits these feelers were allowed to wither.

== The Poland Agribusiness Association Project (1990-1995) ==
Notable exceptions to the AID political decision to cut support for AER – and ABC- came with program successes in Jamaica, Poland and later, Sri Lanka where independent counterpart associations modeled after AER emerged in the nineties following Hollis visits. The most dramatic breakthrough project occurred in late 1994 in Poland, where Hollis and an ABC team traveled and campaigned around the country in some fifteen towns and cities which led to a formation conference for the Polish Agribusiness Association in March 1995 at the Forum Hotel in Warsaw. This success capped a five-year effort beginning with an AER mission to Warsaw in March 1990. The USAID mission in Poland provided low-key logistical support, but no funding for the newly established Polish association.

Eventually PAA turned to Europe's funding agency for agriculture (FAPA) for support. For its part, USDA coordinated an aggressive effort –both from Washington and Warsaw, to undercut the Polish program, and later utilized the threat of withholding agricultural support services to the US Embassy in Vilnius in a separate campaign to suffocate interest in an initiative aimed at forming an agribusiness association in Lithuania (2002).

== Developments ==
USG agencies, including USAID, USDA and the Department of State, also continued to request ABC proposals for planned agribusiness association development, formatted around the AER model, particularly in Indonesia, Ukraine, Lithuania, Azerbaijan, and Bulgaria, but these government initiatives were not sustained. More recently, US government proxy groups have sought to enlist ABC for training and/or briefings for incoming agricultural groups many of which apparently have requested ABC involvement in their visit planning (e.g., Azerbaijan (Ganja) Agribusiness Association- March 2003, Albania Agribusiness Council-October 2003, Georgian Agribusiness Association Workshop- January 2015, Eurasian Agribusiness Association Seminar- March 2015). Despite periodic letters from leading US Senators to top AID administrators encouraging a resumption of AER support, especially in Africa, AID management have sidestepped all requests.

AER continues to function as a clearinghouse for ag/energy information dissemination and provides support for the affiliated counterpart network. AER has relied on private support for almost twenty years. Memoranda and reports are circulated following important events with agricultural significance such as the 2008 collapse of the World Trade Organization (WTO) Doha Round talks due to intransigence surrounding ethanol and agricultural subsidies. AER also monitors UN FAO activities in pursuing the action plan agreed at the 1996 World Food Security Summit in Rome-(AER attended and spoke before the non-governmental organization conference linked with the Summit).
