= Propaganda film =

Movie genre

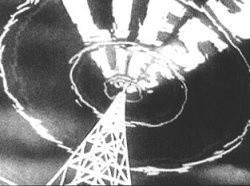
The Why We Fight series depicts the Nazi propaganda machine.

A propaganda film is a film that involves some form of propaganda. Propaganda films spread and promote causes, factual or realistic or not, that may be religious, political, or cultural in nature. A propaganda film is made with the intent that the viewer will adopt the position promoted by the propagator and eventually take action towards making those ideas widely accepted. Propaganda films are popular mediums of propaganda due to their ability to easily reach a large audience in a short amount of time. They are also able to come in a variety of film types, such as documentary, non-fiction, and newsreel, making it even easier to provide subjective content that may be deliberately misleading.

Propaganda is the ability "to produce and spread fertile messages that, once sown, will germinate in large human cultures." However, in the 20th century, a "new" propaganda emerged, which revolved around political organizations and their need to communicate messages that would "sway relevant groups of people in order to accommodate their agendas." First developed by the Lumiere brothers in 1896, film provided a unique means of accessing large audiences at once. Film was the first universal mass medium in that it could simultaneously influence viewers as individuals and members of a crowd, which led to it quickly becoming a tool for governments and non-state organizations to project a desired ideological message. As Nancy Snow stated in her book, Information War: American Propaganda, Free Speech and Opinion Control Since 9-11, propaganda "begins where critical thinking ends."

== Tools used in propaganda film ==
Film is a unique medium that reproduces images, movement, and sound in a lifelike manner as it fuses meaning with evolvement as time passes in the story depicted. Unlike many other art forms, film produces a sense of immediacy. Film's ability to create the illusion of life and reality allows for it to be used as a medium to present alternative ideas or realities, making it easy for the viewer to perceive this as an accurate depiction of life.

Some film academics have noted film's illusory abilities. Dziga Vertov claimed in his 1924 manifesto, "The Birth of Kino-Eye," that "the cinema-eye is cinema-truth." To paraphrase Hilmar Hoffmann, this means that in film, only what the camera 'sees' exists, and the viewer, lacking alternative perspectives, conventionally takes the image as reality.

=== Rhetoric ===
A common rhetorical tool used in propaganda films is making the viewer sympathize with characters that align with the filmmaker's agenda or message. Propaganda films exhibit this by having reoccurring themes of good vs. evil. The viewer is meant to feel sympathy for the "good side" while loathing the "evil side." Former German Nazi propaganda minister Joseph Goebbels used this tactic to invoke deep emotions in the audience. Goebbels stressed that while making films full of nationalistic symbols can energize a population, nothing will work better to mobilize a population towards the Nazi cause like "intensifying life".

==== The Kuleshov Effect ====
After the 1917 October Revolution, the newly formed Bolshevik government and its leader, Vladimir Lenin, placed an emphasis on the need for film as a propaganda tool. Lenin viewed propaganda merely as a way to educate the masses as opposed to a way to evoke emotion and rally the masses towards a political cause. Film became the preferred medium of propaganda in the newly formed Russian Soviet Republic due to a large portion of the peasant population being illiterate. The Kuleshov Effect was first used in 1919 in the film The Exposure of the Relics of Sergius of Radonezh by juxtaposing images of the exhumed coffin and body of Sergius of Radonezh, a prominent Russian saint, and the reaction from the watching audience. The images of the crowd are made up of mostly female faces, whose expressions can be interpreted ambiguously. The idea behind juxtaposing these images was to subvert the audience's assumption that the crowd would show emotions like sadness or upset. Instead, the crowd could be interpreted to be expressing emotions of boredom, fear, dismay, and a myriad of other emotions. There is nothing to prove to the audience that the images of the audience and the exhumed body were captured in the same moment or place (it is now believed the images of the crowd were filmed outdoors while the images showing the skeletal remains were captured indoors). This is what blurs the line of truth, making the Kuleshov Effect an effective tool of propaganda.

=== Republican conspiracy theories ===
Republican political commentator and filmmaker Dinesh D'Souza is notoriously known for promoting conspiracy theories against the Democratic Party in his films. He uses his own films as a propaganda tool to manipulate younger audiences, most notably Generation Z, to influence their alleged corruption.

== List of films featuring propaganda ==
=== Pre–World War I ===
- Independența României (1912)
- The Birth of a Nation (1915)

=== Great Depression ===
- Your Town: A Story of America (1940)

=== World War II ===
- Victory Through Air Power (1943)

=== Ferdinand Marcos under Martial Law ===
- Da Real Makoy (1977)
- Tadhana (1978)

=== United States under the presidencies of Donald Trump ===
- Death of a Nation: Can We Save America a Second Time? (2018)
- Absolute Proof (2020)
- Melania (2026)

== See also ==
- History of propaganda films
- Nazism and cinema
- North Korean film propaganda
