= Council for American–Soviet Trade =

The Council for American–Soviet Trade was a proposal conceived and authored by the National Association of Manufacturers (NAM)'s international economic affairs department (IEA) to regularize commercial development between US corporation leaders and Soviet industrial and state-controlled trade organizations. It became the forerunning blueprint for the eventual US-USSR Trade and Economic Council which was formally established in October 1973.

== Origins ==
The Council for American–Soviet Trade (CAST) was initially proposed in February 1973 following the highly successful US-Soviet Trade Conference organized by the NAM in Washington at the Shoreham Hotel. With over 800 delegates and a high-level Soviet delegation led by Vice Minister of Foreign Trade V.S. Alkhimov, this conference was the largest gathering of its kind. CAST was designed in response to an official protocol which emerged from President Nixon's summit with Soviet premier Leonid Breznev during the Soviet leader's visit to Washington in June 1973. NAM's East-West Task Force had hosted a luncheon for Soviet Foreign Trade Minister N.S. Patolichev at the Washington International Club on June 22 during the Summit which reinforced the prominent role of NAM in the development of a permanent organizational mechanism. Soviet leadership had been impressed by NAM's follow-up including a June 1 meeting in New York City between Nicholas E. Hollis, NAM'-IEA's vice president and members of the East–West Task Force and Soviet deputy foreign trade minister V. Smeljakov where the CAST proposal was initially presented in writing with diagrams and proposed functions, including dual secretariat offices in Moscow and New York. NAM president E.D. Kenna testified on challenges of US-Soviet trade reform, including export credit extension and repeal of the Jackson–Vanik amendment before the Joint Economic Committee of the Congress on July 17 and underscored the CAST proposal as one approach to dealing with state controlled economies (Journal of Commerce, July 19, 1973). NAM's cautionary, qualified endorsement for exploring trade openings with the USSR contrasted with Chase Manhattan Bank's David Rockefeller, who pressed for wider export credit support and broader trade liberalization with the Soviets.

== NAM mission to USSR: gamesmanship finale ==
V.S. Alkhimov subsequently extended an invitation to visit the Soviet Union to NAM President E.D. Kenna, vice president N.E. Hollis and honorary chairman Burt F. Raynes (also chairman of Rohr Industries in Chula Vista, California). This visit occurred from September 23 to October 5, 1973, and enabled NAM to participate in the inaugural meetings for the US-USSR Trade and Economic Council in Moscow October 1 and the press conference announcing its formation on October 2 at Spasso House.

After all the gamesmanship surrounding rival concepts and leadership jockeying, what finally emerged was a dual secretariat (Moscow and New York staff offices) and governing statutes which closely resembled the CAST proposal as originally outlined by NAM staff after the US–Soviet Trade Conference. The visit also included side-trips to St. Petersburg (Leningrad) on the Baltic and the Georgian SSR capital of Tbilisi – enriched with numerous cultural excursions for spouses. The Soviet Government absorbed all in-country costs for the NAM mission. Although the NAM leaders were received at the ministerial level (Patolichev) and other Kremlin officials, a farewell audience with Soviet premier Breznev scheduled for the final day – was cancelled at the last minute ostensibly due to illness. But on the evening of October 4, the lights burned late at the Kremlin – and within twenty four hours, the Egyptian and Syrian armies opened the October War against Israel
