= Jerry Jasinowski =

- Born: January 3, 1939; LaPorte, Indiana, United States
- Died: January, 22, 2025; Washington, DC
- Occupations: Business and economic adviser
- Spouse: Isabel Hyde Jasinowski
- Children: Abe, Paul and Anne Marie

Jerry J. Jasinowski (January 4, 1939 – January 22, 2025) was the President and Chief Executive Officer of the National Association of Manufacturers and Founder and Past President of the Manufacturing Institute.

== Early life and education ==
Jerry Jasinowski was born in LaPorte, Indiana. In 1962, Jasinowski graduated from Indiana University Bloomington with a BA in Economics. He served in the U.S. Air Force in the Vietnam War. Later, Jasinowski went on to graduate with an MA in Economics from Columbia University. He attended the six-week Advanced Management Program at Harvard Business School.

== Career ==
Jasinowski is the Founder and former President of the Manufacturing Institute (MI). The Manufacturing Institute, founded in 1990, is the 501(c)(3) affiliate of the National Association of Manufacturers.

Jasinowski helped raise $8 million to support new initiatives that included path-breaking research and publications, providing US companies with the knowledge and tools necessary to increase global competitiveness. He also helped to establish the Center for Workforce Success (CWS) the MI’s training and educational affiliate

Jasinowski also created and implemented the “Campaign for Growth and Manufacturing Renewal,” an awareness and communications program that led to the first US Department of Commerce Report, “Manufacturing in America." Additionally, while serving as President of the Manufacturing Institute he helped launch “Dream It, Do It” as a pilot program in Kansas City to address the manufacturing skills shortage, resulting in the local technical college experiencing a 35% increase in enrollment in manufacturing-related courses; the program’s success led to the creation of “Dream It, Do It” campaigns throughout the country. He also launched Get Tech, a Web-based, interactive program co-sponsored by the US Department of Commerce and designed to encourage young people to use technology and to see manufacturing as a technology-based industry

Jasinowski served as the President and Chief Executive Officer of the National Association of Manufacturers from 1990-2004. The Manufacturing Institute, founded in 1990, is the 501(c)(3) affiliate of the National Association of Manufacturers. While serving as President and CEO, Jasinowski achieved the launch of a small and medium-sized manufacturers initiative to ensure these sectors were fully engaged in NAM’s policies and priorities; the growth of non-dues revenue services; expanding NAM’s telemarketing capability; and the creation of a stronger field sales force.

Jasinowski transformed advocacy operations by building diverse coalitions that included the creation of a state-by-state grassroots lobbying effort, which strengthened NAM’s capacity to secure beneficial legislation for the industry at state and federal levels. He led an industry effort to secure landmark legislation affecting trade, taxes, and other issues for the manufacturing sector, including the passage of the US Trade Promotion and Authority Act (2002) and the North American Free Trade Agreement (1994).

Jasinowski is recognized as an expert on manufacturing and other economic issues. His letters have appeared in the New York Times. Jasinowski is a popular speaker and frequent guest on TV programs such as CNBC, Bloomberg and Fox Business.

Jasinowski endorsed Democratic candidate Hillary Clinton in the 2016 U.S. presidential election.

Jasinowski died on January 22, 2025.
