= Your Town: A Story of America =

1940 sponsored film

- Directed by: Robert Snody
- Produced by: Audio Productions Inc.
- Music by: Edwin E. Ludig
- Distributed by: National Association of Manufacturers
- Release date: 1940
- Running time: 11 minutes
- Country: United States
- Language: English

Your Town: A Story of America is a 1940 short sponsored film produced by Audio Productions Inc. in collaboration with the National Association of Manufacturers (NAM). The black-and-white film was created and distributed as part of NAM's nationwide public relations campaign (Note: See the La Follette Committee (1936–1941) for documentation of NAM's propaganda campaign.) to counter growing support for New Deal policies, unionization, and public acceptance of government intervention in the economy during the Great Depression. The Hagley Museum and Library classifies this type of PR as visual propaganda.

The film argues that the prosperity generated by industry is essential to preserving the American way of life, an idea that NAM used to fuse civil liberties (freedom of speech, freedom of the press, religious freedom), representative government, and free enterprise together. Your Town advanced this message by portraying industry as the foundation of a prosperous town and opposition to it as contrary to the interests of the community.

Archival copies of the film are held by the Library of Congress, the Prelinger Archives, and UCLA. The film is in the public domain.

== Synopsis ==
Your Town (1940)

The short, 11-minute film begins with patriotic American music playing over a daylight montage of three scenes in succession. First, a 48-star American flag is shown waving in the breeze. It then cuts to a shot of the Statue of Liberty, as seen from a boat moving close to the shore of Liberty Island in New York Harbor. Over scenes of the United States Capitol, the Lincoln Memorial, the Empire State Building, and scenes of a factory and a seaport, an opening text crawl describes progress as a fusion of representative democracy and private enterprise, declaring that the freedom and high standard of living in the United States are the envy of the world and that it is the duty of citizens to study the "American way of life" and understand its institutions so that they can be defended.

The introduction fades in back to the flag, which is now shown to have been flying over a town hall in a small town with hundreds of homes on a flat, tree-covered plain somwhere in middle America. The house of Mr. Robinson appears as police officer Mike rolls up with Jerry, Mr. Robinson's young grandson, bringing him home to his grandfather. Mike explains that he found Jerry in the middle of a workers' protest at the local factory owned by old man Manson and took Jerry into custody for his own protection after a fight broke out. Jerry questions the importance of Manson given the protest, but Mr. Robinson explains to Jerry that Manson's factory is the most important part of their town.

They leave their home and stroll past the stores in town, where people are busy engaged in commerce. Mr. Robinson begins to tell Jerry the "truth" about the Manson factory, contrary to what Jerry heard at the protest. He explains that the factory simply represents "your town." Curious to hear more, they sit down on the steps of a building, and Mr. Robinson begins his story from the beginning, recalling the time when he was young and the town was still new.

The story then flashes back to their town many decades in the past, when it had only one street and a few farms that grew crops, but no businesses and few customers. Manson arrived in their town and changed all that, Mr. Robinson explains. Manson had a dream of building a factory, and with outside investment, the dream was realized in their own town. Over the years, the factory employed local townspeople and continued to grow and expand, bringing new people to the town and causing the town itself to grow. Families came to the town, new homes were built, and new stores began to open.

Mr. Robinson tells Jerry that the factory was responsible for all of this and, even more, that Jerry's own existence was due in part to the factory. The hospital where he was born was built because of the factory. The professionals who came to serve the factory workers, such as doctors, lawyers, and dentists, also came to the town because of the factory. Mr. Robinson describes how the factory's success led to the success of the town, with wages rising and working hours growing shorter, giving people more leisure time. He then explains how the factory contributes to other parts of the town's economy, including advertisers and newspapers, while its payroll taxes pay for public services such as schools, police, and fire departments. Even the farmers benefit as the factory finds new uses for their products.

Jerry's grandfather closes by explaining that, because of everything the factory does for their town, opposing the factory would be like working against their own best interests. "The story of your town," he tells Jerry, "is the story of America."

== Background ==
The National Association of Manufacturers (NAM) developed a national public relations campaign in the 1930s in response to the New Deal and the growing power of organized labor. The expansion of federal regulation, the National Industrial Recovery Act, new protections for labor organizing, and proposals concerning wages, working hours, and child labor challenged the traditional authority of employers over industrial relations. The Wagner Act of 1935 strengthened workers' rights to organize and bargain collectively, while the growth of industrial unions intensified the conflict. NAM regarded these developments, along with growing public acceptance of government responsibility for regulating the economy, as threats to private enterprise.

Beginning in 1936, NAM expanded its campaign to shape public opinion, using newspapers, radio, billboards, pamphlets, advertising, and motion pictures. Its film program included titles such as Men and Machines and Let's Go America! (both 1936), with these films distributed through theaters, schools, and other venues, often for free. The campaign came under scrutiny during the La Follette Committee's investigation of labor rights and free speech in 1939, with their report documenting NAM's efforts to influence workers and public opinion.

As the campaign continued, NAM's message evolved from opposition to particular New Deal measures into a broader defense of the American economic system. By 1937, the association was formulating the proposition that free enterprise and democracy were inseparable, arguing that private enterprise was fundamental to the preservation of American liberty. Its public relations materials increasingly linked industrial production and employment to prosperity, individual opportunity, and the American way of life. NAM spent $793,000 ($17.8 million in 2025) on these efforts in that same year alone.

By 1939, NAM's "Declaration of Principles" described constitutional representative democracy, free enterprise, and civil and religious liberty as "inseparable fundamentals of freedom." In 1940, NAM gave this argument a formulation known as the "Tripod of Freedom", presenting representative democracy, civil and religious liberty, and free private enterprise as interdependent foundations of American freedom. NAM's campaign, which initially began by opposing New Deal regulation and organized labor, now grew from a national communications apparatus to a public relations strategy which presented private enterprise as an essential component of America.

== Analysis ==
In the early 20th century, NAM originally referred to their campaign that produced films like Your Town in the context of public relations, but the Hagley Museum and Library, which began hosting NAM's archival records in the early 1970s, now refers to this kind of public relations as visual propaganda.

American writer and historian Stewart Ewen notes how the film draws upon older notions of Victorian morality in terms of the family. In the film, it is the grandfather, the patriarch, who defends the values of conservatism to his young grandson. Ewen describes the family in Your Town as a sanctuary from the real world that defends "Corporate America", with the parallel being drawn between the "paternally benevelent" company and the grandfather who fights to preserve their community under its guidance.

== See also ==
- American Family Robinson – Anti-New Deal propaganda program in the United States (1930s)
- Industry on Parade

== Sources ==
=== Archival collections ===
- Gray, David (22 September 2014). "The National Association of Manufacturers and Visual Propaganda". Hagley Museum and Library.

=== Books ===
- Ewen, Stuart (1996). PR! A Social History of Spin. Basic Books. ISBN 9780465061686. OCLC 34149757.
- Fones-Wolf, Elizabeth A. (1994). Selling Free Enterprise: The Business Assault on Labor and Liberalism, 1945–60. University of Illinois Press. ISBN 9780252064395. OCLC 30110129.
- Oreskes, Naomi; Conway, Erik M.; Tyson, Charlie (2020). "How American Businessmen Made Us Believe that Free Enterprise was Indivisible from American Democracy: The National Association of Manufacturers' Propaganda Campaign 1935–1940". In Bennett, W. Lance; Livingston, Steven (eds.). The Disinformation Age. Anxieties of Democracy. Cambridge: Cambridge University Press. pp. 95–119.Full access available to users of The Wikipedia Library.
- Phillips-Fein, Kim (2010). Invisible Hands: The Businessmen's Crusade Against the New Deal. W.W. Norton. ISBN 9780393077636. OCLC 915997248.
- Prelinger, Rick (2006). The Field Guide to Sponsored Films. National Film Preservation Foundation. ISBN 9780974709932. OCLC 655167840.

=== Journals ===
- Anderson, Bill (2025). "The National Association of Manufacturers World War II campaign: A historical case study on power, ideology, and discourse". Public Relations Review. 51 (2). doi:10.1016/j.pubrev.2025.102560. ISSN 0363-8111.
- Levin, B. (2012). "Made in the U.S.A.: Corporate Responsibility and Collective Identity in the American Automotive Industry". Boston College Law Review. 53 (3). Boston College: 821–875. ISSN 0161-6587.
- Oreskes, Naomi; Conway, Eirk M. (Fall 2022). "From Anti-Government to Anti-Science: Why Conservatives Have Turned Against Science". Daedalus. 151 (4): 98–123. doi:10.1162/daed_a_01946. ISSN 0011-5266.
- Oreskes, Naomi; Conway, Erik M. (2023). The Big Myth: How American Business Taught Us to Loathe Government and Love the Free Market. Bloomsbury Publishing. ISBN 9781635573589. OCLC 1370495637.
- St. John III, Burton; Arnett, Robert (March 2014). "The National Association of Manufacturers' Community Relations Short Film Your Town: Parable, Propaganda, and Big Individualism". Journal of Public Relations Research. 26 (2). Routledge: 103–116. doi:10.1080/1062726X.2013.795868. ISSN 1062-726X.Full access available to users of The Wikipedia Library.
- Tedlow, Richard S. (Spring 1976). "The National Association of Manufacturers and Public Relations during the New Deal". Business History Review. 50 (1). Cambridge University Press: 25–45. doi:10.2307/3113573. ISSN 2044-768X.Full access available to users of The Wikipedia Library.
- Thompson, Gareth (2016). "The Next of Kin: Propaganda, realism or a film with a purpose?". Public Relations Review. 42 (5): 812–820. doi:10.1016/j.pubrev.2016.10.003. ISSN 0363-8111.
- Quichocho, Danielle; St. John, Burton (2022). "Locating a narrative paradigm Nexus in the circuit of culture: articulating the anti-proposition 112 public relations campaign in Colorado". Journal of Public Relations Research. 34 (3/4). Taylor & Francis Ltd: 135–151. doi:10.1080/1062726X.2022.2088537. ISSN 1062-726X.
