= Doug Kenna =

American football player and businessman (1924–2013)

No. 36
- Position: Quarterback

Personal information
- Born: June 11, 1924; Jackson, Mississippi, U.S.
- Died: January 28, 2013 (aged 88); North Palm Beach, Florida, U.S.

Career information
- High school: Jackson, MS (Central HS)
- College: United States Military Academy

Career history
- 1941: Ole Miss
- 1942–1944: Army

Awards and highlights
- National champion (1944); First-team All-American (1944); Second-team All-Eastern (1944); Mississippi Sports Hall of Fame
- College Football Hall of Fame (Class of 1984)

Other information
- Military career
- Burial place: Lakewood Memorial Park
- Allegiance: United States
- Branch: U.S. Army
- Conflicts: Occupation of Germany

Edgar Douglas Kenna II (June 11, 1924 – January 28, 2013) was an American football player and businessman.

== Biography ==
=== College football ===
Kenna played his freshman year at the University of Mississippi for the Ole Miss Rebels. However, following his freshman year, Kenna received an appointment to the United States Military Academy at West Point where he played for Army as a sophomore, junior and senior. Coached by Earl Blaik, he was a quarterback and halfback.

In 1944, he quarterbacked West Point's undefeated national championship team. He also served as the captain of West Point's tennis and basketball teams. In 1944, the basketball team lost only one game, while the tennis team went undefeated.

=== Post-college ===
Once World War II ended, Kenna was recruited by General George S. Patton to coach Army football teams inside of occupied Germany. He also was later an assistant coach, under Earl Blaik, at West Point for a time. Serving on numerous boards, Kenna later held executive positions for several major companies, including Avco Corporation, Mississippi Power, Fuqua Industries, Robert B. Anderson Ltd., G.L. Ohrstrom & Company and Carrier Corporation. He later served as the president of the National Association of Manufacturers and became a founding director of the US-USSR Trade and Economic Council, which was based on an NAM proposal called the Council for American-Soviet Trade.

=== Death ===
Kenna died in North Palm Beach, Florida, where he had lived for years, on January 28, 2013.
