= Robert Haslam, Baron Haslam =

British industrialist, engineer and nobleman

The Right Honourable The Lord Haslam

Member of the House of Lords
- Lord Temporal
- Life peerage 13 August 1990 – 2 November 2002

Personal details
- Born: 4 February 1923
- Died: 2 November 2002 (aged 79)

Robert Haslam, Baron Haslam (4 February 1923 in Bolton, Lancashire – 2 November 2002 in Virginia Water, Surrey), was a British industrialist and chairman of British Steel Corporation and British Coal. He was created a Life Peer in 1990.

== Education ==
Haslam was educated at Bolton School and Birmingham University where he gained a first-class degree in mining engineering.

== Career ==
In 1944 was recruited by Manchester Collieries as a trainee, starting as a pit boy and working underground for three years, including eighteen months at the coalface, in a number of Lancashire collieries. He obtained his colliery manager's certificate in June 1947, six months after the coal industry was nationalised.

In October 1947 he joined the technical service department of the Nobel division of Imperial Chemical Industries in Glasgow and spent ten years there. During this time he rose to staff manager of a team of mining engineers and explosive experts working in mines around the world.

In Egypt he blew up the cofferdam to enable building of the Aswan Dam. He also advised on the production of the film The Bridge on the River Kwai on construction and blowing-up of the bridge.

In 1960 he became personnel director of the Nobel division and in 1963 commercial director of the plastics division. He became deputy chairman in 1966 and chairman of the fibres division in 1969. In 1974 he became a member of ICI's main board.

In 1983 John Harvey-Jones became chairman and Haslam left ICI to become chairman of Tate and Lyle. He took over the chairmanship of state-run British Steel Corporation from Ian MacGregor. In 1986 he replaced MacGregor at British Coal which was then in terminal decline.

Having been knighted in 1985, Haslam retired in 1990 and was created a life peer taking the title Baron Haslam, of Bolton in the County of Greater Manchester.

== Personal life ==
He married, first, on 5 June 1947, Joyce Quin (d.1995), a clerk from Bolton on 5 June 1947. They had two sons, Roger (b. 1948) and Nigel (b. 1952). He married, second, on 20 July 1996, Elizabeth Sieff widow of Michael Sieff (d. 1987) former joint Managing Director of Marks & Spencer.

Political offices
Preceded by Ian MacGregor	Chairman of British Coal; 1986–1990	Succeeded by Neil Clarke
