= Jay Timmons =

President and CEO of the National Association of Manufacturers
- Incumbent
- Assumed office 2011
- Preceded by: John Engler

Chief of Staff to the Governor of Virginia
- In office 1994–1998
- Governor: George Allen
- Preceded by: Jay Shropshire
- Succeeded by: Boyd Marcus

Personal details
- Born: Chillicothe, Ohio, U.S.
- Party: Republican
- Education: Ohio State University
- Occupation: Lobbyist; Association executive

Jay Timmons is an American lobbyist and government official. Since 2011, he has been president and CEO of the National Association of Manufacturers (NAM), the largest manufacturing trade association in the United States. Earlier in his career, Timmons was executive director of the National Republican Senatorial Committee (NRSC) and Chief of Staff to the 67th governor of Virginia George Allen.

== Early life and education ==
Timmons was born and raised in Chillicothe, Ohio, and his father and grandfather worked in manufacturing. He attended Ohio State University but dropped out after his junior year to run for a seat in the Ohio House of Representatives. After losing that election, he moved Washington, D.C., to work in the "Reagan revolution."

== Political and government career ==
Timmons began his career in Washington, D.C., working as a staff member for the House Republican Research Committee in the late 1980s. He went on to serve as a press secretary for U.S. Representatives Jim Martin and Alex McMillan of North Carolina. In 1993, Timmons managed George Allen’s successful campaign for Governor of Virginia. Following the election, he was appointed Chief of Staff to Governor Allen (1994–1998), overseeing economic and legislative policy in Virginia. Timmons later led Allen’s 2000 U.S. Senate campaign, helping secure a Republican victory. From 2002 to 2004, he served as Executive Director of the National Republican Senatorial Committee (NRSC), playing a key role in the 2004 midterm elections, in which Republicans gained four additional Senate seats.

== National Association of Manufacturers ==
Timmons joined the NAM in 2005 as Senior Vice President for Policy and Government Relations. He was later promoted to Executive Vice President, overseeing the NAM’s government affairs, policy advocacy, and communications. In 2011, Timmons was appointed President and CEO of the NAM, succeeding former Michigan Governor John Engler. Timmons also assumed the role of Chairman of the Board of the Manufacturing Institute – the NAM’s nonprofit affiliate focused on workforce development and education for the manufacturing sector. During his presidency, he led the NAM to create the NAM Legal Center, acquire the Manufacturing Leadership Council and combine with the Innovation Research Interchange.

=== Relationship with Trump administration ===
After Donald Trump's first election as president, Timmons and the NAM were supportive of Trump's manufacturing agenda and worked closely with the White House to craft legislation on tax cuts, regulatory relief and manufacturing investment incentives. Timmons led an effort to rally over 1,100 business leaders to both congratulate and commit to working with then President-elect Trump in a letter that was delivered to Trump hours after the race was called. Timmons urged the NAM members to support the 2017 Tax Cuts and Jobs Act and applauded a Trump executive order to speed up pipeline construction. The NAM worked with its members to provide factory venues for Trump administration speeches and events.

Timmons visited the White House in March 2017 and told Trump that manufacturers felt the country had returned to the right track. "That’s because of the focus on taxes, regulations, infrastructure investment," he said, according to a transcript of the meeting. "We appreciate your commitment to investment in job creation and manufacturing." On Manufacturing Day—October 6, 2017—Timmons and others joined Trump in the Oval Office for a photo op behind the Resolute Desk.

During the Trump presidency, the NAM was divided on the issue of tariffs, which the NAM's larger members opposed and some of its smaller members supported, creating some distance between Timmons and the Trump administration. Timmons grew more distant from the administration during the COVID-19 pandemic. He opposed protests calling for reopening the economy in April 2020, commenting on Facebook that such protestors were "IDIOTS." He warned against reopening prematurely, and he promoted widespread masking, saying "It's easy, everyone can do this."

In December 2020, Timmons' 88-year-old father died of COVID-19, and Timmons said that "my dad—like thousands and thousands of other Americans—would no doubt be alive if someone else had just been a little more cautious and even done something as simple and effortless as wearing a face covering...That careless individual may have taken the virus more seriously if our national leaders had modeled appropriate behavior and done more to encourage Americans to follow those simple guidelines that would have kept our country safe."

After the 2020 presidential election was called for Joe Biden, the NAM issued a statement congratulating Biden. As the January 6 riot at the Capitol was taking place, Timmons was one of the first industry group leaders to condemn the action and call for Trump's removal. “This is chaos. It is mob rule. It is dangerous. This is sedition and should be treated as such,” Timmons said, calling on Vice President Mike Pence to "seriously consider working with the Cabinet to invoke the 25th amendment to preserve democracy.”

In a Washington Post op-ed the next day, Timmons doubled down on his statement. "We cannot trust the arsonist to pretend to be the firefighter any longer. . . . President Trump needs to be held accountable." He added:

On Wednesday, our democracy was savagely attacked by armed Trump supporters. The facts are clear. They were inspired by outright lies that a free and fair election had been stolen and “rigged.” They believed the president’s baseless claims that he somehow won an election that he overwhelmingly, indisputably lost. And, incited by the president, they attacked Congress to stop its members from certifying the electoral votes.

== Personal life ==
Timmons has been married to Rick Olson since 2008. They have been partnered since 1991. Timmons was closeted until 2004, when he was one of several Republican members of Congress and Capitol Hill staffers to be outed by Michael Rogers and John Aravosis.

=== Jacob's Law ===
Timmons and Olson are the fathers of two children born via surrogacy but who are biologically related to them. Friends donated an embryo, which was implanted in a surrogate. A judge in Wisconsin granted Timmons and Olson interim parental rights in June 2015, and the child was born via surrogacy in Wisconsin in August 2015. However, a newly appointed judge revoked their parental rights, triggering a legal battle over their adoptive son. After the judge resigned in 2016, a new judge reaffirmed Timmons and Olson's parental rights.

Their legal fight spurred their state delegate, Rip Sullivan, to introduce HB 1979, which replaced the terms "husband" and "wife" with "spouse" in Virginia law, allowed single people to use a gestational surrogate, clarified that only a carrier with a genetic link to the embryo can void a surrogacy contract, and eliminated the need for an adoption process after birth via surrogacy.

HB 1979 became known as "Jacob's Law" after Timmons and Olson's son. With advocacy by Timmons and Allen, the bill passed the Republican-controlled Virginia legislature in 2019. Governor Ralph Northam signed it into law in June 2019.
