= Export Expansion Finance Act of 1971 =

With the enactment of the United States Export Expansion Finance Act of 1971, the discount loan facility of the Export-Import Bank (Eximbank) was expanded, along with other programs that supported U.S. exports. The Act amended the earlier Export-Import Bank Act of 1945.

== Improving U.S. Exports ==
The Export Expansion Finance Act was part of the economic policy of President Richard Nixon, announced on August 15, 1971. The so-called "New Economic Policy' of the Nixon Administration promoted developing economic relation with Soviet Russia. Along with the Smithsonian Agreement, the goal was to improve U.S. exports, improve U.S. economic efficiency, competitiveness of U.S. manufacture in foreign markets and to reduce inflation.

== Eximbank ==
Under the new law $7.23 billion of loans, guarantees and insurance were authorized by Eximbank in 1972, in support of 9.5 billion in exports, a 1/3 increase over the previous year.

The legislation increased the bank's commitment authority from $13.5 billion to $20 billion.

It also effectively repealed the Fino amendment which prohibited giving Eximbank credits to Communist countries by giving discretionary powers to the office of the President. Romania and the U.S.S.R became eligible for Eximbank credits under the new discretionary powers and $11 million was authorized for Romania in 1972, and $200 million in support of exports to the Soviet Union.
