= Industry Center for Trade Negotiations =

The Industry Center for Trade Negotiations (ICTN), established in May 1975 as a non-profit, membership association with offices in Washington, D.C., United States and Geneva, Switzerland, monitored the multilateral trade negotiations, providing information and support services for U.S. industry sponsors with the purpose of supplementing industry participation in, and understanding of, the complexities of the so-called Tokyo Round until disbanding in August 1979.

== Origins ==
Initially conceived as part of an ambitious project to quantify non-tariff trade barriers (NTBs) spearheaded by the National Association of Manufacturers (NAM)’s International Economic Affairs (IEA) department led by Nicholas E. Hollis, vice president and manager, ICTN evolved from a coalition of twenty five industrial trade associations, representing such diverse sectors as the American Paper Institute, the Farm and Industrial Equipment Institute, the Computer and Business Equipment Manufacturers Association, the General Aviation Manufacturers, National Electrical Manufacturers Association and many others, which supported the NAM's study approach for NTBs. The association coalition emerged from a series of conferences organized by Hollis in 1972 under the chairmanship of Samuel E. MacArthur, chairman and chief executive of Federal-Mogul Corporation- a ball bearing manufacturing company headquartered near Detroit. The project momentum accelerated after a presentation at the Homestead before more than 100 NAM directors - many of them chief executives of major corporations. The project evolved into a formalized task force of the IEA and a separate trade association group which became known as the Inter-Association Trade Group (IATG) in 1975.

In 1974, IEA formally launched the campaign for the establishment of ICTN with the aim of forcing governmental authorities in the Nixon Administration (Office of Special Trade Representative and the Department of Commerce) to strengthen and supplement participation of US industry in the consultative preparations for the anticipated multilateral trade round. This process accelerated after Nixon's resignation when President Gerald R. Ford signed the Trade Reform Act of 1974 on January 3, 1975—legislation by which Congress authorized the Executive Branch to negotiate tariff and NTB reductions under the General Agreement on Tariffs and Trade (GATT) – a forerunner of the current World Trade Organization (WTO). NAM utilized its leadership position within the association coalition to lobby for passage of the Trade Reform Act.

After a six-month fundraising campaign which attracted more than 140 major corporations and association sponsors, ICTN was formally launched with Nicholas E. Hollis elected chief executive officer and former STR Ambassador William D. Eberle as chairman. At the time Eberle was also serving as president of the Motor Vehicle Manufacturers Association – and his nomination to ICTN's chairmanship was contested.

Disagreements between Eberle and the staff director around the vision and scope of ICTN activities developed almost from the outset.

In July, Hollis traveled to Europe, opened the Geneva office, and began the ICTN newsletter. But soon he realized the negotiations themselves were stalling due to agricultural inertia and European concern that President Ford might not be elected in the Watergate backlash the following year. The Europeans decided on a “wait-and-see” posture, effectively postponing any meaningful talks. Hollis recognized the ICTN could not maintain momentum and its budget commitments in such an environment and returned stateside after arranging for a freelance journalist, accredited before the Palais des Nations (United Nations) for press briefings to forward reports to ICTN subscribers.

ICTN continued to provide reports on a quarterly basis until the summer of 1979 with the completion of the Tokyo Round. ICTN did not realize some of its earlier representational dreams, but it proved unique as the first industry-wide coalition of its kind to focus attention on the MTN process- and the need for greater US industry participation in global commercial development.

== Sources ==
- Washington Post, “Japan Seen Relatively Insulated From Effects of Yen Revaluation”, Hobart Rowen, August 17, 1972, D14.
- Journal of Commerce, “US Trade Talks Clouded” Robert Morison, November 13, 1972,
- Journal of Commerce, “Program to List Non-tariff Barriers Aided by Fact-finding Study:
- NAM’s Study Aids Drive to List NTBs”, Sidney Fish, March 7, 1973,
- Journal of Commerce, “Industry Asks More Say in Trade Talks” Richard Lawrence, April 25, 1975,
- Journal of Commerce, “Hearings to Gather Trade Views" Richard Lawrence, May 2, 1975.
- Letter, Frederick Dent/STR White House to US Senator Russell Long, Chairman Senate Finance, May 5, 1975,
- Purchasing Magazine, “New Era Coming in International Trade”, Ann Eggleston, July 22, 1975, pp. 54–59
- Chemical & Engineering News, “New Group to Offer News of Trade Talks” July 7, 1975
- Bureau of National Affairs (BNA Reports), “NAM Creates Industry Group to Report on Multilateral Trade Talks”, July 1, 1975, pp. 5–6
- NAM International Economic Report, Vol, II, No.6, June 30, 1975,
- Proposal for an Inter-Industry Advisory Council for Trade Negotiations (IIAC-TN), Submitted to the Inter-Association Presidents’ Meeting, April 24, 1973 (prepared by Nicholas E. Hollis, NAM)
- Letter, David C. Scott, Chairman Allis-Chalmers Corp to N.E.Hollis/ICTN, August 28, 1975,
- Letter, Malcolm R. Lovell, chairman, IATG to N.E.Hollis/ICTN, September 22, 1975,
- Proposal: The Relationship of IIAC-TN to other Advisory Bodies, NAM/IEA (1974)
- Industry Center for Trade Negotiations (ICTN): A Proposal for Better Industry-Government Liaison During Multilateral Trade Negotiations,(Published 1975)
- Letter, W.D. Eberle, Office of the Special Trade Representative (STR) The White House To E. Douglas Kenna, president NAM, January 31, 1975,
- Letter, Thomas B. Curtis, Esq, to Nicholas E. Hollis, NAM, February 11, 1975,
- Letter, W. Michael Blumenthal, chairman, Bendix Corporation to Nicholas E. Hollis, June 5, 1975,
- Letters, Frank Boas, Esq. to A. R. Marusi, chairman, Borden Inc. June 4, 1975, and Nicholas E. Hollis, NAM, July 1, 1975
