= Victoria Sekitoleko =

Ugandan politician

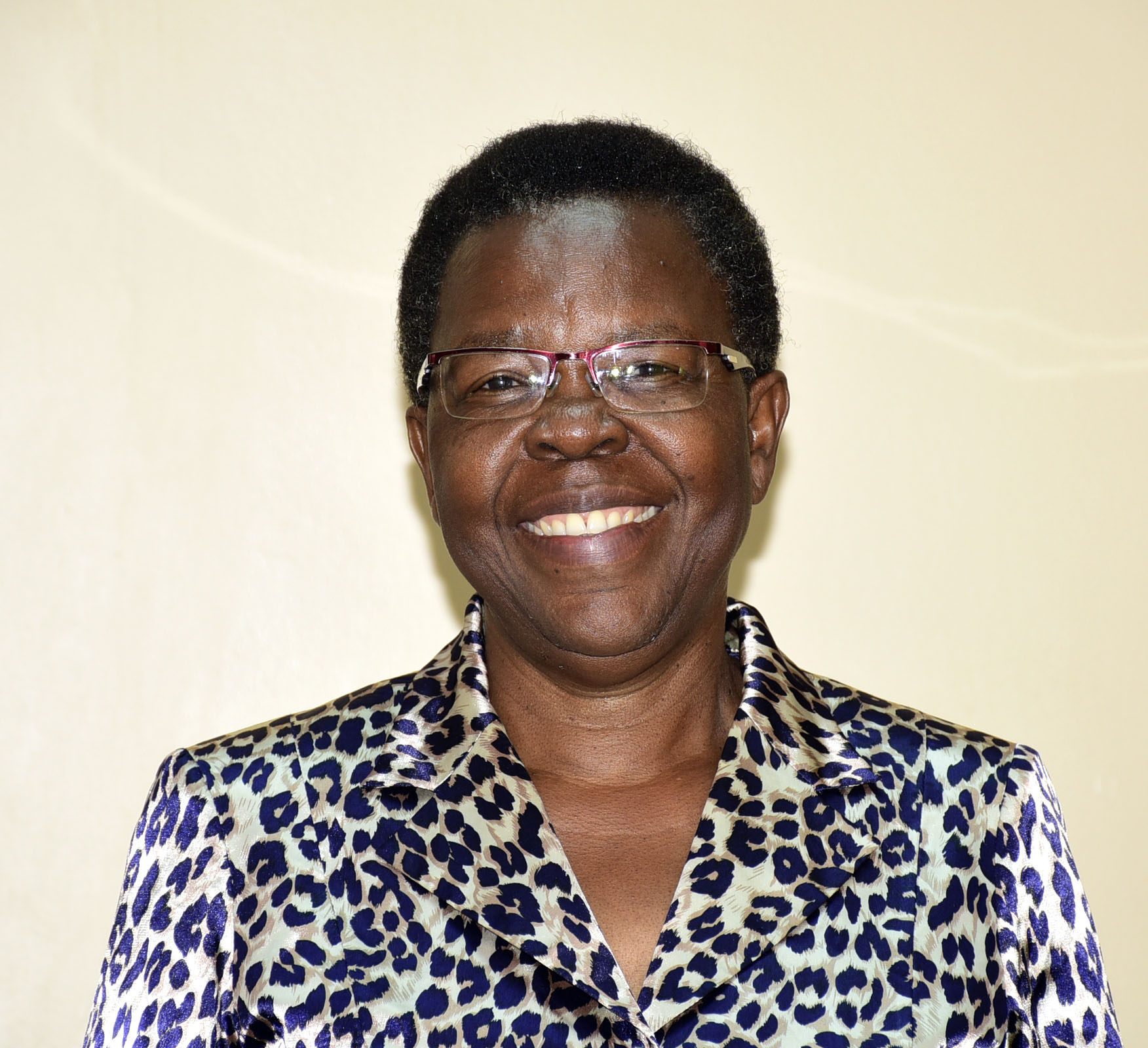

Founder:Speakers Forum & Community Cultural Center, Uganda
- In office 2011 – To date

Representative of the UN FAO
- In office 2005–2011

Ugandan Minister of Agriculture
- In office 1986–1995

Personal details
- Education: Makerere University
- Portfolio: Woman activist, Retired politician, Retired Diplomat
- Website: underconstruction

Victoria Sekitoleko is a former Minister of Agriculture in the Ugandan government, a post she held from 1986 to 1995. She was a representative for the United Nations Food and Agriculture Organization (FAO) in China, Mongolia, and South Korea (October 2006 – April 2011) She previously served as the FAO's representative in Ethiopia to the African Union (AU), and to the Economic Community for Africa (ECA) (2005–2006). She was FAO Sub Regional Representative to Eastern and Southern Africa, based at Harare, Zimbabwe.(1995–2004). Recently appointed to the Biyinzika Poultry International Limited (BPIL) Board in June 2017.

Sekitoleko was educated at Makerere University in Kampala, where she attained a BSc in Agriculture majoring in Farm Management and Extension (1970–1973). In 1983, she attended the Eastern and Southern Africa Management Institute (ESAMI) where she obtained a Certificate in Agriculture Project Identification, Appraisal and Management. In 2003 she attended the Zimbabwe Institute of Systemic Counseling, obtaining a Certificate in Systemic Counselling. In 2004, she attended the Limpopo University in South Africa (in conjunction with University of southern Hampshire, USA) where she obtained a Certificate in Micro Enterprise and Development.

In Parliament Sekitoleko was a member of the National Resistance Council (NRC).

Sekitoleko is currently chairperson of the governing board of Uganda Agribusiness Alliance. The purpose of the Uganda Agribusiness Business Alliance is to unite all those involved in the industry to best optimize their ability to profitably and sustainably pursue the many global opportunities that present themselves as part of competing in the world's largest industry.

Sekitoleko joined the Business and Professional Women Kampala (BWP) in 2013. She also joined Uganda Women Entrepreneurs Association Limited (UWEAL) in the same year.

In 2010 Victoria Sekitoleko founded the Uganda Community Cultural Center which trades as Speakers Forum. Under the Speakers Forum, she does Public Speaking and Community libraries. The offices are found at Victoria House in Bukoto opposite Kadic Hospital. She founded the forum to provide a platform for professionals to become world class presenters. To date, she spends most of her time at the Speakers Forum where she directs the training of her clientele in public speaking. She provides for them a platform to practice and participate in debates and discussions. At the speakers forum, people of all walks of life gather every end of month to share ideas and discuss issues that affect their lives.

During her time as a diplomat in China, Sekitoleko became inspired by the Chinese culture, loved to travel and always maintained a travelogue.

Through the Speakers Forum, Sekitoleko also established and supports community libraries, offering a wide selection of books to empower young people with quality information to improve their reading culture. Such libraries include the one at Bukoto, a suburb in Kampala.

This Bukoto library also provides comprehensive information about Chinese culture and Uganda culture. Others are at Budondo Headquarters, Namulesa trading center, Wanyange, and also facilitated the library at Life Skills Center, Bugembe where high school students go for training during Holidays. The former diplomat has helped the launching of many other libraries for example at Uphill Nursery and Primary School in Bugobya in Jinja district, Namaganga, Kigalagala community libraries in Busede subcounty, Jinja, Bugodi in Mayuge District, Kasambira in Kamuli District, Nkondo, Buyende district, and Bubaale Primary School, Kamuli District.

Sekitoleko continues to work for the community as she believes that giving back to the community is part and parcel of Development. In 2012, Sekitoleko became a Rotarian. She is the Charter President of Rotary Club of Kampala-Impala.

She resides in Ntinda at her retirement home. Her main mission is: To enhance Social, Economic Development of the poor through empowering them to take charge of their destiny.

In 1994, Victoria Sekitoleko delivered the keynote address at the Ugandan North American Association (UNAA) convention in Los Angeles, California.
