= Ian MacGregor =

Scottish-American industrialist and metallurgist

Sir Ian MacGregor KBE
- Born: Ian Kinloch MacGregor; 21 September 1912; Kinlochleven, Scotland
- Died: 13 April 1998 (aged 85); Taunton, Somerset, England
- Occupations: Metallurgist and industrialist
- Spouse: Sybil Spencer (m. 1942; died 1996)
- Children: 2

Sir Ian Kinloch MacGregor, KBE (21 September 1912 – 13 April 1998) was a Scottish metallurgist and industrialist. He worked in the United States from World War II until the early 1970s. He became a naturalised American after World War II, but retained his British citizenship. He is most famous in the UK for his controversial tenure at the British Steel Corporation and his conduct during the 1984–85 miners' strike while managing the National Coal Board.

== Early life ==
MacGregor was born in Kinlochleven, Scotland. His parents were Daniel MacGregor, an accountant at the British Aluminium plant, and his wife Grace Alexanderina, née Fraser Maclean, a schoolteacher. MacGregor's parents were members of the Calvinist United Free Church and he received a devoutly Christian upbringing. During the General Strike of 1926, his elder brothers drove trams in Glasgow to help break the strike. He attended George Watson's College, Edinburgh and Hillhead High School, Glasgow. At the University of Glasgow, MacGregor studied metallurgy and engineering with some distinction, receiving a first-class degree. He then earned a diploma with distinction at the Royal College of Science and Technology.

MacGregor started work as a metallurgist in 1935, alongside his father in the Kinlochleven aluminium plant but he was soon recruited as a junior manager at William Beardmore and Company's Parkhead Forge to work on vehicle armour. There, he faced an early confrontation with trade union leader David Kirkwood in a strike involving crane-drivers. MacGregor's handling of the matter, involving driving cranes himself for two weeks, brought him to the attention of chairman Sir James Lithgow, who marked him out for rapid promotion.

At the start of World War II in 1939, MacGregor went to work for the Ministry of Supply on the development of tanks. Minister of Aircraft Production Lord Beaverbrook was the next to spot his talent and commandeered him to travel to Canada and the US on procurement missions for aviation armour. He was then seconded to the British military mission in the US where he started to become familiar with US industry, including work on the development of the Sherman tank.

== Post-war life ==
At the end of the war in 1945, MacGregor remained in the US, attracted to its culture and disdainful of the newly elected British Labour government with its programme of nationalisation. In later life he observed:

I don't like unnecessary class distinctions. The Americans waste no time on them. They don't care who your father was. If you make it to the top and it comes out that your father made moonshine in Tennessee they admire you even more. Now, I like that system.

On one occasion, when a proposed takeover of a Connecticut firm fomented strike action, MacGregor was reputedly threatened by the Mafia and had his car overturned by pickets while he was inside. His takeover went ahead.

He became chief executive of American Metal Climax in 1966, diversifying the company into mining. He developed a reputation for shrewd, no-nonsense negotiation in various strands of American business, and an uncompromising attitude towards trade unions accompanied by something of an appetite for confrontation. His method was to "always get your ducks lined up," and he often referred to his "Department of Economic Warfare". During the British miners' strike he nostalgically observed:

I never thought the day would come when I wished I had some of my scruffy, sometimes ill-disciplined, sometimes loud-mouthed American police by my side in this country, and some of the curious ways of the law to back them up.

In later life he explained:

Management is a calling and people ought to be dedicated to it. British managers have far too much security. A poor manager should be dumped. What's at stake is the happiness of society, not the comfort of managers.

He went on to become a director of Lazard and chairman of the International Chamber of Commerce.

== Return to the UK ==
During his chairmanship at American Metal Climax, in 1971–72 MacGregor helped lead a high-level US–EEC Businessmen's Conference at Versailles. MacGregor served on the Steering Committee, and delivered a speech which reassured Europeans on American commitment for trade expansion. This was during heightened concerns following the Nixon Administration's decoupling of the dollar's linkage with gold and the threat of union-backed legislation (the Burke-Hartke Bill) with protectionist quotas and investment curbs.

=== British Leyland ===
He was brought back to British industry by Labour Party prime minister James Callaghan in 1977 as a non-executive director of the ailing nationalised car manufacturer British Leyland. The intention was that he would act as deputy to chairman Sir Michael Edwardes but MacGregor was not content to operate in a purely strategic role and always maintained that it was he, and not Edwardes, who had taken the pivotal step of dismissing trade unionist Derek Robinson. Other accounts differ.

=== British Steel ===
In 1979, the Conservative government of Margaret Thatcher came to power and embarked, at first tentatively, on the radical programme of industrial restructuring that would come to be known as Thatcherism. Secretary of State for Industry Sir Keith Joseph recognised MacGregor as an instinctive supporter and potential implementer of the programme. Joseph appointed MacGregor chairman of the nationalised British Steel Corporation in 1980, the British government paying Lazard's a £1.8 million settlement. Such a use of government funds, coupled with MacGregor's lack of reputation in Britain led to an outcry in the House of Commons.

His tenure at British Steel was controversial. On his appointment, British Steel employed 166,000 staff and produced 14 million tons of steel annually at a loss of £1.8 billion. MacGregor was remorseless in his programme of plant closures and redundancies. A few of the redundancies were voluntary but were made against a background of mounting unemployment in the UK and damaged many traditional steel-working communities. By 1983, there were only 71,000 staff with losses stemmed to £256 million. The company was now moving towards profitability and would be in the vanguard of the Thatcher government's programme of privatisation.

=== National Coal Board ===
His next role was as head of the National Coal Board (NCB), approved in person by Thatcher. The appointment, announced on 28 March 1983, was greeted with considerable disdain by the National Union of Mineworkers, in particular its president Arthur Scargill. Scargill was concerned at MacGregor's uncompromising business methods, branding MacGregor "the American butcher of British industry." MacGregor replied that he was "a plastic surgeon" whose job was to "try to rebuild damaged features." There was also criticism that at the age of 70 MacGregor was too old for the scale of the task.

MacGregor's approach to turning the NCB into a profitable concern was similar to the line he had taken at British Steel: cut jobs and close unprofitable pits. This led to the protracted and increasingly bitter 1984–1985 miner's strike. Despite many meetings between the two opposing sides no agreement was ever reached, and the UK coal industry continued its decline when the strike finished. As of 2013, there were three deep coal mines operating in the UK; by the end of 2015 they had all gone with the closure of Kellingley, the UK's last deep colliery.

== Later life ==
MacGregor retired from the NCB in 1986, rejoining Lazard's as a non-executive director. In the UK, there were campaigns to appoint him as head of the National Health Service and to the board of directors of British Gas plc but without success. He enjoyed a variety of company chairmanships including Goldcrest Films, but was disappointed to be forcibly retired from two US companies when he reached 78. He maintained his British business interests, observing "Being British is a faith. I will never lose it." He was chairman of property firm Mountleigh when it collapsed in 1992.

== Personality and private life ==
He married Sybil Spencer (died 1996) in Washington, D.C. in 1942; she was from Wales. They had a son and a daughter. MacGregor split his time between his homes in New York, Bermuda and Loch Fyne. MacGregor was chairman of Religion in American Life and, in the UK, the Organization for Rehabilitation through Training. He was an active campaigner against ageism in employment.

Outside the boardroom, some found him "a benign and rather avuncular man, whose Scottish burr was distinctly audible beneath the overlay of his American accent." Others saw him as "affable and stimulating: with his tongue partly in his cheek" and as "emotional and often unpredictable. He thought of himself as a creator; he returned to the UK out of a sense of patriotism as much Scots as British; and the large fees he earned were less for consumption – certainly not of any conspicuous kind – as to sustain his ceaseless world travels." Scottish miners' leader Mick McGahey described him as "viciously anti-trade union and anti-working class", claiming that he had worked "to destroy trade unionism not only in mining, but in Britain."

Margaret Thatcher herself felt that he had handled the public relations aspect of the miners' dispute poorly, failing to empathise with the British public's widespread sympathy for the miners and their communities, and the pair were on cool terms following his departure from the NCB. MacGregor's lack of presentational skills could have been a serious problem had not Arthur Scargill alienated trade union, Labour Party and public opinion by refusing to hold a national ballot.

== Death ==
MacGregor died of a heart attack, at Taunton, Somerset and was cremated.

On his death, many involved in the 1984-85 strike expressed great bitterness against him. NUM vice-president at the time, Mick McGahey said, "It's no loss to people of my ilk. MacGregor was a vicious anti-trades unionist, anti-working class person, recruited by the Tory government quite deliberately for the purpose of destroying trade unionism in the mining industry. I will not suffer any grief, nor will I in any way cry over the loss of Ian MacGregor." Former Prime Minister Margaret Thatcher said, "He brought a breath of fresh air to British industry and he had such a genial personality. He had a tremendous way of putting things. He made a real difference and I was very grateful when he came back to this country."

== Honours ==
- John Fritz Medal, (1981);
- Bessemer Gold Medal, (1983)
- Knighthood, (1986);
- Chevalier of the Legion of Honour, (1972).

== Bibliography ==
- Obituaries:
  - Daily Telegraph, 14 April 1998;
  - The Times, 14 April 1998;
  - The Independent, 15 April 1998;
  - The Scotsman, 14 April 1998;
  - The Guardian, 14 April 1998;
  - Financial Times, 14 April 1998, p.8
  - New York Times, 15 April 1998.

- Kirby, M. W. (2006) "MacGregor, Sir Ian Kinloch (1912–1998)", Oxford Dictionary of National Biography, Oxford University Press, online edn, May 2006, accessed 14 September 2007 (subscription, Wikipedia Library access or UK public library membership required)
- MacGregor, I.; Taylor, R. (1986). The Enemies Within: The Story of the Miners' Strike, 1984–5. London: Harper Collins. ISBN 0-00-217706-4.

Political offices
Preceded by Norman Siddall	Chairman of the National Coal Board; 1983–1986	Succeeded by Robert Haslam
