= Industry on Parade =

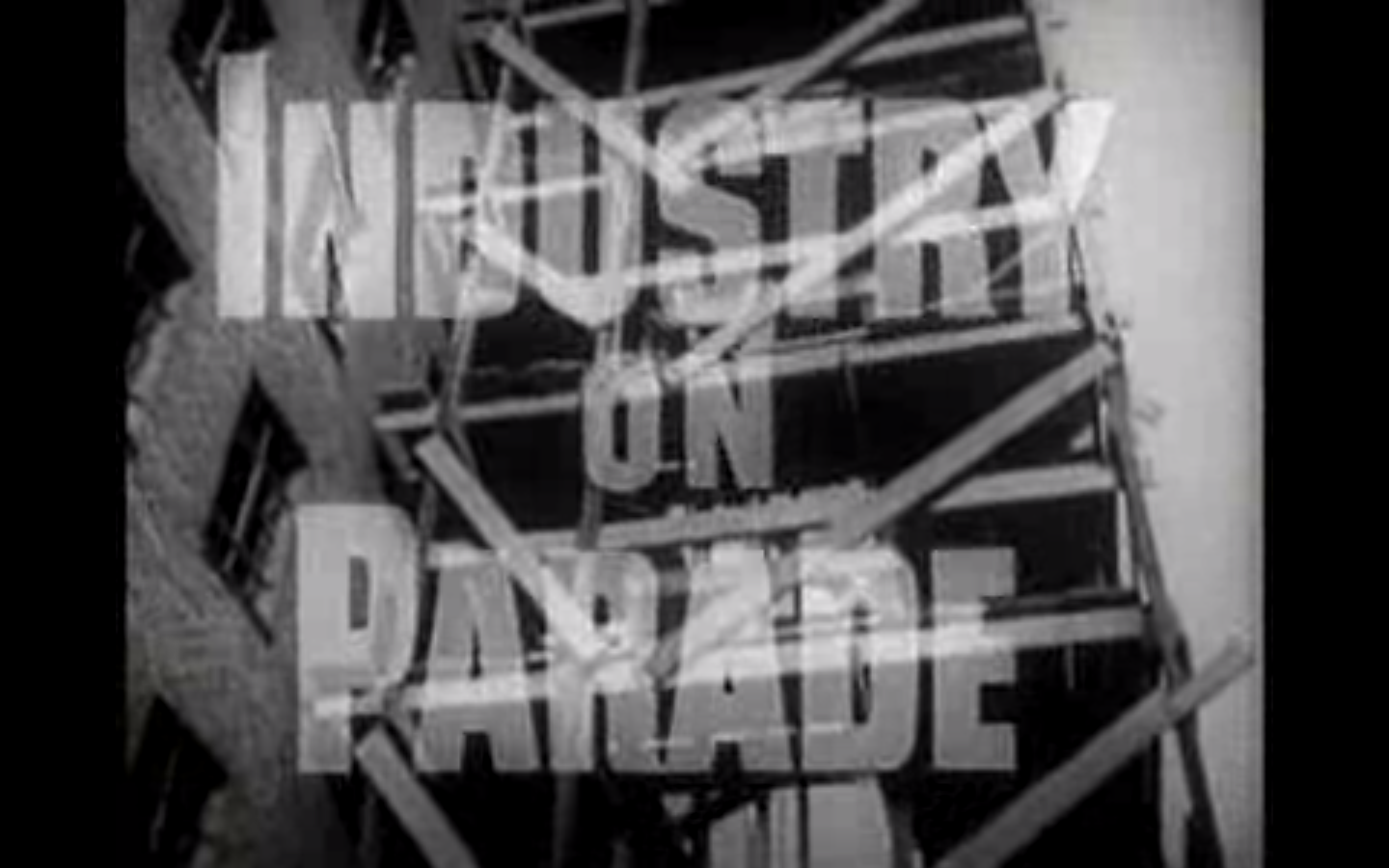
- Genre: Sponsored film
- Created by: National Association of Manufacturers
- Written by: Arthur Lodge
- Directed by: Arthur Lodge
- Presented by: Arthur Lodge
- Narrated by: Arthur Lodge
- Country of origin: United States
- Original language: English
- No. of seasons: 10
- No. of episodes: 502

Production
- Producers: National Broadcasting Company, Arthur Lodge Productions
- Cinematography: Arthur Lodge
- Running time: 13.5m

Original release
- Network: NBC

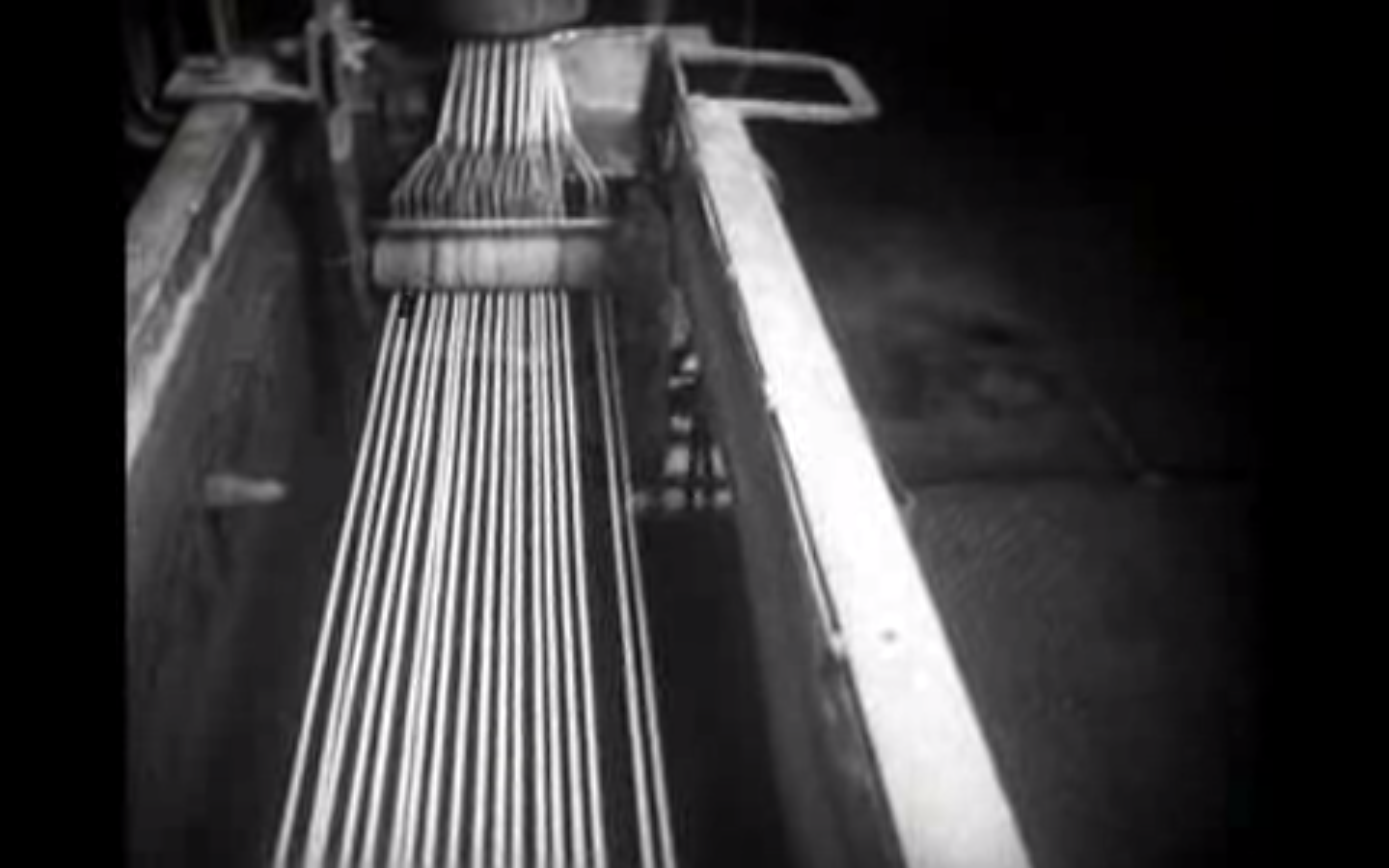
Saran is extruded into plastic thread at the National Plastic Products Company in Odenton, MD; from Industry on Parade episode "Plastic Age Anniversary!" celebrating ten years of industrial plastic production

Industry on Parade is a short television program that aired in the United States from 1950 to 1960. Produced by the National Association of Manufacturers (NAM), the show depicts complicated industrial processes that transform raw materials into finished products available for consumption by Americans. Its episodes generally contain several sections, each of which looks at a different aspect of some larger topic within industry.

The show was nationally syndicated, and local stations could show it free of charge—which they did, in a wide range of different time slots. Footage was also distributed widely among American schools and community organizations. Local reports suggest that the show was quite popular.

== History ==
The show was reportedly conceived by Johnny Johnstone, the director of television and radio at NAM. In its first year it aired on over 44 stations.

NAM collaborated with NBC in producing the show from 1950–1953. (NBC producer Arthur Lodge continued to work with the show until it ended in 1960.)

The series received a Peabody Award for National Public Service in 1954.

In 1958, the show changed formats, recycling and rearranging old footage to provide broader overviews of different industries.

In total, Industry on Parade aired more than 500 episodes over 10 years in existence. These reels were donated to the National Museum of American History in 1974, and held by the Division of Agriculture and Natural Resources until being transferred to the Archives Center in 1994.

== Themes ==
The show promotes capitalist industrial production and each episode prominently includes an anticommunist message. The success of Industry on Parade provoked the AFL–CIO to demand its own "public service" time on television, which they obtained and used to broadcast Americans at Work (1958–1961).

The show generally depicts and promotes both women in the workforce and racial integration.
