= National Association of Manufacturers =

American trade association

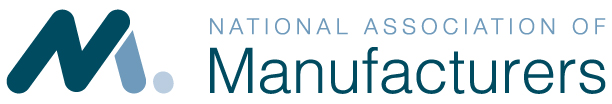
- Founded: 1895; 131 years ago
- Type: Advocacy
- Purpose: Manufacturing and Small Business Advocacy
- Location: Washington D.C.
- Region served: United States
- Key people: Jay Timmons, President & CEO
- Website: nam.org

The National Association of Manufacturers (NAM) is an advocacy group headquartered in Washington, D.C., with additional offices across the United States. It is the nation's largest manufacturing industrial trade association, representing 14,000 small and large manufacturing companies in every industrial sector and in all 50 states. Jay Timmons has led the organization as President and CEO since 2011.

A 2018 Business Insider article described the NAM as "a behemoth in the US capital, receiving unfettered access to the White House and top lawmakers on Capitol Hill". In 2018, House Ways and Means Chairman Kevin Brady commented that passage of the Tax Cuts and Jobs Act would not have happened without leadership from the National Association of Manufacturers.

== Policy issues ==
The NAM's policy issue work is focused in the areas of labor, employment, health care, energy, corporate finance, tax, bilateral trade, multilateral trade, export controls, technology, regulatory and infrastructure policy. The organization emphasizes four pillars that are supposed to make America great: free enterprise, competitiveness, individual liberty, and equal opportunity.

The NAM releases a Manufacturing Outlook Survey every quarter. As of the second quarter of 2018, according to the NAM, 95.1% of manufacturers registered a positive outlook for their company, "the highest level recorded in the survey’s 20-year history". The same survey found that manufacturers rated "the inability to attract and retain a quality workforce" as their top concern. President Donald Trump mentioned the NAM’s survey in an event at the White House in April 2018.

The NAM's Manufacturing Institute is a 501(c)3 dedicated to developing a modern manufacturing workforce to help manufacturers get skilled, qualified and productive workers to remain competitive. The Institute sponsors Manufacturing Day on the first Friday of October, a nationwide event for manufacturers to host students, parents, and policy-leaders and "address common misperceptions about manufacturing".

In 2017, the NAM launched the Manufacturers' Accountability Project (MAP), a campaign run through the Manufacturers' Center for Legal Action (MCLA) to combat frivolous, politically-motivated lawsuits against energy manufacturers. As of August 2018, three of those lawsuits have been dismissed from court.

According to the NAM, manufacturing employs nearly 12 million workers, contributes more than $2.25 trillion to the U.S. economy annually, is the largest driver of economic growth in the nation and accounts for the majority of private sector research and development. In 2022, after the brunt of the COVID-19 pandemic led to new competition for a dwindling labor force, the NAM predicted that, by 2030, 2.1 million US jobs in manufacturing could go unfilled.

=== Legislation ===
==== Exemption from federal efficiency standards ====
The NAM supported the EPS Service Parts Act of 2014 (H.R. 5057; 113th Congress), a bill that would exempt certain external power supplies from complying with standards set forth in a final rule published by the United States Department of Energy in February 2014. The United States House Committee on Energy and Commerce describes the bill as a bill that "provides regulatory relief by making a simple technical correction to the 2007 Energy Independence and Security Act to exempt certain power supply (EPS) service and spare parts from federal efficiency standards".

==== Conflict minerals ====
The United States Court of Appeals for the District of Columbia Circuit issued a decision in National Association of Manufacturers, et al. v. SEC et al. on 14 April 2014. The case involved a challenge led by NAM to the Securities Exchange Commission (SEC)'s Exchange Act Rule 13p-1 and associated form SD.1, which the SEC had adopted to implement section 13(p) of the Securities Exchange Act of 1934, which was added by Section 1502 of the Dodd–Frank Wall Street Reform and Consumer Protection Act of 2010. The Court held that requiring companies to state on their websites that any of their products had "not been found to be 'DRC conflict free'" constituted a breach of a company's First Amendment rights.

==== Opposition to federal right-to-repair legislation ====
In July 2024, the NAM signed a letter to members of both the House Committee on Armed Services and the Senate Committee on Armed Services opposing Section 828 of S. 4628, the National Defense Authorization Act for Fiscal Year 2025, concerning right to repair and entitled "Requirement for Contractors to Provide Reasonable Access to Repair Materials", which would require contractors doing business with the US military to agree "to provide the Department of Defense fair and reasonable access to all the repair materials, including parts, tools, and information, used by the manufacturer or provider or their authorized partners to diagnose, maintain, or repair the good or service".

== History ==
The NAM was founded by Thomas P. Egan, late President of the Cincinnati Chamber of Commerce and head of the J.A. Fay and Egan Co., woodworking and machinery company, not long after reading an editorial in the magazine Dixie, out of Atlanta, Georgia, during the depression of 1894. This editorial urged the manufacturers of the time to organize and work together to improve business conditions nationally. Under Egan's leadership, organization began, and a group was created; they called themselves the "Big 50"; he invited them, and asked them to invite others, to Cincinnati. On Jan 25, 1895, in the Oddfellows Temple, where 583 manufacturers attended, the NAM was created. "The U.S. was in the midst of a deep recession and many of the nation's manufacturers saw a strong need to export their products in other countries. One of the NAM's earliest efforts was to call for the creation of the U.S. Department of Commerce." The organization's first president was Thomas Dolan of Philadelphia (not, as erroneously listed in some sources, Samuel P. Bush).

The NAM's early history was marked by frank verbal attacks on labor. In 1903, President David MacLean Parry delivered a speech at its annual convention which argued that unions' goals would result in "despotism, tyranny, and slavery". Parry advocated the establishment of a great national anti-union federation under the control of the NAM, and the NAM responded by initiating such an effort.

In an address at its 1911 convention, NAM President John Kirby Jr. proclaimed, "The American Federation of Labor is engaged in an open warfare against Jesus Christ and his cause."

The NAM also encouraged the creation and propagation of a network of local anti-union organizations, many of which took the name Citizens' Alliance. In October 1903 the local Citizens' Alliance groups were united by a national organization called the Citizens' Industrial Alliance of America.

The NAM, in the late 1930s, used one of the earliest versions of a modern multi-faceted public relations campaign. The aim of this effort was to convince the American public and academia of the existential merits of an economic system free of governmental regulation and initiatives, and to combat the policies of President Franklin Roosevelt. The NAM made efforts to undermine organized labor in the United States before the New Deal.

The NAM lobbied successfully for the 1947 Taft–Hartley Act to restrict the unions' power.

The advent of commercial television led to the NAM's own 15-minute television program, Industry on Parade, which aired from 1950–1960.

President Donald Trump addressed the NAM board in 2017. The NAM hired several former Trump officials as lobbyists. During the 2021 storming of the U.S. Capitol building, the NAM equated the events to "sedition" and called for Vice President Mike Pence to invoke the 25th Amendment of the United States Constitution "to preserve democracy".

== Senior personnel ==
The NAM's Board of Directors includes Chairman David Farr, former CEO of Emerson Electric Company; President Jay Timmons, CEO of the NAM; and Vice Chair of the Board David T. Seaton, Chairman and CEO, Fluor Corporation, among others.

=== NAM presidents ===
- Thomas Dolan (1895)
- Theodore Search (1896–1901)
- David Maclean Parry (1902–1905)
- James Van Cleave (1906–1908)
- John Kirby, Jr (1909–1912)
- George Pope (1913–1917)
- Stephen Mason (1918–1920)
- John Edgerton (1921–1931)
- Robert Lund (1932–1933)
- Clinton L. Bardo (1934–1935)
- Colby M. Chester (1936)
- William B. Warner (1937)
- Charles R. Hook (1938)
- Henning Webb Prentis Jr. (1940)
- Frederick C. Crawford (1943)
- Robert Wason (1946)
- Wallace F. Bennett (1949)
- C.A. Putnam (1950)
- Sandy Trowbridge (1980–1989)
- Jerry Jasinowski (1990–2004)
- John Engler (2004–2011)
- Jay Timmons (2011–present)

=== NAM chairmen ===
- Charles R. Sligh, Jr.
- Stanley Gault
- Michael Campbell
- David Farr
- John Luke
- Charles E. Bunch

== Affiliates ==
According to the NAM's website, the Manufacturing Institute is the 501(c)(3) affiliate of the National Association of Manufacturers. The Manufacturing Institute describes its priorities as the development of a world-class manufacturing workforce, the growth of individual U.S. manufacturing companies and the expansion of the manufacturing sector in regional economies. The Manufacturing Institute is the authority on the attraction, qualification, and development of world-class manufacturing talent.

== Award for Manufacturing Legislative Excellence ==
Since 1998, the NAM has given the Manufacturing Legislative Excellence Award to members of Congress who support the NAM’s pro-growth, pro-manufacturing, pro-worker agenda during the Congressional session.

== See also ==
- Your Town: A Story of America, 1940 anti-New Deal propaganda film
- Industry on Parade, 1950s television series produced by the NAM
- Inter-Industry Advisory Council for Trade Negotiations
- Ohio Manufacturers Association
