= 1945 college football season =

American college football season

- First AP No. 1 of season: Army
- Number of bowls: 8
- Champions: Army (AP); Oklahoma A&M (AFCA)
- Heisman: Doc Blanchard, (fullback, Army)

The 1945 college football season was the 77th season of intercollegiate football in the United States. Competition included schools from the Big Ten Conference, the Pacific Coast Conference (PCC), the Southeastern Conference (SEC), the Big Six Conference, the Southern Conference, the Southwest Conference, and numerous smaller conferences and independent programs. The season followed the end of World War II in August 1945, though many college players remained in military service.

Army was the unanimous No. 1 choice by all 116 voters in the final AP poll and was rated as national champion by all nine contemporary title selectors. The undefeated 1945 Army team was one of the strongest of all time, as during World War II, loose player transfer rules allowed service academies to assemble many of the nation's best players.

In 2016 a committee of former Baylor coach Grant Teaff, Georgia's Vince Dooley, and Texas A&M's R. C. Slocum awarded Oklahoma A&M an American Football Coaches Association championship title for 1945, upon OSU's application for the recognition.

The year's statistical leaders included halfback Bob Fenimore of Oklahoma A&M with 1,641 yards of total offense and 1,048 rushing yards, quarterback Al Dekdebrun of Cornell with 1,227 passing yards, and end Reid Moseley of Georgia with 662 receiving yards.

== Conference and program changes ==
| School | 1944 Conference | 1945 Conference |
|---|---|---|
| Wichita Shockers | Independent | Missouri Valley |

== Season timeline ==
=== September ===
The Associated Press did not poll the writers until the third week of the season. Among the teams that had been ranked in the top six at the end of 1944, only the two service academies (Army and Navy) as well as Ohio State, were still playing a regular schedule. Among the service teams that had ranked high in 1944, Randolph Field, Bainbridge Naval, and Iowa Pre-Flight no longer played against college teams. Some service teams still remained in place, even after the end of World War II.

On September 15, Michigan beat Great Lakes Navy, 27–2. On September 22, Michigan lost to Indiana, 13–7. Minnesota beat Missouri, 34–0. In a Friday night game in Los Angeles, USC beat UCLA 13–6. September 29 Notre Dame beat Illinois 7–0, Army beat Louisville Field, 32–0, and Navy beat Villanova 49–0. USC won at California, 13–2, and Ohio State won at Missouri 47–6.

=== October ===
On October 6, Army beat Wake Forest, 54–0 and Navy beat Duke, 21–0. Ohio State beat Iowa 42–0. Minnesota won at Nebraska 61–7. Notre Dame won at Georgia Tech, 40–7. UCLA beat St. Mary's Pre-Flight, 26–14. The year's first AP Poll was led by No. 1 Army, No. 2 Navy, No. 3 Notre Dame, No. 4 Ohio State, and No. 5 Minnesota.

October 13 At Yankee Stadium in New York, No. 1 Army beat No. 9 Michigan, 28–7. No. 2 Navy stayed unscored upon with a 28–0 win over Penn State. No. 3 Notre Dame beat Dartmouth, 34–0. No. 4 Ohio State beat Wisconsin, 12–0. No. 5 Minnesota beat Fort Warren, 14–0. The top five in the AP Poll remained the same.

October 20 No. 1 Army beat Melville PT Boats 55–13. In Baltimore, No. 2 Navy beat Georgia Tech 20–6. No. 3 Notre Dame won at Pittsburgh, 39–9. No. 4 Ohio State lost to No. 9 Purdue, 35–13. No. 5 Minnesota defeated Northwestern, 30–7. The new top five was No. 1 Army, No. 2 Notre Dame, No. 3 Navy, No. 4 Purdue, and No. 5 Minnesota.

October 27 In New York, No. 1 Army beat No. 19 Duke 48–13. No. 2 Notre Dame beat Iowa 56–0. In Philadelphia, No. 3 Navy defeated No. 7 Penn, 14–7. No. 4 Purdue lost to unranked Northwestern, 26–14. No. 5 Minnesota lost to No. 12 Ohio State, 20–7. In Birmingham, No. 6 Alabama beat Georgia 28–14. No. 8 Indiana beat No. 14 Tulsa 7–2, to reach 5–0–1 and the No. 5 ranking behind Army, Notre Dame, Navy, and Alabama.

=== November ===
November 3 No. 1 Army beat Villanova, 54–0. No. 2 Notre Dame and No. 3 Navy, both 5–0–0, met in Cleveland, and played to a 6–6 tie. In Louisville, No. 4 Alabama defeated Kentucky, 60–19. No. 5 Indiana beat Cornell College of Iowa, 46–6, but dropped to sixth in the next poll. In Los Angeles, No. 8 St. Mary's beat No. 6 USC 26–0 and moved up to fifth place behind Army, Notre Dame, Alabama, and Navy.

November 10 No. 1 Army (6–0–0) and No. 2 Notre Dame (5–0–1) met for a showdown at Yankee Stadium, and it was no contest, with the Cadets winning 48–0. No. 3 Alabama was idle. In Baltimore, No. 4 Navy beat No. 7 Michigan 33–7. No. 5 St. Mary's beat Fresno State, 32–6. No. 6 Indiana won at No. 20 Minnesota, 49–0. The next poll was No. 1 Army, No. 2 Navy, No. 3 Alabama, No. 4 Indiana, and No. 5 St. Mary's.

November 17 In Philadelphia, No. 1 Army beat No. 6 Penn, 61–0. No. 2 Navy defeated Wisconsin 36–7 in Baltimore. In Nashville, No. 3 Alabama beat Vanderbilt, 71–0. No. 4 Indiana won at Pittsburgh, 19–0. No. 5 St. Mary's lost to UCLA, 13–7. No. 7 Notre Dame won at Northwestern 34–7 and moved back up to No. 5, with the top four remaining the same.

November 24 No. 1 Army (8–0–0) and No. 2 Navy (7–0–1), both unbeaten, were idle as they prepared for the Army–Navy Game. No. 3 Alabama beat the Pensacola Naval Air Station, 55–6. No. 4 Indiana closed its season at 9–0–1 with a 26–0 win over No. 18 Purdue. In New Orleans, No. 5 Notre Dame beat Tulane, 32–6. The top five remained the same.

=== December ===
December 1 In the second No. 1 and No. 2 matchup of the year, No. 1 Army (8–0–0) and No. 2 Navy (7–0–1) met at the Army–Navy Game in Philadelphia, with Army winning 32–13 to close a perfect season and a wire-to-wire No. 1 ranking. No. 3 Alabama defeated Mississippi State 55–13 and moved to No. 2 in the final poll with Navy falling to No. 3. Indiana had finished its season and remained at No. 4. No. 5 Notre Dame lost to the Great Lakes Navy team, 39–7. No. 6 Oklahoma A&M, which had finished the season 9–0–0 and accepted an invitation to the Sugar Bowl, rose to fifth in the final poll.

=== Bowl games ===
| Bowl game | Winning team | | Losing team | |
|---|---|---|---|---|
| Rose Bowl | No. 2 Alabama | 34 | No. 11 USC | 14 |
| Sugar Bowl | No. 5 Oklahoma A&M | 33 | No. 7 Saint Mary's | 13 |
| Orange Bowl | Miami (FL) | 13 | No. 16 Holy Cross | 6 |
| Cotton Bowl Classic | No. 10 Texas | 40 | Missouri | 27 |
| Sun Bowl | New Mexico | 34 | Denver | 24 |
| Gator Bowl | No. 19 Wake Forest | 26 | South Carolina | 14 |
| Oil Bowl | No. 18 Georgia | 20 | No. 17 Tulsa | 6 |
| Raisin Bowl | Drake | 13 | Fresno State | 12 |
| Vulcan Bowl | Tennessee A&I | 33 | Texas College | 6 |
| Coconut Bowl | Bethune–Cookman | 32 | Albany State | 0 |
| Azelea Bowl | Knoxville | 18 | Florida N&I | 0 |
| Flower Bowl | Louisiana Normal (Grambling) | 19 | Lane | 6 |

== Conference standings ==
=== Major conference standings ===
1945 Big Six Conference football standings
| | Conf. | | | | | Overall |
| Team | W | | L | | T | W | | L | | T |
|---|---|---|---|---|---|---|---|---|---|---|
| Missouri $ | 5 | – | 0 | – | 0 | 6 | – | 4 | – | 0 |
| Oklahoma | 4 | – | 1 | – | 0 | 5 | – | 5 | – | 0 |
| Iowa State | 2 | – | 2 | – | 1 | 4 | – | 3 | – | 1 |
| Nebraska | 2 | – | 3 | – | 0 | 4 | – | 5 | – | 0 |
| Kansas | 1 | – | 3 | – | 1 | 4 | – | 5 | – | 1 |
| Kansas State | 0 | – | 5 | – | 0 | 1 | – | 7 | – | 0 |
$ – Conference champion

1945 Big Ten Conference football standings
| | Conf. | | | | | Overall |
| Team | W | | L | | T | W | | L | | T |
|---|---|---|---|---|---|---|---|---|---|---|
| No. 4 Indiana $ | 5 | – | 0 | – | 1 | 9 | – | 0 | – | 1 |
| No. 6 Michigan | 5 | – | 1 | – | 0 | 7 | – | 3 | – | 0 |
| No. 12 Ohio State | 5 | – | 2 | – | 0 | 7 | – | 2 | – | 0 |
| Northwestern | 3 | – | 3 | – | 1 | 4 | – | 4 | – | 1 |
| Purdue | 3 | – | 3 | – | 0 | 7 | – | 3 | – | 0 |
| Wisconsin | 2 | – | 3 | – | 1 | 3 | – | 4 | – | 2 |
| Illinois | 1 | – | 4 | – | 1 | 2 | – | 6 | – | 1 |
| Minnesota | 1 | – | 5 | – | 0 | 4 | – | 5 | – | 0 |
| Iowa | 1 | – | 5 | – | 0 | 2 | – | 7 | – | 0 |
$ – Conference champion; Rankings from AP Poll

1945 Border Conference football standings
| | Conf. | | | | | Overall |
| Team | W | | L | | T | W | | L | | T |
|---|---|---|---|---|---|---|---|---|---|---|
| New Mexico | 1 | – | 0 | – | 1 | 6 | – | 1 | – | 1 |
| Texas Tech | 1 | – | 0 | – | 1 | 3 | – | 5 | – | 2 |
| West Texas State | 0 | – | 2 | – | 0 | 2 | – | 6 | – | 0 |
| Arizona | 0 | – | 0 | – | 0 | 5 | – | 0 | – | 0 |
| Arizona State–Flagstaff | 0 | – | 0 | – | 0 | 2 | – | 3 | – | 0 |
$ – Conference champion

1945 Middle Three Conference football standings
| | Conf. | | | | | Overall |
| Team | W | | L | | T | W | | L | | T |
|---|---|---|---|---|---|---|---|---|---|---|
| Rutgers $ | 2 | – | 0 | – | 0 | 5 | – | 2 | – | 0 |
| Lafayette | 1 | – | 1 | – | 0 | 1 | – | 7 | – | 1 |
| Lehigh | 0 | – | 2 | – | 0 | 2 | – | 4 | – | 0 |
$ – Conference champion

1945 Missouri Valley Conference football standings
| | Conf. | | | | | Overall |
| Team | W | | L | | T | W | | L | | T |
|---|---|---|---|---|---|---|---|---|---|---|
| No. 5 Oklahoma A&M $ | 1 | – | 0 | – | 0 | 9 | – | 0 | – | 0 |
| No. 17 Tulsa | 2 | – | 1 | – | 0 | 8 | – | 3 | – | 0 |
| Wichita | 1 | – | 1 | – | 0 | 6 | – | 4 | – | 0 |
| Drake | 1 | – | 2 | – | 0 | 5 | – | 4 | – | 1 |
| Saint Louis | 0 | – | 1 | – | 0 | 5 | – | 4 | – | 0 |
$ – Conference champion; Rankings from AP Poll

1945 Mountain States Conference football standings
| | Conf. | | | | | Overall |
| Team | W | | L | | T | W | | L | | T |
|---|---|---|---|---|---|---|---|---|---|---|
| Denver $ | 4 | – | 1 | – | 0 | 4 | – | 5 | – | 1 |
| Colorado | 3 | – | 1 | – | 0 | 5 | – | 3 | – | 0 |
| Utah | 3 | – | 2 | – | 0 | 4 | – | 4 | – | 0 |
| Utah State | 1 | – | 3 | – | 0 | 4 | – | 3 | – | 0 |
| Colorado A&M | 0 | – | 4 | – | 0 | 2 | – | 5 | – | 1 |
$ – Conference champion

1945 Pacific Coast Conference football standings
| | Conf. | | | | | Overall |
| Team | W | | L | | T | W | | L | | T |
|---|---|---|---|---|---|---|---|---|---|---|
| No. 11 USC $ | 5 | – | 1 | – | 0 | 7 | – | 4 | – | 0 |
| Washington State | 6 | – | 2 | – | 1 | 6 | – | 2 | – | 1 |
| Washington | 6 | – | 3 | – | 0 | 6 | – | 3 | – | 0 |
| Oregon State | 4 | – | 4 | – | 0 | 4 | – | 4 | – | 1 |
| UCLA | 2 | – | 3 | – | 0 | 5 | – | 4 | – | 0 |
| California | 2 | – | 4 | – | 1 | 4 | – | 5 | – | 1 |
| Oregon | 3 | – | 6 | – | 0 | 3 | – | 6 | – | 0 |
| Idaho | 1 | – | 5 | – | 0 | 1 | – | 7 | – | 0 |
| Montana | 0 | – | 1 | – | 0 | 1 | – | 4 | – | 0 |
$ – Conference champion; Rankings from AP Poll

1945 Southeastern Conference football standings
| | Conf. | | | | | Overall |
| Team | W | | L | | T | W | | L | | T |
|---|---|---|---|---|---|---|---|---|---|---|
| No. 2 Alabama $ | 6 | – | 0 | – | 0 | 10 | – | 0 | – | 0 |
| No. 14 Tennessee | 3 | – | 1 | – | 0 | 8 | – | 1 | – | 0 |
| No. 15 LSU | 5 | – | 2 | – | 0 | 7 | – | 2 | – | 0 |
| No. 18 Georgia | 4 | – | 2 | – | 0 | 9 | – | 2 | – | 0 |
| Ole Miss | 3 | – | 3 | – | 0 | 4 | – | 5 | – | 0 |
| Georgia Tech | 2 | – | 2 | – | 0 | 4 | – | 6 | – | 0 |
| Mississippi State | 2 | – | 3 | – | 0 | 6 | – | 3 | – | 0 |
| Auburn | 2 | – | 3 | – | 0 | 5 | – | 5 | – | 0 |
| Vanderbilt | 2 | – | 4 | – | 0 | 3 | – | 6 | – | 0 |
| Florida | 1 | – | 3 | – | 1 | 4 | – | 5 | – | 1 |
| Tulane | 1 | – | 3 | – | 1 | 2 | – | 6 | – | 1 |
| Kentucky | 0 | – | 5 | – | 0 | 2 | – | 8 | – | 0 |
$ – Conference champion; Rankings from AP Poll

1945 Southern Conference football standings
| | Conf. | | | | | Overall |
| Team | W | | L | | T | W | | L | | T |
|---|---|---|---|---|---|---|---|---|---|---|
| No. 13 Duke $ | 4 | – | 0 | – | 0 | 6 | – | 2 | – | 0 |
| No. 19 Wake Forest | 4 | – | 1 | – | 1 | 5 | – | 3 | – | 1 |
| William & Mary | 4 | – | 2 | – | 0 | 6 | – | 3 | – | 0 |
| Clemson | 2 | – | 1 | – | 1 | 6 | – | 3 | – | 1 |
| Maryland | 3 | – | 2 | – | 0 | 6 | – | 2 | – | 1 |
| VMI | 3 | – | 2 | – | 0 | 5 | – | 4 | – | 0 |
| North Carolina | 2 | – | 2 | – | 0 | 5 | – | 4 | – | 0 |
| NC State | 2 | – | 4 | – | 0 | 3 | – | 6 | – | 0 |
| VPI | 2 | – | 5 | – | 0 | 2 | – | 6 | – | 0 |
| South Carolina | 0 | – | 3 | – | 2 | 2 | – | 4 | – | 3 |
| Richmond | 0 | – | 4 | – | 0 | 2 | – | 6 | – | 0 |
$ – Conference champion; Rankings from AP Poll

1945 Southwest Conference football standings
| | Conf. | | | | | Overall |
| Team | W | | L | | T | W | | L | | T |
|---|---|---|---|---|---|---|---|---|---|---|
| No. 10 Texas $ | 5 | – | 1 | – | 0 | 10 | – | 1 | – | 0 |
| SMU | 4 | – | 2 | – | 0 | 5 | – | 6 | – | 0 |
| TCU | 3 | – | 3 | – | 0 | 5 | – | 5 | – | 0 |
| Rice | 3 | – | 3 | – | 0 | 5 | – | 6 | – | 0 |
| Texas A&M | 3 | – | 3 | – | 0 | 6 | – | 4 | – | 0 |
| Baylor | 2 | – | 4 | – | 0 | 5 | – | 5 | – | 1 |
| Arkansas | 1 | – | 5 | – | 0 | 3 | – | 7 | – | 0 |
$ – Conference champion; Rankings from AP Poll

=== Independents ===
1945 Eastern college football independents records
| | Conf. | | | Overall |
| Team | W | L | T | W | | L | | T |
|---|---|---|---|---|---|---|---|---|
| No. 1 Army | | – | | 9 | – | 0 | – | 0 |
| Franklin & Marshall | | – | | 4 | – | 0 | – | 1 |
| No. 20 Columbia | | – | | 8 | – | 1 | – | 0 |
| Temple | | – | | 7 | – | 1 | – | 0 |
| No. 16 Holy Cross | | – | | 8 | – | 2 | – | 0 |
| Tufts | | – | | 4 | – | 1 | – | 0 |
| No. 8 Penn | | – | | 6 | – | 2 | – | 0 |
| Yale | | – | | 6 | – | 3 | – | 0 |
| Massachusetts State | | – | | 2 | – | 1 | – | 1 |
| Harvard | | – | | 5 | – | 3 | – | 0 |
| Penn State | | – | | 5 | – | 3 | – | 0 |
| Cornell | | – | | 5 | – | 4 | – | 0 |
| Villanova | | – | | 4 | – | 4 | – | 0 |
| Boston College | | – | | 3 | – | 4 | – | 0 |
| Brown | | – | | 3 | – | 4 | – | 1 |
| Colgate | | – | | 3 | – | 4 | – | 1 |
| Princeton | | – | | 2 | – | 3 | – | 2 |
| NYU | | – | | 3 | – | 4 | – | 0 |
| Pittsburgh | | – | | 3 | – | 7 | – | 0 |
| Bucknell | | – | | 2 | – | 5 | – | 0 |
| Drexel | | – | | 2 | – | 5 | – | 0 |
| Dartmouth | | – | | 1 | – | 6 | – | 1 |
| Syracuse | | – | | 1 | – | 6 | – | 0 |
| Boston University | | – | | 0 | – | 5 | – | 0 |
| CCNY | | – | | 0 | – | 8 | – | 0 |
Rankings from AP Poll

1945 Midwestern college football independents records
| | Conf. | | | Overall |
| Team | W | L | T | W | | L | | T |
|---|---|---|---|---|---|---|---|---|
| Michigan State Normal | | – | | 5 | – | 0 | – | 1 |
| Central Michigan | | – | | 6 | – | 1 | – | 0 |
| Miami (OH) | | – | | 7 | – | 2 | – | 0 |
| No. 9 Notre Dame | | – | | 7 | – | 2 | – | 1 |
| Detroit | | – | | 6 | – | 3 | – | 0 |
| Great Lakes Navy | | – | | 6 | – | 4 | – | 1 |
| Michigan State | | – | | 5 | – | 3 | – | 1 |
| Marquette | | – | | 5 | – | 4 | – | 1 |
| Bowling Green | | – | | 4 | – | 3 | – | 0 |
| Western Michigan | | – | | 4 | – | 3 | – | 0 |
| Cincinnati | | – | | 4 | – | 4 | – | 0 |
| Ohio | | – | | 3 | – | 4 | – | 0 |
| Ohio Wesleyan | | – | | 3 | – | 4 | – | 0 |
| Carthage | | – | | 2 | – | 3 | – | 0 |
| Wayne | | – | | 2 | – | 5 | – | 1 |
Rankings from AP Poll

1945 Southern college football independents records
| | Conf. | | | Overall |
| Team | W | L | T | W | | L | | T |
|---|---|---|---|---|---|---|---|---|
| Miami (FL) | | – | | 9 | – | 1 | – | 1 |
| No. 3 Navy | | – | | 7 | – | 1 | – | 1 |
| Louisiana Normal (Grambling) | | – | | 9 | – | 2 | – | 0 |
| Virginia | | – | | 7 | – | 2 | – | 0 |
| Chattanooga | | – | | 5 | – | 3 | – | 0 |
| Jacksonville State | | – | | 1 | – | 1 | – | 0 |
| West Virginia | | – | | 2 | – | 6 | – | 1 |
| Tennessee Tech | | – | | 1 | – | 8 | – | 0 |
| Howard (AL) | | – | | 0 | – | 5 | – | 0 |
Rankings from AP Poll

1945 Western college football independents records
| | Conf. | | | Overall |
| Team | W | L | T | W | | L | | T |
|---|---|---|---|---|---|---|---|---|
| No. 7 Saint Mary's | | – | | 7 | – | 2 | – | 0 |
| Nevada | | – | | 7 | – | 3 | – | 0 |
| Fresno State | | – | | 4 | – | 6 | – | 2 |
| San Diego State | | – | | 2 | – | 5 | – | 0 |
| Cal Poly | | – | | 1 | – | 5 | – | 1 |
| Pacific (CA) | | – | | 0 | – | 10 | – | 1 |
| San Francisco State | | – | | 0 | – | 2 | – | 0 |
Rankings from AP Poll

1945 military service football records
| | Conf. | | | | | Overall |
| Team | W | | L | | T | W | | L | | T |
|---|---|---|---|---|---|---|---|---|---|---|
Army Air Forces League
| Third Air Force + | 4 | – | 1 | – | 1 | 7 | – | 2 | – | 1 |
| AAF Training Command + | 4 | – | 1 | – | 1 | 8 | – | 3 | – | 1 |
| Fourth Air Force | 3 | – | 2 | – | 1 | 6 | – | 3 | – | 1 |
| First Air Force | 2 | – | 2 | – | 2 | 3 | – | 2 | – | 3 |
| Air Transport Command | 2 | – | 3 | – | 1 | 6 | – | 3 | – | 2 |
| Personnel Distribution Command | 2 | – | 4 | – | 0 | 6 | – | 5 | – | 0 |
| Second Air Force | 1 | – | 5 | – | 0 | 3 | – | 7 | – | 0 |
Independents
| Fleet City | | | – | | | 11 | – | 0 | – | 1 |
| Jacksonville NAS | | | – | | | 9 | – | 2 | – | 0 |
| Hutchinson NAS | | | – | | | 8 | – | 0 | – | 0 |
| Selman Field | | | – | | | 8 | – | 1 | – | 0 |
| El Toro Marines | | | – | | | 8 | – | 2 | – | 0 |
| Corpus Christi NAS | | | – | | | 7 | – | 1 | – | 0 |
| North Camp Hood | | | – | | | 7 | – | 1 | – | 0 |
| Little Creek | | | – | | | 7 | – | 2 | – | 0 |
| Santa Barbara Marines | | | – | | | 7 | – | 3 | – | 1 |
| Camp Lee | | | – | | | 7 | – | 4 | – | 0 |
| Camp Beale | | | – | | | 6 | – | 1 | – | 2 |
| Farragut NTS | | | – | | | 6 | – | 2 | – | 0 |
| Eastern Flying Training Command | | | – | | | 6 | – | 3 | – | 1 |
| Great Lakes Navy | | | – | | | 6 | – | 4 | – | 1 |
| Hondo AAF | | | – | | | 6 | – | 4 | – | 1 |
| South Camp Hood | | | – | | | 5 | – | 2 | – | 0 |
| Camp Peary | | | – | | | 5 | – | 3 | – | 0 |
| Bainbridge | | | – | | | 5 | – | 4 | – | 0 |
| Fort Benning | | | – | | | 5 | – | 4 | – | 1 |
| Fort Warren | | | – | | | 5 | – | 7 | – | 0 |
| Fort McClellan | | | – | | | 4 | – | 2 | – | 0 |
| San Diego NTS | | | – | | | 4 | – | 2 | – | 0 |
| Atlantic City NAS | | | – | | | 4 | – | 2 | – | 1 |
| Minter Field | | | – | | | 4 | – | 2 | – | 1 |
| Williams Field | | | – | | | 4 | – | 4 | – | 0 |
| Stockton AAF | | | – | | | 4 | – | 5 | – | 2 |
| Barksdale Field | | | – | | | 4 | – | 7 | – | 0 |
| Fort Pierce | | | – | | | 4 | – | 9 | – | 0 |
| Amarillo AAF | | | – | | | 3 | – | 1 | – | 0 |
| Olathe NAS | | | – | | | 3 | – | 2 | – | 0 |
| Albany Navy | | | – | | | 3 | – | 3 | – | 1 |
| Camp Detrick | | | – | | | 3 | – | 4 | – | 0 |
| Kearney AAF | | | – | | | 3 | – | 4 | – | 0 |
| Bergstrom Field | | | – | | | 3 | – | 5 | – | 1 |
| Keesler Field | | | – | | | 3 | – | 6 | – | 1 |
| Melville PT Boats | | | – | | | 2 | – | 1 | – | 0 |
| Great Bend AAF | | | – | | | 2 | – | 4 | – | 0 |
| Saint Mary's Pre-Flight | | | – | | | 2 | – | 4 | – | 1 |
| Gulfport AAF | | | – | | | 2 | – | 5 | – | 0 |
| Pensacola NAS | | | – | | | 2 | – | 7 | – | 1 |
| Squantum NAS | | | – | | | 1 | – | 1 | – | 0 |
| Camp Blanding | | | – | | | 1 | – | 2 | – | 0 |
| Luke Field | | | – | | | 1 | – | 2 | – | 0 |
| Miami NAS | | | – | | | 1 | – | 2 | – | 0 |
| Miami NTC | | | – | | | 1 | – | 3 | – | 0 |
| NSB New London | | | – | | | 1 | – | 3 | – | 0 |
| Oceana NAS | | | – | | | 1 | – | 3 | – | 0 |
| Fort Riley | | | – | | | 1 | – | 4 | – | 0 |
| Lake Charles AAF | | | – | | | 1 | – | 4 | – | 0 |
| Ellington Field | | | – | | | 1 | – | 4 | – | 1 |
| Cherry Point Marines | | | – | | | 1 | – | 8 | – | 0 |
| Dalhart AAF | | | – | | | 0 | – | 3 | – | 0 |
| Homestead AAB | | | – | | | 0 | – | 3 | – | 0 |
| Fort Monroe | | | – | | | 0 | – | 7 | – | 0 |
+ – Conference co-champions

=== Minor conferences ===
| Conference | Champion(s) | Record |
|---|---|---|
| Central Intercollegiate Athletics Association | Virginia State College | 7–0–1 |
| Central Intercollegiate Athletic Conference | No champion | — |
| Far Western Conference | No champion | — |
| Indiana Intercollegiate Conference | Valparaiso | 4–0 |
| Iowa Intercollegiate Athletic Conference | Central (IA) | 5–0 |
| Kansas Collegiate Athletic Conference | No champion | — |
| Lone Star Conference | No champion | — |
| Midwest Collegiate Athletic Conference | No champion | — |
| Minnesota Intercollegiate Athletic Conference | Gustavus Adolphus | 4–0 |
| Missouri Intercollegiate Athletic Association | No champion | — |
| Missouri Intercollegiate Athletic Association | No champion | — |
| Nebraska College Athletic Conference | Nebraska Wesleyan | 2–0 |
| New Mexico Intercollegiate Conference | No champion | — |
| North Central Intercollegiate Athletic Conference | No champion | — |
| North Dakota College Athletic Conference | No champion | — |
| Ohio Athletic Conference | Oberlin | 2–0 |
| Oklahoma Collegiate Athletic Conference | No champion | — |
| Pacific Northwest Conference | No champion | — |
| Pennsylvania State Athletic Conference | No champion | — |
| Rocky Mountain Athletic Conference | Colorado College | 1–0 |
| South Dakota Intercollegiate Conference | No champion | — |
| Southern California Intercollegiate Athletic Conference | Redlands | 4–0 |
| Southern Intercollegiate Athletic Conference | Florida A&M College | 6–0 |
| Southwestern Athletic Conference | Wiley (TX) | 6–0 |
| State Teacher's College Conference of Minnesota | No champion | — |
| Texas Collegiate Athletic Conference | No champion | — |
| Washington Intercollegiate Conference | No champion | — |
| Wisconsin State Teachers College Conference | No champion | — |

=== Minor conference standings ===
1945 Colored Intercollegiate Athletic Association football standings
| | Conf. | | | | | Overall |
| Team | W | | L | | T | W | | L | | T |
|---|---|---|---|---|---|---|---|---|---|---|
| Virginia State $ | 6 | – | 0 | – | 1 | 8 | – | 0 | – | 2 |
| West Virginia State | 4 | – | 0 | – | 2 | 5 | – | 1 | – | 2 |
| North Carolina College | 5 | – | 1 | – | 0 | 6 | – | 3 | – | 0 |
| Johnson C. Smith | 3 | – | 3 | – | 1 | 5 | – | 4 | – | 1 |
| Morgan State | 5 | – | 2 | – | 0 | 5 | – | 2 | – | 0 |
| Howard | 4 | – | 3 | – | 0 | 4 | – | 4 | – | 0 |
| Virginia Union | 4 | – | 3 | – | 0 | 4 | – | 4 | – | 0 |
| Delaware State | 3 | – | 3 | – | 0 | 4 | – | 3 | – | 0 |
| Lincoln (PA) | 2 | – | 4 | – | 0 | 2 | – | 5 | – | 0 |
| North Carolina A&T | 2 | – | 5 | – | 0 | 2 | – | 5 | – | 0 |
| Hampton | 2 | – | 6 | – | 0 | 2 | – | 6 | – | 0 |
| Bluefield State | 1 | – | 5 | – | 0 | 1 | – | 6 | – | 0 |
| Shaw | 0 | – | 6 | – | 0 | 0 | – | 6 | – | 0 |
$ – Conference champion; Conference standings were based on the Dickinson System.

1945 Illinois Intercollegiate Athletic Conference football standings
| | Conf. | | | | | Overall |
| Team | W | | L | | T | W | | L | | T |
|---|---|---|---|---|---|---|---|---|---|---|
| Illinois State Normal $ | 3 | – | 1 | – | 0 | 4 | – | 3 | – | 0 |
| Southern Illinois | 2 | – | 1 | – | 1 | 4 | – | 1 | – | 2 |
| Northern Illinois State | 2 | – | 2 | – | 0 | 4 | – | 3 | – | 0 |
| Eastern Illinois | 1 | – | 1 | – | 2 | 2 | – | 3 | – | 2 |
| Western Illinois | 0 | – | 3 | – | 1 | 1 | – | 5 | – | 1 |
$ – Conference champion

1945 Indiana Intercollegiate Conference football standings
| | Conf. | | | | | Overall |
| Team | W | | L | | T | W | | L | | T |
|---|---|---|---|---|---|---|---|---|---|---|
| Valparaiso $ | 4 | – | 0 | – | 0 | 6 | – | 1 | – | 0 |
| DePauw | 1 | – | 0 | – | 0 | 3 | – | 2 | – | 0 |
| Ball State | 4 | – | 1 | – | 1 | 4 | – | 1 | – | 1 |
| Butler | 3 | – | 2 | – | 0 | 3 | – | 3 | – | 0 |
| Earlham | 3 | – | 3 | – | 0 | 3 | – | 3 | – | 0 |
| Wabash | 1 | – | 1 | – | 1 | 2 | – | 3 | – | 1 |
| Central Normal | 2 | – | 3 | – | 0 | 2 | – | 4 | – | 0 |
| Indiana State | 1 | – | 2 | – | 0 | 2 | – | 4 | – | 0 |
| Manchester | 0 | – | 2 | – | 0 | 0 | – | 2 | – | 0 |
| Franklin (IN) | 0 | – | 5 | – | 0 | 0 | – | 5 | – | 0 |
$ – Conference champion

1945 Iowa Conference football standings
| | Conf. | | | | | Overall |
| Team | W | | L | | T | W | | L | | T |
|---|---|---|---|---|---|---|---|---|---|---|
| Central (IA) $ | 5 | – | 0 | – | 0 | 7 | – | 1 | – | 0 |
| Iowa Wesleyan | 1 | – | 0 | – | 0 | 3 | – | 2 | – | 0 |
| Wartburg | 3 | – | 2 | – | 1 | 3 | – | 2 | – | 1 |
| Loras | 0 | – | 0 | – | 0 | 5 | – | 2 | – | 0 |
| Dubuque | 2 | – | 2 | – | 0 | 4 | – | 2 | – | 0 |
| Simpson (IA) | 1 | – | 2 | – | 0 | 2 | – | 5 | – | 0 |
| Luther | 1 | – | 3 | – | 0 | 2 | – | 5 | – | 0 |
| Upper Iowa | 1 | – | 4 | – | 1 | 1 | – | 4 | – | 1 |
| Parsons | 0 | – | 1 | – | 0 | 1 | – | 5 | – | 0 |
$ – Conference champion

1945 Minnesota Intercollegiate Athletic Conference football standings
| | Conf. | | | | | Overall |
| Team | W | | L | | T | W | | L | | T |
|---|---|---|---|---|---|---|---|---|---|---|
| Gustavus Adolphus $ | 4 | – | 0 | – | 0 | 6 | – | 0 | – | 0 |
| St. Thomas (MN) | 3 | – | 1 | – | 0 | 5 | – | 1 | – | 0 |
| Macalester | 2 | – | 1 | – | 0 | 3 | – | 1 | – | 0 |
| St. Olaf | 1 | – | 2 | – | 0 | 2 | – | 3 | – | 0 |
| Saint John's (MN) | 1 | – | 4 | – | 0 | 1 | – | 6 | – | 0 |
| Concordia (MN) | 0 | – | 1 | – | 0 | 2 | – | 2 | – | 2 |
| Augsburg | 0 | – | 1 | – | 0 | 0 | – | 3 | – | 0 |
| Saint Mary's (MN) | 0 | – | 1 | – | 0 | 0 | – | 5 | – | 0 |
$ – Conference champion

1945 New England Conference football standings
| | Conf. | | | | | Overall |
| Team | W | | L | | T | W | | L | | T |
|---|---|---|---|---|---|---|---|---|---|---|
| Connecticut + | 2 | – | 0 | – | 0 | 7 | – | 1 | – | 0 |
| Rhode Island State + | 1 | – | 0 | – | 0 | 2 | – | 1 | – | 0 |
| Maine | 0 | – | 3 | – | 0 | 0 | – | 5 | – | 0 |
+ – Conference co-champions

1945 North State Conference football standings
| | Conf. | | | | | Overall |
| Team | W | | L | | T | W | | L | | T |
|---|---|---|---|---|---|---|---|---|---|---|
| High Point + | 5 | – | 0 | – | 0 | 5 | – | 0 | – | 1 |
| Catawba + | 2 | – | 0 | – | 0 | 10 | – | 1 | – | 0 |
| Appalachian State | 1 | – | 3 | – | 0 | 1 | – | 6 | – | 0 |
| Western Carolina | 0 | – | 2 | – | 0 | 1 | – | 3 | – | 0 |
| Guilford | 0 | – | 3 | – | 0 | 0 | – | 7 | – | 0 |
+ – Conference co-champions

1945 Ohio Athletic Conference football standings
| | Conf. | | | | | Overall |
| Team | W | | L | | T | W | | L | | T |
|---|---|---|---|---|---|---|---|---|---|---|
| Oberlin $ | 3 | – | 0 | – | 0 | 8 | – | 0 | – | 0 |
| Capital | 5 | – | 1 | – | 0 | 5 | – | 1 | – | 0 |
| Baldwin–Wallace | 4 | – | 1 | – | 0 | 6 | – | 4 | – | 0 |
| Muskingum | 4 | – | 1 | – | 1 | 6 | – | 1 | – | 1 |
| Ashland | 3 | – | 1 | – | 0 | 4 | – | 1 | – | 0 |
| Otterbein | 3 | – | 1 | – | 2 | 4 | – | 2 | – | 2 |
| Wittenberg | 3 | – | 3 | – | 0 | 3 | – | 4 | – | 0 |
| Denison | 2 | – | 2 | – | 0 | 2 | – | 4 | – | 0 |
| Case | 1 | – | 3 | – | 0 | 2 | – | 5 | – | 0 |
| Heidelberg | 1 | – | 4 | – | 1 | 1 | – | 4 | – | 1 |
| Ohio Northern | 0 | – | 2 | – | 0 | 3 | – | 2 | – | 0 |
| Wooster | 0 | – | 4 | – | 0 | 0 | – | 6 | – | 0 |
| Kenyon | 0 | – | 6 | – | 0 | 0 | – | 6 | – | 0 |
$ – Conference champion

1945 Southern Intercollegiate Athletic Conference football standings
| | Conf. | | | | | Overall |
| Team | W | | L | | T | W | | L | | T |
|---|---|---|---|---|---|---|---|---|---|---|
| Florida A&M $ | 6 | – | 0 | – | 0 | 9 | – | 1 | – | 0 |
| Clark (GA) | 4 | – | 1 | – | 1 | 4 | – | 3 | – | 1 |
| Morris Brown | 3 | – | 2 | – | 0 | 5 | – | 2 | – | 1 |
| Tuskegee | 2 | – | 2 | – | 1 | 6 | – | 6 | – | 1 |
| Knoxville | 2 | – | 3 | – | 0 | 5 | – | 5 | – | 0 |
| Alabama State | 2 | – | 5 | – | 0 | 2 | – | 6 | – | 0 |
| Alabama A&M | 1 | – | 3 | – | 0 | 2 | – | 6 | – | 0 |
| Morehouse | 1 | – | 5 | – | 0 | 1 | – | 6 | – | 0 |
| Benedict | 0 | – | 1 | – | 0 | 0 | – | 3 | – | 0 |
| Lane | 1 | – | 0 | – | 0 | 3 | – | 2 | – | 0 |
$ – Conference champion

1945 Southwestern Athletic Conference football standings
| | Conf. | | | | | Overall |
| Team | W | | L | | T | W | | L | | T |
|---|---|---|---|---|---|---|---|---|---|---|
| Wiley $ | 6 | – | 0 | – | 0 | 10 | – | 0 | – | 0 |
| Southern | 5 | – | 1 | – | 0 | 6 | – | 3 | – | 1 |
| Texas College | 3 | – | 2 | – | 1 | 7 | – | 3 | – | 1 |
| Langston | 3 | – | 3 | – | 0 | 5 | – | 3 | – | 0 |
| Samuel Huston | 1 | – | 3 | – | 2 | ? | – | ? | – | ? |
| Prairie View | 1 | – | 4 | – | 1 | 3 | – | 5 | – | 1 |
| Arkansas AM&N | 1 | – | 5 | – | 0 | 2 | – | 6 | – | 0 |
$ – Conference champion

== Rankings ==
The teams ranked highest in the final Associated Press poll in December 1945 were:

| Rank | Team | Record | Notes |
|---|---|---|---|
| 1 | Army | 9–0 | Outscored opponents, 412 to 46. Unanimous No. 1 choice by all 116 voters in the AP poll. Led country in total offense (462.7 yards per game). Fullback Doc Blanchard won 1945 Heisman Trophy. Four consensus All-Americans: Blanchard; halfback Glenn Davis; tackle Tex Coulter; and guard John Green. Part of 32-game undefeated streak covering entire 1944, 1945, and 1946 seasons. |
| 2 | Alabama | 10–0 | SEC champion. Defeated USC in 1946 Rose Bowl. Led nation in total defense (109.9 yards per game) and ranked second in total offense (462.7 yards per game). Harry Gilmer had 905 passing yards. Center Vaughn Mancha was a consensus All-American. |
| 3 | Navy | 7–1–1 | Lost to Army on December 1 in battle of No. 1 vs. No. 2. End Dick Duden was a consensus All-American. |
| 4 | Indiana | 9–0–1 | Big Ten champion. Outscored opponents, 279 to 56. Halfback George Taliaferro was first African-American Big Ten rushing leader. End Bob Ravensberg was a consensus All-American. |
| 5 | Oklahoma A&M | 9–0 | Missouri Valley champion. Defeated Saint Mary's (CA) in 1946 Sugar Bowl. Consensus All-American halfback Bob Fenimore led country in total offense and rushing. |
| 6 | Michigan | 7–3 | All three losses to teams ranked in top four: Army, Navy, and Indiana. Center Harold Watts team MVP. |
| 7 | Saint Mary's (CA) | 7–2 | Led nation in passing offense (161.3 yards per game). Consensus All-American halfback Herman Wedemeyer second nationally with 1,040 passing yards. |
| 8 | Penn | 6–2 | Tackle George Savitsky a consensus All-American. Only losses to No. 1 Army and No. 3 Navy. |
| 9 | Notre Dame | 7–2–1 | Quarterback Frank Dancewicz and guard John Mastrangelo were second-team All-Americans. Losses to No. 1 Army and unranked Great Lakes Navy. |
| 10 | Texas | 10–1 | Southwest Conference champion. Defeated Missouri in 1946 Cotton Bowl Classic. |

== Awards and honors ==
=== Heisman Trophy voting ===
The Heisman Trophy is given to the year's most outstanding player

| Player | School | Position | Total |
|---|---|---|---|
| Doc Blanchard | Army | FB | 860 |
| Glenn Davis | Army | HB | 638 |
| Bob Fenimore | Oklahoma A&M | HB | 187 |
| Herman Wedemeyer | St. Mary's (CA) | HB | 152 |
| Harry Gilmer | Alabama | HB | 132 |
| Frank Dancewicz | Notre Dame | QB | 56 |
| Warren Amling | Ohio State | G/OT | 42 |
| Pete Pihos | Indiana | E/FB | 38 |

== Statistical leaders ==
=== Team leaders ===
==== Total offense ====
| Rank | Team | Games played | Total plays | Yards gained | Yards per game |
|---|---|---|---|---|---|
| 1 | Army | 9 | 526 | 4164 | 462.7 |
| 2 | Alabama | 9 | 557 | 3795 | 421.7 |
| 3 | Oklahoma A&M | 8 | 496 | 3363 | 420.4 |
| 4 | St. Mary's | 8 | 502 | 2995 | 374.4 |
| 5 | Georgia | 9 | 575 | 3291 | 365.7 |
| 6 | LSU | 9 | 539 | 3269 | 363.2 |
| 7 | Notre Dame | 9 | 626 | 3180 | 353.3 |
| 8 | Maryland | 7 | 427 | 2433 | 347.6 |
| 9 | Indiana | 10 | 619 | 3254 | 325.4 |
| 10 | Yale | 9 | 648 | 2911 | 323.4 |
| 11 | Tennessee | 7 | 424 | 2260 | 322.9 |
| 12 | Colorado College | 8 | 462 | 2433 | 304.1 |
| 13 | Mississippi State | 8 | 542 | 2422 | 302.8 |
| 14 | Tulsa | 10 | 597 | 3021 | 302.1 |
| 15 | Minnesota | 9 | 609 | 2710 | 301.1 |

==== Total defense ====
| Rank | Team | Games played | Total plays | Yards gained | Yards per game |
|---|---|---|---|---|---|
| 1 | Alabama | 9 | 452 | 989 | 109.9 |
| 2 | Temple | 8 | 403 | 1005 | 125.6 |
| 3 | Holy Cross | 8 | 371 | 1131 | 141.4 |
| 4 | Mississippi State | 8 | 365 | 1191 | 148.9 |
| 5 | St. Mary's | 8 | 397 | 1236 | 154.5 |
| 6 | Tulsa | 10 | 491 | 1550 | 155.0 |
| 7 | Yale | 9 | 427 | 1441 | 160.1 |
| 8 | Tennessee | 7 | 368 | 1142 | 163.1 |
| 9 | Indiana | 10 | 536 | 1641 | 164.1 |
| 10 | Army | 9 | 515 | 1528 | 169.8 |
| 11 | Washington | 9 | 497 | 1535 | 170.6 |
| 12 | Texas | 10 | 541 | 1710 | 171.0 |
| 13 | Texas A&M | 10 | 544 | 1763 | 176.3 |
| 14 | Georgia | 6 | 309 | 1074 | 179.0 |
| 15 | Colgate | 6 | 310 | 1097 | 182.8 |

==== Rushing offense ====
| Rank | Team | Games | Rushes | Yards gained | Yards per game |
|---|---|---|---|---|---|
| 1 | Army | 9 | 424 | 3238 | 359.8 |
| 2 | LSU | 9 | 443 | 2705 | 300.6 |
| 3 | Alabama | 9 | 440 | 2679 | 297.7 |
| 4 | Oklahoma A&M | 8 | 383 | 2293 | 286.6 |
| 5 | Notre Dame | 9 | 451 | 2395 | 266.1 |
| 6 | Maryland | 7 | 345 | 1846 | 263.7 |
| 7 | Mississippi State | 8 | 443 | 2028 | 253.5 |
| 8 | Ohio State | 9 | 505 | 2133 | 237.0 |
| 9 | Colorado College | 8 | 366 | 1882 | 235.3 |
| 10 | Indiana | 10 | 484 | 2331 | 233.1 |
| 11 | Tennessee | 7 | 328 | 1631 | 233.0 |
| 12 | Duke | 8 | 375 | 1806 | 225.8 |
| 13 | Missouri | 9 | 476 | 2018 | 224.2 |
| 14 | Temple | 8 | 405 | 1791 | 223.9 |
| 15 | Tulsa | 10 | 449 | 2236 | 223.6 |

==== Rushing defense ====
| Rank | Team | Games | Rushes | Yards gained | Yards per game |
|---|---|---|---|---|---|
| 1 | Alabama | 9 | 320 | 305 | 33.9 |
| 2 | Tennessee | 7 | 231 | 385 | 55.0 |
| 3 | Temple | 8 | 296 | 520 | 65.0 |
| 4 | St. Mary's | 8 | 240 | 591 | 73.9 |
| 5 | Penn State | 8 | 295 | 634 | 79.3 |
| 6 | Yale | 9 | 300 | 721 | 80.1 |
| 7 | Army | 9 | 357 | 728 | 80.9 |
| 8 | Texas | 10 | 353 | 813 | 81.3 |
| 9 | Mississippi State | 8 | 256 | 670 | 83.8 |
| 10 | Tulsa | 10 | 353 | 850 | 85.0 |
| 11 | Colgate | 6 | 215 | 591 | 98.5 |
| 12 | Indiana | 10 | 393 | 1004 | 100.4 |
| 13 | Washington | 9 | 344 | 908 | 100.9 |
| 14 | California | 10 | 406 | 1023 | 102.3 |
| 15 | Detroit | 9 | 342 | 933 | 103.7 |

==== Passing offense ====
| Rank | Team | Games | Att. | Compl. | Int. | Pct. Compl. | Yards | Yds/Game |
|---|---|---|---|---|---|---|---|---|
| 1 | St. Mary's | 8 | 150 | 74 | 16 | .493 | 1290 | 161.3 |
| 2 | Cornell | 9 | 207 | 95 | 17 | .459 | 1351 | 150.1 |
| 3 | Georgia | 9 | 159 | 71 | 17 | .447 | 1335 | 148.3 |
| 4 | Oklahoma A&M | 8 | 113 | 54 | 11 | .478 | 1070 | 133.8 |
| 5 | Wake Forest | 5 | 93 | 44 | 8 | .473 | 634 | 126.8 |
| 6 | Alabama | 9 | 117 | 71 | 4 | .607 | 1116 | 124.0 |
| 7 | SMU | 11 | 263 | 123 | 26 | .468 | 1310 | 119.1 |
| 8 | TCU | 10 | 190 | 87 | 19 | .458 | 1183 | 118.3 |
| 9 | Colgate | 6 | 94 | 46 | 8 | .489 | 694 | 115.7 |
| 10 | South Carolina | 7 | 103 | 44 | 14 | .427 | 808 | 115.4 |
| 11 | Kansas State | 8 | 174 | 62 | 20 | .356 | 921 | 115.1 |
| 12 | Yale | 9 | 138 | 69 | 15 | .500 | 1015 | 112.8 |
| 13 | Virginia | 6 | 77 | 32 | 5 | .416 | 682 | 112.0 |
| 14 | Texas | 10 | 154 | 67 | 16 | .435 | 1095 | 109.5 |
| 15 | Michigan State | 9 | 168 | 89 | 12 | .530 | 958 | 106.4 |

=== Individual leaders ===
==== Total offense ====
| Rank | Player | Team | Games | Plays | Rush Yds | Pass Yds | Total Yds | Avg Gain per Play |
|---|---|---|---|---|---|---|---|---|
| 1 | Bob Fenimore | Oklahoma A&M | 8 | 203 | 1048 | 593 | 1641 | 8.08 |
| 2 | Harry Gilmer | Alabama | 9 | 167 | 552 | 905 | 1457 | 8.72 |
| 3 | Herman Wedemeyer | St. Mary's | 8 | 199 | 388 | 1040 | 1428 | 7.18 |
| 4 | Stan Kozlowski | Holy Cross | 9 | 247 | 841 | 438 | 1279 | 5.18 |
| 5 | Al Dekdebrun | Cornell | 9 | 282 | 27 | 1227 | 1254 | 4.45 |
| 6 | Glenn Davis | Army | 9 | 102 | 944 | 253 | 1197 | 11.74 |
| 7 | Gene Rossides | Columbia | 8 | 152 | 506 | 497 | 1103 | 7.45 |
| 8 | Leon Joslin | TCU | 10 | 208 | 61 | 955 | 1016 | 4.88 |
| 9 | Curtis Kuykendall | Auburn | 10 | 183 | 616 | 367 | 983 | 5.37 |
| 10 | Linwood Sexton | Wichita | 8 | 155 | 707 | 246 | 953 | 6.15 |
| 11 | Bobby Thomason | VMI | 9 | 213 | 359 | 593 | 952 | 4.47 |
| 12 | Ollie Cline | Ohio State | 9 | 172 | 931 | 0 | 931 | 5.41 |
| 13 | Thompson | Wisconsin | 9 | 195 | 579 | 330 | 909 | 4.66 |
| 14 | Jerry Niles | Iowa | 9 | 217 | 6 | 872 | 878 | 4.05 |
| 15 | Walt Schlinkman | Texas Tech | 10 | 147 | 871 | 0 | 871 | 5.93 |
| 16 | Nick Sacrinty | Nevada | 5 | 153 | 278 | 578 | 856 | 5.59 |
| 17 | Ed Cody | Purdue | 10 | 157 | 847 | 0 | 847 | 5.39 |
| 18 | Ellis | Virginia | 8 | 124 | 290 | 542 | 832 | 6.71 |
| 19 | Lund | Tennessee | 7 | 128 | 466 | 360 | 826 | 6.45 |
| 20 | George Taliaferro | Indiana | 10 | 175 | 728 | 96 | 824 | 4.71 |

==== Rushing ====
| Rank | Player | Team | Games | Rushes | Yds Gained | Yds Lost | Net Yds | Avg Gain per Play |
|---|---|---|---|---|---|---|---|---|
| 1 | Bob Fenimore | Oklahoma A&M | 8 | 142 | 1119 | 71 | 1048 | 7.38 |
| 2 | Glenn Davis | Army | 9 | 82 | 980 | 36 | 944 | 11.51 |
| 3 | Ollie Cline | Ohio State | 9 | 171 | 933 | 2 | 931 | 5.44 |
| 4 | Walt Schlinkman | Texas Tech | 10 | 145 | 908 | 37 | 871 | 6.01 |
| 5 | Ed Cody | Purdue | 10 | 157 | 868 | 21 | 847 | 5.39 |
| 6 | Stan Kozlowski | Holy Cross | 9 | 186 | 916 | 75 | 841 | 4.52 |
| 7 | George Taliaferro | Indiana | 10 | 156 | 801 | 73 | 728 | 4.67 |
| 8 | Doc Blanchard | Army | 9 | 101 | 726 | 8 | 718 | 7.11 |
| 9 | Lowell Tew | Alabama | 9 | 88 | 737 | 22 | 715 | 8.13 |
| 10 | Linwood Sexton | Wichita | 8 | 120 | 762 | 55 | 707 | 5.89 |
| 11 | Ben Bendrick | Wisconsin | 9 | 142 | 723 | 42 | 681 | 4.80 |
| 12 | Gene Knight | LSU | 9 | 85 | 709 | 30 | 679 | 7.99 |
| 13 | Cal Rossi | UCLA | 6 | 95 | 700 | 21 | 679 | 7.15 |
| 14 | Dick Conners | Northwestern | 9 | 116 | 685 | 14 | 671 | 5.78 |
| 15 | Camp Wilson | Tulsa | 10 | 138 | 679 | 17 | 662 | 4.80 |
| 16 | Lynn Chewning | VMI | 9 | 129 | 707 | 62 | 645 | 5.00 |
| 17 | Harper Davis | Mississippi State | 9 | 122 | 710 | 66 | 644 | 5.28 |
| 18 | Bill Canfield | Purdue | 10 | 143 | 654 | 25 | 629 | 4.40 |
| 19 | Curtis Kuykendall | Auburn | 10 | 132 | 692 | 76 | 616 | 4.67 |
| 20 | Guy Brown | Detroit | 9 | 82 | 649 | 39 | 610 | 7.44 |

==== Passing ====
| Rank | Player | Team | Games | Att. | Compl. | Int. | Pct. Compl. | Yds. |
|---|---|---|---|---|---|---|---|---|
| 1 | Al Dekdebrun | Cornell | 9 | 194 | 90 | 15 | .464 | 1227 |
| 2 | Leon Joslin | TCU | 10 | 142 | 69 | 11 | .486 | 955 |
| 3 | Jerry Niles | Iowa | 9 | 179 | 63 | 15 | .352 | 872 |
| 4 | Herman Wedemeyer | St. Mary's | 8 | 103 | 59 | 5 | .573 | 1040 |
| 5 | Jack O. Price | Baylor | 11 | 125 | 59 | 16 | .472 | 708 |
| 6 | Harry Gilmer | Alabama | 9 | 88 | 57 | 3 | .648 | 905 |
| 7 | Arthur Dakos | Yale | 9 | 109 | 56 | 10 | .514 | 723 |
| 8 | Bob DeMoss | Purdue | 10 | 117 | 55 | 12 | .470 | 742 |
| 9 | Russ Reader | Michigan State | 9 | 90 | 53 | 5 | .589 | 613 |
| 10 | Hotsinger | Georgia Tech | 9 | 116 | 49 | 9 | .422 | 682 |
| 11 | Bob Thomason | VMI | 9 | 114 | 46 | 10 | .404 | 593 |
| 12 | Gray | Oregon State | 9 | 92 | 41 | 12 | .446 | 359 |
| 13 | Nick Sacrinty | Wake Forest | 5 | 81 | 40 | 5 | .494 | 578 |
| 14 | Doak Walker | SMU | 5 | 65 | 38 | 4 | .585 | 387 |
| 15 | Ben Raimondi | Indiana | 10 | 84 | 37 | 3 | .440 | 593 |
| 16 | Howard Maley | SMU | 11 | 79 | 36 | 6 | .456 | 288 |
| 17 | Evans | Penn | 8 | 68 | 35 | 6 | .515 | 517 |
| 18 | Y. A. Tittle | LSU | 9 | 76 | 35 | 9 | .461 | 414 |
| 19 | Hardey | Texas Tech | 10 | 67 | 33 | 7 | .493 | 427 |
| 20 | Wolff | Pittsburgh | 9 | 83 | 33 | 9 | .398 | 499 |

==== Receiving ====
| Rank | Player | Team | Games | Receptions | Receiving Yards |
|---|---|---|---|---|---|
| 1 | Reid Moseley | Georgia | 10 | 31 | 662 |
| 2 | Gene Wilson | SMU | 11 | 31 | 311 |
| 3 | Steve Contos | Michigan State | 9 | 31 | 285 |
| 4 | Hub Bechtol | Texas | 10 | 25 | 389 |
| 5 | O'Conner | St. Mary's | 8 | 23 | 373 |
| 6 | Bill Canfield | Purdue | 10 | 23 | 314 |
| 7 | Joiner | Baylor | 11 | 21 | 319 |
| 8 | Paul Walker | Yale | 9 | 21 | 277 |
| 9 | Jones | Kentucky | 6 | 19 | 369 |
| 10 | Mason | TCU | 10 | 19 | 218 |
| 11 | Seymour Kuppersmith | NYU | 7 | 19 | 207 |
| 12 | Neill Armstrong | Oklahoma A&M | 8 | 18 | 316 |
| 13 | Steiner | Alabama | 9 | 18 | 315 |
| 14 | Page | SMU | 11 | 18 | 234 |
| 15 | Cordeiro | St. Mary's | 8 | 17 | 346 |
| 16 | Morris | Northwestern | 9 | 16 | 301 |
| 17 | Pierce | Baylor | 11 | 16 | 183 |
| 18 | R. Anderson | Oregon | 9 | 15 | 290 |
| 19 | Ryan | St. Mary's | 8 | 15 | 276 |
| 20 | Cash | Tulane | 9 | 15 | 260 |

==== Scoring ====
| Rank | Player | Team | Points | TD | PAT | FG |
|---|---|---|---|---|---|---|
| 1 | Walt Trojanowski | Connecticut | 132 | 22 | 0 | 0 |
| 2 | Fowler | Arkansas Tech | 129 | 20 | 9 | 0 |
| 3 | Doc Blanchard | Army | 115 | 19 | 1 | 0 |
| 4 | Ross | Wiley | 114 | 19 | 0 | 0 |
| 5 | Glenn Davis | Army | 108 | 18 | 0 | 0 |
| 6 | Harry Ghaul | Miami (FL) | 100 | 13 | 22 | 0 |
| 7 | Bass | Tennessee A&I | 96 | 14 | 12 | 0 |
| 8 | Lou Kusserow | Columbia | 90 | 15 | 0 | 0 |
| 9 | Stan Koslowski | Holy Cross | 87 | 12 | 15 | 0 |
| 10 | Greene | Catawba | 84 | 14 | 0 | 0 |
| 11 | Bob Pfohl | Merchant Marine | 83 | 13 | 5 | 0 |
| 12 | Jones | Virginia State | 77 | 11 | 11 | 0 |
| 13 | Bob Fenimore | Oklahoma A&M | 72 | 12 | 0 | 0 |
| 13 | Ed Cody | Purdue | 72 | 12 | 0 | 0 |
| 13 | Ragan | Redlands | 72 | 12 | 0 | 0 |
| 13 | Montgomery | Florida A&M | 72 | 12 | 0 | 0 |
| 17 | Herman Wedemeyer | St. Mary's | 71 | 9 | 17 | 0 |
| 17 | Cromer | Colorado State | 71 | 10 | 11 | 0 |
| 19 | Fred Grant | Alabama | 66 | 11 | 0 | 0 |
| 19 | Lowell Tew | Alabama | 66 | 11 | 0 | 0 |
| 19 | Gene Rossides | Columbia | 66 | 11 | 0 | 0 |
| 19 | Goode | Texas A&M | 66 | 11 | 0 | 0 |
| 19 | Brown | Virginia | 66 | 11 | 0 | 0 |
| 19 | Boswell | Oberlin | 66 | 11 | 0 | 0 |
| 19 | Perry | Compton | 66 | 11 | 0 | 0 |

=== Longest plays ===
Longest punts (including roll)
1. Witherspoon, Florida N&I vs. Knoxville - 82 yards
2. Stabler, Charleston Teachers vs. Macomb Teachers - 80 yards
3. Lewis, Texas College vs. Wiley - 76 yards
4. Pattee, Kansas vs. Marquette - 75 yards
4. Perry, Southern vs. Langston - 75 yards
4. Pass, Johnson C. Smith vs. North Carolina College - 75 yards

Longest rushing plays
1. Fleming, Montana State vs. Faragut Navy - 95 yards
1. Engraham, Florida A&M vs. Tuskegee - 95 yards
3. Montgomery, Florida A&M vs. Moorhouse - 92 yards
4. Aschenbrenner, Great Lakes vs. Michigan State - 90 yards
4. Faunce, Minot Teachers vs. Winnipeg Bombers - 90 yards

Longest forward-pass plays
1. Green to Robinson, West Virginia State vs. Virginia State - 100 yards
2. Gray to Fuqua, Vanderbilt vs. LSU - 87 yards
3. Corlett to Fisher, Johnson C. Smith vs. Shaw - 85 yards
4. Powell to Edmonston, California vs. St. Mary's - 83 yards
5. Wieche to Hoover, Miami (OH) vs. Bowling Green - 82 yards

Longest interception runbacks
1. Needs, Oklahoma vs. Kansas State - 100 yards
1. Joiner, Baylor vs. TCU - 100 yards
1. Howard, Iowa State vs. Kansas State - 100 yards
1. Turner, NC State vs. Duke - 100 yards
1. Pfohl, Merchant Marine vs. Ursinus - 100 yards

Longest punt runbacks
1. Goode, Texas A&M vs. Ellington Field - 98 yards
2. Morris, Colorado vs. Utah - 95 yards
3. Robinson, Pittsburgh vs. Michigan State - 87 yards
4. Welch, SMU vs. Blackland AFB - 85 yards
5. Robinson, Pittsburgh vs. Penn State - 84 yards

Longest kickoff runbacks
1. McCandless, Marin JC vs. Santa Rosa - 100 yards
2. Howard, Iowa State vs. Kansas State - 96 yards
3. Talliaferro, Indiana vs. Minnesota - 95 yards
4. Miller, Indiana vs. Nebraska - 94 yards
5. Kishbaugh, Bloomsburg Teachers vs. East Stroudsburg Teachers - 92 yards

== See also ==
- 1945 College Football All-America Team
- 1945 Little All-America college football team
