= 1945 Brown Bears football team =

American college football season

1945 Brown Bears football
- Conference: Independent
- Record: 3–4–1
- Head coach: Rip Engle (2nd season)
- Captain: R. D. Williams
- Home stadium: Brown Stadium

1945 Eastern college football independents records
	Conf.			Overall
Team	W	L	T	W		L		T
No. 1 Army		–		9	–	0	–	0
Franklin & Marshall		–		4	–	0	–	1
No. 20 Columbia		–		8	–	1	–	0
Temple		–		7	–	1	–	0
No. 16 Holy Cross		–		8	–	2	–	0
Tufts		–		4	–	1	–	0
No. 8 Penn		–		6	–	2	–	0
Yale		–		6	–	3	–	0
Massachusetts State		–		2	–	1	–	1
Harvard		–		5	–	3	–	0
Penn State		–		5	–	3	–	0
Cornell		–		5	–	4	–	0
Villanova		–		4	–	4	–	0
Boston College		–		3	–	4	–	0
Brown		–		3	–	4	–	1
Colgate		–		3	–	4	–	1
Princeton		–		2	–	3	–	2
NYU		–		3	–	4	–	0
Pittsburgh		–		3	–	7	–	0
Bucknell		–		2	–	5	–	0
Drexel		–		2	–	5	–	0
Dartmouth		–		1	–	6	–	1
Syracuse		–		1	–	6	–	0
Boston University		–		0	–	5	–	0
CCNY		–		0	–	8	–	0
Rankings from AP Poll

The 1945 Brown Bears football team represented Brown University during the 1945 college football season.

In their second season under head coach Charles "Rip" Engle, the Bears compiled a 3–4–1 record, and were outscored 141 to 123 by opponents. R.D. Williams was the team captain.

Brown played its home games at Brown Stadium in Providence, Rhode Island.

== Schedule ==
Date	Opponent	Site	Result	Attendance	Source
September 29	at Penn	Franklin Field; Philadelphia, PA	L 0–50	51,000	
October 6	Boston College	Brown Stadium; Providence, RI	W 51–6	10,657	
October 20	Holy Cross	Brown Stadium; Providence, RI	L 0–25	25,000	
October 27	Columbia	Brown Stadium; Providence, RI	L 6–27	15,000	
November 3	Coast Guard	Brown Stadium; Providence, RI	W 33–6	10,000	
November 10	at Yale	Yale Bowl; New Haven, CT	W 20–7	15,000	
November 17	Harvard	Brown Stadium; Providence, RI	L 7–14	15,000	
November 24	Colgate	Brown Stadium; Providence, RI	T 6–6	12,000	
