= 1945 Boston University Terriers football team =

American college football season

1945 Boston University Terriers football
- Conference: Independent
- Record: 0–5
- Head coach: Robert McKelvey (first 3 games); Walt Holmer (last 2 games)
- Home stadium: Nickerson Field

1945 Eastern college football independents records
	Conf.			Overall
Team	W	L	T	W		L		T
No. 1 Army		–		9	–	0	–	0
Franklin & Marshall		–		4	–	0	–	1
No. 20 Columbia		–		8	–	1	–	0
Temple		–		7	–	1	–	0
No. 16 Holy Cross		–		8	–	2	–	0
Tufts		–		4	–	1	–	0
No. 8 Penn		–		6	–	2	–	0
Yale		–		6	–	3	–	0
Massachusetts State		–		2	–	1	–	1
Harvard		–		5	–	3	–	0
Penn State		–		5	–	3	–	0
Cornell		–		5	–	4	–	0
Villanova		–		4	–	4	–	0
Boston College		–		3	–	4	–	0
Brown		–		3	–	4	–	1
Colgate		–		3	–	4	–	1
Princeton		–		2	–	3	–	2
NYU		–		3	–	4	–	0
Pittsburgh		–		3	–	7	–	0
Bucknell		–		2	–	5	–	0
Drexel		–		2	–	5	–	0
Dartmouth		–		1	–	6	–	1
Syracuse		–		1	–	6	–	0
Boston University		–		0	–	5	–	0
CCNY		–		0	–	8	–	0
Rankings from AP Poll

The 1945 Boston University Terriers football team was an American football team that represented Boston University as an independent during the 1945 college football season. The team was lead interim head coach Robert McKelvey until head coach Walt Holmer was discharged from the United States Navy and resumed his coaching duties on November 5, 1945. The team compiled a 0–5 record, was shut out in four of five games, and was outscored by a total of 235 to 3. The season finale against Harvard was so one-sided that head coaches Dick Harlow and Walt Holmer elected to cut 5 minutes from each of the final two quarters.

== Schedule ==
Date	Opponent	Site	Result	Attendance	Source
October 20	at Tufts	Medford, MA	L 0–70		
October 27	Squantum NAS	Nickerson Field; Boston, MA	L 3–21	500	
November 3	at Rhode Island State	Meade Stadium; Kingston, RI	L 0–30		
November 17	at Connecticut	Gardner Dow Athletic Fields; Storrs, CT	L 0–54	4,000	
November 24	at Harvard	Harvard Stadium; Boston, MA	L 0–60	6,000	
