= 1945 Temple Owls football team =

American college football season

1945 Temple Owls football
- Conference: Independent
- Record: 7–1
- Head coach: Ray Morrison (6th season)
- Home stadium: Temple Stadium

1945 Eastern college football independents records
	Conf.			Overall
Team	W	L	T	W		L		T
No. 1 Army		–		9	–	0	–	0
Franklin & Marshall		–		4	–	0	–	1
No. 20 Columbia		–		8	–	1	–	0
Temple		–		7	–	1	–	0
No. 16 Holy Cross		–		8	–	2	–	0
Tufts		–		4	–	1	–	0
No. 8 Penn		–		6	–	2	–	0
Yale		–		6	–	3	–	0
Massachusetts State		–		2	–	1	–	1
Harvard		–		5	–	3	–	0
Penn State		–		5	–	3	–	0
Cornell		–		5	–	4	–	0
Villanova		–		4	–	4	–	0
Boston College		–		3	–	4	–	0
Brown		–		3	–	4	–	1
Colgate		–		3	–	4	–	1
Princeton		–		2	–	3	–	2
NYU		–		3	–	4	–	0
Pittsburgh		–		3	–	7	–	0
Bucknell		–		2	–	5	–	0
Drexel		–		2	–	5	–	0
Dartmouth		–		1	–	6	–	1
Syracuse		–		1	–	6	–	0
Boston University		–		0	–	5	–	0
CCNY		–		0	–	8	–	0
Rankings from AP Poll

The 1945 Temple Owls football team was an American football team that represented Temple University as an independent during the 1945 college football season. In its sixth season under head coach Ray Morrison, the team compiled a 7–1 record and outscored opponents by a total of 198 to 51. On November 10, Temple defeated then undefeated No. 10. Holy Cross.

Center Mort Rochheiser and quarterback Jack Burns were selected by the Associated Press as first-team players on the 1945 All-Pennsylvania football team. Guard Ed Virshup and back Phil Slosburg were named to the second team. Fullback Jack Wilson was named to the third team.

The team played its home games at Temple Stadium in Philadelphia.

== Schedule ==
Date	Opponent	Site	Result	Attendance	Source
September 28	Syracuse	Temple Stadium; Philadelphia, PA	W 7–6	15,000	
October 5	NYU	Temple Stadium; Philadelphia, PA	W 59–0	15,000	
October 12	Bucknell	Temple Stadium; Philadelphia, PA	W 64–0	17,000	
October 19	West Virginia	Temple Stadium; Philadelphia, PA	W 28–12	19,000	
October 27	at Pittsburgh	Pitt Stadium; Pittsburgh, PA	W 6–0	12,000	
November 3	Lafayette^{†}	Temple Stadium; Philadelphia, PA	W 20–0	12,000	
November 10	at Penn State	New Beaver Field; State College, PA	L 0–27	16,000	
November 17	at No. 10 Holy Cross	Fitton Field; Worcester, MA	W 14–6	25,000	
^{†}Homecoming; Rankings from AP Poll released prior to the game
