= 1945 CCNY Beavers football team =

American college football season

1945 CCNY Beavers football
- Conference: Independent
- Record: 0–8
- Head coach: Louis Gebhard (1st season)
- Home stadium: Lewisohn Stadium

1945 Eastern college football independents records
	Conf.			Overall
Team	W	L	T	W		L		T
No. 1 Army		–		9	–	0	–	0
Franklin & Marshall		–		4	–	0	–	1
No. 20 Columbia		–		8	–	1	–	0
Temple		–		7	–	1	–	0
No. 16 Holy Cross		–		8	–	2	–	0
Tufts		–		4	–	1	–	0
No. 8 Penn		–		6	–	2	–	0
Yale		–		6	–	3	–	0
Massachusetts State		–		2	–	1	–	1
Harvard		–		5	–	3	–	0
Penn State		–		5	–	3	–	0
Cornell		–		5	–	4	–	0
Villanova		–		4	–	4	–	0
Boston College		–		3	–	4	–	0
Brown		–		3	–	4	–	1
Colgate		–		3	–	4	–	1
Princeton		–		2	–	3	–	2
NYU		–		3	–	4	–	0
Pittsburgh		–		3	–	7	–	0
Bucknell		–		2	–	5	–	0
Drexel		–		2	–	5	–	0
Dartmouth		–		1	–	6	–	1
Syracuse		–		1	–	6	–	0
Boston University		–		0	–	5	–	0
CCNY		–		0	–	8	–	0
Rankings from AP Poll

The 1945 CCNY Beavers football team was an American football team that represented the City College of New York (CCNY) as an independent during the 1945 college football season. In their first season under head coach Louis Gebhard, the team compiled an 0–8 record.

== Schedule ==
Date	Opponent	Site	Result	Attendance	Source
September 29	Ursinus	Lewisohn Stadium; New York, NY	L 0–24		
October 6	Brooklyn	Lewisohn Stadium; New York, NY	L 0–38	1,000	
October 13	at Drexel	Drexel Field; Philadelphia, PA	L 7–19	1,600	
October 20	at NYU	Ohio Field; Bronx, NY	L 0–47	7,000	
October 28	at Scranton	Russell Park; Carbondale, PA	L 0–27	5,000	
November 3	at Brooklyn	Kingsmen Field; Brooklyn, NY	L 0–24	6,000	
November 10	Atlantic City NAS	Lewisohn Stadium; New York, NY	L 6–42		
November 17	Bullis School	Lewisohn Stadium; New York, NY	L 6–27		
