= 1945 Syracuse Orangemen football team =

American college football season

1945 Syracuse Orangemen football
- Conference: Independent
- Record: 1–6
- Head coach: Ossie Solem (8th season)
- Captain: Angelo Acocella
- Home stadium: Archbold Stadium

1945 Eastern college football independents records
	Conf.			Overall
Team	W	L	T	W		L		T
No. 1 Army		–		9	–	0	–	0
Franklin & Marshall		–		4	–	0	–	1
No. 20 Columbia		–		8	–	1	–	0
Temple		–		7	–	1	–	0
No. 16 Holy Cross		–		8	–	2	–	0
Tufts		–		4	–	1	–	0
No. 8 Penn		–		6	–	2	–	0
Yale		–		6	–	3	–	0
Massachusetts State		–		2	–	1	–	1
Harvard		–		5	–	3	–	0
Penn State		–		5	–	3	–	0
Cornell		–		5	–	4	–	0
Villanova		–		4	–	4	–	0
Boston College		–		3	–	4	–	0
Brown		–		3	–	4	–	1
Colgate		–		3	–	4	–	1
Princeton		–		2	–	3	–	2
NYU		–		3	–	4	–	0
Pittsburgh		–		3	–	7	–	0
Bucknell		–		2	–	5	–	0
Drexel		–		2	–	5	–	0
Dartmouth		–		1	–	6	–	1
Syracuse		–		1	–	6	–	0
Boston University		–		0	–	5	–	0
CCNY		–		0	–	8	–	0
Rankings from AP Poll

The 1945 Syracuse Orangemen football team represented Syracuse University as an independent during the 1945 college football season. The Orangemen were led by eighth-year head coach Ossie Solem and played their home games at Archbold Stadium in Syracuse, New York. Solem resigned as head coach following a disappointing 1–6 campaign. The team's sole win came in the school's first-ever match-up with eventual-rival West Virginia.

== Schedule ==
Date	Opponent	Site	Result	Attendance	Source
September 22	Cornell	Archbold Stadium; Syracuse, NY	L 14–26	22,000	
September 28	at Temple	Temple Stadium; Philadelphia, PA	L 6–7	15,000	
October 6	at Columbia	Baker Field; New York, NY	L 0–32	8,000	
October 12	West Virginia	Archbold Stadium; Syracuse, NY (rivalry)	W 12–0	5,000	
October 27	Dartmouth	Archbold Stadium; Syracuse, NY	L 0–8	10,000	
November 3	at Penn State	New Beaver Field; State College, PA (rivalry)	L 0–26	8,505	
November 17	Colgate	Archbold Stadium; Syracuse, NY (rivalry)	L 6–7	20,000	
