= 1945 NYU Violets football team =

American college football season

1945 NYU Violets football
- Conference: Independent
- Record: 3–4
- Head coach: John J. Weinheimer (2nd season)
- Home stadium: Ohio Field

1945 Eastern college football independents records
| | Conf. | | | Overall |
| Team | W | L | T | W | | L | | T |
|---|---|---|---|---|---|---|---|---|
| No. 1 Army | | – | | 9 | – | 0 | – | 0 |
| Franklin & Marshall | | – | | 4 | – | 0 | – | 1 |
| No. 20 Columbia | | – | | 8 | – | 1 | – | 0 |
| Temple | | – | | 7 | – | 1 | – | 0 |
| No. 16 Holy Cross | | – | | 8 | – | 2 | – | 0 |
| Tufts | | – | | 4 | – | 1 | – | 0 |
| No. 8 Penn | | – | | 6 | – | 2 | – | 0 |
| Yale | | – | | 6 | – | 3 | – | 0 |
| Massachusetts State | | – | | 2 | – | 1 | – | 1 |
| Harvard | | – | | 5 | – | 3 | – | 0 |
| Penn State | | – | | 5 | – | 3 | – | 0 |
| Cornell | | – | | 5 | – | 4 | – | 0 |
| Villanova | | – | | 4 | – | 4 | – | 0 |
| Boston College | | – | | 3 | – | 4 | – | 0 |
| Brown | | – | | 3 | – | 4 | – | 1 |
| Colgate | | – | | 3 | – | 4 | – | 1 |
| Princeton | | – | | 2 | – | 3 | – | 2 |
| NYU | | – | | 3 | – | 4 | – | 0 |
| Pittsburgh | | – | | 3 | – | 7 | – | 0 |
| Bucknell | | – | | 2 | – | 5 | – | 0 |
| Drexel | | – | | 2 | – | 5 | – | 0 |
| Dartmouth | | – | | 1 | – | 6 | – | 1 |
| Syracuse | | – | | 1 | – | 6 | – | 0 |
| Boston University | | – | | 0 | – | 5 | – | 0 |
| CCNY | | – | | 0 | – | 8 | – | 0 |
Rankings from AP Poll

The 1945 NYU Violets football team was an American football team that represented New York University as an independent during the 1945 college football season.

In its second season under head coach John J. Weinheimer, the team compiled a 3–4 record and was outscored 125–89.

The Violets played home games at Ohio Field on NYU's University Heights campus in the Bronx borough of New York City.

== Schedule ==
| Date | Opponent | Site | Result | Attendance | Source |
|---|---|---|---|---|---|
| October 5 | at Temple | Temple Stadium; Philadelphia, PA | L 0–59 | 15,000 | |
| October 12 | at Boston College | Fenway Park; Boston, MA | L 0–28 | 5,000 | |
| October 20 | CCNY | Ohio Field; Bronx, NY | W 47–0 | 7,000 | |
| October 27 | Brooklyn | Ohio Field; Bronx, NY | W 13–6 | 7,000 | |
| November 3 | Rochester | Ohio Field; Bronx, NY | L 3–19 | 4,000 | |
| November 10 | Lehigh | Ohio Field; Bronx, NY | W 19–0 | 4,000 | |
| November 17 | at Rutgers | Rutgers Stadium; Piscataway, NJ | L 7–13 | 10,000 | |
