= Robert McKelvey =

American football player and coach

Biographical details
- Died: February 4, 1989

Playing career
- 1925–1927: Villanova

Coaching career (HC unless noted)
- 1928–1933: Somerville HS (MA) (assistant)
- 1934–1937: Boston University (assistant)
- 1938–1946: Boston University (freshmen)
- 1945: Boston University

Head coaching record
- Overall: 0–3

Robert Edward McKelvey (? – February 4, 1989) was an American football player and coach. He served as the interim football coach at Boston University for the 1945 season, compiling a record of 0–3 while head coach Walt Holmer was serving in the United States Navy.

McKelvey attended Somerville High School, where he was classmates with future professional baseball players Danny MacFayden, Shanty Hogan, and Josh Billings. He attended Villanova University and played tackle for the Villanova Wildcats football team from 1925 to 1927.

In 1928, McKelvey became an assistant coach at Somerville High. In 1934 he joined the coaching staff at Boston University. In 1938 he became the school's freshman coach and chief scout. Boston University did not play football in 1943 or 1944, but returned to the field in 1945. McKelvey served as interim head coach until Walt Holmer was discharged from the Navy and resumed his coaching duties on November 5, 1945.

McKelvey spent his later years in Wayne, Pennsylvania. He died on February 4, 1989.

== Head coaching record ==
Year	Team	Overall	Conference	Standing	Bowl/playoffs
Boston University Terriers (Independent) (1945)
1945	Boston University	0–3			
Boston University:		0–3			
Total:		0–3			
