= 1945 Harvard Crimson football team =

American college football season

1945 Harvard Crimson football
- Conference: Independent
- Record: 5–3
- Head coach: Dick Harlow (9th season)
- Captain: Robert Cowen II
- Home stadium: Harvard Stadium

1945 Eastern college football independents records
	Conf.			Overall
Team	W	L	T	W		L		T
No. 1 Army		–		9	–	0	–	0
Franklin & Marshall		–		4	–	0	–	1
No. 20 Columbia		–		8	–	1	–	0
Temple		–		7	–	1	–	0
No. 16 Holy Cross		–		8	–	2	–	0
Tufts		–		4	–	1	–	0
No. 8 Penn		–		6	–	2	–	0
Yale		–		6	–	3	–	0
Massachusetts State		–		2	–	1	–	1
Harvard		–		5	–	3	–	0
Penn State		–		5	–	3	–	0
Cornell		–		5	–	4	–	0
Villanova		–		4	–	4	–	0
Boston College		–		3	–	4	–	0
Brown		–		3	–	4	–	1
Colgate		–		3	–	4	–	1
Princeton		–		2	–	3	–	2
NYU		–		3	–	4	–	0
Pittsburgh		–		3	–	7	–	0
Bucknell		–		2	–	5	–	0
Drexel		–		2	–	5	–	0
Dartmouth		–		1	–	6	–	1
Syracuse		–		1	–	6	–	0
Boston University		–		0	–	5	–	0
CCNY		–		0	–	8	–	0
Rankings from AP Poll

The 1945 Harvard Crimson football team was an American football team that represented Harvard University during the 1945 college football season. Head coach Dick Harlow returned for his ninth year, after a two-year gap while serving in the Navy. The team compiled a 5–3 record and outscored its opponents 161 to 80. Robert Cowen II was the team captain.

During Harlow's absence, Harvard played a shortened "informal" schedule in 1943 and 1944, lacking its traditional Ivy League opponents. Harlow's return from military service, as well as the renewal of ties with Ivy opponents Brown and Yale, made 1945 a transition year. The university's record book omits the "informal" designation for 1945, but contemporary press accounts describe that year's program as "informal" and preparing for a return to the top tier of college football in 1946.

Harvard played its home games at Harvard Stadium in the Allston neighborhood of Boston, Massachusetts.

== Schedule ==
Date	Opponent	Site	Result	Attendance	Source
October 6	Tufts	Harvard Stadium; Boston, MA	L 6–7	10,000	
October 13	Rochester	Harvard Stadium; Boston, MA	W 21–13	9,000	
October 20	Naval Submarine Base New London	Harvard Stadium; Boston, MA	L 7–18	11,000	
October 27	Coast Guard	Harvard Stadium; Boston, MA	W 25–0	12,000	
November 10	Merchant Marine	Harvard Stadium; Boston, MA	W 28–7	8,000	
November 17	at Brown	Brown Stadium; Providence, RI	W 14–7	15,000	
November 24	Boston University	Harvard Stadium; Boston, MA	W 60–0	6,000	
December 1	at Yale	Yale Bowl; New Haven, CT (The Game)	L 0–28	35,000	
