= 1945 Bucknell Bison football team =

American college football season

1945 Bucknell Bison football
- Conference: Independent
- Record: 2–5
- Head coach: J. Ellwood Ludwig (2nd season)
- Captains: Harold Stefl; Robert Williams
- Home stadium: Memorial Stadium

1945 Eastern college football independents records
	Conf.			Overall
Team	W	L	T	W		L		T
No. 1 Army		–		9	–	0	–	0
Franklin & Marshall		–		4	–	0	–	1
No. 20 Columbia		–		8	–	1	–	0
Temple		–		7	–	1	–	0
No. 16 Holy Cross		–		8	–	2	–	0
Tufts		–		4	–	1	–	0
No. 8 Penn		–		6	–	2	–	0
Yale		–		6	–	3	–	0
Massachusetts State		–		2	–	1	–	1
Harvard		–		5	–	3	–	0
Penn State		–		5	–	3	–	0
Cornell		–		5	–	4	–	0
Villanova		–		4	–	4	–	0
Boston College		–		3	–	4	–	0
Brown		–		3	–	4	–	1
Colgate		–		3	–	4	–	1
Princeton		–		2	–	3	–	2
NYU		–		3	–	4	–	0
Pittsburgh		–		3	–	7	–	0
Bucknell		–		2	–	5	–	0
Drexel		–		2	–	5	–	0
Dartmouth		–		1	–	6	–	1
Syracuse		–		1	–	6	–	0
Boston University		–		0	–	5	–	0
CCNY		–		0	–	8	–	0
Rankings from AP Poll

The 1945 Bucknell Bison football team was an American football team that represented Bucknell University as an independent during the 1945 college football season. In its second and final season under head coach J. Ellwood Ludwig, the team compiled a 2–5 record. Harold Stefl and Robert Williams were the team captains.

The team played its home games at Memorial Stadium in Lewisburg, Pennsylvania.

== Schedule ==
Date	Opponent	Site	Result	Attendance	Source
September 12	vs. Scranton	Mt. Carmel H.S.; Mount Carmel, PA	W 20–6	10,000	
September 22	Villanova	Memorial Stadium; Lewisburg, PA	L 7–19	5,000	
September 29	at Cornell	Schoellkopf Field; Ithaca, NY	L 8–19	3,000	
October 6	at Pittsburgh	Pitt Stadium; Pittsburgh, PA	L 0–38	10,000	
October 12	at Temple	Temple Stadium; Philadelphia, PA	L 0–64	17,000	
October 20	Penn State^{†}	Memorial Stadium; Lewisburg, PA	L 7–46	7,500	
October 27	at Lafayette	Fisher Field; Easton, PA	W 26–2	3,000	
^{†}Homecoming
