= 1945 Yale Bulldogs football team =

American college football season

1945 Yale Bulldogs football
- Conference: Independent
- Record: 6–3
- Head coach: Howie Odell (4th season)
- Captain: Paul Walker
- Home stadium: Yale Bowl

1945 Eastern college football independents records
	Conf.			Overall
Team	W	L	T	W		L		T
No. 1 Army		–		9	–	0	–	0
Franklin & Marshall		–		4	–	0	–	1
No. 20 Columbia		–		8	–	1	–	0
Temple		–		7	–	1	–	0
No. 16 Holy Cross		–		8	–	2	–	0
Tufts		–		4	–	1	–	0
No. 8 Penn		–		6	–	2	–	0
Yale		–		6	–	3	–	0
Massachusetts State		–		2	–	1	–	1
Harvard		–		5	–	3	–	0
Penn State		–		5	–	3	–	0
Cornell		–		5	–	4	–	0
Villanova		–		4	–	4	–	0
Boston College		–		3	–	4	–	0
Brown		–		3	–	4	–	1
Colgate		–		3	–	4	–	1
Princeton		–		2	–	3	–	2
NYU		–		3	–	4	–	0
Pittsburgh		–		3	–	7	–	0
Bucknell		–		2	–	5	–	0
Drexel		–		2	–	5	–	0
Dartmouth		–		1	–	6	–	1
Syracuse		–		1	–	6	–	0
Boston University		–		0	–	5	–	0
CCNY		–		0	–	8	–	0
Rankings from AP Poll

The 1945 Yale Bulldogs football team represented Yale University in the 1945 college football season. The Bulldogs were led by fourth-year head coach Howie Odell, played their home games at the Yale Bowl and finished the season with a 6–3 record.

== Schedule ==
Date	Opponent	Site	Result	Attendance	Source
September 29	Tufts	Yale Bowl; New Haven, CT	W 27–7	20,000	
October 6	Holy Cross	Yale Bowl; New Haven, CT	L 0–21	25,000	
October 13	at Columbia	Baker Field; New York, NY	L 13–27	30,000	
October 27	Cornell	Yale Bowl; New Haven, CT	W 18–7	30,000	
November 3	Dartmouth	Yale Bowl; New Haven, CT	W 6–0	45,000	
November 10	Brown	Yale Bowl; New Haven, CT	L 7–20	15,000	
November 17	Coast Guard	Yale Bowl; New Haven, CT	W 41–6	10,000	
November 24	at Princeton	Palmer Stadium; Princeton, NJ (rivalry)	W 20–14	40,000	
December 1	Harvard	Yale Bowl; New Haven, CT (The Game)	W 28–0	35,000	
