= 1945 Cornell Big Red football team =

American college football season

1945 Cornell Big Red football
- Conference: Independent
- Record: 5–4
- Head coach: Edward McKeever (1st season)
- Captain: Allen Dekdebrun
- Home stadium: Schoellkopf Field

1945 Eastern college football independents records
	Conf.			Overall
Team	W	L	T	W		L		T
No. 1 Army		–		9	–	0	–	0
Franklin & Marshall		–		4	–	0	–	1
No. 20 Columbia		–		8	–	1	–	0
Temple		–		7	–	1	–	0
No. 16 Holy Cross		–		8	–	2	–	0
Tufts		–		4	–	1	–	0
No. 8 Penn		–		6	–	2	–	0
Yale		–		6	–	3	–	0
Massachusetts State		–		2	–	1	–	1
Harvard		–		5	–	3	–	0
Penn State		–		5	–	3	–	0
Cornell		–		5	–	4	–	0
Villanova		–		4	–	4	–	0
Boston College		–		3	–	4	–	0
Brown		–		3	–	4	–	1
Colgate		–		3	–	4	–	1
Princeton		–		2	–	3	–	2
NYU		–		3	–	4	–	0
Pittsburgh		–		3	–	7	–	0
Bucknell		–		2	–	5	–	0
Drexel		–		2	–	5	–	0
Dartmouth		–		1	–	6	–	1
Syracuse		–		1	–	6	–	0
Boston University		–		0	–	5	–	0
CCNY		–		0	–	8	–	0
Rankings from AP Poll

The 1945 Cornell Big Red football team was an American football team that represented Cornell University as an independent during the 1945 college football season. In its first season under head coach Edward McKeever, the team compiled a 5–4 record and outscored its opponents 169 to 166. Allen Dekdebrun was the team captain.

Cornell played its home games at Schoellkopf Field in Ithaca, New York.

== Schedule ==
Date	Opponent	Site	Result	Attendance	Source
September 22	at Syracuse	Archbold Stadium; Syracuse, NY	W 26–14	25,000	
September 29	Bucknell	Schoellkopf Field; Ithaca, NY	W 19–8	3,000	
October 6	Naval Submarine Base New London	Schoellkopf Field; Ithaca, NY	W 39–0		
October 13	Princeton	Schoellkopf Field; Ithaca, NY	L 6–14	14,000	
October 27	at Yale	Yale Bowl; New Haven, CT	L 7–18	30,000	
November 3	at No. 12 Columbia	Baker Field; New York, NY (rivalry)	L 26–34	35,000	
November 10	Colgate	Schoellkopf Field; Ithaca, NY (rivalry)	W 20–6	17,000	
November 17	at Dartmouth	Memorial Field; Hanover, NH (rivalry)	W 20–13	12,000	
November 24	at No. 11 Penn	Franklin Field; Philadelphia, PA (rivalry)	L 6–59	67,000	
Rankings from AP Poll released prior to the game
