= 1945 Villanova Wildcats football team =

American college football season

1945 Villanova Wildcats football
- Conference: Independent
- Record: 4–4
- Head coach: Jordan Olivar (3rd season)
- Captain: Charles Wede
- Home stadium: Shibe Park

1945 Eastern college football independents records
	Conf.			Overall
Team	W	L	T	W		L		T
No. 1 Army		–		9	–	0	–	0
Franklin & Marshall		–		4	–	0	–	1
No. 20 Columbia		–		8	–	1	–	0
Temple		–		7	–	1	–	0
No. 16 Holy Cross		–		8	–	2	–	0
Tufts		–		4	–	1	–	0
No. 8 Penn		–		6	–	2	–	0
Yale		–		6	–	3	–	0
Massachusetts State		–		2	–	1	–	1
Harvard		–		5	–	3	–	0
Penn State		–		5	–	3	–	0
Cornell		–		5	–	4	–	0
Villanova		–		4	–	4	–	0
Boston College		–		3	–	4	–	0
Brown		–		3	–	4	–	1
Colgate		–		3	–	4	–	1
Princeton		–		2	–	3	–	2
NYU		–		3	–	4	–	0
Pittsburgh		–		3	–	7	–	0
Bucknell		–		2	–	5	–	0
Drexel		–		2	–	5	–	0
Dartmouth		–		1	–	6	–	1
Syracuse		–		1	–	6	–	0
Boston University		–		0	–	5	–	0
CCNY		–		0	–	8	–	0
Rankings from AP Poll

The 1945 Villanova Wildcats football team represented the Villanova University during the 1945 college football season. The head coach was Jordan Olivar, coaching his third season with the Wildcats. The team played their home games at Villanova Stadium in Villanova, Pennsylvania.

== Schedule ==
Date	Time	Opponent	Site	Result	Attendance	Source
September 22		at Bucknell	Memorial Stadium; Lewisburg, PA	W 19–7	5,000	
September 29		at Navy	Thompson Stadium; Annapolis, MD	L 0–49		
October 7		vs. Marquette	Civic Stadium; Buffalo, NY	W 6–0	15,000	
October 14		at No. 12 Holy Cross	Fitton Field; Worcester, MA	L 7–26	26,000	
October 20		Detroit	Shibe Park; Philadelphia, PA	W 14–0	11,000	
October 27		at Tennessee	Shields–Watkins Field; Knoxville, TN	L 2–33	15,000	
November 3		at No. 1 Army	Michie Stadium; West Point, NY	L 0–54	12,000	
November 10	8:30 p.m.	Boston College	Shibe Park; Philadelphia, PA	W 41–0	4,000	
Rankings from AP Poll released prior to the game
