= 1945 Colgate Red Raiders football team =

American college football season

1945 Colgate Red Raiders football
- Conference: Independent
- Record: 3–4–1
- Head coach: Andrew Kerr (17th season)
- Captain: Game captains
- Home stadium: Colgate Athletic Field

1945 Eastern college football independents records
	Conf.			Overall
Team	W	L	T	W		L		T
No. 1 Army		–		9	–	0	–	0
Franklin & Marshall		–		4	–	0	–	1
No. 20 Columbia		–		8	–	1	–	0
Temple		–		7	–	1	–	0
No. 16 Holy Cross		–		8	–	2	–	0
Tufts		–		4	–	1	–	0
No. 8 Penn		–		6	–	2	–	0
Yale		–		6	–	3	–	0
Massachusetts State		–		2	–	1	–	1
Harvard		–		5	–	3	–	0
Penn State		–		5	–	3	–	0
Cornell		–		5	–	4	–	0
Villanova		–		4	–	4	–	0
Boston College		–		3	–	4	–	0
Brown		–		3	–	4	–	1
Colgate		–		3	–	4	–	1
Princeton		–		2	–	3	–	2
NYU		–		3	–	4	–	0
Pittsburgh		–		3	–	7	–	0
Bucknell		–		2	–	5	–	0
Drexel		–		2	–	5	–	0
Dartmouth		–		1	–	6	–	1
Syracuse		–		1	–	6	–	0
Boston University		–		0	–	5	–	0
CCNY		–		0	–	8	–	0
Rankings from AP Poll

The 1945 Colgate Red Raiders football team was an American football team that represented Colgate University as an independent during the 1945 college football season. In its 17th season under head coach Andrew Kerr, the team compiled a 3–4–1 record and outscored opponents by a total of 128 to 111. The team played its home games at Colgate Athletic Field in Hamilton, New York.

== Schedule ==
Date	Opponent	Site	Result	Attendance	Source
September 29	Rochester	Colgate Athletic Field; Hamilton, NY	W 48–0	3,000	
October 6	at Penn State	New Beaver Field; State College, PA	L 7–27	10,000	
October 13	Lafayette	Colgate Athletic Field; Hamilton, NY	W 47–0		
October 20	at No. 17 Columbia	Baker Field; New York, NY	L 7–31	40,000	
October 27	at No. 15 Holy Cross	Fitton Field; Worcester, MA	L 0–21	25,000	
November 10	at Cornell	Schoellkopf Field; Ithaca, NY (rivalry)	L 6–20	17,000	
November 17	at Syracuse	Archbold Stadium; Syracuse, NY (rivalry)	W 7–6	20,000	
November 24	at Brown	Brown Stadium; Providence, RI	T 6–6	12,000	
Rankings from AP Poll released prior to the game
