= 1945 Boston College Eagles football team =

American college football season

1945 Boston College Eagles football
- Conference: Independent
- Record: 3–4
- Head coach: Moody Sarno (3rd season)
- Captain: George Donelan
- Home stadium: Alumni Field, Fenway Park

1945 Eastern college football independents records
	Conf.			Overall
Team	W	L	T	W		L		T
No. 1 Army		–		9	–	0	–	0
Franklin & Marshall		–		4	–	0	–	1
No. 20 Columbia		–		8	–	1	–	0
Temple		–		7	–	1	–	0
No. 16 Holy Cross		–		8	–	2	–	0
Tufts		–		4	–	1	–	0
No. 8 Penn		–		6	–	2	–	0
Yale		–		6	–	3	–	0
Massachusetts State		–		2	–	1	–	1
Harvard		–		5	–	3	–	0
Penn State		–		5	–	3	–	0
Cornell		–		5	–	4	–	0
Villanova		–		4	–	4	–	0
Boston College		–		3	–	4	–	0
Brown		–		3	–	4	–	1
Colgate		–		3	–	4	–	1
Princeton		–		2	–	3	–	2
NYU		–		3	–	4	–	0
Pittsburgh		–		3	–	7	–	0
Bucknell		–		2	–	5	–	0
Drexel		–		2	–	5	–	0
Dartmouth		–		1	–	6	–	1
Syracuse		–		1	–	6	–	0
Boston University		–		0	–	5	–	0
CCNY		–		0	–	8	–	0
Rankings from AP Poll

The 1945 Boston College Eagles football team represented Boston College as an independent during the 1945 college football season. The Eagles were led by third-year head coach Moody Sarno, and played their home games at Alumni Field in Chestnut Hill, Massachusetts and Fenway Park in Boston. Boston College finished with a record of 3–4. Sarno was relieved of his duties as head coach at the conclusion of the season, as Denny Myers returned from his service in the Navy during World War II. Sarno compiled a record of 11–7–1 as head coach at Boston College.

== Schedule ==
Date	Time	Opponent	Site	Result	Attendance	Source
September 29		Squantum NAS	Alumni Field; Chestnut Hill, MA	W 13–0	5,000	
October 6		at Brown	Brown Stadium; Providence, RI	L 6–51	10,000	
October 12		NYU	Fenway Park; Boston, MA	W 28–0	5,000	
October 27		at Merchant Marine	Kendrick Field; Kings Point, NY	L 20–33	6,000	
November 10	8:30 p.m.	at Villanova	Shibe Park; Philadelphia, PA	L 0–41	4,000	
November 17		Scranton	Fenway Park; Boston, MA	W 12–0	2,000	
November 25		vs. Holy Cross	Fenway Park; Boston, MA (rivalry)	L 0–46	32,457	
All times are in Eastern time
