= 1945 Princeton Tigers football team =

American college football season

1945 Princeton Tigers football
- Conference: Independent
- Record: 2–3–2
- Head coach: Charlie Caldwell (1st season)
- Home stadium: Palmer Stadium

1945 Eastern college football independents records
	Conf.			Overall
Team	W	L	T	W		L		T
No. 1 Army		–		9	–	0	–	0
Franklin & Marshall		–		4	–	0	–	1
No. 20 Columbia		–		8	–	1	–	0
Temple		–		7	–	1	–	0
No. 16 Holy Cross		–		8	–	2	–	0
Tufts		–		4	–	1	–	0
No. 8 Penn		–		6	–	2	–	0
Yale		–		6	–	3	–	0
Massachusetts State		–		2	–	1	–	1
Harvard		–		5	–	3	–	0
Penn State		–		5	–	3	–	0
Cornell		–		5	–	4	–	0
Villanova		–		4	–	4	–	0
Boston College		–		3	–	4	–	0
Brown		–		3	–	4	–	1
Colgate		–		3	–	4	–	1
Princeton		–		2	–	3	–	2
NYU		–		3	–	4	–	0
Pittsburgh		–		3	–	7	–	0
Bucknell		–		2	–	5	–	0
Drexel		–		2	–	5	–	0
Dartmouth		–		1	–	6	–	1
Syracuse		–		1	–	6	–	0
Boston University		–		0	–	5	–	0
CCNY		–		0	–	8	–	0
Rankings from AP Poll

The 1945 Princeton Tigers football team was an American football team that represented Princeton University as an independent during the 1945 college football season. In its first season under head coach Charlie Caldwell, the team compiled a 2–3–2 record and was outscored by a total of 112 to 69. Princeton played its 1945 home games at Palmer Stadium in Princeton, New Jersey.

== Schedule ==
Date	Opponent	Site	Result	Attendance	Source
October 6	Lafayette	Palmer Stadium; Princeton, NJ	T 7–7	4,000	
October 13	at Cornell	Schoellkopf Field; Ithaca, NY	W 14–6	14,000	
October 27	Rutgers	Palmer Stadium; Princeton, NJ (rivalry)	W 14–6	12,000	
November 3	at No. 7 Penn	Franklin Field; Philadelphia, PA (rivalry)	L 0–28	52,000	
November 10	Dartmouth	Palmer Stadium; Princeton, NJ	T 13–13	15,000	
November 17	Columbia	Palmer Stadium; Princeton, NJ	L 7–32	18,000	
November 24	Yale	Palmer Stadium; Princeton, NJ (rivalry)	L 14–20	40,000	
Rankings from AP Poll released prior to the game
