= 1945 Dartmouth Indians football team =

American college football season

1945 Dartmouth Indians football
- Conference: Independent
- Record: 1–6–1
- Head coach: Tuss McLaughry (3rd season)
- Home stadium: Memorial Field

1945 Eastern college football independents records
	Conf.			Overall
Team	W	L	T	W		L		T
No. 1 Army		–		9	–	0	–	0
Franklin & Marshall		–		4	–	0	–	1
No. 20 Columbia		–		8	–	1	–	0
Temple		–		7	–	1	–	0
No. 16 Holy Cross		–		8	–	2	–	0
Tufts		–		4	–	1	–	0
No. 8 Penn		–		6	–	2	–	0
Yale		–		6	–	3	–	0
Massachusetts State		–		2	–	1	–	1
Harvard		–		5	–	3	–	0
Penn State		–		5	–	3	–	0
Cornell		–		5	–	4	–	0
Villanova		–		4	–	4	–	0
Boston College		–		3	–	4	–	0
Brown		–		3	–	4	–	1
Colgate		–		3	–	4	–	1
Princeton		–		2	–	3	–	2
NYU		–		3	–	4	–	0
Pittsburgh		–		3	–	7	–	0
Bucknell		–		2	–	5	–	0
Drexel		–		2	–	5	–	0
Dartmouth		–		1	–	6	–	1
Syracuse		–		1	–	6	–	0
Boston University		–		0	–	5	–	0
CCNY		–		0	–	8	–	0
Rankings from AP Poll

The 1945 Dartmouth Indians football team represented Dartmouth College during the 1945 college football season.

== Schedule ==
Date	Opponent	Site	Result	Attendance	Source
September 29	Holy Cross	Memorial Field; Hanover, NH	L 6–13	8,000	
October 6	Penn	Franklin Field; Philadelphia, PA	L 0–12	45,000	
October 13	No. 3 Notre Dame	Notre Dame Stadium; South Bend, IN	L 0–34	45,000	
October 27	Syracuse	Archbold Stadium; Syracuse, NY	W 8–0	10,000	
November 3	Yale	Yale Bowl; New Haven, CT	L 0–6	45,000	
November 10	Princeton	Palmer Stadium; Princeton, NJ	T 13–13	15,000	
November 17	Cornell	Memorial Field; Hanover, NH	L 13–20	12,000	
November 24	Columbia	Baker Field; New York, NY	L 0–21	30,000	
Rankings from AP Poll released prior to the game
