= 1945 Massachusetts State Aggies football team =

American college football season

1945 Massachusetts State Aggies football
- Conference: Independent
- Record: 2–1–1
- Head coach: Thomas Eck (1st season)
- Home stadium: Alumni Field

1945 Eastern college football independents records
	Conf.			Overall
Team	W	L	T	W		L		T
No. 1 Army		–		9	–	0	–	0
Franklin & Marshall		–		4	–	0	–	1
No. 20 Columbia		–		8	–	1	–	0
Temple		–		7	–	1	–	0
No. 16 Holy Cross		–		8	–	2	–	0
Tufts		–		4	–	1	–	0
No. 8 Penn		–		6	–	2	–	0
Yale		–		6	–	3	–	0
Massachusetts State		–		2	–	1	–	1
Harvard		–		5	–	3	–	0
Penn State		–		5	–	3	–	0
Cornell		–		5	–	4	–	0
Villanova		–		4	–	4	–	0
Boston College		–		3	–	4	–	0
Brown		–		3	–	4	–	1
Colgate		–		3	–	4	–	1
Princeton		–		2	–	3	–	2
NYU		–		3	–	4	–	0
Pittsburgh		–		3	–	7	–	0
Bucknell		–		2	–	5	–	0
Drexel		–		2	–	5	–	0
Dartmouth		–		1	–	6	–	1
Syracuse		–		1	–	6	–	0
Boston University		–		0	–	5	–	0
CCNY		–		0	–	8	–	0
Rankings from AP Poll

The 1945 Massachusetts State Aggies football team represented Massachusetts State College in the 1945 college football season. The team was coached by Thomas Eck and played its home games at Alumni Field in Amherst, Massachusetts. The 1945 season was the team's first since 1942, as they had disbanded during World War II. Mass State finished the season with a record of 2–1–1.

== Schedule ==
Note: All scores/opponents sourced from Carlson 1988.

Date	Opponent	Site	Result
October 20	Brooklyn	Alumni Field; Amherst, MA	L 7–13
October 27	at Maine	Alumni Field; Orono, ME	W 6–0
November 3	Maine	Alumni Field; Amherst, MA	W 14–13
November 10	at Amherst	Pratt Field; Amherst, MA	T 6–6
