= 1945 Army Cadets football team =

American college football season

1945 Army Cadets football

AP Poll national champion Eastern champion
- Conference: Independent

Ranking
- AP: No. 1
- Record: 9–0
- Head coach: Earl Blaik (5th season)
- Captain: John Green
- Home stadium: Michie Stadium

1945 Eastern college football independents records
| | Conf. | | | Overall |
| Team | W | L | T | W | | L | | T |
|---|---|---|---|---|---|---|---|---|
| No. 1 Army | | – | | 9 | – | 0 | – | 0 |
| Franklin & Marshall | | – | | 4 | – | 0 | – | 1 |
| No. 20 Columbia | | – | | 8 | – | 1 | – | 0 |
| Temple | | – | | 7 | – | 1 | – | 0 |
| No. 16 Holy Cross | | – | | 8 | – | 2 | – | 0 |
| Tufts | | – | | 4 | – | 1 | – | 0 |
| No. 8 Penn | | – | | 6 | – | 2 | – | 0 |
| Yale | | – | | 6 | – | 3 | – | 0 |
| Massachusetts State | | – | | 2 | – | 1 | – | 1 |
| Harvard | | – | | 5 | – | 3 | – | 0 |
| Penn State | | – | | 5 | – | 3 | – | 0 |
| Cornell | | – | | 5 | – | 4 | – | 0 |
| Villanova | | – | | 4 | – | 4 | – | 0 |
| Boston College | | – | | 3 | – | 4 | – | 0 |
| Brown | | – | | 3 | – | 4 | – | 1 |
| Colgate | | – | | 3 | – | 4 | – | 1 |
| Princeton | | – | | 2 | – | 3 | – | 2 |
| NYU | | – | | 3 | – | 4 | – | 0 |
| Pittsburgh | | – | | 3 | – | 7 | – | 0 |
| Bucknell | | – | | 2 | – | 5 | – | 0 |
| Drexel | | – | | 2 | – | 5 | – | 0 |
| Dartmouth | | – | | 1 | – | 6 | – | 1 |
| Syracuse | | – | | 1 | – | 6 | – | 0 |
| Boston University | | – | | 0 | – | 5 | – | 0 |
| CCNY | | – | | 0 | – | 8 | – | 0 |
Rankings from AP Poll

The 1945 Army Cadets football team was an American football team that represented the United States Military Academy as an independent during the 1945 college football season. In their fifth season under head coach Earl Blaik, the Cadets compiled a 9–0 record, shut out five of nine opponents (including a 48–0 victory over No. 2 Notre Dame and a 61–0 victory over No. 6 Penn), and outscored all opponents by a total of 412 to 46. Army's 1945 season was part of a 32-game undefeated streak that included the entire 1944, 1945, and 1946 seasons.

In the final AP poll released on December 2, Army was unanimously ranked No. 1 nationally with 1,160 points, more than 200 points ahead of No. 2 Navy. The Cadets repeated as winners of the Dr. Henry L. Williams trophy for the AP national championship. Army also won the Lambert Trophy as the best football team in the east.

All eight other contemporary NCAA-designated major selectors also recognized Army as the 1945 national champion, including the Boand System, Dunkel System, DeVold System, Helms Athletic Foundation, Houlgate System, Litkenhous Ratings, Poling System, and Williamson System. Army also garnered five retrospective selections by later major selectors Berryman (QPRS), Billingsley Report, College Football Researchers Association, and Sagarin Ratings; the National Championship Foundation selected them as co-champions with Alabama.

The team led the nation with an average of 462.7 yards of total offense per game, including 359.8 rushing yards per game. The offense was led by backs Doc Blanchard and Glenn Davis. Blanchard scored 114 points in 1945 and received both the Heisman Trophy and the Maxwell Award as the best player in college football. Davis rushed for 944 yards and led the nation with an average of 11.51 rushing yards per carry.

Four Army players were consensus first-team picks on the 1945 All-America college football team: Blanchard; Davis; tackle Tex Coulter; and guard John Green. In a departure from normal practice, the Newspaper Enterprise Association (NEA) named all eleven Army starters as its All-American team for 1945. Other notable players included quarterback Arnold Tucker (NEA) and end Hank Foldberg.

The undefeated 1945 Army team was one of the strongest of all time, as during World War II, loose player transfer rules allowed service academies to assemble many of the nation's best players.

== Schedule ==
| Date | Opponent | Rank | Site | Result | Attendance | Source |
|---|---|---|---|---|---|---|
| September 29 | Personnel Distribution Command | | Michie Stadium; West Point, NY | W 32–0 | 9,000 | |
| October 6 | Wake Forest | | Michie Stadium; West Point, NY | W 54–0 | 10,000 | |
| October 13 | vs. No. 9 Michigan | No. 1 | Yankee Stadium; Bronx, NY | W 28–7 | 70,000 | |
| October 20 | Melville PT Boats | No. 1 | Michie Stadium; West Point, NY | W 55–13 | | |
| October 27 | vs. No. 19 Duke | No. 1 | Polo Grounds; New York, NY | W 48–13 | 42,287 | |
| November 3 | Villanova | No. 1 | Michie Stadium; West Point, NY | W 54–0 | 12,000 | |
| November 10 | vs. No. 2 Notre Dame | No. 1 | Yankee Stadium; Bronx, NY (rivalry) | W 48–0 | 74,621 | |
| November 17 | at No. 6 Penn | No. 1 | Franklin Field; Philadelphia, PA | W 61–0 | 73,000 | |
| December 1 | vs. No. 2 Navy | No. 1 | Philadelphia Municipal Stadium; Philadelphia, PA (Army–Navy Game) | W 32–13 | 102,000 | |
Rankings from AP Poll released prior to the game

== Rankings ==
Army was the wire-to-wire No. 1 in the season's AP poll and won the Dr. Henry L. Williams Trophy.

Ranking movements Legend: ( ) = First-place votes
| | Week | | | | | | | | |
| Poll | 1 | 2 | 3 | 4 | 5 | 6 | 7 | 8 | Final |
|---|---|---|---|---|---|---|---|---|---|
| AP | 1 (86) | 1 (90) | 1 (101) | 1 (91) | 1 (86) | 1 (91) | 1 (81) | 1 (80) | 1 (116) |

== Personnel ==
=== Players ===
- Shelton Biles, guard, Kingsport, Tennessee
- Doc Blanchard (College Football Hall of Fame), fullback, Bishopville, South Carolina, 6', 208 pounds
- Roland Catarinella, guard
- Bobby Chabot
- Tex Coulter, tackle, San Antonio, Texas, 6'3", 220 pounds
- Glenn Davis (College Football Hall of Fame), Claremont, California, 5'9", 170 pounds
- Hank Foldberg, end, Dallas, Texas, 6'1", 195 pounds
- Herschel E. Fuson, Middlesboro, Kentucky, 6'1", 215 pounds
- Arthur L. Gerometta, guard, Gary, Indiana, 5'10", 190 pounds
- John Green (College Football Hall of Fame), guard and captain, Shelbyville, Kentucky, 5'8-1/2", 190 pounds
- Shorty McWilliams, wingback, Meridan, Mississippi, 5'11", 175 pounds
- Albert M. Nemetz, tackle, Prince George, Virginia, 6', 190 pounds
- Dick Pitzer, end, Connellsville, Pennsylvania, 6'1", 195 pounds
- Barney Poole (College Football Hall of Fame), end, Gloster, Mississippi
- Arnold Tucker (College Football Hall of Fame), quarterback, Miami, Florida, 5'9", 175 pounds

=== Coaches ===
- Earl Blaik (College Football Hall of Fame), head coach
- Paul Amen, assistant coach
- Andy Gustafson (College Football Hall of Fame), backfield coach
- Herman Hickman (College Football Hall of Fame), line coach
- Stu Holcomb, assistant coach
- Harvey Jablonsky (College Football Hall of Fame), assistant coach
- Bill Bevan, trainer

== Awards and honors ==
=== Team ===
- Dr. Henry L. Williams trophy, AP poll national champions
- Litkenhous trophy, national champions
- Lambert Trophy, best football team in the East

=== Individual ===
- Doc Blanchard, Heisman Trophy
- Doc Blanchard, Maxwell Award
- Doc Blanchard, James E. Sullivan Award
