= 1945 Penn Quakers football team =

American college football season

1945 Penn Quakers football
- Conference: Independent

Ranking
- AP: No. 8
- Record: 6–2
- Head coach: George Munger (8th season)
- Home stadium: Franklin Field

1945 Eastern college football independents records
	Conf.			Overall
Team	W	L	T	W		L		T
No. 1 Army		–		9	–	0	–	0
Franklin & Marshall		–		4	–	0	–	1
No. 20 Columbia		–		8	–	1	–	0
Temple		–		7	–	1	–	0
No. 16 Holy Cross		–		8	–	2	–	0
Tufts		–		4	–	1	–	0
No. 8 Penn		–		6	–	2	–	0
Yale		–		6	–	3	–	0
Massachusetts State		–		2	–	1	–	1
Harvard		–		5	–	3	–	0
Penn State		–		5	–	3	–	0
Cornell		–		5	–	4	–	0
Villanova		–		4	–	4	–	0
Boston College		–		3	–	4	–	0
Brown		–		3	–	4	–	1
Colgate		–		3	–	4	–	1
Princeton		–		2	–	3	–	2
NYU		–		3	–	4	–	0
Pittsburgh		–		3	–	7	–	0
Bucknell		–		2	–	5	–	0
Drexel		–		2	–	5	–	0
Dartmouth		–		1	–	6	–	1
Syracuse		–		1	–	6	–	0
Boston University		–		0	–	5	–	0
CCNY		–		0	–	8	–	0
Rankings from AP Poll

The 1945 Penn Quakers football team was an American football team that represented the University of Pennsylvania as an independent during the 1945 college football season. In its eighth season under head coach George Munger, the team compiled a 6–2 record, was ranked No. 8 in the final AP Poll, and outscored opponents by a total of 237 to 88. The team played its home games at Franklin Field in Philadelphia.

== Schedule ==
Date	Opponent	Rank	Site	Result	Attendance	Source
September 29	Brown		Franklin Field; Philadelphia, PA	W 50–0	51,000	
October 6	Dartmouth		Franklin Field; Philadelphia, PA	W 12–0	45,000	
October 13	North Carolina	No. 11	Franklin Field; Philadelphia, PA	W 49–0	53,000	
October 27	No. 3 Navy	No. 7	Franklin Field; Philadelphia, PA	L 7–14	73,000	
November 3	Princeton	No. 7	Franklin Field; Philadelphia, PA (rivalry)	W 28–0	52,000	
November 10	No. 10 Columbia	No. 9	Franklin Field; Philadelphia, PA	W 32–7	63,000	
November 17	No. 1 Army	No. 6	Franklin Field; Philadelphia, PA	L 0–61	73,000	
November 24	Cornell	No. 11	Franklin Field; Philadelphia, PA (rivalry)	W 59–6	67,000	
Rankings from AP Poll released prior to the game

== Rankings ==
Ranking movements Legend: ██ Increase in ranking ██ Decrease in ranking
	Week								
Poll	1	2	3	4	5	6	7	8	Final
AP	11	7	7	7	9	6	11	8	8
