= 1945 Holy Cross Crusaders football team =

American college football season

1945 Holy Cross Crusaders football

Orange Bowl, L 6–13 vs. Miami (FL)
- Conference: Independent

Ranking
- AP: No. 16
- Record: 8–2
- Head coach: Ox DaGrosa (1st season)
- Home stadium: Fitton Field

1945 Eastern college football independents records
	Conf.			Overall
Team	W	L	T	W		L		T
No. 1 Army		–		9	–	0	–	0
Franklin & Marshall		–		4	–	0	–	1
No. 20 Columbia		–		8	–	1	–	0
Temple		–		7	–	1	–	0
No. 16 Holy Cross		–		8	–	2	–	0
Tufts		–		4	–	1	–	0
No. 8 Penn		–		6	–	2	–	0
Yale		–		6	–	3	–	0
Massachusetts State		–		2	–	1	–	1
Harvard		–		5	–	3	–	0
Penn State		–		5	–	3	–	0
Cornell		–		5	–	4	–	0
Villanova		–		4	–	4	–	0
Boston College		–		3	–	4	–	0
Brown		–		3	–	4	–	1
Colgate		–		3	–	4	–	1
Princeton		–		2	–	3	–	2
NYU		–		3	–	4	–	0
Pittsburgh		–		3	–	7	–	0
Bucknell		–		2	–	5	–	0
Drexel		–		2	–	5	–	0
Dartmouth		–		1	–	6	–	1
Syracuse		–		1	–	6	–	0
Boston University		–		0	–	5	–	0
CCNY		–		0	–	8	–	0
Rankings from AP Poll

The 1945 Holy Cross Crusaders football team represented the College of the Holy Cross in the 1945 college football season. The Crusaders were led by first-year head coach John "Ox" DaGrosa and played their home games at Fitton Field in Worcester, Massachusetts. They finished the regular season with a record of 8–1, ranked 16th in the AP Poll. Holy Cross was invited to the Orange Bowl, played on New Year's Day, where they lost to the University of Miami, 6–13. This was the first and only bowl game in Holy Cross's history.

== Schedule ==
Date	Opponent	Rank	Site	Result	Attendance	Source
September 29	at Dartmouth		Memorial Field; Hanover, NH	W 13–6	8,000	
October 6	at Yale		Yale Bowl; New Haven, CT	W 21–0	25,000	
October 14	Villanova	No. 12	Fitton Field; Worcester, MA	W 26–7	26,000	
October 20	at Brown	No. 19	Brown Stadium; Providence, RI	W 25–0	25,000	
October 27	Colgate	No. 15	Fitton Field; Worcester, MA	W 21–0	25,000	
November 4	New London Sub Base	No. 11	Fitton Field; Worcester, MA	W 20–6	10,000	
November 11	Coast Guard	No. 13	Fitton Field; Worcester, MA	W 39–6	6,000	
November 17	Temple	No. 10	Fitton Field; Worcester, MA	L 6–14	25,000	
November 25	vs. Boston College		Fenway Park; Boston, MA (rivalry)	W 46–0	32,457	
January 1	at Miami (FL)	No. 16	Burdine Stadium; Miami, FL (Orange Bowl)	L 6–13	38,000	
Rankings from AP Poll released prior to the game; Source:

== Rankings ==
Ranking movements Legend: ██ Increase in ranking ██ Decrease in ranking — = Not ranked
	Week								
Poll	1	2	3	4	5	6	7	8	Final
AP	12	19	15	11	13	10	—	13	16
