= 1945 Lafayette Leopards football team =

American football club

1945 Lafayette Leopards football
- Conference: Middle Three Conference
- Record: 1–7–1 (1–1 Middle Three)
- Head coach: Ben Wolfson (3rd season)
- Captain: Game captains
- Home stadium: Fisher Field

1945 Middle Three Conference football standings
	Conf.					Overall
Team	W		L		T	W		L		T
Rutgers $	2	–	0	–	0	5	–	2	–	0
Lafayette	1	–	1	–	0	1	–	7	–	1
Lehigh	0	–	2	–	0	2	–	4	–	0
$ – Conference champion

The 1945 Lafayette Leopards football team was an American football team that represented Lafayette College in the Middle Three Conference during the 1945 college football season. In its third and final season under head coach Ben Wolfson, the team compiled a 1–7–1 record. The team was led by game captains and played home games at Fisher Field in Easton, Pennsylvania.

== Schedule ==
Date	Opponent	Site	Result	Attendance	Source
September 29	at Columbia*	Baker Field; New York, NY	L 14–40	10,000	
October 6	at Princeton*	Palmer Stadium; Princeton, NJ	T 7–7	4,000	
October 13	at Colgate*	Colgate Athletic Field; Hamilton, NY	L 0–47		
October 20	Merchant Marine*	Fisher Field; Easton, PA	L 7–26	6,000	
October 27	Bucknell*	Fisher Field; Easton, PA	L 2–26	3,000	
November 3	at Temple*	Temple Stadium; Philadelphia, PA	L 0–20	12,000	
November 10	Rutgers	Fisher Field; Easton, PA	L 14–32	2,500	
November 17	Atlantic City NAS*	Fisher Field; Easton, PA	L 7–12	5,000	
November 24	at Lehigh	Taylor Stadium; Bethlethem, PA (rivalry)	W 7–0	8,000	
*Non-conference game
