= 1945 Penn State Nittany Lions football team =

American college football season

1945 Penn State Nittany Lions football
- Conference: Independent
- Record: 5–3
- Head coach: Bob Higgins (16th season)
- Captain: None
- Home stadium: New Beaver Field

1945 Eastern college football independents records
	Conf.			Overall
Team	W	L	T	W		L		T
No. 1 Army		–		9	–	0	–	0
Franklin & Marshall		–		4	–	0	–	1
No. 20 Columbia		–		8	–	1	–	0
Temple		–		7	–	1	–	0
No. 16 Holy Cross		–		8	–	2	–	0
Tufts		–		4	–	1	–	0
No. 8 Penn		–		6	–	2	–	0
Yale		–		6	–	3	–	0
Massachusetts State		–		2	–	1	–	1
Harvard		–		5	–	3	–	0
Penn State		–		5	–	3	–	0
Cornell		–		5	–	4	–	0
Villanova		–		4	–	4	–	0
Boston College		–		3	–	4	–	0
Brown		–		3	–	4	–	1
Colgate		–		3	–	4	–	1
Princeton		–		2	–	3	–	2
NYU		–		3	–	4	–	0
Pittsburgh		–		3	–	7	–	0
Bucknell		–		2	–	5	–	0
Drexel		–		2	–	5	–	0
Dartmouth		–		1	–	6	–	1
Syracuse		–		1	–	6	–	0
Boston University		–		0	–	5	–	0
CCNY		–		0	–	8	–	0
Rankings from AP Poll

The 1945 Penn State Nittany Lions football team represented the Pennsylvania State University as an independent during the 1945 college football season. The team was coached by Bob Higgins and played its home games in New Beaver Field in State College, Pennsylvania.

== Schedule ==
Date	Opponent	Rank	Site	Result	Attendance	Source
September 29	Muhlenberg		New Beaver Field; State College, PA	W 47–7	5,048	
October 6	Colgate^{†}		New Beaver Field; State College, PA	W 27–7	9,619	
October 13	at No. 2 Navy		Thompson Stadium; Annapolis, MD	L 0–28	16,148	
October 20	at Bucknell		Memorial Stadium; Lewisburg, PA	W 46–7	5,319–7,500	
November 3	Syracuse		New Beaver Field; State College, PA (rivalry)	W 26–0	8,505	
November 10	Temple		New Beaver Field; State College, PA	W 27–0	13,135	
November 17	at Michigan State	No. 12	Spartan Stadium; East Lansing, MI (rivalry)	L 0–33		
November 24	at Pittsburgh		Pitt Stadium; Pittsburgh, PA (rivalry)	L 0–7	11,354	
^{†}Homecoming; Rankings from AP Poll released prior to the game

== Rankings ==
Ranking movements Legend: ██ Increase in ranking ██ Decrease in ranking — = Not ranked
	Week								
Poll	1	2	3	4	5	6	7	8	Final
AP	—	—	—	—	—	12	—	—	—
