= 1945 Lehigh Engineers football team =

American college football season

1945 Lehigh Engineers football
- Conference: Middle Three Conference
- Record: 2–4 (0–2 Middle Three)
- Head coach: Leo Prendergast (3rd season)
- Captains: A. Granese; C. Pearsall
- Home stadium: Taylor Stadium

1945 Middle Three Conference football standings
| | Conf. | | | | | Overall |
| Team | W | | L | | T | W | | L | | T |
|---|---|---|---|---|---|---|---|---|---|---|
| Rutgers $ | 2 | – | 0 | – | 0 | 5 | – | 2 | – | 0 |
| Lafayette | 1 | – | 1 | – | 0 | 1 | – | 7 | – | 1 |
| Lehigh | 0 | – | 2 | – | 0 | 2 | – | 4 | – | 0 |
$ – Conference champion

The 1945 Lehigh Engineers football team was an American football team that represented Lehigh University during the 1945 college football season. In its third and final season under head coach Leo Prendergast, the team compiled a 2–4 record, and lost both games against its Middle Three Conference rivals. Lehigh played home games at Taylor Stadium in Bethlehem, Pennsylvania.

== Schedule ==
| Date | Opponent | Site | Result | Attendance | Source |
|---|---|---|---|---|---|
| October 20 | Muhlenberg* | Taylor Stadium; Bethlehem, PA | W 6–0 | 9,000 | |
| October 27 | Connecticut* | Taylor Stadium; Bethlehem, PA | L 6–33 | 5,000 | |
| November 3 | at Rutgers | Rutgers Stadium; Piscataway, NJ | L 0–25 | 5,500 | |
| November 10 | at NYU* | Ohio Field; Bronx, NY | L 0–19 | 4,000 | |
| November 17 | at Drexel* | Drexel Field; Philadelphia, PA | W 14–9 | | |
| November 24 | Lafayette | Taylor Stadium; Bethlehem, PA (rivalry) | L 0–7 | 8,000 | |
*Non-conference game
