= 1945 Drexel Dragons football team =

American college football season

1945 Drexel Dragons football
- Conference: Independent
- Record: 2–5
- Head coach: Maury McMains (2nd season)
- Captains: Dick Dowd; John Christie
- Home stadium: Drexel Field

1945 Eastern college football independents records
	Conf.			Overall
Team	W	L	T	W		L		T
No. 1 Army		–		9	–	0	–	0
Franklin & Marshall		–		4	–	0	–	1
No. 20 Columbia		–		8	–	1	–	0
Temple		–		7	–	1	–	0
No. 16 Holy Cross		–		8	–	2	–	0
Tufts		–		4	–	1	–	0
No. 8 Penn		–		6	–	2	–	0
Yale		–		6	–	3	–	0
Massachusetts State		–		2	–	1	–	1
Harvard		–		5	–	3	–	0
Penn State		–		5	–	3	–	0
Cornell		–		5	–	4	–	0
Villanova		–		4	–	4	–	0
Boston College		–		3	–	4	–	0
Brown		–		3	–	4	–	1
Colgate		–		3	–	4	–	1
Princeton		–		2	–	3	–	2
NYU		–		3	–	4	–	0
Pittsburgh		–		3	–	7	–	0
Bucknell		–		2	–	5	–	0
Drexel		–		2	–	5	–	0
Dartmouth		–		1	–	6	–	1
Syracuse		–		1	–	6	–	0
Boston University		–		0	–	5	–	0
CCNY		–		0	–	8	–	0
Rankings from AP Poll

1945 Drexel Dragons football team was head coached by Maury McMains.

On Friday October 26, Drexel played in its program's first night football game against West Chester.

== Schedule ==
Date	Time	Opponent	Site	Result	Attendance	Source
October 6		at West Virginia	Mountaineer Field; Morgantown, WV	L 0–42		
October 13		CCNY	Drexel Field; Philadelphia, PA	W 19–7	1,600	
October 20		Haverford		W 19–0		
October 26	8:00 pm	at West Chester	Wayne Field; West Chester, PA	L 0–6		
November 3		Delaware	Drexel Field; Philadelphia, PA	L 12–26		
November 10		at Johns Hopkins	Homewood Field; Baltimore, MD	L 13–26		
November 17	2:00 pm	Lehigh^{†}	Drexel Field; Philadelphia, PA	L 9–14		
^{†}Homecoming; All times are in Eastern time

== Roster ==
1945 Drexel Dragons football team roster
Players
Coaches
Offense

Pos.	#	Name	Class
QB		Dick Dowd (C)
HB		Bill Smith
HB		Geiger
FB		Cullen
TE		Scott
OT		Desiderio
G		Dick Yasky
C		VanDoren
G		Haines
OT		George Lechler
TE		Bahles
FB		John Christie
TE		Drummond	Sr
[[American football positions|]]		Art Kees
TE		Johnny Liggins
FB		Bob Heffner
C		Handschumaker

Defense

Pos.	#	Name	Class

Special teams

Pos.	#	Name	Class

Head coach

- Maury McMains (McDaniel)

Coordinators/assistant coaches

Legend

- (C) Team captain
- (S) Suspended
- (I) Ineligible
- Injured
- Redshirt
