= 1945 Columbia Lions football team =

American college football season

1945 Columbia Lions football
- Conference: Independent

Ranking
- AP: No. 20
- Record: 8–1
- Head coach: Lou Little (16th season)
- Offensive scheme: Single-wing
- Home stadium: Baker Field

1945 Eastern college football independents records
	Conf.			Overall
Team	W	L	T	W		L		T
No. 1 Army		–		9	–	0	–	0
Franklin & Marshall		–		4	–	0	–	1
No. 20 Columbia		–		8	–	1	–	0
Temple		–		7	–	1	–	0
No. 16 Holy Cross		–		8	–	2	–	0
Tufts		–		4	–	1	–	0
No. 8 Penn		–		6	–	2	–	0
Yale		–		6	–	3	–	0
Massachusetts State		–		2	–	1	–	1
Harvard		–		5	–	3	–	0
Penn State		–		5	–	3	–	0
Cornell		–		5	–	4	–	0
Villanova		–		4	–	4	–	0
Boston College		–		3	–	4	–	0
Brown		–		3	–	4	–	1
Colgate		–		3	–	4	–	1
Princeton		–		2	–	3	–	2
NYU		–		3	–	4	–	0
Pittsburgh		–		3	–	7	–	0
Bucknell		–		2	–	5	–	0
Drexel		–		2	–	5	–	0
Dartmouth		–		1	–	6	–	1
Syracuse		–		1	–	6	–	0
Boston University		–		0	–	5	–	0
CCNY		–		0	–	8	–	0
Rankings from AP Poll

The 1945 Columbia Lions football team was an American football team that represented the Columbia University during the 1945 college football season. In their 16th season under head coach Lou Little, the Lions compiled an 8–1 record, were ranked No. 20 in the final AP Poll, and outscored all opponents by a combined total of 251 to 105. The Lions' lone setback was a 32–7 loss to Penn.

== Schedule ==
Date	Opponent	Rank	Site	Result	Attendance	Source
September 29	Lafayette		Baker Field; New York, NY	W 40–14	10,000	
October 6	Syracuse		Baker Field; New York, NY	W 32–0	8,000	
October 13	Yale		Baker Field; New York, NY	W 27–13	30,000	
October 20	Colgate	No. 17	Baker Field; New York, NY	W 31–7	40,000	
October 27	Brown	No. 11	Baker Field; New York, NY	W 27–6	12,000	
November 3	Cornell	No. 12	Baker Field; New York, NY (rivalry)	W 34–26	35,000	
November 10	at No. 9 Penn	No. 10	Franklin Field; Philadelphia	L 7–32	63,000	
November 17	at Princeton		Palmer Stadium; Princeton, NJ	W 32–7	18,000	
November 24	Dartmouth		Baker Field; New York, NY	W 21–0	30,000	
Rankings from AP Poll released prior to the game

== Rankings ==
Ranking movements Legend: ██ Increase in ranking ██ Decrease in ranking — = Not ranked
	Week								
Poll	1	2	3	4	5	6	7	8	Final
AP	—	17	11	12	10	—	—	19	20
