= Walt Schlinkman =

American gridiron football player (1922–1994)

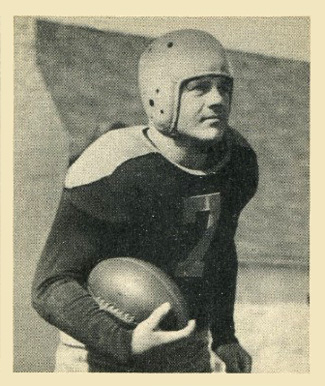

No. 7
- Position: Fullback

Personal information
- Born: May 2, 1922; Channing, Texas, U.S.
- Died: October 5, 1994 (aged 72); Weimar, Texas, U.S.
- Listed height: 5 ft 8 in (1.73 m)
- Listed weight: 180 lb (82 kg)

Career information
- High school: Dumas (Dumas, Texas)
- College: Texas Tech
- NFL draft: 1945: 1st round, 11th overall pick

Career history

Playing
- Green Bay Packers (1946–1949)

Coaching
- Lake Forest (1951–1953) Assistant; Marquette (1954) Assistant; Columbia (1955–1956) Assistant; BC Lions (1957) Backfield; Washington (1958) Assistant; Chicago Cardinals (1959) Offensive backfield; Houston Oilers (1960–1963) Assistant; St. Louis Cardinals (1964) Assistant; Houston Oilers (1965–1971) Assistant

Awards and highlights
- Second-team All-American (1945); First-team Little All-American (1945)

Career NFL statistics
- Rushing yards: 1,455
- Rushing average: 4
- Receptions: 3
- Receiving yards: –1
- Total Touchdowns: 8
- Stats at Pro Football Reference

Walter Gaye Schlinkman (Pronounced: SCHLEENK-mun) (May 2, 1922 – October 5, 1994) was an American professional football player and coach. He played professionally as a fullback in the National Football League (NFL) for the Green Bay Packers. The Packers used the 11th pick in the first round of the 1945 NFL draft to sign Schlinkman out of Texas Technological College (now known as Texas Tech University). Schlinkman played in 46 games over four seasons with the Packers before he retired from playing in 1949.

Schlinkman began his coaching career as an assistant as Lake Forest College in 1951. He was hired by Marquette University as an assistant in 1954. After two years as an assistant at Columbia University, Schlinkman was hired in 1957 as backfield coach by the BC Lions of the Western Interprovincial Football Union, a forerunner of the Canadian Football League West Division. In 1958, he joined the staff of Jim Owens at the University of Washington. Schlinkman went on to a long career in the Houston Oilers organization.
