= 1945 Little All-America college football team =

American college football all-star team

The 1945 Little All-America college football team is composed of college football players from small colleges and universities who were selected by the Associated Press (AP) as the best players at each position. The selection of Little All-America teams was interrupted by World War II; the 1945 selections were the first since 1942. Two linemen from the Orange Bowl champion 1945 Miami Hurricanes football team made the team. Due to Miami's postwar expansion plans, the AP opined that the school would likely not qualify in the future for Little All-America consideration.

== Selections ==
Position	Player	Team
B	Carroll Bowen	Catawba
B	Walt Trojanowski	Connecticut
B	James Boswell	Oberlin
B	Walt Schlinkman	Texas Tech
E	Theodore Molitor	St. Thomas (MN)
E	Robert Eyer	Lock Haven Teachers
T	Thomas Stewart	Chattanooga
T	Robert Kirkman	Dakota Wesleyan
G	Andy Kavaounis	Presbyterian
G	Ed Cameron	Miami (FL)
C	William Levett	Miami (FL)

== See also ==
- 1945 College Football All-America Team
