= Linwood Sexton =

American football player (1926–2017)

Profile
- Position: Halfback

Personal information
- Born: April 16, 1926; Wichita, Kansas
- Died: March 29, 2017 (aged 90)
- Listed height: 6 ft 0 in (1.83 m)
- Listed weight: 180 lb (82 kg)

Career information
- High school: Wichita (KS) East
- College: Wichita State

Career history
- Los Angeles Dons (1948)
- Stats at Pro Football Reference

Linwood Bookard "Lin" Sexton (April 16, 1926 – March 29, 2017) was an American football halfback who played for the Los Angeles Dons and played college football at Wichita State University from 1944 to 1948. He having previously attended East High School in Wichita where he was part of the Wichita East High School Aces track team who won two KU Relays championships, two state team titles including an undefeated track season in 1944. That year, he won the state meet 100 yard dash with a time of 10.4, the 220 with a time of 22.5 and anchored the winning 880–yard relay.

He was one of the first African-American college football players to play for Wichita State, and in the Missouri Valley Conference, and thus was barred from participating in certain games and was forced to make separate travel arrangements due to the segregation policies in place at the time. He was named to the All-Conference team in 1945, 1946, and 1947, the first African-American player to have accomplished the feat. The Linwood Sexton Endowed Scholarship from his alma mater, Wichita State, is named in his honor. His number 66 was retired before he graduated and he was inducted into the Wichita State Hall of Fame in 1979. In 2011, he was inducted into the Missouri Valley Conference Athletics Hall of Fame. He is also a member of the Kansas Sports Hall of Fame (inducted 2001). Sexton died March 29, 2017.
