= Jerry Niles =

American football player (1919–1950)

- Niles, circa 1945

No. 22, 46
- Position: Quarterback

Personal information
- Born: May 1, 1919; East Moline, Illinois, U.S.
- Died: December 27, 1950 (aged 31); Sumter, South Carolina, U.S.
- Listed height: 6 ft 1 in (1.85 m)
- Listed weight: 195 lb (88 kg)

Career information
- High school: Clinton (Clinton, Iowa)
- College: Iowa

Career history
- Jersey Giants (1946); New York Giants (1947)

Awards and highlights
- ACFL champion (1946)
- Stats at Pro Football Reference

Jerry Maynard Niles Jr. (May 1, 1919 – December 27, 1950) was an American professional football player who was a quarterback for the New York Giants of the National Football League (NFL). He played college football for the Iowa Hawkeyes.

== Early life ==
Jerry Maynard Niles Jr. was born on May 1, 1919, in East Moline, Illinois. He played high school football at Clinton High School in Clinton, Iowa.

== College career ==
Niles enrolled at the University of Iowa to play college football for the Hawkeyes. He was on the freshman team in 1937. He played fullback for the varsity team in 1938, and led the team in rushing yards with 51 carries for 176 yards and two touchdown. Niles also led the Hawkeyes in scoring that year with 16 points (two touchdowns and four extra points). In March 1939, Iowa head coach Eddie Anderson said that Niles would likely play center during the 1939 season. Before the start of the 1939 season, Niles left the team for an unclear reason.

Niles was on the freshman team at Saint Louis University in 1940. He also played hockey for the Billikens. He then served in the United States Navy during World War II as a dive bomber and company commander. Niles saw action in the Pacific Theater.

In 1945, Niles returned to the University of Iowa to captain, and quarterback, the Hawkeyes football team. He completed 63 of 177 passes for 889 yards and seven touchdowns. His 889 yards and 177 attempts were both school records while his 63 completions were the third most in the country that year.

== Professional career ==
Niles signed with the New York Giants of the National Football League on June 15, 1946. He played for the Giants' farm team, the Jersey Giants of the Atlantic Coast Football League, in 1946 as a left halfback. He appeared in five games, starting three, during the 1946 season, completing 16 of 41 passes (39.0%) for 239 yards, two touchdowns, and four interceptions. He scored 20 points overall during the 1946 season (three touchdowns and two extra points). On December 8, 1946, the Giants played the Akron Bears in the league championship game. Niles threw one touchdown as the Giants won 14–13.

Niles played in four games at quarterback for the New York Giants during the 1947 NFL season before suffering a season-ending injury (two cracked ribs which pinched a nerve, causing neuritis). Overall during the 1947 season, he recorded 19 completions on 57 passing attempts (33.3%) for 269 yards, one touchdown, and seven interceptions while also rushing eight times for 24 yards.

== Personal life ==
Niles was later a district sales organizer for Pillsbury Mills in Florence, South Carolina. He died on December 27, 1950, in Sumter, South Carolina, of injuries suffered in a car accident.
