= 1945 college football rankings =

- Season: 1945
- Bowl season: 1945–46 bowl games
- End of season champions: Army (AP); Oklahoma A&M (AFCA)

One human poll comprised the 1945 college football rankings. Unlike most sports, college football's governing body, the NCAA, does not bestow a national championship, instead that title is bestowed by one or more different polling agencies. There are two main weekly polls that begin in the preseason—the AP Poll and the Coaches' Poll. The Coaches' Poll began operation in 1950; in addition, the AP Poll did not begin conducting preseason polls until that same year.

== Legend ==
	Increase in ranking
	Decrease in ranking
	Not ranked previous week
	National champion
(#–#)	Win–loss record
(Italics)	Number of first place votes
т	Tied with team above or below also with this symbol

== AP Poll ==
The final AP Poll was released on December 2, at the end of the 1945 regular season, weeks before the major bowls. The AP would not release a post-bowl season final poll regularly until 1968.

	Week 1 Oct 7	Week 2 Oct 14	Week 3 Oct 21	Week 4 Oct 28	Week 5 Nov 4	Week 6 Nov 11	Week 7 Nov 18	Week 8 Nov 25	Week 9 (Final) Dec 2	
1.	Army (2–0) (86)	Army (3–0) (90)	Army (4–0) (101)	Army (5–0) (91)	Army (6–0) (86)	Army (7–0) (91)	Army (8–0) (81)	Army (8–0) (80)	Army (9–0) (116)	1.
2.	Navy (2–0) (14)	Navy (3–0) (14)	Notre Dame (4–0) (4)	Notre Dame (5–0) (6)	Notre Dame (5–0–1) (3)	Navy (6–0–1) (5)	Navy (7–0–1)	Navy (7–0–1)	Navy (7–1–1)	2.
3.	Notre Dame (2–0) (3)	Notre Dame (3–0)	Navy (4–0) (5)	Navy (5–0) (3)	Alabama (6–0) (4)	Alabama (6–0) (5)	Alabama (7–0) (1)	Alabama (8–0) (1)	Alabama (9–0)	3.
4.	Ohio State (2–0) (3)	Ohio State (3–0) (1)	Purdue (5–0)	Alabama (5–0) (4)	Navy (5–0–1) (3)	Indiana (7–0–1)	Indiana (8–0–1)	Indiana (9–0–1) (1)	Indiana (9–0–1)	4.
5.	Minnesota (2–0) (2)	Minnesota (3–0)	Minnesota (4–0) (1)	Indiana (5–0–1)	St. Mary's (6–0) (2)	St. Mary's (6–0) (4)	Notre Dame (6–1–1)	Notre Dame (7–1–1)	Oklahoma A&M (8–0)	5.
6.	USC (3–0) (1)	Alabama (3–0)	Alabama (4–0)	Ohio State (4–1)	Indiana (6–0–1) (3)	Penn (5–1)	Oklahoma A&M (7–0)	Oklahoma A&M (8–0)	Michigan (7–3)	6.
7.	Alabama (2–0)	Penn (3–0)	Penn (3–0)	Penn (3–1)	Michigan (5–2)	Notre Dame (5–1–1)	Ohio State (7–1)	Michigan (7–3)	St. Mary's (7–1)	7.
8.	Indiana (2–0–1)	Indiana (3–0–1)	Indiana (4–0–1)	St. Mary's (5–0) (2)	Ohio State (5–1)	Oklahoma A&M (6–0)	Michigan (6–3)	Penn (6–2)	Penn (6–2)	8.
9.	Michigan (3–1) (1)	Purdue (4–0)	Texas (5–0)	Oklahoma A&M (5–0)	Penn (4–1)	Ohio State (6–1)	St. Mary's (6–1)	St. Mary's (7–1)	Notre Dame (7–2–1)	9.
10.	Texas (3–0)	Texas (4–0)	St. Mary's (5–0) (1)	Michigan (4–2)	Columbia (6–0)	Holy Cross (7–0)	Texas (8–1)	Texas (8–1)	Texas (9–1)	10.
11.	Penn (2–0)	St. Mary's (4–0)	Columbia (4–0)	Holy Cross (5–0)	Oklahoma A&M (5–0)	Purdue (7–1)	Penn (5–2)	Duke (6–2)	USC (7–3)	11.
12.	Holy Cross (2–0)	Georgia (4–0)	Ohio State (3–1)	Columbia (5–0)	Purdue (6–1)	Penn State (5–1)	UCLA (5–2) (1)	Ohio State (7–2)	Ohio State (7–2)	12.
13.	Duke (2–1)	Michigan (3–2)	LSU (3–1)	Purdue (5–1)	Holy Cross (6–0)	Virginia (6–0)	Virginia (7–0)	Holy Cross (8–1)	Duke (6–2)	13.
14.	Oklahoma A&M (2–0)	USC (3–1)	Tulsa (4–0)	Oklahoma (4–2)	LSU (5–1)	Michigan (5–3) т	Tennessee (6–1)	Missouri (6–3) т	Tennessee (8–1)	14.
15.	Purdue (3–0)	Oklahoma A&M (3–0)	Holy Cross (4–0)	Mississippi State (4–0)	Virginia (5–0)	Oklahoma (5–3) т	Duke (5–2)	Tulsa (6–2) т	LSU (7–2)	15.
16.	Tulsa (3–0)	Duke (3–1)	Michigan (3–2)	Minnesota (4–1)	Duke (4–2)	Mississippi State (5–1)	Missouri (5–3)	USC (6–3)	Holy Cross (8–1)	16.
17.	Texas A&M (3–0)	Columbia (3–0)	Oklahoma A&M (4–0)	LSU (4–1)	Texas (6–1)	Texas (7–1)	Tulsa (5–2)	Tennessee (7–1)	Tulsa (7–2)	17.
18.	Tennessee (2–0)	Tulsa (3–0)	Mississippi State (4–0)	Duke (3–2) т	Washington (5–1)	Tennessee (6–1)	Purdue (7–2)	Clemson (6–2–1)	Georgia (8–2)	18.
19.	St. Mary's (3–0)	Holy Cross (3–0)	Duke (3–1)	Washington (4–1) т	Tulsa (4–1)	Tulsa (4–2)	LSU (6–2)	Columbia (8–1)	Wake Forest (4–3–1)	19.
20.	Mississippi State (2–0) т; Virginia (3–0) т	Mississippi State (3–0)	USC (4–1)	Northwestern (2–2–1)	Minnesota (4–2)	Duke (5–2)	Mississippi State (6–1)	Virginia (7–1)	Columbia (8–1)	20.
	Week 1 Oct 7	Week 2 Oct 14	Week 3 Oct 21	Week 4 Oct 28	Week 5 Nov 4	Week 6 Nov 11	Week 7 Nov 18	Week 8 Nov 25	Week 9 (Final) Dec 2	
		Dropped: Tennessee; Texas A&M; Virginia	Dropped: Georgia	Dropped: Texas; Tulsa; USC	Dropped: Mississippi State; Northwestern; Oklahoma	Dropped: Columbia; LSU; Minnesota; Washington	Dropped: Holy Cross; Oklahoma; Penn State	Dropped: LSU; Mississippi State; Purdue; UCLA	Dropped: Clemson; Missouri; Virginia	

== Litkenhous Ratings ==
The final Litkenhous Ratings released in December 1945 provided numerical rankings to more than 350 college and military football programs. The top 100 ranked teams were:

1. Army (9–0)
2. Navy (7–1–1)
3. Alabama (10–0)
4. Camp Shoemaker
5. El Toro Marines (8–2)
6. Army Air Forces Training Command
7. Indiana (9–0–1)
8. Michigan (7–3)
9. Jacksonville NAS (9–2)
10. Penn (6–2)
11. Third Air Force (7–2–1)
12. Notre Dame (7–2–1)
13. Ohio State (7–2)
14. First Air Force (3–2–3)
15. Fourth Air Force (6–3–1)
16. San Diego NTS (4–2)
17. Oklahoma A&M (9–0)
18. Air Transport Command
19. Georgia (9–2)
20. Great Lakes Navy (6–4–1)
21. Saint Mary's (7–2)
22. Purdue (7–3)
23. Duke
24. Northwestern
25. LSU
26. Saint Mary's Pre-Flight
27. Personnel Distribution Command
28. Fort Benning
29. Illinois
30. Tulsa
31. Wisconsin
32. Corpus Christi NAS
33. Second Air Force
34. Minnesota
35. Tennessee
36. USC
37. UCLA
38. Texas
39. Columbia
40. Fort Pierce Navy
41. Mississippi State
42. Holy Cross
43. Texas A&M
44. SMU
45. Miami (FL)
46. Little Creek Amphibs
47. Clemson
48. Georgia Tech
49. Keesler Field
50. Hutchinson NAS
51. Penn State
52. Camp Peary
53. California
54. Marquette
55. Temple
56. Fort Warren
57. Arizona
58. Pittsburgh
59. Wake Forest
60. Maxwell Field
61. Miami (OH)
62. Michigan State
63. Oklahoma
64. Rice
65. Washington State
66. Missouri
67. Iowa State
68. Oberlin
69. Yale
70. Washington
71. Baylor
72. North Carolina
73. Virginia
74. Dartmouth
75. Cornell
76. Auburn
77. Camp Lee
78. New Mexico
79. Colgate
80. Detroit
81. Drake
82. Colorado
83. Villanova
84. Hondo Field
85. TCU
86. Oregon
87. Bainbridge Navy
88. Tulane
89. Fort Bragg
90. Denver
91. Texas Tech
92. Arkansas
93. Florida
94. Brown
95. Syracuse
96. William & Mary
97. Pensacola Navy
98. Princeton
99. Olatine Navy
100. NC State

== See also ==
- 1945 College Football All-America Team
