= Denver Mills =

American football player (1925–1997)

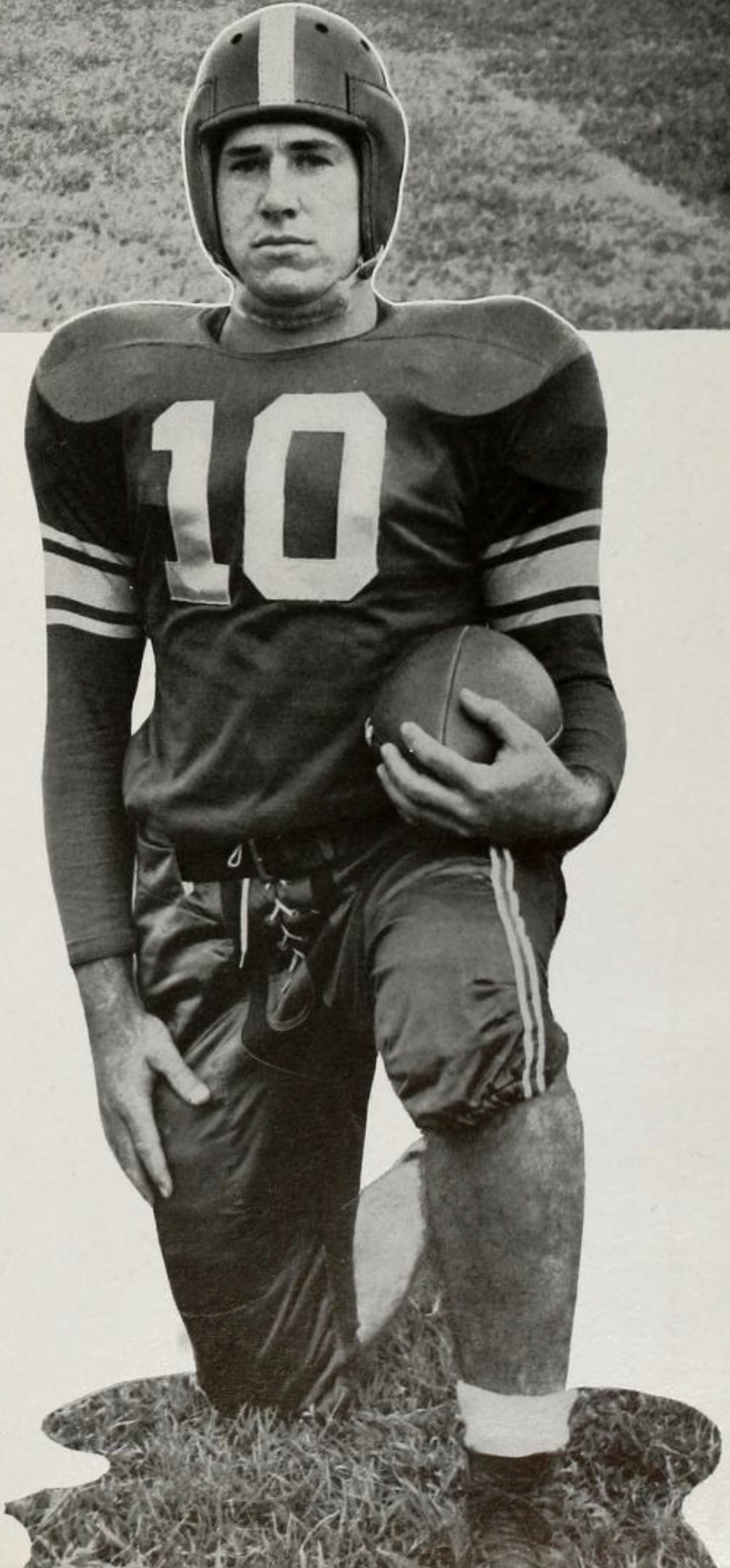
- Mills with the William & Mary Indians, 1946

No. 89 (Chicago Cardinals)
- Position: Linebacker

Personal information
- Born: August 29, 1925; Crockett, Virginia, U.S.
- Died: November 4, 1997 (aged 72); Richmond, Virginia, U.S.
- Listed height: 6 ft 3 in (1.91 m)
- Listed weight: 225 lb (102 kg)

Career information
- High school: Wytheville High School
- College: William & Mary

Career history
- Richmond Rebels (1948–1950); Chicago Cardinals (1952)

Awards and highlights
- Second-team All-SoCon (1945)

Career statistics
- Games played: 1 (NFL)
- Stats at Pro Football Reference

Denver Burton Mills (August 29, 1925 – November 4, 1997) was an American professional football player for the American Football League's Richmond Rebels and the National Football League (NFL) Chicago Cardinals. Mills played his collegiate career for the William & Mary Indians football team, where he was voted co-captain of 1945 Associated Press All-Virginia team and served as the team captain for the 1946 William & Mary team. While at the College of William & Mary, Mills was also on the track and field team. He then played for the minor league Richmond Rebels from 1948 to 1950. As a linebacker, he played in one game in the 1952 NFL season. His career ended due to a knee injury's persisting effects. He would later work in the railroad industry.

== Early life ==
Mills was born in Crockett in southwestern Virginia on August 29, 1925. He attended Wytheville High School, where he lettered three times as a tailback under three different coaches. Mills had the nickname of "Denny".

== Collegiate career ==
Mills attended the College of William & Mary in Williamsburg, Virginia. While there, he played for the William & Mary Indians football team under head coach Rube McCray. The Indians did not play in the 1943 college football season due to losses of players to military service in the Second World War. Mills played his first college football season as part of the 1944 William & Mary Indians as an end, joining the team at the same time as the center Tommy Thompson and the tackles Knox Ramsey and Lou Creekmur. With his height of 6 ft 2 in (1.88 m) and weight of 190 lb (86 kg), Mills had been initially tapped as a blocking back before being moved into the end position. Mills wore the jersey number 10 for the Indians. Outside of sports, Mills was a member of the local Sigma Phi fraternity at the college.

The 1944 season was part of a 10-season-long run of successive winning seasons for the William & Mary Indians, excluding the 1943 season. This era of "big-time football" at the college ended in 1949 with the events which led to the 1951 William & Mary scandal. Mills first season with the Indians ended with a record of 5–2–1. Mill's season on the 1945 William & Mary Indians football team was his best. Mills made three catches in the Indians' loss to the Tennessee Volunteers, a touchdown catch during the win over the Virginia Polytechnic Institute Gobblers, the only Indians touchdown against in their loss to the North Carolina State Wolfpack, and another touchdown in the win over the Maryland Terrapins. This landed him a slot on the 1945 All-Southern Conference football team. Mills was elected by Virginian college coaches as one of eleven players on Virginia's All-State team for consideration by the Associated Press's 1945 All-America college football team. Mills was named co-captain of the All-State team alongside Lynn Chewning of the Virginia Military Institute Keydets. Three other William & Mary players made the All-State team that year.

In 1946, McCray described as a "fine end" who "doesn't need to much to be one of the finest ends in the Southern Conference". Mills was made the team captain of the 1946 William & Mary Indians football team. He was the first underclassman selected to hold the position for the Indians. The 1946 team saw the return of many players who had left the program for military service, including Ralph Sazio, the future William & Mary head coach Jack Freeman, and Tom Mikula. Before the start of the 1946 college football season, Mills was injured. Expected out for three weeks, he sat out the game against the Miami Hurricanes, the defending Orange Bowl champions, which the Indians lost 3–13. Mills returned later in the season, catching a touchdown pass in a win against the Virginia Military Institute Keydets. The Indians finished the season with an 8–2 record and second place in the Southern Conference, but failed to secure a place in a bowl game.

While at the College of William & Mary, Mills was also on the track and field team, where he was a hurdler. Academic issues prevented him from participating in the 1947 track and field season.

== Professional football career ==
After college, Mills played in the American Football League, a minor league for football, on the Richmond Rebels. He played there for three seasons from 1948 to 1950, helping take the Rebels to win the 1949 league championship. In 1950, Mills played for the Rebels in an exhibition game against the major league Chicago Bears of the National Football League (NFL). The Rebels served as a farm team for the Bears.

Mills was drafted into the United States Army in 1951 and stationed at Fort Eustis in Newport News, Virginia, near his old college. While in the Army, Mills played for the base's football squad and was named to the All-Army squad after a season where he threw nine touchdown passes. Mills, who had bulked up to 225 lb (102 kg), was being recruited by several NFL teams, including the Bears, Pittsburgh Steelers, and Washington Redskins. The NFL's Chicago Cardinals offered Mills a substantial but not publicly disclosed signing bonus, which Mills accepted.

Playing as a linebacker in jersey number 89 for the Cardinals, the 27-year-old Mills played in a single NFL game. The October 2, 1952, game between the Cardinals and Bears was a rivalry game held in Comiskey Park before an audience of 34,697 attendees. The Cardinals won with a score of 21–10. Mills was released from the Cardinals several days later to make room on the team's roster for Ray Pelfrey. The persistent impact of a knee injury prevented Mills from continuing his football career.

== Later life and death ==
After his football career, Mills worked in the railroad industry. He was an employee of Chesapeake and Ohio Railway in Richmond for 40 years. He died on November 4, 1997. Writing in 2024, Tim Hayes of the Bristol Herald Courier wrote that Mill's single game in the NFL ensured that his name would produce Google Search results, saying that it was "one fleeting moment [...] in a football life full of gridiron glory".
