= 1945 Alabama Crimson Tide football team =

American college football season

1945 Alabama Crimson Tide football

National co-champion (NCF) SEC champion Rose Bowl champion

Rose Bowl, W 34–14 vs. USC
- Conference: Southeastern Conference

Ranking
- AP: No. 3
- Record: 10–0 (6–0 SEC)
- Head coach: Frank Thomas (14th season)
- Captain: Game captains
- Home stadium: Denny Stadium; Legion Field; Cramton Bowl

1945 Southeastern Conference football standings
	Conf.					Overall
Team	W		L		T	W		L		T
No. 2 Alabama $	6	–	0	–	0	10	–	0	–	0
No. 14 Tennessee	3	–	1	–	0	8	–	1	–	0
No. 15 LSU	5	–	2	–	0	7	–	2	–	0
No. 18 Georgia	4	–	2	–	0	9	–	2	–	0
Ole Miss	3	–	3	–	0	4	–	5	–	0
Georgia Tech	2	–	2	–	0	4	–	6	–	0
Mississippi State	2	–	3	–	0	6	–	3	–	0
Auburn	2	–	3	–	0	5	–	5	–	0
Vanderbilt	2	–	4	–	0	3	–	6	–	0
Florida	1	–	3	–	1	4	–	5	–	1
Tulane	1	–	3	–	1	2	–	6	–	1
Kentucky	0	–	5	–	0	2	–	8	–	0
$ – Conference champion; Rankings from AP Poll

The 1945 Alabama Crimson Tide football team (variously "Alabama", "UA" or "Bama") represented the University of Alabama in the 1945 college football season. It was the Crimson Tide's 51st overall and 12th season as a member of the Southeastern Conference (SEC). The team was led by head coach Frank Thomas, in his 14th year, and played their home games at Denny Stadium in Tuscaloosa, Legion Field in Birmingham and at the Cramton Bowl in Montgomery. They finished with a perfect season (10–0 overall, 6–0 in the SEC) and with a victory in the Rose Bowl over USC. This team was the second season of the "War Babies" as coined by head coach Thomas.

The team led the nation in total defense, allowing an average of only 109.9 yards per game. The Crimson Tide was particularly tough against the rush, allowing an average of only 33.9 rushing yards per game and less than one yard per carry (320 opposition carries for 305 yards gained). On offense, Alabama ranked second nationally behind Army, averaging 421.7 yards per game. The team's statistical leaders included Lowell Tew with 715 rushing yards and Harry Gilmer with 905 passing yards. Gilmer led the nation with a .648 pass completion percentage.

The Crimson Tide opened the season on the road with a victory over Keesler Field after Jackson Army Air Base canceled their game at Denny Stadium. Alabama then defeated LSU in Baton Rouge before their first home win of the season at the Cramton Bowl over South Carolina. After victories over both Tennessee and Georgia at Legion Field, the Crimson Tide routed both Kentucky and Vanderbilt on the road to extend their record to 7–0. They then closed the season with a pair of games at Denny Stadium where they defeated the Pensacola NAS and Mississippi State to complete an undefeated regular season. One month later, Alabama won the Rose Bowl over USC to finish the season undefeated.

The 1945 season was the fourth perfect season in Alabama history, following the perfect seasons of 1925, 1930 and 1934. However, Alabama did not win the national championship in 1945; that honor went to the Army Cadets team that went 9–0 and outscored its opponents by a 412–46 margin. The Crimson Tide finished third in the AP poll behind the Cadets and Navy.

== Schedule ==
Date	Opponent	Rank	Site	Result	Attendance
September 29	at Keesler Field*		Flier Field; Biloxi, MS	W 21–0	14,000
October 6	at LSU		Tiger Stadium; Baton Rouge, LA (rivalry)	W 26–7	40,000
October 13	South Carolina*	No. 7	Cramton Bowl; Montgomery, AL	W 55–0	14,000
October 20	Tennessee	No. 6	Legion Field; Birmingham, AL (Third Saturday in October)	W 25–7	28,000
October 27	Georgia	No. 6	Legion Field; Birmingham, AL (rivalry)	W 28–14	26,000
November 3	vs. Kentucky	No. 4	duPont Manual Stadium; Louisville, KY	W 60–19	11,000
November 17	at Vanderbilt	No. 3	Dudley Field; Nashville, TN	W 71–0	
November 24	Pensacola NAS*	No. 3	Denny Stadium; Tuscaloosa, AL	W 55–6	7,500
December 1	Mississippi State^{†}	No. 3	Denny Stadium; Tuscaloosa, AL (rivalry)	W 55–13	25,000
January 1, 1946	vs. No. 11 USC*	No. 3	Rose Bowl; Pasadena, CA (Rose Bowl)	W 34–14	93,000
*Non-conference game; ^{†}Homecoming; Rankings from AP Poll released prior to the game; Source:

== Rankings ==
Ranking movements Legend: ██ Increase in ranking ██ Decrease in ranking ( ) = First-place votes
	Week								
Poll	1	2	3	4	5	6	7	8	Final
AP	7	6	6	4 (4)	3 (4)	3 (5)	3 (1)	3 (1)	3

== Game summaries ==
=== Keesler Field ===
Team	1	2	3	4	Total
• Alabama	14	0	7	0	21
Keesler AAF	0	0	0	0	0

- Date: September 29
- Location: Flier Field
  Biloxi, Mississippi
- Game attendance: 14,000

To open the 1945 season, the Crimson Tide were originally scheduled to play a game against the Jackson Army Air Base at Denny Stadium. On September 8 coach Thomas announced that Jackson had canceled its entire 1945 schedule due to heavy cuts in personnel at the base. After unsuccessfully being able to schedule a replacement home game for the Jackson date, on September 23, coach Thomas announced the Crimson Tide would open the season against Keesler Field in Biloxi, Mississippi. Against the Fliers, Alabama won 21–0 before a crowd of 14,000 military personnel.

After they took a 7–0 lead, Alabama scored their second touchdown when Lowell Tew scored on a nine-yard reverse off a Harry Gilmer handoff lat in the first quarter. Tew then scored the final points of the game in the third quarter on a 20-yard reverse for a touchdown. In the game, Alabama rushed for a total of 226 yards, but Gilmer only completed a single pass for ten-yards.

=== LSU ===
Team	1	2	3	4	Total
• Alabama	13	7	0	6	26
LSU	0	0	7	0	7

- Date: October 6
- Location: Tiger Stadium
  Baton Rouge, Louisiana
- Game attendance: 40,000

To open conference play for the 1945 season, the Crimson Tide traveled to play LSU and left Baton Rouge with a 26–7 victory. Alabama scored first when Harry Gilmer threw a 50-yard touchdown pass to Rebel Steiner for an early 7–0 lead. Their second touchdown came two minutes later on a second 50-yard Gilmer touchdown pass. For the second time Gilmer threw to Steiner, but this time the LSU defender Dan Sandifer knocked the ball out of his hands and into the air. Lowell Tew then caught the deflected pass and ran it in for the score. Late in the second quarter, the Crimson tide extended their lead to 20–0 at halftime when Gilmer connected with Steiner for a 13-yard touchdown reception.

The lone Tigers scoring drive came in the third and as set up after Sandifer intercepted a Gilmer pass. Eight plays later, William Montgomery made the score 20–7 with his short touchdown run. Alabama closed the game with a fourth-quarter touchdown run by Fred Grant to make the final score 26–7.

The win was Thomas' 100th win at the Capstone, making him the first coach to lead the Crimson Tide to 100 or more victories. Thomas would retire with 115 wins as the Tide's head coach. Paul "Bear" Bryant and Nick Saban have subsequently joined Thomas in guiding Crimson Tide teams to over 100 wins.

=== South Carolina ===
Team	1	2	3	4	Total
South Carolina	0	0	0	0	0
• #7 Alabama	27	14	14	0	55

- Date: October 13
- Location: Cramton Bowl
  Montgomery, Alabama
- Game attendance: 14,000

After their victory over LSU, the Crimson Tide were ranked in the No. 7 position in the first AP Poll of the season. In their first home game, the Crimson Tide defeated the South Carolina Gamecocks 55–0 at the Cramton Bowl. Alabama opened the game with four first-quarter touchdowns to take a 27–0 lead on a short Fred Grant run, a Gordon Pettus pass to Grant, a 51-yard Harry Gilmer run and on a Lowell Tew run. A pair of touchdowns in the second quarter on runs by Norwood Hodges and the Lou Scales for a 41–0 halftime lead for Alabama.

The Crimson Tide scored their final points of the game in the third when Grant and Scales scored on touchdown runs for the 55–0 win. In the game, Alabama rushed for 447 yards and all 41 players that dressed saw playing time.

=== Tennessee ===
Third Saturday in October

Team	1	2	3	4	Total
Tennessee	0	0	0	7	7
• #6 Alabama	7	12	0	6	25

- Date: October 20
- Location: Legion Field
  Birmingham, Alabama
- Game attendance: 28,000

With their win over South Carolina, Alabama moved up to the No. 6 position in the second AP Poll of the season. Against Tennessee, the Crimson Tide defeated the Volunteers 25–7 at a sold-out Legion Field. The Crimson Tide took a 7–0 lead in the first quarter on a six-yard Harry Gilmer touchdown run. A pair of second-quarter touchdowns further extended the Alabama lead to 19–0 at halftime. The scores were made on a one-yard Fred Grant run and then on a 24-yard Gilmer pass to Grant.

After a scoreless third quarter that saw a five-yard Lowell Tew touchdown run nullified by a holding penalty, Tennessee scored their lone points early in the fourth quarter. The touchdown was scored on a 42-yard pass from Bob Lund to Max Partin and cut the Alabama lead to 19–7. The Crimson Tide then closed the game with a one-yard Norwood Hodges touchdown run to make the final score 25–7.

=== Georgia ===
Team	1	2	3	4	Total
Georgia	7	0	7	0	14
• #6 Alabama	7	14	7	0	28

- Date: October 27
- Location: Legion Field
  Birmingham, Alabama
- Game attendance: 26,000

After their victory over Tennessee, Alabama retained their No. 6 ranking for their game against Georgia. Against the Bulldogs, the Crimson Tide won the 28–14 before 26,000 fans at Legion Field. On the first offensive play of the game John Donaldson fumbled the ball, and Norwood Hodges recovered for Alabama at the Georgia 25-yard line. Eight plays later, Harry Gilmer threw a nine-yard touchdown pass to Lowell Tew for a 7–0 Crimson Tide lead. Later in the first, Georgia tied the game at 7–7 on a 31-yard Charley Trippi touchdown run. After being held on a fourth-and-goal on their first possession of the second quarter, Alabama extended their lead to 14–7 on their next possession on a six-yard Gilmer pass to Fred Davis. Gilmer then threw his third touchdown of the day late in the second quarter on a 12-yard pass to Hodges for a 21–7 halftime lead.

Midway through the third, the Bulldogs scored their final touchdown of the game when John Rauch threw a 65-yard completion to Reid Moseley. Later in the quarter, a Trippi fumble gave the Crimson Tide possession at the Georgia six-yard line, and two plays later Hodges scored from inside the one to make the final score 28–14.

=== Kentucky ===
Team	1	2	3	4	Total
• #4 Alabama	21	20	6	13	60
Kentucky	6	6	7	0	19

- Date: November 3
- Location: duPont Manual Stadium
  Louisville, Kentucky

After their victory over Georgia, Alabama moved up two spots to the No. 4 ranking for prior to their game against Kentucky. At Louisville, the Crimson Tide rushed for 572 yards in their 60–19 rout of the Wildcats. In the first quarter, touchdown runs of 36, 16 and 60 yards were made by Lowell Tew, Norwood Hodges and Harry Gilmer for Alabama and a 17-yard George Blanda touchdown pass to Dick Hensley for Kentucky made the score 21–6 after the first quarter. In the second quarter, Alabama again scored three touchdowns. This time runs of 1 and 78 yards were made by Hodges and Gordon Pettus in addition to a seven-yard Gilmer touchdown pass to Rebel Steiner. Babe Ray scored for the Wildcats on a six-yard run and the Crimson Tide led 41–12 at halftime.

In the third period, each team traded touchdowns when James Robertson scored on a 51-yard run for the Crimson Tide and on a 36-yard Hartford Granitz pass to Wallace Jones for the Wildcats to make the score 47–19 at the end of the third. In the fourth, Alabama tallied two more touchdowns on runs of 95 by Gilmer and two-yards by Lou Scales to make the final score 60–19.

=== Vanderbilt ===
Team	1	2	3	4	Total
• #3 Alabama	7	14	28	22	71
Vanderbilt	0	0	0	0	0

- Date: November 17
- Location: Dudley Field
  Nashville, Tennessee

Against the Vanderbilt Commodores, Alabama won 71–0 at Dudley Field in Nashville. Harry Gilmer scored the first points of the game on a ten-yard run for a 7–0 Alabama lead at the end of the first. In the second quarter. the Crimson Tide extended their lead to 21–0 bay halftime with touchdowns scored on a 25-yard Lowell Tew run and on an 18-yard Gilmer pass to James Corbitt. The scoring continued in the second half with four touchdowns in the third and three in the fourth for the 71–0 victory. Third quarter points were scored by Fred Grant on a two-yard run, a 47-yard Gilmer pass to Rebel Steiner, a five-yard Gilmer run and on a 15-yard Corbitt run. Fourth quarter points were scored by Gordon Pettus on a seven-yard run, a 20-yard blocked punt return by Dickson, a second blocked punt for a safety and on a 33-yard Frank Fedak pass to Lou Scales. In the game, the Alabama defense was also dominant in having only allowed two-yards passing and minus five-yards rushing to the Commodores for the game.

=== Pensacola NAS ===
Team	1	2	3	4	Total
Pensacola NAS	0	0	6	0	6
• #3 Alabama	21	14	7	13	55

- Date: November 24
- Location: Tuscaloosa, Alabama
- Game attendance: 7,500

The day before their game against the Goslings, Alabama accepted an invitation to compete in the 1946 Rose Bowl. In what was the first game played at Denny Stadium of the season, Alabama met the team that represented the Naval Air Station Pensacola, and defeated the Goslings 55–6. In the first quarter, Crimson Tide touchdowns were scored by Lowell Tew on a 15-yard run, on a short Norwood Hodges run and on a four-yard Fred Grant run for a 21–0 lead at the end on the first quarter. Alabama added second-quarter touchdowns on a two-yard Hodges run and on a 43-yard James Corbitt run for a 35–0 halftime lead. After each team traded third quarter scores, the Crimson Tide closed the game with a pair of fourth-quarter touchdowns for the 55–6 victory.

=== Mississippi State ===
Team	1	2	3	4	Total
Mississippi State	7	0	6	0	13
• #3 Alabama	0	13	14	28	55

- Date: December 1
- Location: Denny Stadium
  Tuscaloosa, Alabama
- Game attendance: 25,000

On what was homecoming before the largest crowd to date at Denny Stadium, Alabama defeated the Mississippi State Maroons 55–13 to complete the eighth undefeated regular season in school history.

=== USC ===
Rose Bowl Game

Team	1	2	3	4	Total
#11 USC	0	0	0	14	14
• #3 Alabama	7	13	7	7	34

- Date: January 1, 1946
- Location: Rose Bowl
  Pasadena, California
- Game attendance: 93,000

On November 23, University officials accepted an invitation to participate in the 1946 Rose Bowl. Against USC, the Crimson Tide defeated the Trojans 34–14 to complete a perfect season. Alabama took a 34–0 lead into the fourth quarter before the Trojans scored their first points. Alabama touchdowns were scored on a pair of one-yard Hal Self runs, a five-yard Lowell Tew run, a one-yard Norwood Hodges run and on a 20-yard Self pass to Harry Gilmer.

This edition of the Rose Bowl also marked the final one that did not feature a matchup between teams from what are now both the Big Ten Conference and the Pac-12 Conference until Miami played in the 2002 Rose Bowl. This was the case as the Pacific Coast Conference and the Big Nine Conference entered into an agreement to place their conference champions in the Rose Bowl effective for the 1946 season.

== Personnel ==
=== Varsity letter winners ===
Player	Hometown	Position
Jim Bush	Columbus, Georgia	Guard
Jim Cain	Eudora, Arkansas	End
Francis Cassidy	Neff, Ohio	Tackle
James Corbitt	Nashville, Tennessee	Halfback
Frank Fedak	Short Creek, West Virginia	Halfback
Lee Flowers	Mobile, Alabama	Tackle
D. Joe Gambrell	Talladega, Alabama	Center
Richard Gibson	Mobile, Alabama	End
Harry Gilmer	Birmingham, Alabama	Halfback
Fred Grant	Christiansburg, Virginia	Fullback
Jim Grantham	Llano, Texas	End
Jack Green	Centre, Alabama	Guard
Norwood Hodges	Hueytown, Alabama	Fullback
Vaughn Mancha	Birmingham, Alabama	Center
Hugh Morrow	Birmingham, Alabama	Quarterback
Lionel W. Noonan	Mobile, Alabama	Fullback
Gordon Pettus	Birmingham, Alabama	Halfback
James Robertson	Scottsboro, Alabama	Halfback
Lou Scales	Glencoe, Alabama	Fullback
Hal Self	Decatur, Alabama	Quarterback
Rebel Steiner	Birmingham, Alabama	End
Nicholas Terlizzi	Upper Montclair, New Jersey	Tackle
Lowell Tew	Waynesboro, Mississippi	Fullback
Tom Whitley	Birmingham, Alabama	Tackle
John Wozniak	Fairhope, Pennsylvania	Guard

=== Coaching staff ===
Name	Position	Seasons at Alabama	Alma mater
Frank Thomas	Head coach	14	Notre Dame (1923)
Hank Crisp	Assistant coach	22	VPI (1920)
Harold Drew	Assistant coach	12	Bates (1916)
Malcolm Laney	Assistant coach	2	Alabama (1932)

== National championship ==
In 1980, the 1945 Alabama team was selected along with Army as co-champions for 1945 by the National Championship Foundation. Alabama does not claim 1945 as one of their 18 recognized national championships.
