= Ox DaGrosa =

American coach and administrator (1902–1953)

Biographical details
- Born: February 17, 1902; Atlantic City, New Jersey, U.S.
- Died: March 23, 1953 (aged 51); Philadelphia, Pennsylvania, U.S.
- Education: Temple School of Law

Playing career
- 1922–1925: Colgate

Coaching career (HC unless noted)
- 1926–1929: Georgetown (line)
- 1930–1933: Temple (assistant)
- 1936: Philadelphia Eagles (assistant)
- 1944: Holy Cross (line)
- 1945–1947: Holy Cross
- 1948: Temple (assistant)

Administrative career (AD unless noted)
- 1949–1953: Pennsylvania Athletic Commissioner

Head coaching record
- Overall: 17–10–2
- Bowls: 0–1

John "Ox" DaGrosa (February 17, 1902 – April 23, 1953) was an American coach and administrator who served as head football coach at the College of the Holy Cross and was a member of the Pennsylvania Athletic Commission.

== Early life and career ==
DaGrosa attended Colgate University from 1922 to 1925. He played every position on the school's football team, but was primarily a lineman. After his playing career he served as a line coach under Lou Little at Georgetown from 1926 to 1929. From 1930 to 1933, DaGrosa was an assistant coach at Temple and attended the Temple School of Law. In 1936 he was an assistant with the NFL's Philadelphia Eagles. In 1940, he was the Republican nominee for the First District seat in the Pennsylvania State Senate. In 1941, he was the national director of industrial activities and sports for the Hale America program, a national health initiative established after the attack on Pearl Harbor and America's entry into World War II.

== Holy Cross ==
In 1944, DaGrosa became the line coach and chief assistant at Holy Cross, succeeding Lud Wray. Due to head coach Ank Scanlan's war work, DaGrosa led the team five days a week while Scanlan was only able to coach on the weekends.

In 1945, DaGrosa was named head coach and given a three-year contract. That year, DaGrosa led Holy Cross to an 8–1 record, including a 46 to 0 defeat of rival Boston College at Fenway Park. Holy Cross received an invitation to the 1946 Orange Bowl, but lost to Miami 13 to 6.

The following year, the team went 5–4, including a 13 to 6 upset of Boston College in the season finale.

In 1947, Holy Cross started training camp with only ten players due to graduation and transfers. By October, injuries forced DaGrosa to ask a member of the school's baseball team who had never played football before to join the team. On November 5, 1947, DaGrosa stated at a testimonial dinner that "this would be the last year I shall be away from my family" (DaGrosa's family resided in Atlantic City, New Jersey while he coached at Holy Cross). On November 24, the school announced that DaGrosa would resign following the final game against Boston College. The Crusaders defeated Boston College 20 to 6 in his final game as head coach to finish the season 4–4–2.

On March 7, 1948, Temple University announced that DaGrosa would serve as lead assistant to head football coach Ray Morrison. DaGrosa also served on the coaching staff of the northern team in the 1948 Blue–Gray Football Classic.

== Pennsylvania Athletic Commission ==
In 1949, DaGrosa was appointed to the Pennsylvania Athletic Commission. During his tenure he served as the commission's primary spokesperson.

On May 9, 1950, DaGrosa announced that the Commission had stripped Jake Lamotta of his middleweight championship because Lamotta had failed to defend his title in 11 months and refused to defend it against top contenders Sugar Ray Robinson or Robert Villemain. The commission instead chose to recognize Robinson after he defeated Villemain on June 5 at Philadelphia Municipal Stadium. On April 2, 1951, DaGrosa announced the suspension of Ike Williams following Williams' failure to appear at a scheduled bout. On February 2, 1952, the Pennsylvania Athletic Commission chose not to go along with Indiana's suspension of World Heavyweight Champion Jersey Joe Walcott after Walcott failed to appear at an exhibition. DaGrosa called the suspension "unfair and arbitrary", as he had recommended to the Indiana commission that the fight be canceled due to Walcott's ill health.

== Death ==
In February 1953, DaGrosa suffered a heart attack which left him bedridden. He died on April 23, 1953, at his home in Philadelphia after suffering another heart attack. He left a wife, Mary Bennett DaGrosa, and two children, John and Ruth.

== Head coaching record ==
Year	Team	Overall	Conference	Standing	Bowl/playoffs	AP^{#}
Holy Cross Crusaders (Independent) (1945–1947)
1945	Holy Cross	8–2			L Orange	16
1946	Holy Cross	5–4				
1947	Holy Cross	4–4–2				
Holy Cross:		17–10–2				
Total:		17–10–2				
^{#}Rankings from final AP Poll.
