= Ed Sharkey =

American gridiron football player (1927–2015)

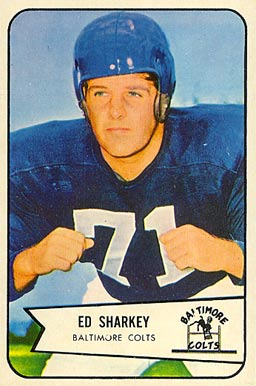
- Sharkey on a 1954 Bowman football card

Profile
- Positions: Linebacker, guard

Personal information
- Born: July 6, 1927; Brooklyn, New York, U.S.
- Died: December 13, 2015 (aged 88); Centralia, Washington, U.S.

Career information
- College: Duke; Nevada-Reno

Career history
- 1947–1949: New York Yankees
- 1950: New York Yanks
- 1952: Cleveland Browns
- 1953: Baltimore Colts
- 1954–1955: Philadelphia Eagles
- 1955–1956: San Francisco 49ers
- 1957–1958: BC Lions

Awards and highlights
- First-team All-SoCon (1945)
- Stats at Pro Football Reference

Edward Joseph Sharkey (July 6, 1927 - December 13, 2015) was a National Football League (NFL) linebacker for the New York Yanks, Cleveland Browns, Baltimore Colts, Philadelphia Eagles, and the San Francisco 49ers. He also played in the All-America Football Conference (AAFC) for the New York Yankees. Sharkey attended Duke University and the University of Nevada.

Sharkey played for the British Columbia Lions of the Canadian Football League (CFL) in 1957, playing guard, center and linebacker positions.

== College career ==
After graduating from DeSoto County High School, Sharkey attended Duke University on scholarship, starting at center as a true freshman. Only 17 years old, Sharkey remained in the starting lineup in the 1945 Sugar Bowl. Duke defeated Alabama 29–26.

Sharkey transferred to the University of Reno, Nevada in 1945 where he would finish his collegiate career.

== Professional career ==
Upon the conclusion of his collegiate career, the New York Yankees of the All-America Football Conference signed Sharkey to a contract. Sharkey departed the Yankees in 1951 to join the United States Marine Corps during the Korean War.

After serving in the Korean War, Sharkey resumed his football career with the Cleveland Browns beginning in 1952 where he spent one season. In 1953, Sharkey was included in a trade which saw him join the Baltimore Colts. The following year, Sharkey was traded to the Philadelphia Eagles. For a time, Sharkey swapped positions, moving from center to linebacker during the 1954 season. All-pro linebacker Chuck Bednarik filled in at center in Sharkey's absence.

The British Columbia Lions of the Canadian Football League signed Sharkey in 1957. Sharkey was awarded with all league honors for his play at guard and linebacker. Sharkey sustained a career-ending neck injury the following season.

== Personal life ==
Sharkey worked in sales for beer and automotive companies after the conclusion of his football career. Sharkey married his high school girlfriend in 1953, with whom he had 8 children and 9 grandchildren.

On December 13, 2015, Sharkey died in Centralia, Washington.
