= 1945 Kentucky Wildcats football team =

American college football season

1945 Kentucky Wildcats football
- Conference: Southeastern Conference
- Record: 2–8 (0–5 SEC)
- Head coach: Bernie Shively (1st season)
- Captain: Roger Yost
- Home stadium: McLean Stadium

1945 Southeastern Conference football standings
	Conf.					Overall
Team	W		L		T	W		L		T
No. 2 Alabama $	6	–	0	–	0	10	–	0	–	0
No. 14 Tennessee	3	–	1	–	0	8	–	1	–	0
No. 15 LSU	5	–	2	–	0	7	–	2	–	0
No. 18 Georgia	4	–	2	–	0	9	–	2	–	0
Ole Miss	3	–	3	–	0	4	–	5	–	0
Georgia Tech	2	–	2	–	0	4	–	6	–	0
Mississippi State	2	–	3	–	0	6	–	3	–	0
Auburn	2	–	3	–	0	5	–	5	–	0
Vanderbilt	2	–	4	–	0	3	–	6	–	0
Florida	1	–	3	–	1	4	–	5	–	1
Tulane	1	–	3	–	1	2	–	6	–	1
Kentucky	0	–	5	–	0	2	–	8	–	0
$ – Conference champion; Rankings from AP Poll

The 1945 Kentucky Wildcats football team was an American football team that represented the University of Kentucky as a member of the Southeastern Conference (SEC) during the 1945 college football season. In their first year under head coach Bernie Shively, the Wildcats compiled an overall record of 2–8, with a conference record of 0–5, and finished 12th in the SEC.

== Schedule ==
Date	Opponent	Site	Result	Attendance	Source
September 21	vs. Ole Miss	Crump Stadium; Memphis, TN	L 7–21	18,000	
September 29	Cincinnati*	McLean Stadium; Lexington, KY	W 13–7	11,000	
October 6	at Michigan State*	Macklin Field; East Lansing, MI	L 6–7	9,300	
October 13	Georgia	McLean Stadium; Lexington, KY	L 6–48	13,000	
October 20	at Vanderbilt	Dudley Field; Nashville, TN (rivalry)	L 6–19	10,000	
October 27	at Cincinnati	Nippert Stadium; Cincinnati, OH	L 7–16	21,000	
November 3	vs. No. 4 Alabama	duPont Manual Stadium; Louisville, KY	L 19–60	11,000	
November 10	at West Virginia*	Mountaineer Field; Morgantown, WV	W 19–6	15,000	
November 17	Marquette*	McLean Stadium; Lexington, KY	L 13–19	7,000	
November 24	No. 14 Tennessee	Stoll Field; Lexington, KY (rivalry)	L 0–14	12,000	
*Non-conference game; Rankings from AP Poll released prior to the game
