= 1945 Mississippi State Maroons football team =

American college football season

1945 Mississippi State Maroons football
- Conference: Southeastern Conference
- Record: 6–3 (2–3 SEC)
- Head coach: Allyn McKeen (6th season)
- Home stadium: Scott Field

1945 Southeastern Conference football standings
	Conf.					Overall
Team	W		L		T	W		L		T
No. 2 Alabama $	6	–	0	–	0	10	–	0	–	0
No. 14 Tennessee	3	–	1	–	0	8	–	1	–	0
No. 15 LSU	5	–	2	–	0	7	–	2	–	0
No. 18 Georgia	4	–	2	–	0	9	–	2	–	0
Ole Miss	3	–	3	–	0	4	–	5	–	0
Georgia Tech	2	–	2	–	0	4	–	6	–	0
Mississippi State	2	–	3	–	0	6	–	3	–	0
Auburn	2	–	3	–	0	5	–	5	–	0
Vanderbilt	2	–	4	–	0	3	–	6	–	0
Florida	1	–	3	–	1	4	–	5	–	1
Tulane	1	–	3	–	1	2	–	6	–	1
Kentucky	0	–	5	–	0	2	–	8	–	0
$ – Conference champion; Rankings from AP Poll

The 1945 Mississippi State Maroons football team was an American football team that represented Mississippi State College (now known as Mississippi State University) as a member of the Southeastern Conference (SEC) during the 1945 college football season. In their sixth year under head coach Allyn McKeen, the Maroons compiled an overall record of 6–3, with a conference record of 2–3, and finished tied for seventh in the SEC.

== Schedule ==
Date	Opponent	Rank	Site	Result	Attendance	Source
September 29	Southwestern Louisiana*		Scott Field; Starkville, MS	W 31–0	4,000	
October 6	at Auburn		Legion Field; Birmingham, AL	W 20–0	18,000	
October 13	vs. Detroit*	No. 20	Crump Stadium; Memphis, TN	W 41–6	12,000	
October 20	Eastern Flying Training Command*	No. 20	Scott Field; Starkville, MS	W 16–6	5,000	
November 3	at Tulane	No. 15	Tulane Stadium; New Orleans, LA	L 13–14	25,000	
November 10	at No. 14 LSU		Tiger Stadium; Baton Rouge, LA (rivalry)	W 27–20	35,000	
November 17	Northwestern State*	No. 16	Scott Field; Starkville, MS	W 54–0	2,200	
November 24	Ole Miss	No. 20	Scott Field; Starkville, MS (Egg Bowl)	L 6–7	18,000	
December 1	at No. 3 Alabama		Denny Stadium; Tuscaloosa, AL (rivalry)	L 13–55	25,000	
*Non-conference game; Rankings from AP Poll released prior to the game

== Rankings ==
Ranking movements Legend: ██ Increase in ranking ██ Decrease in ranking — = Not ranked т = Tied with team above or below
	Week								
Poll	1	2	3	4	5	6	7	8	Final
AP	20т	20	18	15	—	16	20	—	—
