= 1945 Navy Midshipmen football team =

American college football season

1945 Navy Midshipmen football
- Conference: Independent

Ranking
- AP: No. 2
- Record: 7–1–1
- Head coach: Oscar Hagberg (2nd season)
- Captain: Dick Duden
- Home stadium: Thompson Stadium

1945 Southern college football independents records
	Conf.			Overall
Team	W	L	T	W		L		T
Miami (FL)		–		9	–	1	–	1
No. 3 Navy		–		7	–	1	–	1
Louisiana Normal (Grambling)		–		9	–	2	–	0
Virginia		–		7	–	2	–	0
Chattanooga		–		5	–	3	–	0
Jacksonville State		–		1	–	1	–	0
West Virginia		–		2	–	6	–	1
Tennessee Tech		–		1	–	8	–	0
Howard (AL)		–		0	–	5	–	0
Rankings from AP Poll

The 1945 Navy Midshipmen football team represented the United States Naval Academy during the 1945 college football season. In their second season under head coach Oscar Hagberg, the Midshipmen compiled a 7–1–1 record, shut out three opponents and outscored all opponents by a combined score of 220 to 65. Navy was ranked No. 3 in the final AP poll.

== Schedule ==
Date	Opponent	Rank	Site	Result	Attendance	Source
September 29	Villanova		Thompson Stadium; Annapolis, MD	W 49–0		
October 6	at Duke		Duke Stadium; Durham, NC	W 21–0	44,000	
October 13	Penn State	No. 2	Thompson Stadium; Annapolis, MD	W 28–0	16,148	
October 20	Georgia Tech	No. 2	Municipal Stadium; Baltimore, MD	W 20–6	54,875	
October 27	at No. 7 Penn	No. 3	Franklin Field; Philadelphia, PA	W 14–7	73,000	
November 3	vs. No. 2 Notre Dame	No. 3	Municipal Stadium; Cleveland, OH (rivalry)	T 6–6	82,020	
November 10	No. 7 Michigan	No. 4	Municipal Stadium; Baltimore, MD	W 33–7	56,880	
November 17	Wisconsin	No. 2	Municipal Stadium; Baltimore, MD	W 36–7		
December 1	vs. No. 1 Army	No. 2	Philadelphia Municipal Stadium; Philadelphia, PA (Army–Navy Game)	L 13–32	102,000	
Rankings from AP Poll released prior to the game

== Rankings ==
Ranking movements Legend: ██ Increase in ranking ██ Decrease in ranking ( ) = First-place votes
	Week								
Poll	1	2	3	4	5	6	7	8	Final
AP	2 (14)	2 (14)	3 (5)	3 (3)	4 (3)	2 (5)	2	2	2
