= 1945 North Carolina Tar Heels football team =

American college football season

1945 North Carolina Tar Heels football
- Conference: Southern Conference
- Record: 5–5 (2–2 SoCon)
- Head coach: Carl Snavely (3rd season)
- Captains: Bill Voris; Bill Walker
- Home stadium: Kenan Memorial Stadium

1945 Southern Conference football standings
	Conf.					Overall
Team	W		L		T	W		L		T
No. 13 Duke $	4	–	0	–	0	6	–	2	–	0
No. 19 Wake Forest	4	–	1	–	1	5	–	3	–	1
William & Mary	4	–	2	–	0	6	–	3	–	0
Clemson	2	–	1	–	1	6	–	3	–	1
Maryland	3	–	2	–	0	6	–	2	–	1
VMI	3	–	2	–	0	5	–	4	–	0
North Carolina	2	–	2	–	0	5	–	4	–	0
NC State	2	–	4	–	0	3	–	6	–	0
VPI	2	–	5	–	0	2	–	6	–	0
South Carolina	0	–	3	–	2	2	–	4	–	3
Richmond	0	–	4	–	0	2	–	6	–	0
$ – Conference champion; Rankings from AP Poll

The 1945 North Carolina Tar Heels football team represented the University of North Carolina at Chapel Hill during the 1945 college football season. The Tar Heels were led by third-year head coach Carl Snavely, his first at UNC since 1935 (he coached at Cornell from 1936 to 1944). North Carolina played their home games at Kenan Memorial Stadium and competed as a member of the Southern Conference.

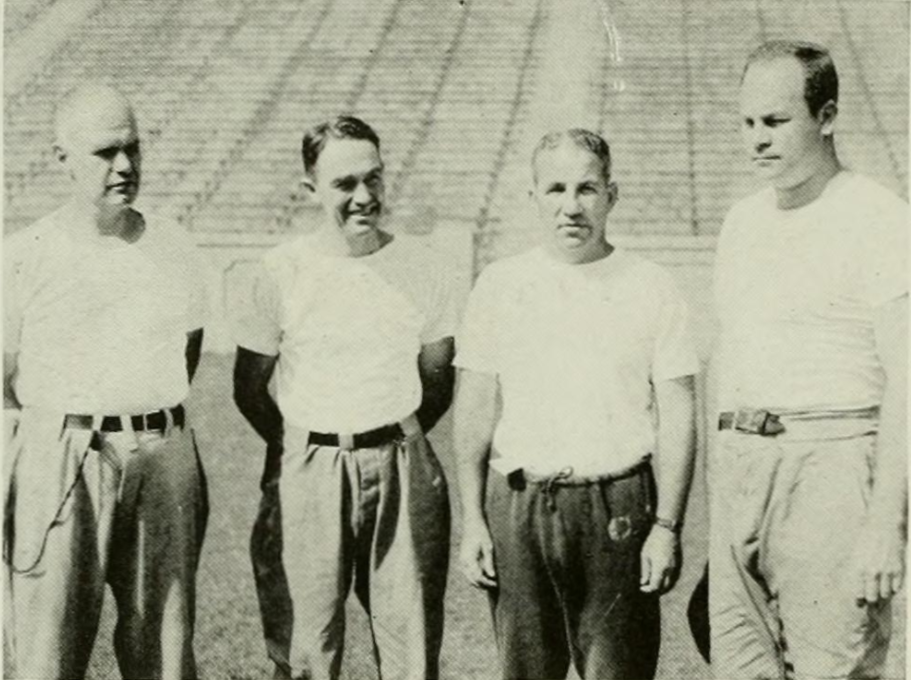
Coaching staff, from left to right: Head Coach Carl Snavely, Max Reed, Russ Murphy, and Chief Gill

== Schedule ==
Date	Time	Opponent	Site	Result	Attendance	Source
September 22	2:00 p.m.	at Camp Lee*	Nowak Field; Camp Lee, VA	W 6–0	10,000–12,000	
September 29	2:30 p.m.	Georgia Tech*	Kenan Memorial Stadium; Chapel Hill, NC	L 14–20	22,000	
October 6	2:30 p.m.	vs. VPI	Victory Stadium; Roanoke, VA	W 14–0	6,000	
October 13	2:00 p.m.	at No. 11 Penn*	Franklin Field; Philadelphia, PA	L 0–49	55,000	
October 20	2:30 p.m	Cherry Point Marines*	Kenan Memorial Stadium; Chapel Hill, NC	W 20–14	7,000	
November 3	3:30 p.m.	at Tennessee*	Shields–Watkins Field; Knoxville, TN	L 6–20	15,000	
November 10	2:00 p.m.	vs. William & Mary	Foreman Field; Norfolk, VA	W 6–0	10,000	
November 17	2:00 p.m.	Wake Forest	Kenan Memorial Stadium; Chapel Hill, NC (rivalry)	L 13–14	20,000	
November 24	2:30 p.m.	at No. 15 Duke	Duke Stadium; Durham, NC (rivalry)	L 7–14	44,000	
December 1	2:00 p.m.	No. 20 Virginia*	Kenan Memorial Stadium; Chapel Hill, NC (South's Oldest Rivalry)	W 27–18	12,000–15,000	
*Non-conference game; Rankings from AP Poll released prior to the game; All times are in Eastern time
