= 1945 Wake Forest Demon Deacons football team =

American college football season

1945 Wake Forest Demon Deacons football

Gator Bowl, W 26–14 vs. South Carolina
- Conference: Southern Conference

Ranking
- AP: No. 19
- Record: 5–3–1 (4–1–1 SoCon)
- Head coach: Peahead Walker (9th season)
- Captain: Nick Sacrinty
- Home stadium: Groves Stadium

1945 Southern Conference football standings
	Conf.					Overall
Team	W		L		T	W		L		T
No. 13 Duke $	4	–	0	–	0	6	–	2	–	0
No. 19 Wake Forest	4	–	1	–	1	5	–	3	–	1
William & Mary	4	–	2	–	0	6	–	3	–	0
Clemson	2	–	1	–	1	6	–	3	–	1
Maryland	3	–	2	–	0	6	–	2	–	1
VMI	3	–	2	–	0	5	–	4	–	0
North Carolina	2	–	2	–	0	5	–	4	–	0
NC State	2	–	4	–	0	3	–	6	–	0
VPI	2	–	5	–	0	2	–	6	–	0
South Carolina	0	–	3	–	2	2	–	4	–	3
Richmond	0	–	4	–	0	2	–	6	–	0
$ – Conference champion; Rankings from AP Poll

The 1945 Wake Forest Demon Deacons football team was an American football team that represented Wake Forest University during the 1945 college football season. In its ninth season under head coach Peahead Walker, the team compiled a 5–3–1 record, finished in second place in the Southern Conference, defeated South Carolina in the first Gator Bowl game, and was ranked No. 19 in the final AP Poll.

The team defeated No. 16 Clemson in the final game of the regular season, and its three losses were to teams that were ranked in the final AP Poll: No. 1 Army, No. 13 Duke, and No. 14 Tennessee.

Five Wake Forest players were recognized the Associated Press on the 1946 All-Southern Conference football team: backs Nick Sacrinty (first team), Richard Brinkley (second team), and Nick Ognivich (third team); end John O'Quinn (third team); and guard Robert Leonetti (third team).

The team played its home games at Groves Stadium in Wake Forest, North Carolina.

== Schedule ==
Date	Opponent	Rank	Site	Result	Attendance	Source
September 29	at Tennessee*		Shields–Watkins Field; Knoxville, TN	L 6–7	15,000	
October 6	at Army*		Michie Stadium; West Point, NY	L 0–54	10,000	
October 13	No. 13 Duke		Groves Stadium; Wake Forest, NC (rivalry)	L 19–26	20,000	
October 20	at NC State		Riddick Stadium; Raleigh, NC (rivalry)	W 19–18	17,000	
November 3	Presbyterian*		Groves Stadium; Wake Forest, NC	W 53–0	1,500	
November 17	at North Carolina		Kenan Memorial Stadium; Chapel Hill, NC (rivalry)	W 14–13	20,000	
November 22	vs. South Carolina		American Legion Memorial Stadium; Charlotte, NC	T 13–13	16,000	
December 1	at No. 18 Clemson		Memorial Stadium; Clemson, SC	W 13–6	15,000	
January 1, 1946	vs. South Carolina	No. 19	Fairfield Stadium; Jacksonville, FL (Gator Bowl)	W 26–14	12,000	
*Non-conference game; Rankings from AP Poll released prior to the game

== Rankings ==
Ranking movements Legend: ██ Increase in ranking ██ Decrease in ranking — = Not ranked
	Week								
Poll	1	2	3	4	5	6	7	8	Final
AP	—	—	—	—	—	—	—	—	19
