= 1945 Ole Miss Rebels football team =

American college football season

1945 Ole Miss Rebels football
- Conference: Southeastern Conference
- Record: 4–5 (3–3 SEC)
- Head coach: Harry Mehre (7th season)
- Captain: Bob McCain
- Home stadium: Hemingway Stadium

1945 Southeastern Conference football standings
	Conf.					Overall
Team	W		L		T	W		L		T
No. 2 Alabama $	6	–	0	–	0	10	–	0	–	0
No. 14 Tennessee	3	–	1	–	0	8	–	1	–	0
No. 15 LSU	5	–	2	–	0	7	–	2	–	0
No. 18 Georgia	4	–	2	–	0	9	–	2	–	0
Ole Miss	3	–	3	–	0	4	–	5	–	0
Georgia Tech	2	–	2	–	0	4	–	6	–	0
Mississippi State	2	–	3	–	0	6	–	3	–	0
Auburn	2	–	3	–	0	5	–	5	–	0
Vanderbilt	2	–	4	–	0	3	–	6	–	0
Florida	1	–	3	–	1	4	–	5	–	1
Tulane	1	–	3	–	1	2	–	6	–	1
Kentucky	0	–	5	–	0	2	–	8	–	0
$ – Conference champion; Rankings from AP Poll

The 1945 Ole Miss Rebels football team was an American football team that represented the University of Mississippi (Ole Miss) as a member of the Southeastern Conference (SEC) during the 1945 college football season. In their seventh year under head coach Harry Mehre, the Rebels compiled an overall record of 4–5, with a conference record of 3–3, and finished fifth in the SEC.

== Schedule ==
Date	Opponent	Site	Result	Attendance	Source
September 21	vs. Kentucky	Crump Stadium; Memphis, TN	W 21–7	18,000	
September 29	vs. Florida	Fairfield Stadium; Jacksonville, FL	L 13–26	12,000	
October 6	at Vanderbilt	Dudley Field; Nashville, TN (rivalry)	W 14–7	8,000	
October 13	Louisiana Tech*	Hemingway Stadium; Oxford, MS	W 26–21	3,500	
October 27	vs. Arkansas*	Crump Stadium; Memphis, TN (rivalry)	L 0–19	23,000	
November 3	at No. 17 LSU	Tiger Stadium; Baton Rouge, LA (rivalry)	L 13–32	20,000	
November 10	vs. Tennessee	Crump Stadium; Memphis, TN (rivalry)	L 0–34	6,000	
November 24	at No. 20 Mississippi State	Scott Field; Starkville, MS (Egg Bowl)	W 7–6	18,000	
November 29	at Chattanooga*	Chamberlain Field; Chattanooga, TN	L 6–31	7,000	
*Non-conference game; Rankings from AP Poll released prior to the game
