= 1945 Clemson Tigers football team =

American college football season

1945 Clemson Tigers football
- Conference: Southern Conference
- Record: 6–3–1 (2–1–1 SoCon)
- Head coach: Frank Howard (6th season)
- Captain: Ralph Jenkins
- Home stadium: Memorial Stadium

1945 Southern Conference football standings
	Conf.					Overall
Team	W		L		T	W		L		T
No. 13 Duke $	4	–	0	–	0	6	–	2	–	0
No. 19 Wake Forest	4	–	1	–	1	5	–	3	–	1
William & Mary	4	–	2	–	0	6	–	3	–	0
Clemson	2	–	1	–	1	6	–	3	–	1
Maryland	3	–	2	–	0	6	–	2	–	1
VMI	3	–	2	–	0	5	–	4	–	0
North Carolina	2	–	2	–	0	5	–	4	–	0
NC State	2	–	4	–	0	3	–	6	–	0
VPI	2	–	5	–	0	2	–	6	–	0
South Carolina	0	–	3	–	2	2	–	4	–	3
Richmond	0	–	4	–	0	2	–	6	–	0
$ – Conference champion; Rankings from AP Poll

The 1945 Clemson Tigers football team was an American football team that represented Clemson College during the 1945 college football season. In its sixth season under head coach Frank Howard, the team compiled a 6–3–1 record (2–1–1 against conference opponents), finished fourth in the conference, and outscored opponents by a total of 211 to 73. The team played its home games at Memorial Stadium in Clemson, South Carolina.

Center Ralph Jenkins was the team captain. The team's statistical leaders included tailback Marion Butler with 239 passing yards, fullback Dewey Quinn with 392 rushing yards, and Butler and fullback Jim Reynolds with 30 points scored (5 touchdowns each).

Tackle Bob Turner and center Ralph Jenkins were selected as first-team players on the 1945 All-Southern Conference football team.

== Schedule ==
Date	Opponent	Rank	Site	Result	Attendance	Source
September 22	Presbyterian*		Memorial Stadium; Clemson, SC	W 76–0	10,000	
September 29	at Georgia*		Sanford Stadium; Athens, GA (rivalry)	L 0–20	10,000	
October 6	at NC State		Riddick Stadium; Raleigh, NC (rivalry)	W 13–0	5,000	
October 13	Pensacola NAS		Memorial Stadium; Clemson, SC	W 7–6	5,000	
October 25	at South Carolina		Carolina Stadium; Columbia, SC (rivalry)	T 0–0	25,000	
November 2	at Miami (FL)*		Burdine Stadium; Miami, FL	L 6–7	20,982	
November 10	VPI		Memorial Stadium; Clemson, SC	W 35–0		
November 17	at Tulane*		Tulane Stadium; New Orleans, LA	W 47–20	18,000	
November 24	at Georgia Tech*		Grant Field; Atlanta, GA (rivalry)	W 21–7	20,000	
December 1	Wake Forest	No. 18	Memorial Stadium; Clemson, SC	L 6–13	15,000	
*Non-conference game; Rankings from AP Poll released prior to the game

== Rankings ==
Ranking movements Legend: ██ Increase in ranking ██ Decrease in ranking — = Not ranked
	Week								
Poll	1	2	3	4	5	6	7	8	Final
AP	—	—	—	—	—	—	—	18	—
