= Fred Grant (gridiron football) =

American football player (1925–1993)

Profile
- Position: Fullback

Personal information
- Born: January 20, 1925; Christiansburg, Virginia, U.S.
- Died: August 3, 1993 (aged 68); Atlanta, Georgia, U.S.

Career information
- High school: Christiansburg (VA)
- College: Wake Forest (1943); Alabama (1944–1946)
- NFL draft: 1945: 22nd round, 220th overall pick

Career history

Playing
- Regina Roughriders (1947)

Coaching
- Regina/Saskatchewan Roughriders (1947–1950) Head coach

Awards and highlights
- 1943 Southern Conference scoring leader; 1945 Southeastern Conference scoring leader; 1946 Rose Bowl champion

Frederick W. Grant Jr. (January 20, 1925 – August 3, 1993) was an American football player and coach who played fullback for the Alabama Crimson Tide football team and was the head coach of the Saskatchewan Roughriders.

== Early life ==
Grant was born on January 20, 1925, in Christiansburg, Virginia. His parents, Fred and Zenith Grant, owned Grant's Tavern in Christiansburg.

== Playing ==
Grant was a standout athlete at Christiansburg High School and played for the Wake Forest Demon Deacons in 1943. In his only season at Wake Forest, Grant led the Southern Conference in scoring. Grant transferred to the University of Alabama in 1944. On November 18, 1944, he ran back an interception for an 87-yard touchdown to help the Tide defeat the undefeated Mississippi State Maroons 19–0. The following season he led the Southeastern Conference in scoring with 11 touchdowns and was a member of the team that won the 1946 Rose Bowl.

== Coaching ==
Grant joined the Regina Roughriders in 1947 and was made the team's head coach towards the end of the season. He was retained for the 1948, 1949, and 1950 seasons and compiled an overall record of 21–22.

== Later life ==
While coaching in Saskatchewan, Grant continued his studies at the University of Alabama during the offseason. After leaving football he resided in Norcross, Georgia and worked as a design engineer and food facilities consultant. He died on August 3, 1993, at St. Joseph's Hospital in Atlanta after a brief illness.

== Head coaching record ==
Team	Year	Regular season					Postseason			
Team	Year	Won	Lost	Ties	Win %	Finish	Won	Lost	Ties	Result
REG	1947	2	1	0	.667	3rd in WIFU	0	0	0	Missed playoffs
REG	1948	3	9	0	.250	2nd in WIFU	0	1	1	Lost in WIFU Finals
REG	1949	9	5	0	.643	2nd in WIFU	1	1	0	Lost in WIFU Finals
SSK	1950	7	7	0	.500	2nd in WIFU	0	1	0	Lost in WIFU Semifinals
Total		21	22	0	.488		1	3	1	
