= 1945 Georgia Tech Yellow Jackets football team =

American college football season

1945 Georgia Tech Yellow Jackets football
- Conference: Southeastern Conference
- Record: 4–6 (2–2 SEC)
- Head coach: Bobby Dodd (1st season)
- Captain: Paul Duke
- Home stadium: Grant Field

1945 Southeastern Conference football standings
	Conf.					Overall
Team	W		L		T	W		L		T
No. 2 Alabama $	6	–	0	–	0	10	–	0	–	0
No. 14 Tennessee	3	–	1	–	0	8	–	1	–	0
No. 15 LSU	5	–	2	–	0	7	–	2	–	0
No. 18 Georgia	4	–	2	–	0	9	–	2	–	0
Ole Miss	3	–	3	–	0	4	–	5	–	0
Georgia Tech	2	–	2	–	0	4	–	6	–	0
Mississippi State	2	–	3	–	0	6	–	3	–	0
Auburn	2	–	3	–	0	5	–	5	–	0
Vanderbilt	2	–	4	–	0	3	–	6	–	0
Florida	1	–	3	–	1	4	–	5	–	1
Tulane	1	–	3	–	1	2	–	6	–	1
Kentucky	0	–	5	–	0	2	–	8	–	0
$ – Conference champion; Rankings from AP Poll

The 1945 Georgia Tech Yellow Jackets football team was an American football team that represented Georgia Tech as a member of the Southeastern Conference (SEC) during the 1945 college football season. In their first year under head coach Bobby Dodd, the Yellow Jackets compiled an overall record of 4–6, with a conference record of 2–2, and finished sixth in the SEC.

== Schedule ==
Date	Opponent	Site	Result	Attendance	Source
September 29	at North Carolina*	Kenan Memorial Stadium; Chapel Hill, NC	W 20–14	25,000	
October 6	Notre Dame*	Grant Field; Atlanta, GA (rivalry)	L 7–40	30,157	
October 13	Howard (AL)*	Grant Field; Atlanta, GA	W 43–0	15,000	
October 20	at No. 2 Navy*	Municipal Stadium; Baltimore, MD	L 6–20	54,875	
October 27	Auburn	Grant Field; Atlanta, GA (rivalry)	W 20–7	30,000	
November 3	No. 18 Duke*	Grant Field; Atlanta, GA	L 6–14	30,000	
November 10	at Tulane	Tulane Stadium; New Orleans, LA	W 41–7	30,000	
November 17	LSU	Grant Field; Atlanta, GA	L 7–9	28,000	
November 24	Clemson*	Grant Field; Atlanta, GA (rivalry)	L 7–21	20,000	
December 1	Georgia	Grant Field; Atlanta, GA (rivalry)	L 0–33	30,000	
*Non-conference game; Rankings from AP Poll released prior to the game
