= 1945 South Carolina Gamecocks football team =

American college football season

1945 South Carolina Gamecocks football

Gator Bowl, L 14–26 vs. Wake Forest
- Conference: Southern Conference
- Record: 2–4–3 (0–2–2 SoCon)
- Head coach: John D. McMillan (1st season)
- Captain: Bryant Meeks
- Home stadium: Carolina Municipal Stadium

1945 Southern Conference football standings
	Conf.					Overall
Team	W		L		T	W		L		T
No. 13 Duke $	4	–	0	–	0	6	–	2	–	0
No. 19 Wake Forest	4	–	1	–	1	5	–	3	–	1
William & Mary	4	–	2	–	0	6	–	3	–	0
Clemson	2	–	1	–	1	6	–	3	–	1
Maryland	3	–	2	–	0	6	–	2	–	1
VMI	3	–	2	–	0	5	–	4	–	0
North Carolina	2	–	2	–	0	5	–	4	–	0
NC State	2	–	4	–	0	3	–	6	–	0
VPI	2	–	5	–	0	2	–	6	–	0
South Carolina	0	–	3	–	2	2	–	4	–	3
Richmond	0	–	4	–	0	2	–	6	–	0
$ – Conference champion; Rankings from AP Poll

The 1945 South Carolina Gamecocks football team represented the University of South Carolina as a member of the Southern Conference (SoCon) during the 1945 college football season. In their first and only season under head coach John D. McMillan, the Gamecocks compiled an overall record of 2–4–3 with a mark of 0–2–2 in conference play, placing tenth in the SoCon. South Carolina was invited to the inaugural Gator Bowl, also the first bowl game in program history, where they lost to Wake Forest.

== Schedule ==
Date	Time	Opponent	Site	Result	Attendance	Source
September 22		at Duke	Duke Stadium; Durham, NC	L 0–60	12,000	
September 29		Presbyterian*	Carolina Stadium; Columbia, SC	W 40–0	6,000	
October 6	3:00 p.m.	Camp Blanding*	Carolina Stadium; Columbia, SC	W 20–6	7,000	
October 13		at No. 7 Alabama	Cramton Bowl; Montgomery, AL	L 0–55	14,000	
October 25		Clemson	Carolina Stadium; Columbia, SC (rivalry)	T 0–0	25,000	
November 9		at Miami (FL)*	Burdine Stadium; Miami, FL	T 13–13	18,056	
November 22		vs. Wake Forest	American Legion Memorial Stadium; Charlotte, NC	T 13–13	16,000	
December 1		Maryland	Carolina Stadium; Columbia, SC	L 13–19	8,000	
January 1, 1946		vs. No. 19 Wake Forest	Fairfield Stadium; Jacksonville, FL (Gator Bowl)	L 14–26	12,000	
*Non-conference game; Rankings from AP Poll released prior to the game; All times are in Eastern time
