= Ray Pelfrey =

American football player (1928–2017)

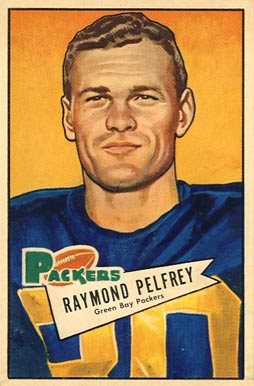
- Pelfrey on a 1952 Bowman football card

No. 8, 83, 85, 80, 74
- Positions: End, halfback

Personal information
- Born: January 11, 1928; Sardinia, Ohio, U.S.
- Died: April 1, 2017 (aged 89); Sparks, Nevada, U.S.
- Listed height: 6 ft 0 in (1.83 m)
- Listed weight: 190 lb (86 kg)

Career information
- High school: Portsmouth (Portsmouth, Ohio)
- College: Auburn (1946-1947); Eastern Kentucky (1949-1950)
- NFL draft: 1951: 17th round, 197th overall pick

Career history
- Green Bay Packers (1951–1952); Chicago Cardinals (1952); Dallas Texans (1952); New York Giants (1953); Winnipeg Blue Bombers (1954)

Career NFL statistics
- Receptions: 75
- Receiving yards: 959
- Touchdowns: 10
- Stats at Pro Football Reference

Ray Pelfrey (January 11, 1928 – April 1, 2017) was a professional American football wide receiver who played for three seasons for the Green Bay Packers, Chicago Cardinals, Dallas Texans, and New York Giants.

In October 1952, the Cardinals released the linebacker Denver Mills after a single game to make room on their roster for Pelfrey.
