= 1945 LSU Tigers football team =

American college football season

1945 LSU Tigers football
- Conference: Southeastern Conference

Ranking
- AP: No. 15
- Record: 7–2 (5–2 SEC)
- Head coach: Bernie Moore (11th season)
- Offensive scheme: T formation
- Home stadium: Tiger Stadium

1945 Southeastern Conference football standings
	Conf.					Overall
Team	W		L		T	W		L		T
No. 2 Alabama $	6	–	0	–	0	10	–	0	–	0
No. 14 Tennessee	3	–	1	–	0	8	–	1	–	0
No. 15 LSU	5	–	2	–	0	7	–	2	–	0
No. 18 Georgia	4	–	2	–	0	9	–	2	–	0
Ole Miss	3	–	3	–	0	4	–	5	–	0
Georgia Tech	2	–	2	–	0	4	–	6	–	0
Mississippi State	2	–	3	–	0	6	–	3	–	0
Auburn	2	–	3	–	0	5	–	5	–	0
Vanderbilt	2	–	4	–	0	3	–	6	–	0
Florida	1	–	3	–	1	4	–	5	–	1
Tulane	1	–	3	–	1	2	–	6	–	1
Kentucky	0	–	5	–	0	2	–	8	–	0
$ – Conference champion; Rankings from AP Poll

The 1945 LSU Tigers football team was an American football team that represented Louisiana State University (LSU) as a member of the Southeastern Conference (SEC) during the 1945 college football season. In their 11th year under head coach Bernie Moore, the Tigers compiled an overall record of 7–2, with a conference record of 5–2, and finished third in the SEC.

== Schedule ==
Date	Opponent	Rank	Site	Result	Attendance	Source
September 29	Rice*		Tiger Stadium; Baton Rouge, LA	W 42–0	28,000	
October 6	Alabama		Tiger Stadium; Baton Rouge, LA (rivalry)	L 7–26	40,000	
October 13	No. 17 Texas A&M*		Tiger Stadium; Baton Rouge, LA (rivalry)	W 31–12	25,000	
October 20	at No. 12 Georgia		Sanford Stadium; Athens, GA	W 32–0	25,000	
October 27	Vanderbilt	No. 13	Tiger Stadium; Baton Rouge, LA	W 39–7	22,000	
November 3	Ole Miss	No. 17	Tiger Stadium; Baton Rouge, LA (rivalry)	W 32–13	20,000	
November 10	Mississippi State^{†}	No. 14	Tiger Stadium; Baton Rouge, LA (rivalry)	L 20–27	35,000	
November 17	at Georgia Tech		Grant Field; Atlanta, GA	W 9–7	28,000	
December 1	at Tulane		Tulane Stadium; New Orleans, LA (Battle for the Rag)	W 33–0	52,644	
*Non-conference game; ^{†}Homecoming; Rankings from AP Poll released prior to the game

== Rankings ==
Ranking movements Legend: ██ Increase in ranking ██ Decrease in ranking — = Not ranked
	Week								
Poll	1	2	3	4	5	6	7	8	Final
AP	—	—	13	17	14	—	19	—	15
