= 1945 All-Southern Conference football team =

The 1945 All-Southern Conference football team consists of American football players chosen by coaches and sports writers on behalf of the Associated Press (AP) and United Press (UP) as the best at each position from the Southern Conference during the 1945 college football season.

== All-Southern Conference selections ==
=== Backs ===
- Howie Turner, NC State (AP-1, UP-1 [qb])
- Nick Sacrinty, Wake Forest (AP-1, UP-1 [hb)
- George Clark, Duke (AP-1, UP-1 [hb])
- Lynn Chewning, VMI (AP-1, UP-1 [fb])
- T. Korzcowski, William & Mary (AP-2)
- Gordon Carver, Duke (AP-2, UP-2)
- Bobby Thomason, VMI (AP-2)
- Rock Brinkley, Wake Forest (AP-2, UP-2)
- John Kniza, Duke (UP-2)
- Marion Butler, Clemson (UP-2)

=== Ends ===
- Kelley Mote, Duke (AP-1, UP-1)
- Dave Harris, Wake Forest (AP-1, UP-1)
- Denver Mills, William & Mary (AP-2, UP-2)
- Lum Edwards (AP-2, UP-2)

=== Tackles ===
- Knox Ramsey, William & Mary (AP-1)
- Malachi Mill, VMI (AP-1)
- Robert Turner, Clemson (UP-1)
- Ed Sharkey, Duke (UP-1)
- Ted Hazelwood, North Carolina (AP-2)
- Ross Orr, Virginia Tech (AP-2)
- Bull Cagle, Clemson (UP-2)
- Ted Marshall (UP-2)

=== Guards ===
- Ernie Knotts, Duke (AP-1, UP-1)
- Charles Garrison, Wake Forest (AP-1, UP-2)
- Doc Holloway, William & Mary (AP-2)
- Phil Ball, South Carolina (AP-2, UP-1)
- Footsie Ward, Clemson (UP-2)

=== Centers ===
- Ralph Jenkins, Clemson (AP-1, UP-1)
- Dick Foreman, Wake Forest (AP-2, UP-2)

== Key ==
AP = Associated Press UP = United Press

== See also ==
- 1945 College Football All-America Team
