= 1945 Virginia Cavaliers football team =

American college football season

1945 Virginia Cavaliers football
- Conference: Independent
- Record: 7–2
- Head coach: Frank Murray (9th season)
- Captains: James Walker; John Duda
- Home stadium: Scott Stadium

1945 Southern college football independents records
	Conf.			Overall
Team	W	L	T	W		L		T
Miami (FL)		–		9	–	1	–	1
No. 3 Navy		–		7	–	1	–	1
Louisiana Normal (Grambling)		–		9	–	2	–	0
Virginia		–		7	–	2	–	0
Chattanooga		–		5	–	3	–	0
Jacksonville State		–		1	–	1	–	0
West Virginia		–		2	–	6	–	1
Tennessee Tech		–		1	–	8	–	0
Howard (AL)		–		0	–	5	–	0
Rankings from AP Poll

The 1945 Virginia Cavaliers football team represented the University of Virginia during the 1945 college football season. The Cavaliers were led by ninth-year head coach Frank Murray and played their home games at Scott Stadium in Charlottesville, Virginia. They competed as independents, finishing with a record of 7–2. On October 8, 1945, Virginia made their first appearance in the AP Poll in school history when they were ranked 20th in the year's first poll. They dropped from the poll the following week, but reentered November 5 as they continued a seven-game win-streak. The Cavaliers did not finish ranked, however, being knocked from the polls after season-ending losses to rivals Maryland and North Carolina. Their first ranked finish would come in 1951. Murray left the team following the season to return to coaching at Marquette, where he had coached from 1927 to 1936. He ended his career at Virginia as the school's longest-serving and winningest coach.

== Schedule ==
Date	Opponent	Rank	Site	Result	Attendance	Source
September 22	Coast Guard		Scott Stadium; Charlottesville, VA	W 39–0	4,500	
September 29	vs. NC State		Foreman Field; Norfolk, VA	W 26–6	20,000	
October 6	vs. VMI		City Stadium; Lynchburg, VA	W 40–7	8,000	
October 27	vs. VPI		Victory Stadium; Roanoke, VA (rivalry)	W 31–13	12,000	
November 3	vs. West Virginia		Laidley Field; Charleston, WV	W 13–7	9,000	
November 10	Richmond^{†}	No. 15	Scott Stadium; Charlottesville, VA	W 45–0	7,000	
November 17	Oceana NAS	No. 13	Scott Stadium; Charlottesville, VA	W 40–0	6,500	
November 24	vs. Maryland	No. 13	Griffith Stadium; Washington, DC (rivalry)	L 13–19	15,000	
December 1	at North Carolina	No. 20	Kenan Memorial Stadium; Chapel Hill, NC (South's Oldest Rivalry)	L 18–27	12,000–15,000	
^{†}Homecoming; Rankings from AP Poll released prior to the game

== Rankings ==
Ranking movements Legend: ██ Increase in ranking ██ Decrease in ranking — = Not ranked т = Tied with team above or below
	Week								
Poll	1	2	3	4	5	6	7	8	Final
AP	20т	—	—	—	15	13	13	20	—
