= 1945 Florida Gators football team =

American college football season

1945 Florida Gators football
- Conference: Southeastern Conference
- Record: 4–5–1 (1–3–1 SEC)
- Head coach: Tom Lieb (5th season)
- Captain: Hugo Miller
- Home stadium: Florida Field

1945 Southeastern Conference football standings
	Conf.					Overall
Team	W		L		T	W		L		T
No. 2 Alabama $	6	–	0	–	0	10	–	0	–	0
No. 14 Tennessee	3	–	1	–	0	8	–	1	–	0
No. 15 LSU	5	–	2	–	0	7	–	2	–	0
No. 18 Georgia	4	–	2	–	0	9	–	2	–	0
Ole Miss	3	–	3	–	0	4	–	5	–	0
Georgia Tech	2	–	2	–	0	4	–	6	–	0
Mississippi State	2	–	3	–	0	6	–	3	–	0
Auburn	2	–	3	–	0	5	–	5	–	0
Vanderbilt	2	–	4	–	0	3	–	6	–	0
Florida	1	–	3	–	1	4	–	5	–	1
Tulane	1	–	3	–	1	2	–	6	–	1
Kentucky	0	–	5	–	0	2	–	8	–	0
$ – Conference champion; Rankings from AP Poll

The 1945 Florida Gators football team represented the University of Florida during the 1945 college football season. The season was the fifth and last for Tom Lieb as the head coach of the Florida Gators football team. The 1945 backfield was made up entirely of freshmen.

Among the season's highlights was the Gators' 26–13 neutral site victory over the Ole Miss Rebels played in Jacksonville. The Gators also split a pair of games against teams from two U.S. military training bases. Lieb's 1945 Florida Gators finished with a 4–5–1 overall record and a 1–3–1 record in the Southeastern Conference (SEC), placing ninth among twelve SEC teams.

== Schedule ==
Date	Time	Opponent	Site	Result	Attendance	Source
September 22	8:00 p.m.	Camp Blanding*	Florida Field; Gainesville, FL	W 31–2	7,000	
September 29		vs. Ole Miss	Fairfield Stadium; Jacksonville, FL	W 26–13	12,000	
October 6		at Tulane	Tulane Stadium; New Orleans, LA	T 6–6	20,000	
October 13		Vanderbilt^{†}	Florida Field; Gainesville, FL	L 0–7	17,000	
October 19		at Miami (FL)*	Burdine Stadium; Miami, FL (rivalry)	L 6–7	27,000	
October 27		Southwestern Louisiana*	Florida Field; Gainesville, FL	W 45–0		
November 3		at Auburn	Auburn Stadium; Auburn, AL (rivalry)	L 0–19	10,000	
November 10		vs. Georgia	Fairfield Stadium; Jacksonville, FL (rivalry)	L 0–34	21,000	
November 17		Presbyterian*	Florida Field; Gainesville, FL	W 41–0	3,000	
November 24	2:00 p.m.	at Little Creek*	Forman Field; Norfolk, VA	L 0–12	5,000	
*Non-conference game; ^{†}Homecoming; All times are in Eastern time

== Postseason ==
After Lieb's coaching contract was not renewed, he became the track & field coach and an assistant football coach at the University of Alabama, where his old Notre Dame teammate Frank Thomas was the head coach of the Alabama Crimson Tide.
