= Rebel Steiner =

American football player (1927–2014)

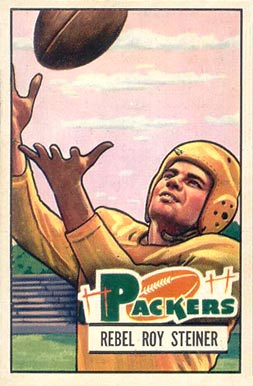
- Steiner on a 1951 Bowman football card

No. 74
- Position: Defensive back

Personal information
- Born: August 27, 1927; Birmingham, Alabama, U.S.
- Died: October 18, 2014 (aged 87); Birmingham, Alabama, U.S.
- Listed height: 6 ft 0 in (1.83 m)
- Listed weight: 185 lb (84 kg)

Career information
- High school: Ensley (Birmingham)
- College: Alabama
- NFL draft: 1949: 12th round, 114th overall pick

Career history
- Green Bay Packers (1950–1951)

Awards and highlights
- First-team All-SEC (1945); Second-team All-SEC (1948)

Career NFL statistics
- Interceptions: 10
- Total touchdowns: 1
- Stats at Pro Football Reference

Rebel Roy Steiner Sr. (August 27, 1927 – October 18, 2014) was an American football player who played offensive end for the University of Alabama football team, including the 1945 squad known as the "War Babies," who went undefeated before beating USC in Alabama's last appearance in the 1946 Rose Bowl. He also played basketball and baseball for the Tide. Steiner was drafted by the Chicago Bears but was called into military service in 1946. He played football with the U.S. Army's 1st Cavalry Division in Tokyo before returning to Alabama to play for the Tide. Steiner later suited up as a defensive back for the Green Bay Packers in 1950 and 1951, intercepting 10 passes during his brief career. One of the interceptions was a 94-yard touchdown return against the rival Chicago Bears. A knee injury ended Steiner's tenure at Green Bay. He went on to play semi-pro baseball. Following his athletic career, Steiner worked for the R.L. Zeigler, Inc. meatpacking company.
