= 1945 Richmond Spiders football team =

American college football season

1945 Richmond Spiders football
- Conference: Southern Conference
- Record: 2–6 (0–4 SoCon)
- Head coach: George Hope (1st season)
- Captain: Jack Null
- Home stadium: City Stadium

1945 Southern Conference football standings
	Conf.					Overall
Team	W		L		T	W		L		T
No. 13 Duke $	4	–	0	–	0	6	–	2	–	0
No. 19 Wake Forest	4	–	1	–	1	5	–	3	–	1
William & Mary	4	–	2	–	0	6	–	3	–	0
Clemson	2	–	1	–	1	6	–	3	–	1
Maryland	3	–	2	–	0	6	–	2	–	1
VMI	3	–	2	–	0	5	–	4	–	0
North Carolina	2	–	2	–	0	5	–	4	–	0
NC State	2	–	4	–	0	3	–	6	–	0
VPI	2	–	5	–	0	2	–	6	–	0
South Carolina	0	–	3	–	2	2	–	4	–	3
Richmond	0	–	4	–	0	2	–	6	–	0
$ – Conference champion; Rankings from AP Poll

The 1945 Richmond Spiders football team was an American football team that represented the University of Richmond as a member of the Southern Conference (SoCon) during the 1945 college football season. In their first season under head coach George Hope, Richmond compiled a 2–6 record, with a mark of 0–4 in conference play, finishing in eleventh place in the SoCon.

== Schedule ==
Date	Time	Opponent	Site	Result	Attendance	Source
September 29		VMI	City Stadium; Richmond, VA (rivalry)	L 6–40	10,000	
October 6		Maryland	City Stadium; Richmond, VA	L 0–21	< 2,000	
October 20		at Guilford*	Greensboro, NC	W 40–0		
October 27		at Catawba*	Shuford Stadium; Salisbury, NC	L 7–21		
November 3	2:30 p.m.	Oceana NAS*	City Stadium; Richmond, VA	W 28–12	1,000	
November 10		at No. 15 Virginia*	Scott Stadium; Charlottesville, VA	L 0–45	7,000	
November 17		at VPI	Miles Stadium; Blacksburg, VA	L 6–44		
November 22		William & Mary	City Stadium; Richmond, VA (rivalry)	L 0–33	7,500	
*Non-conference game; Rankings from AP Poll released prior to the game; All times are in Eastern time
