= 1945 Louisiana Normal Tigers football team =

American college football season

1945 Louisiana Normal Tigers football

Flower Bowl, W 19–6 vs. Lane
- Conference: Independent
- Record: 9–2
- Head coach: Eddie Robinson (3rd season)

1945 Southern college football independents records
	Conf.			Overall
Team	W	L	T	W		L		T
Miami (FL)		–		9	–	1	–	1
No. 3 Navy		–		7	–	1	–	1
Louisiana Normal (Grambling)		–		9	–	2	–	0
Virginia		–		7	–	2	–	0
Chattanooga		–		5	–	3	–	0
Jacksonville State		–		1	–	1	–	0
West Virginia		–		2	–	6	–	1
Tennessee Tech		–		1	–	8	–	0
Howard (AL)		–		0	–	5	–	0
Rankings from AP Poll

The 1945 Louisiana Normal Tigers football team represented Louisiana Normal—now known as Grambling State University—as an independent during the 1945 college football season. In their third season under head coach Eddie Robinson, the Tigers compiled a 9–2 record. Grambling was invited to the Flower Bowl in Jacksonville, Florida, where the Tigers defeated Lane.

== Schedule ==
Date	Time	Opponent	Site	Result	Attendance	Source
October 6		at Philander Smith	Little Rock, AR	W 25–0		
		Alcorn A&M		W 44–0		
		Butler (TX)		W 53–0		
		Selman AAF		W 26–6		
October 27		Tillotson	Grambling, LA	W 46–0		
November 3		Arkansas AM&N^{†}	Ruston, LA	W 40–8		
November 10		at Alabama A&M	Institute Stadium; Normal, AL	W 50–6		
November 17		at Jackson Barracks	Xavier Stadium; New Orleans, LA	W 20–19		
December 1	1:30 p.m.	at Florida A&M	Sampson-Bragg Field; Tallahassee, FL	L 12–33		
December 8		vs. Texas College	Beaumont, TX	L 7–12		
January 1	1:30 p.m.	vs. Lane	Jacksonville, FL (Flower Bowl)	W 19–6	3,000	
^{†}Homecoming; All times are in Central time
