= 1945 Jacksonville State Eagle Owls football team =

American college football season

1945 Jacksonville State Eagle Owls football
- Conference: Independent
- Record: 1–1
- Head coach: Chester C. Dillon (3rd season)
- Home stadium: College Field

1945 Southern college football independents records
	Conf.			Overall
Team	W	L	T	W		L		T
Miami (FL)		–		9	–	1	–	1
No. 3 Navy		–		7	–	1	–	1
Louisiana Normal (Grambling)		–		9	–	2	–	0
Virginia		–		7	–	2	–	0
Chattanooga		–		5	–	3	–	0
Jacksonville State		–		1	–	1	–	0
West Virginia		–		2	–	6	–	1
Tennessee Tech		–		1	–	8	–	0
Howard (AL)		–		0	–	5	–	0
Rankings from AP Poll

The 1945 Jacksonville State Eagle Owls football team represented Jacksonville State Teachers College (now known as Jacksonville State University) as an independent during the 1945 college football season. Led by third-year head coach Chester C. Dillon, the Eagle Owls compiled an overall record of 1–1.

== Schedule ==
Date	Opponent	Site	Result	Source
October 12	Middle Georgia	College Field; Jacksonville, AL	W 6–0	
November 10	at Marion	Johnson Field; Marion, AL	L 6–13	
