= 1945 Duke Blue Devils football team =

American college football season

1945 Duke Blue Devils football

SoCon Champion
- Conference: Southern Conference

Ranking
- AP: No. 13
- Record: 6–2 (4–0 SoCon)
- Head coach: Eddie Cameron (4th season)
- MVP: Gordon Carver
- Captains: Ernie Knotts; Kelley Mote
- Home stadium: Duke Stadium

1945 Southern Conference football standings
	Conf.					Overall
Team	W		L		T	W		L		T
No. 13 Duke $	4	–	0	–	0	6	–	2	–	0
No. 19 Wake Forest	4	–	1	–	1	5	–	3	–	1
William & Mary	4	–	2	–	0	6	–	3	–	0
Clemson	2	–	1	–	1	6	–	3	–	1
Maryland	3	–	2	–	0	6	–	2	–	1
VMI	3	–	2	–	0	5	–	4	–	0
North Carolina	2	–	2	–	0	5	–	4	–	0
NC State	2	–	4	–	0	3	–	6	–	0
VPI	2	–	5	–	0	2	–	6	–	0
South Carolina	0	–	3	–	2	2	–	4	–	3
Richmond	0	–	4	–	0	2	–	6	–	0
$ – Conference champion; Rankings from AP Poll

The 1945 Duke Blue Devils football team represented the Duke Blue Devils of Duke University during the 1945 college football season.

Duke won the 1945 Southern Conference Championship, and finished the season ranked 13th in the final AP poll.

== Schedule ==
Date	Opponent	Rank	Site	Result	Attendance	Source
September 22	South Carolina		Duke Stadium; Durham, NC	W 60–0	12,000	
September 29	Bogue Field*		Duke Stadium; Durham, NC	W 76–0	2,500	
October 6	Navy*^{†}		Duke Stadium; Durham, NC	L 0–21	44,000	
October 13	at Wake Forest	No. 13	Groves Stadium; Wake Forest, NC (rivalry)	W 26–19	20,000	
October 27	vs. No. 1 Army*	No. 19	Polo Grounds; New York, NY	L 13–48	42,287	
November 3	at Georgia Tech*	No. 18	Grant Field; Atlanta, GA	W 14–6	30,000	
November 10	NC State	No. 16	Duke Stadium; Durham, NC (rivalry)	W 26–13	15,000	
November 24	North Carolina	No. 15	Duke Stadium; Durham, NC (rivalry)	W 14–7	44,000	
*Non-conference game; ^{†}Homecoming; Rankings from AP Poll released prior to the game

== Rankings ==
Ranking movements Legend: ██ Increase in ranking ██ Decrease in ranking т = Tied with team above or below
	Week								
Poll	1	2	3	4	5	6	7	8	Final
AP	13	16	19	18т	16	20	15	11	13
