= 1945 West Virginia Mountaineers football team =

American college football season

1945 West Virginia Mountaineers football
- Conference: Independent
- Record: 2–6–1
- Head coach: Ira Rodgers (9th season)
- Captain: Joe Pozego
- Home stadium: Mountaineer Field

1945 Southern college football independents records
	Conf.			Overall
Team	W	L	T	W		L		T
Miami (FL)		–		9	–	1	–	1
No. 3 Navy		–		7	–	1	–	1
Louisiana Normal (Grambling)		–		9	–	2	–	0
Virginia		–		7	–	2	–	0
Chattanooga		–		5	–	3	–	0
Jacksonville State		–		1	–	1	–	0
West Virginia		–		2	–	6	–	1
Tennessee Tech		–		1	–	8	–	0
Howard (AL)		–		0	–	5	–	0
Rankings from AP Poll

The 1945 West Virginia Mountaineers football team was an American football team that represented West Virginia University as an independent during the 1945 college football season. In its ninth season under head coach Ira Rodgers, the team compiled a 2–6–1 record and was outscored by a total of 126 to 122. The team played its home games at Mountaineer Field in Morgantown, West Virginia. Joe Pozego was the team captain.

== Schedule ==
Date	Opponent	Site	Result	Attendance	Source
September 22	Otterbein	Mountaineer Field; Morgantown, WV	W 42–7	6,000	
September 29	at Pittsburgh	Pitt Stadium; Pittsburgh, PA (rivalry)	L 0–20	7,500–10,000	
October 6	Drexel	Mountaineer Field; Morgantown, WV	W 42–0		
October 12	at Syracuse	Archbold Stadium; Syracuse, NY (rivalry)	L 0–12	5,000	
October 19	at Temple	Temple Stadium; Philadelphia, PA	L 12–28	19,000	
October 27	Maryland	Mountaineer Field; Morgantown, WV (rivalry)	T 13–13	12,000	
November 3	vs. Virginia	Laidley Field; Charleston, WV	L 7–13	9,000	
November 10	Kentucky	Mountaineer Field; Morgantown, WV	L 6–19	7,000	
November 17	Ohio	Mountaineer Field; Morgantown, WV	L 0–14	6,000	
