= 1945 Georgia Bulldogs football team =

American college football season

1945 Georgia Bulldogs football

Oil Bowl champion

Oil Bowl, W 20–6 vs. Tulsa
- Conference: Southeastern Conference

Ranking
- AP: No. 18
- Record: 9–2 (4–2 SEC)
- Head coach: Wally Butts (7th season)
- Home stadium: Sanford Stadium

1945 Southeastern Conference football standings
	Conf.					Overall
Team	W		L		T	W		L		T
No. 2 Alabama $	6	–	0	–	0	10	–	0	–	0
No. 14 Tennessee	3	–	1	–	0	8	–	1	–	0
No. 15 LSU	5	–	2	–	0	7	–	2	–	0
No. 18 Georgia	4	–	2	–	0	9	–	2	–	0
Ole Miss	3	–	3	–	0	4	–	5	–	0
Georgia Tech	2	–	2	–	0	4	–	6	–	0
Mississippi State	2	–	3	–	0	6	–	3	–	0
Auburn	2	–	3	–	0	5	–	5	–	0
Vanderbilt	2	–	4	–	0	3	–	6	–	0
Florida	1	–	3	–	1	4	–	5	–	1
Tulane	1	–	3	–	1	2	–	6	–	1
Kentucky	0	–	5	–	0	2	–	8	–	0
$ – Conference champion; Rankings from AP Poll

The 1945 Georgia Bulldogs football team was an American football team that represented the University of Georgia as a member of the Southeastern Conference (SEC) during the 1945 college football season. In their seventh year under head coach Wally Butts, the Bulldogs compiled an overall record of 9–2, with a conference record of 4–2, and finished fourth in the SEC.

== Schedule ==
Date	Opponent	Rank	Site	Result	Attendance	Source
September 22	Murray State*		Sanford Stadium; Athens, GA	W 49–0	5,000	
September 29	Clemson*		Sanford Stadium; Athens, GA (rivalry)	W 20–0	10,000	
October 5	at Miami (FL)*		Burdine Stadium; Miami, FL	W 27–21	24,308	
October 13	at Kentucky		McLean Stadium; Lexington, KY	W 48–6	13,000	
October 20	LSU^{†}	No. 12	Sanford Stadium; Athens, GA	L 0–32	25,000	
October 27	at No. 6 Alabama		Legion Field; Birmingham, AL (rivalry)	L 14–28	26,000	
November 3	at Chattanooga*		Chamberlain Field; Chattanooga, TN	W 34–7	7,500	
November 10	vs. Florida		Fairfield Stadium; Jacksonville, FL (rivalry)	W 34–0	21,000	
November 17	vs. Auburn		Memorial Stadium; Columbus, GA (rivalry)	W 35–0	20,000	
December 1	at Georgia Tech	No. 18	Grant Field; Atlanta, GA (rivalry)	W 33–0	30,000	
January 1, 1946	vs. No. 17 Tulsa*	No. 18	Rice Field; Houston, TX (Oil Bowl)	W 20–6	27,000	
*Non-conference game; ^{†}Homecoming; Rankings from AP Poll released prior to the game

== Rankings ==
Ranking movements Legend: ██ Increase in ranking ██ Decrease in ranking — = Not ranked
	Week								
Poll	1	2	3	4	5	6	7	8	Final
AP	—	12	—	—	—	—	—	—	18
