= 1945 Auburn Tigers football team =

American college football season

1945 Auburn Tigers football
- Conference: Southeastern Conference
- Record: 5–5 (2–3 SEC)
- Head coach: Carl M. Voyles (2nd season)
- Home stadium: Auburn Stadium; Legion Field; Cramton Bowl

1945 Southeastern Conference football standings
	Conf.					Overall
Team	W		L		T	W		L		T
No. 2 Alabama $	6	–	0	–	0	10	–	0	–	0
No. 14 Tennessee	3	–	1	–	0	8	–	1	–	0
No. 15 LSU	5	–	2	–	0	7	–	2	–	0
No. 18 Georgia	4	–	2	–	0	9	–	2	–	0
Ole Miss	3	–	3	–	0	4	–	5	–	0
Georgia Tech	2	–	2	–	0	4	–	6	–	0
Mississippi State	2	–	3	–	0	6	–	3	–	0
Auburn	2	–	3	–	0	5	–	5	–	0
Vanderbilt	2	–	4	–	0	3	–	6	–	0
Florida	1	–	3	–	1	4	–	5	–	1
Tulane	1	–	3	–	1	2	–	6	–	1
Kentucky	0	–	5	–	0	2	–	8	–	0
$ – Conference champion; Rankings from AP Poll

The 1945 Auburn Tigers football team represented Auburn University in the 1945 college football season. It was the Tigers' 54th overall and 13th season as a member of the Southeastern Conference (SEC). The team was led by head coach Carl M. Voyles, in his second year, and played their home games at Auburn Stadium in Auburn, the Cramton Bowl in Montgomery and Legion Field in Birmingham, Alabama. They finished the season with a record of five wins and five losses (5–5 overall, 2–3 in the SEC).

== Schedule ==
Date	Time	Opponent	Site	Result	Attendance	Source
September 21		Howard (AL)*	Cramton Bowl; Montgomery, AL	W 38–0	14,000	
September 28	8:00 p.m.	vs. Eastern Flying Training Command*	Cramton Bowl; Montgomery, AL	L 0–7	12,000	
October 6		Mississippi State	Legion Field; Birmingham, AL	L 0–20	18,000	
October 20		at Tulane	Tulane Stadium; New Orleans, LA (rivalry)	W 20–14	28,000	
October 27		at Georgia Tech	Grant Field; Atlanta, GA (rivalry)	L 7–20	30,000	
November 3		Florida^{†}	Auburn Stadium; Auburn, AL (rivalry)	W 19–0	10,000	
November 10		Southwestern Louisiana*	Cramton Bowl; Montgomery, AL	W 52–0	3,500	
November 17		vs. Georgia	Memorial Stadium; Columbus, GA (rivalry)	L 0–35	20,000	
November 24		Louisiana Tech*	Auburn Stadium; Auburn, AL	W 29–0	3,000	
November 30		at Miami (FL)*	Burdine Stadium; Miami, FL	L 7–33	21,601	
*Non-conference game; ^{†}Homecoming; All times are in Central time
