= 1945 Chattanooga Moccasins football team =

American college football season

1945 Chattanooga Moccasins football
- Conference: Independent
- Record: 5–3
- Head coach: Scrappy Moore (15th season)
- Captain: John Karwoski
- Home stadium: Chamberlain Field

1945 Southern college football independents records
	Conf.			Overall
Team	W	L	T	W		L		T
Miami (FL)		–		9	–	1	–	1
No. 3 Navy		–		7	–	1	–	1
Louisiana Normal (Grambling)		–		9	–	2	–	0
Virginia		–		7	–	2	–	0
Chattanooga		–		5	–	3	–	0
Jacksonville State		–		1	–	1	–	0
West Virginia		–		2	–	6	–	1
Tennessee Tech		–		1	–	8	–	0
Howard (AL)		–		0	–	5	–	0
Rankings from AP Poll

The 1945 Chattanooga Moccasins football team was an American football team that represented the University of Chattanooga (now known as the University of Tennessee at Chattanooga) as an independent during the 1945 college football season. In its 15th year under head coach Scrappy Moore, the team compiled a 5–3 record.

== Schedule ==
Date	Opponent	Site	Result	Attendance	Source
September 28	Miami (FL)	Chamberlain Field; Chattanooga, TN	L 7–27		
October 5	Tennessee Tech	Chamberlain Field; Chattanooga, TN	W 20–7		
October 13	at No. 18 Tennessee	Shields–Watkins Field; Knoxville, TN	L 0–30		
October 19	Howard (AL)	Chamberlain Field; Chattanooga, TN	W 47–7		
November 3	Georgia	Chamberlain Field; Chattanooga, TN	L 7–34	7,500	
November 10	at Vanderbilt	Dudley Field; Nashville, TN	W 13–6	500	
November 17	Murray State	Chamberlain Field; Chattanooga, TN	W 28–12	5,000	
November 29	Ole Miss	Chamberlain Field; Chattanooga, TN	W 31–6	7,000	
Rankings from AP Poll released prior to the game
