= 1945 Vanderbilt Commodores football team =

American college football season

1945 Vanderbilt Commodores football
- Conference: Southeastern Conference
- Record: 3–6 (2–4 SEC)
- Head coach: Doby Bartling (2nd season)
- Captains: Dick Bostick; James Hamilton
- Home stadium: Dudley Field

1945 Southeastern Conference football standings
	Conf.					Overall
Team	W		L		T	W		L		T
No. 2 Alabama $	6	–	0	–	0	10	–	0	–	0
No. 14 Tennessee	3	–	1	–	0	8	–	1	–	0
No. 15 LSU	5	–	2	–	0	7	–	2	–	0
No. 18 Georgia	4	–	2	–	0	9	–	2	–	0
Ole Miss	3	–	3	–	0	4	–	5	–	0
Georgia Tech	2	–	2	–	0	4	–	6	–	0
Mississippi State	2	–	3	–	0	6	–	3	–	0
Auburn	2	–	3	–	0	5	–	5	–	0
Vanderbilt	2	–	4	–	0	3	–	6	–	0
Florida	1	–	3	–	1	4	–	5	–	1
Tulane	1	–	3	–	1	2	–	6	–	1
Kentucky	0	–	5	–	0	2	–	8	–	0
$ – Conference champion; Rankings from AP Poll

The 1945 Vanderbilt Commodores football team was an American football team that represented Vanderbilt University as a member of the Southeastern Conference (SEC) during the 1945 college football season. In their second year under head coach Doby Bartling, the Commodores compiled an overall record of 3–6, with a conference record of 2–4, and finished ninth in the SEC.

== Schedule ==
Date	Opponent	Site	Result	Attendance	Source
September 29	Tennessee Tech*	Dudley Field; Nashville, TN	W 12–0	7,000	
October 6	Ole Miss	Dudley Field; Nashville, TN (rivalry)	L 7–14	8,000	
October 13	at Florida	Florida Field; Gainesville, FL	W 7–0	17,000	
October 20	Kentucky	Dudley Field; Nashville, TN (rivalry)	W 19–6	10,000	
October 27	at No. 13 LSU	Tiger Stadium; Baton Rouge, LA	L 7–39	22,000	
November 3	VMI*^{†}	Dudley Field; Nashville, TN	L 13–27	5,000	
November 10	Chattanooga*	Dudley Field; Nashville, TN	L 6–13	500	
November 17	No. 3 Alabama	Dudley Field; Nashville, TN	L 0–71	10,000	
December 1	at No. 17 Tennessee	Shields–Watkins Field; Knoxville, TN (rivalry)	L 0–45	15,000	
*Non-conference game; ^{†}Homecoming; Rankings from AP Poll released prior to the game
