= George Hope (American football) =

American football coach

Biographical details
- Born: Virginia Beach, Virginia, U.S.
- Education: University of Richmond

Coaching career (HC unless noted)
- 1945: Richmond

Head coaching record
- Overall: 2–6

George Hope was the 24th head football coach for the University of Richmond Spiders located in Richmond, Virginia and he held that position for the 1945 season. His career coaching record at Richmond was 2–6, and his greatest game was a 40–0 victory over Guilford College on October 20, 1945.

== Head coaching record ==
| Year | Team | Overall | Conference | Standing | Bowl/playoffs |
|---|---|---|---|---|---|
Richmond Spiders (Southern Conference) (1945)
| 1945 | Richmond | 2–6 | 0–4 | 11th | |
| Richmond: | | 2–6 | 0–4 | | |
| Total: | | 2–6 | | | |
