= 1946 Gator Bowl =

American college football game

- The First Gator Bowl
Wake Forest Demon Deacons	South Carolina Gamecocks
(4–3–1)	(2–3–3)
SoCon	SoCon
26	14
Head coach: Peahead Walker	Head coach: John D. McMillan
AP 19	AP NR
	1	2	3	4	Total
Wake Forest	6	0	6	14	26
South Carolina	0	7	0	7	14
- Date: January 1, 1946
- Season: 1945
- Stadium: Fairfield Stadium
- Location: Jacksonville, Florida
- MVP: Back Nick Sacrinty (Wake Forest)
- Referee: Gerry Gerard (Southern)
- Attendance: 7,362

The 1946 Gator Bowl was the inaugural edition of the annual Gator Bowl, and it featured the Wake Forest Demon Deacons and the South Carolina Gamecocks, both from the Southern Conference. It was a rematch of the teams' regular-season matchup that had ended in a tie.

== Background ==
This was the first bowl game for both team. The two had played earlier in the season (November 22) in Charlotte, ending in a tie, 13–13. Wake Forest had finished 4-3-1 after an 0-3 start, while South Carolina was invited to play despite a losing record of 2–3–3.

== Game summary ==
Nick Sacrinty scored for Wake Forest on a touchdown run to give them a 6–0 lead in the first quarter. South Carolina responded with a Bobby Giles touchdown run for a 7–6 halftime lead. However, Wake Forest would score three straight running touchdowns after halftime, with two Dick Brinkley touchdowns and a Bob Smathers touchdown to gain a 26–7 lead. South Carolina would have a touchdown late on an interception return, but Wake Forest held on to win, with 378 of their 396 total yards coming via rushing.

== Aftermath ==
Wake Forest did not play in another Gator Bowl until their win against Rutgers in the 2021 game, and would have to wait until the 1992 Independence Bowl for their next bowl win. South Carolina would not win a bowl game until the 1995 Carquest Bowl (January), on their ninth bowl appearance.

== Statistics ==
Statistics	Wake Forest	South Carolina
First downs	24	7
Yards rushing	378	88
Yards passing	18	69
Total yards	396	157
Fumbles-Lost	3-1	3-1
Interceptions	2	1
Penalties-Yards	8-70	1-5

== See also ==
- List of college football post-season games that were rematches of regular season games
