= 1945 Tulane Green Wave football team =

American college football season

1945 Tulane Green Wave football
- Conference: Southeastern Conference
- Record: 2–6–1 (1–3–1 SEC)
- Head coach: Claude Simons Jr. (4th season)
- Captain: Game captains
- Home stadium: Tulane Stadium

1945 Southeastern Conference football standings
	Conf.					Overall
Team	W		L		T	W		L		T
No. 2 Alabama $	6	–	0	–	0	10	–	0	–	0
No. 14 Tennessee	3	–	1	–	0	8	–	1	–	0
No. 15 LSU	5	–	2	–	0	7	–	2	–	0
No. 18 Georgia	4	–	2	–	0	9	–	2	–	0
Ole Miss	3	–	3	–	0	4	–	5	–	0
Georgia Tech	2	–	2	–	0	4	–	6	–	0
Mississippi State	2	–	3	–	0	6	–	3	–	0
Auburn	2	–	3	–	0	5	–	5	–	0
Vanderbilt	2	–	4	–	0	3	–	6	–	0
Florida	1	–	3	–	1	4	–	5	–	1
Tulane	1	–	3	–	1	2	–	6	–	1
Kentucky	0	–	5	–	0	2	–	8	–	0
$ – Conference champion; Rankings from AP Poll

The 1945 Tulane Green Wave football team was an American football that represented Tulane University as a member of the Southeastern Conference (SEC) during the 1945 college football season. In its fourth and final year under Claude Simons Jr., Tulane compiled a 2–6–1 record (1–3–1 in conference game), tied for tenth place in the SEC, and was outscored by a total of 212 to 93.

The Green Wave played its home games at Tulane Stadium in New Orleans.

== Schedule ==
Date	Opponent	Site	Result	Attendance	Source
September 29	at Gulfport AAF	Gulfport, MS	W 14–0 (scrimmage)	4,000	
October 6	Florida	Tulane Stadium; New Orleans, LA	T 6–6	20,000	
October 13	at Rice*	Rice Field; Houston, TX	L 7–13	14,000	
October 20	Auburn	Tulane Stadium; New Orleans, LA (rivalry)	L 14–20	28,000	
October 27	SMU*	Tulane Stadium; New Orleans, LA	W 19–7	28,000	
November 3	No. 15 Mississippi State	Tulane Stadium; New Orleans, LA	W 14–13	25,000	
November 10	Georgia Tech	Tulane Stadium; New Orleans, LA	L 7–41	30,000	
November 17	Clemson*	Tulane Stadium; New Orleans, LA	L 20–47	18,000	
November 24	No. 5 Notre Dame*	Tulane Stadium; New Orleans, LA	L 6–32	63,000	
December 1	LSU	Tulane Stadium; New Orleans, LA (Battle for the Rag)	L 0–33	52,644	
*Non-conference game; Rankings from AP Poll released prior to the game
