= John D. McMillan =

American football, basketball, and baseball coach

Biographical details
- Born: January 27, 1919; Fitzgerald, Georgia, U.S.
- Died: November 20, 1981 (aged 62); Charlotte, North Carolina, U.S.
- Education: South Carolina (1941)

Coaching career (HC unless noted)

Football
- 1942–1943: Sumter HS (SC)
- 1944: South Carolina (backfield)
- 1945: South Carolina
- 1946: South Georgia
- 1947–1951: Erskine
- 1952: The Citadel (OL)
- 1953–1954: The Citadel

Basketball
- 1944–1945: South Carolina
- 1947–1949: Erskine
- 1950–1951: Erskine

Baseball
- 1945: South Carolina
- 1948–1951: Erskine
- 1952–1953: The Citadel

Administrative career (AD unless noted)
- 1942–1943: Sumter HS (SC)
- 1946: South Georgia
- 1949–1951: Erskine
- 1953–1954: The Citadel

Head coaching record
- Overall: 25–47–5 (college football)

John Dickson McMillan (January 27, 1919 – November 20, 1981) was an American football, basketball, and baseball coach. He served as the head football coach at the University of South Carolina in 1945, Erskine College from 1947 to 1951, and The Citadel from 1953 to 1954. McMillan was also the head basketball coach at South Carolina during the 1944–45 season, winning the SoCon title, and the head baseball coach at the school in the spring of 1945. In the fall of 1945, he led the South Carolina Gamecocks football team to an invitation to the first Gator Bowl, where they lost, 26–14, to Wake Forest. McMillan also coached basketball and baseball at Erskine and led the basketball team to the 1949 NAIA basketball tournament.

McMillan was born in Fitzgerald, Georgia and graduated from the University of South Carolina in 1941. He died on November 20, 1981.

== Head coaching record ==
=== College football ===
Year	Team	Overall	Conference	Standing	Bowl/playoffs
South Carolina Gamecocks (Southern Conference) (1945)
1945	South Carolina	2–4–3	0–3–2	10th	L Gator
South Carolina:		2–4–3	0–3–2		
Erskine Flying Fleet (South Carolina Little Four) (1947–1951)
1947	Erskine	7–3	1–2	T–3rd	
1948	Erskine	6–4	0–2	4th	
1949	Erskine	2–7	1–1	2nd	
1950	Erskine	4–6	1–2	3rd	
1951	Erskine	0–8–1	0–2–1	T–3rd	
Erskine:		19–28–1	3–9–1		
The Citadel Bulldogs (Southern Conference) (1953–1954)
1953	The Citadel	2–7	1–3	9th	
1954	The Citadel	2–8	0–4	9th	
The Citadel:		4–15–1	1–7		
Total:		25–47–5			

=== Basketball ===
Record table
Season	Team	Overall	Conference	Standing	Postseason
South Carolina Gamecocks (Southern Conference) (1944–1945)
1944–45	South Carolina	19–3	9–0	1st	
South Carolina:		19–3	9–0		
Erskine Flying Fleet (South Carolina Little Five) (1947–1949)
1947–48	Erskine	12–13	3–5	4th	
1948–49	Erskine	13–6	6–0	1st	NAIB First Round
Erskine Flying Fleet (South Carolina Little Four) (1950–1951)
1950–51	Erskine	9–13	3–3	2nd	
Erskine:		34–32	12–8		
Total:		53–35			
