= Chester C. Dillon =

American sports coach and college athletics administrator

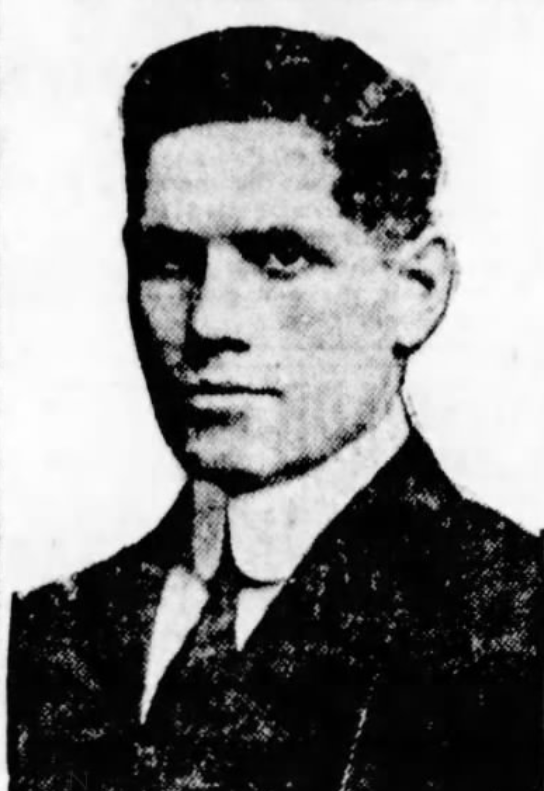
- Dillon pictured in The Birmingham News, 1919

Biographical details
- Born: January 14, 1887; Normal, Illinois, U.S.
- Died: October 22, 1971 (aged 84); Anniston, Alabama, U.S.

Playing career

Football
- 1905–1907: Illinois State Normal
- 1910–1912: Illinois
- Position: Halfback

Coaching career (HC unless noted)

Football
- 1913–1914: Brookings HS (SD)
- 1915: Dakota Wesleyan
- 1916–1917: Simpson (IA)
- 1919: Howard (AL)
- 1920: Oshkosh Normal
- 1921–1924: Coffeyville HS (KS)
- 1925: Howard (AL) (backfield)
- 1926: Howard (AL) (freshmen)
- 1927–1928: Howard (AL)
- 1929–1930: Georgetown (KY)
- 1931–1935: Pontiac HS (IL)
- 1937: Jacksonville State (line)
- 1938–1939: Jacksonville State
- 1945: Jacksonville State

Basketball
- 1913–1915: Brookings HS (SD)
- 1916–1917: Simpson (IA)
- 1918–1920: Howard (AL)
- 1925–1927: Howard (AL)
- 1929–1931: Georgetown (KY)
- 1931–1936: Pontiac HS (IL)

Baseball
- c. 1915: Dakota Wesleyan
- 1920: Howard (AL)
- 1925: Howard (AL)

Track and field
- 1913–1915: Brookings HS (SD)

Administrative career (AD unless noted)
- 1913–1915: Brookings HS (SD)
- 1915–1916: Dakota Wesleyan
- 1916–1918: Simpson (IA)
- 1919–1920: Howard (AL)
- 1920–1921: Oshkosh Normal
- 1921–1924: Coffeyville HS (KS)
- 1925–1929: Howard (AL)
- 1929–1931: Georgetown (KY)
- 1937–1962: Jacksonville State

Head coaching record
- Overall: 40–48–10 (college football)

Accomplishments and honors

Championships
- Football; 1 WNAC (1920)

Chester C. Dillon (January 14, 1887 – October 22, 1971) was an American football player, coach of football, basketball, and baseball, college athletics administrator, and educator. He was the head football coach at Dakota Wesleyan University (1915), Simpson College in Indianola, Iowa (1916–1917), Howard College in Birmingham, Alabama—now known as Samford University (1919, 1927–1928), Oshkosh State Normal School—now known as the University of Wisconsin–Oshkosh (1920), Georgetown College in Georgetown, Kentucky (1929–1930), and Jacksonville State Teachers College—now known as Jacksonville State University (1938–1939, 1945). Dillon also served as the athletic director at each of those schools.

== Early life and playing career ==
Dillon was born on January 14, 1887, in Normal, Illinois. He graduated from high school in Normal in 1905 and then attended Illinois State Normal University—now known as Illinois State University—also located in Normal. He played football at Illinois State Normal from 1905 to 1907 as a halfback and captained the 1907 team. In March 1907, Dillon was hired as a teacher of literature and Latin and track coach at the University of Middle Tennessee, located in Tullahoma, Tennessee. He returned to Illinois State Normal that fall to complete his studies and captain the football team.

Dillon went to the University of Illinois in 1909 and was elected captain of the freshmen football team. He played for three seasons, from 1910 to 1912, for the Illinois varsity football team at halfback before graduating in 1913.

== Coaching career ==
From 1913 to 1915, Dillon was the principal and athletic director at the high school in Brookings, South Dakota. There he also coached football, basketball, and track. In 1915, he was hired at the athletic director at Dakota Wesleyan University in Mitchell, South Dakota. He resigned a year later to take on the same role at Simpson College in Indianola, Iowa.

In 1919, Dillon was hired as athletic director and coach at Howard College—now known as Samford University—in Birmingham, Alabama. A year later, he left Howard to take on the same role at Oshkosh State Normal School—now known as University of Wisconsin–Oshkosh. From 1921 to 1924, Dillon was the athletic director and coach for the city schools in Coffeyville, Kansas. In 1925, he returned to Howard College as athletic director. He served as the backfield coach for 1925 Howard Bulldogs football team, assisting head coach Jenks Gillem. In 1926, Dillon coached the freshmen football team before resuming the role of head coach of the varsity football team in 1927.

Dillon spent two years, from 1929 to 1931, at Georgetown College in Georgetown, Kentucky as athletic director and head coach. In 1931, he returned to him home state to coach football and basketball at Pontiac High School in Pontiac, Illinois. He coached there for five years before resigning in 1936.

Dillon earned a master's degree from the University of Kentucky in 1937. The same year, he was hired at Jacksonville State Teachers College—now known as Jacksonville State University—Jacksonville, Alabama as a physical education instructor and line coach for the football team, assisting head coach T. B. Shotts.

== Death ==
Dillon died on October 22, 1971, at Anniston Memorial Hospital in Anniston, Alabama.

== Head coaching record ==
=== Football ===
Year	Team	Overall	Conference	Standing	Bowl/playoffs
Dakota Wesleyan (Independent) (1915)
1915	Dakota Wesleyan	7–2			
Dakota Wesleyan:		7–2			
Simpson Red and Gold (Independent) (1916–1917)
1916	Simpson	2–3			
1917	Simpson	0–5–1			
Simpson:		2–8–1			
Howard Bulldogs (Southern Intercollegiate Athletic Association) (1919)
1919	Howard	3–5–2	0–4	T–22nd	
Oshkosh Normal Titans (Wisconsin Normal Athletic Conference) (1920)
1920	Oshkosh Normal	6–1–1	4–0–1	1st	
Oshkosh Normal:		6–1–1	4–0–1		
Howard Bulldogs (Southern Intercollegiate Athletic Association) (1927–1928)
1927	Howard	7–2–2	1–2–1	13th	
1928	Howard	6–4–1	4–2–1	9th	
Howard:		16–11–5			
Georgetown Tigers (Kentucky Intercollegiate Athletic Conference) (1929–1930)
1929	Georgetown				
1930	Georgetown				
Georgetown:		7–11			
Jacksonville State Eagle Owls (Southern Intercollegiate Athletic Association) (1938)
1938	Jacksonville State	1–6–1	0–3–1	T–29th	
Jacksonville State Eagle Owls (Alabama Intercollegiate Conference / Southern Intercollegiate Athletic Association) (1938)
1939	Jacksonville State	0–8–2	0–3–1 / 0–3–1	T–5th / T–30th	
Jacksonville State Eagle Owls (Independent) (1945)
1945	Jacksonville State	1–1			
Jacksonville State:		2–15–3	0–8–3		
Total:		40–48–10			
National championship Conference title Conference division title or championship game berth
