= 1945 VMI Keydets football team =

American college football season

1945 VMI Keydets football
- Conference: Southern Conference
- Record: 5–4 (3–2 SoCon)
- Head coach: Pooley Hubert (9th season)
- Home stadium: Alumni Field

1945 Southern Conference football standings
	Conf.					Overall
Team	W		L		T	W		L		T
No. 13 Duke $	4	–	0	–	0	6	–	2	–	0
No. 19 Wake Forest	4	–	1	–	1	5	–	3	–	1
William & Mary	4	–	2	–	0	6	–	3	–	0
Clemson	2	–	1	–	1	6	–	3	–	1
Maryland	3	–	2	–	0	6	–	2	–	1
VMI	3	–	2	–	0	5	–	4	–	0
North Carolina	2	–	2	–	0	5	–	4	–	0
NC State	2	–	4	–	0	3	–	6	–	0
VPI	2	–	5	–	0	2	–	6	–	0
South Carolina	0	–	3	–	2	2	–	4	–	3
Richmond	0	–	4	–	0	2	–	6	–	0
$ – Conference champion; Rankings from AP Poll

The 1945 VMI Keydets football team was an American football team that represented the Virginia Military Institute (VMI) during the 1945 college football season as a member of the Southern Conference. In their ninth year under head coach Pooley Hubert, the team compiled an overall record of 5–4.

== Schedule ==
Date	Opponent	Site	Result	Attendance	Source
September 22	Emory & Henry*	Alumni Field; Lexington, VA	W 37–0	2,500	
September 29	at Richmond	City Stadium; Richmond, VA (rivalry)	W 40–6	10,000	
October 6	vs. Virginia	City Stadium; Lynchburg, VA	L 7–40	8,000	
October 13	at NC State	Riddick Stadium; Raleigh, NC	W 21–14	7,500	
October 20	vs. William & Mary	City Stadium; Richmond, VA (rivalry)	L 9–13	10,000	
November 3	at Vanderbilt*	Dudley Field; Nashville, TN	W 27–13	5,000	
November 10	at Maryland	Byrd Stadium; College Park, MD	L 0–38	7,000	
November 17	Catawba*	Alumni Field; Lexington, VA	L 7–14	1,000	
November 22	vs. VPI	Victory Stadium; Roanoke, VA (rivalry)	W 7–0	23,000	
*Non-conference game
