= 1945 Miami Hurricanes football team =

American college football season

1945 Miami Hurricanes football

Orange Bowl champion

Orange Bowl, W 13–6 vs. Holy Cross
- Conference: Independent
- Record: 9–1–1
- Head coach: Jack Harding (7th season)
- Home stadium: Burdine Stadium

1945 Southern college football independents records
	Conf.			Overall
Team	W	L	T	W		L		T
Miami (FL)		–		9	–	1	–	1
No. 3 Navy		–		7	–	1	–	1
Louisiana Normal (Grambling)		–		9	–	2	–	0
Virginia		–		7	–	2	–	0
Chattanooga		–		5	–	3	–	0
Jacksonville State		–		1	–	1	–	0
West Virginia		–		2	–	6	–	1
Tennessee Tech		–		1	–	8	–	0
Howard (AL)		–		0	–	5	–	0
Rankings from AP Poll

The 1945 Miami Hurricanes football team represented the University of Miami as an independent during the 1945 college football season. The Hurricanes played their home games at Burdine Stadium in Miami, Florida, United States. The team was coached by Jack Harding, in his seventh year as head coach for the Hurricanes. The Hurricanes participated in the Orange Bowl in a post-season matchup against Holy Cross. The Hurricanes won 13 to 6.

== Schedule ==
Date	Opponent	Site	Result	Attendance	Source
September 29	at Chattanooga	Chamberlain Field; Chattanooga, TN	W 27–7		
October 5	Georgia	Burdine Stadium; Miami, FL	L 21–27	24,308	
October 12	Saint Louis	Burdine Stadium; Miami, FL	W 21–0	14,881	
October 19	Florida	Burdine Stadium; Miami, FL (rivalry)	W 7–6	27,000	
October 26	Miami (OH)	Burdine Stadium; Miami, FL	W 27–13	20,564	
November 2	Clemson	Burdine Stadium; Miami, FL	W 7–6	20,982	
November 9	South Carolina	Burdine Stadium; Miami, FL	T 13–13	18,056	
November 16	NC State	Burdine Stadium; Miami, FL	W 21–7	18,864	
November 23	Michigan State	Burdine Stadium; Miami, FL	W 21–7	21,327	
November 30	Auburn	Burdine Stadium; Miami, FL	W 33–7	21,601	
January 1	No. 13 Holy Cross	Burdine Stadium; Miami, FL (Orange Bowl)	W 13–6	38,000	
Rankings from AP Poll released prior to the game
