= 1945 William & Mary Indians football team =

American college football season

1945 William & Mary Indians football
- Conference: Southern Conference
- Record: 6–3 (4–2 SoCon)
- Head coach: Rube McCray (2nd season)
- Captain: Eugene Holloway
- Home stadium: Cary Field

1945 Southern Conference football standings
	Conf.					Overall
Team	W		L		T	W		L		T
No. 13 Duke $	4	–	0	–	0	6	–	2	–	0
No. 19 Wake Forest	4	–	1	–	1	5	–	3	–	1
William & Mary	4	–	2	–	0	6	–	3	–	0
Clemson	2	–	1	–	1	6	–	3	–	1
Maryland	3	–	2	–	0	6	–	2	–	1
VMI	3	–	2	–	0	5	–	4	–	0
North Carolina	2	–	2	–	0	5	–	4	–	0
NC State	2	–	4	–	0	3	–	6	–	0
VPI	2	–	5	–	0	2	–	6	–	0
South Carolina	0	–	3	–	2	2	–	4	–	3
Richmond	0	–	4	–	0	2	–	6	–	0
$ – Conference champion; Rankings from AP Poll

The 1945 William & Mary Indians football team represented the College of William & Mary as a member of the Southern Conference (SoCon) during the 1945 college football season. Led by second-year head coach Rube McCray, the Indians compiled an overall record of 6–3 with a mark of 4–2 in conference play, and finished third in the SoCon. William & Mary played home games at Cary Field in Williamsburg, Virginia.

== Schedule ==
Date	Opponent	Site	Result	Attendance	Source
September 29	Catawba*	Cary Field; Williamsburg, VA	W 19–6		
October 6	at Tennessee*	Shields–Watkins Field; Knoxville, TN	L 13–48	15,000	
October 13	vs. VPI	City Stadium; Richmond, VA	W 38–0	9,000	
October 20	vs. VMI	City Stadium; Richmond, VA (rivalry)	W 13–9	10,000	
October 26	vs. NC State	Foreman Field; Norfolk, VA	L 6–20	15,000	
November 3	at Maryland	Byrd Stadium; College Park, MD	W 33–14	7,500	
November 10	vs. North Carolina	Foreman Field; Norfolk, VA	L 0–6	10,000	
November 17	Merchant Marine*^{†}	Cary Field; Williamsburg, VA	W 25–7	5,000	
November 22	at Richmond	City Stadium; Richmond, VA (rivalry)	W 33–0	7,500	
*Non-conference game; ^{†}Homecoming

== NFL draft selections ==
= Pro Football Hall of Fame	= Canadian Football Hall of Fame	= College Football Hall of Fame

NFL Draft Selections

#	Year	Round	Pick	Overall	Name	Team	Position
10	1946	10	8	88	Al Vandeweghe	Philadelphia Eagles	End
11	1946	11	3	93	Doc Holloway	Pittsburgh Steelers	Guard
12	1946	16	8	148	Buddy Hubbard	Philadelphia Eagles	Back
13	1946	20	8	188	Dave Butcher	Philadelphia Eagles	Back
