= 1945 VPI Gobblers football team =

American college football season

1945 VPI Gobblers football
- Conference: Southern Conference
- Record: 2–6 (2–5 SoCon)
- Head coach: Herbert McEver (2nd season)
- Home stadium: Miles Stadium

1945 Southern Conference football standings
	Conf.					Overall
Team	W		L		T	W		L		T
No. 13 Duke $	4	–	0	–	0	6	–	2	–	0
No. 19 Wake Forest	4	–	1	–	1	5	–	3	–	1
William & Mary	4	–	2	–	0	6	–	3	–	0
Clemson	2	–	1	–	1	6	–	3	–	1
Maryland	3	–	2	–	0	6	–	2	–	1
VMI	3	–	2	–	0	5	–	4	–	0
North Carolina	2	–	2	–	0	5	–	4	–	0
NC State	2	–	4	–	0	3	–	6	–	0
VPI	2	–	5	–	0	2	–	6	–	0
South Carolina	0	–	3	–	2	2	–	4	–	3
Richmond	0	–	4	–	0	2	–	6	–	0
$ – Conference champion; Rankings from AP Poll

The 1945 VPI Gobblers football team represented Virginia Polytechnic Institute in the 1945 college football season. The team was led by their head coach Herbert McEver and finished with a record of two wins and six losses (2–6). This was VPI's first season since 1942 after the suspension of the football program at the institute during the 1943 and 1944 seasons due to the Second World War.

== Schedule ==
Date	Time	Opponent	Site	Result	Attendance	Source
October 6	2:30 p.m.	vs. North Carolina	Victory Stadium; Roanoke, VA	L 0–14	6,000	
October 13		vs. William & Mary	City Stadium; Richmond, VA	L 0–38	9,000	
October 20		Maryland	Miles Stadium; Blacksburg, VA	W 21–13	6,500	
October 27		vs. Virginia*	Victory Stadium; Roanoke, VA (rivalry)	L 13–31	12,000	
November 3		at NC State	Riddick Stadium; Raleigh, NC	L 0–6	9,000	
November 10		at Clemson	Memorial Stadium; Clemson, SC	L 0–35	7,000	
November 17		Richmond	Miles Stadium; Blacksburg, VA	W 44–6		
November 22		vs. VMI	Victory Stadium; Roanoke, VA (rivalry)	L 0–7	23,000	
*Non-conference game

== Roster ==
The following players were members of the 1945 football team.

VPI 1945 roster
Frank H. Ballard; Clinton Barns; Joseph Beard; Ralph Coe Beard; Ernest Booher; Floyd Samuel Bowles; Leigh Carter Budwell; Thomas Craig Burns; Harry Bushkar; John Bushkar; Billy Patrick DeNardo; Charles Mugler Forbes; Howard G. Forrest	Elder Grifton Glenn Jr; Thomas Gregory; John L. Hamilton; William H. Hegamyer; Robert Hess; Newman Hoffman; William Hubble; Cary Kenyon Johnson; J. R. Kautz; William Kinsey; Albert Klele; Timothy Lawler; Stanley Majcher	Robert McLear; Ross Moore Orr; Clifford Peacock; Joseph Peery; Jay B. Ratliff; Charles Rolfe; E. Gerald Staley; James Tilson; Bobby Joe Wellman; Edwin Williams; Forrest Bayard "Frank" Yarborough; Gerhard Charles Zekert
