= 1945 Tennessee Volunteers football team =

American college football season

1945 Tennessee Volunteers football
- Conference: Southeastern Conference

Ranking
- AP: No. 14
- Record: 8–1 (3–1 SEC)
- Head coach: John Barnhill (4th season)
- Home stadium: Shields–Watkins Field

1945 Southeastern Conference football standings
	Conf.					Overall
Team	W		L		T	W		L		T
No. 2 Alabama $	6	–	0	–	0	10	–	0	–	0
No. 14 Tennessee	3	–	1	–	0	8	–	1	–	0
No. 15 LSU	5	–	2	–	0	7	–	2	–	0
No. 18 Georgia	4	–	2	–	0	9	–	2	–	0
Ole Miss	3	–	3	–	0	4	–	5	–	0
Georgia Tech	2	–	2	–	0	4	–	6	–	0
Mississippi State	2	–	3	–	0	6	–	3	–	0
Auburn	2	–	3	–	0	5	–	5	–	0
Vanderbilt	2	–	4	–	0	3	–	6	–	0
Florida	1	–	3	–	1	4	–	5	–	1
Tulane	1	–	3	–	1	2	–	6	–	1
Kentucky	0	–	5	–	0	2	–	8	–	0
$ – Conference champion; Rankings from AP Poll

The 1945 Tennessee Volunteers (variously Tennessee, UT, or the Vols) represented the University of Tennessee in the 1945 college football season. Playing as a member of the Southeastern Conference (SEC), the team was led by head coach John Barnhill, in his fourth year, and played their home games at Shields–Watkins Field in Knoxville, Tennessee. They finished the season with a record of eight wins and one loss (8–1 overall, 3–1 in the SEC).

== Schedule ==
Date	Opponent	Rank	Site	Result	Attendance	Source
September 29	Wake Forest*		Shields–Watkins Field; Knoxville, TN	W 7–6	15,000	
October 6	William & Mary*		Shields–Watkins Field; Knoxville, TN	W 48–13	15,000	
October 13	Chattanooga*	No. 18	Shields–Watkins Field; Knoxville, TN	W 30–0		
October 20	at No. 6 Alabama		Legion Field; Birmingham, AL (Third Saturday in October)	L 7–25	28,000	
October 27	Villanova*		Shields–Watkins Field; Knoxville, TN	W 33–2	15,000	
November 3	North Carolina*		Shields–Watkins Field; Knoxville, TN	W 20–6	18,000	
November 10	vs. Ole Miss		Crump Stadium; Memphis, TN (rivalry)	W 34–0	6,000	
November 24	at Kentucky	No. 14	McLean Stadium; Lexington, KY (rivalry)	W 14–0	12,000	
December 1	Vanderbilt^{†}	No. 17	Shields–Watkins Field; Knoxville, TN (rivalry)	W 45–0	15,000	
*Non-conference game; ^{†}Homecoming; Rankings from AP Poll released prior to the game

== Rankings ==
Ranking movements Legend: ██ Increase in ranking ██ Decrease in ranking — = Not ranked
	Week								
Poll	1	2	3	4	5	6	7	8	Final
AP	18	—	—	—	—	18	14	17	14

== Team players drafted into the NFL ==
Player	Position	Round	Pick	NFL club
Walter Slater	Back	3	37	Philadelphia Eagles
Jim Vugrin	Guard	26	241	Chicago Cardinals
Bob Long	Back	26	268	Philadelphia Eagles
