= 1946 Rose Bowl =

American college football game

- 32nd Rose Bowl Game
USC Trojans	Alabama Crimson Tide
(7–3)	(9–0)
PCC	SEC
14	34
Head coach: Jeff Cravath	Head coach: Frank Thomas
AP 11	AP 3
	1	2	3	4	Total
USC	0	0	0	14	14
Alabama	7	13	7	7	34
- Date: January 1, 1946
- Season: 1945
- Stadium: Rose Bowl
- Location: Pasadena, California
- MVP: Harry Gilmer (Alabama HB)
- Favorite: Alabama by 13 points
- Referee: Orian Landreth (Pacific Coast; split crew: Pacific Coast, SEC)
- Attendance: 93,000

The 1946 Rose Bowl was the 32nd edition of the college football bowl game, played at the Rose Bowl in Pasadena, California, on Tuesday, January 1.

The game matched the undefeated Crimson Tide of the University of Alabama of the Southeastern Conference (SEC) and the #7 Trojans of the University of Southern California of the Pacific Coast Conference (PCC). The Tide defeated the underdog Trojans 34–14. It was Alabama's sixth appearance in the Rose Bowl.

== Game summary ==
Alabama led at the half 20–0 and the Trojans had a net loss of 24 yards. USC, which had won eight straight Rose Bowl games since 1923, didn't make a first down until the third quarter when the score was 27–0.

Alabama outgained USC 351 to 41 yards. Quarterback Harry Gilmer threw only eleven times in the game for one touchdown and ran for 116 yards on 16 carries. Hal Self scored twice, on a one-yard run and on a 24-yard Gilmer pass. Gilmer went over from the one, and Lowell Tew hit left guard from the two for points and Norwood Hodges scored up the middle on a one-yard plunge. Hugh Morrow kicked four extra points in the game.

== Scoring ==
=== First quarter ===
- Ala – Hal Self, 1-yard run (Hugh Morrow kick good)

=== Second quarter ===
- Ala – Self, 1-yard run (Morrow kick good)
- Ala – Lowell Tew, 5-yard run (Morrow kick missed)

=== Third quarter ===
- Ala – Norwood Hodges, 1-yard run (Morrow kick good)

=== Fourth quarter ===
- Ala – Harry Gilmer, 20-yard pass from Self (Morrow kick good)
- USC – Harry Adelman, 26-yard pass from Verl Lillywhite (Joe Bowman kick good)
- USC – Chick Clark returned a blocked kick (Lillywhite kick good)

== Aftermath ==
Following this game, the PCC and Big Nine (now Pac-12 and Big Ten) entered into an exclusive five-year agreement for their champions to meet in the Rose Bowl. It has been extended numerous times, and outside of rotations in the playoffs, and until the conference realignment led to the demise of the "old" Pac-12. Both conferences openly admitted restricting the Rose Bowl, because they were tired of getting beaten by teams playing "hillbilly ball," the same reason they cited for not inviting them before 1920.

This was the last Rose Bowl appearance by an SEC team for 72 years, when Georgia defeated Oklahoma in a national semifinal in early 2018. The first break in the Pac-12/Big Ten arrangement came in 2002, when it was the BCS Championship Game between Nebraska and Miami; at the time members of the Big XII and Big East respectively.

== Statistics ==
Statistics	USC	Alabama
First downs	3	18
Rushing yards	6	292
Passing yards	35	59

== See also ==
- Dissatisfaction with distribution of tickets
