= 1945 Maryland Terrapins football team =

American college football season

1945 Maryland Terrapins football
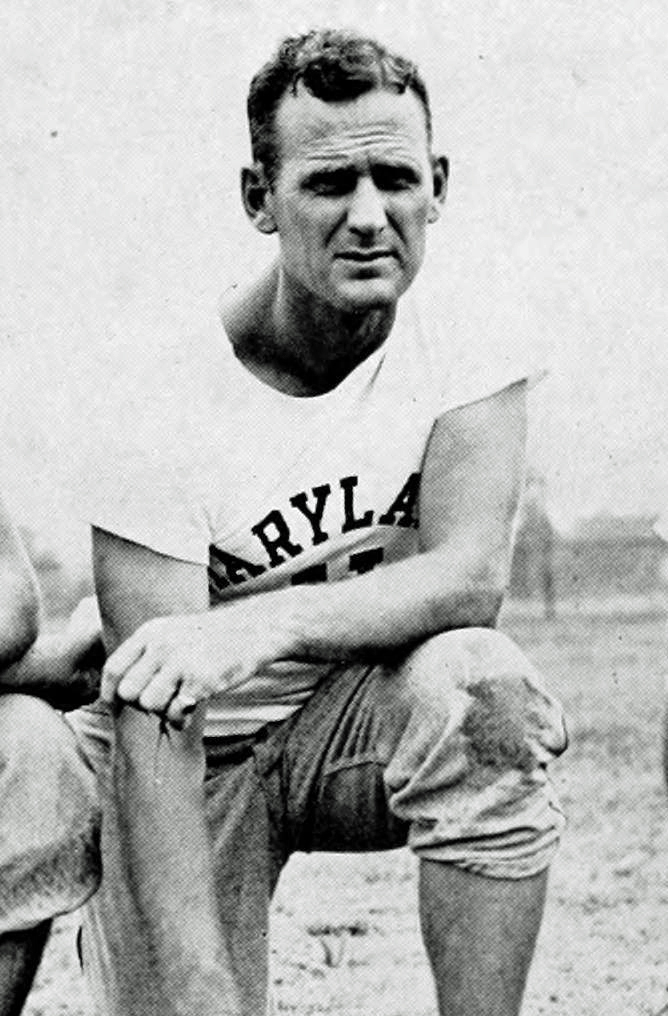
- Bear Bryant as Maryland head coach in 1945
- Conference: Southern Conference
- Record: 6–2–1 (3–2 SoCon)
- Head coach: Bear Bryant (1st season)
- Home stadium: Byrd Stadium (original)

1945 Southern Conference football standings
	Conf.					Overall
Team	W		L		T	W		L		T
No. 13 Duke $	4	–	0	–	0	6	–	2	–	0
No. 19 Wake Forest	4	–	1	–	1	5	–	3	–	1
William & Mary	4	–	2	–	0	6	–	3	–	0
Clemson	2	–	1	–	1	6	–	3	–	1
Maryland	3	–	2	–	0	6	–	2	–	1
VMI	3	–	2	–	0	5	–	4	–	0
North Carolina	2	–	2	–	0	5	–	4	–	0
NC State	2	–	4	–	0	3	–	6	–	0
VPI	2	–	5	–	0	2	–	6	–	0
South Carolina	0	–	3	–	2	2	–	4	–	3
Richmond	0	–	4	–	0	2	–	6	–	0
$ – Conference champion; Rankings from AP Poll

The 1945 Maryland Terrapins football team was an American football team that represented the University of Maryland as a member of the Southern Conference during the 1945 college football season. In its first and only season under head coach Bear Bryant, the team compiled a 6–2–1 record (2–2 in conference), tied for fifth place in the conference, and outscored opponents by a total of 219 to 105.

Bryant, then 31 years old, was hired as Maryland's head coach in early September, approximately three weeks before the season began. Bryant had served in the Navy for the prior three years. He had been an assistant coach of the 1944 North Carolina Pre-Flight Cloudbusters football team and was scheduled to be the team's head coach in 1945. However, the Navy announced in late August that the Navy's Pre-Flight schools would not field football teams in 1945. Bryant brought 20 number of players from the disbanded North Carolina Pre-Flight with him to Maryland.

No Maryland player were named to the 1945 All-Southern Conference football team selected by coaches and sports writers for the Associated Press.

In January 1946, after only four months at Maryland, Bryant resigned his position to become head coach at Kentucky. According to one report, Bryant did not get along with university president Curley Byrd. In one incident, Byrd reinstated a player who Bryant had suspended for a violation of team rules.

== Schedule ==
Date	Opponent	Site	Result	Attendance	Source
September 28	Guilford*	Byrd Stadium; College Park, MD	W 60–6	6,000	
October 6	at Richmond	City Stadium; Richmond, VA	W 21–0	< 2,000	
October 12	Merchant Marine*	Byrd Stadium; College Park, MD	W 22–6	8,000	
October 20	at VPI	Miles Stadium; Blacksburg, VA	L 13–21	6,500	
October 27	at West Virginia*	Mountaineer Field; Morgantown, WV (rivalry)	T 13–13	12,000	
November 3	William & Mary	Byrd Stadium; College Park, MD	L 14–33	7,500	
November 10	VMI^{†}	Byrd Stadium; College Park, MD	W 38–0	7,000	
November 24	vs. No. 13 Virginia*	Griffith Stadium; Washington, DC (rivalry)	W 19–13	15,000	
December 1	at South Carolina	Carolina Stadium; Columbia, SC	W 19–13	8,000	
*Non-conference game; ^{†}Homecoming; Rankings from AP Poll released prior to the game
