= Crockett, Virginia =

- Unincorporated community
- Location within Virginia Location within the United States
- Coordinates: 36°53′10″N 81°11′31″W
- Country: United States
- State: Virginia
- County: Wythe
- Elevation: 2,349 ft (716 m)
- Time zone: UTC-5 (Eastern (EST))
  - Summer (DST): UTC-4 (EDT)
- ZIP code: 24323
- GNIS feature ID: 1482840

Crockett is an unincorporated community in Wythe County, Virginia, United States. Its name honors Walter Crockett (c. 1732-1816), a Revolutionary War veteran and politician who represented Montgomery County in the Virginia House of Delegates and helped to form Wythe County. On September 18, 1992, Crockett postmistress Donna Jean Stevenson was murdered in the Crockett community post office.
