= 1946 Orange Bowl =

American college football game

- 12th Orange Bowl
- Burdine Stadium in Miami, Florida, hosted the Orange Bowl.
Holy Cross Crusaders	Miami Hurricanes
(8–1)	(8–1–1)
Independent	Independent
6	13
Head coach: Ox DaGrosa	Head coach: Jack Harding
AP 16
	1	2	3	4	Total
Holy Cross	6	0	0	0	6
Miami	0	6	0	7	13
- Date: January 1, 1946
- Season: 1945
- Stadium: Burdine Stadium
- Location: Miami, Florida
- Referee: Alvin Bell (SEC; (split crew: SEC, ECAC)
- Attendance: 35,709

The 1946 Orange Bowl was a college football postseason bowl game between the Miami Hurricanes and the Holy Cross Crusaders

== Background ==
Holy Cross was led by rookie head coach John "Ox" DaGrosa. Jack Harding had returned to the Hurricanes after serving in the war, in Miami's first bowl game since 1935. This was their third 8-win season under Harding, the first two in 1938 and 1941.

== Game summary ==
Joe Krull gave Miami the lead on his 1-yard run for a touchdown, but the kick failed, leaving it at 6–0. Holy Cross' Walter Brennan caught a touchdown pass from Koslowski to counter, but the kick failed, leaving it tied at 6. The Crusaders were driving towards the end zone, tied at 6–6. With less than 15 seconds remaining, Holy Cross was at the Miami 26. Unwilling to settle for the tie, DaGrosa sent in Gene DeFilippo to go for the win. DeFilippo threw a pass for receiver Bob Conway, but the ball fell off his fingertips at the 11-yard line, and Al Hudson retrieved the ball and dashed 89 yards for the touchdown as time expired.

== Aftermath ==
The Crusaders went 9–8 before DaGrosa left the program in 1947. He died in 1953, after a short illness. This remains the only bowl appearance for Holy Cross. Miami returned to the Orange Bowl five years later in 1951. Conway returned to Holy Cross for a 50th Orange Bowl reunion, where he met up with Hudson once again. The two became friends, and they and their families have dinner when they vacation in Florida.

== Statistics ==
Statistics	Miami	Holy Cross
First downs	7	13
Rushing yards	193	181
Passing yards	0	59
Total yards	193	240
Interceptions	3	4
Punts/Avg.	10–36.4	9–38.5
Fumbles/Lost	0–0	1–1
Penalties/Yards	7–41	1–5
