= 1945 NC State Wolfpack football team =

American college football season

1945 NC State Wolfpack football
- Conference: Southern Conference
- Record: 3–6 (2–4 SoCon)
- Head coach: Beattie Feathers (2nd season)
- Home stadium: Riddick Stadium

1945 Southern Conference football standings
	Conf.					Overall
Team	W		L		T	W		L		T
No. 13 Duke $	4	–	0	–	0	6	–	2	–	0
No. 19 Wake Forest	4	–	1	–	1	5	–	3	–	1
William & Mary	4	–	2	–	0	6	–	3	–	0
Clemson	2	–	1	–	1	6	–	3	–	1
Maryland	3	–	2	–	0	6	–	2	–	1
VMI	3	–	2	–	0	5	–	4	–	0
North Carolina	2	–	2	–	0	5	–	4	–	0
NC State	2	–	4	–	0	3	–	6	–	0
VPI	2	–	5	–	0	2	–	6	–	0
South Carolina	0	–	3	–	2	2	–	4	–	3
Richmond	0	–	4	–	0	2	–	6	–	0
$ – Conference champion; Rankings from AP Poll

The 1945 NC State Wolfpack football team was an American football team that represented North Carolina State University as a member of the Southern Conference (SoCon) during the 1945 college football season. In its second season under head coach Beattie Feathers, the team compiled a 3–6 record (2–4 against SoCon opponents) and was outscored by a total of 144 to 131.

== Schedule ==
Date	Opponent	Site	Result	Attendance	Source
September 22	Milligan*	Riddick Stadium; Raleigh, NC	W 47–12	5,000	
September 29	vs. Virginia*	Foreman Field; Norfolk, VA	L 6–26	20,000	
October 6	Clemson	Riddick Stadium; Raleigh, NC (rivalry)	L 0–13	5,000	
October 13	VMI	Riddick Stadium; Raleigh, NC	L 14–21	7,500	
October 20	Wake Forest	Riddick Stadium; Raleigh, NC (rivalry)	L 18–19	17,000	
October 26	vs. William & Mary	Foreman Field; Norfolk, VA	W 20–6	15,000	
November 3	VPI	Riddick Stadium; Raleigh, NC	W 6–0	9,000	
November 10	at No. 16 Duke	Duke Stadium; Durham, NC (rivalry)	L 13–26	15,000	
November 16	at Miami (FL)*	Burdine Stadium; Miami, FL	L 7–21	18,864	
*Non-conference game; Rankings from AP Poll released prior to the game
