= Lowell Tew =

American football player (1927–1981)

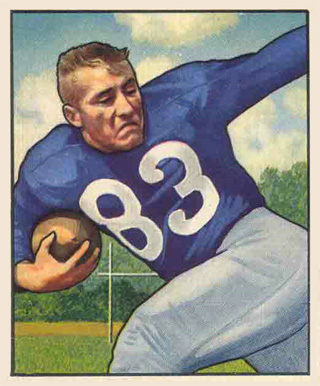
- Tew on a 1950 Bowman football card

No. 83
- Position: Fullback

Personal information
- Born: January 2, 1927; Waynesboro, Mississippi, U.S.
- Died: March 16, 1981 (aged 54); Laurel, Mississippi, U.S.
- Listed height: 5 ft 11 in (1.80 m)
- Listed weight: 195 lb (88 kg)

Career information
- College: Alabama
- NFL draft: 1948: 1st round, 4th overall pick

Career history
- New York Yankees (1948–1949)

Awards and highlights
- First-team All-SEC (1947); Second-team All-SEC (1945)

Career NFL statistics
- Rushing yards: 160
- Rushing average: 4.2
- Receptions: 7
- Receiving yards: 97
- Total touchdowns: 6
- Stats at Pro Football Reference

Lowell William Tew (January 2, 1927 – March 1981) was an American professional football fullback in the All-America Football Conference (AAFC) for the New York Yankees. He played college football at the University of Alabama and was drafted in the first round (fourth overall) of the 1948 NFL draft.
