= 1944 All-Eastern football team =

American all-star college football team

The 1944 All-Eastern football team consists of American football players chosen by various selectors as the best players at each position among the Eastern colleges and universities during the 1944 college football season.

== All-Eastern selections ==
=== Backs ===
- Harold Hamburg, Navy (AP-1 [qb])
- Glenn Davis, Army (AP-1 [hb])
- Bob Jenkins, Navy (AP-1 [hb])
- Doc Blanchard, Army (AP-1 [fb])
- Doug Kenna, Army (AP-2)
- Clyde Scott, Navy (AP-2)
- Skip Minisi, Penn (AP-2)
- Al Dekdebrun, Cornell (AP-2)

=== Ends ===
- Leon Bramlett, Navy (AP-1)
- Barney Poole, Army (AP-1)
- Paul Walker, Yale (AP-2)
- George Gilbert, Columbia (AP-2)

=== Tackles ===
- Don Whitmire, Navy (AP-1)
- George Savitsky, Penn (AP-1)
- George Kochins, Bucknell (AP-2)
- Dan Boon, Coast Guard (AP-2)

=== Guards ===
- John Green, Army (AP-1)
- Tom Smith, Yale (AP-1)
- Ben Chase, Navy (AP-2)
- Joe Stanowicz, Army (AP-2)

=== Centers ===
- Robert St. Onge, Army (AP-1)
- Jack Martin, Navy (AP-2)

== Key ==
- AP = Associated Press

== See also ==
- 1944 College Football All-America Team
