= 1945 All-SEC football team =

American college football all-star team

The 1945 All-SEC football team consists of American football players selected to the All-Southeastern Conference (SEC) chosen by various selectors for the 1945 college football season. Alabama won the conference title.

== All-SEC selections ==
=== Ends ===
- Bill Hildebrand, Miss. St. (AP-1, UP-1)
- Rebel Steiner, Alabama (AP-1, UP-2)
- Reid Moseley, Georgia (AP-2, UP-1)
- Clyde Lindsey, LSU (AP-2, UP-2)
- Buddy Pike, Tennessee (AP-3)
- Walter Kilzer, Georgia Tech (AP-3)

=== Tackles ===
- Bob Davis, Georgia Tech (AP-1, UP-1)
- Tom Whitley, Alabama (AP-1, UP-2)
- Mike Castronis, Georgia (AP-2, UP-1)
- Jack White, Florida (AP-3, UP-2)
- Wash Serini, Kentucky (AP-2)
- Dub Garrett, Miss. St. (AP-3)

=== Guards ===
- Bob Dobelstein, Tennessee (AP-1, UP-1)
- Felix Trapani, LSU (AP-1, UP-1)
- Gaston Bourgeois, Tulane (AP-2, UP-2)
- Herbert St. John, Georgia (AP-3, UP-2)
- Jack Green, Alabama (AP-2)
- George Hills, Georgia Tech (AP-3)

=== Centers ===
- Vaughn Mancha, Alabama (College Football Hall of Fame) (AP-1, UP-1)
- Paul Duke, Georgia Tech (AP-2, UP-2)
- Hugh Bowers, Tulane (AP-3)

=== Quarterbacks ===
- Harry Gilmer, Alabama (College Football Hall of Fame) (AP-1, UP-1)

=== Halfbacks ===
- Charley Trippi, Georgia (College Football Hall of Fame) (AP-1, UP-1)
- Harper Davis, Miss. St. (AP-1, UP-1)
- Buster Stephens, Tennessee (AP-2, UP-2)
- Curtis Kuykendall, Auburn (AP-2, UP-2)
- Bill Fuqua, Vanderbilt (AP-3, UP-2)
- Billy Bevis, Tennessee (AP-3)
- Jim Cason, LSU (AP-3)
- Graham Bramlett, Miss. St. (AP-3)

=== Fullbacks ===
- Gene Knight, LSU (AP-1, UP-1)
- George Mathews, Georgia Tech (AP-2, UP-2)
- Lowell Tew, Alabama (AP-2)

== Key ==
AP = Associated Press

UP = United Press.

Bold = Consensus first-team selection by both AP and UP

== See also ==
- 1945 College Football All-America Team
