= Jim Hardy =

American football player (1923–2019)

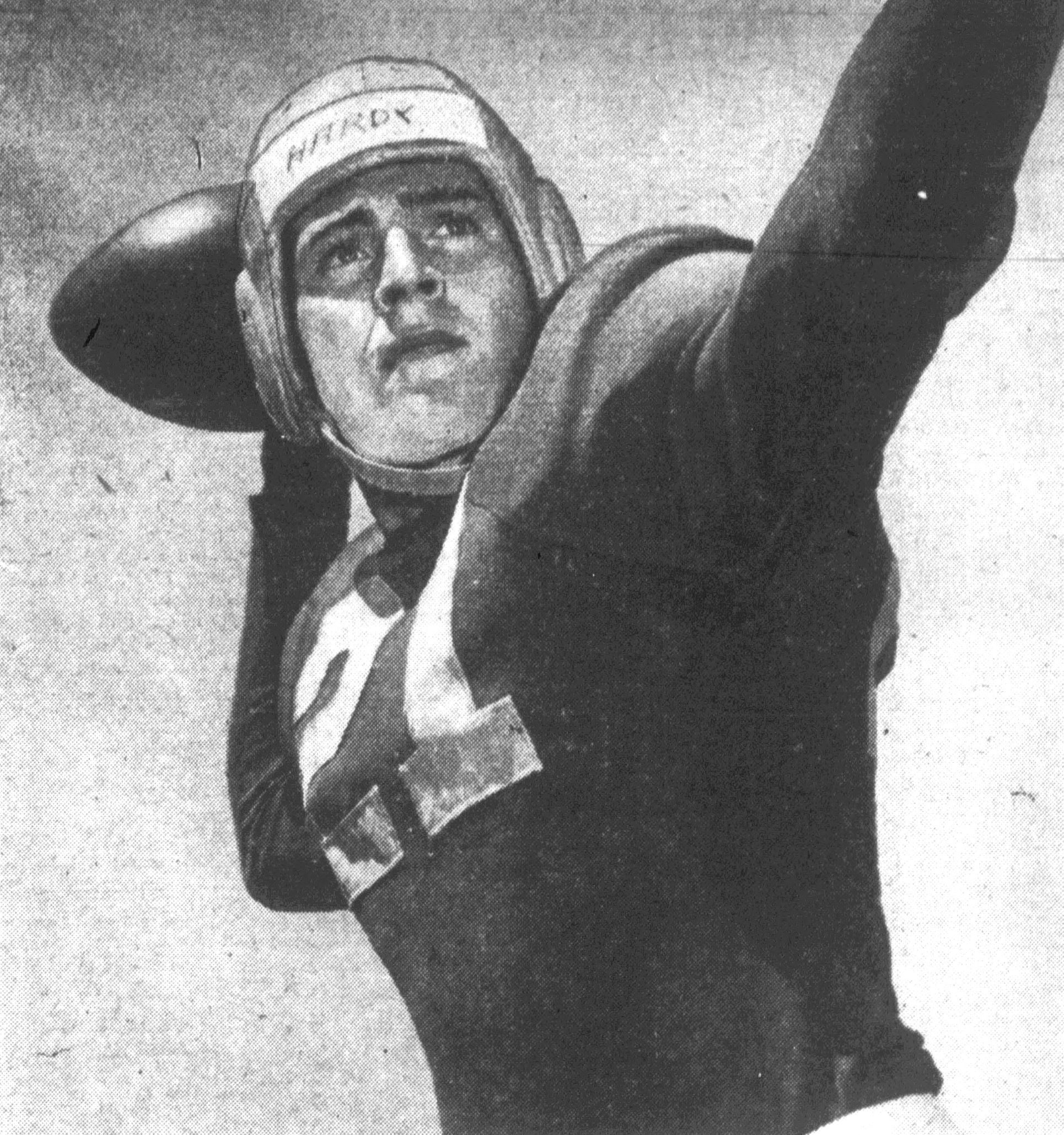
- Hardy circa 1946

No. 21, 22, 1
- Position: Quarterback

Personal information
- Born: April 24, 1923; Los Angeles, California, U.S.
- Died: August 16, 2019 (aged 96); La Quinta, California, U.S.
- Listed height: 6 ft 0 in (1.83 m)
- Listed weight: 180 lb (82 kg)

Career information
- High school: Fairfax (Los Angeles)
- College: USC (1941-1944)
- NFL draft: 1945: 1st round, 8th overall pick

Career history
- Los Angeles Rams (1946–1948); Chicago Cardinals (1949–1951); Detroit Lions (1952)

Awards and highlights
- NFL champion (1952); Pro Bowl (1950); Second-team All-American (1944); First-team All-PCC (1944); NFL record: Most interceptions thrown in an NFL game: 8 (1950)

Career NFL statistics
- Passing attempts: 912
- Passing completions: 423
- Completion percentage: 46.4%
- TD–INT: 54–73
- Passing yards: 5,690
- Passer rating: 53.1
- Stats at Pro Football Reference

James Francis Hardy (April 24, 1923 – August 16, 2019) was an American professional football player who was a quarterback for seven seasons in the National Football League (NFL). He played college football for the USC Trojans and was selected by the Los Angeles Rams in the first round of the 1945 NFL draft.

== Early life ==
Hardy attended and played high school football at Fairfax High School in Los Angeles.

== College career ==
Hardy played college football at the University of Southern California. He was voted most valuable player of the 1945 Rose Bowl game, won by USC 25–0 over Tennessee.

== Professional career ==
Hardy was selected in the first round (eighth overall) of the 1945 NFL draft by the Washington Redskins. He played in the National Football League between 1946 and 1952. He made the Pro Bowl in 1950. Hardy is perhaps most famous for throwing an NFL-record eight interceptions in a single game, as well as for the worst touchdown pass-interception differential in a single game (−8), in a 45–7 loss to the Philadelphia Eagles on September 24, 1950.

He later served as the general manager of the Los Angeles Memorial Coliseum. In September 2016, Hardy was interviewed and reflected upon his career in the NFL. Prior to his death, Hardy was the oldest living member of the inaugural 1946 Los Angeles Rams.
