= Abner Wimberly =

American football player (1926–1976)

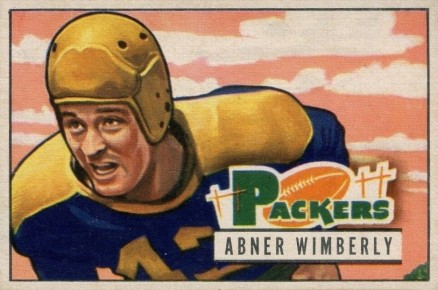
- Wimberly on a 1951 Bowman football card

No. 55, 16, 85
- Positions: Defensive end, end

Personal information
- Born: May 4, 1926; Oak Ridge, Louisiana, U.S.
- Died: September 18, 1976 (aged 50); Oak Ridge, Louisiana, U.S.
- Listed height: 6 ft 1 in (1.85 m)
- Listed weight: 213 lb (97 kg)

Career information
- High school: Oak Ridge
- College: LSU (1943, 1946-1948)
- NFL draft: 1948: 12th round, 99th overall pick

Career history
- Los Angeles Dons (1949); Green Bay Packers (1950–1952)

Awards and highlights
- Pro Bowl (1952); 2× Second-team All-SEC (1947, 1948)

Career NFL/AAFC statistics
- Receptions: 6
- Receiving yards: 50
- Fumble recoveries: 5
- Total touchdowns: 2
- Stats at Pro Football Reference

Abner Wimberly (May 4, 1926 – September 18, 1976) was an American professional football player for three seasons with the Green Bay Packers of the National Football League (NFL). He also played one season in the All-America Football Conference (AAFC) with the Los Angeles Dons. He played college football for the LSU Tigers. He was inducted into the LSU Athletics Hall of Fame in 1949.

Wimberly died on September 18, 1976, in Oak Ridge, Louisiana, from injuries he received in the crash of a private Piper aircraft. He and four other men from Oak Ridge were returning from Baton Rouge where they had attended the LSU – Oregon State football game. Upon attempting to land in heavy fog around midnight, the plane crashed and four men died. There was one survivor. Prior to his death, Abner owned a successful wholesale oil products distribution company in Oak Ridge.
