= Cedars Plantation =

- U.S. National Register of Historic Places
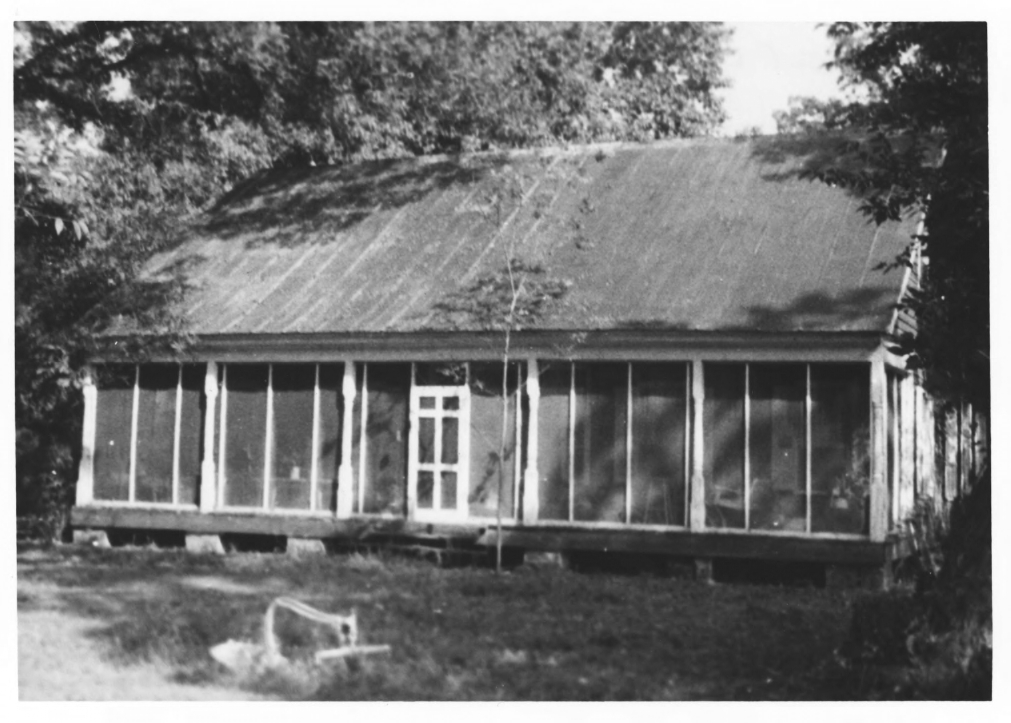

- Location within Louisiana Location within the United States
- Location: Along Lake Irwin Road, about 2.4 miles (3.9 km) southwest of Oak Ridge
- Nearest city: Oak Ridge, Louisiana
- Coordinates: 32°36′51″N 91°48′53″W
- Area: 4 acres (1.6 ha)
- Built: c.1840
- NRHP reference No.: 76000965
- Added to NRHP: May 19, 1976

Cedars Plantation, located along Lake Irwin Road, about 2.4 miles (3.9 km) southwest of Oak Ridge in Morehouse Parish in Louisiana, was built in c.1840 and is believed to be the oldest surviving house in the parish. It has also been known as Williams Home Place. It was listed on the National Register of Historic Places on May 19, 1976.

Its NRHP nomination describes it as "an example of a typical early Louisiana bluffland house. The bluffland house type is a 1 1/2-story frame house with outside end chimneys, gallery, and ell. It is a variation of the dog-trot house type, because it has a wide central hall, although in the bluffland house the hall is enclosed. Structural evidence, family tradition and deduction from known documents indicate that the main part of the house was built no later than the early 1840s, while additions and changes were made around 1870."

It has a central hall with two 18 by 18 feet (5.5 m × 5.5 m) rooms on each side, with 9.33 feet (2.84 m) high ceilings. There are smaller rooms to the rear and a kitchen ell. The house is clad in milled cypress clapboards.

It was built by John Williams for himself and his wife Elizabeth Wooding Williams, who had together moved from Pittsylvania County, Virginia to a 500 acres (2.0 km^{2}) property in what was then Ouachita Parish, Louisiana in 1828. John later obtained another 500 acres in 1833, after which family tradition is that "slaves were sent with ox-drawn wagons on the twelve-day round trip to Natchez, Mississippi to procure milled timber and lumber to build a more suitable dwelling, which resulted in the present house." Their original log house became a kitchen, which has not survived. Besides being the oldest house in Morehouse Parish, the house is important for its surviving early outbuildings which have survived: a carriage house, a log smoke house, a milk house and a cotton house. In 1976 the house was still owned by a descendant of John Williams.

== See also ==
- List of plantations in Louisiana
- National Register of Historic Places listings in Morehouse Parish, Louisiana
