= Phil Tinsley =

American football player (1924–1989)

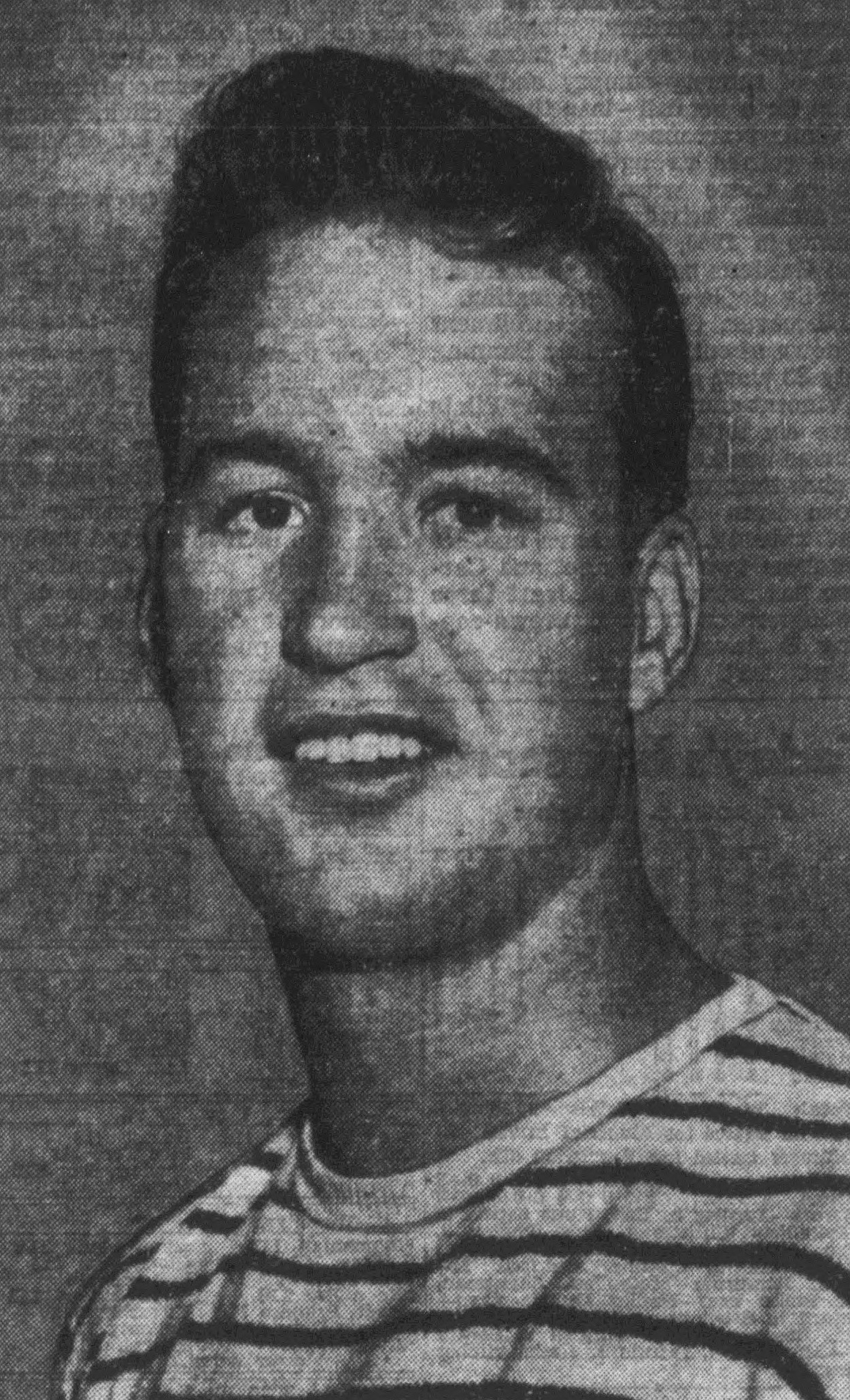
- Tinsley, circa 1946

Profile
- Position: End

Personal information
- Born: January 16, 1924
- Died: July 17, 1989 (aged 65)
- Listed height: 6 ft 1 in (1.85 m)
- Listed weight: 198 lb (90 kg)

Career information
- College: Georgia Tech (1943–1944); Alabama (1942)

Awards and highlights
- Consensus All-American (1944); 2× First-team All-SEC (1943, 1944); Georgia Tech Sports Hall of Fame

Phil R. Tinsley (January 16, 1924 – July 17, 1989) was an American football player who was an All-American end for the Georgia Tech Yellow Jackets football team of the Georgia Institute of Technology.

== Biography ==
Tinsley initially attended the University of Alabama in Tuscaloosa, Alabama, where he played for the Alabama Crimson Tide freshman football team in 1942. He subsequently transferred to Georgia Tech in Atlanta, Georgia, as a member of the V-12 Navy College Training Program – a World War II-era program to train commissioned officers for the U.S. Navy.

At Georgia Tech, Tinsley played for coach William Alexander's Georgia Tech Yellow Jackets during the 1943 and 1944 seasons. He was a prominent member of the Yellow Jackets teams that won Southeastern Conference (SEC) championships in 1943 and 1944, and were invited to back-to-back major post-season bowl games: the Sugar Bowl (January 1, 1944) and Orange Bowl (January 1, 1945). Memorably, he caught a 46-yard touchdown pass from Eddie Prokop in the third quarter of the 1944 Sugar Bowl which provided the Yellow Jackets' margin of victory in their 20–18 win over the Tulsa Golden Hurricane.

Tinsley was a first-team All-SEC selection in 1943 and 1944. He was the Yellow Jackets team captain during his 1944 junior season, and was recognized as a consensus first-team All-American, having received first-team selections from the All-America Board, the Associated Press (AP), Collier's Weekly, International News Service (INS), Look magazine, Newspaper Enterprise Association (NEA), Central Press Association (CPA), Football News, The Sporting News, and Walter Camp.

Tinsley was inducted into the Georgia Tech Sports Hall of Fame in 1970.

== See also ==
- Georgia Tech Yellow Jackets
- List of Georgia Institute of Technology alumni
