= Hamilton Nichols =

American football player (1924–2013)

No. 73, 46
- Positions: Guard, linebacker

Personal information
- Born: October 18, 1924; Houston, Texas, U.S.
- Died: July 6, 2013 (aged 88); Houston, Texas, U.S.
- Listed height: 5 ft 11 in (1.80 m)
- Listed weight: 209 lb (95 kg)

Career information
- High school: Lamar (Houston)
- College: Rice
- NFL draft: 1946: 4th round, 26th overall pick

Career history
- Chicago Cardinals (1947–1949); Green Bay Packers (1951)

Awards and highlights
- NFL champion (1947); Western Conference Champion (1948); First-team All-American (1944)

Career NFL statistics
- Games played: 43
- Games started: 16
- Fumble recoveries: 1
- Stats at Pro Football Reference

Hamilton J. Nichols Jr. (October 18, 1924 – July 6, 2013) was an American professional football player who was a guard in the National Football League (NFL). He played his first three seasons with the Chicago Cardinals.

After a season away from the NFL, he played with the Green Bay Packers during the 1951 NFL season. Nichols played college football for the Rice Owls and was a member of the 1944 College Football All-America Team.

Nichols was initially drafted by the Packers with the 318th pick of the 1945 NFL draft, but he was ruled not yet eligible for selection and the choice was forfeited. He was properly drafted in the 1946 NFL draft by the Cardinals, who used the 26th overall pick in making the selection.
