= 1947 All-SEC football team =

American college football all-star team

The 1947 All-SEC football team consists of American football players selected to the All-Southeastern Conference (SEC) chosen by various selectors for the 1947 college football season. Ole Miss won the conference.

== All-SEC selections ==
=== Ends ===
- Barney Poole, Ole Miss (College Football Hall of Fame) (AP-1, UP)
- John North, Vanderbilt (AP-2, UP)
- Dan Edwards, Georgia (AP-1)
- Abner Wimberly, LSU (AP-2)
- Rebel Steiner, Alabama (AP-3)
- George Brodnax, Georgia Tech (AP-3)

=== Tackles ===
- Bobby Davis, Georgia Tech (AP-1, UP)
- Dub Garrett, Miss. St. (AP-1, UP)
- Bill Erickson, Ole Miss (AP-2)
- Wash Serini, Kentucky (AP-2)
- Denny Crawford, Tennessee (AP-3)
- Charles Compton, Alabama (AP-3)

=== Guards ===
- John Wozniak, Alabama (AP-1, UP)
- Bill Healy, Georgia Tech (AP-1, UP)
- Herbert St. John, Georgia (AP-2)
- Tex Robertson, Vanderbilt (AP-2)
- Wren Worley, LSU (AP-3)
- Lee Yarutis, Kentucky (AP-3)

=== Centers ===
- Jay Rhodemyre, Kentucky (AP-1, UP)
- Vaughn Mancha, Alabama (AP-2)
- Louis Hook, Georgia Tech (AP-3)

=== Quarterbacks ===
- Charlie Conerly, Ole Miss (College Football Hall of Fame) (AP-1, UP)
- Y. A. Tittle, LSU (AP-2, UP)
- John Rauch, Georgia (College Football Hall of Fame) (AP-2)
- Harper Davis, Miss. St. (AP-3)

=== Halfbacks ===
- Harry Gilmer, Alabama (College Football Hall of Fame) (AP-1, UP)
- Shorty McWilliams, Miss. St. (AP-1)
- Bobby Forbes, Florida (AP-2)
- Bobby Berry, Vanderbilt (AP-3)
- Allen Bowen, Georgia Tech (AP-3)

=== Fullbacks ===
- Lowell Tew, Alabama (AP-2, UP)
- Albin "Rip" Collins, LSU (AP-1)
- Eddie Price, Tulane (College Football Hall of Fame) (AP-3)

== Key ==
AP = Associated Press

UP = United Press

Bold = Consensus first-team selection by both AP and UPI

== See also ==
- 1947 College Football All-America Team
