= Bob Davis (tackle) =

American football player (1927–2010)

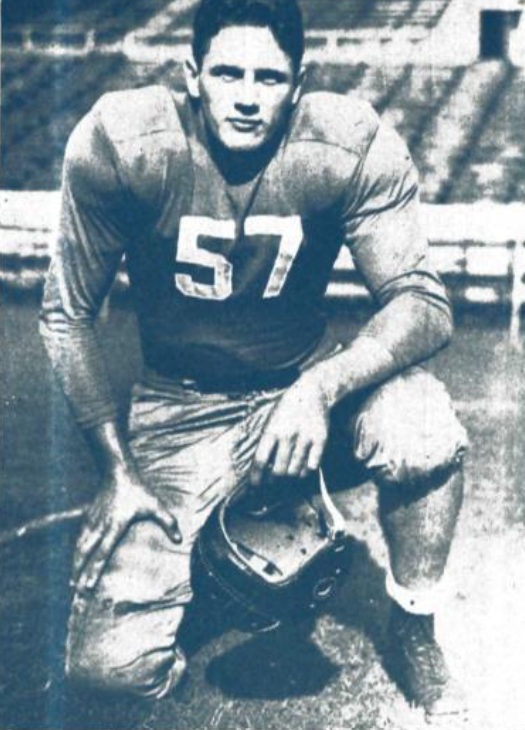
- Davis, c. 1946

No. 59
- Position: Offensive tackle

Personal information
- Born: May 3, 1927; Columbus, Georgia, U.S.
- Died: June 12, 2010 (aged 83); Gastonia, North Carolina, U.S.
- Listed height: 6 ft 4 in (1.93 m)
- Listed weight: 235 lb (107 kg)

Career information
- High school: Jordan Vocational (Columbus)
- College: Georgia Tech
- NFL draft: 1947: 6th round, 44th overall pick

Career history
- Boston Yanks (1948)

Awards and highlights
- Consensus All-American (1947); Second-team All-American (1946); 3× First-team All-SEC (1945, 1946, 1947)

Career NFL statistics
- Games played: 12
- Stats at Pro Football Reference
- College Football Hall of Fame

Robert Thomas Davis Jr. (May 3, 1927 – June 12, 2010) was an American professional football player who was an offensive tackle in the National Football League (NFL).

Davis was born and raised in Columbus, Georgia and played scholastically at Jordan Vocational High School. He played collegiately for the Georgia Tech football team, where he was a member of Chi Phi fraternity. He was named to the All-SEC first-team three times (1945, 1946, and 1947), and was a two-time All-American, earning second-team honors in 1946, and a consensus selection in 1947. He was inducted into the College Football Hall of Fame in 1978.

Davis was selected by the New York Giants 44th overall in the sixth round of the 1947 NFL draft. He played one season in the NFL (1948), with the Boston Yanks, appearing in 12 of their 14 games.

In 1956, he was mayor of Columbus, Georgia.

| Preceded by C. Ed Berry | Mayor of Columbus, Georgia; 1956 | Succeeded by B. F. Register |
