= Shorty McWilliams =

American football player (1926–1997)

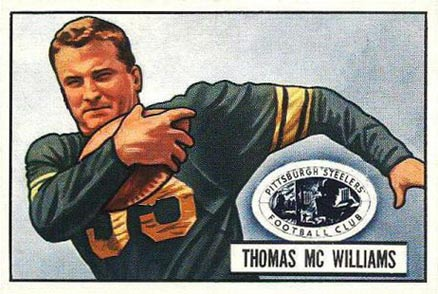
- McWilliams on a 1951 Bowman football card

No. 92, 44
- Positions: Defensive back, halfback

Personal information
- Born: May 12, 1926; Newton, Mississippi, U.S.
- Died: January 9, 1997 (aged 70); Meridian, Mississippi, U.S.
- Listed height: 5 ft 11 in (1.80 m)
- Listed weight: 185 lb (84 kg)

Career information
- High school: Meridian
- College: Mississippi State (1944, 1946-1948); Army (1945)
- NFL draft: 1948: 8th round, 62nd overall pick

Career history
- Los Angeles Dons (1949); Pittsburgh Steelers (1950)

Awards and highlights
- National champion (1945); First-team All-American (1945); Second-team All-American (1944); SEC Player of the Year (1944); 4× First-Team All-SEC (1944, 1946, 1947, 1948)

Career NFL/AAFC statistics
- Rushing yards: 54
- Rushing average: 4.2
- Interceptions: 4
- Stats at Pro Football Reference

Thomas Edward "Shorty" McWilliams (May 12, 1926 – January 9, 1997) was an American football player who played one season with the Pittsburgh Steelers of the National Football League (NFL). He was drafted by the Chicago Bears in the eighth round of the 1948 NFL draft and the Los Angeles Dons in the 16th round of the 1948 AAFC Draft. He played college football at Mississippi State University and the United States Military Academy.

== Early life and college ==
McWilliams attended Meridian High School in Meridian, Mississippi.

McWilliams first played for the Mississippi State Bulldogs of Mississippi State University in 1944 and again from 1946 to 1948. He recorded career totals of 1,808 rushing yards and 19 rushing touchdowns for the Bulldogs. In 1944, he was an Associated Press Second Team All-American, the Southeastern Conference Player of the Year and ranked tenth in the Heisman Trophy vote. McWilliams was a First Team All-SEC selection all four years he played for the Bulldogs. He was inducted into the Mississippi Sports Hall of Fame in 1963 and the Mississippi State Sports Hall of Fame in 1970. In 2014, McWilliams became the sixth Bulldog to be inducted into the Mississippi State Ring of Honor.

McWilliams played for the Army Black Knights of the United States Military Academy in 1945. He was ranked eighth in the Heisman Trophy vote, while the Black Knights finished 9–0 and were named consensus national champions.

== Professional career ==
McWilliams was drafted by the Chicago Bears in the eighth round with the 62nd pick in the 1948 NFL draft.

McWilliams was drafted by the Los Angeles Dons with the 101st pick in the 1948 AAFC Draft. He played in 11 games for the Dons in 1949, starting two.

McWilliams was selected by the Pittsburgh Steelers in the third round of the 1950 AAFC dispersal draft. He played in ten games for the Steelers in 1950. His career was shortened by a knee injury.

== Personal life ==
McWilliams had four daughters and was married to Gloria Weidmann. McWilliams's brother, Billy, played football at Meridian High and LSU. Shorty became owner of Weidmann's Restaurant in Meridian, Mississippi in 1955. He was also a Korean War veteran.
