= 1945 All-America college football team =

Official list of the best college football players of 1945

The 1945 All-America college football team is composed of college football players who were selected as All-Americans by various organizations and writers that chose All-America college football teams in 1945. The nine selectors recognized by the NCAA as "official" for the 1945 season are (1) Collier's Weekly, as selected by Grantland Rice, (2) the Associated Press, (3) the United Press, (4) the All-America Board, (5) the American Football Coaches Association (AFCA), (6) the Football Writers Association of America (FWAA), (7) the International News Service (INS), (8) Look magazine, (9) the Newspaper Enterprise Association (NEA) and (10) the Sporting News.

== Consensus All-Americans ==
For the year 1945, the NCAA recognizes 10 published All-American teams as "official" designations for purposes of its consensus determinations. The following chart identifies the NCAA-recognized consensus All-Americans and displays which first-team designations they received.

Name	Position	School	Number	Official selectors	Other selectors
Glenn Davis	Halfback	Army	10/10	AAB, AFCA, AP, COL, FWAA, INS, LK, NEA, SN, UP	CNS, CP, NL, NYS, OF, WC, YA
Doc Blanchard	Fullback	Army	10/10	AAB, AFCA, AP, COL, FWAA, INS, LK, NEA, SN, UP	CNS, CP, NL NYS, OF, WC, YA
Tex Coulter	Tackle	Army	9/10	AAB, AFCA, AP, COL FWAA, INS, NEA, SN, UP	CNS, CP, NL, NYS, OF, WC
Warren Amling	Guard	Ohio State	9/10	AAB, AFCA, AP, COL, FWAA, INS, LK, SN, UP	CNS, CP, NL, NYS, OF, WC
Herman Wedemeyer	Halfback	St. Mary's (CA)	9/10	AAB, AFCA, AP, COL, FWAA, INS, LK, SN, UP	CNS, CP, NL, OF, WC
John Green	Guard	Army	7/10	AAB, AFCA, AP, COL, FWAA, SN, UP	CNS, NYS, OF, WC
George Savitsky	Tackle	Penn	7/10	AAB, AFCA, COL, FWAA, LK, SN, UP	CNS, CP, WC
Bob Fenimore	Halfback	Oklahoma St.	7/10	AAB, AFCA, AP, FWAA, INS, SN, UP	WC
Dick Duden	End	Navy	6/10	AAB, AFCA, AP, COL, FWAA, SN, UP	CNS, CP, NL, NYS, OF WC, YA
Vaughn Mancha	Center	Alabama	6/10	AP, COL, FWAA, INS, SN, UP	CNS, CP, NYS, OF, YA
Max Morris	End	Northwestern	3/10	AAB, AFCA, INS	WC, YA
Hub Bechtol	End	Texas	3/10	AP, COL, LK	CNS
Bob Ravensberg	End	Indiana	3/10	FWAA, LK, SN	CP
Harry Gilmer	Quarterback	Alabama	3/10	COL, LK, SN	CNS, NL, NYS, OF

== All-American selections for 1945 ==
=== Ends ===
- Dick Duden, Navy (College Football Hall of Fame) (AAB; AFCA; AP-1; COL-1; FWAA-1; INS-2; SN; UP-1; YA; CNS-1; CP-1; NL; NYS; OF-1; WC-1)
- Hub Bechtol, Texas (College Football Hall of Fame) (AP-1; COL-1; FWAA-2; LK; CNS-1; CP-2)
- Bob Ravensberg, Indiana (UP-2; FWAA-1; SN; CP-1; INS-2; LK; CNS-2)
- Max Morris, Northwestern (AAB; AFCA; AP-2; FWAA-2; INS-1; UP-2; YA; CP-2; WC-1)
- Hank Foldberg, Army (AP-2; INS-1; NEA-1; UP-1; CNS-2; CP-3; NYS; OF-1)
- Henry Walker, Virginia (AP-3)
- Neill Armstrong, Oklahoma A&M (AP-3)
- Paul Walker, Yale (CP-3; NL)
- Richard Pitzer, Army (NEA-1)

=== Tackles ===
- Tex Coulter, Army (AAB; AFCA; AP-1; COL-1; FWAA-1; INS-1; NEA-1; SN; UP-1; CNS-1; CP-1; NL; NYS; OF-1; WC-1)
- George Savitsky, Penn (College Football Hall of Fame) (AAB; AFCA; AP-3; COL-1; FWAA-1; INS-2; LK; SN; UP-1; CNS-1; CP-1; WC-1)
- Albert Nemetz, Army (AP-1; FWAA-2; INS-2; NEA-1; UP-2; YA; NYS; CNS-2)
- Tom Hughes, Purdue (LK; FWAA-2; UP-2; CP-2; OF-1; CNS-2; NL)
- Thomas Dean, Southern Methodist Univ. (AP-2; YA)
- Mike Castronis, Georgia (INS-1)
- Jim Kekeris, Missouri (AP-2; CP-2)
- Clarence Esser, Wisconsin (AP-3)
- Buster McClure, Nevada (CP-3)
- Monte Moncrief, Texas A&M (CP-3)

=== Guards ===
- Warren Amling, Ohio State (College Football Hall of Fame) (AAB; AFCA; AP-1; COL-1; FWAA-1; INS-1; LK; SN; UP-1; CNS-1; CP-1; NL; NYS; OF-1; WC-1)
- John Green, Army (College Football Hall of Fame) (AAB; AFCA; AP-1; COL-1; FWAA-1; SN; UP-1; CNS-1; CP-3; NEA-1; YA; NYS; OF-1; WC-1)
- Al Sparlis, UCLA (College Football Hall of Fame) (AP-3; INS-2; LK; CNS-2; CP-1)
- John Mastrangelo, Notre Dame (AP-2; FWAA-2; INS-1; UP-2; YA; CNS-2; CP-2)
- James Carrington, Navy (FWAA-2; INS-2; UP-2)
- Joseph Dickinson, Penn (AP-2; CP-2)
- Jim Lecture, Northwestern (AP-3; CP-3)
- Arthur Gerometta, Army (NEA-1)
- Hills, Georgia Tech (NL)

=== Centers ===
- Vaughn Mancha, Alabama (College Football Hall of Fame) (AP-1; COL-1; FWAA-1; INS-1; SN; UP-1; YA; CNS-1; CP-1; NYS; OF-1)
- Dick Scott, Navy (College Football Hall of Fame) (AAB; AFCA; AP-2; FWAA-2; INS-2; LK; UP-2; CNS-2; CP-2; NL; WC-1)
- Ralph Jenkins, Clemson (AP-3)
- Harold Watts, Michigan (CP-3)
- Herschel Fuson, Army (NEA-1)

=== Quarterbacks ===
- Harry Gilmer, Alabama (College Football Hall of Fame) (AP-2; COL-1; INS-2; LK; UP-2; FWAA-2; SN; UP-2; CNS-1; CP-2; NL; NYS; OF-1 [qb])
- Frank Dancewicz, Notre Dame (AP-2; FWAA-2; UP-2; CNS-2; CP-1)
- Arnold Tucker, Army (College Football Hall of Fame) (CP-3; INS-2; NEA-1)
- Gene Rossides, Columbia (CP-3)

=== Halfbacks ===
- Glenn Davis, Army (College Football Hall of Fame) (AAB; AFCA; AP-1; COL-1; FWAA-1; INS-1; LK; NEA-1; SN; UP-1; YA; CNS-1; CP-1; NL; NYS; OF-1; WC-1)
- Herman Wedemeyer, St. Mary's (Calif.) (College Football Hall of Fame) (AAB; AFCA; AP-1; COL-1; FWAA-1; INS-1; LK; SN; UP-1; CNS-1; CP-1; NL; OF-1; WC-1)
- Bob Fenimore, Oklahoma State (College Football Hall of Fame) (AAB; AFCA; AP-1; FWAA-1; INS-1; SN; UP-1; CP-2; CNS-2; WC-1)
- Jake Leicht, Oregon (YA; NYS)
- George Taliaferro, Indiana (AP-3; INS-2; CP-3; CNS-2)
- Clyde Scott, Navy (College Football Hall of Fame) (AP-3; UP-2)
- Stan Kozlowski, Holy Cross (AP-3; CP-2)
- Robert Evans, Penn (AP-3)
- Shorty McWilliams, Army (NEA-1)

=== Fullbacks ===
- Doc Blanchard, Army (College Football Hall of Fame) (AAB; AFCA; AP-1; COL-1; FWAA-1; INS-1; LK; NEA-1; SN; UP-1; YA; CNS-1; CP-1; NL; NYS; OF-1; WC-1)
- Pete Pihos, Indiana (College and Pro Football Hall of Fame) (AP-2; FWAA-2; UP-2; CNS-2; CP-2; YA)
- Ollie Cline, Ohio State (AP-2; FWAA-2)
- Walt Schlinkman, Texas Tech (INS-2)
- Ed Cody, Purdue (CP-3)

== Black college All-Americans ==
During the 1940s, African-Americans were excluded from many college football programs and played the game at historically black colleges and universities (HBCUs). The major All-America selectors in these years did not include players from HBCUs. However, The Pittsburgh Courier each year selected its own All-America team from players at the HBCUS. The players chosen for 1946 were:

- Clarence Harkings, Langston, end
- Talmadge Owen, Clark, end
- James Moore, Wilberforce, tackle
- Wilfred Rawl, West Virginia State, tackle
- Richard Bolton, Clark, guard
- Willie Moses, Wiley, guard
- Isaiah Wilson, West Virginia State, center
- Leroy Cromartie, Florida A&M, back
- Bill Bass, Tennessee A&I, back
- Shelly Ross, Wiley, back
- Bernard Ingraham, Florida A&M, back

== Key ==
- **Bold** – Consensus All-American
- -1 – First-team selection
- -2 – Second-team selection
- -3 – Third-team selection

=== Official selectors ===
- AAB = All-America Board
- AFCA = American Football Coaches Association
- AP = Associated Press
- COL = Collier's Weekly as selected by Grantland Rice
- FWAA = Football Writers Association of America
- INS = International News Service, "selected on the basis of ballots and information gathered from International News Service sports writers and football authorities all over the nation"
- LK = Look magazine
- NEA = Newspaper Enterprise Association. In a departure from normal practice, the NEA named the starters from the Army football team, which had won 17 straight games, as its All-American team for 1945I
- SN = Sporting News, selected by a poll of 163 sports writers and sportscasters
- UP = United Press

=== Other selectors ===
- CNS = Consensus All-American team picked based on assigning points to players selected as All-Americans by Oscar Fraley, Christy Walsh, United Press, Look, New York Sun, New York News, International News, Associated Press, Sporting News, and Collier's-Rice
- CP = Central Press Association, selected for the 15th straight year with the aid of the captains of the leading college teams
- NL = Navy Log
- NYS = New York Sun
- OF = Oscar Fraley, United Press sports writer
- WC = Walter Camp Football Foundation
- YA = Yank, the Army Weekly, based on a poll of 25 of the country's most widely known college football coaches

== See also ==
- 1945 All-Big Six Conference football team
- 1945 All-Big Ten Conference football team
- 1945 All-Pacific Coast Conference football team
- 1945 All-SEC football team
- 1945 All-Southwest Conference football team
