= John Green (guard) =

American football player (1924–1981)

Biographical details
- Born: September 15, 1924; Kent, Indiana, U.S.
- Died: August 4, 1981 (aged 56); Nashville, Tennessee, U.S.

Playing career
- 1942: Tulane
- 1943–1945: Army
- Position: Guard

Coaching career (HC unless noted)
- 1946: Army (assistant)
- 1954–1959: Tulane (line)
- 1960–1962: Florida (assistant)
- 1963–1966: Vanderbilt
- 1967: Kansas (assistant)

Head coaching record
- Overall: 7–29–4

Accomplishments and honors

Championships
- 2× National (1944, 1945)

Awards
- Consensus All-American (1945); First-team All-American (1944); 2× First-team All-Eastern (1944, 1945)
- College Football Hall of Fame; Inducted in 1989 (profile)

John Green (September 15, 1924 – August 4, 1981) was an American football player and coach. He played college football at Tulane University in 1942 and was then appointed to the United States Military Academy where he played from 1943 to 1945. At Army, Green was a two-time All-American and played on consecutive national championship-winning teams in 1944 and 1945. Green served as the head football coach at Vanderbilt University from 1963 to 1966, compiling a record of 7–29–4. He was elected to the College Football Hall of Fame as a player in 1989.

== Head coaching record ==
Year	Team	Overall	Conference	Standing	Bowl/playoffs
Vanderbilt Commodores (Southeastern Conference) (1963–1966)
1963	Vanderbilt	1–7–2	0–5–2	10th	
1964	Vanderbilt	3–6–1	1–4–1	9th	
1965	Vanderbilt	2–7–1	1–5	T–9th	
1966	Vanderbilt	1–9	0–6	T–th	
Vanderbilt:		7–29–4	2–20–3		
Total:		7–29–4			
