= John Wozniak (gridiron football) =

American football player (1921–1982)

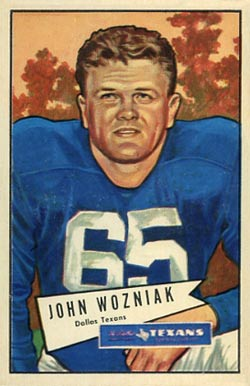
- Wozniak on a 1952 Bowman football card

No. 35, 65, 41
- Positions: Guard, Linebacker

Personal information
- Born: August 2, 1921); Arnold City, Pennsylvania, U.S.
- Died: August 26, 1982 (aged 61); Tuscaloosa, Alabama, U.S.
- Listed height: 6 ft 0 in (1.83 m)
- Listed weight: 218 lb (99 kg)

Career information
- High school: Marion (Fairhope, Pennsylvania)
- College: Alabama (1944–1947)
- NFL draft: 1948: 5th round, 34th overall pick

Career history
- Brooklyn Dodgers (1948); New York Yankees (1949); New York Yanks (1950–1951); Dallas Texans (1952); Saskatchewan Roughriders (1953–1956)

Awards and highlights
- Pro Bowl (1952); 3× CFL All-Star (1953, 54, 56); 2× First-team All-SEC (1944, 1947)

Career NFL/AAFC statistics
- Games played: 62
- Games started: 54
- Fumble recoveries: 3
- Stats at Pro Football Reference

John Edward Wozniak (August 2, 1921 – August 26, 1982) was an American professional football offensive guard who played nine seasons in the All-America Football Conference (AAFC), the National Football League (NFL) and the Canadian Football League (CFL). He was selected by the Pittsburgh Steelers in the 1948 NFL draft and the Brooklyn Dodgers in the 1948 AAFC draft.
