= Dick Duden =

American football player (1924–2013)

No. 87
- Position: End

Personal information
- Born: November 24, 1924; Pottstown, Pennsylvania, U.S.
- Died: March 31, 2013 (aged 88); Severna Park, Maryland, U.S.
- Listed height: 6 ft 3 in (1.91 m)
- Listed weight: 212 lb (96 kg)

Career information
- High school: Phillips Andover Academy (Andover, Massachusetts)
- College: Navy

Career history
- New York Giants (1949)

Awards and highlights
- Consensus All-American (1945); First-team All-Eastern (1945)
- Stats at Pro Football Reference
- College Football Hall of Fame

Henry Richard Duden, Jr. (November 24, 1924 – March 31, 2013) was an American football player who was an end in the National Football League (NFL) for the New York Giants. He played college football for the United States Naval Academy and was inducted into the College Football Hall of Fame in 2001.

Duden died at his home on March 31, 2013, at the age of 88.
