= Roger Harding (American football) =

American football player (1923–2009)

No. 15, 72, 55, 43, 31
- Positions: Center, linebacker

Personal information
- Born: June 11, 1923; Oakland, California, U.S.
- Died: January 8, 2009 (aged 85)
- Listed height: 6 ft 2 in (1.88 m)
- Listed weight: 217 lb (98 kg)

Career information
- High school: Lafayette (CA) Acalanes
- College: California
- NFL draft: 1945: 5th round, 37th overall pick

Career history
- Cleveland / Los Angeles Rams (1945–1946); Philadelphia Eagles (1947); Detroit Lions (1948); New York Bulldogs (1949); Green Bay Packers (1949)

Awards and highlights
- NFL champion (1945); First-team All-PCC (1944)

Career NFL statistics
- Interceptions: 3
- Games played: 42
- Games started: 5
- Stats at Pro Football Reference

Roger Paul Harding (June 11, 1923 – January 8, 2009) was a center in the National Football League (NFL).

== Biography ==
Harding was born Roger Paul Harding on June 11, 1923, in Oakland, California.

== Career ==
Harding was drafted in the fifth round of the 1945 NFL draft by the Cleveland Rams and played with the team for two seasons, including during the franchise's move to Los Angeles, California. He would spend the following two seasons with the Philadelphia Eagles and the Detroit Lions before splitting the 1949 NFL season between the New York Bulldogs and the Green Bay Packers.

He played at the collegiate level at the University of California, Berkeley.
