= 1944 All-Pacific Coast football team =

American all-star college football team

The 1944 All-Pacific Coast football team consists of American football players chosen by various organizations for All-Pacific Coast teams for the 1944 college football season. The organizations selecting teams in 1944 included the Associated Press (AP) and the United Press (UP).

The USC Trojans won the Pacific Coast Conference (PCC) championship with an 8–0–2 record, finished the season ranked #7 in the final AP Poll, and had five players named to the first team by either the AP or UP: halfbacks Gordon Gray (AP, UP) and Jim Hardy (AP, UP), ends Jim Callanan (AP, UP) and Don Hardy (AP, UP), and tackle John Ferraro (AP, UP).

The Washington Huskies finished second in the PCC with a 5-3-0 record and placed two players on the first team: quarterback Keith DeCourcey (AP, UP) and guard Jim McCurdy (AP, UP). Despite a 3-6-1 record, the California Golden Bears also placed two players on the first team: guard Bill Hachten (AP, UP) and center Roger Harding (AP, UP).

Two players from teams outside the PCC received first-team honors. They were tackles James Turner of the Pacific Tigers (coached by Amos Alonzo Stagg) and Bob McClure (UP) of Nevada.

== All-Pacific Coast selections ==
=== Backs ===
- Keith DeCourcey, Washington (AP-1; UP-1)
- Gordon Gray, USC (AP-1; UP-1)
- Jim Hardy, USC (AP-1; UP-1)
- John Roesch, UCLA (AP-1; UP-1)
- Bob Waterfield, UCLA (AP-2, UP-2)
- Dick Ottele, Washington (AP-2, UP-2)
- Jack Myers, UCLA (AP-2, UP-2)
- Duane Whitehead, USC (AP-2)
- Alf Sorensen, Nevada (UP-2)

=== Ends ===
- James Callanan, USC (AP-1; UP-1)
- Don Hardy, USC (AP-1; UP-1)
- Dave Hirschler, California (AP-2, UP-2)
- Dick Hagen, Washington (AP-2)
- Henry Melusky, Washington (UP-2)

=== Tackles ===
- John Ferraro, USC (AP-1; UP-1)
- James Turner, Pacific (AP-1, UP-2)
- Bob McClure, Nevada (AP-2; UP-1)
- Marshall Romer, USC (AP-2)
- Henry Borghi, California (UP-2)

=== Guards ===
- Bill Hachten, California (AP-1; UP-1)
- Jim McCurdy, Washington (AP-1; UP-1)
- Dick Madigan, California (AP-2, UP-2)
- John Simons, UCLA (AP-2, UP-2)

=== Centers ===
- Roger Harding, California (AP-1; UP-1)
- Gordon Berlin, Washington (AP-2, UP-2)

== Key ==
AP = Associated Press

UP = United Press

Bold = Consensus first-team selection of both the AP and UP

== See also ==
- 1944 College Football All-America Team
