= George Savitsky =

American football player (1924–2012)

No. 75, 64
- Position: Offensive tackle

Personal information
- Born: July 30, 1924; New York City, U.S.
- Died: September 4, 2012 (aged 88); Somers Point, New Jersey, U.S.
- Listed height: 6 ft 2 in (1.88 m)
- Listed weight: 244 lb (111 kg)

Career information
- High school: Camden (Camden, New Jersey)
- College: Penn
- NFL draft: 1947: 5th round, 30th overall pick

Career history
- Philadelphia Eagles (1948–1949)

Awards and highlights
- 2× NFL champion (1948, 1949); Consensus All-American (1945); 3× First-team All-American (1944, 1946, 1947); 2× First-team All-Eastern (1944, 1945)

Career NFL statistics
- Games played: 24
- Fumble recoveries: 2
- Stats at Pro Football Reference
- College Football Hall of Fame

George Michael Savitsky (July 30, 1924 – September 4, 2012) was an American professional football offensive tackle in the National Football League (NFL) for the Philadelphia Eagles.

Born in New York City, Savitsky grew up in Camden, New Jersey and played football at Camden High School where he was captain of the undefeated squad in 1942.

He played college football at the University of Pennsylvania where he excelled as both an offensive and defensive tackle, and became the only four-year All American of the 20th century. At Penn, he was a member of Phi Sigma Kappa. During the summers of his college years, the versatile Savitsky taught swimming and diving at the Flanders Hotel pools in Ocean City, NJ. He was drafted by the Eagles in the fifth round of the 1947 NFL draft.

Savitsky was inducted into the College Football Hall of Fame in 1991.

Savitsky, at 6 feet 3 inches (1.91 m) and 252 pounds (114 kg), is considered one of best two-way tackles in the history of college football. While at Penn, he helped to mentor fellow college All-Americans Tony Minisi and college and pro football Hall of Famer Chuck Bednarik. Due to the low pay scale in the NFL in the late 1940s, he retired from pro football and entered dental school; thereafter he enjoyed a long and successful career as a dentist in southern New Jersey. For years, Savitsky was a member of the "Mungermen," a group of former Penn players under Hall-of-Fame coach George Munger who gathered periodically on game days.

A resident of Ocean City, New Jersey, he died of pneumonia in Somers Point, New Jersey in 2012 at the age of 88.
