= Herbert St. John =

American football player (1926–2011)

Herb St. John
No. 34
- Position: Guard

Personal information
- Born: January 17, 1926; Perry, Florida, U.S.
- Died: June 29, 2011 (aged 85); Perry, Georgia, U.S.
- Listed height: 5 ft 10 in (1.78 m)
- Listed weight: 215 lb (98 kg)

Career information
- High school: Andrew Jackson (Jacksonville, Florida)
- College: Georgia (1944-1947)
- NFL draft: 1948: 21st round, 191st overall pick

Career history
- Brooklyn Dodgers (1948); Chicago Hornets (1949)

Awards and highlights
- Third-team All-American (1946); 2× First-team All-SEC (1944, 1946); 2× Second-team All-SEC (1945, 1947); University of Georgia Circle of Honor (2004); Georgia Sports Hall of Fame (2009)

Career AAFC statistics
- Games played: 21
- Games started: 14
- Stats at Pro Football Reference

Herbert LeGrande St. John (January 17, 1926 — June 29, 2011) was an American professional football guard. He played two seasons in the All-America Football Conference (AAFC).
