= 1944 All-America college football team =

Official list of the best college football players of 1944

The 1944 All-America college football team is composed of college football players who were selected as All-Americans by various organizations and writers that chose All-America college football teams in 1944. The nine selectors recognized by the NCAA as "official" for the 1944 season are (1) Collier's Weekly, as selected by Grantland Rice, (2) the Associated Press, (3) the United Press, (4) the All-America Board, (5) Football News, (6) the International News Service (INS), (7) Look magazine, (8) the Newspaper Enterprise Association (NEA) and (9) the Sporting News.

Ohio State quarterback Les Horvath and Navy tackle Don Whitmire were the only players unanimously chosen as first-team player by all of the official selectors. Horvath won the 1944 Heisman Trophy as the Buckeyes turned in a 9–0 record and finished second in the national polls. Whitmire later served in Vietnam and held the rank of rear admiral.

Georgia Tech end Phil Tinsley received first-team honors from eight of the nine official selectors, and Army backfield duo of Glenn Davis and Doc Blanchard each received seven first-team honors.

== Consensus All-Americans ==
For the year 1944, the NCAA recognizes nine published All-American teams as "official" designations for purposes of its consensus determinations. The following chart identifies the NCAA-recognized consensus All-Americans and displays which first-team designations they received.

Name	Position	School	Number	Official selectors	Other selectors
Don Whitmire	Tackle	Navy	9/9	AAB, AP, COL, FN, INS, LK, NEA, SN, UP	CP, FWAA, WC
Les Horvath	Quarterback	Ohio State	9/9	AAB, AP, COL, FN, INS, LK, NEA, SN, UP	CP, FWAA, WC
Phil Tinsley	End	Georgia Tech	8/9	AAB, AP, COL, FN, INS, LK, NEA, SN	CP, WC
Glenn Davis	Halfback	Army	7/9	AAB, AP, FN, INS, NEA, SN, UP	CP, FWAA, WC
Creighton Miller	Halfback	Notre Dame	7/9	AAB, AP, COL, FN, INS, SN, UP	--
Doc Blanchard	Fullback	Army	7/9	AAB, AP, FN, INS, LK, SN, UP	CP, FWAA, WC
John Ferraro	Tackle	USC	6/9	AAB, AP, COL, FN, INS, NEA	CP, FWAA, WC
Ben Chase	Guard	Navy	5/9	AAB, FN, INS, SN, UP	CP, WC
Paul Walker	End	Yale	4/9	COL, FN, LK, NEA	CP, FWAA
Bill Hackett	Guard	Ohio State	4/9	AAB, AP, COL, FN	CP, FWAA, WC
John Tavener	Center	Indiana	4/9	UP, FWAA, INS, LK	CP, FWAA
Bob Odell	Halfback	Penn	4/9	AP, CO, INS, LK	NYS
Jack Dugger	End	Ohio State	3/9	INS, SN, UP	FWAA, WC

== All-American selections for 1944 ==
=== Ends ===
- Phil Tinsley, Georgia Tech (AAB; AP-1; COL; FN; FWAA-2; INS-1; LK; NEA; SN; UP-2; CP-1; WC)
- Paul Walker, Yale (COL; FN; FWAA-1; INS-2; LK; NEA; UP-2; CP-1)
- Jack Dugger, Ohio State (AAB; AP-3; FWAA-1; INS-1; SN; UP-1; CP-2; WC)
- Hub Bechtol, Texas (College Football Hall of Fame) (AP-1)
- Henry Walker, Virginia (AP-2)
- Leon Bramlett, Navy(AP-2)
- Barney Poole, Army (College Football Hall of Fame) (AP-3; UP-1; INS-2; CP-2)
- Frank Bauman, Purdue (UP-3; FWAA-2)
- Ben Martin, Navy (UP-3)
- Art Renner, Michigan (UP-4)

=== Tackles ===
- Don Whitmire, Navy (College Football Hall of Fame) (AAB; AP-1; COL; FN; FWAA-1; INS-1; LK; NEA; SN; UP-1; CP-1; WC)
- John Ferraro, USC (College Football Hall of Fame) (AAB; AP-1; COL; FN; FWAA-1; INS-1; NEA [g]; UP-2; CP-1; WC)
- George Savitsky, Penn (College Football Hall of Fame) (NEA; UP-3)
- Bill Willis, Ohio State (College and Pro Football Hall of Fame) (AP-2; FWAA-2; INS-2; LK; SN; UP-1)
- Milan Lazetich, Michigan (AP-2; FWAA-2; INS-2; UP-3; CP-2)
- Monte Moncrief, Texas A&M (AP-3)
- Robert McClure, Nevada (AP-3; UP-4)
- DeWitt "Tex" Coulter, Army (UP-2)
- George Owen, Wake Forest (UP-4)
- George Sullivan, Notre Dame (UP-4; CP-2)

=== Guards ===
- Bill Hackett, Ohio State (AAB; AP-1; COL; FN; FWAA-1; INS-2; UP-2; CP-1; WC)
- Ben Chase, Navy (AAB; FN; FWAA-2; INS-1; SN; UP-1; CP-1; WC)
- Hamilton Nichols, Rice (AP-1)
- Joe Stanowicz, Army (FWAA-1; INS-1; UP-1; CP-2)
- Clyde Flowers, TCU (NEA)
- John Green, Army (College Football Hall of Fame) (AP-2; COL; INS-2)
- Bill Hachten, California (AP-2; UP-4; LK)
- Ralph Serpico, Illinois (AP-3; SN; UP-3; FWAA-2)
- Bob Dobelstein, Tennessee (AP-3)
- Pat Filley, Notre Dame (UP-2)
- Ellis Jones, Tulsa (UP-3; CP-2; LK)
- Ernie Knotts, Duke (UP-4)

=== Centers ===
- John Tavener, Indiana (College Football Hall of Fame) (UP-1; FWAA-1; INS-1; LK; CP-1)
- Caleb Warrington, Auburn (AAB; AP-1; COL; FWAA-2; INS-2; NEA; SN; UP-3; WC)
- Felto Prewitt, Tulsa (AP-2; FN)
- Robert St. Onge, Army (AP-3)
- John T. Martin, Navy (UP-2)
- Gordon Appleby, Ohio State (UP-4)
- Gordon Berlin, Washington (CP-2)

=== Quarterbacks ===
- Les Horvath, Ohio State (College Football Hall of Fame) (AAB; AP-1; COL [fb]; FN; FWAA-1; INS-1; LK; NEA; SN; UP-1; CP-1; WC)
- Buddy Young, Illinois (College Football Hall of Fame) (AP-2; UP-2; INS-2; CP-2; LK)
- Doug Kenna, Army (College Football Hall of Fame) (UP-3; COL; CP-2)
- Jim Hardy, USC (UP-4; FWAA-2)
- Frank Broyles, Georgia Tech (FWAA-2)

=== Halfbacks ===
- Glenn Davis, Army (College Football Hall of Fame) (AAB; AP-1; FN; FWAA-1; INS-1; NEA; SN; UP-1; CP-1; WC)
- Creighton Miller, Notre Dame (College Football Hall of Fame) (CO-1; FN; INS-1; SN)
- Bob Odell, Penn (College Football Hall of Fame) (CO-1; INS-1; LK; NYS-1)
- Bob Jenkins, Navy (AAB; AP-2; COL; FWAA-2; INS-2; NEA; SN; UP-1; WC)
- Bob Fenimore, Oklahoma A&M (College Football Hall of Fame) (AP-1; COL; FN; FWAA-1; INS-2; NEA; UP-3; CP-2)
- Jug Girard, Wisconsin (LK)
- Bob Kelly, Notre Dame (AP-3; UP-2; INS-2)
- Shorty McWilliams, Mississippi State (AP-2; UP-2)
- Thomas Davis, Duke (AP-3; UP-4; CP-2)
- Harold Hamburg, Navy (AP-3; UP-3)
- Clyde Scott, Navy (College Football Hall of Fame) (UP-4)

=== Fullbacks ===
- Doc Blanchard, Army (College Football Hall of Fame) (AAB; AP-1; FN; FWAA-1; INS-1; LK; SN; UP-1; CP-1; WC)
- Babe Dimancheff, Purdue (AP-2; UP-2; FWAA-2; INS-1; CP-1)
- Bob Wiese, Michigan/Navy (UP-3)
- Gordon Gray, USC (AP-3; UP-4)

== Key ==
Bold = Consensus All-American

- -1 – First-team selection
- -2 – Second-team selection
- -3 – Third-team selection

=== Official selectors ===
- AAB = All-America Board
- AP = Associated Press
- COL = Collier's Weekly: "chosen by Grantland Rice and 10 veteran football writers from all sections of the country"
- FN = Football News
- INS = International News Service
- LK = Look magazine, selected by NBC sports reporter and commentator Bill Stern
- NEA = Newspaper Enterprise Association: "It still is the duty of every football writer, it seems, to pick an All-America team. Selecting one has become a futility that even a World War can't stop. So without further ado and with no apologies, here we go again."
- SN = Sporting News
- UP = United Press: "selected for the United Press ... by sports editors and writers from all over the country"

=== Other selectors ===
- CP = Central Press Association: "Mighty Army, Navy, and Ohio State dominated the 1944 Central Press Captains' All-American team, picked for the 14th straight season with the help of the nation's football captains. As in the past two years, service players are not included in the selections."
- FWAA = Football Writers Association of America
- WC = Walter Camp Football Foundation

== See also ==
- 1944 All-Big Six Conference football team
- 1944 All-Big Ten Conference football team
- 1944 All-Pacific Coast Conference football team
- 1944 All-SEC football team
