= Stan Kozlowski =

American football player (1924–1972)

No. 73
- Position: Fullback

Personal information
- Born: February 5, 1924; Rumford, Rhode Island, U.S.
- Died: August 23, 1972 (aged 48); Littleton, Massachusetts, U.S.
- Listed height: 6 ft 1 in (1.85 m)
- Listed weight: 200 lb (91 kg)

Career information
- High school: St. Raphael Academy (Pawtucket, Rhode Island)
- College: Notre Dame; Holy Cross
- NFL draft: 1946: 3rd round, 24th overall pick

Career history
- Miami Seahawks (1946)

Awards and highlights
- Third-team All-American (1945); First-team All-Eastern (1945); Second-team All-Eastern (1943)

Career AAFC statistics
- Rushing yards: 61
- Rushing average: 3.4
- Receptions: 2
- Receiving yards: 27
- Stats at Pro Football Reference

Stanley J. Kozlowski (February 25, 1924 – August 23, 1972) was an American football fullback in the All-America Football Conference (AAFC) for the Miami Seahawks. He played college football at the University of Notre Dame and the College of the Holy Cross and was drafted in the third round of the 1946 NFL draft by the Washington Redskins. In August 1972, he was walking across a street and was hit by a motorist. He died a few hours later at a hospital.
