= Barney Poole =

American football player (1923–2005)

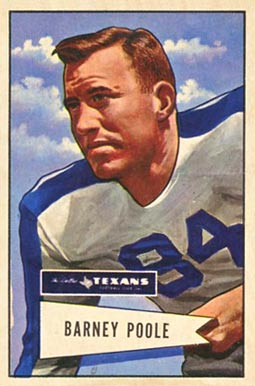
- Poole on a 1952 Bowman football card

No. 58, 84, 62, 83, 78
- Positions: Defensive end, end

Personal information
- Born: October 29, 1923; Gloster, Mississippi, U.S.
- Died: April 12, 2005 (aged 81); Jackson, Mississippi, U.S.
- Listed height: 6 ft 2 in (1.88 m)
- Listed weight: 231 lb (105 kg)

Career information
- High school: Crosby (MS)
- College: Ole Miss (1942, 1947-1948); North Carolina (1943); Army (1944-1946)
- NFL draft: 1945: 6th round, 53rd overall pick

Career history

Playing
- Brooklyn-New York Yankees (1949); New York Yanks (1950–1951); Dallas Texans (1952); Baltimore Colts (1953); New York Giants (1954)

Coaching
- LSU (1955) Assistant coach/Scout; Alabama (1956-1957) Assistant coach; Southern Miss (1965-1973) Assistant coach

Awards and highlights
- 2× National champion (1944, 1945); 3× First-team All-American (1944, 1947, 1948); Second-team All-American (1946); 2× First-team All-SEC (1947, 1948); First-team All-Eastern (1944); Second-team All-Eastern (1945)

Career NFL/AAFC statistics
- Receptions: 12
- Receiving yards: 188
- Receiving touchdowns: 1
- Stats at Pro Football Reference
- College Football Hall of Fame

George Barney Poole (October 29, 1923 – April 12, 2005) was an American professional football player who was an end in the National Football League (NFL) for the New York Yanks, Dallas Texans, Baltimore Colts, and New York Giants. Poole also played football in the All-America Football Conference (AAFC) for the New York Yankees. Poole played college football for the Ole Miss Rebels and Army Black Knights, earning All-American honors as an offensive and defensive end. He was inducted into the College Football Hall of Fame in 1974.

== Early life ==
Barney Poole was born and raised in Gloster, Mississippi. He attended Crosby High School where he played baseball, basketball, and football.

Poole came from a famous Mississippi football family. His older brothers Jim "Buster" Poole and Ray Poole both starred at Ole Miss and played for the New York Giants of the NFL before moving into the coaching ranks.

== College career ==
Poole began his college football career at Ole Miss in 1942, where both of his brothers had previously attended. Poole left Ole Miss in the midst of World War II to join the U.S. Marine Corps and was sent to the V-12 Navy College Training Program at the University of North Carolina Chapel Hill. He played football for North Carolina during the 1943 season, joined by his brother, Ray, and cousin Oliver Poole. In the final game of the season, Poole had two touchdown receptions and put up a strong defensive showing in North Carolina's 54-7 win over Virginia.

Wartime regulations towards college eligibility allowed for looser transfer rules in college football during this period. The military services academies took advantage of these rules to recruit star players to their teams, which included Barney Poole.

In 1944, Poole joined the United States Military Academy while in the U.S. Marine Corps Reserve and quickly became a key member of Army's powerhouse football team. Army went undefeated on the 1944 season, and Poole was named to the 1944 All-America First-team and 1944 All-Eastern First-team. Army were crowned consensus national champions of the 1944 season.

Poole and the Army Cadets built on their success in 1945, again going undefeated and earning the consensus national championship title. The 1945 Army Cadets were one of the most dominant college football teams of all time. In Army's 48-0 victory over #2 Notre Dame, Poole blocked a punt in the second quarter that helped spur on the route. Poole was named to the 1945 All-Eastern Second-team.

Poole remained at Army for the 1946 season. After winning their first seven games, Poole and top-ranked Army faced #2 Notre Dame at Yankee Stadium in New York City. In a defensive struggle, the game ended in a 0-0 tie, and became known as one of college football's Games of the Century. Poole and Army defeated Navy in that year's Army–Navy Game, and Poole was a key contributor on defense. Poole made two game-saving tackles near the endzone, securing Army's victory. Despite tying with Notre Dame, Army finished second in the 1946 AP poll. However, they were named national champions by several other selectors. Poole ended the season with as a 1946 All-America team honorable mention.

Following the 1946 season, Poole's football eligibility at Army ended. He first sought a leave of absence from the military to play professional football, but his request was denied. Prior to graduation, Poole left Army and re-joined Ole Miss where he had two remaining years of college football eligibility.

In 1947, Poole reunited with former Ole Miss teammate, quarterback Charlie Conerly, and formed a record-setting passing attack. Poole led the NCAA in receptions in 1947 with 52 catches, a then college football all-time, single season record. Poole and Ole Miss were 1947 SEC Champions and he was named to the 1947 All-America First-Team and 1947 All-SEC First-team. Ole Miss defeated TCU in the inaugural Delta Bowl, 13-9, to finish the season.

In his last year of college eligibility, Poole helped lead Ole Miss to an 8-1 record. Despite only losing once, Ole Miss finished second in the SEC, behind Georgia. Poole was again named to both the 1948 All-America First-Team and 1948 All-SEC First-team. Poole finished his Ole Miss career with 70 receptions for 764 yards and 11 touchdowns.

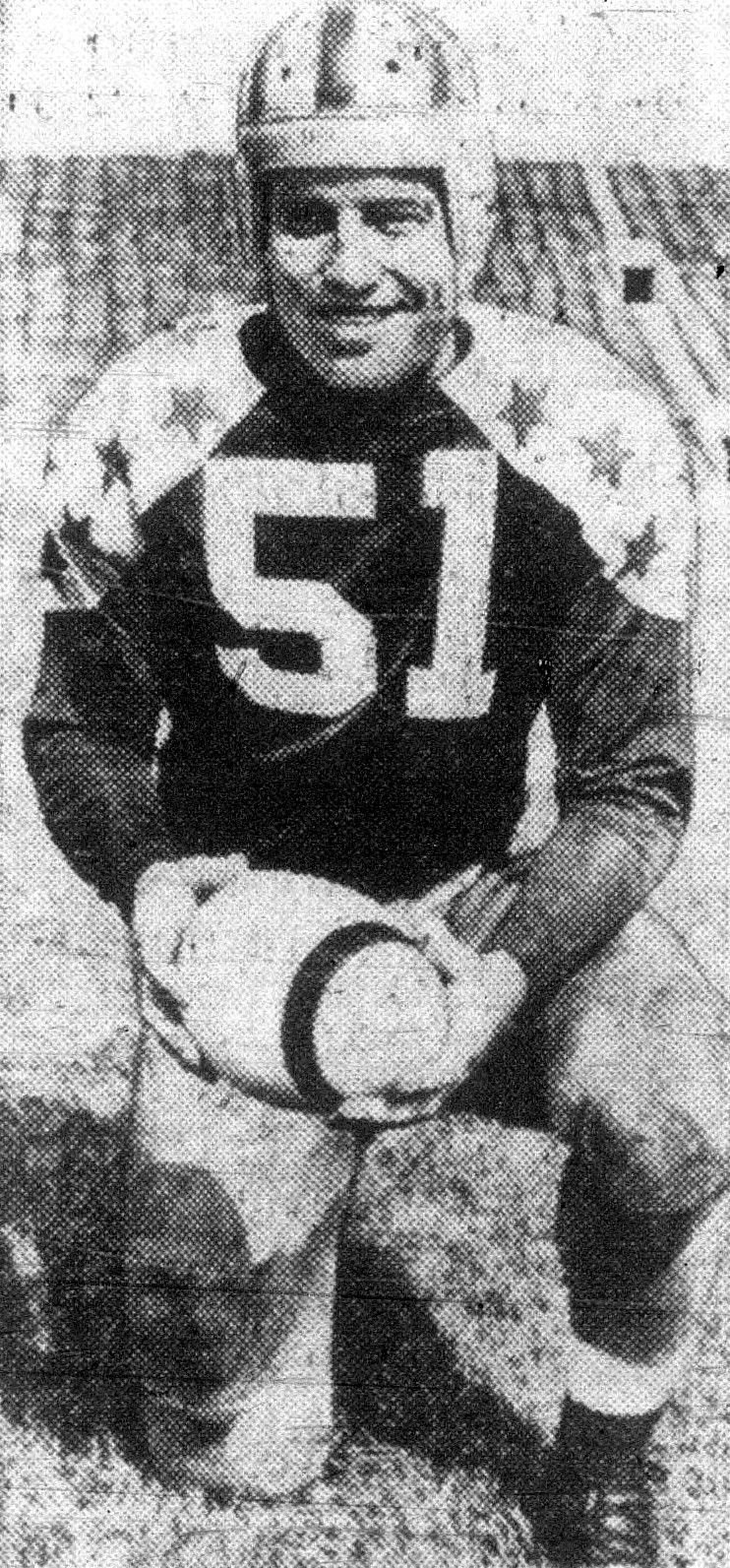
Barney Poole with the College All-Stars, 1949

Poole participated in the 1948 Blue–Gray Football Classic and in August 1949 served as a captain of the college all-star team that faced the Philadelphia Eagles in the Chicago Tribune Charities football game.

Poole was inducted into the College Football Hall of Fame in 1974.

== Professional career ==
Poole was originally drafted by the New York Giants in the sixth round of the National Football League in the 1945 NFL draft. Many collegiate football stars were drafted that year, as NFL teams sought to secure players whose draft rights were affected by military service. When Poole debated his professional football career prior to the 1947 season, the Giants retained his NFL player rights.

After exhausting his college eligibility following the 1948 college football season, Poole passed up a chance to play with his brothers on the Giants. Instead, he signed a three-year, $40,000 contract with the Brooklyn-New York Yankees of the upstart All-American Football Conference (AAFC), who had drafted him in the 1948 AAFC draft.

Poole began his professional career with the Yankees as a defensive end, before a short stint as an offensive end during his rookie season. Poole and the Yankees only lasted one season, finishing 8-4. The AAFC merged with the NFL following the 1949 season, and although some teams joined the new league, the Yankees folded and ceased operations.

Poole was sent to the NFL's New York Yanks (formerly the New York Bulldogs), where he spent the 1950 and 1951 NFL seasons. Poole continued to play both offensive and defensive end, while focusing more on defense. Poor play and attendance led the Yanks to fold following the 1951 season.

The Yank's assets and players were sent to the expansion Dallas Texans. Poole joined the Texans for their lone season in Dallas. The Texan's fate ended in dissolution, as the team's owners abandoned the team midway through the 1952 season. The assets and players of the Texans were sent to the newly-formed Baltimore Colts.

Poole spent the 1953 season in Baltimore, where he served as a veteran presence on the new expansion team. In the Colts' opening game against the Chicago Bears, Poole recovered two fumbles and had several tackles for loss in Baltimore's 13-9 victory over the more established Chicago team. Teammate and future Pro Football Hall of Fame inductee Art Donovan encapsulated Poole's hardnosed attitude in his 1987 autobiography, Fatso: Football When Men Were Really Men:

Early in my career—the Colts' first year back in Baltimore, as a matter of fact—I played with a defensive lineman named Barney Poole. He was a tough guy, but by 1953 he was pretty much over the hill. And he was doing anything he could to hang on. In one game he tore up his hand. He caught his fingers in someone's face mask and it nearly yanked a couple of the digits out. That hand was a mess. This happened sometime early in the second quarter, and Barney was led off the field and into the locker room and soon thereafter an ambulance carried him off to Union Memorial. He got his fingers stitched up. I swear to God, he got out on Thirty-third Street and hitchhiked right back up to Memorial Stadium. Damned if he didn't return in time to play the fourth quarter. And he did play, too, with a big wrapping on those twisted and mangled fingers.

— Art Donovan, Fatso: Football When Men Were Really Men, 1987, pp. 158-159

Poole was traded by the Colts to the New York Giants prior to the 1954 season, the team that had originally drafted him in 1945. For the second time in his career, Poole was reunited with quarterback Charlie Conerly. Poole spent one season with the Giants. Poole planned to play another season for the Giants, but a shoulder injury caused his early retirement.

== Coaching career ==
Poole joined the LSU football coaching staff in October 1955, hired as a scout and recruiter. He spent one season with LSU. In January 1956, Poole was hired as an assistant defensive coach with Alabama under head coach J.B. Whitworth. Poole stayed at Alabama for two seasons.

Poole moved back to Mississippi and began coaching high school football, taking Laurel High School to the Mississippi state championship in 1961.

After the 1965 season, Poole returned to college football as an assistant coach at Southern Mississippi, working with College Football Hall of Fame head coach Thad Vann and later for P. W. Underwood. Poole coached at Southern Miss for eight seasons, retiring after the 1973 season.

== Personal life ==
While playing professional football, Poole returned to Mississippi during the offseason where he owned a cattle farm. Poole and his wife, Martha, had two daughters.

In 1974, Poole became stadium manager of the Mississippi Veterans Memorial Stadium in Jackson, Mississippi. He led operations of the stadium until 1990, when he retired to his hometown of Gloster, Mississippi.

Poole was inducted into the Mississippi Sports Hall of Fame in 1965 and the Ole Miss Athletics Hall of Fame in 1987.

Poole died of pneumonia on April 12, 2005, aged 81.

== See also ==
- List of NCAA major college football yearly receiving leaders
