= Tex Coulter =

American gridiron football player (1924–2007)

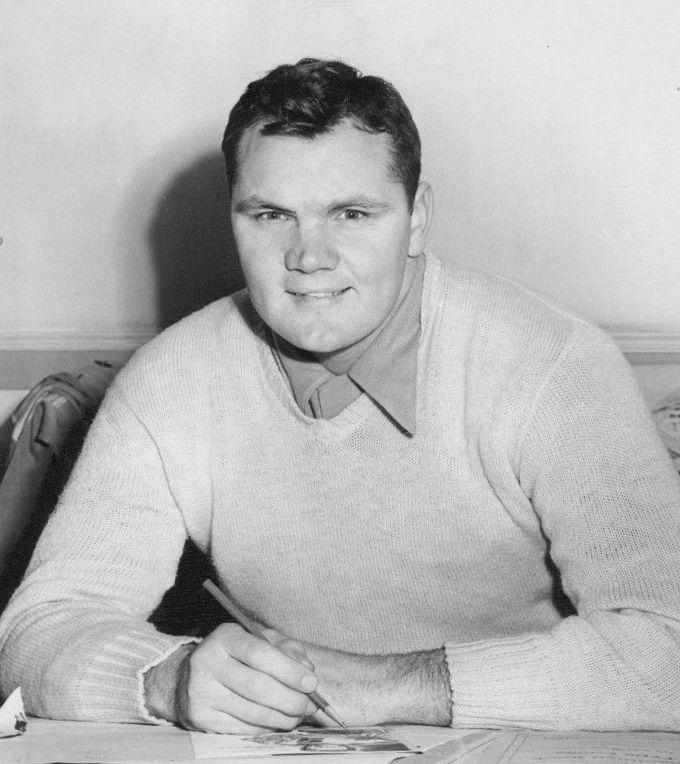
- Coulter c. 1949

No. 79, 60
- Positions: Tackle, center, end

Personal information
- Born: October 26, 1924; Fort Worth, Texas, U.S.
- Died: October 2, 2007 (aged 82); Austin, Texas, U.S.
- Listed height: 6 ft 4 in (1.93 m)
- Listed weight: 250 lb (113 kg)

Career information
- College: Texas A&M; Cornell; Army (1944-1945)
- NFL draft: 1947: 1st round, 7th overall pick

Career history
- New York Giants (1946–1952); Montreal Alouettes (1953–1956)

Awards and highlights
- Second-team All-Pro (1951); 2× Pro Bowl (1951, 1952); 3× IRFU All Star (1953, 1954, 1955); Most Outstanding Lineman Award (1955); 2× National champion (1944, 1945); Consensus All-American (1945); Second-team All-American (1944); First-team All-Eastern (1945)

Career NFL statistics
- Receptions: 9
- Receiving yards: 116
- Touchdowns: 1
- Stats at Pro Football Reference

DeWitt Echoles "Tex" Coulter (October 26, 1924 – October 2, 2007) was an American professional football player in the National Football League (NFL) for the New York Giants and in the Interprovincial Rugby Football Union for the Montreal Alouettes. Coulter attended the United States Military Academy, where he played football and competed in the shot put.

New York Giants lineman Tex Coulter at the end of the leather helmet era, 1947.
