= Dick Ottele =

American football player (1926–1985)

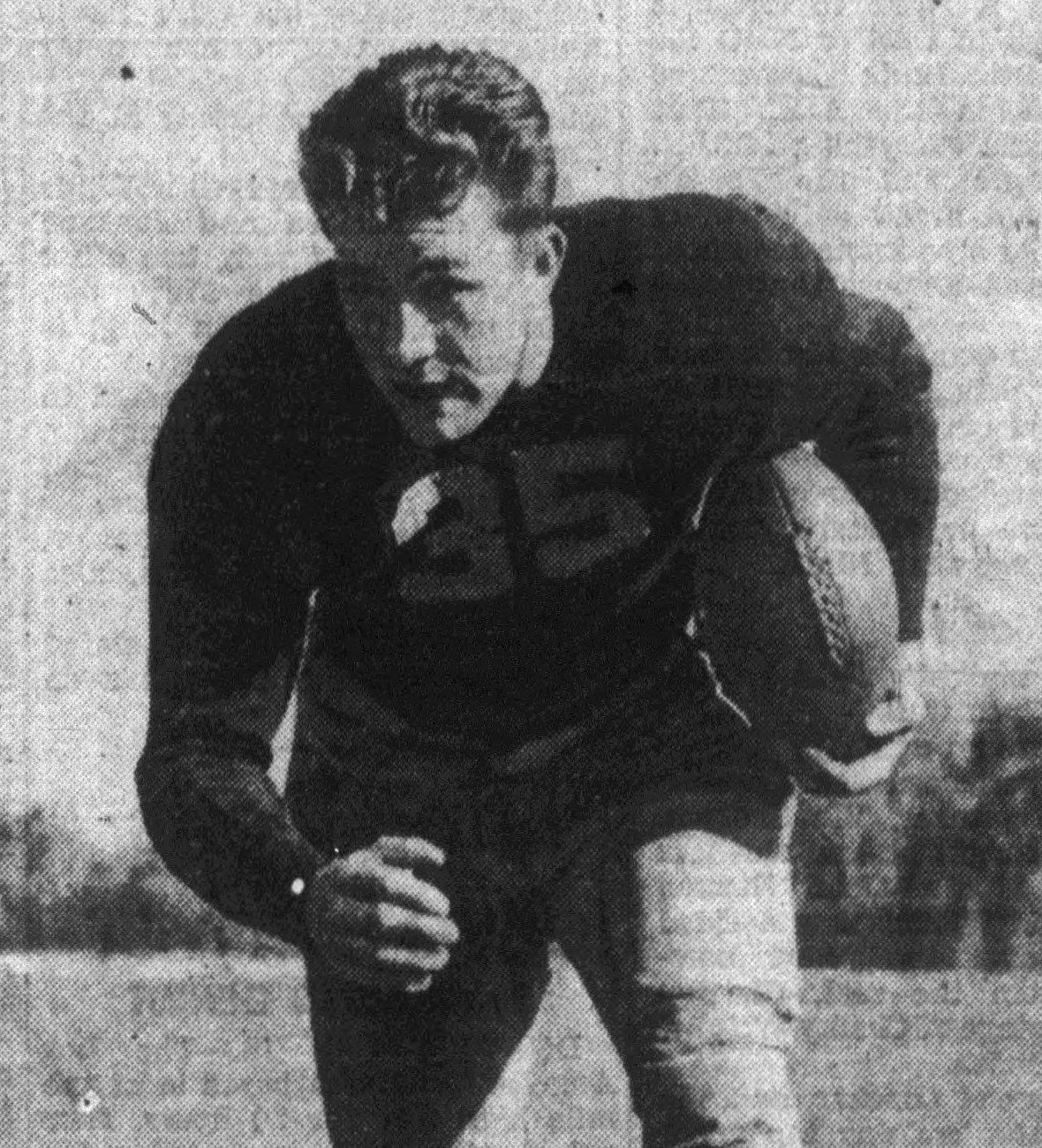
- Ottele, circa 1946

No. 65
- Position: Back

Personal information
- Born: December 8, 1926; Yuma, Colorado, U.S.
- Died: September 20, 1985 (aged 58); Bremerton, Washington, U.S.
- Listed height: 6 ft 3 in (1.91 m)
- Listed weight: 210 lb (95 kg)

Career information
- High school: Woodrow Wilson Classical (CA)
- College: Washington (1944, 1946-1947)
- NFL draft: 1948: 9th round, 66th overall pick

Career history
- Los Angeles Dons (1948)

Awards and highlights
- Second-team All-PCC (1944)

Career AAFC statistics
- Rushing yards: 11
- Rushing average: 5.5
- Return yards: 47
- Stats at Pro Football Reference

Richard George Ottele (December 8, 1926 – September 20, 1985) was an American football player who played at the blocking back and defensive back positions. He played college football for Washington and professional football for the Los Angeles Dons.

== Early life ==
Ottele was born in 1926 in Yuma, Colorado. He attended and played football at Woodrow Wilson Classical High School in Long Beach, California.

== Military and college football ==
He played college football for Washington in 1944, 1945, and 1947. He also served in the United States Navy.

== Professional football ==
He was selected by the New York Giants in the ninth round (66th overall pick) of the 1948 NFL draft and by the New York Yankees in the 13th round (80th overall pick) of the 1948 AAFC Draft.

He was the subject of controversy when it was disclosed prior to his senior season at Washington that he had secretly signed a contract to play professional football for the New York Yankees of the All-America Football Conference. The Yankees sold him to the Los Angeles Dons in May 1948.

He played in the All-America Football Conference (AAFC) for the Los Angeles Dons during their 1948 season, appearing in nine games. In June 1949, the Dons sold Ottele to the Chicago Hornets.

== Later life ==
He died in 1985 in Bremerton, Washington at age 58.
