= Jordan Mounds =

Archaeological site in Louisiana, US

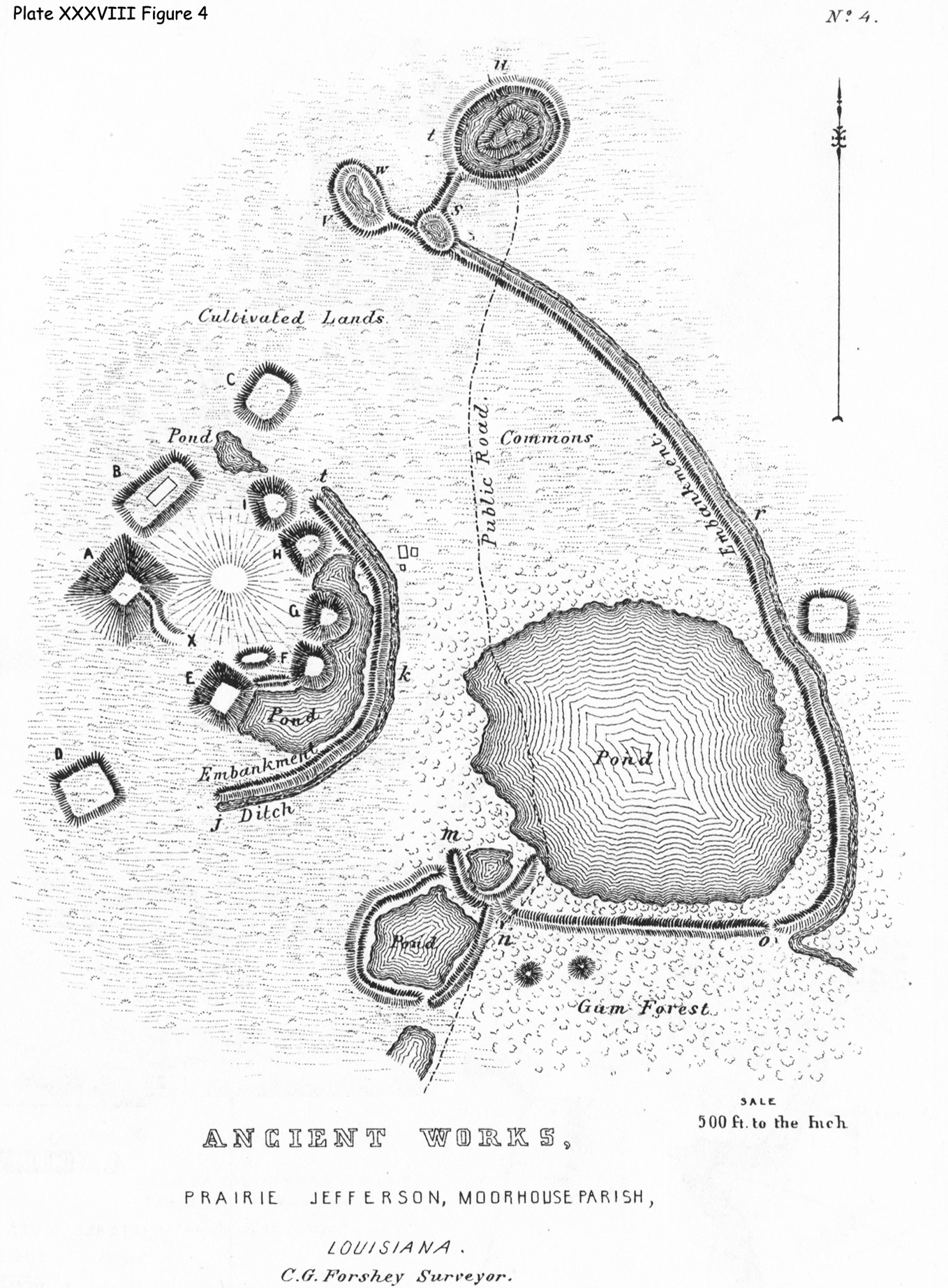
- Squier and Davis Plate XXXVIII Figure 4

- Location within Louisiana today
- 32°38′38.65″N 91°45′34.92″W
- Location: Oak Ridge, Louisiana, Morehouse Parish, Louisiana, US
- Region: Morehouse Parish, Louisiana

Site notes
- Archaeologists: Tristam R. Kidder

Jordan Mounds (16 MO 1) is a multimound archaeological site in Morehouse Parish, Louisiana. It is the type site for the Jordan Phase of the local chronology. The site was constructed during the protohistoric period between 1540 and 1685.

== Description ==
The site was once an impressive mound complex, with seven platform mounds surrounding a central plaza and an associated village area. It was once located on the Arkansas River, which has a relict channel nearby. The site was constructed during the protohistoric period (1540 to 1685) after Native Americans in the area were first contacted by Europeans of the Hernando de Soto Expedition of the early 1540s. The builders were an intrusive group in the area, possibly from the Mississippi River area to the east. By the late 1600s the site was abandoned, possibly due to the collapse of their society brought about by the aftereffects of European contact. The site is depicted in E. G. Squier and E. H. Davis' Ancient Monuments of the Mississippi Valley in 1848 as Plate XXXVIII Figure 4. In the early 1840s the site was purchased by Dr. Thomas P. Harrison and A.T. Hawkins Duvall. Clarence Bloomfield Moore tried to visit the site in the early 1900s but was unable to do so because the site lacked riverine access for his steamboat the Gopher.

In 1985 the Lower Mississippi Survey was conducted by archaeologists from the Peabody Museum of Archaeology and Ethnology in the Central Boeuf Basin that showed that two of the original seven mounds had been lost to agriculture. As the study stated "that the landowner would see the Jordan site destroyed before he allowed the state, or any other governmental body, to infringe on his sovereignty."

== See also ==
- Venable Mound: also in Morehouse Parish
- Culture, phase, and chronological table for the Mississippi Valley
