= Albin Collins =

American football player (1927–2006)

Albin "Rip" Collins
No. 71, 88, 65
- Positions: Halfback, punter

Personal information
- Born: September 27, 1927; Baton Rouge, Louisiana, U.S.
- Died: April 9, 2006 (aged 78); Houston, Texas, U.S.
- Listed height: 6 ft 0 in (1.83 m)
- Listed weight: 190 lb (86 kg)

Career information
- High school: Baton Rouge
- College: LSU (1945–1948)
- NFL draft: 1949: 6th round, 53rd overall pick

Career history
- Chicago Hornets (1949); Baltimore Colts (1950); Green Bay Packers (1951)

Awards and highlights
- First-team All-SEC (1947)

Career NFL/AAFC statistics
- Rushing yards: 193
- Rushing average: 1.9
- Receptions: 26
- Receiving yards: 461
- Punts: 45
- Punt yards: 1,897
- Stats at Pro Football Reference

Albin Harrell "Rip" Collins (September 27, 1927 – April 9, 2006) was an American professional football player who was a halfback and punter in the All-America Football Conference (AAFC) and the National Football League (NFL). Collins played college football for the LSU Tigers and was selected by the New York Bulldogs in the sixth round of the 1949 NFL draft. Collins played for the Chicago Hornets (AAFC) (1949), Baltimore Colts (NFL) (1950), and the Green Bay Packers (NFL) (1951).
