= Ben Chase =

American football player (1923–1998)

No. 44
- Position: Guard

Personal information
- Born: March 18, 1923; Bisbee, Arizona, U.S.
- Died: March 6, 1998 (aged 74); Poway, California, U.S.
- Listed height: 6 ft 3 in (1.91 m)
- Listed weight: 235 lb (107 kg)

Career information
- High school: Hoover (San Diego, California)
- College: Navy (1942–1944)

Career history
- Los Angeles Rams (1947)*; Detroit Lions (1947)
- * Offseason or practice squad member only

Awards and highlights
- Consensus All-American (1944); Second-team All-Eastern (1944)
- Stats at Pro Football Reference

Benjamin Semple Chase III (March 18, 1923 – March 6, 1998) was an American professional football guard who played one season with the Detroit Lions of the National Football League (NFL). He played college football at the United States Naval Academy.

== Early life ==
Benjamin Semple Chase III was born on March 18, 1923, in Bisbee, Arizona. He attended Herbert Hoover High School in San Diego, California.

== College career ==
Chase played college football for the Navy Midshipmen of the United States Naval Academy and was a three-year letterman from 1942 to 1944. He was a consensus All-American in 1944. Despite this, he was only named second-team All-Eastern by the Associated Press in 1944. He served in the United States Navy after his college career. He played for the 1945 Little Creek Amphibs football team.

== Professional career ==
Chase signed with the Los Angeles Rams of the National Football League in 1947 but was later waived.

He was claimed off waivers by the Detroit Lions on September 24, 1947. He played in 11 games for the Lions during the 1947 season, recording two fumble recoveries.

== Personal life ==
Chase died on March 6, 1998, in Poway, California.
