= Felto Prewitt =

American football player (1924–1998)

Felton Prewitt
- Prewitt with Tulsa, 1945

No. 21, 20
- Position: Center

Personal information
- Born: May 17, 1924; Corsicana, Texas, U.S.
- Died: March 15, 1998 (aged 73); Reno, Nevada, U.S.
- Listed height: 5 ft 11 in (1.80 m)
- Listed weight: 207 lb (94 kg)

Career information
- College: Tulsa (1943–1945)
- NFL draft: 1946: 6th round, 48th overall pick

Career history
- Buffalo Bisons (1946–1948); Baltimore Colts (1949)

Awards and highlights
- First-team All-American (1944); Tulsa Golden Hurricane Jersey No. 36 retired

Career AAFC statistics
- Games played: 46
- Games started: 30
- Interceptions: 6
- Stats at Pro Football Reference

Felton Winters "Pluto" Prewitt (May 17, 1924 – March 15, 1998) was an American football center.

Prewitt was born in Corsicana, Texas, and attended Corsicana High School. He played college football at center for the Tulsa Golden Hurricane from 1943 to 1945, including the 1944 team that defeated Georgia Tech in the 1945 Orange Bowl.

Prewitt was drafted by the Philadelphia Eagles in the fifth round (34th overall pick) of the 1943 NFL draft, but did not play for the Eagles. Instead, he signed a contract in June 1946 to play professional football in the All-America Football Conference (AAFC) for the Buffalo Bisons. He played for the Bisons from 1946 to 1948 and for the Baltimore Colts in 1949. He appeared in 46 games, 30 as a starter.

Prewitt died in 1998 in Reno, Nevada.
