= Wash Serini =

American football player (1922–1994)

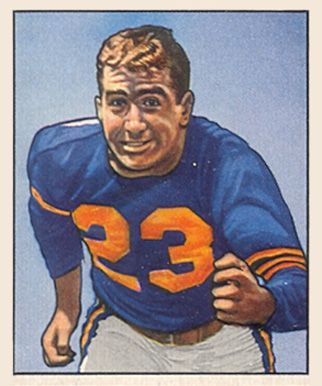

No. 23, 73
- Positions: Guard, tackle

Personal information
- Born: March 11, 1922; Tuckahoe, New York, U.S.
- Died: June 21, 1994 (aged 72); Highland, New York, U.S.
- Listed height: 6 ft 2 in (1.88 m)
- Listed weight: 236 lb (107 kg)

Career information
- High school: Eastchester (Eastchester, New York)
- College: Kentucky
- NFL draft: 1948: undrafted

Career history
- Chicago Bears (1948–1951); Green Bay Packers (1952)

Awards and highlights
- Pro Football Illustrated 2nd Team All-NFL (1948); INS 1st Team All-NFL/AAFC (1949); First-team All-SEC (1944); 2× Second-team All-SEC (1945, 1947)

Career NFL statistics
- Games played: 59
- Games started: 16
- Fumble recoveries: 4
- Stats at Pro Football Reference

William Washington Serini (March 11, 1922 – June 21, 1994) was a guard in the National Football League (NFL). He played four seasons with the Chicago Bears before playing his final season with the Green Bay Packers.
