= 1944 All-SEC football team =

American college football all-star team

The 1944 All-SEC football team consists of American football players selected to the All-Southeastern Conference (SEC) chosen by various selectors for the 1944 college football season. Georgia Tech won the conference.

== All-SEC selections ==
=== Ends ===
- Phil Tinsley, Georgia Tech (AP-1, UP-1)
- Ray Olson, Tulane (AP-1)
- Dewell Rushing, Florida (UP-1)
- Ralph Jones, Alabama (AP-2)
- Reid Moseley, Georgia (AP-2)
- Charley Webb, LSU (UP-2)
- Don Ray Wells, Georgia (UP-2)
- Bill Hildebrand, Miss. St. (AP-3)
- Bob McCain, Ole Miss (AP-3)

=== Tackles ===
- Wash Serini, Kentucky (AP-1, UP-1)
- Hillery Horne, Miss. St. (AP-1)
- John Wozniak, Alabama (UP-1)
- Dub Garrett, Miss. St. (AP-2, UP-2)
- Andy Perbach, Georgia (AP-2)
- Jim Little, Kentucky (UP-2)
- Tom Whitley, Alabama (AP-3)
- Mike Castronis, Georgia (AP-3)

=== Guards ===
- Bob Dobelstein, Tennessee (AP-1, UP-1)
- Herbert St. John, Georgia (AP-1)
- Felix Trapani, LSU (UP-1)
- Maurice Furchgott, Georgia Tech (AP-2)
- Gaston Bourgeois, Tulane (AP-2, UP-2)
- Arnette, Ole Miss (UP-2)

=== Centers ===
- Tex Warrington, Auburn (AP-1, UP-1)
- Vaughn Mancha, Alabama (AP-2, UP-2)
- Russ Morgan, Tennessee (AP-2)

=== Quarterbacks ===
- Shorty McWilliams, Miss. St. (AP-1, UP-1)
- Harry Gilmer, Alabama (College Football Hall of Fame) (AP-2, UP-1)
- Dinky Bowen, Georgia Tech (AP-2, UP-2)

=== Halfbacks ===
- Dub Jones, Tulane (AP-1, UP-1)
- Buster Stephens, Tennessee (AP-1, UP-2)
- Curtis Kuykendall, Auburn (UP-2)
- James Rutland, Georgia (UP-2)
- Norman Klein, Kentucky (AP-3)
- Bobby Forbes, Florida (AP-3)
- George Mathews, Georgia Tech (AP-3)

=== Fullbacks ===
- Frank Broyles, Georgia Tech (AP-1, UP-1 [as hb])
- Billy Bevis, Tennessee (AP-2)

== Key ==
AP = Associated Press.

UP = United Press

Bold = Consensus first-team selection by both AP and UP

== See also ==
- 1944 College Football All-America Team
