= Paul Walker (American football) =

American football player (1925–1972)

No. 86
- Positions: End, defensive back

Personal information
- Born: July 9, 1925; Springfield, Missouri, U.S.
- Died: October 20, 1972 (aged 47); West Hartford, Connecticut, U.S.
- Listed height: 6 ft 3 in (1.91 m)
- Listed weight: 210 lb (95 kg)

Career information
- High school: Oak Park and River Forest (Oak Park, Illinois)
- College: Yale
- NFL draft: 1945: 10th round, 95th overall pick

Career history
- New York Giants (1948)

Awards and highlights
- Consensus All-American (1944); All-American (1945); First-team All-Eastern (1943); Second-team All-Eastern (1944)

Career NFL statistics
- Receptions: 1
- Receiving yards: 11
- Interceptions: 1
- Stats at Pro Football Reference

Paul Frederick Walker (July 9, 1925 – October 20, 1972) was an American professional football player who played one season for the New York Giants of the National Football League (NFL). He played college football at Yale, where he was a consensus All-American.

== Early life ==
Paul Frederick Walker was born on July 9, 1925, in Springfield, Missouri. He attended Oak Park and River Forest High School in Oak Park, Illinois.

== College career ==
Walker attended Yale College, where he lettered for the Yale Bulldogs football team from 1943 to 1945. In 1943, he was named third-team All-Eastern by the Associated Press (AP) and first-team All-Eastern by the United Press. He earned AP second-team All-Eastern honors in 1944. Walker was a consensus selection to the 1944 College Football All-America Team. His senior year in 1945, he was named a third-team All-American by the Central Press Association and a first-team All-American by Navy Log. He served as team captain of the 1945 Bulldogs.

== Professional career ==
Walker was selected by the Detroit Lions in the tenth round, with the 95th overall pick, of the 1945 NFL draft. However, he did not sign with the Lions.

Walker signed with the New York Giants on July 14, 1948. He played in all 12 games, starting 11, for the Giants during the 1948 season, recording one interception and one reception for 11 yards. He became a free agent after the season.

== Personal life ==
Walker died on October 20, 1972, in West Hartford, Connecticut.
