= Bill Hachten =

American football player (1924–2018)

No. 66
- Position: Guard

Personal information
- Born: November 30, 1924; Wichita, Kansas, U.S.
- Died: May 15, 2018 (aged 93); Madison, Wisconsin, U.S.
- Listed height: 6 ft 0 in (1.83 m)
- Listed weight: 210 lb (95 kg)

Career information
- High school: Huntington Park (CA)
- College: California; Stanford
- NFL draft: 1947: 13th round, 114th overall pick

Career history
- New York Giants (1947)

Awards and highlights
- First-team All-American (1944); 2× First-team All-PCC (1944, 1946)

Career NFL statistics
- Games played: 8
- Games started: 1
- Fumble recoveries: 1
- Stats at Pro Football Reference

William Andrews Hachten (November 30, 1924 – May 15, 2018) was an American professional football guard who played for the New York Giants. He played college football at Stanford University, having previously attended Huntington Park High School in Huntington Park, California. He was a World War II veteran. He died in May 2018 at the age of 93.
