= Joe Stanowicz =

American football player (1921–1999)

Profile
- Position: Guard

Personal information
- Born: November 4, 1921; Hackettstown, New Jersey, U.S.
- Died: September 21, 1999 (aged 77); Orange, California, U.S.

Career information
- College: United States Military Academy

Career history
- 1944: Army

Awards and highlights
- First-team All-American (1944); Second-team All-Eastern (1944)

Joseph John Stanowicz (November 4, 1921 – September 21, 1999) was an American football player. He attended the United States Military Academy where he played at the guard position for the Army Black Knights football team. He was selected by the Football Writers Association of America (FWAA), the International News Service (INS), and the United Press (UP) as a first-team player on the 1944 College Football All-America Team. After graduating from the academy, Stanowicz served in the Army until 1966. He died in 1999 in Orange, California.

A native of Hackettstown, New Jersey, Stanowicz played high school football at Blair Academy.
