= Al Dekdebrun =

American gridiron football player and politician (1921–2005)

No. 60, 66, 88, 86, 6, 91
- Position: Quarterback

Personal information
- Born: May 11, 1921; Buffalo, New York, U.S.
- Died: March 29, 2005 (aged 83); Cape Coral, Florida, U.S.
- Listed height: 5 ft 11 in (1.80 m)
- Listed weight: 185 lb (84 kg)

Career information
- High school: Burgard (Buffalo)
- College: Columbia; Cornell (1942-1945)
- NFL draft: 1946: 9th round, 72nd overall pick

Career history
- Buffalo Bisons (1946); Chicago Rockets (1947); Boston Yanks (1948); New York Yankees (1948); Toronto Argonauts (1950–1951); Brantford Redskins (1952); Montreal Alouettes (1953); Ottawa Rough Riders (1954)

Awards and highlights
- Grey Cup champion (1950); CFL All Star (1950); NCAA passing yards leader (1945); 2× Second-team All-Eastern (1944, 1945)

Career NFL/AAFC statistics
- Passing attempts: 170
- Passing completions: 87
- Completion percentage: 51.2%
- TD–INT: 14–19
- Passing yards: 1,294
- Passer rating: 64.3
- Stats at Pro Football Reference

Allen Edward Dekdebrun (May 11, 1921 – March 29, 2005) was an American football quarterback and politician from Buffalo, New York. As a professional football player, Dekdebrun was a career journeyman, playing in the All-America Football Conference (AAFC), National Football League (NFL), Interprovincial Rugby Football Union (IRFU), and Ontario Rugby Football Union (ORFU), changing teams on an annual basis. He played college football at Cornell University, where he was also a member of the Quill and Dagger society, and high school football at Burgard High School in Buffalo. He attended Columbia for his freshman year before transferring to Cornell.

In the 1950 Grey Cup, deemed the Mud Bowl, he scored the only touchdown for the winning Toronto Argonauts.

After his football career ended, Dekdebrun opened a sporting goods store in Buffalo, and also served as the town supervisor of Amherst, New York. He sought the office of Erie County executive in 1975, but lost to incumbent Edward Regan.

== See also ==
- List of NCAA major college yearly punt and kickoff return leaders
- List of NCAA major college football yearly passing leaders
