= Oak Ridge, Louisiana =

- Village
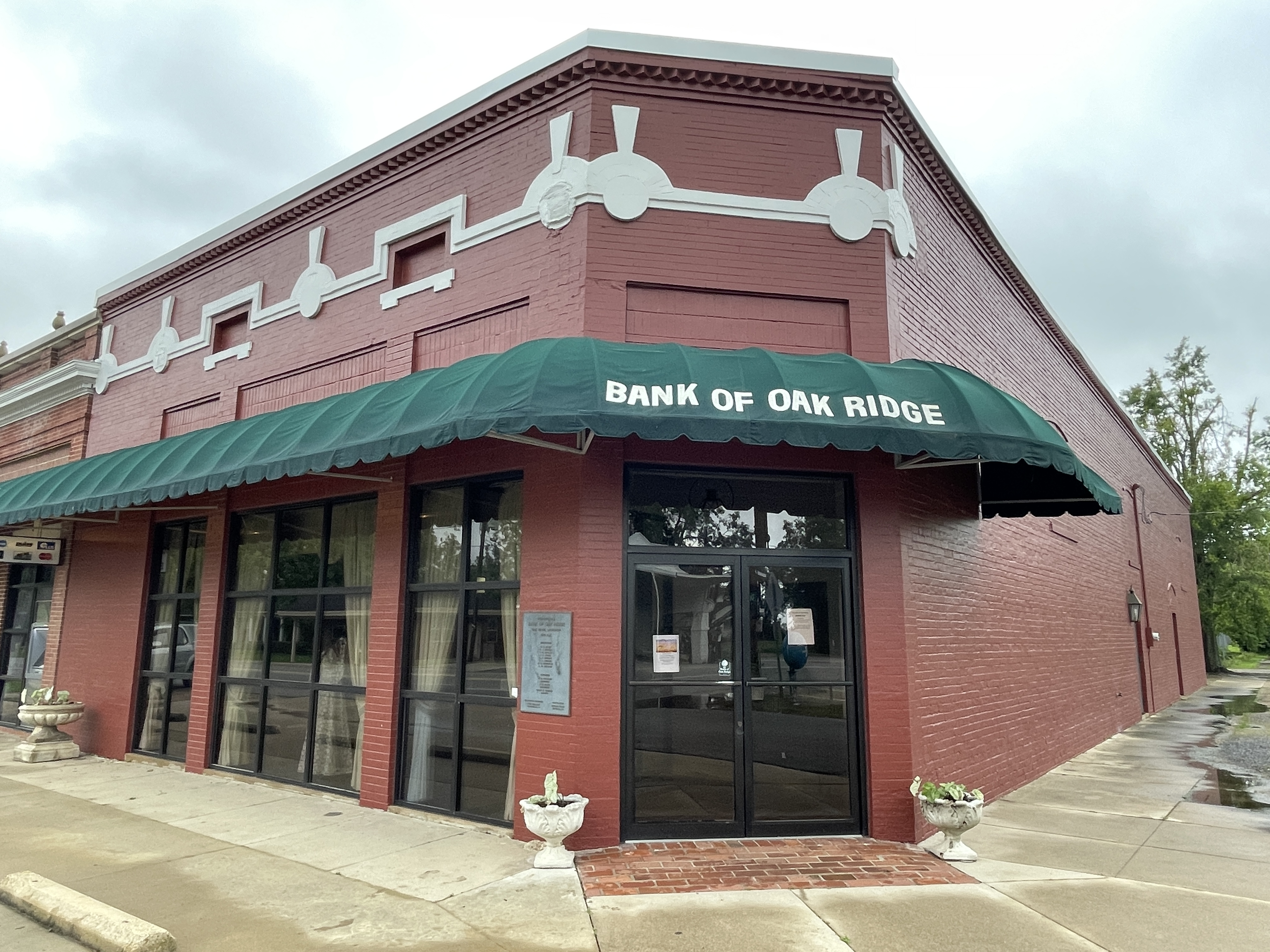
- Bank of Oak Ridge building

- Location in Morehouse Parish, Louisiana

- Location of Louisiana in the United States
- Coordinates: 32°37′34″N 91°46′23″W
- Country: United States
- State: Louisiana
- Parish: Morehouse

Area
  - Total: 0.99 sq mi (2.57 km^{2})
  - Land: 0.99 sq mi (2.57 km^{2})
  - Water: 0 sq mi (0.00 km^{2})
- Elevation: 89 ft (27 m)

Population (2020)
  - Total: 124
  - Density: 124.8/sq mi (48.17/km^{2})
- Time zone: UTC-6 (CST)
  - Summer (DST): UTC-5 (CDT)
- Area code: 318
- FIPS code: 22-57205
- GNIS feature ID: 2407515

Oak Ridge is a village in Morehouse Parish, Louisiana, United States. The population was 124 at the 2020 census.

== History ==
The earliest inhabitants of the area were different Native American cultures prior to European contact. Between 1540 and 1685 a multimound site with an adjoining central plaza was built. Since its archeological rediscovery c. 1848, the area has come to be known as the Jordan Mounds. It is believed that by 1700 the site was abandoned.

Morehouse Parish was formed in 1844 after the result of an increasing population in the area. It is thought that a small farming community was formed near Oak Ridge's modern location around this time. Cedars Plantation located at 4987 Lake Irwin Rd is considered the oldest surviving structure not just in the town, but the whole parish, built in 1840. It was added to the National Register of Historic Places on May 19, 1976. The propoerty has been largely abandoned since 2008. The village was originally called Prairie Jefferson due to the earliest settlers arriving from Jefferson County, Mississippi.

One surviving relic is a small wooden jail that is estimated to have been built in 1850. Simply known as the "Oak Ridge, Louisiana Jail", it is believed to be the last surviving pre-Civil War wooden jail in the state. The existence of this jail hints at the fact that Oak Ridge may have served an administrative purpose for the parish at the time. It is written that "the parish sheriff would use this jail to lock up free and enslaved men." The jail was eventually donated and now sits at the Louisiana State University - Rural Life Museum in Baton Rouge.

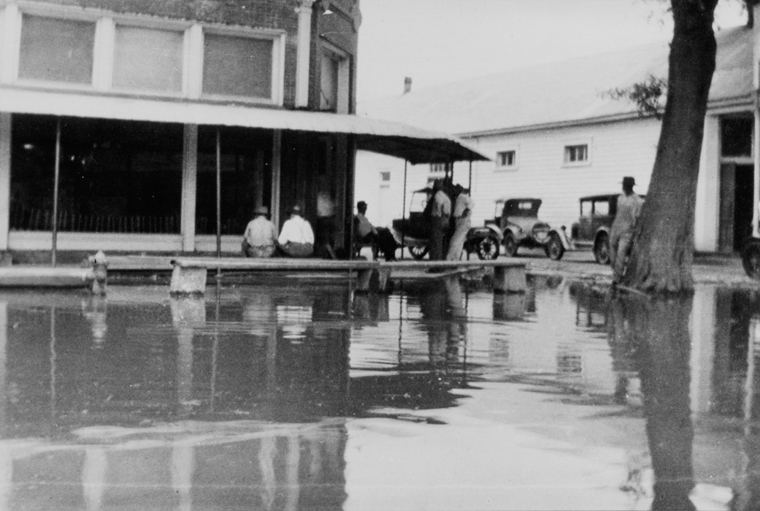
The Bank of Oak Ridge seen during the flood.

Oak Ridge was incorporated as a village in 1882.

The Great Mississippi Flood of 1927 affected Oak Ridge much as it did the other states and towns within the Mississippi River Basin.

== Geography ==
Oak Ridge is located in southern Morehouse Parish. U.S. Route 425 passes through the village, leading north and west 16 miles (26 km) to Bastrop, the parish seat, and south 10 miles (16 km) to Rayville.

According to the U.S. Census Bureau, the village has a total area of 0.99 square miles (2.56 km^{2}), all land.

The Jordan Mounds are located one mile north of the village.

== Demographics ==
Historical population
Census	Pop.	Note	%±
1890	296		—
1900	348		17.6%
1910	332		−4.6%
1920	318		−4.2%
1930	260		−18.2%
1940	373		43.5%
1950	287		−23.1%
1960	287		0.0%
1970	276		−3.8%
1980	257		−6.9%
1990	174		−32.3%
2000	142		−18.4%
2010	144		1.4%
2020	124		−13.9%
2025 (est.)	113	▼	−8.9%
U.S. Decennial Census

As of the census of 2000, there were 142 people, 63 households, and 38 families residing in the village. The population density was 143.2 inhabitants per square mile (55.3/km^{2}). There were 72 housing units at an average density of 72.6 per square mile (28.0/km^{2}). The racial makeup of the village was 91.55% White, 7.75% African American, and 0.70% from two or more races.

There were 63 households, out of which 28.6% had children under the age of 18 living with them, 57.1% were married couples living together, 4.8% had a female householder with no husband present, and 38.1% were non-families. 34.9% of all households were made up of individuals, and 25.4% had someone living alone who was 65 years of age or older. The average household size was 2.25 and the average family size was 2.95.

In the village, the population was spread out, with 24.6% under the age of 18, 4.2% from 18 to 24, 26.1% from 25 to 44, 23.2% from 45 to 64, and 21.8% who were 65 years of age or older. The median age was 41 years. For every 100 females, there were 89.3 males. For every 100 females age 18 and over, there were 78.3 males.

The median income for a household in the village was $37,500, and the median income for a family was $70,417. Males had a median income of $75,287 versus $24,583 for females. The per capita income for the village was $25,408. There were 9.8% of families and 17.5% of the population living below the poverty line, including 17.5% of under eighteens and 33.3% of those over 64.

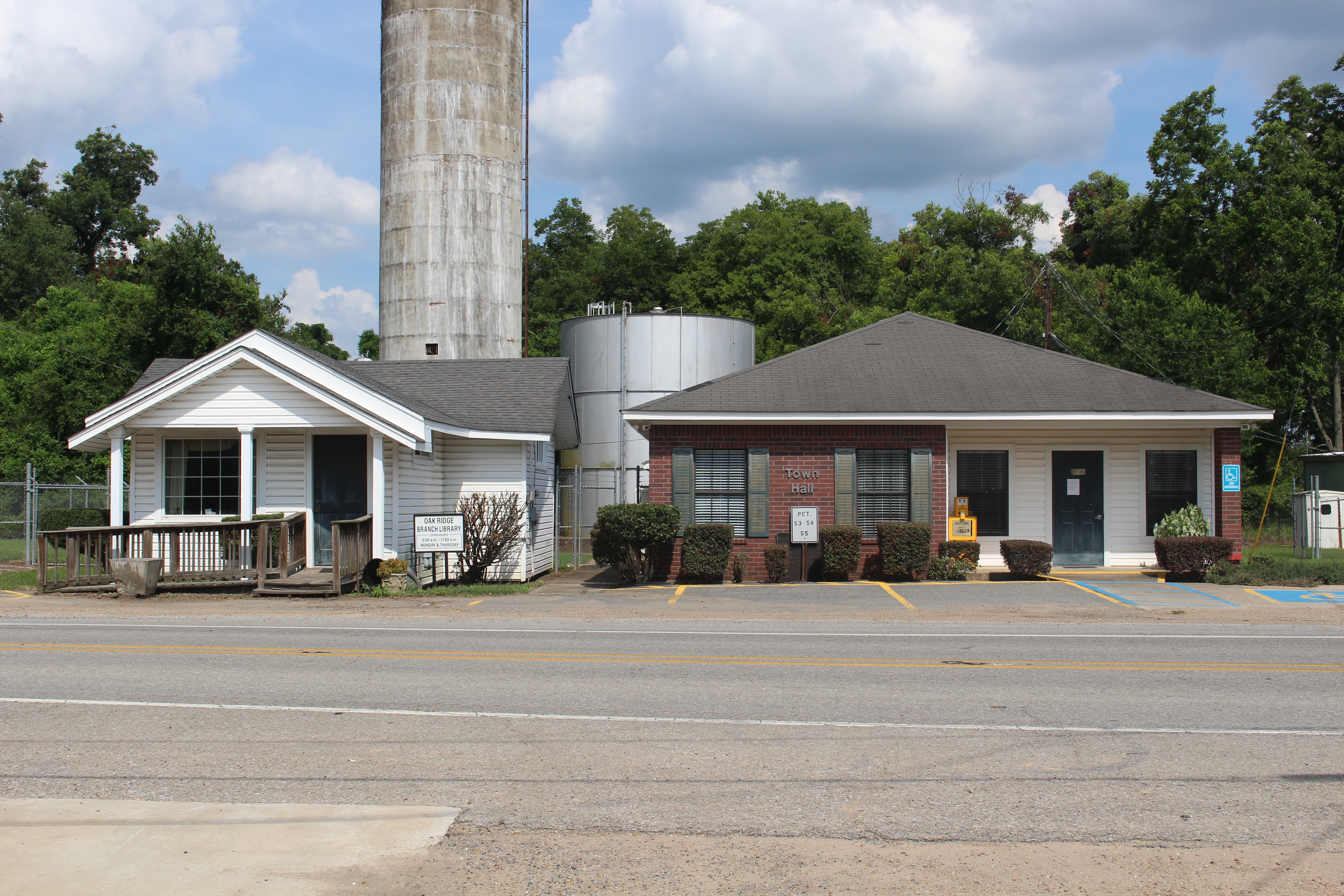
Oak Ridge Town Hall (Right) and Oak Ridge Branch Library (Left)

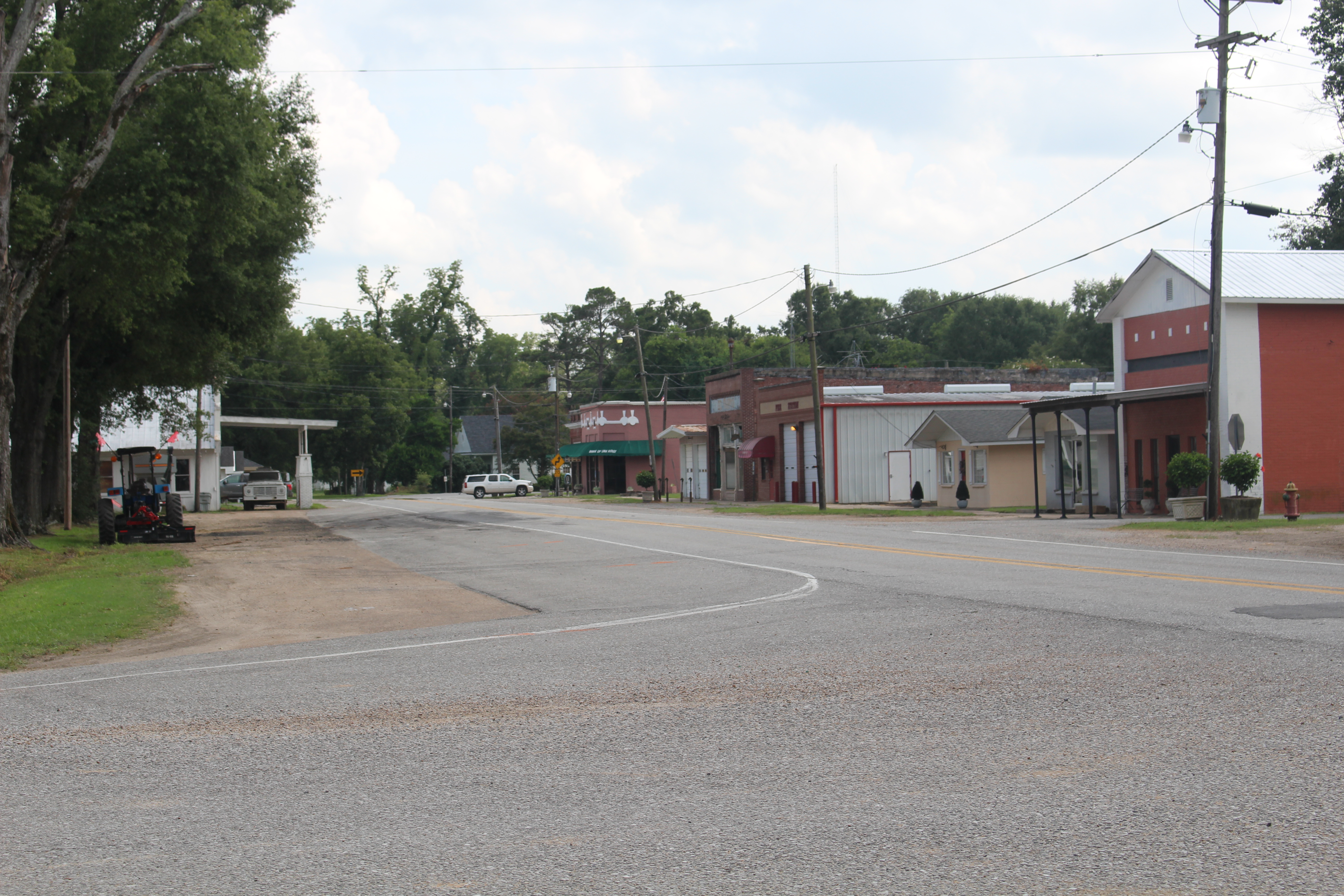
Main Street of Oak Ridge Louisiana

== Notable people ==
- Edwards Barham (1937―2014), Oak Ridge farmer and former Republican member of the Louisiana State Senate, who served from 1976 to 1980
- Abner Wimberly (1926―1976), NFL defensive end for the Los Angeles Dons and Green Bay Packers

== See also ==
- Excelsior (Oak Ridge, Louisiana)
