= Bob Dobelstein =

American football player (1922–2009)

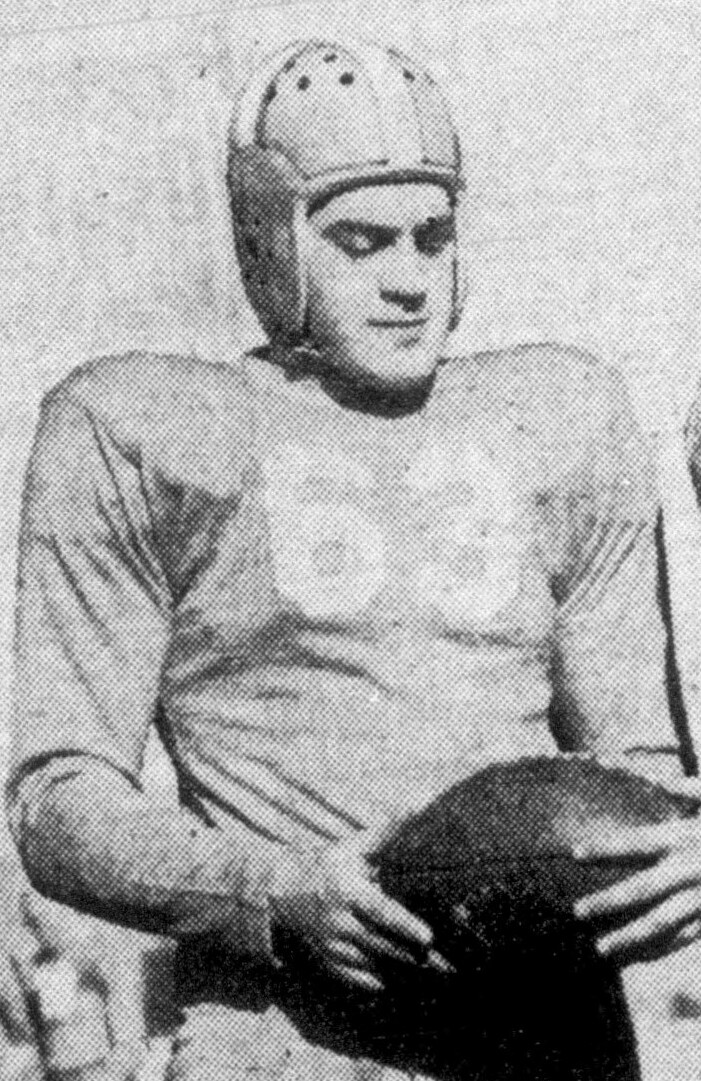
- Dobelstein, circa 1944

No. 67, 33
- Position: Guard

Personal information
- Born: October 27, 1922; Bridgeport, Connecticut, U.S.
- Died: November 13, 2009 (aged 87); Lake City, Florida, U.S.
- Listed height: 5 ft 11 in (1.80 m)
- Listed weight: 214 lb (97 kg)

Career information
- High school: Central (Bridgeport)
- College: Tennessee (1942, 1944-1945)
- NFL draft: 1945: 4th round, 28th overall pick

Career history
- New York Giants (1946–1948); Los Angeles Dons (1949)

Awards and highlights
- Third-team All-American (1944); 2× First-team All-SEC (1944, 1945)

Career NFL/AAFC statistics
- Games played: 41
- Games started: 34
- Fumble recoveries: 3
- Stats at Pro Football Reference

Robert Edward Dobelstein (October 27, 1922 – November 13, 2009) was an American football guard. He played for the New York Giants from 1946 to 1948 and for the Los Angeles Dons in 1949. He was selected by the Chicago Cardinals in the fourth round of the 1945 NFL draft with the 28th overall pick.

In Week 9 of the 1948 season, against the Los Angeles Rams, Dobelstein had a 20-yard interception return for a touchdown in the 52–37 loss.

== Death ==
Dobelstein died on November 13, 2009, in Lake City, Florida, aged 87.
