= 1945 All-Eastern football team =

American football team

The 1945 All-Eastern football team consists of American football players chosen at the end of the 1945 college football season as the best at each position from teams playing college football at schools in the Eastern United States. The organizations selecting All-Eastern teams in 1945 included the Associated Press (AP) and the United Press (UP).

The undefeated 1946 Army Cadets football team dominated the team with six players receiving first-team honors: backs Glenn Davis and Doc Blanchard; end Hank Foldberg; tackles Tex Coulter and Albert Nemetz; and guard John Green. A seventh Army player, Barney Poole, received second-team honors from the AP.

== All-Eastern selections ==
=== Backs ===
- Stan Kozlowski, Holy Cross (AP-1, UP-1)
- Glenn Davis, Army (AP-1, UP-1)
- Doc Blanchard, Army (AP-1, UP-1)
- Robert Evans, Penn (AP-1, UP-2)
- Lou Kusserow, Columbia (AP-2, UP-1)
- Al Dekdebrun, Cornell (AP-2)
- Meryl Frost, Dartmouth (AP-2)
- Clyde Scott, Navy (AP-2)
- Jim List, Brown (UP-2)
- Joe Tepsic, Penn State (UP-2)
- Gene Rossides, Columbia (UP-2)

=== Ends ===
- Hank Foldberg, Army (AP-1, UP-1)
- Dick Duden, Navy (AP-1, UP-1)
- Leon Bramlett, Navy (AP-2, UP-2)
- Barney Poole, Army (AP-2)

=== Tackles ===
- Tex Coulter, Army (AP-1, UP-1)
- Albert Nemetz, Army (AP-1, UP-2)
- George Savitsky, Penn (AP-2, UP-1)
- Richard Hollingshead, Yale (AP-2)
- Jim Karas, Columbia (UP-2)

=== Guards ===
- John Green, Army (AP-1, UP-1)
- Joe Dickerson, Penn (AP-1, UP-2)
- James Carrington, Navy (AP-2, UP-1)
- Jim Groh, Colgate (AP-2, UP-2)

=== Centers ===
- Richard Scott, Navy (AP-1, UP-1)
- Neill Zundel, Princeton (AP-2)
- Fritz Alexander (UP-2)

== Key ==
AP = Associated Press

UP = United Press

== See also ==
- 1946 College Football All-America Team
