= Dub Garrett =

American football player (1925–1976)

No. 30, 44
- Positions: Guard, defensive tackle

Personal information
- Born: January 29, 1925; Dundee, Mississippi, U.S.
- Died: July 24, 1976 (aged 51); Dundee, Mississippi, U.S.
- Listed height: 6 ft 1 in (1.85 m)
- Listed weight: 235 lb (107 kg)

Career information
- High school: Dundee
- College: Mississippi State (1944–1947)
- NFL draft: 1948: 3rd round, 21st overall pick

Career history
- Baltimore Colts (1948–1949); Chicago Bears (1950)

Awards and highlights
- First-team All-SEC (1947); 2× Second-team All-SEC (1944, 1946)

Career NFL/AAFC statistics
- Games played: 28
- Games started: 21
- Fumble recoveries: 3
- Stats at Pro Football Reference

William Davis "Dub" Garrett Jr. (January 29, 1925 – July 24, 1976) was an American professional football player who played for the Baltimore Colts of the All-America Football Conference (AAFC) and the Chicago Bears of the National Football League (NFL). He played college football at Mississippi State University.

== Early life and college ==
William Davis Garrett Jr. was born on January 29, 1925, in Dundee, Mississippi and attended Dundee High School. He lettered for the Mississippi State Bulldogs from 1944 to 1947. He was named second-team All-SEC by both the Associated Press (AP) and United Press (UP) his freshman year in 1944. In 1946, he was named second-team All-SEC by the AP again. Garrett was named first-team All-SEC by both the AP and UP his senior year in 1947. He was inducted into Mississippi State's athletic hall of fame in 1999.

== Professional career ==
Garrett was selected by the Baltimore Colts of the All-America Football Conference (AAFC) in the second round, with the 10th overall pick, of the 1948 AAFC draft, and by the Chicago Bears of the National Football League (NFL) in the third round, with the 21st overall pick, of the 1948 NFL draft. He chose to sign with the Colts and started all 14 games for them during the 1948 AAFC season. He also started one playoff game that season. Garrett played in 11 games, starting seven, in 1949, the final season of the AAFC.

Garrett signed with the Bears on October 7, 1950. He played in three games for the Bears during the 1950 season, recovering three fumbles for 62 yards and a touchdown. He led the NFL in fumble return yards and fumble return touchdowns that season. He was released in 1951.

== Personal life ==
Garrett died on July 24, 1976, in Dundee, Mississippi.
