= Clyde Scott =

American athlete (1924–2018)

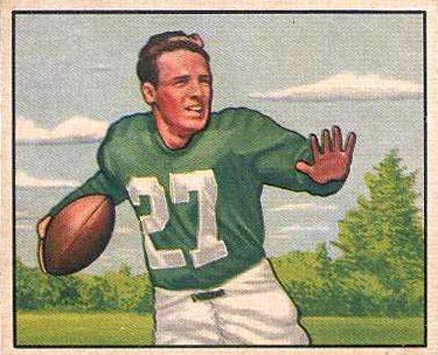
- 1950 Bowman Football card of Scott

No. 20, 27
- Positions: Halfback, defensive back

Personal information
- Born: August 29, 1924; Dixie, Louisiana, U.S.
- Died: January 30, 2018 (aged 93); Little Rock, Arkansas, U.S.
- Listed height: 6 ft 0 in (1.83 m)
- Listed weight: 174 lb (79 kg)

Career information
- High school: Smackover (AR); Bullis School (Potomac, Maryland)
- College: Navy (1944–1945) Arkansas (1946–1948)
- NFL draft: 1948: 1st round, 8th overall pick

Career history
- Philadelphia Eagles (1949–1952); Detroit Lions (1952)

Awards and highlights
- 2× NFL champion (1949, 1952); First-team All-American (1948); 2× Second-team All-American (1945, 1946); Third-team All-American (1947); 3× First-team All-SWC (1946, 1947, 1948); 2× Second-team All-Eastern (1944, 1945); Arkansas Razorbacks No. 12 retired; Arkansas Sports Hall of Fame

Career NFL statistics
- Rushing yards: 400
- Rushing average: 4
- Receptions: 19
- Receiving yards: 381
- Total touchdowns: 7
- Stats at Pro Football Reference
- College Football Hall of Fame

Clyde Luther Scott (August 29, 1924 – January 30, 2018) was an American athlete who played professional football in the National Football League (NFL) and earned an Olympic medal in the 110 meter hurdles. He was born in Dixie, Louisiana.

== Biography ==
Olympic medal record

Men's athletics

Representing the United States
| Silver medal – second place | 1948 London | 110 m hurdles |

Scott grew up in Smackover, Arkansas, and participated in both track and football at the University of Arkansas and the US Naval Academy. He was inducted into the College Football Hall of Fame and the Arkansas Sports Hall of Fame. He competed for the United States in the 1948 Summer Olympics held in London, Great Britain in the 110 meter hurdles where he won the silver medal.

While at the University of Arkansas, he was initiated into the Xi chapter of Kappa Sigma fraternity. Scott's nickname while at the University of Arkansas was "Smackover", after his hometown. Scott was a three-time All-SWC player at RB and DB, and an All-American in 1948. He helped Arkansas win the 1946 Southwest Conference championship, as well as leading the Razorbacks to their first-ever bowl victory, beating William & Mary 21–19 in the 1948 Dixie Bowl on January 1, 1948. Scott was also a track star at the UA, competing in the 100-yard dash and 110-meter hurdles.

Scott was the eighth player overall chosen in the 1948 NFL draft. Scott played five seasons in the National Football League for the Philadelphia Eagles and the Detroit Lions, appearing on two NFL championship teams. Scott had a career game on October 6, 1951, against the 49ers when he caught two touchdown passes (3 catches for 85 yards), and had a 40-yard run in the Eagles 21–14 upset win. The Eagles finished 4–8–0. The 49ers, at 7–4–1, finished 1/2 game behind the Conference Champion Rams. Scott was forced to retire in 1953 after suffering a knee injury.

In 2014 Scott was inducted into the Southwest Conference Hall of Fame. The University of Arkansas retired Scott's football jersey number 12, one of only two numbers the school has ever retired (the other is number 77, retired in honor of Brandon Burlsworth).

Scott died on January 30, 2018, at the age of 93. He is one of at least 345 NFL players to be diagnosed after death with chronic traumatic encephalopathy (CTE), which is caused by repeated hits to the head.
