= 1945 Baylor Bears football team =

American college football season

1945 Baylor Bears football
- Conference: Southwest Conference
- Record: 5–5–1 (2–4 SWC)
- Head coach: Frank Kimbrough (3rd season)
- Captains: Jack O. Price; Richard "Bull" Johnson
- Home stadium: Municipal Stadium

1945 Southwest Conference football standings
	Conf.					Overall
Team	W		L		T	W		L		T
No. 10 Texas $	5	–	1	–	0	10	–	1	–	0
SMU	4	–	2	–	0	5	–	6	–	0
TCU	3	–	3	–	0	5	–	5	–	0
Rice	3	–	3	–	0	5	–	6	–	0
Texas A&M	3	–	3	–	0	6	–	4	–	0
Baylor	2	–	4	–	0	5	–	5	–	1
Arkansas	1	–	5	–	0	3	–	7	–	0
$ – Conference champion; Rankings from AP Poll

The 1945 Baylor Bears football team represented Baylor University in the Southwest Conference (SWC) during the 1945 college football season. In their third, non-consecutive season under head coach Frank Kimbrough, the Bears compiled a 5–5–1 record (2–4 against conference opponents), finished in sixth place in the conference, and outscored opponents by a combined total of 178 to 141. They played their home games at Municipal Stadium in Waco, Texas. Jack O. Price and Richard "Bull" Johnson were the team captains.

== Schedule ==
Date	Opponent	Site	Result	Attendance	Source
September 15	Blackland AAF*	Municipal Stadium; Waco, TX	W 40–0	5,000	
September 22	West Texas State*	Municipal Stadium; Waco, TX	W 32–0	6,000	
September 29	TCU^{†}	Municipal Stadium; Waco, TX (rivalry)	L 6–7	5,000	
October 13	Arkansas	Municipal Stadium; Waco, TX	W 23–13	7,500	
October 20	at Texas Tech*	Tech Field; Lubbock, TX (rivalry)	T 7–7	9,000	
October 27	at Texas A&M	Kyle Field; College Station, TX (rivalry)	L 13–19		
November 3	Southwestern (TX)*	Municipal Stadium; Waco, TX	W 19–0	5,000	
November 10	at No. 17 Texas	War Memorial Stadium; Austin, TX (rivalry)	L 14–21	30,000	
November 17	at No. 19 Tulsa*	Skelly Field; Tulsa, OK	L 7–26	15,000	
November 24	SMU	Municipal Stadium; Waco, TX	L 0–34	9,000	
December 1	at Rice	Rice Field; Houston, TX	W 17–14	17,000	
*Non-conference game; ^{†}Homecoming; Rankings from AP Poll released prior to the game
