= 1945 Iowa State Cyclones football team =

American college football season

1945 Iowa State Cyclones football
- Conference: Big Six Conference
- Record: 4–3–1 (2–2–1 Big 6)
- Head coach: Mike Michalske (4th season)
- Captain: None
- Home stadium: Clyde Williams Field

1945 Big Six Conference football standings
	Conf.					Overall
Team	W		L		T	W		L		T
Missouri $	5	–	0	–	0	6	–	4	–	0
Oklahoma	4	–	1	–	0	5	–	5	–	0
Iowa State	2	–	2	–	1	4	–	3	–	1
Nebraska	2	–	3	–	0	4	–	5	–	0
Kansas	1	–	3	–	1	4	–	5	–	1
Kansas State	0	–	5	–	0	1	–	7	–	0
$ – Conference champion

The 1945 Iowa State Cyclones football team represented Iowa State College of Agricultural and Mechanic Arts (later renamed Iowa State University) in the Big Six Conference during the 1945 college football season. In their fourth year under head coach Mike Michalske, the Cyclones compiled a 4–3–1 record (2–2–1 against conference opponents), finished in third place in the conference, and outscored their opponents by a combined total of 156 to 97. They played their home games at Clyde Williams Field in Ames, Iowa.

There was no team captain selected for the 1945 season. Four Iowa State players were selected as a first-team all-conference players: guard Jack Fathauer, backs Dick Howard and Gene Phelps, and center Jim Riding.

== Schedule ==
Date	Time	Opponent	Site	Result	Attendance	Source
September 22	2:00 pm	at Northwestern*	Dyche Stadium; Evanston, IL	L 6–18	34,725	
September 29	2:00 pm	Iowa State Teachers*	Clyde Williams Field; Ames, IA	W 48–13	4,940	
October 6	2:00 pm	at Kansas	Memorial Stadium; Lawrence, KS	T 13–13	5,000	
October 13	2:00 pm	Missouri	Clyde Williams Field; Ames, IA (rivalry)	L 7–13	8,157	
October 20	2:00 pm	Nebraska^{†}	Clyde Williams Field; Ames, IA (rivalry)	W 27–7	11,699	
November 3	2:00 pm	Kansas State	Clyde Williams Field; Ames, IA (rivalry)	W 40–13	5,572	
November 10	2:30 pm	at Oklahoma	Oklahoma Memorial Stadium; Norman, OK	L 7–14	13,163	
November 17	2:00 pm	at Drake*	Drake Stadium; Des Moines, IA	W 8–6	8,442	
*Non-conference game; ^{†}Homecoming; All times are in Central time
