= 1945 Texas Longhorns football team =

American college football season

1945 Texas Longhorns football

SWC champion Cotton Bowl Classic champion

Cotton Bowl Classic, W 40–27 vs. Missouri
- Conference: Southwest Conference

Ranking
- AP: No. 10
- Record: 10–1 (5–1 SWC)
- Head coach: Dana X. Bible (9th season)
- Home stadium: War Memorial Stadium

1945 Southwest Conference football standings
	Conf.					Overall
Team	W		L		T	W		L		T
No. 10 Texas $	5	–	1	–	0	10	–	1	–	0
SMU	4	–	2	–	0	5	–	6	–	0
TCU	3	–	3	–	0	5	–	5	–	0
Rice	3	–	3	–	0	5	–	6	–	0
Texas A&M	3	–	3	–	0	6	–	4	–	0
Baylor	2	–	4	–	0	5	–	5	–	1
Arkansas	1	–	5	–	0	3	–	7	–	0
$ – Conference champion; Rankings from AP Poll

The 1945 Texas Longhorns football team was an American football team that represented the University of Texas (now known as the University of Texas at Austin) as a member of the Southwest Conference (SWC) during the 1945 college football season. In their ninth year under head coach Dana X. Bible, the Longhorns compiled an overall record of 10–1, with a mark of 5–1 in conference play, and finished as SWC champion. Texas concluded their season with a victory over Missouri in the Cotton Bowl Classic.

== Schedule ==
Date	Time	Opponent	Rank	Site	Result	Attendance	Source
September 22		Bergstrom Field*		War Memorial Stadium; Austin, TX	W 13–7	15,000	
September 29	2:30 p.m.	Southwestern (TX)*		War Memorial Stadium; Austin, TX	W 46–0	9,000	
October 6		Texas Tech*		War Memorial Stadium; Austin, TX (rivalry)	W 33–0		
October 13		vs. Oklahoma*	No. 10	Cotton Bowl; Dallas, TX (rivalry)	W 12–7	45,000	
October 20		at Arkansas	No. 10	Quigley Stadium; Little Rock, AR (rivalry)	W 34–7	15,000	
October 27		Rice	No. 9	War Memorial Stadium; Austin, TX (rivalry)	L 6–7	23,000	
November 3		at SMU		Ownby Stadium; University Park, TX	W 12–7	23,000	
November 10		Baylor	No. 17	War Memorial Stadium; Austin, TX (rivalry)	W 21–14	30,000	
November 17		TCU	No. 17	War Memorial Stadium; Austin, TX (rivalry)	W 20–0	27,000	
November 29		at Texas A&M	No. 10	Kyle Field; College Station, TX (rivalry)	W 20–10	41,000	
January 1, 1946		vs. Missouri*	No. 10	Cotton Bowl; Dallas, TX (Cotton Bowl Classic)	W 40–27	46,000	
*Non-conference game; Rankings from AP Poll released prior to the game; All times are in Central time

== Rankings ==
Ranking movements Legend: ██ Increase in ranking ██ Decrease in ranking — = Not ranked
	Week								
Poll	1	2	3	4	5	6	7	8	Final
AP	10	10	9	—	17	17	10	10	10

== Awards and honors ==
- Hub Bechtol, End, Cotton Bowl co-Most Valuable Player
- Bobby Layne, Back, Cotton Bowl co-Most Valuable Player
- Hub Bechtol, Consensus All-American
