= 1945 Missouri Tigers football team =

American college football season

1945 Missouri Tigers football

Big 6 champion

Cotton Bowl Classic, L 27–40 vs. Texas
- Conference: Big Six Conference
- Record: 6–4 (5–0 Big 6)
- Head coach: Chauncey Simpson (3rd season)
- Home stadium: Memorial Stadium

1945 Big Six Conference football standings
	Conf.					Overall
Team	W		L		T	W		L		T
Missouri $	5	–	0	–	0	6	–	4	–	0
Oklahoma	4	–	1	–	0	5	–	5	–	0
Iowa State	2	–	2	–	1	4	–	3	–	1
Nebraska	2	–	3	–	0	4	–	5	–	0
Kansas	1	–	3	–	1	4	–	5	–	1
Kansas State	0	–	5	–	0	1	–	7	–	0
$ – Conference champion

The 1945 Missouri Tigers football team was an American football team that represented the University of Missouri in the Big Six Conference (Big 6) during the 1945 college football season. The team compiled a 6–4 record (5–0 against Big 6 opponents), won the Big 6 championship, lost to Texas in the 1946 Cotton Bowl Classic, and was outscored by all opponents by a combined total of 174 to 170. Chauncey Simpson was the head coach for the third of three seasons. The team played its home games at Memorial Stadium in Columbia, Missouri.

The team's leading scorers were Loyd Brinkman and Robert Hopkins, each with 30 points.

== Schedule ==
Date	Opponent	Rank	Site	Result	Attendance	Source
September 22	at Minnesota*		Memorial Stadium; Minneapolis, MN	L 0–34	34,246	
September 29	Ohio State*		Memorial Stadium; Columbia, MO	L 6–47	41,299	
October 6	at SMU*		Ownby Stadium; University Park, TX	W 10–7	8,000	
October 13	at Iowa State		Clyde Williams Field; Ames, IA (rivalry)	W 13–7	8,157	
October 20	Kansas State		Memorial Stadium; Columbia, MO	W 41–7		
October 27	Nebraska		Memorial Stadium; Columbia, MO (rivalry)	W 19–0		
November 3	at Michigan State*		Macklin Field; East Lansing, MI	L 7–14		
November 17	No. T–14 Oklahoma		Memorial Stadium; Columbia, MO (rivalry)	W 14–6		
November 24	vs. Kansas	No. 16	Blues Stadium; Kansas City, MO (rivalry)	W 33–12	21,494	
January 1, 1946	vs. No. 10 Texas		Cotton Bowl; Dallas, TX (Cotton Bowl)	L 27–40	46,000	
*Non-conference game; Rankings from AP Poll released prior to the game

== Rankings ==
Ranking movements Legend: ██ Increase in ranking ██ Decrease in ranking — = Not ranked т = Tied with team above or below
	Week								
Poll	1	2	3	4	5	6	7	8	Final
AP	—	—	—	—	—	—	16	14т	—
