= 1945 Texas Tech Red Raiders football team =

American college football season

1945 Texas Tech Red Raiders football
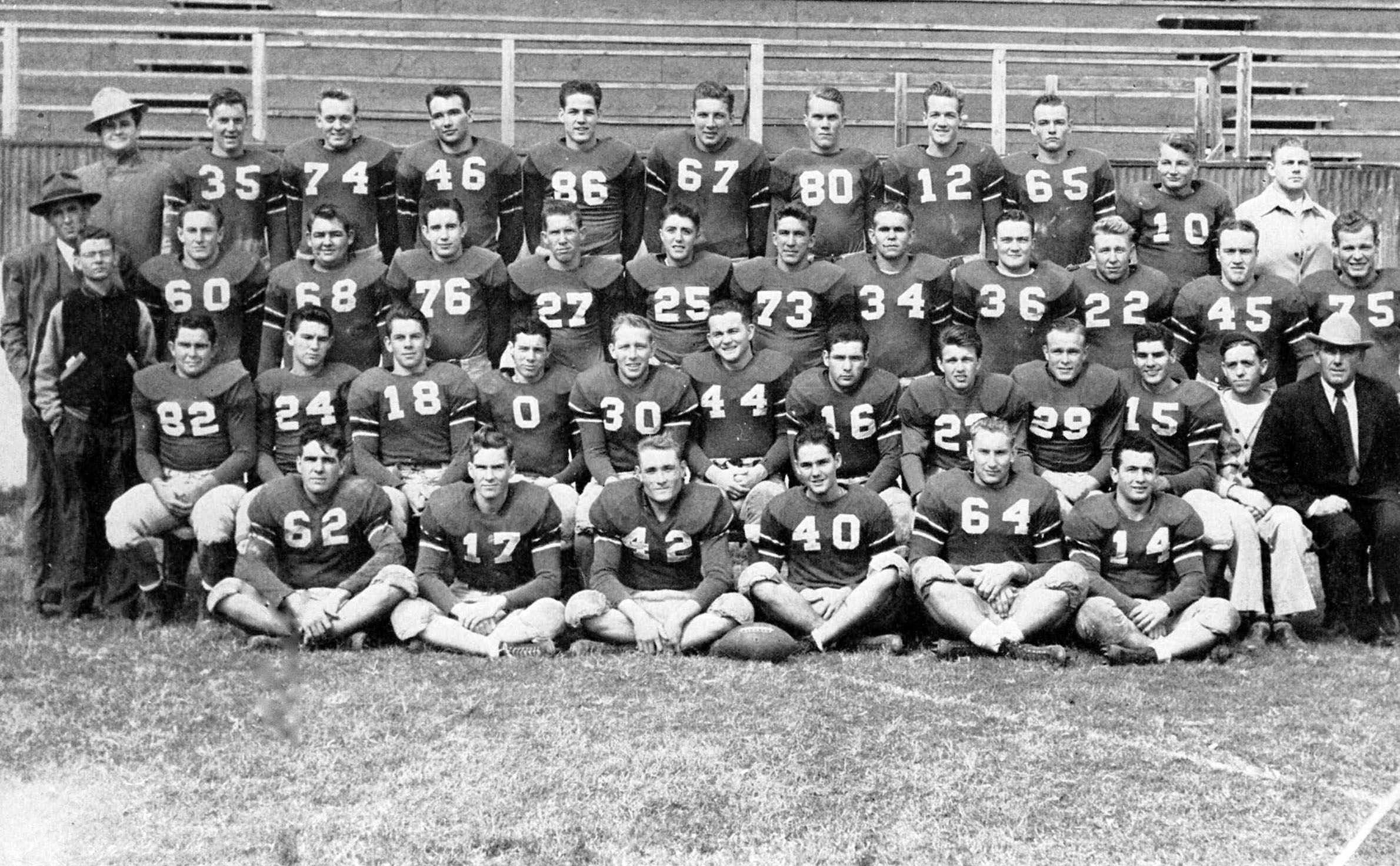
- Conference: Border Conference
- Record: 3–5–2 (1–0–1 Border)
- Head coach: Dell Morgan (5th season)
- Offensive scheme: Single-wing
- Base defense: 6–2
- Home stadium: Tech Field

1945 Border Conference football standings
	Conf.					Overall
Team	W		L		T	W		L		T
New Mexico	1	–	0	–	1	6	–	1	–	1
Texas Tech	1	–	0	–	1	3	–	5	–	2
West Texas State	0	–	2	–	0	2	–	6	–	0
Arizona	0	–	0	–	0	5	–	0	–	0
Arizona State–Flagstaff	0	–	0	–	0	2	–	3	–	0
$ – Conference champion

The 1945 Texas Tech Red Raiders football team represented Texas Technological College—now known as Texas Tech University—as a member of the Border Conference during the 1945 college football season. Led by fifth-year head coach Dell Morgan, the Red Raiders compiled an overall record of 3–5–2 with a mark of 1–0–1 in conference play. No Border Conference title was awarded. The team played home games at Tech Field in Lubbock, Texas.

== Schedule ==
Date	Time	Opponent	Site	Result	Attendance	Source
September 22	8:15 p.m.	Southwestern (TX)*	Tech Field; Lubbock, TX	W 7–0	7,000	
September 29		vs. Texas A&M*	Alamo Stadium; San Antonio, TX (rivalry)	L 6–16	22,831	
October 6		at Texas*	War Memorial Stadium; Austin, TX (rivalry)	L 0–33		
October 13		No. 16 Tulsa*	Tech Field; Lubbock, TX	L 7–18	9,000	
October 20		Baylor*	Tech Field; Lubbock, TX (rivalry)	T 7–7	9,000	
October 27		West Texas State	Tech Field; Lubbock, TX	W 12–6	6,000	
November 3		at Rice*	Rice Field; Houston, TX	L 0–13	17,000	
November 10		TCU*^{†}	Tech Field; Lubbock, TX (rivalry)	W 12–0	10,000	
November 17		at No. 8 Oklahoma A&M*	Lewis Field; Stillwaker, OK	L 6–46	10,000	
November 24		at New Mexico	Lobo Stadium; Albuquerque, NM	T 6–6	8,000	
*Non-conference game; ^{†}Homecoming; Rankings from AP Poll released prior to the game; All times are in Central time
