= 1945 Southwestern Pirates football team =

American college football season

1945 Southwestern Pirates football
- Conference: Texas Conference
- Record: 2–6–1 (0–0 Texas)
- Head coach: Randolph M. Medley (7th season)
- Captain: Ed J. "Blotz" Blodzinski

The 1945 Southwestern Pirates football team represented Southwestern University during the 1945 college football season. Led by seventh-year head coach Randolph M. Medley, the Pirates compiled a record of 2–6–1.

== Schedule ==
Date	Time	Opponent	Site	Result	Attendance	Source
September 14		Bergstrom Field*	Georgetown, TX	T 6–6		
September 22	8:15 p.m.	at Texas Tech*	Tech Field; Lubbock, TX	L 0–7	7,000	
September 29	2:30 p.m.	at Texas*	War Memorial Stadium; Austin, TX	L 0–46	9,000	
October 6		at Rice*	Rice Field; Houston, TX	W 13–7	11,000	
October 13		vs. University of Mexico*	San Antonio, TX	W 32–6	8,500	
October 20		at Louisiana Tech*	Tech Stadium; Ruston, LA	L 14–20		
November 3		at Baylor*	Waco, TX	L 0–19	5,000	
November 16		at North Camp Hood*	Gatesville, TX	L 13–18		
November 24		vs. Hondo AAF*	Big Spring, TX	L 7–19	3,000	
*Non-conference game; All times are in Central time
