= 1945 TCU Horned Frogs football team =

American college football season

1945 TCU Horned Frogs football
- Conference: Southwest Conference
- Record: 5–5 (3–3 SWC)
- Head coach: Dutch Meyer (12th season)
- Offensive scheme: Meyer spread
- Home stadium: Amon G. Carter Stadium

1945 Southwest Conference football standings
	Conf.					Overall
Team	W		L		T	W		L		T
No. 10 Texas $	5	–	1	–	0	10	–	1	–	0
SMU	4	–	2	–	0	5	–	6	–	0
TCU	3	–	3	–	0	5	–	5	–	0
Rice	3	–	3	–	0	5	–	6	–	0
Texas A&M	3	–	3	–	0	6	–	4	–	0
Baylor	2	–	4	–	0	5	–	5	–	1
Arkansas	1	–	5	–	0	3	–	7	–	0
$ – Conference champion; Rankings from AP Poll

The 1945 TCU Horned Frogs football team represented Texas Christian University (TCU) in the 1945 college football season. The Horned Frogs finished the season 5–5 overall and 3–3 in the Southwest Conference. The team was coached by Dutch Meyer in his twelfth year as head coach. The Frogs played their home games in Amon G. Carter Stadium, which is located on campus in Fort Worth, Texas.

== Schedule ==
Date	Opponent	Site	Result	Attendance	Source
September 22	vs. Kansas*	Blues Stadium; Kansas City, MO	W 18–0	13,588	
September 29	at Baylor	Municipal Stadium; Waco, TX (rivalry)	W 7–6	5,000	
October 6	at Arkansas	Razorback Stadium; Fayetteville, AR	L 14–27	8,000	
October 20	Texas A&M	Amon G. Carter Stadium; Fort Worth, TX (rivalry)	W 13–12	23,000	
October 27	No. 17 Oklahoma A&M*	Amon G. Carter Stadium; Fort Worth, TX	L 12–25	15,000	
November 3	at No. 14 Oklahoma*	Oklahoma Memorial Stadium; Norman, OK	W 13–7	21,000	
November 10	at Texas Tech*	Tech Field; Lubbock, TX (rivalry)	L 0–12	10,000	
November 17	at No. 17 Texas	War Memorial Stadium; Austin, TX (rivalry)	L 0–20	27,000	
November 24	Rice	Amon G. Carter Stadium; Fort Worth, TX	W 14–13	14,000	
December 1	SMU	Amon G. Carter Stadium; Fort Worth, TX (rivalry)	L 0–34	18,000	
*Non-conference game; Rankings from AP Poll released prior to the game
