= 1945 Kansas Jayhawks football team =

American college football season

1945 Kansas Jayhawks football
- Conference: Big Six Conference
- Record: 4–5–1 (1–3–1 Big 6)
- Head coach: Henry Shenk (3rd season)
- Captain: Dave Schmidt
- Home stadium: Memorial Stadium

1945 Big Six Conference football standings
	Conf.					Overall
Team	W		L		T	W		L		T
Missouri $	5	–	0	–	0	6	–	4	–	0
Oklahoma	4	–	1	–	0	5	–	5	–	0
Iowa State	2	–	2	–	1	4	–	3	–	1
Nebraska	2	–	3	–	0	4	–	5	–	0
Kansas	1	–	3	–	1	4	–	5	–	1
Kansas State	0	–	5	–	0	1	–	7	–	0
$ – Conference champion

The 1945 Kansas Jayhawks football team represented the University of Kansas in the Big Six Conference during the 1945 college football season. In their third and final season under head coach Henry Shenk, the Jayhawks compiled a 4–5–1 record (1–3–1 against conference opponents), finished fifth in the conference, and were outscored by opponents by a combined total of 175 to 139. They played their home games at Memorial Stadium in Lawrence, Kansas.

The team's statistical leaders included Dick Bertuzzi with 360 rushing yards, George Gear with 223 passing yards, Norm Pumphrey with 212 receiving yards, and Leroy Robison with 46 points scored (six touchdowns and ten extra points). Dave Schmidt was the team captain.

== Schedule ==
Date	Opponent	Site	Result	Attendance	Source
September 22	vs. TCU*	Blues Stadium; Kansas City, MO	L 0–18	13,588	
September 28	at Denver*	Hilltop Stadium; Denver, CO	W 20–19	12,000	
October 6	Iowa State	Memorial Stadium; Lawrence, KS	T 13–13	5,000	
October 12	Washburn*	Memorial Stadium; Lawrence, KS	W 34–0	7,500	
October 20	at Oklahoma	Owen Field; Norman, OK	L 7–39	13,000	
October 27	at Wichita*	Wichita, KS	W 13–0	10,000	
November 3	at Nebraska	Memorial Stadium; Lincoln, NE (rivalry)	L 13–27	15,000	
November 10	at Marquette*	Marquette Stadium; Milwaukee, WI	L 0–26	9,000	
November 17	Kansas State^{†}	Memorial Stadium; Lawrence, KS (rivalry)	W 27–0	15,700	
November 24	No. 16 Missouri	Blues Stadium; Kansas City, MO (rivalry)	L 12–33	21,494	
*Non-conference game; ^{†}Homecoming; Rankings from AP Poll released prior to the game
