= 1945 Rice Owls football team =

American college football season

1945 Rice Owls football
- Conference: Southwest Conference
- Record: 5–6 (3–3 SWC)
- Head coach: Jess Neely (6th season)
- Home stadium: Rice Field

1945 Southwest Conference football standings
	Conf.					Overall
Team	W		L		T	W		L		T
No. 10 Texas $	5	–	1	–	0	10	–	1	–	0
SMU	4	–	2	–	0	5	–	6	–	0
TCU	3	–	3	–	0	5	–	5	–	0
Rice	3	–	3	–	0	5	–	6	–	0
Texas A&M	3	–	3	–	0	6	–	4	–	0
Baylor	2	–	4	–	0	5	–	5	–	1
Arkansas	1	–	5	–	0	3	–	7	–	0
$ – Conference champion; Rankings from AP Poll

The 1945 Rice Owls football team was an American football team that represented Rice Institute as a member of the Southwest Conference (SWC) during the 1945 college football season. In its sixth season under head coach Jess Neely, the team compiled a 5–6 record (3–3 against SWC opponents) and was outscored by a total of 153 to 130.

== Schedule ==
Date	Opponent	Site	Result	Attendance	Source
September 22	Corpus Christi NAS*	Rice Field; Houston, TX	L 13–26	12,000	
September 29	at LSU*	Tiger Stadium; Baton Rouge, LA	L 0–42	28,000	
October 6	Southwestern (TX)*	Rice Field; Houston, TX	L 7–13	11,000	
October 13	Tulane*	Rice Field; Houston, TX	W 13–7	14,000	
October 20	at SMU	Ownby Stadium; University Park, TX (rivalry)	L 18–21	10,000	
October 27	at No. 9 Texas	Memorial Stadium; Austin, TX (rivalry)	W 7–6	23,000	
November 3	Texas Tech*	Rice Field; Houston, TX	W 13–0	17,000	
November 10	Arkansas^{†}	Rice Field; Houston, TX	W 26–7		
November 17	Texas A&M	Rice Field; Houston, TX	W 6–0	29,000	
November 24	at TCU	Amon G. Carter Stadium; Fort Worth, TX	L 13–14	14,000	
December 1	Baylor	Rice Field; Houston, TX	L 14–17	17,000	
*Non-conference game; ^{†}Homecoming; Rankings from AP Poll released prior to the game
