= California–UCLA football rivalry =

American college football rivalry

- California Golden Bears UCLA Bruins
- First meeting: November 4, 1933; 92 years ago Tie, 0–0
- Latest meeting: September 5, 2026; UCLA, 45–24
- Next meeting: September 4, 2027; Pasadena, Calif.

Statistics
- Total meetings: 95
- All-time series: UCLA leads, 58–35–1
- Largest victory: UCLA, 56–3 (1965)
- Longest win streak: UCLA, 12 (1978–1989)
- Current win streak: UCLA, 1 (2026–present)

Locations of Cal and UCLA

The California–UCLA football rivalry is an American college football rivalry between the California Golden Bears football team of the University of California, Berkeley and UCLA Bruins football team of the University of California, Los Angeles.

== History ==
Traditionally, the Cal–UCLA rivalry is played on "All-University Weekend". During the same week, Cal and UCLA usually play each other in any other sports in season, and the schools host festivals celebrating the achievements of the UC System. Played annually since 1933, it was the third-longest never-interrupted rivalry in college football, behind only Iowa State vs. Kansas State (uninterrupted since 1917), and Navy vs. Notre Dame (uninterrupted from 1927 until 2020). Because so many college football teams did not play in 2020 due to the Covid pandemic, the Cal-UCLA rivalry was the second-longest never-interrupted rivalry in college football and one of two never-interrupted rivalries that still exist in the Football Bowl Subdivision (FBS) of NCAA Division I college football.

In 2020, the rivalry was set to end its yearly streak due to the pandemic-shortened 2020 season. However, after unexpected cancellations for both Cal and UCLA on November 13, 2020, the Pac-12 scheduled the game for November 15, 2020. The game alternates between the two respective schools. Except for 2020, contests in odd-numbered years are played in Pasadena and even-numbered years in Berkeley. The rivalry was interrupted when UCLA joined the Big Ten and Cal joined the ACC in 2024. Cal and UCLA have agreed to play non-conference games from 2026−2029, with games being played at California Memorial Stadium in 2026 & 2028 and the Rose Bowl in 2027 & 2029.

== Game results ==
California victories	UCLA victories	Tie games	Forfeits / Vacated wins

No.	Date	Location	Winning team		Losing team	
1	November 4, 1933	Los Angeles	Tie	0	Tie	0
2	October 20, 1934	Berkeley	California	3	UCLA	0
3	November 2, 1935	Los Angeles	California	14	UCLA	2
4	October 17, 1936	Berkeley	UCLA	17	California	6
5	October 30, 1937	Los Angeles	#1 California	27	UCLA	14
6	October 15, 1938	Berkeley	California	20	UCLA	7
7	November 4, 1939	Los Angeles	#19 UCLA	20	California	7
8	October 19, 1940	Berkeley	California	9	UCLA	7
9	November 1, 1941	Los Angeles	California	27	UCLA	7
10	October 17, 1942	Berkeley	UCLA	21	California	0
11	October 16, 1943	Los Angeles	California	13	UCLA	0
12	November 13, 1943	Berkeley	California	13	UCLA	6
13	September 30, 1944	Berkeley	California	6	UCLA	0
14	November 11, 1944	Los Angeles	UCLA	7	California	0
15	October 13, 1945	Los Angeles	UCLA	13	California	0
16	November 24, 1945	Berkeley	#12 California	6	UCLA	0
17	October 19, 1946	Berkeley	#4 UCLA	13	California	6
18	November 1, 1947	Los Angeles	#14 California	6	#19 UCLA	0
19	November 6, 1948	Berkeley	#5 California	28	UCLA	13
20	October 29, 1949	Los Angeles	#4 California	35	#20 UCLA	21
21	November 11, 1950	Berkeley	#6 California	35	#19 UCLA	0
22	November 3, 1951	Los Angeles	UCLA	21	#9 California	7
23	November 1, 1952	Berkeley	#7 UCLA	28	#11 California	7
24	October 31, 1953	Los Angeles	#10 UCLA	20	California	7
25	October 30, 1954	Berkeley	#3 UCLA	27	California	6
26	October 29, 1955	Los Angeles	#6 UCLA	47	California	0
27	October 20, 1956	Berkeley	UCLA	34	California	20
28	November 2, 1957	Los Angeles	UCLA	16	California	14
29	November 8, 1958	Berkeley	California	20	UCLA	17
30	October 17, 1959	Los Angeles	UCLA	19	California	12
31	November 5, 1960	Berkeley	#15 UCLA	28	California	0
32	November 4, 1961	Los Angeles	UCLA	35	California	15
33	November 3, 1962	Berkeley	UCLA	26	California	16
34	November 2, 1963	Los Angeles	California	25	UCLA	0
35	October 31, 1964	Berkeley	UCLA	25	California	21
36	October 23, 1965	Los Angeles	UCLA	56	California	3
37	October 22, 1966	Berkeley	#3 UCLA	28	California	15
38	October 14, 1967	Los Angeles	#4 UCLA	37	California	14
39	October 19, 1968	Berkeley	California	39	UCLA	15
40	October 18, 1969	Los Angeles	#8 UCLA	32	California	0
41	October 17, 1970	Berkeley	#19 UCLA	24	California	21
42	October 23, 1971	Los Angeles	California	31	UCLA	24
43	October 21, 1972	Berkeley	#11 UCLA	49	California	13
44	October 27, 1973	Los Angeles	#13 UCLA	61	California	21
45	October 26, 1974	Berkeley	UCLA	28	#18 California	3
46	October 25, 1975	Los Angeles	#19 UCLA	28	California	14
47	October 23, 1976	Berkeley	#4 UCLA	35	California	19
48	October 22, 1977	Los Angeles	#15 California	19	UCLA^{†}	21
49	October 21, 1978	Berkeley	#10 UCLA	45	California	0
50	October 20, 1979	Los Angeles	UCLA	28	California	27
51	October 25, 1980	Berkeley	#3 UCLA	32	California	9
52	October 24, 1981	Los Angeles	UCLA	34	California	6
53	October 23, 1982	Berkeley	#11 UCLA	47	California	31
54	October 22, 1983	Pasadena	UCLA	20	California	16
55	October 20, 1984	Berkeley	UCLA	17	California	14
56	October 26, 1985	Pasadena	#17 UCLA	34	California	7
57	October 18, 1986	Berkeley	#19 UCLA	36	California	10
58	October 24, 1987	Pasadena	#8 UCLA	42	California	18
59	October 8, 1988	Berkeley	#2 UCLA	38	California	21
60	September 30, 1989	Pasadena	UCLA	24	California	6
61	October 20, 1990	Berkeley	California	18	UCLA	6
62	October 5, 1991	Pasadena	#18 California	27	#24 UCLA	24
63	October 31, 1992	Berkeley	California	48	UCLA	12
64	September 4, 1993	Pasadena	California	27	UCLA	25
65	October 8, 1994	Berkeley	California	26	UCLA	7
66	October 28, 1995	Pasadena	#24 UCLA	33	California	16
67	October 26, 1996	Berkeley	UCLA	38	California	29
68	October 25, 1997	Pasadena	#13 UCLA	35	California	17
69	October 24, 1998	Berkeley	#2 UCLA	28	California	16
70	October 16, 1999	Pasadena	California^{‡}	17	UCLA	0
71	October 14, 2000	Berkeley	California	46	#13 UCLA	38
72	October 20, 2001	Pasadena	#4 UCLA	56	California	17
73	October 19, 2002	Berkeley	California	17	UCLA	12
74	October 18, 2003	Pasadena	UCLA	23	California	20
75	October 16, 2004	Berkeley	#8 California	45	UCLA	28
76	October 8, 2005	Pasadena	#20 UCLA	47	#10 California	40
77	November 4, 2006	Berkeley	#10 California	38	UCLA	24
78	October 20, 2007	Pasadena	UCLA	30	#10 California	21
79	October 25, 2008	Berkeley	California	41	UCLA	20
80	October 17, 2009	Pasadena	California	45	UCLA	26
81	October 9, 2010	Berkeley	California	35	UCLA	7
82	October 29, 2011	Pasadena	UCLA	31	California	14
83	October 6, 2012	Berkeley	California	43	#25 UCLA	17
84	October 12, 2013	Pasadena	UCLA	37	California	10
85	October 18, 2014	Berkeley	UCLA	36	California	34
86	October 22, 2015	Pasadena	UCLA	40	#20 California	24
87	November 26, 2016	Berkeley	California	36	UCLA	10
88	November 24, 2017	Pasadena	UCLA	30	California	27
89	October 13, 2018	Berkeley	UCLA	37	California	7
90	November 30, 2019	Pasadena	California	28	UCLA	18
91	November 15, 2020	Pasadena	UCLA	34	California	10
92	November 27, 2021	Pasadena	UCLA	42	California	14
93	November 25, 2022	Berkeley	#18 UCLA	35	California	28
94	November 25, 2023	Pasadena	California	33	UCLA	7
95	September 5, 2026	Berkeley	UCLA	45	California	24
Series: UCLA leads 58–35–1
† UCLA forfeited win. ‡ California vacated win.

== See also ==
- California–USC football rivalry
- List of NCAA college football rivalry games
- Stanford–USC football rivalry
