= 1945 Arkansas Razorbacks football team =

American college football season

1945 Arkansas Razorbacks football
- Conference: Southwest Conference
- Record: 3–7 (1–5 SWC)
- Head coach: Glen Rose (2nd season)
- Captains: Earl Wheeler; Henry Ford
- Home stadium: Razorback Stadium

1945 Southwest Conference football standings
	Conf.					Overall
Team	W		L		T	W		L		T
No. 10 Texas $	5	–	1	–	0	10	–	1	–	0
SMU	4	–	2	–	0	5	–	6	–	0
TCU	3	–	3	–	0	5	–	5	–	0
Rice	3	–	3	–	0	5	–	6	–	0
Texas A&M	3	–	3	–	0	6	–	4	–	0
Baylor	2	–	4	–	0	5	–	5	–	1
Arkansas	1	–	5	–	0	3	–	7	–	0
$ – Conference champion; Rankings from AP Poll

The 1945 Arkansas Razorbacks football team represented the University of Arkansas in the Southwest Conference (SWC) during the 1945 college football season. In their second and final year under head coach Glen Rose, the Razorbacks compiled a 3–7 record (1–5 against SWC opponents), finished in last place in the SWC, and were outscored by their opponents by a combined total of 222 to 112.

Running back John Hoffman led the team in both rushing and receiving in 1945. He totaled 587 rushing yards on 139 carries (4.2 yard per carry and caught 11 passes for 198 yards. Quarterback Bud Canada completed 24 of 69 passes for 272 yards.

== Schedule ==
Date	Opponent	Site	Result	Attendance	Source
September 22	at Barksdale Field*	Louisiana State Fair Grounds; Shreveport, LA	W 12–6	7,000	
September 29	Oklahoma A&M*	Razorback Stadium; Fayetteville, AR	L 14–19	10,000	
October 6	No. 10 TCU	Razorback Stadium; Fayetteville, AR	W 27–14	8,000	
October 13	at Baylor	Municipal Stadium; Waco, TX	L 13–23	7,500	
October 20	Texas	Quigley Stadium; Little Rock, AR (rivalry)	L 7–34	15,000	
October 27	vs. Ole Miss*	Crump Stadium; Memphis, TN (rivalry)	W 19–0	23,000	
November 3	Texas A&M^{†}	Razorback Stadium; Fayetteville, AR (rivalry)	L 0–34	13,500	
November 10	at Rice	Rice Field; Houston, TX	L 7–26		
November 17	at SMU	Ownby Stadium; University Park, TX	L 0–21	9,000	
November 22	at No. 17 Tulsa*	Skelly Stadium; Tulsa, OK	L 13–45	17,000	
*Non-conference game; ^{†}Homecoming; Rankings from AP Poll released prior to the game
