= 1945 Texas A&M Aggies football team =

American college football season

1945 Texas A&M Aggies football
- Conference: Southwest Conference
- Record: 6–4 (3–3 SWC)
- Head coach: Homer Norton (12th season)
- Home stadium: Kyle Field

1945 Southwest Conference football standings
	Conf.					Overall
Team	W		L		T	W		L		T
No. 10 Texas $	5	–	1	–	0	10	–	1	–	0
SMU	4	–	2	–	0	5	–	6	–	0
TCU	3	–	3	–	0	5	–	5	–	0
Rice	3	–	3	–	0	5	–	6	–	0
Texas A&M	3	–	3	–	0	6	–	4	–	0
Baylor	2	–	4	–	0	5	–	5	–	1
Arkansas	1	–	5	–	0	3	–	7	–	0
$ – Conference champion; Rankings from AP Poll

The 1945 Texas A&M Aggies football team represented the Agricultural and Mechanical College of Texas—now known as Texas A&M University—in the Southwest Conference (SWC) during the 1945 college football season. In its 12th season under head coach Homer Norton, the team compiled an overall record of 6–4, with a mark of 3–3 in conference play, and finished tied for third in the SWC.

== Schedule ==
Date	Time	Opponent	Rank	Site	Result	Attendance	Source
September 22	2:30 p.m.	Ellington Field*		Kyle Field; College Station, TX	W 54–0		
September 29		vs. Texas Tech*		Alamo Stadium; San Antonio, TX (rivalry)	W 16–6	22,831	
October 6		at Oklahoma*		Oklahoma Memorial Stadium; Norman, OK	W 19–14	20,000	
October 13		at LSU*	No. 17	Tiger Stadium; Baton Rouge, LA (rivalry)	L 12–31	25,000	
October 20		at TCU		Amon G. Carter Stadium; Fort Worth, TX (rivalry)	L 12–13	23,000	
October 27		Baylor		Kyle Field; College Station, TX (rivalry)	W 19–13		
November 3		at Arkansas		Razorback Stadium; Fayetteville, AR (rivalry)	W 34–0	13,500	
November 10		SMU		Kyle Field; College Station, TX	W 3–0	10,000	
November 17		at Rice		Rice Field; Houston, TX	L 0–6	29,000	
November 29		No. 10 Texas		Kyle Field; College Station, TX (rivalry)	L 10–20	41,000	
*Non-conference game; Rankings from AP Poll released prior to the game; All times are in Central time

== Rankings ==
Ranking movements Legend: ██ Increase in ranking ██ Decrease in ranking — = Not ranked
	Week								
Poll	1	2	3	4	5	6	7	8	Final
AP	17	—	—	—	—	—	—	—	—
