= Lud Fiser =

American football and baseball player and coach (1908–1990)

Biographical details
- Born: October 26, 1908; Washington County, Kansas, U.S.
- Died: August 25, 1990 (aged 81); Manhattan, Kansas, U.S.

Playing career

Football
- 1929–1930: Kansas State

Baseball
- 1931–1931: Kansas State
- Position: Halfback (football)

Coaching career (HC unless noted)

Football
- 1942–1944: Manhattan HS (KS)
- 1945: Kansas State

Baseball
- 1947–1948: Kansas State

Head coaching record
- Overall: 1–7 (college football); 25–16 (college baseball)

Ladek C. "Lud" Fiser (October 26, 1908 – August 25, 1990) was an American football and baseball player and coach. He served as the head football coach at Kansas State University in 1945, compiling a record of 1–7. Fiser was also the head baseball coach at Kansas State in 1947 and 1948, tallying a mark of 25–16.

Fiser was a native of Mahaska, Kansas, and a 1931 graduate of Kansas State University, where he was a two-year letterman on the football, baseball and track teams.

Prior to taking the head football coaching job at Kansas State, Fiser was head coach for seven seasons for the high school football team in Atchison, Kansas, and then at Manhattan High School from 1942 to 1944. Under his guidance, Manhattan High posted an undefeated (9–0) season in 1943.

== Head coaching record ==
=== College football ===
Year	Team	Overall	Conference	Standing
Kansas State Wildcats (Big Six Conference) (1945)
1945	Kansas State	1–7	0–5	6th
Kansas State:		1–7	0–5	
Total:		1–7		
