= Oregon State–Washington State football rivalry =

American college football rivalry

- 2012 game at Reser Stadium

- Oregon State Beavers Washington State Cougars
- Sport: College football
- First meeting: November 11, 1903; Oregon Agricultural 6, Washington Agricultural 0
- Latest meeting: October 17, 2026; Oregon State 48, Washington State 30
- Next meeting: 2027
- Stadiums: Reser Stadium (Oregon State); Martin Stadium (Washington State)
- Trophy: "No Name Trophy" (2026-present (Note: The No Name Trophy is not officially contested but is presented to the winning team's alumni association.))

Statistics
- Total meetings: 112
- All-time series: Washington State leads, 58–51–3 (.531)
- Largest victory: Oregon State, 66–13 (2008)
- Longest win streak: Washington State, 10 (1983–1993); Oregon State, 6 (1966–1971)
- Current win streak: Oregon State, 1 (2026–present)

Location of campuses in the Northwest

The Oregon State–Washington State football rivalry is an American college football rivalry game played in the states of Oregon and Washington between the Oregon State Beavers in Corvallis and the Washington State Cougars in Pullman.

First played 123 years ago in 1903, the game is one of the most played rivalries in NCAA football, historically being part of the Northwest Championship. The two schools have historically been apart of the same conference, with them being members of the Pacific Coast Conference from 1916 to 1959, the Athletic Association of Western Universities from 1964 to 1968, the Pac-8 Conference from 1968 to 1978, the Pac-10 Conference from 1978 to 2011, the Pac-12 North Division from 2011 to 2021, and the Pac-12 Conference from 2011 onwards.

The individual matchup between the two schools gained national attention after 10 out of the 12 original teams in the Pac-12 moved to other NCAA conferences in 2024, leaving the two teams as the only ones still in the conference. The matchup has not been officially named yet, with suggestions including "The Land-Grant Rivalry", "The Cascade Cup", "The War on I-84", or "The Columbia River Rivalry".

Although the teams do not compete for a trophy on the field, the winning team's alumni association is given the "No Name Trophy", consisting of basalt and granite rock taken from the Columbia River, weighing more than 50 pounds. The concept of the trophy going to the winning team's alumni association is used by Oregon State in the Platypus Trophy.

Like many rivalry games, the game is played during the final week of the college football season, being played in that slot every year since 2025 following the collapse of the Pac-12.

== Series history ==
The rivalry was first played in 1903, and has been played 111 times through 2025. They have played each other in 1903, 1905, and annually since 1910, except for in 1918, 1925, 1926, 1943, 1944, 1987, 1997, 1998, 1999, and 2002. Oregon State and Washington State played each other twice in 1945 and in 2025. Washington State leads the series 58–51–3 (.531).

The game is usually played at either Reser Stadium in Corvallis or Martin Stadium in Pullman. However, nine games were played in Portland, Oregon, and the 2011 game was played at CenturyLink field in Seattle in an effort to increase revenue for the two teams.

Even though Washington State currently leads the series, Oregon State had several notable win streaks throughout its history. Oregon State won the first four games they played against each other from 1903 to 1911, before Washington State broke the streak by winning 10–9 in 1912.

Oregon State had two notable win streaks, from 1960 to 1964, and from 1966 to 1971 under coaches Tommy Prothro and Dee Andros. The only time that Washington State won between 1960 and 1971 was in 1965, where they won 10–8 in Corvallis.

Washington State's largest win streak was from 1983 to 1993 under coaches Jim Walden, Dennis Erickson, and Mike Price, where they won 10 consecutive games until Oregon State beat them 21–3 on November 12, 1994.

The 2023 Matchup, marred by rumors of conference realignment, and being jokingly dubbed the "Pac-2 Championship Game", was the first matchup in the rivalry's history in which both teams were ranked. The game was filled with pageantry, with the Washington State band playing the Oregon State fight song before the game. The Cougars would defeat the Beavers 38–35.

In 2024, Oregon State and Washington State became the only teams remaining in the Pac-12 Conference, leading to them being nicknamed the "Pac-2" by media outlets, to the point that a game between the two teams during the 2023 football season was jokingly dubbed the "Pac-2 Championship Game" by fans. The new attention to the game led to them forming a rivalry against each other. Ahead of the game that year, Washington State head coach Jake Dickert said "Oregon State’s not our buddy." and "It’s one of our biggest rivals now". Washington State would lose in upset fashion 41–38.

In 2025, due to scheduling constraints brought on by their "Pac-2" independent nature, Oregon State and Washington State played each other twice in the regular season, the third time in FBS history two teams played each other twice in the regular season. The teams split their matchups 1–1, though only the second meeting was considered a conference game, giving Washington State the Pac-12 title. Following Oregon State's win, Oregon State safety Jaheim Patterson was quoted as saying "They say it's a rivalry, but a rivalry is if you're winning and losing, but we've been winning every time." Following Washington State's win, Washington State quarterback Zevi Eckhaus responded "They had a lot of choice words for us the first time we played them," "I think last time, one of their players said this isn't a rivalry game, they keep winning. Well, we just won, so I guess this is a rivalry game. So to be able to go out there in a rivalry game, last game of the season, our home stadium... ...Yeah, it was big for us. It was huge."

In 2026, six new schools joined the Pac-12, marking the start of conference play in the new rebuilt league. Ahead of their first meeting in 2026, it was announced the winning teams alumni association would receive the "No Name Trophy", a 50 pound plus rock based trophy consisting of basalt and granite rock taken from the Columbia River.

== Game results ==
Oregon State victories	Washington State victories

No.	Date	Location	Winning team		Losing team	
1	November 11, 1903	Corvallis, OR	Oregon Agricultural	6	Washington Agricultural	0
2	October 21, 1905	Corvallis, OR	Oregon Agricultural	29	Washington State	0
3	October 29, 1910	Portland, OR	Oregon Agricultural	9	Washington State	3
4	November 11, 1911	Corvallis, OR	Oregon Agricultural	6	Washington State	0
5	November 1, 1912	Pullman, WA	Washington State	10	Oregon Agricultural	9
6	November 15, 1913	Corvallis, OR	Oregon Agricultural	10	Washington State	2
7	October 24, 1914	Pullman, WA	Oregon Agricultural	7	Washington State	0
8	October 16, 1915	Corvallis, OR	Washington State	29	Oregon Agricultural	0
9	October 14, 1916	Pullman, WA	Oregon Agricultural	13	Washington State	10
10	November 10, 1917	Corvallis, OR	Washington State	6	Oregon Agricultural	0
11	November 22, 1919	Portland, OR	Oregon Agricultural	6	Washington State	0
12	November 13, 1920	Pullman, WA	Washington State	28	Oregon Agricultural	0
13	November 12, 1921	Corvallis, OR	Washington State	7	Oregon Agricultural	3
14	November 25, 1922	Portland, OR	Oregon Agricultural	16	Washington State	0
15	November 17, 1923	Portland, OR	Tie	3	Tie	3
16	November 8, 1924	Pullman, WA	Oregon Agricultural	14	Washington State	13
17	October 29, 1927	Corvallis, OR	Oregon State	13	Washington State	6
18	October 20, 1928	Pullman, WA	Washington State	9	Oregon State	7
19	November 2, 1929	Portland, OR	Washington State	9	Oregon State	0
20	November 1, 1930	Portland, OR	Washington State	14	Oregon State	7
21	October 31, 1931	Portland, OR	Washington State	7	Oregon State	6
22	October 22, 1932	Corvallis, OR	Washington State	7	Oregon State	6
23	October 28, 1933	Corvallis, OR	Oregon State	2	Washington State	0
24	October 27, 1934	Pullman, WA	Washington State	31	Oregon State	0
25	October 26, 1935	Portland, OR	Washington State	26	Oregon State	13
26	November 7, 1936	Pullman, WA	Oregon State	16	Washington State	6
27	November 20, 1937	Corvallis, OR	Washington State	7	Oregon State	0
28	October 22, 1938	Portland, OR	Oregon State	7	Washington State	6
29	October 28, 1939	Corvallis, OR	Oregon State	13	Washington State	0
30	November 9, 1940	Corvallis, OR	Oregon State	21	Washington State	0
31	October 25, 1941	Pullman, WA	Washington State	7	Oregon State	0
32	October 24, 1942	Portland, OR	Washington State	26	Oregon State	13
33	October 6, 1945	Pullman, WA	Washington State	33	Oregon State	0
34	November 17, 1945	Corvallis, OR	Washington State	13	Oregon State	6
35	October 26, 1946	Pullman, WA	Oregon State	13	Washington State	12
36	November 15, 1947	Corvallis, OR	Washington State	14	Oregon State	13
37	November 6, 1948	Pullman, WA	Tie	26	Tie	26
38	October 29, 1949	Corvallis, OR	Oregon State	35	Washington State	6
39	November 18, 1950	Pullman, WA	Washington State	21	Oregon State	7
40	October 20, 1951	Corvallis, OR	Washington State	26	Oregon State	13
41	October 25, 1952	Pullman, WA	Washington State	33	Oregon State	20
42	November 14, 1953	Corvallis, OR	Oregon State	7	Washington State	0
43	October 9, 1954	Pullman, WA	Washington State	34	Oregon State	6
44	October 22, 1955	Corvallis, OR	Oregon State	14	Washington State	6
45	October 20, 1956	Pullman, WA	Oregon State	21	Washington State	6
46	November 2, 1957	Corvallis, OR	Oregon State	39	Washington State	25
47	November 8, 1958	Pullman, WA	Washington State	7	Oregon State	0
48	October 31, 1959	Corvallis, OR	Washington State	14	Oregon State	0
49	November 5, 1960	Pullman, WA	Oregon State	20	Washington State	10
50	November 4, 1961	Corvallis, OR	Oregon State	14	Washington State	6
51	November 3, 1962	Pullman, WA	Oregon State	18	Washington State	12
52	October 19, 1963	Corvallis, OR	Oregon State	30	Washington State	6
53	October 31, 1964	Pullman, WA	Oregon State	24	Washington State	7
54	October 30, 1965	Corvallis, OR	Washington State	10	Oregon State	8
55	October 29, 1966	Pullman, WA	Oregon State	41	Washington State	13
56	October 28, 1967	Corvallis, OR	Oregon State	35	Washington State	7
57	October 26, 1968	Pullman, WA	Oregon State	16	Washington State	8

No.	Date	Location	Winning team		Losing team	
58	November 15, 1969	Corvallis, OR	Oregon State	38	Washington State	3
59	November 14, 1970	Pullman, WA	Oregon State	28	Washington State	16
60	November 13, 1971	Corvallis, OR	Oregon State	21	Washington State	14
61	October 21, 1972	Pullman, WA	Washington State	37	Oregon State	7
62	November 10, 1973	Corvallis, OR	Washington State	13	Oregon State	7
63	November 9, 1974	Pullman, WA	Oregon State	17	Washington State	3
64	November 8, 1975	Corvallis, OR	Oregon State	7	Washington State	0
65	November 6, 1976	Pullman, WA	Washington State	29	Oregon State	24
66	November 5, 1977	Corvallis, OR	Washington State	24	Oregon State	10
67	November 4, 1978	Pullman, WA	Oregon State	32	Washington State	31
68	November 3, 1979	Corvallis, OR	Washington State	45	Oregon State	42
69	November 8, 1980	Pullman, WA	Washington State	28	Oregon State	7
70	October 10, 1981	Corvallis, OR	Washington State	23	Oregon State	0
71	October 9, 1982	Pullman, WA	Tie	14	Tie	14
72	November 5, 1983	Corvallis, OR	Washington State	27	Oregon State	9
73	November 3, 1984	Pullman, WA	Washington State	20	Oregon State	3
74	October 12, 1985	Corvallis, OR	Washington State	34	Oregon State	0
75	October 4, 1986	Pullman, WA	Washington State	24	Oregon State	14
76	November 12, 1988	Pullman, WA	Washington State	36	Oregon State	27
77	September 16, 1989	Pullman, WA	Washington State	41	Oregon State	3
78	October 20, 1990	Corvallis, OR	Washington State	55	Oregon State	24
79	October 5, 1991	Pullman, WA	Washington State	55	Oregon State	7
80	October 10, 1992	Corvallis, OR	Washington State	35	Oregon State	10
81	September 17, 1993	Pullman, WA	Washington State	51	Oregon State	6
82	November 12, 1994	Corvallis, OR	Oregon State	21	Washington State	3
83	October 7, 1995	Pullman, WA	Washington State	40	Oregon State	14
84	October 12, 1996	Corvallis, OR	Washington State	24	Oregon State	3
85	October 30, 1999	Pullman, WA	Oregon State	27	Washington State	13
86	October 28, 2000	Corvallis, OR	Oregon State	38	Washington State	9
87	October 6, 2001	Pullman, WA	Washington State	34	Oregon State	27
88	October 25, 2003	Pullman, WA	Washington State	36	Oregon State	30
89	October 23, 2004	Corvallis, OR	Oregon State	38	Washington State	19
90	October 1, 2005	Corvallis, OR	Oregon State	44	Washington State	33
91	October 7, 2006	Corvallis, OR	Washington State	13	Oregon State	6
92	November 17, 2007	Pullman, WA	Oregon State	52	Washington State	17
93	October 11, 2008	Corvallis, OR	Oregon State	66	Washington State	13
94	November 21, 2009	Pullman, WA	Oregon State	42	Washington State	10
95	November 13, 2010	Corvallis, OR	Washington State	31	Oregon State	14
96	October 22, 2011	Seattle, WA	Oregon State	44	Washington State	21
97	October 6, 2012	Corvallis, OR	Oregon State	19	Washington State	6
98	October 12, 2013	Pullman, WA	Oregon State	52	Washington State	24
99	November 8, 2014	Corvallis, OR	Washington State	39	Oregon State	32
100	October 17, 2015	Pullman, WA	Washington State	52	Oregon State	31
101	October 29, 2016	Corvallis, OR	Washington State	35	Oregon State	31
102	September 16, 2017	Pullman, WA	Washington State	52	Oregon State	23
103	October 6, 2018	Corvallis, OR	Washington State	56	Oregon State	37
104	November 23, 2019	Pullman, WA	Washington State	54	Oregon State	53
105	November 7, 2020	Corvallis, OR	Washington State	38	Oregon State	28
106	October 9, 2021	Pullman, WA	Washington State	31	Oregon State	24
107	October 15, 2022	Corvallis, OR	Oregon State	24	Washington State	10
108	September 23, 2023	Pullman, WA	Washington State	38	Oregon State	35
109	November 23, 2024	Corvallis, OR	Oregon State	41	Washington State	38
110	November 1, 2025	Corvallis, OR	Oregon State	10	Washington State	7
111	November 29, 2025	Pullman, WA	Washington State	32	Oregon State	8
112	October 17, 2026	Corvallis, OR	Oregon State	48	Washington State	30
Series: Washington State leads 58–51–3

== Coaching records ==
=== Oregon State ===
Head coach	Team	Games	Seasons	Wins	Losses	Ties	Pct.
JaMarcus Shephard	Oregon State	1	2026	1	0		1.000
Robb Akey	Oregon State	2	2025	1	1		.500
Trent Bray	Oregon State	1	2024	1	0		1.000
Jonathan Smith	Oregon State	6	2018–23	1	5		.167
Gary Andersen	Oregon State	3	2015–17	0	3		.000
Mike Riley	Oregon State	12	2003–14	8	4		.667
Dennis Erickson	Oregon State	2	2000–01	1	1		.500
Jerry Pettibone	Oregon State	6	1991–96	1	5		.167
Dave Kragthorpe	Oregon State	5	1985–90	0	5		.000
Joe Avezzano	Oregon State	5	1980–84	0	4	1	.100
Craig Fertig	Oregon State	4	1976–79	1	3		.250
Dee Andros	Oregon State	11	1965–75	8	3		.727
Tommy Prothro	Oregon State	10	1955–64	8	2		.800
Kip Taylor	Oregon State	6	1949–54	2	4		.333
Lon Stiner	Oregon State	15	1933–48	6	8	1	.433
Paul Schissler	Oregon State	6	1927–32	2	4		.333

=== Washington State ===
Head coach	Team	Games	Seasons	Wins	Losses	Ties	Pct.
Kirby Moore	Washington State	1	2026	0	1		.000
Jimmy Rogers	Washington State	2	2025	1	1		.500
Jake Dickert	Washington State	3	2022–24	1	2		.333
Nick Rolovich	Washington State	2	2020–21	2	0		1.000
Mike Leach	Washington State	8	2012–19	6	2		.750
Paul Wulff	Washington State	4	2008–11	1	3		.250
Bill Doba	Washington State	5	2003–07	2	3		.400
Mike Price	Washington State	10	1989–2001	8	2		.800
Dennis Erickson	Washington State	1	1988	1	0		1.000
Jim Walden	Washington State	9	1978–86	7	1	1	.833
Warren Powers	Washington State	1	1977	1	0		1.000
Jackie Sherrill	Washington State	1	1976	1	0		1.000
Jim Sweeney	Washington State	8	1968–75	2	6		.250
Bert Clark	Washington State	4	1964–67	1	3		.250
Jim Sutherland	Washington State	8	1956–63	2	6		.250
Alton Kircher	Washington State	4	1952–55	2	2		.500
Forest Evashevski	Washington State	2	1950–51	2	0		1.000
Phil Sarboe	Washington State	6	1945–49	3	2	1	.583
O. E. Hollingbery	Washington State	16	1927–42	10	6		.625

== See also ==
- Northwest Championship
- List of NCAA college football rivalry games
- List of most-played college football series in NCAA Division I
