= 1946 Cotton Bowl Classic =

- 10th Cotton Bowl Classic
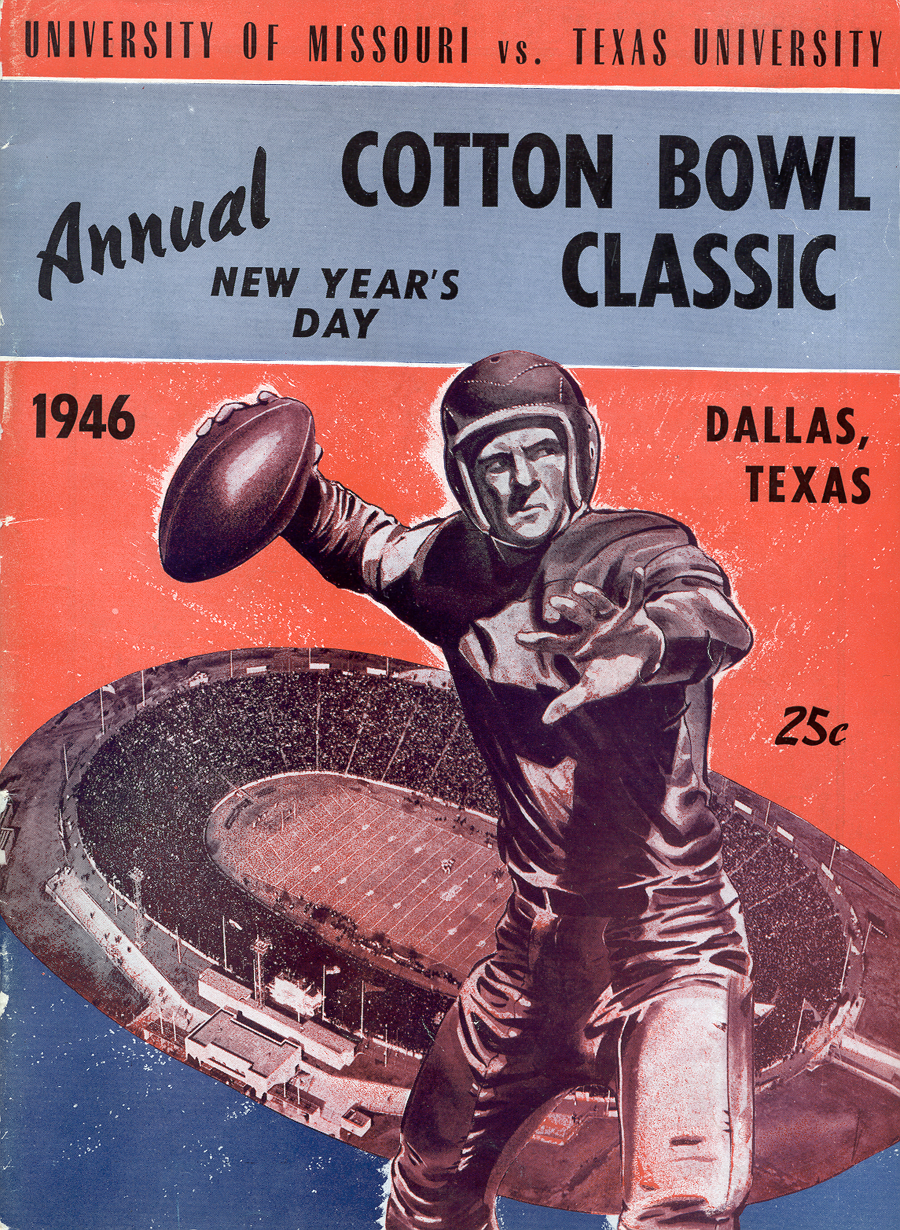
Texas Longhorns	Missouri Tigers
(9–1)	(6–3)
SWC	Big 6
40	27
Head coach: Dana X. Bible	Head coach: Chauncey Simpson
AP 10
	1	2	3	4	Total
Texas	14	7	6	13	40
Missouri	7	7	0	13	27
- Date: January 1, 1946
- Season: 1945
- Stadium: Cotton Bowl
- Location: Dallas, Texas
- MVP: Back Bobby Layne (Texas); End Hub Bechtol (Texas); Tackle Jim Kekeris (Missouri)
- Attendance: 46,000

The Cotton Bowl in Dallas, Texas, hosted the Cotton Bowl Classic.

The 1946 Cotton Bowl Classic was a postseason college football bowl game between the tenth ranked Texas Longhorns and the Missouri Tigers.

== Background ==
Texas was led by star quarterback, Bobby Layne.

== Game summary ==
Layne accounted for all 40 of Texas' points. He rushed for three touchdowns, passed for two touchdowns (both caught by Joe Baumgardner) and caught a touchdown pass from Ralph Ellsworth. Texas led the whole game, from 14-7 at the end of the first, 21-14 at halftime and 27-14 at the end of the third quarter. Missouri had three touchdown runs from William Dellastatious, Howard Bennett, and Robert Hopkins with a touchdown catch from Roland Oakes, but the Tigers could not stop Layne, who went 11 of 12 for 158 yards.

== Statistics ==
Statistics	Missouri	Texas
First downs	22	19
Yards rushing	408	202
Yards passing	106	234
Total yards	514	436
Punts-Average	2-37.0	2-41.5
Fumbles lost	1	1
Penalties-Yards	4-30	5-35
