= 1945 Kansas State Wildcats football team =

American college football season

1945 Kansas State Wildcats football
- Conference: Big Six Conference
- Record: 1–7 (0–5 Big 6)
- Head coach: Lud Fiser (1st season)
- Home stadium: Memorial Stadium

1945 Big Six Conference football standings
	Conf.					Overall
Team	W		L		T	W		L		T
Missouri $	5	–	0	–	0	6	–	4	–	0
Oklahoma	4	–	1	–	0	5	–	5	–	0
Iowa State	2	–	2	–	1	4	–	3	–	1
Nebraska	2	–	3	–	0	4	–	5	–	0
Kansas	1	–	3	–	1	4	–	5	–	1
Kansas State	0	–	5	–	0	1	–	7	–	0
$ – Conference champion

The 1945 Kansas State Wildcats football team represented Kansas State University in the 1945 college football season. The team's head football coach was Lud Fiser, in his first and only year at the helm of the Wildcats. The Wildcats played their home games in Memorial Stadium. The Wildcats finished the season with a 1–7 record with a 0–5 record in conference play. They finished in last place in the Big Six Conference. The Wildcats scored 71 points and gave up 268 points.

== Schedule ==
Date	Opponent	Site	Result	Attendance	Source
September 29	Wichita*	Memorial Stadium; Manhattan, KS	W 13–6		
October 6	Olathe NAS*	Memorial Stadium; Manhattan, KS	L 12–34		
October 13	at Marquette*	Marquette Stadium; Milwaukee, WI	L 13–55	9,000	
October 20	at Missouri	Memorial Stadium; Columbia, MO	L 7–41	8,500	
October 27	Oklahoma	Memorial Stadium; Manhattan, KS	L 13–41	8,000	
November 3	at Iowa State	Clyde Williams Field; Ames, IA (rivalry)	L 13–40	5,572	
November 10	Nebraska^{†}	Memorial Stadium; Manhattan, KS (rivalry)	L 0–24	11,000	
November 17	at Kansas^{†}	Memorial Stadium; Lawrence, KS (rivalry)	L 0–27	15,700	
*Non-conference game; ^{†}Homecoming
