= List of most-played college football series in NCAA Division I =

This is a list of the most-played college football series in NCAA Division I. The Lafayette–Lehigh rivalry, known as "The Rivalry," is the most-played in Division I at 161 games. Lehigh and Lafayette are members of the Football Championship Subdivision (FCS). The most-played Football Bowl Subdivision (FBS) series is the Minnesota–Wisconsin football rivalry, at 134 games. In some cases, during the early years of college football when distant travel was prohibitive, these teams played each other more than once per year.

Series listed here are not necessarily continuous series, and several of the series listed below were ended (or interrupted) by either the World Wars, the 2010–2014 NCAA conference realignment, the COVID-19 pandemic, or the 2021–2026 NCAA conference realignment. It also includes several games that are not considered notable rivalries, but are between teams that, mainly due to conference alignment, have been played 100 or more times. Conference affiliation is not necessarily an impediment to playing an annual game, and this list features match-ups of teams that have rarely or never shared an athletic conference.

This table is for listing all NCAA Division I football series with at least 100 games played. Wins and losses are given respective to the team leading the series.

== Games ==
- Updated through November 21, 2026
- The "V" column indicates vacated victories to make sure all the games are documented in the list - W+L+T+V=Total. A note documenting each vacated game is included in the "V" column. Vacated victories are different than forfeited victories. In recent years, the NCAA has used the vacating procedure instead of requiring forfeitures when teams are penalized for violating NCAA rules. NCAA procedures require that the winning team adjust its record to remove a win that is vacated. However, the losing team is not allowed to reduce the number of losses on its record. This means that the win–loss–tie records for some series will not add up to the total number of games without adding the vacated games in the V column. Confounding this problem is that the NCAA's official record of the most played rivalries, does not reflect the vacated games. Also, to be officially correct, the two media guides of the teams will not match since the team that lost a vacated game is not allowed to reduce the number of losses.

| Games | Series leader | Opponent | Rivalry or trophy name | Conference | W | L | T | V | First game | Last game | Notes | Source | Next game |
|---|---|---|---|---|---|---|---|---|---|---|---|---|---|
| 162 | Lafayette | Lehigh | The Rivalry | Patriot | 82 | 75 | 5 | | 1884 | 2026 | | | Nov 20, 2027 |
| 148 | Yale | Princeton | Rivalry | Ivy | 83 | 55 | 10 | | 1873 | 2026 | (Note: Most-played rivalry within the Ivy League.) | | Nov 13, 2027 |
| 142 | Yale | Harvard | The Game | Ivy | 73 | 61 | 8 | | 1875 | 2026 | | | Nov 20, 2027 |
| 137 | Richmond | William & Mary | Capital Cup | Patriot | 68 | 64 | 5 | | 1898 | 2026 | | | Nov 20, 2027 |
| 135 | Minnesota | Wisconsin | Paul Bunyan's Axe | Big Ten | 64 | 63 | 8 | | 1890 | 2025 | (Note: Most-played rivalry within the Big Ten Conference.) (Note: Became the longest uninterrupted series in FBS history in 2012 – continuous since 1907 – supplanting the Kansas–Nebraska series.) (Note: If "uninterrupted" is interpreted as having been played in every calendar year, this became the longest uninterrupted series in all college football history in 2020 – continuous since 1907 – supplanting the Lafayette–Lehigh series. However, the Lafayette–Lehigh series has been played in each football season since 1897, with both schools' home conference of the Patriot League having moved its fall 2020 season to spring 2021.) | | Nov 28, 2026 |
| 132 | Penn | Cornell | Trustees' Cup | Ivy | 79 | 48 | 5 | | 1893 | 2026 | (Note: The 1997 game was forfeited by Penn, giving a win to Cornell.) | | Nov 6, 2027 |
| 131 | Georgia | Auburn | Deep South's Oldest Rivalry | SEC | 66 | 57 | 8 | | 1892 | 2026 | (Note: Most-played rivalry within the Southeastern Conference.) | | 2027 |
| 131 | North Carolina | Virginia | South's Oldest Rivalry | ACC | 66 | 61 | 4 | | 1892 | 2026 | (Note: Most-played rivalry within the Atlantic Coast Conference.) (Note: Disputed series record: North Carolina forfeited their win in 1956 (or 1957) but there was no NCAA sanction.) | | 2027 |
| 130 | Yale | Brown | | Ivy | 89 | 36 | 5 | | 1880 | 2026 | | | Nov 6, 2027 |
| 129 | Harvard | Dartmouth | Rivalry | Ivy | 75 | 49 | 5 | | 1882 | 2026 | | | Oct 30, 2027 |
| 129 | Stanford | California | Big Game (Battle for the Axe) | ACC | 67 | 51 | 11 | | 1892 | 2026 | | | Nov 20, 2027 |
| 129 | Oregon | Oregon State | Rivalry (Northwest Championship) (Note: Rivalry includes more than the 2 teams listed - see the linked article for further information.) | Non-conf. (Note: Formerly an in-conference rivalry.) | 70 | 49 | 10 | | 1894 | 2025 | (Note: Most-played rivalry that is currently non-conference.) | | Sep 16, 2028 |
| 129 | Cincinnati | Miami (OH) | Victory Bell | Non-conf. | 62 | 60 | 7 | | 1888 | 2026 | (Note: No future games are scheduled.) | | None |
| 127 | Purdue | Indiana | Old Oaken Bucket | Big Ten | 77 | 44 | 6 | | 1891 | 2025 | | | Nov 28, 2026 |
| 126 | Navy | Army | Army–Navy Game (Commander-in-Chief's Trophy) | American (Note: Despite both Army and Navy being part of the American Conference, their rivalry remains a non-conference game played after conference championship weekend) | 64 | 55 | 7 | | 1890 | 2025 | (Note: Most-played rivalry between FBS teams outside the power conferences.) | | Dec 12, 2026 |
| 126 | Montana | Montana State | Great Divide Trophy | Big Sky | 74 | 46 | 5 | 1 | 1897 | 2026 | (Note: Montana vacated its last five wins of the 2011 season due to NCAA violations. This included a regular season win over Montana State.) | | Nov 20, 2027 |
| 125 | Harvard | Brown | | Ivy | 92 | 31 | 2 | | 1893 | 2026 | | | Sep 25, 2027 |
| 124 | Kansas | Kansas State | Sunflower Showdown | Big 12 | 64 | 55 | 5 | | 1902 | 2026 | (Note: Most-played rivalry within the Big 12 Conference.) (Note: Disputed series record: Kansas State claims Kansas leads the series lead 64–55–5, based on a game that the Big Eight conference ruled Kansas had to vacate in 1980. Kansas claims a very narrow interpretation of NCAA statistical guidelines that don't reference games that conference committees vacate. The NCAA did not act on the 1980 vacated win ruling. Kansas claims they lead the series 65–54–5.) | | 2027 |
| 122 | Clemson | South Carolina | Palmetto Bowl | Non-conf. | 74 | 44 | 4 | | 1896 | 2025 | | | Nov 28, 2026 |
| 122 | Ole Miss | Mississippi State | Egg Bowl | SEC | 67 | 46 | 6 | 3 | 1901 | 2025 | (Note: This series includes the following adjustments: 1976 & 1977 games were forfeited by Mississippi State, 2012 & 2014 games were vacated by Ole Miss, and 2018 game was vacated by Mississippi State.) | | Nov 27, 2026 |
| 122 | Tennessee | Kentucky | Rivalry | SEC | 86 | 26 | 9 | 1 | 1893 | 2026 | (Note: Tennessee vacated all its wins from the 2019 and 2020 seasons due to NCAA violations.) | | 2027 |
| 122 | Missouri | Kansas | Border War | Non-conf. | 59 | 54 | 9 | | 1891 | 2026 | (Note: Kansas forfeited 1960 win.) | | Sep 6, 2031 |
| 122 | TCU | Baylor | The Revivalry | Big 12 | 61 | 54 | 7 | | 1899 | 2026 | | | 2027 |
| 122 | Texas | Oklahoma | Red River Rivalry | SEC | 65 | 52 | 5 | | 1900 | 2026 | | | Oct 9, 2027 |
| 121 | Michigan | Ohio State | The Game | Big Ten | 62 | 52 | 6 | 1 | 1897 | 2025 | (Note: Ohio State vacated all of its wins during the 2010 season due to NCAA violations. This included a win over Michigan.) | | Nov 28, 2026 |
| 120 | Tennessee | Vanderbilt | Rivalry | SEC | 79 | 33 | 5 | 2 | 1892 | 2025 | (Note: Disputed series record: Vanderbilt records show that Tennessee has 79–33–5 series lead due, including Vanderbilt's 1918 victory. Tennessee records do not count games played in 1918 since the team was "unofficial [team] formed from Army West Point recruits and students.") (Note: Tennessee vacated all its wins from the 2019 and 2020 seasons due to NCAA violations.) | | Nov 28, 2026 |
| 120 | Texas | Texas A&M | Lone Star Showdown | SEC | 78 | 37 | 5 | | 1894 | 2025 | | | Nov 27, 2026 |
| 120 | Minnesota | Iowa | Floyd of Rosedale | Big Ten | 64 | 54 | 2 | | 1891 | 2026 | | | 2027 |
| 120 | NC State | Wake Forest | Rivalry (Tobacco Road) | ACC | 70 | 44 | 6 | | 1895 | 2026 | | | 2027 |
| 119 | Illinois | Northwestern | Land of Lincoln Trophy | Big Ten | 59 | 55 | 5 | | 1892 | 2025 | | | Nov 28, 2026 |
| 119 | Georgia | Georgia Tech | Clean, Old-Fashioned Hate | Non-conf. | 73 | 41 | 5 | | 1893 | 2025 | | | Nov 28, 2026 |
| 119 | South Dakota State | South Dakota | South Dakota Showdown Series | MVFC | 59 | 53 | 7 | | 1889 | 2026 | | | 2027 |
| 119 | Michigan | Michigan State | Paul Bunyan Trophy | Big Ten | 75 | 39 | 5 | | 1898 | 2026 | | | 2027 |
| 118 | North Dakota | North Dakota State | Nickel Trophy | Non-conf. | 63 | 52 | 3 | | 1894 | 2025 | | | None |
| 118 | Washington | Oregon | Cascade Clash (Northwest Championship) | Big Ten | 63 | 50 | 5 | | 1900 | 2025 | | | Nov 28, 2026 |
| 118 | Princeton | Harvard | Rivalry | Ivy | 60 | 51 | 7 | | 1877 | 2026 | | | Sep 11, 2027 |
| 118 | Washington | Washington State | Apple Cup (Northwest Championship) | Non-conf. | 78 | 34 | 6 | | 1900 | 2026 | | | Aug 28, 2027 |
| 118 | LSU | Mississippi State | Rivalry | SEC | 76 | 36 | 3 | 3 | 1896 | 2026 | (Note: This series includes the following adjustments: 1975 & 1976 games were forfeited by Mississippi State, and 2012, 2013 & 2015 games were vacated by LSU.) | | 2028 |
| 118 | Colorado State | Wyoming | Border War | Non-conf. | 61 | 52 | 5 | | 1899 | 2026 | (Note: Most-played conference rivalry between FBS teams outside the power conferences.) (Note: Colorado State treats the 1899 game, which it later forfeited after a 12–0 victory, like a vacated game, and removes one victory from its win column, while not increasing the number of wins it credits to Wyoming.) | | Sep 23, 2028 |
| 118 | North Dakota State | South Dakota State | Dakota Marker | Non-conf. | 66 | 47 | 5 | | 1903 | 2025 | | | None |
| 118 | Oklahoma | Oklahoma State | Bedlam Series | Non-conf. | 91 | 20 | 7 | | 1904 | 2023 | (Note: Some sources claim that Oklahoma forfeited the 1972 game. OU Forfeit 8 games in 1972 This is not included in the NCAA source.) | | None |
| 117 | Princeton | Penn | Rivalry | Ivy | 71 | 45 | 1 | | 1876 | 2026 | (Note: The 1997 game was forfeited by Penn, giving a win to Princeton.) | | Nov 20, 2027 |
| 117 | Nebraska | Kansas | Rivalry | Non-conf. | 91 | 23 | 3 | | 1892 | 2010 | | | None |
| 116 | New Mexico | New Mexico State | Battle of I-25 (Rio Grande Rivalry) | Non-conf. | 76 | 35 | 5 | | 1894 | 2026 | | | Sep 25, 2027 |
| 116 | New Hampshire | Maine | Battle for the Brice–Cowell Musket | CAA | 62 | 46 | 8 | | 1903 | 2026 | | | Nov 20, 2027 |
| 115 | North Carolina | NC State | Rivalry (Tobacco Road) | ACC | 68 | 41 | 6 | | 1894 | 2025 | | | Nov 28, 2026 |
| 115 | LSU | Ole Miss | Magnolia Bowl | SEC | 64 | 44 | 4 | 3 | 1894 | 2026 | (Note: 2013 win by Ole Miss vacated and 2012 and 2014 wins by LSU vacated.) | | 2027 |
| 114 | Oklahoma | Kansas | | Non-conf. | 80 | 28 | 6 | | 1903 | 2023 | | | None |
| 114 | Utah | Utah State | Battle of the Brothers (Beehive Boot) | Non-conf. | 81 | 29 | 4 | | 1892 | 2026 | | | Sep 14, 2030 |
| 114 | Illinois State | Eastern Illinois | Mid-America Classic | Non-conf. | 62 | 43 | 9 | | 1901 | 2026 | | | Sep 18, 2027 |
| 113 | North Carolina | Duke | Victory Bell (Tobacco Road) | ACC | 66 | 42 | 4 | 2 | 1888 | 2026 | (Note: Both schools claim to have won their 1889 game by forfeit, but most neutral recordkeepers list a win for North Carolina. Duke media information still counts the game as a win. North Carolina vacated their wins in the 2008 and 2009 due to the 2010 football scandal.) | | 2027 |
| 113 | Cornell | Columbia | Empire State Bowl | Ivy | 66 | 44 | 3 | | 1889 | 2026 | | | Nov 20, 2027 |
| 113 | Texas | Baylor | Rivalry | Non-conf. | 81 | 28 | 4 | | 1901 | 2023 | (Note: Baylor forfeited their tied game in 1910, giving a win to Texas.) | | None |
| 112 | North Carolina | Wake Forest | Rivalry (Tobacco Road) | ACC | 73 | 37 | 2 | | 1888 | 2025 | | | 2027 |
| 112 | Washington State | Oregon State | Rivalry (Northwest Championship) | Pac-12 | 58 | 51 | 3 | | 1903 | 2026 | | | 2027 |
| 112 | USC | California | Rivalry | Non-conf. | 72 | 32 | 6 | 2 | 1915 | 2023 | (Note: California vacated their 1999 win for use of ineligible players. USC vacated their 2005 win after the Reggie Bush scandal.) | | None |
| 110 | Brown | Rhode Island | Rivalry | Non-conf. | 74 | 34 | 2 | | 1909 | 2026 | | | Oct 9, 2027 |
| 109 | Iowa State | Kansas State | Farmageddon | Big 12 | 55 | 50 | 4 | | 1917 | 2025 | | | Nov 28, 2026 |
| 109 | Yale | Dartmouth | | Ivy | 57 | 46 | 6 | | 1884 | 2026 | | | Oct 9, 2027 |
| 109 | Alabama | Mississippi State | Battle for Highway 82 | SEC | 87 | 18 | 3 | 1 | 1896 | 2026 | (Note: This series includes the following adjustments: 1993 game forfeited by Alabama, and 2005 game vacated by Alabama.) | (Note: Mississippi State has an extra loss in its "versus all opponents" section compared to the record shown in this list.) | 2027 |
| 109 | Alabama | Tennessee | Third Saturday in October | SEC | 60 | 41 | 7 | 1 | 1901 | 2026 | (Note: Alabama vacated its 2005 win against Tennessee, meaning a win is deducted from Alabama total. Alabama also forfeited its 1993 tie, which changes that game from a tie to a win for Tennessee.) | | Oct 16, 2027 |
| 109 | Dartmouth | Cornell | Rivalry | Ivy | 64 | 44 | 1 | | 1900 | 2026 | | | Nov 13, 2027 |
| 108 | Princeton | Cornell | | Ivy | 67 | 39 | 2 | | 1891 | 2026 | | | Oct 30, 2027 |
| 108 | Illinois State | Western Illinois | | Non-conf. | 53 | 52 | 3 | | 1904 | 2026 | | | None |
| 108 | Pittsburgh | West Virginia | Backyard Brawl | Non-conf. | 63 | 42 | 3 | | 1895 | 2025 | | | Sep 8, 2029 |
| 108 | Texas A&M | Baylor | Battle of the Brazos | Non-conf. | 68 | 31 | 9 | | 1899 | 2011 | | | None |
| 108 | Washington | Oregon State | Northwest Championship | Non-conf. | 69 | 35 | 4 | | 1897 | 2023 | | | None |
| 107 | Michigan | Minnesota | Little Brown Jug | Big Ten | 78 | 26 | 3 | | 1892 | 2026 | | | TBD |
| 107 | Colgate | Cornell | Rivalry | Non-conf. | 53 | 51 | 3 | | 1896 | 2026 | | | 2027 |
| 106 | Virginia Tech | Virginia | Commonwealth Cup | ACC | 62 | 39 | 5 | | 1895 | 2025 | | | Nov 28, 2026 |
| 106 | Furman | The Citadel | Rivalry | Southern | 66 | 37 | 3 | | 1913 | 2026 | | | 2027 |
| 106 | Wisconsin | Northwestern | | Big Ten | 63 | 38 | 5 | | 1890 | 2024 | | | 2027 |
| 105 | Duke | Wake Forest | Rivalry (Tobacco Road) | ACC | 62 | 41 | 2 | | 1896 | 2025 | | | Nov 28, 2026 |
| 105 | Dartmouth | Princeton | | Ivy | 54 | 47 | 4 | | 1897 | 2026 | | | Nov 6, 2027 |
| 105 | Ohio State | Illinois | Battle for Illibuck | Big Ten | 70 | 30 | 4 | 1 | 1902 | 2026 | (Note: Ohio State vacated all of its wins during the 2010 season due to NCAA violations. This included a win over Illinois.) | | 2028 |
| 105 | Kansas | Iowa State | | Big 12 | 53 | 46 | 6 | | 1896 | 2025 | | | 2027 |
| 105 | Penn | Columbia | | Ivy | 78 | 26 | 1 | | 1878 | 2026 | | | Oct 16, 2027 |
| 105 | Nebraska | Iowa State | Rivalry | Non-conf. | 86 | 17 | 2 | | 1896 | 2010 | (Note: The schools differ on the series record. Iowa State's media guide has a 1907 victory over Nebraska on November 2, 1907, but the Chicago Tribune and Des Moines Register both cite a 10–9 Nebraska victory.) | | None |
| 104 | Yale | Columbia | | Ivy | 79 | 23 | 2 | | 1872 | 2026 | | | Oct 30, 2027 |
| 104 | Lafayette | Bucknell | | Patriot | 59 | 39 | 6 | | 1883 | 2026 | | | 2027 |
| 104 | Utah | BYU | Holy War (Beehive Boot) | Big 12 | 63 | 37 | 4 | | 1896 | 2026 | (Note: Disputed series record: BYU does not recognize 6 games played before 1922 (3 wins for each school).) | | 2027 |
| 104 | Central Michigan | Eastern Michigan | Rivalry | MAC | 66 | 32 | 6 | | 1902 | 2026 | | | 2027 |
| 104 | North Dakota | South Dakota | Sitting Bull Trophy | MVFC | 64 | 35 | 5 | | 1903 | 2026 | | | 2027 |
| 104 | Maine | Rhode Island | | CAA | 62 | 39 | 3 | | 1911 | 2026 | | | 2027 |
| 104 | Georgia | Florida | Rivalry | SEC | 58 | 44 | 2 | | 1915 | 2026 | (Note: Georgia recognizes a 1904 game as its first game against Florida, thus according to Georgia there have been 105 games of which Georgia has won 59.) | | Oct 30, 2027 |
| 104 | Missouri | Iowa State | Telephone Trophy | Non-conf. | 61 | 34 | 9 | | 1896 | 2011 | | | None |
| 104 | Nebraska | Missouri | Victory Bell | Non-conf. | 65 | 36 | 3 | | 1892 | 2010 | | | None |
| 104 | TCU | SMU | Battle for the Iron Skillet | Non-conf. | 54 | 43 | 7 | | 1915 | 2025 | | | None |
| 103 | Dartmouth | Brown | | Ivy | 66 | 33 | 4 | | 1894 | 2026 | | | Nov 20, 2027 |
| 103 | Miami (OH) | Ohio | Battle of the Bricks | MAC | 57 | 44 | 2 | | 1908 | 2026 | | | 2027 |
| 103 | USC | Stanford | Rivalry | Non-conf. | 65 | 34 | 3 | 1 | 1905 | 2023 | (Note: USC vacated their 2005 win after the Reggie Bush scandal.) | | None |
| 103 | Oklahoma | Kansas State | | Non-conf. | 77 | 22 | 4 | | 1908 | 2022 | | | None |
| 102 | Purdue | Illinois | Battle for the Purdue Cannon | Big Ten | 49 | 47 | 6 | | 1890 | 2026 | | | 2027 |
| 102 | UTEP | New Mexico State | Battle of I-10 | Non-conf. | 60 | 40 | 2 | | 1902 | 2025 | | | None |
| 102 | Washington | California | | Non-conf. | 57 | 41 | 4 | | 1904 | 2023 | | (Note: Washington 2023 media guide documents 102 games, but the number of wins doesn't match the number of games documented.) | None |
| 101 | Hampton | Howard | The Real HU | Non-conf. | 55 | 45 | 1 | | 1908 | 2026 | (Note: Most-played rivalry between two HBCU's) (Note: 1908 game forfeited by Hampton, giving win to Howard.) | | TBD |
| 101 | Oregon | Washington State | Northwest Championship | Non-conf. | 52 | 42 | 7 | | 1901 | 2023 | (Note: The 1978 and 1979 games were both forfeited by Oregon, giving two wins for Washington State.) | | None |
| 100 | Furman | Wofford | Rivalry | Southern | 56 | 37 | 7 | | 1889 | 2026 | | | 2027 |
| 100 | Iowa | Wisconsin | Rivalry | Big Ten | 49 | 49 | 2 | | 1894 | 2026 | | | 2027 |
| 100 | Ohio State | Indiana | | Big Ten | 81 | 13 | 5 | 1 | 1901 | 2026 | (Note: Ohio State vacated all of its wins during the 2010 season due to NCAA violations. This included a win over Indiana.) | | TBD |
| 100 | Penn State | Pittsburgh | The Keystone Classic | Non-conf. | 53 | 43 | 4 | | 1893 | 2019 | | | None |
| 100 | New Hampshire | Rhode Island | | CAA | 62 | 33 | 5 | | 1905 | 2026 | | | 2027 |
| 100 | Minnesota | Northwestern | | Big Ten | 57 | 38 | 5 | | 1892 | 2026 | | | TBD |

== See also ==
- List of NCAA college football rivalry games
