= 1945 Nebraska Cornhuskers football team =

American college football season

1945 Nebraska Cornhuskers football
- Conference: Big Six Conference
- Record: 4–5 (2–3 Big 6)
- Head coach: George Clark (1st season)
- Offensive scheme: T formation
- Home stadium: Memorial Stadium

1945 Big Six Conference football standings
	Conf.					Overall
Team	W		L		T	W		L		T
Missouri $	5	–	0	–	0	6	–	4	–	0
Oklahoma	4	–	1	–	0	5	–	5	–	0
Iowa State	2	–	2	–	1	4	–	3	–	1
Nebraska	2	–	3	–	0	4	–	5	–	0
Kansas	1	–	3	–	1	4	–	5	–	1
Kansas State	0	–	5	–	0	1	–	7	–	0
$ – Conference champion

The 1945 Nebraska Cornhuskers football team represented the University of Nebraska as a member of the Big Six Conference during the 1945 college football season. Led by first-year head coach George Clark, the Cornhuskers compiled an overall record of 4–5 with a mark of 2–3 in conference play, placing fourth in the Big 6. Nebraska played home games at Memorial Stadium in Lincoln, Nebraska.

== Schedule ==
Date	Time	Opponent	Site	Result	Attendance	Source
September 29	2:00 p.m.	Oklahoma	Memorial Stadium; Lincoln, NE (rivalry)	L 0–20	17,000	
October 6	2:00 p.m.	Minnesota*	Memorial Stadium; Lincoln, NE (rivalry)	L 7–61		
October 13	2:00 p.m.	at No. 8 Indiana*	Memorial Stadium; Bloomington, IN	L 14–54		
October 20	2:00 p.m.	at Iowa State	Clyde Williams Field; Ames, IA (rivalry)	L 7–27	11,669	
October 27	2:00 p.m.	at Missouri	Memorial Stadium; Columbia, MO (rivalry)	L 0–19		
November 3	2:00 p.m.	Kansas^{†}	Memorial Stadium; Lincoln, NE (rivalry)	W 27–13	15,000	
November 10	2:00 p.m.	at Kansas State	Memorial Stadium; Manhattan, KS (rivalry)	W 24–0	11,000	
November 17	2:00 p.m.	South Dakota*	Memorial Stadium; Lincoln, NE	W 53–0		
November 24	2:00 p.m.	Iowa*	Memorial Stadium; Lincoln, NE (rivalry)	W 13–6		
*Non-conference game; ^{†}Homecoming; All times are in Central time

== Before the season ==
Head coach Clark arrived, hired by athletic director Adolph J. Lewandowski as his own replacement in charge of the football program, and with him came a completely new staff of five assistants. George "Potsy" Clark's playing and coaching career stretched back to 1912, included both college and professional teams, and by the time he arrived at Nebraska he had also served in both world wars, once in the Army and then later in the Navy Reserve. Coach Clark was exactly the kind of leader that Nebraska hoped could bring the troubled football program back from their unprecedented four-year slide. Now that World War II was drawing to a close, servicemen were returning home in large numbers, returning to school, and once again bolstering the quality of players on team rosters nationwide. Even with the increased pool of players to choose from, coach Clark was more selective in his choices, and the 1945 Nebraska roster was reduced by twenty from that of the previous year.

== Game summaries ==
=== Oklahoma ===
Oklahoma at Nebraska

Team	1	2	Total
• Oklahoma			20
Nebraska			0

- Date: September 29
- Location: Memorial Stadium • Lincoln, Nebraska

The Huskers stumbled in their first game under coach Clark, and first game in Lincoln under his tenure. Different this time from previous years, however, was the competitive nature of the game. Oklahoma still kept the Cornhuskers off the board, but the defeat still provided a ray of hope that as the players learned coach Clark's ways, the fortunes of Nebraska could be reversed. Nebraska also still held the series overall, leading 16–6–3.

=== Minnesota ===
Minnesota at Nebraska

Team	1	2	Total
• Minnesota			61
Nebraska			7

- Date: October 6
- Location: Memorial Stadium • Lincoln, Nebraska

Encouraged by the showing at Oklahoma, and welcoming the chance to play at home against rival Minnesota, Nebraska only fell behind 0–14 before bouncing back to pull within seven points by the break. The showing was much more impressive than last week's loss to the Sooners, as the game was clearly still in reach. After the break, however, Nebraska collapsed completely under the onslaught of the Golden Gophers as a scoring explosion quickly pushed the game out of reach, with Minnesota scoring three times in each of the final two quarters. The 7–61 loss tied the worst margin of victory that the Cornhuskers had ever suffered, and set a new all-time record for most points scored against Nebraska in program history. The loss was the 5th in a row to Minnesota, as the Golden Gophers improved to 21–4–2 in the series.

=== Indiana ===
Nebraska at #8 Indiana

Team	1	2	Total
Nebraska			14
• #8 Indiana			54

- Date: October 13
- Location: Memorial Stadium • Bloomington, Indiana

The Hoosiers were ranked #8 when Nebraska arrived, and it was a tall order to hope for victory against an Indiana team that had risen over the past several years to be a formidable powerhouse. The Cornhuskers were outplayed in almost every aspect of the game and fell by a 40-point margin. The one ray of hope taken away from the contest by Nebraska was that they had scored more points on Indiana than any other team so far in the season. Once upon a time, Nebraska had held the series lead at 3–0–2, but the Hoosiers had since run off five straight wins to take the series lead back, and dealt Nebraska their third consecutive year of three losses to open the season. Indiana would go on to finish the season as Big 9 champions, undefeated at 9–0–1, and ranked 4th in the AP Poll.

=== Iowa State ===
Nebraska at Iowa State

Team	1	2	Total
Nebraska			7
• Iowa State			27

- Date: October 20
- Location: Clyde Williams Field • Ames, Iowa
- Game attendance: 11,699

Iowa State was too much for Nebraska to hold off, failing to convert repeated trips inside the Cyclone 20 yard line into points. The only Cornhusker score was the result of a forced turnover returned for a touchdown, and the game's outcome set a new dubious record in the Nebraska program by marking the first time the Cornhuskers had ever opened a season with four straight losses, showing that new head coach Clark still had his work cut out for him. Iowa State still had some distance to cover to catch Nebraska in their history, lagging 8–31–1 all time.

=== Missouri ===
Nebraska at Missouri

Team	1	2	3	4	Total
Nebraska	0	0	0	0	0
• Missouri	7	6	0	6	19

- Date: October 27
- Location: Faurot Field • Columbia, Missouri

Again facing a highly favored Missouri squad in Columbia, the Cornhuskers held the powerful Tigers to just nineteen points, with the final touchdown squeaking in with less than a minute to play. This was a continuation of the record opening stretch of losses, now five in a row, which also tied the record for most ever losses in row set just four years before. The Tigers improved to 12–24–3 against the Cornhuskers all time.

=== Kansas ===
Kansas at Nebraska

Team	1	2	3	4	Total
Kansas	0	0	13	0	13
• Nebraska	7	7	0	13	27

- Date: November 3
- Location: Memorial Stadium • Lincoln, Nebraska
- Game attendance: 15,000

In front of a larger Lincoln homecoming crowd than had been seen in recent years, Nebraska faced the Jayhawks with a serious chip on their shoulder after the heartbreaking loss to Kansas the previous year that had broken the unbeaten Cornhusker streak in the series at 27 and marked the first loss to Kansas in Lincoln since 1896. Today was payback day, and Nebraska ran up to a 14–0 lead against the favored Jayhawks by halftime. Kansas made some adjustments and stormed back to make it 13–14 and keep the game in doubt until the Cornhuskers punched in another two touchdowns to slam the door on Kansas and capture the first win of 1945. The satisfying homecoming win moved Nebraska to 39–10–3 against Kansas overall.

=== Kansas State ===
Nebraska at Kansas State

Team	1	2	3	4	Total
• Nebraska	6	0	12	6	24
Kansas State	0	0	0	0	0

- Date: November 10
- Location: Memorial Stadium • Manhattan, Kansas

Kansas State fell again to Nebraska, as the Cornhuskers rallied to build on the encouraging defeat of the Kansas Jayhawks in the previous game. For the second time in a row, the Kansas State Wildcats were held off the scoreboard by Nebraska. With the loss, their third in a row to Nebraska, the Wildcats fell to 4–24–3 in the series.

=== South Dakota ===
South Dakota at Nebraska

Team	1	2	Total
South Dakota			0
• Nebraska			53

- Date: November 17
- Location: Memorial Stadium • Lincoln, Nebraska

After a thirteen-year break in the series, South Dakota and Nebraska met again, but the outcome was much the same as in the days of old. The Cornhusker starters started quickly out to a 21–0 lead after just one quarter, and then rested for the rest of the game. The Coyotes remained unable to hold back even the Nebraska reserves, and by the end of the game South Dakota was scoreless after allowing the Cornhuskers to amass 53 points. Though the Coyotes took a victory in the first ever meeting of these teams in 1899, they remained winless in all games since and fell to 1–9–2 in the series.

=== Iowa ===
Iowa at Nebraska

Team	1	2	3	4	Total
Iowa	6	0	0	0	6
• Nebraska	6	0	7	0	13

- Date: November 24
- Location: Memorial Stadium • Lincoln, Nebraska

Iowa arrived in Lincoln fresh off of an upset 20–19 victory over Minnesota, the very team that scored more on Nebraska than any other team in Cornhusker history just seven weeks prior. Iowa received the opening kickoff and returned it for a touchdown. On Nebraska's next possession, however, the game was tied up soon enough at 6–6. The squads held each other off until after the half when Nebraska was stalled and readied for a field goal attempt. The kick was no good, but a Hawkeye offside penalty on the attempt handed Nebraska a first down, which the Cornhuskers ultimately converted into a touchdown, and Iowa never recovered from the shift in fortunes. Iowa's win streak against Nebraska was ended at three, and the Cornhuskers improved to 21–10–3 in the series.

== Personnel ==
=== Coaching staff ===
Name	Title	First year in this position	Years at Nebraska	Alma mater
George Clark	Head coach	1945	1945, 1948	Illinois
L. F. "Pop" Klein	Assistant coach	1945	1945–1958	
John Johnson	Line coach	1945	1945, 1947	
Bob Ingalls	Center coach	1945	1945	Michigan
Leonard Schultz	End coach	1945	1945	
Dave Strong	Backfield coach	1945	1945	

=== Roster ===
Baalhorn, Dean #46 HB; Bauer, Arthur #29 HB; Buchanan, William #20 G Bunker, Willard #17 E Costello, Robert #56 C Cranston, Harlan #18 E Fink, Alex #25 HB; Fischer, Cletus QB; Fredrickson, Dean #21 G Gillaspie, Tom #30 QB; Gradoville, Edward #26 HB; Harrington, Don #42 HB; Hornby, James #51 E Hoy, Rex #13 G Johnson, Roger #23 G Kinnaman, William #60 HB; Kipper, Paul #50 E Korte, Robert #16 E Lipps, Robert #27 G Lorenz, Fred #53 G	Miller, Salo #54 E Moore, Gerald #32 FB; Reninger, Clyde T Robinson, Magnus #33 HB; Rolfsmeyer, William #31 G Sack, Duane #52 G Sailors, Don #63 E Schneider, Alec #48 E Sedlacek, John #24 T Selden, Burl #22 T Short, Richard #19 C Skog, Richard #36 HB; Sloan, William #39 QB; Story, Charles #28 HB; Tegt, Robert #62 T Weiss, James #45 FB; Wiemers, Duane #37 T Wilhelms, Meno #41 T Williams, Robert #12 T Young, Philip #38 FB

== After the season ==
Although Nebraska had set a new record of disappointment by losing the first five games in a row, the outcome of the campaign's contests told a tale of two seasons. Over the first five games, Nebraska was outscored an average of 6–36, but upon turning the corner they finished the final four games ahead of the opposition with an average of 29–5. Hopes were high that despite a fifth straight losing season, that the clear transition midseason to winning form meant that the program was on the path back to success.

Coach Clark's first year moved Nebraska to 309–127–31 (.695), which was the first time the program's winning percentage had slipped below .700 since 1902. The Big 6 record also slipped slightly, to 113–28–11 (.780). Coach Clark somewhat unexpectedly opted to depart Nebraska after his first year, to coach elsewhere, casting a small measure of doubt on Nebraska's future. The groundwork had been laid, however, and it was hoped that a capable coach could come in and continue where coach Clark left off.
