= California–USC football rivalry =

American college football rivalry between the California Golden Bears and USC Trojans

- California Golden Bears USC Trojans
- First meeting: November 28, 1912; California, 18–0
- Latest meeting: October 28, 2023; USC, 50–49
- Next meeting: TBD
- Trophy: None

Statistics
- Total meetings: 112
- All-time series: USC leads, 72–32–6
- Largest victory: USC, 74–0 (1930)
- Longest win streak: USC, 14 (2004–17)
- Current win streak: USC, 2 (2022–present)

Locations of California and USC

The California–USC football rivalry, also known as the Weekender, is an American college football rivalry between the California Golden Bears and USC Trojans.

== History ==
While not as significant as the Stanford or UCLA rivalries for either school, the in-state rivals have met on the football field 112 times. The game between the schools was often called The Weekender, referring to the weekend trip to the Bay Area; although, this term also applied to the Stanford game, as each series (USC/Cal and USC/Stanford) would alternate home and away. As of the 2023 season, USC had played Cal more than any other opponent, with the 2023 game marking the 112th meeting, according to Cal, and the 108th meeting according to USC, with discrepancies in the game record before 1920. The last Weekender was played on October 28, 2023, with Cal losing to USC 50–49. USC leads the all-time series 72–32–6. In 2024, USC joined the Big Ten Conference while Cal joined the Atlantic Coast Conference. This will put the rivalry between the Bears and Trojans on hiatus with no future meetings scheduled as of 2025. USC's is California's second most played opponent all-time (behind only Stanford) while California is USC's all-time most-played opponent.

== Game results ==
California victories	USC victories	Tie games

No.	Date	Location	Winner	Score
1	November 28, 1912^{1}	Berkeley, CA	California	18–0
2	November 27, 1913^{1}	Los Angeles, CA	Tie	3–3
3	October 23, 1915	Berkeley, CA	USC	28–10
4	November 25, 1915	Los Angeles, CA	California	23–21
5	November 4, 1916	Los Angeles, CA	California	27–0
6	November 29, 1917	Los Angeles, CA	Tie	0–0
7	December 14, 1918	Los Angeles, CA	California	33–7
8	November 8, 1919	Los Angeles, CA	California	14–13
9	November 5, 1921	Berkeley, CA	California	38–7
10	October 28, 1922	Pasadena, CA	California	12–0
11	November 10, 1923	Los Angeles, CA	California	13–7
12	November 1, 1924	Berkeley, CA	California	7–0
13	October 23, 1926	Berkeley, CA	USC	27–0
14	October 29, 1927	Los Angeles, CA	USC	13–0
15	October 20, 1928	Berkeley, CA	Tie	0–0
16	November 2, 1929	Los Angeles, CA	California	15–7
17	November 8, 1930	Los Angeles, CA	USC	74–0
18	October 24, 1931	Berkeley, CA	USC	6–0
19	November 5, 1932	Los Angeles, CA	USC	27–7
20	October 28, 1933	Berkeley, CA	USC	6–3
21	November 10, 1934	Los Angeles, CA	California	7–2
22	October 26, 1935	Berkeley, CA	California	21–7
23	November 7, 1936	Los Angeles, CA	California	13–7
24	October 23, 1937	Berkeley, CA	No. 1 California	20–6
25	November 5, 1938	Los Angeles, CA	No. 13 USC	13–7
26	October 28, 1939	Berkeley, CA	No. 8 USC	26–0
27	November 9, 1940	Los Angeles, CA	California	20–7
28	October 25, 1941	Berkeley, CA	California	41–0
29	November 7, 1942	Los Angeles, CA	USC	21–7
30	October 2, 1943	Berkeley, CA	USC	7–0
31	October 30, 1943	Los Angeles, CA	No. 5 USC	13–0
32	October 7, 1944	Los Angeles, CA	Tie	6–6
33	November 18, 1944	Berkeley, CA	No. 12 USC	32–0
34	September 29, 1945	Berkeley, CA	USC	13–2
35	November 10, 1945	Los Angeles, CA	USC	14–0
36	November 9, 1946	Los Angeles, CA	No. 14 USC	14–0
37	October 25, 1947	Berkeley, CA	No. 10 USC	39–14
38	October 30, 1948	Los Angeles, CA	No. 4 California	13–7
39	October 15, 1949	Berkeley, CA	No. 9 California	16–10
40	October 14, 1950	Los Angeles, CA	No. 7 California	13–7
41	October 20, 1951	Berkeley, CA	No. 11 USC	21–14
42	October 25, 1952	Los Angeles, CA	No. 7 USC	10–0
43	October 24, 1953	Berkeley, CA	No. 11 USC	32–20
44	October 23, 1954	Los Angeles, CA	No. 17 USC	29–27
45	October 22, 1955	Berkeley, CA	No. 10 USC	33–6
46	November 10, 1956	Los Angeles, CA	No. 16 USC	20–7
47	October 19, 1957	Berkeley, CA	California	12–0
48	October 18, 1958	Los Angeles, CA	California	14–12
49	October 31, 1959	Berkeley, CA	No. 6 USC	14–7
50	October 15, 1960	Los Angeles, CA	USC	27–10
51	October 21, 1961	Berkeley, CA	USC	28–14
52	October 20, 1962	Los Angeles, CA	No. 3 USC	32–6
53	October 26, 1963	Berkeley, CA	USC	36–6
54	October 24, 1964	Los Angeles, CA	USC	26–21
55	November 6, 1965	Berkeley, CA	No. 6 USC	35–0
56	November 5, 1966	Los Angeles, CA	No. 9 USC	35–9
57	November 4, 1967	Berkeley, CA	No. 1 USC	31–12

No.	Date	Location	Winner	Score
58	November 9, 1968	Los Angeles, CA	No. 1 USC	35–17
59	November 1, 1969	Berkeley, CA	No. 6 USC	14–9
60	October 31, 1970	Los Angeles, CA	California	13–10
61	October 30, 1971	Berkeley, CA	No. 20 USC	28–0
62	October 14, 1972	Los Angeles, CA	No. 1 USC	42–14
63	November 3, 1973	Berkeley, CA	No. 9 USC	50–14
64	November 2, 1974	Los Angeles, CA	Tie	15–15
65	November 1, 1975	Berkeley, CA	California	28–14
66	October 30, 1976	Los Angeles, CA	No. 4 USC	20–6
67	October 29, 1977	Berkeley, CA	California	17–14
68	October 28, 1978	Los Angeles, CA	No. 6 USC	42–17
69	October 27, 1979	Berkeley, CA	No. 3 USC	24–14
70	November 1, 1980	Los Angeles, CA	No. 7 USC	60–7
71	November 7, 1981	Berkeley, CA	No. 3 USC	21–3
72	November 6, 1982	Los Angeles, CA	No. 16 USC	42–0
73	October 29, 1983	Berkeley, CA	USC	19–9
74	October 27, 1984	Los Angeles, CA	No. 20 USC	31–7
75	November 9, 1985	Berkeley, CA	California	14–6
76	November 15, 1986	Los Angeles, CA	No. 13 USC	28–3
77	September 26, 1987	Berkeley, CA	USC	31–14
78	November 5, 1988	Los Angeles, CA	No. 2 USC	35–3
79	October 14, 1989	Berkeley, CA	No. 10 USC	31–15
80	November 3, 1990	Los Angeles, CA	Tie	31–31
81	November 2, 1991	Berkeley, CA	No. 10 California	52–30
82	October 17, 1992	Los Angeles, CA	No. 18 USC	27–24
83	October 30, 1993	Berkeley, CA	USC	42–14
84	October 22, 1994	Los Angeles, CA	USC	61–0
85	October 7, 1995	Berkeley, CA	No. 5 USC	26–16
86	October 5, 1996	Los Angeles, CA	California	22–15
87	September 27, 1997	Berkeley, CA	USC	27–17
88	October 10, 1998	Los Angeles, CA	California	32–31
89	October 30, 1999	Berkeley, CA	California^{†}	17–7
90	October 28, 2000	Los Angeles, CA	California	28–16
91	November 10, 2001	Berkeley, CA	USC	55–14
92	October 12, 2002	Los Angeles, CA	No. 20 USC	30–28
93	September 27, 2003	Berkeley, CA	California	34–31^{3OT}
94	October 9, 2004	Los Angeles, CA	No. 1 USC	23–17
95	November 12, 2005	Berkeley, CA	No. 1 USC^{‡}	35–10
96	November 18, 2006	Los Angeles, CA	No. 4 USC	23–9
97	November 10, 2007	Berkeley, CA	No. 12 USC	24–17
98	November 8, 2008	Los Angeles, CA	No. 6 USC	17–3
99	October 3, 2009	Berkeley, CA	No. 7 USC	30–3
100	October 16, 2010	Los Angeles, CA	USC	48–14
101	October 13, 2011	San Francisco, CA	USC	30–9
102	September 22, 2012	Los Angeles, CA	No. 13 USC	27–9
103	November 9, 2013	Berkeley, CA	USC	62–28
104	November 13, 2014	Los Angeles, CA	USC	38–30
105	October 31, 2015	Berkeley, CA	USC	27–21
106	October 27, 2016	Los Angeles, CA	USC	45–24
107	September 23, 2017	Berkeley, CA	No. 5 USC	30–20
108	November 10, 2018	Los Angeles, CA	California	15–14
109	November 16, 2019	Berkeley, CA	USC	41–17
110	December 4, 2021	Berkeley, CA	California	24–14
111	November 5, 2022	Los Angeles, CA	No. 9 USC	41–35
112	October 28, 2023	Berkeley, CA	No. 24 USC	50–49
Series: USC leads 72–32–6
† California vacated this win for use of ineligible players. ‡ USC vacated this win after NCAA sanctions.

- ^{1} = Rugby football game.

Game results sources:

== See also ==
- Stanford–USC football rivalry
- California–UCLA football rivalry
- List of NCAA college football rivalry games
- List of most-played college football series in NCAA Division I
