= Chauncey Simpson =

College sports coach (1901–1970)

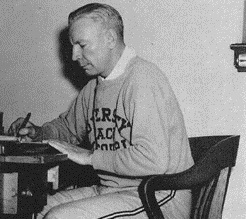
- Simpson from The Savitar, 1946

Biographical details
- Born: December 21, 1910; Bosworth, Missouri, U.S.
- Died: April 20, 1970 (aged 59); Green Valley, Arizona, U.S.

Playing career

Football
- 1924: Missouri
- 1926–1927: Kirksville

Basketball
- c. 1927: Kirksville

Track and field
- c. 1925: Missouri
- c. 1927: Kirksville

Coaching career (HC unless noted)

Football
- 1928–1933: Kirksville (assistant)
- 1934–1942: Missouri (assistant)
- 1943–1945: Missouri
- 1946–1954: Missouri (assistant)

Basketball
- 1934–1935: Kirksville

Track and field
- 1935–1946: Missouri

Head coaching record
- Overall: 12–14–2 (football); 6–6 (basketball)
- Bowls: 0–1

Accomplishments and honors

Championships
- Football; 1 Big Six (1945)

Chauncey Simpson (December 21, 1901 – April 20, 1970) was an American college football, college basketball, and track and field coach. He was the interim head football coach at University of Missouri from 1943 to 1945 while Don Faurot, the standing head coach, served in the Navy during World War II. He compiled a 12–14–2 record including a 40–27 loss to Texas in the 1946 Cotton Bowl Classic. During that time, he also served as the school's track coach. He himself, was a football player at Missouri. With Faurot's return in 1946 Simpson reverted to his pre-war position as an assistant football coach. He was also the institution's long-time golf coach before retiring in the 1960s.

Simpson died of a heart attack, on April 20, 1970, at his home in Green Valley, Arizona. He was the younger brother of hurdler and track coach Robert Simpson.

== Head coaching record ==
Year	Team	Overall	Conference	Standing	Bowl/playoffs
Missouri Tigers (Big Six Conference) (1943–1945)
1943	Missouri	3–5	3–2	2nd	
1944	Missouri	3–5–2	2–1–2	3rd	
1945	Missouri	6–4	5–0	1st	L Cotton
Total:		12–14–2			
National championship Conference title Conference division title or championship game berth
