= 1945 Oklahoma Sooners football team =

American college football season

1945 Oklahoma Sooners football
- Conference: Big Six Conference
- Record: 5–5 (4–1 Big 6)
- Head coach: Dewey Luster (5th season)
- Captain: Eran Burgert
- Home stadium: Owen Field

1945 Big Six Conference football standings
	Conf.					Overall
Team	W		L		T	W		L		T
Missouri $	5	–	0	–	0	6	–	4	–	0
Oklahoma	4	–	1	–	0	5	–	5	–	0
Iowa State	2	–	2	–	1	4	–	3	–	1
Nebraska	2	–	3	–	0	4	–	5	–	0
Kansas	1	–	3	–	1	4	–	5	–	1
Kansas State	0	–	5	–	0	1	–	7	–	0
$ – Conference champion

The 1945 Oklahoma Sooners football team represented the University of Oklahoma in the 1945 college football season. In their fifth year under head coach Dewey Luster, the Sooners compiled a 5–5 record (4–1 against conference opponents), finished in second place in the Big Six Conference championship, and outscored their opponents by a combined total of 169 to 138.

No Sooners received All-America honors in 1945, but five Sooners received all-conference honors: Omer Burgert (end); Lester Jensen (guard); Thomas Tallchief (tackle); Jack Venable (back); and John West (back).

== Schedule ==
Date	Time	Opponent	Rank	Site	Result	Attendance	Source
September 22	2:30 p.m.	Hondo AAF*		Owen Field; Norman, OK	W 21–6	10,000	
September 29		at Nebraska		Memorial Stadium; Lincoln, NE (rivalry)	W 20–0	17,000	
October 6		Texas A&M*		Owen Field; Norman, OK	L 14–19	20,000	
October 13		vs. No. 10 Texas*		Cotton Bowl; Dallas, TX (rivalry)	L 7–12	45,000	
October 20		Kansas		Owen Field; Norman, OK	W 39–7	13,000	
October 27		at Kansas State		Memorial Stadium; Manhattan, KS	W 41–13		
November 3		TCU*	No. 14	Owen Field; Norman, OK	L 7–13	21,000	
November 10		Iowa State		Owen Field; Norman, OK	W 14–7	13,163	
November 17		at Missouri	No. –14	Memorial Stadium; Columbia, MO (rivalry)	L 6–14		
November 24		No. 6 Oklahoma A&M*		Owen Field; Norman, OK (Bedlam)	L 0–47	33,000	
*Non-conference game; Rankings from AP Poll released prior to the game

== Rankings ==
The first AP poll came out on October 7. The Sooners made their first appearance in the poll on October 28 and made their last appearance on the poll released on November 11.

Ranking movements Legend: ██ Increase in ranking ██ Decrease in ranking — = Not ranked т = Tied with team above or below
	Week								
Poll	1	2	3	4	5	6	7	8	Final
AP	—	—	—	14	—	14т	—	—	—

== NFL draft ==
The following players were drafted into the National Football League following the season.

Round	Pick	Player	Position	NFL team
6	42	Thurman Tigart	Guard	Boston Yanks
15	133	Tom Tallchief	Tackle	Pittsburgh Steelers
23	220	Derald Lebow	Back	Los Angeles Rams
32	300	John West	Back	Los Angeles Rams
