= Northwest Championship =

Unofficial American football title

- Oregon Ducks Oregon State Beavers Washington Huskies Washington State Cougars
- Sport: College football
- Location: Pacific Northwest
- First meeting: 1903
- Stadiums: Autzen Stadium; Reser Stadium; Husky Stadium; Martin Stadium
- Trophy: None

Statistics
- All-time series: Washington, 33; Oregon, 16; Oregon State, 12; Washington State, 6
- Largest victory: Oregon, 172–62 (2008)
- Longest win streak: Oregon, 7 (2008–2014)
- Current win streak: Washington, 2 (2022–2023)

Locations of Oregon, Oregon State, Washington, and Washington State

The Northwest Championship was an unofficial Division I FBS football rivalry series title earned by way of an undefeated sweep of the other three fellow Pac-12 teams located in the Pacific Northwest states of Oregon and Washington. The Washington Huskies won 33 "championships" of the region, just one shy of the 34 won by the other three programs combined.

Oregon, Oregon State, Washington, and Washington State first played each other in a round-robin format in the 1903 season. As geographic neighbors and members of the former Pacific Coast Conference and current Pac-12 Conference North Division, each team has generally played the others annually. Among the Ducks, Beavers, Huskies, and Cougars there exist four traditional football rivalries: Oregon–Oregon State, Oregon–Washington, Oregon State–Washington State, and Washington–Washington State.

The feat's "Northwest Championship" moniker was coined by Rick Neuheisel, head coach of the 2002 Washington Huskies. After a string of disappointing losses, he challenged his players to win the newly conceived title by defeating their northwest rivals in the season's remaining games. The title is not without precedence though as the 1897 Oregon Agricultural Aggies football team, precursors to the Oregon State Beavers, declared themselves "Champions of the Northwest" after defeating both Washington and Oregon, though they did not play Washington State that season.

The Northwest Championship has been described as a "so-called", "fictitious", and "mythical" title, invented by Neuheisel only to motivate his 2002 team. Nevertheless, in the years following the Huskies' original claim of the title, other teams have continued to be cited as winning the Northwest Championship upon completing the sweep. Due to Oregon and Washington's departure to the Big Ten as part of the 2021–2024 NCAA conference realignment, even though the Apple Cup and Civil War will continue, the Northwest Championship is unlikely to continue unless games between Oregon and Washington State or between Oregon State and Washington are scheduled in future seasons.

== Teams ==
The Northwest Championship involved the four Pacific Northwest teams that played football in the North Division of the Pac-12 Conference. Oregon, Oregon State, Washington, and Washington State generally played each other annually in a 6-game round-robin series. Four of the six games were heated rivalry games, and all of the games represented some of the most-played college football series.

- Oregon Ducks football
- Oregon State Beavers football
- Washington Huskies football
- Washington State Cougars football

=== Other Northwest teams ===
Since its introduction, it has been unclear if other football schools in the Pacific Northwest are eligible to win the Northwest Championship. Washington beat Idaho in 2002, but they were not mentioned in Neuheisel's conception of the title. Boise State beat Oregon in 2008 and 2009, years where Oregon swept its in-conference northwest foes, and has been mentioned as potentially deserving a spot in the series.

== 2002 origin ==
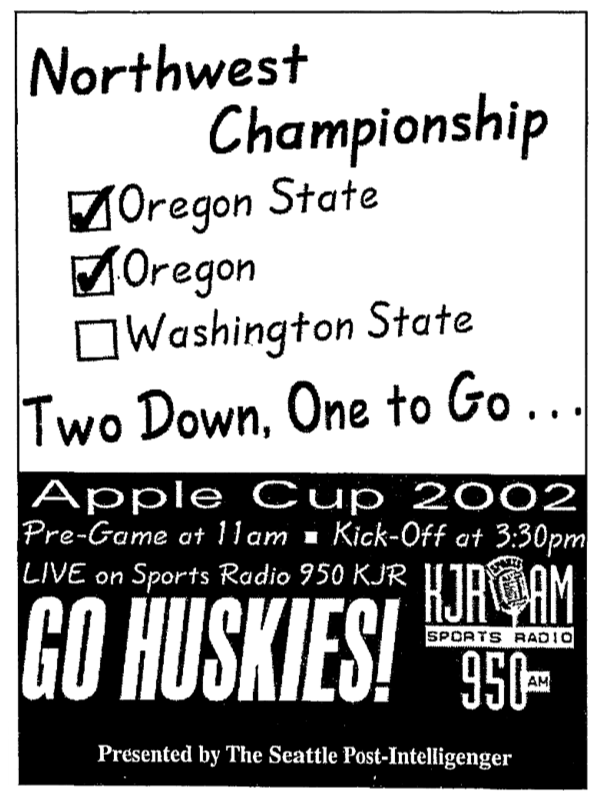
Progress towards the 2002 Northwest Championship

In his fourth year as head coach, Neuheisel's 2002 team was floundering. In early November they had a 4–5 record, 1–4 against Pac-10 opponents, and had lost 4 of the last 5 games. The Huskies were at serious risk of a losing season, their first since 1976, and of missing a bowl game.

Through rare happenstance, Washington was scheduled to play the three other Pacific Northwest schools in order to end the season. Neuheisel, sensing an opportunity to motivate his team, declared that despite the thus far disappointing season the Huskies were still fighting to win the "Northwest Championship" by sweeping Oregon State, Oregon, and Washington State in their remaining games.

It was a successful rallying cry, and the Huskies first beat Oregon State. The next week they won at Autzen Stadium, their first win against Oregon on the road since 1996. The Huskies capped the season with a triple-overtime victory in Pullman over No. 3 Washington State in the Apple Cup, claiming the Northwest Championship with back-to-back-to-back wins over the other northwest schools.

== Trophy ==
No trophy is awarded to the Northwest Champion, and no organization grants the title.

In 2002, the Huskies wore homemade t-shirts to mark their progress towards the Northwest Championship. The football undershirts had three blank boxes labeled for the other northwest schools, which the players checked off after each win.

== Results ==
The Washington Huskies were successful in claiming the newly coined Northwest Championship in 2002. Since then, Oregon and Oregon State have both also won the title and been called Northwest Champions by local media. Washington State has yet to complete the sweep in the years since the title was named, but several times has been on the hunt going into the end-of-season Apple Cup. The Washington Huskies swept the northwest schools for the final time in 2023, on the way to a 14–1 season.

Historical results have been compiled for prior years by the school athletic departments, local media, and fans of the football programs.

The four teams first met in a six-game round-robin fashion in the 1903 season. This was also the first season in which any of the teams played all three of the others.

Season	Northwest Champion	Game 1	Game 2	Game 3
1903	Washington	5–0 Oregon Agricultural	10–0 Washington Agricultural	6–5 Oregon
1904^{4}				
1905^{4}				
1906^{3}*				
1907^{3}*				
1908^{4}				
1909^{3}*				
1910^{4}				
1911^{5}	Washington	34–0 Oregon Agricultural	29–3 Oregon	30–6 Washington State
1912	Washington	9–3 Oregon Agricultural	30–14 Oregon	19–0 Washington State
1913^{5}	Washington	47–0 Oregon Agricultural	10–7 Oregon	20–0 Washington State
1914				
1915^{3}*				
1916^{5}				
1917^{5}	Washington State	26–3 Oregon	6–0 Oregon Agricultural	14–0 Washington
1918^{3}*				
1919^{5}				
1920^{4}				
1921^{5}				
1922				
1923	Washington	14–0 Oregon Agricultural	24–7 Washington State	26–7 Oregon
1924				
1925^{3}*				
1926^{4}				
1927^{4}*				
1928^{5}				
1929^{4}*				
1930^{4}*				
1931^{4}*				
1932^{4}*				
1933^{4}*				
1934^{5}				
1935^{4}*				
1936	Washington	19–7 Oregon State	7–0 Oregon	40–0 Washington State
1937				
1938	Oregon State	13–6 Washington	7–6 Washington State	14–0 Oregon
1939	Oregon State	13–7 Washington	13–0 Washington State	19–14 Oregon
1940	Washington	10–0 Oregon	19–0 Oregon State	33–9 Washington State
1941				
1942				
1943^{0}*				
1944^{0}*				
1945^{12}				
1946	Oregon State	13–12 Washington State	13–0 Oregon	21–12 Washington
1947	Oregon	6–0 Washington	12–6 Washington State	14–6 Oregon State
1948	Oregon	33–7 Washington State	13–7 Washington	10–0 Oregon State
1949	Oregon State	7–3 Washington	35–6 Washington State	20–10 Oregon
1950	Washington	35–6 Oregon State	27–12 Oregon	52–21 Washington State
1951	Washington State	26–13 Oregon State	41–6 Oregon	27–25 Washington
1952	Washington	49–0 Oregon	38–13 Oregon State	33–27 Washington State
1953				
1954	Oregon	26–7 Washington	26–14 Washington State	33–14 Oregon State
1955				
1956				
1957				
1958	Washington State	6–0 Oregon	7–0 Oregon State	18–14 Washington
1959	Washington	13–12 Oregon	13–6 Oregon State	20–0 Washington State
1960	Washington	30–29 Oregon State	7–6 Oregon	8–7 Washington State
1961	Oregon State	14–6 Washington State	3–0 Washington	6–2 Oregon
1962				
1963	Washington	34–7 Oregon State	26–19 Oregon	16–0 Washington State
1964	Oregon State	9–7 Washington	24–7 Washington State	7–6 Oregon
1965	Washington	24–20 Oregon	28–21 Oregon State	27–9 Washington State
1966	Oregon State	41–13 Washington State	24–12 Washington	20–15 Oregon
1967				
1968	Oregon State	35–21 Washington	16–8 Washington State	41–19 Oregon
1969	Oregon State	10–6 Washington	38–3 Washington State	10–7 Oregon
1970	Washington	29–20 Oregon State	25–13 Oregon	43–25 Washington State
1971				
1972	Washington State	31–14 Oregon	37–7 Oregon State	27–10 Washington
1973	Washington State	21–14 Oregon	13–7 Oregon State	52–26 Washington
1974	Oregon State	23–9 Washington	17–3 Washington State	35–16 Oregon
1975	Washington	27–17 Oregon	35–7 Oregon State	28–27 Washington State
1976	Washington	24–12 Oregon State	14–7 Oregon	51–32 Washington State
1977	Washington	54–0 Oregon	14–6 Oregon State	35–15 Washington State
1978	Washington	34–0 Oregon State	20–14 Oregon	38–8 Washington State
1979	Washington	21–17 Oregon	41–0 Oregon State	17–7 Washington State
1980	Oregon	34–10 Washington	20–10 Washington State	40–21 Oregon State
1981	Washington	17–3 Oregon	56–17 Oregon State	23–10 Washington State
1982				
1983	Washington State	24–7 Oregon	27–9 Oregon State	17–6 Washington
1984	Washington	19–7 Oregon State	17–10 Oregon	38–29 Washington State
1985				
1986	Washington	38–3 Oregon	28–12 Oregon State	44–23 Washington State
1987^{5}	Oregon	29–22 Washington	31–17 Washington State	44–0 Oregon State
1988^{5}				
1989	Washington	20–14 Oregon	51–14 Oregon State	20–9 Washington State
1990^{4}*				
1991	Washington	29–7 Oregon	58–6 Oregon State	56–21 Washington State
1992				
1993	Washington	21–6 Oregon	28–21 Oregon State	26–3 Washington State
1994				
1995	Oregon	26–7 Washington State	24–22 Washington	12–10 Oregon State
1996	Washington	33–14 Oregon	42–3 Oregon State	31–24 ^{OT} Washington State
1997^{5}				
1998^{5}				
1999	Washington	34–20 Oregon	47–21 Oregon State	24–14 Washington State
2000				
2001^{5}				
2002^{5} †	Washington	41–29 Oregon State	42–14 Oregon	29–26 ^{3OT} Washington State
2003	Washington	38–17 Oregon State	42–10 Oregon	27–19 Washington State
2004	Oregon State	29–14 Washington	38–19 Washington State	50–21 Oregon
2005	Oregon	45–21 Washington	34–31 Washington State	56–14 Oregon State
2006				
2007	Oregon State	29–23 Washington	52–17 Washington State	38–31 ^{2OT} Oregon
2008	Oregon	45–10 Washington	63–14 Washington State	65–38 Oregon State
2009	Oregon	52–6 Washington State	43–19 Washington	37–33 Oregon State
2010	Oregon	43–23 Washington State	53–16 Washington	37–20 Oregon State
2011	Oregon	43–28 Washington State	34–17 Washington	49–21 Oregon State
2012	Oregon	51–26 Washington State	52–21 Washington	48–24 Oregon State
2013	Oregon	45–24 Washington	62–38 Washington State	36–35 Oregon State
2014	Oregon	38–31 Washington State	45–20 Washington	47–19 Oregon State
2015				
2016	Washington	70–21 Oregon	41–17 Oregon State	45–17 Washington State
2017	Washington	42–7 Oregon State	38–3 Oregon	41–14 Washington State
2018				
2019	Oregon	35–31 Washington	37–35 Washington State	24–10 Oregon State
2020^{4}				
2021	Oregon	26–16 Washington	38–24 Washington State	38–29 Oregon State
2022	Washington	24–21 Oregon State	37–34 Oregon	51–33 Washington State
2023^{7}	Washington	36–33 Oregon	22–20 Oregon State	24–21 Washington State
2024^{4}*				
2025^{4}*				

* Years in which no sweep was possible due to no single team playing all three of the others.

^{5, 4, 3} Number of games played, of the possible 6-game round-robin series. If no annotation, all 6 games were played.

^{12, 0} The series was disrupted by World War II, with only Washington fielding a team in 1943 and 1944. In 1945 each team played the others twice, for a total of 12 games.

^{7} After winning the Northwest Championship in the regular season, Washington also won their rematch with Oregon in the 2023 Pac-12 Football Championship Game.

† The "Northwest Championship" name was coined in 2002.

Northwest Championship
Team	Sweeps
Washington	33
Oregon	16
Oregon State	12
Washington State	6

Longest Streaks
Team	Streak
Oregon	7
Washington	5
Oregon State	2
Washington State	2
