= 1945 SMU Mustangs football team =

American college football season

1945 SMU Mustangs football
- Conference: Southwest Conference
- Record: 5–6 (4–2 SWC)
- Head coach: Matty Bell (8th season)
- Captains: Tom Dean; Howard Maley
- Home stadium: Ownby Stadium

1945 Southwest Conference football standings
	Conf.					Overall
Team	W		L		T	W		L		T
No. 10 Texas $	5	–	1	–	0	10	–	1	–	0
SMU	4	–	2	–	0	5	–	6	–	0
TCU	3	–	3	–	0	5	–	5	–	0
Rice	3	–	3	–	0	5	–	6	–	0
Texas A&M	3	–	3	–	0	6	–	4	–	0
Baylor	2	–	4	–	0	5	–	5	–	1
Arkansas	1	–	5	–	0	3	–	7	–	0
$ – Conference champion; Rankings from AP Poll

The 1945 SMU Mustangs football team was an American football team that represented Southern Methodist University (SMU) as a member of the Southwest Conference (SWC) during the 1945 college football season. In their eighth, non-consecutive season under head coach Matty Bell, the Mustangs compiled a 5–6 record (4–2 against conference opponents) and outscored opponents by a total of 201 to 110. After a stretch in which the team lost six of seven games, SMU finished the season with three consecutive shutout victories over Arkansas (21-0), Baylor (34-0), and TCU (34-0). The team played its home games at Ownby Stadium in the University Park suburb of Dallas.

Three SMU players received first-team honors from the Associated Press (AP) and/or United Press (UP) on the 1945 All-Southwest Conference football team: back Doak Walker (AP-1, UP-1); end Gene Wilson (AP-1, UP-1); and tackle Tom Dean (AP-1, UP-1).

== Schedule ==
Date	Time	Opponent	Site	Result	Attendance	Source
September 22		Blackland AAF*	Ownby Stadium; University Park, TX	W 51–0	6,500	
September 29	8:00 p.m.	at Corpus Christi NAS*	Buccaneer Stadium; Corpus Christi, TX	L 7–22	16,000	
October 6		Missouri*	Ownby Stadium; University Park, TX	L 7–10	8,000	
October 12		vs. No. 14 Oklahoma A&M*	Taft Stadium; Oklahoma City, OK	L 12–26	18,500	
October 20		Rice	Ownby Stadium; University Park, TX (rivalry)	W 21–18	10,000	
October 27		at Tulane*	Tulane Stadium; New Orleans, LA	L 7–19	28,000	
November 3		Texas	Ownby Stadium; University Park, TX	L 7–12	23,000	
November 10		at Texas A&M	Kyle Field; College Station, TX	L 0–3	10,000	
November 17		Arkansas	Ownby Stadium; University Park, TX	W 21–0	9,000	
November 24		at Baylor	Municipal Stadium; Waco, TX	W 34–0	9,000	
December 1		at TCU	Amon G. Carter Stadium; Fort Worth, TX (rivalry)	W 34–0	18,000	
*Non-conference game; Rankings from AP Poll released prior to the game; All times are in Central time
