= Baylor–Texas football rivalry =

American college football rivalry

- Baylor Bears Texas Longhorns
- First meeting: October 29, 1901; Texas, 23–0
- Latest meeting: September 23, 2023; Texas, 38–6
- Trophy: None

Statistics
- Total meetings: 113
- All-time series: Texas leads 81–28–4
- Largest victory: Texas, 77–0 (1913)
- Longest win streak: Texas, 16 (1958–73)
- Current win streak: Texas, 2 (2022–present)

Locations of Baylor and Texas

The Baylor–Texas football rivalry is an American college football rivalry between the Baylor Bears and Texas Longhorns.

== History ==
The in-state rivals have played each other 113 times, with the first game between Baylor and Texas being played in 1901. Only Oklahoma and Texas A&M have played Texas more times than Baylor. Both Baylor and Texas were founding members of the Southwest Conference and the Big 12 Conference. Texas leads the all-time series with Baylor 81–28–4. However, starting in 2010 this rivalry intensified as Baylor established themselves as a major contender in the Big 12 with Baylor playing for 4 conference titles and winning 3, including a head-to-head win over Texas to clinch the conference title in 2013, in what is now known as the "Ice Bowl". Losing the Big 12 title to Baylor, 30–10, was Mack Brown's last regular season game as the head coach at Texas.

In 2015, a 4–7 Texas team beat #12 Baylor 23–17 in Waco to ruin the Bears' Sugar Bowl chances. Baylor had started out the year 8–0 but lost two of their next three and also had injuries to their starting, backup, and third-string quarterbacks. They lost 44–34 to Oklahoma at home but beat #6 Oklahoma State 45–35 for their first win in Stillwater since 1939. Sitting at 9–1, the Bears still had a chance to win the Big 12, but lost 28–21 in overtime at TCU. Despite their Big 12 and CFP hopes gone, Baylor was looking to be the Big 12's representative to the Sugar Bowl after Oklahoma's 58–23 defeat of Oklahoma State (whom the Bears beat); they would have won the three-way tiebreaker between themselves, Oklahoma State, and TCU. However, Texas took advantage of the injury-plagued Baylor squad and upset the Bears 23–17, which meant that Baylor would no longer be in line for the Sugar Bowl; Oklahoma State jumped back into the picture and received the Big 12's berth.

With Texas departing the Big 12 to join the Southeastern Conference (SEC) in 2024, the future of the rivalry is uncertain beyond 2023. Prior to the departure of Texas to the SEC, the two teams had played annually since 1945 Since 2010 the series is led by Texas, 8–6.

== Game results ==
Baylor victories	Texas victories	Tie games

No.	Date	Location	Winning team		Losing team	
1	October 29, 1901	Waco, TX	Texas	23	Baylor	0
2	October 24, 1903	Austin, TX	Texas	48	Baylor	0
3	November 19, 1904	Waco, TX	Texas	58	Baylor	0
4	October 21, 1905	Austin, TX	Texas	39	Baylor	0
5	November 9, 1907	Austin, TX	Texas	27	Baylor	11
6	October 17, 1908	Austin, TX	Texas	12	Baylor	5
7	November 5, 1910	Waco, TX	Texas	1	Baylor	0
8	October 21, 1911	Austin, TX	Texas	11	Baylor	0
9	November 4, 1912	Waco, TX	Texas	19	Baylor	7
10	October 16, 1913	Austin, TX	Texas	77	Baylor	0
11	October 10, 1914	Austin, TX	Texas	57	Baylor	0
12	October 28, 1916	Austin, TX	Baylor	7	Texas	3
13	November 3, 1917	Waco, TX	Baylor	3	Texas	0
14	October 25, 1919	Austin, TX	Texas	29	Baylor	13
15	November 10, 1923	Waco, TX	Tie	7	Tie	7
16	November 8, 1924	Austin, TX	Baylor	28	Texas	10
17	November 7, 1925	Austin, TX	Texas	13	Baylor	3
18	November 6, 1926	Waco, TX	Baylor	10	Texas	7
19	November 5, 1927	Austin, TX	Texas	13	Baylor	12
20	November 10, 1928	Waco, TX	Texas	6	Baylor	0
21	November 9, 1929	Austin, TX	Tie	0	Tie	0
22	November 8, 1930	Waco, TX	Texas	14	Baylor	0
23	November 7, 1931	Austin, TX	Texas	25	Baylor	0
24	November 5, 1932	Waco, TX	Texas	19	Baylor	0
25	November 11, 1933	Austin, TX	Baylor	3	Texas	0
26	November 10, 1934	Austin, TX	Texas	25	Baylor	6
27	November 9, 1935	Waco, TX	Texas	25	Baylor	6
28	October 17, 1936	Austin, TX	Baylor	21	Texas	18
29	November 6, 1937	Waco, TX	Texas	9	No. 4 Baylor	6
30	November 5, 1938	Austin, TX	Baylor	14	Texas	3
31	November 11, 1939	Waco, TX	Baylor	20	Texas	0
32	November 9, 1940	Austin, TX	Texas	13	Baylor	0
33	November 8, 1941	Waco, TX	Tie	7	Tie	7
34	November 7, 1942	Austin, TX	No. 14 Texas	20	Baylor	0
35	November 10, 1945	Austin, TX	No. 17 Texas	21	Baylor	14
36	November 9, 1946	Waco, TX	No. 6 Texas	22	Baylor	7
37	November 8, 1947	Austin, TX	No. 8 Texas	28	Baylor	7
38	November 6, 1948	Waco, TX	Texas	13	Baylor	10
39	November 5, 1949	Austin, TX	Texas	20	No. 6 Baylor	0
40	November 11, 1950	Waco, TX	No. 5 Texas	27	Baylor	20
41	November 10, 1951	Austin, TX	No. 16 Baylor	18	No. 10 Texas	6
42	November 8, 1952	Waco, TX	No. 13 Texas	35	Baylor	33
43	November 7, 1953	Austin, TX	No. 19 Texas	21	No. 3 Baylor	20
44	November 6, 1954	Waco, TX	No. 20 Baylor	13	Texas	7
45	November 5, 1955	Austin, TX	Texas	21	Baylor	20
46	November 10, 1956	Waco, TX	Baylor	10	Texas	7
47	November 9, 1957	Austin, TX	Tie	7	Tie	7
48	November 8, 1958	Waco, TX	Texas	20	Baylor	15
49	November 7, 1959	Austin, TX	No. 3 Texas	13	Baylor	12
50	November 5, 1960	Waco, TX	Texas	12	No. 11 Baylor	7
51	November 11, 1961	Austin, TX	No. 1 Texas	33	Baylor	7
52	November 10, 1962	Waco, TX	No. 5 Texas	27	Baylor	12
53	November 9, 1963	Austin, TX	No. 1 Texas	7	Baylor	0
54	November 7, 1964	Waco, TX	No. 6 Texas	20	Baylor	14
55	November 6, 1965	Austin, TX	Texas	35	Baylor	14
56	November 5, 1966	Waco, TX	Texas	26	Baylor	14
57	November 11, 1967	Austin, TX	Texas	24	Baylor	0

No.	Date	Location	Winning team		Losing team	
58	November 9, 1968	Waco, TX	No. 10 Texas	47	Baylor	26
59	November 8, 1969	Austin, TX	No. 2 Texas	56	Baylor	14
60	November 7, 1970	Waco, TX	No. 1 Texas	21	Baylor	14
61	November 6, 1971	Austin, TX	No. 15 Texas	24	Baylor	0
62	November 11, 1972	Waco, TX	No. 9 Texas	17	Baylor	3
63	November 10, 1973	Austin, TX	No. 13 Texas	42	Baylor	6
64	November 9, 1974	Waco, TX	Baylor	34	No. 12 Texas	24
65	November 8, 1975	Austin, TX	No. 7 Texas	37	Baylor	21
66	November 20, 1976	Waco, TX	Baylor	20	Texas	10
67	November 19, 1977	Austin, TX	No. 1 Texas	29	Baylor	7
68	November 25, 1978	Waco, TX	Baylor	38	No. 9 Texas	14
69	November 24, 1979	Austin, TX	No. 6 Texas	13	No. 17 Baylor	0
70	November 22, 1980	Waco, TX	No. 11 Baylor	16	No. 20 Texas	0
71	November 21, 1981	Austin, TX	No. 8 Texas	34	Baylor	12
72	November 20, 1982	Waco, TX	No. 17 Texas	31	Baylor	23
73	November 19, 1983	Austin, TX	No. 2 Texas	24	Baylor	21
74	November 24, 1984	Waco, TX	Baylor	24	No. 6 Texas	10
75	November 23, 1985	Austin, TX	Texas	17	No. 15 Baylor	10
76	November 22, 1986	Waco, TX	No. 17 Baylor	18	Texas	13
77	November 21, 1987	Austin, TX	Texas	34	Baylor	16
78	November 19, 1988	Waco, TX	Baylor	17	Texas	14
79	November 25, 1989	Austin, TX	Baylor	50	Texas	7
80	November 24, 1990	Waco, TX	No. 6 Texas	23	Baylor	13
81	November 23, 1991	Austin, TX	Baylor	21	Texas	11
82	November 21, 1992	Waco, TX	Baylor	21	Texas	20
83	November 20, 1993	Austin, TX	Texas	21	Baylor	13
84	November 24, 1994	Waco, TX	Texas	63	Baylor	35
85	November 23, 1995	Austin, TX	No. 9 Texas	21	Baylor	13
86	November 2, 1996	Austin, TX	Texas	28	Baylor	23
87	November 1, 1997	Waco, TX	Baylor	23	Texas	21
88	October 24, 1998	Austin, TX	Texas	30	Baylor	20
89	September 25, 1999	Waco, TX	No. 22 Texas	62	Baylor	0
90	October 28, 2000	Austin, TX	No. 22 Texas	48	Baylor	14
91	November 3, 2001	Waco, TX	No. 5 Texas	49	Baylor	10
92	November 9, 2002	Austin, TX	No. 4 Texas	41	Baylor	0
93	October 25, 2003	Waco, TX	No. 19 Texas	56	Baylor	0
94	October 2, 2004	Austin, TX	No. 5 Texas	44	Baylor	14
95	November 5, 2005	Waco, TX	No. 2 Texas	62	Baylor	0
96	October 14, 2006	Austin, TX	No. 6 Texas	63	Baylor	31
97	October 20, 2007	Waco, TX	No. 19 Texas	31	Baylor	10
98	November 8, 2008	Austin, TX	No. 5 Texas	45	Baylor	21
99	November 14, 2009	Waco, TX	No. 2 Texas	47	Baylor	14
100	October 30, 2010	Austin, TX	No. 25 Baylor	30	Texas	22
101	December 3, 2011	Waco, TX	No. 19 Baylor	48	No. 22 Texas	24
102	October 20, 2012	Austin, TX	Texas	56	Baylor	50
103	December 7, 2013	Waco, TX	No. 9 Baylor	30	No. 25 Texas	10
104	October 4, 2014	Austin, TX	No. 7 Baylor	28	Texas	7
105	December 5, 2015	Waco, TX	Texas	23	No. 12 Baylor	17
106	October 29, 2016	Austin, TX	Texas	35	No. 8 Baylor	34
107	October 28, 2017	Waco, TX	Texas	38	Baylor	7
108	October 13, 2018	Austin, TX	No. 9 Texas	23	Baylor	17
109	November 23, 2019	Waco, TX	No. 10 Baylor	24	Texas	10
110	October 24, 2020	Austin, TX	Texas	27	Baylor	16
111	October 30, 2021	Waco, TX	No. 16 Baylor	31	Texas	24
112	November 25, 2022	Austin, TX	No. 23 Texas	38	Baylor	27
113	September 23, 2023	Waco, TX	No. 3 Texas	38	Baylor	6
Series: Texas leads 81–28–4

=== Results by location ===
As of September 23, 2025

City	Games	Texas victories	Baylor victories	Ties
Austin	60	48	10	2
Waco	53	33	18	2

== See also ==
- List of NCAA college football rivalry games
- List of most-played college football series in NCAA Division I
