= Iowa State–Missouri football rivalry =

American college football rivalry

- Iowa State Cyclones Missouri Tigers
- First meeting: October 2, 1896; Iowa State, 12–0
- Latest meeting: October 15, 2011; Missouri, 52–17
- Trophy: Telephone Trophy

Statistics
- Total meetings: 104
- All-time series: Missouri leads, 61–34–9
- Largest victory: Missouri, 49–7 (1948)
- Longest win streak: Missouri, 10 (1956–1965)
- Current win streak: Missouri, 5

Locations of Iowa State and Missouri

The Iowa State–Missouri football rivalry was an American college football rivalry between the Iowa State Cyclones football team of Iowa State University and Missouri Tigers football team of the University of Missouri. From 1959 onward the Telephone Trophy was awarded to the victorious squad.

After the 2011 game, Missouri joined the Southeastern Conference, thus putting the rivalry at an indefinite pause.

== Telephone Trophy ==
The Telephone Trophy consists of an old rotary telephone that sits atop a tall wooden base. The receiver of the telephone is painted half gold and half red (gold for Missouri and red for Iowa State). A large metal plate on the base of the trophy shows the complete results for each Telephone Trophy game.

== History ==
Before the 1959 match-up between the two schools, which took place in Ames, Iowa, field testing showed that the telephones the two schools used to communicate with their coaches in the coaches box were wired so that either school could hear what was happening on the other sideline. The problem was fixed before the game, but neither of the two coaches knew that.

Northwestern Bell Telephone Company of Ames then decided to have a trophy made to commemorate the incident, and thus the Telephone Trophy was born.

An odd sidelight to the whole affair was that the same event unfolded for Missouri the following season in a game played in Columbia, Missouri. The 1960 game, which took place at Memorial Stadium, had similar problems.

== Game results ==
Iowa State victories	Missouri victories	Tie games

No.	Date	Location	Winner	Score
1	October 2, 1896	Columbia	Iowa Agricultural	12–0
2	October 31, 1908	Columbia	Iowa State	16–0
3	October 23, 1909	Ames	Tie	6–6
4	October 22, 1910	Columbia	Iowa State	6–5
5	October 21, 1911	Ames	Iowa State	6–3
6	October 19, 1912	Columbia	Iowa State	29–0
7	October 25, 1913	Ames	Missouri	21–13
8	October 24, 1914	Columbia	Iowa State	6–0
9	October 23, 1915	Ames	Iowa State	14–6
10	October 21, 1916	Columbia	Tie	0–0
11	October 20, 1917	Ames	Iowa State	15–0
12	October 18, 1919	Columbia	Missouri	10–0
13	October 16, 1920	Ames	Missouri	14–2
14	October 15, 1921	Columbia	Missouri	17–14
15	October 14, 1922	Ames	Missouri	6–3
16	October 13, 1923	Columbia	Iowa State	2–0
17	October 18, 1924	Ames	Missouri	7–0
18	October 31, 1925	Columbia	Missouri	23–8
19	October 23, 1926	Ames	Missouri	7–3
20	November 11, 1927	Ames	Missouri	13–6
21	October 20, 1928	Columbia	Missouri	28–19
22	October 12, 1929	Ames	Missouri	19–0
23	November 8, 1930	Columbia	Missouri	14–0
24	October 24, 1931	Ames	Iowa State	20–0
25	October 22, 1932	Columbia	Tie	0–0
26	October 28, 1933	Ames	Iowa State	14–7
27	October 13, 1934	Columbia	Iowa State	13–0
28	October 26, 1935	Ames	Tie	6–6
29	October 24, 1936	Columbia	Missouri	10–0
30	October 30, 1937	Ames	Missouri	12–0
31	October 15, 1938	Columbia	Iowa State	16–13
32	October 28, 1939	Ames	Missouri	21–6
33	October 19, 1940	Columbia	Missouri	30–14
34	October 18, 1941	Ames	Missouri	39–13
35	October 24, 1942	Columbia	Missouri	45–6
36	November 6, 1943	Ames	Missouri	25–7
37	October 21, 1944	Columbia	Tie	21–21
38	October 13, 1945	Ames	Missouri	13–7
39	October 19, 1946	Columbia	Missouri	33–13
40	October 25, 1947	Ames	#9 Missouri	26–7
41	October 23, 1948	Columbia	Missouri	49–7
42	October 22, 1949	Ames	#18 Missouri	32–0
43	October 21, 1950	Columbia	Tie	20–20
44	October 20, 1951	Ames	Iowa State	21–14
45	October 25, 1952	Columbia	Missouri	19–0
46	October 17, 1953	Ames	Iowa State	13–6
47	October 23, 1954	Columbia	Missouri	32–14
48	October 15, 1955	Ames	Iowa State	20–14
49	October 27, 1956	Columbia	Missouri	34–0
50	October 19, 1957	Ames	Missouri	35–13
51	October 25, 1958	Columbia	Missouri	14–6
52	October 3, 1959	Ames	Missouri	14–0
53	October 22, 1960	Columbia	#5 Missouri	34–8

No.	Date	Location	Winner	Score
54	October 21, 1961	Ames	Missouri	13–7
55	October 27, 1962	Columbia	Missouri	21–6
56	October 26, 1963	Ames	Missouri	7–0
57	October 24, 1964	Columbia	Missouri	10–0
58	October 23, 1965	Ames	Missouri	23–7
59	October 22, 1966	Columbia	Tie	10–10
60	October 21, 1967	Ames	#8 Missouri	23–7
61	November 9, 1968	Columbia	Missouri	42–7
62	November 15, 1969	Ames	#8 Missouri	40–13
63	November 14, 1970	Columbia	Iowa State	31–19
64	November 13, 1971	Ames	Iowa State	45–17
65	November 18, 1972	Columbia	#19 Missouri	6–5
66	November 17, 1973	Ames	Iowa State	17–7
67	November 16, 1974	Columbia	Missouri	10–7
68	November 8, 1975	Ames	#19 Missouri	44–14
69	October 16, 1976	Columbia	Iowa State	21–17
70	October 8, 1977	Ames	Iowa State	7–0
71	October 14, 1978	Columbia	#19 Missouri	26–13
72	November 10, 1979	Ames	Missouri	18–9
73	November 8, 1980	Columbia	Missouri	14–10
74	October 17, 1981	Ames	Iowa State	34–13
75	October 16, 1982	Columbia	Tie	17–17
76	October 29, 1983	Ames	Missouri	41–18
77	October 27, 1984	Columbia	Tie	14–14
78	November 2, 1985	Ames	Missouri	28–27
79	November 1, 1986	Columbia	Iowa State	37–14
80	October 17, 1987	Ames	Missouri	42–17
81	October 15, 1988	Columbia	Iowa State	21–3
82	November 11, 1989	Columbia	Iowa State	35–21
83	November 10, 1990	Ames	Iowa State	27–25
84	November 2, 1991	Columbia	Iowa State	23–22
85	October 31, 1992	Ames	Iowa State	28–14
86	October 30, 1993	Columbia	Missouri	37–34
87	October 29, 1994	Ames	Missouri	34–20
88	November 18, 1995	Columbia	Missouri	45–31
89	September 28, 1996	Ames	Iowa State	45–31
90	October 4, 1997	Columbia	Missouri	45–21
91	October 10, 1998	Ames	#21 Missouri	35–19
92	October 16, 1999	Columbia	Iowa State	24–21
93	October 28, 2000	Ames	Iowa State	39–20
94	October 13, 2001	Columbia	Iowa State	20–14
95	November 2, 2002	Ames	#22 Iowa State	42–35
96	November 29, 2003	Columbia	Missouri	45–7
97	November 27, 2004	Ames	Missouri	17–14
98	October 15, 2005	Columbia	Missouri	27–24
99	November 18, 2006	Ames	Iowa State	21–16
100	October 27, 2007	Columbia	#13 Missouri	42–28
101	November 15, 2008	Ames	#11 Missouri	52–20
102	November 21, 2009	Columbia	Missouri	34–24
103	November 20, 2010	Ames	#15 Missouri	14–0
104	October 15, 2011	Columbia	Missouri	52–17
Series: Missouri leads 61–34–9

== See also ==
- List of NCAA college football rivalry games
- List of most-played college football series in NCAA Division I
