= 1947 Boston Yanks season =

National Football League team season

- Head coach: Clipper Smith
- Home stadium: Fenway Park

Results
- Record: 4–7–1
- Division place: 3rd NFL Eastern
- Playoffs: Did not qualify

The 1947 Boston Yanks season was their fourth in the National Football League. The team improved on their previous season's output of 2–8–1, winning four games. They failed to qualify for the playoffs for the fourth consecutive season.

== Before the season ==
=== Draft ===
1947 Boston Yanks draft
Round	Pick	Player	Position	College	Notes
1	3	Fritz Barzilauskas	G	Yale	
2	13	Walt Heap	B	Texas	Signed with Los Angeles Dons (AAFC)
3	15	John Rapacz	C	Oklahoma	
4	25	Al Baldwin	E	Arkansas	Signed with Buffalo Bills
5	27	Carroll Vogelaar	T	San Francisco	
6	37	George Sullivan	E	Notre Dame	Played with Yanks in 1948
7	47	Joe Watt	HB	Syracuse	
8	57	Bill Chipley	E	Washington & Lee	
9	67	Gene Malinowski	B	Detroit	Played with Yanks in 1948
10	77	Bob Hazelhurst	HB	Denver	Played with Yanks in 1948
11	87	Alex Sidorik	T	Mississippi State	
12	97	Wally Roberts	E	Holy Cross	
13	107	Bob Sullivan	HB	Iowa	
14	117	Leo Long	B	Duke	
15	127	Frank Parker	T	Holy Cross	
16	137	Hugo Marcolini	B	St. Bonaventure	
17	147	Marion Shirley	T	Oklahoma City	
18	157	Roland Nabors	LB	Texas Tech	
19	167	Pat Kennelly	E	Southeastern Louisiana	
20	177	Darrell Waller	B	Washington State	
21	187	Paul Hart	B	Delaware	
22	197	Gene Lamoure	G	Fresno State	
23	207	Hank Kolaskinski	B	Wyoming	
24	217	Ed Heap	T	Texas	
25	227	John Polzin	G	TCU	
26	237	Dave Bloxom	B	TCU	
27	247	Odell Stautzenberger	G	Texas A&M	
28	257	Dick Chatterton	B	BYU	
29	267	Tom Rodgers	T	Bucknell	
30	277	John Prchlik	DT	Yale	
Made roster * Made at least one Pro Bowl during career

== Schedule ==
Game	Date	Opponent	Result	Record	Venue	Recap	Sources
2	September 29	**New York Giants**	**T** 7–7	0–0–1	Fenway Park	Recap	
3	October 5	Detroit Lions	**L** 7–21	0–1–1	Fenway Park	Recap	
4	October 12	**Pittsburgh Steelers**	**L** 14–30	0–2–1	Fenway Park	Recap	
5	October 19	at **New York Giants**	**W** 14–0	1–2–1	Polo Grounds	Recap	
6	October 26	at Chicago Cardinals	**L** 7–27	1–3–1	Comiskey Park	Recap	
7	November 2	Chicago Bears	**L** 24–28	1–4–1	Fenway Park	Recap	
8	November 9	at Los Angeles Rams	**W** 27–16	2–4–1	Los Angeles Memorial Coliseum	Recap	
9	November 16	at **Philadelphia Eagles**	**L** 0–32	2–5–1	Shibe Park	Recap	
10	November 23	**Philadelphia Eagles**	**W** 21–14	3–5–1	Fenway Park	Recap	
11	November 30	**Washington Redskins**	**W** 27–24	4–5–1	Fenway Park	Recap	
12	December 7	at **Pittsburgh Steelers**	**L** 7–17	4–6–1	Forbes Field	Recap	
13	December 14	at **Washington Redskins**	**L** 13–40	4–7–1	Griffith Stadium	Recap	
Note: Intra-division opponents are in **bold** text.

== Standings ==
NFL Eastern Division
	W	L	T	PCT	DIV	PF	PA	STK
Philadelphia Eagles	8	4	0	.667	6–2	308	242	W1
Pittsburgh Steelers	8	4	0	.667	6–2	240	259	W1
Boston Yanks	4	7	1	.364	3–4–1	168	256	L2
Washington Redskins	4	8	0	.333	3–5	295	367	W1
New York Giants	2	8	2	.200	1–6–1	190	309	L1

Note: Tie games were not officially counted in the standings until 1972.

== Roster ==
1947 Boston Yanks final roster
Quarterbacks: 22 Boley Dancewicz P; Backs: 10 Joe Golding RB/CB; 15 John Grigas FB/LB; 16 Howard Maley RB/QB/P; 17 Frank Maznicki CB/RB/K; 15 Jim Mello FB/LB; 8 Bill Paschal RB/CB; 11 Johnny Poto CB/RB; 19 Rudy Romboli RB/CB; 54 Frank Seno S/RB; 26 Walt Williams CB; Receivers: 38 Bill Chipley; 24 Hal Crisler DE; 29 Don Currivan S	Linemen/Linebackers: 35 John Badaczewski G; 36 Fritz Barzilauskas G/MG; 45 Rocco Canale DT/T; 65 Bill Collins G/MG; 44 Tom Dean T/DT; 34 Joe Domnanovich C/MLB; 40 Bill Godwin OLB/C; 42 Sam Goldman DE/WR; 31 Bill Kennedy MLB/G; 43 Bob McClure DE/G; 14 Mike Micka OLB/RB; 59 Tom Rodgers DT/T; 21 Joe Sabasteanski C/G/OLB; 27 Nick Scollard DE/WR/K; 61 Al Sidorik T/DT; 51 Carroll Vogelaar DT/T; 55 Jim Wright MG/G; rookies in italics
