= Nick Nicholson =

Nick Nicholson is the name of:

- Nick Nicholson (actor), American expatriate actor in the Philippines
- Nick Nicholson (American football), American football coach
- Nick Nicholson (singer), American country musician
- Bobby Nicholson, American actor, musician, and game show producer, often credited as "Nick Nicholson"
