= Win Williams =

American football player (1923–1992)

- Win Williams in 1946

No. 53
- Position: End

Personal information
- Born: March 10, 1923; Fort Towson, Oklahoma, U.S.
- Died: May 12, 1992 (aged 69); Houston, Texas, U.S.
- Listed height: 6 ft 2 in (1.88 m)
- Listed weight: 185 lb (84 kg)

Career information
- High school: Midland (TX)
- College: Rice (1942, 1946); Louisiana (1943)
- NFL draft: 1945: 15th round, 148th overall pick

Career history
- Baltimore Colts (1948-1949)

Awards and highlights
- Second-team All-SWC (1946)

Career AAFC statistics
- Receptions: 52
- Receiving yards: 626
- Touchdowns: 3
- Stats at Pro Football Reference

Dale Windell "Win" Williams (March 10, 1923 – May 12, 1992) was an American football player. He played at the end position for the Rice Owls (1942, 1946-1947) and Baltimore Colts (1948-1949).

== Early life ==
A native of Fort Towson, Oklahoma, he attended Midland High School in Texas.

== College career ==
He played college football for the Rice Owls and was named by the Associated Press (AP) to the 1942 Sophomore All-Star Team. He was a member of the 1946 Rice Owls football team that won the Southwest Conference championship and defeated Tennessee in the 1947 Orange Bowl. He graduated from Rice in 1948.

Williams as a member of the Baltimore Colts in 1948.

In Rice's 1946 upset over unbeaten Texas, Williams caught two touchdown passes, including the game-winning touchdown on a play that became known as the "Cyclone Fence Play" due to the dent created by Williams in the fence. He was named by the Associated Press as the national "lineman of the week" for his performance in the 1946 Texas game.

== Professional career ==
He was selected by the Detroit Lions in the 15th round (148th overall pick) of the 1945 NFL draft but did not play for the Lions. He played professional football in the All-America Football Conference (AAFC) for the Baltimore Colts during the 1948 and 1949 seasons. He appeared in a total of 26 AAFC games, five as a starter, and caught 52 passes for 626 yards and three touchdowns.

== Later life ==
After retiring from football, Williams entered the oil drilling business. He was shot to death in 1992 in what was reported to be an "apparent robbery" at his townhouse in Houston.
