= Bobby Layne =

American football player (1926–1986)

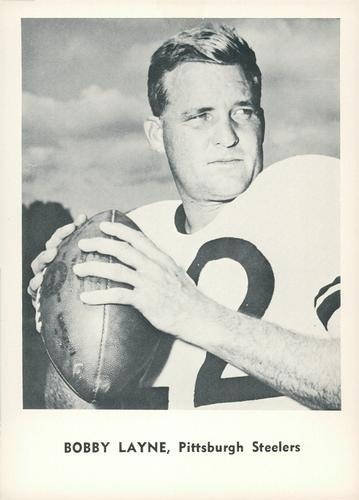
- Layne with the Pittsburgh Steelers in 1961

No. 22
- Position: Quarterback

Personal information
- Born: December 19, 1926; Santa Anna, Texas, U.S.
- Died: December 1, 1986 (aged 59); Lubbock, Texas, U.S.
- Listed height: 6 ft 1 in (1.85 m)
- Listed weight: 201 lb (91 kg)

Career information
- High school: Highland Park (University Park, Texas)
- College: Texas (1944–1947)
- NFL draft: 1948: 1st round, 3rd overall pick

Career history
- Chicago Bears (1948); New York Bulldogs (1949); Detroit Lions (1950–1958); Pittsburgh Steelers (1958–1962)

Awards and highlights
- 3× NFL champion (1952, 1953, 1957); 2× First-team All-Pro (1952, 1956); 4× Second-team All-Pro (1953, 1954, 1958, 1959); 6× Pro Bowl (1951–1953, 1956, 1958, 1959); 2× NFL passing yards leader (1950, 1951); NFL passing touchdowns leader (1951); NFL completion percentage leader (1955); NFL scoring leader (1956); NFL 1950s All-Decade Team; Pride of the Lions; Detroit Lions 75th Anniversary Team; Detroit Lions All-Time Team; Detroit Lions No. 22 retired; Pittsburgh Steelers Legends team; Pittsburgh Steelers Hall of Honor; Consensus All-American (1947); Second-team All-American (1946); NCAA passing yards leader (1946); 4× First-team All-SWC (1944, 1945, 1946, 1947); Texas Longhorns No. 22 retired

Career NFL statistics
- Passing attempts: 3,700
- Passing completions: 1,814
- Completion percentage: 49.0%
- TD–INT: 196–243
- Passing yards: 26,768
- Passer rating: 63.4
- Rushing yards: 2,451
- Rushing touchdowns: 25
- Stats at Pro Football Reference
- Pro Football Hall of Fame
- College Football Hall of Fame

Robert Lawrence Layne (December 19, 1926 – December 1, 1986) was an American professional football player who was a quarterback for 15 seasons in the National Football League (NFL). He played college football for the Texas Longhorns before being selected by the Pittsburgh Steelers with the third overall pick of the 1948 NFL draft and traded to the Chicago Bears. Layne played one season with the Bears, and then with the New York Bulldogs in 1949, the Detroit Lions from 1950 to 1958, and the Steelers from 1958 to 1962.

Layne was inducted into the Pro Football Hall of Fame in 1967 and the College Football Hall of Fame in 1968. His number 22 is retired by the Texas Longhorns and the Lions.

== Early life ==
Born in Santa Anna, Texas, Layne grew up on a farm in Coleman County just north of Santa Anna. His father, only 36, died of a heart attack when Layne was eight years old. His mother, Bea, was so destitute, she could not afford to keep the family together. Layne's two sisters stayed with his mother while he was sent to Fort Worth to live with his aunt and uncle, Mimi and Wade Hampton. The Hamptons eventually adopted Layne and moved to Highland Park, Texas, which was then a suburb just north of Dallas. He attended Highland Park High School in University Park. Layne's best friend and football teammate was fellow future hall of famer Doak Walker, the Heisman Trophy winner in 1948 for the SMU Mustangs and a pro teammate with the Detroit Lions.

In his senior year, Layne was named to the all-state football team, played in the Oil Bowl All-Star game, and led Highland Park to the state semifinals where they fell to eventual state champions San Angelo, 21–20.

== College football ==
One of the most successful quarterbacks ever to play for Texas, Layne was selected to four straight All-Southwest Conference teams from 1944 to 1947, and was a consensus All-American in his senior year. World War II caused a shortage of players, and rules were changed to allow freshmen to play on the varsity, thereby allowing Layne a four-year career.

Freshman play was sporadically allowed by various conferences during wartime, but would not be allowed universally until the rules were permanently changed in 1972. In his freshman season, Layne became a very rare player (in that era) to start his first game. He missed his second game due to an injury and was replaced by future North Texas transfer Zeke Martin, but Layne played the rest of the season and led the Longhorns to within one point of the Southwest Conference Championship when they lost to TCU 7–6 on a missed extra point.

Prior to and during his sophomore year, he spent eight months in the Merchant Marine, serving with his friend Doak Walker. He missed the first six games of the season, and was replaced by Jack Halfpenny. The last game he missed was the team's only loss, to Rice, by one point. Texas went 10–1, won the Southwest Conference, and despite playing only half a season, Layne again made the all-conference team.

In the Cotton Bowl Classic following that season, Texas beat Missouri 40–27, and Layne played perhaps the best game of his career. He set several NCAA and Cotton Bowl records that have lasted into the 21st century. In that game, he completed 11 of 12 passes and accounted for every one of the team's 40 points, scoring four touchdowns, kicking four field goals, and throwing for two other scores, thus he was named one of the game's outstanding players.

In 1946, the Longhorns were ranked first in the preseason for the first time, but after beating No. 20 Arkansas, they were upset by #16 Rice and later by unranked TCU. They went 8–2, finished third in the conference, ranked fifteenth nationally, and missed out on any bowl games. Layne led the Southwest Conference in total offense (1420 yards), total passing (1115 yards), and punting average (42 yards). Despite the unexpected finish, Layne was named All-Conference again and finished eighth in Heisman Trophy balloting to Glenn Davis of Army.

In 1947, Blair Cherry replaced Dana X. Bible as head coach at Texas and he decided to install the T-formation offense. Cherry, Layne, and their wives spent several weeks in Wisconsin studying the new offense at the training camps of the Chicago Bears and Chicago Cardinals of the National Football League. The change was a success, as Layne led the Southwest Conference in passing yards, made the All-Conference and All-American teams, and finished sixth in Heisman Trophy voting to John Lujack of Notre Dame. The Longhorns, after beating #19 North Carolina, started the season ranked third. They then beat No. 15 Oklahoma, but as happened in 1945, Texas was again denied an undefeated season by a missed extra point. After coming back once against Walker's No. 8 SMU, Texas again found itself behind late in the game.

Layne engineered a fourth-quarter touchdown drive that would have tied the game, but kicker Frank Guess pushed the extra point wide and the Longhorns lost 14–13. They fell to eighth, and finished behind SMU in the Southwest Conference, but gained an invitation to the Sugar Bowl, where Layne and the Longhorns beat number-six Alabama. As a result of his 10-of-24, 183-yard performance, Layne won the inaugural Miller-Digby award presented to the game's most valuable player. The Longhorns finished ranked fifth, the best finish in Layne's career. Layne finished 6th in Heismann voting that season as well. Layne finished his Texas career with a school-record 3,145 passing yards on 210 completions and 400 attempts and 28 wins.

Layne was one of the first inductees into the Cotton Bowl Hall of Fame and made the Cotton Bowl's All-Decade team (1937–1949) for the 1940s. Later, both of Layne's sons, Rob and Alan, played college football. Robert L. Layne Jr., was a kicker for Texas, playing on the 1969 national championship team, and Alan played tight end for TCU in 1973.

== College baseball ==
Layne was one of the best pitchers to ever play at Texas. He made the All-Southwest Conference team all four years he played, and played on teams that won all three Conference Championships available to them (none was named in 1944 due to World War II). He won his first career start, in 1944, when he was managed by his future football coach Blair Cherry, versus Southwestern, 14–1, in a complete-game, 15-strikeout performance. Similar to football, he missed the 1945 season because he was in the Merchant Marines, but returned to play three more seasons. In 1946, he threw the school's first and second no-hitters and posted a 12–4 record. In 1947, he went 12–1 and led Texas to a third-place finish in the first NCAA baseball Tournament.

In 1948, he went 9–0 and again helped Texas win the Southwest Conference, but though they qualified for it, Texas decided not to attend the 1948 NCAA tournament because the players felt they had too many obligations with family and jobs.

Texas went 60–10 overall, and 41–2 in the SWC during Layne's final three years in Austin. When his career was over, Layne had a perfect 28–0 conference record and set several school and conference records during his time on the team, including a few that still stand today. Between baseball and football, he was All-Conference an astounding eight times and won four conference championships.

In 1948, after earning his degree in physical education, Layne played a season of minor league ball for the Lubbock Hubbers baseball team of the Class C West Texas–New Mexico League. He went 6–5 with a 7.29 ERA, and had bids from the New York Giants, the Boston Red Sox, and the St. Louis Cardinals to join their staffs, but he preferred to go to the National Football League, where he could play immediately rather than grind out several years in the minor-league system.

== Professional football ==
Drafted into the National Football League by the Pittsburgh Steelers, Layne was the third overall selection in the 1948 NFL draft and was the second overall selection in the 1948 AAFC Draft by the Baltimore Colts. Layne did not want to play for the Steelers, the last team in the NFL to use the single-wing formation, so his rights were quickly traded to the Chicago Bears.

He was offered $77,000 to play for the Colts, but George Halas, who attended the Sugar Bowl victory over Alabama and sat with Cherry and Layne after the game, "sweet talked" him into signing with the Bears. He promised a slow rise to fame in the "big leagues" with a no-trade understanding.

After one season with the Bears in 1948, during which Layne was the third-string quarterback behind both Sid Luckman and Johnny Lujack, Layne refused to return and tried to engineer his own trade to the Green Bay Packers, while the Bears opposed a separate attempt by the Chicago Cardinals. Halas, preoccupied with fending off a challenge from the AAFC but also didn't want him to play for his rivals in the league, traded Layne to the New York Bulldogs for two draft picks and $50,000 cash to be paid in four installments, with a clause barring Layne from ever playing for the Cardinals:

After Charles Bidwill death his wife Violet had inherited $50,000 worth of Bears stock and she offered it to Halas in exchange for Layne. Although Halas and Charles Bidwill enjoyed a long friendship, the relationship between the two teams soured after Violet married Walter Wolfner, so Halas refused the deal and traded the future hall of famer to the Bulldogs for $50,000 and two draft choices. He also demanded a clause in the contract that Layne could never be sold or traded to the Cardinals. Halas took the $50,000 from the trade and bought off the stocks from Violet Bidwill.

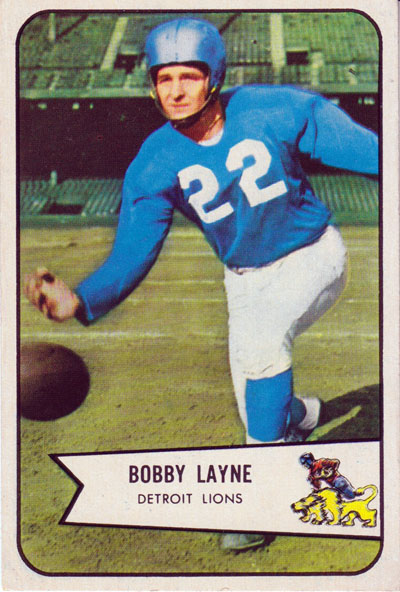
Layne on a 1954 football card

With Layne at quarterback, the Bulldogs won only one game and lost 11, but Layne played well and developed quickly. Layne compared one season with the soon-to-be-defunct New York Bulldogs as worth five seasons with any other NFL team.

In 1950, he was traded to the Detroit Lions for wide receiver Bob Mann, and the Lions agreed to make the final three payments to Halas (Halas later remarked that the Lions should have continued the yearly payments indefinitely to him in view of Layne's performance). For the next five years, Layne was reunited with his great friend and Highland Park High School teammate Doak Walker, and together they helped make Detroit into a champion.

In 1952, Layne led the Lions to their first NFL Championship in 17 years, and then did so again in 1953 for back-to-back league titles. They fell short of a three-peat in 1954 when they lost 56–10 to Cleveland Browns in the NFL championship game, a loss which Layne explained by saying, "I slept too much last night."

In 1955, the team finished last in their conference and Walker surprisingly retired at the top of his game. As Walker had been the team's kicker, Layne took over the kicking duties in 1956 and 1957, and in 1956 led the league in field-goal accuracy. In 1956, the Lions finished second in the conference, missing the championship game by only one game. In 1957, Layne broke his leg in three places in a pileup during the 11th game of the 12-game season. His replacement, Tobin Rote, finished the season and led the Lions to victory in the championship game in Detroit, a 59–14 rout of the Cleveland Browns.

After the second game of the 1958 season, Pittsburgh Steelers coach Buddy Parker, formerly in Detroit, arranged a trade on October 6 that brought Layne to the Steelers. During his eight seasons in Detroit, the Lions won three NFL championships and Layne played in four Pro Bowls, made first-team All-Pro twice, and at various times led the league in over a dozen single-season statistical categories.

Following the trade, Layne played five seasons with the Pittsburgh Steelers. Though he made the Pro Bowl two more times, he never made it back to the playoffs, and the team's best finish was second in the conference in 1962. During his last year in the NFL, he published his autobiography Always on Sunday. Later he stated that the biggest disappointment in his football career was having never won a championship for the Pittsburgh Steelers and specifically, Art Rooney.

By the time Layne retired before the 1963 season, he owned the NFL records for passing attempts (3,700), completions (1,814), touchdowns (196), yards (26,768), and interceptions (243). He left the game as one of the last players to play without a face mask and was credited with creating the two-minute drill. Doak Walker said of him, "Layne never lost a game...time just ran out on him."

Following his retirement as a player, Layne served as the quarterback coach for the Pittsburgh Steelers from 1963 to 1965 and the St. Louis Cardinals in 1965. He was a scout for the Dallas Cowboys from 1966–67. He later unsuccessfully sought the head coaching job at Texas Tech, his last professional involvement with the sport.

== NFL career statistics ==
Legend
	Won NFL championship
	Led the league
**Bold**	Career high

Year	Team	Games			Passing								Rushing					
Year	Team	GP	GS	Record	Cmp	Att	Pct	Yds	Avg	TD	Int	Rtg	Att	Yds	Avg	Lng	TD	Fum
1948	CHI	11	1	—N/a	16	52	30.8	232	4.5	3	2	49.5	13	80	**6.2**	18	1	3
1949	NYB	12	12	—N/a (Note: Although Layne started all 12 games for the Bulldogs, who went 1–10–1 during the season, he is not officially credited with that record by Pro-Football-Reference.)	**155**	299	51.8	1,796	6.0	9	18	55.3	54	196	3.6	27	3	10
1950	DET	12	12	6−6	152	**336**	45.2	2,323	6.9	16	18	62.1	56	250	4.5	30	4	**13**
1951	DET	12	12	7−4−**1**	152	332	45.8	2,403	7.2	**26**	**23**	67.6	61	290	4.8	**36**	1	8
1952	DET	12	11	**9**−2	139	287	48.4	1,999	7.0	19	20	64.5	**94**	**411**	4.4	29	1	5
1953	DET	12	11	**9**−2	125	273	45.8	2,088	7.6	16	21	59.6	87	343	3.9	23	0	8
1954	DET	12	8	6−1−**1**	135	246	**54.9**	1,818	7.4	14	12	77.3	30	119	4.0	34	2	2
1955	DET	12	10	3−**7**	143	270	53.0	1,830	6.8	11	17	61.8	31	111	3.6	19	0	4
1956	DET	12	12	**9**−3	129	244	52.9	1,909	7.8	9	17	62.0	46	169	3.7	20	**5**	3
1957	DET	11	7	4−3	87	179	48.6	1,169	6.5	6	12	53.0	24	99	4.1	21	0	3
1958	DET	2	1	0−1	12	26	46.2	171	6.6	1	2	48.7	3	1	0.3	4	0	2
1958	PIT	10	10	7−2−1	133	268	49.6	2,339	8.7	13	10	80.4	37	153	4.1	21	3	5
1958	Total (Note: Layne was traded mid-season to the Pittsburgh Steelers.)	12	11	7−3−**1**	145	294	49.3	**2,510**	8.5	14	12	**77.6**	40	154	3.9	21	3	7
1959	PIT	12	12	6–5–**1**	142	297	47.8	1,986	6.7	20	21	62.8	33	181	5.5	21	2	2
1960	PIT	12	9	5−4	103	209	49.3	1,814	**8.7**	13	17	66.2	19	12	0.6	13	2	1
1961	PIT	8	6	2–4	75	149	50.3	1,205	8.1	11	16	62.8	8	11	1.4	9	0	4
1962	PIT	13	11	7−4	116	233	49.8	1,686	7.2	9	17	56.2	15	25	1.7	17	1	7
Career		175	145	80−48−4 (Note: If the 1−10−1 record from his season with the New York Bulldogs was officially included in his career statistics, Layne's win–loss record would be an estimated 81−58−5.)	1,814	3,700	49.0	26,768	7.2	196	243	63.4	611	2,451	4.0	36	25	80
Source: Pro-Football-Reference.com

== Career highlights ==
=== Awards and honors ===
NFL

- 3× NFL champion (1952, 1953, 1957)
- 2× First-team All-Pro (1952, 1956)
- 4× Second-team All-Pro (1953, 1954, 1958, 1959)
- 6× Pro Bowl (1951–1953, 1956, 1958, 1959)
- 2× NFL passing yards leader (1950, 1951)
- NFL passing touchdowns leader (1951)
- NFL completion percentage leader (1955)
- NFL scoring leader (1956)
- NFL 1950s All-Decade Team
- Pride of the Lions
- Detroit Lions 75th Anniversary Team
- Detroit Lions All-Time Team
- Detroit Lions No. 22 retired
- Pittsburgh Steelers Legends team
- Pittsburgh Steelers Hall of Honor

College

- Consensus All-American (1947)
- Second-team All-American (1946)
- NCAA passing yards leader (1946)
- 4× First-team All-SWC (1944, 1945, 1946, 1947)
- Texas Longhorns No. 22 retired

=== Records ===
==== College football ====
- NCAA & Cotton Bowl – Most touchdowns responsible for, bowl game (6), tied by Chuck Long in 1984, Dan LeFevour in 2007 and Paul Smith in 2008
- NCAA & Cotton Bowl – Most points responsible for, bowl game (40)
- NCAA – Highest completion rate (min. 10 attempts), bowl game (0.917), surpassed by Mike Bobo in 1998
- NCAA – Most points scored, bowl game (28), surpassed by Barry Sanders in 1988
- UT – Most Pass attempts, career (400), surpassed by Bret Stafford in 1986
- UT – Most Pass completions, career (210), surpassed by Stafford in 1986
- UT – Passing Yards, career (3,145), surpassed by Stafford in 1986
- UT – Lowest percentage of passes intercepted (minimum 300 passes), career (7.8%), surpassed by Donnie Little in 1981
- UT – Most starts, career (34), surpassed by Marty Akins in 1975
- UT – Best winning percentage (minimum 1 season), career (80.5%), surpassed by T Jones in 1952
- UT – Most quarterback victories, career (28), surpassed by Vince Young in 2005
- UT – Most touchdowns, game (4), tied by Jim Bertelsen in 1969, Steve Worster in 1970, Earl Campbell in 1977 and A.J. "Jam" Jones in 1979; surpassed by Ricky Williams in 1997
- UT – Most touchdown passes, career (25), surpassed by Peter Gardere in 1992
- UT – Most points scored, game (28), broke his own record of 24 set earlier that year, surpassed by Williams in 1997
- Cotton Bowl – Most consecutive completions, game (8), tied by Tony Graziani in 1996 and Clint Stoerner in 2000
- Cotton Bowl – Highest completion rate (min. 10 attempts), game (0.917)
- Cotton Bowl – Most points scored, game and career (28)
- Cotton Bowl – Most touchdowns, game & career (4), tied by Tony Temple in 2008
- Cotton Bowl – Most points responsible for, career (40)
- Cotton Bowl – Most touchdowns responsible for, game & career (6)
- Cotton Bowl – Most points rushing, game (18), surpassed by Temple in 2008
- Cotton Bowl – Most touchdowns rushing, game (3), tied by Dicky Maegle in 1954 and Jim Brown in 1957, surpassed by Temple in 2008
- Cotton Bowl – Most touchdowns rushing, game (3), tied by Maegle in 1954, Brown in 1957, and Jim Swink in 1957, surpassed by Temple in 2008
- Cotton Bowl – Most yards per attempt (min 10 attempts), game (13.2), surpassed by James Street in 1969

==== College baseball ====
- **Southwest Conference & UT – Most conference victories, career, pitcher (28)**
- **Southwest Conference & UT – Highest conference winning percentage (min 10 decisions), career (1.000) (28–0)**
- **UT – Most runs scored, game (5), tied 11 times since**
- UT – Most shutouts, season (4), tied Bus Gillet, surpassed by Burt Hooton in 1969
- UT – Winning percentage, season (min 9 decisions) (1.00) (9–0), surpassed by Hooton in 1969
- UT – Most bases on balls, career (187), surpassed by Richard Wortham in 1976
- Southwest Conference & UT – Most strikeouts, season (134), surpassed by Hooton in 1969
- UT – Most strikeouts, career (386), tied by Hooton in 1971, surpassed by Wortham in 1976
- UT – Most strikeouts per nine innings pitched, career (10.78), surpassed by Hooton in 1971
- UT – Most wins, career (35), surpassed by Hooton in 1971
- UT – Highest winning percentage, career (0.921), surpassed by Terry Jackson in 1961
- UT – Most innings pitched, career (322.1), surpassed by Wortham in 1976
- **Southwest Conference & UT – Most no-hitters, season (2), tied by Hooton**
- **Southwest Conference & UT – Most no-hitters, career (2), tied by James Street, Hooton and Greg Swindell**
- **Southwest Conference & UT – Most consecutive conference victories (28)**
- Southwest Conference – Most strikeouts in conference play, season (84)

Bold means "active" record; as the Southwest Conference became defunct in 1996, these records have essentially become permanent

== After football ==
For his on-the-field exploits, Layne was inducted into a vast assortment of halls of fame. These included the Texas Sports Hall of Fame in 1960, the Longhorn Hall of Honor in 1963, the Pro Football Hall of Fame in 1967, the state halls of fame in Michigan and Pennsylvania, and the Texas High School Sports Hall of Fame in 1973. In 1981, he received the Golden Plate Award of the American Academy of Achievement presented by Awards Council member Tom Landry. He was presented alongside fellow honoree Doak Walker.

In 2006, he was a finalist on the initial ballot for pre-1947 inductees to the College Baseball Hall of Fame. He was a finalist again the following year.

In a special issue in 1995, Sports Illustrated called Layne "The Toughest Quarterback Who Ever Lived." In 1999, he was ranked number 52 on the Sporting News' list of Football's 100 Greatest Players. After retirement, Layne spent 24 years as a businessman back in Texas in Lubbock, working with his old college coach, Blair Cherry. His business ventures included farms, bowling alleys, real estate, oil, and the stock market.

In his younger days, he was often accompanied by Alex Karras, and was well known for his late-night bar-hopping and heavy drinking. It was said of him, "He would drink six days a week and play football on Sunday", and Layne would in fact drink during games - this heavy drinking may have contributed to his death.

Layne is reported to have stated: "If I'd known I was gonna live this long, I'd have taken a lot better care of myself." That line was later used by baseball player Mickey Mantle, a Dallas neighbor and friend of Layne's, who also died in part due to decades of excess alcohol consumption. Layne suffered from cancer during his last years.

=== Death ===
In November 1986, he traveled to Michigan to present the Hall of Fame ring and plaque to his old friend and teammate Doak Walker, but was hospitalized with intestinal bleeding in Pontiac after a reunion dinner with his former Detroit teammates. He returned to Lubbock on November 12, but three days later was hospitalized again. He died of cardiac arrest on December 1 in Lubbock and was buried there. Doak Walker and three other members of the Pro Football Hall of Fame were among the pallbearers.

"My only request," he once said, "is that I draw my last dollar and my last breath at precisely the same instant."

== "Curse of Bobby Layne" ==
In 1958, the defending NFL champion Lions traded Layne to the Pittsburgh Steelers in early October for Earl Morrall and two draft choices. Layne responded to the trade by supposedly saying that the Lions would "not win for 50 years."

While this story has been called a hoax, particularly because the quote was never published at the time, over the next half-century after this trade, the Lions had the sixth lowest winning percentage of any team in the NFL.

The Lions have had multiple consecutive losing seasons and have been swept by division rivals constantly, and are 3–14 in postseason appearances since their 1957 championship, the worst record of any team; their three playoff wins were over Dallas in 1991, and Los Angeles and Tampa Bay in 2023. They have played in only two NFC Championship games since their 1957 championship, in 1991 and 2023, with both being losses. In 2008, the last year of the supposed curse, the Lions lost all sixteen games.

As for the Steelers, they won the Super Bowl that year, as well as in their previous appearance (in Detroit) in 2006, and became one of the most dominant teams in the NFL, though this took place after Layne's career, winning six Super Bowls: 1974 (IX), 1975 (X), 1978 (XIII), 1979 (XIV), 2005 (XL) and 2008 (XLIII).

In the 2009 NFL draft, immediately after the supposed curse had expired, the Detroit Lions selected University of Georgia quarterback Matthew Stafford first overall. Stafford was an alumnus of Layne's former school Highland Park High School and lived in a house on the same street as Layne's. In 2011, Stafford's first full injury-free season, he led the Lions to their first playoff berth since 1999, but lost to Drew Brees and the New Orleans Saints.

In 2021, the Detroit Lions traded Stafford to the Los Angeles Rams for Jared Goff in a blockbuster trade. Stafford went on to win Super Bowl LVI in his first season with the Rams, while the Lions started the 2021 season 0–10–1, and eventually finished 3–13–1, the second worst record in the NFL.

Further, in the 63 years since the curse, the Lions also endured multiple playoff droughts lasting more than six years: including the year of the trade, the Lions did not make the playoffs for twelve consecutive seasons (1958–1969; 1971–1981; 1984–1990; 2000–2010).

In October 2022, Hall of Fame quarterback Peyton Manning – who once led his Indianapolis Colts to a blowout victory over the Lions on Thanksgiving Day in 2004 – dedicated an episode of his ESPN series Peyton's Places to the curse and its effects on the Lions. Manning placed a bathtub filled with whiskey (in place of water, owing to Layne's hard-drinking) and a cup of salt in an endzone at Ford Field to perform a chant over it with actor Jeff Daniels in an attempt to lift the curse. After starting their 2022 season 1–6, the Lions' performance notably improved after the episode aired; they won eight of their remaining ten games to end with a winning record, prompting speculation that Manning may have succeeded in lifting the curse. The following season the Lions won their first NFC North title, their first divisional title since 1993. On January 14, 2024, the Lions won their first playoff game since 1992 against the Los Angeles Rams and former Lions quarterback Matthew Stafford. The Lions then won a divisional round game against the Tampa Bay Buccaneers, marking the first time since 1957 that the Lions won two playoff games in a season. However, the Lions have yet to win a road playoff game since 1957. As of the end of the 2024 regular season, the Lions have a record of 34 wins and 10 losses (including playoffs) since the incantation was performed by Daniels and Manning at Ford Field. This led many to believe that the curse has been successfully lifted.

In the 2023–24 NFC Championship Game, the Lions held a 24–7 lead at halftime against the San Francisco 49ers, the team the Lions won their last conference championship against in 1957, and a mirror image of the 49ers' blown lead in that game. The Lions' defense gave up 27 unanswered points and failed to recover an onside kick as the 49ers won 34–31.

In the 2024 season, the Lions got out to their best record in franchise history since their inaugural 1934 season at 15–2, which included a franchise record win streak of eleven straight victories, winning every single regular season road game for the first time in franchise history, sweeping all their divisional rivals for the first time in franchise history, along with clinching only their second first round BYE and their first ever #1 seed. However, the team was decimated by injuries to 22 players (coinciding with the jersey number Layne wore while playing for the Lions), with the most notable injury being to star defensive end Aidan Hutchinson, who suffered a season-ending leg injury during the Lions' week 6 matchup against the Dallas Cowboys in Layne's home state of Texas, just seven days removed from the anniversary of Layne being traded to the Steelers. As a result of these injuries, the Lions were shockingly upset in the divisional round by the sixth-seeded Washington Commanders by a 45–31 score.

== See also ==
- List of NCAA major college football yearly passing leaders
- List of Texas Longhorns football All-Americans
- List of Chicago Bears first-round draft picks
- List of National Football League career passing touchdowns leaders
- List of National Football League career passing yards leaders
- List of National Football League career quarterback wins leaders
- Sports-related curses
