= 1946 SMU Mustangs football team =

American college football season

1946 SMU Mustangs football
- Conference: Southwest Conference
- Record: 4–5–1 (2–4 SWC)
- Head coach: Matty Bell (9th season)
- Captains: Lendon Davis; Eugene McClintock; Eugene Wilson
- Home stadium: Ownby Stadium, Cotton Bowl

1946 Southwest Conference football standings
	Conf.					Overall
Team	W		L		T	W		L		T
No. 10 Rice +	5	–	1	–	0	9	–	2	–	0
No. 16 Arkansas +	5	–	1	–	0	6	–	3	–	2
No. 15 Texas	4	–	2	–	0	8	–	2	–	0
Texas A&M	4	–	2	–	0	4	–	6	–	0
SMU	2	–	4	–	0	4	–	5	–	1
TCU	2	–	4	–	0	2	–	7	–	1
Baylor	0	–	6	–	0	1	–	8	–	0
+ – Conference co-champions; Rankings from AP Poll

The 1946 SMU Mustangs football team was an American football team that represented Southern Methodist University (SMU) as a member of the Southwest Conference (SWC) during the 1946 college football season. In their ninth season under head coach Matty Bell, the Mustangs compiled a 4–5–1 record (2–4 against conference opponents) and outscored opponents by a total of 114 to 100.

End Gene Wilson and guard Jim Sid Wright received first-team honors from the Associated Press (AP) and United Press (UP) on the 1946 All-Southwest Conference football team.

SMU was ranked at No. 41 in the final Litkenhous Difference by Score System rankings for 1946.

The team played its home games at Ownby Stadium in the University Park suburb of Dallas.

== Pre-Seasone ==
SMU was picked to finish 4th in the Southwest Conference in a pre-season poll from 70 sports writer and radio commentaries.

== Schedule ==
Date	Opponent	Site	Result	Attendance	Source
September 27	at Temple	Temple Stadium; Philadelphia, PA	T 7–7	30,000	
October 5	Texas Tech	Cotton Bowl; Dallas, TX	L 0–7	30,000	
October 11	Oklahoma A&M	Cotton Bowl; Dallas, TX	W 15–6	28,000	
October 19	at No. 16 Rice	Rice Field; Houston, TX (rivalry)	L 7–21		
October 26	at Missouri	Memorial Stadium; Columbia, MO	W 17–0	> 20,000	
November 2	at No. 7 Texas	War Memorial Stadium; Austin, TX	L 3–19	34,000	
November 9	Texas A&M	Cotton Bowl; Dallas, TX	L 0–14	40,000	
November 16	at No. 17 Arkansas	Razorback Stadium; Fayetteville, AR	L 0–13	15,000	
November 23	Baylor	Ownby Stadium; University Park, TX	W 35–0	15,000	
November 30	TCU	Ownby Stadium; University Park, TX	W 30–13	17,000	
Rankings from AP Poll released prior to the game

== After the season ==
The 1947 NFL draft was held on December 16, 1946. The following Mustangs were selected.

Round	Pick	Player	Position	NFL club
6	40	Gene Wilson	End	Green Bay Packers
13	110	John Hamberger	Tackle	Philadelphia Eagles
17	154	Frank Pulattie	Back	New York Giants
