= Aubrey Fowler =

American football player (1920–1996)

No. 80
- Position: Halfback

Personal information
- Born: June 12, 1920; Hamburg, Arkansas, U.S.
- Died: February 29, 1996 (aged 75); Dumas, Arkansas, U.S.
- Listed height: 5 ft 10 in (1.78 m)
- Listed weight: 160 lb (73 kg)

Career information
- High school: Dumas
- College: Arkansas Tech; Arkansas (1946–1947)
- NFL draft: 1948: 18th round, 162nd overall pick

Career history
- Baltimore Colts (1948)

Awards and highlights
- Second-team All-SWC (1946)

Career AAFC statistics
- Rushing yards: 30
- Rushing average: 5
- Return yards: 57
- Stats at Pro Football Reference

Aubrey Fowler (June 12, 1920 – February 29, 1996) was an American football halfback. He played collegiately for the University of Arkansas in 1946 and 1947 and professionally for the Baltimore Colts in 1948. He was elected to the Arkansas Sports Hall of Fame in 1982.

== Biography ==
Robert Aubrey "Cobb" Fowler was born in Hamburg, Arkansas and graduated from Dumas High School in Dumas, Arkansas. A standout athlete in Dumas, Fowler played football and ran track for the Bobcats. Following high school Fowler attended Arkansas Tech University, playing football for the Wonder Boys. He was a member of the 1939 AIC Champion football team before being one of 104 students called into action for the 206th Coast Artillery of the Arkansas National Guard in January 1941.

While stationed at Camp Murray at Tacoma, Washington Fowler's fellow guardsman formed a football team named the Arkansas Travelers. The Travelers easily won their matchups against fellow Puget Sound area service teams, outscoring their opponents 279 to 6. Fowler was the leading scorer and PAT kicker for the team. The West Coast title game, known as the "Khaki Bowl", against the Moffett Field Flyers was cancelled by the military due to the attack on Pearl Harbor. Fowler was subsequently named the 1941 Greater Northwest Football Association Player of the Year.

Fowler transitioned to the U.S. Army Air Corps and flew 33 missions over Germany, France, Holland, Belgium and Poland as a bombardier on a B-17 bomber during World War II. After the war, he returned to Arkansas Tech in 1945 and lead the Wonder Boys to another AIC title as Tech outscored their opponents 311 to 6. Fowler scored 102 points during the 1945 season and in some sources led the country in scoring. He was named to the 1945 AIC All-Conference team following the season. Fowler still owns two Arkansas Tech records to this day. In the November 20, 1939 game against Arkansas State Teachers College (now known as the University of Central Arkansas), Fowler punted 27 times for 864 yards in what would turn out to be a 0-0 tie between the two teams.

Fowler then transferred to the University of Arkansas to play for the Razorbacks of the Southwest Conference. During the 1946 season the Razorbacks were SWC co-champions and played LSU in the Cotton Bowl Classic. Fowler led the team in passing, completing 18 of 40 passes for 320 yards, scoring, 28 points on three touchdowns and 10 PATs, punting, 64 punts for a 34.6 average, and punt returns, 22 returns for 247 yards (11.2 average). He also served as the team's punter and extra point kicker. The 1947 season saw the Razorbacks finish 6-4-1 and defeat William & Mary in the Dixie Bowl. He again led the Razorbacks in punting, 47 punts for a 36.0 average, and punt returns, 23 returns for 395 yards (17.1 average). Fowler still has a presence in the Razorback Record Book. He is currently second in punt return average in a season with 17.17, third in punt return yardage in a season with 395 yards in 1947, fifth in punt return average in a career with 14.27, sixth in punt return yardage in a career with 642 yards, and tied for eighth all-time in punts in a season (64 in 1946). Fowler also owns the ninth longest running play in Arkansas history with an 85-yard run against SMU in 1946 and the tenth longest punt return in school history with a 75-yard runback against North Texas in 1947.

Following his collegiate career, Fowler was drafted by the Philadelphia Eagles in the 18th round of the 1948 NFL draft. He would instead join the Baltimore Colts of the All-America Football Conference for the 1948 season. The Colts finished the season as the AAFC-East co-champions, losing to the Buffalo Bills in the playoffs. Fowler finished the season third on the team in interceptions for the year.

Fowler then left the Colts to enter the coaching profession. He taught for three years in the Pocahontas School District in Pocahontas, Arkansas before moving on to a career with the Arkansas Game and Fish Commission. Fowler retired to his hometown of Dumas, Arkansas before dying in 1996.
