= 1946 Texas A&M Aggies football team =

American college football season

1946 Texas A&M Aggies football
- Conference: Southwest Conference
- Record: 4–6 (4–2 SWC)
- Head coach: Homer Norton (13th season)
- Home stadium: Kyle Field

1946 Southwest Conference football standings
	Conf.					Overall
Team	W		L		T	W		L		T
No. 10 Rice +	5	–	1	–	0	9	–	2	–	0
No. 16 Arkansas +	5	–	1	–	0	6	–	3	–	2
No. 15 Texas	4	–	2	–	0	8	–	2	–	0
Texas A&M	4	–	2	–	0	4	–	6	–	0
SMU	2	–	4	–	0	4	–	5	–	1
TCU	2	–	4	–	0	2	–	7	–	1
Baylor	0	–	6	–	0	1	–	8	–	0
+ – Conference co-champions; Rankings from AP Poll

The 1946 Texas A&M Aggies football team represented the Agricultural and Mechanical College of Texas—now known as Texas A&M University—as a member of the Southwest Conference (SWC) during the 1946 college football season. In their 13th season under head coach Homer Norton, the Aggies compiled a 4–6 record (4–2 against SWC opponents), tied for third place in the SWC, and outscored all opponents by a total of 125 to 107.

Three Texas A&M players received honors from the Associated Press (AP) or United Press (UP) on the 1946 All-Southwest Conference football team: tackle Monte Moncrief (AP-2, UP-2); guard Odell Stautzenberger (AP-2, UP-2); and back Willie Zapalac (UP-2).

Texas A&M was ranked at No. 40 in the final Litkenhous Difference by Score System rankings for 1946.

The team played its home games at Kyle Field in College Station, Texas.

== Pre-Seasone ==
Texas A&M was picked 2nd the Southwest Conference in a pre-season poll from 70 sports writer and radio commentaries.

== Schedule ==
Date	Opponent	Site	Result	Attendance	Source
September 21	North Texas State Teachers*	Kyle Field; College Station, TX	W 47–0		
September 28	vs. Texas Tech*	Alamo Stadium; San Antonio, TX (rivalry)	L 0–6	23,000	
October 5	at Oklahoma*	Oklahoma Memorial Stadium; Norman, OK	L 7–10	27,000	
October 12	at LSU*	Tiger Stadium; Baton Rouge, LA (rivalry)	L 9-33	30,000	
October 19	TCU	Kyle Field; College Station, TX (rivalry)	W 14–0	20,000	
October 26	at Baylor	Municipal Stadium; Waco, TX (Battle of the Brazos)	W 17–0	19,000	
November 2	Arkansas	Kyle Field; College Station, TX (rivalry)	L 0–7	17,000	
November 9	at SMU	Ownby Stadium; Dallas, TX	W 14–0	40,000	
November 16	No. 14 Rice	Kyle Field; College Station, TX	L 10-27	32,000	
November 28	at No. 20 Texas	War Memorial Stadium; Austin, TX (rivalry)	L 7–24	48,000	
*Non-conference game; Rankings from AP Poll released prior to the game

== 1947 NFL draft ==
The 1947 NFL draft was held on December 16, 1946. The following Aggies were selected.

Round	Pick	Player	Position	NFL club
8	62	Monte Moncrief	Tackle	Green Bay Packers
19	166	Buryl Baty	Back	Detroit Lions
27	247	Odell Stautzenberger	Guard	Boston Yanks
29	266	Bob Tulis	Tackle	Detroit Lions
