= Hub Bechtol =

American football player (1926–2004)

No. 57, 54
- Position: End

Personal information
- Born: April 20, 1926; Amarillo, Texas, U.S.
- Died: October 22, 2004 (aged 78); Austin, Texas, U.S.
- Listed height: 6 ft 3 in (1.91 m)
- Listed weight: 202 lb (92 kg)

Career information
- High school: Lubbock (Lubbock, Texas)
- College: Texas Tech (1943); Texas (1944–1946)
- NFL draft: 1947: 1st round, 5th overall pick

Career history
- Baltimore Colts (1947-1949)

Awards and highlights
- 2× Consensus All-American (1945, 1946); First-team All-American (1944); 1946 Cotton Bowl Defensive MVP; 2× First-team All-SWC (1944, 1945); Second-team All-SWC (1946)

Career AAFC statistics
- Receptions: 19
- Receiving yards: 192
- Touchdowns: 1
- Stats at Pro Football Reference
- College Football Hall of Fame

Hubert Edwin Bechtol (April 20, 1926 – October 22, 2004) was an American college and pro player for the Texas Tech Red Raiders, the Texas Longhorns and the Baltimore Colts.

Bechtol was born in Amarillo, Texas, grew up in west Texas and went to Lubbock High School in Lubbock, Texas, where he lettered in every sport and met his wife.

== College career ==
Bechtol started his college career at Texas Tech in 1943 when, because of World War II, freshman were allowed to play and earned "little All-American" honors there. He then volunteered for the Navy in the V-12 program which took him to the University of Texas at Austin where he was a three-time All-American in 1944, 1945, and 1946. He became the first Southwest Conference player to receive three All-American honors and is, along with Russell Erxleben one of only two Longhorns to ever perform that feat. He was also all-southwest conference all three years.

Bechtol paired up with fellow All-American Bobby Layne to create one of the top quarterback-receiver duos in the country, but he was also a solid defensive player. He led the team in receiving in 1944 and 1945 and was also the team's leading scorer in 1945. In 1945 he helped the Longhorn win the Southwest Conference and the Cotton Bowl and finish ranked #10. In the Cotton Bowl against Missouri, he was named the defensive MVP while also setting a then school single game record with 138 receiving yards and another with a 56 yard reception, which was the longest reception by a Longhorn in a bowl game until 1960. In 1946 he helped the Longhorns finish the season ranked #15.

He also lettered twice in basketball while at Texas.

After his college career was over he played in the 1947 East-West Shrine Bowl.

He was named to the Texas Longhorn Hall of Honor in 1963 and elected to the College Football Hall of Fame in 1990.

== Professional career ==
Bechtol was drafted by the Pittsburgh Steelers in the first round of the 1947 NFL draft with the fifth overall pick; and by the Colts in the second round of the 1947 AAFC Draft, ninth overall. He signed with the Colts in 1947 and played for them for three seasons during which he played in 38 games and caught 19 passes for 192 yards and a touchdown. In 1948, he helped the Colts finish second in the AAFC East and go to the Eastern Division Championship, which they lost to the Buffalo Bills. When the Colts and Bills were merged prior to going into the NFL, Bechtol was released.

== Later life ==
After retiring from football, Bechtol returned to Austin to begin a career in the insurance and real estate business; became involved in politics, serving on the state Real Estate Center Advisory Board, the Texas Board of Pardons and Paroles, the Grand Jury Association of the State of Texas and the Austin City Council. He was involved in several civic associations included the Boy Scouts of America, the Chamber of Commerce, and was a founding member of both the Austin Aqua Festival and the West Austin Youth Sports Programs.

Bechtol died on October 22, 2004 in Austin, Texas, where he was buried.
