= Harold J. Fischer =

American football player and coach (1921–1996)

Biographical details
- Born: October 25, 1921; Austin, Texas, U.S.
- Died: October 5, 1996 (aged 74); Huntsville, Texas, U.S.
- Education: Texas

Playing career
- 1941–1942: Texas
- 1943: Southwestern (TX)
- 1944: Texas
- Positions: Guard, halfback

Coaching career (HC unless noted)
- 1945–1946: Cisco HS (TX)
- 1947–1955: Stephen F. Austin (assistant)
- 1956–1958: Stephen F. Austin

Administrative career (AD unless noted)
- 1956–1959: Stephen F. Austin

Head coaching record
- Overall: 12–17 (college)

Accomplishments and honors

Awards
- All-SWC (1944)

Harold Joe Fischer Sr. (October 25, 1921 – October 5, 1996) was an American college football player and coach He served as the head football coach at Stephen F. Austin University from 1956 to 1958, compiling a record of 12–17. Fischer as a guard and halfback for Texas Longhorns and the Southwestern Pirates in the 1940s. He was selected by the Washington Redskins in the eighth round of the 1944 NFL draft.

== Early life ==
Fischer attended Stephen F. Austin High School in Austin, Texas.

== College football ==
Fischer played college football at the University of Texas, lettering in 1941, 1942, and 1944. He helped Texas to go 8–1–1 with a No. 4 ranking in 1941 and then to go 9–2, win the Southwest Conference (SWC) championship and the 1943 Cotton Bowl Classic to finish ranked No. 11 in 1942.

In 1943, Fischer and seven other Longhorns were transferred to Southwestern University in Georgetown, Texas to take part in the United States Navy's V-12 Navy College Training Program. While he was in the United States Marines, Fischer was a starter on the 1943 Southwestern Pirates team that went 10–1–1 overall, attained the school's only ranking ever, dealt the 1943 Texas Longhorns their only loss of the season, and won the 1944 Sun Bowl. He was honorable mention All-American guard by the Associated Press (AP) that year.

Following a medical discharge from military service and after being selected by Washington Redskins in the eighth round of the 1944 NFL draft. Fischer returned to Texas for the 1944 season. Though considered a great guard, he was moved to a blocking back in 1944. He was honored on the 1944 All-Southwest Conference football team with a first team selection by the United Press (UP) and a second team selection by the AP as a blocking back. He was also named an All-American blocker. He finished his playing career in the 1945 East–West Shrine Bowl.

== Coaching career ==
After graduating from Texas, Fischer was appointed head football coach at Cisco High School in Cisco, Texas in 1945. In two years as Cisco, his teams went 10–8–1.

Fischer was hired as an assistant coach at Stephen F. Austin State Teachers College—now known as Stephen F. Austin State University—in 1947, where he served as line coach. In 1956, he succeeded Ted Jefferies as head football coach. In three seasons as head coach, he led the Lumberjacks to a 12–17 overall record, before resigning in early 1959. Fischer was served as athletic director at Stephen F. Austin for those three years.

== Death ==
Fischer later resided in Huntsville, Texas. He died on October 5, 1996.

== Head coaching record ==
=== College ===
Year	Team	Overall	Conference	Standing	Bowl/playoffs
Stephen F. Austin Lumberjacks (Lone Star Conference) (1956–1958)
1956	Stephen F. Austin	4–6	3–3	4th	
1957	Stephen F. Austin	6–4	5–2	3rd	
1958	Stephen F. Austin	2–7	1–6	T–7th	
Stephen F. Austin:		12–17	9–11		
Total:		12–17			
