= 1944 All-Southwest Conference football team =

American college football all-star team

The 1944 All-Southwest Conference football team consists of American football players chosen by various organizations for All-Southwest Conference teams for the 1944 college football season. The selectors for the 1944 season included the Associated Press (AP) and the United Press (UP).

== All Southwest selections ==
=== Backs ===
- Bobby Layne, Texas (AP-1)
- George Walmsley, Rice (AP-1)
- Norm Cox, Texas Christian (AP-1)
- Paul Yates, Texas A&M (AP-1)
- Bobby Coff, Texas A&M (AP-2)
- C. D. Allen, Southern Methodist (AP-2)
- Bill Scruggs, Rice (AP-2)
- Harold J. Fischer, Texas (AP-2)

=== Ends ===
- Mike Schumchyk, Arkansas (AP-1)
- Hub Bechtol, Texas (AP-1)
- Merle Gibson, Texas Christian (AP-2)
- Clarence Howell, Texas A&M (AP-2)

=== Tackles ===
- Clyde Flowers, Texas Christian (AP-1)
- Monte Moncrief, Texas A&M (AP-1)
- John Cooke, Texas Christian (AP-2)
- Jim Meletio, Southern Methodist (AP-2)

=== Guards ===
- H. J. Nichols, Rice (AP-1)
- Jack Sachse, Texas (AP-1)
- Damon Tassos, Texas A&M (AP-2)
- Henry Ford, Arkansas (AP-2)

=== Centers ===
- Jim Cooper, Texas Christian (AP-1)
- Harold Tate, Rice (AP-2)

== Key ==
AP = Associated Press

UP = United Press

Bold = Consensus first-team selection of both the AP and UP

== See also ==
- 1944 College Football All-America Team
