= John Hoffman (running back) =

American football player (1925–1987)

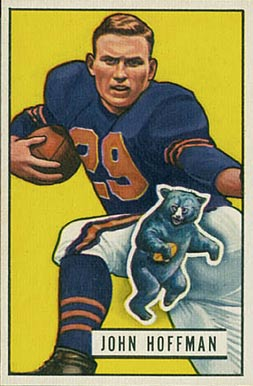
- Hoffman on a 1951 Bowman football card

No. 29, 89
- Positions: Halfback, fullback, end, linebacker

Personal information
- Born: December 8, 1925; Little Rock, Arkansas, U.S.
- Died: April 15, 1987 (aged 61); Little Rock, Arkansas, U.S.
- Listed height: 6 ft 2 in (1.88 m)
- Listed weight: 215 lb (98 kg)

Career information
- High school: Little Rock Central
- College: Arkansas
- NFL draft: 1949: 5th round, 49th overall pick

Career history
- Chicago Bears (1949–1956)

Awards and highlights
- 2× Pro Bowl (1953, 1955); Second-team All-SWC (1945)

Career NFL statistics
- Rushing yards: 1,366
- Rushing average: 4.3
- Receptions: 136
- Receiving yards: 1,870
- Total touchdowns: 17
- Stats at Pro Football Reference

John Wilks Hoffman (December 8, 1925 – April 15, 1987) was an American professional football player who was a running back for the Chicago Bears of the National Football League (NFL). He played college football for the Arkansas Razorbacks.

He made the NFL's Pro Bowl in 1954 and 1956. Hoffman was a Little Rock High School all-state football player in 1943–44 and All-State in basketball in 1944–45. He won four track events in the state meet in 1945. He joined the Bears in 1949, rushing for 1,366 yards and catching 135 passes in eight years. Hoffman retired at age 30 and became the England High School football coach.

== NFL career statistics ==
Legend
| **Bold** | Career high |

=== Regular season ===
| Year | Team | Games | | Rushing | | | | | Receiving | | | | |
| Year | Team | GP | GS | Att | Yds | Avg | Lng | TD | Rec | Yds | Avg | Lng | TD |
|---|---|---|---|---|---|---|---|---|---|---|---|---|---|
| 1949 | CHI | 12 | 6 | 53 | 216 | 4.1 | 27 | 1 | 25 | 373 | 14.9 | 64 | **2** |
| 1950 | CHI | 12 | 11 | 42 | 154 | 3.7 | 25 | 0 | 8 | 161 | **20.1** | 44 | **2** |
| 1951 | CHI | 12 | 10 | 1 | -3 | -3.0 | -3 | 0 | **28** | **394** | 14.1 | **78** | **2** |
| 1952 | CHI | 4 | 4 | 0 | 0 | 0.0 | 0 | 0 | 1 | 9 | 9.0 | 9 | 0 |
| 1953 | CHI | 12 | 10 | 32 | 95 | 3.0 | 34 | **3** | **28** | 341 | 12.2 | 40 | 1 |
| 1954 | CHI | 12 | 10 | 39 | 178 | 4.6 | 19 | 1 | **28** | 354 | 12.6 | 54 | 1 |
| 1955 | CHI | 12 | 9 | **94** | **454** | 4.8 | **47** | 0 | 11 | 153 | 13.9 | 37 | 1 |
| 1956 | CHI | 12 | 9 | 56 | 272 | **4.9** | 39 | 2 | 7 | 85 | 12.1 | 35 | 0 |
| Career | | 88 | 69 | 317 | 1,366 | 4.3 | 47 | 7 | 136 | 1,870 | 13.8 | 78 | 9 |

=== Playoffs ===
| Year | Team | Games | | Rushing | | | | | Receiving | | | | |
| Year | Team | GP | GS | Att | Yds | Avg | Lng | TD | Rec | Yds | Avg | Lng | TD |
|---|---|---|---|---|---|---|---|---|---|---|---|---|---|
| 1950 | CHI | 1 | 0 | **5** | **16** | **3.2** | **7** | 0 | 0 | 0 | 0.0 | 0 | 0 |
| 1956 | CHI | 1 | 1 | 1 | 3 | 3.0 | 3 | 0 | 0 | 0 | 0.0 | 0 | 0 |
| Career | | 88 | 69 | 317 | 1,366 | 4.3 | 47 | 7 | 136 | 1,870 | 13.8 | 78 | 9 |
