= Al Baldwin =

American football player (1923–1994)

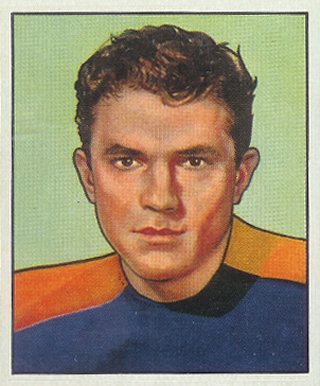
- Baldwin on a 1950 Bowman football card

No. 57, 19, 55, 89
- Positions: End, defensive back

Personal information
- Born: February 21, 1923; Hot Springs, Arkansas, U.S.
- Died: May 23, 1994 (aged 71); Hot Springs, Arkansas, U.S.
- Listed height: 6 ft 2 in (1.88 m)
- Listed weight: 201 lb (91 kg)

Career information
- High school: Hot Springs
- College: Arkansas (1943-1946)
- NFL draft: 1947: 4th round, 25th overall pick

Career history
- Buffalo Bills (1947–1949); Green Bay Packers (1950); Ottawa Rough Riders (1951–1952); Hamilton Tiger-Cats (1952–1953)

Awards and highlights
- Grey Cup champion (1951); Second-team All-American (1946); First-team All-SWC (1946); Second-team All-SWC (1943)

Career NFL/AAFC statistics
- Receptions: 160
- Receiving yards: 2,658
- Touchdowns: 25
- Stats at Pro Football Reference

Alton Baldwin (February 21, 1923 – May 23, 1994) was an American professional football player who was an end and defensive back in the All-America Football Conference (AAFC), National Football League (NFL) and Canadian Football League (CFL). He played college football for the Arkansas Razorbacks.

In his senior season as an end in 1946, Baldwin helped Arkansas win a share of the Southwest Conference championship, and played the LSU Tigers to a scoreless tie in the 1947 Cotton Bowl Classic. Baldwin was given 1st team All-SWC honors for his play that season. It was the first season for new head coach John Barnhill, and his teammate Clyde Scott would eventually be inducted into the College Football Hall of Fame.

He died from a stroke on May 23, 1994.

== NFL/AAFC career statistics ==
Legend
**Bold**	Career high

=== Regular season ===
Year	Team	Games		Receiving				
Year	Team	GP	GS	Rec	Yds	Avg	Lng	TD
1947	BUF	14	5	25	468	18.7	59	7
1948	BUF	13	13	**54**	**916**	17.0	58	**8**
1949	BUF	12	12	53	719	13.6	-	7
1950	GNB	12	12	28	555	**19.8**	**85**	3
Career		51	42	160	2,658	16.6	85	25

=== Playoffs ===
Year	Team	Games		Receiving				
Year	Team	GP	GS	Rec	Yds	Avg	Lng	TD
1948	BUF	2	1	**4**	31	7.8	**10**	**2**
1949	BUF	1	1	2	**54**	**27.0**	-	0
Career		3	2	6	85	14.2	10	2
