= 1946 Rice Owls football team =

American college football season

1946 Rice Owls football

SWC co-champion Orange Bowl champion

Orange Bowl, W 8–0 vs. Tennessee
- Conference: Southwest Conference

Ranking
- AP: No. 10
- Record: 9–2 (5–1 SWC)
- Head coach: Jess Neely (7th season)
- Home stadium: Rice Field

1946 Southwest Conference football standings
	Conf.					Overall
Team	W		L		T	W		L		T
No. 10 Rice +	5	–	1	–	0	9	–	2	–	0
No. 16 Arkansas +	5	–	1	–	0	6	–	3	–	2
No. 15 Texas	4	–	2	–	0	8	–	2	–	0
Texas A&M	4	–	2	–	0	4	–	6	–	0
SMU	2	–	4	–	0	4	–	5	–	1
TCU	2	–	4	–	0	2	–	7	–	1
Baylor	0	–	6	–	0	1	–	8	–	0
+ – Conference co-champions; Rankings from AP Poll

The 1946 Rice Owls football team was an American football team that represented Rice Institute in the Southwest Conference (SWC) during the 1946 college football season. In their seventh year under head coach Jess Neely, the Owls compiled a 9–2 record (5–1 against SWC opponents), tied with Arkansas for the conference championship, outscored all opponents by a total of 245 to 62, and were ranked No. 10 in the final AP Poll. They were invited to the 1947 Orange Bowl where they defeated SEC co-champion No. 7 Tennessee.

Rice ranked fifth nationally in total defense, allowing opponents to gain an average of only 166.3 yards per game. It also ranked fifth among 120 major college teams in scoring defense, allowing an average of 5.6 points per game.

Back Carl Russ led Rice and ranked 11th nationally with 690 rushing yards and an average of 5.31 yards per carry. Guard Weldon Humble was a consensus first-team All-American. Five Rice players received honors from the Associated Press (AP) or United Press (UP) on the 1946 All-Southwest Conference football team: Carl Russ (AP-1, UP-1); Weldon Humble (AP-1, UP-1); back Huey Keeney (AP-1, UP-1); tackle Charles Malmberg (AP-2, UP-1); and end Win Williams (AP-2, UP-2).

The team played its home games at Rice Field in Houston.

== Pre-Seasone ==
Rice was picked to finish 3rd in the Southwest Conference in a pre-season poll from 70 sports writer and radio commentaries.

== Schedule ==
Date	Opponent	Rank	Site	Result	Attendance	Source
September 28	LSU*		Rice Field; Houston, TX	L 6–7	26,000	
October 5	Southwestern (TX)*		Rice Field; Houston, TX	W 48–0	16,000	
October 12	at Tulane*		Tulane Stadium; New Orleans, LA	W 25–6	45,000	
October 19	SMU	No. 16	Rice Field; Houston, TX (rivalry)	W 21–7		
October 26	No. 3 Texas	No. 16	Rice Field; Houston, TX (rivalry)	W 18–13	30,000	
November 2	Texas Tech^{†}*	No. 8	Rice Field; Houston, TX	W 41–6	25,000	
November 9	at Arkansas	No. 5	Quigley Stadium; Little Rock, AR	L 0–7	17,000	
November 16	at Texas A&M	No. 14	Kyle Field; College Station, TX	W 27–10	32,000	
November 23	TCU	No. 12	Rice Field; Houston, TX	W 13–0	28,000	
November 30	Baylor	No. 13	Rice Field; Houston, TX	W 38–6	20,000	
January 1, 1947	vs. No. 7 Tennessee*	No. 10	Burdine Stadium; Miami, FL (Orange Bowl)	W 8–0	36,152	
*Non-conference game; ^{†}Homecoming; Rankings from AP Poll released prior to the game

== Rankings ==
Ranking movements Legend: ██ Increase in ranking ██ Decrease in ranking — = Not ranked
	Week								
Poll	1	2	3	4	5	6	7	8	Final
AP	—	16	16	8	5	14	12	13	10

== After the season ==
The 1947 NFL draft was held on December 16, 1946. The following Owls were selected.

Round	Pick	Player	Position	NFL club
14	120	Carl Russ	Back	Chicago Cardinals
25	230	Johnny Kelly	Back	Philadelphia Eagles
26	242	H. J. Roberts	Guard	Philadelphia Eagles
