= 1947 Cotton Bowl Classic =

- 11th Cotton Bowl Classic
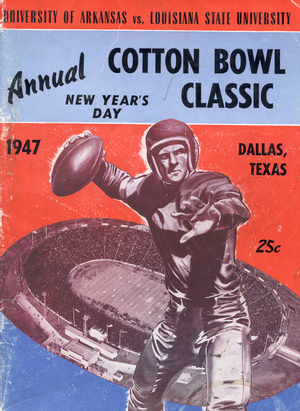
- Gameday program
Arkansas Razorbacks	LSU Tigers
(6–3–1)	(9–1)
SWC	SEC
0	0
Head coach: John Barnhill	Head coach: Bernie Moore
AP 16	AP 8
	1	2	3	4	Total
Arkansas	0	0	0	0	0
LSU	0	0	0	0	0
- Date: January 1, 1947
- Season: 1946
- Stadium: Cotton Bowl
- Location: Dallas, Texas
- MVP: End Alton Baldwin (Arkansas); QB Y. A. Tittle (LSU)
- Referee: Abb Curtis (SWC; split crew: SWC, SEC)
- Attendance: 38,000

The Cotton Bowl in Dallas, Texas, hosted the Cotton Bowl Classic.

The 1947 Cotton Bowl Classic was a post-season college football bowl game played on January 1, 1947 in the Cotton Bowl stadium at Dallas, Texas, between the Arkansas Razorbacks and the LSU Tigers. Due to adverse winter weather, neither team scored, and Arkansas and LSU tied the game, later referred to as Ice Bowl, 0–0. The two teams met again in the Cotton Bowl Classic in 1966.

== Setting ==
Arkansas and LSU had enjoyed a neighboring-state rivalry beginning in 1901, however, the two teams had not met since 1936, the end of a 23-year run of meetings in Shreveport. The 9–1 Tigers, led by quarterback Y. A. Tittle, were not invited to play in the 1947 Sugar Bowl, and instead matched up with the rival Razorbacks. Arkansas entered at 6–3–1, losing at Texas and Tulsa, versus Ole Miss, and tying Oklahoma A&M. The rain, sleet, snow, and ice from a winter storm would keep many members of the sellout crowd home, but 38,000 still showed up to watch the icy skirmish. Unused to the wintry conditions, the LSU team used oil drums filled with charcoal on the sidelines as makeshift heaters, while fans reportedly started fires in the stands to keep warm.

LSU was 1–3 in bowl games previous to the Ice Bowl. Arkansas, with their tie in the 1934 Dixie Classic, was 0–0–1, and 0–0–2 after their second indecisive bowl.

== Game summary ==
The Razorbacks were statistically beaten by the Tigers, who held a 15–1 advantage in first downs. LSU also held a yardage advantage of 271–54. The Razorback defense stiffened in the red zone, however, holding the Tigers off the board from 1, 6, 7, and 8 yards out. Despite the cold and bad conditions, the final two plays were very dramatic. Tittle threw a pass to Jeff Adams, who was running to the end zone, but Clyde Scott of Arkansas tackled him at the one. LSU was in position for a game winning field goal, but there was a bad snap, and the game ended with a tie.

Tittle was named the game's Most Valuable Player.
