= 1947 Orange Bowl =

American college football game

- 13th Orange Bowl
- Burdine Stadium in Miami, Florida, hosted the Orange Bowl.
| Rice Owls | Tennessee Volunteers |
| (8–2) | (9–1) |
| SWC | SEC |
| 8 | 0 |
| Head coach: Jess Neely | Head coach: Robert Neyland |
| AP 10 | AP 7 |
| | 1 | 2 | 3 | 4 | Total |
|---|---|---|---|---|---|
| Rice | 8 | 0 | 0 | 0 | 8 |
| Tennessee | 0 | 0 | 0 | 0 | 0 |
- Date: January 1, 1947
- Season: 1946
- Stadium: Burdine Stadium
- Location: Miami, Florida
- Favorite: Rice by 6
- Referee: John J. Lynch (SEC; split crew: SEC, SWC)
- Attendance: 36,152

The 1947 Orange Bowl was a postseason football game featuring the Tennessee Volunteers and the Rice Owls. It was won by Rice on the strength of a first-quarter touchdown and a safety on a bad snap during a Tennessee quick kick. Rice outgained Tennessee 246–145 and both teams combined for 9 turnovers.

The pageantry surrounding the game consisted of a halftime show in which over 10,000 balloons were released and an appearance by Generals Dwight D. Eisenhower and Howard McCrum Snyder. Eisenhower's group also consisted of his former Aide-de-camp Charles Craig Cannon and Coral Gables Mayor Tom Mayes. Eisenhower claimed publicly to be taking no sides, but was close friends with Tennessee coach General Robert R. Neyland.
