= 1945 All-Southwest Conference football team =

American college football all-star team

The 1945 All-Southwest Conference football team consists of American football players chosen by various organizations for All-Southwest Conference teams for the 1945 college football season. The selectors for the 1945 season included the Associated Press (AP) and United Press (UP).

== All Southwest selections ==
=== Backs ===
- Bob Nemir, Rice (AP-1, UP-1 [qb])
- Doak Walker, SMU (AP-1, UP-1 [hb])
- Rob Goode, Texas A&M (AP-1, UP-1 [hb])
- Bobby Layne, Texas (AP-1, UP-2 [fb])
- Huey Keeney, Rice (AP-2, UP-2)
- John Hoffman, Arkansas (AP-2)
- Sammy Pierce, Baylor (AP-2)
- Howard Maley, SMU (AP-2)
- Leon Joslin, TCU (UP-2)
- Jack Price, Baylor (UP-2)
- Preston Smith, Texas A&M (UP-2)

=== Ends ===
- Hub Bechtol, Texas (AP-1, UP-1)
- Gene Wilson, SMU (AP-1, UP-1)
- Dale Schwartzkopf, Texas (AP-2, UP-2)
- Bruce Bradbeer, Rice (AP-2)
- Joe Joiner, Baylor (UP-2)

=== Tackles ===
- Tom Dean, SMU (AP-1, UP-1)
- Monte Moncrief, Texas A&M (AP-1, UP-1)
- Leonard Dickey, Texas A&M (AP-2, UP-2)
- Jim Plyler, Texas (AP-2, UP-2)

=== Guards ===
- Nick Nicholson, Rice (AP-1, UP-1)
- Grant Darnell, Texas A&M (AP-1, UP-1)
- Norman Morrill, TCU (AP-2)
- Richard Johnson, Baylor (AP-2)
- Sam Callan, Texas (UP-2)
- Earl Cook, SMU (UP-2)

=== Centers ===
- Dick Harris, Texas (AP-1, UP-1)
- Earl Wheeler, Arkansas (AP-2, UP-2)

== Key ==
AP = Associated Press

UP = United Press

Bold = Consensus first-team selection of both the AP and UP

== See also ==
- 1945 College Football All-America Team
