= Al Sidorik =

American football player (1919–1980)

Alex Sidorik
No. 61, 49, 44
- Position: Tackle

Personal information
- Born: December 19, 1919; Hartford, Connecticut, U.S.
- Died: April 12, 1980 (aged 60); Middletown, Connecticut, U.S.
- Listed height: 6 ft 0 in (1.83 m)
- Listed weight: 248 lb (112 kg)

Career information
- High school: Weaver (CT)
- College: Mississippi State
- NFL draft: 1947: 11th round, 87th overall pick

Career history
- Boston Yanks (1947); Baltimore Colts (1948–1949)

Awards and highlights
- First-team All-SEC (1946)

Career NFL statistics
- Games: 33
- Stats at Pro Football Reference

Alexander Theodore Sidorik (December 19, 1919 – April 12, 1980) was an American professional football player who played at the tackle position. He played college football for Mississippi State and professional football for the Boston Yanks and Baltimore Colts.

== Early life ==
A native of Hartford, Connecticut, he played college football for the Mississippi State Bulldogs. In 1942, he was "an odds-on choice" by the Associated Press (AP) as a tackle on its all-star freshman-sophomore Southeastern Conference football team. The AP wrote that Sidorick performed brilliantly throughout the season and peaked in the Vanderbilt game for which he received "glowing notes from the press box as the outstanding lineman on the field." He served in the Army during World War II and attained the rank of captain.

== Professional football ==
He was selected by the Boston Yanks in the 11th round (87th overall pick) of the 1947 NFL draft. He played for the Yanks in 1947 and later in the All-America Football Conference (AAFC) for the Baltimore Colts in 1948 and 1949. He appeared in a total of 12 NFL and 21 AAFC games.

== Later life ==
After his playing career ended, Sidorik worked as an engineer for Pratt & Whitney. He died in 1980 in Middletown, Connecticut.
