= 1946 Baylor Bears football team =

American college football season

1946 Baylor Bears football
- Conference: Southwest Conference
- Record: 1–8 (0–6 SWC)
- Head coach: Frank Kimbrough (4th season)
- Captains: Olan Runnels; Wenzell A. Gandy
- Home stadium: Municipal Stadium

1946 Southwest Conference football standings
	Conf.					Overall
Team	W		L		T	W		L		T
No. 10 Rice +	5	–	1	–	0	9	–	2	–	0
No. 16 Arkansas +	5	–	1	–	0	6	–	3	–	2
No. 15 Texas	4	–	2	–	0	8	–	2	–	0
Texas A&M	4	–	2	–	0	4	–	6	–	0
SMU	2	–	4	–	0	4	–	5	–	1
TCU	2	–	4	–	0	2	–	7	–	1
Baylor	0	–	6	–	0	1	–	8	–	0
+ – Conference co-champions; Rankings from AP Poll

The 1946 Baylor Bears football team represented Baylor University in the Southwest Conference (SWC) during the 1946 college football season. In their fourth and final season under head coach Frank Kimbrough, the Bears compiled a 1–8 record (0–6 against conference opponents), finished in last place in the conference, and were outscored by opponents by a combined total of 181 to 56. They played their home games at Municipal Stadium in Waco, Texas. Olan Runnels and Wenzell A. Gandy were the team captains.

Baylor was ranked at No. 75 in the final Litkenhous Difference by Score System rankings for 1946.

== Schedule ==
Date	Opponent	Site	Result	Attendance	Source
September 21	Southwestern (TX)*	Municipal Stadium; Waco, TX	W 21–7	10,000	
September 28	at TCU	Amon G. Carter Stadium; Fort Worth, TX (rivalry)	L 16–19	16,000	
October 12	at No. 18 Arkansas	Razorback Stadium; Fayetteville, AR	L 0–13	12,500	
October 19	at Texas Tech*	Tech Field; Lubbock, TX (rivalry)	L 6–13	13,000	
October 26	Texas A&M^{†}	Municipal Stadium; Waco, TX (rivalry)	L 0–17	19,000	
November 9	No. 6 Texas	Municipal Stadium; Waco, TX (rivalry)	L 7–22	15,000	
November 16	at Tulsa*	Skelly Field; Tulsa, OK	L 0–17	12,000	
November 23	at SMU	Ownby Stadium; University Park, TX	L 0–35	15,000	
November 30	at No. 13 Rice	Rice Field; Houston, TX	L 6–38	20,000	
*Non-conference game; ^{†}Homecoming; Rankings from AP Poll released prior to the game

== After the season ==
The 1947 NFL draft was held on December 16, 1946. The following Bear was selected.

Round	Pick	Player	Position	NFL club
31	288	Bill Stephens	Tackle	Philadelphia Eagles
