= Damon Tassos =

American football player (1923–2001)

No. 6, 15
- Position: Guard

Personal information
- Born: December 5, 1923; San Antonio, Texas, U.S.
- Died: February 28, 2001 (aged 77); San Antonio, Texas, U.S.
- Listed height: 6 ft 1 in (1.85 m)
- Listed weight: 235 lb (107 kg)

Career information
- High school: Thomas Jefferson (San Antonio)
- College: Texas A&M (1943-1944)
- NFL draft: 1945: 3rd round, 20th overall pick

Career history
- Detroit Lions (1945–1946); Green Bay Packers (1947–1949)

Awards and highlights
- Second-team All-SWC (1944)

Career NFL statistics
- Games played: 55
- Games started: 43
- Interceptions: 5
- Stats at Pro Football Reference

Damon Gus Tassos (December 5, 1923 – February 28, 2001) was a guard in the National Football League (NFL). He was selected in the third round of the 1945 NFL draft (20th overall) by The Yanks and played with the Detroit Lions that season. After another season with the Lions he went on to play three more with the Green Bay Packers.
