= Climate of Dallas =

Dallas

Climate chart (precipitation, max. and min. temperature)
J	F	M	A	M	J	J	A	S	O	N	D
2.1 57 37	2.6 61 41	3.5 69 49	3.1 77 56	4.9 84 65	4.1 92 73	2.2 96 77	2.2 96 77	2.8 89 69	4.8 79 58	2.9 67 48	2.7 58 39
- █ Average max. and min. temperatures in °F
- █ Precipitation totals in inches
- Source: NOAA
Metric conversion
J	F	M	A	M	J	J	A	S	O	N	D
53 14 3	66 16 5	89 20 9	78 25 13	125 29 19	104 33 23	56 36 25	56 36 25	72 32 21	122 26 15	73 20 9	70 14 4
- █ Average max. and min. temperatures in °C
- █ Precipitation totals in mm

Dallas is located in North Texas, built along the Trinity River. It has a humid subtropical climate (Köppen climate classification: Cfa) that is characteristic of the southern plains of the United States. Dallas experiences moderate winters and hot summers.

== Seasonal climate ==
=== Summer ===
Summers are very hot and rather humid. Heat waves can be severe and prolonged, usually coinciding with severe drought. The city's all-time recorded high temperature is 113 °F (45 °C) during the Heat Wave of 1980. In July and August, the average high temperature is near 96 °F (36 °C), while the average nighttime low temperature is around 77 °F (25 °C). Days with temperatures exceeding 100 °F (38 °C) happen at least several times during the summer every year and dry summers occurred in 1980, 2011, 2022 and 2023.

=== Transitional months ===
Spring and autumn bring warm weather to the area. Vibrant wildflowers (such as the bluebonnet, Indian paintbrush and other flora) bloom in spring and are planted around the highways throughout Texas. Springtime weather can be quite volatile, but temperatures themselves are warm on average. The weather in Dallas is also generally pleasant between late October and early December, and unlike springtime, major storms rarely form in the area.

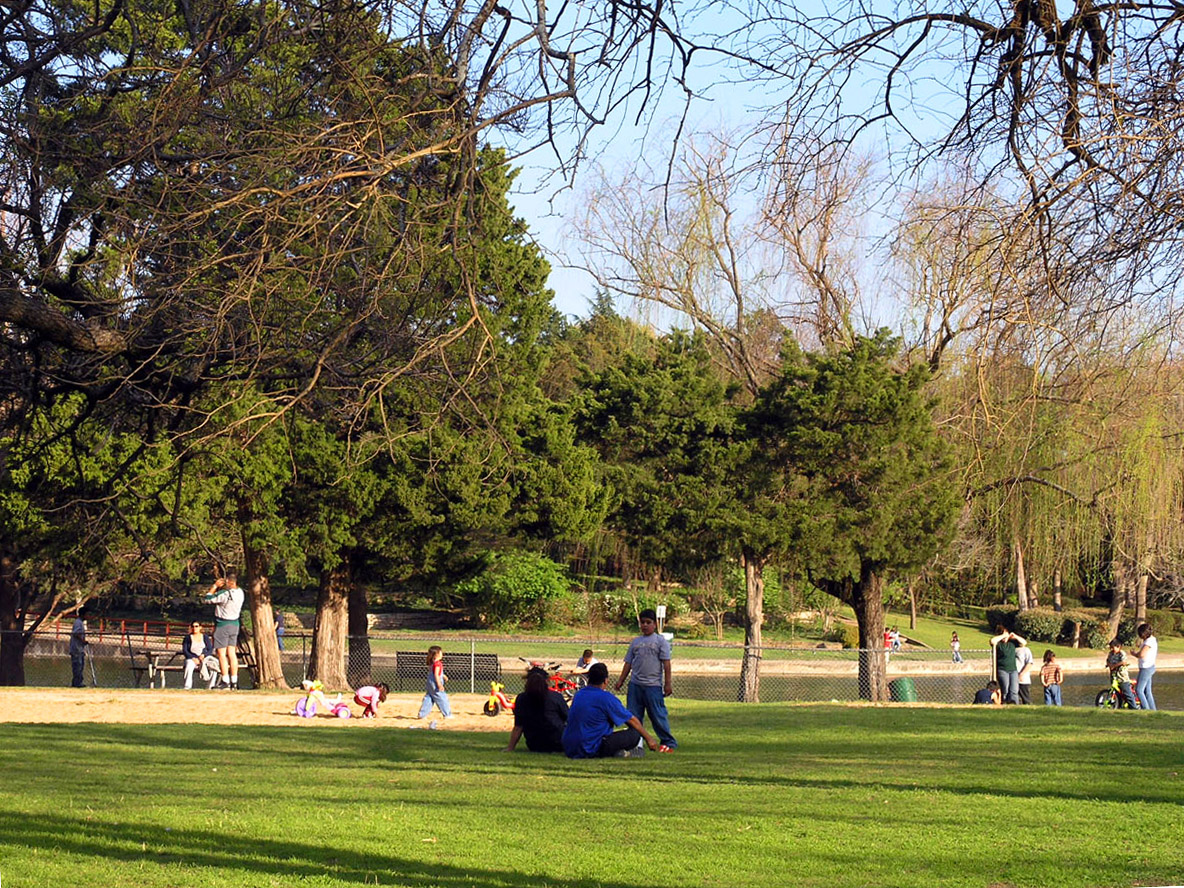
The spring and fall seasons are pleasant in Dallas, as seen in this March photograph from an Oak Cliff park

In the spring, cool fronts moving south from Canada collide with warm, humid air streaming in from the Gulf Coast. When these fronts meet over north central Texas, severe thunderstorms are generated with spectacular lightning shows, torrents of rain, hail, and occasionally, tornadoes (Dallas is located at the lower end of the Tornado Alley).

=== Winter ===
During the winter months of December to March, daytime highs as high as 76.7–85.9 °F (24.8–29.9 °C) are not unusual during warm spells. On the other hand, a Blue Norther can occur, bringing sudden and possibly-large temperature drops. During cold spells, high temperatures can lower to the 30s F., with low temperatures in the 10-20 F. range, rarely lower than that, for several days. A couple of times each year, warm and humid air from the south overrides cold, dry air, leading to freezing rain, which often causes major disruptions in the city if the roads and highways become slick. On average, even the coldest month of January is generally moderate, with an average high of 57.7 °F (14.3 °C) and low of 37.9 °F (3.3 °C). Based on 1991-2020 climate data, the average coldest temperature for an entire year is about 19.1 °F (−7.2 °C), placing Dallas in USDA zone 8b. The all-time recorded low is −3 °F (−19 °C) on January 18, 1930.

== Data ==
Climate data for Dallas (Love Field), 1991–2020 normals, (Note: Mean monthly maxima and minima calculated based on data at said location from 1991 to 2020.) extremes 1913–present (Note: Official records for Dallas were kept at the Weather Bureau Office in downtown from 15 October 1913 to August 1940, and at Love Field since September 1940.)
Month	Jan	Feb	Mar	Apr	May	Jun	Jul	Aug	Sep	Oct	Nov	Dec	Year
Record high °F (°C)	88 (31)	95 (35)	97 (36)	100 (38)	103 (39)	112 (44)	112 (44)	111 (44)	110 (43)	100 (38)	92 (33)	89 (32)	112 (44)
Mean maximum °F (°C)	76.7 (24.8)	80.5 (26.9)	85.9 (29.9)	89.0 (31.7)	95.0 (35.0)	98.9 (37.2)	103.6 (39.8)	104.1 (40.1)	99.1 (37.3)	92.5 (33.6)	82.9 (28.3)	77.9 (25.5)	105.5 (40.8)
Mean daily maximum °F (°C)	57.7 (14.3)	62.0 (16.7)	69.9 (21.1)	77.4 (25.2)	84.9 (29.4)	92.7 (33.7)	96.9 (36.1)	97.1 (36.2)	90.0 (32.2)	79.5 (26.4)	67.8 (19.9)	59.2 (15.1)	77.9 (25.5)
Daily mean °F (°C)	47.8 (8.8)	52.0 (11.1)	59.6 (15.3)	67.1 (19.5)	75.4 (24.1)	83.3 (28.5)	87.3 (30.7)	87.3 (30.7)	80.1 (26.7)	69.1 (20.6)	57.8 (14.3)	49.5 (9.7)	68.0 (20.0)
Mean daily minimum °F (°C)	37.9 (3.3)	41.9 (5.5)	49.4 (9.7)	56.8 (13.8)	66.0 (18.9)	73.8 (23.2)	77.7 (25.4)	77.4 (25.2)	70.1 (21.2)	58.7 (14.8)	47.8 (8.8)	39.8 (4.3)	58.1 (14.5)
Mean minimum °F (°C)	22.5 (−5.3)	26.5 (−3.1)	31.1 (−0.5)	41.3 (5.2)	52.0 (11.1)	64.2 (17.9)	70.8 (21.6)	69.4 (20.8)	56.8 (13.8)	42.0 (5.6)	31.2 (−0.4)	25.1 (−3.8)	19.1 (−7.2)
Record low °F (°C)	−3 (−19)	2 (−17)	11 (−12)	30 (−1)	39 (4)	53 (12)	56 (13)	57 (14)	36 (2)	26 (−3)	17 (−8)	1 (−17)	−3 (−19)
Average precipitation inches (mm)	2.59 (66)	2.78 (71)	3.45 (88)	3.15 (80)	4.57 (116)	3.83 (97)	2.54 (65)	2.31 (59)	3.10 (79)	4.79 (122)	2.93 (74)	3.23 (82)	39.33 (999)
Average snowfall inches (cm)	0.1 (0.25)	0.9 (2.3)	0.3 (0.76)	0.0 (0.0)	0.0 (0.0)	0.0 (0.0)	0.0 (0.0)	0.0 (0.0)	0.0 (0.0)	0.0 (0.0)	0.1 (0.25)	0.3 (0.76)	1.7 (4.3)
Average precipitation days (≥ 0.01 in)	7.0	6.9	8.1	7.3	9.4	7.3	4.9	5.1	5.6	7.2	6.5	6.9	82.2
Average snowy days (≥ 0.1 in)	0.4	0.5	0.2	0.0	0.0	0.0	0.0	0.0	0.0	0.0	0.1	0.3	1.5
Average relative humidity (%)	67.5	66.4	63.7	65.3	69.7	65.8	60.0	60.5	66.5	65.7	67.4	67.5	65.4
Average dew point °F (°C)	31.3 (−0.4)	35.2 (1.8)	42.6 (5.9)	52.0 (11.1)	61.0 (16.1)	66.6 (19.2)	67.6 (19.8)	66.7 (19.3)	63.3 (17.4)	53.2 (11.8)	43.7 (6.5)	34.7 (1.5)	51.5 (10.8)
Mean monthly sunshine hours	183.5	178.3	227.7	236.0	258.4	297.8	332.4	304.5	246.2	228.1	183.8	173.0	2,849.7
Percentage possible sunshine	58	58	61	61	60	69	76	74	66	65	59	56	64
Average ultraviolet index	3	5	7	9	10	10	10	10	8	6	4	3	7
Source 1: NOAA (sun, relative humidity, and dew point 1961–1990 at DFW Airport) (Note: Sunshine normals are based on only 24 years of data.)
Source 2: Weather Atlas (Average UV index)

See or edit raw graph data.

Climate data for Redbird Airport, 1991–2020 normals, extremes 1998–present
Month	Jan	Feb	Mar	Apr	May	Jun	Jul	Aug	Sep	Oct	Nov	Dec	Year
Record high °F (°C)	84 (29)	90 (32)	92 (33)	98 (37)	101 (38)	107 (42)	111 (44)	111 (44)	109 (43)	97 (36)	92 (33)	88 (31)	111 (44)
Mean maximum °F (°C)	77.7 (25.4)	81.5 (27.5)	85.5 (29.7)	88.6 (31.4)	92.9 (33.8)	99.3 (37.4)	103.3 (39.6)	104.7 (40.4)	99.1 (37.3)	92.3 (33.5)	84.1 (28.9)	78.9 (26.1)	105.7 (40.9)
Mean daily maximum °F (°C)	57.4 (14.1)	61.5 (16.4)	69.0 (20.6)	76.2 (24.6)	83.6 (28.7)	91.4 (33.0)	95.9 (35.5)	96.4 (35.8)	89.3 (31.8)	78.8 (26.0)	67.3 (19.6)	58.8 (14.9)	77.1 (25.1)
Daily mean °F (°C)	47.6 (8.7)	51.3 (10.7)	58.7 (14.8)	65.7 (18.7)	73.9 (23.3)	81.7 (27.6)	85.6 (29.8)	85.7 (29.8)	78.7 (25.9)	68.1 (20.1)	57.2 (14.0)	49.1 (9.5)	66.9 (19.4)
Mean daily minimum °F (°C)	37.8 (3.2)	41.1 (5.1)	48.3 (9.1)	55.2 (12.9)	64.2 (17.9)	72.0 (22.2)	75.4 (24.1)	75.0 (23.9)	68.2 (20.1)	57.5 (14.2)	47.1 (8.4)	39.3 (4.1)	56.8 (13.8)
Mean minimum °F (°C)	21.3 (−5.9)	25.1 (−3.8)	29.9 (−1.2)	39.8 (4.3)	49.9 (9.9)	63.4 (17.4)	69.1 (20.6)	68.0 (20.0)	56.5 (13.6)	40.5 (4.7)	30.6 (−0.8)	24.3 (−4.3)	17.4 (−8.1)
Record low °F (°C)	11 (−12)	−1 (−18)	16 (−9)	32 (0)	39 (4)	56 (13)	63 (17)	60 (16)	44 (7)	29 (−2)	22 (−6)	10 (−12)	−1 (−18)
Average precipitation inches (mm)	2.55 (65)	2.57 (65)	3.57 (91)	3.70 (94)	4.34 (110)	3.87 (98)	1.91 (49)	1.80 (46)	2.95 (75)	4.54 (115)	2.78 (71)	3.08 (78)	37.66 (957)
Average precipitation days (≥ 0.01 in)	6.0	7.1	9.2	7.9	10.0	7.5	4.7	5.6	5.6	7.1	7.0	6.8	84.5
Source 1: NOAA
Source 2: National Weather Service (mean maxima/minima 2006–2020)

== Snow ==
There are two to three days with hail per year, but snowfall is rare. Based on records from 1898 to 2019, the average snowfall is 6.6 centimeters (2.6 inches) per year. It has snowed twice during Thanksgiving day NFL football games at Texas Stadium, in 1993 and 2007, which is comparatively early. The month with the highest snowfall is typically February, with an average of 1.5 centimeters (0.6 inches) falling. While the month with the highest number of days with snow falling is typically January, with an average of 0.5 days of snow. The record snowfall was recorded in February 2010, when 31.75 centimeters (12.5 inches) of snow fell over two days at the Dallas-Fort Worth International airport.

== Volatile weather ==
=== Tornadoes ===
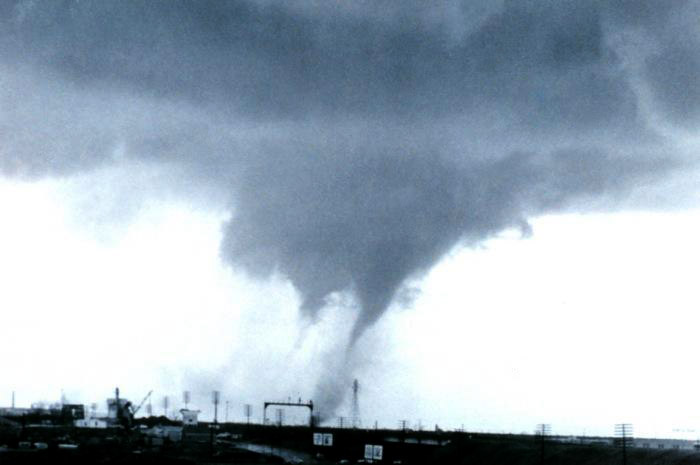
A multiple-vortex tornado outside of Dallas, Texas on April 2, 1957.

Since Dallas lies at the lower end of the "Tornado Alley", tornadoes have on occasion been a threat to the city. Most tornadoes hit the city during the months of April and May. Dallas was hit by a powerful tornado on April 2, 1957; the tornado was later rated F3. On March 28, 2000, the “Fort Worth Tornado” impacted Dallas's neighbor Fort Worth's downtown, and a tornado in Arlington, Texas also occurred that day damaging some homes. Four people died in Fort Worth as a result of the tornado. That day was the Metroplex's most damaging tornado outbreak since the 1957 event. Another widespread tornado outbreak struck the area in the Dallas tornado outbreak of April 3, 2012, slightly damaging Rangers Ballpark in Arlington and damaging some planes and grounding the others at Dallas/Fort Worth International Airport and Dallas Love Field, heavily damaging an elementary school, and destroying semis in a facility. On December 26, 2015, a rare winter tornado outbreak led to the spawning of several tornadoes, including an EF4 tornado near the city of Garland and Rowlett that caused 10 deaths. On October 21, 2019, 10 tornadoes touched down in the Dallas-Fort Worth Metroplex, including an EF3 tornado that devastated areas from North Dallas to Richardson.

=== Floods ===
Major flooding occurred on the Trinity River in the years 1844, 1866, 1871, and 1890, but a major event in the spring of 1908 set in motion the harnessing of the river. On 26 May 1908, the Trinity River reached a depth of 52.6 feet (16.03 m) and a width of 1.5 miles (2.4 km). Five people died, 4,000 were left homeless, and property damages were estimated at $2.5 million.

Now the wreckage of a shed or outhouse would move by, followed by a drowned swine or other livestock. The construction forces of the Texas & Pacific worked feverishly to safeguard the long trestle carrying their tracks across the stream. Suddenly this whole structure turned on its side down-stream, broke loose from the rest of the track at one end and swung out into the middle of the current and began breaking up, first into large sections and then into smaller pieces, rushing madly along to some uncertain destination. [Approximately half a dozen of the workmen fell into the torrent at this point; exaggerated reports of their drowning swept the city.]

— C.L. Moss,

Dallas was without power for three days, all telephone and telegraph service was down, and rail service was canceled. The only way to reach Oak Cliff was by boat. West Dallas was hit harder than any other part of the city—the Dallas Times Herald said "indescribable suffering" plagued the area. Much to the horror of residents, thousands of livestock drowned in the flood and some became lodged in the tops of trees—the stench of their decay hung over the city as the water subsided.

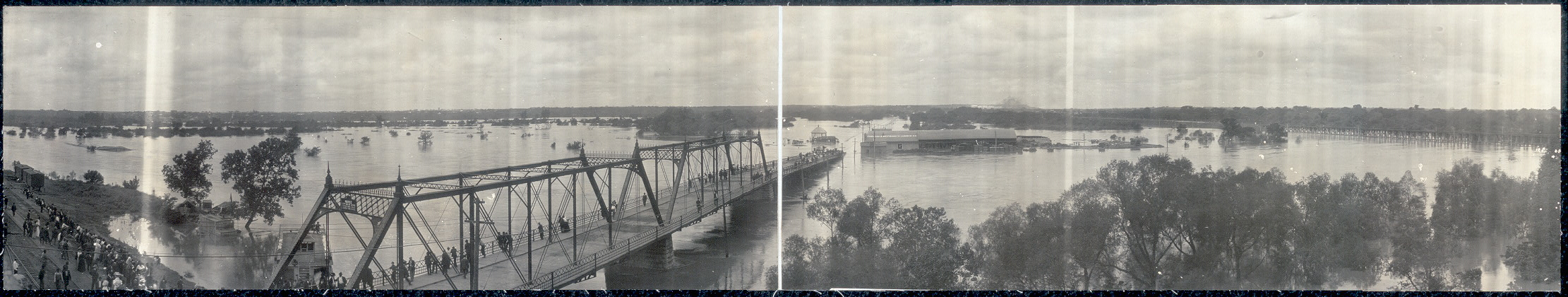
The Trinity River flooding on 8 July 1908.

After the disastrous flood, the city wanted to find a way to control the reckless Trinity and to build a bridge linking Oak Cliff and Dallas. The immediate reaction was citizens and the city clamoring to build an indestructible, all-weather crossing over the Trinity. This had already been tried following the 1890 flood—the result was the "Long Wooden Bridge" that connected Jefferson Boulevard in Oak Cliff and Cadiz in Dallas, but the resulting unstable bridge was easily washed away by the 1908 flood. George B. Dealey, publisher of The Dallas Morning News, proposed a 1.5 miles (2.4 km) concrete bridge based on a bridge crossing the Missouri River in Kansas City. Ultimately a US$650,000 bond election was approved and in 1912, the Oak Cliff viaduct (now the Houston Street Viaduct) was opened among festivities drawing 58,000 spectators. The bridge, at the time, was the longest concrete structure in the world.

In May 2015, the Dallas-Fort Worth Airport received a record-shattering 16.96 inches of rainfall, in a month that obliterated heavy-rainfall records virtually throughout the Southern Plains (Texas and Oklahoma, especially). Strangely enough, a very hot, dry summer followed, resulting in some parts of Texas returning to abnormally dry conditions as early as July 2015, soon after the record May rains erased years-long drought conditions over the area.

== El Niño–Southern Oscillation ==
The El Niño–Southern Oscillation (ENSO) determines for the most part what the winter and spring months are like in Dallas. During the warm phase (El Niño), winter and spring are colder and receive more snow than usual. Under the cold phase (La Niña), winter and spring are warmer and receive less snow.
