= Arkansas–LSU football rivalry =

American college football rivalry

Battle for the Golden Boot
- Arkansas Razorbacks LSU Tigers
- First meeting: December 6, 1901; LSU, 15–0
- Latest meeting: November 15, 2025; LSU, 23–22
- Next meeting: November 28, 2026
- Trophy: State Fair Stadium Dedication Game trophy (1924); Cotton Bowl Classic trophy (1946, 1965); The Boot trophy (1996–present)

Statistics
- Total meetings: 71
- All-time series: LSU leads, 44–23–2
- Trophy series: LSU leads, 19–9
- Largest victory: Arkansas, 51–0 (1910); LSU, 56–20 (2019)
- Longest win streak: LSU, 7 (1930–1936); Arkansas, 4 (1922–1925)
- Current win streak: LSU, 4 (2022–present)

Locations of Arkansas and LSU

The Arkansas–LSU football rivalry, formally known as the Battle for the Boot but more recently sometimes informally called the Battle for the Golden Boot, is an American college football rivalry between the Razorbacks of the University of Arkansas and Tigers of Louisiana State University. The first game between the Razorbacks and Tigers was played in 1901. With the admission of Arkansas as a member of the Southeastern Conference (SEC) in 1992, the rivalry became an annual game between these members of the SEC Western Division. "The Boot" trophy was first awarded to the game's winner in 1996. Like many rivalry games, the game is played during the final week of the college football season.

The game was traditionally played on the Friday after Thanksgiving, but this changed in the 2014 season when Texas A&M was scheduled to play LSU on Thanksgiving, while Arkansas was scheduled to play Missouri during rivalry week. In 2026, the game will return to Thanksgiving rivalry week for the first time since 2014, though on Saturday instead of Friday.

== History ==
=== Pre-Boot era ===
Arkansas and LSU began playing each other in 1901, with LSU claiming a 15–0 victory in Baton Rouge, Louisiana. Between 1906 and 1936 (with the exception of 1918, when LSU did not field a team due to World War I) and again 1953 and 1956, the two teams played each other during regular seasons on a yearly basis. With the annual LSU–Tulane game being suspended at times during the first decade of the twentieth century, the Arkansas–LSU series occasionally moved into its season finale slot (foreshadowing what would again happen starting in 1992). From 1913 to 1936, the two teams also played each other in the State Fair Classic, until Arkansas canceled its future appearances after dropping seven straight contests to LSU. After the 1914 season, Arkansas and LSU were invited to join the new Southwest Conference, but LSU declined. In 1924, the two schools became the first future SEC rivals to play for a trophy, as part of the dedication of Shreveport's new State Fair Stadium. In 1935, LSU purchased Sheik, its first live royal bengal tiger from the Little Rock Zoo and formally installed him as Mike I at the State Fair Classic against Arkansas the next year. In addition, the two teams played each other at the end of the regular season in the Cotton Bowl Classic twice, on New Year's Day of 1947 and 1966.

In 1992, LSU and Arkansas resumed their annual rivalry when Arkansas joined the Southeastern Conference after leaving the SWC. The teams played each other four times in the conference before the introduction of The Boot trophy in 1996. The Razorbacks won 30–6 in 1992—their first win in the series since 1929—and 42–24 in 1993, while the Tigers prevailed 30–12 in 1994 and 28–0 in 1995.

=== The Boot era ===
The Boot trophy is approximately 4 feet (1.2 m) tall.

LSU leads the trophy series 19–9, through the 2023 season. Since 1996, the winning team has received the 200-pound, $10,000 "Boot" trophy. The trophy itself stands a little over four feet tall, is molded out of 24-karat gold, and is formed from the combined outlines of the states of Arkansas and Louisiana, which resembles the shape of a boot. The Boot was created by former Razorback linebacker David Bazzel. According to Bazzel, it was intentionally made "as big and gaudy as possible, because I wanted to create value in it with gold and size," also making it the heaviest true trophy in college football.

== Game results ==
Arkansas victories	LSU victories	Tie games	Vacated wins

No.	Date	Location	Winning team		Losing team	
1	December 6, 1901	Baton Rouge, LA	LSU	15	Arkansas	0
2	November 29, 1906	Baton Rouge, LA	Tie	6	Tie	6
3	November 6, 1907	Baton Rouge, LA	LSU	17	Arkansas	12
4	November 26, 1908	Little Rock, AR	LSU	36	Arkansas	4
5	November 13, 1909	Memphis, TN	Arkansas	16	LSU	0
6	November 24, 1910	Little Rock, AR	Arkansas	51	LSU	0
7	November 30, 1911	Little Rock, AR	Arkansas	11	LSU	0
8	November 16, 1912	Little Rock, AR	LSU	7	Arkansas	6
9	November 8, 1913	Shreveport, LA	LSU	12	Arkansas	7
10	November 7, 1914	Shreveport, LA	Arkansas	20	LSU	12
11	November 5, 1915	Shreveport, LA	LSU	13	Arkansas	7
12	November 5, 1916	Shreveport, LA	LSU	17	Arkansas	7
13	November 3, 1917	Shreveport, LA	Arkansas	14	LSU	0
14	October 23, 1919	Shreveport, LA	LSU	20	Arkansas	0
15	November 6, 1920	Shreveport, LA	LSU	3	Arkansas	0
16	November 5, 1921	Shreveport, LA	LSU	10	Arkansas	7
17	October 28, 1922	Shreveport, LA	Arkansas	40	LSU	6
18	October 27, 1923	Shreveport, LA	Arkansas	26	LSU	13
19	November 1, 1924	Shreveport, LA	Arkansas	10	LSU	7
20	October 31, 1925	Shreveport, LA	Arkansas	12	LSU	0
21	November 6, 1926	Shreveport, LA	LSU	14	Arkansas	0
22	October 29, 1927	Shreveport, LA	Arkansas	28	LSU	0
23	November 3, 1928	Shreveport, LA	Arkansas	7	LSU	0
24	November 2, 1929	Shreveport, LA	Arkansas	32	LSU	0
25	November 1, 1930	Shreveport, LA	LSU	27	Arkansas	12
26	October 24, 1931	Shreveport, LA	LSU	13	Arkansas	6
27	October 22, 1932	Shreveport, LA	LSU	14	Arkansas	0
28	October 21, 1933	Shreveport, LA	LSU	20	Arkansas	0
29	October 20, 1934	Shreveport, LA	LSU	16	Arkansas	0
30	October 19, 1935	Shreveport, LA	LSU	13	Arkansas	7
31	October 24, 1936	Shreveport, LA	#13 LSU	19	Arkansas	7
32	January 1, 1947	Dallas, TX	Tie	0	Tie	0
33	November 21, 1953	Little Rock, AR	LSU	9	Arkansas	8
34	November 20, 1954	Shreveport, LA	LSU	7	#9 Arkansas	6
35	November 19, 1955	Little Rock, AR	LSU	13	Arkansas	7
36	November 24, 1956	Shreveport, LA	LSU	21	Arkansas	7
37	January 1, 1966	Dallas, TX	LSU	14	#2 Arkansas	7

No.	Date	Location	Winning team		Losing team	
38	November 27, 1992	Fayetteville, AR	Arkansas	30	LSU	6
39	November 27, 1993	Baton Rouge, LA	Arkansas	42	LSU	24
40	November 26, 1994	Little Rock, AR	LSU	30	Arkansas	12
41	November 18, 1995	Baton Rouge, LA	LSU	28	#14 Arkansas	0
42	November 29, 1996	Little Rock, AR	#19 LSU	17	Arkansas	7
43	November 28, 1997	Baton Rouge, LA	#17 LSU	31	Arkansas	21
44	November 27, 1998	Little Rock, AR	#13 Arkansas	41	LSU	14
45	November 26, 1999	Baton Rouge, LA	LSU	35	#17 Arkansas	10
46	November 24, 2000	Little Rock, AR	Arkansas	14	#24 LSU	3
47	November 23, 2001	Baton Rouge, LA	LSU	41	#24 Arkansas	38
48	November 27, 2002	Little Rock, AR	Arkansas	21	#18 LSU	20
49	November 28, 2003	Baton Rouge, LA	#3 LSU	55	Arkansas	24
50	November 26, 2004	Little Rock, AR	#14 LSU	43	Arkansas	14
51	November 25, 2005	Baton Rouge, LA	#3 LSU	19	Arkansas	17
52	November 24, 2006	Little Rock, AR	#9 LSU	31	#5 Arkansas	26
53	November 23, 2007	Baton Rouge, LA	Arkansas	50	#1 LSU	48^{3OT}
54	November 28, 2008	Little Rock, AR	Arkansas	31	LSU	30
55	November 28, 2009	Baton Rouge, LA	#17 LSU	33	Arkansas	30
56	November 27, 2010	Little Rock, AR	#12 Arkansas	31	#6 LSU	23
57	November 25, 2011	Baton Rouge, LA	#1 LSU	41	#3 Arkansas	17
58	November 23, 2012	Fayetteville, AR	#8 LSU^{†}	20	Arkansas	13
59	November 29, 2013	Baton Rouge, LA	#15 LSU^{†}	31	Arkansas	27
60	November 15, 2014	Fayetteville, AR	Arkansas	17	#20 LSU	0
61	November 14, 2015	Baton Rouge, LA	Arkansas	31	#9 LSU	14
62	November 12, 2016	Fayetteville, AR	#19 LSU	38	Arkansas	10
63	November 11, 2017	Baton Rouge, LA	#24 LSU	33	Arkansas	10
64	November 10, 2018	Fayetteville, AR	#7 LSU	24	Arkansas	17
65	November 23, 2019	Baton Rouge, LA	#1 LSU	56	Arkansas	20
66	November 21, 2020	Fayetteville, AR	LSU	27	Arkansas	24
67	November 13, 2021	Baton Rouge, LA	#25 Arkansas	16	LSU	13^{OT}
68	November 12, 2022	Fayetteville, AR	#7 LSU	13	Arkansas	10
69	September 23, 2023	Baton Rouge, LA	#12 LSU	34	Arkansas	31
70	October 19, 2024	Fayetteville, AR	#8 LSU	34	Arkansas	10
71	November 15, 2025	Baton Rouge, LA	LSU	23	Arkansas	22
Series: LSU leads 44–23–2
† 2012 and 2013 wins vacated by NCAA.

== Notable games ==
=== 1947 – the "Ice Bowl" ===
	1	2	3	4	Total
Razorbacks	0	0	0	0	0
Tigers	0	0	0	0	0

LSU 0 – Arkansas 0

The 1947 Cotton Bowl Classic was played at the end of the 1946 college football season. It was the first matchup between the rivals since the 1936 State Fair Classic. The game was named the "Ice Bowl" due to the ice, sleet, snow, and rain, which produced horrid playing conditions. The Tigers only accepted the invitation after being snubbed of a bid to the Sugar Bowl, and entered the game with a record of 9–1.

Despite the scoreless tie, the game was still considered an accomplishment due to the tickets selling out weeks in advance and the attendance of the game, which was around 38,000 despite the weather. LSU had the upper-hand most of the game in terms of offensive production, holding a 15–1 edge over the Razorbacks in first downs and a 271–54 advantage in total yardage, led by quarterback Y. A. Tittle. The Arkansas defense kept the Tiger offense out of the end zone from the Arkansas 1, 6, 7, and 8 yard lines, but Arkansas could not capitalize on any of the stops. The final two plays proved the cold did not stop the teams from having a flair for the dramatic, as Razorback Clyde Scott (a future College Football Hall of Famer) tackled LSU receiver Jeff Odom at the Razorback one, preserving the tie. The Tigers then attempted the go-ahead field goal, but a bad snap ended the game on the final play. This game marked the second (and last) time the two teams tied.

=== 1966 – Cotton Bowl Classic with national championship implications ===
	1	2	3	4	Total
Razorbacks	7	0	0	0	7
Tigers	0	14	0	0	14

LSU 14 – Arkansas 7

The two teams played each other on January 1, 1966, in the Cotton Bowl Classic to end the 1965 season. Arkansas had won the national championship in the previous year (1964), and came into the game with a 10–0 record (and an overall 22-game winning streak on the line) after winning the 1965 SWC title. The Razorbacks were again looking to win the national championship, and had the number one scoring offense coming into the game, averaging 32.4 points per contest.

Arkansas took the ball to the end zone on the opening drive, capped by a 19-yard toss from Jon Brittenum to All-American end Bobby Crockett. Running back Joe LaBruzzo then ran in from three yards out for the Bengal Tigers to tie the game at 7. Razorback QB Brittenum then left the game after suffering a shoulder injury and the Hogs fumbled the ball three plays later. LaBruzzo again scored, this time from one yard away, giving the Tigers a 14–7 halftime lead.

Neither team scored in the second half, and Arkansas ended the game on the LSU 24 yard line. Razorback Bobby Crockett set a bowl record with 10 catches for 129 yards, but it was not enough as the Tigers edged Arkansas for the win, 14–7. The Tigers improved their final record to 8–3, while the Razorbacks dropped to 10–1 for the season.

Scoring summary

Quarter	Time	Drive			Team	Scoring information	Score	
Quarter	Time	Plays	Yards	TOP	Team	Scoring information	ARK	LSU
1			87		ARK	Bobby Crockett 19-yard touchdown reception from Harry Wilson, Ronny South kick good	7	0
2			80		LSU	Joe LaBruzzo 3-yard touchdown run, Doug Moreau kick good	7	7
2			34		LSU	Joe LaBruzzo 1-yard touchdown run, Doug Moreau kick good	7	14
"TOP" = time of possession. For other American football terms, see Glossary of American football.							7	14

=== 1996 – first "Boot" trophy awarded ===
LSU 17 – Arkansas 7

In 1996, the 19th-ranked LSU Tigers won the first "Boot" trophy, 17–7. For the Tigers, running back Kevin Faulk rushed for 138 yards and a touchdown and quarterback Herb Tyler threw for 191 yards. LSU coach Gerry DiNardo was quoted after the game as saying, "Obviously it was a great win. I feel we had a terrific first half. In the second half the defense didn't play as well as it should and the offense didn't score."

=== 2002 ===
	1	2	3	4	Total
#18 Tigers	7	3	7	3	20
Razorbacks	0	0	7	14	21

Arkansas 21 – LSU 20

Trailing 20–14 with 34 seconds left, the Razorbacks (8–3, 4–3 SEC) got the ball at their own 19. Arkansas quarterback Matt Jones completed a 50-yard pass to Richard Smith on the first play. After one pass incompletion, Jones threw a 31-yard touchdown pass to DeCori Birmingham, who leaped over LSU defensive back Randall Gay, with nine seconds left on the game clock. Arkansas was penalized 15 yards for excessive celebration, moving the go-ahead extra point to the 18 yard line. Arkansas kicker David Carlton barely made the 35-yard extra point (which was long enough, but curved left) to give Arkansas the 21–20 win and the opportunity to go to the 2002 SEC Championship Game as the SEC Western Division's top seeded co-champion. LSU had already clinched a share of the SEC Western Division title going into the game but would have advanced to the conference championship game if it had won. The finish is considered by Arkansas fans as one of the all-time greatest finishes in Razorback history. The Razorbacks, however, were embarrassed in the SEC Championship Game by Georgia, 30–3. The Razorbacks accepted an invitation to the Music City Bowl, where they lost to Minnesota 29–14. The Tigers were invited to the Cotton Bowl, where they lost to Texas 35–20.

Scoring summary

Quarter	Time	Drive			Team	Scoring information	Score	
Quarter	Time	Plays	Yards	TOP	Team	Scoring information	LSU	ARK
1	9:58		86	3:38	LSU	Skyler Green 67-yard touchdown reception from Marcus Randall, John Corbello kick good	7	0
2	3:18		57	3:18	LSU	48-yard field goal by John Corbello	10	0
3	13:03		61	4:13	ARK	Mark Pierce 1-yard touchdown run, David Carlton kick good	10	7
3	8:26		89	2:06	LSU	Marcus Randall 5-yard touchdown run, John Corbello kick good	17	7
4	7:57		80	:24	ARK	Fred Talley 56-yard touchdown run, David Carlton kick good	17	14
4	6:23		53	5:40	LSU	29-yard field goal by John Corbello	20	14
4	:34		80	:25	ARK	Decori Birmingham 31-yard touchdown reception from Matt Jones, David Carlton kick good	20	21
"TOP" = time of possession. For other American football terms, see Glossary of American football.							20	21

=== 2003–2006 ===
The LSU Tigers won The Boot Trophy four consecutive times between the 2003 and 2006 contests, while also staying at or near the top of the SEC Western Division standings. LSU won the 2003 SEC Championship Game (while going on to win the national championship after winning the 2004 Sugar Bowl), and also went to the 2005 SEC Championship Game. Arkansas went to the 2006 SEC Championship Game despite losing to LSU in The Boot game.

=== 2007 – Triple Overtime Thriller ===
	1	2	3	4	OT	2OT	3OT	Total
Razorbacks	0	7	14	7	7	7	8	50
#1 Tigers	6	0	15	7	7	7	6	48

Arkansas 50 – LSU 48 (3OT)

Coming into the November 23, 2007, game, which was played in Baton Rouge, LSU was ranked #1 in the country in the BCS, and most major polls. The Razorbacks outlasted the Tigers in a grueling three-overtime game for the win. Star running back (and 2007 Heisman Trophy runner-up) Darren McFadden rushed for 206 yards and three touchdowns, and threw for one touchdown to lift Arkansas to a 50–48 victory in front of 92,606 people (the official attendance) at Tiger Stadium. The "Wild Hog" formation (Arkansas' name for the Wildcat formation) was run prominently in the game, led by McFadden, in which he was a triple threat to run, hand off, or throw.

Scoring summary

Quarter	Time	Drive			Team	Scoring information	Score	
Quarter	Time	Plays	Yards	TOP	Team	Scoring information	ARK	LSU
1	13:19		11	1:35	LSU	32-yard field goal by Colt David	0	3
1	07:16		41	4:31	LSU	49-yard field goal by Colt David	0	6
2	07:33		97	3:23	ARK	Darren McFadden 16-yard touchdown run, Alex Tejada kick good	7	6
3	09:49		80	1:46	ARK	Darren McFadden 73-yard touchdown run, Alex Tejada kick good	14	6
3	07:48		51	1:52	LSU	Jacob Hester 12-yard touchdown run, 2-point run good	14	14
3	05:46		83	1:54	ARK	Peyton Hillis 65-yard touchdown run, Alex Tejada kick good	21	14
3	02:22		75	3:18	LSU	Demetrius Byrd 7-yard touchdown reception from Matt Flynn, Colt David kick good	21	21
4	05:06		72	2:24	ARK	Peyton Hillis 24-yard touchdown reception from Darren McFadden, Alex Tejada kick good	28	21
4	00:57		79	4:02	LSU	Demetrius Byrd 2-yard touchdown reception from Matt Flynn, Colt David kick good	28	28
OT1	15:00		25	0:00	LSU	Matt Flynn 12-yard touchdown run, Colt David kick good	28	35
OT1	15:00		25	0:00	ARK	Peyton Hillis 10-yard touchdown reception from Casey Dick, Alex Tejada kick good	35	35
OT2	15:00		25	0:00	ARK	Darren McFadden 9-yard touchdown run, Alex Tejada kick good	42	35
OT2	15:00		25	0:00	LSU	Jacob Hester 2-yard touchdown run, Colt David kick good	42	42
OT3	15:00		25	0:00	ARK	Peyton Hillis 3-yard touchdown run, 2-point run good	50	42
OT3	15:00		25	0:00	LSU	Brandon LaFell 9-yard touchdown reception from Matt Flynn, 2-point pass no good	50	48
"TOP" = time of possession. For other American football terms, see Glossary of American football.							50	48

=== 2008 – Miracle on Markham II ===
	1	2	3	4	Total
Tigers	3	20	7	0	30
Razorbacks	14	0	7	10	31

Arkansas 31 – LSU 30

In 2008, Arkansas quarterback Casey Dick threw a 24-yard touchdown pass to wide receiver London Crawford on a fourth-down (with one yard to go) situation with only 22 seconds remaining on the game clock to give the Razorbacks a 31–30 victory over the Tigers at War Memorial Stadium in Little Rock. Coincidentally, Crawford caught it in the same corner in the same endzone DeCori Birmingham had scored the game winner six years earlier. The Razorbacks had trailed, 30–14, early in the third quarter when Casey replaced his younger brother, Nathan, at quarterback. LSU incurred several penalties that aided Arkansas in the winning drive, which included converting twice on fourth down.

Coming into the game, both teams were unranked and out of contention for the SEC West title. LSU finished the 2008 season ranked third in the West (behind Alabama and Ole Miss) and was bowl-bound. Arkansas finished 4th in the division and was out of contention for a bowl game.

Because of the similarities between this outcome and the 2002 game, some, such as Fayetteville-based The Morning News, called this game the "Miracle on Markham II". Other columnists and news sources, citing less of the impact or flair of the Miracle on Markham, have suggested other titles, such as "Madness on Markham". Quarterback for the Razorbacks at the time, Casey Dick, reluctantly stated, “That’s fine with me,” when asked about the "Miracle on Markham II" title for the game.

=== 2010 – matchup with Sugar Bowl implications ===
	1	2	3	4	Total
#5 Tigers	0	14	6	3	23
#12 Razorbacks	7	14	0	10	31

In a top-fifteen matchup in War Memorial Stadium, Arkansas regained The Boot trophy with a 31–23 season-defining victory. The Razorbacks’ offense recorded 464 total yards of offense against the Tigers, who had the top-ranked defense in the SEC entering the contest. Arkansas's sophomore running back Knile Davis rushed for 152 yards, including nine straight rushes on the final Arkansas drive, and Ryan Mallett broke the school record of 60 career touchdown passes in the contest. Cobi Hamilton of Arkansas had three catches for 164 yards and two touchdowns of 80 or more yards, including a long score with six seconds remaining before halftime. Stevan Ridley had two rushing scores for LSU. Arkansas ended their season with 10–3 record and LSU ended their season with an 11–2 record. Immediately following the end of the game, Def Leopard's "Pour Some Sugar On Me" was played over the stadium sound system, and many fans produced bags of powdered sugar, opening them, throwing powdered sugar into the air to celebrate the Razorbacks understood participation in the Sugar Bowl.

=== 2013 ===
With starting quarterback Zach Mettenberger sidelined by a knee injury in the fourth quarter, an unlikely, last-minute 99.5-yard winning touchdown drive was achieved by a true freshman back-up QB (Anthony Jennings) to hand #15 LSU the victory, 31–27. The win was sealed with a 49-yard TD pass to another freshman, Travin Dural, with just 1:15 remaining.

== See also ==
- List of NCAA college football rivalry games
