= Carroll Vogelaar =

American football player (1920–1967)

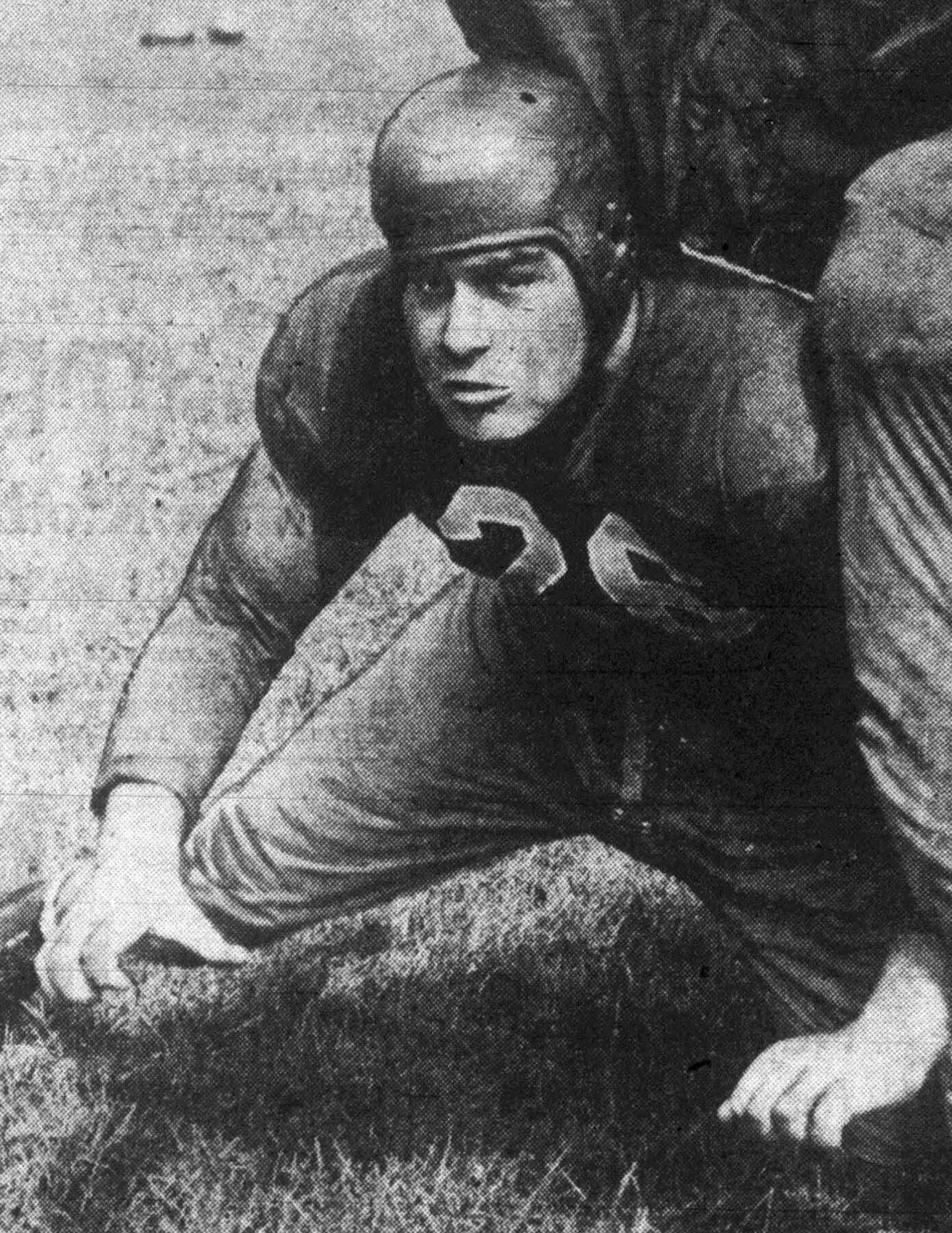
- Vogelaar, circa 1941

No. 51, 83
- Positions: Tackle, defensive tackle

Personal information
- Born: April 8, 1920; Idyllwild–Pine Cove, California, U.S.
- Died: December 7, 1967 (aged 47); Palm Springs, California, U.S.
- Listed height: 6 ft 3 in (1.91 m)
- Listed weight: 253 lb (115 kg)

Career information
- High school: Hemet (East Hemet, California)
- College: Loyola Marymount; San Francisco
- NFL draft: 1947: 5th round, 27th overall pick

Career history
- Boston/New York Yanks (1947–1950)

Career NFL statistics
- Games played: 46
- Games started: 34
- Fumble recoveries: 4
- Stats at Pro Football Reference

Carroll Vogelaar (April 8, 1920 – December 7, 1967) was an American professional football tackle and defensive tackle. He played for the Boston/New York Yanks from 1947 to 1950. Vogelaar was a pilot in the United States Marine Corps during World War II, where he was credited with shooting down a Japanese Mitsubishi Ki-46 on July 23rd, 1945 while a member of Marine Fighter Squadron 351. In 1951 following his retirement from football, Vogelaar purchased and owned the Fern Valley Lodge near Idyllwild, California but sold it to the Kwikset Employees Trust in 1953.
