= Nick Nicholson (singer) =

American country singer

- Born: Christopher Alvin Nicholson
- Origin: Gray, Tennessee
- Genres: Country
- Occupations: Singer-Songwriter
- Instruments: Vocals, Acoustic Guitar, Percussion
- Years active: 1998 - Present
- Website: http://www.nicknicholsonmusic.com/

Nick Nicholson is an American country singer. He is originally from Greenville, Tennessee and currently resides in Phoenix, Arizona. His first album, "Self Titled" Nick Nicholson (2008) includes fan favorite songs 'Somethin' Somethin', 'This Old Ring', 'Real Women Drive Pickup Trucks', and 'Tell Me How You Like It'. "The Tennessee transplant plays straight up, rockin' country, a combination of twang and bang influenced by the likes of Conway Twitty and Lynyrd Skynyrd".

== Discography ==
=== Albums ===
- 2008 - Nick Nicholson

=== Awards ===
- 2007 National Independent Male Country Artist of Year - L.A. Music( F.A.M.E.)
- 2008 Independent Male Country Artist of the Year - Phoenix Music Awards (Nominated)
