= Willie Zapalac =

American football coach (1920–2010)

Biographical details
- Born: December 11, 1920; Sealy, Texas, U.S.
- Died: May 18, 2010 (aged 89); Austin, Texas, U.S.

Playing career

Football
- 1941–1942: Texas A&M
- 1946: Texas A&M
- Position: Fullback

Coaching career (HC unless noted)

Football
- 1947: McAllen HS (TX) (assistant)
- 1948: John Tarleton (assistant)
- 1949–1950: Tarleton State
- 1951: Hillsboro HS (TX)
- 1952: Arlington State
- 1953–1960: Texas A&M (assistant)
- 1961–1962: Texas Tech (OL)
- 1963: Oklahoma State (OL)
- 1964–1975: Texas (OL)
- 1976–1977: St. Louis Cardinals (DL)
- 1978–1980: Buffalo Bills (DL)
- 1981–1985: New Orleans Saints (DL)

Basketball
- 1950–1951: Tarleton State

Head coaching record
- Overall: 19–10–1 (junior college football)

Accomplishments and honors

Championships
- Football; 1 Pioneer Conference (1952)

Awards
- Second-team All-SWC (1946)

Willie Frank Zapalac (December 11, 1920 – May 18, 2010) was an American football player and coach. He served as the head football Tarleton State College—now known as Tarleton State University—from 1949 to 1950 and Arlington State College—now known as the University of Texas at Arlington—in 1952, when both schools were junior colleges. Zapalac played college football as a Fullback at the Agricultural and Mechanical College of Texas—now known as Texas A&M University. He was an assistant coach at Texas A&M from 1953 to 1960, Texas Technological College—now known as Texas Tech University— from 1961 to 1962, Oklahoma State University–Stillwater in 1963, and University of Texas at Austin from 1964 to 1975. He then coached in the National Football League (NFL) with the St. Louis Cardinals from 1976 to 1977, the Buffalo Bills from 1978 to 1980, and the New Orleans Saints from 1981 to 1985.

While at the University of Texas, Zapalac coached under Darrell Royal for 12 seasons. During that time, the Texas Longhorns won seven Southwest Conference (SWC) championships and two national championships. Zapalac was known for producing many offensive lines for Texas's wishbone offense. For a period of five years, at least one offensive lineman was named to All-American teams and two of those five have been inducted into the College Football Hall of Fame.

== Early life and playing career ==
Zapalac was born on December 11, 1920, in Sealy, Texas, to V. R. Zapalac and Mary Louise Sodolak. He starred in football at Bellville High School in Bellville, Texas. Zapalac lettered in football Texas A&M in 1941 and 1942 before joining the United States Army Air Forces as a bombardier during World War II. He served in the Philippines and Japan, reaching the rank of first lieutenant. Zapalac returned to Texas A&M, letter again in 1946 when he was named to the All-Southwest Conference second team by the United Press (UP). After graduating from Texas A&M in 1947, Zapalac was signed to play for the Pittsburgh Steelers of the NFL, but a recurrent knee injury ended his playing career.

== Coaching career ==
Zapalac began his coaching career in 1947, when he was hired as an assistant football coach at McAllen High School, in McAllen, Texas, under head coach Chuck Moser.

== Family ==
Zapalac had two sons, Bill and Jeff, who played football at the University of Texas. Bill played professionally three seasons in the NFL for the New York Jets.

== Head coaching record ==
=== Junior college football ===
Year	Team	Overall	Conference	Standing	Bowl/playoffs
Tarleton State Plowboys (Southwestern Junior College Conference) (1949)
1949	Tarleton State	4–6	2–5	6th	
Tarleton State Plowboys (Pioneer Conference) (1950)
1950	Tarleton State	7–3	2–1	2nd	
Tarleton State:		11–9	7–7		
Arlington State Rebels (Pioneer Conference) (1952)
1952	Arlington State	8–1–1	3–0–1	1st	
Arlington State:		8–1–1	3–0–1		
Total:		19–10–1			
National championship Conference title Conference division title or championship game berth
