= Charles Craig Cannon =

United States Army officer

- Born: October 24, 1914
- Died: September 20, 1992 (aged 77)
- Military career
- Allegiance: United States
- Branch: United States Army
- Rank: Colonel
- Units: 332nd Engineers; European Theater of Operations United States Army
- Conflicts: World War II

Charles Craig Cannon (October 24, 1914 – September 20, 1992) was a United States Army officer who served as Aide-de-camp to General Dwight D. Eisenhower following the conclusion of World War II.

== Biography ==
Charles Craig Cannon received his B.E.E. from the University of Delaware in 1936. He was commissioned as a captain in June 1942 and went overseas in August of that year as a regimental officer with the 332nd Engineers. He was appointed Aide-de-camp to General Dwight D. Eisenhower on December 19, 1945. He had previously been serving as a staff officer in ETOUSA (European Theater of Operations United States Army) and USFET (United States Forces, European Theater of Operations) since January 1944.

Following Eisenhower's promotion to chief of staff in 1945, Craig (now a major) became responsible for running Eisenhower's office and supervising his secretaries. Eventually promoted to Colonel, Cannon continued in his capacity as personal aide to Eisenhower when Eisenhower was appointed the Supreme Commander of the North Atlantic Treaty Organization (NATO) in 1952.
