= Nick Nicholson (American football) =

American football player and coach (1925–2010)

Biographical details
- Born: December 3, 1925; Farmersville, Texas, U.S.
- Died: September 29, 2010 (aged 84); San Antonio, Texas, U.S.

Playing career
- 1945–1947: Rice
- Position: Guard

Coaching career (HC unless noted)
- 1948–1951: Freeport HS (TX) (assistant)
- 1952–1955: Freeport HS (TX)
- 1956–1961: Abilene Christian

Head coaching record
- Overall: 28–30–1 (college)

Accomplishments and honors

Awards
- First-team All-SWC (1945)

Novice Lee "Nick" Nicholson (December 3, 1925 – September 29, 2010) was an American football player and coach. He was the eighth head football coach at Abilene Christian University in Abilene, Texas, serving for six seasons, from 1956 to 1961, and compiling a record of 28–30–1.

Nicholson was born in Farmersville, Texas and grew up in Greenville. He was co-captain of his high school's football team in 1943 before graduating in 1944 and serving in the United States Navy. He played college football at Rice University, where he was selected to the 1945 All-Southwest Conference football team as a guard. Nicholson earned a master's degree in education from North Texas State College—now known as the University of North Texas—in 1952.

== Head coaching record ==
=== College ===
Year	Team	Overall	Conference	Standing	Bowl/playoffs
Abilene Christian Wildcats (Gulf Coast Conference) (1956)
1956	Abilene Christian	4–6	1–2	3rd	
Abilene Christian Wildcats (Independent) (1957–1961)
1957	Abilene Christian	5–3–1			
1958	Abilene Christian	5–5			
1959	Abilene Christian	5–5			
1960	Abilene Christian	5–5			
1961	Abilene Christian	4–6			
Abilene Christian:		28–30–1	1–2		
Total:		28–30–1			
