= 1946 Texas Longhorns football team =

American college football season

1946 Texas Longhorns football
- Conference: Southwest Conference

Ranking
- AP: No. 15
- Record: 8–2 (4–2 SWC)
- Head coach: Dana X. Bible (10th season)
- Home stadium: War Memorial Stadium

1946 Southwest Conference football standings
	Conf.					Overall
Team	W		L		T	W		L		T
No. 10 Rice +	5	–	1	–	0	9	–	2	–	0
No. 16 Arkansas +	5	–	1	–	0	6	–	3	–	2
No. 15 Texas	4	–	2	–	0	8	–	2	–	0
Texas A&M	4	–	2	–	0	4	–	6	–	0
SMU	2	–	4	–	0	4	–	5	–	1
TCU	2	–	4	–	0	2	–	7	–	1
Baylor	0	–	6	–	0	1	–	8	–	0
+ – Conference co-champions; Rankings from AP Poll

The 1946 Texas Longhorns football team was an American football team that represented the University of Texas in the Southwest Conference (SWC) during the 1946 college football season. In their tenth and final year under head coach Dana X. Bible, the Longhorns compiled an 8–2 record (4–2 against SWC opponenets) and outscored all opponents by a total of 290 to 68. Texas was ranked No. 1 in the first AP Poll of the 1946 season, but slid throughout the season and was ranked No. 15 in the final poll.

The Longhorns ranked 15th nationally in total offense with an average of 328.1 yards per game, and 10th nationally in total defense with 176.0 yards allowed per game. Led by Bobby Layne, they ranked third nationally in passing offense with 156.9 yards per game. Layne ranked second nationally in total offense with 1,460 yards (1,122 passing and 336 rushing) and second nationally in passing yardage.

Five Texas players received honors from the Associated Press (AP) or United Press (UP) on the 1946 All-Southwest Conference football team: Bobby Layne (AP-1, UP-1); center Dick Harris (AP-1, UP-1); back Jim Canady (AP-2, UP-2); end Hub Bechtol (AP-2, UP-2); and guard Spot Collins (AP-2, UP-2).

== Pre-Seasone ==
Texas was picked to win the Southwest Conference by 65 of 70 sports writer and radio commentaries.

== Schedule ==
Date	Opponent	Rank	Site	Result	Attendance	Source
September 21	Missouri*		Memorial Stadium; Austin, TX	W 42–0	37,000	
September 28	Colorado*		Memorial Stadium; Austin, TX	W 76–0	25,000	
October 5	Oklahoma A&M*		Memorial Stadium; Austin, TX	W 54–6	45,000	
October 12	vs. Oklahoma*	No. 1	Cotton Bowl; Dallas, TX (Red River Rivalry)	W 20–13	> 50,000	
October 19	No. 14 Arkansas	No. 3	Memorial Stadium; Austin, TX (rivalry)	W 20–0	40,000	
October 26	at No. 16 Rice	No. 3	Rice Field; Houston, TX (rivalry)	L 13–18	30,000	
November 2	SMU	No. 7	Memorial Stadium; Austin, TX	W 19–3	34,000	
November 9	at Baylor	No. 6	Waco Stadium; Waco, TX (rivalry)	W 22–7	15,000	
November 16	at TCU	No. 6	Amon G. Carter Stadium; Fort Worth, TX (rivalry)	L 0–14	21,000	
November 28	Texas A&M	No. 20	Memorial Stadium; Austin, TX (rivalry)	W 24–7	48,000	
*Non-conference game; Rankings from AP Poll released prior to the game

== Rankings ==
Ranking movements Legend: ██ Increase in ranking ██ Decrease in ranking ( ) = First-place votes
	Week								
Poll	1	2	3	4	5	6	7	8	Final
AP	1 (69⅓)	3 (38)	3 (13¼)	7	6	6	17	20	15 (1)

== Awards and honors ==
- Hub Bechtol, End, Consensus All-American

== After the season ==
The 1947 NFL draft was held on December 16, 1946. The following Longhorns were selected.

Round	Pick	Player	Position	NFL club
1	5	Hub Bechtol	End	Pittsburgh Steelers
2	13	Walt Heap	Back	Boston Yanks
6	45	Harlan Wetz	Tackle	Chicago Bears
8	59	Hank Harris	Guard	Washington Redskins
19	174	Frank Guess	Back	New York Giants
20	184	Tom Landry	Defensive back	New York Giants
20	185	Bill Cromer	Back	Washington Redskins
23	215	Al Lawler	Halfback	Chicago Bears
24	217	Ed Heap	Tackle	Boston Yanks
28	265	Joe Bill Baumgardner	Halfback	Chicago Bears
