= 1946 TCU Horned Frogs football team =

American college football season

1946 TCU Horned Frogs football
- Conference: Southwest Conference
- Record: 2–7–1 (2–4 SWC)
- Head coach: Dutch Meyer (13th season)
- Offensive scheme: Meyer spread
- Home stadium: Amon G. Carter Stadium

1946 Southwest Conference football standings
| | Conf. | | | | | Overall |
| Team | W | | L | | T | W | | L | | T |
|---|---|---|---|---|---|---|---|---|---|---|
| No. 10 Rice + | 5 | – | 1 | – | 0 | 9 | – | 2 | – | 0 |
| No. 16 Arkansas + | 5 | – | 1 | – | 0 | 6 | – | 3 | – | 2 |
| No. 15 Texas | 4 | – | 2 | – | 0 | 8 | – | 2 | – | 0 |
| Texas A&M | 4 | – | 2 | – | 0 | 4 | – | 6 | – | 0 |
| SMU | 2 | – | 4 | – | 0 | 4 | – | 5 | – | 1 |
| TCU | 2 | – | 4 | – | 0 | 2 | – | 7 | – | 1 |
| Baylor | 0 | – | 6 | – | 0 | 1 | – | 8 | – | 0 |
+ – Conference co-champions; Rankings from AP Poll

The 1946 TCU Horned Frogs football team was an American football team that represented Texas Christian University (TCU) in the Southwest Conference (SWC) during the 1946 college football season. In their 13th year under head coach Dutch Meyer, the Horned Frogs compiled a 2–7–1 record (2–4 against SWC opponents) and were outscored by a total of 148 to 90.

Tackle Weldon Edwards was selected by both the Associated Press and United Press as a first-team player on the 1946 All-Southwest Conference football team.

TCU was ranked at No. 52 in the final Litkenhous Difference by Score System rankings for 1946.

The Frogs played their home games in Amon G. Carter Stadium, which is located on campus in Fort Worth, Texas.

== Schedule ==
| Date | Opponent | Site | Result | Attendance | Source |
|---|---|---|---|---|---|
| September 21 | vs. Kansas* | Blues Stadium; Kansas City, MO | T 0–0 | 20,405 | |
| September 28 | Baylor | Amon G. Carter Stadium; Fort Worth, TX (rivalry) | W 19–16 | 16,000 | |
| October 5 | Arkansas | Amon G. Carter Stadium; Fort Worth, TX | L 14–34 | 13,000 | |
| October 11 | at Miami (FL)* | Burdine Stadium; Miami, FL | L 12–20 | 30,860 | |
| October 19 | at Texas A&M | Kyle Field; College Station, TX (rivalry) | L 0–14 | 20,000 | |
| October 25 | vs. Oklahoma A&M* | Taft Stadium; Oklahoma City, OK | L 6–7 | 16,000 | |
| November 2 | No. 14 Oklahoma* | Amon G. Carter Stadium; Fort Worth, TX | L 12–14 | 6,000 | |
| November 16 | No. 6 Texas | Amon G. Carter Stadium; Fort Worth, TX (rivalry) | W 14–0 | 21,000 | |
| November 23 | at No. 12 Rice | Rice Field; Houston, TX | L 0–13 | 28,000 | |
| November 30 | at SMU | Cotton Bowl; Dallas, TX (rivalry) | L 13–30 | 17,000 | |
*Non-conference game; Rankings from AP Poll released prior to the game

== After the season ==
The 1947 NFL draft was held on December 16, 1946. The following Horned Frogs were selected.

| Round | Pick | Player | Position | NFL club |
|---|---|---|---|---|
| 14 | 119 | Weldon Edwards | Tackle | Washington Redskins |
| 22 | 198 | Fred Taylor | End | Pittsburgh Steelers |
| 25 | 227 | John Polzin | Guard | Boston Yanks |
| 26 | 237 | Dave Bloxom | Back | Boston Yanks |
