= 1946 All-Southwest Conference football team =

American college football all-star team

The 1946 All-Southwest Conference football team consists of American football players chosen by the Associated Press (AP) and the United Press (UP) as the best players at each position among teams playing in the Southwest Conference during the 1946 college football season.

In the UP voting, Texas quarterback Bobby Layne received the highest total with 38 points. Rice guard Weldon Humble ranked second with 37 points. Humble and Texas end Hub Bechtol were also consensus picks for the 1943 All-America college football team.

== All Southwest selections ==
=== Backs ===
- Bobby Layne, Texas (AP-1, UP-1)
- Clyde Scott, Arkansas (AP-1, UP-1)
- Carl Russ, Rice (AP-1, UP-1)
- Huey Keeney, Rice (AP-1, UP-1)
- Jim Canady, Texas (AP-2, UP-2)
- Virgil Eikenberg (AP-2, UP-2)
- Ken Holland, Arkansas (AP-2, UP-2)
- Aubrey Fowler, Arkansas (AP-2)
- Willie Zapalac, Texas A&M (UP-2)

=== Ends ===
- Gene Wilson, SMU (AP-1, UP-1)
- Alton Baldwin, Arkansas (AP-1, UP-1)
- Hub Bechtol, Texas (AP-2, UP-2)
- Win Williams, Rice (AP-2, UP-2)

=== Tackles ===
- Weldon Edwards, TCU (AP-1, UP-1)
- Charles Lively, Arkansas (AP-1, UP-2)
- Charles Malmberg, Rice (AP-2, UP-1)
- Monte Moncrief, Texas A&M (AP-2, UP-2)

=== Guards ===
- Weldon Humble, Rice (AP-1, UP-1)
- Jim Sid Wright, SMU (AP-1, UP-1)
- Spot Collins, Texas (AP-2, UP-2)
- Odell Stautzenberger, Texas A&M (AP-2, UP-2)

=== Centers ===
- Dick Harris, Texas (AP-1, UP-1)
- Bill Thomas, Arkansas (AP-2, UP-2)

== Key ==
AP = Associated Press

UP = United Press

Bold = Consensus first-team selection of both the AP and UP

== See also ==
- 1946 College Football All-America Team
