= 1945 South Dakota Coyotes football team =

American college football season

1945 South Dakota Coyotes football
- Conference: Independent
- Record: 0–4
- Head coach: Grant Heckenlively (1st season)
- Home stadium: Inman Field

1945 Midwestern college football independents records
	Conf.			Overall
Team	W	L	T	W		L		T
Michigan State Normal		–		5	–	0	–	1
Central Michigan		–		6	–	1	–	0
Miami (OH)		–		7	–	2	–	0
No. 9 Notre Dame		–		7	–	2	–	1
Detroit		–		6	–	3	–	0
Great Lakes Navy		–		6	–	4	–	1
Michigan State		–		5	–	3	–	1
Marquette		–		5	–	4	–	1
Bowling Green		–		4	–	3	–	0
Western Michigan		–		4	–	3	–	0
Cincinnati		–		4	–	4	–	0
Ohio		–		3	–	4	–	0
Ohio Wesleyan		–		3	–	4	–	0
Carthage		–		2	–	3	–	0
Wayne		–		2	–	5	–	1
Rankings from AP Poll

The 1945 South Dakota Coyotes football team was an American football team that represented the University of South Dakota as an independent during the 1945 college football season. The team compiled a 0–4 record and was outscored by a total of 92 to 0.

The 1945 season marked South Dakota's return to intercollegiate football after two seasons of hiatus during World War II. The program had been suspended after the 1942 season due to a dearth of talent. Athletic director Carl B. "Rube" Hoy noted that the talent shortage continued in 1945: "The success of football this year will largely depend on the number of 16 and 17-year-old boys coming to school this fall, plus the discharged veterans."

The annual rivalry game with South Dakota State was not played, because South Dakota announced its return to football after South Dakota State had already set its 1945 schedule.

Grant Heckenlively was hired as the program's new head coach. He had played center for the team from 1937 to 1940, served in the military during the war, and had been recently discharged.

In mid-September, 30 students showed up for the team's pre-season practice.

The team played its home games at Inman Field in Vermillion, South Dakota.

== Schedule ==
Date	Opponent	Site	Result	Source
October 13	Wayne State (NE)	Vermillion, SD	L 0–6	
October 20	Yankton	Yankton, SD	L 0–13	
October 27	Dakota Wesleyan	Vermillion, SD (Dakota Day)	L 0–20	
November 17	at Nebraska	Memorial Stadium; Lincoln, NE	L 0–53	

== Roster ==
The team's roster included:

- Dick Cave, tackle, 175 pounds, Watertown, South Dakota
- Ray Coburn Jr., tackle, 205 pounds, Sioux City, Iowa
- Lloyd Kennedy, guard, 170 pounds, Remsen, Iowa
- Harold Klostergaard, end, 190 pounds, Beresford, South Dakota
- Bob Mateer, guard, 185 pounds, Parker, South Dakota
- Russell Molstad, halfback, 165 pounds, Watertown, South Dakota
- Franklin Mumford, fullback, 190 pounds, Howard, South Dakota
- Bob Owens, center, 195 pounds, Vermillion, South Dakota
- Gene Owens, quarterback, 170 pounds, Vermillion, South Dakota
- Tom Richards, halfback, 165 pounds, Sioux Falls, South Dakota
- Jerome Smith, end, 180 pounds, Primghar, Iowa
