= 1945 Pittsburgh Panthers football team =

American college football season

1945 Pittsburgh Panthers football
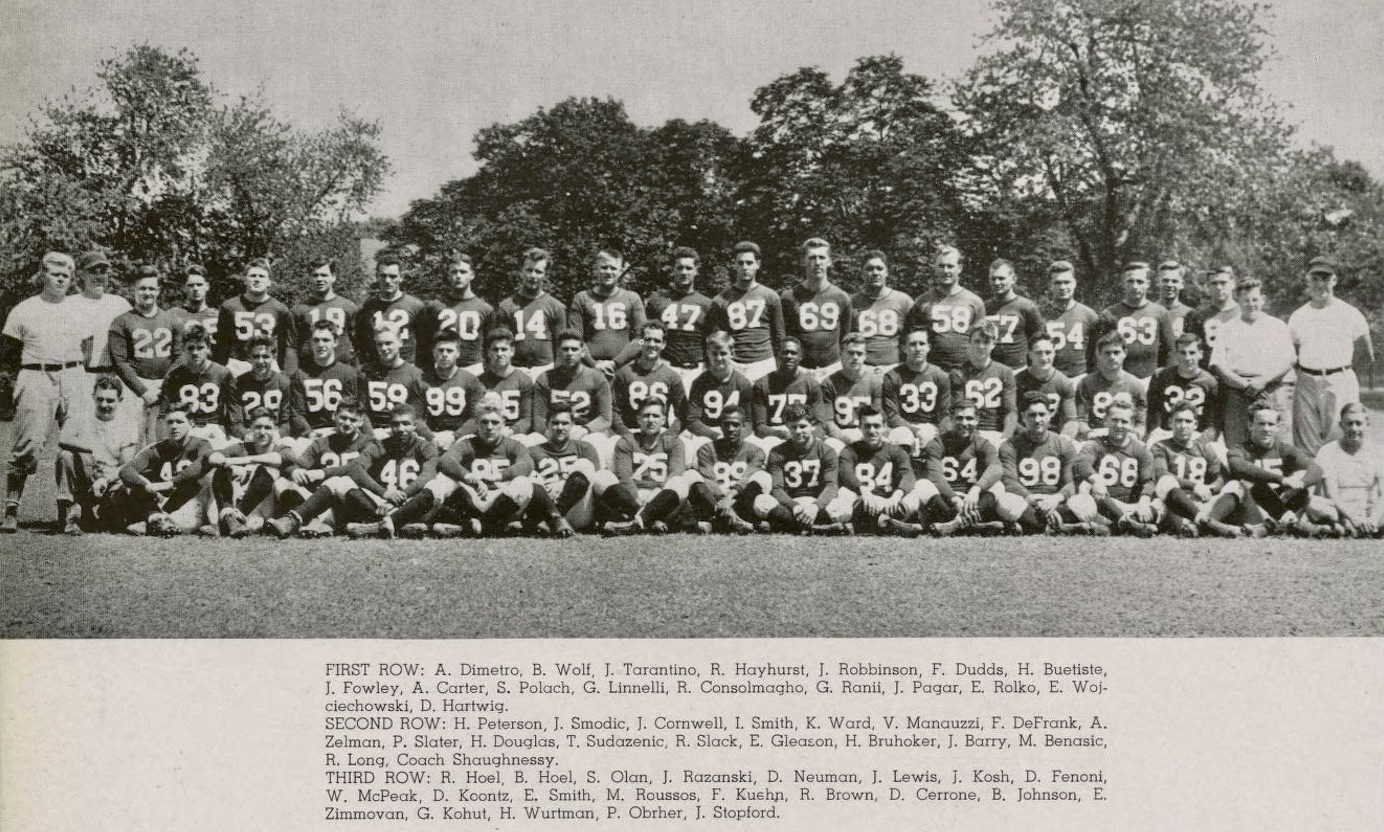
- Conference: Independent
- Record: 3–7
- Head coach: Clark Shaughnessy (3rd season)
- Home stadium: Pitt Stadium

1945 Eastern college football independents records
	Conf.			Overall
Team	W	L	T	W		L		T
No. 1 Army		–		9	–	0	–	0
Franklin & Marshall		–		4	–	0	–	1
No. 20 Columbia		–		8	–	1	–	0
Temple		–		7	–	1	–	0
No. 16 Holy Cross		–		8	–	2	–	0
Tufts		–		4	–	1	–	0
No. 8 Penn		–		6	–	2	–	0
Yale		–		6	–	3	–	0
Massachusetts State		–		2	–	1	–	1
Harvard		–		5	–	3	–	0
Penn State		–		5	–	3	–	0
Cornell		–		5	–	4	–	0
Villanova		–		4	–	4	–	0
Boston College		–		3	–	4	–	0
Brown		–		3	–	4	–	1
Colgate		–		3	–	4	–	1
Princeton		–		2	–	3	–	2
NYU		–		3	–	4	–	0
Pittsburgh		–		3	–	7	–	0
Bucknell		–		2	–	5	–	0
Drexel		–		2	–	5	–	0
Dartmouth		–		1	–	6	–	1
Syracuse		–		1	–	6	–	0
Boston University		–		0	–	5	–	0
CCNY		–		0	–	8	–	0
Rankings from AP Poll

The 1945 Pittsburgh Panthers football team represented the University of Pittsburgh as an independent during the 1945 college football season. The team compiled a 3–7 record under head coach Clark Shaughnessy.

== Schedule ==
Date	Opponent	Site	Result	Attendance	Source
September 22	at Illinois	Memorial Stadium; Champaign, IL	L 6–23	9,962	
September 29	West Virginia	Pitt Stadium; Pittsburgh, PA (rivalry)	W 20–0	7,500–10,000	
October 6	Bucknell	Pitt Stadium; Pittsburgh, PA	W 38–0	10,000	
October 13	Michigan State	Pitt Stadium; Pittsburgh, PA	L 7–12	12,000–15,000	
October 20	No. 3 Notre Dame	Pitt Stadium; Pittsburgh, PA (rivalry)	L 9–39	57,542	
October 27	Temple	Pitt Stadium; Pittsburgh, PA	L 0–6	12,000	
November 3	at No. 13 Purdue	Ross–Ade Stadium; West Lafayette, IN	L 0–28	15,000	
November 10	No. 8 Ohio State	Pitt Stadium; Pittsburgh, PA	L 0–14	18,000–20,000	
November 17	No. 4 Indiana	Pitt Stadium; Pittsburgh, PA	L 0–19	5,000	
November 24	Penn State	Pitt Stadium; Pittsburgh, PA (rivalry)	W 7–0	11,354	
Rankings from AP Poll released prior to the game

== Preseason ==
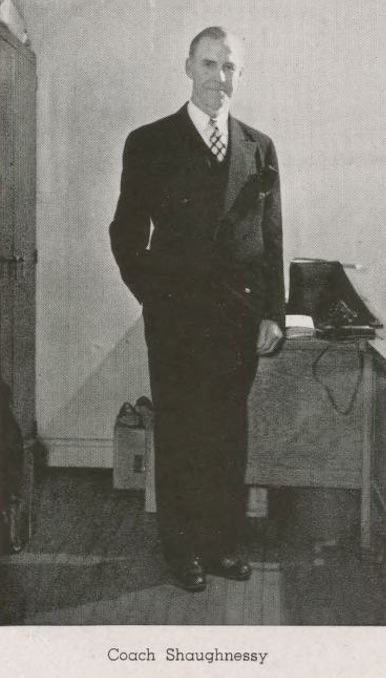
Coach Shaughnessy

After two years as Pitt head coach, Clark Shaughnessy's record was 7–10. In January, the Sun-Telegraph reported that Shaughnessy was not going to replace Elmer Layden as Commissioner of the NFL. In March, when Shaughnessy went to Palo Alto for his daughter's wedding, the rumor mill had him becoming the next head coach at UCLA.

On June 12, he was on the Pitt practice field instructing his 34 incoming freshmen how to operate the T-formation. The freshmen drilled twice a day for two weeks, and then they were given a break before the entire team reported on July 30. Seventeen holdovers from the 1944 squad were among the 53 players who reported the first day. Shaughnessy held morning and afternoon sessions for a few weeks. The squad was given a short break and fall practice opened on August 27.

Coach Shaughnessy told Harry Keck of the Sun-Telegraph: "We still have the same fundamental weaknesses we had during the two wartime seasons through which we struggled, which are that: (1) we can't run fast enough, (2) we're not big enough, and (3) we lack experience, which means that, in the beginning, we may not be too smart.....We're still losing players in the draft and will continue to lose them, but for many of the players the war worry is over."

Larry Bondy, sports editor of The Pitt News, was critical of the student spirit: "The Panthers are a fighting club this year and aim to bring back Pittsburgh's glory; the only thing they need now is the backing of the student body. The student spirit has been lacking for years, possibly because of the war. Now that it's over it's about time we began cheering and coming out."

== Coaching staff ==
1945 Pittsburgh Panthers football staff
Coaching staff: Clark Shaughnessy – head coach; Charles Hartwig – chief assistant coach; Robert Hoel – assistant end coach; Stan Olenn – assistant line coach	Support staff: James Hagan - director of athletics; Frank Carver – publicity director; Howard Waite - trainer; Jim Dimitroff – varsity student manager; Harold Whitson – property manager

== Roster ==
1945 Pittsburgh Panthers football roster
Player	Position	Games	Weight	Height	Class	Prep School	Hometown
Joe Adlesic	quarterback	2	160	5 ft 9 in	freshman	North Catholic H. S.	Pittsburgh, PA
Michael Banasick*	halfback	7	180	6 ft	sophomore	Scottdale H. S.	Scottdale, PA
Stewart Brown	guard	0	180	5 ft 7 in	freshman	Schenley H. S.	Pittsburgh, PA
Herman Butiste	guard	1	187	5 ft 10 in	sophomore	Grove City H. S.	Oil City, PA
Allen Carter	halfback	3	145	5 ft 8 in	freshman	Westinghouse H. S.	Pittsburgh, PA
Daniel Cerrone*	tackle	9	240	6 ft 3 in	freshman	Braddock H. S.	Braddock, PA
Anthony Chuffi*	tackle	10	202	5 ft 9 in	freshman	Peabody H. S.	Pittsburgh, PA
James Cintani	guard	1	170	5 ft 9 in	freshman	Elwood City H. S.	Elwood City, PA
Henry Clougherty*	center	3	185	5 ft 8 in	junior	Swissvale H. S.	Swissvale, PA
Ralph Consolmagno	fullback	0	180	5 ft 11 in	freshman	South Hills H. S.	Pittsburgh, PA
Gerald Cornwell	guard	0	178	5 ft 11 in	freshman	Williamsport H.S.	Williamsport, PA
Samuel Cosentino	fullback	0	180	5 ft 10 in	sophomore	Avalon H. S.	Avalon, PA
Peter Daley	halfback	0	168	5 ft 6 in	freshman	Brownsville H. S.	Brownsville, PA
Joseph DeFrank*	tackle	7	213	5 ft 11 in	junior	German Twp. H.S.	New Salem, PA
John Dombrosky	center	0	195	5 ft 6 in	freshman	Carnegie H. S.	Carnegie, PA
Herbert Douglas*	halfback	7	155	5 ft 8 in	freshman	Taylor Allderdice H. S.	Pittsburgh, PA
Frank Druda	tackle	0	195	5 ft 11 in	freshman	Lincoln H. S.	Ellwood City, PA
Norman Dundas	halfback	2	160	5 ft 9 in	freshman	Academy H. S.	Erie, PA
Dominick Faraoni*	end	5	180	6 ft 1 in	freshman	Elwood City H. S.	Elwood City, PA
James Foley*	fullback	9	182	6 ft	freshman	LaSalle H. S.	Niagara Falls, NY
Matthew Gibson, Jr.	fullback	0	190	6 ft 1 in	freshman	St. Vincent Prep	Pittsburgh, PA
Eugene Gleason	halfback	0	160	5 ft 11 in	freshman	Central H. S.	Scranton, PA
James Hayhurst	guard	2	197	5 ft 11 in	sophomore	East Fairmont H. S.	Fairmont, WV
Richard Johns	halfback	0	160	5 ft 9 in	sophomore	Butler H. S.	Butler, PA
George Johnson*	tackle	10	205	6 ft 4 in	freshman	German Twp. H. S.	Edenborn, PA
James Kline	halfback	0	170	5 ft 11 in	freshman	Norwin H. S.	Ardara, PA
George Kohut	tackle	2	195	6 ft	sophomore	Bethel H. S.	Coverdale, PA
John Kosh*	center	8	195	6 ft	sophomore	Donora H. S.	Donora, PA
Donald Kuntz	end	0	190	6 ft 2 in	freshman	John Harris H. S.	Harrisburg, PA
Frank Lengjak	center	0	167	5 ft 11 in	sophomore	North Union H. S.	Uniontown, PA
John L. Lewis, Jr.	end	0	190	6 ft	junior	R. J. Reynolds H. S.	Winston-Salem, NC
George Linelli	halfback	4	168	5 ft 7 in	junior	Peabody H. S.	Pittsburgh, PA
John Lozar	fullback	3	185	5 ft 10 in	junior	German Twp. H. S.	Adah, PA
William McPeak*	end	10	187	6 ft 1 in	freshman	New Castle H. S.	New Castle, PA
Hugh McRandal	center	0	174	5 ft 11 in	freshman	Aspinwall H. S.	Blawnox, PA
Vincent Manauzzi	halfback	3	160	5 ft 9 in	freshman	Butler H. S.	Butler, PA
Charles Marburger	tackle	0	226	5 ft 11 in	freshman	Mars H. S.	Mars, PA
Donald Matthews*	halfback	6	168	5 ft 10 in	senior	Coatesville H. S.	Coatesville, PA
Francis Mattioli*	guard	7	205	5 ft 10 in	Dental School	Har-Brack H. S.	Brackenridge, PA
William Mihm*	end	7	180	6 ft 1 in	freshman	Westinghouse H. S.	Pittsburgh, PA
Denver Newman*	end	5	165	5 ft 11in	sophomore	New Castle H. S.	New Castle, PA
Paul Oberkircher	guard	0	180	6 ft	senior	Erie Strong Vincent H. S.	Erie, PA
John Pager	quarterback	0	176	5 ft 9 in	junior	St. Veronica H. S.	Aliquippa, PA
Harry Peterson	quarterback	2	175	5 ft 11 in	sophomore	Ellsworth H. S/.	Cokeburg, PA
E. Alexander Phillips	halfback	0	175	5 ft 11 in	sophomore	Blacksville H. S.	Blacksville, WV
Steve Polach*	guard	9	170	5 ft 8 in	junior	North Union Twp. H. S.	Uniontown, PA
Edmund Ralko*	halfback	8	175	5 ft 8 in	freshman	Cumberland Twp. H. S.	Nemacolin, PA
George Ranii*	guard	10	205	5 ft 10 in	junior	Aspinwall H. S.	Blawnox, PA
Frank Reck	end	0	195	6 ft 2 in	freshman	East Deer H. S.	Glassmere, PA
Frank Robertson	end	0	145	5 ft 10 in	freshman	Johnstown H. S.	Johnstown, PA
James Robinson*	halfback	10	180	6 ft	freshman	Connellsville H. S.	Connellville, PA
Michael Roussos*	tackle	9	220	6 ft 2 in	sophomore	New Castle H. S.	New Castle, PA
John Rozanski*	tackle	10	203	5 ft 10 in	sophomore	Plymouth H. S.	Plymouth, PA
Leslie Sarles	end	0	183	6 ft 2in	sophomore	Butler H. S.	Butlar, PA
Leo Skladany*	end	10	186	6 ft 1 in	freshman	Plymouth H. S.	Plymouth, PA
Robert Slack	end	0	172	6 ft	freshman	Aspiwall H. S.	Harwick, PA
Edmund Slater	end	0	165	5 ft 11 in	sophomore	North Union H. S.	Uniontown, PA
Edward Smith*	center	7	210	6 ft 3 in	freshman	McKeesport H. S.	McKeesport, PA
Ernest Smith	center	0	180	5 ft 10 in	freshman	East Deer H. S.	Creighton, PA
Jack Smodic*	quarterback	10	174	5 ft 10 in	freshman	German Twp. H. S.	Gates, PA
James Stopford*	center	6	188	6 ft	freshman	John Harris H. S.	Harrisburg, PA
Edward Sudzina	halfback	1	160	5 ft 8 in	freshman	Duquesne H. S.	Duquesne, PA
John Tarantino	halfback	0	175	5 ft 11 in	freshman	Scranton Central H. S.	Scranton, PA
Michael Temenoff*	halfback	5	205	6 ft 1 in	freshman	West Bethlehem H. S.	Marianna, PA
Kenneth Weinbel	guard	0	180	5 ft 9 in	freshman	Lodi H. S.	East Patterson, NJ
Harold Wertman*	fullback	10	180	6 ft	freshman	Coal Twp. H. S.	Shamokin, PA
Eugene Wojciechowski	tackle	1	195	6 ft	sophomore	Vandergrift H. S.	Vandergrift, PA
William Wolff*	quarterback	7	173	5 ft 10 in	freshman	St. Clair H. S.	St. Clair, PA
Albert Zellman*	end	3	185	6 ft	sophomore	South Hills H. S.	Pittsburgh, PA
Edward Zimmovan*	halfback	9	180	6 ft	sophomore	North Union H. S.	Uniontown, PA
* Letterman

== Game summaries ==
=== at Illinois ===
Week 1: Pitt at Illinois

Team	1	2	3	4	Total
Pitt	0	0	0	6	6
• Illinois	9	0	0	14	23

- Date: September 22, 1945
- Location: Memorial Stadium
  Champaign, IL
- Game start: 2:00 p.m.
- Game attendance: 9,962
- Game weather: sunny
- Referee: Rollie Barnum (Wisconsin)

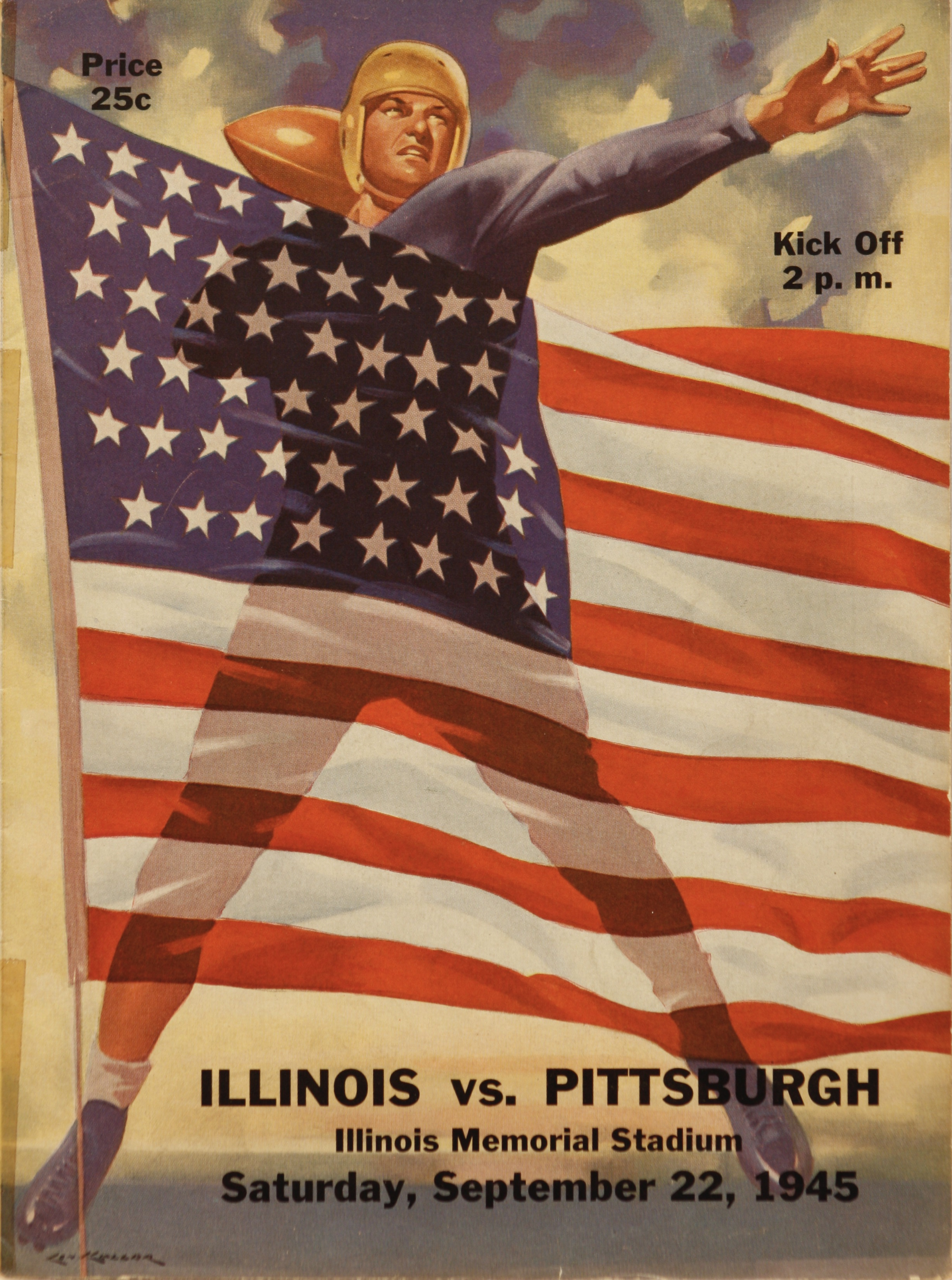
Program for September 22 game versus Illinois

On September 22, the Panthers opened their season against the Fighting Illini in Champaign, IL. Illinois led the series 2–0. Illinois starting halfback Eddie McGovern had an emergency appendectomy Friday morning and was replaced by freshman Tom Zaborac. Coach Ray Eliot's starting line-up had 2 seniors, 5 juniors, 3 sophomores and 1 freshman. The starting line averaged 205 pounds and was composed of 6 lettermen and 1 holdover reserve.

Pitt started 1 senior, 1 junior, 2 sophomores and 7 freshmen. Coach Shaughnessy was upbeat: "Why, our first three quarterbacks never played quarterback before, but, over-all, we're much better than last year." Jimmy Joe Robinson, Herbert Douglas and Allen Carter, Pitt's first African-American players, made the final roster.

Illinois kept the Panthers losing streak against the Western Conference alive, as they beat the Panthers 23–6. In the opening period, Illinois tackle, Les Bingaman, blocked Leo Skladaney's punt into the end zone. Pitt guard George Ranii recovered the ball for a safety. On Illinois' next possession, Pitt was guilty of pass interference in the end zone and the ball was placed at the 1-yard line. Bill Butkovich scored on second down. He added the point after and Illinois led 9–0. Then, the Panthers sustained their longest drive of the day and drove to the Illinois 1-yard line, but could not score. The second and third quarters were scoreless. Late in the third period, Illinois gained possession on the Pitt 37-yard line. They advanced the ball to the 11-yard line at the end of the period. On the second play of the final stanza, Butkovich went through center for the score. His placement made the score 16–0. Illini halfback, Eddie Bray, scored their final touchdown on a 38-yard scamper around left tackle. Bingaman kicked the point after. The Panthers answered with a 62-yard drive, highlighted by the passing of quarterback William Wolff. Wolff was 9 of 23 for 163 yards for the game. Ed Zimmovan scored on a 1-yard run to end the drive. Mike Roussos' placement attempt was low and the final read 23–6. Illinois finished the season with a 2–6–1 record.

The Pitt starting line-up for the game against Illinois was Leo Skladany (left end), Anthony Chuffi (left tackle), Francis Mattioli (left guard), John Kosh (center), George Ranii (right guard), George Johnson (right tackle), Bill McPeak (right end), William Wolff (quarterback), James Robinson (left halfback), Ed Zimmovan (right halfback) and James Foley (fullback). Substitutes appearing in the game for Pitt were Mike Banasick, Dominick Faraoni, Michael Roussos, John Rozanski, George Kohut, Steve Polach, Edward Smith, Edmund Ralko, Jack Smodic, Harry Peterson, Allen Carter, Herbert Douglas and Harold Wertman.

Scoring summary

Quarter	Time	Drive			Team	Scoring information	Score	
Quarter	Time	Plays	Yards	TOP	Team	Scoring information	Pittsburgh	Illinois
1					Illinois	Les Bingham blocked Leo Skladany”s punt and George Ranii fell on it in the end zone	0	2
1					Illinois	Bill Butkovich 1-yard touchdown run, Bill Butkovich kick good	0	9
4		4	37		Illinois	Bill Butkovich 3-yard touchdown run, Bill Butkovich kick good	0	16
4					Illinois	Eddie Bray 38-yard touchdown run, Les Bingaman kick good	0	23
4					Pittsburgh	Ed Zimmovan 1-yard touchdown run, Mike Roussos kick no good (low)	6	23
"TOP" = time of possession. For other American football terms, see Glossary of American football.							6	23

=== West Virginia ===
Week 2: West Virginia at Pitt

Team	1	2	3	4	Total
West Virginia	0	0	7	0	7
• Pitt	7	13	0	0	20

- Date: September 29, 1945
- Location: Pitt Stadium
  Pittsburgh, PA
- Game start: 2:00 p.m.
- Game attendance: 7,500–10,000
- Game weather: rain
- Referee: Harry O. Dayhoff (Bucknell)

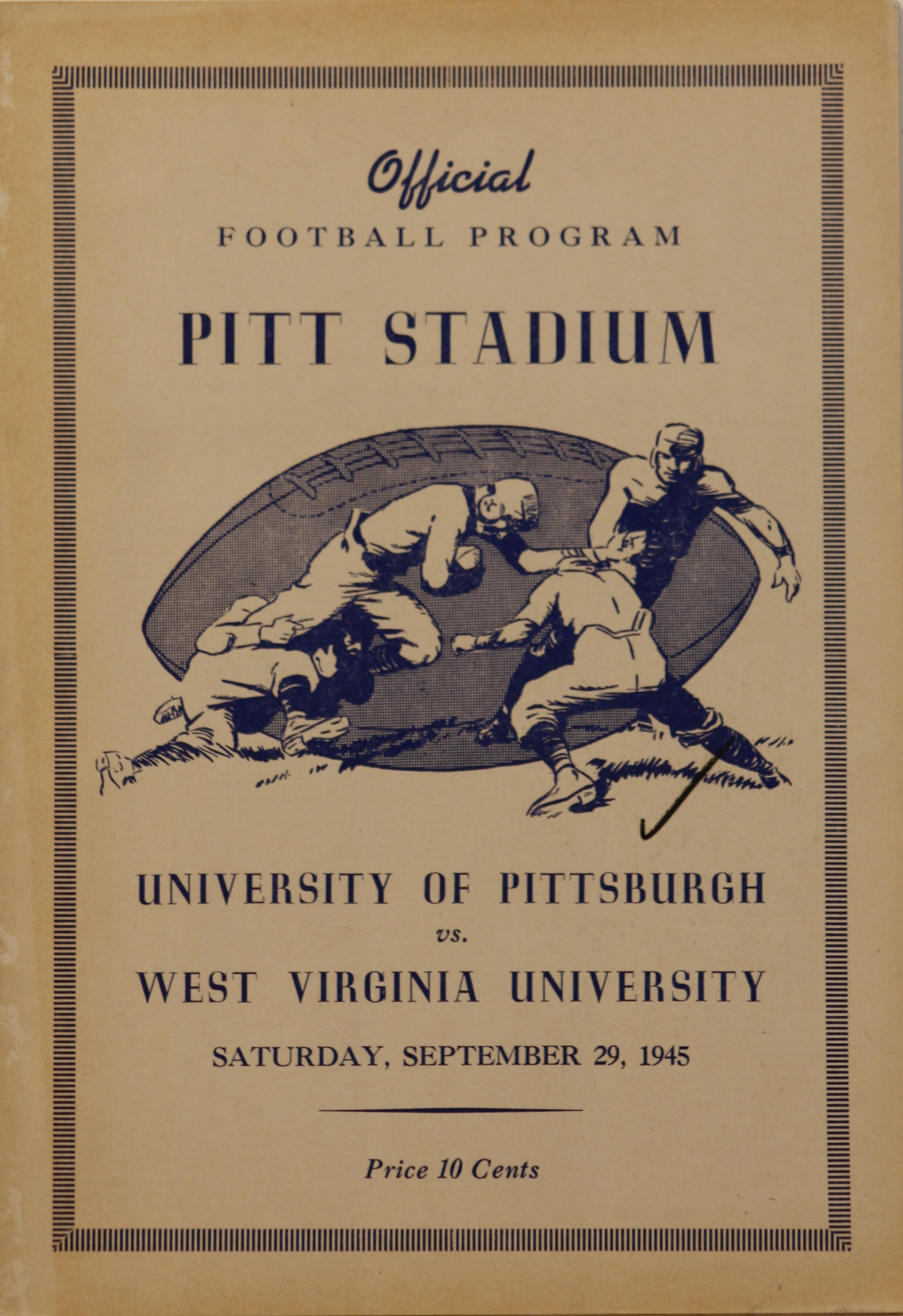
Program for September 29 game versus West Virginia

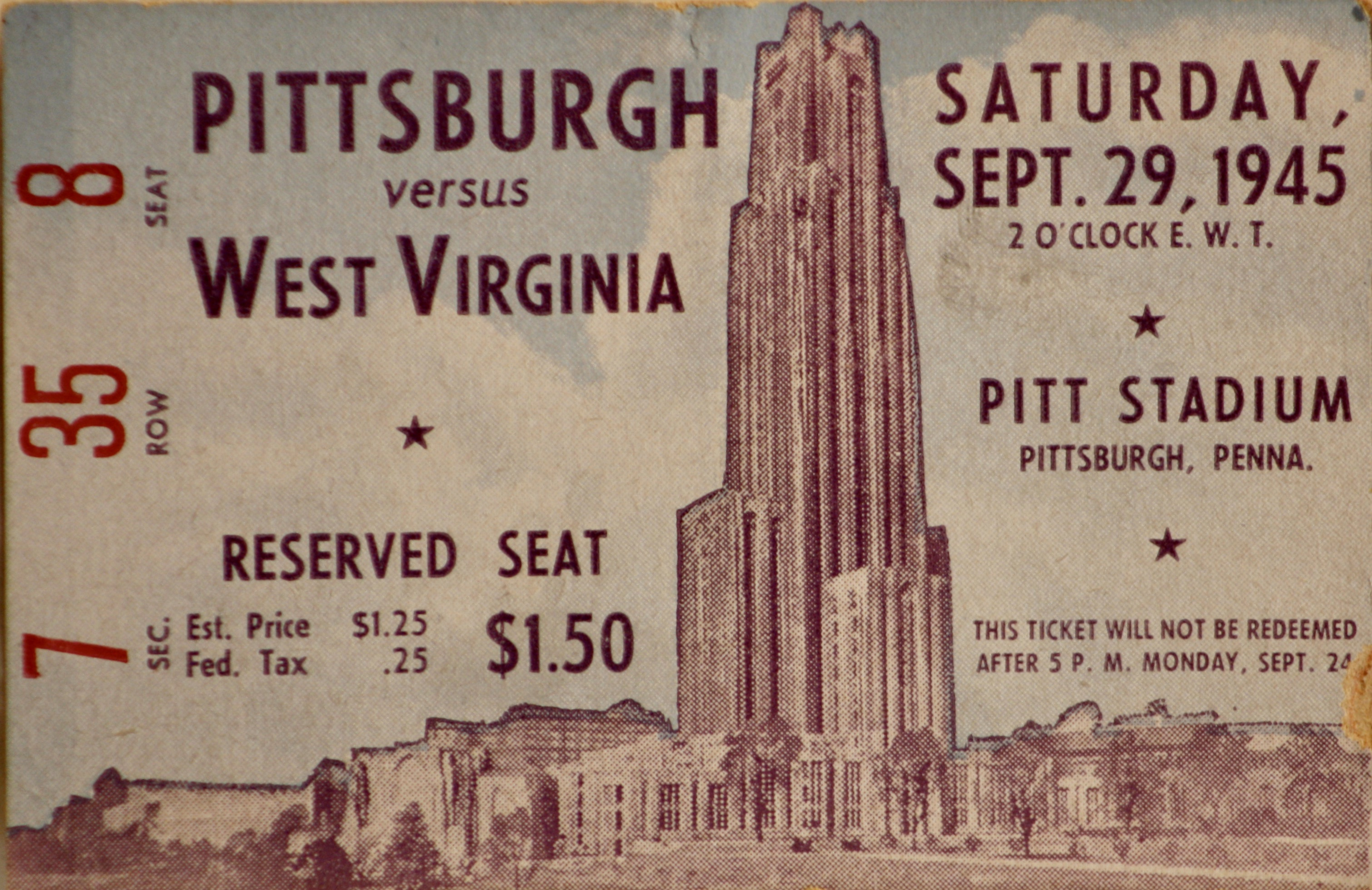
Ticket stub for September 29 game versus West Virginia

On September 9, the Panthers hosted the West Virginia Mountaineers. Pitt held a commanding 28–8–1 lead in the all-time series. Coach Ira Rodgers was in his third year as replacement for head coach Bill Kern, who was in the Navy. The Mountaineers opened their season with a 42–7 win over Otterbein College. Starting quarterback, Hal McKibben, suffered an injury in the Otterbein game and would not play. Coach Rogers told The Pittsburgh Press: "We're too young. There's still no substitute for experience."

Coach Shaughnessy used the same starting lineup as the Illinois game, except at fullback, where Harold Werkman replaced James Foley.

In front of 7500–10,000 rain-soaked fans, the Panthers made it 14 in a row over the Mountaineers with a 20–0 shutout. Pitt scored late in the first period on a 51-yard, 9-play drive. Former tackle, Mike Roussos, lined up at fullback and went through center from the 1-yard line for the score. He booted the extra point and Pitt led 7–0. Late in the first quarter, Pitt guard George Ranii recovered a Mountaineer fumble on the West Virginia 23-yard line. On the third play of the second period, James Robinson skirted right end into the end zone untouched from the 7-yard line. Roussos added the placement and Pitt led 14–0. At the end of the half, the Panther offense drove 64-yards in 12 plays with George Linelli rushing the final 3 yards. The placement center snap was fumbled, and Pitt led 20–0 at halftime. The Panthers dominated the statistics gaining 360 yards to 81, and earning 18 first downs to 4 for the visitors. But dropped passes and fumbles stymied their offense in the scoreless second half.

The Pitt starting lineup for the game against West Virginia was Leo Skladany (left end), Anthony Chuffi (left tackle), Francis Mattioli (left guard), John Kosh (center), George Ranii (right guard), George Johnson (right tackle), William McPeak (right end), William Wolff (quarterback), James Robinson (left halfback), Ed Zimmovan (right halfback) and Harold Werkman (fullback). Substitutes appearing in the game for Pitt were Dominick Faraoni, William Mihm, Michael Banasick, Denver Newman, John Rozanski, Joseph DeFrank, George Kohut, Daniel Cerrone, Herman Butiste, James Hayhurst, Steve Polach, Edward Smith, James Stopford, James Foley, Edmund Ralko, Jack Smodic, Norman Dundas, Michael Roussos, Herbert Douglas, Harry Peterson, George Linelli, Allen Carter, Donald Matthews and Edward Sudzina. George Ranii was named captain for the game.

Scoring summary

Quarter	Time	Drive			Team	Scoring information	Score	
Quarter	Time	Plays	Yards	TOP	Team	Scoring information	West Virginia	Pittsburgh
1		9	51		Pittsburgh	Michael Roussos 1-yard touchdown run, Michael Roussos kick good	0	7
2		5	23		Pittsburgh	James Robinson 7-yard touchdown run, Michael Roussos kick good	0	14
2		12	64		Pittsburgh	George Linelli 1-yard touchdown run, Michael Roussos kick no good (fumbled snap from center)	0	20
"TOP" = time of possession. For other American football terms, see Glossary of American football.							0	20

=== Bucknell ===
Week 3: Bucknell at Pitt

Team	1	2	3	4	Total
Bucknell	0	0	0	0	0
• Pitt	6	14	12	6	38

- Date: October 6, 1945
- Location: Pitt Stadium
  Pittsburgh, PA
- Game start: 2:00 p.m.
- Game attendance: 10,000
- Game weather: cloudy, muddy field
- Referee: Yans Wallace

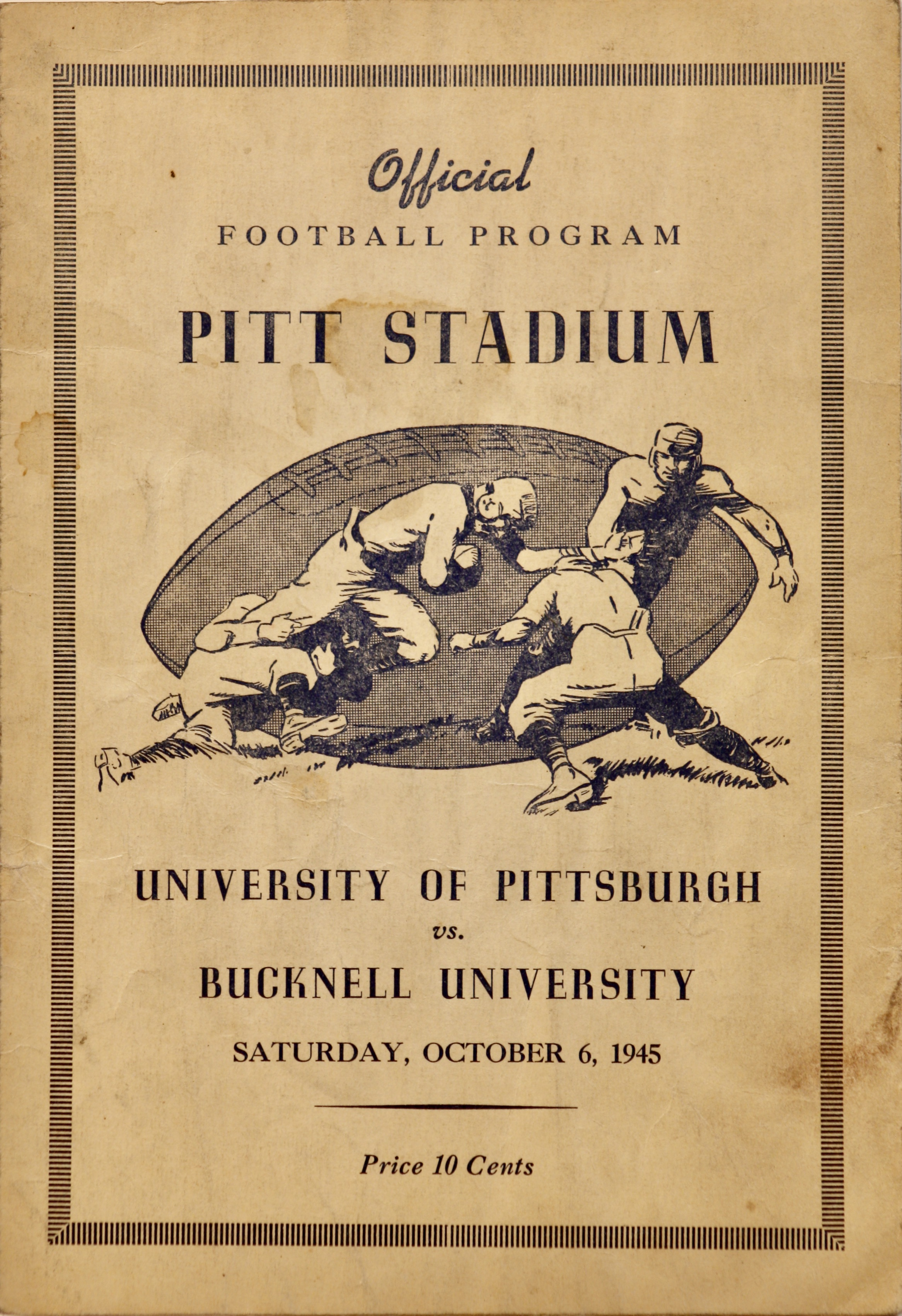
Program for October 6 game versus Bucknell

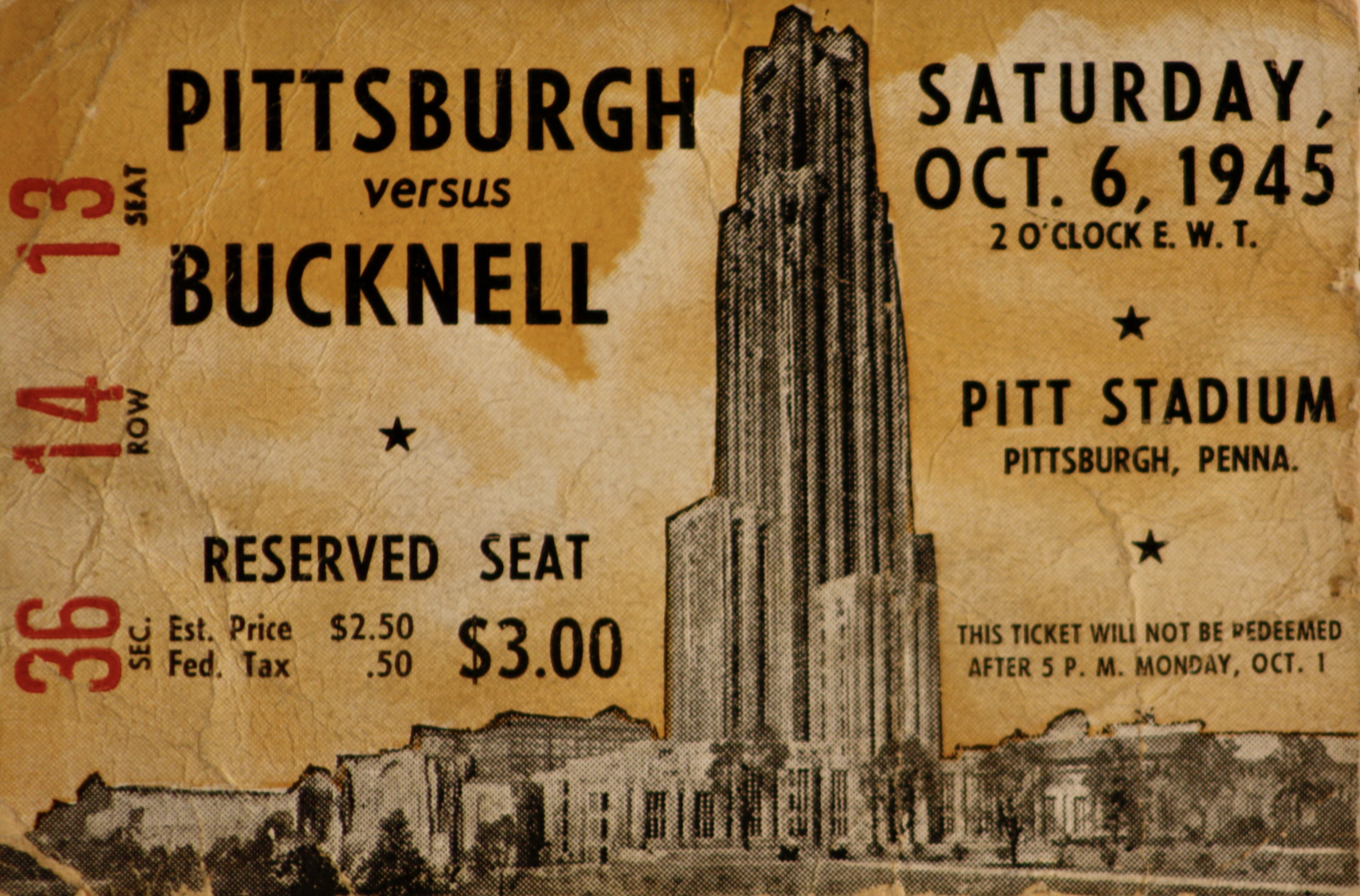
Ticket stub for October 6 game versus Bucknell

After a lapse of 22 years, Pitt renewed football relations with the Bucknell Bison on October 6. Pitt led the series 5–2. Coach J. Ellwood Ludwig led the Bison to a 7–2–1 record in 1944. The 1945 squad was 1–2, having beaten the University of Scranton in their opener, and losing to Villanova and Cornell. While at Bucknell, Ludwig also coached the basketball and baseball teams.

Coach Shaughnessy told the Post-Gazette: "I plan on starting the usual combination of Billy Wolff, Jim Robinson, Ed Zimmovan and Jim Foley. However, if we kick off I will use Mike Roussos at fullback in place of Foley so the New Castle boy can boot the ball. The line will be the same as last week against West Virginia."

The Panthers romped to a 38–0 victory over the out-manned Bucknell eleven. Tackle turned fullback, Mike Roussos accounted for twenty points as he scored three touchdowns and added two extra points. He opened the scoring with a 2-yard plunge to cap an 11-play, 57-yard drive. His backfield mates, James Foley and James Robinson, scored the next two touchdowns and Roussos added the placements for a 20–0 halftime lead. Early in the third quarter, Roussos broke through the Bucknell line for a 57-yard touchdown run and, after a change of possessions, capped off his day with a 7-yard scoring run. In the final quarter, future Olympian, Herbert Douglas scored the final Pitt touchdown on an 11-yard scamper around right end.

The Pitt Marching Band performed at halftime for the first time in several seasons.

The Pitt starting lineup for the game against Bucknell was Leo Skladany (left end), Anthony Chuffi (left tackle), Francis Mattioli (left guard), John Kosh (center), George Ranii (right guard), George Johnson (right tackle), William McPeak (right end), William Wolff (quarterback), James Robinson (left halfback), Ed Zimmovan (right halfback) and Michael Roussos (fullback). Substitutes appearing in the game for Pitt were Dominick Faraoni, William Mihm, Michael Banasick, Denver Newman, John Rozanski, Joseph DeFrank, Daniel Cerrone, James Hayhurst, Steve Polach, Edward Smith, James Foley, Edmund Ralko, Jack Smodic, Norman Dundas, Michael Roussos, Herbert Douglas, Harry Peterson, George Linelli, Allen Carter, Donald Matthews, Joseph Adlesic, Harold Wertman and John Lozar. Ed Zimmovan was named captain for the game.

Scoring summary

Quarter	Time	Drive			Team	Scoring information	Score	
Quarter	Time	Plays	Yards	TOP	Team	Scoring information	Bucknell	Pittsburgh
1		11	57		Pittsburgh	Michael Roussos 2-yard touchdown run, Michael Roussos kick no good	0	6
2		6	16		Pittsburgh	James Foley 3-yard touchdown run, Michael Roussos kick good	0	13
2		5	42		Pittsburgh	James Robinson 7-yard touchdown run, Michael Roussos kick good	0	20
3		2	64		Pittsburgh	Michael Roussos 57-yard touchdown run, George Johnson kick no good	0	26
3		2	34		Pittsburgh	Michael Roussos 7-yard touchdown run, Michael Roussos kick no good	0	32
4		4	44		Pittsburgh	Herbert Douglas 11-yard touchdown run, Edmund Ralko kick no good (blocked)	0	38
"TOP" = time of possession. For other American football terms, see Glossary of American football.							0	38

=== Michigan State ===
Week 4: Michigan State at Pitt

Team	1	2	3	4	Total
• Michigan State	6	6	0	0	12
Pitt	0	0	0	7	7

- Date: October 13, 1945
- Location: Pitt Stadium
  Pittsburgh, PA
- Game start: 2:00 p.m.
- Game attendance: 12,000
- Game weather: fair and cool
- Referee: Rollie A. Barnum (Wisconsin)

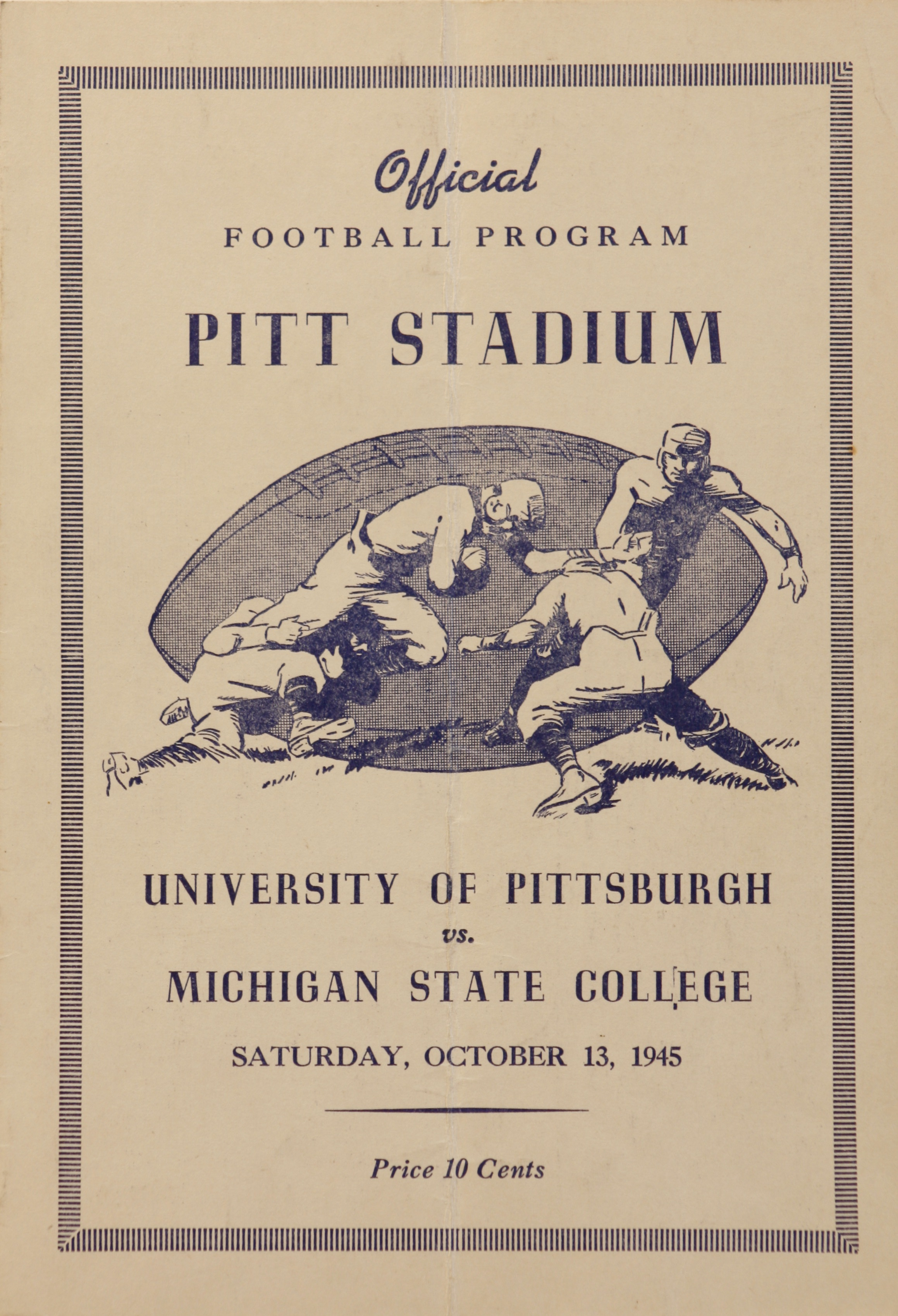
Program for October 13 game versus Michigan State College

On October 13, the Panthers played the Michigan State College Spartans for the first time. The Charlie Bachman-led Spartans were independent and not yet a member of the Western Conference. The Spartans arrived in Pittsburgh with a 1–1 record, having lost their opening game to Michigan (40–0) and then beating Kentucky (7–6). The Spartans utilized the Z-formation offense, which Bachman introduced in 1943 while coaching the Camp Grant squad.

After two wins in a row, Coach Shaughnessy was worried his team was looking ahead to Notre Dame: "Bachman's teams never are easy to beat, and this one is as big and strong as ours. His defeat of Kentucky last Saturday should be sufficient warning for us to be on the alert against a possible upset." Except for Edmund Ralko starting at quarterback, the Pitt lineup remained the same. Center John Kosh was named captain for the game.

Michigan State upset the favored Panthers 12–7. Early in the first quarter, State gained possession on their own 41-yard line. Three pass completions moved the ball to the Pitt 9-yard line. Steve Contos ran around the left side for the score. Bob Malaga's placement went wide. State scored again in the second quarter. Jack Breslin intercepted a Panther pass on the Pitt 33-yard line, and in four plays the State offense advanced the ball to the 3-yard line. From there, Breslin ran around right end for the touchdown. The extra point was blocked and State led 12–0 at halftime. The Pitt offense spent the second half in State territory, but only scored on a 93-yard punt return by James Robinson. Mike Roussos added the extra point.

Coach Bachman told The Press: "We knew they had only Notre Dame in mind, and so we made plans to take advantage of it. Shaughnessy has a green team just as we do, and you just can't figure these freshmen out in advance. One Saturday they're perfect and the very next one they do everything backwards."

The Pitt starting lineup for the game against Michigan State was Leo Skladany (left end), Anthony Chuffi (left tackle), Francis Mattioli (left guard), John Kosh (center), George Ranii (right guard), George Johnson (right tackle), William McPeak (right end), Edmund Ralko (quarterback), James Robinson (left halfback), Ed Zimmovan (right halfback) and Michael Roussos (fullback). Substitutes appearing in the game for Pitt were William Mihm, John Rozanski, Daniel Cerrone, Steve Polach, Edward Smith, William Wolff, Jack Smodic, Herbert Douglas, James Foley, Harold Wertman and John Lozar. John Kosh was named captain for the game.

Scoring summary

Quarter	Time	Drive			Team	Scoring information	Score	
Quarter	Time	Plays	Yards	TOP	Team	Scoring information	Michigan State	Pittsburgh
1		5	59		Michigan State	Steve Contos 9-yard touchdown run, Bob Malaga kick no good (wide)	6	0
2		5	33		Michigan State	Jack Breslin 3-yard touchdown run, Bob Malaga kick no good (blocked)	12	0
4		1	87		Pittsburgh	Punt returned 87 yards for touchdown by James Robinson, Michael Roussos kick good	12	7
"TOP" = time of possession. For other American football terms, see Glossary of American football.							12	7

=== Notre Dame ===
Week 5: Notre Dame at Pitt

Team	1	2	3	4	Total
• Notre Dame	6	6	7	20	39
Pitt	0	2	0	7	9

- Date: October 20, 1945
- Location: Pitt Stadium
  Pittsburgh, PA
- Game start: 2:00 p.m.
- Game attendance: 57,542
- Game weather: sunny
- Referee: Dr. R. W. Huegel (Marquette)

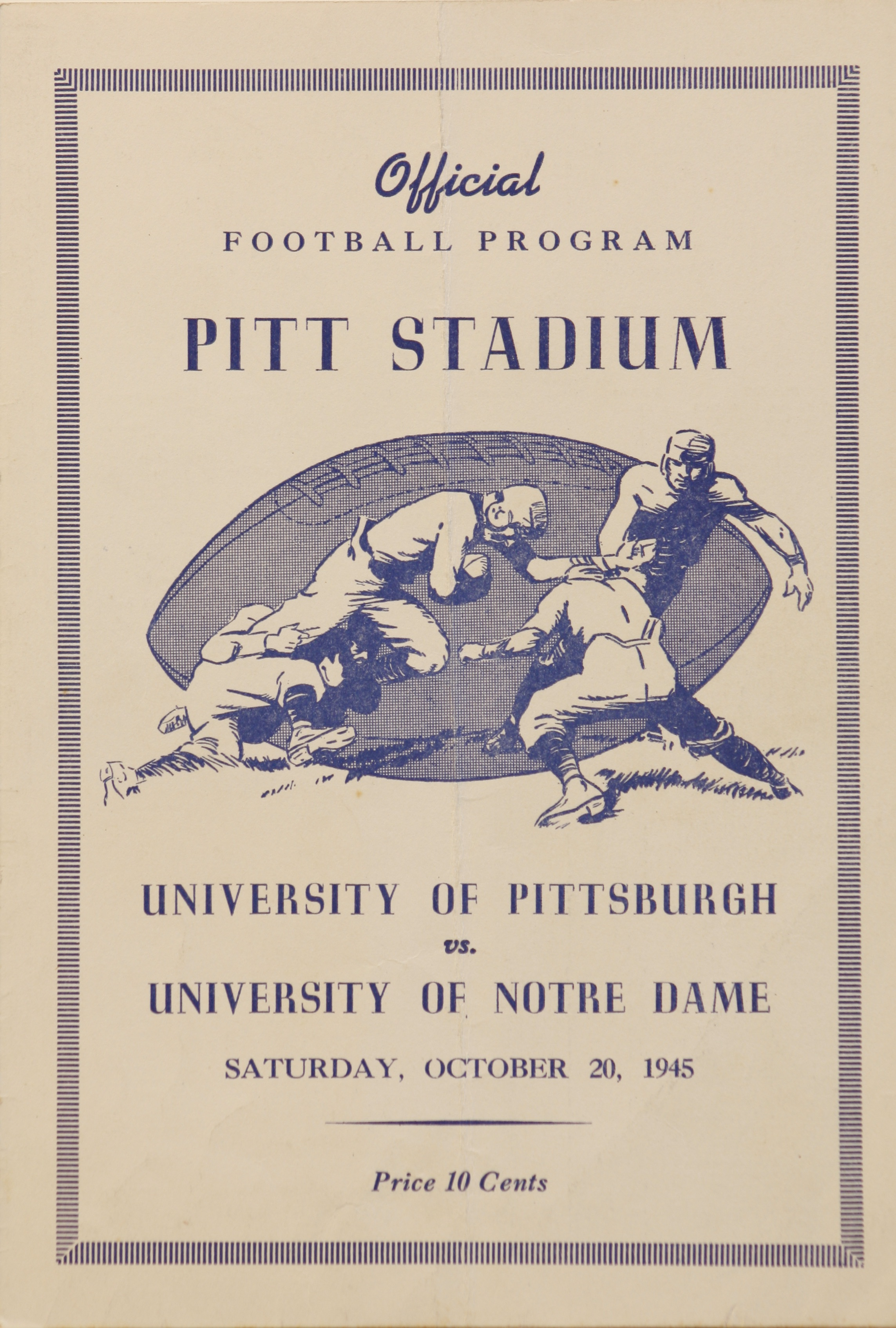
Program for October 20 game versus Notre Dame

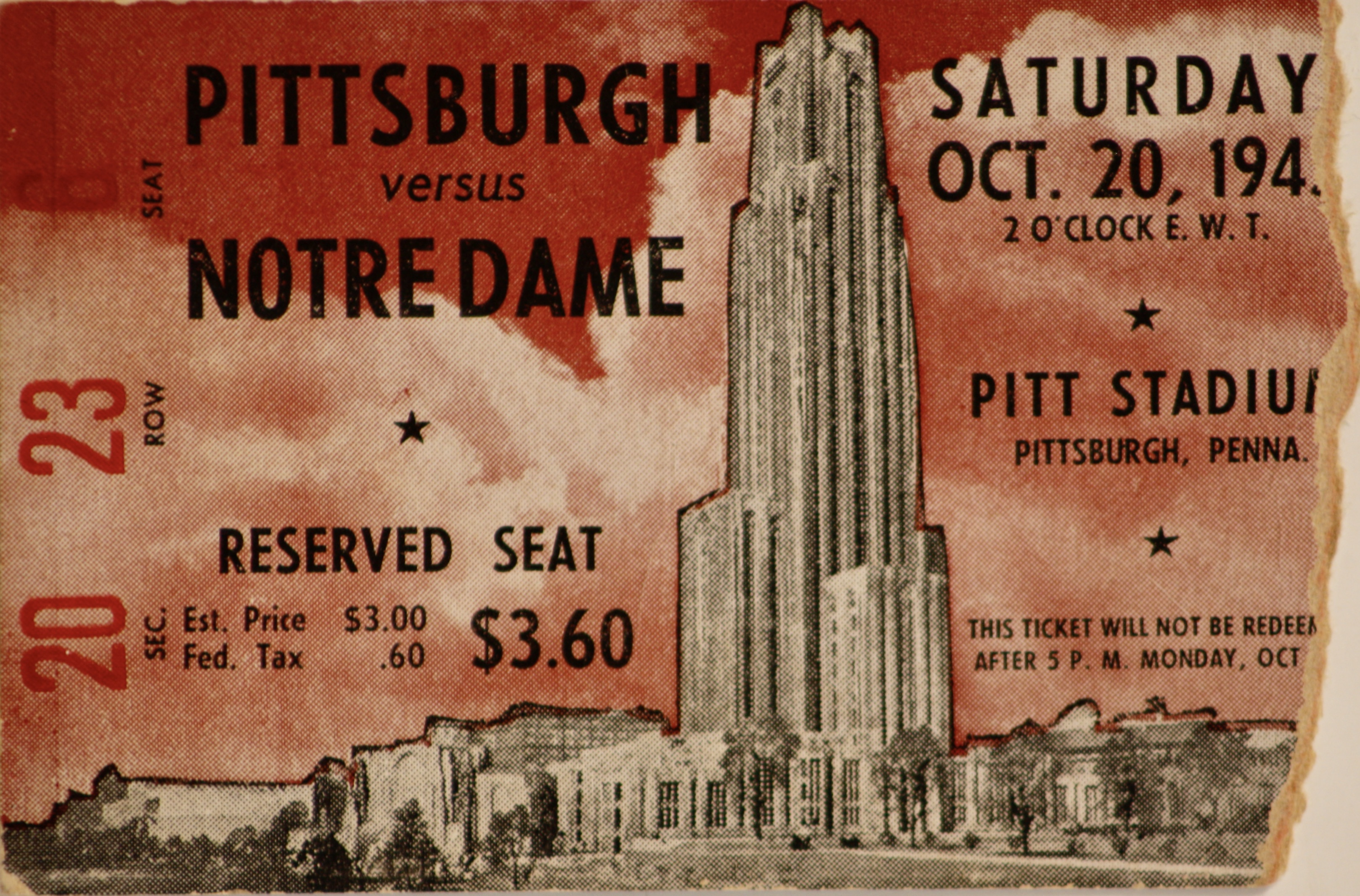
Ticket stub for October 20 game versus Notre Dame

On October 20, the #3 ranked Notre Dame Fighting Irish led by Hugh Devore were highly favored over the Panthers. Notre Dame was undefeated (4–0), having outscored their opposition 81–7. Notre Dame led the all-time series 7–5–1, and the Irish had outscored the Panthers 99–0 in the past 2 games.

At the Friday afternoon Pitt pep rally Coach Shaughnessy stated: "I question whether Notre Dame is good enough to take our measure. We ought to beat Notre Dame."

A capacity crowd watched the Panthers stay close to the Irish through 3 quarters, but Notre Dame scored 3 times in the final period to pull away for a 39–9 victory. In the second quarter, Pitt end Bill McPeak tackled Irish back Terry Brennan in the end zone for a safety. Late in the game, Pitt quarterback, Jack Smodic connected with Herbert Douglas on a 62-yard touchdown pass, and Francis Mattioli added the extra point to account for the Pitt scoring. Notre Dame scored in each quarter. Fullback Frank Ruggerio scored from the 1-yard line in the opening period. Quarterback Frank Dancewicz completed a 10-yard touchdown pass to William Leonard in the second quarter and followed that with a 28-yard scoring pass to Elmer Angsman in the third. Angsman scored again in the final quarter on a 1-yard run. John Panelli scored on a 19-yard dash and Ernest Virok intercepted a Jack Smodic pass and raced 50 yards for the final Irish touchdown. Stan Krivik was good on 3 of 6 extra points. Notre Dame finished the season ranked #9 in the Associated Press poll with a 7–2–1 record.

Jim Costin of The South Bend Tribune noted that Shaughnessy substituted often and the Panthers were "penalized no less than 13 times for too many times out. If that isn't a record for a coach penalizing his own team, it will do for some time, anyhow." Shaughnessy blamed the situation on not being able to determine the placement of the ball. For the next game, he decided to sit in the press box and advise his assistants by telephone.

The Pitt starting lineup for the game against Notre Dame was Leo Skladany (left end), Anthony Chuffi (left tackle), Francis Mattioli (left guard), John Kosh (center), George Ranii (right guard), George Johnson (right tackle), William McPeak (right end), Edmund Ralko (quarterback), James Robinson (left halfback), Ed Zimmovan (right halfback) and Harold Wertman(fullback). Substitutes appearing in the game for Pitt were Dominick Faraoni, William Mihm, Michael Banasick, John Rozanski, Joseph DeFrank, Daniel Cerrone, Steve Polach, Edward Smith, James Stopford, Jack Smodic, Michael Temenoff, Michael Roussos, Herbert Douglas, George Linelli and Donald Matthews. Francis Mattioli and George Ranii were named co-captains for the game.

Scoring summary

Quarter	Time	Drive			Team	Scoring information	Score	
Quarter	Time	Plays	Yards	TOP	Team	Scoring information	Notre Dame	Pittsburgh
1		4	16		Notre Dame	Frank Ruggerio 1-yard touchdown run, Stan Krivik kick no good (wide)	6	0
2					Pittsburgh	Terry Brennan tackled in end zone for a safety by Bill McPeak	6	2
2		7	57		Notre Dame	William Leonard 10-yard touchdown reception from Frank Dancewicz, Stan Krivik kick no good (blocked)	12	2
3		2	29		Notre Dame	Elmer Angsman 28-yard touchdown reception from Frank Dancewicz, Stan Krivik kick good	19	2
4		4	8		Notre Dame	Elmer Angsman 1-yard touchdown run, Stan Krivik kick no good (wide)	25	2
4		4	49		Notre Dame	John Panelli 19-yard touchdown run, Stan Krivik kick good	32	2
4		1	50		Notre Dame	Interception returned yards for touchdown by Ernest Virok, Stan Krivik kick good	39	2
4		2	80		Pittsburgh	Herbert Douglas 62-yard touchdown reception from Jack Smodic, Francis Mattioli kick good	39	9
"TOP" = time of possession. For other American football terms, see Glossary of American football.							39	9

=== Temple ===
Week 6: Temple at Pitt

Team	1	2	3	4	Total
• Temple	6	0	0	0	6
Pitt	0	0	0	0	0

- Date: October 27, 1945
- Location: Pitt Stadium
  Pittsburgh, PA
- Game start: 2:10 p.m.
- Game attendance: 12,000
- Game weather: sunny and cool
- Referee: Joseph H. Williams (Bucknell)

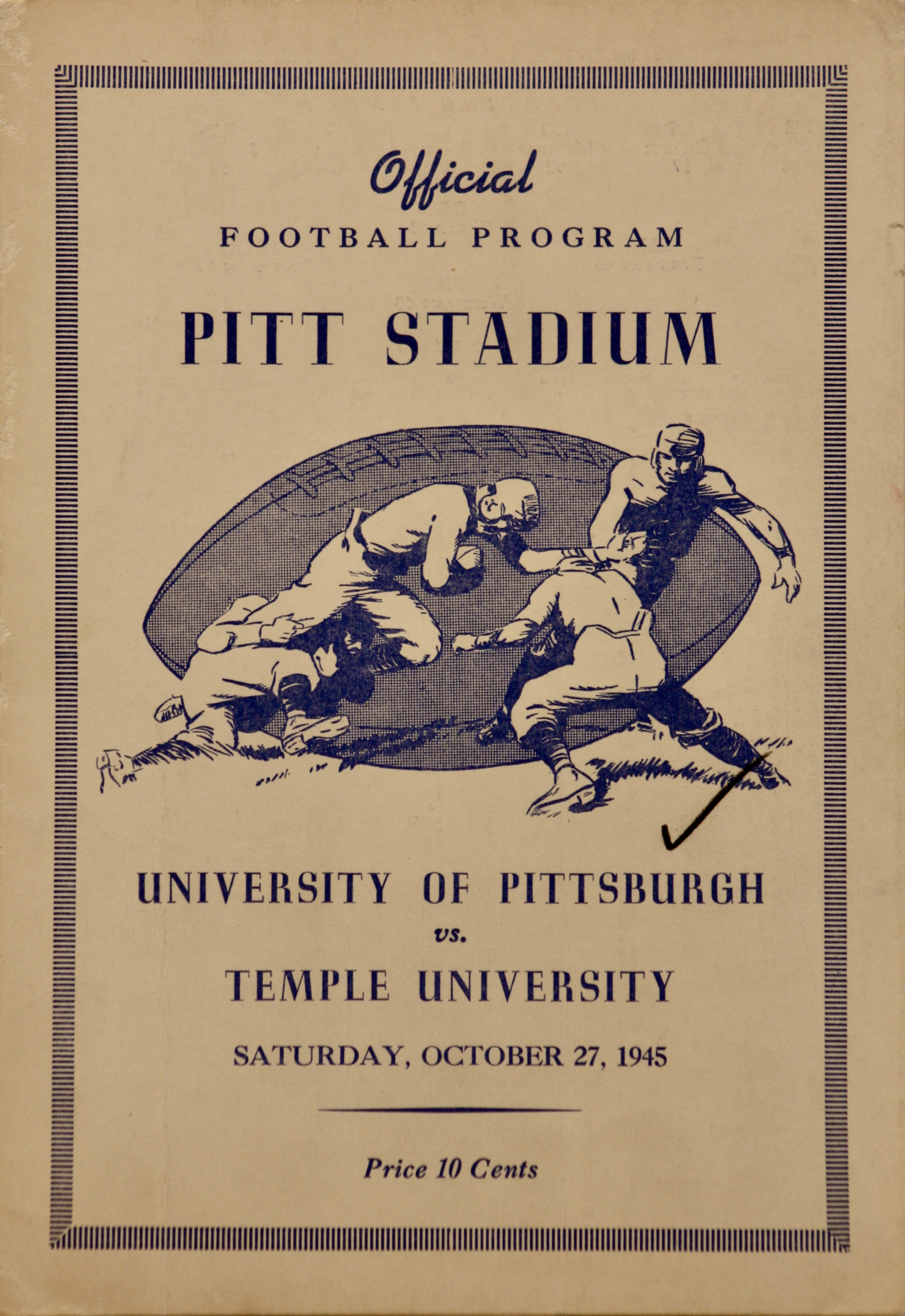
Program for October 27 game versus temple

On October 27, Pitt and Temple met for the third time. The Panthers won the first two meetings played in Philadelphia. Owls coach Ray Morrison was in his sixth season and his squad was unbeaten (4–0), although unranked. They had outscored their opposition 158–18. Coach Morrison started the same lineup that faced West Virginia the previous Saturday.

Pitt center John Kosh was injured in the Notre Dame game and replaced in the starting lineup by freshman Jim Stopford. Coach Shaughnessy watched the game from the press box and telephoned instructions to his assistants.

The Panthers lost for the third week in a row, as the Temple Owls converted a first quarter fumble by halfback Ed Zimmovan into a touchdown, and then shut out the Panther offense the rest of the game to run their record to 5–0. Temple halfback Andy Wolfrum recovered Zimmovan's fumble on the Panther 24-yard line. After a 4-yard gain and 9-yard loss, Temple back, Phillip Slosburg raced 22-yards to the 7-yard line. On second down Slosburg scored through the left side from the 5-yard line. Jimmy Wilson missed the placement. Temple 6–Pitt 0. The Temple defense kept the Panthers out of the end zone the remainder of the game. The Panthers only committed 4 penalties with Shaughnessy in the press box.

The Pitt starting lineup for the game against Temple was Leo Skladany (left end), Anthony Chuffi (left tackle), Francis Mattioli (left guard), James Stopford (center), George Ranii (right guard), George Johnson (right tackle), William McPeak (right end), Jack Smodic (quarterback), James Robinson (left halfback), Ed Zimmovan (right halfback) and Michael Roussos (fullback). Substitutes appearing in the game for Pitt were John Rozanski, Daniel Cerrone, Steve Polach, Joseph Dfrank, Michael Temenoff, William Wolff, Harold Wertman, James Foley, Herbert Douglas and Donald Matthews.

Scoring summary

Quarter	Time	Drive			Team	Scoring information	Score	
Quarter	Time	Plays	Yards	TOP	Team	Scoring information	Temple	Pittsburgh
1		5	24		Temple	Philip Slosburg 5-yard touchdown run, Jimmy Wilson kick no good (wide)	6	0
"TOP" = time of possession. For other American football terms, see Glossary of American football.							6	0

=== at Purdue ===
Week 7: Pitt at Purdue

Team	1	2	3	4	Total
Pitt	0	0	0	0	0
• Purdue	14	7	7	0	28

- Date: November 3, 1945
- Location: Ross-Ade Stadium
  Lafayette, IN
- Game start: 2:00 p.m.
- Game attendance: 15,000
- Game weather: fair and cool
- Referee: Lyle Clarno (Bradley)

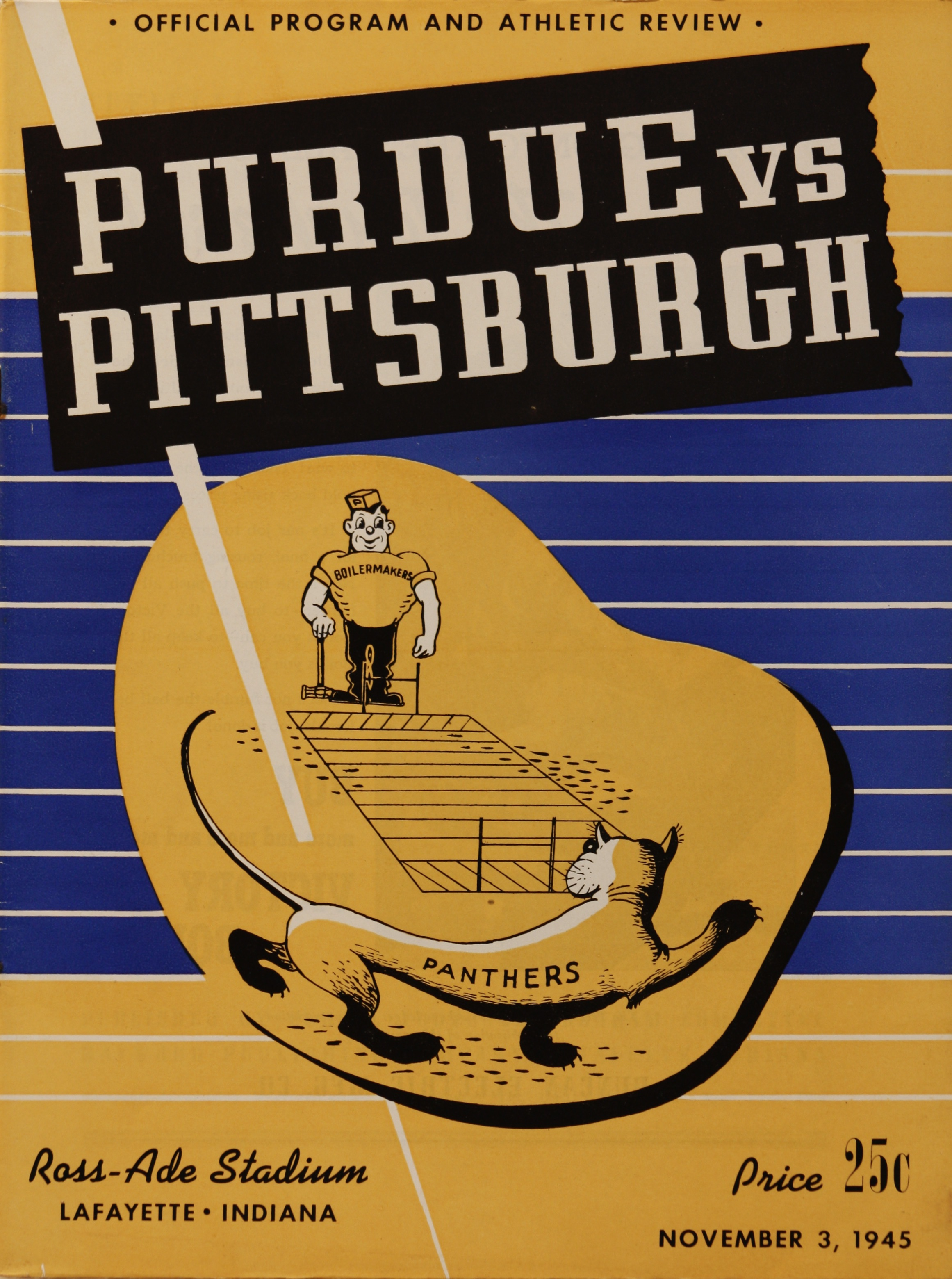
Program for November 3 game versus Purdue

On November 3, the Panthers traveled to Lafayette, IN to play Coach Cecil Isbell's #13 ranked Purdue Boilermakers. In 1941, Purdue won the initial meeting (6–0) at Pitt Stadium. The Boilermakers were 5–1, having lost the previous week to Northwestern (26–14).

Purdue was the first of three straight Western Conference opponents on the Panthers schedule. Pitt was on a 14-game losing streak to Western Conference schools since it began its de-emphasis. Coach Charley Bowser was 0–8, and Coach Shaughnessy was 0–6. Coach Shaughnessy needed to adjust the Panther lineup. Three starters (guard Francis Mattioli, quarterback William Wolff and halfback Ed Zimmovan) were injured in the Temple game and were unable to play. They were replaced by Steve Polach, Jack Smodic and Harold Wertman.

Purdue continued the Western Conference dominance over the Panthers with a 28–0 shutout. In the first period, Purdue halfback Ed Cody first scored on a 10-yard run around Pitt's right end. A short while later he scored on an 11-yard run around Pitt's left end. Tom Hughes added both placements and Purdue led 14–0. Purdue end Paul Gilbert "snatched a fumble 'out of the air' late in the second quarter and dashed 46 yards for a touchdown." The Pitt coaches argued that the ball hit the ground and was an incomplete pass, but the play stood and Hughes added the point after. The final Purdue touchdown came in the third quarter on a 50-yard run by Bill Canfield. Hughes kicked the extra point. Purdue played their substitutes in the final period. The Pitt defense allowed a 15-play drive and an 11-play drive, but kept the Boilermakers out of the end zone. Purdue finished the season ranked #18 with a 7–3 record.

The Pitt starting lineup for the game against Purdue was Leo Skladany (left end), Daniel Cerrone (left tackle), Anthony Chuffi (left guard), John Kosh (center), George Ranii (right guard), George Johnson (right tackle), William McPeak (right end), Jack Smodic (quarterback), James Robinson (left halfback), Harold Wertman (right halfback) and James Foley (fullback). Substitutes appearing in the game for Pitt were Albert Zellman, William Mihm, Michael Banasick, Denver Newman, John Rozanski, James Hayhurst, Eugene Wojiechowski, Joseph DeFrank, Steve Polach, James Cintani, Edward Smith, James Stopford, Joseph Adlesic, Edmund Ralko, George Linelli, Herbert Douglas, Donald Matthews and Vincent Manauzzi.

Scoring summary

Quarter	Time	Drive			Team	Scoring information	Score	
Quarter	Time	Plays	Yards	TOP	Team	Scoring information	Pittsburgh	Purdue
1		6	40		Purdue	Ed Cody 10-yard touchdown run, Tom Hughes kick good	0	7
1		6	68		Purdue	Ed Cody 11-yard touchdown run, Tom Hughes kick good	0	14
2		1	46		Purdue	Fumble recovery returned 46 yards for touchdown by Paul Gilbert, Tom Hughes kick good	0	21
3		1	50		Purdue	Bill Canfield 50-yard touchdown run, Tom Hughes kick good	0	28
"TOP" = time of possession. For other American football terms, see Glossary of American football.							0	28

=== Ohio State ===
Week 8: Ohio State at Pitt

Team	1	2	3	4	Total
• Ohio State	0	0	0	14	14
Pitt	0	0	0	0	0

- Date: November 10, 1945
- Location: Pitt Stadium
  Pittsburgh, PA
- Game start: 2:00 p.m.
- Game attendance: 20,000
- Game weather: rain
- Referee: Dr. R. W. Huegel (Marquette)

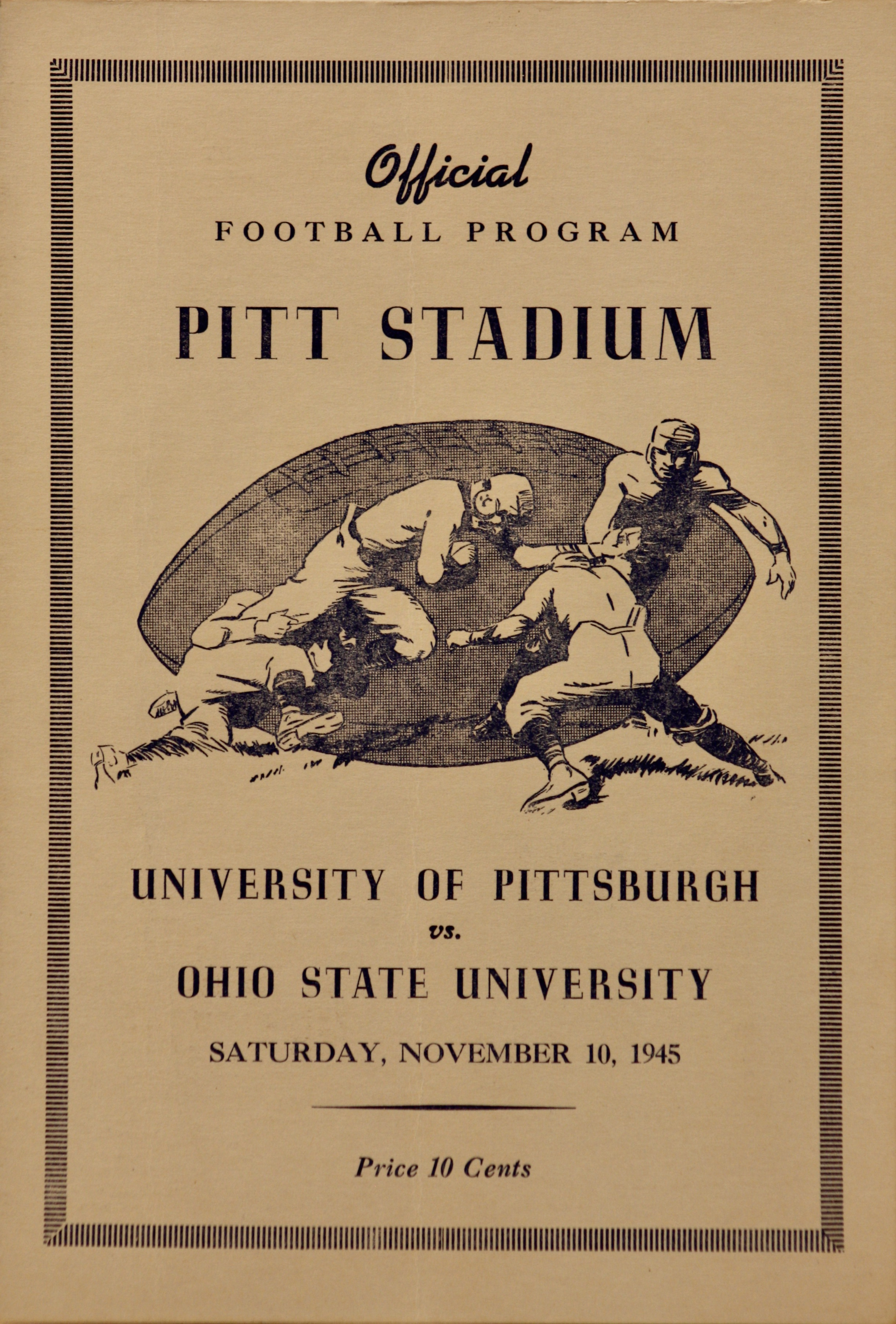
Program for November 10 game versus Ohio State

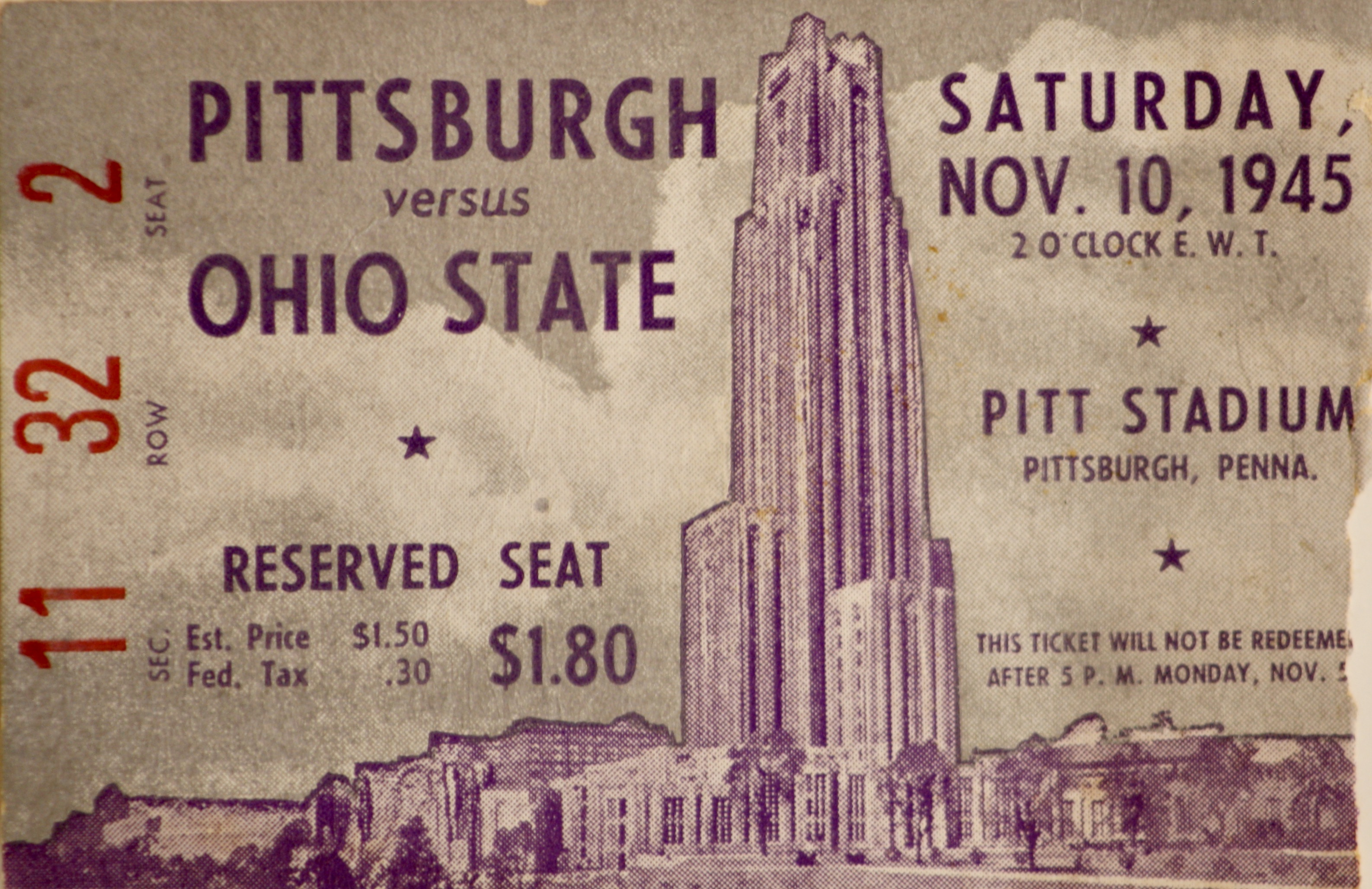
Ticket stub for the November 10 game versus Ohio State

On November 10, the Panthers hosted the #8-ranked Ohio State Buckeyes. Second-year Coach Carroll Widdoes squad was 5–1 on the season, having only lost to Purdue (35–13). The Buckeyes had 16 returning lettermen. Guard Warren Amling was a consensus All-American and fullback Ollie Cline and tackle Russ Thomas were named 1st team All-Conference. State led the series 6–2–1, and had won the past five meetings.

Pitt students circulated a petition to oust Coach Shaughnessy for his supposed coaching errors. The team supported the coach and a demonstration scheduled at a pep rally did not materialize. The players told the press: "We held an informal meeting and decided that the petition was unfair to Coach Shaughnessy. Sponsors of it approached a number of us, but we absolutely refused to sign. In fact, if we get it in our possession you can feel sure that one of us will tear it up. The statements it makes as to our failure to win are silly. We want the public to know that we are behind our coach 100 per cent and will try to beat Ohio State for him on Saturday."

On a rainy day with ankle-deep mud covering the field, the Panthers lost to the Ohio State Buckeyes 14 to 0. For three quarters the defenses kept the game scoreless. Ohio State threatened 4 times in the second quarter, but the Panther defense prevailed. At the end of the third period the Panther offense advanced to the State 13-yard line, but turned the ball over on downs. The State offense then went 88 yards in 5 plays, with halfback Alex Verdona scoring on an 18-yard end run. On the Buckeyes next possession, fullback Ollie Cline dashed 63-yards through the middle of the Panther line for the second touchdown. Max Schnittker converted both placements. The Panthers suffered their third shutout and fifth loss in a row. Ohio State finished the season ranked #12 with a 7–2 record.

The Pitt starting lineup for the game against Ohio State was Leo Skladany (left end), Daniel Cerrone (left tackle), Anthony Chuffi (left guard), John Kosh (center), George Ranii (right guard), Michael Roussos (right tackle), William McPeak (right end), Jack Smodic (quarterback), James Robinson (left halfback), Edward Zimmovan (right halfback) and Harold Wertman (fullback). Substitutes appearing in the game for Pitt were Dominick Faraoni, William Mihm, Michael Banasick, Denver Newman, Albert Zellman, John Rozanski, Joseph DeFrank, Steve Polach, Henry Clougherty, Michael Temenoff, William Wolff, Vincent Manuzzi, Edmund Ralko, John Lozar and James Foley.

Scoring summary

Quarter	Time	Drive			Team	Scoring information	Score	
Quarter	Time	Plays	Yards	TOP	Team	Scoring information	Ohio State	Pittsburgh
4		7	87		Ohio State	Alex Verdona 18-yard touchdown run, Max Schnittker kick good	7	0
4		1	63		Ohio State	Ollie Cline 63-yard touchdown run, Max Schnittker kick good	14	0
"TOP" = time of possession. For other American football terms, see Glossary of American football.							14	0

=== Indiana ===
Week 9: Indiana at Pitt

Team	1	2	3	4	Total
• Indiana	6	0	13	0	19
Pitt	0	0	0	0	0

- Date: November 17, 1945
- Location: Pitt Stadium
  Pittsburgh, PA
- Game start: 2:00 p.m.
- Game attendance: 5,000
- Game weather: rain
- Referee: Mike Layden (Notre Dame)

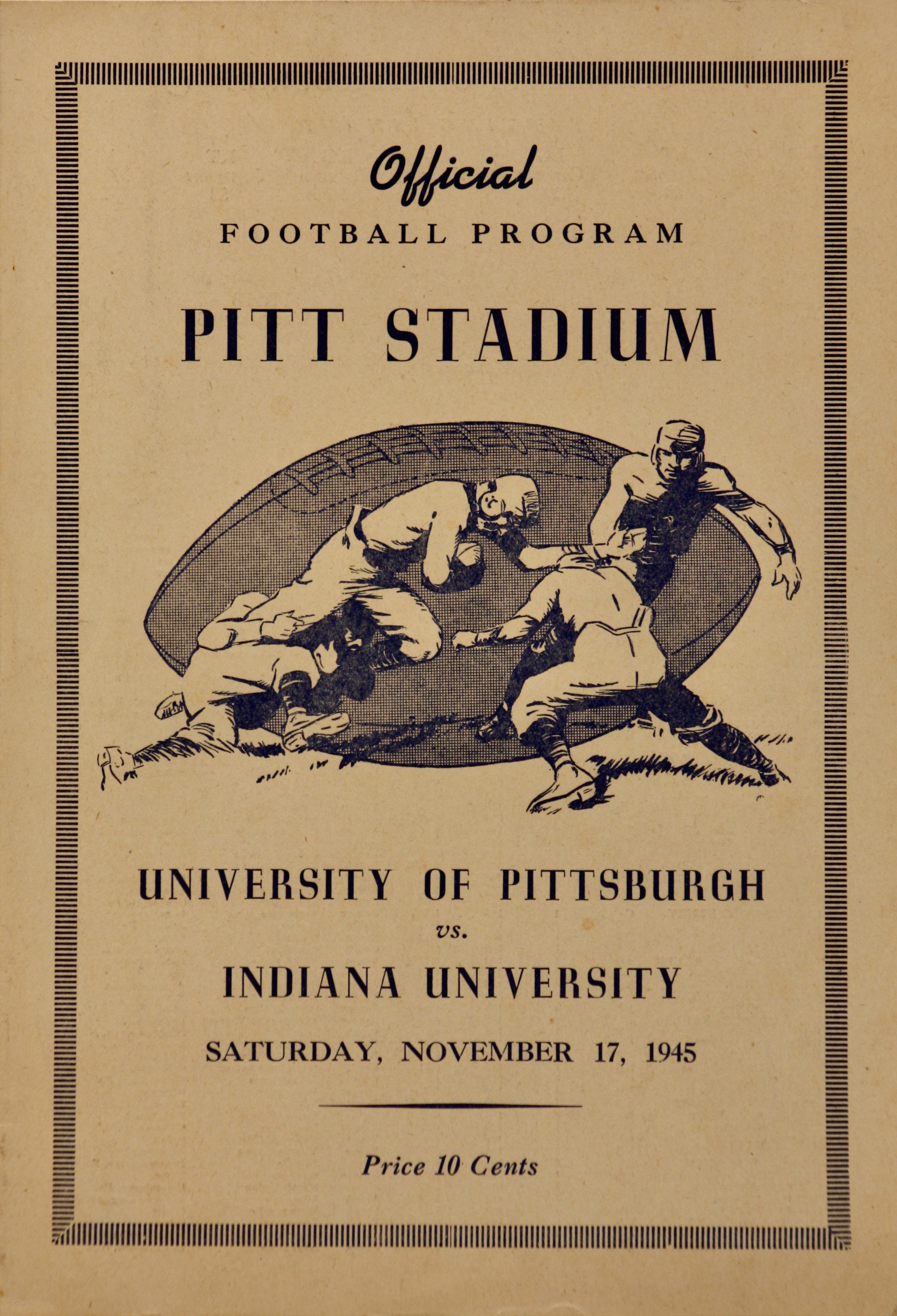
Program for November 17 game vesus Indiana

On November 17, the Panthers met their final Western Conference opponent, the unbeaten Indiana Hoosiers. Bo McMillin's squad was 7–0–1 and ranked #4 in the AP poll. Five of their starters received All-American honors – fullback Pete Pihos, tackle Russ Deal, guard Howard Brown, end Bob Ravensberg, and halfback George Taliaferro.

Coach Shaughnessy started a different backfield to generate more offense - William Wolff at quarterback, James Foley and Edmund Ralko at halfback and James Robinson at fullback.

In front of 5,000 rain-soaked fans, the Panthers were shutout for the fourth straight game. Indiana scored three touchdowns and beat the Panthers 19–0. The Hoosiers scored in the opening period on a 2-yard touchdown pass from Ben Raimondi to Bob Ravensberg. Charley Armstrong missed the extra point. Neither team threatened to score for the remainder of the first half. In the third quarter, Indiana tackle John Goldsberry blocked Leo Skladaney's punt and Ted Kluszewski recovered on the Pitt 5-yard line. Pete Pihos scored on second down. Armstrong missed the point after. After a Panther punt, the Indiana offense drove 69-yards in 7 plays. Pete Pihos scored from the one and Armstrong added the point after to close the scoring. Indiana won the Western Conference title with a 9–0–1 record and were ranked #4 in the AP final poll.

The Pitt starting lineup for the game against Indiana was Leo Skladany (left end), Daniel Cerrone (left tackle), Anthony Chuffi (left guard), John Kosh (center), George Ranii (right guard), George Johnson (right tackle), William McPeak (right end), William Wolff (quarterback), James Foley (left halfback), Edmund Ralko (right halfback) and James Robinson (fullback). Substitutes appearing in the game for Pitt were William Mihm, Michael Banasick, Albert Zellman, Denver Newman, John Rozanski, Michael Roussos, Joseph DeFrank, Steve Polach, Edward Smith, Henry Clougherty, Jack Smodic, Harold Wertman, Edward Zimmovan and Michael Temenoff.

Scoring summary

Quarter	Time	Drive			Team	Scoring information	Score	
Quarter	Time	Plays	Yards	TOP	Team	Scoring information	Indiana	Pittsburgh
1		11	41		Indiana	Bob Ravensberg 2-yard touchdown reception from Ben Raimondi, Charley Armstrong kick no good	6	0
3		2	5		Indiana	Pete Pihos 2-yard touchdown run, Charley Armstrong kick no good	12	0
3		7	69		Indiana	Pete Pihos 1-yard touchdown run, Charley Armstrong kick good	19	0
"TOP" = time of possession. For other American football terms, see Glossary of American football.							19	0

=== Penn State ===
Week 10: Penn State at Pitt

Team	1	2	3	4	Total
Penn State	0	0	0	0	0
• Pitt	7	0	0	0	7

- Date: November 24, 1945
- Location: Pitt Stadium
  Pittsburgh, PA
- Game start: 2:00 p.m.
- Game attendance: 11,354
- Game weather: snow flurries
- Referee: William T. Halloran

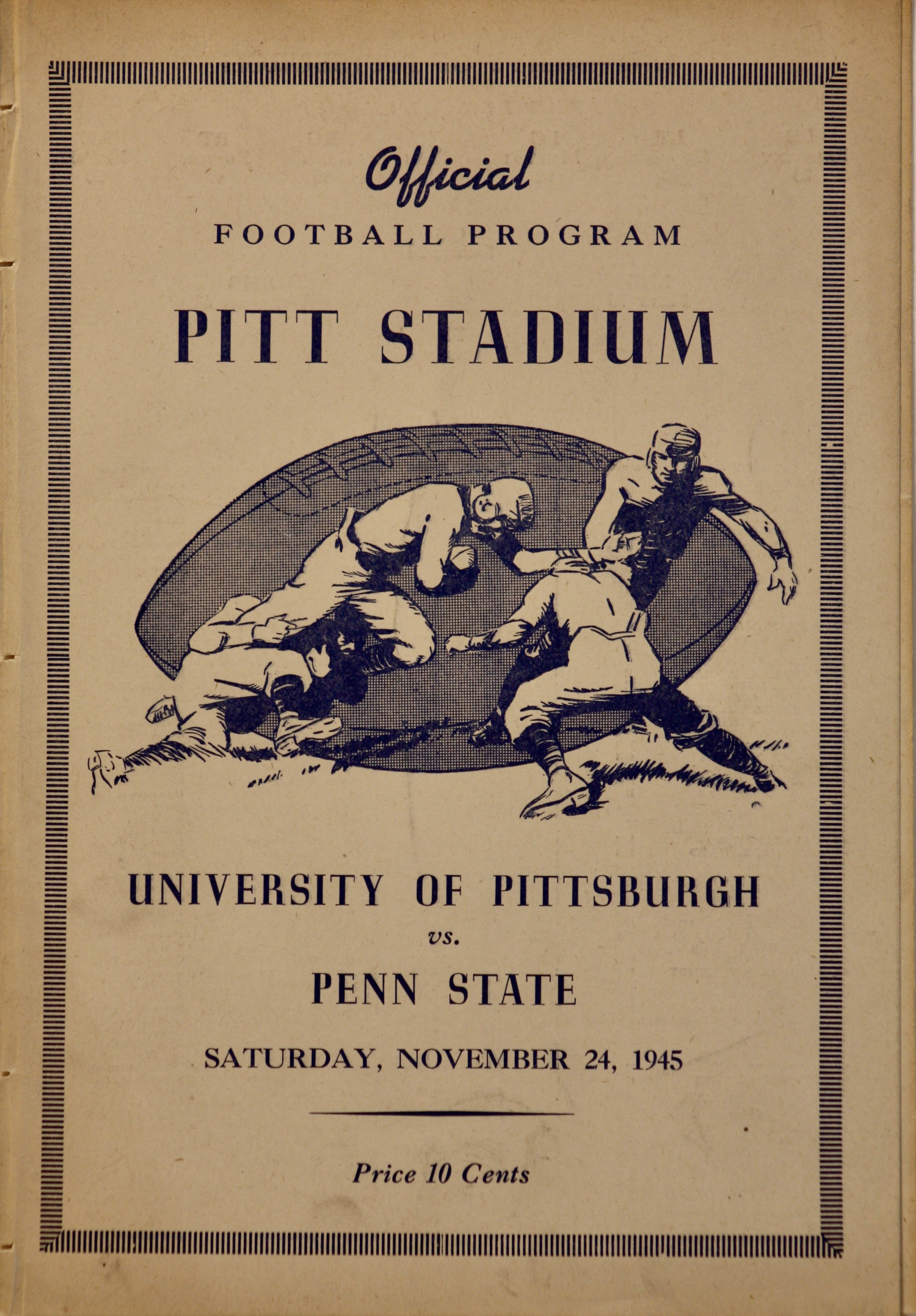
Program for November 24 game versus Penn State

On November 24, the Panthers ended the season against in-state rival Penn State. Pitt led the series 25–17–2. The Nittany Lions were 5–2, having just lost to common opponent Michigan State 33–0. Coach Higgins named fullback Ralph Ventresco, an infantry veteran, captain for the game. State starting halfback Joe Tepsic who missed the Michigan State game due to injury was in the lineup.

On the Monday prior to the game, at the weekly press conference luncheon, Coach Shaughnessy announced that the team would wear Blue and Gold uniforms for the Penn State game. "We've blamed our losses on everything else," the Pitt coach explained. "Now we're going to blame it on the uniforms and bring back the school colors...The red and white was just a wartime uniform for a wartime team. Now that the war is over, we're going back to normal and the traditional blue and gold." Pitt guard Francis Mattioli returned to the lineup and was named co-captain along with guard George Ranii. Center John Kosh was injured and replaced by Henry Clougherty.

Pitt freshman running back Jimmy Joe Robinson fielded a first quarter quick-kick on the Panthers 10-yard line, and ran 90 yards for the only touchdown of the game. Harry Keck of the Sun-Telegraph wrote: "He cut to the left sideline, picked up interference that brushed aside defenders and finally broke into the clear and with his speed could not be caught. Mike Roussos booted the extra point and that was the ball game." The Pitt defense stopped Penn State drives twice in the opening quarter. First, Panthers halfback Ed Zimmovan intercepted a Lion pass on the 1-yard line, and after Pitt kicked out of trouble, the Lions advanced to the Panthers 18-yard line before losing the ball on downs. In the final quarter, the Lions offense penetrated to the Pitt 15-yard line, but the Pitt defense again took over on downs and their offense ran out the clock. State made 12 first downs to Pitt's 7, but Pitt rushed for 131 yards to 103 for State. State gained 67 yards on 4 pass completions. The Panthers did not complete a pass (0–3).

The Pitt starting lineup for the game against Penn State was Leo Skladany (left end), Daniel Cerrone (left tackle), Francis Mattioli (left guard), Henry Clougherty (center), George Ranii (right guard), Michael Roussos (right tackle), William McPeak (right end), Jack Smodic (quarterback), James Robinson (left halfback), Edward Zimmovan (right halfback) and James Foley (fullback). Substitutes appearing in the game for Pitt were John Rozanski, George Johnson, Anthony Chuffi, Harold Wertman, Donald Matthews, Michael Temenoff and Vincent Manauzzi.

Scoring summary

Quarter	Time	Drive			Team	Scoring information	Score	
Quarter	Time	Plays	Yards	TOP	Team	Scoring information	Penn State	Pittsburgh
1		1	90		Pittsburgh	Punt returned 90 yards for touchdown by James Robinson, Mike Roussos kick good	0	7
"TOP" = time of possession. For other American football terms, see Glossary of American football.							0	7

== Individual scoring summary ==
1945 Pittsburgh Panthers scoring summary
Player	Touchdowns	Extra points	Field goals	Safety	Points
Michael Roussos	4	6	0	0	30
James Robinson	4	0	0	0	24
Herbert Douglas	2	0	0	0	12
Ed Zimmovan	1	0	0	0	6
James Foley	1	0	0	0	6
George Linelli	1	0	0	0	6
William McPeak	0	0	0	1	2
Francis Mattioli	0	1	0	0	1
Totals	13	7	0	1	87

=== Postseason ===
George Ranii, Francis Mattioli and John Kosh were invited to participate in the North-South game in Montgomery, AL on New Year's Day.

Leo Skladany started at end for the east in the New Year's Day Shrine Game in San Francisco.

== Team players drafted into the NFL ==
The following players were selected in the 1946 NFL draft.

Player	Position	Round	Pick	NFL club
George Johnson	Tackle	22	203	Pittsburgh Steelers
Jack Itzel	Fullback	31	292	Philadelphia Eagles
