= Grant Heckenlively =

American football player and coach (1916–1985)

Biographical details
- Born: August 29, 1916
- Died: October 12, 1985 (aged 69)

Playing career
- 1940: South Dakota
- Position: Center

Coaching career (HC unless noted)
- 1945: South Dakota

Head coaching record
- Overall: 0–4

Accomplishments and honors

Awards
- First-team All-NCC (1940)

Grant Elmer Heckenlively (August 29, 1916 – October 12, 1985) was an American football player and coach. He served as the head football coach at his alma mater, the University of South Dakota, in 1945, compiling a record of 0–4.

== Head coaching record ==
Year	Team	Overall	Conference	Standing	Bowl/playoffs
South Dakota Coyotes (North Central Conference) (1945)
1945	South Dakota	0–4	NA	NA	
South Dakota:		0–4			
Total:		0–4			
