= 1945 Miami Redskins football team =

American college football season

1945 Miami Redskins football
- Conference: Independent
- Record: 7–2
- Head coach: Sid Gillman (2nd season)
- Captain: Paul Dietzel
- Home stadium: Miami Field

1945 Midwestern college football independents records
	Conf.			Overall
Team	W	L	T	W		L		T
Michigan State Normal		–		5	–	0	–	1
Central Michigan		–		6	–	1	–	0
Miami (OH)		–		7	–	2	–	0
No. 9 Notre Dame		–		7	–	2	–	1
Detroit		–		6	–	3	–	0
Great Lakes Navy		–		6	–	4	–	1
Michigan State		–		5	–	3	–	1
Marquette		–		5	–	4	–	1
Bowling Green		–		4	–	3	–	0
Western Michigan		–		4	–	3	–	0
Cincinnati		–		4	–	4	–	0
Ohio		–		3	–	4	–	0
Ohio Wesleyan		–		3	–	4	–	0
Carthage		–		2	–	3	–	0
Wayne		–		2	–	5	–	1
Rankings from AP Poll

The 1945 Miami Redskins football team was an American football team that represented Miami University as an independent during the 1945 college football season. In its second season under head coach Sid Gillman, Miami compiled a 7–2 record and outscored all opponents by a combined total of 220 to 72. Paul Dietzel, who later served as the head football coach at LSU, Army, and South Carolina, was the team captain.

== Schedule ==
Date	Opponent	Site	Result	Attendance	Source
September 22	Bowling Green	Miami Field; Oxford, OH	W 26–0		
September 29	Notre Dame "B"	Miami Field; Oxford, OH	W 13–0		
October 6	vs. Wright Field	University of Dayton Stadium; Dayton, OH	W 14–0		
October 13	at Western Michigan	Waldo Stadium; Kalamazoo, MI	W 21–13		
October 20	Ohio^{†}	Miami Field; Oxford, OH (rivalry)	W 34–0	9,000	
October 26	at Miami (FL)	Burdine Stadium; Miami, FL	L 13–27	20,564	
November 3	Indiana State Teachers	Miami Field; Oxford, OH	W 51–0		
November 10	at No. 12 Purdue	Ross–Ade Stadium; West Lafayette, IN	L 7–21	12,000	
November 22	at Cincinnati	Nippert Stadium; Cincinnati, OH (rivalry)	W 28–14	12,000	
^{†}Homecoming; Rankings from Coaches' Poll released prior to the game
