= 1945 Cincinnati Bearcats football team =

American college football season

1945 Cincinnati Bearcats football
- Conference: Independent
- Record: 4–4
- Head coach: Ray Nolting (1st season)
- Home stadium: Nippert Stadium

1945 Midwestern college football independents records
	Conf.			Overall
Team	W	L	T	W		L		T
Michigan State Normal		–		5	–	0	–	1
Central Michigan		–		6	–	1	–	0
Miami (OH)		–		7	–	2	–	0
No. 9 Notre Dame		–		7	–	2	–	1
Detroit		–		6	–	3	–	0
Great Lakes Navy		–		6	–	4	–	1
Michigan State		–		5	–	3	–	1
Marquette		–		5	–	4	–	1
Bowling Green		–		4	–	3	–	0
Western Michigan		–		4	–	3	–	0
Cincinnati		–		4	–	4	–	0
Ohio		–		3	–	4	–	0
Ohio Wesleyan		–		3	–	4	–	0
Carthage		–		2	–	3	–	0
Wayne		–		2	–	5	–	1
Rankings from AP Poll

The 1945 Cincinnati Bearcats football team was an American football team that represented the University of Cincinnati as an independent during the 1945 college football season. The Bearcats were led by first-year head coach Ray Nolting and compiled a 4–4 record.

== Schedule ==
Date	Opponent	Site	Result	Attendance	Source
September 22	Denison	Nippert Stadium; Cincinnati, OH	W 30–0		
September 29	at Kentucky	McLean Stadium; Lexington, KY	L 7–13	11,000	
October 6	DePauw	Nippert Stadium; Cincinnati, OH	W 7–0		
October 13	Ohio	Peden Stadium; Athens, OH	L 19–20	6,000	
October 27	Kentucky	Nippert Stadium; Cincinnati, OH	W 16–7	21,000	
November 3	Baldwin–Wallace	Nippert Stadium; Cincinnati, OH	W 39–0	8,000	
November 10	at Detroit	University of Detroit Stadium; Detroit, MI	L 0–20	10,159	
November 22	Miami (OH)	Nippert Stadium; Cincinnati, OH (Victory Bell)	L 14–28	12,000	
