= 1945 Detroit Titans football team =

American college football season

1945 Detroit Titans football
- Conference: Independent
- Record: 6–3
- Head coach: Chuck Baer (1st season)
- Captain: Game captains
- Home stadium: University of Detroit Stadium

1945 Midwestern college football independents records
	Conf.			Overall
Team	W	L	T	W		L		T
Michigan State Normal		–		5	–	0	–	1
Central Michigan		–		6	–	1	–	0
Miami (OH)		–		7	–	2	–	0
No. 9 Notre Dame		–		7	–	2	–	1
Detroit		–		6	–	3	–	0
Great Lakes Navy		–		6	–	4	–	1
Michigan State		–		5	–	3	–	1
Marquette		–		5	–	4	–	1
Bowling Green		–		4	–	3	–	0
Western Michigan		–		4	–	3	–	0
Cincinnati		–		4	–	4	–	0
Ohio		–		3	–	4	–	0
Ohio Wesleyan		–		3	–	4	–	0
Carthage		–		2	–	3	–	0
Wayne		–		2	–	5	–	1
Rankings from AP Poll

The 1945 Detroit Titans football team represented the University of Detroit as an independent during the 1945 college football season. In their first season under head coach Chuck Baer, the Titans compiled a 6–3 record and outscored their opponents by a combined total of 193 to 114.

The team's coaching staff consisted of Chuck Baer (head coach and line coach), Edmund Barbour (backfield coach), Lloyd Brazil (end coach, assistant backfield coach, and athletic director), and Dr. Raymond Forsyth (trainer). The team had game captains rather than selecting one or two players as the team captain or captains for the full season.

== Schedule ==
Date	Opponent	Site	Result	Attendance	Source
September 28	Alma	University of Detroit Stadium; Detroit, MI	W 32–0	4,500	
October 5	Scranton	University of Detroit Stadium; Detroit, MI	W 42–0	12,500	
October 13	vs. No. 20 Mississippi State	Crump Stadium; Memphis, TN	L 6–41	12,000	
October 21	at Villanova	Shibe Park; Philadelphia, PA	L 0–14	11,000	
October 26	Drake	University of Detroit Stadium; Detroit, MI	W 19–14	10,352	
November 3	at Marquette	Marquette Stadium; Milwaukee, WI	L 14–32	9,000	
November 10	Cincinnati	University of Detroit Stadium; Detroit, MI	W 20–0	10,159	
November 18	Saint Louis	University of Detroit Stadium; Detroit, MI	W 27–0	10,671	
November 22	Wayne	University of Detroit Stadium; Detroit, MI	W 33–13	8,622	
Rankings from AP Poll released prior to the game

== See also ==
- 1945 in Michigan
