= 1945 Notre Dame Fighting Irish football team =

American college football season

1945 Notre Dame Fighting Irish football
- Conference: Independent

Ranking
- AP: No. 9
- Record: 7–2–1
- Head coach: Hugh Devore (1st season)
- Captain: Frank Dancewicz
- Home stadium: Notre Dame Stadium

1945 Midwestern college football independents records
| | Conf. | | | Overall |
| Team | W | L | T | W | | L | | T |
|---|---|---|---|---|---|---|---|---|
| Michigan State Normal | | – | | 5 | – | 0 | – | 1 |
| Central Michigan | | – | | 6 | – | 1 | – | 0 |
| Miami (OH) | | – | | 7 | – | 2 | – | 0 |
| No. 9 Notre Dame | | – | | 7 | – | 2 | – | 1 |
| Detroit | | – | | 6 | – | 3 | – | 0 |
| Great Lakes Navy | | – | | 6 | – | 4 | – | 1 |
| Michigan State | | – | | 5 | – | 3 | – | 1 |
| Marquette | | – | | 5 | – | 4 | – | 1 |
| Bowling Green | | – | | 4 | – | 3 | – | 0 |
| Western Michigan | | – | | 4 | – | 3 | – | 0 |
| Cincinnati | | – | | 4 | – | 4 | – | 0 |
| Ohio | | – | | 3 | – | 4 | – | 0 |
| Ohio Wesleyan | | – | | 3 | – | 4 | – | 0 |
| Carthage | | – | | 2 | – | 3 | – | 0 |
| Wayne | | – | | 2 | – | 5 | – | 1 |
Rankings from AP Poll

The 1945 Notre Dame Fighting Irish football team was an American football team that represented the University of Notre Dame as an independent during the 1945 college football season. In their first and only year under head coach Hugh Devore, the Irish compiled a 7–2–1 record, outscored opponents by a total of 255 to 122, and were ranked No. 9 in the final AP poll. The team won its first five games and was ranked No 2 before tying No. 3 Navy and losing to No. 1 Army in consecutive weeks. They also lost the final game of the season to Great Lakes Navy.

Quarterback and team captain Frank Dancewicz received first-team honors from the Central Press on the 1945 All-America college football team. Guard John Mastrangelo received first-team All-America honors from the International News Service.

The team played its home games at Notre Dame Stadium in Notre Dame, Indiana.

== Schedule ==
| Date | Opponent | Rank | Site | Result | Attendance | Source |
|---|---|---|---|---|---|---|
| September 29 | Illinois | | Notre Dame Stadium; Notre Dame, IN | W 7–0 | 41,569 | |
| October 6 | at Georgia Tech | | Grant Field; Atlanta, GA (rivalry) | W 40–7 | 30,157 | |
| October 13 | Dartmouth | No. 3 | Notre Dame Stadium; Notre Dame, IN | W 34–0 | 34,645 | |
| October 20 | at Pittsburgh | No. 3 | Pitt Stadium; Pittsburgh, PA (rivalry) | W 39–9 | 57,542 | |
| October 27 | Iowa | No. 2 | Notre Dame Stadium; Notre Dame, IN | W 56–0 | 42,841 | |
| November 3 | vs. No. 3 Navy | No. 2 | Municipal Stadium; Cleveland, OH (rivalry) | T 6–6 | 82,020 | |
| November 10 | vs. No. 1 Army | No. 2 | Yankee Stadium; Bronx, NY (rivalry) | L 0–48 | 74,621 | |
| November 17 | at Northwestern | No. 7 | Dyche Stadium; Evanston, IL (rivalry) | W 12–7 | 46,294 | |
| November 24 | at Tulane | No. 5 | Tulane Stadium; New Orleans, LA | W 32–6 | 63,000 | |
| December 1 | at Great Lakes Navy | No. 5 | Ross Field; North Chicago, IL | L 7–39 | 23,000 | |
Rankings from AP Poll released prior to the game

== Rankings ==
Ranking movements Legend: ██ Increase in ranking ██ Decrease in ranking ( ) = First-place votes
| | Week | | | | | | | | |
| Poll | 1 | 2 | 3 | 4 | 5 | 6 | 7 | 8 | Final |
|---|---|---|---|---|---|---|---|---|---|
| AP | 3 (3) | 3 | 2 (4) | 2 (6) | 2 (3) | 7 | 5 | 5 | 9 |
