= 1945 Michigan State Normal Hurons football team =

American college football season

1945 Michigan State Normal Hurons football
- Conference: Independent
- Record: 5–0–1
- Head coach: Elton Rynearson (23rd season)
- Captain: Bernard T. Dyer
- Home stadium: Briggs Field

1945 Midwestern college football independents records
	Conf.			Overall
Team	W	L	T	W		L		T
Michigan State Normal		–		5	–	0	–	1
Central Michigan		–		6	–	1	–	0
Miami (OH)		–		7	–	2	–	0
No. 9 Notre Dame		–		7	–	2	–	1
Detroit		–		6	–	3	–	0
Great Lakes Navy		–		6	–	4	–	1
Michigan State		–		5	–	3	–	1
Marquette		–		5	–	4	–	1
Bowling Green		–		4	–	3	–	0
Western Michigan		–		4	–	3	–	0
Cincinnati		–		4	–	4	–	0
Ohio		–		3	–	4	–	0
Ohio Wesleyan		–		3	–	4	–	0
Carthage		–		2	–	3	–	0
Wayne		–		2	–	5	–	1
Rankings from AP Poll

The 1945 Michigan State Normal Hurons football team represented Michigan State Normal College (later renamed Eastern Michigan University) as an independent during the 1945 college football season. In their 23rd season under head coach Elton Rynearson, the Hurons compiled an undefeated record of 5–0–1, shut out five of six opponents, including a scoreless tie with Wayne State, defeated Wayne State, 14-13, in a second game, and outscored all opponents by a combined score of 45 to 13. Bernard T. Dyer was the team captain. The team played its home games at Briggs Field on the school's campus in Ypsilanti, Michigan.

== Schedule ==
Date	Opponent	Site	Result
October 6	Albion	Briggs Field; Ypsilanti, MI	W 6–0
October 13	Hillsdale ^{†}	Briggs Field; Ypsilanti, MI	W 13–0
October 27	at Hillsdale	Hillsdale, MI	W 6–0
November 3	at Albion	Albion, MI	W 6–0
November 9	at Wayne	Detroit	W 14–13
November 16	Wayne	Briggs Field; Ypsilanti, MI	T 0–0
^{†}Homecoming
