= 1945 Ohio Bobcats football team =

American college football season

1945 Ohio Bobcats football
- Conference: Independent
- Record: 3–4
- Head coach: Don Peden (20th season)
- Home stadium: Peden Stadium

1945 Midwestern college football independents records
| | Conf. | | | Overall |
| Team | W | L | T | W | | L | | T |
|---|---|---|---|---|---|---|---|---|
| Michigan State Normal | | – | | 5 | – | 0 | – | 1 |
| Central Michigan | | – | | 6 | – | 1 | – | 0 |
| Miami (OH) | | – | | 7 | – | 2 | – | 0 |
| No. 9 Notre Dame | | – | | 7 | – | 2 | – | 1 |
| Detroit | | – | | 6 | – | 3 | – | 0 |
| Great Lakes Navy | | – | | 6 | – | 4 | – | 1 |
| Michigan State | | – | | 5 | – | 3 | – | 1 |
| Marquette | | – | | 5 | – | 4 | – | 1 |
| Bowling Green | | – | | 4 | – | 3 | – | 0 |
| Western Michigan | | – | | 4 | – | 3 | – | 0 |
| Cincinnati | | – | | 4 | – | 4 | – | 0 |
| Ohio | | – | | 3 | – | 4 | – | 0 |
| Ohio Wesleyan | | – | | 3 | – | 4 | – | 0 |
| Carthage | | – | | 2 | – | 3 | – | 0 |
| Wayne | | – | | 2 | – | 5 | – | 1 |
Rankings from AP Poll

The 1945 Ohio Bobcats football team was an American football team that represented Ohio University during the 1945 college football season. In 20th their penultimate season under head coach Don Peden, the Bobcats compiled a 3–4 record and were outscored by all opponents by a combined total of 106 to 100.

== Schedule ==
| Date | Opponent | Site | Result | Attendance | Source |
|---|---|---|---|---|---|
| September 29 | Bowling Green | Peden Stadium; Athens, OH | L 0–6 | | |
| October 6 | Western Michigan | Peden Stadium; Athens, OH | L 20–21 | | |
| October 13 | Cincinnati | Peden Stadium; Athens, OH | W 20–19 | 6,000 | |
| October 20 | at Miami (OH) | Miami Field; Oxford, OH (rivalry) | L 0–34 | 9,000 | |
| November 10 | at Baldwin–Wallace | Berea, OH | W 33–7 | 5,000 | |
| November 17 | at West Virginia | Mountaineer Field; Morgantown, WV | W 14–0 | 6,000 | |
