= 1945 Bowling Green Falcons football team =

American college football season

1945 Bowling Green Falcons football
- Conference: Independent
- Record: 4–3
- Head coach: Robert Whittaker (5th season)
- Captain: Patrick Mulvihill
- Home stadium: University Stadium

1945 Midwestern college football independents records
	Conf.			Overall
Team	W	L	T	W		L		T
Michigan State Normal		–		5	–	0	–	1
Central Michigan		–		6	–	1	–	0
Miami (OH)		–		7	–	2	–	0
No. 9 Notre Dame		–		7	–	2	–	1
Detroit		–		6	–	3	–	0
Great Lakes Navy		–		6	–	4	–	1
Michigan State		–		5	–	3	–	1
Marquette		–		5	–	4	–	1
Bowling Green		–		4	–	3	–	0
Western Michigan		–		4	–	3	–	0
Cincinnati		–		4	–	4	–	0
Ohio		–		3	–	4	–	0
Ohio Wesleyan		–		3	–	4	–	0
Carthage		–		2	–	3	–	0
Wayne		–		2	–	5	–	1
Rankings from AP Poll

The 1945 Bowling Green Falcons football team was an American football team that represented Bowling Green State College (later renamed Bowling Green State University) as an independent during the 1945 college football season. In its fifth season under head coach Robert Whittaker, the team compiled a 4–3 record and was outscored by a total of 81 to 79. Patrick Mulvihill was the team captain. The team played its home games at University Stadium in Bowling Green, Ohio.

== Schedule ==
Date	Opponent	Site	Result	Source
August 31	at Alma	Alma, MI	W 15–0	
September 7	Central Michigan	University Stadium; Bowling Green, OH	W 19–6	
September 14	at Baldwin–Wallace	Berea, OH	L 13–14	
September 22	at Miami (OH)	Miami Field; Oxford, OH	L 0–26	
September 29	at Ohio	Peden Stadium; Athens, OH	W 6–0	
October 6	at Oberlin	Oberlin Stadium; Oberlin, OH	L 0–28	
October 13	Case	University Stadium; Bowling Green, OH	W 26–7	
