= 1945 Michigan State Spartans football team =

American college football season

1945 Michigan State Spartans football
- Conference: Independent
- Record: 5–3–1
- Head coach: Charlie Bachman (12th season)
- Offensive scheme: Notre Dame Box
- MVP: Steve Contos
- Captain: Jack Breslin
- Home stadium: Macklin Field

1945 Midwestern college football independents records
	Conf.			Overall
Team	W	L	T	W		L		T
Michigan State Normal		–		5	–	0	–	1
Central Michigan		–		6	–	1	–	0
Miami (OH)		–		7	–	2	–	0
No. 9 Notre Dame		–		7	–	2	–	1
Detroit		–		6	–	3	–	0
Great Lakes Navy		–		6	–	4	–	1
Michigan State		–		5	–	3	–	1
Marquette		–		5	–	4	–	1
Bowling Green		–		4	–	3	–	0
Western Michigan		–		4	–	3	–	0
Cincinnati		–		4	–	4	–	0
Ohio		–		3	–	4	–	0
Ohio Wesleyan		–		3	–	4	–	0
Carthage		–		2	–	3	–	0
Wayne		–		2	–	5	–	1
Rankings from AP Poll

The 1945 Michigan State Spartans football team represented Michigan State College as an independent during the 1945 college football season. In their 12th season under head coach Charlie Bachman, the Spartans compiled a 5–3–1 record. The Spartans lost their annual rivalry game with Michigan by a 40 to 0 score. In intersectional play, the Spartans beat Kentucky (7–6), Pittsburgh (12–7), and Penn State (33–0), but lost to the Miami Hurricanes (21-7).

== Schedule ==
Date	Opponent	Site	Result	Attendance	Source
September 29	at Michigan	Michigan Stadium; Ann Arbor, MI (rivalry)	L 0–40	26,076	
October 6	Kentucky	Macklin Field; East Lansing, MI	W 7–6	9,300	
October 13	at Pittsburgh	Pitt Stadium; Pittsburgh, PA	W 12–7		
October 20	Wayne	Macklin Field; East Lansing, MI	W 27–7		
October 27	Marquette	Macklin Field; East Lansing, MI	T 13–13	12,000	
November 3	Missouri^{†}	Macklin Field; East Lansing, MI	W 14–7		
November 10	Great Lakes Navy	Macklin Field; East Lansing, MI	L 7–27		
November 17	No. 12 Penn State	Macklin Field; East Lansing, MI (rivalry)	W 33–0		
November 23	at Miami (FL)	Burdine Stadium; Miami, FL	L 7–21	21,327	
^{†}Homecoming; Rankings from AP Poll released prior to the game

== Game summaries ==
=== Michigan ===
Week 3: Michigan State at Michigan

Team	1	2	3	4	Total
Michigan State	0	0	0	0	0
• Michigan	7	13	7	13	40

- Date: September 29, 1945
- Location: Michigan Stadium
  Ann Arbor, MI
- Game attendance: 35,200
- Referee: Mike Layden (Notre Dame)

On September 29, 1945, Michigan State lost to Michigan by a 40 to 0 score. Michigan's six touchdowns were scored by Dan Dworsky (one-yard run in first quarter), Donovan Hershberger (touchdown pass from Joe Ponsetto), Bob Nussbaumer (three-yard run in second quarter), Wally Teninga (three-yard run in third quarter and another touchdown run in the fourth quarter), and Wesley Muelder (10-yard interception return for touchdown). Ponsetto kicked four points after touchdown and completed three of four passes for 89 yards, including the touchdown throw to Hershberger. Michigan gained 274 rushing yards and 128 yards passing, outpacing the Spartans who were limited to 37 rushing yards and 48 passing yards. Michigan's rushing leaders were Dworsky (16 carries for 64 yards) and Nussbaumer (8 carries for 60 yards).
