= 1945 Central Michigan Chippewas football team =

American college football season

1945 Central Michigan Chippewas football
- Conference: Independent
- Record: 6–1
- Head coach: Ron Finch (9th season)
- Home stadium: Alumni Field

1945 Midwestern college football independents records
	Conf.			Overall
Team	W	L	T	W		L		T
Michigan State Normal		–		5	–	0	–	1
Central Michigan		–		6	–	1	–	0
Miami (OH)		–		7	–	2	–	0
No. 9 Notre Dame		–		7	–	2	–	1
Detroit		–		6	–	3	–	0
Great Lakes Navy		–		6	–	4	–	1
Michigan State		–		5	–	3	–	1
Marquette		–		5	–	4	–	1
Bowling Green		–		4	–	3	–	0
Western Michigan		–		4	–	3	–	0
Cincinnati		–		4	–	4	–	0
Ohio		–		3	–	4	–	0
Ohio Wesleyan		–		3	–	4	–	0
Carthage		–		2	–	3	–	0
Wayne		–		2	–	5	–	1
Rankings from AP Poll

The 1945 Central Michigan Chippewas football team represented Central Michigan College of Education, later renamed Central Michigan University, as an independent during the 1945 college football season. In their ninth season under head coach Ron Finch, the Chippewas compiled a 6–1 record, shut out five of seven opponents, allowed an average of fewer than four points per game, and outscored all opponents by a combined total of 98 to 26. The team's sole loss was to Bowling Green (6-19), allowing only seven points in the six wins.

== Schedule ==
Date	Opponent	Site	Result	Attendance	Source
August 24	Alma	Alumni Field; Mount Pleasant, MI	W 13–0		
September 7	at Bowling Green	University Stadium; Bowling Green, OH	L 6–19		
September 14	at Alma	Alma, MI	W 26–0		
September 29	Western Michigan	Alumni Field; Mount Pleasant, MI (rivalry)	W 6–0		
October 5	Eastern Kentucky	Alumni Field; Mount Pleasant, MI	W 14–7		
October 13	at Wayne	University of Detroit Stadium; Detroit, MI	W 26–0	1,000	
October 20	Albion	Alumni Field; Mount Pleasant, MI	W 7–0		
