= 1945 Western Michigan Broncos football team =

American college football season

1945 Western Michigan Broncos football
- Conference: Independent
- Record: 4–3
- Head coach: John Gill (4th season)
- MVP: Ned Stuits
- Captain: None
- Home stadium: Waldo Stadium

1945 Midwestern college football independents records
	Conf.			Overall
Team	W	L	T	W		L		T
Michigan State Normal		–		5	–	0	–	1
Central Michigan		–		6	–	1	–	0
Miami (OH)		–		7	–	2	–	0
No. 9 Notre Dame		–		7	–	2	–	1
Detroit		–		6	–	3	–	0
Great Lakes Navy		–		6	–	4	–	1
Michigan State		–		5	–	3	–	1
Marquette		–		5	–	4	–	1
Bowling Green		–		4	–	3	–	0
Western Michigan		–		4	–	3	–	0
Cincinnati		–		4	–	4	–	0
Ohio		–		3	–	4	–	0
Ohio Wesleyan		–		3	–	4	–	0
Carthage		–		2	–	3	–	0
Wayne		–		2	–	5	–	1
Rankings from AP Poll

The 1945 Western Michigan Broncos football team represented Michigan College of Education (later renamed Western Michigan University) as an independent during the 1945 college football season. In their fourth season under head coach John Gill, the Broncos compiled a 4–3 record and outscored their opponents, 147 to 105. The team played its home games at Waldo Stadium in Kalamazoo, Michigan. Tackle Ned Stuits received the team's most outstanding player award.

== Schedule ==
Date	Opponent	Site	Result	Attendance	Source
September 22	Alma	Waldo Stadium; Kalamazoo, MI	W 21–13		
September 29	at Central Michigan	Alumni Field; Mount Pleasant, MI (rivalry)	L 0–6		
October 6	at Ohio	Peden Stadium; Athens, OH	W 21–20		
October 13	Miami (OH)	Waldo Stadium; Kalamazoo, MI	L 13–21		
October 27	Great Lakes Navy	Waldo Stadium; Kalamazoo, MI	L 0–39	10,000	
November 3	at Valparaiso	Valparaiso; Valparaiso, IN	W 26–13		
November 10	Wooster	Waldo Stadium; Kalamazoo, MI	W 66–0		
