= 1945 Marquette Hilltoppers football team =

American college football season

1945 Marquette Hilltoppers football
- Conference: Independent
- Record: 5–4–1
- Head coach: Thomas E. Stidham (5th season)
- Home stadium: Marquette Stadium

1945 Midwestern college football independents records
	Conf.			Overall
Team	W	L	T	W		L		T
Michigan State Normal		–		5	–	0	–	1
Central Michigan		–		6	–	1	–	0
Miami (OH)		–		7	–	2	–	0
No. 9 Notre Dame		–		7	–	2	–	1
Detroit		–		6	–	3	–	0
Great Lakes Navy		–		6	–	4	–	1
Michigan State		–		5	–	3	–	1
Marquette		–		5	–	4	–	1
Bowling Green		–		4	–	3	–	0
Western Michigan		–		4	–	3	–	0
Cincinnati		–		4	–	4	–	0
Ohio		–		3	–	4	–	0
Ohio Wesleyan		–		3	–	4	–	0
Carthage		–		2	–	3	–	0
Wayne		–		2	–	5	–	1
Rankings from AP Poll

The 1945 Marquette Hilltoppers football team was an American football team that represented Marquette University as an independent during the 1945 college football season. In its fifth season under head coach Tom Stidham, the team compiled a 5–4–1 record and outscored opponents by a total of 238 to 156. The team played its home games at Marquette Stadium in Milwaukee.

== Schedule ==
Date	Opponent	Site	Result	Attendance	Source
September 22	at Purdue	Ross–Ade Stadium; Lafayette, IN	L 13–14	11,000	
September 29	at Wisconsin	Camp Randall Stadium; Madison, WI	L 13–40	37,000	
October 7	vs. Villanova	Civic Stadium; Buffalo, NY	L 0–6	15,000	
October 13	Kansas State	Marquette Stadium; Milwaukee, WI	W 55–13	9,000	
October 20	Great Lakes Navy	Marquette Stadium; Milwaukee, WI	L 27–37	10,000	
October 27	at Michigan State	Macklin Field; East Lansing, MI	T 13–13	12,000	
November 3	Detroit	Marquette Stadium; Milwaukee, WI	W 32–14	9,000	
November 10	Kansas	Marquette Stadium; Milwaukee, WI	W 26–0	9,000	
November 17	at Kentucky	Stoll Field; Lexington, KY	W 19–13	8,000	
November 22	Saint Louis	Marquette Stadium; Milwaukee, WI	W 40–6	7,500	
