= List of NCAA college football rivalry games =

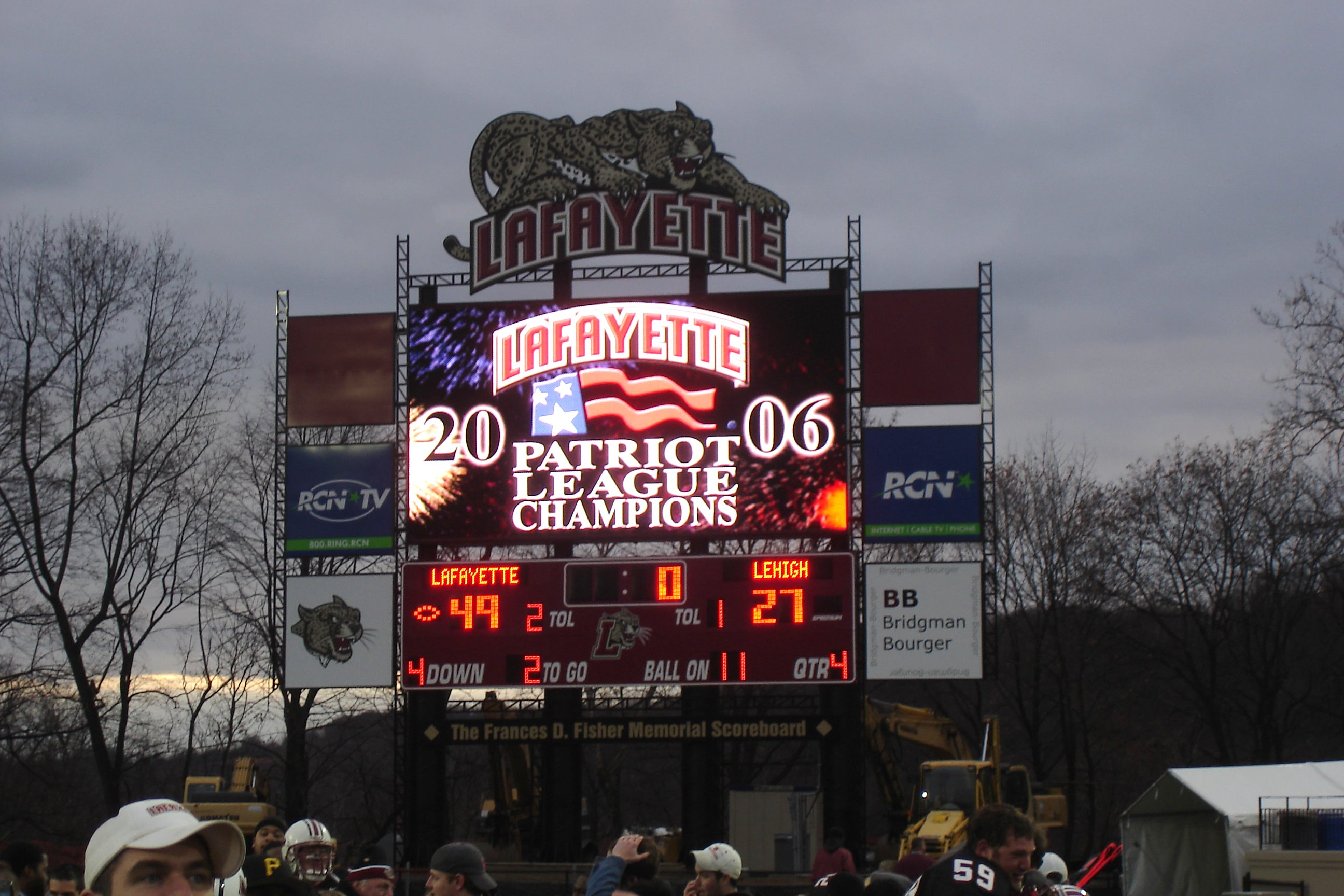
Fisher Stadium's scoreboard in Easton, Pennsylvania following Lafayette College's victory over Lehigh University in the 142nd edition of "The Rivalry" in 2006. The series between the two colleges, which are 17 miles (27 km) away from each other in the Lehigh Valley, is the most played rivalry in college football history with 158 meetings since 1884.

This is a list of rivalry games in college football. The list also shows any trophy awarded to the winner of the rivalry between the teams. (Note: The list only shows games that have an associated Wikipedia article for either the name of the game or the trophy. Other series have been played more times than games listed here that have no Wikipedia article. For example, in the FBS, Washington and Oregon State have played more than 100 times, and in the FCS, Harvard and Brown have played over 100 times.)

== NCAA Division I Football Bowl Subdivision ==
Game	Trophy	Team	Team	First Year	Latest Year	Meetings
100 Miles of Hate		Middle Tennessee	Western Kentucky	1914	2026	76
Air Force–Colorado State	Ram–Falcon Trophy	Air Force	Colorado State	1957	2025	63
Air Force–Hawaii	Kuter Trophy	Air Force	Hawaii	1966	2025	24
Akron–Kent State	Wagon Wheel	Akron	Kent State	1923	2026	69
Alabama–Clemson		Alabama	Clemson	1900	2019	19
Alabama–Florida		Alabama	Florida	1916	2021	42
Alabama–Georgia		Alabama	Georgia	1895	2026	77
Alabama–Georgia Tech		Alabama	Georgia Tech	1902	1984	52
Alabama–LSU		Alabama	LSU	1895	2026	91
Alabama–Ole Miss		Alabama	Ole Miss	1894	2023	71
Alabama–Penn State		Alabama	Penn State	1959	2011	15
Alabama–Vanderbilt		Alabama	Vanderbilt	1903	2026	88
Appalachian State–Coastal Carolina		Appalachian State	Coastal Carolina	2005	2026	13
Apple Cup	Apple Cup Trophy	Washington	Washington State	1900	2026	118
Arch Rivalry	Arch Rivalry Trophy	Illinois	Missouri	1896	2010	24
Arizona–New Mexico		Arizona	New Mexico	1908	2024	68
Arkansas–LSU	Golden Boot	Arkansas	LSU	1901	2025	71
Arkansas–Ole Miss		Arkansas	Ole Miss	1908	2025	72
Arkansas–Texas		Arkansas	Texas	1894	2026	82
Arkansas–Texas A&M	Southwest Classic Trophy	Arkansas	Texas A&M	1903	2026	83
Arkansas–Texas Tech		Arkansas	Texas Tech	1957	2024	38
Army–Navy Game		Army	Navy	1890	2025	126
Army–Notre Dame		Army	Notre Dame	1913	2024	52
Auburn–Clemson		Auburn	Clemson	1899	2017	51
Auburn–Florida		Auburn	Florida	1912	2026	85
Auburn–Georgia Tech		Auburn	Georgia Tech	1892	2005	92
Auburn–Ole Miss		Auburn	Ole Miss	1928	2026	49
Auburn–Tennessee		Auburn	Tennessee	1900	2026	55
Auburn–Tulane		Auburn	Tulane	1902	2019	38
Backyard Brawl		Pittsburgh	West Virginia	1895	2025	108
Ball State–Northern Illinois	Bronze Stalk Trophy	Ball State	Northern Illinois	1941	2025	53
Battle for Highway 82		Alabama	Mississippi State	1896	2026	109
Battle for Nevada	Fremont Cannon	Nevada	UNLV	1969	2025	51
Battle for the Bell	Victory Bell	Cincinnati	Miami (OH)	1888	2026	129
Battle for the Bell	The Bell	Marshall	Ohio	1905	2019	60
Battle for the Bell	The Bell	Southern Miss	Tulane	1979	2026	35
Battle for the Belt	The Belt	South Alabama	Troy	2012	2026	15
Battle for the Bones	The Bones	Memphis	UAB	1997	2026	19
Battle for the Iron Skillet	Iron Skillet	SMU	TCU	1915	2025	104
Battle for the Land Grant	Land Grant Trophy	Michigan State	Penn State	1914	2025	39
Battle for the Ol' School Bell	Ol' School Bell	Jacksonville State	Troy	1924	2025	64
Battle for the Palladium	The Palladium Trophy	Middle Tennessee	Troy	1936	2020	21
Battle for the Rag	Tiger Rag	LSU	Tulane	1893	2009	98
Battle for the Valley	Valley Trophy	Fresno State	San José State	1921	2026	89
Battle Line Rivalry	Battle Line Trophy	Arkansas	Missouri	1906	2026	18
Battle of I-10	Silver Spade	New Mexico State	UTEP	1914	2025	102
Battle of the Basins	Drill Bit	North Dakota State	Wyoming	2008	2026	2
Battle of the Blue Ridge		James Madison	Liberty	1980	2026	20
Battle of the Brazos		Baylor	Texas A&M	1899	2011	108
Battle of the Bricks		Miami (OH)	Ohio	1908	2026	103
Battle of the Brothers		Utah	Utah State	1892	2024	113
Battle of the Carolinas		North Carolina	South Carolina	1903	2023	60
Battle on the Bayou	Wooden Boot	Louisiana	Louisiana–Monroe	1951	2026	62
Baylor–Houston		Baylor	Houston	1950	2025	31
Baylor–Rice		Baylor	Rice	1914	2019	82
Baylor–Texas		Baylor	Texas	1901	2023	113
Baylor–Texas Tech		Baylor	Texas Tech	1929	2026	84
Bedlam Series	Bedlam Bell	Oklahoma	Oklahoma State	1904	2023	118
Big Game	The Axe	California	Stanford	1892	2026	129
Bill Walsh Legacy Game		San José State	Stanford	1900	2025	69
Black and Blue Bowl		Memphis	Southern Miss	1935	2012	63
Bluebonnet Battle	Bluebonnet Shield	Baylor	TCU	1899	2026	122
Boise State–Fresno State	Milk Can	Boise State	Fresno State	1977	2026	28
Boise State–Nevada		Boise State	Nevada	1971	2025	47
Border War	Bronze Boot	Colorado State	Wyoming	1899	2026	118
Border War	Indian War Drum; Lamar Hunt Trophy	Kansas	Missouri	1891	2026	122
Boston College–Clemson	O'Rourke–McFadden Trophy	Boston College	Clemson	1940	2025	33
Boston College–UMass		Boston College	UMass	1899	2021	28
Boston College–Virginia Tech		Boston College	Virginia Tech	1993	2026	34
Bowling Green–Kent State	Anniversary Award	Bowling Green	Kent State	1920	2026	94
Bowling Green–Toledo	Battle of I-75 Trophy	Bowling Green	Toledo	1919	2026	91
Bridger's Battle	Bridger Rifle	Utah State	Wyoming	1903	2024	73
BYU–Utah State	The Old Wagon Wheel	BYU	Utah State	1922	2022	91
California–UCLA		California	UCLA	1933	2026	95
California–USC		California	USC	1912	2023	112
Central Michigan–Eastern Michigan		Central Michigan	Eastern Michigan	1902	2026	104
Central Michigan–Western Michigan	Victory Cannon	Central Michigan	Western Michigan	1907	2026	97
Centre–Kentucky		Centre	Kentucky	1891	1929	35
Chicago–Michigan		Chicago	Michigan	1892	1939	26
Chicago–Purdue		Chicago	Purdue	1892	1936	42
Cincinnati–Louisville	The Keg of Nails	Cincinnati	Louisville	1929	2022	54
Cincinnati–Memphis		Cincinnati	Memphis	1966	2020	37
Cincinnati–UCF		Cincinnati	UCF	2015	2025	11
Cincinnati–West Virginia		Cincinnati	West Virginia	1921	2026	23
Clean, Old-Fashioned Hate	Governor's Cup	Georgia	Georgia Tech	1893	2025	119
Clemson–Florida State		Clemson	Florida State	1970	2025	38
Clemson–Georgia		Clemson	Georgia	1897	2024	66
Clemson–Georgia Tech		Clemson	Georgia Tech	1898	2026	91
Coastal Carolina–Liberty		Coastal Carolina	Liberty	2003	2026	16
Colorado–Kansas State		Colorado	Kansas State	1912	2026	69
Colorado–Nebraska		Colorado	Nebraska	1898	2024	73
Crab Bowl Classic	Crab Bowl Trophy	Maryland	Navy	1905	2010	21
Deeper than Hate		Appalachian State	Georgia Southern	1932	2026	42
Deep South's Oldest Rivalry		Auburn	Georgia	1892	2026	131
Dick Tomey Legacy Game	Dick Tomey Legacy Trophy	Hawaii	San José State	1936	2026	48
Duel in the Desert	Territorial Cup	Arizona	Arizona State	1899	2025	99
Duke–Georgia Tech		Duke	Georgia Tech	1933	2026	93
Duke–North Carolina	Victory Bell	Duke	North Carolina	1888	2026	113
Duke–NC State		Duke	NC State	1924	2026	87
Duke–Virginia		Duke	Virginia	1890	2026	78
Duke–Wake Forest		Duke	Wake Forest	1889	2025	105
East Carolina–Marshall		East Carolina	Marshall	1967	2023	17
East Carolina–NC State	Victory Barrel	East Carolina	NC State	1970	2025	34
Egg Bowl	Golden Egg Trophy	Mississippi State	Ole Miss	1901	2025	122
Farmageddon		Iowa State	Kansas State	1917	2025	109
Florida–Florida State	Makala Trophy, Florida Cup	Florida	Florida State	1958	2025	69
Florida–Georgia	Okefenokee Oar	Florida	Georgia	1915	2026	104
Florida–Kentucky		Florida	Kentucky	1917	2026	77
Florida–LSU		Florida	LSU	1937	2025	72
Florida–Miami	Florida Cup, Seminole War Canoe	Florida	Miami (FL)	1938	2025	58
Florida–Tennessee		Florida	Tennessee	1916	2025	55
Florida State–Miami	Florida Cup	Florida State	Miami (FL)	1951	2026	71
Florida State–Virginia	Jefferson–Eppes Trophy	Florida State	Virginia	1992	2026	21
Frank Leahy Memorial Bowl	Ireland Trophy	Boston College	Notre Dame	1975	2026	29
Fresno State–Hawaii	Golden Screwdriver	Fresno State	Hawaii	1938	2025	57
Fresno State–San Diego State	Oil Can	Fresno State	San Diego State	1923	2026	64
Friends of Coal Bowl		Marshall	West Virginia	1911	2012	12
Georgia–South Carolina		Georgia	South Carolina	1894	2026	77
Georgia–Tennessee		Georgia	Tennessee	1899	2025	55
Georgia–Vanderbilt		Georgia	Vanderbilt	1893	2026	84
Georgia Grown Bowl		Georgia Southern	Georgia State	2014	2026	13
Georgia Tech–Tennessee		Georgia Tech	Tennessee	1902	2026	45
Georgia Tech–Vanderbilt	Gold Cowbell	Georgia Tech	Vanderbilt	1892	2024	39
Governors' Trophy Game	The Governors' Perpetual Trophy	Oregon	Saint Mary's	1929	1950	10
Green Line Rivalry		Boston College	Boston University	1893	1962	32
Hawaii–Wyoming	Paniolo Trophy	Hawaii	Wyoming	1978	2026	30
Holy War		BYU	Utah	1896	2026	104
Houston–Rice	Bayou Bucket	Houston	Rice	1971	2025	47
Houston–SMU		Houston	SMU	1975	2022	37
Houston–Texas Tech		Houston	Texas Tech	1951	2026	37
I-35 Rivalry		Texas State	UTSA	2012	2026	8
Illinois–Indiana		Illinois	Indiana	1899	2025	74
Illinois–Iowa		Illinois	Iowa	1899	2026	80
Illinois–Michigan		Illinois	Michigan	1898	2024	98
Illinois–Northwestern	Land of Lincoln Trophy	Illinois	Northwestern	1892	2025	119
Illinois–Ohio State	Illibuck	Illinois	Ohio State	1902	2026	105
Illinois–Purdue	Purdue Cannon	Illinois	Purdue	1890	2026	102
Indiana–Kentucky	The Bourbon Barrel	Indiana	Kentucky	1893	2005	36
Indiana–Michigan State	Old Brass Spittoon	Indiana	Michigan State	1922	2025	72
Indiana–Purdue	Old Oaken Bucket	Indiana	Purdue	1891	2025	127
Iowa–Iowa State	Cy-Hawk Trophy	Iowa	Iowa State	1894	2026	73
Iowa–Minnesota	Floyd of Rosedale	Iowa	Minnesota	1891	2026	120
Iowa–Nebraska	Heroes Trophy	Iowa	Nebraska	1891	2025	56
Iowa–Wisconsin	Heartland Trophy	Iowa	Wisconsin	1894	2026	100
Iowa State–Missouri	Telephone Trophy	Iowa State	Missouri	1896	2011	104
Iowa State–Nebraska		Iowa State	Nebraska	1896	2010	104
Iron Bowl	James E. Foy, V-ODK Sportsmanship Trophy	Alabama	Auburn	1893	2025	90
Kansas–Nebraska		Kansas	Nebraska	1892	2010	117
Kansas State–Missouri		Kansas State	Missouri	1909	2023	99
Kansas State–Nebraska		Kansas State	Nebraska	1911	2010	95
Kentucky–Louisville	Governor's Cup	Kentucky	Louisville	1912	2025	37
Kentucky–Tennessee		Kentucky	Tennessee	1893	2026	122
Kentucky–Vanderbilt		Kentucky	Vanderbilt	1896	2026	99
Keystone Classic		Penn State	Pittsburgh	1893	2019	100
Lone Star Showdown		Texas	Texas A&M	1894	2025	120
Louisiana–Louisiana Tech		Louisiana	Louisiana Tech	1910	2026	88
Louisiana Tech–Louisiana–Monroe		Louisiana Tech	Louisiana–Monroe	1953	2026	44
Louisville–Memphis		Louisville	Memphis	1948	2013	43
Louisville–Miami	Schnellenberger Trophy	Louisville	Miami (FL)	1933	2025	18
LSU–Mississippi State		LSU	Mississippi State	1896	2026	118
LSU–Texas A&M		LSU	Texas A&M	1899	2026	65
Magnolia Bowl	Magnolia Bowl Trophy	LSU	Ole Miss	1894	2026	115
Maryland–Penn State		Maryland	Penn State	1917	2024	48
Maryland–Rutgers		Maryland	Rutgers	1920	2026	22
Maryland–Virginia		Maryland	Virginia	1919	2024	80
Maryland–West Virginia		Maryland	West Virginia	1919	2021	53
Miami–Nebraska		Miami (FL)	Nebraska	1951	2015	12
Miami–Virginia Tech		Miami (FL)	Virginia Tech	1953	2026	43
Michigan–Michigan State	Paul Bunyan Trophy	Michigan	Michigan State	1898	2026	119
Michigan–Minnesota	Little Brown Jug	Michigan	Minnesota	1892	2026	107
Michigan–Northwestern	George Jewitt Trophy	Michigan	Northwestern	1892	2025	78
Michigan–Notre Dame		Michigan	Notre Dame	1887	2019	44
Michigan–Penn State		Michigan	Penn State	1993	2026	28
Michigan State–Notre Dame	Megaphone Trophy	Michigan State	Notre Dame	1897	2026	80
Mid–South Rivalry		Memphis	Ole Miss	1921	2019	64
Minnesota–Nebraska	$5 Bits of Broken Chair Trophy	Minnesota	Nebraska	1900	2025	65
Minnesota–Penn State	Governor's Victory Bell	Minnesota	Penn State	1993	2026	18
Minnesota–Wisconsin	Paul Bunyan's Axe	Minnesota	Wisconsin	1890	2025	135
Missouri–Nebraska	Victory Bell	Missouri	Nebraska	1892	2010	104
Missouri–Oklahoma	Tiger–Sooner Peace Pipe	Missouri	Oklahoma	1902	2025	98
Navy–SMU	Gansz Trophy	Navy	SMU	1930	2023	25
Navy–Notre Dame	Rip Miller Trophy	Navy	Notre Dame	1927	2026	99
NC State–Wake Forest		NC State	Wake Forest	1895	2026	120
Nebraska–Oklahoma		Nebraska	Oklahoma	1912	2023	88
Nebraska–Wisconsin	Freedom Trophy	Nebraska	Wisconsin	1901	2024	18
North Carolina–NC State		North Carolina	NC State	1894	2025	115
North Carolina–Wake Forest		North Carolina	Wake Forest	1888	2025	112
Northwestern–Notre Dame		Northwestern	Notre Dame	1889	2018	49
Notre Dame–Pittsburgh		Notre Dame	Pittsburgh	1909	2025	74
Notre Dame–Purdue	Shillelagh Trophy	Notre Dame	Purdue	1896	2026	90
Notre Dame–Stanford	Legends Trophy	Notre Dame	Stanford	1925	2026	40
Notre Dame–USC	Jeweled Shillelagh	Notre Dame	USC	1926	2025	96
Ohio State–Penn State		Ohio State	Penn State	1912	2025	41
Oklahoma State–Tulsa		Oklahoma State	Tulsa	1914	2026	78
Ole Miss–Tulane		Ole Miss	Tulane	1893	2025	75
Ole Miss–Vanderbilt		Ole Miss	Vanderbilt	1894	2026	99
Oregon–Oregon State	Platypus Trophy	Oregon	Oregon State	1894	2025	129
Oregon–Stanford		Oregon	Stanford	1900	2023	87
Oregon–USC		Oregon	USC	1915	2026	66
Oregon–Washington		Oregon	Washington	1900	2025	118
Oregon State–Washington State	No Name Trophy	Oregon State	Washington State	1903	2026	112
Pacific–San José State	Victory Bell	Pacific	San José State	1895	1995	72
Paint Bucket Bowl		Arkansas State	Memphis	1914	2026	63
Palmetto Bowl		Clemson	South Carolina	1896	2025	122
Penn State–Syracuse		Penn State	Syracuse	1922	2013	71
Penn State–West Virginia		Penn State	West Virginia	1904	2024	61
Pittsburgh–Syracuse		Pittsburgh	Syracuse	1916	2026	82
Red River Rivalry	Golden Hat	Oklahoma	Texas	1900	2026	122
Rice–SMU	Mayor's Cup	Rice	SMU	1916	2023	91
Rice–Texas		Rice	Texas	1914	2023	97
Rio Grande Rivalry	The Roaster	New Mexico	New Mexico State	1894	2026	116
Rivalry in Dixie		Louisiana Tech	Southern Miss	1935	2026	55
Rocky Mountain Showdown	Centennial Cup	Colorado	Colorado State	1893	2024	93
Royal Rivalry	Royal Rivalry Trophy	James Madison	Old Dominion	2011	2026	7
Rumble in the Rockies		Colorado	Utah	1903	2026	73
Safeway Bowl		North Texas	SMU	1922	2023	43
Sam Houston–Texas State		Sam Houston	Texas State	1915	2024	93
Sewanee–Vanderbilt		Sewanee	Vanderbilt	1891	1944	52
Shula Bowl	Don Shula Award	Florida Atlantic	FIU	2002	2026	24
South's Oldest Rivalry		North Carolina	Virginia	1892	2026	131
Stanford–UCLA		Stanford	UCLA	1925	2023	95
Stanford–USC		Stanford	USC	1905	2023	103
Sunflower Showdown	Governor's Cup	Kansas	Kansas State	1902	2026	124
Syracuse–UConn		Syracuse	UConn	2004	2026	15
Syracuse–West Virginia	Ben Schwartzwalder Trophy	Syracuse	West Virginia	1945	2018	61
TCU–Texas		TCU	Texas	1897	2023	94
TCU–Texas A&M		TCU	Texas A&M	1897	2001	92
TCU–Texas Tech	Saddle Trophy	TCU	Texas Tech	1926	2024	67
Techmo Bowl		Georgia Tech	Virginia Tech	1990	2026	22
Tennessee–Vanderbilt		Tennessee	Vanderbilt	1892	2025	120
Texas–Texas Tech	Chancellor's Spurs	Texas	Texas Tech	1928	2023	73
Texas A&M–Texas Tech		Texas A&M	Texas Tech	1927	2011	70
Textile Bowl	Textile Bowl	Clemson	NC State	1899	2024	92
The Game		Michigan	Ohio State	1897	2025	120
The Old Mountain Feud		Appalachian State	Marshall	1977	2026	29
Third Saturday in October		Alabama	Tennessee	1901	2026	109
Tiger Bowl		Auburn	LSU	1901	2026	59
UConn–UMass	Southwick Jug	UConn	UMass	1897	2026	79
UCLA–USC	Victory Bell	UCLA	USC	1929	2025	95
Virginia Tech–West Virginia	Black Diamond Trophy	Virginia Tech	West Virginia	1912	2022	54
Virginia–Virginia Tech	Commonwealth Cup	Virginia	Virginia Tech	1895	2025	106
War on I–4	War on I–4 Trophy	South Florida	UCF	2005	2022	14

=== Rivalries involving more than two teams ===
Series	Trophy	Teams	First meeting
	Beehive Boot	BYU, Utah, Utah State (previously Weber State)	1971
	Commander-in-Chief's Trophy	Air Force, Army, Navy	1972
	Florida Cup	Florida, Florida State, Miami (FL)	2002
Battle for the Michigan MAC	Michigan MAC Trophy	Central Michigan, Eastern Michigan, Western Michigan	2005
Northwest Championship		Oregon, Oregon State, Washington, Washington State	1903
Tri-State Big Three	Old Ironsides	Penn State, Pittsburgh, West Virginia	1900
	Sacred Cod Trophy	Boston College, Boston University, Holy Cross	1954
Tobacco Road		Duke, North Carolina, NC State, Wake Forest	1924

== NCAA Division I Football Championship Subdivision ==
Game	Trophy	Team	Team	First Year	Latest Year	Meetings
Battle for the Brice–Cowell Musket	Brice–Cowell Musket	Maine	New Hampshire	1903	2026	116
Battle for the Golden Horseshoe	The Golden Horseshoe	Cal Poly	UC Davis	1939	2026	52
Battle of the Bay		Hampton	Norfolk State	1963	2026	61
Battle of the Border		Lamar	McNeese	1951	2026	44
Bayou Classic		Grambling State	Southern	1974	2025	77
Beehive Bowl		Southern Utah	Weber State	1984	2026	30
Brawl of the Wild	The Great Divide Trophy	Montana	Montana State	1897	2026	126
Brown–Rhode Island	Governor's Cup	Brown	Rhode Island	1909	2026	110
Butler–Valparaiso	Hoosier Helmet Trophy	Butler	Valparaiso	1927	2026	86
Capital Cup	Capital Cup	Richmond	William & Mary	1898	2026	137
Colgate–Cornell		Colgate	Cornell	1896	2026	107
Cornell–Dartmouth		Cornell	Dartmouth	1900	2026	109
Cornell–Penn	Trustees' Cup	Cornell	Penn	1893	2026	132
Dartmouth–Harvard		Dartmouth	Harvard	1882	2026	129
Eastern Kentucky–Morehead State	Old Hawg Rifle	Eastern Kentucky	Morehead State	1924	2024	74
Eastern Washington–Portland State	The Dam Cup	Eastern Washington	Portland State	1968	2026	47
Empire Clash	The Golden Apple Trophy	Albany	Stony Brook	1995	2026	28
Empire State Bowl	Empire Cup	Columbia	Cornell	1889	2026	113
Drake–Northern Iowa		Drake	Northern Iowa	1900	2026	48
EWU–UM Governors Cup	The Governors Cup	Eastern Washington	Montana	1967	2026	52
Florida Classic		Bethune–Cookman	Florida A&M	1925	2026	81
Fordham–Holy Cross	Ram–Crusader Cup	Fordham	Holy Cross	1902	2026	64
Furman–Wofford		Furman	Wofford	1889	2026	100
Grand Canyon Rivalry	HintonBurdick Grand Canyon Trophy	Northern Arizona	Southern Utah	1982	2026	28
Granite Bowl	Granite Bowl	Dartmouth	New Hampshire	1901	2025	43
Harvard–Penn		Harvard	Penn	1881	2026	96
Harvard–Princeton		Harvard	Princeton	1877	2026	118
Howard–Morgan State		Howard	Morgan State	1899	2026	92
Idaho–Idaho State	The Potato State Trophy	Idaho	Idaho State	1916	2026	48
Idaho–Montana	Little Brown Stein	Idaho	Montana	1903	2026	91
Jackson State–Southern	BoomBox Classic	Jackson State	Southern	1929	2026	74
Labor Day Classic	Durley-Nicks Trophy	Prairie View A&M	Texas Southern	1947	2026	82
Liberty Cup	Liberty Cup	Columbia	Fordham	1890	2015	24
Magic City Classic	Magic City Classic Trophy	Alabama A&M	Alabama State	1924	2026	91
McNeese–Northwestern State		McNeese	Northwestern State	1951	2026	75
Mid-America Classic	Mid-America Classic	Eastern Illinois	Illinois State	1901	2026	114
Military Classic of the South	Silver Shako	The Citadel	VMI	1920	2026	82
North Carolina A&T–North Carolina Central		North Carolina A&T	North Carolina Central	1922	2026	98
North Carolina A&T–South Carolina State		North Carolina A&T	South Carolina State	1924	2025	61
North Dakota–South Dakota	Sitting Bull Trophy	North Dakota	South Dakota	1903	2026	104
Northwestern State–Southeastern Louisiana		Northwestern State	Southeastern Louisiana	1935	2026	71
Northwestern State–Stephen F. Austin	The Chief	Northwestern State	Stephen F. Austin	1924	2026	79
NSU Challenge	NSU Trophy	Nicholls	Northwestern State	1973	2026	53
Penn–Princeton		Penn	Princeton	1876	2026	117
Princeton–Yale		Princeton	Yale	1873	2026	148
Red Beans and Rice Bowl	50 Pound Iron Pot	Central Arkansas	McNeese	1994	2019	13
Richmond–VMI		Richmond	VMI	1893	2025	91
River Bell Classic	River Bell Trophy	Nicholls	Southeastern Louisiana	1972	2026	37
Soul Bowl		Alcorn State	Jackson State	1927	2026	91
South Dakota Showdown Series		South Dakota	South Dakota State	1889	2026	119
State Fair Classic		Grambling State	Prairie View A&M	1925	2026	80
The Battle for Greater Baltimore		Morgan State	Towson	1979	2026	31
The Citadel–Furman		The Citadel	Furman	1913	2026	106
The Citadel–Wofford	Big Dog Trophy	The Citadel	Wofford	1916	2026	80
The Game		Harvard	Yale	1875	2026	142
The Real HU		Hampton	Howard	1908	2026	101
The Rivalry		Lafayette	Lehigh	1884	2026	162
VMI–William & Mary		VMI	William & Mary	1905	2024	89

=== Rivalries involving more than two teams ===
Series	Trophy	Teams	First meeting
Big Three		Harvard, Princeton, Yale	1877
	Sgt. York Trophy	Tennessee State, UT Martin (previously Austin Peay and Tennessee Tech)	2007

== Rivalries involving FBS and FCS teams ==
This list is restricted to rivalries whose participants are currently in different Division I football subdivisions, and have played one another while in different subdivisions. Most of these began when both teams competed in the same (sub)division.

In this list, the FCS team is in italics.

Game	Trophy	Team	Team	First Year	Latest Year	Meetings
Akron–Youngstown State	Steel Tire	Akron	Youngstown State	1940	1995	35
Ball State–Indiana State	Blue Key Victory Bell	Ball State	Indiana State	1924	2023	64
Battle for the Paddle	Paddle Trophy	Nicholls	Texas State	1980	2025	32
Battle for the Red Belt	Red Belt	Murray State	Western Kentucky	1931	2008	67
Battle of the Bluegrass		Eastern Kentucky	Western Kentucky	1914	2024	86
Battle of the Palouse		Idaho (Note: Idaho returned to FCS in 2018, joining the Big Sky Conference)	Washington State	1894	2025	94
Boston College–Holy Cross		Boston College	Holy Cross	1896	2023	84
City Game		Duquesne	Pittsburgh	1901	2025	9
Colgate–Syracuse		Colgate	Syracuse	1891	2025	69
Lamar–Louisiana	Sabine Shoe	Lamar	Louisiana	1923	2026	35
Louisiana–McNeese	Cajun Crown	Louisiana	McNeese	1951	2025	39
Louisiana–Southeastern Louisiana	Cypress Mug	Louisiana	Southeastern Louisiana	1930	2022	41
Louisiana Tech–Northwestern State		Louisiana Tech	Northwestern State	1907	2026	81
Norfolk State–Old Dominion		Norfolk State	Old Dominion	2011	2026	5
Rhode Island–UConn		Rhode Island	UConn	1897	2018	94
Route 1 Rivalry	First State Cup	Delaware	Delaware State	2007	2025	12
Temple–Villanova	Mayor's Cup	Temple	Villanova	1928	2018	34
VMI–Virginia Tech		VMI	Virginia Tech	1894	2026	80

== NCAA Division II ==
Game	Trophy	Team	Team	First Year	Latest Year	Meetings
26th Street Tussle	Key to the City	Augustana (SD)	Sioux Falls	1916	2026	34
Anchor–Bone Classic	Anchor–Bone Trophy	Ferris State	Grand Valley State	1971	2026	58
Battle for the Peach Basket	Peach State Bragging Trophy (The Peach Basket)	Valdosta State	West Georgia^{FCS}	1983	2023 (Note: Rivalry ended after the 2023 season, with West Georgia moving to Division I FCS in 2024.)	43
Battle in Seattle	Cascade Cup	Central Washington	Western Washington	1922	2008 (Note: Rivalry ended after the 2008 season, when Western Washington cut its football program.)	101
Battle for the Bit	Heavy Mining Bit Trophy	Fairmont State	Glenville State	1909	2026	98
Battle for the Nyikos Cup	Nyikos Cup	Colorado Mesa	Colorado Mines	1975	2026	50
Battle for the Sledge	Sledge Hammer Trophy	Southwest Minnesota State	Winona State	1970	2026	55
Battle of the Ravine		Henderson State	Ouachita Baptist	1895	2026	99
Battle of the Timberlands		Arkansas–Monticello	Southern Arkansas	1913	2026	101
Battle of the Valleys		Grand Valley State	Saginaw Valley State	1975	2026	55
Black Hills Brawl	Homestake Trophy	Black Hills State	South Dakota Mines	1895	2026	141
Bronze Derby		Newberry	Presbyterian^{FCS}	1913	2006 (Note: Rivalry ended after the 2006 season, with Presbyterian moving to Division I FCS in 2007.)	93
Catawba vs. Lenoir–Rhyne		Catawba	Lenoir–Rhyne	1907	2025	104
Chile Bowl	Chile Bowl Trophy	Eastern New Mexico	Western New Mexico	1934	2025	64
Clash for the Pass	Clash for the Pass Trophy (Note: Previously the teams played for The Musket, Springfield .45-70 military-issue rifle, from 1966 to 2019.)	Adams State	Fort Lewis	1963	2026	64
Coal Bowl	Coal Miners Pail Trophy	California (PA)	Indiana (PA)	1908	2026	101
Coastal Classic	Coastal Classic Trophy	Florida Tech	West Florida^{FCS}	2016	2019 (Note: Rivalry ended in 2019 due to Florida Tech cutting its football program.)	4
Colorado Classic	Colorado Classic Trophy	Adams State	Western Colorado	1934	2026	79
Dog Fight	The Bone Trophy	Minnesota–Duluth	St. Cloud State	1933	2019 (Note: Rivalry ended when St. Cloud State cut its football program in fall of 2020.)	52
East Central−Southeastern Oklahoma State	Great American Classic Trophy	East Central	Southeastern Oklahoma State	1909	2025	110
Elm City rivalry	Elm City Trophy	New Haven^{FCS}	Southern Connecticut	1981	2024 (Note: Rivalry ended after the 2024 season, with New Haven moving to Division I FCS in 2025.)	35
Fountain City Classic		Albany State	Fort Valley State	1924	2026	92
	Heritage Bell	Delta State	Mississippi College	1979	2024 (Note: Rivalry ended when Mississippi College cut its football program after the 2024 season.)	44
	Milk Jug	Clarion	Slippery Rock	1910	2021	83
Miner's Bowl	Miner's Helmet and Axe	Missouri Southern	Pittsburg State	1968	2026	58
	Miner's Cup	Michigan Tech	Northern Michigan	1920	2026	99
Missouri Western–Northwest Missouri State		Missouri Western	Northwest Missouri State	1981	2025	46
	Niagara Cup	Gannon	Mercyhurst^{FCS}	1991	2023 (Note: Rivalry ended after the 2023 season, with Mercyhurst moving to Division I FCS in 2024.)	26
North Alabama−West Alabama		North Alabama^{FCS}	West Alabama	1949	2017 (Note: Rivalry ended after the 2017 season, with North Alabama moving to Division I FCS in 2018.)	71
Northwest Missouri State−Pittsburg State		Northwest Missouri State	Pittsburg State	1932	2025	58
Old Hickory Stick Game	Hickory Stick	Northwest Missouri State	Truman State	1908	2011	91
President's Cup	President's Cup	Central Oklahoma	Northeastern State	1912	2025	85
	Traveling Trophy	Ashland	Hillsdale	1970	2021	45
Turkey Day Classic		Alabama State^{FCS}	Tuskegee	1901	2025	109
Turnpike Tussle		Emporia State	Washburn	1899	2026	122
	Wagon Wheel	Eastern New Mexico	West Texas A&M	1934	2025	44
	Wooden Shoes Trophy	Grand Valley State	Wayne State	1975	2025	46

== NCAA Division III ==
Game	Trophy	Team	Team	First Year	Latest Year	Meetings
Academic Bowl	Academic Bowl	Carnegie Mellon	Case Western Reserve	1986	2024	38
Admiral's Cup	Admiral's Cup	Maine Maritime (Note: Maine Maritime suspended its football program in 2020 due to financial impacts from COVID-19. In 2023, the football program was reinstated.)	Mass Maritime	1946	2026	60
Backyard Brawl		Millsaps	Mississippi College	1920	2013 (Note: Rivalry ended when Mississippi College rejoined NCAA Division II in 2014. Mississippi College cut their football program in 2024.)	52
	Baird Brothers Trophy	Case Western Reserve	Wooster	1984	2012	25
Battle for the Border Claw	Border Claw Trophy	East Texas Baptist	Louisiana Christian^{NAIA}	1947	2019	22
Battle for the Drum	The Drum	Occidental	Pomona–Pitzer	1895 (Note: The rivalry began between Pomona and Occidental Colleges. Pomona now operates a joint athletic program with Pitzer College, both being among the five undergraduate Claremont Colleges, with the joint program known as Pomona–Pitzer.)	2019 (Note: Rivalry ended when Occidental cut their football program due to financial impacts from the COVID-19 pandemic and structural athletic challenges.)	112
Battle for the Wagon	Conestoga Wagon	Dickinson	Franklin & Marshall	1889	2026	117
Battle of Sixth Street	Battle of Sixth Street Trophy	Claremont–Mudd–Scripps	Pomona–Pitzer	1959 (Note: The rivalry began between Pomona and another Claremont College, Claremont McKenna. As noted previously, Pomona now operates a joint athletic program with another Claremont College, Pitzer College, as Pomona–Pitzer. Claremont McKenna is now part of the Claremont–Mudd–Scripps athletic program along with two other Claremont Colleges, Harvey Mudd and Scripps Colleges.)	2026	70
Biggest Little Game In America		Amherst	Williams	1884	2026	140
	The Book of Knowledge	Carleton	Macalester	1898	2026	71
The Bridge Bowl	Bridge Bowl Trophy	Mount St. Joseph	Thomas More (KY)^{NAIA}	1990	2013 (Note: Thomas More, which had left the NAIA for NCAA Division III in 1990, returned to the NAIA in 2019, and moved to NCAA Division II in 2023.)	18
Bronze Ball		Anderson (IN)	Manchester (IN)	1945 (Note: Bronze Ball awarded annually since 2001.)	2026	80
The Bronze Turkey Game or Turkey Bowl	The Bronze Turkey Trophy	Knox (IL)	Monmouth (IL)	1888	2023	134
	Centennial Cup	Hobart	Rochester	1892	2019	112
Cereal Bowl	Goat Trophy	Carleton	St. Olaf	1919	2025	105
The Chowder Bowl		Mass Maritime	SUNY Maritime	2007	2024	16
	Cortaca Jug	Ithaca	SUNY Cortland	1930	2026	84
Cranberry Bowl	The Scoop	Bridgewater State	Mass Maritime	1974	2019	46
Cuyahoga Gold Bowl Game	Cuyahoga Gold Bowl Trophy	Baldwin Wallace	John Carroll	1923	2024	64
	Doehling–Heselton Memorial Trophy	Lawrence	Ripon	1893	2026	124
	Dutchman's Shoes	RPI	Union (NY)	1886	2026	123
	Edmund Orgill Trophy	Rhodes	Sewanee	1899 (Note: This is the year the rivalry began. The Edmund Orgill Trophy was first competed for in 1954.)	2026	93
	Founders Trophy	Chicago	Washington (MO)	1933	2019	38
Gate City Soup Bowl		Greensboro	Guilford	1997	2016	20
Gettysburg–McDaniel		Gettysburg	McDaniel	1891	2019	73
	Goal Post Trophy	Juniata	Susquehanna	1923	2019	74
	The Hammer	Augsburg	Hamline	1926	2019	79
	Helmet Trophy	Anna Maria	Vermont State University Castleton	2009	2019	11
Tommie-Johnnie Game	The Holy Grail	Saint John's (MN)	St. Thomas (MN)^{FCS}	1901	2019 (Note: The 2020 game, which was intended to be the last in the rivalry, was not held due to COVID-19. St. Thomas involuntarily left the Minnesota Intercollegiate Athletic Conference (MIAC) in spring 2021, joining the Division I Summit League for most non-football sports and the FCS Pioneer Football League.)	89
Johns Hopkins–McDaniel	Maryland Railroad Lantern	Johns Hopkins	McDaniel	1894	2026	104
	Keystone Cup	Delaware Valley	Widener	1977	2019	42
Lefse Bowl	The Troll Trophy	Concordia (Moorhead)	St. Olaf	1921	2019	70
	Lincoln Football Trophy	Franklin & Marshall	Gettysburg	1890	2026	111
	Little Brass Bell	North Central (IL)	Wheaton (IL)	1900	2026	107
	Little Brown Bucket	Dickinson	Gettysburg	1892	2023	88
	Maple Sap Bucket	Norwich	Vermont State University Castleton	2009	2026	17
	Mercer County Cup	Grove City	Thiel	1892	2024	110
Monon Bell Classic	Monon Bell	DePauw	Wabash	1890	2026	132
Occidental–Whittier	Myron Claxton's Shoes	Occidental	Whittier	1901	2019 (Note: Rivalry ended with Occidental's discontinuation of its football program amidst the COVID-19 pandemic, and Whittier's discontinuation of football following the 2022 season.)	111
	Old Red Lantern	Denison	Wooster	1889	2026	94
Old Rocking Chair Classic	Mac-Jack Rocking Chair	Hamilton	Middlebury	1911	2024	66
Oldest College Rivalry West of the Mississippi		Coe	Cornell (IA)	1891	2025	134
	Paint Bucket	Hamline	Macalester	1887	2024	123
Pynchon Saw Game	Pynchon Saw Trophy	Springfield College (MA)	Western New England University (MA)	2013	2025	12
Seafaring Scuffle		Merchant Marine	SUNY Maritime	2009	2019	11
	Secretaries' Cup	Coast Guard	Merchant Marine	1949	2026	55
Smudge Pot Trophy Game	The Smudge Pot	California Lutheran	Redlands	2012	2023	11
The Little Army–Navy Game	The Mug	Coast Guard	Norwich Cadet	1929	2024	96
	Steven Dean Memorial Trophy	Catholic	Georgetown^{FCS}	1976	2019	19
The Game (Hampden–Sydney vs. Randolph–Macon)	The Game Ball	Hampden–Sydney	Randolph–Macon	1893	2026	130
	The Regents Cup	Frostburg State^{D-II}	Salisbury	1973	2018	46
	The Stagg Hat	Lycoming	Susquehanna	1949	2019	55
Transit Trophy Game	The Transit Trophy	RPI	WPI	1894	2026	119
Trinity–Wesleyan		Trinity	Wesleyan	1885	2026	125
	The Trophy	Pacific Lutheran	Puget Sound	1931	2022	98
Victory Bell Classic	Victory Bell	Franklin (IN)	Hanover	1898	2024	94
	Wagon Wheel	Lewis & Clark	Willamette	1948	2024	75
	War on I-94 Trophy	Wisconsin–Eau Claire	Wisconsin–Stout	1917	2024	97
	Wilkes-Barre Mayor's Cup	King's (PA)	Wilkes	1946 (Note: King's and Wilkes first meeting was in 1946 and had played nine more times before the establishment of the trophy. The first game for the Wilkes-Barre Mayor's Cup was in 1996, per King's College's preview of the 2009 game.)	2025	40
	Wooden Shoes Rivalry Trophy	Hope College (MI)	Kalamazoo College (MI)	1910	2024	103

=== Rivalries involving more than two teams ===
Series	Trophy	Teams	First meeting
Colby-Bates-Bowdoin Consortium	C-B-B Trophy	Bates, Bowdoin, Colby	1892
Little Three		Amherst, Wesleyan, Williams	1899

=== Longest continuous NCAA college football rivalries ===
Following are the longest active continuously-played series in NCAA college football. Many historic series were interrupted by World War I, the 1918 flu pandemic and World War II. More recently, other longstanding rivalries were terminated by the conference realignments of the early 2010s and early 2020s, or were interrupted by the COVID-19 pandemic.

Series	Continuous since	Series nickname / Trophy	NCAA Div.	First meeting	Series leader	Notes
Lehigh–Lafayette	1897	The Rivalry	FCS	1884	Lafayette	Most played series in college football. No game played in calendar 2020 due to COVID-19, but played in April 2021 as part of the Patriot League's rescheduled spring 2021 season.
Minnesota–Wisconsin	1907	Paul Bunyan's Axe	FBS	1890	Minnesota	Most played series in FBS
North Carolina State–Wake Forest	1910	NC State–Wake Forest rivalry	FBS	1895	NC State	
Kansas–Kansas State	1911	Sunflower Showdown	FBS	1902	Kansas	
Iowa State–Kansas State	1917	Farmageddon	FBS	1917	Iowa State	Longest never interrupted series in FBS
North Carolina–Virginia	1919	South's Oldest Rivalry	FBS	1892	North Carolina	

Note: The NCAA also lists as "continuous" the following rivalries interrupted by gaps during war years: North Carolina–Virginia (1910–1916, 1919–current); Mississippi–Mississippi State (1915–1942, 1944–current); Auburn–Georgia (1919–1942, 1944–current); Tennessee–Kentucky (1919–1942, 1944–current). Other rivalries were also interrupted during war years, for example: Harvard–Yale (1897–1916, 1919–1943, 1945–present); Princeton–Yale (1876–1916, 1919–1943, 1945–present); Miami–Cincinnati (1909–1942, 1945–present); and Oregon-Oregon State (1912–1942, 1945–present). The NCAA does not explain how it selects only some interrupted rivalries to count as "continuous."

=== Longest interrupted NCAA college football rivalries ===
Following are the NCAA Division I and II series that continued for the most consecutive seasons before being interrupted. Eight of the eighteen series on this list are defunct rivalries from the old Big Eight Conference. Six are rivalries interrupted in 2020 due to the COVID-19 pandemic.

Series	Continuous years	Length	NCAA Div.	First meeting	Notes / reason for interruption
North Dakota State–South Dakota State (Dakota Marker)	1903–2025	118 years	FCS	1903	Ended by North Dakota State's move to the Mountain West Conference/FBS
Oklahoma–Oklahoma State	1910–2023	114 years	FBS	1910	Ended by Oklahoma's move to the Southeastern Conference.
Clemson–South Carolina	1909–2019	111 years	FBS	1896	Interrupted in 2020 due to COVID-19 pandemic
North Dakota–North Dakota State (Nickel Trophy)	1894–2003	110 years	Div II/FCS	1894	Interrupted in 2004 due to North Dakota State's reclassification to Division I, resumed annual games in 2019 before being interrupted again in 2026 due to North Dakota State's move to the Mountain West Conference/FBS
Wabash–DePauw	1911–2019	109 years	Div. III	1890	Interrupted in 2020 due to COVID-19 pandemic
Nebraska–Kansas	1906–2010	105 years	FBS	1892	Longest continuous series in FBS before interruption Ended by Nebraska's move to the Big Ten
Michigan–Ohio State	1918–2019	102 years	FBS	1897	Interrupted in 2020 due to COVID-19 pandemic
Dartmouth–Cornell	1919–2019	101 years	FCS	1900	Interrupted in 2020 due to COVID-19 pandemic
Penn–Cornell	1919–2019	101 years	FCS	1893	Interrupted in 2020 due to COVID-19 pandemic
Purdue–Indiana	1920–2019	100 years	FBS	1891	Interrupted in 2020 due to COVID-19 pandemic
Texas–Texas A&M	1915–2011	97 years	FBS	1894	Ended by Texas A&M's move to the SEC; resumed in 2024 with Texas' move to the SEC
Oklahoma–Kansas	1903–1997	95 years	FBS	1903	Longest continuous series in FBS until annual play ended in 1997; Ended by advent of Big 12 divisional play Annual play resumed in 2011 with end of Big 12 divisional play, and ended again with Oklahoma's 2024 move to the SEC
Missouri–Kansas	1919–2011	93 years	FBS	1891	Ended by Missouri's move to the SEC
Missouri–Iowa State	1919–2011	93 years	FBS	1896	Ended by Missouri's move to the SEC
Nebraska–Iowa State	1921–2010	90 years	FBS	1896	Ended by Nebraska's move to the Big Ten
Duke–Georgia Tech	1933–2022	90 years	FBS	1933	Rivalry pre-dates Georgia Tech's admission into the Atlantic Coast Conference (ACC) in 1983. Ended by changes to the ACC's scheduling format effective in 2023.
Nebraska–Kansas State	1922–2010	89 years	FBS	1911	Ended by Nebraska's move to the Big Ten
Nebraska–Missouri	1922–2010	89 years	FBS	1892	Ended by Nebraska's move to the Big Ten
Ohio State–Illinois	1914–2002	89 years	FBS	1902	Ended by Big Ten's change to non-round robin scheduling
Presbyterian–Newberry	1919–2006	88 years	Div. II	1913	Ended by Presbyterian's move to Division I

== See also ==
- Lambert-Meadowlands Trophy (top team in the Northeast)
- College rivalry#United States
- List of black college football classics
