= Penn State–Pittsburgh football rivalry =

American college football rivalry

Keystone Classic
- Penn State Nittany Lions Pittsburgh Panthers
- First meeting: November 6, 1893; Penn State 32, Pittsburgh 0
- Latest meeting: September 14, 2019; Penn State 17, Pittsburgh 10
- Trophy: Spalding Trophy (1908–1911); Spalding Trophy (1912–1915)

Statistics
- Total meetings: 100
- All-time series: Penn State leads, 53–43–4
- Largest victory: Penn State, 59–0 (1903)
- Longest win streak: Pittsburgh, 14 (1922–1938)
- Current win streak: Penn State, 3 (2017–present)

Locations of Penn State and Pittsburgh

The Penn State–Pittsburgh football rivalry is a long-standing American college football rivalry between the Penn State Nittany Lions and Pittsburgh Panthers. The game played in 2019 was the 100th edition of the rivalry game. Penn State has not played more games against any other opponent, whereas Pitt has only played more against West Virginia University. After the rivalry resumed in 2016, it was branded "The Keystone Classic" with Peoples Natural Gas as its corporate sponsor. A four-game series between Pitt and Penn State ended in 2019 and there is no future game planned.

Penn State won 12 of the first 15, but Pitt dominated afterwards, going 21–2–2 (1913–1940). Pitt at one point won 14 straight times (1922–1938). Pitt coach Jock Sutherland never lost to Penn State (1924–1938). From 1941 to 1951, the rivalry was much more even, as Pitt went 6–5 against Penn State in that span. From 1952 on, Penn State has dominated, going 34–13–2, including wins in ten of the last twelve games. Former Penn State coach Joe Paterno went 23–7–1 against Pitt (1966–1992, 1997–2000).

== Series history ==
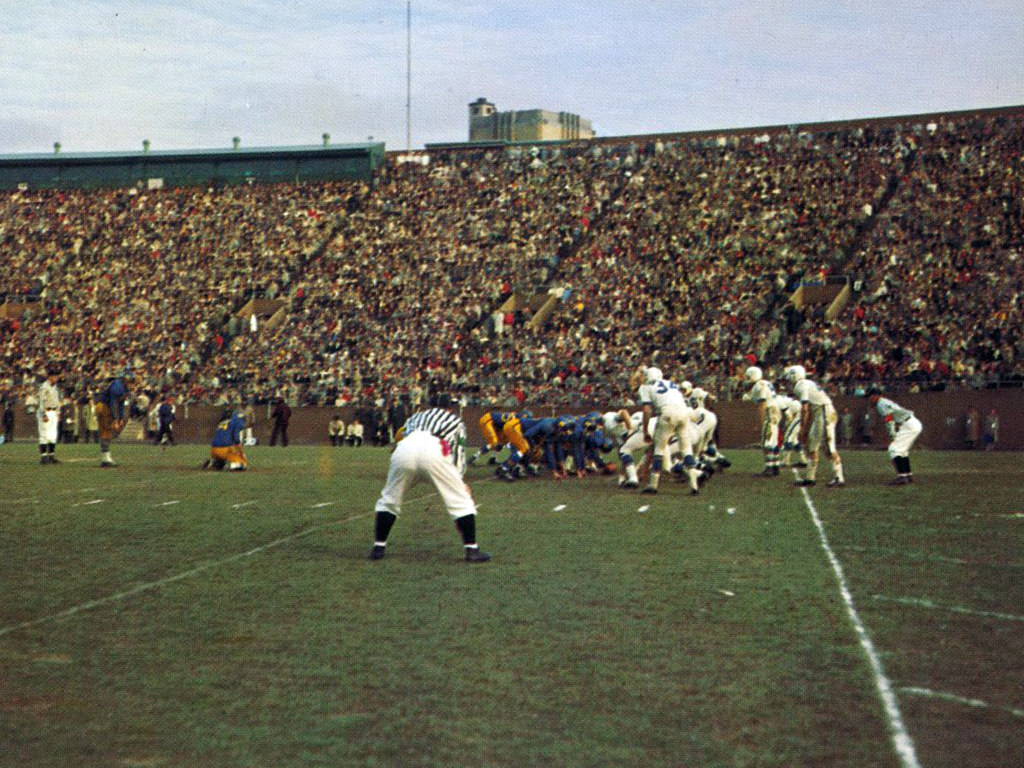
Pitt versus Penn State at Pitt Stadium on November 27, 1958

Once considered one of the most important college football rivalries north of the Mason–Dixon line, this intrastate rivalry was deemed the biggest annual game for both schools for a large part of their histories. The game often had regional and national implications with the winner often claiming Eastern college football supremacy and its respective Lambert-Meadowlands Trophy.

The first game was played on November 6, 1893, in State College, PA, with Penn State prevailing 32–0. Penn State won the first six meetings. This was also the first game to be played in Old Beaver Field.

Pitt's first victory in the series occurred on November 24, 1904, in Pittsburgh, 22–5.

Starting in 1904, the schools were considered as part of the "tri-state district Big Three" alongside West Virginia and competed for the "district Big Three championship" annually, a distinction earned by attaining the best record against the other two. This became an annual round-robin and in 1951 the Old Ironsides Trophy was introduced and awarded to the champion of the three. The trio played annually until West Virginia won its second outright title in 1984 and Penn State was unable to locate the trophy. With the loss of the trophy and deregionalization of college football, the three-team rivalry increasingly became three distinct head-to-head matchups with little to no connection.

The 1963 game was originally scheduled for Saturday, November 23, but was postponed to December 7 following the assassination of John F. Kennedy the day before. The once-beaten Panthers were being touted as a possible Cotton Bowl participant, but the bowl representatives expressed desire to invite Pitt only if they had one loss. With the game postponed until December 7, the Cotton Bowl could not wait. Pitt beat Penn State 22–21, finishing the season 9–1, with no bowl.

The 1976 game pitted undefeated Pitt, ranked number one in the nation, against Penn State at Three Rivers Stadium on the night after Thanksgiving, November 26. The score was tied 7–7 at the half. Pitt's coach Johnny Majors moved Tony Dorsett to fullback for the second half, and the Panthers went on to win 24–7, finishing the regular season 11–0, on their way to a Sugar Bowl victory over Georgia and their first National Championship in 39 years.

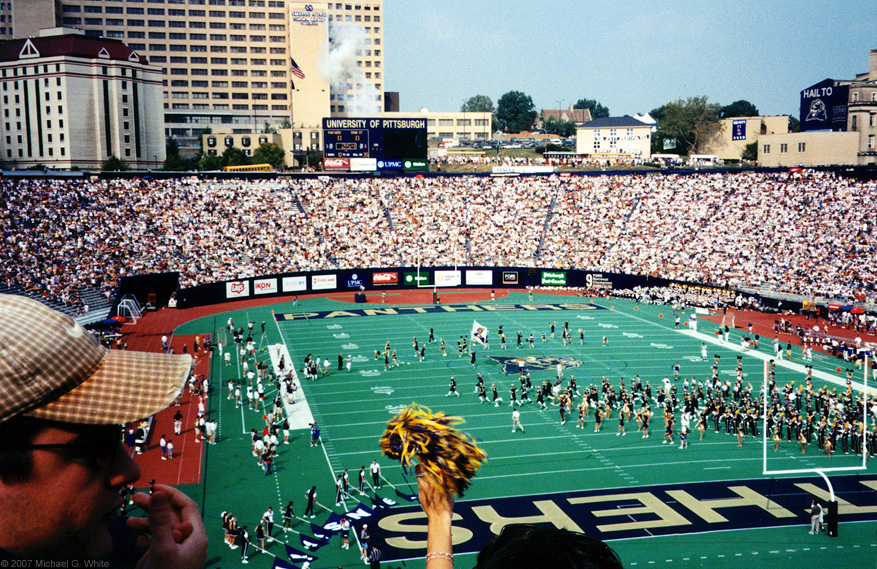
1998 game at Pitt Stadium

The 1981 game was one for the ages. Pitt was once again undefeated at 10–0 and number one in the nation, ready to claim the title, "Beast of the East". The Nittany Lions had other ideas when they came to Pitt Stadium on November 28. The game featured two junior quarterbacks, Dan Marino for Pitt and Todd Blackledge for Penn State. Pitt went up 14–0 in the first quarter; Penn State tied it at 14 at the half. The second half belonged to Penn State, scoring 34 second-half points while holding the Panthers scoreless. The 48–14 final cost Pitt a chance for its second national title in five years.

The 1982 game again featured two of the nation's best teams. Pitt had been ranked preseason #1, but had lost to Notre Dame to enter the game at 9–1. Penn State also entered the game 9–1, having lost only to Alabama. Again, it would be Marino vs. Blackledge in their last regular season game at a windswept Beaver Stadium. Penn State prevailed 19–10 on the strength of one Blackledge touchdown pass to Kenny Jackson, four field goals and a tenacious defense, and was on its way to a Sugar Bowl upset of Georgia, earning its first National Championship.

The rivalry began a slow death in the 1990s when both schools left the ranks of college football independents and chose to join different conferences. Penn State accepted an invitation to join the Big Ten Conference while Pitt's football program joined the Big East Conference (who had rejected Penn State's application to join by a single vote in 1982) where the majority of the school's athletic programs already participated. The conference affiliations of the two previously independent football programs resulted in fewer scheduling opportunities.

The last game prior to the series hiatus was played at Three Rivers Stadium in Pittsburgh, on September 16, 2000, when Pitt shut out Penn State 12–0. The desire of the Penn State Athletic Department to host an unbalanced number of home games (proposing 2–1 and 3–2 series) at Beaver Stadium was a significant factor in not agreeing to renew the series. The basis for this request stemmed from the fact that of the 96 games played by the two teams at the time, only 23 occurred in Happy Valley.

During the years the rivalry was dormant, both schools went through a major transformation. At Pitt, the school's basketball program became more prominent at the expense of the football team, seen most notably by the placement of the Petersen Events Center in the footprint of old Pitt Stadium. While the football team's attendance remained comparable after moving to Heinz Field in 2001 (almost 45,500 at Pitt Stadium in its final years and almost 42,000 at Heinz Field), it often appears empty due to the venue's much higher capacity (56,500 at Pitt Stadium and 68,400 at Heinz Field). This became more pronounced after Pitt joined the Atlantic Coast Conference and especially after West Virginia University joined the Big 12 Conference, also putting the Backyard Brawl on hold. Meanwhile, the Penn State child sex abuse scandal was made public, leading to Pitt fans to chant "Joe Knew" as a reference to a reported news about longtime head coach Joe Paterno allegedly knowing about the allegations but not reporting it to police. This, as well as other general insults, has gained some controversy among sports fans, including Pitt students and alumni.

The rivalry was renewed after 16 years of dormancy for the 2016 season under the Keystone Classic moniker. This game was the first of a four-game series from 2016–19, with the teams playing at Heinz Field in Pittsburgh in 2016 and 2018, while battling at Beaver Stadium in State College in 2017 and 2019.

In 2016, Pitt went up 28–7 during the second quarter. Penn State rallied back during the second half, but was still down 42–39 late in the fourth quarter. In the final minutes, the Nittany Lions drove the ball almost within field goal range before going for a deep pass in the end zone. Quarterback Trace McSorley's pass was intercepted, effectively ending the game. The loss was cited as a key reason the Nittany Lions failed to make the College Football Playoff. This game became the largest attended sporting event in the history of the city of Pittsburgh.

In 2017, Penn State won by a score of 33–14. After going up early off the back of an opening-drive interception, the Nittany Lions never surrendered the lead. The recorded attendance was 109,898, the 10th-largest (seventh-largest at that time) ever at Beaver Stadium and the largest since 2009. This was also the largest crowd to ever attend a game in the series. The renewal has been highly successful, showcasing competitive games and setting major attendance records in its first two years.

In late April 2018, Pitt athletic director, Heather Lyke, was reported to have sent a proposal to her Penn State counterpart, Sandy Barbour, regarding a four-game series renewal in 2026. This would come after much discussion between both universities and athletic directors. As the Nittany Lions have yet to fill their non-conference Power Five slot for that season, this would be the first opportunity for the two to play again. However, a couple weeks later in May, Barbour stated that she had yet to sign the proposal, calling non-conference scheduling a “complicated puzzle.” Because of the Big Ten's nine conference games requirement, Penn State has a smaller degree of flexibility for scheduling compared to Pitt, as the ACC only has an eight conference game schedule. Barbour went on to say that both she and Lyke had agreed that the universities were unlikely to do something presently and that they were looking at post-2030 for a series renewal.

The 2018 game in Pittsburgh had long been rumored to be a nationally televised, prime time, night game. This was further supported when the Pittsburgh Pirates of the MLB changed the start time of their game at PNC Park on September 8 from 7:05 p.m. to 1:05 p.m. On May 16, Pitt and Penn State announced that the game would officially be played at night. In the rain and wind caused by the wake of Tropical Storm Gordon, Penn State prevailed 51–6. This was the first night game in the series since 1987.

In a game only fitting for their 100th meeting, Pitt and Penn State exchanged scores in the first half after a delay due to severe weather. After the Nittany Lions struck first with a touchdown in the first quarter, the Panthers answered with ten points in the second. In the waning seconds of the half, Penn State drove the ball into enemy territory and within field goal range. However, a sack by Pitt moved them back considerably to bring up fourth and long. With little chance of converting, the Nittany Lions elected to attempt a school record 57-yard field goal. Kicker Jordan Stout punched it through the middle of the uprights to tie the game going into halftime, breaking the record. The second half was marked with both big offensive breaks and strong defensive stands. Penn State notched the sole score of the third quarter to go up 17–10. However, after converting on multiple fourth downs and third and longs, the Panthers threatened to tie the game up late in the fourth quarter. With less than six and a half minutes remaining in the game, Pitt converted on 2nd and 19 to get the ball to the Penn State 1 yardline, almost scoring in the process. The Nittany Lions would hold the line and force 4th and 1 with less than five minutes left in the game. Pitt's head coach, Pat Narduzzi, controversially elected to attempt a 19-yard field goal. Kicker Alex Kessman, who had set a school record four 50+ yard field goals the season prior, kicked the ball off the left upright of the goalpost. The Panthers' defense would hold up the Nittany Lions on the ensuing drive once again, forcing them to punt and giving their offense one last chance to score. After starting on their own 16 yardline, Pitt drove the ball deep into enemy territory. After gaining a first down in the last few seconds, there was confusion over the game clock, which failed to stop for the ball to be set after the conversion. The clock would run out to 0, leading the Nittany Lions and most of Beaver Stadium to think the game was over. The officials were then forced to clear the teams off the field and back onto the sidelines, announcing the error over the speakers and asking for five seconds back on the clock. This would become six seconds, and later nine, after further review, leaving a confused crowd on the edge of their seats for one last play in regulation. Kenny Pickett's pass would fall incomplete, ending the game and the renewed series (for the time being) with a 17–10 Penn State victory.

== Game results ==
Penn State victories	Pittsburgh victories	Tie games

No.	Date	Location	Winning team		Losing team	
1	November 6, 1893	State College	Penn State	32	W.U.P.	0
2	October 3, 1896	State College	Penn State	10	W.U.P.	4
3	September 30, 1900	Bellefonte	Penn State	12	W.U.P.	0
4	September 29, 1901	Bellefonte	Penn State	27	W.U.P.	0
5	September 27, 1902	State College	Penn State	27	W.U.P.	0
6	October 24, 1903	Pittsburgh	Penn State	59	W.U.P.	0
7	November 24, 1904	Pittsburgh	W.U.P.	22	Penn State	5
8	November 30, 1905	Pittsburgh	Penn State	6	W.U.P.	0
9	November 29, 1906	Pittsburgh	Penn State	6	W.U.P.	0
10	November 28, 1907	Pittsburgh	W.U.P.	6	Penn State	0
11	November 26, 1908	Pittsburgh	Penn State	12	Pittsburgh	6
12	November 25, 1909	Pittsburgh	Penn State	5	Pittsburgh	0
13	November 24, 1910	Pittsburgh	Pittsburgh	11	Penn State	0
14	November 30, 1911	Pittsburgh	Penn State	3	Pittsburgh	0
15	November 28, 1912	Pittsburgh	Penn State	38	Pittsburgh	0
16	November 27, 1913	Pittsburgh	Pittsburgh	7	Penn State	6
17	November 26, 1914	Pittsburgh	Pittsburgh	13	Penn State	3
18	November 25, 1915	Pittsburgh	Pittsburgh	20	Penn State	0
19	November 30, 1916	Pittsburgh	Pittsburgh	31	Penn State	0
20	November 29, 1917	Pittsburgh	Pittsburgh	28	Penn State	6
21	November 28, 1918	Pittsburgh	Pittsburgh	28	Penn State	6
22	November 27, 1919	Pittsburgh	Penn State	20	Pittsburgh	0
23	November 25, 1920	Pittsburgh	Tie	0	Tie	0
24	November 24, 1921	Pittsburgh	Tie	0	Tie	0
25	November 30, 1922	Pittsburgh	Pittsburgh	14	Penn State	0
26	November 29, 1923	Pittsburgh	Pittsburgh	20	Penn State	3
27	November 27, 1924	Pittsburgh	Pittsburgh	24	Penn State	3
28	November 26, 1925	Pittsburgh	Pittsburgh	23	Penn State	7
29	November 25, 1926	Pittsburgh	Pittsburgh	24	Penn State	6
30	November 24, 1927	Pittsburgh	Pittsburgh	30	Penn State	0
31	November 29, 1928	Pittsburgh	Pittsburgh	26	Penn State	0
32	November 28, 1929	Pittsburgh	Pittsburgh	20	Penn State	7
33	November 26, 1930	Pittsburgh	Pittsburgh	19	Penn State	12
34	October 31, 1931	State College	Pittsburgh	41	Penn State	6
35	October 26, 1935	Pittsburgh	Pittsburgh	9	Penn State	0
36	November 7, 1936	Pittsburgh	#5 Pittsburgh	34	Penn State	7
37	November 20, 1937	Pittsburgh	#1 Pittsburgh	28	Penn State	7
38	November 19, 1938	Pittsburgh	#5 Pittsburgh	26	Penn State	0
39	November 25, 1939	State College	Penn State	10	Pittsburgh	0
40	November 23, 1940	Pittsburgh	Pittsburgh	20	Penn State	7
41	November 22, 1941	Pittsburgh	Penn State	31	Pittsburgh	7
42	November 21, 1942	State College	Penn State	14	Pittsburgh	6
43	November 20, 1943	Pittsburgh	Penn State	14	Pittsburgh	0
44	November 25, 1944	Pittsburgh	Pittsburgh	14	Penn State	0
45	November 24, 1945	Pittsburgh	Pittsburgh	7	Penn State	0
46	November 23, 1946	Pittsburgh	Pittsburgh	14	Penn State	7
47	November 22, 1947	Pittsburgh	#5 Penn State	29	Pittsburgh	0
48	November 20, 1948	Pittsburgh	Pittsburgh	7	#6 Penn State	0
49	November 19, 1949	Pittsburgh	Pittsburgh	19	Penn State	0
50	December 2, 1950	Pittsburgh	Penn State	21	Pittsburgh	20
51	November 24, 1951	Pittsburgh	Pittsburgh	13	Penn State	7

No.	Date	Location	Winning team		Losing team	
52	November 22, 1952	Pittsburgh	Penn State	17	#16 Pittsburgh	0
53	November 21, 1953	Pittsburgh	Penn State	17	Pittsburgh	0
54	November 20, 1954	Pittsburgh	Penn State	13	Pittsburgh	0
55	November 19, 1955	State College	#15 Pittsburgh	20	Penn State	0
56	November 24, 1956	Pittsburgh	Tie	7	Tie	7
57	November 23, 1957	Pittsburgh	Pittsburgh	14	Penn State	13
58	November 27, 1958	Pittsburgh	Penn State	25	#19 Pittsburgh	21
59	November 21, 1959	Pittsburgh	Pittsburgh	22	#7 Penn State	7
60	November 19, 1960	Pittsburgh	Penn State	14	Pittsburgh	3
61	November 25, 1961	Pittsburgh	Penn State	47	Pittsburgh	26
62	November 24, 1962	Pittsburgh	#9 Penn State	16	Pittsburgh	0
63	December 7, 1963	Pittsburgh	#4 Pittsburgh	22	Penn State	21
64	November 21, 1964	Pittsburgh	Penn State	28	Pittsburgh	0
65	November 20, 1965	Pittsburgh	Pittsburgh	30	Penn State	27
66	November 19, 1966	Pittsburgh	Penn State	48	Pittsburgh	24
67	November 25, 1967	State College	Penn State	42	Pittsburgh	6
68	November 23, 1968	Pittsburgh	#3 Penn State	65	Pittsburgh	9
69	November 22, 1969	Pittsburgh	#4 Penn State	27	Pittsburgh	7
70	November 21, 1970	State College	#20 Penn State	35	Pittsburgh	15
71	November 20, 1971	Pittsburgh	#6 Penn State	55	Pittsburgh	18
72	November 25, 1972	State College	#6 Penn State	49	Pittsburgh	27
73	November 24, 1973	State College	#6 Penn State	35	#20 Pittsburgh	13
74	November 28, 1974	Pittsburgh	#10 Penn State	31	#18 Pittsburgh	10
75	November 22, 1975	Pittsburgh	#10 Penn State	7	#17 Pittsburgh	6
76	November 26, 1976	Pittsburgh	#1 Pittsburgh	24	#16 Penn State	7
77	November 26, 1977	Pittsburgh	#9 Penn State	15	#10 Pittsburgh	13
78	November 24, 1978	State College	#1 Penn State	17	#15 Pittsburgh	10
79	December 1, 1979	State College	#11 Pittsburgh	29	#19 Penn State	14
80	November 28, 1980	State College	#4 Pittsburgh	14	#5 Penn State	9
81	November 28, 1981	Pittsburgh	#11 Penn State	48	#1 Pittsburgh	14
82	November 26, 1982	State College	#2 Penn State	19	#5 Pittsburgh	10
83	November 19, 1983	Pittsburgh	Tie	24	Tie	24
84	November 24, 1984	State College	Pittsburgh	31	Penn State	11
85	November 23, 1985	Pittsburgh	#1 Penn State	31	Pittsburgh	0
86	November 22, 1986	State College	#2 Penn State	34	Pittsburgh	14
87	November 14, 1987	Pittsburgh	Pittsburgh	10	#15 Penn State	0
88	November 12, 1988	State College	Pittsburgh	14	Penn State	7
89	November 25, 1989	Pittsburgh	#22 Penn State	16	#19 Pittsburgh	13
90	November 24, 1990	State College	#11 Penn State	22	Pittsburgh	17
91	November 28, 1991	Pittsburgh	#6 Penn State	32	Pittsburgh	20
92	November 21, 1992	State College	#23 Penn State	57	Pittsburgh	13
93	September 6, 1997	State College	#1 Penn State	34	Pittsburgh	17
94	September 19, 1998	Pittsburgh	#8 Penn State	20	Pittsburgh	13
95	September 11, 1999	State College	#2 Penn State	20	Pittsburgh	17
96	September 16, 2000	Pittsburgh	Pittsburgh	12	Penn State	0
97	September 10, 2016	Pittsburgh	Pittsburgh	42	Penn State	39
98	September 9, 2017	State College	#4 Penn State	33	Pittsburgh	14
99	September 8, 2018	Pittsburgh	#13 Penn State	51	Pittsburgh	6
100	September 14, 2019	State College	#13 Penn State	17	Pittsburgh	10
Series: Penn State leads 53–43–4

== See also ==
- List of NCAA college football rivalry games
- List of most-played college football series in NCAA Division I
