= Penn State–West Virginia football rivalry =

American college football rivalry

- Penn State Nittany Lions West Virginia Mountaineers
- First meeting: October 15, 1904
- Latest meeting: August 31, 2024
- Next meeting: TBA

Statistics
- Total meetings: 61
- All-time series: Penn State leads, 50–9–2
- Largest victory: Penn State, 51–6 (1991)
- Longest win streak: Penn State, 25 (1959–1983)
- Current win streak: Penn State, 6 (1989–present)

Locations of Penn State and West Virginia

The Penn State–West Virginia football rivalry is an American college football rivalry between the Penn State Nittany Lions and West Virginia Mountaineers. Penn State leads the series 50–9–2.

Penn State and West Virginia have met 61 times, the third-highest number of meetings for a Nittany Lion opponent, trailing only the Pittsburgh Panthers (100) and Syracuse Orange (71). The Nittany Lions and Mountaineers first met in 1904 and played every season from 1947 to 1992 (46 consecutive games), with the series ending in 1993 after Penn State and West Virginia joined the Big Ten and Big East Conferences, respectively.

== Series history ==
In 1904, 1905, 1906, 1908, and 1909, West Virginia went to State College to face Penn State. They were shut out each time. They met again at Yankee Stadium in 1923, where the result was a 13–13 tie.

In 1925, the first game in Morgantown took place. It was also West Virginia's first win, 14–0. The next game was also played at Morgantown in 1931, resulting in another Mountaineer victory. The next game was played at Penn State in 1940, a Nittany Lion victory. In 1941, the Lions won again 7–0.

In 1942, West Virginia won at home 24–0. Penn State won in 1943 32–7, but West Virginia won 28–27 at home in 1944. Penn State won the next six.

Starting in 1904, the schools were considered as part of the "tri-state district Big Three" alongside Pittsburgh and competed for the "district Big Three championship" annually, a distinction earned by attaining the best record against the other two. This became an annual round-robin and in 1951 the Old Ironsides Trophy was introduced and awarded to the champion of the three. The trio played annually until West Virginia won its second outright title in 1984 and Penn State was unable to locate the trophy. With the loss of the trophy and deregionalization of college football, the three-team rivalry increasingly became three distinct head-to-head matchups with little to no connection.

In 1953 and 1954, West Virginia upset Penn State at New Beaver Field 20–19 and 19–14. In 1955 West Virginia won at home 21–7. From 1956–83, Penn State went 27–0–1. They had consecutive victories over some of West Virginia's greatest quarterbacks, such as Oliver Luck and Penn State-transfer Jeff Hostetler. Joe Paterno also became coach of Penn State in 1967, while Don Nehlen became West Virginia's coach in 1980.

In 1984, West Virginia won for the first time since 1955 in Morgantown, with a 17–14 upset. However, Penn State won the next three. In 1988, under Major Harris' lead, West Virginia won 51–30, en route to an undefeated regular season, making them the only team to score more than 50 points on any Joe Paterno coached Penn State squad. Penn State followed up by winning the last four.

The schools announced on September 19, 2013, that they would renew the series with two games in 2023 and 2024, one each in State College and Morgantown. Penn State won both of these games 38–15 and 34–12, respectively.

== Game results ==
Penn State victories	West Virginia victories	Tie games

No.	Date	Location	Winner	Score
1	October 15, 1904	State College, PA	Penn State	34–0
2	November 25, 1905	State College, PA	Penn State	6–0
3	November 23, 1906	State College, PA	Penn State	11–0
4	October 24, 1908	State College, PA	Penn State	12–0
5	November 13, 1909	State College, PA	Penn State	40–0
6	October 27, 1923	New York, NY	Tie	13–13
7	November 14, 1925	Morgantown, WV	West Virginia	14–0
8	November 21, 1931	Morgantown, WV	West Virginia	19–0
9	October 12, 1940	State College, PA	Penn State	17–13
10	November 15, 1941	State College, PA	Penn State	7–0
11	October 31, 1942	Morgantown, WV	West Virginia	24–0
12	October 30, 1943	State College, PA	Penn State	32–7
13	October 28, 1944	Morgantown, WV	West Virginia	28–27
14	October 25, 1947	State College, PA	#9 Penn State	21–14
15	October 16, 1948	State College, PA	#9 Penn State	37–7
16	November 5, 1949	Morgantown, WV	Penn State	34–14
17	November 11, 1950	State College, PA	Penn State	27–0
18	October 27, 1951	State College, PA	Penn State	13–7
19	October 11, 1952	Morgantown, WV	#20 Penn State	35–21
20	October 31, 1953	State College, PA	West Virginia	20–19
21	October 16, 1954	State College, PA	#14 West Virginia	19–14
22	October 22, 1955	Morgantown, WV	#8 West Virginia	21–7
23	October 27, 1956	State College, PA	#18 Penn State	16–6
24	November 2, 1957	State College, PA	Penn State	27–6
25	November 8, 1958	Morgantown, WV	Tie	14–14
26	October 31, 1959	Morgantown, WV	#7 Penn State	28–10
27	October 29, 1960	State College, PA	Penn State	34–13
28	November 11, 1961	Morgantown, WV	Penn State	20–6
29	November 10, 1962	State College, PA	Penn State	34–6
30	October 26, 1963	State College, PA	Penn State	20–9
31	October 24, 1964	Morgantown, WV	Penn State	37–8

No.	Date	Location	Winner	Score
32	October 23, 1965	State College, PA	Penn State	44–6
33	October 22, 1966	Morgantown, WV	Penn State	38–6
34	October 21, 1967	State College, PA	Penn State	21–14
35	October 5, 1968	Morgantown, WV	#3 Penn State	31–20
36	October 11, 1969	State College, PA	#5 Penn State	20–0
37	October 31, 1970	State College, PA	Penn State	42–8
38	October 30, 1971	Morgantown, WV	#6 Penn State	35–7
39	October 28, 1972	Morgantown, WV	#11 Penn State	28–19
40	October 27, 1973	State College, PA	#5 Penn State	62–14
41	October 26, 1974	Morgantown, WV	#10 Penn State	21–12
42	October 11, 1975	State College, PA	#10 Penn State	39–0
43	October 23, 1976	Morgantown, WV	Penn State	33–0
44	October 22, 1977	State College, PA	#10 Penn State	49–28
45	October 29, 1978	Morgantown, WV	#2 Penn State	49–21
46	October 27, 1979	State College, PA	Penn State	31–6
47	October 25, 1980	Morgantown, WV	#13 Penn State	20–15
48	October 24, 1981	State College, PA	#1 Penn State	30–7
49	October 23, 1982	Morgantown, WV	#9 Penn State	24–0
50	October 22, 1983	State College, PA	Penn State	41–23
51	October 27, 1984	Morgantown, WV	#18 West Virginia	17–14
52	October 26, 1985	State College, PA	#3 Penn State	27–0
53	November 1, 1986	Morgantown, WV	#2 Penn State	19–0
54	October 31, 1987	State College, PA	#18 Penn State	25–21
55	October 29, 1988	Morgantown, WV	#7 West Virginia	51–30
56	November 4, 1989	State College, PA	#16 Penn State	19–9
57	November 3, 1990	Morgantown, WV	#24 Penn State	31–19
58	October 26, 1991	State College, PA	#8 Penn State	51–6
59	October 24, 1992	Morgantown, WV	#14 Penn State	40–26
60	September 2, 2023	State College, PA	#7 Penn State	38–15
61	August 31, 2024	Morgantown, WV	#8 Penn State	34–12
Series: Penn State leads 50–9–2

== See also ==
- List of NCAA college football rivalry games
