= Old Ironsides (trophy) =

Three-way American college football rivalry

- Tri-State Big Three
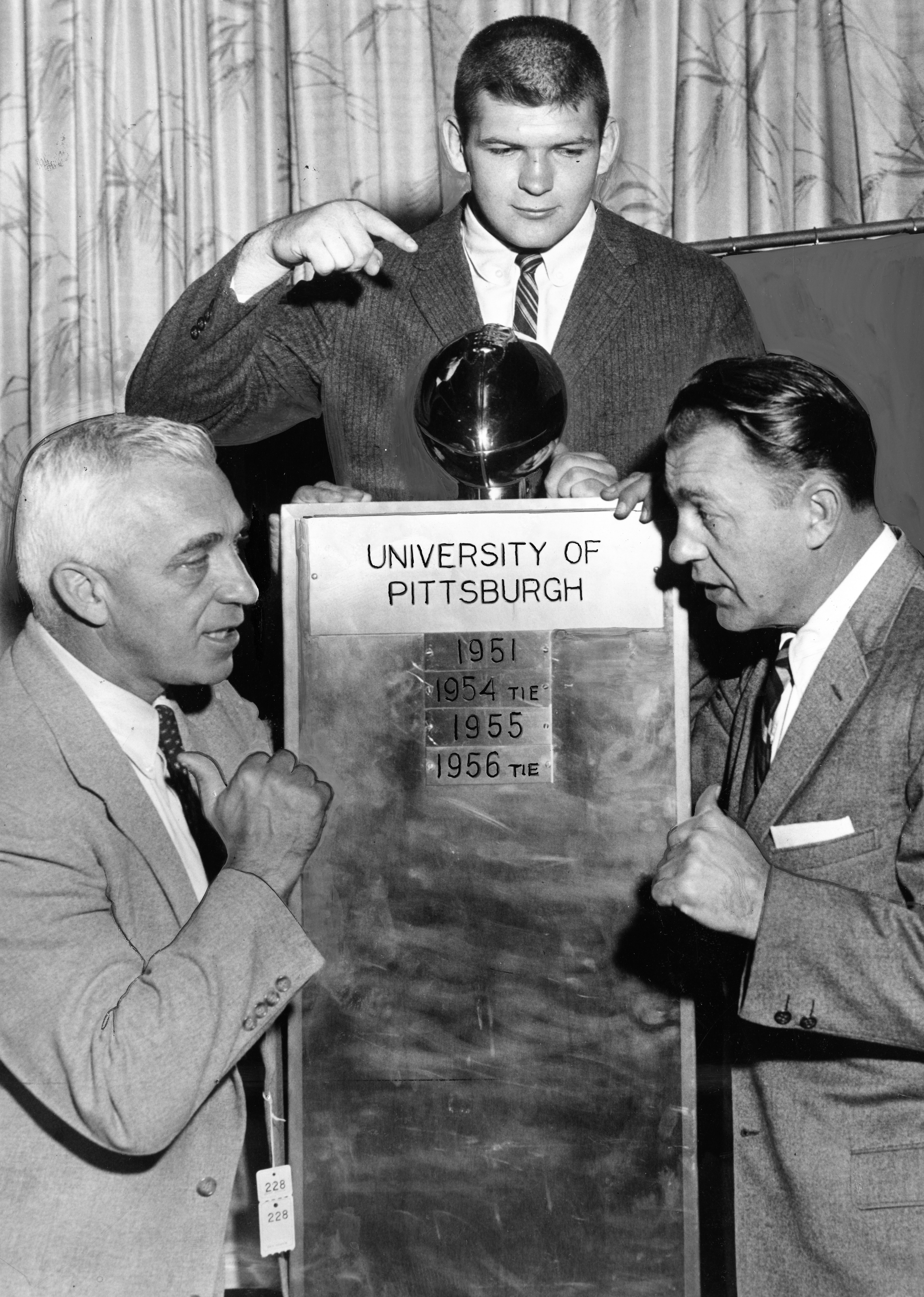

Penn State Nittany Lions	Pittsburgh Panthers	West Virginia Mountaineers
- Trophy: Old Ironsides (1951–84)
- First qualifying year: 1900
- First full round-robin: 1904
- Longest streak: Penn State (1966–75)
- Latest champion: Penn State (2023)*
- District Championships
Penn State (12); 1901 1905; 1906 1908; 1909 1919; 1939 1941; 1942 1943; 1947 1950	Pitt (24); 1904 1907; 1910 1913; 1917 1920; 1921 1924; 1925 1926; 1927 1929; 1930 1931; 1935 1936; 1937 1938; 1940 1944; 1945 1946; 1948 1949	WVU (2); 1922 1928
- Outright trophy victories
Penn State (21); 1952 1958; 1960 1961; 1962 1964; 1966 1967; 1968 1969; 1970 1971; 1972 1973; 1974 1975; 1977 1978; 1981 1982; 1983	Pitt (6); 1951 1955; 1963 1976; 1979 1980	WVU (2); 1953 1984
- *No official champions have been crowned since 1984

University locations
Locations of Penn State, Pitt, & WVU

Old Ironsides was the trophy awarded for the three-way college football rivalry between the Penn State Nittany Lions, the Pittsburgh Panthers, and the West Virginia Mountaineers. Although Old Ironsides is the most distinctive aspect of the rivalry, the trophy was long predated by the significance of the universities' collegiate football matches.

In 1984, staff from the Penn State Athletics Department informed their counterparts at Pittsburgh and West Virginia that the trophy went missing at some point while in Penn State's possession. The resulting searches yielded no trace and the Old Ironsides trophy was lost.

As a result of the reduced frequency of competitions between the schools and the disappearance of Old Ironsides, the triangular rivalry is largely viewed in the scope of the individual head-to-head rivalries and not a unified competition between all three.

The three schools were often referred to as the "Tri-State Big Three" or simply the "Big Three". This naming both predated and coexisted with the Old Ironsides trophy. Prior to and concurrent with the attached trophy, the winner of the triangular rivalry was named the "district Big Three champion".

== Series history ==
=== District championship era (1881–1950) ===
In 1881, Pennsylvania State College played its first collegiate game against Lewisburg where they won 9–0. This was the first team fielded by any of the Big Three. The Western University of Pennsylvania (WUP) introduced football in 1890 and West Virginia University introduced football in 1891.

The first game played between any of the three was on November 6, 1893, when Penn State defeated WUP 32–0. The rivalry between the three schools rapidly formed as Pittsburgh, then WUP, regularly battled West Virginia and Penn State, who played an imbalanced series in Pittsburgh. Notably, Penn State versus West Virginia became an extremely heated rivalry as the two met in 1904, 1905, 1906, 1908, and 1909 in State College. WVU was shut out each time. They met again at Yankee Stadium in 1923. The result was a 13–13 tie.

In 1900, the first rivalry qualifying season took place as Western University played both Penn State and West Virginia. Western University lost both matchups, making the first result a split championship between Penn State and West Virginia.

In 1904, the first full round-robin took place, meaning each of the three teams played both of the others. West Virginia went 0–2 in the rivalry, Penn State went 1–1, and Western went 2–0 as part of their undefeated 1904 campaign. By 1908, the battle between the three was considered a championship and representative of supremacy in Western Pennsylvania and West Virginia and a 1921 article from The Pittsburg Press referred to a triangular rivalry between the schools as they competed for the "sectional title". By the 1930s, the trio was simply referred to as "the east's Big Three"

Over time, Central and Western Pennsylvania, West Virginia, and eastern Ohio became considered the Tri-State district for college athletics. Pittsburgh (formerly WUP), Penn State, and West Virginia were the district's powerhouses and the title of "Big Three" was synonymous with their dominance of the district's less prominent collegiate teams: the "Little 15" also sometimes called "West Penn Class B" and annual battles for the "district championship".

Local newspapers frequently included a spot in the sports section of their daily paper which included the overall and head-to-head records of the Big Three and Little 15/West Penn Class B. The two groups were also sometimes referred to as the "Tri-State Big Three Conference" and "West Penn Class B Conference" respectively.

The Tri-State district also included a scoring title awarded to the player from a Big Three school with the most points scored over the course of a given season.

The district title or district championship was not replaced by the Old Ironsides trophy, although it was eventually pushed out of relevance in favor of the battle for the trophy. The title coexisted with the trophy for years as a distinct rivalry and competition.

=== Old Ironsides trophy era (1951–1984) ===
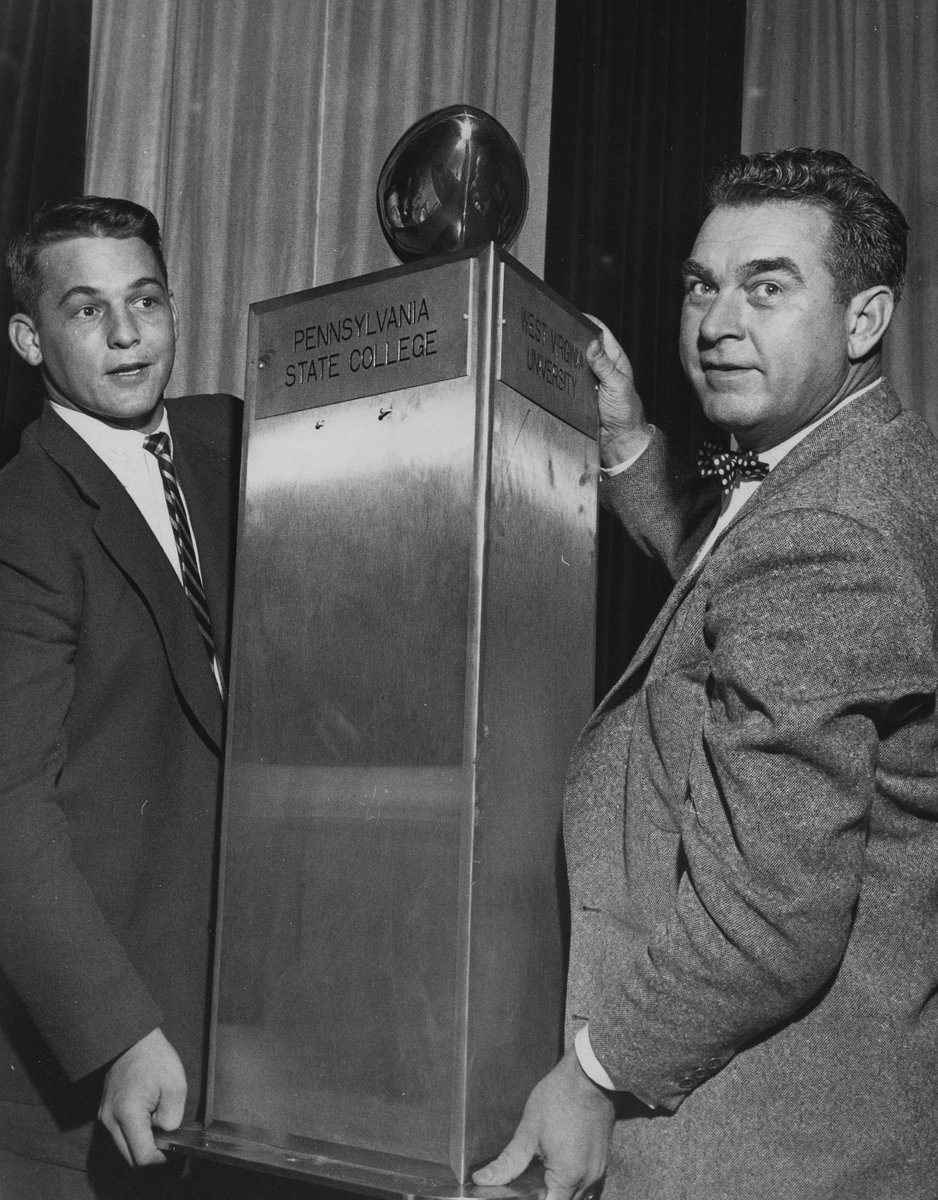
Bob Orders (left) and Art "Pappy" Lewis (right) holding the large, 3-sided Old Ironsides trophy

The Old Ironsides trophy was introduced to the Big Three championship in 1951 by the Pittsburgh Junior Chamber of Commerce to be given to the winner of the round robin. Upon its introduction it was believed to be the heaviest trophy in the world at 150 pounds, although some sources place the trophy at 200 pounds. The 4 foot tall trophy consists of a 3 foot tall stainless steel triangular prism mounted onto a one-inch thick stainless steel triangular base. On each side of the trophy is a plaque at the top of the trophy's body. Each plaque represents one of the three schools as their name appeared at the time of the trophy's introduction (Pennsylvania State College became Pennsylvania State University in 1953). Smaller plaques were annually placed underneath the large plaque to mark years in which the team had had a shared result or an outright victory. Atop the pillar sits a "nearly regulation sized" football presumably also made of stainless steel.

The trophy was traditionally awarded to the victorious team's head coach, or a chosen position coach in the case of then Penn State quarterbacks coach Joe Paterno following the 1964 season, at the annual Pittsburgh Junior Chamber of Commerce banquet or Curbstone Coaches awards banquet in the Roosevelt Hotel or the Sherwyn Hotel. The Roosevelt Hotel has since been repurposed a high-rise apartment complex called "The Roosevelt Building" and the Sherwyn Hotel is now Point Park University's Lawrence Hall. There is also at least one instance of the presentation taking place at the weekly Junior Chamber of Commerce luncheon in the Old Vienna Restaurant.

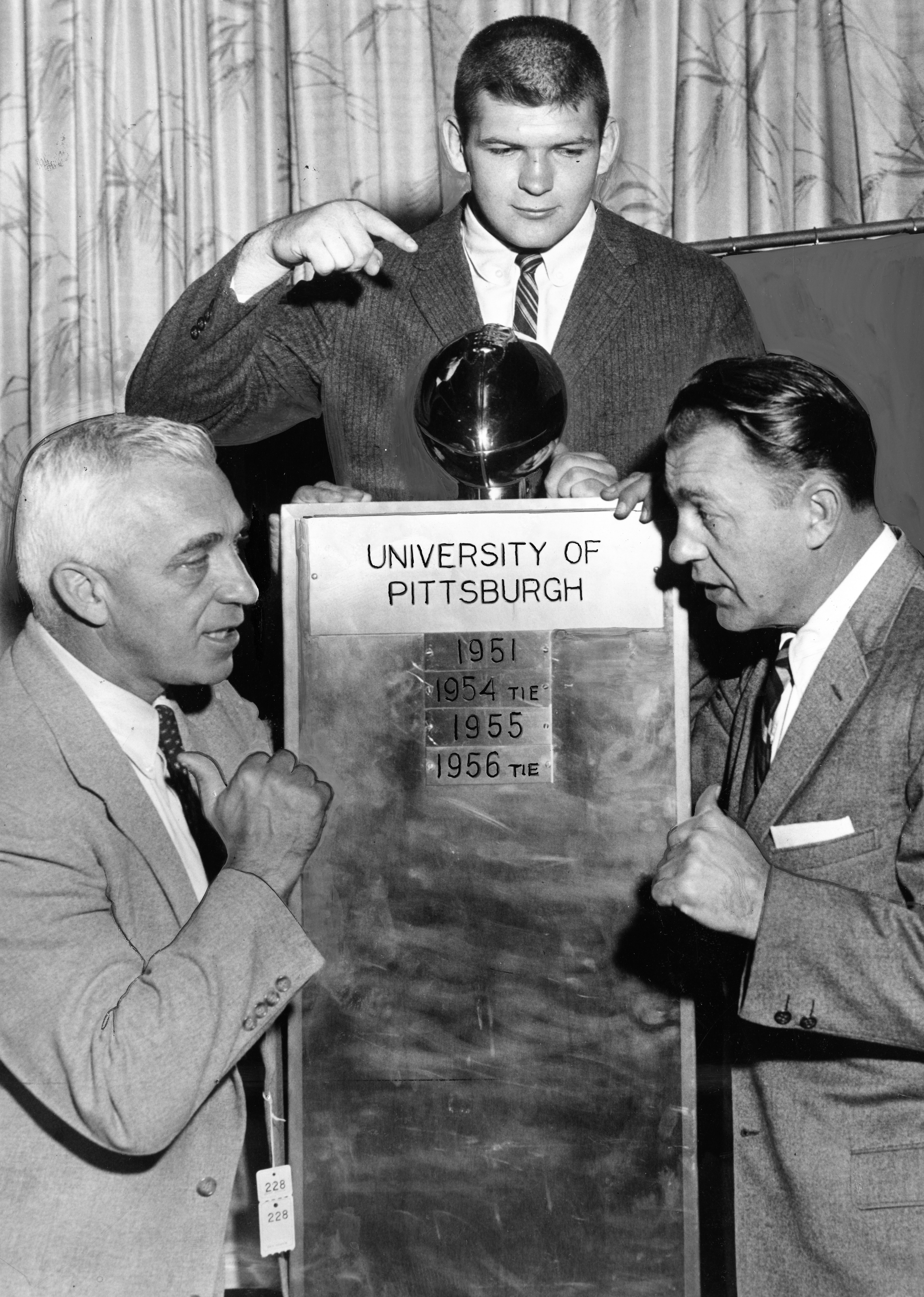
The trophy in 1958 with victory plaques shown. Left to right: Penn State Coach Rip Engle, Pitt Co-Captain Don Crafton, Pitt Coach John Michelosen.

During the 1952 season, the trophy was presented by former Pitt halfback Emil Narick to The University of Pittsburgh's athletic director Tom Hamilton. Hamilton was head coach for the Panthers in their 1951 season during which Pitt defeated both Penn State and West Virginia, thus winning the first year of competition for Old Ironsides. Unlike subsequent seasons, the inaugural presentation of the trophy was done during halftime of that season's Backyard Brawl prior to the universities' marching bands taking the field. West Virginia went on to win that game 16–0.

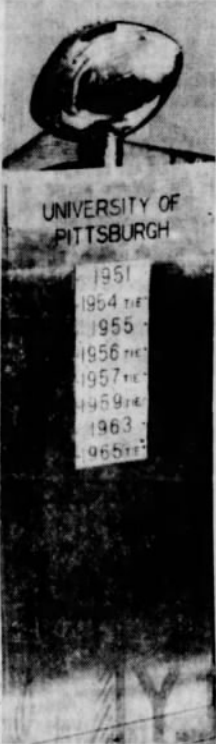
The trophy in 1966

From its inception the trophy was met with little fanfare from fans or media. Coverage of the trophy largely novelty; the mentions focused on its size and weight, in particular the difficulty of transporting the trophy. There was little to no coverage outside of the tri-state area and within ten years of the trophy's use, the originator of the idea was unknown. Despite all this, the teams and coaches turned out to the annual ceremonies awarding the victor and fought for possession of the monolith.

A 1975 article in Penn State's Daily Collegian student newspaper reported that the trophy had sat in "its homely location between the men's and women's rooms in the upstairs hallway of Rec Hall for 10 years." The trophy had not been updated since 1970 and the article describes the trophy's poor condition in minor detail.

The Pittsburgh Junior Chamber of Commerce sponsored Old Ironsides at its introduction and in each year it was officially presented. Additionally, the "Jaycees" as they are called were also tasked with organizing the presentation until the ceremony was handed off to the Curbstone Coaches. From the conclusion of the 1981 season through the 1983 season, Penn State retained possession of the trophy. When the West Virginia Department of Athletics requested the trophy be handed over by Penn State in 1984, a search of their office and museum proved fruitless. Similar searches by The University of Pittsburgh and West Virginia University also yielded no trophy. Since then, there have been no public efforts to locate the trophy.

The fate of the Old Ironsides trophy is unknown.

== Champions ==
In seasons where all three clubs competed against at least one of the others, the team with the best head-to-head record is dubbed the champion. From 1951 to 1984, the Old Ironsides trophy was awarded to the winner of the round-robin between Penn State, Pittsburgh, and West Virginia. In cases where there is no single best record the trophy was retained by the previous winner, though trophy retention is not equated with outright championships. There was no official method of tiebreaking,* so in rivalry-qualifying years (seasons where each club plays at least one in-rivalry game) which end with a two or three-way tie it is ruled a split championship. Win counts were frequently counted in total seasons with at least a share of the trophy.

Prior to the introduction of the Old Ironsides trophy, there were no split championships. If no team possessed an outright superior record in a qualifying season, no champion was named and no shares or claims were recognized.

* Apparent exceptions to tiebreaking, trophy retention, and split championships do exist. Note that in 1959 each team ended 1–1 in-rivalry but the trophy was reported by one source as being awarded to Pittsburgh, however the trophy remained at Penn State during that time implying retention. That season is considered a split championship in record keeping.

**Penn State victories**	**Pittsburgh victories**	**West Virginia victories**	**Tied results**	**No game played**

=== District championship era (1881–1950) ===
Only seasons with at least one district game shown

Season	championship winner	Penn State – Pittsburgh score	Pittsburgh – West Virginia score	West Virginia – Penn State score
1893		Penn State 32–0		
1895			West Virginia 8–0	
1896		Penn State 10–4		
1898			West Virginia 5–0	
1900	Tie	Penn State 12–0	West Virginia 6–5	
1901	**Penn State**(1)	Penn State 37–0	WUP 12–0	
1902	Tie	Penn State 27–0	West Virginia 23–6	
1903	Tie	Penn State 59–0	West Virginia 24–6	
1904	**Western University**(1)	WUP 22–5	WUP 53–0	Penn State 34–0
1905	**Penn State**(2)	Penn State 6–0		Penn State 6–0
1906	**Penn State**(3)	Penn State 6–0	WUP 17–0	Penn State 11–0
1907	**Western University**(2)	WUP 6–0	WUP 10–0	
1908	**Penn State**(4)	Penn State 12–6	Pittsburgh 11–0	Penn State 12–0
1909	**Penn State**(5)	Penn State 5–0	Tie 0–0	Penn State 40–0
1910	**Pittsburgh**(3)	Pittsburgh 11–0	Pittsburgh 38–0	
1911		Penn State 3–0		
1912		Penn State 38–0		
1913	**Pittsburgh**(4)	Pittsburgh 7–6	Pittsburgh 40–0	
1914		Pittsburgh 13–3		
1915		Pittsburgh 20–0		
1916		Pittsburgh 31–0		
1917	**Pittsburgh**(5)	Pittsburgh 28–6	Pittsburgh 14–9	
1918		Pittsburgh 28–6		
1919	**Penn State**(6)	Penn State 20–0	Pittsburgh 26–0	
1920	**Pittsburgh**(6)	Tie 0–0	Pittsburgh 34–13	
1921	**Pittsburgh**(7)	Tie 0–0	Pittsburgh 21–13	
1922	**West Virginia**(1)	Pittsburgh 14–0	West Virginia 9–6	
1923	Tie	Pittsburgh 20–3	West Virginia 13–7	Tie 13–13
1924	**Pittsburgh**(8)	Pittsburgh 24–3	Pittsburgh 14–7	
1925	**Pittsburgh**(9)	Pittsburgh 23–7	Pittsburgh 15–7	West Virginia 14–0
1926	**Pittsburgh**(10)	Pittsburgh 24–6	Pittsburgh 17–7	
1927	**Pittsburgh**(11)	Pittsburgh 30–0	Pittsburgh 40–0	
1928	**West Virginia**(2)	Pittsburgh 26–0	West Virginia 9–6	
1929	**Pittsburgh**(12)	Pittsburgh 20–7	Pittsburgh 27–7	
1930	**Pittsburgh**(13)	Pittsburgh 19–12	Pittsburgh 16–0	
1931	**Pittsburgh**(14)	Pittsburgh 41–6	Pittsburgh 34–0	West Virginia 19–0
1932			Pittsburgh 40–0	
1933			Pittsburgh 21–0	
1934			Pittsburgh 27–6	
1935	**Pittsburgh**(15)	Pittsburgh 9–0	Pittsburgh 24–6	
1936	**Pittsburgh**(16)	Pittsburgh 34–7	Pittsburgh 34–0	
1937	**Pittsburgh**(17)	Pittsburgh 28–7	Pittsburgh 20–0	
1938	**Pittsburgh**(18)	Pittsburgh 26–0	Pittsburgh 19–0	
1939	**Penn State**(7)	Penn State 10–0	Pittsburgh 20–0	
1940	**Pittsburgh**(19)	Pittsburgh 20–7		Penn State 17–13
1941	**Penn State**(8)	Penn State 31–7		Penn State 7–0
1942	**Penn State**(9)	Penn State 14–6		Penn State 24–0
1943	**Penn State**(10)	Penn State 14–0	Pittsburgh 20–0	Penn State 32–7
1944	**Pittsburgh**(20)	Pittsburgh 14–0	Pittsburgh 26–13	West Virginia 28–27
1945	**Pittsburgh**(21)	Pittsburgh 7–0	Pittsburgh 20–0	
1946	**Pittsburgh**(22)	Pittsburgh 14–7	Pittsburgh 33–7	
1947	**Penn State**(11)	Penn State 29–0	West Virginia 17–2	Penn State 21–14
1948	**Pittsburgh**(23)	Pittsburgh 7–0	Pittsburgh 16–6	Penn State 37–7
1949	**Pittsburgh**(24)	Pittsburgh 19–0	Pittsburgh 20–7	Penn State 34–14
1950	**Penn State**(12)	Penn State 21–20	Pittsburgh 21–7	Penn State 27–0
Season	Trophy winner	Penn State – Pittsburgh score	Pittsburgh – West Virginia score	West Virginia – Penn State score
Championship era head-to-head records		**Pittsburgh 29–19–2**	**Pittsburgh 33–9–1**	**Penn State 13–3–1**

==== Team statistics in championship years (1881–1950) ====
	University of Pittsburgh	Penn State University	West Virginia University
District championships	**24**	12	2
Total in-rivalry records	**62–28–3**	32–22–3	12–46–2
Bold indicates best team

=== Old Ironsides trophy era seasons (1951–1984) ===
Season	Trophy winner	Penn State – Pittsburgh score	Pittsburgh – West Virginia score	West Virginia – Penn State score
1951	**Pittsburgh**(1)	Pittsburgh 13–7	Pittsburgh 32–12	Penn State 13–7
1952	**Penn State**(1)	Penn State 17–0	West Virginia 16–0	Penn State 35–21
1953	**West Virginia**(1)	Penn State 17–0	West Virginia 17–7	West Virginia 20–19
1954	PSU/Pitt/WVU, WVU retains	Penn State 13–0	Pittsburgh 13–10	West Virginia 19–14
1955	**Pittsburgh**(2)	Pittsburgh 20–0	Pittsburgh 26–7	West Virginia 21–7
1956	PSU/Pitt, Pitt retains	Tie 7–7	Pittsburgh 14–13	Penn State 16–6
1957	PSU/Pitt/WVU, Pitt retains	Pittsburgh 14–13	West Virginia 7–6	Penn State 27–6
1958	**Penn State**(2)	Penn State 25–21	Pittsburgh 15–8	Tie 14–14
1959	PSU/Pitt/WVU, PSU retains	Pittsburgh 22–7	West Virginia 23–15	Penn State 28–10
1960	**Penn State**(3)	Penn State 14–3	Pittsburgh 42–0	Penn State 34–13
1961	**Penn State**(4)	Penn State 47–26	West Virginia 20–6	Penn State 20–6
1962	**Penn State**(5)	Penn State 16–0	West Virginia 15–8	Penn State 34–6
1963	**Pittsburgh**(3)	Pittsburgh 22–21	Pittsburgh 13–10	Penn State 20–9
1964	**Penn State**(6)	Penn State 28–0	Pittsburgh 14–0	Penn State 37–8
1965	PSU/Pitt/WVU, PSU retains	Pittsburgh 30–27	West Virginia 63–48	Penn State 44–6
1966	**Penn State**(7)	Penn State 48–24	Pittsburgh 17–14	Penn State 38–6
1967	**Penn State**(8)	Penn State 42–6	West Virginia 15–0	Penn State 21–14
1968	**Penn State**(9)	Penn State 65–9	West Virginia 38–15	Penn State 31–20
1969	**Penn State**(10)	Penn State 27–7	West Virginia 49–18	Penn State 20–0
1970	**Penn State**(11)	Penn State 35–15	Pittsburgh 36–35	Penn State 42–8
1971	**Penn State**(12)	Penn State 55–18	West Virginia 20–9	Penn State 35–7
1972	**Penn State**(13)	Penn State 49–27	West Virginia 38–20	Penn State 28–19
1973	**Penn State**(14)	Penn State 35–13	Pittsburgh 35–7	Penn State 62–14
1974	**Penn State**(15)	Penn State 31–10	Pittsburgh 31–14	Penn State 21–12
1975	**Penn State**(16)	Penn State 7–6	West Virginia 17–14	Penn State 39–0
1976	**Pittsburgh**(4)	Pittsburgh 24–7	Pittsburgh 24–16	Penn State 33–0
1977	**Penn State**(17)	Penn State 15–13	Pittsburgh 44–3	Penn State 49–28
1978	**Penn State**(18)	Penn State 17–10	Pittsburgh 52–7	Penn State 49–21
1979	**Pittsburgh**(5)	Pittsburgh 29–14	Pittsburgh 24–17	Penn State 31–6
1980	**Pittsburgh**(6)	Pittsburgh 14–9	Pittsburgh 41–14	Penn State 20–15
1981	**Penn State**(19)	Penn State 48–14	Pittsburgh 17–0	Penn State 30–7
1982	**Penn State**(20)	Penn State 19–10	Pittsburgh 16–13	Penn State 24–0
1983	**Penn State**(21)	Tie 24–24	West Virginia 24–21	Penn State 41–23
1984	**West Virginia**(2)	Pittsburgh 31–11	West Virginia 28–10	West Virginia 17–14
Season	Trophy winner	Penn State – Pittsburgh score	Pittsburgh – West Virginia score	West Virginia – Penn State score
Trophy era head-to-head records		**Penn State 22–10–2**	**Pittsburgh 19–15–0**	**Penn State 29–4–1**

==== Team statistics in trophy years (1951–1984) ====
	University of Pittsburgh	Penn State University	West Virginia University
Total trophy shares	11	**26**	6
Outright trophy victories	6	**21**	2
Seasons with trophy possession	8	**23**	3
Total in-rivalry records	29–37–2	**51–14–3**	19–48–1
Bold indicates best team

== See also ==
- Backyard Brawl
- Penn State–Pittsburgh football rivalry
- Penn State–West Virginia football rivalry
- List of NCAA college football rivalry games
