= Alabama–Vanderbilt football rivalry =

American college football rivalry

- Alabama Crimson Tide Vanderbilt Commodores
- First meeting: October 10, 1903; Vanderbilt, 30–0
- Latest meeting: November 14, 2026; Alabama, 21–6
- Next meeting: 2028

Statistics
- Total meetings: 88
- All-time series: 62–20–4; Alabama leads 65–19–4 on the field, but three wins were vacated or forfeited.
- Largest victory: Vanderbilt, 78–0 (1906)
- Longest win streak: Alabama, 14 (1970–1983)
- Current win streak: Alabama, 2 (2025–present)

The Alabama–Vanderbilt football rivalry is an American college football rivalry between the Alabama Crimson Tide and Vanderbilt Commodores. Both universities are founding members of the Southeastern Conference (SEC) and Southern Conference (SoCon), and Southern Intercollegiate Athletic Association (SIAA). Alabama leads the series all time 62–20–4.

== History ==
=== McGugin and Wade ===
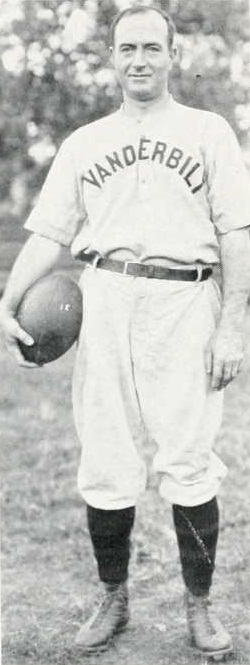
Dan McGugin in 1921

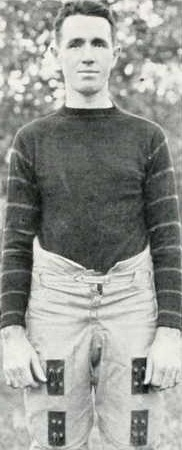
Wallace Wade at Vanderbilt, 1921

Vanderbilt Hall of Fame coach Dan McGugin had Wallace Wade as his assistant coach during undefeated seasons in 1921 and 1922, before Wade went on to success at Alabama, guiding the first Southern team to win a Rose Bowl in 1925, and winning two further national championships in 1926 and 1930.

== Notable games ==
=== 1903: First meeting ===
The first meeting between the two schools saw the new rule allowing the center to pass the ball to another running back instead of the quarterback. Vanderbilt outweighed the Alabamans by 15 pounds to the man and beat them 30–0 at Curry Field. Frank Kyle starred with runs of 35, 30, 50, and 48 yards.

Vanderbilt took a 12–0 halftime lead after first half touchdowns were scored first by Ed Hamilton and followed by John J. Tigert. The Commodores then closed the game with three touchdowns in the second half scored by Hamilton, Dan Blake and Bob Blake for the 30–0 victory. Tigert converted all five PAT's in their victory.

=== 1905: Haygood preserves shutout ===
The SIAA champion 1905 Vanderbilt team had no Southern team score on them until the final week of the season when Sewanee scored 4, and beat Alabama 34–0. Alabama running back Auxford Burks once broke free for what seemed like a touchdown, but was caught from behind by Vanderbilt's Jimmy Haygood. Vandy running back Honus Craig was the star of the game. Vanderbilt quarterback Frank Kyle was severely injured, knocked unconscious and taken to the hospital.

=== 1906: Vanderbilt wallops Alabama 78–0 ===
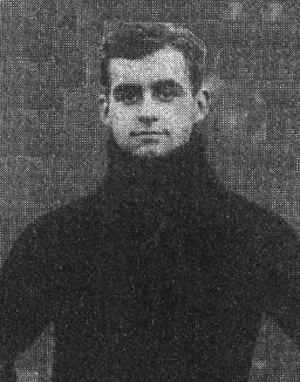
Owsley Manier scored five touchdowns on Alabama in 1906.

The SIAA champion 1906 Vanderbilt team was one of the South's greatest early teams, giving Alabama its only loss of the season by the worst margin in the history of the rivalry, 78–0. Seven of Alabama's regular players were out with injuries, and Vanderbilt executed several onside kicks from scrimmage. Owsley Manier scored five touchdowns as: "the back field frequently went twenty-five or thirty yards over the line". Alabama was held to just a single first down. Due to injuries, Alabama had not wished to play, and: "the comparatively few who came to see them play were scarcely rewarded by seeing touchdowns made every two minutes."

=== 1917: Goal line stand preserves Vandy win ===
Vanderbilt was coming off the worst defeat in school history, 83–0 by national champion Georgia Tech. Coach McGugin never stopped trying to keep his men "up". As fullback Top Richardson sat on the bench, McGugin shouted at him to "hit hard on every play." "Yes, sir!" Richardson replied, "I'll knock hell out of anyone who comes near this bench!"

Vanderbilt defeated Alabama 7–2, preserved with a goal line stand. The offensive play of the game was a 20-yard run by Richardson to set up a Gink Hendrick score. "The crowd on hand gasped as Richardson gobbled up the oval, ducked his head, and started down the field."

=== 1919: Cody and Stephenson duel, Alabama loses on fumbles ===
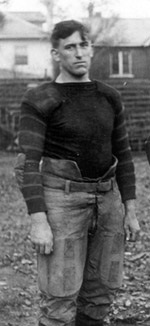
Josh Cody

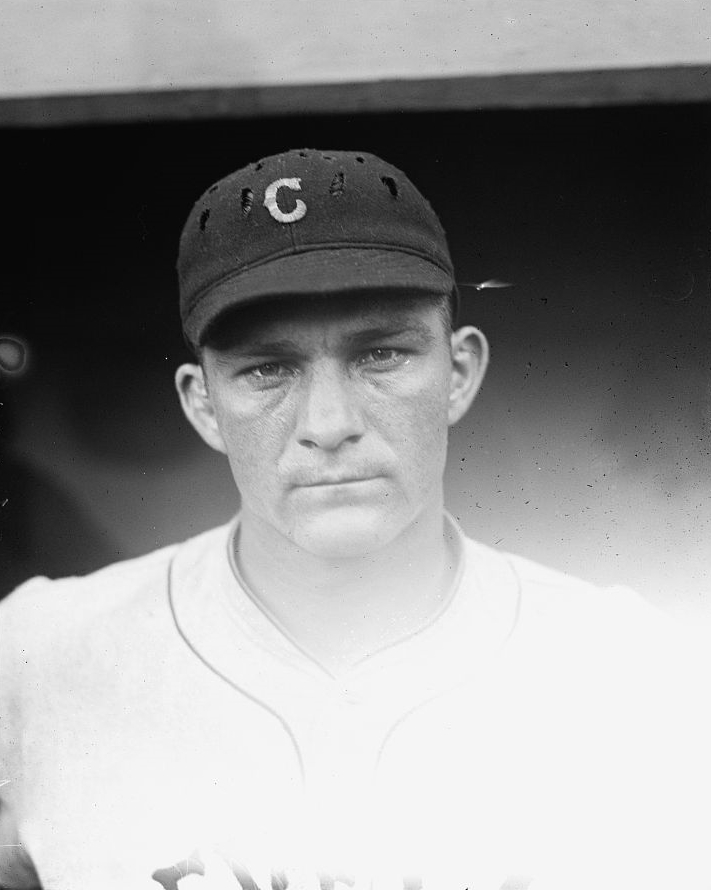
Riggs Stephenson

On a muddy field, Vanderbilt gave Alabama its only loss of the season 16–12. On its first drive of the game, Alabama took the ball to the Vanderbilt 2-yard line, but then fumbled the ball, recovered by Josh Cody of the Commodores to end the scoring threat. The second Alabama fumble resulted in the first touchdown of the game. Early in the second quarter, Riggs Stephenson fumbled the ball that was recovered by Tommy Zerfoss and returned 35-yards for a 7–0 Vanderbilt lead. They further extended their lead to 13–0 at halftime on a 20-yard Grailey Berryhill touchdown run.

Alabama rallied in the second half with a pair of two-yard Stephenson touchdown runs in the third and fourth quarter that made the score 13–12. Cody then provided for the final margin in the 16–12 Commodores' victory with his 30-yard field goal in the fourth quarter.

=== 1920: Behind Stephenson, Alabama beats Vanderbilt for the first time ===
In a "thriller from the start," Alabama beat Vanderbilt for the first time by a score of 14–7, with Riggs Stephenson starring.

A forward pass from substitute quarterback Doc Kuhn to Jess Neely got the one Commodore touchdown. "Doc Kuhn subbing for the injured Latham was the brilliant star of the day. Doc was practically unstoppable by the Alabamians and time after time threatened to lead the team to victory," reported the Atlanta Constitution. The week was marked by passing throughout the South.

=== 1921: With Wade as assistant, Vanderbilt wins ===
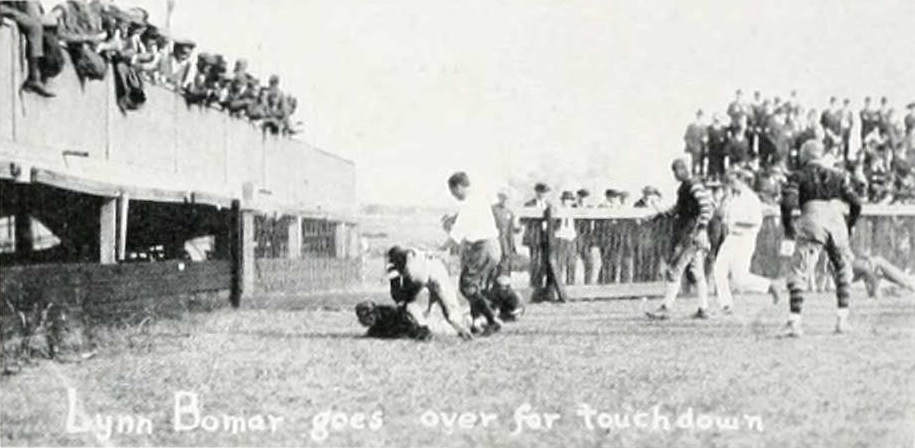
Lynn Bomar's touchdown against Alabama.

With Wallace Wade as Vanderbilt assistant coach, Vanderbilt defeated Alabama by two touchdowns in a "drowsy game", 14–0. A 30-yard pass from Neely to Tot McCullough set up a Lynn Bomar touchdown. Kuhn started the second half, and Paul Stumb intercepted a pass. Neely then rushed for 21 yards, followed by a 25-yard pass from Kuhn to McCullough to set up a Rupe Smith touchdown.

=== 1926: Wade beats McGugin ===
Now with Wallace Wade as Alabama head coach, Alabama won the national championship in 1926, and gave Vanderbilt its only loss the season, 19–7. A long pass from Bill Spears to Jimmy Armistead ended in a missed drop kick. Alabama scored touchdowns on a pass from Hoyt Winslett to Herschel Caldwell, and on a 23-yard run from Red Barnes, then later another pass from Winslett to Caldwell.

=== 1927: Vanderbilt wins in Spears' final game ===
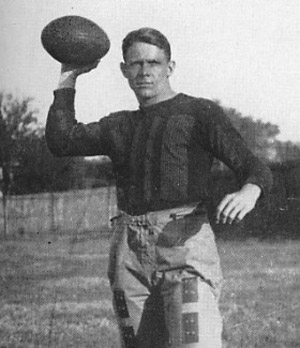
Bill Spears

In Bill Spears last game, Vanderbilt beat Alabama 14–7. A touchdown pass from Bill Spears to Roy Gibson, on fourth down, won the game. One fellow wrote Vanderbilt produced "almost certainly the legit top Heisman candidate in Spears, if there had been a Heisman Trophy to award in 1927."

=== 1929: Vanderbilt punts to victory ===
Vanderbilt defeated Alabama 13–0 in 1929. Early in the game, a 40-yard pass from Benny Parker to McGaughey got the score. Later, Amos Leonard had a 29-yard end run for the touchdown. A key to victory was Vanderbilt had longer punts.

=== 1930: National champion Alabama beats favored Vanderbilt ===
In a battle of unbeatens, Alabama beat Vanderbilt, who was favored, by a score of 12–7. Alabama scored on runs by John Campbell and John Suther, and Vanderbilt scored on a 26-yard pass from Benny Parker to Bill Schwartz. The fourth quarter was scoreless.

=== 1931: Frank Thomas beats Vanderbilt ===
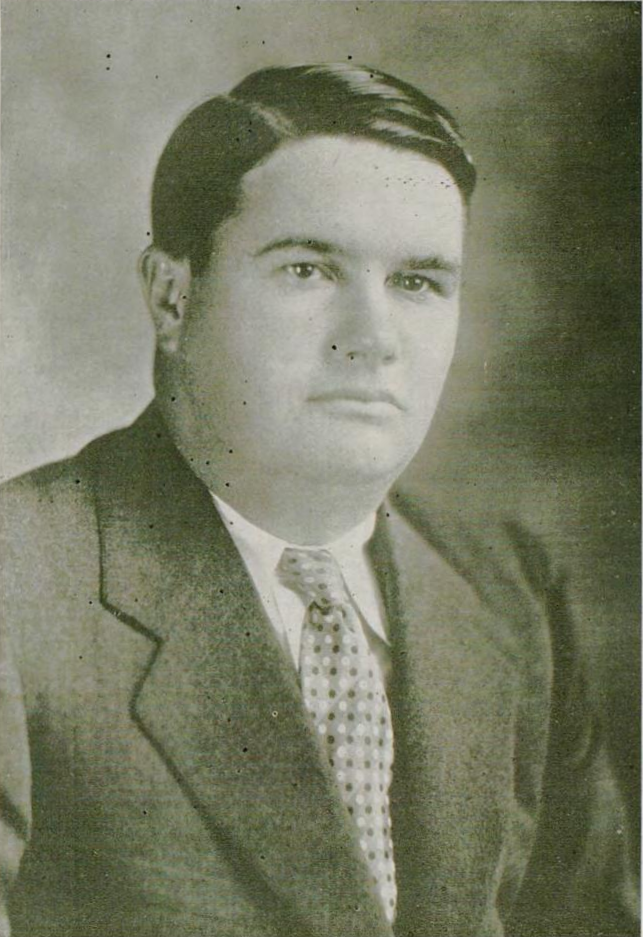
Frank Thomas

In Vanderbilt's worst season since 1914, and Frank Thomas's first season as Alabama head coach, on Thanksgiving Day to close the season, Alabama won 14–6. Alabama scored both of their touchdowns in the first half, by Johnny Cain and Hillman Holley.

=== 1932: Alabama ruins undefeated season ===
Vanderbilt previously had two ties, but no losses, before losing to Alabama 20–0. Dixie Howell had an 82-yard touchdown run.

=== 1933: Alabama wins a close game to clinch first SEC title ===
Alabama won a close game 7–0 when Dixie Howell got a touchdown on fourth down, winning the inaugural SEC championship.

=== 1934: Alabama secures Rose Bowl berth ===
In McGugin's final season, Alabama's national champion 1934 team held Vanderbilt scoreless once again, winning 34–0, securing a spot in the Rose Bowl. Led by SEC Player of the Year Dixie Howell and Don Hutson, the 1934 Alabama team is considered one of the sport's greatest.

=== 1935: Vanderbilt upsets Alabama on a fumble ===
In Ray Morrison's first season as head coach and the season finale, Vanderbilt upset Alabama 14–6. Vanderbilt's first scoring drive saw a 33-yard pass from Rand Dixon to SEC Player of the Year Willie Geny. Alabama's touchdown came on a 50-yard pass from Riley Smith to Jimmy Walker. After a punt, Joe Riley fumbled, and Byron Beard recovered for a touchdown.

=== 1936: Alabama comeback ===
Vanderbilt led at half 6-0, but Alabama threw two touchdown passes in the second half.

=== 1937: Field goal sends Alabama to the Rose Bowl ===
Alabama defeated Vanderbilt to send themselves to the Rose Bowl, 9–7. Vanderbilt fumbled on a hidden-ball trick. Substitute Sandy Sanford hit a 23-yard field goal with six minutes left to play to win the game.

=== 1941: Vanderbilt upsets Alabama in the rain ===
In 1941, Vanderbilt under coach Red Sanders upset Alabama in the rain, with the only points coming in the third quarter when Art Rebrovich threw a 25-yard touchdown pass to Jack Jenkins.

=== 1945: Alabama's biggest victory ===
The 1945 Alabama team was national champion, and handed Vanderbilt their biggest loss in the history of the rivalry, 71–0.

=== 1969: Vandy upsets Bear Bryant ===
Vanderbilt upset Bear Bryant's Alabama Crimson Tide 14–10 in Watson Brown's first year as quarterback.

=== 1979: National champion Alabama crushes Vanderbilt ===
The 1979 Alabama Crimson Tide beat Vanderbilt 66–3.

=== 1984: Vanderbilt wins upset ===
Vanderbilt upset Alabama again in 1984, 30–21, with three unanswered touchdowns.

=== 2024: Vanderbilt upsets #1 ranked Alabama ===
In 2024, led by Diego Pavia, Vanderbilt defeated #1 ranked Alabama for the first time in 40 years and 23 contests.

== Game results ==
Alabama victories	Vanderbilt victories	Tie games	Forfeits / Vacated wins (Note: Alabama's 1993 victory was vacated as the NCAA found Antonio Langham guilty of receiving improper benefits after signing with an agent following the 1992 season, forcing Alabama to forfeit all games in which Langham competed.) (Note: Alabama's 2006 and 2007 victories were vacated as part of NCAA sanctions.)

No.	Date	Location	Winning team		Losing team	
1	October 10, 1903	Nashville, TN	Vanderbilt	30	Alabama	0
2	October 7, 1905	Nashville, TN	Vanderbilt	34	Alabama	0
3	October 20, 1906	Nashville, TN	Vanderbilt	78	Alabama	0
4	November 10, 1917	Birmingham, AL	Vanderbilt	7	Alabama	2
5	November 8, 1919	Nashville, TN	Vanderbilt	16	Alabama	12
6	November 6, 1920	Birmingham, AL	Alabama	14	Vanderbilt	7
7	November 5, 1921	Birmingham, AL	Vanderbilt	14	Alabama	0
8	October 2, 1926	Nashville, TN	Alabama	19	Vanderbilt	7
9	December 3, 1927	Birmingham, AL	Vanderbilt	14	Alabama	7
10	November 2, 1929	Nashville, TN	Vanderbilt	13	Alabama	0
11	October 25, 1930	Birmingham, AL	Alabama	12	Vanderbilt	7
12	November 26, 1931	Nashville, TN	Alabama	14	Vanderbilt	6
13	November 24, 1932	Birmingham, AL	Alabama	20	Vanderbilt	0
14	November 30, 1933	Nashville, TN	Alabama	7	Vanderbilt	0
15	November 29, 1934	Birmingham, AL	Alabama	34	Vanderbilt	0
16	November 28, 1935	Nashville, TN	Vanderbilt	14	Alabama	6
17	November 25, 1936	Birmingham, AL	Alabama	14	Vanderbilt	6
18	November 25, 1937	Nashville, TN	Alabama	9	Vanderbilt	7
19	November 24, 1938	Birmingham, AL	Alabama	7	Vanderbilt	0
20	November 30, 1939	Nashville, TN	Alabama	39	Vanderbilt	0
21	November 23, 1940	Birmingham, AL	Alabama	25	Vanderbilt	21
22	November 22, 1941	Nashville, TN	Vanderbilt	7	Alabama	0
23	November 21, 1942	Birmingham, AL	Alabama	27	Vanderbilt	7
24	November 17, 1945	Nashville, TN	Alabama	71	Vanderbilt	0
25	November 16, 1946	Birmingham, AL	Alabama	12	Vanderbilt	7
26	October 4, 1947	Nashville, TN	Vanderbilt	14	Alabama	7
27	October 2, 1948	Mobile, AL	Tie	14	Tie	14
28	October 1, 1949	Nashville, TN	Vanderbilt	14	Alabama	7
29	October 7, 1950	Mobile, AL	Vanderbilt	27	Alabama	22
30	October 6, 1951	Nashville, TN	Vanderbilt	22	Alabama	20
31	October 3, 1953	Nashville, TN	Alabama	21	Vanderbilt	12
32	October 2, 1954	Mobile, AL	Alabama	28	Vanderbilt	14
33	October 1, 1955	Nashville, TN	Vanderbilt	21	Alabama	6
34	October 6, 1956	Tuscaloosa, AL	Vanderbilt	32	Alabama	7
35	October 5, 1957	Nashville, TN	Tie	6	Tie	6
36	October 4, 1958	Birmingham, AL	Tie	0	Tie	0
37	October 3, 1959	Nashville, TN	Tie	7	Tie	7
38	October 1, 1960	Birmingham, AL	Alabama	21	Vanderbilt	0
39	October 7, 1961	Nashville, TN	Alabama	35	Vanderbilt	6
40	October 6, 1962	Birmingham, AL	Alabama	17	Vanderbilt	7
41	October 5, 1963	Nashville, TN	Alabama	21	Vanderbilt	6
42	October 3, 1964	Birmingham, AL	Alabama	24	Vanderbilt	0
43	October 9, 1965	Nashville, TN	Alabama	22	Vanderbilt	7
44	October 22, 1966	Birmingham, AL	Alabama	42	Vanderbilt	6
45	October 14, 1967	Nashville, TN	Alabama	35	Vanderbilt	21

No.	Date	Location	Winning team		Losing team	
46	October 12, 1968	Tuscaloosa, AL	Alabama	31	Vanderbilt	7
47	October 11, 1969	Nashville, TN	Vanderbilt	14	Alabama	10
48	October 10, 1970	Tuscaloosa, AL	Alabama	35	Vanderbilt	11
49	October 9, 1971	Nashville, TN	Alabama	42	Vanderbilt	0
50	September 30, 1972	Tuscaloosa, AL	Alabama	48	Vanderbilt	21
51	September 29, 1973	Nashville, TN	Alabama	44	Vanderbilt	0
52	September 28, 1974	Tuscaloosa, AL	Alabama	23	Vanderbilt	10
53	September 27, 1975	Nashville, TN	Alabama	40	Vanderbilt	7
54	September 25, 1976	Tuscaloosa, AL	Alabama	42	Vanderbilt	14
55	September 24, 1977	Nashville, TN	Alabama	24	Vanderbilt	12
56	September 30, 1978	Tuscaloosa, AL	Alabama	51	Vanderbilt	28
57	September 29, 1979	Nashville, TN	Alabama	66	Vanderbilt	3
58	September 27, 1980	Tuscaloosa, AL	Alabama	41	Vanderbilt	0
59	September 26, 1981	Nashville, TN	Alabama	28	Vanderbilt	7
60	September 25, 1982	Tuscaloosa, AL	Alabama	24	Vanderbilt	21
61	September 24, 1983	Nashville, TN	Alabama	44	Vanderbilt	24
62	September 29, 1984	Tuscaloosa, AL	Vanderbilt	30	Alabama	21
63	September 28, 1985	Nashville, TN	Alabama	40	Vanderbilt	20
64	September 6, 1986	Tuscaloosa, AL	Alabama	42	Vanderbilt	10
65	September 26, 1987	Nashville, TN	Alabama	30	Vanderbilt	23
66	September 24, 1988	Tuscaloosa, AL	Alabama	44	Vanderbilt	10
67	September 30, 1989	Nashville, TN	Alabama	20	Vanderbilt	14
68	September 29, 1990	Tuscaloosa, AL	Alabama	59	Vanderbilt	28
69	September 28, 1991	Nashville, TN	Alabama	48	Vanderbilt	17
70	September 5, 1992	Tuscaloosa, AL	Alabama	25	Vanderbilt	8
71	September 11, 1993	Nashville, TN	Alabama†	17	Vanderbilt	6
72	September 10, 1994	Tuscaloosa, AL	Alabama	17	Vanderbilt	7
73	September 2, 1995	Nashville, TN	Alabama	33	Vanderbilt	25
74	September 14, 1996	Tuscaloosa, AL	Alabama	36	Vanderbilt	26
75	September 11, 1997	Nashville, TN	Alabama	20	Vanderbilt	0
76	September 12, 1998	Birmingham, AL	Alabama	32	Vanderbilt	7
77	September 4, 1999	Nashville, TN	Alabama	28	Vanderbilt	17
78	September 9, 2000	Birmingham, AL	Alabama	28	Vanderbilt	10
79	September 8, 2001	Nashville, TN	Alabama	12	Vanderbilt	9
80	November 2, 2002	Nashville, TN	Alabama	30	Vanderbilt	8
81	September 9, 2006	Tuscaloosa, AL	Alabama^{‡}	13	Vanderbilt	10
82	September 8, 2007	Nashville, TN	Alabama^{‡}	24	Vanderbilt	10
83	October 8, 2011	Tuscaloosa, AL	Alabama	34	Vanderbilt	0
84	September 23, 2017	Nashville, TN	Alabama	59	Vanderbilt	0
85	September 24, 2022	Tuscaloosa, AL	Alabama	55	Vanderbilt	3
86	October 5, 2024	Nashville, TN	Vanderbilt	40	Alabama	35
87	October 4, 2025	Tuscaloosa, AL	Alabama	30	Vanderbilt	14
88	November 14, 2026	Nashville, TN	Alabama	21	Vanderbilt	6
Series: Alabama leads 62–20–4
† Alabama forfeited as part of NCAA penalties ‡ Alabama vacated wins as part of NCAA penalties
