= 1945 Big Ten Conference football season =

- Sport: Football
- Teams: 9
- Top draft pick: Mac Wenskunas
- Champion: Indiana
- Season MVP: Ollie Cline

Football seasons
- 1944 1946

1945 Big Ten Conference football standings
	Conf.					Overall
Team	W		L		T	W		L		T
No. 4 Indiana $	5	–	0	–	1	9	–	0	–	1
No. 6 Michigan	5	–	1	–	0	7	–	3	–	0
No. 12 Ohio State	5	–	2	–	0	7	–	2	–	0
Northwestern	3	–	3	–	1	4	–	4	–	1
Purdue	3	–	3	–	0	7	–	3	–	0
Wisconsin	2	–	3	–	1	3	–	4	–	2
Illinois	1	–	4	–	1	2	–	6	–	1
Minnesota	1	–	5	–	0	4	–	5	–	0
Iowa	1	–	5	–	0	2	–	7	–	0
$ – Conference champion; Rankings from AP Poll

The 1945 Big Ten Conference football season was the 50th season of college football played by the member schools of the Big Ten Conference (also known as the Western Conference) and was a part of the 1945 college football season.

The 1945 Indiana Hoosiers football team, under head coach Bo McMillin, compiled the only undefeated record and won the first Big Ten championship in the program's history. The Hoosiers compiled a 9–0–1 record, led the conference in both scoring offense (27.9 points per game) and scoring defense (5.6 points allowed per game), and finished the season ranked No. 4 in the final AP Poll. The lone blemish on the team's record was a 7-7 tie with Northwestern in the second game of the season. End Bob Ravensberg was a consensus first-team pick on the 1945 College Football All-America Team. Freshman halfback George Taliaferro rushed for 719 yards (the first African-American player to lead the Big Ten in rushing) and received second-team All-American honors.

Michigan, under head coach Fritz Crisler, compiled a 7–3 record and was ranked No. 6 in the final AP Poll. Center Harold Watts won the team's most valuable player award. Michigan's three losses were against No. 1 Army, No. 3 Navy, and No. 4 Indiana.

== Season overview ==
=== Results and team statistics ===
Conf. Rank	Team	Head coach	AP final	AP high	Overall record	Conf. record	PPG	PAG	MVP
1	Indiana	Bo McMillin	#4	#4	9–0–1	5–0–1	27.9	5.6	Howard Brown
2	Michigan	Fritz Crisler	#6	#6	7–3	5–1	18.7	9.9	Harold Watts
3	Ohio State	Carroll Widdoes	#12	#4	7–2	5–2	21.6	7.9	Ollie Cline
4	Northwestern	Pappy Waldorf	NR	#20	4–4–1	3–3–1	14.1	16.4	Dick Conners
5	Purdue	Cecil Isbell	NR	#4	7–3	3–3	19.8	12.5	Norman Maloney
6	Wisconsin	Harry Stuhldreher	NR	NR	3–4–2	2–3–1	14.2	14.2	Clarence Esser
7	Illinois	Ray Eliot	NR	NR	2–6–1	1–4–1	10.3	11.6	Mac Wenskunas
8	Minnesota	Bernie Bierman	NR	#5	4–5	1–5	19.7	17.2	Bob Fitch
9	Iowa	Clem Crowe	NR	NR	2–7	1–5	8.2	34.4	Arthur Johnson

Key
AP final = Team's rank in the final AP Poll of the 1945 season
AP high = Team's highest rank in the AP Poll throughout the 1945 season
PPG = Average of points scored per game
PAG = Average of points allowed per game
MVP = Most valuable player as voted by players on each team as part of the voting process to determine the winner of the Chicago Tribune Silver Football trophy

=== Bowl games ===
During the 1945 season, the Big Ten maintained its long-standing ban on postseason games. Accordingly, no Big Ten teams participated in any bowl games.

== All-Big Ten players ==
The following players were picked by the Associated Press (AP) and/or the United Press (UP) as first-team players on the 1945 All-Big Ten Conference football team.

- Max Morris, end, Northwestern (AP, UP)
- Ted Kluszewski, end, Indiana (AP, UP)
- Russ Thomas, tackle, Ohio State (AP, UP)
- Clarence Esser, tackle, Wisconsin (AP)
- Tom Hughes, tackle, Purdue (UP)
- Warren Amling, guard, Ohio State (AP, UP)
- Jim Lecture, guard, Northwestern (AP, UP)
- Harold Watts, center, Michigan (AP, UP)
- Pete Pihos, quarterback, Indiana (AP, UP)
- George Taliaferro, halfback, Indiana (AP, UP)
- Ed Cody, halfback, Purdue (AP, UP)
- Ollie Cline, fullback, Ohio State (AP, UP)

== All-Americans ==
At the end of the 1945 season, Big Ten players secured three of the consensus first-team picks for the 1945 College Football All-America Team. The Big Ten's consensus All-Americans were:

- Bob Ravensberg, end, Indiana (FWAA, SN, CP, LK)
- Max Morris, end, Northwestern (AAB, AFCA, INS, YA, WC)
- Warren Amling, guard, Ohio State (AAB, AFCA, AP, COL, FWAA, INS, LK, SN, UP, CP, NL, NYS, OF, WC)

Other Big Ten players who were named first-team All-Americans by at least one selector were:

- Tom Hughes, tackle, Purdue (LK, OF, NL)
- Pete Pihos, fullback, Indiana (YA)

== 1946 NFL draft ==
The following Big Ten players were selected in the first six rounds of the 1946 NFL draft:

Name	Position	Team	Round	Overall pick
Mac Wenskunas	Center	Illinois	2	11
Julie Rykovich	Back	Illinois	2	14
Bob Nussbaumer	Back	Michigan	3	21
Russ Thomas	Tackle	Ohio State	3	22
Ed Cody	Back	Purdue	5	36
