= 1945 Michigan Wolverines football team =

American college football season

1945 Michigan Wolverines football
- Conference: Big Ten Conference

Ranking
- AP: No. 6
- Record: 7–3 (5–1 Big Ten)
- Head coach: Fritz Crisler (8th season)
- Offensive scheme: Single-wing
- MVP: Harold Watts
- Captain: Joseph Ponsetto
- Home stadium: Michigan Stadium

1945 Big Ten Conference football standings
	Conf.					Overall
Team	W		L		T	W		L		T
No. 4 Indiana $	5	–	0	–	1	9	–	0	–	1
No. 6 Michigan	5	–	1	–	0	7	–	3	–	0
No. 12 Ohio State	5	–	2	–	0	7	–	2	–	0
Northwestern	3	–	3	–	1	4	–	4	–	1
Purdue	3	–	3	–	0	7	–	3	–	0
Wisconsin	2	–	3	–	1	3	–	4	–	2
Illinois	1	–	4	–	1	2	–	6	–	1
Minnesota	1	–	5	–	0	4	–	5	–	0
Iowa	1	–	5	–	0	2	–	7	–	0
$ – Conference champion; Rankings from AP Poll

The 1945 Michigan Wolverines football team represented the University of Michigan in the 1945 Big Ten Conference football season. In their eighth year under head coach was Fritz Crisler, the Wolverines compiled a 7–3 record (5–1 Big Ten) and finished the season ranked #6 in the final Associated Press Poll. Quarterback Joe Ponsetto was the team captain, and center Harold Watts won the Most Valuable Player award and was selected as a first-team All-Big Ten Conference player.

Michigan's three losses during the 1945 season came against teams ranked in the top four in the final AP Poll: #1 Army (28–7 loss at Yankee Stadium), #3 Navy (33–7 loss at Baltimore Stadium), and #4 Indiana (13–7 loss at Michigan Stadium). The Wolverines also defeated three ranked opponents in Illinois, Minnesota, and Ohio State. In their seven victories, the team registered three shutouts and outscored the teams 166 to 25, including margins of 40–0 and 26–0 in rivalry games against Michigan State and Minnesota.

== Schedule ==
Date	Opponent	Rank	Site	Result	Attendance
September 15	Great Lakes Navy*		Michigan Stadium; Ann Arbor, MI	W 27–2	26,076
September 22	Indiana		Michigan Stadium; Ann Arbor, MI	L 7–13	27,536
September 29	Michigan State*		Michigan Stadium; Ann Arbor, MI (rivalry)	W 40–0	37,694
October 6	at Northwestern		Dyche Stadium; Evanston, IL (rivalry)	W 20–7	32,772
October 13	vs. No. 1 Army*	No. 9	Yankee Stadium; Bronx, NY	L 7–28	62,878
October 27	at Illinois	No. 16	Memorial Stadium; Champaign, IL (rivalry)	W 19–0	54,085
November 3	No. 16 Minnesota	No. 10	Michigan Stadium; Ann Arbor, MI (Little Brown Jug)	W 26–0	84,472
November 10	at No. 4 Navy*	No. 7	Municipal Stadium; Baltimore, MD	L 7–33	56,880
November 17	No. 11 Purdue	No. T–14	Michigan Stadium; Ann Arbor, MI	W 27–13	48,528
November 24	No. 7 Ohio State	No. 8	Michigan Stadium; Ann Arbor, MI (rivalry)	W 7–3	85,200
*Non-conference game; Rankings from AP Poll released prior to the game

== Rankings ==
Ranking movements Legend: ██ Increase in ranking ██ Decrease in ranking т = Tied with team above or below ( ) = First-place votes
	Week								
Poll	1	2	3	4	5	6	7	8	Final
AP	9 (1)	13	16	10	7	14т	8	7	6

== Season summary ==
=== Pre-season ===
The 1944 Michigan Wolverines football team compiled an 8–2 record and finished its season ranked #8 in the final AP Poll. With World War II still ongoing through the summer of 1945, only a few starters from the 1944 team returned for the start of the 1945 season; Michigan's returning starters were led by quarterback Joe Ponsetto and center Harold Watts. Due to either graduation or wartime military service, the majority of the starters from the 1944 team did not return for the start of the 1945 season, including the following:

- End Bruce Hilkene, who started nine games in 1944 and had been voted by his teammates to serve as captain of the 1945 team, was transferred in February 1945 for military duty elsewhere. Hilkene named Ponsetto to serve as team captain in his absence.
- Fullback Bob Wiese, Michigan's leading scorer in 1944, was called into the military in November 1944.
- Tackle Milan Lazetich, a second-team All-American in 1944, graduated and played in the National Football League in 1945.
- Guard Quentin Sickels, who started all 10 games for Michigan in 1944, joined the U.S. Coast Guard in December 1944.
- Halfback Gene Derricotte, who started nine games for Michigan in 1944, was drafted into the military in December 1944.
- Fullback Don Lund, who was selected as the Wolverines' Most Valuable Player in 1944, graduated and played in Major League Baseball in 1945.
- Halfback Bob Nussbaumer, who started seven games for Michigan in 1944, missed the start of the 1945 season due to service in the Marine Corps, but was discharged in September 1945 and rejoined the team for the second game of the 1945 season.
- End Art Renner, who started nine games for Michigan in 1944, also missed the start of the 1945 season due to wartime service in the Marine Corps, but he was discharged in time for the fourth game of the 1945 season.

Despite the many personnel changes, head coach Fritz Crisler in late June 1945 predicted a "flying start" for the 1945 team. In July and the first half of August 1945, Michigan conducted a six-week summer practice, with 97 candidates participating. The Associated Press (AP) praised the play of halfback Wally Teninga and fullback Dan Dworsky in a public scrimmage held on August 11, 1945, but expressed concern about mistakes made by the defense. The AP observed: "While most candidates showed a definite lack of college caliber experience, sideline observers agreed that there is plenty of reason to anticipate a good Michigan team by the time the season opener rolls around."

On August 15, 1945, the United States celebrated Victory over Japan Day, marking the end of hostilities in World War II. Less than two weeks later, on August 27, 1945, after a two-week break following summer practice, Michigan began fall drills in Ann Arbor. During a scrimmage in early September, end Ed Bahlow, a Navy training veteran who had played for Wisconsin in 1943 and was considered Michigan's best end prospect since Ed Frutig, sustained a broken leg, just above his right ankle, in a collision with Dan Dworsky and was lost to the team for the season.

During the first week of September 1945, shortly after his discharge from the military, Tom Harmon, an All-American at Michigan in 1939 and 1940, turned down an offer to play with the Chicago Bears and signed with radio station WJR to broadcast accounts of Michigan football games.

=== Week 1: Great Lakes Navy ===
Week 1: Great Lakes Navy at Michigan

Team	1	2	3	4	Total
Great Lakes Navy	2	0	0	0	2
• Michigan	14	0	0	13	27

- Date: September 15, 1945
- Location: Michigan Stadium
  Ann Arbor, Michigan
- Referee: Mike Layden (Notre Dame)

On September 15, 1945, Michigan played a Great Lakes Navy Bluejackets football team coached by Paul Brown and featuring an all-star backfield consisting of quarterback George Terlep, halfbacks Frank Aschenbrenner and Bob Sullivan, and fullback Marion Motley. In a game played at Michigan Stadium, Michigan won by a 27 to 2 score. Michigan's four touchdowns were scored by Edward McNeill (two touchdown receptions in the first quarter, covering nine yards from Wally Teninga and covering 57 yards from Joe Ponsetto), Wally Teninga (short run), and Howard Yerges (short run). Ponsetto kicked two points after touchdown, and Bob Callahan kicked one. Great Lakes' only points came on a safety in the first quarter after Dan Dworsky fumbled and Ponsetto recovered the ball in the end zone.

Michigan's starting lineup against Great Lakes Naval was Donovan Hershberger (left end), George Johnson (left tackle), Dominic Tomasi (left guard), Harold Watts (center), John Lintol (right guard), Eugene Hinton (right tackle), Edward McNeill (right end), Joe Ponsetto (quarterback), Wally Teninga (left halfback), Warren Bentz (right halfback), and Dan Dworsky (fullback).

=== Week 2: Indiana ===
Week 2: Indiana at Michigan

Team	1	2	3	4	Total
• Indiana	6	7	0	0	13
Michigan	0	0	7	0	7

- Date: September 22, 1945
- Location: Michigan Stadium
  Ann Arbor, Michigan
- Referee: Wm. A. Blake (Loras)

On September 22, 1945, Michigan played an Indiana team that went through the entire season without a loss and ended up being ranked #4 in the final AP Poll. The Indiana team featured All-Big Ten quarterback Ben Raimondi, halfbacks George Taliaferro (later inducted into the College Football Hall of Fame) and Mel Groomes (the first African-American signed by the Detroit Lions), and end Ted Kluszewski (later an All-Star in Major League Baseball). The Wolverines lost to the Hoosiers by a 13 to 7 score at Michigan Stadium. Fullback Dan Dworsky scored Michigan's only touchdown, and Joe Ponsetto kicked the point after touchdown.

Michigan's starting lineup against Indiana was Donovan Hershberger (left end), George Johnson (left tackle), Dominic Tomasi (left guard), Harold Watts (center), John Lintol (right guard), Eugene Hinton (right tackle), Edward McNeill (right end), Joe Ponsetto (quarterback), Jack Weisenburger (left halfback), Bob Nussbaumer (right halfback), and Dan Dworsky (fullback).

=== Week 3: Michigan State ===
Week 3: Michigan State at Michigan

Team	1	2	3	4	Total
Michigan State	0	0	0	0	0
• Michigan	7	13	7	13	40

- Date: September 29, 1945
- Location: Michigan Stadium
  Ann Arbor, Michigan
- Game attendance: 35,200
- Referee: Mike Layden (Notre Dame)

On September 29, 1945, Michigan defeated Michigan State by a 40 to 0 score. Michigan's six touchdowns were scored by Dan Dworsky (one-yard run in first quarter), Donovan Hershberger (touchdown pass from Joe Ponsetto), Bob Nussbaumer (three-yard run in second quarter), Wally Teninga (three-yard run in third quarter and another touchdown run in the fourth quarter), and Wesley Muelder (10-yard interception return for touchdown). Ponsetto kicked four points after touchdown and completed three of four passes for 89 yards, including the touchdown throw to Hershberger. Michigan gained 274 rushing yards and 128 yards passing, outpacing the Spartans who were limited to 37 rushing yards and 48 passing yards. Michigan's rushing leaders were Dworsky (16 carries for 64 yards) and Nussbaumer (8 carries for 60 yards).

Michigan's starting lineup against Michigan State was Hershberger (left end), George Johnson (left tackle), John Smith (left guard), Harold Watts (center), F. Stuart Wilkins (right guard), Eugene Hinton (right tackle), Edward McNeill (right end), Joe Ponsetto (quarterback), Teninga (left halfback), Henry Fonde (right halfback), and Dworsky (fullback).

=== Week 4: at Northwestern ===
Week 4: Michigan at Northwestern

Team	1	2	3	4	Total
• Michigan	6	7	7	0	20
Northwestern	7	0	0	0	7

- Date: October 6, 1945
- Location: Dyche Stadium, Evanston, Illinois
- Referee: Rollie Barnum (Wisconsin)

On October 6, 1945, Michigan defeated Northwestern by a 20 to 7 score. Michigan's three touchdowns were scored by James Foltz, Pete Elliott, and Dan Dworsky. Joe Ponsetto kicked two points after touchdown.

Michigan's starting lineup against Northwestern was Art Renner (left end), George Johnson (left tackle), Dominic Tomasi (left guard), Harold Watts (center), F. Stuart Wilkins (right guard), Eugene Hinton (right tackle), Edward McNeill (right end), Joe Ponsetto (quarterback), Wally Teninga (left halfback), Warren Bentz (right halfback), and Dan Dworsky (fullback).

=== Week 5: vs. Army ===
Week 5: Michigan vs. Army

Team	1	2	3	4	Total
Michigan	0	0	7	0	7
• Army	0	14	7	7	28

- Date: October 13, 1945
- Location: Yankee Stadium, Bronx, New York
- Referee: Thomas A. Timlin (Nigara)

On October 13, 1945, Michigan lost to the eventual national champion Army by a 28 to 7 score at Yankee Stadium. The Army team was loaded with talent, including four consensus All-Americans and two Heisman Trophy winners: halfback and 1946 Heisman winner Glenn Davis; fullback and 1945 Heisman winner Doc Blanchard; tackle Tex Coulter; and guard John Green. Blanchard scored two touchdowns in the Michigan game, and Davis scored one. End Art Renner scored Michigan's only touchdown in the third quarter on a pass from Wally Teninga, and Joe Ponsetto kicked the point after touchdown. Army out-gained Michigan on the ground 380 yards to 143.

Outmanned by Army, Crisler unveiled a platoon system in which separate groups played offense and defense. According to one account, Crisler developed the two-platoon system "in a bout of desperation." Crisler later recalled, "I reported the plan to the players and told them we might have a lot of fun. At the end of three periods we were tied 7–7 and I knew it couldn't last. I knew sooner or later Army would overpower us. And that's what happened. We lost 28 to 7—but we had a lot of fun."

Michigan's starting lineup against Army was Donovan Hershberger (left end), George Johnson (left tackle), Dominic Tomasi (left guard), Harold Watts (center), F. Stuart Wilkins (right guard), Eugene Hinton (right tackle), Art Renner (right end), Joe Ponsetto (quarterback), Wally Teninga (left halfback), Bob Nussbaumer (right halfback), and Jack Weisenburger (fullback).

=== Week 6: at Illinois ===
Week 6: Michigan at Illinois

Team	1	2	3	4	Total
• Michigan	0	0	0	19	19
Illinois	0	0	0	0	0

- Date: October 27, 1945
- Location: Memorial Stadium, Champaign, Il
- Game attendance: 54,572

On October 27, 1945, Michigan defeated Illinois by a 19 to 0 score. Michigan's touchdowns were all scored in the fourth quarter by William Ford, Jr. (16-yard return of a blocked punt, block by Ed McNeill and Joe Soboleski), Wally Teninga (10-yard run), and Art Renner (short pass from Teninga). Bob Callahan kicked one of three points after touchdown. Michigan out-gained Illinois on the ground, 177 rushing yards to 46.

Michigan's starting lineup against Illinois was Donovan Hershberger (left end), George Johnson (left tackle), Dominic Tomasi (left guard), Harold Watts (center), F. Stuart Wilkins (right guard), Eugene Hinton (right tackle), Renner (right end), Joe Ponsetto (quarterback), Teninga (left halfback), Henry Fonde (right halfback), and Jack Weisenburger (fullback).

=== Week 7: Minnesota ===
Week 7: Minnesota at Michigan

Team	1	2	3	4	Total
Minnesota	0	0	0	0	0
• Michigan	7	0	0	19	26

- Date: November 3, 1945
- Location: Michigan Stadium, Ann Arbor, Michigan
- Game attendance: 85,132
- Referee: Dr. R. W. Huegel (Marquette)

On November 3, 1945, Michigan defeated Minnesota by a 26 to 0 score. Howard Yerges started his first game as Michigan's quarterback, following an injury to Joe Ponsetto in the Illinois game. Michigan's touchdowns were scored by Yerges (short run in the first quarter), fullback Jack Weisenburger (13-yard run in fourth quarter), and halfbacks Wally Teninga and Warren Bentz (12-yard pass from Don Robinson). Bob Callahan kicked two points after touchdown. Michigan gained 261 rushing yards and 131 passing yards in the game.

Michigan's starting lineup against Minnesota was Donovan Hershberger (left end), George Johnson (left tackle), Dominic Tomasi (left guard), Harold Watts (center), F. Stuart Wilkins (right guard), Eugene Hinton (right tackle), Art Renner (right end), Yerges (quarterback), Teninga (left halfback), Bob Nussbaumer (right halfback), and Weisenburger (fullback).

=== Week 8: at Navy ===
Week 8: Michigan at Navy

Team	1	2	3	4	Total
Michigan	0	7	0	0	7
• Navy	6	7	14	6	33

- Date: November 10, 1945
- Location: Baltimore Stadium, Baltimore
- Game attendance: 59,114

On November 10, 1945, Michigan lost to a #4-ranked Navy team by a 33 to 7 score. The game was played at Baltimore Stadium in front of a crowd of 59,114 spectators. Michigan's only touchdown was scored by Jack Weisenburger on a two-yard run in the second quarter, with George Chiames kicking the point after touchdown. Navy intercepted four Michigan passes and out-gained the Wolverines on the ground, 235 rushing yards to 68.

Michigan's starting lineup against Navy was Donovan Hershberger (left end), George Johnson (left tackle), Dominic Tomasi (left guard), Harold Watts (center), F. Stuart Wilkins (right guard), Eugene Hinton (right tackle), Art Renner (right end), Dan Dworsky (quarterback), Wally Teninga (left halfback), Bob Nussbaumer (right halfback), and Weisenburger (fullback).

=== Week 9: Purdue ===
Week 9: Purdue at Michigan

Team	1	2	3	4	Total
Purdue	0	7	0	6	13
• Michigan	7	13	0	7	27

- Date: November 17, 1945
- Location: Michigan Stadium, Ann Arbor, Michigan
- Referee: Rollie Barnum (Wisconsin)

On November 17, 1945, Michigan defeated Purdue by a 27 to 13 score. Halfback Bob Nussbaumer scored two touchdowns, and additional touchdowns were scored by Pete Elliott and Art Renner. George Chiames kicked three points after touchdown.

Michigan's starting lineup against Purdue was Ed McNeill (left end), George Johnson (left tackle), Dominic Tomasi (left guard), Tony Momsen (center), F. Stuart Wilkins (right guard), Eugene Hinton (right tackle), Art Renner (right end), Dan Dworsky (quarterback), Pete Elliott (left halfback), Bob Nussbaumer (right halfback), and Jack Weisenburger (fullback).

=== Week 10: Ohio State ===
Week 10: Ohio State at Michigan

Team	1	2	3	4	Total
Ohio State	0	0	3	0	3
• Michigan	0	0	0	7	7

- Date: November 24, 1945
- Location: Michigan Stadium, Ann Arbor, Michigan
- Game attendance: 85,132
- Referee: William Blake (Loras)

On November 24, 1945, Michigan defeated Ohio State by a 7 to 3 score. After a scoreless first half, Ohio State took a 3–0 lead in the third quarter on a field goal by Max Schnittker. With 6 minutes and 45 seconds remaining, Henry Fonde scored a touchdown on a short run, and George Chiames kicked the point after touchdown.

Michigan's starting lineup against Purdue was Ed McNeill (left end), George Johnson (left tackle), Dominic Tomasi (left guard), Tony Momsen (center), F. Stuart Wilkins (right guard), Eugene Hinton (right tackle), Art Renner (right end), Howard Yerges (quarterback), Pete Elliott (left halfback), Bob Nussbaumer (right halfback), and Jack Weisenburger (fullback).

=== Scoring summary ===
Player	Touchdowns	Extra points	Field goals	Points
Wally Teninga	5	0	0	30
Dan Dworsky	3	0	0	18
Bob Nussbaumer	3	0	0	18
Art Renner	3	0	0	18
Pete Elliott	2	0	0	12
Ed McNeill	2	0	0	12
Jack Weisenburger	2	0	0	12
Howard Yerges	2	0	0	12
Joe Ponsetto	0	10	0	10
Warren Bentz	1	0	0	6
James Foltz	1	0	0	6
Henry Fonde	1	0	0	6
William Ford, Jr.	1	0	0	6
Donovan Hershberger	1	0	0	6
Wesley Muelder	1	0	0	6
Bob Callahan	0	4	0	4
George Chiames	0	5	0	5
Totals	28	19	0	187

=== Post-season ===
The Associated Press released the results of its final poll on December 4, 1945. The 1945 Army Cadets football team, which defeated Michigan at Yankee Stadium earlier in the season, was selected as the national champion with 1,160 points and first-place votes by 115 of 116 voters. Two other Michigan opponents, Navy (#3) and Indiana (#4) finished among the top four teams in the final AP Poll with 941 and 720 points respectively. With its three losses coming to three of the top four teams, Michigan was ranked #6 in the final poll with 378 points.

No member of Michigan's 1945 football team was selected as a first-team honoree on the 1945 College Football All-America Team, though center Harold Watts received third-team honors from the Central Press Association. Watts also received first-team honors from both the Associated Press (AP) and United Press (UP) on the 1945 All-Big Ten Conference football team, and was selected by his teammates for the team's Most Valuable Player award. Quarterback and team captain Joe Ponsetto received second-team All-Big Ten honors from the UP. End Art Renner was selected by his 1945 teammates to serve as captain of the 1946 Michigan team.

== Players ==
=== Varsity letter winners ===
The following 29 players received varsity letters for their participation on the 1945 Michigan football team. For players who were starters, the list also includes the number of games started by position. Players who started at least five games are displayed in bold.

- Warren W. Bentz – started 1 game at right halfback
- Bob Callahan, tackle, St. Louis, Missouri
- George J. Chiames, fullback, Freeport, Illinois
- Robert Derleth, tackle, Marquette, Michigan
- **Dan Dworsky**, fullback, Sioux Falls, South Dakota – started 5 games at fullback, 2 games at quarterback
- Pete Elliott, halfback, Bloomington, Illinois – started 2 games at left halfback
- James H. Foltz, fullback, Toledo, Ohio
- Henry Fonde, halfback, Knoxville, Tennessee – started 2 games at right halfback
- Len Ford, end, Washington, D.C.
- Cecil Freihofer, guard, Indianapolis, Indiana
- **Donovan P. Hershberger**, end, Freeport, Illinois – started 7 games at left end, 1 game at right end
- **Gene Hinton**, tackle, Drumright, Oklahoma – started 10 games at right tackle
- **George H. Johnson**, tackle, Columbus, Ohio – started 10 games at left tackle
- John F. Lintol, guard, Detroit, Michigan – started 2 games at right guard
- **Edward D. McNeill**, end, Toledo, Ohio – started 3 games at left end, 2 games at right end
- Tony Momsen, center, Toledo, Ohio – 2 games at center
- Wesley W. Muelder, halfback, Colfax, Illinois
- **Bob Nussbaumer**, halfback, Oak Park, Illinois – started 7 games at right halfback
- **Joe Ponsetto**, quarterback, Flint, Michigan – started 6 games at quarterback
- Michael Prashaw, tackle, Massena, New York
- **Art Renner**, end, Sturgis, Michigan – started 7 games at right end
- John E. Smith, guard, Muncie, Indiana – started 1 game at left guard
- Joe Soboleski, guard, Grand Rapids, Michigan – guard
- **Wally Teninga**, halfback, Chicago, Illinois – started 7 games at left halfback
- **Dominic Tomasi**, guard, Flint, Michigan – started 9 games at left guard
- **Harold Watts**, center, Birmingham, Michigan – started 8 games at center
- **Jack Weisenburger**, halfback, Muskegon Heights, Michigan – started 5 games at fullback, 1 game at left halfback
- **F. Stuart Wilkins**, guard, Canton, Ohio – started 8 games at right guard
- Howard Yerges, quarterback, Point Pleasant, West Virginia – started 2 games at quarterback

=== Non-varsity letter winners ===
The following players appeared on the roster of the 1945 Michigan football team but did not receive varsity letters.

- Earl C. Albright, halfback, Milwaukee, Wisconsin
- James M. Artley, quarterback, Savannah, Georgia
- Louis A. Brunstig, Jr., end, Rochester, Minnesota
- Horace Coleman, halfback, Hamtramck, Michigan
- William F. Crockett, Wailuku, Maui, Hawaii
- Richard M. Davis, fullback, Downers Grove, Illinois
- Howard R. Doty, quarterback, Downers Grove, Illinois
- Edward Grenkoski, end, Saginaw, Michigan
- George Hutter, quarterback, Fond du Lac, Wisconsin
- C. Robert Johnson, tackle, Dearborn, Michigan
- Russell L. Kavanaugh, center, Detroit, Michigan
- Stanley J. Kuick, end, Midland, Michigan
- Frank Nakamura, guard, Ann Arbor, Michigan
- John A. Ott, halfback, Traverse City, Michigan
- William Pratt, tackle, Traverse City, Michigan
- Russell Reader, halfback, Dearborn, Michigan
- William A. Redmond, quarterback, Kalamazoo, Michigan
- Don Robinson, halfback, Detroit, Michigan
- Reginald G. Sauls, halfback, Detroit, Michigan
- Philip Stangle, tackle, St. Cloud, Minnesota
- Robert L. Swanson, center, Lansing, Michigan
- Robert Wahl, tackle, Oak Park, Illinois
- John Weyers, guard, Page, North Dakota
- Dennis Youngblood, end, Rochester, Michigan

=== Awards and honors ===
- Captain: Joseph Ponsetto
- All-Conference: Harold Watts
- Most Valuable Player: Harold Watts

=== NFL and AAFC drafts ===
The following 15 players from the 1945 Michigan football team were drafted to play in either the National Football League (NFL) or the All-America Football Conference (AAFC):

- Bob Callahan: Callahan was selected by the Chicago Cardinals with the 289th pick in the 1947 NFL draft. He played for the Buffalo Bills in 1948.
- Robert Derleth: Derleth was selected by the Chicago Rockets with the 20th pick in the 1947 AAFC Draft, and by the Detroit Lions with the 29th pick in the 1944 NFL draft. He played for the Lions in 1947.
- Dan Dworsky: Dworsky was drafted by the Los Angeles Dons with the fifth pick in the AAFC's secret draft held in July 1948, and by the Green Bay Packers with the 15th pick in the 1949 NFL draft. He played for the Dons in 1949.
- Pete Elliott: Elliott was drafted by the Chicago Hornets with the third pick in the AAFC's secret draft held in July 1948, and by the Detroit Lions with the 127th pick in the 1948 NFL draft. He opted instead to pursue a career in coaching starting in 1949 as an assistant coach at Oregon State and later serving as a head coach at Nebraska, California, Illinois, and Miami. He was inducted into the College Football Hall of Fame in 1994.
- Len Ford: Ford was drafted by the Los Angeles Dons with the 14th pick in the 1948 AAFC Draft. He played 11 years in the NFL from 1948 to 1958 and was inducted into the Pro Football Hall of Fame in 1976.
- Ed McNeill: McNeill was drafted by the Cleveland Browns with the 37th pick in the 1949 AAFC Draft, and by the Washington Redskins with the 88th pick in the 1949 NFL Draft.
- Tony Momsen: Momsen was selected by the Los Angeles Rams with the 59th pick in the 1951 NFL draft, and played in the NFL during the 1951 and 1952 seasons.
- Bob Nussbaumer: Nussbaumer was selected by the Green Bay Packers with the 21st pick in the 1946 NFL draft and played in the NFL from 1946 to 1951.
- Joe Ponsetto: Ponsetto was selected by the Pittsburgh Pirates with the 63rd pick in the 1946 NFL Draft.
- Mike Prashaw: Prashaw was selected by the Washington Redskins with the 159th pick in the 1946 NFL Draft.
- Art Renner: Renner was selected by the Green Bay Packers with the 56th pick in the 1946 NFL Draft.
- Joe Soboleski: Soboleski was selected by the Cleveland Browns with the 192nd pick in the 1949 AAFC Draft, and by the New York Giants with the 86th pick in the 1949 NFL Draft. He played professional football in the AAFC and NFL for four years from 1949 to 1952.
- Wally Teninga: Teninga was selected by the New York Giants with the 166th pick of the 1949 NFL Draft.
- Robert Wahl: Wahl was selected by the Chicago Bears with the 159th pick in the 1949 NFL Draft.
- Jack Weisenburger: Weisenburger was selected by the Washington Redskins with the 38th pick in the 1948 NFL draft. He was also selected by the New York Yankees with the 64th pick in the 1948 AAFC Draft.

== Coaching staff ==
- Head coach: Fritz Crisler
- Assistant coaches

Backfield coach: Earl Martineau
Line coach: Biggie Munn
Ends coach: Bennie Oosterbaan
Reserves coach: Arthur Valpey
Freshmen coach: Wally Weber
Other assistant coaches: William C. Barclay (asst. coach for basketball and football teams), Ray Fisher (head baseball coach and asst. football coach), Ernest McCoy

- Trainer: Ray Roberts
- Manager: Donald MacMullan, John Tishman, Leonard Budzen (assistant), Robert Keselring (assistant)
