= 1945 Indiana Hoosiers football team =

American college football season

1945 Indiana Hoosiers football

Big Ten champion
- Conference: Big Ten Conference

Ranking
- AP: No. 4
- Record: 9–0–1 (5–0–1 Big Ten)
- Head coach: Bo McMillin (12th season)
- MVP: Howie Brown
- Captain: Russ Deal
- Home stadium: Memorial Stadium

1945 Big Ten Conference football standings
| | Conf. | | | | | Overall |
| Team | W | | L | | T | W | | L | | T |
|---|---|---|---|---|---|---|---|---|---|---|
| No. 4 Indiana $ | 5 | – | 0 | – | 1 | 9 | – | 0 | – | 1 |
| No. 6 Michigan | 5 | – | 1 | – | 0 | 7 | – | 3 | – | 0 |
| No. 12 Ohio State | 5 | – | 2 | – | 0 | 7 | – | 2 | – | 0 |
| Northwestern | 3 | – | 3 | – | 1 | 4 | – | 4 | – | 1 |
| Purdue | 3 | – | 3 | – | 0 | 7 | – | 3 | – | 0 |
| Wisconsin | 2 | – | 3 | – | 1 | 3 | – | 4 | – | 2 |
| Illinois | 1 | – | 4 | – | 1 | 2 | – | 6 | – | 1 |
| Minnesota | 1 | – | 5 | – | 0 | 4 | – | 5 | – | 0 |
| Iowa | 1 | – | 5 | – | 0 | 2 | – | 7 | – | 0 |
$ – Conference champion; Rankings from AP Poll

The 1945 Indiana Hoosiers football team was an American football team that represented Indiana University Bloomington in the 1945 Big Ten Conference football season. It compiled the first undefeated record and won the first Big Ten Conference championship in the program's history. Indiana would not win another Big Ten championship until 1967, or completed another undefeated season until 2025, when they won the program's first National Championship. In their 12th year under head coach Bo McMillin, the Hoosiers compiled a 9–0–1 record (5–0–1 Big Ten), outscored their opponents by a combined total of 279 to 56, and finished the season ranked #4 in the final AP Poll. The lone blemish on the team's record was a 7–7 tie with Northwestern in the second game of the season.

Head coach Bo McMillin was selected as the Coach of the Year by his fellow college football coaches. Four Hoosier players also received first-team honors on either the 1945 All-America Team or the 1945 All-Big Ten Conference football team. End Bob Ravensberg was a consensus first-team All-American, while fullback Pete Pihos received first-team All-American honors from Yank, the Army Weekly. Freshman halfback George Taliaferro rushed for 719 yards (the first African-American player to lead the Big Ten in rushing) and received second-team All-American honors. Pihos, Taliaferro, and end Ted Kluszewski also received first-team All-Big Ten honors. Pihos, Taliaferro, and coach McMilllin were later inducted into the College Football Hall of Fame.

Quarterback Ben Raimondi led the team in passing, completing 35 of 83 passes for 593 yards and 10 touchdowns with three interceptions. Mel Groomes was the team's leading receiver with 12 catches for 223 yards. In 1948, Groomes became the first African-American player to sign with the Detroit Lions.

== Before the season ==
The 1944 Indiana football team compiled a 7–3 record and finished in fifth place in the Big Ten Conference. Players lost from the 1944 team included John Tavener, who was the consensus first-team center on the 1944 All-America Team. Bob Meyer was expected to fill Tavener's spot in the middle of the line, but he suffered a broken leg in the 1945 season opener against Michigan. John Cannady, who had previously been a fullback and linebacker, eventually won the job.

Another loss from the 1944 team was halfback Robert Hoernschemeyer. Hoernschemeyer was a second-team All-Big Ten player in 1944, but he entered the Naval Academy after the 1944 season, played for the Navy Cadets in 1945, and then played 10 years of professional football.

On the other hand, several players returned from military service in time for the 1945 season. Most prominent among these were Pete Pihos and Howie Brown. Pihos was a lieutenant in the 35th Infantry Division, and Brown received three Purple Heart citations for his service in the European Theater of Operations. Neither had been discharged when the season began, but they were granted 60-day leaves by the Army and returned in time for the second game of the season against Northwestern.

== Schedule ==
| Date | Opponent | Rank | Site | Result | Attendance |
|---|---|---|---|---|---|
| September 22 | at Michigan | | Michigan Stadium; Ann Arbor, MI | W 13–7 | 27,536 |
| September 29 | at Northwestern | | Dyche Stadium; Evanston, IL | T 7–7 | 30,000 |
| October 6 | at Illinois | | Memorial Stadium; Champaign, IL (rivalry) | W 6–0 | 25,173 |
| October 13 | Nebraska* | No. 8 | Memorial Stadium; Bloomington, IN | W 54–14 | 20,000 |
| October 20 | at Iowa | No. 8 | Iowa Stadium; Iowa City, IA | W 52–20 | 15,800 |
| October 27 | No. 14 Tulsa* | No. 8 | Memorial Stadium; Bloomington, IN | W 7–2 | 20,000 |
| November 3 | Cornell (IA)* | No. 5 | Memorial Stadium; Bloomington, IN | W 46–6 | 6,000 |
| November 10 | at No. 20 Minnesota | No. 6 | Memorial Stadium; Minneapolis, MN | W 49–0 | 41,400 |
| November 17 | at Pittsburgh* | No. 4 | Pitt Stadium; Pittsburgh, PA | W 19–0 | 5,000 |
| November 24 | No. 18 Purdue | No. 4 | Memorial Stadium; Bloomington, IN (Old Oaken Bucket) | W 26–0 | 27,000–28,000 |
*Non-conference game; Rankings from AP Poll released prior to the game

== Rankings ==
Ranking movements Legend: ██ Increase in ranking ██ Decrease in ranking ( ) = First-place votes
| | Week | | | | | | | | |
| Poll | 1 | 2 | 3 | 4 | 5 | 6 | 7 | 8 | Final |
|---|---|---|---|---|---|---|---|---|---|
| AP | 8 | 8 | 8 | 5 | 6 (3) | 4 | 4 | 4 (1) | 4 |

== Game summaries ==
=== Week 1: at Michigan ===
Week 1: Indiana at Michigan

| Team | 1 | 2 | 3 | 4 | Total |
|---|---|---|---|---|---|
| • Indiana | 6 | 7 | 0 | 0 | 13 |
| Michigan | 0 | 0 | 7 | 0 | 7 |

- Date: September 22, 1945
- Location: Michigan Stadium
  Ann Arbor, Michigan
- Game attendance: 27,536
- Referee: Wm. A. Blake

On September 22, 1945, Indiana opened its season with a 13–7 victory over Michigan. Indiana scored a touchdown in the first quarter on a pass from Ben Raimondi to Ted Kluszewski, but Kluszeweski's kick for extra point went wide. In the second quarter, the Hoosiers scored again on a touchdown pass from Raimondi to Mel Groomes that covered 56 yards, including 34 yards of Groomes running down the sideline. Kluszewski's extra point kick was successful, and Indiana led 13–0 at halftime. In his first college football game, freshman halfback George Taliaferro rushed for 95 yards on 20 carries.

Indiana's starting lineup against Michigan was Bob Ravensberg (left end), Russ Deal (left tackle), Frank Ciolli (left guard), Bob Meyer (center), Joe Sowinski (right guard), Jon Goldsberry (right tackle), Kluszewski (right end), Raimondi (quarterback), Taliaferro (left halfback), Groomes (right halfback), and Nick Lysohir (fullback).

=== Week 2: at Northwestern ===
Week 2: Indiana at Northwestern

| Team | 1 | 2 | 3 | 4 | Total |
|---|---|---|---|---|---|
| Indiana | 0 | 0 | 0 | 7 | 7 |
| Northwestern | 7 | 0 | 0 | 0 | 7 |

- Date: September 29, 1945
- Location: Dyche Stadium
  Evanston, Illinois
- Game attendance: 30,000
- Referee: Rollie Barnum

On September 29, 1945, Indiana and Northwestern played to a 7–7 tie in Evanston, Illinois. Northwestern end Stan Gorski recovered a blocked punt in the end zone midway through the first quarter to give Northwestern a 7–0 lead. Northwestern held the lead until late in the fourth quarter when Ben Raimondi threw a four-yard touchdown pass to Pete Pihos. Pihos dragged three Northwestern defenders with him into the end zone. George Taliaferro rushed for 56 yards on 19 attempts. In all, Indiana gained 152 rushing yards and 133 passing yards.

Indiana's starting lineup against Northwestern was Bob Ravensberg (left end), Russ Deal (left tackle), Joe Sowinski (left guard), Oleksak (center), Frank Ciolli (right guard), Jon Goldsberry (right tackle), Ted Kluszewski (right end), Raimondi (quarterback), Taliaferro (left halfback), Dick Deranek (right halfback), and Nick Lysohir (fullback).

=== Week 3: at Illinois ===
Week 3: Indiana at Illinois

| Team | 1 | 2 | 3 | 4 | Total |
|---|---|---|---|---|---|
| • Indiana | 0 | 0 | 0 | 6 | 6 |
| Illinois | 0 | 0 | 0 | 0 | 0 |

- Date: October 6, 1945
- Location: Memorial Stadium, Champaign, Illinois
- Game attendance: 25,173
- Referee: William A. Blake

On October 6, 1945, Indiana defeated Illinois by a 6–0 score in Champaign, Illinois. In the second quarter, Mel Groomes threw a touchdown pass to Ted Kluszewski, but the play was called back because a Great Dane dog had gotten loose on the field during the play. In the third quarter, the Hoosiers moved the ball to the Illinois one-yard line, but the Illinois defense held. The Hoosiers did not score until the fourth quarter when Ben Raimondi threw a touchdown pass to Kluszewski. Defensively, the Chicago Tribune described Pete Pihos as a "demon", and the Hoosiers held the Illini to 113 rushing yards and 35 passing yards. Offensively, the Hoosiers gained 200 rushing yards and 41 passing yards.

Indiana's starting lineup against Illinois was Bob Ravensberg (left end), Russ Deal (left tackle), Joe Sowinski (left guard), John Cannady (center), Howie Brown (right guard), Jon Goldsberry (right tackle), Kluszewski (right end), Raimondi (quarterback), George Taliaferro (left halfback), Groomes (right halfback), and Pihos (fullback).

=== Game 4: Nebraska ===
Week 4: Nebraska at Indiana

| Team | 1 | 2 | 3 | 4 | Total |
|---|---|---|---|---|---|
| Nebraska | 0 | 0 | 7 | 7 | 14 |
| • Indiana | 6 | 21 | 14 | 13 | 54 |

- Date: October 13, 1945
- Location: Memorial Stadium
  Bloomington, Indiana
- Game attendance: 20,000
- Referee: Ted O'Sullivan

On October 13, 1945, the Hoosiers defeated Nebraska by a 54–14 score at Memorial Stadium in Bloomington. Indiana's eight touchdowns were scored by Dick Deranek, Pete Pihos, Mel Groomes, Bob Ravensberg, Bob Miller (95-yard kickoff return to start the second half), Bill Armstrong (2), and Tom Schwartz. The Hoosiers gained 417 yards in the game, 272 rushing yards and 145 passing yards. Defensively, the Hoosiers held the Cornhuskers to 79 rushing yards and 117 passing yards.

Indiana's starting lineup against Nebraska was Ravensberg (left end), Russ Deal (left tackle), Joe Sowinski (left guard), Allan Horn (center), Frank Ciolli (right guard), Jon Goldsberry (right tackle), Lou Mihajlovich (right end), Ben Raimondi (quarterback), George Taliaferro (left halfback), Deranek (right halfback), and Pihos (fullback).

=== Week 5: at Iowa ===
Week 5: Indiana at Iowa

| Team | 1 | 2 | 3 | 4 | Total |
|---|---|---|---|---|---|
| • Indiana | 20 | 20 | 12 | 0 | 52 |
| Iowa | 0 | 0 | 0 | 20 | 20 |

- Date: October 20, 1945
- Location: Iowa City, Iowa
- Game attendance: 15,800

On October 20, 1945, Indiana defeated Iowa by a 52–20 score in Iowa City. Indiana's first touchdown was scored on a 20-yard interception return by Bob Ravensberg. Less than two minutes later, Ravensberg scored again when he recovered a blocked punt in the end zone. George Taliaferro had two long touchdown runs of 62 and 74 yards. Bill Armstrong ran 43 yards for Indiana's fifth touchdown, and Dick Deranek scored on a reverse around Iowa's right end to give the Hoosiers a 40–0 lead at halftime. In the third quarter, Indiana scored twice, on a short pass from Ben Raimondi to John Gorski and on a long pass from Raimondi to Deranek covering 48 yards. Indiana led 52–0 at the end of the third quarter and had allowed Iowa only two first downs. In the fourth quarter, Iowa scored 20 points against the Hoosier reserves. Indiana totaled 337 rushing yards and 94 passing yards, and held Iowa to 115 rushing yards and 134 passing yards.

Indiana's starting lineup against Iowa was Ravensberg (left end), Russ Deal (left tackle), Joe Sowinski (left guard), Allan Horn (center), Howie Brown (right guard), Jon Goldsberry (right tackle), Lou Mihajlovich (right end), Raimondi (quarterback), Taliaferro (left halfback), Mel Groomes (right halfback), and Pete Pihos (fullback).

=== Game 6: Tulsa ===
Week 6: Tulsa at Indiana

| Team | 1 | 2 | 3 | 4 | Total |
|---|---|---|---|---|---|
| Tulsa | 0 | 0 | 2 | 0 | 2 |
| • Indiana | 0 | 7 | 0 | 0 | 7 |

- Date: October 27, 1945
- Location: Memorial Stadium
  Bloomington, Indiana
- Game attendance: 20,000

On October 27, 1945, the Hoosiers defeated a previously undefeated Tulsa team by a 7–2 score at Memorial Stadium in Bloomington. Tulsa captain Charles Stanley was ejected from the game in the first quarter for "using a knee on" Indiana's African-American halfback George Taliaferro. The Hoosiers sole touchdown came on a 60-yard sweep around left end; after a 20-yard gain, Pete Pihos lateraled the ball to Bob Ravensberg who ran the rest of the way. In the third quarter, the Hoosiers were pinned deep in their own territory by a Hardy Brown punt, and after a penalty pushed them back further, George Taliaferro was tackled behind the goal line for a safety. Indiana rushed for 224 yards in the game and held Tulsa to 80 rushing yards and five passing yards.

Indiana's starting lineup against Tulsa was Bob Ravensberg (left end), Russ Deal (left tackle), Joe Sowinski (left guard), John Cannady (center), Howie Brown (right guard), Jon Goldsberry (right tackle), Ted Kluszewski (right end), Ben Raimondi (quarterback), George Taliaferro (left halfback), Mel Groomes (right halfback), and Pete Pihos (fullback).

=== Game 7: Cornell ===
Week 7: Cornell at Indiana

| Team | 1 | 2 | 3 | 4 | Total |
|---|---|---|---|---|---|
| Cornell (IA) | 0 | 0 | 0 | 6 | 6 |
| • Indiana | 14 | 13 | 12 | 7 | 46 |

- Date: November 3, 1945
- Location: Memorial Stadium
  Bloomington, Indiana
- Game attendance: 6,000
- Referee: Mike Layden

On November 3, 1945, the Hoosiers defeated the Cornell College team by a 46–6 score at Memorial Stadium in Bloomington. Dick Deranek scored three touchdowns for Indiana. Additional touchdowns were scored by Pete Pihos, George Taliaferro, Leroy Stovall, and William Buckner. Carl Anderson served as the acting head coach for the game, while head coach Bo McMillin scouted the Michigan-Minnesota game in Ann Arbor.

Indiana's starting lineup against Cornell was Bob Ravensberg (left end), Russ Deal (left tackle), Joe Sowinski (left guard), John Cannady (center), Howie Brown (right guard), Jon Goldsberry (right tackle), Lou Mihajlovich (right end), Ben Raimondi (quarterback), George Taliaferro (left halfback), Mel Groomes (right halfback), and Pete Pihos (fullback).

=== Week 8: at Minnesota ===
Week 8: Indiana at Minnesota

| Team | 1 | 2 | 3 | 4 | Total |
|---|---|---|---|---|---|
| • Indiana | 7 | 28 | 14 | 0 | 49 |
| Minnesota | 0 | 0 | 0 | 0 | 0 |

- Date: November 10, 1945
- Location: Minneapolis
- Game attendance: 41,400
- Referee: Rollie Barnum

On November 10, 1945, Indiana limited Bernie Bierman's Minnesota Golden Gophers to 20 rushing yards and won by a 49–0 score at Minneapolis. George Taliaferro returned the opening kickoff 95 yards and scored three touchdowns in a game that the Chicago Tribune called "the most decisive licking any Minnesota team ever has received." Indiana scored its 49 points in the first three quarters, 28 of them in the second quarter, before turning the game over to its deep reserves. All 34 players on Indiana's traveling squad appeared in the game. Additional Indiana touchdowns were scored by Bob Miller, Pete Pihos, Dick Deranek, and Tom Schwartz. Indiana gained 245 rushing yards and 123 passing yards while holding Minnesota to 20 rushing yards and 90 passing yards.

Indiana's starting lineup against Minnesota was Bob Ravensberg (left end), Russ Deal (left tackle), Joe Sowinski (left guard), John Cannady (center), Howie Brown (right guard), Jon Goldsberry (right tackle), Ted Kluszewski (right end), Ben Raimondi (quarterback), Taliaferro (left halfback), Mel Groomes (right halfback), and Pihos (fullback).

=== Week 9: at Pittsburgh ===
Week 9: Indiana at Pittsburgh

| Team | 1 | 2 | 3 | 4 | Total |
|---|---|---|---|---|---|
| • Indiana | 6 | 0 | 13 | 0 | 19 |
| Pittsburgh | 0 | 0 | 0 | 0 | 0 |

- Date: November 17, 1945
- Location: Pittsburgh
- Game attendance: 5,000

On November 17, 1945, Indiana defeated Pittsburgh by a 19–0 score in Pittsburgh. Fullback Pete Pihos scored two touchdowns, and Bob Ravensberg also scored a touchdown on a pass from Ben Raimondi. Indiana gained 192 rushing yards and held Pittsburgh to only 18 rushing yards.

Indiana's starting lineup against Pittsburgh was Ravensberg (left end), Russ Deal (left tackle), Joe Sowinski (left guard), John Cannady (center), Howie Brown (right guard), Jon Goldsberry (right tackle), Ted Kluszewski (right end), Raimondi (quarterback), George Taliaferro (left halfback), Mel Groomes (right halfback), and Pihos (fullback).

=== Game 10: Purdue ===
Week 10: Purdue at Indiana

| Team | 1 | 2 | 3 | 4 | Total |
|---|---|---|---|---|---|
| Purdue | 0 | 0 | 0 | 0 | 0 |
| • Indiana | 0 | 0 | 13 | 13 | 26 |

- Date: November 24, 1945
- Location: Memorial Stadium
  Bloomington, Indiana
- Game attendance: 27,000

On November 24, 1945, the Hoosiers defeated Purdue by a 26–0 score at Memorial Stadium in Bloomington. With the victory, the Hoosiers claimed both the Old Oaken Bucket trophy and the first Big Ten Conference football championship in school history. After a scoreless first half, Pete Pihos scored two touchdowns in the third quarter. In the fourth quarter, Ben Raimondi threw touchdown passes to Ted Kluszewski and Lou Mihajlovich. The Hoosiers gained 349 rushing yards in the game. On defense, Indiana held Purdue's touted passing offense led by quarterback Bob DeMoss to one two-yard completion in 15 attempts. After the game, Indiana University president Herman B Wells congratulated the team in the locker room and declared the following Monday to be a holiday with no classes to be held.

Indiana's starting lineup against Purdue was Bob Ravensberg (left end), Russ Deal (left tackle), Joe Sowinski (left guard), John Cannady (center), Howie Brown (right guard), Jon Goldsberry (right tackle), Kluszewski (right end), Raimondi (quarterback), George Taliaferro (left halfback), Mel Groomes (right halfback), and Pihos (fullback).

== After the season ==
The Associated Press released the results of its final poll on December 4, 1945. The 1945 Army Cadets football team was selected as the national champion with 1,160 points and first-place votes by 115 of 116 voters. Indiana was ranked fourth with 720 points.

Indiana head coach Bo McMillin was selected in voting by his fellow college football coaches as the 1945 "Coach of the Year". McMillin received 445 points and 63 first-place votes out of 155 ballots cast. Army's Earl Blaik finished second with 212 points and 28 first-place votes.

Several Indiana players also won post-season honors. These include:

- End Bob Ravensberg was selected as a consensus first-team player on the 1945 All-America Team, receiving first-team honors from Look magazine, The Sporting News, and the Football Writers Association of America. He also received second-team All-American honors and second-team All-Big Ten honors from the United Press (UP).
- Fullback Pete Pihos received first-team All-American honors from Yank, the Army Weekly, and second-team All-American honors from the UP, Associated Press (AP), and The Sporting News. He also received first-team All-Big Ten honors from both the AP and UP. Pihos also finished eighth in the voting for the 1945 Heisman Trophy. He was later inducted into both the College Football Hall of Fame and the Pro Football Hall of Fame.
- Freshman halfback George Taliaferro led the Big Ten with 719 rushing yards on 156 carries (4.6 yards per carry), becoming the first African-American player to lead the conference in rushing yardage. He received second-team All-American honors from the Central Press, International News Service (INS), and The Sporting News. He also received third-team All-American honors from the AP and first-team All-Big Ten honors from both the AP and UP. Taliaferro was later inducted in the College Football Hall of Fame.
- End Ted Kluszewski received first-team All-Big Ten from both the AP and UP. Kluszewski went on to play in Major League Baseball for 15 years.
- Tackle Jon Goldsberry received second-team All-Big Ten from the UP.

== Personnel ==
=== Varsity letter winners ===
The following 25 players received varsity letters for their participation on the 1945 Indiana football team. Players who started at least half of the team's ten games are displayed in bold.

- Bill Armstrong, #12
- Charlie Armstrong, #72
- **Howie Brown**, #73 – started 7 games at right guard
- **John Cannady**, #38 – started 5 games at center
- Frank Ciolli, #62 – started 1 game at left guard, 2 games at right guard
- **Russ Deal**, #67 – started all 10 games at left tackle
- Dick Deranek, #88 – started 2 games at right halfback
- **Jon Goldsberry**, #78 – started all 10 games at right tackle
- **Mel Groomes**, #57 – started 8 games at right halfback
- Bob Harbison, #64
- Allan Horn, #50 – started 2 games at center
- **Ted Kluszewski**, #83 – started 7 games at right end
- John Kokos, #43
- Nick Lysohir, #33 – started first 2 games at fullback
- Bob Meyer, #22 – started one game at center
- Lou Mihajlovich, #81 – started 3 games at right end
- Bob Miller, #10
- **Pete Pihos** – started final 8 games at fullback
- **Ben Raimondi**, #46 – started all 10 games at quarterback
- **Bob Ravensberg**, #61 – started all 10 games at left end
- Tom Schwartz, #82
- Nick Sebek, #25
- **Joe Sowinski** -started all 10 games, one at right guard and nine at left guard
- Leroy Stovall
- **George Taliaferro**, #44 – started all 10 games at left halfback

=== Reserves ===
- Jack Adams, #11
- Bill Bradley
- William Buckner
- Joe Gilliam Sr., #41
- John Gorski, #62
- Hagmann, #75
- Don Jones, #40
- Robert Joseph, #76
- Pat Kane, #87
- Larry Napolitan
- Francis Oleksak, #54 – started one game at center

=== Players in the NFL ===
Eleven players from the 1945 Indiana football team were either drafted to play or actually played in the National Football League. They are:

1. Pete Pihos was selected by the Philadelphia Eagles with the 41st pick in the 1945 NFL draft. He played nine years for the Eagles from 1947 to 1955 and was later inducted into the Pro Football Hall of Fame.
2. Howie Brown was selected by the Green Bay Packers with the 206th pick in the 1946 NFL draft. He played for the Detroit Lions from 1948 to 1950.
3. John Cannady was selected by the New York Giants with the 22nd pick in the 1947 NFL draft. He played eight seasons with the Giants from 1947 to 1954.
4. Ben Raimondi was selected by the Chicago Cardinals with the 41st pick in the 1947 NFL Draft. He played for the New York Yankees (AAFC) in 1947.
5. Bob Ravensberg was selected by the Cardinals with the 150th pick in the 1947 NFL Draft. He played for the Cardinals in 1948 and 1949.
6. Dick Deranek was selected by the Pittsburgh Steelers with the 82nd pick in the 1948 NFL draft, but did not play in the NFL.
7. Mel Groomes was undrafted in 1948. Indiana head coach Bo McMillin became head coach and general manager of the Detroit Lions in 1948. One of McMillin's first personnel moves was signing Groomes to a contract with the Lions on April 17, 1948. At the time, only one other NFL team, the Los Angeles Rams, had an African-American player, and Groomes was the first African-American to sign a contract with the Detroit Lions. Groomes played for the Lions in 1948 and 1949.
8. Lou Mihajlovich was undrafted in 1948, but went on to play for the Los Angeles Dons in 1948 and the Green Bay Packers in 1954.
9. Jon Goldsberry was selected by the Cardinals with the 40th pick in the 1949 NFL draft. Goldsberry played for the Cardinals in 1949 and 1950.
10. George Taliaferro was selected by the Chicago Bears with the 129th pick in the 1949 NFL Draft. He played seven years in the NFL from 1949 to 1955.
11. Nick Sebek was selected by the Washington Redskins with the 248th pick in the 1949 NFL Draft. He played for the Redskins in 1950.

In addition, Ted Kluszewski went on to play 15 seasons in Major League Baseball.

=== Coaches and administrators ===
- Head coach: Bo McMillin
- Assistant coaches: Carl Anderson (backfield), Tim Temerario (tackles, guards, centers), Charles McDaniel (reserves), John Kovatch (ends), Paul "Pooch" Harrell (scout), Gordon Fisher (reserves)
- Athletic director: Zora Clevenger
