= 1945 Ohio State Buckeyes football team =

American college football season

1945 Ohio State Buckeyes football
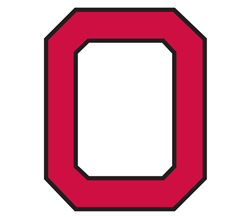
- Conference: Big Ten Conference

Ranking
- AP: No. 12
- Record: 7–2 (5–2 Big Ten)
- Head coach: Carroll Widdoes (2nd season)
- MVP: Ollie Cline
- Home stadium: Ohio Stadium

1945 Big Ten Conference football standings
	Conf.					Overall
Team	W		L		T	W		L		T
No. 4 Indiana $	5	–	0	–	1	9	–	0	–	1
No. 6 Michigan	5	–	1	–	0	7	–	3	–	0
No. 12 Ohio State	5	–	2	–	0	7	–	2	–	0
Northwestern	3	–	3	–	1	4	–	4	–	1
Purdue	3	–	3	–	0	7	–	3	–	0
Wisconsin	2	–	3	–	1	3	–	4	–	2
Illinois	1	–	4	–	1	2	–	6	–	1
Minnesota	1	–	5	–	0	4	–	5	–	0
Iowa	1	–	5	–	0	2	–	7	–	0
$ – Conference champion; Rankings from AP Poll

The 1945 Ohio State Buckeyes football team was an American football team that represented Ohio State University in the Big Ten Conference during the 1945 Big Ten Conference football season. In their second season under head coach Carroll Widdoes, the Buckeyes compiled a 7–2 record (5–2 against Big Ten opponents), finished in third place in the Big Ten, outscored opponents by a total of 194 to 71, and was ranked No. 12 in the final AP Poll.

The Buckeyes ranked ninth nationally in rushing offense with an average of 237 yards per game. The ground attack was led by fullback Ollie Cline who ranked third in the nation with 931 rushing yards, an average of 5.44 yards per carry.

Three Ohio State players received first-team honors from the Associated Press (AP) or United Press (UP) on the 1945 All-Big Ten Conference football team: Ollie Cline at fullback (AP-1, UP-1); Russ Thomas at tackle (AP-1, UP-1); and Warren Amling at guard (AP-1, UP-1).

The 1944 Ohio State team had compiled an undefeated 9–0 record and won the Big Ten championship. Between the 1944 and 1945 seasons, the Buckeyes had a winning streak of 12 games that ended with a loss to Purdue on October 20, 1945.

== Schedule ==
Date	Opponent	Rank	Site	Result	Attendance	Source
September 29	Missouri*		Ohio Stadium; Columbus, OH	W 47–6	41,299	
October 6	Iowa		Ohio Stadium; Columbus, OH	W 42–0	49,342	
October 13	Wisconsin	No. 4	Ohio Stadium; Columbus, OH	W 12–0	69,235	
October 20	No. 9 Purdue	No. 4	Ohio Stadium; Columbus, OH	L 13–35	73,585	
October 27	at Minnesota	No. 12	Memorial Stadium; Minneapolis, MN	W 20–7	56,040	
November 3	No. 20 Northwestern	No. 6	Ohio Stadium; Columbus, OH	W 16–14	74,079	
November 10	at Pittsburgh*	No. 8	Pitt Stadium; Pittsburgh, PA	W 14–0	18,000–20,000	
November 17	Illinois	No. 9	Ohio Stadium; Columbus, OH (Illibuck)	W 27–2	70,287	
November 24	at No. 8 Michigan	No. 7	Michigan Stadium; Ann Arbor, MI (rivalry)	L 3–7	85,200	
*Non-conference game; Rankings from AP Poll released prior to the game

== Rankings ==
Ranking movements Legend: ██ Increase in ranking ██ Decrease in ranking ( ) = First-place votes
	Week								
Poll	1	2	3	4	5	6	7	8	Final
AP	4 (3)	4 (1)	12	6	8	9	7	12	12

== Game summaries ==
=== Pittsburgh ===
Statistics

- Rushing: Oliver Cline 229 yards

== Coaching staff ==
- Carroll Widdoes, head coach, second year
- Sam T. Selby, assistant

== 1946 NFL draftees ==
Player	Round	Pick	Position	NFL club
Russ Thomas	3	22	Tackle	Detroit Lions
Joe Whisler	8	70	Back	Los Angeles Rams
Thornton Dixon	10	87	Tackle	Detroit Lions
Warren Amling	11	95	Guard	New York Giants
Tom Phillips	11	100	Back	Los Angeles Rams
George Slusser	30	288	Back	Philadelphia Eagles
