= 1945 Wisconsin Badgers football team =

American college football season

1945 Wisconsin Badgers football
- Conference: Big Ten Conference
- Record: 3–4–2 (2–3–1 Big Ten)
- Head coach: Harry Stuhldreher (10th season)
- MVP: Clarence Esser
- Captain: Jack Mead
- Home stadium: Camp Randall Stadium

1945 Big Ten Conference football standings
	Conf.					Overall
Team	W		L		T	W		L		T
No. 4 Indiana $	5	–	0	–	1	9	–	0	–	1
No. 6 Michigan	5	–	1	–	0	7	–	3	–	0
No. 12 Ohio State	5	–	2	–	0	7	–	2	–	0
Northwestern	3	–	3	–	1	4	–	4	–	1
Purdue	3	–	3	–	0	7	–	3	–	0
Wisconsin	2	–	3	–	1	3	–	4	–	2
Illinois	1	–	4	–	1	2	–	6	–	1
Minnesota	1	–	5	–	0	4	–	5	–	0
Iowa	1	–	5	–	0	2	–	7	–	0
$ – Conference champion; Rankings from AP Poll

The 1945 Wisconsin Badgers football team was an American football team that represented the University of Wisconsin in the 1945 Big Ten Conference football season. The team compiled a 3–4–2 record (2–3–1 against conference opponents) and finished in sixth place in the Big Ten Conference. Harry Stuhldreher was in his 10th year as Wisconsin's head coach. The team led the Big Ten with an average of 310 yards of total offense per game.

Don Kindt tied for the lead in the Big Ten with 36 points scored, and Rex Johns led the conference with an average of 40.8 yards per punt. Tackle Clarence Esser received the team's most valuable player award. Esser also received first-team honors from the Associated Press on the 1945 All-Big Ten Conference football team. Jack Mead was the team captain.

The team played its home games at Camp Randall Stadium. During the 1945 season, the average attendance at home games was 32,666.

== Schedule ==
Date	Opponent	Site	Result	Attendance	Source
September 22	at Great Lakes Navy*	Ross Field; North Chicago, IL	T 0–0		
September 29	Marquette*	Camp Randall Stadium; Madison, WI	W 40–13	37,000	
October 6	Purdue	Camp Randall Stadium; Madison, WI	L 7–13	30,000	
October 13	at No. 4 Ohio State	Ohio Stadium; Columbus, OH	L 0–12	69,235	
October 20	Illinois	Camp Randall Stadium; Madison, WI	T 7–7	33,000	
November 3	Iowa	Iowa Stadium; Iowa City, IA (rivalry)	W 27–7		
November 10	Northwestern^{†}	Camp Randall Stadium; Madison, WI	L 14–28		
November 17	at No. 2 Navy*	Municipal Stadium; Baltimore, MD	L 7–36		
November 24	at Minnesota	Memorial Stadium; Minneapolis, MN (rivalry)	W 26–12	34,800	
*Non-conference game; ^{†}Homecoming; Rankings from AP Poll released prior to the game
