= 1945 Purdue Boilermakers football team =

American college football season

1945 Purdue Boilermakers football
- Conference: Big Ten Conference
- Record: 7–3 (3–3 Big Ten)
- Head coach: Cecil Isbell (2nd season)
- MVP: Ned Maloney
- Captain: Ed Cody
- Home stadium: Ross–Ade Stadium

1945 Big Ten Conference football standings
	Conf.					Overall
Team	W		L		T	W		L		T
No. 4 Indiana $	5	–	0	–	1	9	–	0	–	1
No. 6 Michigan	5	–	1	–	0	7	–	3	–	0
No. 12 Ohio State	5	–	2	–	0	7	–	2	–	0
Northwestern	3	–	3	–	1	4	–	4	–	1
Purdue	3	–	3	–	0	7	–	3	–	0
Wisconsin	2	–	3	–	1	3	–	4	–	2
Illinois	1	–	4	–	1	2	–	6	–	1
Minnesota	1	–	5	–	0	4	–	5	–	0
Iowa	1	–	5	–	0	2	–	7	–	0
$ – Conference champion; Rankings from AP Poll

The 1945 Purdue Boilermakers football team was an American football team that represented Purdue University in the Big Ten Conference during the 1945 Big Ten Conference football season. In their second season under head coach Cecil Isbell, the Boilermakers compiled a 7–3 record (3–3 against Big Ten opponents), finished in fifth place in the conference, and outscored opponents by a total of 198 to 125.

Three Purdue players received honors from the Associated Press (AP) or United Press (UP) on the 1945 All-Big Ten Conference football team: Ed Cody at halfback (AP-1, UP-1); Tom Hughes at tackle (UP-1); and Bob DeMoss at halfback (UP-2). Cody ranked fifth nationally with 847 rushing yards, and DeMoss ranked sixth with 742 passing yards.

== Schedule ==
Date	Opponent	Rank	Site	Result	Attendance	Source
September 22	Marquette*		Ross–Ade Stadium; West Lafayette, IN	W 14–13	11,000	
September 29	at Great Lakes Navy*		Naval Station Great Lakes; North Chicago, IL	W 20–6	22,000	
October 6	at Wisconsin		Camp Randall Stadium; Madison, WI	W 13–7	30,000	
October 13	Iowa^{†}	No. 15	Ross–Ade Stadium; West Lafayette, IN	W 40–0	20,000	
October 20	at No. 4 Ohio State	No. 9	Ohio Stadium; Columbus, OH	W 35–13	73,585	
October 27	at Northwestern	No. 4	Dyche Stadium; Evanston, IL	L 14–26	42,000	
November 3	Pittsburgh*	No. 13	Ross–Ade Stadium; West Lafayette, IN	W 28–0	15,000	
November 10	Miami (OH)*	No. 12	Ross–Ade Stadium; West Lafayette, IN	W 21–7	12,000	
November 17	at No. T–14 Michigan	No. 11	Michigan Stadium; Ann Arbor, MI	L 13–27	48,528	
November 24	at No. 4 Indiana	No. 18	Memorial Stadium; Bloomington, IN (Old Oaken Bucket)	L 0–26	27,000–28,000	
*Non-conference game; ^{†}Homecoming; Rankings from AP Poll released prior to the game

== Rankings ==
Ranking movements Legend: ██ Increase in ranking ██ Decrease in ranking — = Not ranked
	Week								
Poll	1	2	3	4	5	6	7	8	Final
AP	15	9	4	13	12	11	18	—	—

== Game summaries ==
=== Marquette ===
- David Shaw 15 rushes, 116 yards

=== Iowa ===
- Bill Canfield 13 rushes, 131 yards

=== Miami (OH) ===
- Bill Canfield 17 rushes, 123 yards

== Roster ==
- Norbert Adams, HB
- Bill Canfield, QB-HB
- Ralph Clymer, G
- Ed Cody, FB
- Marv Crowe, G
- Alan Dale, G
- Bill Deem, G
- Bob DeMoss, QB
- Ernie Dobrzykowski, E
- Paul Gilbert, E
- Bob Heck, E
- Harold Holz, G
- Bill Horvath, G-E
- Tom Hughes, T
- Joe Kodba, C
- Jim Lockwood, C
- Gordon Logan, G
- Wally Lynch, G
- Ned Maloney, E
- George Mihal, FB
- Pat O'Brien, T
- Ewell O'Bryan, T
- Don Schrenk, FB
- Dave Shaw, HB
- Dick Smith, T
- Bob Whitmer, E
