= Pete Pihos =

American football player and coach (1923–2011)

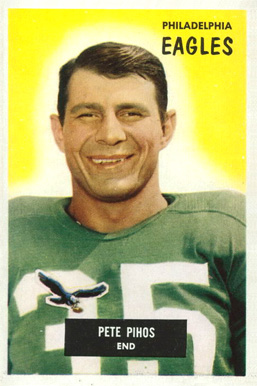
- Pihos c. 1955

No. 35
- Position: End

Personal information
- Born: October 22, 1923; Orlando, Florida, U.S.
- Died: August 16, 2011 (aged 87); Winston-Salem, North Carolina, U.S.
- Listed height: 6 ft 1 in (1.85 m)
- Listed weight: 210 lb (95 kg)

Career information
- High school: Austin (Chicago, Illinois)
- College: Indiana (1942–1943, 1945–1946)
- NFL draft: 1945: 5th round, 41st overall pick

Career history

Playing
- Philadelphia Eagles (1947–1955)

Coaching
- National Agricultural (1956–1958) Head coach; Tulane (1959–1960) Ends coach; Hammonton Bakers (1962–1963) Head coach; Richmond Rebels (1964–1965) Head coach

Awards and highlights
- 2× NFL champion (1948, 1949); 6× First-team All-Pro (1948, 1949, 1952–1955); 6× Pro Bowl (1950–1955); 3× NFL receptions leader (1953–1955) (Note: Co-leader in the 1954 season with Billy Wilson.); 2× NFL receiving yards leader (1953, 1955); NFL receiving touchdowns co-leader (1953); NFL 1940s All-Decade Team; NFL 75th Anniversary All-Time Team; Philadelphia Eagles Hall of Fame; Philadelphia Eagles 75th Anniversary Team; First-team All-American (1943); Second-team All-American (1945); 2× First-team All-Big Ten (1943, 1945); 2× Second-team All-Big Ten (1942, 1946)

Career NFL statistics
- Receptions: 373
- Receiving yards: 5,619
- Receiving touchdowns: 61
- Stats at Pro Football Reference

Head coaching record
- Career: College: 14–7–1 (.659); Professional: 15–13–1 (.534); Total: 29–20–2 (.588)
- Military career
- Allegiance: United States
- Branch: United States Army
- Service years: 1944–1946
- Rank: 2nd Lieutenant
- Unit: 35th Infantry Division
- Conflicts: World War II
- Pro Football Hall of Fame
- College Football Hall of Fame

Peter Louis Pihos (/piːhoʊs/; October 22, 1923 – August 16, 2011) was an American professional football player who was an end for the Philadelphia Eagles of the National Football League (NFL).

Pihos played college football as an end and fullback for the Indiana Hoosiers from 1942 to 1943 and 1945 to 1946. He was selected as a first-team All-American in 1942, 1943 and 1945. His college playing career was interrupted by service in the United States Army during World War II. He was inducted into the College Football Hall of Fame in 1966, the first Indiana player to be so honored.

Pihos played in the NFL for the Philadelphia Eagles from 1947 to 1955. While with the Eagles, he helped the team win back-to-back NFL championships in 1948 and 1949. He was selected six times to play in the Pro Bowl (1950–1955) and six times as a first-team All-Pro (1948, 1949, 1952–1955). During his career, he was one of the NFL's leading receivers. He was named to the NFL 1940s All-Decade Team in 1969 and inducted into the Pro Football Hall of Fame in 1970.

After his playing career was over, Pihos was the head football coach for National Agricultural College (later renamed Delaware Valley University) from 1956 to 1958. He also held coaching positions with Tulane University (assistant coach, 1959–1960) and the Richmond Rebels (head coach, 1964–1965).

== Early life ==
Pihos was born in 1923 in Orlando, Florida. His parents, Louis and Mary Pihos, were Greek immigrants. On July 31, 1937, when Pihos was 14 years old, his father, the operator of a breakfast restaurant in Orlando, was murdered. His body was discovered behind the counter of the restaurant with his skull fractured in 12 places. Police concluded he had been struck with a hatchet. A young truck driver was arrested and charged with the murder but was not convicted.

Pihos attended Orlando High School where he played football as a tackle and basketball as a guard. When he was a junior in high school, his mother moved the family to Chicago, where he attended Austin High School.

== College and World War II ==
=== 1942 and 1943 seasons ===
Pihos attended the Indiana University and played for the Indiana Hoosiers football team, first as an end in 1942 and 1943. As a sophomore in 1942, Pihos caught 17 passes for 295 yards. He scored the only touchdown in a 7–0 upset victory over the seventh-ranked Minnesota Golden Gophers, which came in the game's closing minutes and ended Minnesota's hope of a third straight Big Ten Conference title. He was named to the All-America team selected based on the votes of 1,706 fellow players, earned honorable mention on the United Press (UP) All-America team, and was a second-team selection on the UP's All-Big Ten team.

As a junior in 1943, Pihos caught 20 passes for 265 yards and four touchdowns and scored two rushing touchdowns. He led the Hoosiers to a 34–0 victory over Wisconsin; after catching a touchdown pass from Bob Hoernschemeyer in the first half, head coach Bo McMillin moved him into the backfield for the second half where he scored two rushing touchdowns. He was named a first-team All-American by Sporting News, Collier's Weekly, and The New York Sun. He was also a unanimous selection by conference coaches as a first-team end on the 1943 All-Big Nine Conference football team. On January 1, 1944, Pihos and teammate Bob Hoernschemeyer played for the East team in the East–West Shrine Game, with Hoernschemeyer throwing a touchdown pass to Pihos in a 13–13 tie game.

=== World War II ===
Pihos was drafted into the United States Army in January 1944. He served in the 35th Infantry Division under George S. Patton. Commissioned as a second lieutenant on the battlefield, he was awarded the Bronze Star and Silver Star medals for bravery. He was granted a furlough to return to Indiana University in September 1945 while awaiting his final discharge.

=== 1945 and 1946 seasons ===
When Pihos returned to Indiana after his military service, he played at the fullback position for the 1945 Indiana Hoosiers football team that compiled one of two undefeated records (9–0–1) in Indiana football history, won the program's first Big Ten Conference championship, and finished the season ranked No. 4 in the final AP Poll. He had only two days of practice before his first game back, Indiana's second game of the season, against Northwestern. He scored Indiana's only touchdown in the game, when he caught a pass at the Northwestern five-yard line and dragged three defenders with him over the goal-line. He scored the first two touchdowns in Indiana's 26–0 win over Purdue in the final game of the year. Pihos finished the season having carried the ball 92 times for 410 yards and seven touchdowns. He earned first-team All-America honors from Yank, the Army Weekly magazine, and finished eighth in voting for the Heisman Trophy.

As a senior, Pihos played three positions (fullback, halfback, and quarterback) and was named the most valuable player on the 1946 Indiana Hoosiers football team. In a show of versatility, and despite suffering from a throat infection and thigh injury during the 1946 season, he carried the ball 76 times for 262 rushing yards, completed seven of 12 passes for 84 passing yards, had ten catches for 213 receiving yards, and scored eight touchdowns. He ended his college career by scoring three touchdowns against the Purdue Boilermakers, helping the Hoosiers win the Old Oaken Bucket for that year. Pihos finished third in the voting for the Chicago Tribune Silver Football as the most valuable player in the Big Nine Conference.

In four seasons at Indiana, Pihos scored 138 points, which was then the school's all-time scoring record. He also broke Indiana career records for touchdowns and receptions. Bo McMillin, Indiana's head football coach since 1934, called Pihos "the greatest all-around football player our team has known in my time at Indiana."

== Professional football player ==
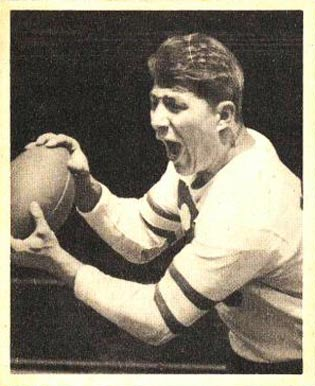
Pihos on a 1948 Bowman football card

Pihos was selected by the Philadelphia Eagles in the fifth round (41st overall pick) of the 1945 NFL draft, but he continued to play for Indiana in 1945 and 1946. In February 1947, he signed to join the Eagles after his graduation in June. In his first NFL season, he caught 23 passes for 382 yards and seven touchdowns. He also blocked a punt by Sammy Baugh and returned it 26 yards for a touchdown against the Washington Redskins.

The Eagles made it to the NFL Championship Game in each of Pihos' first three seasons with the team. In 1947, the team captured its first division championship. In the playoff game against the Pittsburgh Steelers for the Eastern Division title, Pihos blocked a punt to set up the first touchdown in the Eagles' 21–0 win. The Eagles then lost 28–21 to the Chicago Cardinals in the 1947 NFL Championship Game. Pihos caught three passes for 27 yards in that game and intercepted a pass while playing defense. The Eagles then won consecutive NFL championship games in 1948 and 1949. Pihos scored the only offensive touchdown of the 1949 championship game via a 31-yard reception in the second quarter during a heavy downpour.

Pihos' 766 receiving yards and 11 receiving touchdowns in 1948 were both the second-most in the NFL that season. He earned first-team All-Pro recognition in 1948 from United Press (UP), New York Daily News, Chicago Herald-American, and Pro Football Illustrated and in 1949 from the International News Service, UP, Associated Press, and New York Daily News. He was invited to his first of six-straight Pro Bowls after the 1950 season. In 1951, Pihos led the Eagles in receptions and receiving yards and intercepted two passes as a defensive end.

Pihos caught only 12 passes and scored only one touchdown in 1952, causing the Eagles front office to suspect he was washed up. However, he still managed to make the Pro Bowl and earn first-team All-Pro honors by the AP as a defensive end. Not willing take a pay cut and be an exclusive defensive end, he trained heavily during the off-season prior to 1953. He went on to have his greatest statistical success over the next three seasons, which were ultimately his final three; he recorded similar statistics over that three-year span (185 receptions, 2,785 yards, and 27 touchdowns) to his first six seasons (188 receptions, 2,834 yards, and 34 touchdowns). Pihos led the NFL in receptions in each of his final three seasons, in receiving yards twice, and in receiving touchdowns once. In 1953, he became the fourth different player to record a "triple crown" in receiving; he led the NFL in receptions (63), receiving yards (1,049), and receiving touchdowns (10) that season.

In November 1955, Pihos announced that the current season would be his last as a player. In his final NFL game, on December 11 against the Chicago Bears, he caught 11 passes for 114 yards. He retired after playing in the Pro Bowl that January, in which he caught four passes and scored the East's first touchdown by out-leaping defender Jack Christiansen to snag a 12-yard pass from Eddie LeBaron. During his nine seasons of play with the Eagles, Pihos missed just one game.

== Legacy ==
Pihos received numerous honors for his accomplishments as a football player. His honors include the following:

- In October 1961, he was named to the Helms Athletic Foundation's Major League Football Hall of Fame.
- In February 1966, he was elected to the College Football Hall of Fame. He was the first Indiana Hoosiers football player to receive the honor. In a halftime ceremony during the opening game of Indiana's 1966 season, the school presented Pihos with a special citation for his contribution to the university through football.
- In August 1969, as part of the NFL's 50th anniversary, the Pro Football Hall of Fame selected all-decade teams for each of the league's first five decades. Pihos was selected as an end on the NFL 1940s All-Decade Team.
- In February 1970, he was elected to the Pro Football Hall of Fame. At the induction ceremony in August 1970, a telegram was presented from Vice President Spiro Agnew calling Pihos "the golden Greek of football" and "the most durable and versatile football player" of his time.
- In 1978, Pihos was inducted into the Indiana Football Hall of Fame.
- In 1982, he was one of the inaugural inductees into the Indiana Hoosiers Hall of Fame.
- In November 1987, he was one of the 11 inaugural inductees into the Philadelphia Eagles Honor Roll.

== NFL career statistics ==
Legend
| | Won the NFL championship |
| | Led the league |
| **Bold** | Career high |

| Year | Team | Games | | Receiving | | | | |
| Year | Team | GP | GS | Rec | Yds | Avg | Lng | TD |
|---|---|---|---|---|---|---|---|---|
| 1947 | PHI | **12** | **12** | 23 | 382 | 16.6 | **66** | 7 |
| 1948 | PHI | **12** | 11 | 46 | 766 | 16.7 | 48 | **11** |
| 1949 | PHI | 11 | 9 | 34 | 484 | 14.2 | 49 | 4 |
| 1950 | PHI | **12** | **12** | 38 | 447 | 11.8 | 43 | 6 |
| 1951 | PHI | **12** | **12** | 35 | 536 | 15.3 | 38 | 5 |
| 1952 | PHI | **12** | 11 | 12 | 219 | **18.3** | 47 | 1 |
| 1953 | PHI | **12** | **12** | **63** | **1,049** | 16.7 | 59 | 10 |
| 1954 | PHI | **12** | **12** | 60 | 872 | 14.5 | 34 | 10 |
| 1955 | PHI | **12** | 10 | 62 | 864 | 13.9 | 40 | 7 |
| Career | | 107 | 101 | 373 | 5,619 | 15.1 | 66 | 61 |

== Coaching career ==
=== National Agricultural ===
In March 1956, shortly after retiring from the NFL, Pihos was hired as the head football coach at National Agricultural College (later renamed Delaware Valley University) in Doylestown, Pennsylvania. He had been an advisory coach for the college in 1955 and also taught classes in business law. He remained in the position for three years and led the 1958 National Aggies to a 5–2–1 record. His contract was not renewed after the 1958 season.

=== Tulane ===
In August 1959, Pihos was hired as an assistant coach under head coach Andy Pilney for the Tulane Green Wave football team. He was given responsibility for coaching the ends. He spent two years coaching at Tulane with the team compiling 3–6–1 records in both 1959 and 1960. In December 1960, Pihos resigned his position at Tulane.

=== Cincinnati ===
In February 1961, Pihos was hired by a group seeking to secure a professional football franchise for Cincinnati in the American Football League (AFL) for the 1962 season. He was the general manager of the enterprise and was also slated to be head coach of the proposed team. However, when the AFL announced its expansion plans for 1962, Cincinnati was not awarded a franchise.

=== Semipro and minor league football ===
In 1962 and 1963, Pihos served as the head coach of the Hammonton Bakers, a semipro football team in Hammonton, New Jersey.

In 1964, Pihos served as the head coach of the Richmond Rebels of the Atlantic Coast Football League. He remained with the Rebels in 1965 as the team joined the Continental Football League. He led the Rebels to records of 8–5–1 in 1964 and 6–8 in 1965. He stepped down as the coach of the Rebels in February 1966.

== Family and later years ==
Pihos was married four times. In May 1944, he married Dorothy Lansing at the First Methodist Chapel in Bloomington, Indiana. Pihos was at that time a private in the Army stationed at Camp Reynolds. They met while both were students at Indiana University. She became a pediatrician. They were divorced in 1949.

Pihos was next married in December 1949 to model Mary Cecile Clark, also known as Cecile Chandler. He and his second wife separated in 1965 and were divorced in 1967. He was married for a third time to Charlotte Berlings Wolfe in November 1967. His fourth marriage was to Donna Ballenger. Donna was a high school librarian. They had a daughter together named Melissa Pihos. Donna lovingly took care of him through his descent in Alzheimer's disease until he died.

After retiring from football, Pihos had a business career. As of 1970, he was a vice president of Regal Home Improvement Co. in Richmond, Virginia. In 1977, he was living in Fort Wayne, Indiana, and was employed as a vice president of Franklin National Life Insurance Co.

In 2001, Pihos was diagnosed with Alzheimer's disease. In 2004, he was victimized by a con artist who acquired Pihos' lifetime collection of sports memorabilia in exchange for $30,000 in bogus checks. He spent his last years at home with Donna and as the Alzheimer's disease worsened into the latter stages, he was at the Grace Healthcare nursing home in Winston-Salem, North Carolina. He died there at age 87 in August 2011. His neurologist opined that Pihos' dementia was caused by blows to the head during his career as a football player. Pihos was buried at Bethel United Methodist Church Cemetery in Winston-Salem.

Pihos' daughter Melissa Pihos made a series of documentary films about her father. She began in 2010 with a documentary short titled Dear Dad juxtaposing photos and footage from his days as a football player with images of him as he fought the disease. She also created Pihos: A Moving Biography, exploring aspects of her father's life and his struggle with Alzheimer's disease through film and dance. Her efforts culminated in a feature-length documentary titled Pihos: A Life in Five Movements.
