= Mel Groomes =

American football player and baseball coach (1927–1997)

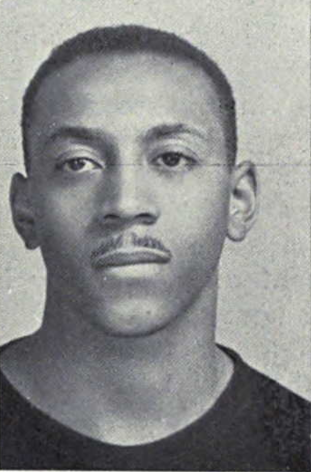
- Groomes from 1947 Indiana University yearbook

Profile
- Position: Halfback

Personal information
- Born: March 6, 1927; Trenton, New Jersey, U.S.
- Died: September 11, 1997 (aged 70); Greensboro, North Carolina, U.S.
- Listed height: 6 ft 0 in (1.83 m)
- Listed weight: 178 lb (81 kg)

Career information
- High school: Trenton (NJ) Central
- College: Indiana
- NFL draft: 1948: undrafted

Career history
- Detroit Lions (1948–1949)

Career NFL statistics
- Games: 9
- Receiving yards: 51
- Touchdowns: 1
- Stats at Pro Football Reference

Melvin Harold Groomes (March 6, 1927 – September 11, 1997) was an American professional football player and baseball coach. He played college football at Indiana University from 1944 to 1947 and helped lead the Indiana Hoosiers football team to the Big Ten Conference championship in 1945. In April 1948, he signed with the Detroit Lions, becoming the first African-American signed by the team. He played for the Lions during the 1948 and 1949 seasons and spent the next four years serving in the United States Air Force. He later spent more than 30 years, as a professor and head baseball coach, at North Carolina Agricultural and Technical State University in Greensboro, North Carolina.

== Early years and family ==
Groomes was born in Trenton, New Jersey, in 1927. He was the son of Malachi and Margaret Groomes, both of whom were natives of Virginia. At the time of the 1930 United States Census, Groomes' father was employed as a fireman for a gas company. The family was living in Trenton's fifth ward and consisted of Groomes, his parents, three step-brothers, four step-sisters, and two brothers. Groomes played halfback on the Trenton Central High School football team. He was also a competitor in track and field and set the New Jersey high school records in the high jump and the broad jump. In 1954, Groomes' younger brother, Ronald Groomes, was the first African-American to enroll in the New Jersey State Police Academy.

== Indiana University ==
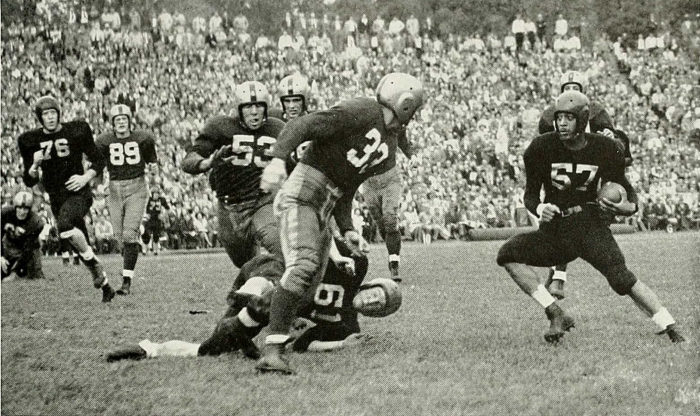
Groomes in October 1947: "READY FOR HIS MEDICINE. Mel Groomes gets ready for the plunge as Bob Ravensberg tries to bring down a potential Badger tackler in the Hoosier homecoming." (Photo and caption from the 1948 Arbutus)

Groomes enrolled at Indiana University in 1944 where he played college football and was also a member of the track and field team, specializing in the high jump. He set an Indiana freshman record in the high jump at 6 feet, 4 inches, which record stood until 1959.

Groomes was also a member of the football team from 1944 to 1947. He was a third-stringer in 1944, but established himself as the team's starting wingback during the 1945 season. Groomes and fellow African-American halfback George Taliaferro helped lead the 1945 Indiana team to the school's first-ever Big Ten Conference football championship. In the first game of the 1945 Big Ten Conference schedule, Groomes had a 54-yard touchdown reception in a 13–7 upset over Michigan.

Indiana became a leader in integrating college football in the 1940s. The 1947 team included eight African-American players, giving it "more colored gridmen than any other large squad in the country." That year, the Hoosiers upset the Ohio State Buckeyes 7–0, with the key play in the game coming on a pass from Taliaferro to Groomes that gained 63 yards. Groomes also played defensive back, and Indiana coach Bo McMillin in 1947 called Groomes "the finest defensive back" in the Big Nine Conference.

== Detroit Lions ==
In 1948, Bo McMillin left Indiana to take over as the head coach and general manager of the Detroit Lions. One of McMillin's first personnel moves was signing Groomes to a contract with the Lions on April 17, 1948. At the time, only one other NFL team, the Los Angeles Rams, had an African-American player, and Groomes was the first African-American to sign a contract with the Detroit Lions. (Bob Mann signed with the Lions one week later.) During the 1948 season, Groomes wrote a series of articles, "How It Feels To Be A Rookie In The National Football League", for a Detroit newspaper.

Groomes made his debut for the Lions on September 22, 1948, in the first game of the 1948 season against the Los Angeles Rams in the Los Angeles Memorial Coliseum. Bob Mann and Groomes both played in the game, becoming the first African-Americans to appear in a game for the Lions. Early in the game, Groomes fumbled a ball inside the Detroit 30-yard line, resulting in a Rams' touchdown. The Rams won the game, 44–7. Groomes suffered a broken wrist during the 1948 season, limiting him to six games. Groomes appeared in three more games for the Lions during the 1949 season. In his career with the Lions, Groomes caught five passes for 51 yards and one touchdown.

== Military service ==
In 1950, Groomes entered the United States Air Force. In 1951, private first class Groomes received the American Spirit Honor Medal for excelling at basic training. He played football for the football team from Bolling Field in Washington, D.C., for three years from 1951 to 1953.

== Coaching career ==
After being discharged from the military, Groomes was hired in August 1954 as the backfield coach for the football team at Howard University, historically black university located in Washington, D.C.

In 1955 Groomes was hired as an assistant football coach at North Carolina Agricultural and Technical State University, a historically black college in Greensboro, North Carolina. In 1955, he also became the head baseball coach at North Carolina A&T. Groomes remained at the school until he retired in 1987. In 31 years as the school's head baseball coach, he compiled a record of 471–224. Groomes also served as a professor and was instrumental in developing the North Carolina A&T's Health, Physical Education, and Recreation department.

== Family and death ==
Groomes and his wife, Juanita Bradley, had three daughters. Melita Rene was born in Philadelphia in May 1952, Deborah Lynn was born March 1955, and Glenna Marie was born February 1959.

In September 1997, Groomes died at age 70 at the Moses H. Cone Memorial Hospital in Greensboro. The causes of death were listed as renal failure and cardiac arrest.
