= 1945 Minnesota Golden Gophers football team =

American college football season

1945 Minnesota Golden Gophers football
- Conference: Big Ten Conference
- Record: 4–5 (1–5 Big Ten)
- Head coach: Bernie Bierman (11th season)
- MVP: Bob Fitch
- Captain: Game captains
- Home stadium: Memorial Stadium

1945 Big Ten Conference football standings
	Conf.					Overall
Team	W		L		T	W		L		T
No. 4 Indiana $	5	–	0	–	1	9	–	0	–	1
No. 6 Michigan	5	–	1	–	0	7	–	3	–	0
No. 12 Ohio State	5	–	2	–	0	7	–	2	–	0
Northwestern	3	–	3	–	1	4	–	4	–	1
Purdue	3	–	3	–	0	7	–	3	–	0
Wisconsin	2	–	3	–	1	3	–	4	–	2
Illinois	1	–	4	–	1	2	–	6	–	1
Minnesota	1	–	5	–	0	4	–	5	–	0
Iowa	1	–	5	–	0	2	–	7	–	0
$ – Conference champion; Rankings from AP Poll

The 1945 Minnesota Golden Gophers football team represented the University of Minnesota in the 1945 Big Ten Conference football season. In their 11th non-consecutive year under head coach Bernie Bierman (Bierman was not Minnesota's coach from 1942 to 1944), the Golden Gophers compiled a 4–5 record and outscored their opponents by a combined total of 177 to 55.

Tackle Bob Fitch was awarded the team's MVP award.

Total attendance for the season was 246,931, which averaged to 41,155. The season high for attendance was against Ohio State.

== Schedule ==
Date	Time	Opponent	Rank	Site	Result	Attendance	Source
September 22		Missouri*		Memorial Stadium; Minneapolis, MN	W 34–0	34,246	
October 6		at Nebraska*		Memorial Stadium; Lincoln, NE (rivalry)	W 61–7	25,000	
October 13	2:00 p.m.	Fort Warren*	No. 5	Memorial Stadium; Minneapolis, MN	W 14–0	32,465	
October 20		Northwestern^{†}	No. 5	Memorial Stadium; Minneapolis, MN	W 30–7	55,940	
October 27		No. 12 Ohio State	No. 5	Memorial Stadium; Minneapolis, MN	L 7–20	56,000	
November 3		at No. 10 Michigan	No. 16	Michigan Stadium; Ann Arbor, MI (Little Brown Jug)	L 0–26	84,472	
November 10		No. 6 Indiana	No. 20	Memorial Stadium; Minneapolis, MN	L 0–49	41,400	
November 17		at Iowa		Iowa Stadium; Iowa City, IA (rivalry)	L 19–20	13,880	
November 24		Wisconsin		Memorial Stadium; Minneapolis, MN (rivalry)	L 12–26	34,800	
*Non-conference game; ^{†}Homecoming; Rankings from AP Poll released prior to the game; All times are in Central time

== Rankings ==
Ranking movements Legend: ██ Increase in ranking ██ Decrease in ranking — = Not ranked ( ) = First-place votes
	Week								
Poll	1	2	3	4	5	6	7	8	Final
AP	5 (2)	5	5 (1)	16	20	—	—	—	—

== Game summaries ==
=== Michigan ===
Week 7: Minnesota at Michigan

Team	1	2	3	4	Total
Minnesota	0	0	0	0	0
• Michigan	7	0	0	19	26

- Date: November 3, 1945
- Location: Michigan Stadium, Ann Arbor, Michigan
- Game attendance: 85,132
- Referee: Dr. R. W. Huegel (Marquette)

On November 3, 1945, Minnesota lost to Michigan by a 26 to 0 score. Michigan's touchdowns were scored by Yerges (short run in the first quarter), fullback Jack Weisenburger (13-yard run in fourth quarter), and halfbacks Wally Teninga and Warren Bentz (12-yard pass from Don Robinson). Bob Callahan kicked two points after touchdown. Michigan gained 261 rushing yards and 131 passing yards in the game.
