= F. Stuart Wilkins =

American football player and lawyer (1928–2011)

- Wilkins cropped from 1947 Michigan football team photograph

Profile
- Position: Guard

Personal information
- Born: February 25, 1928; Canton, Ohio, U.S.
- Died: March 29, 2011 (aged 83); Canton, Ohio, U.S.
- Listed height: 5 ft 10 in (1.78 m)
- Listed weight: 186 lb (84 kg)

Career information
- High school: Lincoln High School, Canton, Ohio
- College: Michigan

Career history
- 1945–1948: Michigan

Awards and highlights
- National champion (1948)

F. Stuart "Stu" Wilkins (February 25, 1928 – March 29, 2011) was an American football player, lawyer, and businessman. He played at the guard position for the University of Michigan football team from 1945 to 1948 and was a starter on the Wolverines undefeated teams in 1947 and 1948. He practiced law for more than 50 years in Canton, Ohio. He was one of the leaders behind the establishment of the Pro Football Hall of Fame in Canton, serving on the steering committee that prepared the presentation to the NFL, and serving for more than 40 years on its board of trustees. He also served as the chairman of the board of the American Automobile Association from 1989 to 1991.

== Early life ==
Wilkins attended Lincoln High School in Canton, Ohio, where he was captain of the football team and class president during his senior year. He was selected by the Associated Press as a first-team All-Ohio tackle in 1944. In announcing the selection, the AP praised Wilkins for his blocking and defensive work and noted that, because he was only 16 years old, he would be able to play two years of college football before reaching draft age.

== University of Michigan ==
Wilkins enrolled at the University of Michigan in 1945 and played for the Michigan Wolverines football team from 1945 to 1948. Wilkins and Dominic Tomasi were the starting offensive guards for Fritz Crisler's undefeated 1947 team that became known as the "Mad Magicians" and has been selected by the ESPN Big Ten College Football Encyclopedia as the best team in the history of Michigan football. In December 1947, the Associated Press wrote that Wilkins and Tomasi were the "equal if not the best" guard combination in the country and described them as "those powerful little offensive guards who make the offense click." Wilkins also played for Bennie Oosterbaan's undefeated 1948 Michigan Wolverines football team that won an undisputed national championship.

== Legal career ==
After receiving his bachelor's degree, Wilkins attended the University of Michigan Law School and received his Juris Doctor degree. He was admitted to the bar in 1952 and began practicing law in his hometown, Canton, Ohio. Wilkins was an active lawyer in Canton for more than 50 years with a practice focusing on real estate, banking, and corporate law.

== Pro Football Hall of Fame ==
Wilkins was a charter member of the steering committee appointed to bring the Pro Football Hall of Fame to Canton. He assisted in preparing the presentation to the NFL which resulted in Canton being selected. In July 1960, he was appointed as the organization's statutory agent and a founding member of the board of trustees. He also helped raise funds to finance the museum, prepared the organization's non-profit charter, constitution and by-laws, and drafted and negotiated all of the contracts for the museum. In 1964, he received the Distinguished Service Award from the Canton Jaycees for his efforts in establishing the Hall of Fame in Canton. He was also named one of the five outstanding young men in Ohio by the Ohio Jaycees in 1964. Funds were limited for the operation of the Hall of Fame in its early years, and in the mid-1960s, Wilkins and Canton businessman, Bill Belden, had to sign a promissory note at Canton's First National Bank to enable the museum to meet its payroll.

Wilkins has remained a member of its board of trustees for more than 45 years and served as the chairman of the board from 1984 to 1997.

== Automobile Association of America ==
Wilkins also served as the vice chairman of the 30-million-member Automobile Association of America from 1987 to 1991 and the chairman for two terms from 1989 to 1991.
