= 1945 Illinois Fighting Illini football team =

American college football season

1945 Illinois Fighting Illini football
- Conference: Big Ten Conference
- Record: 2–6–1 (1–4–1 Big Ten)
- Head coach: Ray Eliot (4th season)
- MVP: Mac Wenskunas
- Captain: Ralph Serpico
- Home stadium: Memorial Stadium

1945 Big Ten Conference football standings
	Conf.					Overall
Team	W		L		T	W		L		T
No. 4 Indiana $	5	–	0	–	1	9	–	0	–	1
No. 6 Michigan	5	–	1	–	0	7	–	3	–	0
No. 12 Ohio State	5	–	2	–	0	7	–	2	–	0
Northwestern	3	–	3	–	1	4	–	4	–	1
Purdue	3	–	3	–	0	7	–	3	–	0
Wisconsin	2	–	3	–	1	3	–	4	–	2
Illinois	1	–	4	–	1	2	–	6	–	1
Minnesota	1	–	5	–	0	4	–	5	–	0
Iowa	1	–	5	–	0	2	–	7	–	0
$ – Conference champion; Rankings from AP Poll

The 1945 Illinois Fighting Illini football team was an American football team that represented the University of Illinois as a member of the Big Ten Conference during the 1945 Big Ten season. In their fourth year under head coach Ray Eliot, the Illini compiled a 2–6–1 record (1–4–1 in conference games), finished in seventh place in the Big Ten, and were outscored by a total of 104 to 93.

Center Mac Wenskunas was selected as the team's most valuable player. Other key players included tackle Alex Agase, guard Les Bingaman, and end/linebacker Jim Valek.

The team played its home games at Memorial Stadium in Champaign, Illinois.

== Schedule ==
Date	Opponent	Site	Result	Attendance	Source
September 22	Pittsburgh*	Memorial Stadium; Champaign, IL	W 23–6	9,962	
September 29	at Notre Dame*	Notre Dame Stadium; Notre Dame, IN	L 0–7	41,569	
October 6	Indiana	Memorial Stadium; Champaign, IL (rivalry)	L 0–6	25,173	
October 20	at Wisconsin	Camp Randall Stadium; Madison, WI	T 7–7	33,000	
October 27	No. 16 Michigan	Memorial Stadium; Champaign, IL (rivalry)	L 0–19	54,085–55,672	
November 3	Great Lakes Navy*	Memorial Stadium; Champaign, IL	L 6–12	14,569	
November 10	Iowa	Memorial Stadium; Champaign, IL	W 48–7	14,060	
November 17	at No. 9 Ohio State	Ohio Stadium; Columbus, OH (Illibuck)	L 2–27	70,287	
November 24	at Northwestern	Dyche Stadium; Evanston, IL (rivalry)	L 7–13	35,000	
*Non-conference game; Rankings from AP Poll released prior to the game

== Roster ==
At the end of the season, 25 players received varsity letters for their participation on the 1945 Illinois team:

1. Lou Agase, tackle, No. 89, 190 pounds, 6'1", Evanston, IL
2. Les Bingaman, guard, No. 22, 277 pounds, 6'2", Gary, IN
3. Eddie Bray, left halfback, No. 52, 145 pounds, 5'8", Utica, IL
4. George Bujan, center, No. 14, 190 pounds, 5'10", Christopher, IL
5. Bill Butkovich, quarterback, No. 22, 165 pounds, 5'8", St. David, IL
6. Jerry Cies, fullback, No. 95, 168 pounds, 5'10", Edwardsville, IL
7. Raymond Ciszek, No. 20, end, 170 pounds, 5'9", Hobart, IN
8. Robert Cunz, tackle, No. 64, 209 pounds, 5'10", DeKalb, IL
9. Larry Forst, guard, No. 81, 215 pounds, 6'2", Chicago
10. William C. Heiss, end, No. 18, 185 pounds, 6'1", Aurora, IL
11. Robert Jones, tackle, No. 51, 200 pounds, 6'3", West Frankfort, IL
12. Lester Joop, guard, No. 44, 255 pounds, 6'0", Peru, IL
13. William “Butch” Kolens, tackle, No. 45, 185 pounds, 6’0”, Waukegan, IL
14. William Krall, fullback, Gary, IN
15. Gene Kwasniewski, halfback, Evanston, IL
16. Robert Lunn, guard, No. 47, 195 pounds, 5'9", Spring Valley, IL
17. Clyde Perkins, quarterback, No. 48, 155 pounds, 5'10", St. Clair Shores, MI
18. Jack Pierce, halfback, No. 24, 160 pounds, 6'0", Pontiac, IL
19. Gerald Russ, end, No. 76, 185 pounds, 6'2", Rock Island, IL
20. Joseph Saban, fullback, La Grange, IL
21. Ralph "Babe" Serpico, tackle and captain, No. 56, 195 pounds, 5'7", Melrose Park, IL
22. Stanley Sprague, end, No. 38, 185 pounds, 6'2", Belleville, IL
23. Stan Stasica, halfback, Rockford, IL
24. Wes Tregoning, end, La Salle, IL
25. Jim Valek, end, No. 34, 168 pounds, 5'9", Joliet, IL
26. Mac Wenskunas, center/fullback, No. 23, 180 pounds, 5'10", Georgetown, IL
27. Tommy Zaborac, halfback, No. 69, 205 pounds, 6'0", Canton, IL
28. Al Zimmerman, halfback, No. 68, 157 pounds, 5'10", Chicago
