= 1945 Northwestern Wildcats football team =

American college football season

1945 Northwestern Wildcats football
- Conference: Big Ten Conference
- Record: 4–4–1 (3–3–1 Big Ten)
- Head coach: Pappy Waldorf (11th season)
- MVP: Dick Conners
- Captain: Max Morris
- Home stadium: Dyche Stadium

1945 Big Ten Conference football standings
| | Conf. | | | | | Overall |
| Team | W | | L | | T | W | | L | | T |
|---|---|---|---|---|---|---|---|---|---|---|
| No. 4 Indiana $ | 5 | – | 0 | – | 1 | 9 | – | 0 | – | 1 |
| No. 6 Michigan | 5 | – | 1 | – | 0 | 7 | – | 3 | – | 0 |
| No. 12 Ohio State | 5 | – | 2 | – | 0 | 7 | – | 2 | – | 0 |
| Northwestern | 3 | – | 3 | – | 1 | 4 | – | 4 | – | 1 |
| Purdue | 3 | – | 3 | – | 0 | 7 | – | 3 | – | 0 |
| Wisconsin | 2 | – | 3 | – | 1 | 3 | – | 4 | – | 2 |
| Illinois | 1 | – | 4 | – | 1 | 2 | – | 6 | – | 1 |
| Minnesota | 1 | – | 5 | – | 0 | 4 | – | 5 | – | 0 |
| Iowa | 1 | – | 5 | – | 0 | 2 | – | 7 | – | 0 |
$ – Conference champion; Rankings from AP Poll

The 1945 Northwestern Wildcats team was an American football team that represented Northwestern University in the Big Ten Conference during the 1945 Big Ten Conference football season. In their 11th year under head coach Pappy Waldorf, the Wildcats compiled a 4–4–1 record (3–3–1 against Big Ten opponents), finished in fourth place in the Big Ten, and were outscored by a total of 148 to 127.

Four Northwestern players received honors from the Associated Press (AP) or United Press (UP) on the 1945 All-Big Ten Conference football team: Max Morris at end (AP-1, UP-1); Jim Lecture at guard (AP-1 UP-1); Dick Conners at halfback (UP-2); and Paul Schuetz at Northwestern (UP-2). Morris was also selected as a consensus first-team All-American. Conners ranked 14th in the nation with 671 rushing yards.

== Schedule ==
| Date | Opponent | Rank | Site | Result | Attendance |
|---|---|---|---|---|---|
| September 22 | Iowa State* | | Dyche Stadium; Evanston, IL | W 18–6 | 34,725 |
| September 29 | Indiana | | Dyche Stadium; Evanston, IL | T 7–7 | 30,000 |
| October 6 | Michigan | | Dyche Stadium; Evanston, IL (rivalry) | L 7–20 | 32,772 |
| October 20 | at No. 5 Minnesota | | Memorial Stadium; Minneapolis, MN | L 7–30 | 55,940 |
| October 27 | No. 4 Purdue | | Dyche Stadium; Evanston, IL | W 26–14 | 42,000 |
| November 3 | at No. 6 Ohio State | No. 20 | Ohio Stadium; Columbus, OH | L 14–16 | 74,079 |
| November 10 | at Wisconsin | | Camp Randall Stadium; Madison, WI | W 28–14 | |
| November 17 | No. 7 Notre Dame* | | Dyche Stadium; Evanston, IL (rivalry) | L 7–34 | 46,294 |
| November 24 | Illinois | | Dyche Stadium; Evanston, IL (rivalry) | W 13–7 | 35,000 |
*Non-conference game; Rankings from AP Poll released prior to the game

== Rankings ==
Ranking movements Legend: ██ Increase in ranking ██ Decrease in ranking — = Not ranked
| | Week | | | | | | | | |
| Poll | 1 | 2 | 3 | 4 | 5 | 6 | 7 | 8 | Final |
|---|---|---|---|---|---|---|---|---|---|
| AP | — | — | — | 20 | — | — | — | — | — |
