= 1945 Iowa Hawkeyes football team =

American college football season

1945 Iowa Hawkeyes football
- Conference: Big Ten Conference
- Record: 2–7 (1–5 Big Ten)
- Head coach: Clem Crowe (1st season)
- MVP: Arthur Johnson
- Home stadium: Iowa Stadium

1945 Big Ten Conference football standings
	Conf.					Overall
Team	W		L		T	W		L		T
No. 4 Indiana $	5	–	0	–	1	9	–	0	–	1
No. 6 Michigan	5	–	1	–	0	7	–	3	–	0
No. 12 Ohio State	5	–	2	–	0	7	–	2	–	0
Northwestern	3	–	3	–	1	4	–	4	–	1
Purdue	3	–	3	–	0	7	–	3	–	0
Wisconsin	2	–	3	–	1	3	–	4	–	2
Illinois	1	–	4	–	1	2	–	6	–	1
Minnesota	1	–	5	–	0	4	–	5	–	0
Iowa	1	–	5	–	0	2	–	7	–	0
$ – Conference champion; Rankings from AP Poll

The 1945 Iowa Hawkeyes football team was an American football team that represented the University of Iowa as a member of the Big Ten Conference during the 1945 Big Ten football season. In their first and only year under head coach Clem Crowe, the Hawkeyes compiled a 2–7 record (1–5 in conference games), tied for last place in the Big Ten, and were outscored by a total of 310 to 74.

The team played its home games at Iowa Stadium (later renamed Kinnick Stadium) in Iowa City, Iowa.

== Schedule ==
Date	Opponent	Site	Result	Attendance	Source
September 29	Bergstrom Field*	Iowa Stadium; Iowa City, IA	W 14–13	10,000	
October 6	at Ohio State	Ohio Stadium; Columbus, OH	L 0–42	49,342	
October 13	at No. 15 Purdue	Ross–Ade Stadium; West Lafayette, IN	L 0–40	20,000	
October 20	No. 8 Indiana	Iowa Stadium; Iowa City, IA	L 20–52	15,800	
October 27	at No. 2 Notre Dame*	Notre Dame Stadium; Notre Dame, IN	L 0–56	42,841	
November 3	Wisconsin^{†}	Iowa Stadium; Iowa City, IA (rivalry)	L 7–27		
November 10	at Illinois	Memorial Stadium; Champaign, IL	L 7–48	14,060	
November 17	Minnesota	Iowa Stadium; Iowa City, IA (rivalry)	W 20–19	13,880	
November 24	at Nebraska*	Memorial Stadium; Lincoln, NE (rivalry)	L 6–13		
*Non-conference game; ^{†}Homecoming; Rankings from AP Poll released prior to the game
