= Carroll Widdoes =

American football coach and college athletics administrator

Biographical details
- Born: December 3, 1903; Philippines
- Died: September 22, 1971 (aged 67); Lake Worth Beach, Florida, U.S.
- Education: Otterbein College

Coaching career (HC unless noted)
- 1941–1943: Ohio State (assistant)
- 1944–1945: Ohio State
- 1946–1948: Ohio State (assistant)
- 1949–1957: Ohio

Administrative career (AD unless noted)
- 1949–1961: Ohio

Head coaching record
- Overall: 58–38–5

Accomplishments and honors

Championships
- 1 national (1944); 1 Big Ten (1944); 1 MAC (1953)

Awards
- AFCA Coach of the Year (1944)

Carroll Curtis Widdoes (December 3, 1903 – September 22, 1971) was an American college football coach and athletics administrator. He served as the head football coach at Ohio State University (1944–1945) and Ohio University (1949–1957), compiling a career head coaching record of 58–38–5. Widdoes's 1944 Ohio State team went undefeated and was retroactively named national champion by the National Championship Foundation and the Sagarin Ratings.

== Early life ==
Widdoes was the son of the Rev. and Mrs. Howard W. Widdoes. The Widdoes were missionaries to the Philippines for the United Brethren Church, a predecessor denomination of the United Methodist Church, and Carroll was born there in 1903. Carroll and his brothers and sister came to live at Otterbein in 1916.

== Coaching career ==
After graduating from Otterbein College in Westerville, Ohio in 1926, Widdoes was an assistant football coach under Paul Brown at Massillon Washington High School in Massillon, Ohio. He followed Brown to Ohio State University as an assistant and assumed the head coaching job in 1944 when Brown joined the Navy, leading the Buckeyes to an undefeated season. That season, he coached Ohio State's first Heisman Trophy winner, Les Horvath. In two seasons at Ohio State, Widdoes posted a 16–2 record. After the 1945 season, Widdoes left Ohio State, choosing his offensive coordinator, Paul Bixler, to be his successor.

Widdoes took over as head football coach at Ohio University in 1949, eventually becoming athletic director as well. In nine seasons as head coach, he led the Bobcats to a 42–36–5 record and a Mid-American Conference title in 1953.

== Later life and death ==
Widdoes retired in 1969 and moved to Lake Worth Beach, Florida. He died at his home there on September 22, 1971.

== Head coaching record ==
Year	Team	Overall	Conference	Standing	Bowl/playoffs	AP^{#}
Ohio State Buckeyes (Big Ten Conference) (1944–1945)
1944	Ohio State	9–0	6–0	1st		2
1945	Ohio State	7–2	5–2	3rd		12
Ohio State:		16–2	11–2			
Ohio Bobcats (Mid-American Conference) (1949–1957)
1949	Ohio	4–4–1	2–2–1	3rd		
1950	Ohio	6–4	2–2	3rd		
1951	Ohio	5–4–1	2–2	4th		
1952	Ohio	6–2–1	5–2	3rd		
1953	Ohio	6–2–1	5–0–1	1st		
1954	Ohio	6–3	5–2	2nd		
1955	Ohio	5–4	3–3	4th		
1956	Ohio	2–7	2–4	T–4th		
1957	Ohio	2–6–1	1–4–1	T–5th		
Ohio:		42–36–5	27–21–3			
Total:		58–38–5				
National championship Conference title Conference division title or championship game berth
^{#}Rankings from final AP Poll.
