= Jack Mead =

American football player (1921–2001)

No. 85
- Position: End

Personal information
- Born: April 18, 1921; Appleton, Wisconsin, U.S.
- Died: February 22, 2001 (aged 79)
- Listed height: 6 ft 3 in (1.91 m)
- Listed weight: 213 lb (97 kg)

Career information
- High school: West Division (Milwaukee, Wisconsin)
- College: Wisconsin
- NFL draft: 1945: 7th round, 64th overall pick

Career history
- New York Giants (1946–1947)

Career NFL statistics
- Receptions: 9
- Receiving yards: 127
- Stats at Pro Football Reference

John Michael Mead (April 18, 1921 – February 22, 2001) was an American professional football player in the National Football League (NFL). He was selected by the New York Giants in the seventh round of the 1945 NFL draft, and would later play two seasons with the team.
