= Howie Brown =

American football player (1922–1975)

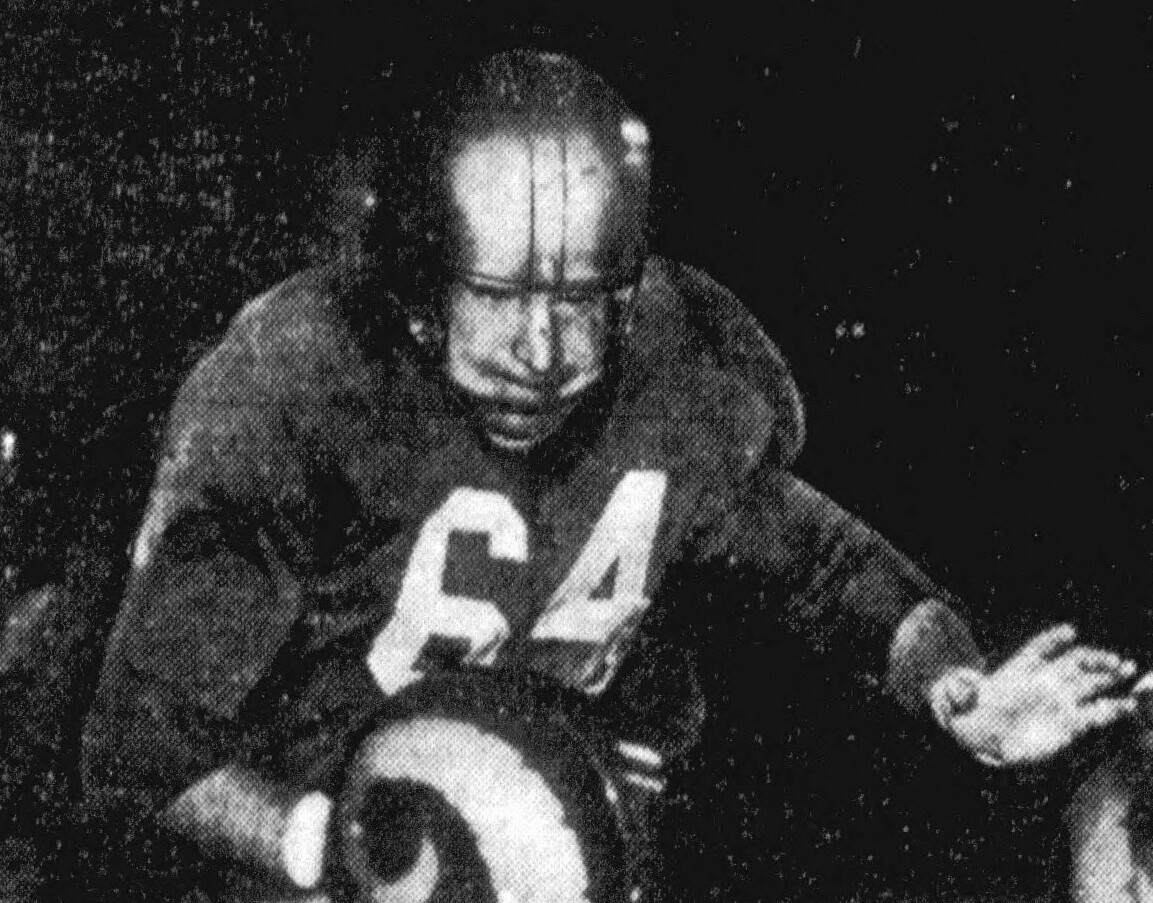
- Brown in 1949

No. 64
- Positions: Guard, tackle

Personal information
- Born: January 26, 1922; Dayton, Ohio, U.S.
- Died: April 4, 1975 (aged 53); Bloomington, Indiana, U.S.
- Listed height: 5 ft 11 in (1.80 m)
- Listed weight: 215 lb (98 kg)

Career information
- College: Indiana
- NFL draft: 1946: 22nd round, 206th overall pick

Career history
- Detroit Lions (1948–1950)

Awards and highlights
- First-team All-Big Nine (1947)

Career NFL statistics
- Games played: 36
- Games started: 34
- Fumble recoveries: 2
- Stats at Pro Football Reference

Howard Kenneth Brown (January 26, 1922 – April 4, 1975) was a guard in the National Football League (NFL). He played three seasons with the Detroit Lions.

Brown played college football at Indiana University. In college he was named to the All-Big Nine team in 1946 and 1947. He was drafted by the Green Bay Packers in the 22nd round of the 1946 NFL draft but was traded to the Lions in 1948 before playing any games for the Packers along with defensive end Bob Rennenbohm in exchange for center Frank Szymanski and offensive end/defensive back Ted Cook.
