= Harold Watts =

American football player (1925–1973)

- Watts, 1944

Michigan Wolverines
- Position: Center

Personal information
- Born: 1925; Birmingham, Michigan, U.S.
- Died: August 15, 1973
- Listed height: 5 ft 10 in (1.78 m)
- Listed weight: 176 lb (80 kg)

Career information
- High school: Birmingham
- College: University of Michigan

Career history
- 1943–1946: Michigan

Awards and highlights
- First-team All-Big Ten (1945); Most Valuable Player, 1945 Michigan Wolverines football team

Harold M. Watts (1925 – August 15, 1973) was an American college football player. He played at the center position for the University of Michigan from 1943 to 1946. He was chosen as the Most Valuable Player on the 1945 Michigan Wolverines football team and received the award in absentia after being transferred off the Michigan campus by the United States Navy and missing the final two games of the 1945 season. He was selected "by a wide margin" as the Associated Press' first-team All-Big Ten player in 1945. He was also selected as a first-team All-Big Ten player by the United Press and was the only Michigan player selected for the all-conference teams by either the AP or UP. He played all 60 minutes in the Wolverines' 1945 loss to Army at Yankee Stadium in New York. Michigan line coach Biggie Munn called Watts "pound for pound the ablest man I ever coached."
