= Ed Cody =

American football player and coach (1923–1994)

No. 17, 16
- Position: Fullback

Personal information
- Born: February 27, 1923; Newington, Connecticut, U.S.
- Died: October 16, 1994 (aged 71); Orange County, California, U.S.
- Listed height: 5 ft 10 in (1.78 m)
- Listed weight: 194 lb (88 kg)

Career information
- High school: New Britain (New Britain, Connecticut)
- College: Boston College (1942); Purdue (1944-1946)
- NFL draft: 1946: 5th round, 36th overall pick

Career history

Playing
- Green Bay Packers (1947–1948); Chicago Bears (1949–1950); Toronto Argonauts (1951)

Coaching
- Santa Barbara / UC Santa Barbara (1956–1960) Head coach; Oakland Raiders (1960) Assistant coach; San Bernardino (1962–1964) Head coach; Chicago Bears (1965–1970) Assistant coach; Southern California Sun (1974-1975) Defensive coordinator

Awards and highlights
- First-team All-Big Ten (1945)

Career NFL statistics
- Rushing yards: 346
- Rushing average: 3.7
- Receptions: 1
- Receiving yards: 2
- Total touchdowns: 3
- Stats at Pro Football Reference

Head coaching record
- Career: College: 21–15–1 (.581); Junior college: 14–12–1 (.537)

Edward Joseph "Catfoot" Cody (February 27, 1923 – October 16, 1994) was an American professional football player and coach. He played professionally in the National Football League (NFL).

== Career ==
Cody played at the collegiate level at Purdue University and Boston College, before being drafted by the Green Bay Packers in the fifth round of the 1946 NFL draft. He played fullback with Packers in 1947 and 1948, before moving to the Chicago Bears where he played fullback and defensive back in 1949 and 1950.

After retiring as a player, Cody went into coaching. He spent four seasons, from 1956 to 1959 as the head football coach at the University of California, Santa Barbara. He then moved to the professional ranks, most notably as an assistant coach with the Oakland Raiders (1960) and the Chicago Bears (1965–1970). He was the defensive coordinator for the Southern California Sun in the World Football League.

== Head coaching record ==
=== College ===
Year	Team	Overall	Conference	Standing	Bowl/playoffs
Santa Barbara / UC Santa Barbara Gauchos (California Collegiate Athletic Association) (1956–1959)
1956	Santa Barbara	5–5	2–1	T–2nd	L Citricado Bowl
1957	UC Santa Barbara	6–2	2–1	2nd	
1958	UC Santa Barbara	4–4–1	3–2	3rd	
1959	UC Santa Barbara	6–4	2–3	T–3rd	
Santa Barbara / UC Santa Barbara:		21–15–1	9–7		
Total:		21–15–1			

=== Junior college ===
Year	Team	Overall	Conference	Standing	Bowl/playoffs
San Bernardino Indians (Eastern Conference) (1962–1964)
1962	San Bernardino	3–6	3–6	T–6th	
1963	San Bernardino	6–2–1	6–2–1	3rd	
1964	San Bernardino	5–4	3–4	5th	
San Bernardino:		14–12–1	12–12–1		
Total:		14–12–1			
