= Ben Raimondi =

American football player (1925–2020)

No. 88, 31
- Position: Quarterback

Personal information
- Born: January 23, 1925; Brooklyn, New York, U.S.
- Died: April 16, 2020 (aged 95); New York, New York, U.S.
- Listed height: 5 ft 10 in (1.78 m)
- Listed weight: 175 lb (79 kg)

Career information
- High school: Erasmus Hall (Brooklyn)
- College: William & Mary (1943); Indiana (1944-1946)
- NFL draft: 1947: 6th round, 41st overall pick

Career history
- New York Yankees (1947); Richmond Rebels (1948-1949)

Awards and highlights
- Second-team All-American (1946); First-team All-Big Nine (1946)

Career AAFC statistics
- Passing yards: 54
- TD–INT: 0–0
- Passer rating: 42.1
- Stats at Pro Football Reference

Benjamin Louis Raimondi (January 23, 1925 – April 16, 2020) was an American professional football player for the All-America Football Conference (AAFC)'s New York Yankees. He played quarterback in seven games during the 1947 season. He played college football at William & Mary and Indiana.
