= Ollie Cline =

American football player (1925–2001)

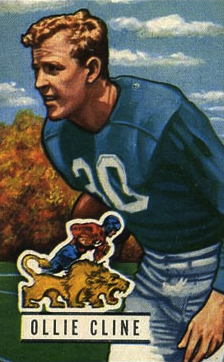
- Cline on a 1951 football card

No. 70, 30, 33
- Position: Fullback

Personal information
- Born: December 31, 1925; Mount Vernon, Ohio, U.S.
- Died: May 12, 2001 (aged 75); Springfield, Ohio, U.S.
- Listed height: 6 ft 0 in (1.83 m)
- Listed weight: 200 lb (91 kg)

Career information
- High school: Fredericktown (Fredericktown, Ohio)
- College: Ohio State (1944–1945, 1947)
- NFL draft: 1948: 14th round, 122nd overall pick

Career history
- Cleveland Browns (1948); Buffalo Bills (1949); Detroit Lions (1950–1953)

Awards and highlights
- AAFC champion (1948); 2× NFL champion (1952, 1953); Second-team All-American (1945); Chicago Tribune Silver Football (1945); First-team All-Big Ten (1945); Ohio State Varsity O Hall of Fame (2000); Ohio State Football All-Century Team (2000)

Career NFL/AAFC statistics
- Rushing yards: 1,094
- Rush average: 3.9
- Receptions: 34
- Receiving yards: 299
- Total touchdowns: 7
- Stats at Pro Football Reference

Oliver Monroe Cline (December 31, 1925 – May 12, 2001) was an American professional football player who was a fullback for the Cleveland Browns and Detroit Lions in the 1940s and 1950s. A standout high school athlete in his hometown of Fredericktown, Ohio, Cline played college football for the Ohio State Buckeyes starting in 1944. He became the football team's primary fullback that year as the school went unbeaten and was ranked second in the nation in the AP Poll. The following year, Cline was named the most valuable player in the Big Ten Conference, rushing for 936 yards as Ohio State built up a 7–2 record and was ranked 12th in the AP Poll. Following a brief stint in the U.S. Army at the end of World War II, Cline returned to Ohio State for a final season in 1947.

Cline began his professional career by signing with the Browns, a team in the All-America Football Conference (AAFC) coached by former Ohio State head coach Paul Brown. Cleveland won all of its games and the AAFC championship in 1948 while Cline served as a backup to fullback Marion Motley. Cleveland traded Cline to the Buffalo Bills, where he spent the 1949 season, and joined the Lions in 1950 when the AAFC folded. The Lions won the NFL Championship Game in 1952 and 1953, beating the Browns both times. Cline then retired from football and earned a master's degree in education. He later worked at a variety of school systems in Ohio and Arizona. Cline was inducted into the Ohio State Varsity O Hall of Fame and was named to the Ohio State Football All-Century Team in 2000. He died in 2001.

== Early life and college career ==
Cline grew up in Fredericktown, Ohio and attended the local Fredericktown High School, where he played on the football team as a back. In a 1942 game against Mount Gilead High School, he scored seven touchdowns and kicked two extra points, scoring 44 total points in a 79–6 victory.

After graduating from high school, Cline attended Ohio State University and played on the school's football team starting as a freshman in 1944. Although he was overshadowed by teammate Les Horvath, who won the Heisman Trophy that year, Cline was the team's starting fullback and ran for 221 yards on 65 carries, scoring 39 points. The Buckeyes won the Big Ten Conference championship with an undefeated 9-0 record and were ranked second in the country in the AP Poll.

The 1945 season was the most productive of Cline's college career. He led the Big Ten in rushing with 936 yards, at the time a school record, and scored nine touchdowns. Cline rushed for 229 yards in a November game against the University of Pittsburgh, setting an Ohio State single-game record that stood for 27 years until Archie Griffin broke it in 1972. The Buckeyes finished with a 7–2 record for third in the Big Ten and were ranked 12th in the AP Poll. Cline was awarded the Chicago Tribune Silver Football, given to the most valuable player in the Big Ten. He was named a second-team All-American by the Associated Press and a third-team All-American by the Football Writers Association of America.

Cline was accepted for military service before the 1945 season, but was not called up for duty until the following February. Cline, who had been passed over by the U.S. Army twice because of a punctured ear drum, was sent to Camp Atterbury, a training base in Indiana. When the war ended, Cline returned to Ohio State in 1947 and rushed for 332 yards and two touchdowns in eight games. The team finished the season with a 2–6–1 record.

== Professional career ==
Cline decided to begin his professional career in 1948 despite that he had a year of college eligibility remaining. The move upset some Ohio State supporters worried about the team's loss of talent, but Cline said he wanted to go pro because he was getting married and needed to start making money. He had been drafted by the National Football League's Chicago Bears, but signed instead with the Cleveland Browns of the All-America Football Conference (AAFC), a team coached by former Ohio State coach Paul Brown. "I plan to be married in June," Cline said at the time. "I feel I have a great opportunity with the Browns, and I've always wanted to play for Paul Brown. I feel that I have made the only logical decision." Although Brown's tenure as Ohio State coach predated Cline's career there, Brown said he had followed Cline with interest. "Ollie isn't big, as pro fullbacks go, but he can run – and I like 'em when they can run," Brown said.

In the Browns, Cline joined a team that had won the AAFC championships 1946 and 1947 behind an offensive attack that featured quarterback Otto Graham, fullback Marion Motley and ends Dante Lavelli and Mac Speedie. Serving as a backup to Motley, Cline ran for 129 yards in 1948, when Cleveland went undefeated and won the AAFC championship for the third time in a row.

Despite Cline's ties to Brown and Ohio State, Cleveland traded him to the Buffalo Bills after the season. He responded by turning in the best year of his professional career, running for 518 yards and three touchdowns. The Bills faced the Browns three times that year, tying twice and losing once in a playoff game. Buffalo finished with a 5–5–2 record and did not reach the league championship game.

The AAFC folded after the 1949 season, but three teams were merged into the NFL: the Browns, Baltimore Colts and San Francisco 49ers. With the folding of the Bills, Cline was placed in the 1950 AAFC dispersal draft and taken in the second round (No. 19 overall) by the New York Giants, but was traded by New York to the Detroit Lions for end Kelly Mote. Cline played for the Lions for four seasons. Led by quarterback Bobby Layne and halfback Doak Walker, the Lions won the NFL championship in 1952 and 1953, beating the Browns both times.

== Later career and death ==
After his playing career, Cline received a master's degree in education from Ohio's Wittenberg University in 1965. His educational career took him to posts at school systems in Springfield, Ohio, Sidney, Ohio, Mount Vernon, Ohio and Prescott, Arizona. By the early 1970s, he was principal of North Union High School in Richwood, Ohio. He also served as the dean of men at Urbana College in Urbana, Ohio. Cline was inducted into the Ohio State Varsity O Hall of Fame and named to the Ohio State Football All-Century Team in 2000. He died in 2001. His hometown of Fredericktown declared January 20, 2001 "Ollie Cline Day" in his honor.
