= Bob Ravensberg =

American football player (1925–2007)

No. 61
- Position: End

Personal information
- Born: October 20, 1925; Bellevue, Kentucky, U.S.
- Died: February 12, 2007 (aged 81); Chesterfield, Missouri, U.S.
- Listed height: 6 ft 0 in (1.83 m)
- Listed weight: 190 lb (86 kg)

Career information
- High school: Bellevue
- College: Indiana (1943-1945, 1947)
- NFL draft: 1947: 17th round, 150th overall pick

Career history
- Chicago Cardinals (1948–1949)

Awards and highlights
- Consensus All-American (1945); Second-team All-Big Ten (1945)

Career NFL statistics
- Receptions: 10
- Receiving yards: 203
- Receiving touchdowns: 3
- Stats at Pro Football Reference

Robert Alexander Ravensberg (October 20, 1925 – February 12, 2007) was an American professional football player. Ravensberg was born in Bellevue, Kentucky, where his family operated a diner. He was a two-time Kentucky high school pole vault champion who set a state record in the event. He enrolled at Indiana University on varsity letters in football in 1943, 1944, 1945 and 1947. He was a starter on Indiana's 1945 team, the school's only undefeated and outright Big Ten Conference championship team. In 1945, he was selected as a consensus first-team All-American football player at the end position. After graduating from Indiana, Ravensberg played two seasons of professional football in the National Football League (NFL) for the Chicago Cardinals from 1948 to 1949. He was an assistant football coach at Indiana from 1950 to 1951.

Ravensberg died in 2007 of complications of pneumonia at St. Luke's Hospital in Chesterfield, Missouri.
