= Dominic Tomasi =

American football player and coach (1928–1986)

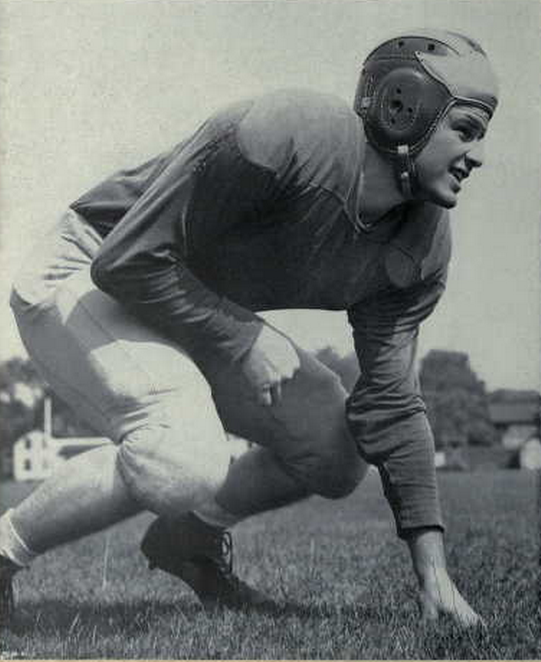
- Dominic Tomasi 1948

Profile
- Position: Guard

Personal information
- Born: February 11, 1928
- Died: December 1, 1986 (aged 58)

Career information
- High school: Flint Northern (Flint, Michigan)
- College: Michigan

Awards and highlights
- National champion (1948); 2× Third-team All-American (1947, 1948); First-team All-Big Nine (1948); 2× Second-team All-Big Nine (1946, 1947)

Dominic Tomasi (February 11, 1928 - December 1, 1986) was an American football player who played guard for the University of Michigan Wolverines. He was a four-year starter and was selected as both the captain and Most Valuable Player of the National Champion 1948 Michigan Wolverines football team.

== High school ==
A native of Flint, Michigan, Tomasi attended Flint Northern High School. In 1944, at age 16, the 5 foot, 8 inch, 178 pound Tomasi was selected by the Associated Press to its All-Michigan football team at the guard position.

== University of Michigan ==
In 1945, Tomasi enrolled at the University of Michigan where he played both football for Fritz Crisler and baseball for Ray Fischer. Tomasi was a four-year starter for the 1945, 1946, 1947 and 1948 Michigan Wolverines football teams that won 23 straight games (including undefeated seasons in 1947 and 1948), defeated USC, 49-0, in the 1948 Rose Bowl. During his sophomore year, Tomasi's photograph was published in newspapers across the country with a caption calling him "a charging block of granite for the Michigan Wolverines," and he was selected as a second-team All-Big Ten guard by the conference coaches.

Before the 1947 season got underway, one writer noted that Tomasi "is back for more and will give anyone a race for All-America honors." The 1947 Michigan Wolverines team completed the season undefeated. The Wolverines outscored their opponents 394-53, and Coach Fritz Crisler credited Tomasi "for much of his team's offensive punch." Tomasi was again named to the second-team All-Big Ten team. Tomasi's blocking in the 1948 Rose Bowl helped Michigan outscore the USC Trojans 49-0, and in March 1948, his teammates elected him to be captain of the 1948 team—the first time a guard had been selected as Michigan's captain in 33 years.

In 1948, Tomasi was both team captain and one of the top performers on Michigan's second consecutive undefeated team. In October 1948, one columnist described Tomasi's role as follows:

"As long as Michigan has operatives like Dominic Tomasi, the hard-hitting guard who captains the team, the Wolverines will give a good account of themselves. Tomasi isn't big as linemen of the Western Conference run, but he is one of the very best guards in intercollegiate circles. He stands only five, ten and weighs 180 pounds, tops, yet he has been a regular since he began playing as a 17-year-old freshman. Extremely fast, and a deadly blocker, 'Tommy' is the key man of the Wolverine offense. His ability to 'turn corners' at full speed and block with split-second precision means as much yardage to Michigan as if he were an All-America ball carrier. Tomasi is also an outstanding second baseman on Michigan's championship baseball team and his work has attracted several big league scouts. As in football, he has been a regular since 1946. He shows the same hustle and keen competitive instinct on the diamond as he does on the gridiron."

The 1948 Wolverine team was undefeated for the second consecutive season and was selected as the National Championship team in the final Associated Press poll. At the conclusion of the 1948 season, Tomasi was selected as the team's Most Valuable Player, a first-team All-Big Ten guard, and a third-team All-American by the Football Writers Association of America, and the Central Press Association and Newspaper Enterprise Association.

== Later life ==
In 1949, Tomasi passed on a chance to play professional football for the Chicago Bears and instead joined Michigan's coaching staff as a line coach. He also played baseball in the Northern loop, batting .340 and hitting 27 home runs.

He was inducted into the University of Michigan Athletic Hall of Honor in 1994.

The University of Michigan Club of Greater Flint awards an annual Dominic Tomasi Scholarship to a resident of Genesee County, Michigan who played a varsity sport and will attend the University of Michigan as a full-time undergraduate student.

== See also ==
- University of Michigan Athletic Hall of Honor
- 1948 Michigan Wolverines football team
