= Bob Callahan (American football) =

American football player (1923-2011)

- Callahan, 1946

No. 23
- Positions: Center, linebacker

Personal information
- Born: September 26, 1923; St. Louis, Missouri, U.S.
- Died: March 10, 2011 (aged 87); Laguna Woods, California, U.S.
- Listed height: 6 ft 0 in (1.83 m)
- Listed weight: 205 lb (93 kg)

Career information
- High school: Beaumont (St. Louis)
- College: Missouri (1942); Michigan (1945-1946)
- NFL draft: 1947: 31st round, 289th overall pick

Career history
- Buffalo Bills (1948)

Career AAFC statistics
- Games played: 7
- Stats at Pro Football Reference

Robert Francis Callahan (September 26, 1923 – March 10, 2011) was an American football player. He was born in St. Louis, Missouri and attended Beaumont High School where he was the captain of the football and basketball teams. He played college football as a center for the University of Missouri in 1942, but his education was interrupted by two years in the United States Marine Corps during World War II. After being discharged from the Marines, Callahan played football as a tackle and center for the University of Michigan in 1945 and 1946.

In January 1947, Callahan announced that he was leaving school and hoped to play professional football. He was drafted by the Chicago Cardinals in the 31st round (289th overall pick) of the 1947 NFL draft. He opted instead to sign with the Brooklyn Dodgers in April 1947, but he did not appear in any games. In 1948, he signed with the Buffalo Bills in the All-America Football Conference (AAFC). He appeared in seven games as a center and linebacker for the Bills during the 1948 AAFC season. Callahan died in March 2011. His last listed residence was in Orange County, California.
