= George Taliaferro =

American football player (1927–2018)

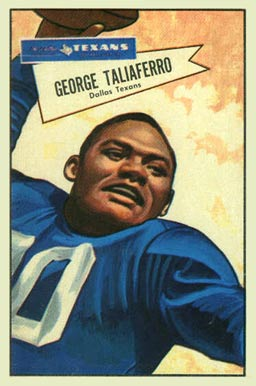
- Taliaferro on a 1952 Bowman football card

No. 93, 20, 24
- Positions: Halfback, quarterback, defensive back

Personal information
- Born: January 8, 1927; Gates, Tennessee, U.S.
- Died: October 8, 2018 (aged 91); Mason, Ohio, U.S.
- Listed height: 5 ft 11 in (1.80 m)
- Listed weight: 196 lb (89 kg)

Career information
- High school: Gary Roosevelt (Gary, Indiana)
- College: Indiana (1945–1948)
- NFL draft: 1949: 13th round, 129th overall pick

Career history
- Los Angeles Dons (1949); New York Yanks (1950–1951); Dallas Texans (1952); Baltimore Colts (1953–1954); Philadelphia Eagles (1955)

Awards and highlights
- 3× Pro Bowl (1951–1953); NFL kickoff return yards leader (1951); First-team All-American (1948); 2× Second-team All-American (1945, 1947); 2× First-team All-Big Ten (1945, 1948); Second-team All-Big Ten (1947)

Career NFL/AAFC statistics
- Rushing yards: 2,266
- Rushing average: 4.6
- Receptions: 96
- Receiving yards: 1,300
- Total touchdowns: 28
- Passing yards: 1,633
- TD-INT: 10-29
- Passer rating: 25.2
- Stats at Pro Football Reference
- College Football Hall of Fame

George Taliaferro (January 8, 1927 – October 8, 2018) was an American professional football player who was the first African American drafted by a National Football League (NFL) team. Beginning his football career at Indiana University for the Hoosiers team, he played in the NFL for the New York Yanks from 1950 to 1951, the Dallas Texans in 1952, the Baltimore Colts from 1953 to 1954, and Philadelphia Eagles in 1955.

He was the first African-American drafted into the National Football League when he was selected in the 13th round (129th pick overall) of the 1949 NFL draft. On November 22, 1953, he became the first black player to start at quarterback in the NFL in the post-color bar era when he saw emergency duty against the Los Angeles Rams.

Taliaferro was inducted into the College Football Hall of Fame in 1981.

== Early life ==
Taliaferro was born in Gates, Tennessee in 1927. Before his college years, he moved to Gary, Indiana, where he graduated from Gary Roosevelt High School.

== Career ==
=== College football ===
He would play a variety of positions for Indiana University in Bloomington, Indiana from 1945 to 1948 as halfback, quarterback, defensive back, and kicker. He struggled with prejudice of the time during his studies at Indiana that ranged from being barred from living in the dormitories to conflicting attitudes from teammates about his treatment on and off the field. While at Indiana University, Taliaferro became a member of Kappa Alpha Psi fraternity.

As the leading rusher and an All-American at Indiana University, he led the Hoosiers team to their first undefeated Big Ten Conference championship during his rookie year in 1945, and he led the conference in rushing (a first for an African American in the Big Ten) with 719 yards on 156 carries; he started his college career with 95 yards on 20 carries against Michigan as left halfback. He was inducted into the College Football Hall of Fame in 1981.

=== All-America Football Conference (AAFC) ===
Taliaferro, primarily a halfback who also punted, was selected 129th overall by the Chicago Bears in the thirteenth round of the 1949 NFL draft but instead chose to play for the Los Angeles Dons of the All-America Football Conference. This made him the first African American drafted by an NFL team.

Playing in the last season of the AAFC, Taliaferro would play in eleven of the twelve games played by the team with four starts. He would run 95 times for 472 yards with five touchdowns on the running side; in passing, he went 45-of-124 for 790 yards with four touchdowns to 14 interceptions; he also punted 27 times for 982 yards while being blocked twice. He also made 15 combined kick and punt returns for 366 total yards and one touchdown. He was named to the 2nd Team of the All-AAFC Team by the league and various press sources.

=== National Football League (NFL) ===
Colts halfback George Taliaferro runs the ball in the team's franchise debut, Sept. 27, 1953.

When the AAFC was disassembled in 1950, Taliaferro moved to the NFL, signing with the New York Yanks. Playing at halfback for the Yanks, Taliaferro started every game of the 1950 campaign. He rushed 88 times for 411 yards with four touchdowns while catching 21 passes for 299 yards and five touchdowns. He also threw seven passes and completed three for a touchdown and 83 yards while making 34 combined returns on punt and kicks for over 500 yards (he was also plagued with 11 fumbles with five recoveries). He led the team in rushing and receiving touchdowns.

Taliaferro and the Yanks were derailed by erratic circumstances for 1951, in which they had just four home games due to the tenants of Yankee Stadium forcing them out in the opening weeks of the season. Despite sub-optimal conditions for the franchise, Taliaferro would have his first of two 100-yard rushing performances in 1951. He ran 12 times for 166 yards for two touchdowns while throwing 3-of-5 for 83 yards with a touchdown pass to provide all the points in a 48–21 loss to the Los Angeles Rams.

For the year, Taliaferro would rush 62 yards for 330 yards with three touchdowns while catching 16 passes for 230 yards and two touchdowns. Passing the football as a single wing halfback, Taliaferro went 13-for-33 for 251 yards and one touchdown against three interceptions. He also punted 76 times for 2,881 yards (37.9 yards average) with one blocked kick. He returned a league high 27 kicks for 622 yards. Defensively he snared four interceptions — the only season where he recorded an interception. He was named to the Pro Bowl that season alongside teammates Mike McCormack and Brad Ecklund. After the Yanks went under, a Dallas-based group acquired the assets of the team and moved them to Dallas as the Dallas Texans.

The 1952 season was a debacle for the Texans, resulting in only one win and the transfer of the team to Baltimore at the end of the season. Taliaferro still managed to thrive, rushing 100 times for 419 yards with one touchdown while catching 21 passes for 244 yards and an additional TD. As a single wing halfback he also threw 16-of-63 for 298 combined yards with two touchdown to six interceptions. In recognition of his efforts, Taliaferro was named to the 1953 Pro Bowl alongside his teammate John Wozniak while having a 2nd Team award from the Associated Press.

The 1953 season was Taliaferro's third in three seasons, as the ashes of the Dallas franchise were picked up for a team in Baltimore. He would play in eleven games and rush for career highs in 102 carries for 479 yards while having two touchdowns and 20 catches for 346 yards for two touchdowns. He would also make appearances at quarterback, mostly during the latter part of a seven-game losing streak to end the season, with most of his passes (15-of-55 for 211 yards) coming there, and he threw two touchdowns to five interceptions.

On November 22, 1953, Taliaferro became the first black player to start at quarterback in the NFL in the years after the fall of the league's color bar. In his first time playing the position in his five-year professional career, Thrust into action by the injury of Colts QB Freddy Enke, Taliaferro posted his second and final 100-yard rushing game, running for 136 yards on sixteen carries for one touchdown in the 21–13 loss to the Rams. Taliaferro's passing was less than stellar, however, with the Colt quarterback going just 6-for-21 with 2 costly interceptions.

For the third time, Taliaferro finished the season in the top ten in rushing yards in the league as well as rushing yards per game. He also led the league in fumbles, however, with ten. Alongside teammates Art Donovan, Dick Barwegen, and Tom Keane, he was named to the Pro Bowl for his third and final time.

The year 1954 represented Taliaferro's last full season. He started in nine games that year while running 48 times for 157 yards with no touchdowns. He also caught 14 passes for 122 yards and one touchdown while throwing two passes for one interception.

Taliaferro moved on to the Philadelphia Eagles the following year. He made brief appearances in three games and rushed three times for -2 yards while making three catches for 17 yards.

== NFL/AAFC career statistics ==
Legend
**Bold**	Career high

Year	Team	Games		Rushing					Receiving				
Year	Team	GP	GS	Att	Yds	Avg	Lng	TD	Rec	Yds	Avg	Lng	TD
1949	LAD	11	4	95	472	5.0	-	**5**	1	42	42.0	42	1
1950	NYY	12	12	88	411	4.7	44	4	**21**	299	14.2	43	**5**
1951	NYY	12	5	62	330	**5.3**	**65**	3	16	230	14.4	47	2
1952	DTX	12	12	100	419	4.2	38	1	21	244	11.6	**78**	1
1953	BAL	11	11	**102**	**479**	4.7	50	2	20	**346**	**17.3**	54	2
1954	BAL	11	9	48	157	3.3	29	0	14	122	8.7	29	1
1955	PHI	3	0	3	-2	-0.7	-	0	3	17	5.7	14	0
		72	53	498	2,266	4.6	65	15	96	1,300	13.7	78	12

== Personal life ==
A documentary about Taliaferro, titled Indiana Legends: George Taliaferro, was produced by WTIU public television in Bloomington, Indiana. In later years he became a volunteer with Big Brothers Big Sisters of Baltimore, advised prisoners adjusting to society upon their release, got his master's in social work at Howard University, taught at Maryland, was dean of students at Morgan State, returned to Indiana as a professor and special assistant to IU president John Ryan, and helped start Big Brothers Big Sisters of South Central Indiana in Bloomington. In 1972, George moved to Bloomington with his wife Viola and their four children. In the fall of 1975, Viola entered the Indiana University School of Law and obtained a doctorate in law in 1977, and began private practice in family and criminal law. In 1989, Ms. Taliaferro was appointed as a judge of the Monroe Circuit Court. In 1995, she was appointed as a judge of the Seventh Court of the Monroe Circuit. Viola Taliaferro retired in 2004. George remained a sports fan as well as an avid golfer throughout his days at Indiana University as well his retirement.

== Death ==
Taliaferro died at age 91 on October 8, 2018, in Mason, Ohio, from heart failure having left his longtime home of Bloomington, Indiana, a year earlier.

== See also ==
- Racial issues faced by black quarterbacks
