= 1945 All-Big Ten Conference football team =

American college football all-star team

The 1945 All-Big Ten Conference football team consists of American football players selected to the All-Big Ten Conference teams selected by the Associated Press (AP) and United Press (UP) for the 1945 Big Ten Conference football season. The UP released the point total for each player in its polling; each player's UP point total is listed below.

== All Big-Ten selections ==
=== Ends ===
- Max Morris, Northwestern (AP-1; UP-1 [80 points])
- Ted Kluszewski, Indiana (AP-1; UP-1 [60 points])
- Bob Ravensberg, Indiana (AP-2; UP-2 [50 points])
- Bob Carley, Minnesota (AP-2; UP-2 [20 points])

=== Tackles ===
- Russ Thomas, Ohio State (AP-1; UP-1 [60 points])
- Clarence Esser, Wisconsin (AP-1; UP-2 [35 points])
- Tom Hughes, Purdue (AP-2; UP-1 [40 points])
- John Goldsberry, Indiana (UP-2 [15 points])
- Thornton Dison, Ohio State (AP-2)

=== Guards ===
- Warren Amling, Ohio State (AP-1; UP-1 [85 points])
- Jim Lecture, Northwestern (AP-1; UP-1 [40 points])
- Les Bingaman, Illinois (AP-2; UP-2 [35 points])
- Paul Schuetz, Northwestern (AP-2; UP-2 [25 points])

=== Centers ===
- Harold Watts, Michigan (AP-1; UP-1 [60 points])
- Dick Van Dusen, Minnesota (UP-2 [15 points])
- John Cannady, Indiana (AP-2)

=== Quarterbacks ===
- Pete Pihos, Indiana (AP-1; UP-1 [50 points])
- Joe Ponsetto, Michigan (AP-2; UP-2 [35 points])

=== Halfbacks ===
- George Taliaferro, Indiana (AP-1; UP-1 [55 points])
- Ed Cody, Purdue (AP-1; UP-1 [60 points])
- Dick Connors, Northwestern (AP-2; UP-2 [40 points])
- Bob DeMoss, Purdue (AP-2; UP-2 [35 points])

=== Fullbacks ===
- Ollie Cline, Ohio State (AP-1; UP-1 [80 points])
- Dick Fisher, Ohio State (AP-2; UP-2 [50 points])

== Key ==
AP = Associated Press

UP = United Press

Bold = Consensus first-team selection of both the AP and UPI

== See also ==
- 1945 College Football All-America Team
