= 1946 Big Nine Conference football season =

- Sport: Football
- Number of teams: 9
- Top draft pick: Vic Schwall
- Champion: Illinois
- Season MVP: Alex Agase

Football seasons
- ← 1945 1947 →

1946 Big Nine Conference football standings
	Conf.					Overall
Team	W		L		T	W		L		T
No. 5 Illinois $	6	–	1	–	0	8	–	2	–	0
No. 6 Michigan	5	–	1	–	1	6	–	2	–	1
No. 20 Indiana	4	–	2	–	0	6	–	3	–	0
Iowa	3	–	3	–	0	5	–	4	–	0
Minnesota	3	–	4	–	0	5	–	4	–	0
Ohio State	2	–	3	–	1	4	–	3	–	2
Northwestern	2	–	3	–	1	4	–	4	–	1
Wisconsin	2	–	5	–	0	4	–	5	–	0
Purdue	0	–	5	–	1	2	–	6	–	1
$ – Conference champion; Rankings from AP Poll

The 1946 Big Nine Conference football season was the 51st season of college football played by the member schools of the Big Nine Conference (also known as the Big Ten Conference and the Western Conference) and was a part of the 1946 college football season.

The 1946 Illinois Fighting Illini football team, under head coach Ray Eliot, won the Big Nine championship, compiled an 8–2 record, was ranked No. 5 in the final AP Poll, and defeated UCLA, 45–14, in the 1947 Rose Bowl. Illinois guard Alex Agase was a consensus first-team All-American and received the Chicago Tribune Silver Football trophy as the most valuable player in the conference.

Michigan, under head coach Fritz Crisler, compiled a 6-2-1 record, led the conference in both scoring offense (25.9 points per game) and scoring defense (8.1 points allowed per game), and was ranked No. 6 in the final AP Poll. The team's two losses came against No. 2 Army and No. 5 Illinois. Halfback Bob Chappuis received the team's most valuable player award.

Indiana, under head coach Bo McMillin, compiled a 6–3 record, finished third in the conference, and was ranked No. 20 in the final AP Poll. End Pete Pihos received the team's most valuable player award. Quarterback Ben Raimondi won first team All-Big Nine honors.

== Season overview ==
=== Results and team statistics ===
Conf. Rank	Team	Head coach	AP final	AP high	Overall record	Conf. record	PPG	PAG	MVP
1	Illinois	Ray Eliot	#5	#5	8–2	6–1	21.7	10.5	Alex Agase
2	Michigan	Fritz Crisler	#6	#4	6–2–1	5–1–1	25.9	8.1	Bob Chappuis
3	Indiana	Bo McMillin	#20	#18	6–3	4–2	14.3	10.6	Pete Pihos
4	Iowa	Eddie Anderson	NR	#16	5–4	3–3	14.3	10.2	Bill Kay
5	Minnesota	Bernie Bierman	NR	NR	5–4	3–4	14.4	12.7	Bill Bye
6 (tie)	Ohio State	Paul Bixler	NR	#12	4–3–2	2–3–1	18.4	18.9	Cecil Souders
6 (tie)	Northwestern	Pappy Waldorf	NR	#6	4–4–1	2–3–1	17.3	15.1	Ed Hirsch
8	Wisconsin	Harry Stuhldreher	NR	#15	4–5	2–5	15.6	16.0	Fred Negus
9	Purdue	Cecil Isbell	NR	NR	2–6–1	0–5–1	10.8	23.1	Norman Maloney

Key
AP final = Team's rank in the final AP Poll of the 1946 season
AP high = Team's highest rank in the AP Poll throughout the 1946 season
PPG = Average of points scored per game
PAG = Average of points allowed per game
MVP = Most valuable player as voted by players on each team as part of the voting process to determine the winner of the Chicago Tribune Silver Football trophy

=== Bowl games ===
In 1946, the Big Nine dropped its long-standing ban on participation in bowl games. Conference champion Illinois accepted an invitation to play UCLA in the 1947 Rose Bowl. The Illini defeated the Bruins by a 45–14 score. Buddy Young scored two touchdowns for Illinois, and Russ Steger returned an interception 68 yards for a touchdown.

== All-Big Nine players ==
The following players were picked by the Associated Press (AP) and/or the United Press (UP) as first-team players on the 1946 All-Big Nine Conference football team.

Position	Name	Team	Selectors
End	Elmer Madar	Michigan	AP, UP
End	Cecil Souders	Ohio State	AP
End	Ike Owens	Illinois	UP
Tackle	Russ Deal	Indiana	AP, UP
Tackle	Warren Amling	Ohio State	AP
Tackle	Jack Carpenter	Michigan	UP
Guard	Alex Agase	Illinois	AP, UP
Guard	Dick Barwegen	Purdue	AP
Guard	Earl Banks	Iowa	UP
Center	John Cannady	Indiana	AP
Center	Fred Negus	Wisconsin	UP
Quarterback	Ben Raimondi	Indiana	AP, UP
Halfback	Bob Chappuis	Michigan	AP, UP
Halfback	Vic Schwall	Northwestern	AP, UP
Fullback	Dick Hoerner	Iowa	AP
Fullback	Joe Whisler	Ohio State	UP

== All-Americans ==
At the end of the 1946 season, Big Nine players secured two of the consensus first-team picks for the 1946 College Football All-America Team. The Big Nine's consensus All-Americans were:

Position	Name	Team	Selectors
Guard	Alex Agase	Illinois	AAB, AFCA, AP, INS, NEA, TSN, UP, CP, WCFF)
Tackle	Warren Amling	Ohio State	FWAA, INS, NEA, TSN, UP, CP

Other Big Nine players who were named first-team All-Americans by at least one selector were:

Position	Name	Team	Selectors
End	Elmer Madar	Michigan	AP
Guard	Ed Hirsch	Northwestern	CP

== 1947 NFL draft ==
The following Big Nine players were among the first 100 picks of the 1947 NFL draft:

Name	Position	Team	Round	Overall pick
Vic Schwall	Halfback	Northwestern	1	10
Don Kindt	Back	Wisconsin	1	11
Russ Thomas	Tackle	Ohio State	2	12
John Cannady	Center	Indiana	3	22
Bob Chappuis	Back	Michigan	5	26
Frank Aschenbrenner	Back	Northwestern	6	38
Ben Raimondi	Back	Indiana	6	41
Dick Connors	Back	Northwestern	7	52
George Maddock	Tackle	Northwestern	8	60
Art Dufelmeier	Back	Illinois	9	70
Dwight Eddleman	Back	Illinois	9	75
Bump Elliott	Back	Michigan	10	76
Alex Sarkisian	Center	Northwestern	11	91
Russ Steger	Back	Illinois	11	93
Robert Hoernschemeyer	Back	Indiana	11	93
