= 1947 New York Giants season =

NFL team 23rd season

- Owner: Tim Mara
- General manager: Ray Walsh
- Head coach: Steve Owen
- Home stadium: Polo Grounds

Results
- Record: 2–8–2
- Division place: 5th NFL Eastern
- Playoffs: Did not qualify

The 1947 New York Giants season was the franchise's 23rd season in the National Football League. The season was a very poor one, with the Giants finishing with a record of 2–8–2, worst in the NFL.

The 1947 season was also unlucrative to team owner Tim Mara, with a payroll ballooning to $286,000 — nearly triple that of just two years previously — while facing stiff competition at the gate from the New York Yankees of the rival All-America Football Conference (AAFC).

== NFL draft ==
1947 New York Giants draft
Round	Pick	Player	Position	College	Notes
1	10	Vic Schwall	HB	Northwestern	Played with the Chicago Cardinals
3	22	John Cannady *	C	Indiana	
5	34	Nelson Greene	T	Tulsa	
6	44	Bob Davis	T	Georgia Tech	
7	54	Duke Iversen	B	Oregon	
8	64	Frank Muehlheuser	FB	Colgate	Played with the Boston Yanks
9	74	John Novitsky	T	Oklahoma City	
10	84	Fred Mullis	B	Chattanooga	
11	94	Robert Hoernschemeyer *	B	Navy	Played with the Chicago Rockets (AAFC)
12	104	Hardy Brown *	LB	Tulsa	
13	114	Bill Hachten	G	Stanford	
14	124	Herschel "Ug" Fuson	B	Army	
15	134	John Fallon	T	Notre Dame	
16	144	Bob Orlando	G	Colgate	
17	154	Frank Pulattie	B	SMU	
18	164	Dick Brinkley	B	Wake Forest	
19	174	Frank Guess	B	Texas	
20	184	Tom Landry * ^{†}	DB	Texas	Played with the Giants 1950–55, HOF coach
21	194	Joe Ponsetto	B	Michigan	
22	204	Art Donovan * ^{†}	DT	Boston College	Didn't play pro-football until 1950
23	214	Hal Shoener	E	Iowa	
24	224	Bill Moll	B	Connecticut	
25	234	Dick Thomas	G	Mississippi Southern	
26	244	Ralph Stewart	C	Missouri	played with the New York Yankees (AAFC)
27	254	George Bibighaus	E	Muhlenberg	
28	264	Jim Carrington	G	Navy	
29	274	Claude Harrison	B	South Carolina	
30	284	John Wright	B	Maryland	
31	292	Bill Schuler	T	Yale	
32	300	Don Clayton	B	North Carolina	
Made roster † Pro Football Hall of Fame * Made at least one Pro Bowl during career

== Schedule ==
Week	Date	Opponent	Result	Record	Venue	Attendance	Recap
1	Bye						
2	September 29	at **Boston Yanks**	**T** 7–7	0–0–1	Fenway Park		Recap
3	October 5	at **Philadelphia Eagles**	**L** 0–23	0–1–1	Shibe Park		Recap
4	October 12	at **Washington Redskins**	**L** 20–28	0–2–1	Griffith Stadium		Recap
5	October 19	**Boston Yanks**	**L** 0–14	0–3–1	Polo Grounds		Recap
6	October 26	**Pittsburgh Steelers**	**L** 21–38	0–4–1	Polo Grounds		Recap
7	November 2	at Detroit Lions	**L** 7–35	0–5–1	Briggs Stadium		Recap
8	November 9	**Philadelphia Eagles**	**L** 24–41	0–6–1	Polo Grounds		Recap
9	November 16	at **Pittsburgh Steelers**	**L** 7–24	0–7–1	Forbes Field		Recap
10	November 23	Green Bay Packers	**T** 24–24	0–7–2	Polo Grounds		Recap
11	November 30	**Chicago Cardinals**	**W** 35–31	1–7–2	Polo Grounds		Recap
12	December 7	**Washington Redskins**	**W** 35–10	2–7–2	Polo Grounds		Recap
13	December 14	at Los Angeles Rams	**L** 10–34	2–8–2	Los Angeles Memorial Coliseum		Recap
Note: Intra-division opponents are in **bold** text.

== Standings ==
NFL Eastern Division
	W	L	T	PCT	DIV	PF	PA	STK
Philadelphia Eagles	8	4	0	.667	6–2	308	242	W1
Pittsburgh Steelers	8	4	0	.667	6–2	240	259	W1
Boston Yanks	4	7	1	.364	3–4–1	168	256	L2
Washington Redskins	4	8	0	.333	3–5	295	367	W1
New York Giants	2	8	2	.200	1–6–1	190	309	L1

Note: Tie games were not officially counted in the standings until 1972.

== Roster ==
1947 New York Giants final roster
Backs: 42 Jim Blumenstock FB; 17 George Cheverko RB/CB; 40 Art Faircloth RB/S; 37 George Franck RB/CB; 41 Paul Governali RB; 22 Duke Iversen RB; 10 Howie Livingston CB/RB; 31 Bill Miklich RB; 44 Frank Reagan S/P/RB; 35 Gene Roberts RB; 21 Joe Sulaitis RB/CB; Ends/Receivers: 81 Jim Lee Howell; 88 Frank Liebel; 85 Jack Mead; 82 Ray Poole	Linemen/Linebackers: 20 John Cannady MLB/C; 90 Vic Carroll DT/T/WR; 79 Tex Coulter T/DT/WR; 67 Bob Dobelstein MG/G; 51 Chet Gladchuk OLB/C; 66 Bill Hachten G/MG; 65 Kayo Lunday G/MG; 57 Lou Palazzi C; 71 Phil Ragazzo T/DT; 75 Bill Schuler T; 62 George Tobin G/MG; 70 John Treadaway DT/T; 77 Jim White DT/T; 60 Len Younce G/OLB	Special teams: 50 Ken Strong K; Reserve list: 1 Frank Cope DT/T (IR); 55 Lou DeFilippo C/LB (IR); 46 Jerry Niles RB (IR); rookies in italics

== See also ==
- List of New York Giants seasons
