= 1946 Michigan Wolverines football team =

American college football season

1946 Michigan Wolverines football
- Conference: Big Nine Conference

Ranking
- AP: No. 6
- Record: 6–2–1 (5–1–1 Big Nine)
- Head coach: Fritz Crisler (9th season)
- Offensive scheme: Single-wing
- MVP: Bob Chappuis
- Captain: Art Renner
- Home stadium: Michigan Stadium

1946 Big Nine Conference football standings
	Conf.					Overall
Team	W		L		T	W		L		T
No. 5 Illinois $	6	–	1	–	0	8	–	2	–	0
No. 6 Michigan	5	–	1	–	1	6	–	2	–	1
No. 20 Indiana	4	–	2	–	0	6	–	3	–	0
Iowa	3	–	3	–	0	5	–	4	–	0
Minnesota	3	–	4	–	0	5	–	4	–	0
Ohio State	2	–	3	–	1	4	–	3	–	2
Northwestern	2	–	3	–	1	4	–	4	–	1
Wisconsin	2	–	5	–	0	4	–	5	–	0
Purdue	0	–	5	–	1	2	–	6	–	1
$ – Conference champion; Rankings from AP Poll

The 1946 Michigan Wolverines football team represented the University of Michigan in the 1946 Big Nine Conference football season. In their ninth year under head coach was Fritz Crisler, the Wolverines compiled a 6–2–1 record (5–1–1 Big Nine), outscored opponents 233 to 73, and finished the season in second place in the Big Nine Conference and ranked No. 6 in the final 1946 AP poll. The team's two losses came against an undefeated Army team that was ranked No. 2 in the final AP poll and against an Illinois team that won the Big Nine championship and was ranked No. 5 in the final AP poll. Michigan won its last four games by a combined score of 162 to 19, starting a 25-game winning streak that continued for nearly three years until October 8, 1949. In the final game of the 1946 season, Michigan defeated Ohio State, 58–6, the Buckeyes' worst defeat since joining the conference in 1913.

Halfback Bob Chappuis passed for 735 yards, the most since Benny Friedman set the school record with 760 passing yards in 1925. Chappuis also rushed for 548 yards, received second-team All-American and first-team All-Big Nine honors, and was selected as Michigan's Most Valuable Player for the 1946 season. Chappuis also ranked fifth nationally with 1,265 yards of total offense (531 rushing, 734 passing).

The only Michigan player to receive first-team All-American honors in 1946 was end Elmer Madar. Center Jim Brieske was the team's leading scorer with 32 points having kicked 29 points after touchdown and one field goal. Bob Mann led the team in touchdowns with five. End Art Renner was the team captain.

== Schedule ==
Date	Opponent	Rank	Site	Result	Attendance
September 28	Indiana		Michigan Stadium; Ann Arbor, MI	W 21–0	71,660
October 5	Iowa		Michigan Stadium; Ann Arbor, MI	W 14–7	56,515
October 12	No. 2 Army*	No. 4	Michigan Stadium; Ann Arbor, MI	L 13–20	85,938
October 19	No. 10 Northwestern	No. 5	Michigan Stadium; Ann Arbor, MI (rivalry)	T 14–14	74,089
October 26	Illinois^{†}	No. 8	Michigan Stadium; Ann Arbor, MI (rivalry)	L 9–13	85,938
November 2	at Minnesota	No. 13	Memorial Stadium; Minneapolis, MN (Little Brown Jug)	W 21–0	58,476
November 9	Michigan State*	No. 11	Michigan Stadium; Ann Arbor, MI (rivalry)	W 55–7	76,373
November 16	Wisconsin	No. 10	Michigan Stadium; Ann Arbor, MI	W 28–6	64,085
November 23	at Ohio State	No. 8	Ohio Stadium; Columbus, OH (rivalry)	W 58–6	79,735
*Non-conference game; ^{†}Homecoming; Rankings from AP Poll released prior to the game

== Rankings ==
Ranking movements Legend: ██ Increase in ranking ██ Decrease in ranking т = Tied with team above or below
	Week								
Poll	1	2	3	4	5	6	7	8	Final
AP	4	5	8т	13	11	10	8	6	6

== Season summary ==
=== Pre-season ===
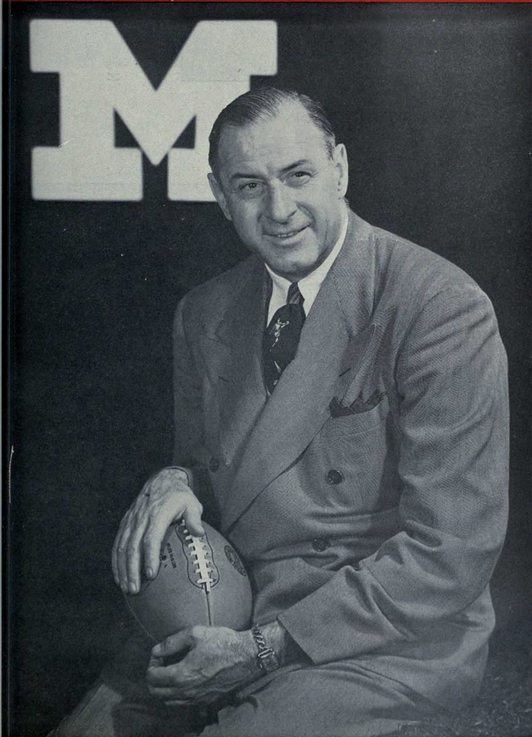
Head coach Fritz Crisler

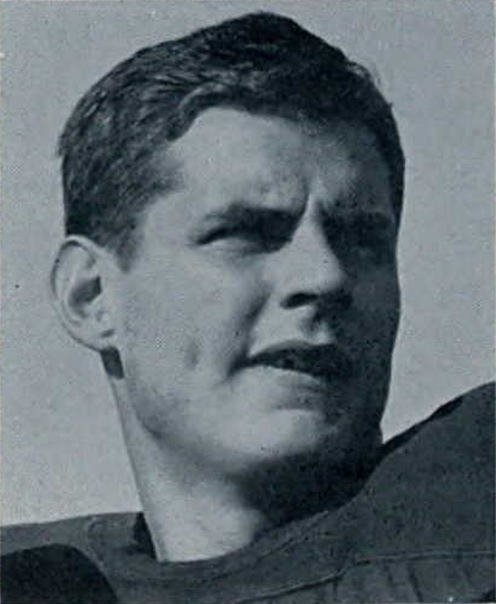
1946 Michigan MVP Bob Chappuis

In early January 1946, Biggie Munn, who had been Michigan's line coach since 1938, was hired as the head football coach at Syracuse. Jack Blott took over Munn's role as line coach. Earl Martineau, who had been Michigan's backfield coach since 1938, also left the program in early 1946 with Bennie Oosterbaan taking over responsibility for coaching the backfield.

In April and May 1946, Michigan conducted a six-week spring football practice. It was Michigan's "first peacetime practice session since 1941." More than 140 players, the largest group ever to report for a Michigan football practice to that time, showed up for spring practice.

Although World War II ended in August 1945, three of the starters from the 1945 squad were inducted into the military in early 1946. They were: Wally Teninga, who started seven games at left halfback and was the team's leading scorer in 1945; Donovan Hershberger, who started eight games at end in 1945; and Gene Hinton, who started all 10 games at right tackle in 1945. Bob Ballau, a tackle from New York, was awarded the Chicago Alumni Club trophy as the team'smost improved player during spring practice.

However, as some left for military service, others returned to Michigan after completing their military service. The returnees included:

- Bob Chappuis, who had played for Michigan in 1942, returned to the team in 1946 after three years of military service and being shot down in Italy in 1945.
- Gene Derricotte, who had started nine games at halfback in 1944, returned as a starting halfback.
- Bruce Hilkene, who had started nine games at end in 1944 and been elected captain of the 1945 team before being inducted into the military, returned for the 1946 season, though he was switched to the tackle position.
- Quentin Sickels, who had started 10 games at guard in 1944, returned from military service.
- Paul White, who had been captain of the 1943 Michigan team before joining the Marine Corps, notified coach Crisler in April 1946 that he would be returning in time for the 1946 season.
- Bob Wiese, who had played at fullback and led Michigan in scoring in 1944, returned to the fullback position in 1946 after being inducted into the military in November 1945.

The 1946 pre-season was also marked by the loss of Fielding H. Yost, head football coach at Michigan from 1901 to 1926 and athletic director from 1921 to 1940. Yost sustained a stroke on May 14, 1946, and died at his home in Ann Arbor on August 20, 1946. He was buried at Forest Hill Cemetery near the campus, with pallbearers including Bennie Oosterbaan, Robert J. Brown, and Paul G. Goebel.

After one week of fall practice in late August 1946, coach Crisler opined "we're not quite as good as we're cracked up to be." A week later, Crisler hedged on his team's prospects, stating that the 1946 squad might be he greatest, but then adding that, on the other hand, "we may lose all of our games." On September 6, 1946, Joe Ponsetto, who had been Michigan's starting quarterback in 1944 and 1945, voted by his teammates as captain of the 1946 team, and undergone knee surgery in the off-season, announced that he would not play in 1946 due to a recurrence of the injury to his knee.

The 1946 team featured three sets of brothers: Pete and Elliott from Bloomington, Illinois; guards Charles and Walter Freihofer from Indianapolis; and center J. T. White and halfback Paul White from River Rouge, Michigan.

=== Week 1: Indiana ===
Week 1: Indiana at Michigan

Team	1	2	3	4	Total
Indiana	0	0	0	0	0
• Michigan	7	0	0	14	21

- Date: September 28, 1946
- Location: Michigan Stadium
  Ann Arbor, MI
- Game attendance: 74,600
- Referee: Rollie Barnum (Wisconsin)

After losing to the Indiana Hoosiers in both 1944 and 1945, Michigan opened its 1946 season on September 28, 1946, with a 21 to 0 victory over the Hoosiers. The game was played at Michigan Stadium on a warm, sunshiny day and attracted 74,600 spectators, the largest crowd to that time for a Michigan season opener and the largest crowd ever to watch an Indiana football game.

Michigan opened the scoring with a 54-yard drive in the first quarter, capped by a 13-yard touchdown pass from Gene Derricotte to Paul White. In the fourth quarter, the Wolverines scored twice, on an 18-yard touchdown pass from Pete Elliott to Len Ford, and later on Derricotte's 51-yard sprint down the sideline. Jim Brieske kicked all three points after touchdown for Michigan. Displaying tremendous depth, 45 Michigan players saw action in the Indiana game. The Wolverines gained 190 rushing yards and 52 passing yards on four complete passes. Defensively, Michigan held Indiana to only 51 rushing yards. However, the Wolverines also gave up six interceptions on ten forward passes attempted and allowed Indiana to rack up 172 passing yards, leading head coach Fritz Crisler to describe his team's play as "ragged and sloppy."

Michigan's starting lineup against Indiana was Len Ford (left end), Bruce Hilkene (left tackle), Dominic Tomasi (left guard), Harold Watts (center), George Kraeger (right guard), Bill Pritula (right tackle), Art Renner (right end), Howard Yerges (quarterback), Henry Fonde (left halfback), Ralph Chubb (right halfback), and Jack Weisenburger (fullback).

=== Week 2: Iowa ===
Week 2: Iowa at Michigan

Team	1	2	3	4	Total
Iowa	0	0	7	0	7
• Michigan	7	7	0	0	14

- Date: October 5, 1946
- Location: Michigan Stadium
  Ann Arbor, MI
- Game attendance: 54,200
- Referee: Lloyd Larson (Wisconsin)

On October 5, 1946, Michigan defeated Iowa by a 14 to 7 score at Michigan Stadium. The Wolverines scored both of their touchdowns in the first half to take a 14 to 0 lead. Bob Chappuis scored both Michigan touchdowns on runs of eight and 12 yards, while rushing for 123 yards on 20 carries in the game. Jim Brieske kicking both points after touchdown. The first half lead could have been significantly greater, but one drive was stopped by a fumble at Iowa's four-yard line, and another ended with an intercepted pass at the Iowa four-yard line. In the second half, Michigan was held scoreless and managed only two first downs. Iowa mounted a 65-yard touchdown drive in the third quarter, and another drive in the fourth quarter was stopped at Michigan's 14-yard line when the Wolverines' defense regained the ball on downs. In all, Michigan gained 224 rushing yards and 43 passing yards. Iowa gained 148 rushing yards and 12 passing yards.

Michigan's starting lineup against Iowa was Len Ford (left end), Robert Derleth (left tackle), Dominic Tomasi (left guard), J. T. White (center), Quentin Sickels (right guard), Jack Carpenter (right tackle), Art Renner (right end), Bob Wiese (quarterback), Dan Dworsky (left halfback), Paul White (right halfback), and Jack Weisenburger (fullback).

=== Week 3: Army ===
Week 3: Army at Michigan

Team	1	2	3	4	Total
• Army	7	6	0	7	20
Michigan	7	0	6	0	13

- Date: October 12, 1946
- Location: Michigan Stadium
  Ann Arbor, MI
- Game attendance: 87,993
- Referee: Lloyd Larson (Wisconsin)

On October 12, 1946, Michigan, ranked #4 in the AP Poll, played an Army team that was ranked #2 at Michigan Stadium. Army, favored to win the game by 12 points after winning 21 straight games dating back to the 1943 season, won by seven points with a score of 20 to 13.

Michigan took a 7 to 0 lead in the first quarter on a 13-yard touchdown pass from Bob Chappuis to Howard Yerges with the point after touchdown being converted by Jim Brieske. Glenn Davis, the 1946 Heisman Trophy winner, played all 60 minutes for Army and was so dominant that the Chicago Tribune wrote that he may have earned All-American honors in one game. Davis tied the game on a 58-yard run in the first quarter. He then passed 31 yards to Bob Folson for Army's second touchdown in the second quarter. On the opening kickoff in the third quarter, Michigan drove 83 yards, and Paul White scored on a reverse from Bob Wiese. Michigan had a chance to take the lead, but Brieske's kick for the extra point was partially blocked and fell short. At the end of the third quarter, the game was tied 13 to 13. With a short touchdown run by Doc Blanchard in the fourth quarter, Army regained the lead. With less than a minute remaining, Michigan drove to Army's 10-yard line, but the game ended as Army intercepted a Michigan pass. The ground game was relatively even (152 rushing yards for Army to 141 for Michigan), but Army dominated in the air (211 passing yards to 95 for Michigan).

Michigan's starting lineup against Army was Len Ford (left end), Robert Derleth (left tackle), Dominic Tomasi (left guard), J. T. White (center), George Kraeger (right guard), Bill Pritula (right tackle), Elmer Madar (right end), Yerges (quarterback), Chappuis (left halfback), Paul White (right halfback), and Wiese (fullback).

=== Week 4: Northwestern ===
Week 4: Northwestern at Michigan

Team	1	2	3	4	Total
Northwestern	0	14	0	0	14
Michigan	7	0	0	7	14

- Date: October 19, 1946
- Location: Michigan Stadium
  Ann Arbor, MI
- Game attendance: 74,500
- Referee: Mike Layden (Notre Dame)

On October 19, 1946, Michigan, ranked #5 in the AP Poll, played a Northwestern team that was ranked #10. The two teams played to a 14–14 tie at Michigan Stadium. Bump Elliott scored both of Michigan's touchdowns, and Jim Brieske kicked both of the points after touchdown. Late in the game, Michigan blocked a Northwestern attempt at field goal and then drove to the Northwestern three-yard line, but the ball was then intercepted in the end zone drive. Northwestern out-gained Michigan on the ground (202 rushing yards for Northwestern and 80 for Michigan) with Michigan out-gaining the Wildcats in the air (149 passing yards to 110).

Michigan's starting lineup against Northwestern was Ed McNeill (left end), Bruce Hilkene (left tackle), Dominic Tomasi (left guard), J. T. White (center), George Kraeger (right guard), Bill Pritula (right tackle), Elmer Madar (right end), Howard Yerges (quarterback), Gene Derricotte (left halfback), Paul White (right halfback), and Bob Wiese (fullback).

=== Week 5: Illinois ===
Week 5: Illinois at Michigan

Team	1	2	3	4	Total
• Illinois	0	7	6	0	13
Michigan	0	7	0	2	9

- Date: October 26, 1946
- Location: Michigan Stadium
  Ann Arbor, MI
- Game attendance: 86,938
- Referee: Rollie Barnum (Wisconsin)

On October 26, 1946, at Michigan's first homecoming game since 1942, Michigan lost to Illinois by a score of 13 to 9. In the second quarter, Bob Wiese ran for the game's first touchdown, and Jim Brieske kicked the point after touchdown. On the kickoff following Michigan's touchdown, Illinois drove 95 yards and scored on a 16-yard run by Paul Patterson. In the third quarter, Illinois end Sam Zatkoff intercepted a pass thrown by Bob Chappuis and ran 53 yards for a touchdown. Illinois' attempt at extra point was blocked by Quentin Sickels. In the fourth quarter, Michigan twice drove deep into Illinois territory (once to the 17-yard line and then to the eight-yard line), but Michigan's only points in the quarter were scored a safety as Bruce Hilkene blocked a punt into the end zone. Michigan out-gained Illinois in rushing yardage, 190 yards to 112, and in passing yardage, 142 yards to 39. However, Michigan fumbled the ball 12 times in the game. The game was Michigan's last defeat until October 8, 1949, a span of nearly three years during which the Wolverines won 25 consecutive games.

Michigan's starting lineup against Illinois was Len Ford (left end), Robert Derleth (left tackle), Dominic Tomasi (left guard), J. T. White (center), Sickels (right guard), Jack Carpenter (right tackle), Elmer Madar (right end), Jack Weisenburger (quarterback), Chappuis (left halfback), Bump Elliott (right halfback), and Wiese (fullback).

=== Week 6: at Minnesota ===
Week 6: Michigan at Minnesota

Team	1	2	3	4	Total
• Michigan	0	7	7	7	21
Minnesota	0	0	0	0	0

- Date: November 2, 1946
- Location: Memorial Stadium, Minneapolis, MN
- Game attendance: 58,575
- Referee: William Blake (Loras)

On November 2, 1946, Michigan defeated Minnesota by a score of 21 to 0. In the second quarter, Michigan relied on the passing game in its first touchdown drive, as Bob Chappuis completed a pass for 43 yards to Elmer Madar and Bump Elliott then ran two yards for the touchdown on a fourth-down play. Elliott scored again in the third quarter on a 10-yard run. In the fourth quarter, Gene Derricotte threw a pass to Bob Mann that was good for 42 yards and a touchdown. Jim Brieske kicked all three points after touchdown. Michigan gained 183 rushing yards and 174 passing yards, while holding Minnesota to 130 rushing yards and 40 passing yards. The game marked the beginning of a 25-game winning streak for the Wolverines lasting until October 1949.

Michigan's starting lineup against Minnesota was Len Ford (left end), Robert Derleth (left tackle), Dominic Tomasi (left guard), J. T. White (center), Quentin Sickels (right guard), Jack Carpenter (right tackle), Elmer Madar (right end), Jack Weisenburger (quarterback), Gene Derricotte (left halfback), Ralph Chubb (right halfback), and Dan Dworsky (fullback).

=== Week 7: Michigan State ===
Week 7: Michigan State at Michigan

Team	1	2	3	4	Total
Michigan State	0	0	7	0	7
• Michigan	14	14	13	14	55

- Date: November 9, 1946
- Location: Michigan Stadium
  Ann Arbor, MI
- Game attendance: 77,134
- Referee: Lyle Clarno (Bradley)

On November 9, 1946, Michigan defeated Michigan State by a score of 55 to 7. With attendance at 77,134, the game drew the largest crowd to that date in the history of the Michigan–Michigan State football rivalry.

Michigan scored twice in each quarter with touchdowns by eight players: Bob Chappuis (run in first quarter), Pete Elliott (pass from Chappuis in first quarter), Gene Derricotte (three-yard run in second quarter), Elmer Madar (four-yard interception return), Paul White (pass from Derricotte in third quarter), Don Robinson (run in third quarter), Jack Weisenburger (three-yard run in fourth quarter), and Tony Momsen (24-yard interception return in fourth quarter). Jim Brieske kicked six points after touchdown. Len Ford scored another after Brieske's kick was blocked in the first quarter; Don Robinson recovered the loose ball and tossed to Ford who fell across the goal line. Another extra point attempt was blocked, this one by Lynn Chandnois, in the third quarter. Michigan State's touchdown came on a pass from Horace Smith to Frank Waters covering 77 yards in the third quarter. Michigan gained 500 yards in the game, 293 on the ground and 207 in the air. Michigan was held to 212 yards of which only 47 yards were gained by rushing.

Michigan's starting lineup against Michigan State was Bob Mann (left end), Bruce Hilkene (left tackle), Dominic Tomasi (left guard), J. T. White (center), Quentin Sickels (right guard), Bill Pritula (right tackle), Madar (right end), Pete Elliott (quarterback), Chappuis (left halfback), Bump Elliott (right halfback), and Weisenburger (fullback).

=== Week 8: Wisconsin ===
Week 8: Wisconsin at Michigan

Team	1	2	3	4	Total
Wisconsin	0	0	7	0	7
• Michigan	14	0	0	14	28

- Date: November 16, 1946
- Location: Michigan Stadium
  Ann Arbor, MI

On November 16, 1946, Michigan defeated Wisconsin by a score of 28 to 6. Michigan scored four touchdowns: 13-yard pass from Pete Elliott to Bob Mann in the first quarter; 27-yard pass from Bob Chappuis to Mann in the first quarter; three-yard run by Dan Dworsky in fourth quarter; and one-yard "end-around maneuver" by Len Ford in the fourth quarter. Center Jim Brieske kicked all four points after touchdown. Michigan gained 305 rushing yards and 146 passing yards. The Badgers were held to 99 rushing yards and 47 passing yards.

Michigan's starting lineup against Wisconsin was Ed McNeill (left end), Robert Derleth (left tackle), Dominic Tomasi (left guard), Brieske (center), F. Stuart Wilkins (right guard), Jack Carpenter (right tackle), Elmer Madar (right end), Howard Yerges (quarterback), Chappuis (left halfback), Bump Elliott (right halfback), and Bob Wiese (fullback).

=== Week 9: at Ohio State ===
Week 9: Michigan at Ohio State

Team	1	2	3	4	Total
• Michigan	7	20	14	17	58
Ohio State	0	0	0	6	6

- Date: November 23, 1946
- Location: Ohio Stadium, Columbus, OH
- Game attendance: 78,634
- Referee: Rollie Barnum (Wisconsin)

On November 23, 1946, Michigan defeated Ohio State by a score of 58 to 6. The 52-point spread was Ohio State's worst margin of defeat since joining the Big Ten Conference in 1913. The game was viewed by 78,634 spectators, the fourth largest crowd in Ohio Stadium history to that point.

Michigan's touchdowns were scored by Henry Fonde (2), Bob Mann (2), Bob Chappuis, Paul White, Dick Rifenburg, and Bill Culligan. Jim Brieske kicked seven points after touchdown and a field goal. Bob Chappuis passed for gains totaling 244 yards. In all, the Wolverines gained 509 yards, 300 passing and 209 rushing. A writer covering the game for the Chicago Tribune opined "few teams ever have been so impotent as Ohio State was this afternoon." In the last minute of the game, with Michigan's fourth-string backs in the game, Ohio State avoided the shutout with a touchdown pass from Bill Doolittle to Rodney Swinehart covering 77 yards.

Michigan's starting lineup against Ohio State was Ed McNeill (left end), Bruce Hilkene (left tackle), Dominic Tomasi (left guard), J. T. White (center), George Kraeger (right guard), Bill Pritula (right tackle), Elmer Madar (right end), Howard Yerges (quarterback), Gene Derricotte (left halfback), Bump Elliott (right halfback), and Jack Weisenburger (fullback).

=== Scoring summary ===
Player	Touchdowns	Extra points	Field goals	Points
Jim Brieske	0	29	1	32
Bob Mann	5	0	0	30
Bob Chappuis	4	0	0	24
Bump Elliott	4	0	0	24
Paul White	4	0	0	24
Len Ford	2	1	0	13
Gene Derricotte	2	0	0	12
Henry Fonde	2	0	0	12
Bill Culligan	1	0	0	6
Dan Dworsky	1	0	0	6
Pete Elliott	1	0	0	6
Elmer Madar	1	0	0	6
Tony Momsen	1	0	0	6
Dick Rifenburg	1	0	0	6
Don Robinson	1	0	0	6
Jack Weisenburger	1	0	0	6
Bob Wiese	1	0	0	6
Howard Yerges	1	0	0	6
Totals	33	30	1	233

=== Post-season ===
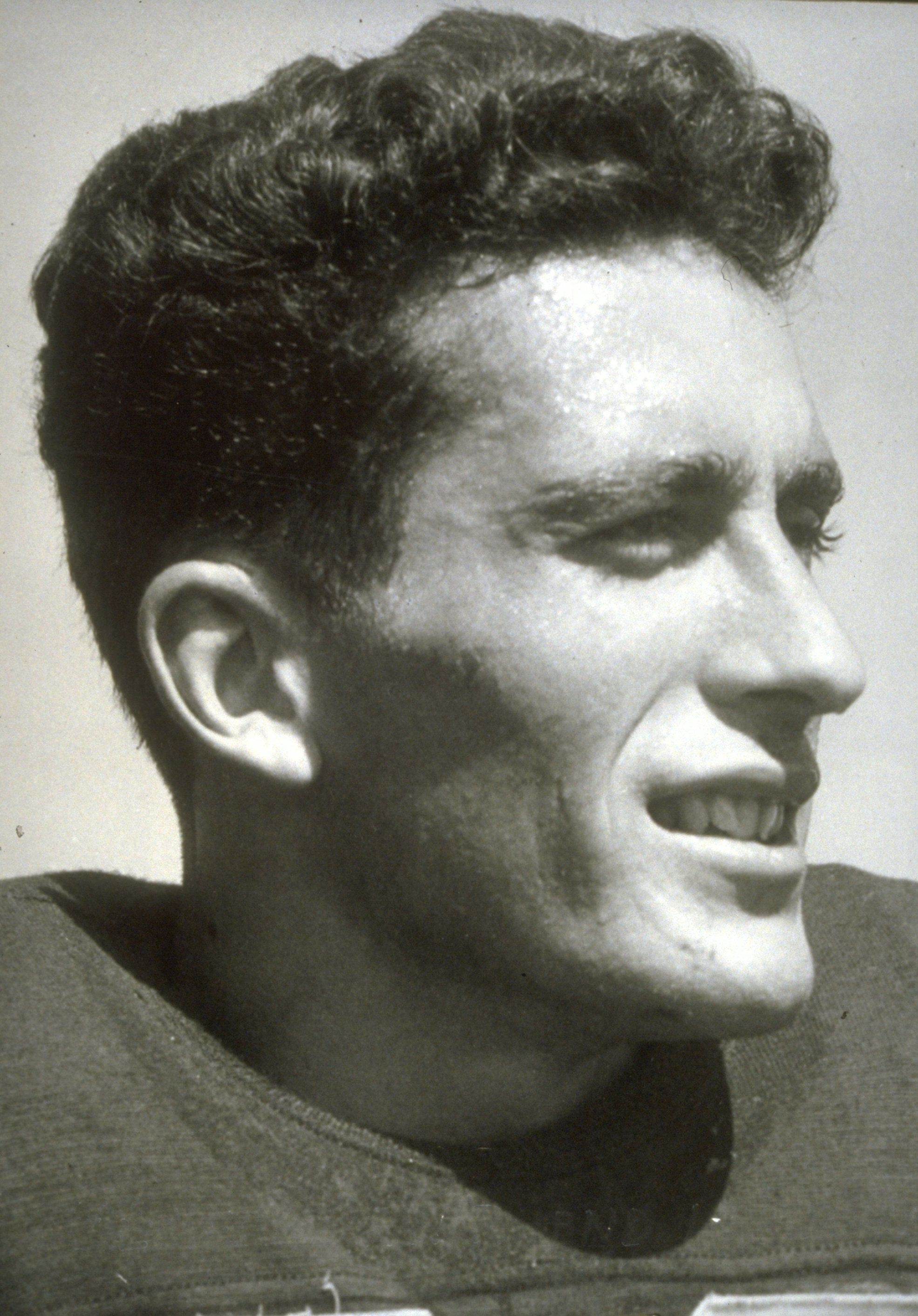
1946 All-American Elmer Madar

The Associated Press released its final poll in early December 1946. The two teams that defeated the Michigan Wolverines finished among the top five. Undefeated Army was ranked No. 2 with 48 voters picking them as the No. 1 team, narrowly missing its third consecutive national championship with 1,659-1/2 points. Big Nine Conference champion Illinois was ranked No. 5. The Wolverines were ranked #6.

The Wolverines finished the season ranked fifth in total offense with 3,122 yards gained in nine games, an average of 366.9 yards per game. They also ranked fifth in passing offense with 1,322 passing yards, an average of 146.9 yards per game.

In the selection of All-America teams at the end of the 1946 season, three Michigan players received recognition:

- End Elmer Madar was selected by the Associated Press (AP) as a first-team All-American, by the International News Service (INS) as a second-team All-American, and by the Central Press Association (CP) as a third-team All-American.
- Halfback Bob Chappuis was selected by the INS as a second-team All-American and by the CP as a third-team All-American.
- End Len Ford was selected by the Newspaper Enterprise Association (NEA) as a third-team All-American.

Both the AP and United Press (UP) selected 1946 All-Big Nine Conference football teams. Elmer Madar and Bob Chappuis were consensus first-team picks by both the AP and UP Tackle Jack Carpenter received first-team honors from the UP, and guard Dominic Tomasi received second-team honors from the UP.

Bob Chappuis was also selected as the Most Valuable Player on the 1946 Michigan team, and finished second behind Illinois guard Alex Agase in voting for the Chicago Tribune Silver Football as the Most Valuable Player in the Big Nine Conference.

== Players ==
=== Varsity letter winners ===
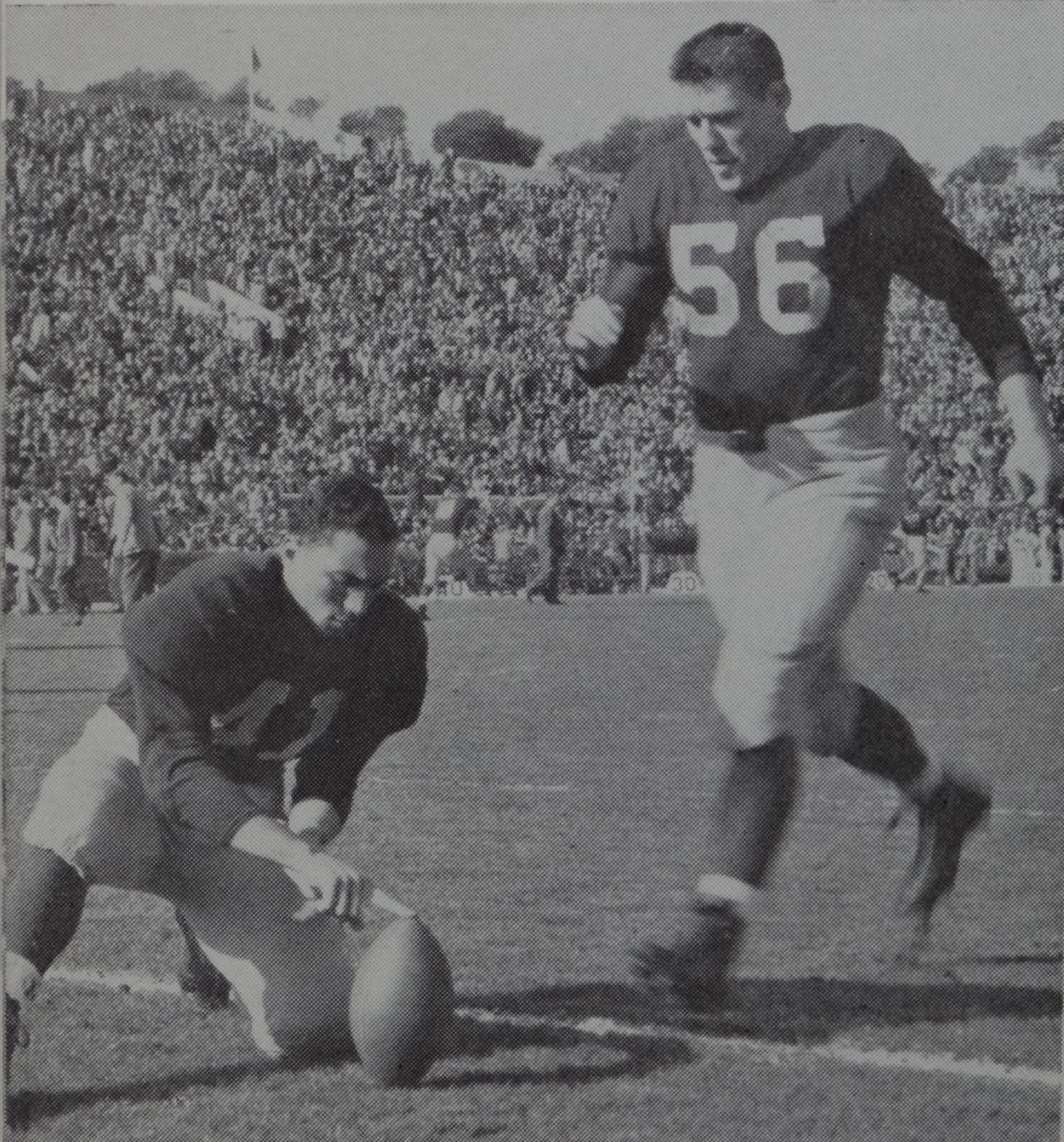
Jim Brieske, the leading scorer on the 1946 team with 32 points.

The following players received varsity letters for their participation on the 1946 Michigan football team. Players who started at least half of the games are shown in bold.

- Edward H. Bahlow, Springfield, Illinois - end
- Robert M. Ballou, Chester, Vermont - tackle
- Jim Brieske, Harbor Beach, Michigan - placekicker, and 1 game as starter at center
- George Burg, Winnetka, Illinois - guard
- Bob Callahan, St. Louis, Missouri - center
- Jack Carpenter, Kansas City, Missouri - started 4 games at right tackle
- Bob Chappuis, Toledo, Ohio - started 4 games at left halfback
- Ralph L. Chubb, Ann Arbor, Michigan - started 2 games at right halfback
- Fenwick J. Crane, Pleasant Ridge, Michigan - tackle
- William L. Culligan, Detroit - halfback
- Robert Derleth, Marquette, Michigan - started 3 games at left tackle
- **Gene Derricotte**, Defiance, Ohio - started 5 games at left halfback
- Dan Dworsky, Sioux Falls, South Dakota - started 1 game at fullback
- Bump Elliott, Bloomington, Illinois - started 3 games at right halfback
- Pete Elliott, Bloomington, Illinois - started 1 game at quarterback
- Henry Fonde, Knoxville, Tennessee - halfback
- Len Ford, Washington, D.C. - started 4 games at left end
- Donovan P. Hershberger, Freeport, Illinois - end
- **Bruce Hilkene**, Indianapolis, Indiana - started 6 games at left tackle
- **George Kraeger**, Indianapolis, Indiana - started 5 games at right guard
- John F. Lintol, Detroit - guard
- **Elmer Madar**, Detroit - started 7 games at right end
- Bob Mann, New Bern, North Carolina - started 2 games at left end
- Edward D. McNeill, Toledo, Ohio - started 3 games at left end
- Tony Momsen, Toledo, Ohio -
- **Bill Pritula**, Detroit - started 5 games at right tackle
- Art Renner, Sturgis, Michigan - started 2 games at right end
- Dick Rifenburg, Saginaw, Michigan - end
- Don Robinson, Detroit - quarterback
- **Quentin Sickels**, Benton Harbor, Michigan - started 3 games at right guard
- Joe Soboleski, Grand Rapids, Michigan - guard
- **Dominic Tomasi**, Flint, Michigan - started 9 games at left guard
- Robert W. Vernier, Toledo, Ohio - quarterback
- Harold Watts, Birmingham, Michigan - started 2 games at center
- **Jack Weisenburger**, Muskegon Heights, Michigan - started 3 games at quarterback, 2 games at fullback, 1 game at right halfback
- **J. T. White**, River Rouge, Michigan - started 6 games at center
- Paul White, River Rouge, Michigan - started 3 games at right halfback
- **Bob Wiese**, Jamestown, North Dakota - started 6 games at fullback
- **F. Stuart Wilkins**, Canton, Ohio - started 1 game at right guard
- **Howard Yerges**, Point Pleasant, West Virginia - started 5 games at quarterback

=== Reserves ===
The following players had "reserve" status on the 1946 Michigan football team.

- Bruce Beatty, Canton, Ohio - halfback
- Richard Brown, Detroit - tackle
- Louis Brunsting Jr., Rochester, Minnesota - quarterback
- John Eizonas, Detroit - tackle
- Robert Erben, Akron, Ohio - center
- Alan Fitch, Kensington, Michigan - guard
- Walter Freihofer, Indianapolis, Indiana - guard
- John Ghindia, Ecorse, Michigan - quarterback
- Lloyd Heneveld, Holland, Michigan - guard
- James Holgate, Milwaukee, Wisconsin - halfback
- Charles Huebler, Plymouth, Michigan - tackle
- Norman Jackson, Canton, Ohio - fullback
- Kurt Kampe Jr., Detroit - guard
- Walter Keeler, Bay City, Michigan - center
- Frank Kiser, Lakewood, Ohio - guard
- Donald Kuick, Midland, Michigan - halfback
- Donald Labenda, Detroit - tackle
- Charles Lentz, Toledo, Ohio - halfback
- John Maturo, Hamden, Connecticut - guard
- James Morrish, Pleasant Ridge, Michigan - halfback
- Alton Noble, Detroit - halfback
- Elmer Phillips, Big Bend, West Virginia - guard
- Harold Raymond, Flint, Michigan - end
- Richard Strauss, Lansing, Michigan - tackle
- Alan Traugott, Indianapolis - halfback
- Irv Wisniewski, Lambertville, Michigan - center
- John Witherspoon, Detroit - guard
- Michael Yedniak, Flint, Michigan - fullback

=== Awards and honors ===
- 1946 All-Americans: Elmer Madar (AP-1, INS-2), Bob Chappuis (INS-2)
- All-Conference: Elmer Madar (AP-1, UP-1), Bob Chappuis (AP-1, UP-1), Jack Carpenter (UP-1), Dominic Tomasi (UP-2)
- Most Valuable Player: Bob Chappuis
- Meyer Morton Award: Bob Ballou

=== NFL and AAFC drafts ===
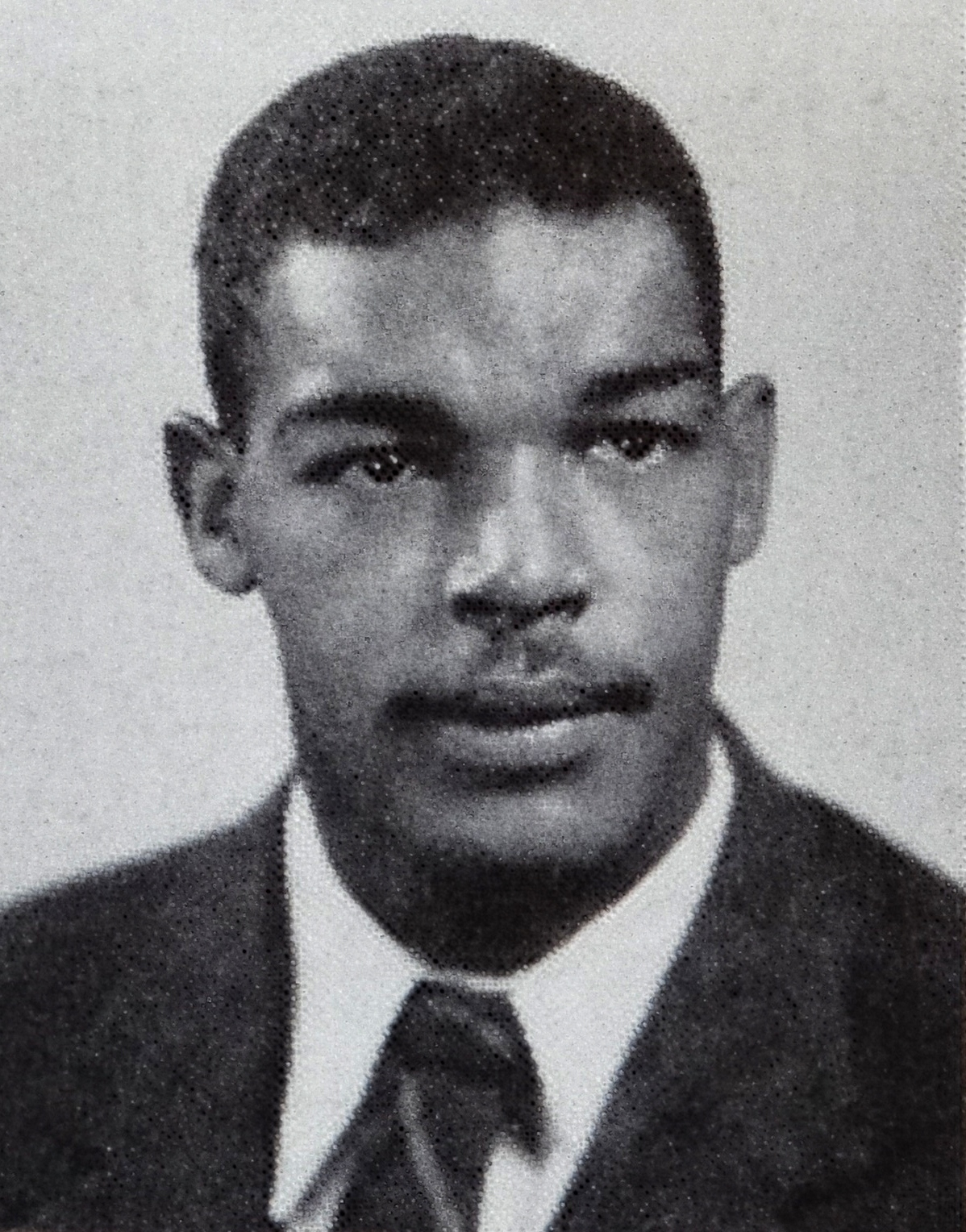
Len Ford was later inducted into the Pro Football Hall of Fame.

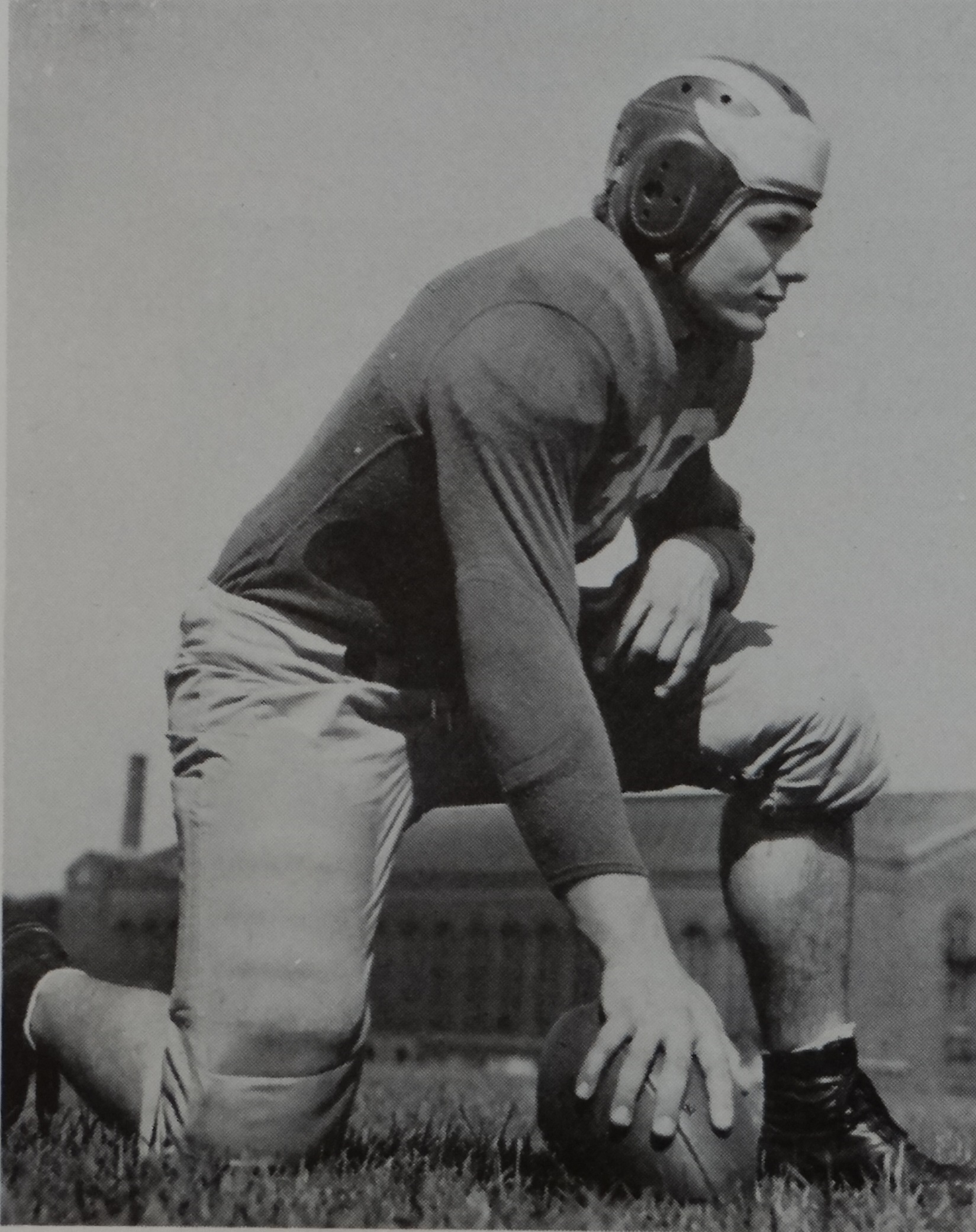
Dan Dworsky played in the AAFC with the Los Angeles Dons.

The following 23 players from the 1946 Michigan football team were drafted to play and/or actually played in the National Football League (NFL) and/or the All-America Football Conference (AAFC):

- Jim Brieske: Brieske was selected by the Baltimore Colts with the 81st pick in the 1947 AAFC Draft, and by the New York Giants with the 97th pick in the 1948 NFL draft.
- Bob Callahan: Callahan was selected by the Chicago Cardinals with the 289th pick in the 1947 NFL draft. He played for the Buffalo Bills in 1948.
- Jack Carpenter: Carpenter was selected by the Cleveland Browns with the 24th pick in the 1947 AAFC Draft, and by the Chicago Cardinals with the 143rd pick in the 1944 NFL draft. He played for the Buffalo Bills and San Francisco 49ers from 1947 to 1949.
- Bob Chappuis: Chappuis was selected by the Cleveland Browns with the eight pick in the 1947 AAFC Draft, and by Detroit Lions with the 26th pick in the 1947 NFL draft. He played for the Brooklyn Dodgers and Chicago Hornets in 1948 and 1949.
- Ralph Chubb: Chubb was selected by the Los Angeles Rams with the 143rd pick in the 1947 NFL draft.
- Robert Derleth: Derleth was selected by the Chicago Rockets with the 20th pick in the 1947 AAFC Draft, and by the Detroit Lions with the 29th pick in the 1944 NFL draft. He played for the Lions in 1947.
- Gene Derricotte: Derricotte was selected by the Cleveland Browns with the eight pick of the AAFC's secret draft held in July 1948, but he was injured during training camp with the Browns at the end of July 1949 while standing along the sidelines playing catch with a teammate.
- Dan Dworsky: Dworsky was drafted by the Los Angeles Dons with the fifth pick in the AAFC's secret draft held in July 1948, and by the Green Bay Packers with the 15th pick in the 1949 NFL draft. He played for the Dons in 1949.
- Bump Elliott: Elliott was drafted by the Detroit Lions with the 76th pick in the 1947 NFL draft. He opted instead to pursue a career in coaching. In 1949, brothers Bump and Pete Elliott worked together as assistant coaches at Oregon State. Bump was the head coach at Michigan from 1959 to 1968.
- Pete Elliott: Elliott was drafted by the Chicago Hornets with the third pick in the AAFC's secret draft held in July 1948, and by the Detroit Lions with the 127th pick in the 1948 NFL draft. He opted instead to pursue a career in coaching starting in 1949 as an assistant coach at Oregon State and later serving as a head coach at Nebraska, California, Illinois, and Miami. He was inducted into the College Football Hall of Fame in 1994.
- Len Ford: Ford was drafted by the Los Angeles Dons with the 14th pick in the 1948 AAFC Draft. He played 11 years in the NFL from 1948 to 1958 and was inducted into the Pro Football Hall of Fame in 1976.
- Elmer Madar: Madar was selected by the Baltimore Colts with the first pick in the 1947 AAFC Draft, and by the Detroit Lions with the 176th pick in the 1947 NFL draft. He played for the Colts in 1947.
- Bob Mann: Mann played for the Detroit Lions (1948–1949) and Green Bay Packers (1950–1954). He was the first African-American player for both teams.
- Ed McNeill: McNeill was drafted by the Cleveland Browns with the 37th pick in the 1949 AAFC Draft, and by the Washington Redskins with the 88th pick in the 1949 NFL draft.
- Tony Momsen: Momsen was selected by the Los Angeles Rams with the 59th pick in the 1951 NFL draft, and played in the NFL during the 1951 and 1952 seasons.
- Bill Pritula: Pritula was selected by the San Francisco 49ers with the 118th pick in the 1948 AAFC Draft.
- Art Renner: Renner was selected by the Green Bay Packers with the 56th pick in the 1946 NFL draft.
- Dick Rifenburg: Rifenburg was selected by the New York Yankees with the 24th pick in the 1949 AAFC Draft, and by Philadelphia Eagles with the 132nd pick in the 1948 NFL draft. He played for the Detroit Lions in 1950.
- Quentin Sickels: Sickels was selected by the Detroit Lions with the 147th pick in the 1948 NFL draft.
- Joe Soboleski: Soboleski was selected by the Cleveland Browns with the 192nd pick in the 1949 AAFC Draft, and by the New York Giants with the 86th pick in the 1949 NFL draft. He played professional football in the AAFC and NFL for four years from 1949 to 1952.
- Jack Weisenburger: Weisenburger was selected by the Washington Redskins with the 38th pick in the 1948 NFL draft. He was also selected by the New York Yankees with the 64th pick in the 1948 AAFC Draft.
- J. T. White: White was selected by the Brooklyn Dodgers with the 84th pick in the 1947 AAFC Draft, and by the Detroit Lions with the 186th pick in the 1947 NFL draft.
- Bob Wiese: Wiese was selected by the San Francisco 49ers with the 14th pick in the 1947 AAFC Draft, and by the Detroit Lions with the 39th pick in the 1945 NFL draft. He played for the Lions in 1947 and 1948.

== Coaching staff ==
- Head coach: Fritz Crisler
- Assistant coaches

- Backfield coach: Bennie Oosterbaan
- Line coach: Jack Blott assisted by Forrest "Butch" Jordan
- End coach: Arthur Valpey
- "B" squad coach: Wally Weber, assisted by head wrestling coach Cliff Keen and Jack Petoskey
- Chief scout, assistant coach and assistant athletic director: Ernest McCoy, appointed to the new post in January 1946

- Trainer: Ray Roberts
- Manager: Max Kogen
