= 1946 Minnesota Golden Gophers football team =

American college football season

1946 Minnesota Golden Gophers football
- Conference: Big Nine Conference
- Record: 5–4 (3–4 Big Nine)
- Head coach: Bernie Bierman (12th season)
- MVP: Billy Bye
- Captain: Robert Sandberg
- Home stadium: Memorial Stadium

1946 Big Nine Conference football standings
	Conf.					Overall
Team	W		L		T	W		L		T
No. 5 Illinois $	6	–	1	–	0	8	–	2	–	0
No. 6 Michigan	5	–	1	–	1	6	–	2	–	1
No. 20 Indiana	4	–	2	–	0	6	–	3	–	0
Iowa	3	–	3	–	0	5	–	4	–	0
Minnesota	3	–	4	–	0	5	–	4	–	0
Ohio State	2	–	3	–	1	4	–	3	–	2
Northwestern	2	–	3	–	1	4	–	4	–	1
Wisconsin	2	–	5	–	0	4	–	5	–	0
Purdue	0	–	5	–	1	2	–	6	–	1
$ – Conference champion; Rankings from AP Poll

The 1946 Minnesota Golden Gophers football team represented the University of Minnesota in the 1946 Big Nine Conference football season. In their 12th year under head coach Bernie Bierman, the Golden Gophers compiled a 5–4 record and outscored their opponents by a combined total of 130 to 114.

Halfback Billy Bye was awarded the team MVP award.

Minnesota was ranked at No. 27 in the final Litkenhous Difference by Score System rankings for 1946.

Total attendance for the season was 328,003, which averaged to 54,667. The season high for attendance was against Michigan.

== Schedule ==
Date	Opponent	Site	Result	Attendance	Source
September 28	Nebraska*	Memorial Stadium; Minneapolis, MN (rivalry)	W 33–6	51,093	
October 5	Indiana	Memorial Stadium; Minneapolis, MN	L 0–21	53,648	
October 12	at No. 10 Northwestern	Dyche Stadium; Evanston, IL	L 7–14	40,000	
October 19	Wyoming*	Memorial Stadium; Minneapolis, MN	W 46–0	46,087	
October 26	at Ohio State	Ohio Stadium; Columbus, OH	L 9–39	76,611	
November 2	No. 13 Michigan	Memorial Stadium; Minneapolis, MN (Little Brown Jug)	L 0–21	58,575	
November 9	Purdue^{†}	Memorial Stadium; Minneapolis, MN	W 13–7	58,341	
November 16	No. 16 Iowa	Memorial Stadium; Minneapolis, MN (rivalry)	W 16–6	59,180	
November 23	at Wisconsin	Camp Randall Stadium; Madison, WI (rivalry)	W 6–0	45,000	
*Non-conference game; ^{†}Homecoming; Rankings from AP Poll released prior to the game

== Game summaries ==
=== Michigan ===
Week 6: Michigan at Minnesota

Team	1	2	3	4	Total
• Michigan	0	7	7	7	21
Minnesota	0	0	0	0	0

- Date: November 2, 1946
- Location: Memorial Stadium, Minneapolis
- Game attendance: 58,575
- Referee: William Blake (Loras)

On November 2, 1946, Minnesota lost to by a score of 21 to 0. In the second quarter, Michigan relied on the passing game in its first touchdown drive, as Bob Chappuis completed a pass for 43 yards to Elmer Madar and Bump Elliott then ran two yards for the touchdown on a fourth-down play. Elliott scored again in the third quarter on a 10-yard run. In the fourth quarter, Gene Derricotte threw a pass to Bob Mann that was good for 42 yards and a touchdown. Jim Brieske kicked all three points after touchdown. Michigan gained 183 rushing yards and 174 passing yards, while holding Minnesota to 130 rushing yards and 40 passing yards.

== After the season ==
The 1947 NFL Draft was held on December 16, 1946. The following Golden Gophers were selected.

Round	Pick	Player	Position	NFL Club
16	145	Verne Gagne	End	Chicago Bears
23	210	Tom Carroll	Tackle	Chicago Cardinals
