= 1946 Northwestern Wildcats football team =

American college football season

1946 Northwestern Wildcats football
- Conference: Big Nine Conference
- Record: 4–4–1 (2–3–1 Big Nine)
- Head coach: Pappy Waldorf (12th season)
- MVP: Ed Hirsch
- Captain: Bill Ivy
- Home stadium: Dyche Stadium

1946 Big Nine Conference football standings
	Conf.					Overall
Team	W		L		T	W		L		T
No. 5 Illinois $	6	–	1	–	0	8	–	2	–	0
No. 6 Michigan	5	–	1	–	1	6	–	2	–	1
No. 20 Indiana	4	–	2	–	0	6	–	3	–	0
Iowa	3	–	3	–	0	5	–	4	–	0
Minnesota	3	–	4	–	0	5	–	4	–	0
Ohio State	2	–	3	–	1	4	–	3	–	2
Northwestern	2	–	3	–	1	4	–	4	–	1
Wisconsin	2	–	5	–	0	4	–	5	–	0
Purdue	0	–	5	–	1	2	–	6	–	1
$ – Conference champion; Rankings from AP Poll

The 1946 Northwestern Wildcats team was an American football team that represented Northwestern University during the 1946 Big Ten Conference football season. In their 12th and final year under head coach Pappy Waldorf, the Wildcats compiled a 4–4–1 record (2–3–1 against conference opponents), finished in seventh place in the Big Nine Conference, and outscored opponents by a total of 156 to 136.

The team ranked first in the Big Nine, and ninth nationally, in rushing offense with an average of 217.6 rushing yards per game. It was ranked at No. 17 in the final Litkenhous Difference by Score System rankings.

Halfback Vic Schwall was selected by both the Associated Press and United Press as a first-team player on the 1946 All-Big Nine Conference football team. Guard Ed Hirsch was selected by the Central Press Association as a first-team player on the 1946 All-America college football team.

== Schedule ==
Date	Opponent	Rank	Site	Result	Attendance	Source
September 28	Iowa State*		Dyche Stadium; Evanston, IL	W 41–9	41,000	
October 5	Wisconsin		Dyche Stadium; Evanston, IL	W 28–0	45,000	
October 12	Minnesota	No. 10	Dyche Stadium; Evanston, IL	W 14–7	40,000	
October 19	at No. 5 Michigan	No. 10	Michigan Stadium; Ann Arbor, MI (rivalry)	T 14–14	74,500	
October 26	Pacific (CA)*	No. 8	Dyche Stadium; Evanston, IL	W 26–13	35,000	
November 2	Ohio State	No. 6	Dyche Stadium; Evanston, IL	L 27–39	46,000	
November 9	Indiana	No. 17	Dyche Stadium; Evanston, IL	L 6–7		
November 16	at No. 2 Notre Dame*		Notre Dame Stadium; Notre Dame, IN (rivalry)	L 0–27	58,000	
November 23	No. 5 Illinois		Dyche Stadium; Evanston, IL (rivalry)	L 0–20	47,000	
*Non-conference game; Rankings from AP Poll released prior to the game

== Rankings ==
Ranking movements Legend: ██ Increase in ranking ██ Decrease in ranking — = Not ranked т = Tied with team above or below
	Week								
Poll	1	2	3	4	5	6	7	8	Final
AP	10	10	8т	6	17т	—	—	—	—

== After the season ==
The 1947 NFL draft was held on December 16, 1946. The following Wildcats were selected.

Round	Pick	Player	Position	NFL club
1	10	Vic Schwall	Halfback	New York Giants
6	38	Frank Aschenbrenner	Running back	Pittsburgh Steelers
7	52	Dick Connors	Back	Green Bay Packers
8	60	George Maddock	Tackle	Chicago Cardinals
11	91	Alex Sarkisian	Center	Philadelphia Eagles
26	245	Max Morris	End	Chicago Bears
30	280	Jerry Carle	Back	Green Bay Packers
31	287	Vince DiFrancesca	Guard	Pittsburgh Steelers
