= 1946 Indiana Hoosiers football team =

American college football season

1946 Indiana Hoosiers football
- Conference: Big Nine Conference

Ranking
- AP: No. 20
- Record: 6–3 (4–2 Big Nine)
- Head coach: Bo McMillin (13th season)
- MVP: Pete Pihos
- Captain: Howie Brown
- Home stadium: Memorial Stadium

1946 Big Nine Conference football standings
	Conf.					Overall
Team	W		L		T	W		L		T
No. 5 Illinois $	6	–	1	–	0	8	–	2	–	0
No. 6 Michigan	5	–	1	–	1	6	–	2	–	1
No. 20 Indiana	4	–	2	–	0	6	–	3	–	0
Iowa	3	–	3	–	0	5	–	4	–	0
Minnesota	3	–	4	–	0	5	–	4	–	0
Ohio State	2	–	3	–	1	4	–	3	–	2
Northwestern	2	–	3	–	1	4	–	4	–	1
Wisconsin	2	–	5	–	0	4	–	5	–	0
Purdue	0	–	5	–	1	2	–	6	–	1
$ – Conference champion; Rankings from AP Poll

The 1946 Indiana Hoosiers football team was an American football team that represented the Indiana Hoosiers in the 1946 Big Nine Conference football season. In their 13th year under head coach Bo McMillin, the Hoosiers compiled a 6–3 record (4–2 against Big Nine opponents), outscored opponents by a total of 129 to 95, finished in third place in the Big Nine, and were ranked No. 20 in the final AP Poll (No. 19 in the final Litkenhous Difference by Score System rankings).

On defense, the Hoosiers led the Big Nine and ranked 14th nationally, allowing an average of only 179.9 yards per game. In passing defense, they ranked fourth nationally, giving up only 59.8 yards per game.

The Hoosiers also fielded the second best passing offense in the Big Nine, and ranked seventh nationally, with an average of 140.4 passing yards per game. The team's pass offense was led by quarterback Ben Raimondi who ranked third nationally with 956 passing yards. End Lou Mihajlovich was the team's leading receiver with 25 receptions for 300 yards.

Fullback Pete Pihos was named the team's most valuable player. Two Hoosiers received second-team honors on the 1946 All-America college football team: Raimondi (Associated Press) and center John Cannady (Central Press). Four Hoosiers also received honors from the Associated Press (AP) or United Press (UP) on the 1946 All-Big Nine Conference football team: Raimondi (AP-1, UP-1); tackle Russ Deal (AP-1, UP-1); Cannady (AP-1, UP-2); and Pihos (UP-2).

The Hoosiers played their home games at Memorial Stadium in Bloomington, Indiana.

== Schedule ==
Date	Opponent	Rank	Site	Result	Attendance	Source
September 21	Cincinnati*		Memorial Stadium; Bloomington, IN	L 6–15	15,000	
September 28	at Michigan		Michigan Stadium; Ann Arbor, MI	L 0–21	74,600	
October 5	at Minnesota		Memorial Stadium; Minneapolis, MN	W 21–0	53,648	
October 12	Illinois		Memorial Stadium; Bloomington, IN (rivalry)	W 14–7	27,000	
October 19	Iowa	No. 18	Memorial Stadium; Bloomington, IN	L 0–13	27,000	
October 26	at Nebraska*		Memorial Stadium; Lincoln, NE	W 27–7	36,200	
November 2	Pittsburgh*	No. 20	Memorial Stadium; Bloomington, IN	W 20–6	17,000	
November 9	at No. 17 Northwestern		Dyche Stadium; Evanston, IL	W 7–6		
November 23	at Purdue		Ross–Ade Stadium; West Lafayette, IN (Old Oaken Bucket)	W 34–20	43,000	
*Non-conference game; Rankings from AP Poll released prior to the game

== Rankings ==
Ranking movements Legend: ██ Increase in ranking ██ Decrease in ranking — = Not ranked ( ) = First-place votes
	Week								
Poll	1	2	3	4	5	6	7	8	Final
AP	—	18	—	20	—	—	—	—	20 (1)

== After the season ==
The 1947 NFL draft was held on December 16, 1946. The following Hoosiers were selected.

Round	Pick	Player	Position	NFL club
3	22	John Cannady	Center	New York Giants
6	41	Ben Raimondi	Back	Chicago Cardinals
17	150	Bob Ravensburg	End	Chicago Cardinals
18	160	Jim Goodman	Tackle	Green Bay Packers
19	173	Jim Dewar	Halfback	Los Angeles Rams
