= 1946 Ohio State Buckeyes football team =

American college football season

1946 Ohio State Buckeyes football
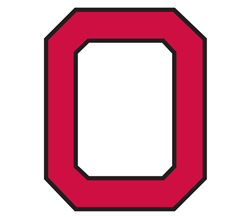
- Conference: Big Nine Conference
- Record: 4–3–2 (2–3–1 Big Nine)
- Head coach: Paul Bixler (1st season)
- MVP: Cecil Souders
- Captain: Warren Amling
- Home stadium: Ohio Stadium

1946 Big Nine Conference football standings
	Conf.					Overall
Team	W		L		T	W		L		T
No. 5 Illinois $	6	–	1	–	0	8	–	2	–	0
No. 6 Michigan	5	–	1	–	1	6	–	2	–	1
No. 20 Indiana	4	–	2	–	0	6	–	3	–	0
Iowa	3	–	3	–	0	5	–	4	–	0
Minnesota	3	–	4	–	0	5	–	4	–	0
Ohio State	2	–	3	–	1	4	–	3	–	2
Northwestern	2	–	3	–	1	4	–	4	–	1
Wisconsin	2	–	5	–	0	4	–	5	–	0
Purdue	0	–	5	–	1	2	–	6	–	1
$ – Conference champion; Rankings from AP Poll

The 1946 Ohio State Buckeyes football team was an American football team that represented Ohio State University in the 1946 Big Nine Conference football season. In Paul Bixler's only season as head coach, the Buckeyes compiled a 4–3–2 record (2–3–1 against conference opponents) and were outscored by a total of 170 to 166. The Buckeyes were ranked No. 12 in the AP Poll on November 4, 1946, but lost the final two games of their season against No. 9 Illinois and No. 8 Michigan. Right guard Warren Amling, a veterinary student, was elected as team captain.

Ohio State was ranked at No. 25 in the final Litkenhous Difference by Score System rankings for 1946.

== Schedule ==
Date	Opponent	Rank	Site	Result	Attendance	Source
September 28	Missouri*		Ohio Stadium; Columbus, OH	T 13–13	65,004	
October 5	at USC*		Los Angeles Memorial Coliseum; Los Angeles, CA	W 21–0	80,047	
October 12	at Wisconsin	No. 14	Camp Randall Stadium; Madison, WI	L 7–20	45,000	
October 19	Purdue		Ohio Stadium; Columbus, OH	T 14–14	76,025	
October 26	Minnesota		Ohio Stadium; Columbus, OH	W 39–9	76,611	
November 2	at No. 6 Northwestern		Dyche Stadium; Evanston, IL	W 39–27	46,000	
November 9	Pittsburgh*	No. 12	Ohio Stadium; Columbus, OH	W 20–13	74,743	
November 16	at No. 9 Illinois	No. 13	Memorial Stadium; Champaign, IL (Illibuck)	L 7–16	61,519	
November 23	No. 8 Michigan^{†}		Ohio Stadium; Columbus, OH (rivalry)	L 6–58	78,634	
*Non-conference game; ^{†}Homecoming; Rankings from AP Poll released prior to the game

== Rankings ==
Ranking movements Legend: ██ Increase in ranking ██ Decrease in ranking — = Not ranked
	Week								
Poll	1	2	3	4	5	6	7	8	Final
AP	14	—	—	—	12	13	—	—	—

== Awards and honors ==
Tackle Warren Amling was a consensus first-team pick on the 1946 All-America college football team. Three Ohio State players received honors from the Associated Press (AP) or United Press (UP) on the 1946 All-Big Nine Conference football team: end Cecil Souders (AP-1, UP-1); Amling (AP-1, UP-2); and fullback Joe Whisler (UP-1). Souders was also selected by his teammates as the team's most valuable player.

== Statistics ==
On offense, the Buckeyes averaged 94.2 passing yards and 199.4 rushing yards. On defense, they allowed an average of 106.6 passing yards and 176.9 rushing yards. The team's statistical leaders included quarterback George Spencer with 398 passing yards, fullback Joseph Whisler with 544 rushing yards, and Bob Brugge with 193 receiving yards.

== Personnel ==
=== Players ===
- Warren Amling, tackle
- Dave Bonnie
- Bob Brugge
- Michael Cannavino
- Jameson Crane
- Traian Dendiu
- William Doolittle
- Charles Gandee
- Tommy James
- Carlton Kessler
- Jerry Krall
- Richard Palmer
- Ernest Parks
- Pete Perini
- Thomas Phillips
- Richard Slager
- Cecil Souders, end
- George Spencer, quarterback
- Rodney Swinehart
- Alex Verdova
- Joe Whisler, fullback
- Russell Wolfe

=== Coaching staff ===
- Paul Bixler, head coach, first year
- Sam T. Selby, assistant

== NFL draft ==
The 1947 NFL Draft was held on December 16, 1946. The following Buckeyes were selected.

Round	Pick	Player	Position	NFL Club
2	12	Russ Thomas	Tackle	Detroit Lions
12	103	Dante Lavelli	End	Los Angeles Rams
12	105	Tony Adamle	Linebacker	Chicago Bears
17	146	Tommy James	Defensive back	Detroit Lions
30	283	Hal Dean	Guard	Los Angeles Rams
