= 1946 Illinois Fighting Illini football team =

American college football season

1946 Illinois Fighting Illini football

Big Nine champion Rose Bowl champion

Rose Bowl, W 45–14 vs. UCLA
- Conference: Big Nine Conference

Ranking
- AP: No. 5
- Record: 8–2 (6–1 Big Nine)
- Head coach: Ray Eliot (5th season)
- MVP: Alex Agase
- Captain: Mac Wenskunas
- Home stadium: Memorial Stadium

1946 Big Nine Conference football standings
	Conf.					Overall
Team	W		L		T	W		L		T
No. 5 Illinois $	6	–	1	–	0	8	–	2	–	0
No. 6 Michigan	5	–	1	–	1	6	–	2	–	1
No. 20 Indiana	4	–	2	–	0	6	–	3	–	0
Iowa	3	–	3	–	0	5	–	4	–	0
Minnesota	3	–	4	–	0	5	–	4	–	0
Ohio State	2	–	3	–	1	4	–	3	–	2
Northwestern	2	–	3	–	1	4	–	4	–	1
Wisconsin	2	–	5	–	0	4	–	5	–	0
Purdue	0	–	5	–	1	2	–	6	–	1
$ – Conference champion; Rankings from AP Poll

The 1946 Illinois Fighting Illini football team was an American football team that represented the University of Illinois as a member of the Big Nine Conference during the 1946 Big Nine season. In their fifth year under head coach Ray Eliot, the Fighting Illini compiled an 8–2 record (6–1 in conference games), won the Big Nine championship, and outscored opponents by a total of 217 to 105. They were ranked No. 5 in the final AP poll and concluded the season with a 45–14 victory over No. 4 UCLA in the 1947 Rose Bowl.

Guard Alex Agase was a consensus first-team selection on the 1946 All-America college football team. Agase also received the Chicago Tribune Silver Football as the Big Nine's most valuable player. Four Illinois players received honors from the Associated Press (AP) or United Press (UP) on the 1946 All-Big Nine Conference football team: Agase (AP-1, UP-1); ends Ike Owens (UP-1) and Sam Zatkoff (UP-2); and halfback Jules Rykovich (UP-2). Center Mac Wenskunas was the team captain.

The team played its home games at Memorial Stadium in Champaign, Illinois.

== Schedule ==
Date	Time	Opponent	Rank	Site	Result	Attendance	Source
September 21	1:00 p.m.	at Pittsburgh*		Pitt Stadium; Pittsburgh, PA	W 33–7	35,000	
September 28		Notre Dame*		Memorial Stadium; Champaign, IL	L 6–26	75,119	
October 5		Purdue		Memorial Stadium; Champaign, IL (rivalry)	W 43–7	38,519	
October 12		at Indiana	No. 12	Memorial Stadium; Bloomington, IN (rivalry)	L 7–14	27,000	
October 19	2:00 p.m.	No. 20 Wisconsin^{†}		Memorial Stadium; Champaign, IL	W 27–21	62,597	
October 26		at No. 8 Michigan		Michigan Stadium; Ann Arbor, MI (rivalry)	W 13–9	86,938	
November 2		at Iowa	No. 11	Iowa Stadium; Iowa City, IA	W 7–0	52,000	
November 16		No. 13 Ohio State	No. 9	Memorial Stadium; Champaign, IL (Illibuck)	W 16–7	61,519	
November 23		at Northwestern	No. 5	Dyche Stadium; Evanston, IL	W 20–0	47,000	
January 1		vs. No. 4 UCLA*	No. 5	Rose Bowl; Pasadena, CA (Rose Bowl)	W 45–14	93,083	
*Non-conference game; ^{†}Homecoming; Rankings from AP Poll released prior to the game; All times are in Eastern time

== Game summaries ==
=== vs Pittsburgh ===
Illinois Fighting Illini at Pittsburgh Panthers (0–0) – Game summary

Quarter	1	2	3	4	Total
Fighting Illini	7	0	13	13	33
Panthers	0	7	0	0	7

at Pitt Stadium • Pittsburgh, PA

- Date: September 21
- Game attendance: 35,00

Illinois opened its season with a 33–7 victory over Pittsburgh at Pitt Stadium, in front of approximately 35,000 spectators. The game was much closer than the final score indicated, particularly in the first half.

Pitt, playing its first game under new head coach Wesley Fesler, jumped back from an early Illinois touchdown to tie the game 7–7 at halftime. Illinois halfback Claude “The Illinois Express” Young opened the scoring with a spectacular 46-yard touchdown run, but freshman Louis Cecconi of Donora, Pennsylvania, answered with a one-yard touchdown plunge for Pitt. The Panthers actually outgained Illinois during much of the first half, despite facing a larger and more experienced team.

The Panthers' energetic first-half effort appeared to wear them down, however. Early in the third quarter, Illinois substitute back Art Dufelmeier broke through for a 38-yard touchdown run. Illinois then recovered a Pitt fumble at the Panthers' 20-yard line, and Young scored again shortly afterward. In the fourth quarter, Illinois added two more touchdowns: Tom Steward connected with Paul Patterson on a 27-yard touchdown pass, followed by Chuck Maggioli's 75-yard punt return.

Despite the lopsided final score, the statistics showed a relatively competitive game. Illinois held only a 10–9 advantage in first downs and outgained Pitt 226–205 in total offense. Pitt's passing game was more productive, completing 6 of 19 passes for 73 yards, while Illinois completed just 2 of 9 for 33 yards. Young was largely contained by Pitt's defense aside from his two touchdown runs.

Statistics	ILL	Pitt
First downs	10	9
Plays–yards		
Rushes–yards	193	132
Passing yards	33	73
Passing: comp–att–int	2-9-2	6-19-4
Time of possession		

== Rankings ==
Ranking movements Legend: ██ Increase in ranking ██ Decrease in ranking — = Not ranked
	Week								
Poll	1	2	3	4	5	6	7	8	Final
AP	12	—	—	11	10	9	5	5	5

== Roster ==
Player	Position
Alex Agase	Offensive guard
Perry Moss	Quarterback
Ruck Steger
Les Bingaman	Guard, Tackle
Sam Zatkoff	End
Joe Buscemi
Bob Cunz	Tackle
Don Maechtle	Placekicker
Don Pittman
Chuck Gottfried
Al Martignago
Lyle Button	Tackle
Lou Levanti	Center
Bob Prymuski	Guard
Tom Gallagher
Al Mastrangeli	Center
Merle Schlosser	End
Bernie Krueger	Quarterback
Dike Eddleman	Punter
Bill Franks	Tackle
Chick Maggioli	Defensive back, Halfback
Paul Patterson	Quarterback
Ike Owens	End, Defensive end
Art Dufelmeier (Captain)	Halfback
Tom Stewart
Bob Hinkle
Lou Agase	Tight end, Tackle
Jim Valck
Jack Pierce
Burt Schmidt
Denny Bassett
Walt Kersulis	End
John Wrenn	Guard
Herb Siegert	Guard, Linebacker
Bill Heiss	End

- Head coach: Ray Eliot (5th year at Illinois)
- Line coach: Burt Ingwersen

== Awards and honors ==
- Alex Agase
  - Chicago Tribune Silver Football
  - Consensus All-American (guard)
