= 1946 Iowa Hawkeyes football team =

American college football season

1946 Iowa Hawkeyes football
- Conference: Big Nine Conference
- Record: 5–4 (3–3 Big Nine)
- Head coach: Eddie Anderson (5th season)
- MVP: Bill Kay
- Home stadium: Iowa Stadium

1946 Big Nine Conference football standings
	Conf.					Overall
Team	W		L		T	W		L		T
No. 5 Illinois $	6	–	1	–	0	8	–	2	–	0
No. 6 Michigan	5	–	1	–	1	6	–	2	–	1
No. 20 Indiana	4	–	2	–	0	6	–	3	–	0
Iowa	3	–	3	–	0	5	–	4	–	0
Minnesota	3	–	4	–	0	5	–	4	–	0
Ohio State	2	–	3	–	1	4	–	3	–	2
Northwestern	2	–	3	–	1	4	–	4	–	1
Wisconsin	2	–	5	–	0	4	–	5	–	0
Purdue	0	–	5	–	1	2	–	6	–	1
$ – Conference champion; Rankings from AP Poll

The 1946 Iowa Hawkeyes football team was an American football team that represented the University of Iowa as a member of the Big Ten Conference during the 1946 Big Nine football season. In their fifth season under head coach Eddie Anderson, the Hawkeyes compiled a 5–4 record (3–3 in conference games), finished in fourth place in the Big Nine, and outscored opponents by a total of 129 to 92. The team allowed an average of 200.7 yards per game, the best total defense in Iowa history. Iowa was ranked No. 19 in the final Litkenhous Ratings released in December 1946.

Anderson returned as a head coach after completing his military service; he was inducted into the College Football Hall of Fame in 1971.

The team's statistical leaders included Bob Smith with 503 rushing yards, Emlen Tunnell with 228 passing yards, Dick Hoerner with 72 receiving yards, and Bob Sullivan with 25 points scored. Tackle Bill Kay was selected as the team's most valuable player. Guard Earl Banks and fullback Dick Hoerner were selected as first-team players on the 1946 All-Big Nine Conference football team.

The team played its home games at Iowa Stadium in Iowa City, Iowa. It drew 197,811 spectators at five home games, an average of 39,562 per game.

== Schedule ==
Date	Opponent	Rank	Site	Result	Attendance	Source
September 21	North Dakota Agricultural*		Iowa Stadium; Iowa City, IA	W 39–0		
September 28	Purdue		Iowa Stadium; Iowa City, IA	W 16–0	36,000	
October 5	at Michigan		Michigan Stadium; Ann Arbor, MI	L 7–14	52,400	
October 12	Nebraska*		Iowa Stadium; Iowa City, IA (rivalry)	W 21–7	30,500	
October 19	at No. 18 Indiana		Memorial Stadium; Bloomington, IN	W 13–0	27,000	
October 26	No. 2 Notre Dame*	No. 17	Iowa Stadium; Iowa City, IA	L 6–41	52,311	
November 2	No. 11 Illinois^{†}		Iowa Stadium; Iowa City, IA	L 0–7	52,000	
November 9	at No. 15 Wisconsin		Camp Randall Stadium; Madison, WI (rivalry)	W 21–7	45,000	
November 16	at Minnesota	No. 16	Memorial Stadium; Minneapolis, MN (rivalry)	L 6–16	59,180	
*Non-conference game; ^{†}Homecoming; Rankings from AP Poll released prior to the game

== Rankings ==
Ranking movements Legend: ██ Increase in ranking ██ Decrease in ranking — = Not ranked
	Week								
Poll	1	2	3	4	5	6	7	8	Final
AP	—	—	17	—	—	16	—	—	—

== After the season ==
The 1947 NFL draft was held on December 16, 1946. The following Hawkeyes were selected.

Round	Pick	Player	Position	NFL club
13	107	Bob Sullivan	Halfback	Boston Yanks
23	214	Hal Shoener	End	New York Giants
24	219	Bob Smith	Defensive back	Washington Redskins
31	286	Herb Shoener	End	Washington Redskins
