= 1946 Purdue Boilermakers football team =

American college football season

1946 Purdue Boilermakers football
- Conference: Big Nine Conference
- Record: 2–6–1 (0–5–1 Big Nine)
- Head coach: Cecil Isbell (3rd season)
- MVP: Ned Maloney
- Captain: Dick Barwegen
- Home stadium: Ross–Ade Stadium

1946 Big Nine Conference football standings
| | Conf. | | | | | Overall |
| Team | W | | L | | T | W | | L | | T |
|---|---|---|---|---|---|---|---|---|---|---|
| No. 5 Illinois $ | 6 | – | 1 | – | 0 | 8 | – | 2 | – | 0 |
| No. 6 Michigan | 5 | – | 1 | – | 1 | 6 | – | 2 | – | 1 |
| No. 20 Indiana | 4 | – | 2 | – | 0 | 6 | – | 3 | – | 0 |
| Iowa | 3 | – | 3 | – | 0 | 5 | – | 4 | – | 0 |
| Minnesota | 3 | – | 4 | – | 0 | 5 | – | 4 | – | 0 |
| Ohio State | 2 | – | 3 | – | 1 | 4 | – | 3 | – | 2 |
| Northwestern | 2 | – | 3 | – | 1 | 4 | – | 4 | – | 1 |
| Wisconsin | 2 | – | 5 | – | 0 | 4 | – | 5 | – | 0 |
| Purdue | 0 | – | 5 | – | 1 | 2 | – | 6 | – | 1 |
$ – Conference champion; Rankings from AP Poll

The 1946 Purdue Boilermakers football team was an American football team that represented Purdue University during the 1946 Big Ten Conference football season. In their third season under head coach Cecil Isbell, the Boilermakers compiled a 2–6–1 record, finished in last place in the Big Ten Conference with an 0–5–1 record against conference opponents, and were outscored by their opponents by a total of 208 to 97.

Notable players from the 1946 Purdue team included quarterback Bob DeMoss, guard Dick Barwegen, and back Bulbs Ehlers. DeMoss ranked ninth nationally with 59 pass completions, good for 814 yards.

Purdue was ranked at No. 48 in the final Litkenhous Difference by Score System rankings for 1946.

== Schedule ==
| Date | Opponent | Site | Result | Attendance | Source |
|---|---|---|---|---|---|
| September 21 | Miami (OH)* | Ross–Ade Stadium; West Lafayette, IN | W 13–7 | 23,000 | |
| September 28 | at Iowa | Iowa Stadium; Iowa City, IA | L 0–16 | 36,000 | |
| October 5 | at Illinois | Memorial Stadium; Champaign, IL (rivalry) | L 7–43 | 38,519 | |
| October 12 | at No. 3 Notre Dame* | Notre Dame Stadium; Notre Dame, IN (rivalry) | L 6–49 | 55,452 | |
| October 19 | at Ohio State | Ohio Stadium; Columbus, OH | T 14–14 | 76,025 | |
| October 26 | at Pittsburgh* | Pitt Stadium; Pittsburgh, PA | W 10–8 | 38,000 | |
| November 2 | No. 18 Wisconsin^{†} | Ross–Ade Stadium; West Lafayette, IN | L 20–24 | 32,000 | |
| November 9 | at Minnesota | Memorial Stadium; Minneapolis, MN | L 7–13 | 58,341 | |
| November 23 | Indiana | Ross–Ade Stadium; West Lafayette, IN (Old Oaken Bucket) | L 20–34 | 43,000 | |
*Non-conference game; ^{†}Homecoming; Rankings from AP Poll released prior to the game

== Roster ==
- Dick Barwegen, G
- Ed Cody, FB
- Bob DeMoss, QB
- Bulbs Ehlers, HB
- Barry French, T
- John Galvin, HB
- Ken Gorgal, QB
- Thomas Hard, G
- Bob Heck, E
- Bob Johnson, C
- Morris Kaastad, G
- Lou Karras, T
- Joe Kodba, C
- Ned Maloney, E
- Frank Mattingley, FB
- John McKay, HB
- George Mihal, FB
- Jack Milito, FB
- Bill Murray, G
- Sam Nevills, T
- Phil O'Reilly, T
- Bob Pfohl, HB
- Kenneth Smock, HB
- Raymond Stoelting, T
- Hank Stram, FB-HB
- Harry Szulborski, HB
- Gordon Tanner, E
- Jim Walley, QB
- Ralph Weiger, E

== After the season ==
The 1947 NFL draft was held on December 16, 1946. The following Boilermakers were selected.

| Round | Pick | Player | Position | NFL club |
|---|---|---|---|---|
| 31 | 293 | Bulbs Ehlers | Back | Chicago Bears |
| 32 | 295 | Bo Pievo | Tackle | Washington Redskins |
