= 1946 Wisconsin Badgers football team =

American college football season

1946 Wisconsin Badgers football
- Conference: Big Nine Conference
- Record: 4–5 (2–5 Big Nine)
- Head coach: Harry Stuhldreher (11th season)
- MVP: Fred Negus
- Captain: Clarence Esser
- Home stadium: Camp Randall Stadium

1946 Big Nine Conference football standings
	Conf.					Overall
Team	W		L		T	W		L		T
No. 5 Illinois $	6	–	1	–	0	8	–	2	–	0
No. 6 Michigan	5	–	1	–	1	6	–	2	–	1
No. 20 Indiana	4	–	2	–	0	6	–	3	–	0
Iowa	3	–	3	–	0	5	–	4	–	0
Minnesota	3	–	4	–	0	5	–	4	–	0
Ohio State	2	–	3	–	1	4	–	3	–	2
Northwestern	2	–	3	–	1	4	–	4	–	1
Wisconsin	2	–	5	–	0	4	–	5	–	0
Purdue	0	–	5	–	1	2	–	6	–	1
$ – Conference champion; Rankings from AP Poll

The 1946 Wisconsin Badgers football team was an American football team that represented the University of Wisconsin in the 1946 Big Nine Conference football season. The team compiled a 4–5 record (2–5 against conference opponents) and finished in eighth place in the Big Nine Conference. Harry Stuhldreher was in his 11th year as Wisconsin's head coach. The team averaged 253.1 yards per game of total offense, 179.8 by rushing, and 73.3 by passing.

The team's statistical leaders included Earl Maves with 538 rushing yards, Lisle Blackbourn, Jr., with 175 passing yards, Tom Bennett with 124 receiving yards, and Ben Bendrick with 30 points scored. Center Fred Negus received the team's most valuable player award. T. A. Cox led the Big Nine with an average of 43.0 yards per punt. Clarence Esser was the team captain.

Earl Maves rushed for 155 yards against Marquette on September 21, 1946. In the same game, he set a Wisconsin school record with an 86-yard touchdown run. That record stood until 1957. Also in the Marquette game, Gene Evans set a school record with three interceptions, a record that stood until 1954. The defense held Marquette to five rushing yards in the game.

On September 28, 1946, Wisconsin set a school record by holding California to 71 yards (24 rushing, 47 passing). That record stood until 2005.

Wisconsin was ranked at No. 29 in the final Litkenhous Difference by Score System rankings for 1946.

The team played its home games at Camp Randall Stadium. During the 1946 season, the average attendance at home games was 45,000.

== Schedule ==
Date	Opponent	Rank	Site	Result	Attendance	Source
September 21	Marquette*		Camp Randall Stadium; Madison, WI	W 34–0	45,000	
September 28	at California*		Memorial Stadium; Berkeley, CA	W 28–7	50,000	
October 5	at Northwestern		Dyche Stadium; Evanston, IL	L 0–28	45,000	
October 12	No. 14 Ohio State		Camp Randall Stadium; Madison, WI	W 20–7	45,000	
October 19	at Illinois	No. 20	Memorial Stadium; Champaign, IL	L 21–27	62,597	
November 2	at Purdue	No. 18	Ross–Ade Stadium; West Lafayette, IN	W 24–20	32,000	
November 9	Iowa^{†}	No. 15	Camp Randall Stadium; Madison, WI (rivalry)	L 7–21	45,000	
November 16	at No. 10 Michigan		Michigan Stadium; Ann Arbor, MI	L 6–28	63,415	
November 23	Minnesota		Camp Randall Stadium; Madison, WI (rivalry)	L 0–6	45,000	
*Non-conference game; ^{†}Homecoming; Rankings from Coaches' Poll released prior to the game

== Rankings ==
Ranking movements Legend: ██ Increase in ranking ██ Decrease in ranking — = Not ranked т = Tied with team above or below
	Week								
Poll	1	2	3	4	5	6	7	8	Final
AP	—	20т	—	18	15	—	—	—	—

== After the season ==
The 1947 NFL draft was held on December 16, 1946. The following Badgers were selected.

Round	Pick	Player	Position	NFL club
1	11	Don Kindt	Defensive back	Chicago Bears
15	133	George Fuchs	Back	Los Angeles Rams
20	180	Clarence Esser	End	Chicago Cardinals
26	236	Earl Maves	Wingback	Detroit Lions
