= Robert Derleth =

American football player (1922–2012)

No. 73
- Position: Tackle

Personal information
- Born: June 9, 1922; Marquette, Michigan, U.S.
- Died: December 16, 2012 (aged 90); Lansing, Michigan, U.S.
- Listed height: 6 ft 3 in (1.91 m)
- Listed weight: 230 lb (104 kg)

Career information
- College: Michigan
- NFL draft: 1944: 29th round, 299th overall pick

Career history
- Detroit Lions (1947)

Career NFL statistics
- Games played: 1
- Stats at Pro Football Reference

Robert J. Derleth (June 9, 1922 – December 16, 2012) was an American professional football lineman. He played college football for the University of Michigan Wolverines football teams in 1942, 1943, 1945 and 1946 — missing the 1944 season due to military service. He also played professional football for the Detroit Lions in 1947.

== Biography ==
Derleth was born in Marquette, Michigan in 1922. After graduating from Bishop Baraga High School in 1941, Derleth enrolled at the University of Michigan. He joined the Michigan Wolverines football team coached by Fritz Crisler in 1942. He started several games for the Wolverines at the tackle position in 1943. Derleth was also the captain of the Michigan Wolverines men's ice hockey team in 1943.

After the 1943 season, Derleth was inducted into the U.S. Navy and assigned to aviation training cadet at the Iowa Pre-Flight School in Iowa City, Iowa. He also played football on the Navy's Iowa Seahawks team. The 1944 Iowa Seahawks included star players such as Les Horvath, and defeated the Iowa Hawkeyes in 1944 by a score of 30 to 6. Derleth also took up track while in the Navy as reflected in a June 1945 wire report: "Bob Derleth and Bobby Mickelson took up track for the first time this season. Proof that Derleth, a former Michigan football tackle, catches on quickly is illustrated by his 133 feet 7-inch cast of the discus which brought him the all-time Seahawk mark in the event."

While Derleth was serving in the Navy, the Detroit Lions selected him as the 299th overall pick in the 29th round of the 1944 NFL draft. Upon being placed on inactive status by the Navy in October 1945, Derleth elected to return to the University of Michigan rather than play professional football. The Associated Press reported that Derleth's return to the team had "sparked" the Wolverines. The article continued:

"Derleth reported for practice yesterday after being placed on inactive dutv by the Navy. The Marquette, Mich., lineman immediately was issued a uniform and put in considerable time at the right guard spot during scrimmage. The former aviation cadet said he was in 'pretty good' physical shape and was an inch taller and about 14 pounds heavier than the last time he played for Michigan. In 1942 he was six-two and weighed 203."

In mid-October 1945, Derleth returned to Michigan after being placed on inactive duty by the Navy. He saw action in the November 1945 "Homecoming" game against Minnesota. During the 1946 season, Derleth returned to the starting lineup at the tackle position. Derleth suffered a concussion in the 1946 game against Illinois and did not play the following week.

After his 1946 season at Michigan, Derleth was drafted in by the Chicago Rockets in the 1947 AAFC Draft as the 25th overall pick. In May 1947, Derleth signed instead with the Detroit Lions, who still held the NFL rights to his services. At the time Derleth signed with the Lions, he weighed 230 pounds. The 1947 Detroit Lions team included six former Michigan football players, including Derleth's Wolverine teammates Bob Westfall, Merv Pregulman, Bob Wiese, and Elmer Madar. Derleth appeared in only one game for the Lions in 1947. He was later recognized by the Pro Football Hall of Fame on the honor roll of more than 1,000 NFL personnel to serve in the military during World War II.

Derleth later became the president of Motor Wheel Corporation, a position he held from 1967 to 1979. He died in December 2012 at a hospice in Lansing, Michigan, at age 90.
