= Jim Brieske =

American football player (1923–1968)

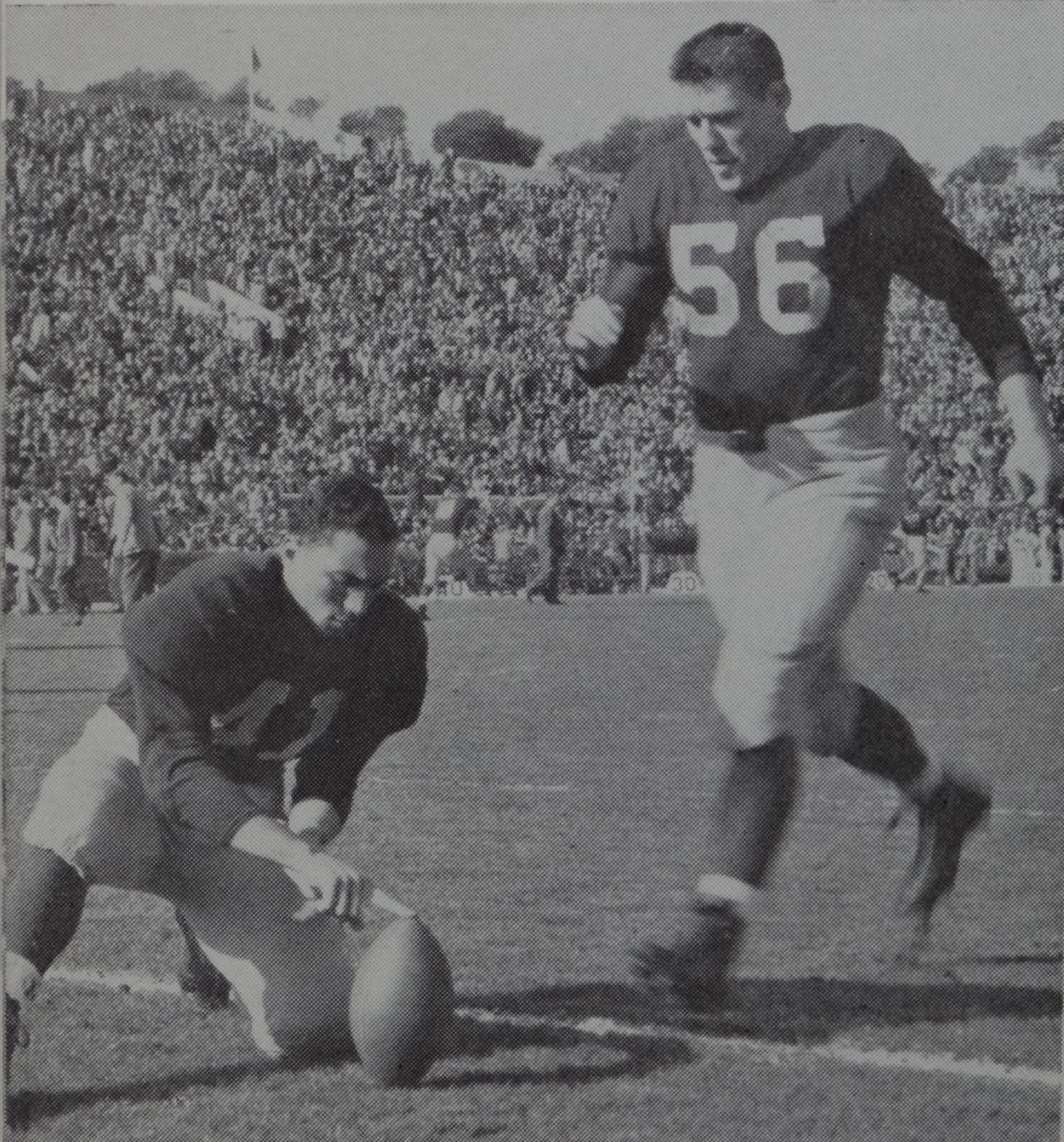
- Brieske from 1948 Michiganensian

No. 56
- Positions: Placekicker, Center

Personal information
- Born: May 4, 1923; Saginaw or Port Huron, Michigan, U.S.
- Died: November 29, 1968 (aged 45); Ann Arbor, Michigan, U.S.

Career information
- College: Michigan
- NFL draft: 1948: 12th round, 97th overall pick

Career history
- 1942, 1946–1947: Michigan Wolverines

James F. Brieske (May 4, 1923 – November 29, 1968) was an American football placekicker. He played college football for the University of Michigan in 1942, 1946 and 1947. He set Michigan, Rose Bowl, Big Ten Conference, and national collegiate placekicking records and was the second leading scorer on Michigan's undefeated 1947 Michigan Wolverines football team. For more than two decades, he held the Michigan records for most successful point after touchdown ("PAT") conversions in a career (107), season (52), and game (9). Brieske's college football career was interrupted by service in the United States Navy during the 1944 and 1945 football seasons. His kicking foot was amputated in 1967 due to cancer. He died the following year at age 45 following surgery to remove growths from his lungs.

== Early life ==
Brieske was born in May 1923 in either Saginaw, or Port Huron, Michigan. His family moved to Harbor Beach in the Thumb of Michigan in the late 1920s. His father, Frank Brieske, was a Michigan native of German descent who, at the time of the 1930 United States census, was working as an oil agent at Harbor Beach. His mother, Sadie Brieske, was a Michigan native of Polish descent. Brieske had an older sister Lorraine (born c. 1921), a younger sister Helen (born c. 1927), and a younger brother Kenneth (born c. 1929). Brieske was a backfield star for the Harbor Beach High School football team and graduated from the school in 1941.

== University of Michigan ==
Brieske enrolled at the University of Michigan in 1941. He played on the all-freshman football team that year. He played three years of varsity football for the Michigan Wolverines football team under head coach Fritz Crisler. Brieske graduated in 1947 with a B.S. in science and mathematics. After graduating in 1947, Brieske enrolled as a graduate student in Michigan's Business Administration School.

=== 1942 season ===
As a sophomore, Brieske played for the 1942 Michigan Wolverines football team that was ranked No.8 in the final AP Poll. He tried out for the center position, but that position was filled by All-American (and future College Football Hall of Fame inductee) Merv Pregulman. Brieske won a spot on the team as a placekicker. He converted 26 of 31 point after touchdown ("PAT") attempts in 1942.

Brieske's talent as a kicker won him acclaim, and in November 1942, stories about Brieske were published in newspapers across the country. Michigan had lost or tied several close games in Fritz Crisler's first four years at Michigan as a result of missed PAT attempts (including 7–6 losses to Minnesota in 1938 and 1940 and a 20–20 tie with Ohio State in 1941). One newspaper story noted that Brieske had earned the nickname "Old Monotony" because his reliability in converting PATs had turned Michigan's kicking game from excitement to routine. At the time, Brieske told the reporter he wasn't satisfied with having a limited role as a placekicker: "Sure, this kicking is alright, but I'd like to take a crack at the real stuff." He was also known by the nicknames "automatic Jim," and the "mechanical toe."

Teammate Bob Chappuis later recounted a story from the 1942 season when he and Brieske were both sophomores. In the first game of the 1942 season, Brieske kicked a field goal to secure a 9–0 victory over the Great Lakes Naval Station team. The next week, Brieske brought his hometown newspaper into the locker room. The headline read, "Jim Brieske, the Pride of Harbor Beach." Brieske showed it to his teammates and then took it into the coaches' locker room and showed it to them. Chappuis recalled that was "a bad mistake!" Head coach Fritz Crisler had Brieske play linebacker during practice that day, where he was "on his back all day." Eventually, Crisler walked over to Brieske who was lying on his back and said, "Brieske, you're not the pride of Harbor Beach, you're a jackass."

=== Military service ===
An injury kept Brieske from playing during the 1943 season, and he also missed the 1944 and 1945 seasons while serving in the United States Navy.

=== 1946 season ===
Brieske returned to the University of Michigan in time for summer football training in August 1946. He played for the 1946 Michigan Wolverines football team that finished the season ranked No.6 in the final Associated Press poll. Brieske completed 29 of 32 PATs in 1946 and also kicked a field goal. With 32 points, he was the Wolverines' leading scorer in 1946.

=== 1947 season ===
Brieske graduated with his B.S. degree in 1947, and the Baltimore Colts offered him a contract to play professional football. Instead, he returned to Michigan in the fall of 1947 as a graduate student in the Business Administration School. He was the place-kicker for the 1947 Michigan Wolverines football team that finished undefeated and untied with a 10–0 record. In an October 1947 article on the growth of specialization in football, The Sporting News wrote:

"Brieske is one of the greatest kickers college football has ever had. He led the Wolverines in scoring, entirely with his foot, last season and in three games, this fall, converted on 23 of 25 attempts.

Brieske converted 52 of 57 PAT attempts and was the team's second leading scorer during the 1947 regular season. Only two of the five PATs Brieske failed to convert in 1947 were "misses" resulting from his own inaccuracy. Three of the misses resulted from balls that were fumbled or snapped poorly from the center.

Brieske had converted 31 of 34 PAT attempts in the first five games of the 1947 season and was the leading scorer in the Big Ten Conference at the end of October. He converted 7 of 7 attempts against both Northwestern and Stanford and 9 of 10 against Pitt. The fact that an extra point specialist led the conference in scoring drew national media attention. Sports writer Bob French wrote a column about Brieske titled, "Specialist Comes Into His Own." He called Brieske "one of the specialists who make this football era picturesque" and noted the irony that Brieske was the conference's leading scorer even though he had not been involved in an official play: "Brieske makes his points without using up any time at all. The watch is stopped when he goes into action after touchdowns. You might say he doesn't play; he just scores." The Los Angeles Times also noted the unusual nature of Brieske's contributions:

"Brieske has an enviable distinction. He has scored his 100 points in NO TIME AT ALL. No sir. It didn't take him one single minute to score all those points. Football rules call for the clock to be stopped on the try for extra point. That means Brieske, a third-string center, has booted all those tallies without ever officially being in a single football game."

Brieske explained the secret to his success: "You've got to believe you're going to kick that point and let nothing disturb your poise once you're set. I 'wish' it over every time."

Although ranked second in the Associated Press poll at the end of the regular season, the Wolverines defeated the USC Trojans by a score of 49–0 in the 1948 Rose Bowl game, and were selected as the nation's number-one team by a 226–119 margin over Notre Dame in an unprecedented post-bowl Associated Press poll. The 1947 team has been selected as the best team in the history of Michigan football.

After the 1947 season, Brieske was selected to play in the College All-Star Game against the NFL champion Chicago Cardinals. He was one of 10 players from the 1947 Michigan team invited to play in the game.

=== Placekicking records ===
- With 52 successful PAT conversions in 1947, Brieseke surpassed the national collegiate record of 47 conversions in a season set by Dick Walterhouse of Army and George Jernigan of Georgia. The official records dated back to 1937 when the National Collegiate Athletic Bureau began compiling statistics. Michigan's Tom Hammond kicked 65 extra points for the 1903 "Point-a-Minute" team.
- His total of 107 successful PAT conversions in three years set the Michigan career record. His career record was broken in 1974 by Mike Lantry who converted 113 PATs.
- He set Michigan's season record for successful PAT conversions by completing 52 of 57 attempts in 1947. His season record was broken in 1971 by Dana Coin who converted 55 PATs.
- He set Michigan's single-game record for successful PAT conversions by converting 9 of 10 attempts against Pitt on October 11, 1947. His single-game record was broken on November 7, 1981, by Ali Haji-Sheikh with 10 PATs. (James E. Lawrence kicked 19 successful PAT conversions against Michigan Agricultural in 1902, but the National Collegiate Athletic Bureau began compiling "official" statistics until 1937.)
- He set the record for successful PAT conversions in conference play by converting 22 of 23 attempts in 1946. He tied his own record by converting 22 of 24 attempts in conference play in 1947.
- He set a Rose Bowl record with seven PATs in the 1948 Rose Bowl.
- He tied the Rose Bowl record set in 1931 with three PAT in one quarter during the 1948 Rose Bowl.

== Later years and family ==
In January 1948, Brieske was selected by the New York Giants in the 12th round as the 97th overall pick in the 1948 NFL draft. In April 1948, Giants President John V. Mara announced that the club had signed Brieske. Brieske played in several pre-season games for the Giants, but opted to return to Ann Arbor in September 1948 to complete his master's degree.

Brieske and his wife Ann had two children, James Brieske Jr., and Karen Brieske.

During the 1960s, Brieske was the director of student activities at Stevenson High School in Livonia, Michigan.

In January 1967, Brieske was sick with cancer and had his right leg amputated from approximately eight inches below the knee. When the cancer returned, Brieske was hospitalized again in late October 1968. In late November 1968, he underwent surgery at the University of Michigan Hospital to remove lung growths. He suffered a stroke after the operation and remained in a coma until he died the following day. His funeral was held at St. Aidan's Roman Catholic Church in Livonia, and he was buried at Holy Sepulchre Cemetery in Southfield, Michigan.
