= J. T. White =

American football player and coach (1920–2005)

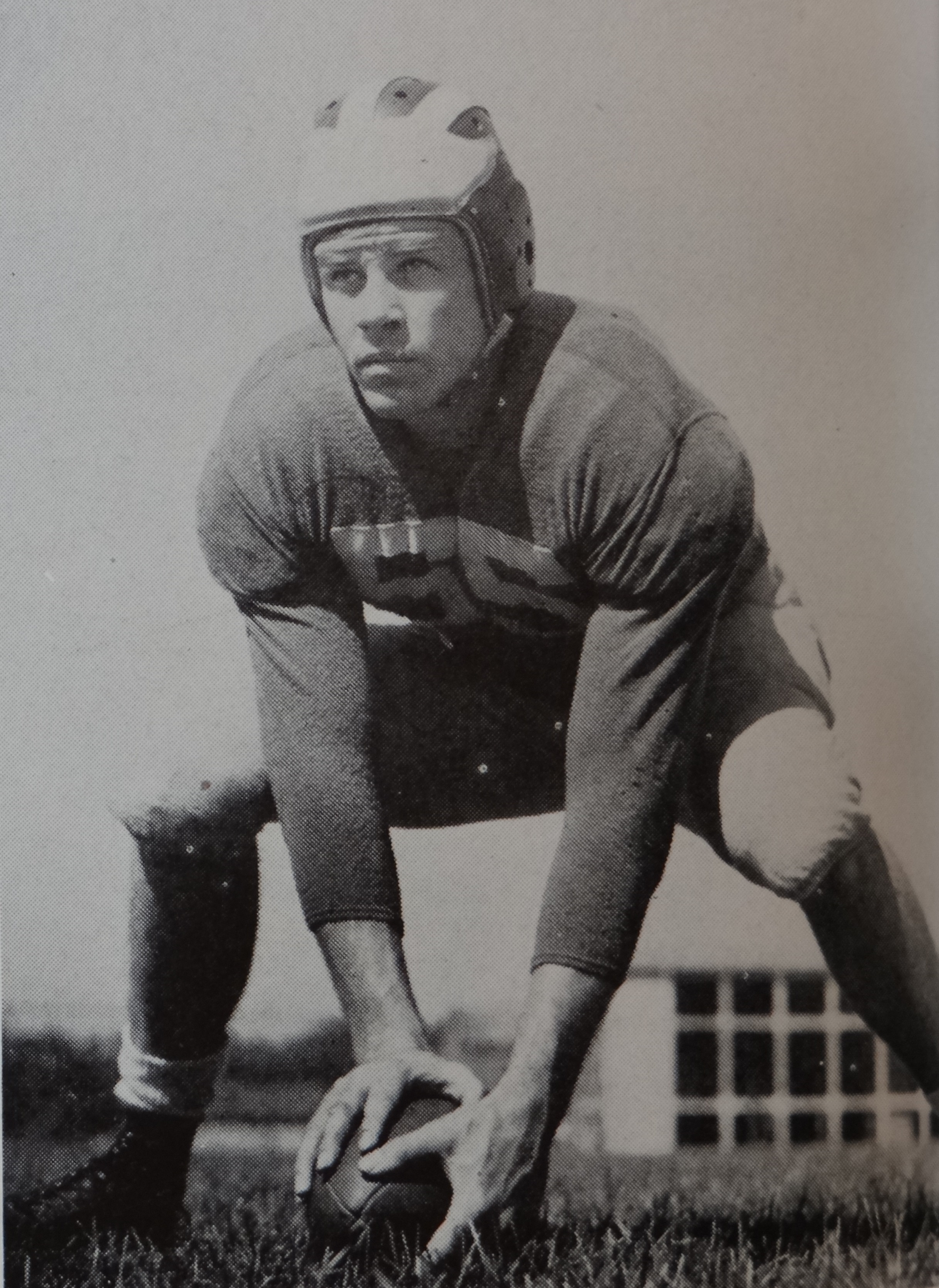
- White from 1948 Michiganensian

Biographical details
- Born: July 10, 1920; Wadley, Georgia, U.S.
- Died: November 21, 2005 (aged 85); Danville, Pennsylvania, U.S.

Playing career
- 1941–1942: Ohio State
- 1946–1947: Michigan
- Position: Center

Coaching career (HC unless noted)
- 1948–1953: Michigan (assistant)
- 1954–1979: Penn State (defensive line)

Administrative career (AD unless noted)
- 1980–1982: Penn State (assistant AD)

Accomplishments and honors

Championships
- 1942 Ohio State Buckeyes (player); 1947 Michigan Wolverines (player); 1948 Michigan Wolverines (assistant coach)

Awards
- Second-team All-American (1947); 1948 College All-Star Game

John T. White (July 10, 1920 – November 21, 2005) was an American college football assistant coach, and a second-team 1947 College Football All-American center who played for national championship teams at both the University of Michigan and Ohio State University. White also played basketball for the Ohio State Buckeyes men's basketball team. Although White was drafted to play professional football, he chose to pursue a career as an assistant football coach for both the Michigan Wolverines and Penn State Nittany Lions football teams. He served as an assistant coach for a national champion at Michigan and three undefeated and untied seasons at Penn State. White served in the United States Army during World War II causing a break in his collegiate education.

== Personal ==
White was born in Wadley, Georgia and raised in River Rouge, Michigan. White earned his bachelor's degree in education from Michigan in 1948. He earned his master's degree in education at Michigan. White married the former Verna McQueen, and they had one son, Brian. Verna and White were married for 53 years before she died at 75 in October 1997 of emphysema.

== Athletic career ==
At River Rouge High School he played baseball, basketball and football before attending Ohio State. In 1942, he lettered in both basketball and football at Ohio State as a sophomore. He was a player for national champions on both the 1942 Ohio State Buckeyes football team and the 1947 Michigan Wolverines football team. He is one of only three players (along with Justin Boren and Howard Yerges) to have played for the football teams of both Michigan and Ohio State; this low number can be attributed to the strong rivalry between the two schools.

White matriculated at Ohio State University, where he earned a varsity letter playing for Paul Brown's 1942 team. White played at Ohio State for two years. He served in the United States Army from 1943 to 1945 during World War II and lettered two years for Fritz Crisler's Michigan teams. His younger brother, Paul was captain at Michigan when White transferred. J. T. was the starting center for the 1946 and 1947 teams. The Football Writers Association of America named him as their second-team All-American center for the 1947 college football season. White played in the 1948 College All-Star Game, and he was drafted by two pro teams: the Detroit Lions with the first pick of the 21st round (186th overall) in the 1947 NFL draft and the Brooklyn Dodgers of the All-America Football Conference.

== Coaching career ==
He chose to join Bennie Oosterbaan's Michigan coaching staff for six years (1948–53), including the national champion 1948 Michigan Wolverines football team. Then, for 26 seasons, from 1954 through 1979, J.T. was a defensive line coach at Penn State, first under Rip Engle and then under Joe Paterno, who took over in 1966. When White moved to Penn State to work for Engle, the staff included Paterno, Earle Bruce, Sever Toretti, Jim O'Hora and Jim Patrick. His tenure on the staff included three undefeated and untied seasons (1968, 1969 and 1973). Subsequently, from 1980–1982, he served as assistant to the Penn State Athletic Director.

== See also ==
- List of Michigan Wolverines football All-Americans
