= Gene Derricotte =

American football player (1926–2023)

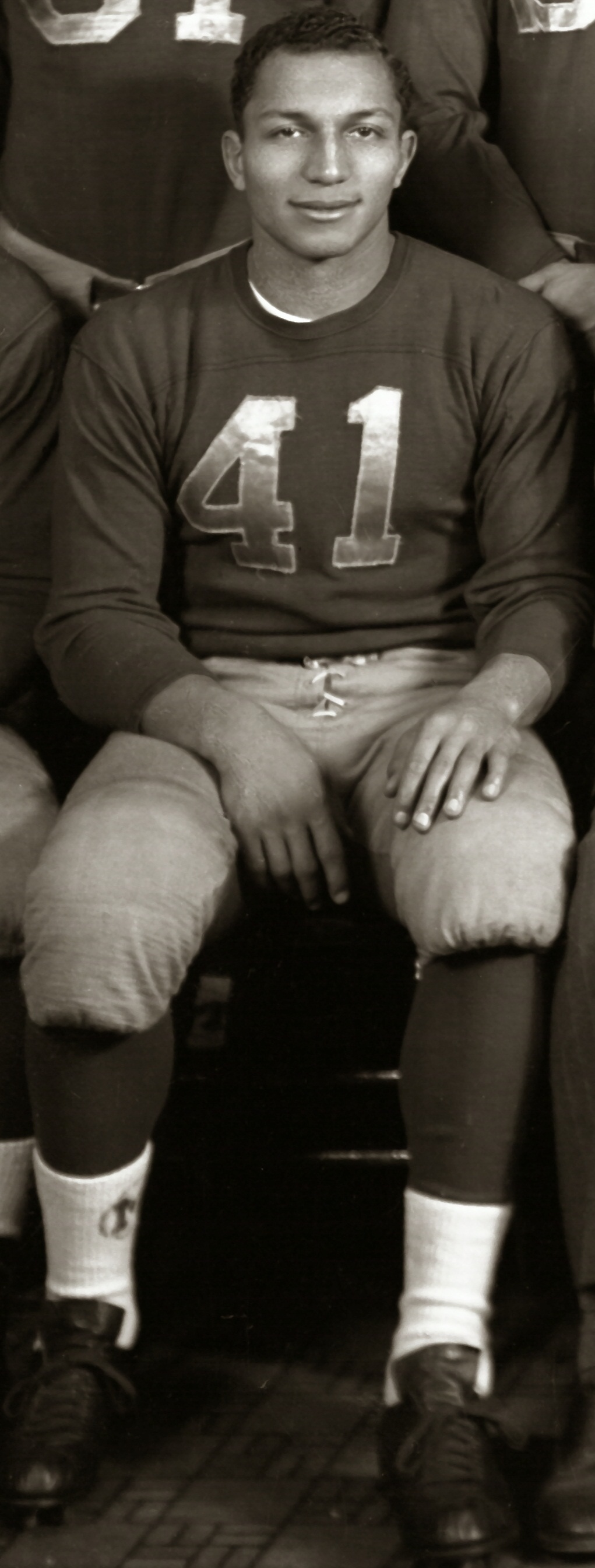
- Derricotte from 1948 team portrait

No. 41
- Positions: Halfback, return specialist

Personal information
- Born: June 14, 1926; Fostoria, Ohio, U.S.
- Died: March 31, 2023 (aged 96)
- Listed height: 5 ft 10 in (1.78 m)
- Listed weight: 178 lb (81 kg)

Career information
- College: Michigan

Awards and highlights
- National champion (1948); Michigan all-time records: Single-season punt return average (1947–); Single-season punt return TDs (1947–); Career punt return TDs (1947–); Single-season interceptions (1946–1949); Career interceptions (1948–1949); Big Ten all-time records: Single-season punt return TDs (1947–2004)

Eugene Derricotte (June 14, 1926 – March 31, 2023) was an American college football player who was a halfback and return specialist for the Michigan Wolverines from 1944 to 1948. He was one of the first African-American athletes at the University of Michigan in the era when college football was beginning to integrate. Derricotte established school records that still stand as a punt returner for the Wolverines. He also established several short-lived school interceptions records. Derricotte also served as a Tuskegee Airman and later had a successful career in dentistry while continuing to serve in the military.

== Early years and college ==
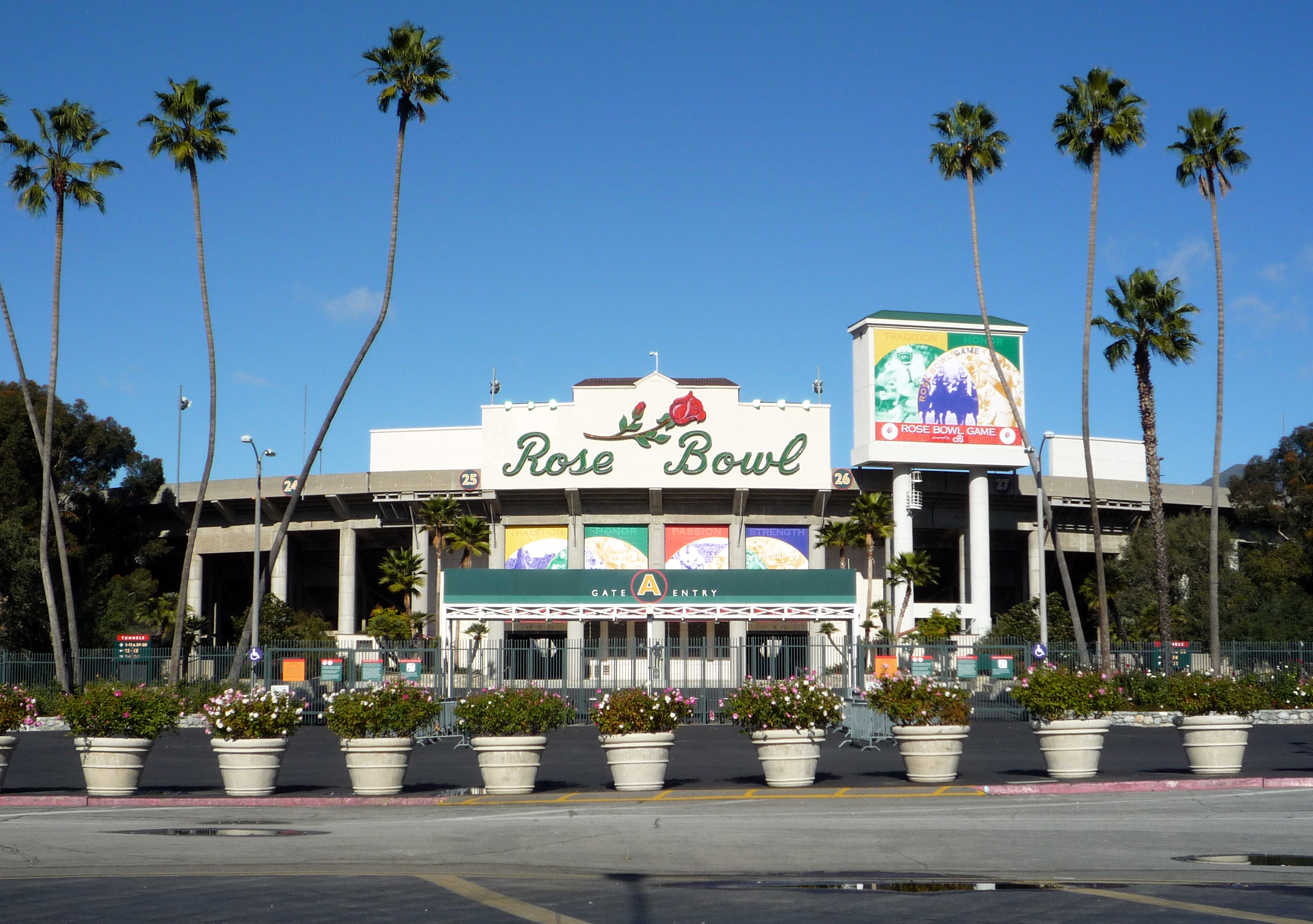
Derricotte caught a 45-yard reception in the 1948 Rose Bowl.

Derricotte was born in Fostoria, Ohio, on June 14, 1926, and he grew up in Defiance, Ohio, where his father Clarence Cobb Derricotte ran a shoe repair business. In addition to Eugene, Bessie M. Anderson and Clarence Derricotte had two other sons, Bruce and Raymond. Gene married Jeanne E. Hagans and had a son Robert. Years later, Gene Derricotte would tell a reporter friend of his that he always wondered about his ancestry. He knew his name was French, but he was not able to find out much more about his roots.

While Eugene (or Gene, as he was often called) would become known for his athletic ability, he was also an excellent student, graduating from Defiance High School as the class valedictorian. Because he was a star athlete, he was awarded a scholarship to attend the University of Michigan. He enrolled in 1944, majoring in chemistry. While there, he became the first African-American to play in the offensive backfield for the Michigan Wolverines football program. Derricotte was an immediate contributor as the team's leading ground gainer in 1944. Press reports in 1944 typically referred to his race, identifying him as "freshman negro halfback," the "Negro speedster," the "speedy negro freshman," or the "lithe Negro star."

In December 1944, Derricotte was drafted into the United States Army. He was initially assigned as an artillery cannoneer with the 16th Separate Training Battalion in Fort Bragg, North Carolina. He later transferred to the Tuskegee Airmen pilot training program in Tuskegee, Alabama. Derricotte graduated from the program in May 1946. With the war over, he was discharged, and he returned to the University of Michigan to continue his education.

When he returned from the war in 1946 and resumed his education, he continued to excel in academics as well as sports. He maintained a "B" average and majored in pharmacy. In football, he shared the starting duties at the left halfback position with Bob Chappuis, who went on to All-Big Ten Conference honors in 1946. After starting nine games at left halfback for Fritz Crisler in 1944, Derricotte started five games to Chappuis' four in 1946. In the first game of the 1946 season, Derricotte threw a touchdown pass to Paul White and was described as the "sparkplug of the Michigan running game." Derricotte broke his nose in a scrimmage after the first game and saw limited playing time, which gave Chappuis an opportunity to shine.

Derricotte, who wore No. 41 while a Michigan Wolverine, had an unusual college football career because he began by starting many games, but gradually became more of a return specialist. In 1946, Derricotte also set the school's single-season interceptions record. By 1947, Chappuis had become an All-American halfback and Derricotte's only start was one game at quarterback. In 1947, Derricotte averaged 24.8 yards on punt returns, which still stands as a Michigan school record (min 1.2 returns/game). In fact, Derricotte still ranks fifth in NCAA Division I-A history in average yards per punt return. Oddly, the NCAA recognizes that he had 347 return yards on 14 returns that season (24.8). The University of Michigan claims he had 396 punt return yards that season (which would be 24.8 with 16 returns), but did not average at least 12.3 with a minimum of 15 returns to rank in the top ten in school history. The Big Ten record book claims he did not have at least a 17.4 return average with a minimum of 10 returns to place in the top ten in conference history. The 396 was a Michigan record from 1947 until 1990 when Tripp Welborne totaled 455 in 1990. In 1948, he again only had one start, but this time back at halfback under new coach, Bennie Oosterbaan. Both the 1947 Michigan Wolverines football team, Fritz Crisler's last team, and the 1948 Michigan Wolverines football team were undefeated and finished the season ranked number 1 in the Associated Press polls. The 1947 team referred to as "Michigan's Mad Magicians" is considered to be the greatest University of Michigan football team of all time.

During his Michigan career, Derricotte returned four punts for touchdowns, which set a school record that has since been tied (but not exceeded) by Steve Breaston and Derrick Alexander. He also returned three punts for touchdowns in one season, which was a Big Ten Conference record for more than 50 years until Ted Ginn Jr. returned four punts for touchdowns in 2004. The record had been tied by both Ira Matthews of the Wisconsin Badgers (1976) and Tim Dwight of the Iowa Hawkeyes (1997).

In the Associated Press poll at the end of the 1947 season, the Notre Dame Fighting Irish were ranked ahead of the University of Michigan, though both teams were undefeated. Some noted that every Southern AP voter had voted for Notre Dame, which had yet to integrate, whereas three of Michigan's star players (Derricotte, Bob Mann and Len Ford) were African-American. The Southern schools refused even to schedule games against schools that played African-American players.

Michigan beat USC, 49–0, in the 1948 Rose Bowl game. Derricotte scored a touchdown on a 45-yard reception from Henry Fonde in the game. Derricotte also completed a ten-yard pass during the game.

Over the course of his Michigan career, he set the career interceptions record. Neither Derricotte's career nor single-season interceptions records lasted very long. The career interception record lasted one season and the single-season record lasted three. He was also involved in only the third time Michigan had two 100-yard rushers in the same game.

== Professional career ==
Derricotte was selected in the first round of the All-America Football Conference draft in 1949 by the undefeated league defending champion, Cleveland Browns. He was injured during training camp with the Browns at the end of July 1949 while standing along the sidelines playing catch with a teammate. Coach Paul Brown said Derricotte had a chronic knee injury that only rest could cure. Accordingly, Brown placed Derricotte on waivers, but said hoped he could return for another tryout in 1950.

Derricotte was inducted into the University of Michigan Athletic Hall of Honor in 1987. Derricotte also had a successful career in dentistry. In 1950, Derricotte earned a degree in pharmacy, and in 1958, he earned a further degree in dentistry. After receiving the second degree, Derricotte returned to the military, serving in Vietnam, as well as South Dakota, Massachusetts, Texas, Hawaii, Virginia, Illinois, and at the United States Air Force Academy before his retirement in 1985. Derricotte then relocated to San Antonio, Texas, where he started another career at the University of Texas Health Science Center. He married, and he and his wife Jeanne had a son, Rob. The family continued to reside in the San Antonio area. Derricotte retired from dentistry in 2000.

In March 2007, he was one of many Tuskegee Airmen honored at a ceremony held in Washington, D.C., where they were awarded the Congressional Gold Medal in recognition of their service to the United States. They were also honored at another ceremony in mid-June 2007 at Randolph Air Force Base in Universal City, Texas, near San Antonio.

Detricotte died on March 31, 2023, at age 96.

== See also ==
- List of NCAA major college football yearly punt and kickoff return leaders
