= Bill Kay (tackle) =

American football player (1925–2007)

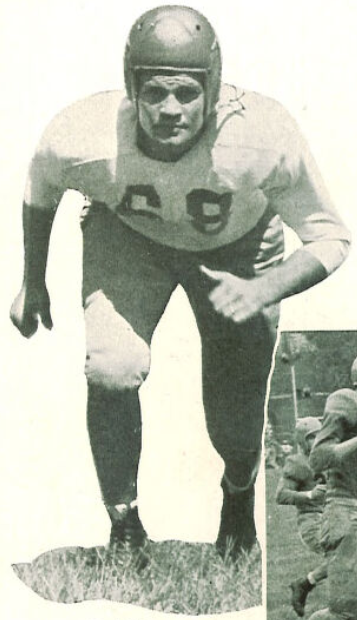
- Kay c. 1948

No. 33
- Position: Tackle

Personal information
- Born: April 4, 1925; Walnut, Iowa, U.S.
- Died: May 23, 2007 (aged 82); Omaha, Nebraska, U.S.
- Listed height: 6 ft 5 in (1.96 m)
- Listed weight: 220 lb (100 kg)

Career information
- College: Iowa
- NFL draft: 1949: 4th round, 35th overall pick

Career history
- New York Giants (1949)

Awards and highlights
- Second-team All-American (1948); First-team All-Big Nine (1948); Second-team All-Big Nine (1946)

William A. Kay (April 4, 1925 – May 23, 2007) was an American football tackle in the National Football League (NFL). He played college football for the University of Iowa.

== University of Iowa ==
Kay was a prominent member of the Iowa Hawkeyes football team of the University of Iowa. His all-star jersey can be seen in the Iowa Football Museum.

=== 1946 ===
Kay is listed as team MVP. Kay helped clear the way for Bob Smith, the team's first 500-yard rusher since Ozzie Simmons in 1936.

=== 1948 ===
He was selected second-team All-American and first-team All-Big Nine by the Associated Press. He led the conference in minutes played. In his final game, he blocked a punt and recovered it in the end zone for an Iowa touchdown in a win over Boston University. Kay also played in all-star football games.

== New York Giants ==
Kay entered the 1949 season injured. He was drafted in the fourth round of the 1949 NFL draft by the New York Giants. Kay was one of seven tackles signed to the team in 1949. Kay signed a one-year contract reportedly worth $6,750. He entered the draft injured and unfortunately, never played a professional game.
