= Ed Hirsch =

American gridiron football player (1921–2000)

No. 73, 25, 36, 80, 44
- Positions: Quarterback, fullback

Personal information
- Born: March 26, 1921; Clarence, New York, U.S.
- Died: January 28, 2000 (aged 78); Irving, New York, U.S.
- Listed height: 5 ft 10 in (1.78 m)
- Listed weight: 207 lb (94 kg)

Career information
- High school: Williamsville South (Williamsville, New York)
- College: Northwestern (1940-1942, 1946)
- NFL draft: 1944: 16th round, 161st overall pick

Career history
- Buffalo Bills (1947-1949); Toronto Argonauts (1950-1951); Hamilton Tiger-Cats (1952)

Awards and highlights
- Grey Cup champion (1950)

Career AAFC statistics
- Rushing yards: 7
- Rushing average: 1.8
- Interceptions: 3
- Touchdowns: 1
- Stats at Pro Football Reference

Edward Norman "Buckets" Hirsch (March 26, 1921 – January 28, 2000) was an American gridiron football player who played for the Toronto Argonauts and Hamilton Tiger-Cats. He won the Grey Cup with the Argonauts in 1950. He played college football at Northwestern University. Hirsch also played in the All-America Football Conference (AAFC) from Buffalo Bills from 1947 to 1949.
