= John Cannady =

American football player (1923–2002)

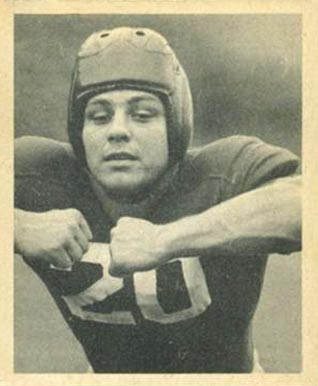
- Cannady on a 1948 Bowman football card

No. 20, 52
- Positions: Linebacker, center

Personal information
- Born: May 9, 1923; Charleston, South Carolina, U.S.
- Died: September 28, 2002 (aged 79); Charleston, South Carolina, U.S.
- Listed height: 6 ft 2 in (1.88 m)
- Listed weight: 227 lb (103 kg)

Career information
- High school: Spartanburg (Spartanburg, South Carolina); Owensboro (Owensboro, Kentucky)
- College: Indiana (1943-1946)
- NFL draft: 1947: 3rd round, 22nd overall pick

Career history
- New York Giants (1947–1954)

Awards and highlights
- 2× Pro Bowl (1950, 1952); First-team All-Big Nine (1946); Second-team All-Big Ten (1945)

Career NFL statistics
- Games played: 92
- Games started: 77
- Interceptions: 14
- Fumble recoveries: 10
- Stats at Pro Football Reference

John Hanley Cannady (September 5, 1923 – September 28, 2002) was an American professional football player who was a linebacker for the New York Giants of the National Football League (NFL). He played college football for the Indiana Hoosiers and was selected in the third round of the 1947 NFL draft.

== Career ==
The first professional football player from Charleston, South Carolina, known as "Big John," he was the New York Giants' third-round draft pick (22nd overall) in 1947 and played from 1947 to 1954. A teammate of Frank Gifford from 1952 to 1954, Big John was a member of the New York Giants’ 1950 team that finished with a 10–2 record and tied for first place in the American Conference. He played in the league's Pro Bowl game in 1950 and 1952.

He played in the first NFL Pro Bowl. Big John was a member of the National Football League Players Association, and Indiana University Members Association. He was named to the South Carolina Athletic Hall of Fame in 1991, and to the Post and Courier’s list of South Carolina's 100 greatest athletes of the 20th century. In retirement he owned and operated a popular bar on East Bay Street in Charleston called "Big John's".
