= Vic Schwall =

American football player (1925–2000)

No. 37, 90
- Position: Halfback

Personal information
- Born: January 21, 1925; Oak Park, Illinois, U.S.
- Died: October 14, 2000 (aged 75); Morton Grove, Illinois, U.S.
- Listed height: 5 ft 8 in (1.73 m)
- Listed weight: 190 lb (86 kg)

Career information
- High school: Chicago (IL) Schurz
- College: Northwestern
- NFL draft: 1947: 1st round, 10th overall pick

Career history
- Chicago Cardinals (1947–1950)

Awards and highlights
- NFL champion (1947); First-team All-Big Nine (1946)

Career NFL statistics
- Rushing yards: 301
- Rushing average: 5.4
- Receptions: 6
- Receiving yards: 28
- Total touchdowns: 3
- Stats at Pro Football Reference

Victor Henry Schwall (January 21, 1925 – October 14, 2000) was an American professional football halfback who played professionally in the National Football League (NFL) for four seasons with the Chicago Cardinals.
