= Elmer Madar =

American football player and coach (1920–1972)

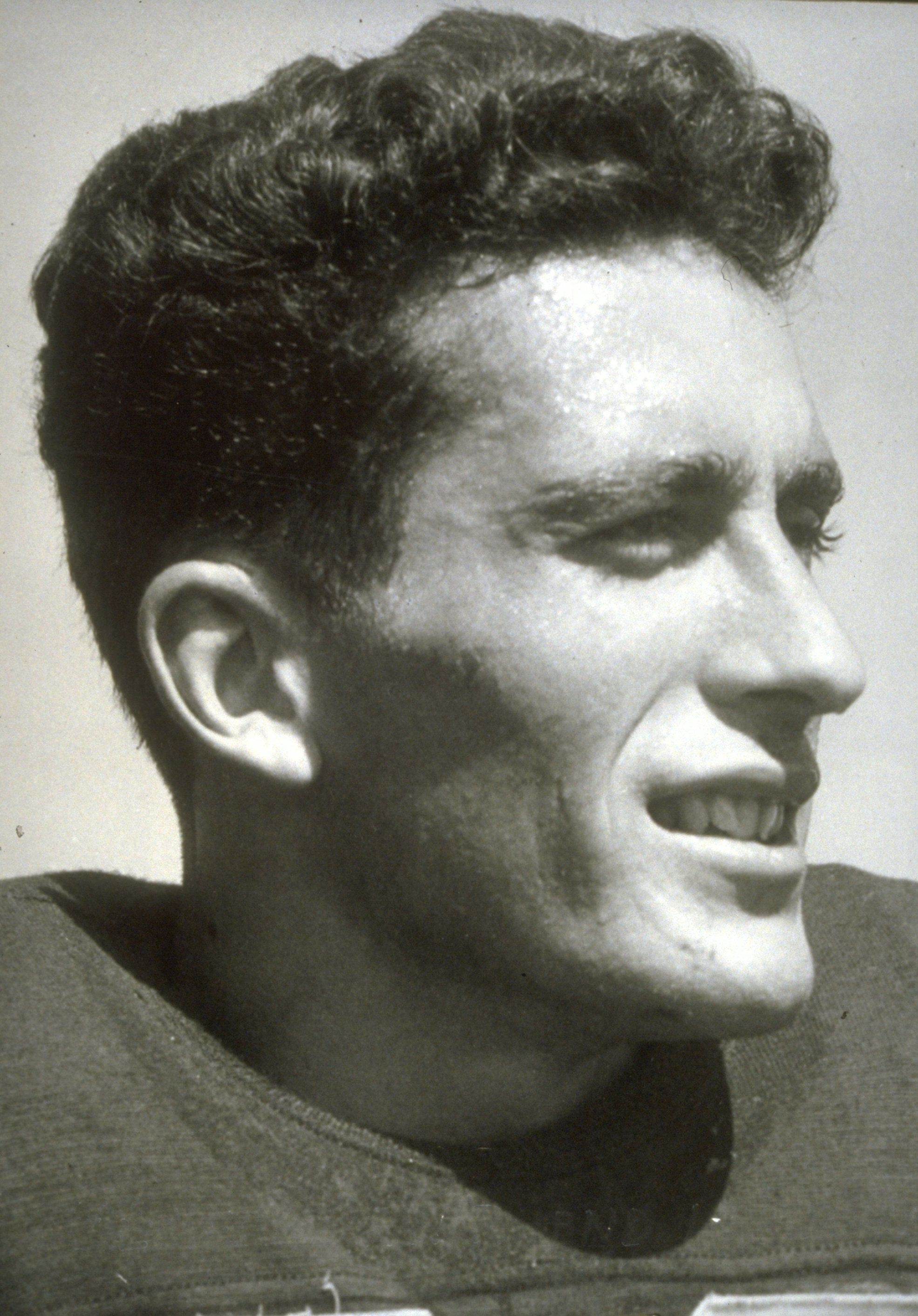
- Madar from 1947 Michiganensian

No. 53
- Positions: End, quarterback

Personal information
- Born: November 28, 1920; Sykesville, Pennsylvania, U.S.
- Died: February 9, 1972 (aged 51); Detroit, Michigan, U.S.
- Listed height: 5 ft 11 in (1.80 m)
- Listed weight: 185 lb (84 kg)

Career information
- High school: Northeastern (Detroit)
- College: Michigan (1939-1942, 1946)
- NFL draft: 1947: 20th round, 176th overall pick

Career history
- Baltimore Colts (1947)

Awards and highlights
- First-team All-American (1946); First-team All-Big Nine (1946)

Career AAFC statistics
- Receptions: 8
- Receiving yards: 53
- Return yards: 14
- Stats at Pro Football Reference

Elmer F. Madar (November 28, 1920 – February 9, 1972) was an All American football player at the University of Michigan in 1942 and 1946. He played one season of professional football for the Baltimore Colts of the All-America Football Conference (AAFC).

== Biography ==
=== Early life ===
Elmer Madar was born in Sykesville, Pennsylvania on November 28, 1920.

Madar played football at Northeastern High School in Detroit.

=== Collegiate football ===
He was a backup quarterback for the University of Michigan in 1941 and moved to end in 1942 where he played in 10 games, scored two touchdowns and made 12 receptions for 160 yards. He was part of the 1942 Michigan line with Merv Pregulman, Julius Franks, Al Wistert, Bob Kolesar, Bill Pritula and Phil Sharpe that was known as the "Seven Oak Posts," due to their reputation for not using substitutes.

Madar served in the Air Corps during World War II, but returned to the University of Michigan after the war. In 1946, he played in more minutes than any other player on Fritz Crisler's football team. In December 1946, he was named to the Associated Press All-American team,

=== Professional football ===
Madar was the first pick in the 1947 All-America Football Conference draft by the Miami Seahawks. Late in September 1947, Madar was signed by the Baltimore Colts and joined the team as an end for the rest of the 1947 season. He appeared for the Colts in 9 games — starting in 6 — during which he caught 8 passes for 53 yards.

It would be his only year as a professional football player.

In March 1948, he was hired as the end coach at Harvard University, working with fellow Michigan alum and head coach Arthur Valpey. He was assistant coach for the Holy Cross Crusaders in 1952 and 1953 but resigned in 1954 to seek a coaching job closer to his Michigan home.

=== Life after football ===
While he was an assistant coach at Holy Cross, Madar worked in the off-season in the sales division for the Altes Brewing Company, part of the National Brewing Company of Baltimore.

Madar subsequently became a teacher in the Detroit public schools.

=== Death and legacy ===
Madar died of gunshot wounds in 1972 at his brother's house in Detroit. Police reported that the wounds were believed to be self inflicted.

Elmer Madar was the brother of Olga Madar, a trailblazing functionary with the United Auto Workers union (UAW).

== See also ==
- List of Michigan Wolverines football All-Americans
