= 1946 All-Big Nine Conference football team =

The 1946 All-Big Nine Conference football team consists of American football players selected to the All-Big Ten Conference teams selected by the Associated Press (AP) and United Press (UP) for the 1946 Big Nine Conference football season. The top vote getters in the AP polling were Bob Chappuis and Warren Amling, who each received 17 out of 18 possible points.

== All-Big Nine selections ==
=== Ends ===
- Elmer Madar, Michigan (AP-1, UP-1)
- Cecil Souders, Ohio State (AP-1, UP-2)
- Ike Owens, Illinois (UP-1)
- Sam Zatkoff, Illinois (UP-2)

=== Tackles ===
- Russ Deal, Indiana (AP-1, UP-1)
- Warren Amling, Ohio State (AP-1, UP-2)
- Jack Carpenter, Michigan (UP-1)
- Bill Kay, Iowa (AP-2, UP-2)
- Bill Ivy, Northwestern (AP-2)

=== Guards ===
- Alex Agase, Illinois (AP-1, UP-1)
- Dick Barwegen, Purdue (AP-1, UP-2)
- Earl Banks, Iowa (UP-1)
- Dominic Tomasi, Michigan (UP-2)

=== Centers ===
- John Cannady, Indiana (AP-1, UP-2)
- Fred Negus, Wisconsin (AP-2, UP-1)

=== Quarterbacks ===
- Ben Raimondi, Indiana (AP-1, UP-1)
- Pete Pihos, Indiana (UP-2)

=== Halfbacks ===
- Bob Chappuis, Michigan (AP-1, UP-1)
- Vic Schwall, Northwestern (AP-1, UP-1)
- Julie Rykovich, Illinois (UP-2)
- Billy Bye, Minnesota (UP-2)

=== Fullbacks ===
- Dick Hoerner, Iowa (AP-1, UP-2)
- Joe Whisler, Ohio State (UP-1 [back])

== Key ==
AP = Associated Press, chosen by conference coaches

UP = United Press, based on polling of conference coaches, scouts and newspapermen

Bold = Consensus first-team selection of both the AP and UPI

== See also ==
- 1946 College Football All-America Team
