= 1947 NFL draft =

National Football League draft

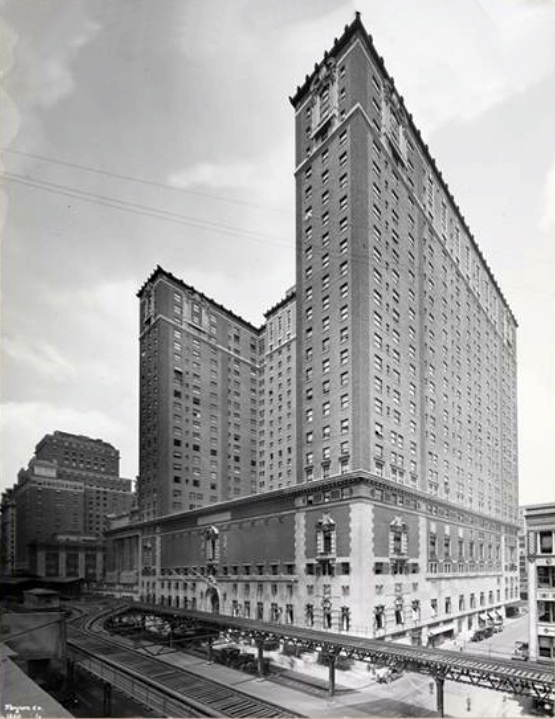
- Commodore Hotel (location of the draft)

General information
- Date: December 16, 1946
- Location: Commodore Hotel in New York City, NY

Overview
- 300 total selections in 32 rounds
- League: NFL
- First selection: Bob Fenimore, HB; Chicago Bears
- Most selections (32): Chicago Bears
- Fewest selections (29): Chicago Cardinals; Philadelphia Eagles
- Hall of Famers: 3: WR Dante Lavelli; DB Tom Landry; DT Art Donovan

The 1947 NFL draft was held on December 16, 1946, at the Commodore Hotel in New York City, New York.

The National Football League in this draft made the first overall pick, a bonus pick determined by lottery. The Chicago Bears won the first lottery, and used the pick to select halfback Bob Fenimore. This lottery process ended in 1958.

This draft was the last time the Bears had the first overall pick in a draft until 2024.

== Player selections ==
†	=Pro Bowler (Note: Players are identified as Pro Bowlers if they were selected for the Pro Bowl at any time in their career.)
‡	=Hall of Famer (Note: Players are identified as a Hall of Famer if they have been inducted into the Pro Football Hall of Fame.)

Positions key
B	Back	BB	Blocking back	C	Center
E	End	FB	Fullback	G	Guard
OT	Offensive tackle	TB	Tailback	WB	Wingback

Rnd.	Pick	Team	Player	Pos.	College	Notes
1	1	Chicago Bears	Bob Fenimore	HB	Oklahoma A&M	Bonus lottery pick
1	2	Detroit Lions	Glenn Davis ^{†}	HB	Army	1946 Heisman Trophy winner
1	3	Boston Yanks	Fritz Barzilauskas	G	Yale	
1	4	Washington Redskins	Cal Rossi	B	UCLA	Former 1946 draft first round pick; never ended up playing.
1	5	Pittsburgh Steelers	Hub Bechtol	E	Texas	
1	6	Green Bay Packers	Ernie Case	QB	UCLA	
1	7	Chicago Cardinals	DeWitt Coulter ^{†}	T	Army	Member of the Giants
1	8	Philadelphia Eagles	Neill Armstrong	E	Oklahoma A&M	
1	9	Los Angeles Rams	Herman Wedemeyer	B	St. Mary's (CA)	
1	10	New York Giants	Vic Schwall	HB	Northwestern	
1	11	Chicago Bears	Don Kindt ^{†}	DB	Wisconsin	
2	12	Detroit Lions	Russ Thomas	T	Ohio State	
2	13	Boston Yanks	Walter Heap	B	Texas	
3	14	Detroit Lions	Jim Kekeris	T	Missouri	
3	15	Boston Yanks	John Rapacz	C	Oklahoma	
3	16	Pittsburgh Steelers	John Mastrangelo	T	Notre Dame	
3	17	Washington Redskins	Gene Knight	B	LSU	
3	18	Chicago Cardinals	Ermal Allen	QB	Kentucky	
3	19	Philadelphia Eagles	Bill Mackrides	QB	Nevada	
3	20	Green Bay Packers	Burr Baldwin	E	UCLA	
3	21	Los Angeles Rams	Don Paul ^{†}	LB	UCLA	
3	22	New York Giants	John Cannady ^{†}	LB	Indiana	
3	23	Chicago Bears	Frank Minini	HB	San Jose State	
4	24	Detroit Lions	Charley Hoover	C	Vanderbilt	
4	25	Boston Yanks	Al Baldwin	E	Arkansas	
5	26	Detroit Lions	Bob Chappuis	TB	Michigan	
5	27	Boston Yanks	Carroll Vogelaar	T	San Francisco	
5	28	Washington Redskins	Hank Foldberg	E	Army	
5	29	Pittsburgh Steelers	Frank Wydo	T	Cornell	
5	30	Philadelphia Eagles	George Savitsky	T	Penn	
5	31	Green Bay Packers	Paul "Buddy" Burris	G	Oklahoma	
5	32	Chicago Bears	Lloyd Merriman	B	Stanford	
5	33	Los Angeles Rams	Gordon Gray	B	USC	
5	34	New York Giants	Nelson Greene	T	Tulsa	
5	35	Chicago Bears	Jim Canady	B	Texas	
6	36	Detroit Lions	Bernie Gallagher	G	Penn	
6	37	Boston Yanks	George Sullivan	E	Notre Dame	
6	38	Pittsburgh Steelers	Frank Aschenbrenner	RB	Northwestern	
6	39	Washington Redskins	Mike Garzoni	G	USC	
6	40	Green Bay Packers	Gene Wilson	E	SMU	
6	41	Chicago Cardinals	Ben Raimondi	TB	Indiana	
6	42	Chicago Bears	Roger Stephens	B	Cincinnati	
6	43	Los Angeles Rams	Paul Evanson	T	Oregon State	
6	44	New York Giants	Bob Davis	T	Georgia Tech	
6	45	Chicago Bears	Harlan Wetz	T	Texas	
7	46	Detroit Lions	Ed Grain	G	Penn	
7	47	Boston Yanks	Joe Watt	HB	Syracuse	
7	48	Washington Redskins	Bill Gray	G	Oregon State	
7	49	Pittsburgh Steelers	Bryant Meeks	C	South Carolina	
7	50	Chicago Cardinals	Howard Turner	B	NC State	
7	51	Philadelphia Eagles	Tony Yovicsin	E	Miami (FL)	
7	52	Green Bay Packers	Dick Connors	B	Northwestern	
7	53	Los Angeles Rams	Bill Smyth	DE	Penn State	
7	54	New York Giants	Duke Iversen	B	Oregon	
7	55	Chicago Bears	Reid Moseley	E	Georgia	
8	56	Detroit Lions	Harvey James	C	Miami (FL)	
8	57	Boston Yanks	Bill Chipley	E	Washington & Lee	
8	58	Pittsburgh Steelers	Jerry Shipkey ^{†}	LB	UCLA	
8	59	Washington Redskins	Hank Harris	G	Texas	
8	60	Chicago Cardinals	George Maddock	T	Northwestern	
8	61	Philadelphia Eagles	Al Satterfield	T	Vanderbilt	
8	62	Green Bay Packers	Monte Moncrief	T	Texas A&M	
8	63	Los Angeles Rams	Bill McGovern	C	Washington	
8	64	New York Giants	Frank Muehlheuser	FB	Colgate	
8	65	Chicago Bears	Allen Smith	E	Ole Miss	
9	66	Detroit Lions	Kale Alexander	T	South Carolina	
9	67	Boston Yanks	Gene Malinowski	B	Detroit	
9	68	Washington Redskins	Roy Kurrasch	E	UCLA	
9	69	Pittsburgh Steelers	Bert Vander Clute	G	Wesleyan	
9	70	Chicago Cardinals	Art Dufelmeier	B	Illinois	
9	71	Philadelphia Eagles	Bob Leonetti	G	Wake Forest	
9	72	Green Bay Packers	Bob McDougal	FB	Miami (FL)	
9	73	Los Angeles Rams	Max Partin	B	Tennessee	
9	74	New York Giants	John Novitsky	T	Oklahoma City	
9	75	Chicago Bears	Dwight Eddleman	B	Illinois	
10	76	Detroit Lions	Bump Elliott	B	Michigan	
10	77	Boston Yanks	Bob Hazelhurst	HB	Denver	
10	78	Pittsburgh Steelers	Paul Gibson	E	NC State	
10	79	Washington Redskins	Ernie Williamson	T	North Carolina	
10	80	Philadelphia Eagles	Ulysses Cornogg	T	Wake Forest	
10	81	Green Bay Packers	Bob Kelly	HB	Navy	
10	82	Chicago Cardinals	Ray Ramsey	B	Bradley	
10	83	Los Angeles Rams	Carl Samuelson	DT	Nebraska	
10	84	New York Giants	Fred Mullis	B	Chattanooga	
10	85	Chicago Bears	Arnold Tucker	B	Army	
11	86	Detroit Lions	Pete Sullivan	T	Detroit	
11	87	Boston Yanks	Alex Sidorik	T	Mississippi State	
11	88	Washington Redskins	L. G. Carmody	B	Central Washington	
11	89	Pittsburgh Steelers	Jack Medd	C	Wesleyan	
11	90	Chicago Cardinals	Dave Wallace	B	Oklahoma	
11	91	Philadelphia Eagles	Alex Sarkisian	C	Northwestern	
11	92	Green Bay Packers	Tom Moulton	C	Oklahoma A&M	
11	93	Los Angeles Rams	Russ Steger	B	Illinois	
11	94	New York Giants	Robert Hoernschemeyer ^{†}	B	Navy	
11	95	Chicago Bears	Larry Hatch	B	Washington	
12	96	Detroit Lions	LaVerne Camarata	B	Iowa State	
12	97	Boston Yanks	Wally Roberts	E	Holy Cross	
12	98	Pittsburgh Steelers	Jack Fitch	B	North Carolina	
12	99	Washington Redskins	U.S. Savage	E	Richmond	
12	100	Green Bay Packers	George Hills	G	Georgia Tech	
12	101	Chicago Cardinals	Charley Sarratt	QB	Oklahoma	
12	102	Philadelphia Eagles	Jerry D'Arcy	C	Tulsa	
12	103	Los Angeles Rams	Dante Lavelli^{‡}^{†}	E	Ohio State	
12	104	New York Giants	Hardy Brown ^{†}	LB	Tulsa	
12	105	Chicago Bears	Tony Adamle ^{†}	LB	Ohio State	
13	106	Detroit Lions	Walt Vezmar	G	Michigan State	
13	107	Boston Yanks	Bob Sullivan	HB	Iowa	
13	108	Washington Redskins	Bob Steckroth	E	William & Mary	
13	109	Pittsburgh Steelers	Ara Parseghian	HB	Miami (OH)	
13	110	Philadelphia Eagles	John Hamberger	T	SMU	
13	111	Green Bay Packers	Bob Skoglund	DE	Notre Dame	
13	112	Chicago Cardinals	Harden Cooper	T	Tulsa	
13	113	Los Angeles Rams	Mike Dimitro	G	UCLA	
13	114	New York Giants	Bill Hachten	G	Stanford	
13	115	Chicago Bears	Emile Fritz	G	Maryland	
14	116	Detroit Lions	Dick Hagen	E	Washington	
14	117	Boston Yanks	Leo Long	B	Duke	
14	118	Pittsburgh Steelers	Red Moore	G	Penn	
14	119	Washington Redskins	Weldon Edwards	T	TCU	
14	120	Chicago Cardinals	Carl Russ	B	Rice	
14	121	Philadelphia Eagles	Al Johnson	QB	Hardin–Simmons	
14	122	Green Bay Packers	Jack Mitchell	B	Oklahoma	
14	123	Los Angeles Rams	John Kissell	DT	Boston College	
14	124	New York Giants	Herschel "Ug" Fuson	B	Army	
14	125	Chicago Bears	Jim Turner	T	California	
15	126	Detroit Lions	J.W. Meeks	B	East Texas State	
15	127	Boston Yanks	Frank Parker	T	Holy Cross	
15	128	Washington Redskins	Earl Wheeler	C	Arkansas	
15	129	Pittsburgh Steelers	Larry Bruno	B	Geneva	
15	130	Green Bay Packers	Denny Crawford	G	Tennessee	
15	131	Chicago Cardinals	Buddy Mulligan	B	Duke	
15	132	Philadelphia Eagles	Joe Cook	B	Hardin–Simmons	
15	133	Los Angeles Rams	George Fuchs	B	Wisconsin	
15	134	New York Giants	John Fallon	T	Notre Dame	
15	135	Chicago Bears	Wayne Goodall	E	Oklahoma City	
16	136	Detroit Lions	Reed Nilsen	C	BYU	
16	137	Boston Yanks	Hugo Marcolini	B	St. Bonaventure	
16	138	Pittsburgh Steelers	Ralph Jenkins	C	Clemson	
16	139	Washington Redskins	Bill Gold	B	Tennessee	
16	140	Philadelphia Eagles	Jeff Durkota	FB	Penn State	
16	141	Green Bay Packers	Jim Callanan	E	USC	
16	142	Chicago Cardinals	Charles Smith	HB	Georgia	
16	143	Los Angeles Rams	Ralph Chubb	B	Michigan	
16	144	New York Giants	Bob Orlando	G	Colgate	
16	145	Chicago Bears	Verne Gagne	E	Minnesota	
17	146	Detroit Lions	Tommy James ^{†}	DB	Ohio State	
17	147	Boston Yanks	Marion Shirley	T	Oklahoma City	
17	148	Washington Redskins	Jack Hart	T	Detroit	
17	149	Pittsburgh Steelers	Elbie Nickel ^{†}	E	Cincinnati	
17	150	Chicago Cardinals	Bob Ravensberg	E	Indiana	
17	151	Green Bay Packers	Ted Scalissi	HB	Ripon	
17	152	Philadelphia Eagles	Hubert Shurtz	T	LSU	
17	153	Los Angeles Rams	Don Hardy	E	USC	
17	154	New York Giants	Frank Pulattie	B	SMU	
17	155	Chicago Bears	Wally Dreyer	DB	Michigan	
18	156	Detroit Lions	Ralph Maugham	E	Utah State	
18	157	Boston Yanks	Roland Nabors	LB	Texas Tech	
18	158	Pittsburgh Steelers	Bill Cregar	G	Holy Cross	
18	159	Washington Redskins	Tom Nichols	B	Richmond	
18	160	Green Bay Packers	Jim Goodman	T	Indiana	
18	161	Philadelphia Eagles	Hal Bell	B	Muhlenberg	
18	162	Chicago Cardinals	Barney Barnett	E	Northeastern State	
18	163	Los Angeles Rams	Ed Champagne	T	LSU	
18	164	New York Giants	Dick Brinkley	B	Wake Forest	
18	165	Chicago Bears	Walt Pupa	B	North Carolina	
19	166	Detroit Lions	Buryl Baty	B	Texas A&M	
19	167	Boston Yanks	Pat Kenelly	E	Southeastern Louisiana	
19	168	Washington Redskins	Harry Dowda	DB	Wake Forest	
19	169	Pittsburgh Steelers	Jerry Mulready	E	North Dakota State	
19	170	Philadelphia Eagles	T. J. Campion	T	Southeastern Louisiana	
19	171	Chicago Cardinals	Scotty Deeds	B	BYU	
19	172	Green Bay Packers	Dick Miller	G	Lawrence	
19	173	Los Angeles Rams	Jim Dewar	B	Indiana	
19	174	New York Giants	Frank Guess	B	Texas	
19	175	Chicago Bears	John McLellan	T	Montana State	
20	176	Detroit Lions	Elmer Madar	E	Michigan	
20	177	Boston Yanks	Darrell Waller	B	Washington State	
20	178	Pittsburgh Steelers	Warren Smith	T	Kansas Wesleyan	
20	179	Washington Redskins	Charlie Webb	E	LSU	
20	180	Chicago Cardinals	Clarence Esser	E	Wisconsin	
20	181	Green Bay Packers	Brad Ecklund ^{†}	C	Oregon	
20	182	Philadelphia Eagles	Fred Hall	G	LSU	
20	183	Los Angeles Rams	Ben Reiges	B	UCLA	
20	184	New York Giants	Tom Landry^{‡}^{†}	DB	Texas	
20	185	Chicago Bears	Bill Cromer	B	Texas	
21	186	Detroit Lions	J. T. White	E	Michigan	
21	187	Boston Yanks	Paul Hart	B	Delaware	
21	188	Washington Redskins	Elmo Bond	T	Washington State	
21	189	Pittsburgh Steelers	Fred Hamilton	T	Vanderbilt	
21	190	Green Bay Packers	Bob West	B	Colorado	
21	191	Philadelphia Eagles	Jim Clayton	T	Wyoming	
21	192	Chicago Cardinals	Shelton Ballard	C	LSU	
21	193	Los Angeles Rams	Leon McLaughlin ^{†}	C	UCLA	
21	194	New York Giants	Joe Ponsetto	B	Michigan	
21	195	Chicago Bears	Russ Reader	DB	Michigan State	
22	196	Detroit Lions	Carl Schuette	LB	Marquette	
22	197	Boston Yanks	Gene Lamoure	G	Fresno State	
22	198	Pittsburgh Steelers	Fred Taylor	E	TCU	
22	199	Washington Redskins	Jim Hefti	B	St. Lawrence	
22	200	Philadelphia Eagles	George Blomquist	E	NC State	
22	201	Chicago Cardinals	Wade Walker	T	Oklahoma	
22	202	Green Bay Packers	Maurice "Tex" Reilly	B	Colorado	
22	203	Los Angeles Rams	Charlie Elliott	T	Oregon	
22	204	New York Giants	Art Donovan^{‡}	DT	Boston College	
22	205	Chicago Bears	Jim Batchelor	B	East Texas State	
23	206	Detroit Lions	Steve Cipot	T	St. Bonaventure	
23	207	Boston Yanks	Hank Kolaskinski	B	Wyoming	
23	208	Washington Redskins	Tom Dudley	E	Virginia	
23	209	Pittsburgh Steelers	Binks Bushmiaer	B	Vanderbilt	
23	210	Chicago Cardinals	Tom Carroll	T	Minnesota	
23	211	Green Bay Packers	Ron Sockolov	T	California	
23	212	Philadelphia Eagles	Joe Haynes	C	Tulsa	
23	213	Los Angeles Rams	Lou Levanti	C	Illinois	
23	214	New York Giants	Hal Shoener	E	Iowa	
23	215	Chicago Bears	Al Lawler	HB	Texas	
24	216	Detroit Lions	Bill Cadenhead	B	Alabama	
24	217	Boston Yanks	Ed Heap	T	Texas	
24	218	Pittsburgh Steelers	Paul Davis	FB	Otterbein	
24	219	Washington Redskins	Bob Smith ^{†}	DB	Iowa	
24	220	Green Bay Packers	Herbert St. John	G	Georgia	
24	221	Philadelphia Eagles	Stanton Hense	E	Xavier	
24	222	Chicago Cardinals	Tom Dorsey	B	Brown	
24	223	Los Angeles Rams	J. D. Cheek	T	Oklahoma A&M	
24	224	New York Giants	Bill Moll	B	Connecticut	
24	225	Chicago Bears	Gordon Berlin	C	Washington	
25	226	Detroit Lions	Jim Cody	T	East Texas State	
25	227	Boston Yanks	John Polzin	G	TCU	
25	228	Washington Redskins	Hal Mullins	T	Duke	
25	229	Pittsburgh Steelers	Tommy Kalmanir	HB	Nevada	
25	230	Philadelphia Eagles	Johnny Kelly	B	Rice	
25	231	Chicago Cardinals	Otto Schnellbacher ^{†}	DB	Kansas	
25	232	Green Bay Packers	Fred Redeker	B	Cincinnati	
25	233	Los Angeles Rams	Bob Dal Porto	B	California	
25	234	New York Giants	Dick Thomas	G	Mississippi Southern	
25	235	Chicago Bears	John Cunningham	E	California	
26	236	Detroit Lions	Earl Maves	WB	Wisconsin	
26	237	Boston Yanks	Dave Bloxom	B	TCU	
26	238	Pittsburgh Steelers	Don Mohr	E	Baldwin Wallace	
26	239	Washington Redskins	Francis Bocoka	E	Washington State	
26	240	Chicago Cardinals	Larry Joe	B	Penn State	
26	241	Green Bay Packers	Herm Lubker	E	Arkansas	
26	242	Philadelphia Eagles	H. J. Roberts	G	Rice	
26	243	Los Angeles Rams	Gene Standefer	B	Texas Tech	
26	244	New York Giants	Ralph Stewart	C	Missouri	
26	245	Chicago Bears	Max Morris	E	Northwestern	
27	246	Detroit Lions	Bill Hillman	B	Tennessee	
27	247	Boston Yanks	Odell Stautzenberger	G	Texas A&M	
27	248	Washington Redskins	Otis Sacrinty	B	Wake Forest	
27	249	Pittsburgh Steelers	Art Young	G	Dartmouth	
27	250	Green Bay Packers	Bob Palladino	B	Notre Dame	
27	251	Philadelphia Eagles	Phil Cutchin	B	Kentucky	
27	252	Chicago Cardinals	Dick Abrams	B	Washington State	
27	253	Los Angeles Rams	Bob David	G	Villanova	
27	254	New York Giants	George Bibighaus	E	Muhlenberg	
27	255	Chicago Bears	Bill Morris	E	Oklahoma	
28	256	Detroit Lions	Arch Kelly	E	Detroit	
28	257	Boston Yanks	Dick Chatterton	B	BYU	
28	258	Pittsburgh Steelers	Ralph Sazio	T	William & Mary	
28	259	Washington Redskins	Milt Dropo	C	Connecticut	
28	260	Chicago Cardinals	Joe Smith	E	Texas Tech	
28	261	Philadelphia Eagles	Charley Wakefield	T	Stanford	
28	262	Green Bay Packers	Jerrell Baxter	T	North Carolina	
28	263	Los Angeles Rams	Jim Hunnicutt	G	South Carolina	
28	264	New York Giants	Jim Carrington	G	Navy	
28	265	Chicago Bears	Joe Billy Baumgardner	HB	Texas	
29	266	Detroit Lions	Bob Tulis	T	Texas A&M	
29	267	Boston Yanks	Tom Rodgers	T	Bucknell	
29	268	Washington Redskins	Lynn Brownson	B	Stanford	
29	269	Pittsburgh Steelers	Dick Pitzer	E	Army	
29	270	Chicago Cardinals	Tony Rutunno	B	St. Ambrose	
29	271	Green Bay Packers	Ray Sellers	E	Georgia	
29	272	Philadelphia Eagles	Dick Langenbeck	T	Cincinnati	
29	273	Los Angeles Rams	John Comer	B	Holy Cross	
29	274	New York Giants	Claude Harrison	B	South Carolina	
29	275	Chicago Bears	Jerry McCarthy	E	Penn	
30	276	Detroit Lions	Howard McAfee	T	Tulane	
30	277	Boston Yanks	John Prchlik	DT	Yale	
30	278	Pittsburgh Steelers	Tony Stalloni	T	Delaware	
30	279	Washington Redskins	Joe Colone	B	Penn State	
30	280	Green Bay Packers	Jerry Carle	B	Northwestern	
30	281	Philadelphia Eagles	Bernie Winkler	T	Texas Tech	
30	282	Chicago Cardinals	Clyde Lindsley	E	LSU	
30	283	Los Angeles Rams	Hal Dean	G	Ohio State	
30	284	New York Giants	John Wright	B	Georgia	
30	285	Chicago Bears	Jack Pierce	B	Illinois	
31	286	Washington Redskins	Herb Shoener	E	Iowa	
31	287	Pittsburgh Steelers	Vince DiFrancesca	G	Northwestern	
31	288	Philadelphia Eagles	Bill Stephens	T	Baylor	
31	289	Chicago Cardinals	Bob Callahan	C	Michigan	
31	290	Green Bay Packers	Bill Hogan	B	Kansas	
31	291	Los Angeles Rams	James Atwell	B	South Carolina	
31	292	New York Giants	Bill Schuler	T	Yale	
31	293	Chicago Bears	Bulbs Ehlers	B	Purdue	
32	294	Pittsburgh Steelers	Warren Lahr ^{†}	DB	Case Western Reserve	
32	295	Washington Redskins	Bo Pievo	T	Purdue	
32	296	Chicago Cardinals	Johnny Karamigios	B	Denver	
32	297	Green Bay Packers	Ralph Olsen	DE	Utah	
32	298	Philadelphia Eagles	Mike Kalosh	E	La Crosse State	
32	299	Los Angeles Rams	Bob Prymuski	G	Illinois	
32	300	New York Giants	Don Clayton	B	North Carolina	

== Hall of Famers ==
- Dante Lavelli, end from Ohio State University taken 12th round 103rd overall by the Los Angeles Rams.

Inducted: Professional Football Hall of Fame class of 1975.

- Tom Landry, defensive back from Texas taken 20th round 184th overall by the New York Giants.

Inducted: For his Coaching achievements Professional Football Hall of Fame Class of 1990

- Art Donovan, defensive tackle from Boston College taken 22nd round 204th overall by the New York Giants

Inducted: Professional Football Hall of Fame class of 1968.

== Notable undrafted players ==
^{†}	= Pro Bowler

Original NFL team	Player	Pos.	College	Notes
Chicago Bears	Enrique Ecker	T	John Carroll	
Chicago Bears	George Gulyanics	HB/P	Alabama	
Detroit Lions	George Hekkers	T	Wisconsin	
Washington Redskins	Hugh Taylor ^{†}	WR	Oklahoma City	

== Summary ==
=== Schools with multiple draft selections ===
Selections	Schools
10	Texas
9	UCLA
8	Michigan, Northwestern
7	LSU, Oklahoma
6	Army, Illinois
5	Georgia, Indiana, North Carolina, Notre Dame, Ohio State, Penn, South Carolina, Tulsa, Wake Forest
4	California, Cincinnati, Detroit, Holy Cross, Iowa, Oklahoma A&M, Penn State, Stanford, TCU, Tennessee, Texas A&M, Texas Tech, USC, Vanderbilt, Washington, Washington State, Wisconsin
3	Arkansas, BYU, Duke, East Texas State, Miami (FL), Navy, NC State, Oklahoma City, Oregon, Rice, SMU, Yale
2	Boston College, Colgate, Colorado, Connecticut, Delaware, Denver, Georgia Tech, Hardin–Simmons, Kansas, Kentucky, Michigan State, Minnesota, Missouri, Muhlenberg, Nevada, Oregon State, Purdue, Richmond, Southeastern Louisiana, St. Bonaventure, Wesleyan, William & Mary, Wyoming
