= 1947 Washington Redskins season =

NFL team season

- Owner: George Preston Marshall
- General manager: Dick McCann
- Head coach: Turk Edwards
- Home stadium: Griffith Stadium

Results
- Record: 4–8
- Division place: 4th NFL Eastern
- Playoffs: Did not qualify

The 1947 Washington Redskins season was the franchise's 16th season in the National Football League (NFL) and their 10th in Washington, D.C. The team failed to improve on their 5–5–1 record from 1946 and finished 4–8. The 1947 Washington Redskins' 416 passing attempts (34.7 per game) are the most by an NFL team in the 1940s.

Although the NFL formally desegregated in 1946, many teams were slow to allow black athletes to compete even after the formal barrier had fallen. None were less willing to desegregate than the Washington Redskins, who sought to be the "home team" for a vast Southern market. The Redskins would remain the last bastion of racial segregation in the NFL, refusing to include a single black player on their roster until 1962.

== Before the season ==
=== NFL draft ===
1947 Washington Redskins draft
Round	Pick	Player	Position	College	Notes
1	4	Cal Rossi	B	UCLA	Also drafted in 1946
3	17	Gene (Red) Knight	B	LSU	
5	28	Hank Foldberg	E	Army	
6	39	Mike Garzoni	G	USC	
7	48	Bill Gray	G	Oregon State	
8	59	Hank Harris	G	Texas	
9	68	Roy Kurrasch	E	UCLA	played with New York Yankees (AAFC)
10	79	Ernie Williamson	T	North Carolina	
11	88	L. G. Carmody	B	Central Washington	
12	99	U.S. Savage	E	Richmond	
13	108	Bob Steckroth	E	William & Mary	
14	119	Weldon Edwards	T	TCU	
15	128	Earl Wheeler	C	Arkansas	
16	139	Bill Gold	B	Tennessee	
17	148	Jack Hart	T	Detroit	
18	159	Tom Nichols	B	Richmond	
19	168	Harry Dowda	DB	Wake Forest	
20	179	Charlie Webb	E	LSU	
21	188	Elmo Bond	T	Washington State	
22	199	Jim Hefti	B	St. Lawrence	
23	208	Tom Dudley	E	Virginia	
24	219	Bob Smith *	DB	Iowa	
25	228	Hal Mullins	T	Duke	
26	239	Francis Bocoka	E	Washington State	
27	248	Otis Sacrinty	B	Wake Forest	
28	259	Milt Dropo	C	Connecticut	
29	268	Lynn Brownson	B	Stanford	
30	279	Joe Colone	B	Penn State	
31	286	Herb Shoener	E	Iowa	
32	295	Bo Pievo	T	Purdue	
Made roster † Pro Football Hall of Fame * Made at least one Pro Bowl during career

== Preseason ==
Game	Date	Opponent	Result	Record	Venue	Attendance	Source
0	August 29	East–West Intra-Squad	W. 36, E. 35	—	Santa Ana, California		
1	September 5	at Los Angeles Rams	L 7–20	0–1	Los Angeles Memorial Coliseum	80,889	
2	September 10	vs. Detroit Lions	W 23–14	1–1	University of Denver Stadium (Denver, CO)	17,000	
3	September 17	at Chicago Bears	L 7–28	1–2	Soldier Field	54,723	
4	September 21	vs. Green Bay Packers	L 21–31	1–3	Municipal Stadium (Baltimore, MD)	18,186	

== Schedule ==
Game	Date	Opponent	Result	Record	Venue	Attendance	Recap	Source
1	September 28	at **Philadelphia Eagles**	**L** 42–45	0–1	Shibe Park	35,406	Recap	
2	October 5	**Pittsburgh Steelers**	**W** 27–26	1–1	Forbes Field	36,585	Recap	
3	October 12	**New York Giants**	**W** 28–20	2–1	Griffith Stadium	36,533	Recap	
4	October 19	at Green Bay Packers	**L** 10–27	2–2	Wisconsin State Fair Park	28,572	Recap	
5	October 26	Chicago Bears	**L** 20–56	2–3	Griffith Park	36,591	Recap	
6	November 2	**Philadelphia Eagles**	**L** 14–38	2–4	Griffith Park	36,591	Recap	
7	November 9	at **Pittsburgh Steelers**	**L** 14–21	2–5	Forbes Field	36,257	Recap	
8	November 16	at Detroit Lions	**L** 21–38	2–6	Briggs Stadium	17,003	Recap	
9	November 23	Chicago Cardinals	**W** 45–21	3–6	Griffith Stadium	35,362	Recap	
10	November 30	at **Boston Yanks**	**L** 24–27	3–7	Fenway Park	24,800	Recap	
11	December 7	at **New York Giants**	**L** 10–35	3–8	Polo Grounds	25,594	Recap	
12	December 14	**Boston Yanks**	**W** 40–13	4–8	Griffith Stadium	33,226	Recap	
Note: Intra-division opponents are in **bold** text.

== Standings ==
NFL Eastern Division
	W	L	T	PCT	DIV	PF	PA	STK
Philadelphia Eagles	8	4	0	.667	6–2	308	242	W1
Pittsburgh Steelers	8	4	0	.667	6–2	240	259	W1
Boston Yanks	4	7	1	.364	3–4–1	168	256	L2
Washington Redskins	4	8	0	.333	3–5	295	367	W1
New York Giants	2	8	2	.200	1–6–1	190	309	L1

Note: Tie games were not officially counted in the standings until 1972.

== Roster ==
1947 Washington Redskins final roster
Quarterbacks: 33 Sammy Baugh; 30 Jim Youel S; Backs: 26 Jim Castiglia FB; 14 Tom Farmer CB/RB; 61 Jim Hefti CB; 77 Tommy Mont CB/RB; 50 Bob Nussbaumer RB/CB; 25 Dick Poillon S/K/P/RB; 32 Sal Rosato FB; 99 Eddie Saenz RB/CB; 41 Dick Todd CB/RB; 29 George Wilde RB	Linemen/Linebackers: 42 John Adams T/MG; 55 Ki Aldrich OLB/C/G; 17 Don Avery DT/T; 51 Fred Boensch T/DT; 21 Don Deeks T/DT; 53 Al DeMao MG/C; 60 Bill Gray MLB/G; 36 Hank Harris DT/G; 38 Jack Jenkins OLB/FB; 58 Leo Nobile G; 19 Jim Peebles DT/T/E; 49 John Sanchez T/DT; 16 John Steber G/MG; 46 Jack Sommers MLB/C; 47 Ernie Williamson T	Ends/Receivers: 18 Joe Duckworth; 45 Paul McKee; 28 Hugh Taylor; 37 Joe Tereshinski; 22 Doug Turley; Reserve: 31 Clyde Ehrhardt C/LB (IR); 26 Ralph Ruthstrom FB/LB (Susp.); rookies in italics
