= 1947 Philadelphia Eagles season =

NFL sports season

- Head coach: Greasy Neale
- Home stadium: Shibe Park

Results
- Record: 8–4
- Division place: 1st NFL American
- Playoffs: Won Divisional Playoffs (at Steelers) 21–0; Lost NFL Championship (at Cardinals) 21–28

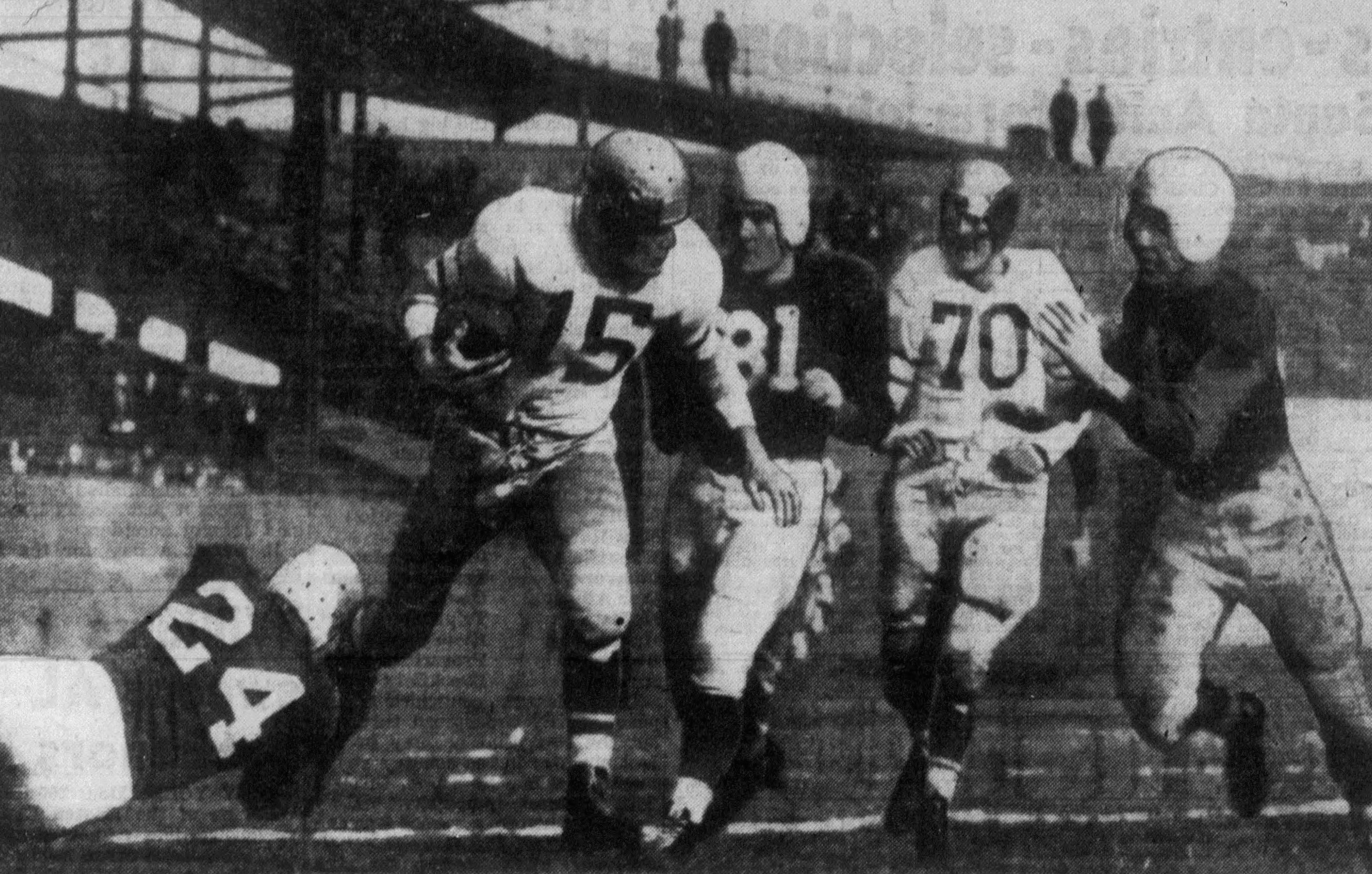
Philadelphia Eagles back Steve Van Buren (holding ball) makes a four yard gain as Chicago Cardinals back Red Cochran makes the tackle during the 1947 NFL Championship game on December 28, 1947 at Comiskey Park in Chicago, Illinois. Cardinals ends Joe Parker (number 81) and Walt Rankin (far right) and Eagles tackle Al Wistert (number 70) are also pictured.

The 1947 Philadelphia Eagles season was the Eagles' 15th in the league. The team improved on its previous output of 6–5, winning eight games.

The team qualified for the playoffs for the first time in fifteen seasons.

== Off season ==
For the second year in a row, the Eagles traveled to Saranac Lake High School Field/Eagles Residence, in Saranac Lake, New York to hold training camp. Greasy Neale liked having the Eagles train away from Philadelphia; the team only trained near its homebase when there were wartime travel restrictions during World War II.

Under Neale, the Eagles trained in Wisconsin, upstate New York and Minnesota when they could travel.

=== NFL draft ===
The 1947 NFL draft was held on December 16, 1946. The NFL started a lottery that allowed for a bonus pick for the first pick in the draft. The NFL continued this practice until 1958.

The Eagles made twenty-nine selections during the draft's thirty-two rounds, holding the sixth or seventh slots in the rounds in which they had picks.

The top two picks in the draft were derived from a lottery bonus pick as the number-one pick by the NFL champion Chicago Bears was Bob Fenimore, a back who attended Oklahoma A&M.

With the number-two pick, the Detroit Lions selected 1946 Heisman Trophy-winner Glenn Davis, a halfback from Army. He was unable to play, however, due to his required military service.

Cal Rossi, a running back from UCLA was drafted again in 1947 with the fourth pick by the Washington Redskins. He had been chosen in error with the ninth pick in the 1946 draft while he was still a junior in college. He declined to play pro football.

Future NFL Hall of Famers who were included in this draft where Dante Lavelli (12th round), Art Donovan (22nd round) and Tom Landry (20th round). Some of the players who were drafted were signed by All-America Football Conference teams.

=== Draft ===
This table shows the Eagles selections, what picks they had that were traded away, and the teams that ended up with those picks. It is possible that those Eagles' picks ended up with those teams via trades made by the Eagles with other teams. Not shown are acquired picks that the Eagles traded away.

1947 Philadelphia Eagles draft
Round	Pick	Player	Position	College	Notes
1	8	Neill Armstrong	E	Oklahoma A&M	
3	19	Bill Mackrides	QB	Nevada	
5	30	George Savitsky	T	Penn	Played with Eagles beginning in 1948
7	51	Tony Yovicsin	E	Miami (FL)	
8	61	Al Satterfield	T	Vanderbilt	
9	71	Bob Leonetti	G	Wake Forest	
10	80	Ulysses Cornogg	T	Wake Forest	
11	91	Alex Sarkisian	C	Northwestern	
12	102	Jerry D'Arcy	C	Tulsa	
13	110	John Hamberger	T	SMU	
14	121	Al Johnson	QB	Hardin–Simmons	Played with the Eagles in 1948
15	132	Joe Cook	B	Hardin–Simmons	
16	140	Jeff Durkota	FB	Penn State	
17	152	Hubert Shurtz	T	LSU	
18	161	Hal Bell	B	Muhlenberg	
19	170	T. J. Campion	T	Southeastern Louisiana	
20	182	Fred Hall	G	LSU	
21	191	Jim Clayton	T	Wyoming	
22	200	George Blomquist	E	NC State	
23	212	Joe Haynes	C	Tulsa	Played with the Buffalo Bills (AAFC)
24	221	Stanton Hense	E	Xavier	
25	230	Johnny Kelly	B	Rice	
26	242	H. J. Roberts	G	Rice	
27	251	Phil Cutchin	B	Kentucky	
28	261	Charley Wakefield	T	Stanford	
29	272	Dick Langenbeck	T	Cincinnati	
30	281	Bernie Winkler	T	Texas Tech	
31	288	Bill Stephens	T	Baylor	
32	298	Mike Kalosh	E	La Crosse State	
Made roster * Made at least one Pro Bowl during career

== Schedule ==
Game	Date	Opponent	Result	Record	Venue	Attendance	Recap	Sources
1	September 28	**Washington Redskins**	**W** 45–42	1–0	Shibe Park	35,406	Recap	
2	October 5	**New York Giants**	**W** 23–0	2–0	Shibe Park	29,823	Recap	
3	October 12	at Chicago Bears	**L** 7–40	2–1	Wrigley Field	34,338	Recap	
4	October 19	at **Pittsburgh Steelers**	**L** 24–35	2–2	Forbes Field	33,538	Recap	
5	October 26	Los Angeles Rams	**W** 14–7	3–2	Shibe Park	36,364	Recap	
6	November 2	at **Washington Redskins**	**W** 38–14	4–2	Griffith Stadium	36,591	Recap	
7	November 9	at **New York Giants**	**W** 41–24	5–2	Polo Grounds	29,016	Recap	
8	November 16	**Boston Yanks**	**W** 32–0	6–2	Shibe Park	26,498	Recap	
9	November 23	at **Boston Yanks**	**L** 14–21	6–3	Fenway Park	15,628	Recap	
10	November 30	**Pittsburgh Steelers**	**W** 21–0	7–3	Shibe Park	37,218	Recap	
11	December 7	Chicago Cardinals	**L** 21–45	7–4	Shibe Park	32,322	Recap	
12	December 14	Green Bay Packers	**W** 28–14	8–4	Shibe Park	24,216	Recap	
Note: Intra-division opponents are in **bold** text.

== Playoffs ==
Round	Date	Opponent	Result	Venue	Attendance	Recap	Sources
Divisional	December 21	at Pittsburgh Steelers	W 21–0	Forbes Field	35,729	Recap	
Championship	December 28	at Chicago Cardinals	L 21–28	Comiskey Park	30,759	Recap	

== Roster ==
(All time List of Philadelphia Eagles players in franchise history)

= 1947 Pro All-Star
- + = 1st team All-Star

NO.	Player	AGE	POS	GP	GS	WT	HT	YRS	College
	Greasy Neale	56	Coach	_{1947 record} 8–4–0	_{NFL-Eagles; Lifetime} 37–34–4			7th	West Virginia Wesleyan
	Neill Armstrong	21	E-DB	12	1	189	6–2	Rookie	Oklahoma State
	Al Baisi	30	G	2	0	217	6–0	7	West Virginia
	Alf Bauman	27	DT-T	2	0	228	6–2	Rookie	Northwestern
	Larry Cabrelli	30	E-DB	6	0	194	5–11	6	Colgate
	T.J. Campion	29	T	5	0	235	6–2	Rookie	Southeastern Louisiana
	Russ Craft	26	DB-HB	10	4	178	5–9	1	Alabama
	Noble Doss	27	HB	9	0	186	6–0	Rookie	Texas
	Otis Douglas	36	T	12	3	224	6–1	1	William & Mary
	Jack Ferrante	31	E-DE	11	6	197	6–1	6	none
	John Green	26	DE-E	12	1	192	6–1	Rookie	Tulsa
	Roger Harding	24	C-LB	6	0	217	6–2	2	California
	Jack Hinkle	30	B	3	0	195	6–0	7	Syracuse
	Dick Humbert	29	E-DE	11	1	179	6–1	5	Richmond
	Jim Kekeris	24	T	10	2	257	6–1	Rookie	Missouri
	Bucko Kilroy	26	G-MG-T-DT	12	9	243	6–2	4	_{Notre Dame, and Temple}
	Ben Kish	30	B	12	8	207	6–0	7	Pittsburgh
	Pete Kmetovic	27	HB	5	0	175	5–9	Rookie	Stanford
	Bob Krieger	28	E	7	2	190	6–1	5	Dartmouth
	Bert Kuczynski	26	E	3	0	196	6–0	3	Pennsylvania
	Vic Lindskog	33	C	10	1	203	6–1	3	Stanford
	Jay MacDowell	28	T-DE	12	3	217	6–2	1	Washington
	Art Macioszczyk	27	FB	11	2	208	6–0	3	Western Michigan
	Bill Mackrides	22	QB	8	0	182	5–11	Rookie	Nevada-Reno
	Duke Maronic	26	G	4	0	209	5–9	3	none
	Pat McHugh	28	DB-HB	9	1	166	5–11	Rookie	Georgia Tech
	Joe Muha	26	FB-LB	12	12	205	6–1	1	Virginia Military Institute
	Cliff Patton	24	G-LB	12	12	243	6–2	1	TCU
	Pete Pihos	24	E-DE	12	12	210	6–1	Rookie	Indiana
	Hal Prescott	27	E	11	2	199	6–1	1	Hardin–Simmons
	Bosh Pritchard	28	HB	11	5	164	5–11	5	_{Georgia Tech, and VMI}
	Vic Sears	29	T-DT	7	5	223	6–3	6	Oregon State
	Allie Sherman	24	QB	11	0	170	5–11	4	Brooklyn
	Ernie Steele	30	HB-DB	12	5	187	6–0	5	Washington
	Gil Steinke	28	HB	6	3	175	6–0	2	Texas A&M-Kingsville
	Dan Talcott	26	T	8	0	235	6–3	Rookie	UNLV
	Tommy Thompson	31	QB	12	1	192	6–1	7	Tulsa
	Steve Van Buren+	27	HB	12	7	200	6–0	3	LSU
	Don Weedon	28	G	12	0	220	5–11	Rookie	Texas
	Boyd Williams	25	C	6	0	218	6–3	Rookie	Syracuse
	Al Wistert+	27	T-G-DT	12	12	214	6–1	4	Michigan
	Alex Wojciechowicz	32	C-LB-E	12	11	217	5–11	9	Fordham
	John Wyhonic	28	G	12	2	213	6–0	1	Alabama
	41 Players; Team Average	27.6		11		205	6–0.5	2,7	

- Link to all time List of Philadelphia Eagles players in franchise history

== Standings ==
NFL Eastern Division
	W	L	T	PCT	DIV	PF	PA	STK
Philadelphia Eagles	8	4	0	.667	6–2	308	242	W1
Pittsburgh Steelers	8	4	0	.667	6–2	240	259	W1
Boston Yanks	4	7	1	.364	3–4–1	168	256	L2
Washington Redskins	4	8	0	.333	3–5	295	367	W1
New York Giants	2	8	2	.200	1–6–1	190	309	L1

Note: Tie games were not officially counted in the standings until 1972.
