= 1947 Chicago Bears season =

NFL team season

- Owner: George Halas
- Head coach: George Halas
- Home stadium: Wrigley Field

Results
- Record: 8–4
- Division place: 2nd NFL Western
- Playoffs: Did not qualify

The 1947 season was the Chicago Bears' 28th in the National Football League. The team failed to improve on their 8–2–1 record from 1946 and finished with an 8–4 record, under head coach George Halas, but the team finished second in the NFL Western Division behind their inner-city rivals the Chicago Cardinals missing out on an NFL title game appearance.

== Before the season ==
=== Draft ===
1947 Chicago Bears draft
Round	Pick	Player	Position	College	Notes
1	1	Bob Fenimore	HB	Oklahoma A&M	Special Lottery Pick
1	11	Don Kindt	DB	Wisconsin	
3	23	Frank Minini *	HB	San Jose State	
5	32	Lloyd Merriman	B	Stanford	
5	35	Jim Canady	B	Arkansas A&M	Played with Bears in 1948
6	42	Roger Stephens	B	Cincinnati	
6	45	Harlan Wetz	T	Texas	Signed with the Brooklyn Dodgers (AAFC)
7	55	Reid Moseley	E	Georgia	
8	65	Allen Smith	E	Ole Miss	
9	75	Dwight Eddleman	B	Illinois	
10	85	Arnold Tucker	B	Army	
11	95	Larry Hatch	B	Washington	
12	105	Tony Adamle *	LB	Ohio State	Signed with the Cleveland Browns (AAFC)
13	115	Emile Fritz	G	Maryland	
14	125	Jim Turner	T	California	
15	135	Wayne Goodall	E	Oklahoma City	
16	145	Verne Gagne	E	Minnesota	
17	155	Wally Dreyer	DB	Michigan	Played with the Bears in 1949
18	165	Walt Pupa	B	North Carolina	
19	175	John McLellan	T	Montana State	
20	185	Bill Cromer	B	Texas	
21	195	Russ Reader	DB	Michigan State	
22	205	Jim Batchelor	B	East Texas State	
23	215	Al Lawler	HB	Texas	Played for Bears in 1948
24	225	Gordon Berlin	C	Washington	
25	235	John Cunningham	E	California	
26	245	Max Morris	E	Northwestern	Signed with the Chicago Rockets (AAFC)
27	255	Bill Morris	E	Oklahoma	
28	265	Joe Bill Baumgardner	HB	Texas	
29	275	Jerry McCarthy	E	Penn	
30	285	Jack Pierce	B	Illinois	
31	293	Ed Ehlers	B	Purdue	
Made roster * Made at least one Pro Bowl during career

== Schedule ==
Game	Date	Opponent	Result	Record	Venue	Recap	Sources
1	September 28	at **Green Bay Packers**	**L** 20–29	0–1	City Stadium	Recap	
2	October 5	at **Chicago Cardinals**	**L** 7–31	0–2	Comiskey Park	Recap	
3	October 12	Philadelphia Eagles	**W** 40–7	1–2	Wrigley Field	Recap	
4	October 19	**Detroit Lions**	**W** 33–24	2–2	Wrigley Field	Recap	
5	October 26	at Washington Redskins	**W** 56–20	3–2	Griffith Stadium	Recap	
6	November 2	at Boston Yanks	**W** 28–24	4–2	Fenway Park	Recap	
7	November 9	**Green Bay Packers**	**W** 20–17	5–2	Wrigley Field	Recap	
8	November 16	at **Los Angeles Rams**	**W** 41–21	6–2	L.A. Memorial Coliseum	Recap	
9	November 23	Pittsburgh Steelers	**W** 49–7	7–2	Wrigley Field	Recap	
10	November 27	at **Detroit Lions**	**W** 34–14	8–2	Briggs Stadium	Recap	
11	December 7	**Los Angeles Rams**	**L** 14–17	8–3	Wrigley Field	Recap	
12	December 14	**Chicago Cardinals**	**L** 21–30	8–4	Wrigley Field	Recap	
Note: Intra-division opponents are in **bold** text.

== Roster ==
Chicago Bears 1947 final roster
Quarterbacks: 42 Sid Luckman; 4 Nick Sacrinty S; Ends/Receivers: 14 Ed Cifers; 25 Mike Jarmoluk; 51 Ken Kavanaugh; 20 Jim Keane; 32 Allen Smith; 7 Ed Sprinkle	Linemen/Linebackers: 82 Ray Bray MG/G; 31 Stu Clarkson C/LB; 24 Fred Davis T/DT; 21 Chuck Drulis MG/G; 22 Ed Ecker DT/T; 13 Thurman Garrett G; 35 Fred Hartman T/DT; 15 Mike Holovak LB/FB; 33 Bill Johnson G; 29 Ed Kolman DT/T; 38 Bill Milner G/LB; 18 Joe Osmanski LB/FB; 53 Pat Preston G/MG; 45 Walt Stickel T/DT; 66 Bulldog Turner LB/C	Backs: 36 Tom Farris; 55 Bob Fenimore; 8 Hugh Gallarneau; 39 George Gulyanics P; 6 Don Kindt; 5 George McAfee; 57 Ray McLean K; 44 Frank Minini LB; 10 Noah Mullins; 9 Bill Osmanski; 11 Russ Reader; Rookies in italics

== Standings ==
Program for the December 14 season finale with the crosstown rival Chicago Cards. The Cardinals won the game and with it, the division title.

NFL Western Division
	W	L	T	PCT	DIV	PF	PA	STK
Chicago Cardinals	9	3	0	.750	7–1	306	231	W2
Chicago Bears	8	4	0	.667	4–4	363	241	L2
Green Bay Packers	6	5	1	.545	5–3	274	210	L1
Los Angeles Rams	6	6	0	.500	4–4	259	214	W2
Detroit Lions	3	9	0	.250	0–8	231	305	L3

Note: Tie games were not officially counted in the standings until 1972.
