= 1947 Detroit Lions season =

NFL team season

- Head coach: Gus Dorais

Results
- Record: 3–9
- Division place: 5th NFL Western
- Playoffs: Did not qualify

The 1947 Detroit Lions season was their 18th in the league. The team improved on their previous season's output of 1–10, winning three games. They failed to qualify for the playoffs for the 12th consecutive season.

== Before the season ==
=== Draft ===
1947 Detroit Lions draft
Round	Pick	Player	Position	College	Notes
1	2	Glenn Davis *	HB	Army	1946 Heisman Trophy winner
2	12	Russ Thomas	T	Ohio State	
3	14	Jim Kekeris	T	Missouri	
4	24	Charley Hoover	C	Vanderbilt	
5	26	Bob Chappuis	TB	Michigan	Remained in college
6	36	Bernie Gallagher	G	Penn	Signed with Los Angeles Dons (AAFC)
7	46	Ed Grain	G	Penn	Joined the AAFC
8	56	Harvey James	C	Miami (FL)	
9	66	Kale Alexander	T	South Carolina	Remained in college
10	76	Bump Elliott	B	Michigan	Remained in college
11	86	Pete Sullivan	T	Detroit	
12	96	LaVerne Camarata	B	Iowa State	
13	106	Walt Vezmar	G	Michigan State	
14	116	Dick Hagen	E	Washington	
15	126	J.W. Meeks	B	East Texas State	
16	136	Reed Nilsen	C	BYU	
17	146	Tommy James *	DB	Ohio State	
18	156	Ralph Maugham	E	Utah State	
19	166	Buryl Baty	B	Texas A&M	
20	176	Elmer Madar	E	Michigan	Signed with the Baltimore Colts (AAFC)
21	186	J. T. White	E	Michigan	
22	196	Carl Schuette	LB	Marquette	
23	206	Steve Cipot	T	St. Bonaventure	
24	216	Bill Cadenhead	B	Alabama	
25	226	Jim Cody	T	East Texas State	
26	236	Earl Maves	WB	Wisconsin	Played for Lions in 1948
27	246	Bill Hillman	B	Tennessee	
28	256	Arch Kelly	E	Detroit	
29	266	Bob Tulis	T	Texas A&M	
30	276	Howard McAfee	T	Tulane	
Made roster * Made at least one Pro Bowl during career

== Schedule ==
Week	Date	Opponent	Result	Record	Venue	Game recap
1	September 21	at Pittsburgh Steelers	**L** 10–17	0–1	Forbes Field	Recap
2	September 28	at **Chicago Cardinals**	**L** 21–45	0–2	Comiskey Park	Recap
3	October 5	at Boston Yanks	**W** 21–7	1–2	Fenway Park	Recap
4	October 12	**Los Angeles Rams**	**L** 13–27	1–3	Briggs Stadium	Recap
5	October 19	at **Chicago Bears**	**L** 24–33	1–4	Wrigley Field	Recap
6	October 26	at **Green Bay Packers**	**L** 17–34	1–5	City Stadium	Recap
7	November 2	New York Giants	**W** 35–7	2–5	Briggs Stadium	Recap
8	November 9	**Chicago Cardinals**	**L** 7–17	2–6	Briggs Stadium	Recap
9	November 16	Washington Redskins	**W** 38–21	3–6	Briggs Stadium	Recap
10	November 23	at **Los Angeles Rams**	**L** 17–28	3–7	Los Angeles Memorial Coliseum	Recap
11	November 27	**Chicago Bears**	**L** 14–34	3–8	Briggs Stadium	Recap
12	December 7	**Green Bay Packers**	**L** 14–35	3–9	Briggs Stadium	Recap
13	Bye					
Note: Intra-division opponents are in **bold** text.

== Standings ==
NFL Western Division
	W	L	T	PCT	DIV	PF	PA	STK
Chicago Cardinals	9	3	0	.750	7–1	306	231	W2
Chicago Bears	8	4	0	.667	4–4	363	241	L2
Green Bay Packers	6	5	1	.545	5–3	274	210	L1
Los Angeles Rams	6	6	0	.500	4–4	259	214	W2
Detroit Lions	3	9	0	.250	0–8	231	305	L3

Note: Tie games were not officially counted in the standings until 1972.

== Roster ==
1947 Detroit Lions roster
Quarterbacks: 6 Roy Zimmerman K/P; Running backs: 35 Bill Dudley CB; 45 Pete Kmetovic; 40 Elmer Madarik CB; 81 Joe Margucci QB; 62 Bill O'Brien; 33 Steve Sucic LB; 86 Bob Westfall LB; 66 Camp Wilson; Receivers: 21 Ted Cremer; 10 John Greene DE; 31 Ralph Heywood	Linemen/Linebackers: 65 Stan Batinski G/MG; 44 Ben Chase T/DT; 17 Chuck DeShane G/LB; 50 Jack Dugger DT/T; 34 George Hekkers T/DT; 73 Elmer Jones G/MG; 51 Les Lear MG/G; 78 Kelley Mote DE/WR; 46 Reed Nilsen C/LB; 82 Mitchell Olenski T/DT; 67 Merv Pregulman LB/C; 55 Cecil Souders DE/WR; 52 Ed Stacco T/DT; 12 Dick Stovall LB; 83 Frank Szymanski C/LB; 71 Russ Thomas T/DT; 42 Bill Ward LB/G	Defensive backs: 20 Ted Cook CB/WR; 39 Bob DeFruiter S; 11 Clyde LeForce S/QB; 15 Joe Watt CB/RB/S; 75 Bob Wiese S/FB; Reserve lists: 42 Bob Ivory G/MG (IR); 22 Tommy James RB/CB (IR); -- Howard McAfee T (IR); rookies in italics
