= 1947 Green Bay Packers season =

NFL team season

- Head coach: Curly Lambeau
- Home stadium: City Stadium; Wisconsin State Fair Park

Results
- Record: 6–5–1
- Division place: 3rd NFL Western
- Playoffs: Did not qualify

The 1947 Green Bay Packers season was their 29th season overall and their 27th season in the National Football League. The team finished with a 6–5–1 record under coach Curly Lambeau, earning a third-place finish in the Western Conference.

== Offseason ==
=== Draft ===
1947 Green Bay Packers draft
Round	Pick	Player	Position	College	Notes
1	6	Ernie Case	QB	UCLA	Signed with Baltimore Colts (AAFC)
3	20	Burr Baldwin	E	UCLA	Signed with Los Angeles Dons (AAFC)
5	31	Buddy Burris	G	Oklahoma	Returned to college
6	40	Gene Wilson	E	SMU	
7	52	Dick Connors	B	Northwestern	
8	62	Monte Moncrief	T	Texas A&M	
9	72	Bob McDougal	FB	Miami (FL)	
10	81	Bob Kelly	HB	Navy	Signed with Los Angeles Dons (AAFC)
11	92	Tom Moulton	C	Oklahoma A&M	
12	100	George Hills	G	Georgia Tech	
13	111	Bob Skoglund	DE	Notre Dame	
14	122	Jack Mitchell	B	Oklahoma	Returned to college
15	130	Denny Crawford	G	Tennessee	
16	141	Jim Callanan	E	USC	
17	151	Ted Scalissi	HB	Ripon	
18	160	Jim Goodman	T	Indiana	
19	172	Dick Miller	G	Lawrence	
20	181	Brad Ecklund *	C	Oregon	
21	190	Bob West	B	Colorado	
22	202	Maurice "Tex" Reilly	B	Colorado	
23	211	Ron Sockolov	T	California	
24	220	Herbert St. John	G	Georgia	Returned to college
25	232	Fred Redeker	B	Cincinnati	
26	241	Herm Lubker	E	Arkansas	
27	250	Bob Palladino	B	Notre Dame	
28	262	Jerrell Baxter	T	North Carolina	
29	271	Ray Sellers	E	Georgia	
30	280	Jerry Carle	B	Northwestern	Returned to college
31	290	Bill Hogan	B	Kansas	
32	297	Ralph Olsen	DE	Utah	Played with Packers in 1949
Made roster * Made at least one Pro Bowl during career

== Regular season ==
=== Schedule ===
Week	Date	Opponent	Result	Record	Venue	Game recap
1	Bye					
2	September 28	**Chicago Bears**	**W** 29–20	1–0	City Stadium	Recap
3	October 5	**Los Angeles Rams**	**W** 17–14	2–0	Wisconsin State Fair Park	Recap
4	October 12	**Chicago Cardinals**	**L** 10–14	2–1	City Stadium	Recap
5	October 19	Washington Redskins	**W** 27–10	3–1	Wisconsin State Fair Park	Recap
6	October 26	**Detroit Lions**	**W** 34–17	4–1	City Stadium	Recap
7	November 2	Pittsburgh Steelers	**L** 17–18	4–2	Wisconsin State Fair Park	Recap
8	November 9	at **Chicago Bears**	**L** 17–20	4–3	Wrigley Field	Recap
9	November 16	at **Chicago Cardinals**	**L** 20–21	4–4	Comiskey Park	Recap
10	November 23	at New York Giants	**T** 24–24	4–4–1	Polo Grounds	Recap
11	November 30	at **Los Angeles Rams**	**W** 30–10	5–4–1	Los Angeles Memorial Coliseum	Recap
12	December 7	at **Detroit Lions**	**W** 35–14	6–4–1	Briggs Stadium	Recap
13	December 14	at Philadelphia Eagles	**L** 14–28	6–5–1	Shibe Park	Recap
Note: Intra-division opponents are in **bold** text.

== Standings ==
NFL Western Division
	W	L	T	PCT	DIV	PF	PA	STK
Chicago Cardinals	9	3	0	.750	7–1	306	231	W2
Chicago Bears	8	4	0	.667	4–4	363	241	L2
Green Bay Packers	6	5	1	.545	5–3	274	210	L1
Los Angeles Rams	6	6	0	.500	4–4	259	214	W2
Detroit Lions	3	9	0	.250	0–8	231	305	L3

Note: Tie games were not officially counted in the standings until 1972.

== Roster ==
1947 Green Bay Packers final roster
Backs: 3 Tony Canadeo RB/S; 17 Ed Cody FB; 51 Irv Comp S/RB; 8 Bob Forte CB/RB; 64 Ted Fritsch FB/LB/K; 16 Jim Gillette RB/CB; 27 Jack Jacobs QB/CB/P; 22 Roy McKay CB/RB/P; 80 Herm Rohrig S/RB; 7 Walt Schlinkman FB; 42 Bruce Smith RB	Linemen/Linebackers: 82 Ed Bell G/T/MG/DT; 29 Charley Brock C/LB; 46 Ray Clemons G; 54 Larry Craig DE/WR; 75 Tiny Croft T/DT; 66 Ralph Davis G; 35 Bob Flowers LB; 40 Aldo Forte G; 33 Lester Gatewood C; 18 Ken Keuper LB/FB; 47 Paul Lipscomb T/DT; 58 Ed Neal MG; 63 Urban Odson T/DT; 44 Baby Ray T/DT; 15 Damon Tassos G/MG; 43 Don Wells DE; 45 Dick Wildung G	Receivers: 23 Clyde Goodnight; 38 Nolan Luhn; 52 Bob Skoglund DE; 65 Gene Wilson CB; Special teams: 21 Ward Cuff K; Rookies in italics
