= Weldon Edwards =

Weldon Edwards may refer to:

- Weldon Edwards (American football) (1924–1988), American football offensive tackle
- Weldon Nathaniel Edwards (1788–1873), American politician from North Carolina
- Weldon W. Edwards, American politician from Mississippi
