= 1947 Chicago Cardinals season =

American football team season

- Head coach: Jimmy Conzelman
- Home stadium: Comiskey Park

Results
- Record: 9–3
- Division place: 1st NFL Western
- Playoffs: Won NFL Championship (vs. Eagles) 28–21

The 1947 Chicago Cardinals season was the franchise's 28th season in the National Football League. The Cardinals won the second NFL championship in team history against the Philadelphia Eagles. The team was led by its "Million Dollar Backfield" of Elmer Angsman, Charley Trippi, Paul Christman, and Pat Harder. It was quite a turnaround for a franchise who was riding a 19-game losing streak just two years earlier.

The Cards would win the Western Division again in 1948 but lose the Championship Game to the Eagles; it would be another 26 years until the now St. Louis Cardinals would win another division title. Also, it would be over half a century (and two franchise shifts) until the Cardinals would win another playoff game, in 1998; an NFL-record 51 years. As of the end of 2025, this remains the team's last NFL title, the longest active "championship drought" in American professional sports.

The last remaining active member of the 1947 Chicago Cardinals was Charley Trippi, who retired after the 1955 season.

== Pre-season ==
=== Draft ===
1947 Chicago Cardinals draft
| Round | Pick | Player | Position | College | Notes |
| 1 | 7 | Tex Coulter * | T | Army | A member of the New York Giants |
| 3 | 18 | Ermal Allen | QB | Kentucky | Played with the Cleveland Browns (AAFC) |
| 6 | 41 | Ben Raimondi | HB | Indiana | Played with the New York Yankees (AAFC) |
| 7 | 50 | Howard Turner | B | NC State | |
| 8 | 60 | George Maddock | T | Northwestern | |
| 9 | 70 | Art Dufelmeier | B | Illinois | Returned to Illinois |
| 10 | 82 | Ray Ramsey | B | Bradley | |
| 11 | 90 | Dave Wallace | B | Oklahoma | |
| 12 | 101 | Charley Sarratt | QB | Oklahoma | |
| 13 | 112 | Harden Cooper | T | Tulsa | |
| 14 | 120 | Carl Russ | BB | Rice | |
| 15 | 131 | Buddy Mulligan | B | Duke | |
| 16 | 142 | Charles Smith | HB | Georgia | |
| 17 | 150 | Bob Ravensberg | E | Indiana | Played with the Cardinals in 1948–49 |
| 18 | 162 | Barney Barnett | E | Northeastern State | |
| 19 | 171 | Scotty Deeds | B | BYU | |
| 20 | 180 | Clarence Esser | E | Wisconsin | |
| 21 | 192 | Shelton Ballard | C | LSU | |
| 22 | 201 | Wade Walker | T | Oklahoma | Returned to Oklahoma |
| 23 | 210 | Tom Carroll | T | Minnesota | |
| 24 | 222 | Tom Dorsey | B | Brown | |
| 25 | 231 | Otto Schnellbacher * | DB | Kansas | |
| 26 | 240 | Larry Joe | B | Penn State | |
| 27 | 252 | Dick Abrams | B | Washington State | |
| 28 | 260 | Joe Smith | E | Texas Tech | |
| 29 | 270 | Tony Rutunno | B | St. Ambrose | |
| 30 | 282 | Clyde Lindsley | E | LSU | |
| 31 | 289 | Bob Callahan | C | Michigan | |
| 32 | 296 | Johnny Karamigios | B | Denver | |
Made roster * Made at least one Pro Bowl during career

== Regular season ==
=== Schedule ===
| Game | Date | Opponent | Result | Record | Venue | Attendance | Recap | Sources |
|---|---|---|---|---|---|---|---|---|
| 1 | September 28 | **Detroit Lions** | **W** 45–21 | 1–0 | Comiskey Park | 22,245 | Recap | |
| 2 | October 5 | **Chicago Bears** | **W** 31–7 | 2–0 | Comiskey Park | 51,123 | Recap | |
| 3 | October 12 | at **Green Bay Packers** | **W** 14–10 | 3–0 | City Stadium | 25,562 | Recap | |
| 4 | October 19 | at **Los Angeles Rams** | **L** 7–27 | 3–1 | L.A. Memorial Coliseum | 69,631 | Recap | |
| 5 | October 26 | Boston Yanks | **W** 27–7 | 4–1 | Comiskey Park | 22,286 | Recap | |
| 6 | November 2 | **Los Angeles Rams** | **W** 17–10 | 5–1 | Comiskey Park | 40,075 | Recap | |
| 7 | November 9 | at **Detroit Lions** | **W** 17–7 | 6–1 | Briggs Stadium | 25,296 | Recap | |
| 8 | November 16 | **Green Bay Packers** | **W** 21–20 | 7–1 | Comiskey Park | 40,086 | Recap | |
| 9 | November 23 | at Washington Redskins | **L** 21–45 | 7–2 | Griffith Stadium | 35,362 | Recap | |
| 10 | November 30 | at New York Giants | **L** 31–35 | 7–3 | Polo Grounds | 28,744 | Recap | |
| 11 | December 7 | at Philadelphia Eagles | **W** 45–21 | 8–3 | Shibe Park | 32,322 | Recap | |
| 12 | December 14 | at **Chicago Bears** | **W** 30–21 | 9–3 | Wrigley Field | 48,632 | Recap | |
Note: Intra-division opponents are in **bold** text.

== Standings ==
NFL Western Division
| | W | L | T | PCT | DIV | PF | PA | STK |
|---|---|---|---|---|---|---|---|---|
| Chicago Cardinals | 9 | 3 | 0 | .750 | 7–1 | 306 | 231 | W2 |
| Chicago Bears | 8 | 4 | 0 | .667 | 4–4 | 363 | 241 | L2 |
| Green Bay Packers | 6 | 5 | 1 | .545 | 5–3 | 274 | 210 | L1 |
| Los Angeles Rams | 6 | 6 | 0 | .500 | 4–4 | 259 | 214 | W2 |
| Detroit Lions | 3 | 9 | 0 | .250 | 0–8 | 231 | 305 | L3 |

Note: Tie games were not officially counted in the standings until 1972.

== Post-season ==
=== Playoffs ===
| Round | Date | Opponent | Result | Venue | Attendance | Recap | Sources |
|---|---|---|---|---|---|---|---|
| Championship | December 28 | Philadelphia Eagles | W 28–21 | Comiskey Park | 30,759 | Recap | |

=== NFL Championship Game ===
The 1947 NFL Championship Game was the 15th annual championship game and was held December 28, 1947, at Comiskey Park in Chicago. The game featured the Western Division champion Chicago Cardinals (9–3) and the Eastern Division champion Philadelphia Eagles (8–4). The Cardinals won the game by a score of 28–21.

== Personnel ==
=== Staff / Coaches ===
1947 Chicago Cardinals staff
| Front office: Principal / Majority Owner – Violet Bidwill Wolfner; General Manager – Ray Bennigsen; Coaching staff: Head Coach – Jimmy Conzelman; Assistant Coaches: Assistant Coach - Buddy Parker; Assistant Coach - Dick Plasman; Assistant / Line Coach - Phil Handler | Special Teams Coaches: None - N/A |

=== Roster ===
1947 Chicago Cardinals final roster
| Quarterbacks: 44 Paul Christman; 22 Ray Mallouf P/S; Running backs: 7 Elmer Angsman FB; 39 Bill DeCorrevont RB/CB; 87 Babe Dimancheff RB/CB; 37 Vic Schwall RB; 62 Charley Trippi RB/S; Receivers: 41 Billy Dewell; 66 Jack Doolan; 80 Malcolm Kutner S; 16 Dick Plasman DE | Linemen: 68 Plato Andros G/MG; 75 Ray Apolskis G/MG; 76 Lloyd Arms G/MG; 11 Chet Bulger T/DT; 53 Bill Campbell C; 55 Jake Colhouer G/MG; 50 Joe Coomer DT/T; 67 Clarence Esser DE; 51 Pop Ivy DE/WR; 82 Caleb Martin T/DT; 77 Stan Mauldin T/DT; 81 Joe Parker DE; 36 Walt Szot T/DT; 15 Bob Zimny DT/T | Linebackers: 32 Vince Banonis LB/C; 57 Bill Blackburn LB/C; 73 Hamilton Nichols LB/FB; 20 Buster Ramsey LB/G; 42 Walt Rankin LB/FB; Defensive Backs: 99 Marshall Goldberg CB/RB; 24 Red Cochran S/RB; 19 Charles Smith CB/RB; Special Teams: 34 Pat Harder FB/K; rookies in italics |

== Awards and records ==
- Pat Harder, NFL scoring leader: 102 points
- Pat Harder, NFL record, most field goals in one game: 7
