= Shurtz =

Shurtz is a surname. Notable people with the surname include:

- Hubert Shurtz (1923–2000), American football player
- Sewall Shurtz (1933–2018), American fencer
