= Vezmar =

Vezmar is a surname. Notable people with the surname include:

- Nataša Vezmar (born 1976), Croatian taekwondo practitioner
- Walter Vezmar (1925–1981), American football player
- Dave Vezmar (born 1973), Known for running the Boston marathon barefoot in 2023
