= Chuck Elliott =

American football player (1921–1980)

- Chuck Elliott, 1941

No. 45, 47, 46
- Position: Tackle

Personal information
- Born: December 30, 1921; Corvallis, Oregon, U.S.
- Died: September 16, 1980 (aged 58); Oregon City, Oregon, U.S.
- Listed height: 6 ft 2 in (1.88 m)
- Listed weight: 240 lb (109 kg)

Career information
- High school: Eugene (OR)
- College: Oregon (1940-1942, 1946)
- NFL draft: 1947: 22nd round, 203rd overall pick

Career history
- New York Yankees (1947); Chicago Rockets (1948); San Francisco 49ers (1948)

Career AAFC statistics
- Games played: 14
- Stats at Pro Football Reference

Charles Junior Elliott (December 30, 1921 – September 16, 1980) was an American football tackle. He played college football for Oregon and professional football for the New York Yankees, Chicago Rockets, and San Francisco 49ers.

== Early life ==
Elliott was born in 1921 in Corvallis, Oregon, he attended Corvallis High School where he was a star athlete in both track and football. He set an Oregon high school record in the shot put.

== College football ==
Elliott attended the University of Oregon, where he was a member for the college football and track teams.

In August 1943, Elliott entered in the U.S. Army Air Forces during World War II. He was sent overseas in mid-June 1944 and was wounded later that year while serving in the European Theater. He was hospitalized in Belgium after his injury.

== Professional football ==
Elliott was selected by the Los Angeles Rams in the 22nd round (203rd overall pick) of the 1947 NFL draft. He opted instead to play in the All-America Football Conference (AAFC) for the New York Yankees in 1947 and for the Chicago Rockets and San Francisco 49ers in 1949.

== Later life ==
After retiring as a player, Elliott was hired in 1949 as the football coach at Oregon City High School. David died in 1980 at age 58 in Oregon City, Oregon.
