= Clarence Esser =

American football player (1921–2009)

No. 67
- Position: End

Personal information
- Born: May 13, 1925; Madison, Wisconsin, U.S.
- Died: June 1, 2009 (aged 84); Orlando, Florida, U.S.
- Listed height: 6 ft 0 in (1.83 m)
- Listed weight: 190 lb (86 kg)

Career information
- High school: Madison Central
- College: Wisconsin
- NFL draft: 1947: 20th round, 180th overall pick

Career history
- Chicago Cardinals (1947)

Awards and highlights
- NFL champion (1947); Third-team All-American (1945); First-team All-Big Ten (1945)

Career NFL statistics
- Games played: 7
- Stats at Pro Football Reference

Clarence Joseph Esser (March 27, 1921 – June 1, 2009) was an American professional football player who was an end in the National Football League (NFL) for the Chicago Cardinals in 1947. He played college football for the Wisconsin Badgers.
