= George Gulyanics =

American football player (1921–1990)

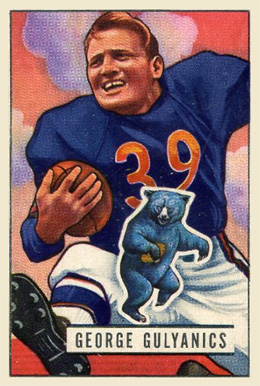

No. 39
- Positions: Halfback; Punter

Personal information
- Born: June 11, 1921; Mishawaka, Indiana, U.S.
- Died: January 19, 1990 (aged 68); Mishawaka, Indiana, U.S.
- Listed height: 6 ft 0 in (1.83 m)
- Listed weight: 198 lb (90 kg)

Career information
- High school: Mishawaka
- College: Alabama
- NFL draft: 1947: undrafted

Career history
- Chicago Bears (1947–1952)

Career NFL statistics
- Rushing yards: 2,081
- Rushing average: 4.1
- Receptions: 52
- Receiving yards: 600
- Punts: 113
- Punting yards: 5,032
- Total touchdowns: 21
- Stats at Pro Football Reference

George Gulyanics (June 11, 1921 – January 19, 1990) was born in Mishawaka, Indiana and was an American professional football player who played halfback and punter for six seasons for the Chicago Bears.

== Biography ==
Gulyanics won the South Bend, Indiana Golden Gloves welterweight title in 1937 and was an Indiana All-State fullback in 1938 at Mishawaka High School. He then attended Jones County Junior College in Ellisville, Mississippi and later played on the 1941 Alabama Crimson Tide football team. He served in the First Army Signal Corps from 1942 to 1945 and went ashore in Normandy at Utah Beach on D-Day Plus 1, June 7, 1944.

While waiting for his return home after the war's end, he played football with a service team in France, where word of his ability filtered back to Chicago Bears' owner-coach, George Halas, who offered him a tryout. In 1946, he played for the Halas-owned Akron Bears of the AFL, before being "promoted" to the Chicago Bears in 1947.

Nicknamed "Little Bronko" (after Bears' Hall-of-Famer Bronko Nagurski), he played six years, mostly at halfback, and was the team's punter. In 1949, Gulyanics lead the NFL in punting with an average of 47.2 yards per punt.

He ranks 15th on the Bears' all-time rushing list with 2,081 yards, a 4.1 yards per rush average; he scored 19 touchdowns between 1947 and his retirement after the 1952 season.

In 1953, he returned to Mishawaka and was elected to the Penn Township assessor's office in 1954. He held that office for 32 years before his retirement in 1986. He and his wife, Ann Marie, had four children. He is a member of the Mishawaka High School Athletics Hall-of-Fame.

== NFL career statistics ==
Legend
| **Bold** | Career high |

=== Regular season ===
| Year | Team | Games | | Rushing | | | | | Receiving | | | | |
| Year | Team | GP | GS | Att | Yds | Avg | Lng | TD | Rec | Yds | Avg | Lng | TD |
|---|---|---|---|---|---|---|---|---|---|---|---|---|---|
| 1947 | CHI | 12 | 4 | 35 | 212 | **6.1** | **46** | 4 | 3 | 22 | 7.3 | 16 | 0 |
| 1948 | CHI | 12 | 8 | 119 | 439 | 3.7 | 24 | 4 | 8 | 130 | **16.3** | 36 | **1** |
| 1949 | CHI | 11 | 11 | 102 | 452 | 4.4 | 31 | **5** | **16** | **165** | 10.3 | 34 | **1** |
| 1950 | CHI | 12 | 12 | **146** | **571** | 3.9 | 31 | 2 | 12 | 137 | 11.4 | **42** | 0 |
| 1951 | CHI | 12 | 7 | 105 | 403 | 3.8 | 30 | 4 | 13 | 146 | 11.2 | 32 | 0 |
| 1952 | CHI | 2 | 1 | 2 | 4 | 2.0 | 3 | 0 | 0 | 0 | 0.0 | 0 | 0 |
| | | 61 | 43 | 509 | 2,081 | 4.1 | 46 | 19 | 52 | 600 | 11.5 | 42 | 2 |

=== Playoffs ===
| Year | Team | Games | | Rushing | | | | | Receiving | | | | |
| Year | Team | GP | GS | Att | Yds | Avg | Lng | TD | Rec | Yds | Avg | Lng | TD |
|---|---|---|---|---|---|---|---|---|---|---|---|---|---|
| 1950 | CHI | 1 | 1 | 15 | 94 | 6.3 | 24 | 0 | 6 | 67 | 11.2 | 18 | 0 |
| | | 1 | 1 | 15 | 94 | 6.3 | 24 | 0 | 6 | 67 | 11.2 | 18 | 0 |
