= Sal Rosato =

American football player (1918–1959)

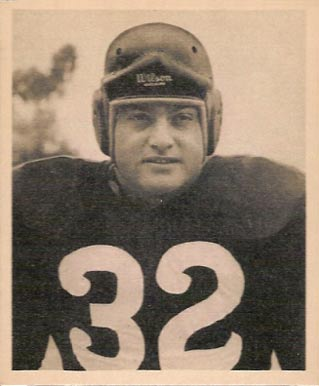
- Rosato, 1948 Bowman football card

No. 32
- Position: Fullback

Personal information
- Born: June 6, 1918; Williamsport, Pennsylvania
- Died: January 12, 1959 (age 40); Alhambra, California
- Listed height: 6 ft 1 in (1.85 m)
- Listed weight: 228 lb (103 kg)

Career information
- High school: Williamsport (PA)
- College: Villanova (1940–1941)

Career history
- March Field (1942–1943); Washington Redskins (1945–1947)

Salvatore Rosato (June 6, 1918 – January 12, 1959) was an American football fullback. He played for Villanova University (1940–1941), March Field (1942–1943), and the Washington Redskins (1945–1947).

== Early life ==
Rosato was born in 1918 in Williamsport, Pennsylvania, and attended Williamsport High School. He attended Villanova University and played college football for the Villanova Wildcats in 1940 and 1941.

== Military and pro football ==
Rosato served in the United States Army Air Forces during World War II. He played with the 1942 and 1943 March Field Flyers football teams. After the war, he played professional football as a fullback in the National Football League (NFL) for the Washington Redskins from 1945 to 1947. He appeared in a total of 24 games for the Redskins, seven of them as a starter.

== Family and later years ==
Rosato married Elizabeth Jane Crennen in Williamsport in 1948. He died of a heart attack in 1959 at age 40 while playing in an industrial league basketball game in Alhambra, California.
