= Charley Sarratt =

American football player (1923–2018)

No. 40
- Position: Quarterback

Personal information
- Born: October 22, 1923; Greenville, South Carolina, U.S.
- Died: June 3, 2018 (aged 94); Oklahoma City, Oklahoma, U.S.
- Listed height: 6 ft 1 in (1.85 m)
- Listed weight: 185 lb (84 kg)

Career information
- High school: Belton-Honea (Honea Path, South Carolina)
- College: Clemson; Oklahoma
- NFL draft: 1947: 12th round, 101st overall pick

Career history
- Detroit Lions (1948)

Career NFL statistics
- Passing yards: 48
- TD–INT: 0-0
- Passer rating: 118.7
- Stats at Pro Football Reference

Charles Franklin Sarratt (October 22, 1923 – June 3, 2018) was an American professional football player who was an end for one season with the Detroit Lions of the National Football League (NFL). He played college football for the Oklahoma Sooners, having previously attended Belton High School in Belton, South Carolina.
