= Ralph Olsen =

American football player and coach (1924–1994)

No. 19
- Position: Defensive end

Personal information
- Born: April 10, 1924; Salt Lake City, Utah, U.S.
- Died: November 28, 1994 (aged 70); Fruit Heights, Utah, U.S.
- Listed height: 6 ft 4 in (1.93 m)
- Listed weight: 220 lb (100 kg)

Career information
- High school: West (Salt Lake City)
- College: Utah
- NFL draft: 1947: 32nd round, 297th overall pick

Career history

Playing
- Green Bay Packers (1949)

Coaching
- Montana Mines (1952–1956) Head coach; Napa (1957) Line coach; American River (1958) Line coach; American River (1959–1962) Head coach

Career NFL statistics
- Fumble recoveries: 1
- Stats at Pro Football Reference

Ralph Kenneth Olsen (April 10, 1924 – November 28, 1994) was an American professional football player and coach. He played as a defensive end in the National Football League (NFL). Olsen was selected by the Green Bay Packers in the 32nd round of the 1947 NFL draft and played with the team during the 1949 NFL season. He served as the head football coach at the Montana State School of Mines—now known as Montana Technological University from 1952 to 1956.

== Head coaching record ==
=== Junior college ===
Year	Team	Overall	Conference	Standing	Bowl/playoffs
American River Beavers (Golden Valley Conference) (1959–1961)
1959	American River		2–3	T–3rd	
1960	American River	8–1	5–0	1st	
1961	American River		1–4	6th	
American River Beavers (Valley Conference) (1962)
1962	American River	3–6	1–4	6th	
American River:			9–11		
Total:					
National championship Conference title Conference division title or championship game berth
