= Al Johnson (American football coach) =

American football player, coach, and administrator (1922–2011)

No. 27
- Positions: Quarterback, Punter

Personal information
- Born: August 15, 1922; Munday, Texas, U.S.
- Died: May 5, 2011 (aged 88); Grants, New Mexico, U.S.
- Listed height: 6 ft 0 in (1.83 m)
- Listed weight: 175 lb (79 kg)

Career information
- High school: Hamlin (Hamlin, Texas)
- College: Hardin-Simmons (1942, 1946-1947)
- NFL draft: 1947: 14th round, 121st overall pick

Career history

Playing
- Philadelphia Eagles (1948)

Coaching
- Football: Western New Mexico (1950-1966) Head coach; Baseball: Western New Mexico (1955-1970) Head coach

Operations
- Western New Mexico (1969-1981) Athletic director

Awards and highlights
- NFL champion (1948)
- Stats at Pro Football Reference

Stephen Alvin Johnson (August 15, 1922 – May 5, 2011) was an American football player, coach of football and baseball, and college athletics administrator. He was drafted by the Philadelphia Eagles in the 14th round (121st overall) of the 1947 NFL draft. With the Eagles in 1948, he won an NFL Championship. He served as the head football coach at Western New Mexico University in Silver City, New Mexico from 1950 to 1966. He also coached the baseball team at Western New Mexico from 1955 to 1970. He died at his home in Grants, New Mexico in 2011.
