= Bill O'Brien (American football, born 1924) =

American football player (1924–2005)

Profile
- Position: Halfback

Personal information
- Born: August 25, 1924; Detroit
- Died: May 8, 2005 (aged 80); Eastport, Michigan
- Listed height: 6 ft 0 in (1.83 m)
- Listed weight: 180 lb (82 kg)

Career information
- High school: University of Detroit Jesuit (MI)

Career history
- Detroit Lions (1947)

Career statistics
- Games: 9
- Stats at Pro Football Reference

William George O'Brien (August 25, 1924 – May 8, 2005) was an American football player.

Born in Detroit, O'Brien attended University of Detroit Jesuit High School. He played professional football in the National Football League as a halfback for the Detroit Lions. He appeared in nine games for the Lions during the 1947 season.
