= Roy Kurrasch =

American football player (1922–2015)

No. 57, 51
- Position: End

Personal information
- Born: October 8, 1922; Toledo, Ohio, U.S.
- Died: July 11, 2015 (aged 92); Los Angeles, California, U.S.
- Listed height: 6 ft 2 in (1.88 m)
- Listed weight: 195 lb (88 kg)

Career information
- High school: Hollywood (Hollywood, California)
- College: UCLA
- NFL draft: 1947: 9th round, 68th overall pick

Career history
- New York Yankees (1947); Cleveland Browns (1948)*; Pittsburgh Steelers (1948)
- * Offseason or practice squad member only

Career NFL/AAFC statistics
- Receptions: 2
- Receiving yards: 53
- Stats at Pro Football Reference

Roy William Kurrasch (October 8, 1922 – July 11, 2015) was an American professional football end in the National Football League (NFL) for the Pittsburgh Steelers. He was born in Toledo, Ohio. He also played in the All-America Football Conference (AAFC) for the New York Yankees. Kurrasch played college football at the University of California, Los Angeles and was selected by the Washington Redskins in the ninth round of the 1947 NFL draft. Kurrasch died in July 2015, at the age of 92.
