= Harry Dowda =

American football player (1922–1996)

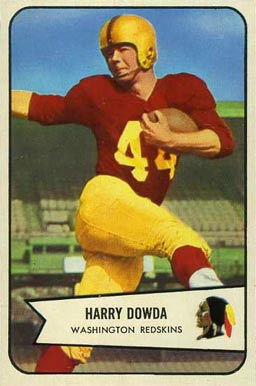
- Dowda on a 1954 Bowman football card

No. 22, 44
- Positions: Defensive back, halfback

Personal information
- Born: December 29, 1922; Atlanta, Georgia, U.S.
- Died: June 24, 1996 (aged 73); Wintergreen, Virginia, U.S.
- Listed height: 6 ft 2 in (1.88 m)
- Listed weight: 195 lb (88 kg)

Career information
- High school: Hickory (Hickory, North Carolina)
- College: Wake Forest (1945–1948)
- NFL draft: 1947: 19th round, 168th overall pick

Career history
- Washington Redskins (1949–1953); Philadelphia Eagles (1954–1955)

Career NFL statistics
- Rushing yards: 405
- Rushing average: 3.3
- Receptions: 18
- Receiving yards: 277
- Interceptions: 16
- Total touchdowns: 6
- Stats at Pro Football Reference

Harry Clinton Dowda (December 29, 1922 – June 24, 1996) was an American professional football defensive back in the National Football League (NFL) for the Washington Redskins and Philadelphia Eagles. He played college football at Wake Forest University. He served three years in the Airborne during World War II, and saw action in the Battle of Bulge and Crossing the Rhine. In 1953, he was married to the late Bette Marable Patterson and had two children.

== Early life ==
Harry Dowda was born on December 29, 1922. He attended West Fulton High School in Georgia and Hickory High School in Hickory, North Carolina. Dowda played college football at Wake Forest University. In 1947, Dowda was drafted into the NFL in the 19th round.

== Professional career ==
Dowda was selected in the 19th round (168th pick) in the 1947 NFL draft as a halfback. Dowda played for the Washington Redskins from 1949 to 1953. He then played for the Philadelphia Eagles from 1954 to 1955. In 1953, Dowda intercepted 5 passes and returned them 73 yards, scoring one touchdown.
