= Ernie Williamson =

American football player and coach (1922–2002)

No. 47, 71, 42, 59
- Position: Tackle

Personal information
- Born: September 9, 1922; Crewe, Virginia, U.S.
- Died: March 6, 2002 (aged 79); Chapel Hill, North Carolina, U.S.
- Listed height: 6 ft 4 in (1.93 m)
- Listed weight: 245 lb (111 kg)

Career information
- High school: Crewe
- College: Apprentice (1942); North Carolina (1946)
- NFL draft: 1947: 10th round, 79th overall pick

Career history

Playing
- Washington Redskins (1947); New York Giants (1948); Los Angeles Dons (1949); Richmond Rebels (1950)

Coaching
- Sewanee (1952–1953) Line coach; Sewanee (1954–1956) Head coach

Career NFL/AAFC statistics
- Games played: 23
- Games started: 3
- Fumble recoveries: 1
- Stats at Pro Football Reference

Ernest Warriner Williamson (September 9, 1922 – March 6, 2002) was an American professional football player and coach. He played professionally as a tackle in the National Football League (NFL) for the Washington Redskins and New York Giants and in the All-America Football Conference (AAFC) for the Los Angeles Dons. Williamson played college football at the University of North Carolina. He served as the head football coach at Sewanee: The University of the South in Sewanee, Tennessee from 1954 to 1956, compiling a record of 2–22–1.

== Early life and college career ==
Williamson was born in Crewe, Virginia and attended Crewe High School. After graduating high school, he enlisted in the United States Navy and became a member of the Great Lakes Navy Bluejackets football team and he played for coach Paul Brown. He served in the South Pacific during World War II.

After attending The Apprentice School in Newport News, Virginia, Williamson attended and played college football at the University of North Carolina (UNC) in 1946. The 1946 North Carolina Tar Heels football team won the Southern Conference title and lost to Georgia in the Sugar Bowl. Williamson received an undergraduate degree in 1951 and a master's degree from UNC in 1952, both in physical education.

== Professional career ==
Williamson was drafted in the tenth round of the 1947 NFL draft by the Washington Redskins. He then played for the New York Giants and the Los Angeles Dons of the All-America Football Conference (AAFC), before a knee-injury ended his playing career.

== Coaching and administrative career ==
In 1952, Williamson was hired as line coach for the football team and head coach for the track team at Sewanee: The University of the South in Sewanee, Tennessee. He served as an assistant football coach for two seasons before succeeding William C. White as head coach of the Sewanee Tigers football program in 1954.

In 1957, Williamson returned to the University of North Carolina to head the Educational Foundation, a foundation that raises money for scholarships for student-athletes, which he led for three decades. Williamson received the William R. Davie Award from the UNC Board of Trustees in 1986 to recognize his distinguished service to the University. He also was the recipient of a Priceless Gem from the Department of Athletics in 1982 and a Distinguished Alumnus Award in 1997.

== Death ==
Williamson died on March 6, 2002, in Chapel Hill, North Carolina, after suffering a stroke.

== Head coaching record ==
=== College football ===
Year	Team	Overall	Conference	Standing	Bowl/playoffs
Sewanee Tigers (Independent) (1954–1956)
1954	Sewanee	0–8			
1955	Sewanee	1–8			
1956	Sewanee	1–6–1			
Sewanee:		2–22–1			
Total:		2–22–1			
