= Frank Minini =

American football player (1921–2005)

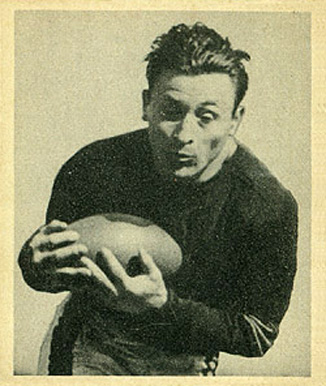
- Minini on a 1948 Bowman football card

No. 44, 25
- Position: Halfback

Personal information
- Born: December 23, 1921; Paso Robles, California, U.S.
- Died: November 12, 2005 (aged 83)
- Listed height: 6 ft 1 in (1.85 m)
- Listed weight: 209 lb (95 kg)

Career information
- High school: Paso Robles
- College: San Jose State (1941, 1946)
- NFL draft: 1947: 3rd round, 23rd overall pick

Career history
- Chicago Bears (1947–1948); Pittsburgh Steelers (1949)

Career NFL statistics
- Rushing yards: 216
- Rushing average: 4.2
- Receptions: 3
- Receiving yards: 37
- Total touchdowns: 7
- Stats at Pro Football Reference

Frank David Minini (December 23, 1921 – November 12, 2005) was an American professional football halfback who played three seasons in the National Football League (NFL) with the Chicago Bears and Pittsburgh Steelers. He was selected by the Bears in the third round of the 1947 NFL draft after playing college football at San Jose State University.

== Early life and college ==
Frank David Minini was born on December 23, 1921, in Paso Robles, California. He attended Paso Robles High School in Paso Robles.

Minini was a letterman for the San Jose State Spartans of San Jose State University in 1941. He then served in the United States Army during World War II. After the war, he lettered for the Spartans in 1946.

== Professional career ==
Minini was selected by the Chicago Bears in the third round, with the 23rd overall pick, of the 1947 NFL draft. He played in all 12 games, starting nine, for the Bears during the 1947 season, recording 26 rushing attempts for 132 yards and two touchdowns, two catches for 23 yards, 11 kick returns for 261 yards, three fumbles, two fumble recoveries, and one interception. The Bears finished the year with an 8–4, good for second place in the Western Division. Minini appeared in all 12 games again in 1948, starting three, totaling 24 carries for 79 yards and two touchdowns, one reception 14 yards and a touchdown, 12 kick returns for 370 yards and one touchdown, two fumbles and one fumble recovery that was returned 35 yards for a touchdown. The Bears went 10–2 that year, finishing second place in the Western Division for the second straight season.

On September 23, 1949, it was reported that Minini had been traded to the Pittsburgh Steelers for a 1950 draft pick. He played in all 12 games, starting seven, for the Steelers during the 1949 season, accumulating one carry for five yards, 16 kick returns for 390 yards, and one fumble. The Steelers finished with a 6–5–1 record, good for second in the Eastern Division. He became a free agent after the season.

== Personal life ==
Minini died on November 12, 2005.
