= Bob Leonetti =

American football player (1923–1973)

- Leonetti, circa 1946

No. 30, 31
- Position: Guard

Personal information
- Born: January 1, 1923; Mount Carmel, Pennsylvania, U.S.
- Died: August 16, 1973 (aged 50)
- Listed height: 6 ft 0 in (1.83 m)
- Listed weight: 230 lb (104 kg)

Career information
- High school: Mount Carmel
- College: Wake Forest (1946-1947)
- NFL draft: 1947: 9th round, 71st overall pick

Career history
- Buffalo Bills (1948); Brooklyn Dodgers (1948)

Career AAFC statistics
- Games played: 11
- Stats at Pro Football Reference

Robert Phillip Leonetti (January 1, 1923 – August 1973) was an American professional football player who played at the guard position on both offense and defense. He played college football for Wake Forest in 1946 and 1947 and professional football for the Buffalo Bills and Brooklyn Dodgers in 1948.

== Early life ==
Leonetti was born in 1923 in Mount Carmel, Pennsylvania, and attended Mount Carmel High School.

== College football and military service ==
Leonetti began playing college football as a tackle at George Washington University. served in the Army during World War II. After the war, he played college football for Wake Forest during its 1946 and 1947 seasons.

== Professional football ==
He was selected by the Philadelphia Eagles in the ninth round (71st overall pick) of the 1947 NFL draft but did not play for the Eagles. He played professional football in the All-America Football Conference (AAFC) for the Buffalo Bills and Brooklyn Dodgers during their 1948 seasons. He appeared in two games for Buffalo before being traded to Brooklyn where he appeared in either seven or nine games.

== Later life ==
He died in 1973 at age 50.
