= Charles Smith (American football) =

American football player (1924–2013)

No. 19
- Position: Back

Personal information
- Born: March 13, 1924; Aldrich, Missouri, U.S.
- Died: December 10, 2013 (aged 89); East Palatka, Florida, U.S.
- Listed height: 5 ft 11 in (1.80 m)
- Listed weight: 168 lb (76 kg)

Career information
- High school: Palatka (FL)
- College: Georgia
- NFL draft: 1947: 16th round, 142nd overall pick

Career history

Playing
- Chicago Cardinals (1947)

Coaching
- Madison County High School (1948–1949) Head coach; Palatka High School (1950) Assistant coach; Palatka High School (1951–1962) Head coach; Florida (1963–1970) Head recruiter & running backs coach; Eastside High School (1971–1980) Head coach

Awards and highlights
- NFL champion (1947)

Career NFL statistics
- Rushing yards: 23
- Rushing average: 2.6
- Interceptions: 1
- Stats at Pro Football Reference

Charles Harlin "Rabbit" Smith (March 13, 1924 – December 10, 2013) was an American professional football back who played one season with the Chicago Cardinals of the National Football League (NFL). He was drafted by the Chicago Cardinals in the 16th round of the 1947 NFL draft. He played college football at the University of Georgia. He was nicknamed Rabbit for his speed.

== Early life ==
Smith played high school football as a two-way back at Palatka High School in Palatka, Florida. He was also a catcher and middle infielder on the baseball team, a forward in basketball and a jumper, sprinter and relay man in track. He graduated in 1943.

== College career ==
Smith played college football and baseball for the Georgia Bulldogs.

== Professional career ==
Smith was selected by the Chicago Cardinals in the 16th round, with the 142nd overall pick, of the 1947 NFL draft and signed with the team on March 2, 1947. He played in seven games for the Cardinals during the 1947 season. He was released by the Cardinals on May 21, 1948.

== Coaching career ==
Smith was the head football coach at Madison County High School in Madison County, Georgia from 1948 to 1949. He served as an assistant coach at Palatka High School in 1950 and then the team's head coach from 1951 to 1962. He was the head recruiter and running backs coach for the Florida Gators from 1963 to 1970. Smith served as the head coach of Eastside High School in Gainesville, Florida from 1971 to 1980 and won three championships. He retired after the 1980 season.
