= T. J. Campion =

American football player (1918–1996)

No. 72
- Position: Tackle

Personal information
- Born: November 14, 1918; Louisville, Kentucky, U.S.
- Died: February 8, 1996 (aged 77); Louisville, Kentucky, U.S.
- Listed height: 6 ft 2 in (1.88 m)
- Listed weight: 235 lb (107 kg)

Career information
- High school: Louisville Male
- College: Southeastern Louisiana
- NFL draft: 1947: 19th round, 170th overall pick

Career history
- Philadelphia Eagles (1947); Wilmington Clippers (1947)

Awards and highlights
- Second-team Little All-American (1942); Southeastern Louisiana Athletics Hall of Fame

Career NFL statistics
- Games played: 5
- Games started: 0
- Stats at Pro Football Reference

Thomas Joseph Campion Jr. (November 14, 1918 – February 8, 1996) was an American professional football player who was a tackle for one season with the Philadelphia Eagles of the National Football League (NFL). He played college football for the Southeastern Louisiana Lions and was selected by the Eagles in the 19th round of the 1947 NFL draft.

== Early life and education ==
T. J. Campion was born on November 14, 1918, in Louisville, Kentucky. He attended Male High School there, before moving to Louisiana to play college football. With the Southeastern Louisiana Lions football team, Campion played four seasons. As a junior in 1942, he led the conference with six blocked punts and was named by Associated Press a "Little All-American." He was the school's first All-America selection. He was a second-team selection at the tackle position. His career was delayed three years due to World War II, in which he served for the United States Navy. He returned to the school in 1946, and earned another All-American selection. He later became one of the first four Southeastern Athletic Hall of Fame members.

== Professional career ==
Campion was selected in the 19th round (170th overall) of the 1947 NFL draft by the Philadelphia Eagles. He made the final roster and spent the months of September and October as a backup tackle, appearing in five games. On November 4, Campion was sent to the Wilmington Clippers, the Eagles' farm team. Though expected to play, Campion did not appear in any games as a Clipper.

== Later life and death ==
He later worked for the Bob Hook Chevrolet and V. V. Cooke companies. He died on February 8, 1996, in his hometown of Louisville, Kentucky.
