= Dick Stovall =

American football player (1922–1999)

No. 45
- Position: Center

Personal information
- Born: June 4, 1922; Albany, Texas
- Died: June 4, 1999 (aged 77)
- Listed height: 6 ft 0 in (1.83 m)
- Listed weight: 202 lb (92 kg)

Career information
- High school: Abilene (TX)
- College: Abilene Christian

Career history
- 1947–1948: Detroit Lions
- 1949: Washington Redskins
- Stats at Pro Football Reference

Richard "Moose" Southerton Stovall (June 4, 1922 – June 4, 1999) was an American football center in the National Football League for the Detroit Lions and the Washington Redskins. He played college football at Abilene Christian University which was Abilene Christian College at that time.
