= Bob Kelly (American football, born 1925) =

American football player (1925–2016)

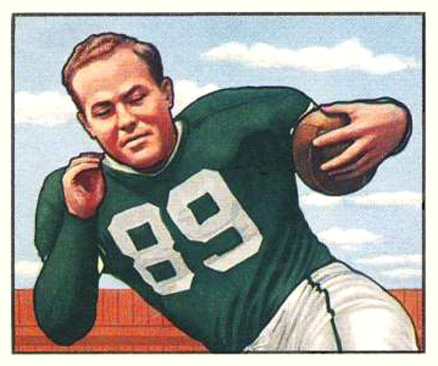
- Kelly on a 1950 Bowman football card

No. 85, 75, 89
- Positions: Halfback, defensive back

Personal information
- Born: June 6, 1925; Chicago, Illinois, U.S.
- Died: December 31, 2016 (aged 91)
- Listed height: 5 ft 10 in (1.78 m)
- Listed weight: 190 lb (86 kg)

Career information
- High school: Leo (Chicago)
- College: Notre Dame (1943-1944); Navy (1945)
- NFL draft: 1947: 10th round, 81st overall pick

Career history
- Los Angeles Dons (1947-1948); Baltimore Colts (1949)

Awards and highlights
- National champion (1943); Second-team All-American (1944)

Career AAFC statistics
- Rushing yards: 232
- Rushing average: 3.7
- Receptions: 11
- Receiving yards: 93
- Total touchdowns: 3
- Interceptions: 8
- Stats at Pro Football Reference

Robert Joseph Kelly (June 6, 1925 – December 31, 2016) was an American professional football player who was a defensive back for the Los Angeles Dons and Baltimore Colts of the All-America Football Conference (AAFC). Kelly died in Tennessee on December 31, 2016, at the age of 91.
