= Bill Mackrides =

American gridiron football player (1925–2019)

No. 13, 20, 39, 94
- Position: Quarterback

Personal information
- Born: July 8, 1925; Philadelphia, Pennsylvania, U.S.
- Died: January 22, 2019 (aged 93); Edgmont Township, Pennsylvania, U.S.
- Listed height: 5 ft 11 in (1.80 m)
- Listed weight: 182 lb (83 kg)

Career information
- High school: West Philadelphia
- College: Nevada (1943-1944, 1946)
- NFL draft: 1947: 3rd round, 19th overall pick

Career history
- Philadelphia Eagles (1947–1951); Hamilton Tiger-Cats (1952); New York Giants (1953); Pittsburgh Steelers (1953)

Awards and highlights
- 2× NFL champion (1948, 1949); CFL East All Star (1952)

Career NFL statistics
- Passing attempts: 315
- Passing completions: 131
- Completion percentage: 41.6%
- TD–INT: 15–28
- Passing yards: 1,583
- Passer rating: 36.5
- Stats at Pro Football Reference

William Mackrides (/mækˈriːdiːz/ mak-REE-deez; July 8, 1925 – January 22, 2019) was an American professional football player who was a quarterback for the Philadelphia Eagles of the National Football League (NFL). He helped the Eagles win the 1948 and 1949 NFL Championships.

== Early life ==
Mackrides played college football for the University of Nevada, Reno and led the nation in passing in 1946. In his last professional season in 1953, Mackrides played for the Pittsburgh Steelers and was the last Steeler to wear uniform number 13 in a regular season game until punter Jeremy Kapinos wore that number in 2010.

Mackrides later gained degrees (MS and PhD) in education, undergraduate at West Chester State College, a master's degree at the University of Pennsylvania, and a doctorate in psychology at the University of New Mexico. He has since retired and resides in Delaware County, Pennsylvania. He also founded Indian Springs Day Camp, a summer day camp in Chester Springs, Pennsylvania, in 1959, which family owned and operated as of 2013.

== See also ==
- List of NCAA major college football yearly passing leaders
