= Carl Schuette =

American football player and coach (1922–1975)

No. 74, 23, 17
- Positions: Linebacker, center, defensive back

Personal information
- Born: April 4, 1922; Sheboygan, Wisconsin, U.S.
- Died: December 9, 1975 (aged 53); Boston, Massachusetts, U.S.
- Listed height: 6 ft 1 in (1.85 m)
- Listed weight: 206 lb (93 kg)

Career information
- High school: Sheboygan Central
- College: Marquette (1942, 1946-1947)
- NFL draft: 1947: 22nd round, 196th overall pick

Career history

Playing
- Buffalo Bills (1948-1949); Green Bay Packers (1950–1951)

Coaching
- Hamilton Tiger-Cats (1969–1970) Assistant coach

Career NFL/AAFC statistics
- Games played: 48
- Games started: 12
- Fumble recoveries: 3
- Interceptions: 5
- Total touchdowns: 1
- Stats at Pro Football Reference

Charles William "Carl" Schuette (April 4, 1922 – 1975) was an American football player and coach. He played linebacker in the All-America Football Conference (AAFC) and National Football League (NFL) for the Buffalo Bills and Green Bay Packers from 1948 to 1951. He played college football at Marquette University.

== Biography ==
Schuette was on April 4, 1922, in Sheboygan, Wisconsin. He later coached football at Marquette, Brown University, Colgate University, the United States Naval Academy, Harvard University, and with the Saskatchewan Roughriders and Hamilton Tiger-Cats of the Canadian Football League (CFL).
