= Weldon W. Edwards =

American politician

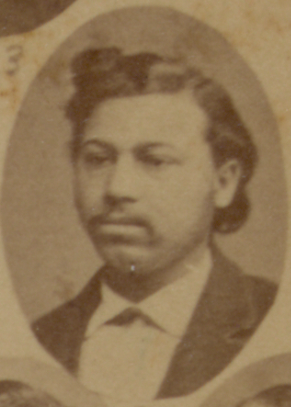

Weldon W. Edwards was an alderman, deputy sheriff, and state legislator in Mississippi. He represented Warren County, Mississippi in the Mississippi House of Representatives from 1874 to 1877 and in 1882 and 1883.

Described as a quadroon in a contemporary newspaper report, he was educated by missionaries.

He testified about attacks on African American Republicans in Vicksburg, Mississippi during the 1875 election.

== See also ==
- African American officeholders from the end of the Civil War until before 1900
