= Emile Fritz =

American football player (1920–2015)

Profile
- Position: Guard

Personal information
- Born: February 1920
- Died: September 14, 2015 (aged 95); Woodstown, New Jersey, U.S.

Career information
- College: Maryland; Vanderbilt
- NFL draft: 1947: 13th round, 115th overall pick

Emile Frederick Fritz Jr. (February 1920 – September 14, 2015) was an American football player. Fritz was selected in the thirteenth round of the 1947 NFL draft.

In the late 1930s, Fritz attended Vanderbilt University, where he played on the football team as a guard.

A World War II veteran, he enlisted in the Army Air Force shortly after the attack on Pearl Harbor in 1941 and served as a B-17 mechanic. He served overseas in the United States military before enrolling again in college, this time at the University of Maryland. At Maryland in 1945, Fritz played under head coach Paul "Bear" Bryant, who had been an assistant coach for Fritz at Vanderbilt before the war.

In 1946, the Associated Press named Fritz an honorable mention All-American.

Fritz was selected in the thirteenth round of the 1947 NFL draft (115th overall) by the Chicago Bears.

At Maryland, Fritz was a member of the Delta Phi chapter of the Sigma Nu fraternity.

Fritz died on September 14, 2015, at the age of 95, in Woodstown, New Jersey.
