= Bob Skoglund =

American football player (1925–1949)

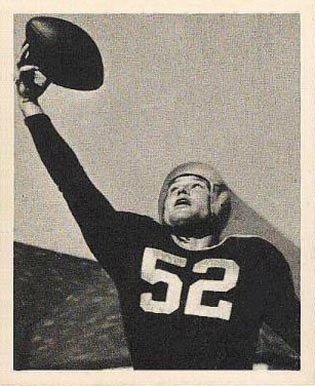
- Skoglund on a 1948 Bowman football card

No. 52
- Position: Defensive end

Personal information
- Born: July 29, 1925; Chicago, Illinois, U.S.
- Died: January 1, 1949 (aged 23); Evanston, Illinois, U.S.
- Listed height: 6 ft 1 in (1.85 m)
- Listed weight: 198 lb (90 kg)

Career information
- High school: Loyola Academy (Chicago)
- College: Notre Dame (1944-1946)
- NFL draft: 1947: 13th round, 111th overall pick

Career history
- Green Bay Packers (1947)

Awards and highlights
- National champion (1946)

Career NFL statistics
- Games played: 9
- Games started: 1
- Fumble recoveries: 2
- Stats at Pro Football Reference

Robert W. Skoglund (July 29, 1925 – January 1, 1949) was an American professional football defensive end in the National Football League (NFL).

Skoglund was born in Chicago, Illinois. He starred at Loyola Academy in Chicago, before attending the University of Notre Dame. A 6'1" end, he participated in the 1945 and 1946 East-West Shrine Games and earned three letters with the Fighting Irish. He later played with the Green Bay Packers during the 1947 NFL season. Skoglund died in 1949.
