= Ted Scalissi =

American football and basketball player (1921–1987)

Personal information
- Born: October 26, 1921 Madison, Wisconsin, U.S.
- Died: January 6, 1987 (aged 65) Janesville, Wisconsin, U.S.
- Listed height: 5 ft 8 in (1.73 m)
- Listed weight: 160 lb (73 kg)

Career information
- High school: Central (Madison, Wisconsin)
- College: Ripon (1941–1943, 1946–1947)
- Position: Guard

Career history
- 1946–1948: Oshkosh All-Stars
- 1947–1948: Beaver Dam Olo Soap

Theodore Glenn Scalissi (October 26, 1921 – January 6, 1987) was a professional American football and basketball player. He was born in Madison, Wisconsin.

== Professional sports career ==
Scalissi played with the Chicago Rockets of the All-America Football Conference (AAFC) in 1947. He had also been drafted by the Green Bay Packers in the 17th round of the 1947 NFL draft. Collegiately, he played football, basketball, and track and field at Ripon College.

Scalissi also played for the Oshkosh All-Stars in the National Basketball League during the 1947–48 season. The National Basketball League was a forerunner to the modern National Basketball Association (NBA).

== Head coaching record ==
=== College football ===
Year	Team	Overall	Conference	Standing	Bowl/playoffs
Milton Wildcats (Gateway Conference) (1965–1969)
1965	Milton	4–3	3–1	2nd	
1966	Milton	5–4	3–0	1st	
1967	Milton	2–6	2–2	3rd	
1968	Milton		3–1	2nd	
1969	Milton		3–1	2nd	
Milton:			14–6		
Total:					
National championship Conference title Conference division title or championship game berth
