= Joe Watt =

Canadian gridiron football player (1919–1983)

No. 56, 15, 14, 4
- Positions: Halfback, defensive back

Personal information
- Born: June 18, 1919; Montreal, Quebec, Canada
- Died: June 27, 1983 (aged 64); Ithaca, New York, U.S.
- Listed height: 5 ft 11 in (1.80 m)
- Listed weight: 184 lb (83 kg)

Career information
- High school: Erasmus Hall (Brooklyn, New York)
- College: Syracuse
- NFL draft: 1947: 7th round, 47th overall pick

Career history
- Boston Yanks (1947); Detroit Lions (1947–1948); New York Bulldogs (1949)

Career NFL statistics
- Rushing yards: 61
- Rushing average: 2.0
- Receptions: 6
- Receiving yards: 133
- Total touchdowns: 2
- Interceptions: 7
- Stats at Pro Football Reference

Joseph Chessar Watt (June 18, 1919 – June 27, 1983) was an American football halfback who played professionally for three seasons in the National Football League (NFL

Watt was born in Montreal and attended Erasmus High School in Brooklyn. He played college football and college baseball at Syracuse University. Watt served as a lieutenant in the United States Army during World War II and was a member of the 1944 Camp Lee Travellers football team.

Watt was selected by the Boston Yanks as the 47th pick in the seventh round of the 1947 NFL draft. He later played for the Detroit Lions and the New York Bulldogs.

Watt later worked for the F. & M. Schaefer Brewing Company for over 20 years. He was the founder and president of the Joseph C. Watt Distributing Co. in Ithaca, New York until his retirement in 1982. Watt died on June 27, 1983, at Tomkins Community Hospital, in Ithaca.
