= Ray Ramsey =

American gridiron football player (1921–2009)

- Born: July 18, 1921; Springfield, Illinois, U.S.
- Died: August 25, 2009 (aged 88); Springfield, Illinois, U.S.
- Other name: Rocket Ray Ramsey
- Height: 6 ft 2 in (188 cm)
- Football career

No. 87
- Position: Defensive back

Career information
- College: Bradley
- NFL draft: 1947: 10th round, 82 (By the Chicago Cardinals)th overall pick

Career history
- Chicago Rockets (1947–1948); Brooklyn Dodgers (1948); Chicago Hornets (1949); Chicago Cardinals (1950–1953); Hamilton Tiger-Cats (1954–1956)

Awards and highlights
- IRFU All-Star – 1954

Career NFL statistics
- Rushing att-yards: 124-524
- Receptions-yards: 88-1729
- Touchdowns: 18
- Interceptions: 21
- Stats at Pro Football Reference
- Basketball career

Career information
- High school: Lanphier (Springfield, Illinois)
- College: Bradley (1941–1943, 1945–1947)
- Position: Shooting guard / small forward
- Number: 14

Career history
- 1947–1948: Tri-Cities Blackhawks
- 1948–1949: Baltimore Bullets
- Stats at NBA.com
- Stats at Basketball Reference

"Rocket" Raymond LeRoy Ramsey (July 18, 1921 – August 25, 2009) was an American multi-sport athlete. Following his college career at Bradley University, where he starred in basketball, football, and track and field, he went on to play professionally in basketball and football. He was a defensive back for the Chicago Cardinals from 1950 to 1953 and remains the Cardinals all-time record holder for interception return yardage in a single season with 237 which he set in the 1953 season. He also played in the All-America Football Conference and in the Interprovincial Rugby Football Union, a forerunner of the Canadian Football League.

In addition, Ramsey had a brief professional basketball career, playing for the Tri-Cities Blackhawks in the National Basketball League and the Baltimore Bullets in the Basketball Association of America.

== Statistics ==
=== Pro basketball statistics ===
Legend
| GP | Games played |
| FG% | Field-goal percentage |
| FT% | Free-throw percentage |
| APG | Assists per game |
| PPG | Points per game |

==== Regular season ====
| Year | Team | League | GP | FG% | FT% | APG | PPG |
|---|---|---|---|---|---|---|---|
| 1947–48 | Tri-Cities | NBL | 2 | - | - | .0 | 0.0 |
| 1948–49 | Baltimore | BAA | 2 | .000 | 1.000 | .0 | 1.0 |
| Career | | | 4 | .000 | 1.000 | .0 | 0.5 |
