= Lloyd Merriman =

American baseball player (1924–2004)

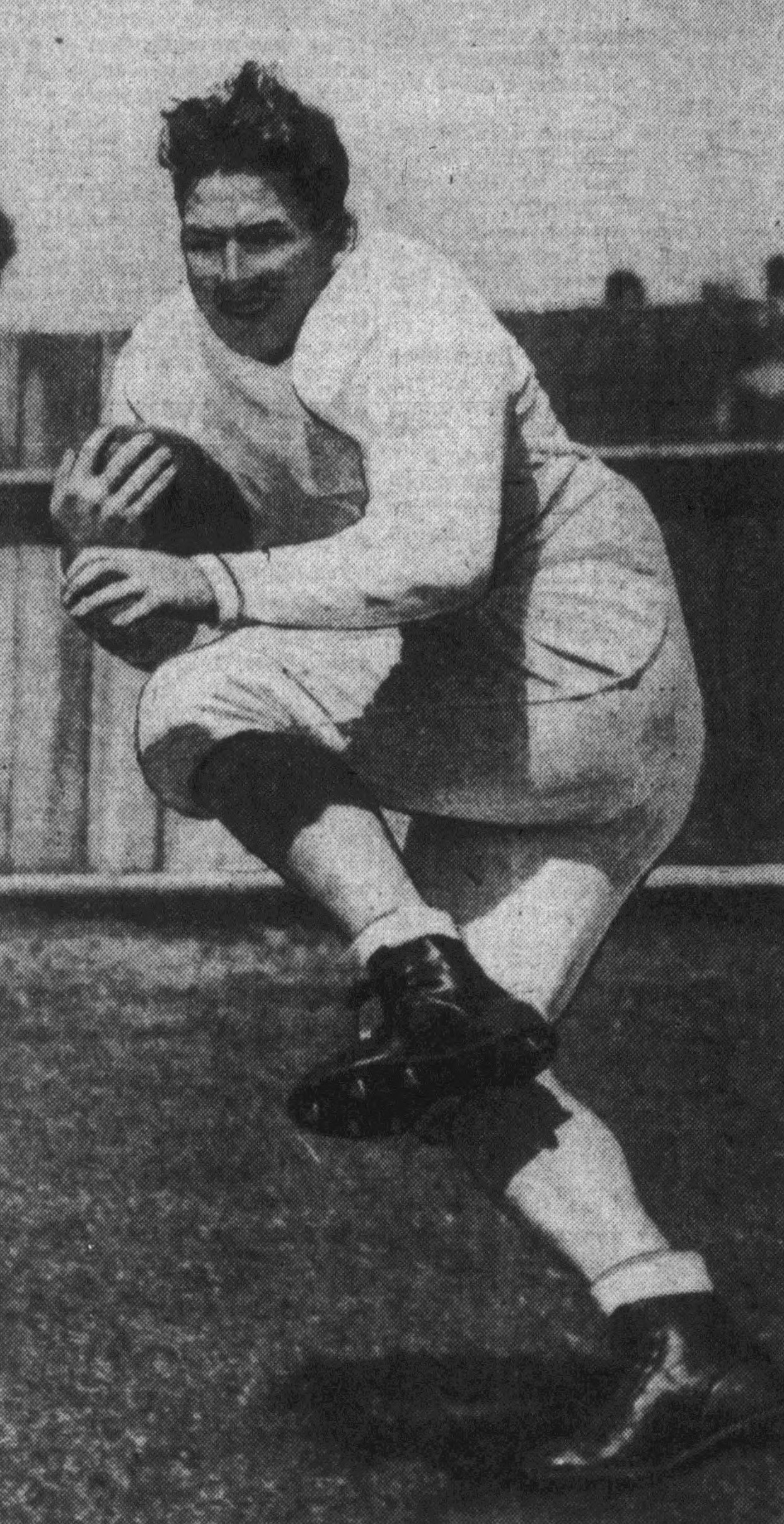
- Merriman during his football career at Stanford University, circa 1946
- Outfielder
- Born: August 2, 1924; Clovis, California, U.S.
- Died: January 20, 2004 (aged 79); Fresno, California, U.S.
- Batted: Left Threw: Left

MLB debut
- April 24, 1949, for the Cincinnati Reds

Last MLB appearance
- September 17, 1955, for the Chicago Cubs

MLB statistics
- Batting average: .242
- Home runs: 12
- Runs batted in: 117
- Stats at Baseball Reference

Teams
- Cincinnati Reds/Redlegs (1949–1951, 1954); Chicago White Sox (1955); Chicago Cubs (1955)

Lloyd Archer Merriman (August 2, 1924 – January 20, 2004) was an American athlete who played professional baseball as an outfielder in the Major Leagues from 1949 to 1955 for the Cincinnati Reds, Chicago White Sox and Chicago Cubs and college baseball and football at Stanford University.

Merriman was born in Clovis, California and postponed college to serve as a United States naval aviator during World War II.He finished flight school shortly before the Japanese surrendered.

At Stanford he was a two sport star, playing both fullback for the football team and outfielder for the baseball team. He was good enough at football to be drafted by the Bears in the fifth round of the 1947 NFL draft (32nd overall) but declined to play football, choosing instead to focus on baseball.

As a baseball player, Merriman threw and batted left-handed, stood 6 feet (1.8 m) tall and weighed 190 pounds (86 kg). Because of his wartime service, he was nearly 24 when he was signed by Cincinnati in 1948. He had one year of minor league experience, with the 1948 Columbia Reds of the Class A Sally League, and batted .298 before becoming a member of the Major League Reds in 1949. He was the Reds' regular center fielder that season, but he batted only .230 with limited home run power, and was a reserve outfielder for the 1950–1951 Reds before being called back into military service from the reserves as a Marine pilot.

He served in Korea from January to August 1953 at K-3 in Pohang with the 1st Marine Air Wing and flew 87 combat missions in a Grumman F9F Panther jet fighter.On one mission, his Panther was damaged by anti-aircraft fire, resulting in a crash landing. Merriman walked away unhurt.

He returned to the Majors in 1954 and batted a career-high .268 in limited service before closing out his MLB career in 1955 playing for both Chicago clubs.

In retirement, he operated an insurance business and raised and trained horses in his native California. He died at 79 in Fresno, California.

Merriman was enshrined in the Stanford Athletics Hall of Fame as a baseball player in 1954. He was also inducted in the Clovis Unified School District Hall of Fame on November 4, 2017.
