= Hank Harris (American football) =

American football player (1923–1999)

No. 36, 35, 38
- Positions: Guard, tackle

Personal information
- Born: February 26, 1923; Camden, Alabama, U.S.
- Died: February 18, 1999 (aged 75); Birmingham, Alabama, U.S.
- Listed height: 6 ft 0 in (1.83 m)
- Listed weight: 265 lb (120 kg)

Career information
- College: Texas (1940-1942, 1946)
- NFL draft: 1947: 8th round, 59th overall pick

Career history
- Washington Redskins (1947–1948); Wilmington Clippers (1948)

Awards and highlights
- 1943 Cotton Bowl Classic champion

Career NFL statistics
- Games played: 12
- Games started: 2
- Fumble recoveries: 1
- Stats at Pro Football Reference

Henry Franklin Harris (February 26, 1923 – February 18, 1999) was an American professional football player who was a guard in the National Football League (NFL) for the Washington Redskins and in the American Football League (AFL) for the Wilmington Clippers. He played college football at the University of Texas and was drafted in the eighth round of the 1947 NFL draft.

Harris, known as "Hank" or "Demp", was born in Camden, Alabama and played high school football at Wilcox Central High School in Camden.

He enrolled at the University of Texas in 1940, where he would play football for three seasons before leaving. In 1941, the team finished ranked #4 (and won the statistical National Championship according to Berryman QPRS). In 1942, the team won the Southwest Conference Championship and the 1943 Cotton Bowl Classic to finish ranked #11.

He left school for World War II where he served in Company C of the U.S. Army's 365th Medical Battalion. During World War II, the 365th was part of the Army's 65th Infantry Division. They landed in Le Havre, France in early 1945 and spent the spring fighting in Germany and into Austria before eventually linking up with Russian forces in Erlauf at the end of the war in May. For his service, Harris was awarded two Bronze Stars.

He returned to Texas to letter for a 3rd year, helping the Longhorns finished the season ranked #15.

He was drafted by the Washington Redskins in the eighth round (#59 overall) of the 1947 NFL Draft and played for them for all of the 1947 season and part of the 1948 season. He left the Redskins and finished out his career with the Wilmington Clippers of the minor league AFL. The Clippers finished the season with a loss in the League Championship game.

He died in a Birmingham hospital on February 18, 1999.
