= 1946 Michigan State Spartans football team =

American college football season

1946 Michigan State Spartans football
- Conference: Independent
- Record: 5–5
- Head coach: Charlie Bachman (13th season)
- MVP: George Guerre
- Captains: Kenneth E. Balge; Robert B. McCurry
- Home stadium: Macklin Field

1946 Midwestern major college football independents records
	Conf.			Overall
Team	W	L	T	W		L		T
No. 1 Notre Dame		–		8	–	0	–	1
Cincinnati		–		9	–	2	–	0
Detroit		–		6	–	4	–	0
Michigan State		–		5	–	5	–	0
Marquette		–		4	–	5	–	0
Rankings from AP Poll

The 1946 Michigan State Spartans football team was an American football team that represented Michigan State College as an independent during the 1946 college football season. In their 13th and final season under head coach Charlie Bachman, the Spartans compiled a 5–5 record and were outscored by a total of 202 to 181. The 1946 Spartans lost their annual rivalry game with Michigan by a 55 to 7 score. In intersectional play, the Spartans beat Penn State (19–16), Maryland (26–14), and Washington State (26–20), but lost to Boston College (34–20), Mississippi State (6–0), and Kentucky (39–14).

George Guerre led Michigan State, ranked 13th nationally with 633 rushing yards, and averaged 7.03 rushing yards per carry.

Michigan State was ranked at No. 51 in the final Litkenhous Difference by Score System rankings for 1946.

In mid-December 1946, Michigan State hired Biggie Munn to replace Bachman as head coach.

== Schedule ==
Date	Opponent	Site	Result	Attendance	Source
September 28	Wayne	Macklin Field; East Lansing, MI	W 42–0	19,106	
October 5	Boston College	Macklin Field; East Lansing, MI	L 20–34	21,015	
October 12	Mississippi State	Macklin Field; East Lansing, MI	L 0–6	22,000	
October 19	at Penn State	New Beaver Field; State College, PA (rivalry)	W 19–16	20,000	
October 26	Cincinnati	Macklin Field; East Lansing, MI	L 7–18	22,524	
November 2	at Kentucky	McLean Stadium; Lexington, KY	L 14–39	19,700	
November 9	at No. 11 Michigan	Michigan Stadium; Ann Arbor, MI (rivalry)	L 7–55	76,373	
November 16	Marquette^{†}	Macklin Field; East Lansing, MI	W 20–0	21,441	
November 23	Maryland	Macklin Field; East Lansing, MI	W 26–14	16,239	
November 30	Washington State	Macklin Field; East Lansing, MI	W 26–20	19,691	
^{†}Homecoming; Rankings from AP Poll released prior to the game

== Game summaries ==
=== Michigan ===
Week 7: Michigan State at Michigan

Team	1	2	3	4	Total
Michigan State	0	0	7	0	7
• Michigan	14	14	13	14	55

- Date: November 9, 1946
- Location: Michigan Stadium
  Ann Arbor, MI
- Game attendance: 77,134
- Referee: Lyle Clarno (Bradley)

On November 9, 1946, Michigan State lost to Michigan by a score of 55 to 7. With attendance at 77,134, the game drew the largest crowd to that date in the history of the Michigan–Michigan State football rivalry. Michigan scored twice in each quarter. Michigan State's touchdown came on a pass from Horace Smith to Frank Waters covering 77 yards in the third quarter. Michigan gained 500 yards in the game, 293 on the ground and 207 in the air. Michigan was held to 212 yards of which only 47 yards were gained by rushing.

== After the season ==
The 1947 NFL Draft was held on December 16, 1946. The following Spartans were selected.

Round	Pick	Player	Position	NFL Club
13	106	Walt Vezmar	Guard	Detroit Lions
21	195	Russ Reader	Defensive back	Chicago Bears
