= Denny Crawford =

American football player (1921–2005)

No. 38
- Positions: Guard, tackle

Personal information
- Born: June 16, 1921; Kingsport, Tennessee, U.S.
- Died: August 14, 2005 (aged 84); Kingsport, Tennessee, U.S.
- Listed height: 6 ft 0 in (1.83 m)
- Listed weight: 210 lb (95 kg)

Career information
- High school: Dobyns-Bennett (Kingsport)
- College: Tennessee (1942, 1946-1947)
- NFL draft: 1947: 15th round, 130th overall pick

Career history
- New York Yankees (1948)

Career AAFC statistics
- Games played: 8
- Games started: 6
- Stats at Pro Football Reference

Denver Junior Crawford (June 16, 1921 – August 14, 2005) was a professional American football guard. He played at the University of Tennessee including the 1943 Sugar Bowl. He lettered at Tennessee in 1942, 1946 and 1947 where he was elected team captain as a senior. In the 1947 Vanderbilt game Denny flattened three Vanderbilt Commodores with a devastating block, springing Hal Littleford for a 65-yard punt return touchdown. While serving in the military in World War II, he played service football for the 1944 Maxwell Field Marauders and the 1945 AAFTC Skymasters. He played in the 1944, 1945 and 1947 Blue-Gray Game and was a member of the 1948 College All-Stars. Originally a tackle drafted out of Tennessee by the Green Bay Packers he chose to play in the rival AAFC when they offered to double his contract salary. He was a member of the New York Yankees of the All-America Football Conference. After his playing career, Denny spent 13 years coaching college football at Washington and Lee, Maryland, Mississippi State, and Minnesota. After moving back to his hometown he spent several years as a coach at Sullivan Central High School, Blountville, TN.
