= Al Satterfield =

American football player (1921–1989)

No. 48
- Position: Tackle

Personal information
- Born: November 28, 1921; Belleville, Arkansas, U.S.
- Died: October 28, 1989 (aged 67); Little Rock, Arkansas, U.S.
- Listed height: 6 ft 3 in (1.91 m)
- Listed weight: 225 lb (102 kg)

Career information
- High school: Russellville (AR)
- College: Vanderbilt
- NFL draft: 1947: 8th round, 61st overall pick

Career history
- San Francisco 49ers (1947)

Career AAFC statistics
- Games played: 12
- Stats at Pro Football Reference

Al Satterfield (November 28, 1921 – October 28, 1989) was an American football tackle. He was drafted by the Philadelphia Eagles in the eighth round (61st overall) of the 1947 NFL Draft. He played for the San Francisco 49ers in 1947.
