= Harlan Wetz =

American football player (1925–1983)

No. 48
- Position: Tackle

Personal information
- Born: September 15, 1925; New Braunfels, Texas, U.S.
- Died: November 14, 1983 (aged 58); San Antonio, Texas, U.S.
- Listed height: 6 ft 5 in (1.96 m)
- Listed weight: 265 lb (120 kg)

Career information
- High school: New Braunfels
- College: Texas
- NFL draft: 1947: 6th round, 45th overall pick

Career history
- Brooklyn Dodgers (1947)

Career AAFC statistics
- Games played: 11
- Stats at Pro Football Reference

Harlan Wetz (September 15, 1925 – November 14, 1983) was an American football tackle. He was drafted by the Chicago Bears in the sixth round (45th overall) of the 1947 NFL Draft. He played for the Brooklyn Dodgers in 1947.
