= Herb Shoener =

American football player (1923–1985)

No. 84, 12
- Positions: End, defensive end

Personal information
- Born: January 2, 1923; Reedsville, West Virginia, U.S.
- Died: December 24, 1985 (aged 62); Anaheim, California, U.S.
- Listed height: 6 ft 3 in (1.91 m)
- Listed weight: 205 lb (93 kg)

Career information
- High school: Charleston (Charleston, West Virginia)
- College: Iowa; Lehigh
- NFL draft: 1947: 31st round, 286th overall pick

Career history
- Washington Redskins (1948–1949)

Career NFL statistics
- Fumble recoveries: 2
- Total touchdowns: 1
- Stats at Pro Football Reference

Herbert George Shoener (January 2, 1923 – December 1985) was an American professional football end in the National Football League for the Washington Redskins. He played college football at the University of Iowa and Lehigh University and was drafted in the 31st round of the 1947 NFL draft.
