= Gene Wilson (American football) =

American football player (1926–2002)

No. 65
- Position: Back

Personal information
- Born: June 24, 1926; Arp, Texas, U.S.
- Died: July 4, 2002 (aged 76); Houston, Texas, U.S.
- Listed height: 5 ft 10 in (1.78 m)
- Listed weight: 178 lb (81 kg)

Career information
- College: SMU
- NFL draft: 1947: 6th round, 40th overall pick

Career history
- Green Bay Packers (1947–1948)

Awards and highlights
- 2× First-team All-SWC (1945, 1946)

Career NFL statistics
- Receptions: 5
- Receiving yards: 57
- Interceptions: 2
- Stats at Pro Football Reference

Ollie Eugene Wilson (June 24, 1926 – July 4, 2002) was a defensive back in the National Football League (NFL). He was selected by the Green Bay Packers in the sixth round of the 1947 NFL draft and played two seasons with the team.
