= L. G. Carmody =

American football player and coach (1922–1997)

Biographical details
- Born: 1922; Nebraska, U.S.
- Died: 1997 (aged 74–75)
- Education: Columbia (master's)

Playing career
- 1946: Central Washington
- 1947: Long Island Indians
- Position: Back

Coaching career (HC unless noted)
- 1950–1954: Central Washington

Head coaching record
- Overall: 10–29–1

L. G. "'Clayton" "Clipper" Carmody (1922–1997) was an American football player and coach. He was drafted by the Washington Redskins of the National Football League (NFL) in 1947. Carmody served as the head football coach at Central Washington University from 1950 to 1954, compiling a record of 10–29–1, after having been a professor at the University of Washington.

== Head coaching record ==
Year	Team	Overall	Conference	Standing	Bowl/playoffs
Central Washington Wildcats (Evergreen Conference) (1950–1954)
1950	Central Washington	1–7–1	1–4–1	T–6th	
1951	Central Washington	1–6	1–4	T–4th	
1952	Central Washington	4–4	2–4	5th	
1953	Central Washington	2–6	2–4	T–5th	
1954	Central Washington	2–6	2–4	5th	
Central Washington:		10–29–1	8–20–1		
Total:		10–29–1			
