= Cal Rossi =

American football player (1924–2013)

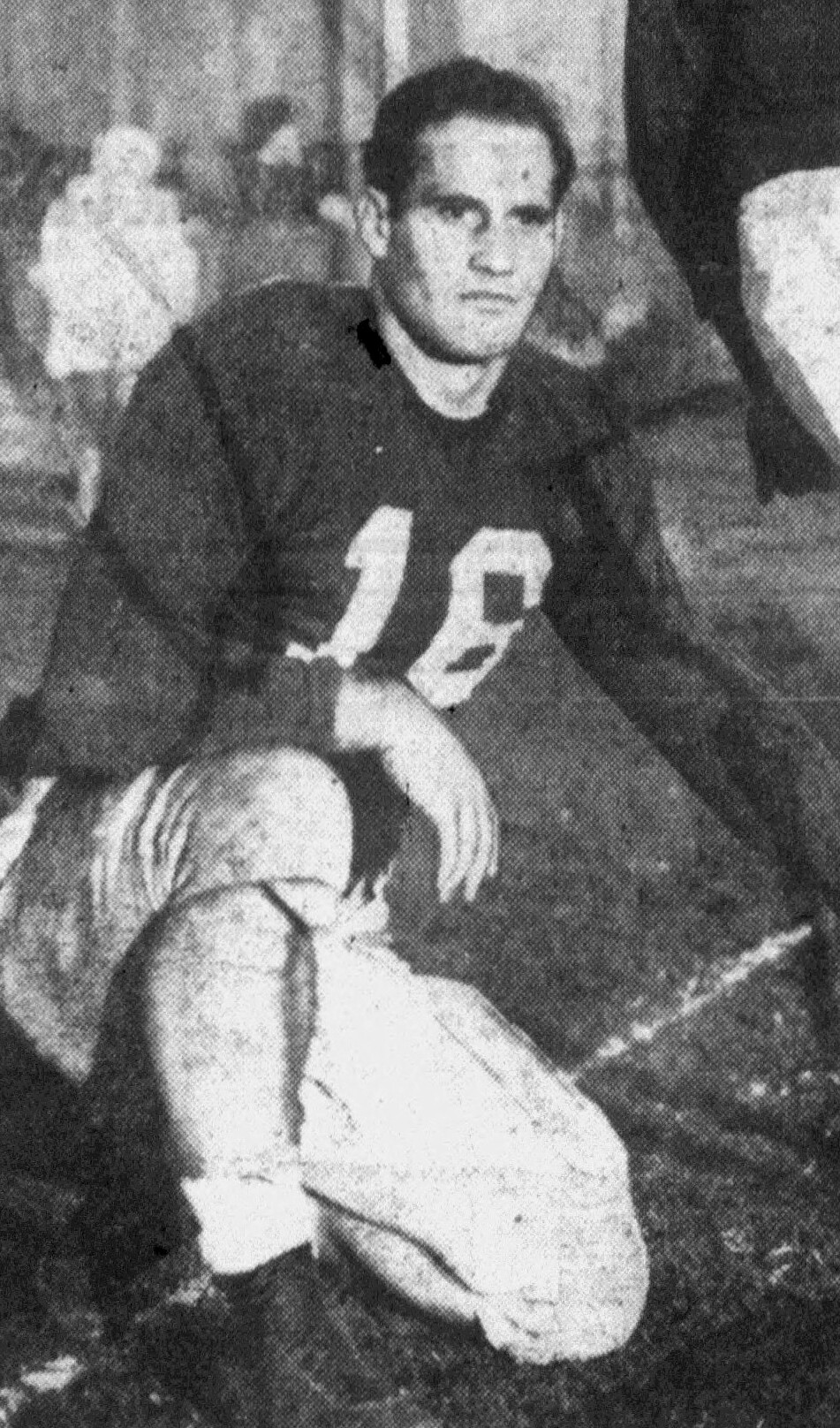
- Rossi, circa 1946

No. 16
- Position: Running back/Defensive back

Personal information
- Born: March 14, 1924; Los Altos Hills, California, U.S.
- Died: January 23, 2013 (age 88)
- Listed height: 5 ft 10 in (1.78 m)
- Listed weight: 175 lb (79 kg)

Career information
- High school: Santa Barbara (CA)
- College: UCLA (1944–1947)

Awards and highlights
- First-team All-PCC (1945); 2× Second-team All-PCC (1946, 1947); UCLA Bruins Hall of Fame (1997)

Calvin Rossi (March 14, 1924 – January 23, 2013) was an American football running back who played at the University of California, Los Angeles.

== College career ==
Rossi played college football at the University of California, Los Angeles as a halfback and defensive back. During his career, he rushed for 1,490 yards on 255 carries, which put him third on the all-time list. His career rushing average of 5.85 yards per carry was the highest in school history at the time. In addition, Rossi's 169 rushing yards against the University of Oregon in 1945 stood as a school record for 15 years. He ended his career with seven interceptions, including a team-leading three picks in 1947.

Rossi was the second leading rusher in the nation before being transferred to the Naval Corps Supply School at Harvard University as part of his military service requirements.

Rossi also played baseball in college. He hit .456 in 1945 and won All-Coast honors and hit above .300 in two other seasons.

He was the first football player to be selected twice in the NFL draft. He was first drafted in the first round (ninth overall) of the 1946 NFL draft by the Washington Redskins. This is considered to be one of the biggest blunders in NFL draft history because Rossi was a junior, and was not draft eligible. He was again chosen in the first round of the 1947 NFL draft by the Redskins, but he never played football professionally.

Rossi was inducted into the UCLA Bruins Hall of Fame in 1997.

== Coaching and teaching career ==
Rossi's first teaching and coaching assignment was at Visalia High School. Next, he moved to Redondo Beach, where he taught business classes and coached at Redondo Beach High School. It was there that he eventually became an advocate for teachers' rights through his work with the California Teachers Association.

In 1971, Rossi moved his family to Los Altos Hills, California, where he continued working for CTA, and his work focused on higher education. He retired from his position as Deputy Executive Director of CTA in 1984.

== Death ==
In later life, Rossi suffered from Alzheimer's disease. He died on January 23, 2013, at the age of 88. Team members of the Visalia Union High School football team Rossi coached in 1949 created a Cal Rossi Memorial Scholarship in his honor.
