= Jerry McCarthy =

American baseball player (1923–1965)

- First baseman
- Born: May 23, 1923; Brooklyn, New York, U.S.
- Died: October 3, 1965 (aged 42); Oceanside, New York, U.S.
- Batted: Left Threw: Left

MLB debut
- June 19, 1948, for the St. Louis Browns

Last MLB appearance
- June 23, 1948, for the St. Louis Browns

MLB statistics
- Games played: 2
- At bats: 3
- Hit(s): 1
- Stats at Baseball Reference

Teams
- St. Louis Browns (1948)

Jerome Francis McCarthy (May 23, 1923 – October 3, 1965) was an American Major League Baseball first baseman who played for the St. Louis Browns in 1948. McCarthy was born in Brooklyn, New York, on May 23, 1923. He entered the University of Pennsylvania in 1941.

McCarthy played varsity football as a sophomore, but then left school to serve in the United States Army Air Corps from 1943 until 1945. When he returned to Penn in 1946, he rejoined the varsity football team as a lineman, and served as captain. He also played first base on Penn's varsity baseball team, serving as its captain in 1948. McCarthy was honored by his senior class as Bowl Man.

After graduation, McCarthy was signed by the St. Louis Browns as an amateur free agent. He made his major league baseball debut on June 19, 1948, as a first baseman with the Browns. He played only the one season.

McCarthy later became an advertising salesman for the Army Times Publishing Co., in New York City. He was living in Freeport, Long Island, at the time of his death in Oceanside, New York, on October 3, 1965.
