= Ed Ecker =

American football player (1923–1990)

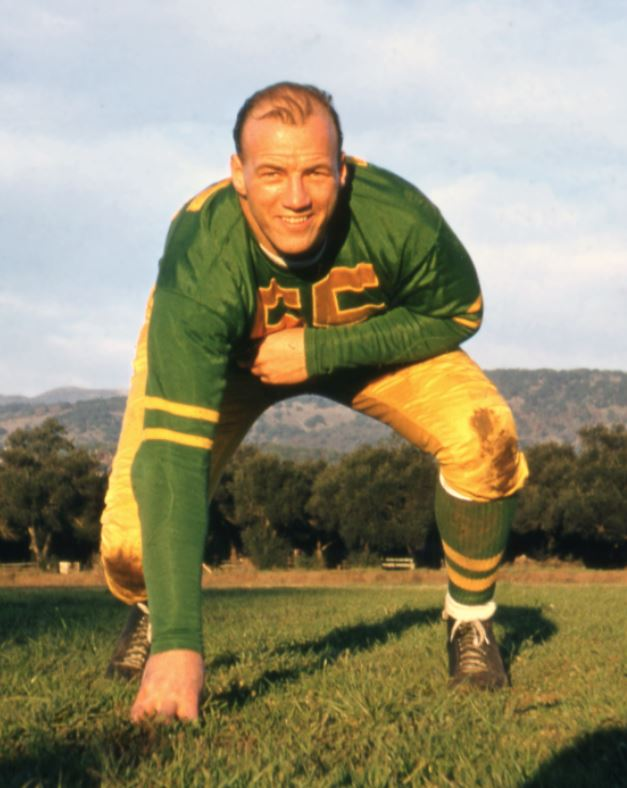

No. 55, 75, 22, 46
- Positions: Tackle, defensive tackle

Personal information
- Born: January 21, 1923; Cleveland, Ohio, U.S.
- Died: January 4, 1990 (aged 66); Burbank, California, U.S.
- Listed height: 6 ft 7 in (2.01 m)
- Listed weight: 306 lb (139 kg)

Career information
- High school: St. Ignatius (Cleveland)
- College: John Carroll (1940-1942)
- NFL draft: 1945: undrafted

Career history
- Chicago Bears (1947–1949); Chicago Rockets (1948); Green Bay Packers (1950–1951); Washington Redskins (1952)

Career NFL/AAFC statistics
- Games played: 48
- Games started: 14
- Fumble recoveries: 2
- Stats at Pro Football Reference

Enrique Edward Ecker (January 21, 1923 – January 4, 1990), most commonly known as Ed Ecker, was an American football player who was a tackle in the National Football League (NFL) and All-America Football Conference (AAFC) for seven seasons during the late 1940s and early 1950s. He played college football for John Carroll University, and signed with the NFL's Chicago Bears in 1946 and played parts of four seasons. He also played for the AAFC's Chicago Rockets in 1948, and the NFL's Green Bay Packers in 1950 and 1951. He finished his career with the NFL's Washington Redskins in 1952. In his seven-season pro career, he played in 60 regular season games. He was the largest player in the NFL during that time. As was typical of his era of football, he played on both offense and defense.

== Acting career ==
Because of his size and imposing presence, Ecker also acted. For instance, he played an arsonist in the Peter Gunn TV series (season 1, episode 12, aired December 8, 1958, titled "The Torch").
