= Weldon Edwards (American football) =

American football player (1924–1988)

No. 48
- Position: Tackle

Personal information
- Born: April 15, 1924; Comanche, Texas, U.S.
- Died: May 6, 1988 (aged 64); Tulsa, Oklahoma, U.S.
- Listed height: 6 ft 0 in (1.83 m)
- Listed weight: 225 lb (102 kg)

Career information
- High school: Comanche
- College: TCU (1942, 1946-1947); Texas-Arlington (1943)
- NFL draft: 1947: 14th round, 19th overall pick

Career history
- Washington Redskins (1948)

Awards and highlights
- First-team All-SWC (1946); Second-team All-SWC (1947)

Career NFL statistics
- Games played: 5
- Stats at Pro Football Reference

Weldon Bertrand Edwards (April 15, 1924 – May 6, 1988) was an American professional football offensive tackle in the National Football League (NFL) for the Washington Redskins. He played college football at Texas Christian University and was selected in the fourteenth round of the 1947 NFL draft.
