= Hubert Shurtz =

American football player (1923–2000)

No. 89
- Position: Tackle

Personal information
- Born: July 1, 1923; Pinckneyville, Illinois, U.S.
- Died: September 12, 2000 (aged 77); Destrehan, Louisiana, U.S.
- Listed height: 6 ft 3 in (1.91 m)
- Listed weight: 235 lb (107 kg)

Career information
- High school: Pinckneyville
- College: LSU (1946-1947)
- NFL draft: 1947: 17th round, 142nd overall pick

Career history
- Pittsburgh Steelers (1948)

Career NFL statistics
- Games played: 12
- Games started: 1
- Fumble recoveries: 1
- Stats at Pro Football Reference

Hubert Dean Shurtz (July 1, 1923 – September 12, 2000) was an American professional football player who played tackle in the National Football League (NFL) for one season with the Pittsburgh Steelers. He was drafted by the Philadelphia Eagles in the 17th round of the 1947 NFL draft but did not play for the team. He attended Louisiana State University, where he played college football for the LSU Tigers football team. Shurtz played in 12 games for the Steelers in 1948, starting in one of them, and he had one fumble recovery.
