= George Hekkers =

American football player (1923–2008)

No. 35, 44, 42, 34, 70
- Position: Tackle

Personal information
- Born: February 18, 1923; Milwaukee, Wisconsin, U.S.
- Died: February 6, 2008 (aged 84); Waukesha, Wisconsin, U.S.
- Listed height: 6 ft 4 in (1.93 m)
- Listed weight: 241 lb (109 kg)

Career information
- High school: Washington (Milwaukee)
- College: Wisconsin (1941-1942)
- NFL draft: 1946: undrafted

Career history
- Los Angeles Bulldogs (1946); Miami Seahawks (1946); Baltimore Colts (1947); Detroit Lions (1947–1949)

Career NFL/AAFC statistics
- Games played: 41
- Games started: 15
- Stats at Pro Football Reference

George Hekkers (February 18, 1923 – February 6, 2008) was an American football player in the National Football League for the Detroit Lions, and the Baltimore Colts from 1947 to 1949 as a tackle. Previously, he played with the Miami Seahawks of the All-America Football Conference in 1946. He played at the collegiate level for the University of Wisconsin–Madison.

== See also ==
- List of Detroit Lions players
