= Russ Reader =

American football player (1923–1995)

No. 11, 56
- Position: Defensive back

Personal information
- Born: June 26, 1923; Ypsilanti, Michigan, U.S.
- Died: August 11, 1995 (aged 72); Lansing, Michigan, U.S.
- Listed height: 6 ft 0 in (1.83 m)
- Listed weight: 185 lb (84 kg)

Career information
- High school: Dearborn (Dearborn, Michigan)
- College: Michigan; Michigan State
- NFL draft: 1947: 21st round, 195th overall pick

Career history
- Chicago Bears (1947); Toronto Argonauts (1949)

Career NFL statistics
- Games played: 2
- Stats at Pro Football Reference

Russell "Big Daddy" Reader Jr. (June 26, 1923 – August 12, 1995) was an American gridiron football player. Reader was born in Ypsilanti, Michigan and graduated from Dearborn High School in Dearborn, Michigan. After graduating from Dearborn High School, Reader enrolled at the University of Michigan where he was a member of Fritz Crisler's 1941 Michigan Wolverines football team. After World War II, Reader enrolled at Michigan State University and played at the halfback position for the Spartans football team in 1945 and 1946. Reader was considered a triple-threat player, as he handled rushing, passing and kicking duties for the Spartans. In November 1945, he led the Spartans to a 33–0 win over the Penn State Nittany Lions, as he threw two touchdown passes and also caught a touchdown pass. He was drafted by the Chicago Bears in the 21st round (195th overall pick) in the 1947 NFL draft. Simkus played in two games for the Bears in the 1947 NFL season, and began the 1948 season with the Bears as an understudy for Sid Luckman at the quarterback position. He was also a renowned swimmer and diver. He started the 1949 season with the Toronto Argonauts in the Canadian Football League and finished the season playing for the Windsor Bulldogs in the Canadian American Football League. Reader died in 1995 at age 72 while living in Milford, Michigan.
