= Walt Vezmar =

American football player (1925–1981)

No. 33
- Position: Guard

Personal information
- Born: January 1, 1925; Detroit, Michigan, U.S.
- Died: May 28, 1981 (aged 56); Pollock, Louisiana, U.S.
- Listed height: 5 ft 11 in (1.80 m)
- Listed weight: 235 lb (107 kg)

Career information
- High school: Northeastern (Detroit)
- College: Michigan State (1945)
- NFL draft: 1947: 13th round, 106th overall pick

Career history
- Detroit Lions (1946–1947)

Career NFL statistics
- Games played: 13
- Fumble recoveries: 3
- Stats at Pro Football Reference

Walter Vezmar (January 1, 1925 – May 28, 1981) was an American professional football player.

Vezmar was born in Detroit in 1925 and attended Northeastern High School. He served in the Army during World War II. He sustained a head injury while serving with the Ranger during the Battle of Anzio in 1944.

After the war, he played college football for Michigan State. During a game in November 1945, he aggravated his wartime head injury and was advised by doctors to quit the game. He was also declared academically ineligible and signed with the Detroit Lions in June 1946. He appeared in 11 games for the Lions 1946 at age 21 and also appeared in two games in 1947. He was Rookie of the Year with the Lions. In 1948 and 1949, he played for the Paterson Panthers of the American Football League.

He also played for the New York Yaks in 1949. In 1951, he enlisted in the Air Force. He later became a minister with the Baptist church. He died in 1981 in Pollock, Louisiana.
