= 1947 Los Angeles Rams season =

NFL team season

- Head coach: Bob Snyder
- Home stadium: Los Angeles Memorial Coliseum

Results
- Record: 6–6
- Division place: 4th NFL Western
- Playoffs: Did not qualify

The 1947 Los Angeles Rams season was the team's tenth year with the National Football League and the second season in Los Angeles.

== Before the season ==
=== Draft ===
1947 Los Angeles Rams draft
Round	Pick	Player	Position	College	Notes
1	9	Herman Wedemeyer	B	St. Mary's	
3	21	Don Paul *	LB	UCLA	Played for Rams beginning in 1948
5	33	Gordon Gray	B	USC	
6	43	Paul Evanson	T	Oregon State	
7	53	Bill Smyth	DE	Penn State	
8	63	Bill McGovern	C	Washington	
9	73	Max Partin	B	Tennessee	
10	83	Carl Samuelson	DT	Nebraska	
11	93	Russ Steger	B	Illinois	
12	103	Dante Lavelli * ^{†}	E	Ohio State	A member of the Cleveland Browns
13	113	Mike Dimitro	G	UCLA	
14	123	John Kissell	DT	Boston College	
15	133	George Fuchs	B	Wisconsin	
16	143	Ralph Chubb	B	Michigan	
17	153	Don Hardy	E	USC	
18	163	Ed Champagne	T	LSU	
19	173	Jim Dewar	B	Indiana	Signed with Cleveland Browns (AAFC)
20	183	Ben Reiges	B	UCLA	Signed with the Los Angeles Bulldogs (PCFL)
21	193	Leon McLaughlin *	C	UCLA	Played with Rams beginning in 1951
22	203	Charlie Elliott	T	Oregon	Signed with New York Yankees (AAFC)
23	213	Lou Levanti	C	Illinois	
24	223	J. D. Cheek	T	Oklahoma A&M	
25	233	Bob Dal Porto	B	California	
26	243	Gene Standefer	B	Texas Tech	
27	253	Bob David	G	Villanova	
28	263	Jim Hunnicutt	G	South Carolina	
29	273	John Comer	B	Holy Cross	
30	283	Hal Dean	G	Ohio State	
31	291	James Atwell	B	South Carolina	
32	299	Bob Prymuski	G	Illinois	
Made roster † Pro Football Hall of Fame * Made at least one Pro Bowl during career

== Schedule ==
Week	Date	Opponent	Result	Record	Venue	Attendance	Game recap
1	Bye						
2	September 29	at Pittsburgh Steelers	**W** 48–7	1–0	Forbes Field	35,658	Recap
3	October 5	at **Green Bay Packers**	**L** 14–17	1–1	Wisconsin State Fair Park	31,613	Recap
4	October 12	at **Detroit Lions**	**W** 27–13	2–1	Briggs Stadium	42,955	Recap
5	October 19	**Chicago Cardinals**	**W** 27–7	3–1	Los Angeles Memorial Coliseum	69,631	Recap
6	October 26	at Philadelphia Eagles	**L** 7–14	3–2	Shibe Park	36,364	Recap
7	November 2	at **Chicago Cardinals**	**L** 10–17	3–3	Comiskey Park	40,075	Recap
8	November 9	Boston Yanks	**L** 16–27	3–4	Los Angeles Memorial Coliseum	19,715	Recap
9	November 16	**Chicago Bears**	**L** 21–41	3–5	Los Angeles Memorial Coliseum	36,702	Recap
10	November 23	**Detroit Lions**	**W** 28–17	4–5	Los Angeles Memorial Coliseum	17,693	Recap
11	November 30	**Green Bay Packers**	**L** 10–30	4–6	Los Angeles Memorial Coliseum	31,080	Recap
12	December 7	at **Chicago Bears**	**W** 17–14	5–6	Wrigley Field	34,215	Recap
13	December 14	New York Giants	**W** 34–10	6–6	Los Angeles Memorial Coliseum	24,050	Recap
Note: Intra-division opponents are in **bold** text.

== Standings ==
NFL Western Division
	W	L	T	PCT	DIV	PF	PA	STK
Chicago Cardinals	9	3	0	.750	7–1	306	231	W2
Chicago Bears	8	4	0	.667	4–4	363	241	L2
Green Bay Packers	6	5	1	.545	5–3	274	210	L1
Los Angeles Rams	6	6	0	.500	4–4	259	214	W2
Detroit Lions	3	9	0	.250	0–8	231	305	L3

Note: Tie games were not officially counted in the standings until 1972.

== Roster ==
1947 Los Angeles Rams roster
Backs: 33 Jack Banta RB/CB; 34 Mel Bleeker RB/CB; 9 Gerard Cowhig FB/OLB; 18 Fred Gehrke CB/RB/K; 21 Jim Hardy QB/S/P; 98 Tom Harmon S/RB; 12 Les Horvath RB; 26 John Ksionzyk QB; 3 Dante Magnani RB; 13 Kenny Washington RB/CB; 7 Bob Waterfield QB/CB/K/P; 50 Jack Wilson RB/CB; Receivers: 49 Jim Benton; 53 Red Hickey; 30 Steve Pritko; 42 Jack Zilly DE/WR	Linemen/Linebackers: 66 Gil Bouley DT/T; 86 Ed Champagne T/MG; 77 Bob David G/MLB; 84 Hal Dean G; 43 Roger Eason G; 58 Jack Finlay OLB/K; 44 Ray Hamilton DE/WR; 16 Bob Hoffman OLB/FB; 46 Bud Hubbell DE/WR; 20 Dick Huffman T/DT; 8 Clyde Johnson T/DT; 27 Milan Lazetich G/MG; 23 Jack Martin OLB/C; 11 Riley Matheson DE/WR; 22 Fred Naumetz C/OLB; 40 Elbie Schultz DT/T; 79 Bill Smyth T/WR; 36 Pat West MLB/FB	Reserve list: 31 Dick Hoerner FB/LB (IR); 60 Bob Shaw DE/WR (IR); rookies in italics
