= 1946 Georgia Tech Yellow Jackets football team =

American college football season

1946 Georgia Tech Yellow Jackets football

Oil Bowl champion

Oil Bowl, W 41–19 vs. Saint Mary's
- Conference: Southeastern Conference

Ranking
- AP: No. 11
- Record: 9–2 (4–2 SEC)
- Head coach: Bobby Dodd (2nd season)
- Captain: Bob Davis
- Home stadium: Grant Field

1946 Southeastern Conference football standings
| | Conf. | | | | | Overall |
| Team | W | | L | | T | W | | L | | T |
|---|---|---|---|---|---|---|---|---|---|---|
| No. 3 Georgia + | 5 | – | 0 | – | 0 | 11 | – | 0 | – | 0 |
| No. 7 Tennessee + | 5 | – | 0 | – | 0 | 9 | – | 2 | – | 0 |
| No. 8 LSU | 5 | – | 1 | – | 0 | 9 | – | 1 | – | 1 |
| No. 11 Georgia Tech | 4 | – | 2 | – | 0 | 9 | – | 2 | – | 0 |
| Mississippi State | 3 | – | 2 | – | 0 | 8 | – | 2 | – | 0 |
| Alabama | 4 | – | 3 | – | 0 | 7 | – | 4 | – | 0 |
| Vanderbilt | 3 | – | 4 | – | 0 | 5 | – | 4 | – | 0 |
| Kentucky | 2 | – | 3 | – | 0 | 7 | – | 3 | – | 0 |
| Tulane | 2 | – | 4 | – | 0 | 3 | – | 7 | – | 0 |
| Auburn | 1 | – | 5 | – | 0 | 4 | – | 6 | – | 0 |
| Ole Miss | 1 | – | 6 | – | 0 | 2 | – | 7 | – | 0 |
| Florida | 0 | – | 5 | – | 0 | 0 | – | 9 | – | 0 |
$ – Conference champion; Rankings from AP Poll

The 1946 Georgia Tech Yellow Jackets football team was an American football team that represented the Georgia Institute of Technology in the Southeastern Conference (SEC) during the 1946 college football season. In their second season under head coach Bobby Dodd, the Yellow Jackets compiled a 9–2 record (4–2 against SEC opponents) and outscored all opponents by a total of 284 to 127. They were ranked No. 11 in the final AP Poll and defeated the Saint Mary's Gaels in the 1947 Oil Bowl.

Five Georgia Tech players received honors from the Associated Press or United Press on the 1946 All-SEC football team: center Paul Duke (AP-1, UP-1); quarterback Frank Broyles (AP-1, UP-2); tackle Bob Davis (AP-1, UP-2); guard Bill Healy (UP-1); and fullback George Matthews (UP-3).

== Schedule ==
| Date | Opponent | Rank | Site | Result | Attendance | Source |
|---|---|---|---|---|---|---|
| September 28 | at Tennessee | | Shields–Watkins Field; Knoxville, TN (rivalry) | L 9–13 | 36,000 | |
| October 5 | VMI* | | Grant Field; Atlanta, GA | W 32–6 | 25,000 | |
| October 12 | Ole Miss | | Grant Field; Atlanta, GA | W 24–7 | 25,000 | |
| October 19 | at No. 12 LSU | | Tiger Stadium; Baton Rouge, LA | W 26–7 | 30,000 | |
| October 26 | Auburn | No. 15 | Grant Field; Atlanta, GA (rivalry) | W 27–6 | 30,000 | |
| November 2 | at No. 19 Duke* | No. 16 | Duke Stadium; Durham, NC | W 14–0 | 38,000 | |
| November 9 | Navy* | No. 8 | Grant Field; Atlanta, GA | W 28–20 | 32,000 | |
| November 16 | Tulane | No. 7 | Grant Field; Atlanta, GA | W 35–7 | 32,000 | |
| November 23 | Furman* | No. 6 | Grant Field; Atlanta, GA | W 41–7 | 17,000 | |
| November 30 | at No. 3 Georgia | No. 7 | Sanford Stadium; Athens, GA (Clean, Old-Fashioned Hate) | L 7–35 | 55,000 | |
| January 1 | vs. Saint Mary's (CA)* | No. 11 | Rice Field; Houston, TX (Oil Bowl) | W 41–19 | 22,000 | |
*Non-conference game; Rankings from AP Poll released prior to the game

== Rankings ==
Ranking movements Legend: ██ Increase in ranking ██ Decrease in ranking — = Not ranked ( ) = First-place votes
| | Week | | | | | | | | |
| Poll | 1 | 2 | 3 | 4 | 5 | 6 | 7 | 8 | Final |
|---|---|---|---|---|---|---|---|---|---|
| AP | — | — | 15 | 16 | 8 | 7 | 6 | 7 (1) | 11 |

== After the season ==
The 1947 NFL draft was held on December 16, 1946. The following Yellow Jackets were selected.

| Round | Pick | Player | Position | NFL club |
|---|---|---|---|---|
| 6 | 44 | Bob Davis | Tackle | New York Giants |
| 12 | 100 | George Hills | Guard | Green Bay Packers |
