= 1946 Nevada Wolf Pack football team =

American college football season

1946 Nevada Wolf Pack football

Shrine Benefit Aloha Bowl, W 26–7 vs. Hawaii
- Conference: Independent
- Record: 7–2
- Head coach: Jim Aiken (8th season)
- Home stadium: Mackay Stadium

1946 Western major college football independents records
	Conf.			Overall
Team	W	L	T	W		L		T
Nevada		–		7	–	2	–	0
Saint Mary's		–		6	–	3	–	0
San Francisco		–		3	–	6	–	0
Santa Clara		–		2	–	5	–	1
Portland		–		1	–	4	–	1

The 1946 Nevada Wolf Pack football team was an American football team that represented the University of Nevada as an independent during the 1946 college football season. In their eighth season under head coach Jim Aiken, the Wolf Pack compiled a 7–2 record, and defeated Hawaii, 26 to 7, in the 16th annual Shrine Benefit Aloha Bowl.

The team ranked first nationally in passing offense with an average of 198.1 passing yards per game, 25 yards more on average than the second-ranked team, Georgia. They also ranked third nationally in total offense with an average of 389.3 yards per game.

Nevada was ranked at No. 59 in the final Litkenhous Difference by Score System rankings for 1946.

In just eight games (not including Nevada's bowl game), quarterback Bill Mackrides also led the nation with 1,254 passing yards and 17 touchdown passes. His total of 1,254 passing yards on just 56 completions calculates to an average of 22.4 yards per completion. In the post-season Shrine Benefit at Aloha Bowl, Mackrides added another 189 passing yards and three touchdown passes, bringing his 1946 nine-game totals to 1,443 passing yards and 20 touchdown passes.

Mackrides, halfbacks Tommy Kalmanir and Bill Bass, end Horace Gillom, and tackle Ed Sharkey all went on to careers in professional football. Bob McClure was the team captain and also played two season in the National Football League (NFL). The team's assistant coaches were Jim Bailey, Jake Lawlor, and Dick Miller.

On January 15, 1947, Aiken resigned as athletic director and head coach and left the school to become head football coach at the University of Oregon. In eight years under Aiken, the Wolf Pack compiled a 38–26–4 record.

== Schedule ==
Date	Opponent	Site	Result	Attendance	Source
September 29	at San Francisco	Kezar Stadium; San Francisco, CA	L 14–26	30,000	
October 5	Santa Clara	Mackay Stadium; Reno, NV	W 33–7	6,000	
October 12	Arizona State	Mackay Stadium; Reno, NV	W 74–2		
October 19	at San Diego State	Balboa Stadium; San Diego, CA	W 26–0	20,000	
October 27	at Saint Mary's	Kezar Stadium; San Francisco, CA	L 12–13	50,000	
November 2	Montana State^{†}	Mackay Stadium; Reno, NV	W 38–14		
November 9	Santa Barbara	Mackay Stadium; Reno, NV	W 48–13		
November 22	vs. Loyola (CA)	Butcher Memorial Field; Las Vegas, NV	W 53–0	4,000	
December 7	at Hawaii	Honolulu Stadium; Honolulu, Territory of Hawaii (Shrine Benefit Aloha Bowl)	W 26–7	25,000	
^{†}Homecoming

== Players ==
The following individuals played for the 1946 Nevada team:

- James Aiken Jr.
- Bill Bass - halfback
- Tom Batey
- Scott Beasley - end
- Morley Bockman
- Max Dodge
- Jordan Eliades - quarterback
- Darwin Farnsworth
- Pat Francellini
- Horace Gillom - end
- Harold Hayes - end
- Pat Heher - guard
- Tommy Kalmanir - halfback
- Ted Kondel
- Bill Mackrides - guard
- Bob McClure - tackle and captain
- Mike Mirabelli
- Bill Morris - end
- Carl Robinson - guard
- Lloyd Rude - fullback
- Ed Sharkey - tackle
- Chuck Siferd
- John Simons - end
- Ken Sinofsky - guard
- Neil Sprague
- Jess Standish - fullback
- Gene Straka - fullback
- John Subda - guard
- Bob Sullivan - center
- Don Talcott - guard
- Dick Tilton - guard
- Dick Trachok
- Jim Welin - fullback

== NFL draft ==
The 1947 NFL draft was held on December 16, 1946. The following Wolf Pack players were selected.

Round	Pick	Player	Position	NFL club
3	19	Bill Mackrides	Quarterback	Philadelphia Eagles
25	229	Tommy Kalmanir	Halfback	Pittsburgh Steelers
