= 1946 Alabama Crimson Tide football team =

American college football season

1946 Alabama Crimson Tide football
- Conference: Southeastern Conference
- Record: 7–4 (4–3 SEC)
- Head coach: Frank Thomas (15th season)
- Captain: Game captains
- Home stadium: Denny Stadium; Legion Field; Cramton Bowl

1946 Southeastern Conference football standings
	Conf.					Overall
Team	W		L		T	W		L		T
No. 3 Georgia +	5	–	0	–	0	11	–	0	–	0
No. 7 Tennessee +	5	–	0	–	0	9	–	2	–	0
No. 8 LSU	5	–	1	–	0	9	–	1	–	1
No. 11 Georgia Tech	4	–	2	–	0	9	–	2	–	0
Mississippi State	3	–	2	–	0	8	–	2	–	0
Alabama	4	–	3	–	0	7	–	4	–	0
Vanderbilt	3	–	4	–	0	5	–	4	–	0
Kentucky	2	–	3	–	0	7	–	3	–	0
Tulane	2	–	4	–	0	3	–	7	–	0
Auburn	1	–	5	–	0	4	–	6	–	0
Ole Miss	1	–	6	–	0	2	–	7	–	0
Florida	0	–	5	–	0	0	–	9	–	0
$ – Conference champion; Rankings from AP Poll

The 1946 Alabama Crimson Tide football team (variously "Alabama", "UA" or "Bama") represented the University of Alabama in the 1946 college football season. It was the Crimson Tide's 52nd overall and 13th season as a member of the Southeastern Conference (SEC). The team was led by head coach Frank Thomas, in his 15th and final year, and played their home games at Denny Stadium in Tuscaloosa, Legion Field in Birmingham and at the Cramton Bowl in Montgomery. They finished with a record of seven wins and four losses (7–4 overall, 4–3 in the SEC).

After the Crimson Tide opened the season with four consecutive victories over Furman, Tulane, South Carolina and Southwestern Louisiana, Alabama's 14-game winning streak was snapped when they lost to Tennessee 12–0. One week later, the Crimson Tide faced off against Kentucky and their young new coach, Bear Bryant, and won by a score of 21–7, before they lost consecutive games to Georgia and LSU. Alabama then closed the season with a victory over Vanderbilt, a loss to Boston College in their first game ever played in New England, and an upset victory over Mississippi State on homecoming in the season finale.

Over the course of the season, Thomas was riddled with health issues that ultimately led to his resignation as head coach. In January 1947, Harold Drew was named as the 17th head coach of the Crimson Tide.

== Schedule ==
Date	Opponent	Rank	Site	Result	Attendance
September 20	Furman*		Legion Field; Birmingham, AL	W 26–7	25,000
September 28	at Tulane		Tulane Stadium; New Orleans, LA	W 7–6	64,317
October 5	at South Carolina*		Carolina Stadium; Columbia, SC	W 14–6	20,000
October 12	Southwestern Louisiana*	No. 6	Denny Stadium; Tuscaloosa, AL	W 54–0	18,000
October 19	at No. 9 Tennessee	No. 7	Shields–Watkins Field; Knoxville, TN (Third Saturday in October)	L 0–12	
October 26	Kentucky	No. 11	Cramton Bowl; Montgomery, AL	W 21–7	22,500
November 2	at No. 5 Georgia	No. 15	Sanford Stadium; Athens, GA (rivalry)	L 0–14	30,000
November 9	at No. 19 LSU		Tiger Stadium; Baton Rouge, LA (rivalry)	L 21–31	46,000
November 16	Vanderbilt		Legion Field; Birmingham, AL	W 12–7	
November 23	at Boston College*		Braves Field; Boston, MA	L 7–13	41,000
November 30	No. 19 Mississippi State^{†}		Denny Stadium; Tuscaloosa, AL (rivalry)	W 24–7	25,000
*Non-conference game; ^{†}Homecoming; Rankings from AP Poll released prior to the game

== Rankings ==
Ranking movements Legend: ██ Increase in ranking ██ Decrease in ranking — = Not ranked
	Week								
Poll	1	2	3	4	5	6	7	8	Final
AP	6	7	11	15	—	—	—	—	—

== Game summaries ==
=== Furman ===
Team	1	2	3	4	Total
Furman	7	0	0	0	7
• Alabama	6	13	7	0	26

- Date: September 20
- Location: Legion Field
  Birmingham, Alabama
- Game attendance: 25,000

To open the 1946 season, the Crimson Tide played the Furman Purple Hurricane, who fielded their first team since the 1942 season, on a Friday night at Legion Field. Against the Purple Hurricane, Alabama won 26–7 before a crowd of 25,000 in Birmingham. In the first quarter, Alabama took a 6–0 lead after Norwood Hodges intercepted a Skeeter Coyle pass and returned it 27-yards for a touchdown. On the kickoff that ensued, Charlie Truluck returned it 95-yards to give Furman a 7–6 lead. The Crimson Tide responded with a pair of second-quarter touchdowns to take a 19–7 halftime lead. The first came on a 29-yard Harry Gilmer pass to Ted Cook and the second on a six-yard Johnny August run. Alabama then scored their final points of the game in the third quarter on a 15-yard Gilmer run.

=== Tulane ===
Team	1	2	3	4	Total
• Alabama	7	0	0	0	7
Tulane	0	6	0	0	6

- Date: September 28
- Location: Tulane Stadium
  New Orleans, Louisiana
- Game attendance: 64,317

To open conference play, Alabama traveled to New Orleans and defeated the Tulane Green Wave 7–6 in what was described as a "torrential downpour" throughout the game. Alabama scored their only points on a two-yard Hal Self touchdown run in the first quarter, and Tulane scored on a 24-yard Jim Keeton pass to John Sims in the second quarter. At the time, the announced crowd of 64,317 in attendance for the game was the largest for a regular season game in the Southern United States.

=== South Carolina ===
Team	1	2	3	4	Total
• Alabama	0	7	0	7	14
South Carolina	6	0	0	0	6

- Date: October 5
- Location: Carolina Stadium
  Columbia, South Carolina
- Game attendance: 20,000

Against the South Carolina Gamecocks, Alabama won their third game of the season with this 14–6 at Carolina Stadium. The Gamecocks took a 6–0 first quarter lead after Bo Hagan threw a 42-yard touchdown pass to Earl Dunham. Alabama responded with a one-yard Hal Smith touchdown run for a 7–6 halftime lead. After a scoreless third, the Crimson Tide closed the game with a one-yard Fred Grant touchdown run for the 14–6 win.

=== Southwestern Louisiana ===
Team	1	2	3	4	Total
SW Louisiana	0	0	0	0	0
• #6 Alabama	6	14	13	21	54

- Date: October 12
- Location: Denny Stadium
  Tuscaloosa, Alabama
- Game attendance: 18,000

After they opened the season with three consecutive victories, Alabama was recognized with the No. 6 ranking in the first AP Poll for the 1946 season in the week that led to their game against the Southwestern Louisiana Institute. Against the Bulldogs, that were led by former Tide great Johnny Cain, Alabama won their fourth game of the season with their 54–0 shutout at Denny Stadium. Alabama took a 6–0 first-quarter lead after Lowell Tew scored on a 28-yard touchdown run. They extended their lead 20–0 at halftime after Johnny August threw a 15-yard touchdown pass to Bob Hood and Lionel W. Noonan scored on a three-yard run.

In the third quarter, Tew scored his second touchdown on a seven-yard run and Fred Grant scored on a three-yard run for a 34–0 lead. The Crimson Tide then concluded the afternoon with a trio of touchdowns in the fourth quarter. The touchdowns were scored on a Clem Welsh run, a 46-yard Norman Mosley punt return and an 87-yard D. Joe Gambrell reception from Theo Fakier for the 54–0 victory.

=== Tennessee ===
Third Saturday in October

Team	1	2	3	4	Total
#7 Alabama	0	0	0	0	0
• #9 Tennessee	0	6	6	0	12

- Date: October 19
- Location: Shields–Watkins Field
  Knoxville, Tennessee

Although they defeated Southwestern Louisiana in their previous game, Alabama dropped to the No. 7 position in the second AP Poll of the season. Against Tennessee, the Crimson Tide were shutout Volunteers 12–0 at Shields–Watkins Field. The Tennessee points were scored on short Bob Lund touchdown runs in the second and third quarters.

=== Kentucky ===
Team	1	2	3	4	Total
Kentucky	0	0	7	0	7
• #11 Alabama	0	14	0	7	21

- Date: October 26
- Location: Cramton Bowl
  Montgomery, Alabama
- Game attendance: 22,500

After their loss against Tennessee, Alabama dropped four spots to the No. 11 ranking prior to their game against Kentucky. In Montgomery, the Crimson Tide defeated the Wildcats 21–7 at the Cramton Bowl. After a scoreless first quarter, Alabama took a 14–0 halftime lead after touchdowns were scored on a one-yard Harry Gilmer run and on a 37-yard Gilmer pass to Hugh Morrow in the second quarter. Kentucky responded in the third with their only points when Bill Chambers intercepted a Gilmer pass and returned it 65-yards for a touchdown. The Crimson Tide then made the final score 21–7 in the fourth on an eight-yard Gilmer pass to Ted Cook.

=== Georgia ===
Team	1	2	3	4	Total
#15 Alabama	7	0	0	0	7
• #5 Georgia	7	7	0	0	14

- Date: November 2
- Location: Sanford Stadium
  Athens, Georgia
- Game attendance: 30,000

Although the Crimson Tide defeated Kentucky the previous week, Alabama dropped four spots to the No. 15 ranking for their game against Georgia. Against the Bulldogs, the Crimson Tide were shutout 14–0 before 30,000 fans at Sanford Stadium. Georgia All-American halfback Charley Trippi was responsible for both of the Bulldogs' touchdowns. The first came on a nine-yard Trippi pass to Dan Edwards and later on a 46-yard Trippi run.

=== LSU ===
Team	1	2	3	4	Total
Alabama	7	0	0	14	21
• #19 LSU	0	12	19	0	31

- Date: November 9
- Location: Tiger Stadium
  Baton Rouge, Louisiana
- Game attendance: 46,000

To open conference play for the 1945 season, the Crimson Tide traveled to play LSU and left Baton Rouge with a 26–7 victory.

=== Vanderbilt ===
Team	1	2	3	4	Total
Vanderbilt	0	0	0	7	7
• Alabama	0	12	0	0	12

- Date: November 16
- Location: Legion Field
  Birmingham, Alabama

Against the Vanderbilt Commodores, Alabama won 12–7 at Legion Field in Birmingham. After a scoreless first quarter, the Crimson Tide took a 12–0 halftime lead after touchdowns were scored in the second quarter on a short Hal Self run and a 20-yard Harry Gilmer pass to Hugh Morrow. The Commodores scored their lone touchdown late in the fourth quarter on a one-yard Robert Berry touchdown run on fourth-and-goal to make the final score 12–7.

=== Boston College ===
Team	1	2	3	4	Total
Alabama	0	7	0	0	7
• Boston College	0	7	0	6	13

- Date: November 23
- Location: Braves Field
  Boston
- Game attendance: 41,000

Against the Boston College Eagles, Alabama lost 13–7 in what was the first game ever played by the Crimson Tide in New England. After a scoreless first quarter, each team scored second-quarter touchdowns. The Eagles scored first on a one-yard James Benedetto run and Alabama responded with a 38-yard Harry Gilmer pass to Ted Cook to make the halftime score 7–7. Boston then scored the game-winning touchdown early in the final period on a 39-yard Maurice Poissant run. The game marked the first time that an Alabama squad traveled to an away game by way of airplane.

=== Mississippi State ===
Team	1	2	3	4	Total
#19 Mississippi State	0	0	0	7	7
• Alabama	0	10	7	7	24

- Date: November 30
- Location: Denny Stadium
  Tuscaloosa, Alabama
- Game attendance: 25,000

On what was both homecoming and the final game of the season at Denny Stadium, Alabama upset the Mississippi State Maroons 24–7. After a scoreless first quarter, Alabama took a 10–0 halftime lead after a six-yard Hugh Morrow field goal and a two-yard Lionel W. Noonan touchdown run in the second quarter. They extended their lead further to 17–0 in the third after John Wozniak returned a blocked punt 38-yards for a touchdown. The game then concluded with a pair of fourth-quarter touchdowns. The first was scored by Alabama on a one-yard Harry Gilmer run and the second for State on a short Wallace Matulich run.

== Thomas resignation ==
The struggles of the 1946 team might have been caused in part by the deteriorating health of coach Frank Thomas. High blood pressure left him bedridden for most of the 1946 season, unable to stand for long periods, and forced to ride in a trailer to conduct many Alabama practices. After the 1946 season his ill health forced his resignation when he was only 48 years old, and Thomas later died in Tuscaloosa on May 10, 1954. During his fifteen seasons as head coach at Alabama, Thomas won four SEC championships and compiled an overall record of 115 wins, 24 losses and seven ties (115–24–7) record, for an .812 winning percentage.

Prior to the conclusion of the season, speculation began as to who would succeed Thomas as the head coach of the Crimson Tide. In early November, sources indicated that former Thomas player, and then head coach at Kentucky, Bear Bryant was to become the next head coach of the Crimson Tide. On November 11, Bryant stated that he had not been in contact about the Alabama job and indicated his focus was on the Wildcats. After an exhaustive search, on January 14, 1947, former Thomas assistant and then head coach at Ole Miss, Harold Drew was introduced as the new head coach of the Crimson Tide.

== Personnel ==
=== Varsity letter winners ===
Player	Hometown	Position
Johnny August	Shadyside, Ohio	Halfback
Bill Baughman	Jeannette, Pennsylvania	Center
Jim Bush	Columbus, Georgia	Guard
Billy Cadenhead	Greenville, Mississippi	Halfback
Jim Cain	Eudora, Arkansas	End
Francis Cassidy	Neff, Ohio	Tackle
Charles Compton	Sylacauga, Alabama	Tackle
Ted Cook	Birmingham, Alabama	End
James Corbitt	Nashville, Tennessee	Halfback
Dick Flowers	Mobile, Alabama	Tackle
Steve Fortunato	Mingo Junction, Ohio	Guard
D. Joe Gambrell	Talladega, Alabama	Center
Harry Gilmer	Birmingham, Alabama	Halfback
Fred Grant	Christiansburg, Virginia	Fullback
Jim Grantham	Llano, Texas	End
Norwood Hodges	Hueytown, Alabama	Fullback
Bob Hood	Gadsden, Alabama	Tackle
Vaughn Mancha	Birmingham, Alabama	Center
Ted McKosky	Monessen, Pennsylvania	Guard
Hugh Morrow	Birmingham, Alabama	Quarterback
Norman Mosley	Blytheville, Arkansas	Halfback
Gordon Pettus	Birmingham, Alabama	Halfback
T. Ray Richeson	Russellville, Alabama	Tackle
James Robertson	Scottsboro, Alabama	Halfback
Hal Self	Decatur, Alabama	Quarterback
John Staples	Owensboro, Kentucky	Guard
Lowell Tew	Waynesboro, Mississippi	Fullback
Tom Whitley	Birmingham, Alabama	Tackle
John Wozniak	Fairhope, Pennsylvania	Guard

=== Coaching staff ===
Name	Position	Seasons at Alabama	Alma mater
Frank Thomas	Head coach	15	Notre Dame (1923)
Lew Bostick	Assistant coach	3	Alabama (1939)
Dixie Howell	Assistant coach	1	Alabama (1935)
Joe Kilgrow	Assistant coach	3	Alabama (1937)
Malcolm Laney	Assistant coach	3	Alabama (1932)
Tom Lieb	Assistant coach	1	Notre Dame (1923)

== After the season ==
The 1947 NFL draft was held on December 16, 1946. The following Crimson Tide player was selected.

Round	Pick	Player	Position	NFL club
24	216	Bill Cadenhead	Back	Detroit Lions
