= 1946 Kentucky Wildcats football team =

American college football season

1946 Kentucky Wildcats football
- Conference: Southeastern Conference
- Record: 7–3 (2–3 SEC)
- Head coach: Bear Bryant (1st season)
- Captain: Phil Cutchin
- Home stadium: McLean Stadium

1946 Southeastern Conference football standings
	Conf.					Overall
Team	W		L		T	W		L		T
No. 3 Georgia +	5	–	0	–	0	11	–	0	–	0
No. 7 Tennessee +	5	–	0	–	0	9	–	2	–	0
No. 8 LSU	5	–	1	–	0	9	–	1	–	1
No. 11 Georgia Tech	4	–	2	–	0	9	–	2	–	0
Mississippi State	3	–	2	–	0	8	–	2	–	0
Alabama	4	–	3	–	0	7	–	4	–	0
Vanderbilt	3	–	4	–	0	5	–	4	–	0
Kentucky	2	–	3	–	0	7	–	3	–	0
Tulane	2	–	4	–	0	3	–	7	–	0
Auburn	1	–	5	–	0	4	–	6	–	0
Ole Miss	1	–	6	–	0	2	–	7	–	0
Florida	0	–	5	–	0	0	–	9	–	0
$ – Conference champion; Rankings from AP Poll

The 1946 Kentucky Wildcats football team was an American football team that represented the University of Kentucky in the Southeastern Conference (SEC) during the 1946 college football season. In their first season under head coach Bear Bryant, the Wildcats compiled a 7–3 record (2–3 against SEC opponents) and outscored opponents by a total of 233 to 90.

Bryant was hired as Kentucky's head football coach in January 1946. He had been the head coach at Maryland in 1945. At age 32, he was one of the youngest head coaches at a major university. Bryant took over a program that had compiled losing records of 2–8 in 1945, 3–6 in 1944, and 3–6–1 in 1942 – while winning only one game against an SEC opponent during the three years. Bryant promptly turned the program around, eventually leading the Wildcats to SEC and Sugar Bowl championships in 1950.

Two Kentucky players received honors from the Associated Press (AP) or United Press (UP) on the 1946 All-SEC football team: Wallace Jones at end (AP-1, UP-3); and Dan Phelps at halfback (UP-2).

Kentucky was ranked at No. 14 in the final Litkenhous Difference by Score System rankings for 1946.

The team played its home games at McLean Stadium in Lexington, Kentucky.

== Schedule ==
Date	Opponent	Rank	Site	Result	Attendance	Source
September 21	Ole Miss		McLean Stadium; Lexington, KY	W 20–7	19,600	
September 28	at Cincinnati*		Nippert Stadium; Cincinnati, OH	W 26–7	27,000	
October 5	Xavier*		McLean Stadium; Lexington, KY	W 70–0	20,200	
October 11	at No. 8 Georgia	No. 19	Sanford Stadium; Athens, GA	L 13–28	25,000	
October 19	Vanderbilt^{†}		McLean Stadium; Lexington, KY (rivalry)	W 10–7	21,000	
October 26	at No. 11 Alabama		Cramton Bowl; Montgomery, AL	L 7–21	22,500	
November 2	Michigan State*		McLean Stadium; Lexington, KY	W 39–14	19,700	
November 9	at Marquette*		Marquette Stadium; Milwaukee, WI	W 35–0	12,000	
November 16	West Virginia*		McLean Stadium; Lexington, KY	W 13–0	20,000	
November 23	at No. 7 Tennessee		Shields-Watkins Field; Knoxville, TN (rivalry)	L 0–7	35,000	
*Non-conference game; ^{†}Homecoming; Rankings from AP Poll released prior to the game

== Rankings ==
Ranking movements Legend: ██ Increase in ranking ██ Decrease in ranking — = Not ranked т = Tied with team above or below
	Week								
Poll	1	2	3	4	5	6	7	8	Final
AP	19т	—	—	—	—	—	—	—	—

== 1947 NFL draft ==
The 1947 NFL draft was held on December 16, 1946. The following Wildcats were selected.

Round	Pick	Player	Position	NFL club
3	18	Ermal Allen	Quarterback	Chicago Cardinals
27	151	Phil Cutchin	Back	Philadelphia Eagles
