= 1946 Vanderbilt Commodores football team =

American college football season

1946 Vanderbilt Commodores football
- Conference: Southeastern Conference
- Record: 5–4 (3–4 SEC)
- Head coach: Red Sanders (4th season)
- Offensive scheme: Single-wing
- Captain: Alf Satterfield
- Home stadium: Dudley Field

1946 Southeastern Conference football standings
	Conf.					Overall
Team	W		L		T	W		L		T
No. 3 Georgia +	5	–	0	–	0	11	–	0	–	0
No. 7 Tennessee +	5	–	0	–	0	9	–	2	–	0
No. 8 LSU	5	–	1	–	0	9	–	1	–	1
No. 11 Georgia Tech	4	–	2	–	0	9	–	2	–	0
Mississippi State	3	–	2	–	0	8	–	2	–	0
Alabama	4	–	3	–	0	7	–	4	–	0
Vanderbilt	3	–	4	–	0	5	–	4	–	0
Kentucky	2	–	3	–	0	7	–	3	–	0
Tulane	2	–	4	–	0	3	–	7	–	0
Auburn	1	–	5	–	0	4	–	6	–	0
Ole Miss	1	–	6	–	0	2	–	7	–	0
Florida	0	–	5	–	0	0	–	9	–	0
$ – Conference champion; Rankings from AP Poll

The 1946 Vanderbilt Commodores football team was an American football team that represented Vanderbilt University in the Southeastern Conference (SEC) during the 1946 college football season. In their fourth season under head coach Red Sanders, the Commodores compiled a 5–4 record (3–4 against SEC opponents) and outscored all opponents by a total of 108 to 43.

Two Vanderbilt players received honors from the United Press (UP) on the 1946 All-SEC football team: end Josh North (UP-2); and tackle Alf Stterfield (UP-3).

Vanderbilt was ranked at No. 26 in the final Litkenhous Difference by Score System rankings for 1946.

== Schedule ==
Date	Opponent	Site	Result	Attendance	Source
September 28	Tennessee Tech*	Dudley Field; Nashville, TN	W 35–0	18,000	
October 5	at Ole Miss	Crump Stadium; Memphis, TN (rivalry)	W 7–0	22,000	
October 12	Florida	Dudley Field; Nashville, TN	W 20–0	20,000	
October 19	at Kentucky	McLean Stadium; Lexington, KY (rivalry)	L 7–10	21,000	
October 26	LSU	Dudley Field; Nashville, TN	L 0–14	21,500	
November 2	at Auburn	Cramton Bowl; Montgomery, AL	W 19–0	16,000	
November 9	No. 20 NC State*	Dudley Field; Nashville, TN	W 7–0	17,500	
November 16	at Alabama	Legion Field; Birmingham, AL	L 7–12		
November 30	No. 8 Tennessee	Dudley Field; Nashville, TN (rivalry)	L 6–7		
*Non-conference game; Rankings from AP Poll released prior to the game

== After the season ==
The 1947 NFL draft was held on December 16, 1946. The following Commodores were selected.

Round	Pick	Player	Position	NFL club
4	24	Charley Hoover	Center	Detroit Lions
8	61	Al Satterfield	Guard	Philadelphia Eagles
21	189	Fred Hamilton	Tackle	Pittsburgh Steelers
23	209	Binks Bushmiaer	Back	Pittsburgh Steelers
