= Broughton Williams =

American football player (1922–2011)

Florida Gators
- Position: End

Personal information
- Born: October 15, 1922; Florida, U.S.
- Died: February 10, 2011 (aged 88); Tampa, Florida, U.S.
- Listed height: 6 ft 3 in (1.91 m)
- Listed weight: 195 lb (88 kg)

Career information
- High school: Plant
- College: Florida (1941–1942; 1946)

Awards and highlights
- NCAA receiving leader (1946); First-team All-SEC (1946)

Charles Broughton "Brute" Williams (October 15, 1922 – February 10, 2011) was an American football player. He played college football for the Florida Gators football team in 1941, 1942, and 1946, with his collegiate career having been interrupted by military service during World War II. Williams played for a winless 1946 Florida team that compiled an 0–9 record, catching 29 passes for 490 yards in eight games. Despite missing the last two games of the 1946 season due to injury, he led the NCAA in receiving yards that year. In the Gators' 1946 loss to North Carolina, Williams caught eight passes for 166 yards, setting a Florida Gators record for single-game receiving yards that stood for more than 20 years until broken by Carlos Alvarez in 1969. He also posted a then-school record 9 receptions in the 13–27 loss to Tulane. He was selected by the United Press as a first-team end on the 1946 All-SEC football team. Dr. John J. Tigert called Williams "one of the finest pass receivers I've ever seen."

In March 1947, Williams gave up his final two years of college eligibility and signed a contract to play professional football for the Chicago Bears, who selected him in the 20th round of the 1945 NFL draft. He appears not to have played in any regular season NFL games. He later coached high school football at Columbia High School and at Lake City. He later established the Broughton Williams School in Tampa.

== See also ==
- List of college football yearly receiving leaders
