= 1946 Mississippi State Maroons football team =

American college football season

1946 Mississippi State Maroons football
- Conference: Southeastern Conference
- Record: 8–2 (3–2 SEC)
- Head coach: Allyn McKeen (7th season)
- Home stadium: Scott Field

1946 Southeastern Conference football standings
	Conf.					Overall
Team	W		L		T	W		L		T
No. 3 Georgia +	5	–	0	–	0	11	–	0	–	0
No. 7 Tennessee +	5	–	0	–	0	9	–	2	–	0
No. 8 LSU	5	–	1	–	0	9	–	1	–	1
No. 11 Georgia Tech	4	–	2	–	0	9	–	2	–	0
Mississippi State	3	–	2	–	0	8	–	2	–	0
Alabama	4	–	3	–	0	7	–	4	–	0
Vanderbilt	3	–	4	–	0	5	–	4	–	0
Kentucky	2	–	3	–	0	7	–	3	–	0
Tulane	2	–	4	–	0	3	–	7	–	0
Auburn	1	–	5	–	0	4	–	6	–	0
Ole Miss	1	–	6	–	0	2	–	7	–	0
Florida	0	–	5	–	0	0	–	9	–	0
$ – Conference champion; Rankings from AP Poll

The 1946 Mississippi State Maroons football team was an American football team that represented Mississippi State College in the Southeastern Conference during the 1946 college football season. In their seventh season under head coach Allyn McKeen, the Maroons compiled an 8–2 record (3–2 against SEC opponents) and outscored all opponents by a total of 271 to 71.

Five Mississippi State players received honors from the Associated Press or United Press on the 1946 All-SEC football team: halfback Shorty McWilliams (AP-1, UP_3); tackle Al Sidorik (UP-1) end Bill Hildebrand (UP-2); center Elbert Corley (UP-3); and guard Mike Mihalic (UP-3).

Mississippi State was ranked at No. 10 in the final Litkenhous Difference by Score System rankings for 1946.

== Schedule ==
Date	Opponent	Rank	Site	Result	Attendance	Source
September 29	Chattanooga*		Scott Field; Starkville, MS	W 41–7	12,000	
October 5	at LSU		Tiger Stadium; Baton Rouge, LA (rivalry)	L 6–13	44,000	
October 12	at Michigan State*		Macklin Field; East Lansing, MI	W 6–0	22,000	
October 19	vs. San Francisco*		Crump Stadium; Memphis, TN	W 48–20	15,000	
October 26	at Tulane		Tulane Stadium; New Orleans, LA	W 14–7	45,000	
November 2	Murray State*		Scott Field; Starkville, MS	W 69–0		
November 9	at Auburn		Legion Field; Birmingham, AL	W 33–0	25,000	
November 16	Northwestern State*		Scott Field; Starkville, MS	W 27–0	5,000	
November 23	at Ole Miss		Hemingway Stadium; Oxford, MS (Egg Bowl)	W 20–0	26,000	
November 30	at Alabama	No. 19	Denny Stadium; Tuscaloosa, AL (rivalry)	L 7–24	25,000	
*Non-conference game; Rankings from AP Poll released prior to the game

== Rankings ==
Ranking movements Legend: ██ Increase in ranking ██ Decrease in ranking — = Not ranked
	Week								
Poll	1	2	3	4	5	6	7	8	Final
AP	—	—	—	—	—	—	—	19	—

== After the season ==
The 1947 NFL Draft was held on December 16, 1946. The following Maroon was selected.

Round	Pick	Player	Position	NFL Club
11	87	Alex Sidorik	Tackle	Boston Yanks
