= 1946 Ole Miss Rebels football team =

American college football season

1946 Ole Miss Rebels football
- Conference: Southeastern Conference
- Record: 2–7 (1–6 SEC)
- Head coach: Harold Drew (1st season)
- Home stadium: Hemingway Stadium; Crump Stadium

1946 Southeastern Conference football standings
	Conf.					Overall
Team	W		L		T	W		L		T
No. 3 Georgia +	5	–	0	–	0	11	–	0	–	0
No. 7 Tennessee +	5	–	0	–	0	9	–	2	–	0
No. 8 LSU	5	–	1	–	0	9	–	1	–	1
No. 11 Georgia Tech	4	–	2	–	0	9	–	2	–	0
Mississippi State	3	–	2	–	0	8	–	2	–	0
Alabama	4	–	3	–	0	7	–	4	–	0
Vanderbilt	3	–	4	–	0	5	–	4	–	0
Kentucky	2	–	3	–	0	7	–	3	–	0
Tulane	2	–	4	–	0	3	–	7	–	0
Auburn	1	–	5	–	0	4	–	6	–	0
Ole Miss	1	–	6	–	0	2	–	7	–	0
Florida	0	–	5	–	0	0	–	9	–	0
$ – Conference champion; Rankings from AP Poll

The 1946 Ole Miss Rebels football team was an American football team that represented the University of Mississippi in the Southeastern Conference (SEC) during the 1946 college football season. In their first year under head coach Harold Drew, the Rebels compiled a 2–7 record (1–6 against SEC opponents) and were outscored by a total of 144 to 76.

Two Ole Miss player ranked among the national leaders. Charlie Conerly ranked sixth nationally with 641 passing yards. End Barney Poole ranked fifth nationally with 28 pass receptions.

Several Ole Miss players received honors from the Associated Press (AP) or United Press (UP) on the 1946 All-SEC football team: Poole at end (AP-1, UP-1); Conerly at halfback (UP-1); Shorty McWilliams at halfback (AP-1, UP-3); Al Sidorik at tackle (UP-1); end Bill Hildebrand at end (UP-2); Elbert Corley at center (UP-3); and Mike Mihalic at guard (UP-3).

Ole Miss was ranked at No. 45 in the final Litkenhous Difference by Score System rankings for 1946.

The team played its home games at Crump Stadium in Memphis, Tennessee (three games) and at Hemingway Stadium in Oxford, Mississippi (two games).

== Schedule ==
Date	Opponent	Site	Result	Attendance	Source
September 21	at Kentucky	McLean Stadium; Lexington, KY	L 6–20	19,600	
September 28	vs. Florida	Fairfield Stadium; Jacksonville, FL	W 13–6	20,000	
October 5	Vanderbilt	Crump Stadium; Memphis, TN (rivalry)	L 0–7	22,000	
October 12	at Georgia Tech	Grant Field; Atlanta, GA	L 7–24	25,000	
October 19	Louisiana Tech*	Hemingway Stadium; Oxford, MS	L 6–7		
October 26	Arkansas*	Crump Stadium; Memphis, TN (rivalry)	W 9–7	25,000	
November 2	at LSU	Tiger Stadium; Baton Rouge, LA (rivalry)	L 21–34	25,000	
November 9	No. 7 Tennessee	Crump Stadium; Memphis, TN (rivalry)	L 14–18		
November 23	Mississippi State	Hemingway Stadium; Oxford, MS (Egg Bowl)	L 0–20	26,000	
*Non-conference game; Rankings from AP Poll released prior to the game

== Personnel ==
=== Coaching staff ===
Coach	Title
Harold Drew|	Head Coach
Johnny Vaught	Line Coach
Happy Campbell	Backfield Coach
Jim Whatley	Asst. Line Coach
Jess Alderman	Trainer

=== Roster ===
1946 Ole Miss Rebels Football
Quarterbacks: Pep Bennet; Bobby Oswalt; Mike Campbell; Halfbacks: Charles Conerly; Clayton Blount; Bob Wilson; Bill Mustin; Farley Salmon; Toby Majure; Cecil Dickerson; Johnny Bruce; Fullbacks: Eulas Jenkins; Buddy Bowen; Jim Attaya; Marvin Cutland	Tackles: Bill Erickson; Olver Poole; Ben Mann; George Lambert; Nate Williamson; Bert Thompson; Guards: Bernard Blackwell; Fred Brown; Phillip Poole; Doug Hamley; Bob Fuerst; Jimmy Crawford; Hunter Gates; Frank Fant; Centers: Paul Davis; Dave Bridges; Charles Bidgood	Ends: Ray Pole; H.A. Smith; Ivan Rosemund; Charles Galey; Jack Stribling; Russell Reid; Jack Odam; Everette Harper

== After the season ==
The 1947 NFL draft was held on December 16, 1946. The following Rebel was selected.

Round	Pick	Player	Position	NFL club
8	65	Allen Smith	End	Chicago Bears
