= 1946 LSU Tigers football team =

American college football season

1946 LSU Tigers football

Cotton Bowl Classic, T 0–0 vs. Arkansas
- Conference: Southeastern Conference

Ranking
- AP: No. 8
- Record: 9–1–1 (5–1 SEC)
- Head coach: Bernie Moore (12th season)
- Home stadium: Tiger Stadium

1946 Southeastern Conference football standings
| | Conf. | | | | | Overall |
| Team | W | | L | | T | W | | L | | T |
|---|---|---|---|---|---|---|---|---|---|---|
| No. 3 Georgia + | 5 | – | 0 | – | 0 | 11 | – | 0 | – | 0 |
| No. 7 Tennessee + | 5 | – | 0 | – | 0 | 9 | – | 2 | – | 0 |
| No. 8 LSU | 5 | – | 1 | – | 0 | 9 | – | 1 | – | 1 |
| No. 11 Georgia Tech | 4 | – | 2 | – | 0 | 9 | – | 2 | – | 0 |
| Mississippi State | 3 | – | 2 | – | 0 | 8 | – | 2 | – | 0 |
| Alabama | 4 | – | 3 | – | 0 | 7 | – | 4 | – | 0 |
| Vanderbilt | 3 | – | 4 | – | 0 | 5 | – | 4 | – | 0 |
| Kentucky | 2 | – | 3 | – | 0 | 7 | – | 3 | – | 0 |
| Tulane | 2 | – | 4 | – | 0 | 3 | – | 7 | – | 0 |
| Auburn | 1 | – | 5 | – | 0 | 4 | – | 6 | – | 0 |
| Ole Miss | 1 | – | 6 | – | 0 | 2 | – | 7 | – | 0 |
| Florida | 0 | – | 5 | – | 0 | 0 | – | 9 | – | 0 |
$ – Conference champion; Rankings from AP Poll

The 1946 LSU Tigers football team was an American football team that represented Louisiana State University (LSU) in the Southeastern Conference (SEC) during the 1946 college football season. In their 12th year under head coach Bernie Moore, the Tigers compiled a 9–1–1 record (5–1 against SEC opponents) and outscored opponents by a total of 240 to 123. They were ranked No. 6 in the final AP Poll and were invited to play in the 1947 Cotton Bowl Classic where they played a scoreless tie against Arkansas.

The Tigers ranked twelfth nationally in team defense, giving up an average of only 178.6 yards per game.

Offensively, the team was led by quarterback Y. A. Tittle who completed 45 of 95 passes for 780 yards and 13 touchdowns. Other key players included fullback Gene Knight with 473 rushing yards and ends Sam Lyle, Dan Sandifer, and Clyde Lindsey with 162, 159, and 157 receiving yards, respectively.

Four LSU players were honored by the Associated Press (AP) and/or United Press (UP) on the 1946 All-SEC football team: quarterback Y. A. Tittle (UP-1); guard Wren Worley (AP-1, UP-2); fullback Gene Knight (UP-2); and tackle Walter Barnes (UP-2).

== Schedule ==
| Date | Opponent | Rank | Site | Result | Attendance | Source |
|---|---|---|---|---|---|---|
| September 28 | at Rice* | | Rice Field; Houston, TX | W 7–6 | 26,000 | |
| October 5 | Mississippi State | | Tiger Stadium; Baton Rouge, LA (rivalry) | W 13–6 | 44,000 | |
| October 12 | Texas A&M* | No. 13 | Tiger Stadium; Baton Rouge, LA (rivalry) | W 33–9 | 30,000 | |
| October 19 | Georgia Tech^{†} | No. 12 | Tiger Stadium; Baton Rouge, LA | L 7–26 | 30,000 | |
| October 26 | at Vanderbilt | | Dudley Field; Nashville, TN | W 14–0 | 21,500 | |
| November 2 | Ole Miss | | Tiger Stadium; Baton Rouge, LA (rivalry) | W 34–21 | 25,000 | |
| November 9 | Alabama | No. 19 | Tiger Stadium; Baton Rouge, LA (rivalry) | W 31–21 | 46,000 | |
| November 15 | at Miami (FL)* | No. 11 | Burdine Stadium; Miami, FL | W 20–7 | 33,504 | |
| November 23 | Fordham* | No. 9 | Tiger Stadium; Baton Rouge, LA | W 40–0 | 15,000 | |
| November 30 | Tulane | No. 9 | Tiger Stadium; Baton Rouge, LA (Battle for the Rag) | W 41–27 | 46,000 | |
| January 1, 1947 | vs. No. 16 Arkansas* | No. 8 | Cotton Bowl; Dallas, TX (Cotton Bowl, rivalry) | T 0–0 | 38,000 | |
*Non-conference game; ^{†}Homecoming; Rankings from AP Poll released prior to the game

== Rankings ==
Ranking movements Legend: ██ Increase in ranking ██ Decrease in ranking — = Not ranked
| | Week | | | | | | | | |
| Poll | 1 | 2 | 3 | 4 | 5 | 6 | 7 | 8 | Final |
|---|---|---|---|---|---|---|---|---|---|
| AP | 13 | 12 | — | — | 19 | 11 | 9 | 9 | 8 |

== After the season ==
The 1947 NFL draft was held on December 16, 1946. The following Tigers were selected.

| Round | Pick | Player | Position | NFL club |
|---|---|---|---|---|
| 3 | 17 | Gene Knight | Back | Washington Redskins |
| 17 | 152 | Hubert Shurtz | Tackle | Philadelphia Eagles |
| 18 | 163 | Ed Champagne | Tackle | Los Angeles Rams |
| 20 | 179 | Charlie Webb | End | Washington Redskins |
| 20 | 182 | Fred Hall | Guard | Philadelphia Eagles |
| 21 | 192 | Shelton Ballard | Center | Chicago Cardinals |
| 30 | 282 | Clyde Lindsley | End | Chicago Cardinals |
