= 1946 Auburn Tigers football team =

American college football season

1946 Auburn Tigers football
- Conference: Southeastern Conference
- Record: 4–6 (1–5 SEC)
- Head coach: Carl M. Voyles (3rd season)
- Home stadium: Auburn Stadium; Legion Field; Cramton Bowl

1946 Southeastern Conference football standings
	Conf.					Overall
Team	W		L		T	W		L		T
No. 3 Georgia +	5	–	0	–	0	11	–	0	–	0
No. 7 Tennessee +	5	–	0	–	0	9	–	2	–	0
No. 8 LSU	5	–	1	–	0	9	–	1	–	1
No. 11 Georgia Tech	4	–	2	–	0	9	–	2	–	0
Mississippi State	3	–	2	–	0	8	–	2	–	0
Alabama	4	–	3	–	0	7	–	4	–	0
Vanderbilt	3	–	4	–	0	5	–	4	–	0
Kentucky	2	–	3	–	0	7	–	3	–	0
Tulane	2	–	4	–	0	3	–	7	–	0
Auburn	1	–	5	–	0	4	–	6	–	0
Ole Miss	1	–	6	–	0	2	–	7	–	0
Florida	0	–	5	–	0	0	–	9	–	0
$ – Conference champion; Rankings from AP Poll

The 1946 Auburn Tigers football team was an American football team that represented Auburn University in the Southeastern Conference (SEC) during the 1946 college football season. It was Auburn's 55th season of intercollegiate football and its 14th season as a member of the SEC. The Tigers were led by head coach Carl M. Voyles, in his third year at Auburn, and compiled a record of four wins and six losses (4–6 overall, 1–5 in the SEC). They were outscored by a total of 210 to 132.

Auburn back Travis Tidwell led the nation in total offense with 1,715 yards—772 rushing and 943 passing. He also led the nation with 79 pass completions and ranked seventh in rushing yards.

Auburn was ranked at No. 69 in the final Litkenhous Difference by Score System rankings for 1946.

The team played its home games at the Cramton Bowl in Montgomery, Alabama (three games), Legion Field in Birmingham (two games), and Auburn Stadium in Auburn (one game).

== Schedule ==
Date	Opponent	Site	Result	Attendance	Source
September 27	Mississippi Southern*	Cramton Bowl; Montgomery, AL	W 13–12	12,000	
October 5	Furman*^{†}	Auburn Stadium; Auburn, AL	W 26–6	11,000	
October 12	Saint Louis*	Legion Field; Birmingham, AL	W 27–7	12,000	
October 19	at Tulane	Tulane Stadium; New Orleans, LA (rivalry)	L 0–32	35,000	
October 26	at Georgia Tech	Grant Field; Atlanta, GA (rivalry)	L 6–27	30,000	
November 2	Vanderbilt	Cramton Bowl; Montgomery, AL	L 0–19	16,000	
November 9	Mississippi State	Legion Field; Birmingham, AL	L 0–33	25,000	
November 16	vs. Georgia	Memorial Stadium; Columbus, GA (Deep South's Oldest Rivalry)	L 0–41	22,000	
November 23	Clemson*	Cramton Bowl; Montgomery, AL (rivalry)	L 13–21	8,000	
November 30	at Florida	Florida Field; Gainesville, FL (rivalry)	W 47–12	8,000	
*Non-conference game; ^{†}Homecoming
