= 1946 Portland Pilots football team =

American college football season

1946 Portland Pilots football
- Conference: Independent
- Record: 1–4–1
- Head coach: Hal Moe (1st season)
- Home stadium: Multnomah Stadium

1946 Western major college football independents records
	Conf.			Overall
Team	W	L	T	W		L		T
Nevada		–		7	–	2	–	0
Saint Mary's		–		6	–	3	–	0
San Francisco		–		3	–	6	–	0
Santa Clara		–		2	–	5	–	1
Portland		–		1	–	5	–	1

The 1946 Portland Pilots football team was an American football team that represented the University of Portland as an independent during the 1946 college football season. In its first year under head coach Hal Moe, the team compiled a 1–4–1 record. The team played its home games at Multnomah Stadium in Portland, Oregon.

== Schedule ==
Date	Opponent	Site	Result	Attendance	Source
October 5	at Oregon State	Bell Field; Corvallis, OR	L 0–35		
October 13	Santa Clara	Multnomah Stadium; Portland, OR	L 0–6	3,500–5,354	
October 19	at Arizona State	Goodwin Stadium; Tempe, AZ	W 13–0		
November 1	Willamette	Multnomah Stadium; Portland, OR	T 6–6	5,000	
November 9	vs. Montana State	Memorial Stadium; Great Falls, MT	L 6–19	6,000	
November 16	at Idaho	Neale Stadium; Moscow, ID	L 6–20	1,500–3,500	
November 29	at San Jose State	Spartan Stadium; San Jose, CA	L 19–26	6,500	
