= Harold Griffin (American football) =

American football player

Profile
- Position: Halfback

Personal information
- Born: c. 1929
- Listed weight: 165 lb (75 kg)

Career information
- High school: Hillsborough (Tampa, FL)
- College: Florida (1946–1949)

Awards and highlights
- NCAA punt return leader (1946)

Harold Griffin (born c. 1929) is an American former football player. He played college football as a back for the Florida Gators football team. He led the NCAA major college players in 1946 with an average of 20.1 yards per punt return and set an unofficial national collegiate record with an average of 26.7 yards per return in 1947.

== Early life ==
Griffin grew up in Tampa, Florida, and attended Hillsborough High School where he was selected as an All-Southern high school player in 1945.

== University of Florida ==
Griffin enrolled at the University of Florida in Gainesville, Florida, after first enrolling at Auburn University. He shared the Gators' backfield with Chuck Hunsinger from 1946 to 1949. As a freshman in 1946, he led all NCAA major college players with an average of 20.1 yards per punt return. On October 19, 1946, he returned a punt 98 yards down the right sideline for a touchdown in Florida's homecoming game against Miami. He returned another punt 87 yards during the 1946 season, and on November 23, 1946, he ran 73 yards for Florida's only touchdown against NC State.

As a sophomore in 1947, Griffin reportedly set a new national record with an average of 26.7 yards per punt return, including returns of 67 and 90 yards. On November 14, 1947, he also returned a punt 46 yards with two minutes remaining in the game to set up the Gators' tying touchdown against Tulane. On October 1, 1949, he returned a punt 61 yards for a touchdown in a victory over Tulsa.

== See also ==
- List of NCAA major college yearly punt and kickoff return leaders
