= 1946 Montana Grizzlies football team =

American college football season

1946 Montana Grizzlies football
- Conference: Pacific Coast Conference
- Record: 4–4 (1–3 PCC)
- Head coach: Doug Fessenden (8th season)
- Home stadium: Dornblaser Field

1946 Pacific Coast Conference football standings
	Conf.					Overall
Team	W		L		T	W		L		T
No. 4 UCLA $	7	–	0	–	0	10	–	1	–	0
Oregon State	6	–	1	–	1	7	–	1	–	1
USC	5	–	2	–	0	6	–	4	–	0
Washington	5	–	3	–	0	5	–	4	–	0
Stanford	3	–	3	–	1	6	–	3	–	1
Oregon	3	–	4	–	1	4	–	4	–	1
Montana	1	–	3	–	0	4	–	4	–	0
Washington State	1	–	5	–	1	1	–	6	–	1
California	1	–	6	–	0	2	–	7	–	0
Idaho	0	–	5	–	0	1	–	8	–	0
$ – Conference champion; Rankings from AP Poll

The 1946 Montana Grizzlies football team represented the University of Montana in the 1946 college football season as a member of the Pacific Coast Conference (PCC). The Grizzlies were led by eighth-year head coach Doug Fessenden, played their home games at Dornblaser Field and finished the season with a record of four wins and four losses (4–4, 1–3 PCC).

== Schedule ==
Date	Opponent	Site	Result	Attendance	Source
September 27	Colorado A&M*	Dornblaser Field; Missoula, MT	W 26–0		
October 5	Eastern Washington*	Dornblaser Field; Missoula, MT (rivalry)	W 31–7		
October 12	at Oregon	Hayward Field; Eugene, OR	L 0–34		
October 19	vs. Montana State*	Naranche Stadium; Butte, MT (rivalry)	W 20–7	10,000	
October 26	Utah State*^{†}	Dornblaser Field; Missoula, MT	L 0–26	12,000	
November 2	Idaho	Dornblaser Field; Missoula, MT (Little Brown Stein)	W 19–0		
November 16	at UCLA	Los Angeles Memorial Coliseum; Los Angeles, CA	L 7–61	23,000	
November 23	at Washington	Husky Stadium; Seattle, WA	L 0–21	7,000	
*Non-conference game; ^{†}Homecoming
