= 1947 Oil Bowl =

Saint Mary's Gaels	Georgia Tech Yellow Jackets
(6–2)	(8–2)
19	41
Head coach: James Phelan	Head coach: Bobby Dodd
	AP 11
	1	2	3	4	Total
Saint Mary's	0	7	6	6	19
Georgia Tech	7	20	7	7	41
- Date: January 1, 1947
- Season: 1946
- Stadium: Rice Field
- Location: Houston, Texas
- Attendance: 23,000

The 1947 Oil Bowl was a college football postseason bowl game that featured the Saint Mary's Gaels and the Georgia Tech Yellow Jackets.

== Background ==
In Bobby Dodd's second year as coach of the Yellow Jackets, he guided them to a 4th-place finish in the Southeastern Conference, in their fifth bowl appearance in the decade. The Gaels were going to a bowl game for the second straight year.

== Game summary ==
The Gaels had eight passes intercepted, with W.P. McHugh returning one 73 yards for a touchdown. George Brodnax caught two touchdowns.

== Aftermath ==
Phelan left the program the following year to become coach of the Los Angeles Dons. This was the last bowl game the Gaels participated in before the dismantlement of the football program in 2004. The Yellow Jackets went to seven bowl games in the next 10 years.
