= 1946 Santa Clara Broncos football team =

American college football season

1946 Santa Clara Broncos football
- Conference: Independent
- Record: 2–5–1
- Head coach: Len Casanova (1st season)
- Home stadium: Kezar Stadium

1946 Western major college football independents records
	Conf.			Overall
Team	W	L	T	W		L		T
Nevada		–		7	–	2	–	0
Saint Mary's		–		6	–	3	–	0
San Francisco		–		3	–	6	–	0
Santa Clara		–		2	–	5	–	1
Portland		–		1	–	5	–	1

The 1946 Santa Clara Broncos football team was an American football team that represented Santa Clara University as an independent during the 1946 college football season. In their first season under head coach Len Casanova, the Broncos compiled a 2–5–1 record and were outscored by opponents by a combined total of 181 to 112.

== Schedule ==
Date	Opponent	Site	Result	Attendance	Source
September 28	at Fresno State	Ratcliffe Stadium; Fresno, CA	L 7–20	14,694	
October 5	at Nevada	Mackay Stadium; Reno, NV	L 7–33	6,000	
October 13	at Portland	Multnomah Stadium; Portland, OR	W 6–0	3,500–5,354	
October 19	at Stanford	Stanford Stadium; Stanford, CA	L 26–33	20,000	
October 26	at No. 5 UCLA	Los Angeles Memorial Coliseum; Los Angeles, CA	L 7–33	36,000	
November 2	vs. San Francisco	Kezar Stadium; San Francisco, CA	W 19–13	30,000	
November 9	at Arizona	Varsity Stadium; Tucson, AZ	T 21–21	11,500	
November 16	vs. Saint Mary's	Kezar Stadium; San Francisco, CA	L 19–28	55,000	
Rankings from AP Poll released prior to the game
