= 1946 San Francisco Dons football team =

American college football season

1946 San Francisco Dons football
- Conference: Independent
- Record: 3–6
- Head coach: Clipper Smith (1st season)
- Home stadium: Kezar Stadium

1946 Western major college football independents records
	Conf.			Overall
Team	W	L	T	W		L		T
Nevada		–		7	–	2	–	0
Saint Mary's		–		6	–	3	–	0
San Francisco		–		3	–	6	–	0
Santa Clara		–		2	–	5	–	1
Portland		–		1	–	5	–	1

The 1946 San Francisco Dons football team was an American football team that represented the University of San Francisco as an independent during the 1946 college football season. In their first and only season under head coach Clipper Smith, the Dons compiled a 3–6 record and were outscored by their opponents by a combined total of 172 to 162.

Forrest Hall led San Francisco's ground attack and ranked 19th nationally with 579 rushing yards and averaged 6.51 yards per carry.

San Francisco was ranked at No. 86 in the final Litkenhous Difference by Score System rankings for 1946.

== Schedule ==
Date	Opponent	Site	Result	Attendance	Source
September 29	Nevada	Kezar Stadium; San Francisco, CA	W 26–14	30,000	
October 5	at Stanford	Stanford Stadium; Stanford, CA	L 7–33	40,000	
October 13	Detroit	Kezar Stadium; San Francisco, CA	L 6–18	20,000	
October 19	vs. Mississippi State	Crump Stadium; Memphis, TN	L 20–48	15,000	
November 3	Santa Clara	Kezar Stadium; San Francisco, CA	L 13–19	30,000	
November 9	Kansas State	Kezar Stadium; San Francisco, CA	W 38–6	< 4,000	
November 16	Utah	Kezar Stadium; San Francisco, CA	L 13–21	5,000	
November 24	Wyoming	Kezar Stadium; San Francisco, CA	W 39–7	10,000	
November 30	Saint Mary's	Kezar Stadium; San Francisco, CA	L 0–6	50,000	

== After the season ==
The 1947 NFL draft was held on December 16, 1946. The following Don was selected.

Round	Pick	Player	Position	NFL club
5	27	Carroll Vogelaar	Tackle	Boston Yanks
