= 1946 Washington State Cougars football team =

American college football season

1946 Washington State Cougars football
- Conference: Pacific Coast Conference
- Record: 1–6–1 (1–5–1 PCC)
- Head coach: Phil Sarboe (2nd season)
- Home stadium: Rogers Field

1946 Pacific Coast Conference football standings
	Conf.					Overall
Team	W		L		T	W		L		T
No. 4 UCLA $	7	–	0	–	0	10	–	1	–	0
Oregon State	6	–	1	–	1	7	–	1	–	1
USC	5	–	2	–	0	6	–	4	–	0
Washington	5	–	3	–	0	5	–	4	–	0
Stanford	3	–	3	–	1	6	–	3	–	1
Oregon	3	–	4	–	1	4	–	4	–	1
Montana	1	–	3	–	0	4	–	4	–	0
Washington State	1	–	5	–	1	1	–	6	–	1
California	1	–	6	–	0	2	–	7	–	0
Idaho	0	–	5	–	0	1	–	8	–	0
$ – Conference champion; Rankings from AP Poll

The 1946 Washington State Cougars football team was an American football team that represented Washington State College in the Pacific Coast Conference (PCC) during the 1946 college football season. Second-year head coach Phil Sarboe led the Cougars to a 1–6–1 overall record (1–5–1 in PCC, eighth).

Washington State was ranked at No. 89 in the final Litkenhous Difference by Score System rankings for 1946.

All three home games were played in October, on campus at Rogers Field in Pullman.

== Schedule ==
Date	Opponent	Site	Result	Attendance	Source
September 27	at USC	Los Angeles Memorial Coliseum; Los Angeles, CA	L 7–13	68,282	
October 5	Idaho	Rogers Field; Pullman, WA (rivalry)	W 32–0	14,000	
October 12	Washington	Rogers Field; Pullman, WA (rivalry)	L 7–21	26,000	
October 19	at Oregon	Hayward Field; Eugene, OR	T 0–0	18,000	
October 26	Oregon State	Rogers Field; Pullman, WA	L 12–13	15,000	
November 2	at California	California Memorial Stadium; Berkeley, CA	L 14–47	30,000	
November 16	at Stanford	Stanford Stadium; Stanford, CA	L 26–27	8,000	
November 30	at Michigan State*	Macklin Field; East Lansing, MI	L 20–26	19,691	
*Non-conference game

== NFL draft ==
Four Cougars were selected in the 1947 NFL draft, held on December 16, 1946.

Round	Overall	Player	Position	NFL club
20	177	Darrell Waller	Back	Bostpn Yanks
21	188	Elmo Bond	Tackle	Washington Redskins
26	239	Francis Bocoka	End	Washington Redskins
27	252	Dick Abrams	Back	Chicago Cardinals
