= 1946 Stanford Indians football team =

American college football season

1946 Stanford Indians football
- Conference: Pacific Coast Conference
- Record: 6–3–1 (3–3–1 PCC)
- Head coach: Marchmont Schwartz (2nd season)
- Home stadium: Stanford Stadium

1946 Pacific Coast Conference football standings
	Conf.					Overall
Team	W		L		T	W		L		T
No. 4 UCLA $	7	–	0	–	0	10	–	1	–	0
Oregon State	6	–	1	–	1	7	–	1	–	1
USC	5	–	2	–	0	6	–	4	–	0
Washington	5	–	3	–	0	5	–	4	–	0
Stanford	3	–	3	–	1	6	–	3	–	1
Oregon	3	–	4	–	1	4	–	4	–	1
Montana	1	–	3	–	0	4	–	4	–	0
Washington State	1	–	5	–	1	1	–	6	–	1
California	1	–	6	–	0	2	–	7	–	0
Idaho	0	–	5	–	0	1	–	8	–	0
$ – Conference champion; Rankings from AP Poll

The 1946 Stanford Indians football team was an American football team that represented Stanford University in the Pacific Coast Conference (PCC) during the 1946 college football season. This was the team's first season since 1942 because the team suspended play for three years due to World War II. Stanford's head coach was Marchmont Schwartz, who had coached the 1942 team as well. The team compiled a 6–3–1 record (3–3–1 against PCC opponents) and outscored all opponents by a total of 222 to 147.

Two Stanford players received first-team honors from the Associated Press (AP) and United Press on the 1946 All-Pacific Coast football team: fullback Lloyd Merriman (AP-1, UP-1) and guard Bill Hachten (AP-1, UP-1). Merriman ranked first in the PCC and 12th nationally with 672 net rushing yards on 142 carries, an average of 4.8 yards per carry.

Stanford was ranked at No. 54 in the final Litkenhous Difference by Score System rankings for 1946.

The team played its home games at Stanford Stadium in Stanford, California.

== Schedule ==
Date	Opponent	Rank	Site	Result	Attendance	Source
September 28	Idaho		Stanford Stadium; Stanford, CA	W 45–0	15,000	
October 5	San Francisco*		Stanford Stadium; Stanford, CA	W 33–7	40,000	
October 12	at No. 5 UCLA	No. 17	Los Angeles Memorial Coliseum; Los Angeles, CA	L 6–26	90,803	
October 19	Santa Clara*		Stanford Stadium; Stanford, CA	W 33–26	20,000	
October 26	USC		Stanford Stadium; Stanford, CA (rivalry)	L 20–28	45,000	
November 2	at Oregon State		Bell Field; Corvallis, OR	T 0–0	17,000	
November 9	Washington		Stanford Stadium; Stanford, CA	L 15–21	25,000	
November 16	Washington State		Stanford Stadium; Stanford, CA	W 27–26	8,000	
November 23	at California		California Memorial Stadium; Berkeley, CA (Big Game)	W 25–6	81,000	
December 23	at Hawaii*		Honolulu Stadium; Honolulu, Territory of Hawaii	W 18–7	17,000	
*Non-conference game; Rankings from AP Poll released prior to the game

== Rankings ==
Ranking movements Legend: ██ Increase in ranking ██ Decrease in ranking — = Not ranked
	Week								
Poll	1	2	3	4	5	6	7	8	Final
AP	17	—	—	—	—	—	—	—	—

== After the season ==
The 1947 NFL draft was held on December 16, 1946. The following Indians were selected.

Round	Pick	Player	Position	NFL club
5	32	Lloyd Merriman	Back	Chicago Bears
13	114	Bill Hachten	Guard	New York Giants
28	261	Charley Wakefield	Tackle	Philadelphia Eagles
29	268	Lynn Brownson	Back	Washington Redskins
