= 1946 Florida Gators football team =

American college football season

1946 Florida Gators football
- Conference: Southeastern Conference
- Record: 0–9 (0–5 SEC)
- Head coach: Raymond Wolf (1st season)
- Offensive scheme: Double-wing
- Captain: William Raborn
- Home stadium: Florida Field

1946 Southeastern Conference football standings
	Conf.					Overall
Team	W		L		T	W		L		T
No. 3 Georgia +	5	–	0	–	0	11	–	0	–	0
No. 7 Tennessee +	5	–	0	–	0	9	–	2	–	0
No. 8 LSU	5	–	1	–	0	9	–	1	–	1
No. 11 Georgia Tech	4	–	2	–	0	9	–	2	–	0
Mississippi State	3	–	2	–	0	8	–	2	–	0
Alabama	4	–	3	–	0	7	–	4	–	0
Vanderbilt	3	–	4	–	0	5	–	4	–	0
Kentucky	2	–	3	–	0	7	–	3	–	0
Tulane	2	–	4	–	0	3	–	7	–	0
Auburn	1	–	5	–	0	4	–	6	–	0
Ole Miss	1	–	6	–	0	2	–	7	–	0
Florida	0	–	5	–	0	0	–	9	–	0
$ – Conference champion; Rankings from AP Poll

The 1946 Florida Gators football team was an American football team that represented the University of Florida in the Southeastern Conference (SEC) during the 1946 college football season. In their first season under head coach Raymond Wolf, the Gators compiled a 0–9 record (0–5 against SEC opponents), finished last in the SEC, and were outscored by a total of 264 to 104.

The winless 0–9 season is the worst win–loss record in the history of Gators football to date, surpassing the winless 0–5 record of the 1916 Florida Gators football team. Despite the poor overall showing, Broughton Williams led the nation with 490 receiving yards. Harold Griffin led the nation in punt return average. Griffin had the longest punt return of the year, a 97-yard return against Miami (FL), and 92-yard return against Villanova.

The 1946 season was at the center of a school record 13-game losing streak which stretched from the last game of the 1945 campaign until the fourth contest of 1947. The players on these squads dubbed their time at Florida the "Golden Era", and members of the "Golden Era Gang" regularly held reunions and raised funds for scholarships and facilities improvements at UF for many subsequent years. Players on these teams included future Florida attorney general James W. Kynes and College Football Hall of Fame coach Marcelino Huerta.

Florida was ranked at No. 84 in the final Litkenhous Difference by Score System rankings for 1946.

== Schedule ==
Date	Time	Opponent	Site	Result	Attendance	Source
September 28		vs. Ole Miss	Fairfield Stadium; Jacksonville, FL	L 7–13	20,000	
October 5		at Tulane	Tulane Stadium; New Orleans, LA	L 13–27	30,000	
October 12		at Vanderbilt	Dudley Field; Nashville, TN	L 0–20	20,000	
October 19		Miami (FL)*^{†}	Florida Field; Gainesville, FL (rivalry)	L 13–20		
October 26	2:30 p.m.	at No. 10 North Carolina*	Kenan Memorial Stadium; Chapel Hill, NC	L 19–40	22,000	
November 9		vs. No. 5 Georgia	Fairfield Stadium; Jacksonville, FL (rivalry)	L 14–33	23,000	
November 16		Villanova*	Florida Field; Gainesville, FL	L 20–27	15,000	
November 23		vs. NC State*	Phillips Field; Tampa, FL	L 6–37	14,500	
November 30		Auburn	Florida Field; Gainesville, FL (rivalry)	L 12–47	8,000	
*Non-conference game; ^{†}Homecoming; Rankings from AP Poll released prior to the game
