= 1946 Idaho Vandals football team =

American college football season

1946 Idaho Vandals football
- Conference: Pacific Coast Conference
- Record: 1–8 (0–5 PCC)
- Head coach: James A. Brown (2nd season)
- Home stadium: Neale Stadium

1946 Pacific Coast Conference football standings
	Conf.					Overall
Team	W		L		T	W		L		T
No. 4 UCLA $	7	–	0	–	0	10	–	1	–	0
Oregon State	6	–	1	–	1	7	–	1	–	1
USC	5	–	2	–	0	6	–	4	–	0
Washington	5	–	3	–	0	5	–	4	–	0
Stanford	3	–	3	–	1	6	–	3	–	1
Oregon	3	–	4	–	1	4	–	4	–	1
Montana	1	–	3	–	0	4	–	4	–	0
Washington State	1	–	5	–	1	1	–	6	–	1
California	1	–	6	–	0	2	–	7	–	0
Idaho	0	–	5	–	0	1	–	8	–	0
$ – Conference champion; Rankings from AP Poll

The 1946 Idaho Vandals football team represented the University of Idaho in the 1946 college football season. The Vandals were led by second-year head coach James A. Brown and were members of the Pacific Coast Conference. Home games were played on campus at Neale Stadium in Moscow, with none held in Boise this season.

Idaho was 1–8 overall and lost all five of their PCC games.

The Vandals' losing streak in the Battle of the Palouse with neighbor Washington State reached eighteen games, shut out 0–32 in Pullman on October 5. Idaho tied the Cougars four years later, but the winless streak continued until 1954.

In the rivalry game with Montana in Missoula, Idaho was blanked 0–19 to relinquish the Little Brown Stein; it was the fourth of six straight shutouts in the series, with each side winning three.

Shortly after the final game on Thanksgiving, Brown resigned as head coach; succeeded by Dixie Howell in February 1947.

== Schedule ==
Date	Time	Opponent	Site	Result	Attendance	Source
September 28		at Stanford	Stanford Stadium; Stanford, CA	L 0–45	15,000	
October 5	2:00 pm	at Washington State	Rogers Field; Pullman, WA (Battle of the Palouse)	L 0–32	14,000	
October 12		at Marquette*	Marquette Stadium; Milwaukee, WI	L 6–46	12,000	
October 19	2:00 pm	San Jose State*	Neale Stadium; Moscow, ID	L 14–26	6,000	
October 26	2:00 pm	Oregon^{†}	Neale Stadium; Moscow, ID	L 13–26	6,500	
November 2	1:00 pm	at Montana	Dornblaser Field; Missoula, MT (Little Brown Stein)	L 0–19		
November 9		at Oregon State	Bell Field; Corvallis, OR	L 0–34	4,000	
November 16		Portland*	Neale Stadium; Moscow, ID	W 20–6	1,500–3,500	
November 28		at Fresno State*	Ratcliffe Stadium; Fresno, CA	L 12–13	6,827	
*Non-conference game; ^{†}Homecoming; All times are in Pacific time

== Coaching staff ==
- Walt Price, line
- Ray Davis, backs
- Steve Belko, junior varsity

== All-conference ==
No Vandals were named to the All-Coast team.
