= 1946 Tulane Green Wave football team =

American college football season

1946 Tulane Green Wave football
- Conference: Southeastern Conference
- Record: 3–7 (2–4 SEC)
- Head coach: Henry Frnka (1st season)
- Captain: Robert Rice
- Home stadium: Tulane Stadium

1946 Southeastern Conference football standings
	Conf.					Overall
Team	W		L		T	W		L		T
No. 3 Georgia +	5	–	0	–	0	11	–	0	–	0
No. 7 Tennessee +	5	–	0	–	0	9	–	2	–	0
No. 8 LSU	5	–	1	–	0	9	–	1	–	1
No. 11 Georgia Tech	4	–	2	–	0	9	–	2	–	0
Mississippi State	3	–	2	–	0	8	–	2	–	0
Alabama	4	–	3	–	0	7	–	4	–	0
Vanderbilt	3	–	4	–	0	5	–	4	–	0
Kentucky	2	–	3	–	0	7	–	3	–	0
Tulane	2	–	4	–	0	3	–	7	–	0
Auburn	1	–	5	–	0	4	–	6	–	0
Ole Miss	1	–	6	–	0	2	–	7	–	0
Florida	0	–	5	–	0	0	–	9	–	0
$ – Conference champion; Rankings from AP Poll

The 1946 Tulane Green Wave football team was an American football team that represented Tulane University as a member of the Southeastern Conference (SEC) during the 1946 college football season. In its first year under head coach Henry Frnka, Tulane compiled a 3–7 record (2–4 in conference games), finished ninth in the SEC, and was outscored by a total of 209 to 179. Tulane was ranked No. 33 in the final Litkenhous Ratings released in December 1946.

Guard Gaston Bourgeois was selected as a second-team player on the United Press (third-team by the Associated Press) on the 1946 All-SEC football team.

The Green Wave played its home games at Tulane Stadium in New Orleans.

== Schedule ==
Date	Opponent	Site	Result	Attendance	Source
September 28	Alabama	Tulane Stadium; New Orleans, LA	L 6–7	64,317	
October 5	Florida	Tulane Stadium; New Orleans, LA	W 27–13	35,000	
October 12	Rice*	Tulane Stadium; New Orleans, LA	L 6–25	45,000	
October 19	Auburn	Tulane Stadium; New Orleans, LA (rivalry)	W 32–0	35,000	
October 26	Mississippi State	Tulane Stadium; New Orleans, LA	L 7–14	45,000	
November 9	Clemson*	Tulane Stadium; New Orleans, LA	W 54–13	25,301	
November 16	at No. 7 Georgia Tech	Grant Field; Atlanta, GA	L 7–35	32,000	
November 23	No. 2 Notre Dame*	Tulane Stadium; New Orleans, LA	L 0–41	65,841	
November 30	at No. 9 LSU	Tiger Stadium; Baton Rouge, LA (Battle for the Rag)	L 27–41	46,000	
December 21	USC*	Tulane Stadium; New Orleans, LA	L 13–20	25,000	
*Non-conference game; Rankings from AP Poll released prior to the game

== After the season ==
The 1947 NFL draft was held on December 16, 1946. The following Green Wave player was selected.

Round	Pick	Player	Position	NFL Club
30	276	Howard McAfee	Tackle	Detroit Lions
