= Bob David (American football) =

American football player (1921–1997)

No. 88,
- Positions: Guard, fullback

Personal information
- Born: January 15, 1921; Blue Island, Illinois, U.S.
- Died: July 4, 1997 (aged 76)
- Listed height: 6 ft 0 in (1.83 m)
- Listed weight: 219 lb (99 kg)

Career information
- High school: Mount Carmel (IL)
- NFL draft: 1947: 27th round, 253rd overall pick

Career history
- Los Angeles Rams (1947-1948); Chicago Rockets (1948)

Career NFL statistics
- Games: 14
- Stats at Pro Football Reference

Robert Joseph David (January 15, 1921 – July 4, 1997) was an American professional football player who was a guard and fullback in the National Football League (NFL) and All-America Football Conference (AAFC). He played college football for the Villanova Wildcats and Notre Dame Fighting Irish and professionally for the Los Angeles Rams and Chicago Rockets.

== Early life ==
David was born in 1921 in Blue Island, Illinois. He began his collegiate career at the University of Notre Dame as a football candidate. After his freshman year at Notre Dame, he was inducted into the United States Marine Corps during World War II and was transferred in 1943 to Villanova University as a trainee in the V-12 program.

He played college football at the fullback position for Villanova. While playing for Villanova in 1944, and despite appearing in only five games before being transferred to Camp Lejeune for active military service, he was selected for the 1944 All-Catholic All-America team. He rejoined Villanova in the fall of 1946 after being discharged from the Marine Corps.

== Professional football ==
David was selected by the Los Angeles Rams in the 27th round (253rd overall pick) of the 1947 NFL draft. He appeared in eight games for the Rams in 1947 and three games in 1948. He finished the 1948 season with the Chicago Rockets of the All-America Football Conference. He appeared in four games for the Rockets.

== Later life ==
David died in 1997 at age 76.
