= 1946 Washington Huskies football team =

American college football season

1946 Washington Huskies football
- Conference: Pacific Coast Conference
- Record: 5–4 (5–3 PCC)
- Head coach: Ralph Welch (5th season)
- Assistant coach: Art McLarney
- Captain: John Zeger
- Home stadium: University of Washington Stadium

1946 Pacific Coast Conference football standings
	Conf.					Overall
Team	W		L		T	W		L		T
No. 4 UCLA $	7	–	0	–	0	10	–	1	–	0
Oregon State	6	–	1	–	1	7	–	1	–	1
USC	5	–	2	–	0	6	–	4	–	0
Washington	5	–	3	–	0	5	–	4	–	0
Stanford	3	–	3	–	1	6	–	3	–	1
Oregon	3	–	4	–	1	4	–	4	–	1
Montana	1	–	3	–	0	4	–	4	–	0
Washington State	1	–	5	–	1	1	–	6	–	1
California	1	–	6	–	0	2	–	7	–	0
Idaho	0	–	5	–	0	1	–	8	–	0
$ – Conference champion; Rankings from AP Poll

The 1946 Washington Huskies football team was an American football team that represented the University of Washington in the Pacific Coast Conference (PCC) during the 1946 college football season. In its fifth season under head coach Ralph "Pest" Welch, the team compiled a 5–4 record (5–3 against PCC opponents), finished in fourth place in the PCC, and outscored its opponents by a total of 144 to 140.

Guard "Pappy" John Zeger was elected as the honorary team captain. Halfback Freddy Provo, who suffered severe shrapnel wounds in World War II, won the award as the team's most inspirational player. Two Washington players received first-team honors from the Associated Press (AP) or United Press (UP) on the 1946 All-Pacific Coast football team: Zegar at guard and Dick Hagen at end.

Washington was ranked at No. 70 in the final Litkenhous Difference by Score System rankings for 1946.

== Schedule ==
Date	Opponent	Site	Result	Attendance	Source
September 28	Saint Mary's*	University of Washington Stadium; Seattle, WA	L 20–24	43,000	
October 5	UCLA	University of Washington Stadium; Seattle, WA	L 13–39	43,000	
October 12	at Washington State	Rogers Field; Pullman, WA (rivalry)	W 21–7	26,000	
October 19	at USC	Los Angeles Memorial Coliseum; Los Angeles, CA	L 0–28	42,500	
October 26	California	University of Washington Stadium; Seattle, WA	W 20–6	35,000	
November 9	at Stanford	Stanford Stadium; Stanford, CA	W 21–15	25,000	
November 16	Oregon	University of Washington Stadium; Seattle, WA (rivalry)	W 16–0	34,000	
November 23	Montana	University of Washington Stadium; Seattle, WA	W 21–0	7,000	
November 30	vs. Oregon State	Multnomah Stadium; Portland, OR	L 12–21	26,808	
*Non-conference game

== Personnel ==
=== Players ===
- Hjalmer Anderson, end
- Gerry Austin, quarterback
- George Bayer, tackle
- Gordon Berlin, center
- Gail Bruce, end
- Wes Carlson, guard
- Chuck Coatney, tackle
- Marshall Dallas, fullback
- Carl Fennema, center
- Pete Foster, tackle
- Dick Hagen, end
- Herb Harlow, halfback
- Alf Hemstad, quarterback
- Gordon Hungar, halfback
- Bruce Jaton, center
- Whitey King, halfback
- Bob Levenhagen, guard
- Bill McGovern, center
- Hank Melusky, end
- George Meyers, guard
- Bob Mikalson, fullback
- Bob Nelson, end
- Fred Osterhout, guard
- Dick Ottele, quarterback
- Fred Provo, halfback
- Harry Rice, tackle
- Sam Robinson, halfback
- Ernie Stein, end
- Dmitri Tadich, tackle
- Jim Thompson, quarterback
- Jack Tracy, end
- Dick Watson, guard
- Arnie Weinmeister, fullback
- John Zeger, guard

=== Coaching staff ===
- Head coach: Ralph "Pest" Welch
- Assistant coaches: Roy Sandberg (assistant coach), Red Badgro (end coach), Art McLarney (assistant coach), Johnny Cherberg (backfield coach), Bill Haroldson (line coach)

== Professional football draft selections ==
Four University of Washington Huskies were selected in the 1947 NFL draft, which lasted 32 rounds with 300 selections. One of those Huskies was also selected in the 1947 AAFC Draft, which lasted 25 rounds with 186 selections.

= Husky Hall of Fame

League	Player	Position	Round	Pick	Club
NFL	Bill McGovern	Center	8	8	Los Angeles Rams
NFL	Larry Hatch	Back	11	10	Chicago Bears
NFL	Dick Hagen	End	14	1	Detroit Lions
NFL	Gordon Berlin	Center	24	10	Chicago Bears
AAFC	Dick Hagen	End	19	3	Brooklyn Dodgers
