= Bill Smyth (American football) =

American football player (1922–1966)

- Bill Smyth, c. 1941

No. 79
- Positions: End, tackle

Personal information
- Born: April 8, 1922; Batavia, Ohio, U.S.
- Died: November 6, 1966 (aged 44); Ottawa, Ontario, Canada
- Listed height: 6 ft 3 in (1.91 m)
- Listed weight: 243 lb (110 kg)

Career information
- High school: Roger Bacon (OH)
- College: Notre Dame (1940–1941); Cincinnati (1942); Penn State (1943, V-12); Marine All-Stars (1945); Cincinnati (1946)
- NFL draft: 1947: 7th round, 53rd overall pick

Career history

Playing
- Los Angeles Rams (1947–1950)

Coaching
- Xavier (1952–); Ottawa Rough Riders (1956–1966)

Career NFL statistics
- Games: 46
- Stats at Pro Football Reference

William Krantz Smyth (April 8, 1922 – November 6, 1966) was an American professional football player and coach. He played college football for Notre Dame (1940–1941), Cincinnati (1942), and Penn State, and had his college career interrupted by service in the United States Marine Corps during World War II. He played for the Los Angeles Rams from 1947 to 1950 and was an assistant coach for the Ottawa Rough Riders from 1956 to 1966.

== Early life ==
Smyth was born in 1922 in Batavia, Ohio. He attended Roger Bacon High School in St. Bernard, Ohio, a village located within Cincinnati. At Roger Bacon, he won varsity letters in football, basketball, track, and baseball.

== College and military service ==
In September 1940, he enrolled at Notre Dame University. At Notre Dame, he played for the freshman football team in 1940 and for the varsity as a reserve end in 1941. In 1942, he transferred to the University of Cincinnati and played for the 1942 Cincinnati Bearcats football team while they compiled a record of 8 wins and 2 losses.

In 1943, Smyth enlisted in the U.S. Marine Corps and was assigned to the V-12 Navy College Training Program at Pennsylvania State University. He played for the 1943 Penn State Nittany Lions football team. Smyth later served in the Pacific Theatre of World War II and participated in the first day landings in the Battle of Iwo Jima. In the fall of 1945, he played for the Marines All-Star football team. He returned to Cincinnati after the war and played for the 1946 Cincinnati Bearcats football team that compiled a 9–2 record.

== Professional football ==
Smyth was selected by the Los Angeles Rams in the seventh round (53rd overall pick) of the 1947 NFL draft. He signed with the Rams in January 1947, and he appeared in 46 games with the club in four seasons from 1947 to 1950. He caught 13 passes for 123 yards and one touchdown.

== Coaching career and death ==
After his playing career ended, Smyth worked as a football coach. He began his coaching career in 1951 as an assistant coach at Withrow High School in Cincinnati. In 1952, Smyth was hired as the line coach at Xavier University of Cincinnati.

He later served as an assistant coach for the Ottawa Rough Riders of the Canadian Football League for 11 seasons from 1956 to 1966. He died of acute heart failure in 1966 at age 44 in Ottawa. In July 1967, the Rough Riders celebrated Bill Smyth Night and paid tribute to the former coach before a crowd of 13,000 fans.
