= Bill Bass =

American gridiron football player (1921–1967)

Profile
- Position: Running back

Personal information
- Born: 1921; Greensboro, North Carolina, U.S.
- Died: September 28, 1967 (aged 45); Tillsonburg, Ontario, Canada
- Listed height: 5 ft 10 in (1.78 m)
- Listed weight: 180 lb (82 kg)

Career information
- College: University of Nevada, Reno & Tennessee State University

Career history
- 1947: Chicago Rockets
- 1948: Montreal Alouettes
- 1950–53: Toronto Argonauts
- 1954: Ottawa Rough Riders
- 1955: Toronto Balmy Beach Beachers

Awards and highlights
- 2× Grey Cup champion (1950, 1952); CFL All-Star (1951)

William Bass (1921 – September 28, 1967) was an all-star and Grey Cup champion running back in the Canadian Football League and one of the first players to break the colour barrier in Canadian football.

Bass attended University of Nevada, Reno and Tennessee State University, and was surrounded in controversy when a Nevada, Reno game was canceled because Mississippi State University's football team would not play them because Bass (and another teammate) were "Negroes". He started his pro career with the Chicago Rockets of the AAFC, where in 1947 he rushed for 44 yards and caught 8 passes for 79 yards.

In 1948, Bass moved to Canada, where he played 11 games with the Montreal Alouettes. After trying out with the Rockets in 1949, he returned to Canada, signing with the Toronto Argonauts, where he would play 45 regular season and 9 playoff games in 4 seasons, also being selected an All-Star in 1951. As a squad captain, Bass was a key figure in the Argonaut teams that won the 1950 and 1952 Grey Cup titles. After import player rules cost him his position with the Boatmen, he played 1954 with the Ottawa Rough Riders and was player coach with the amateur Toronto Balmy Beach Beachers in his final season.

Bill Bass was one of the first group of African-American players to break the colour barrier in Canadian football, following the path blazed by Herb Trawick. He settled in Ontario, and for the last six years of his life was physical education supervisor at Delhi District Secondary School. He died of a heart attack at his home in Tillsonberg on September 28, 1967, at the age of 45.
