= 1946 Tennessee Volunteers football team =

American college football season

1946 Tennessee Volunteers football

SEC co-champion

Orange Bowl, L 0–8 vs. Rice
- Conference: Southeastern Conference

Ranking
- AP: No. 7
- Record: 9–2 (5–0 SEC)
- Head coach: Robert Neyland (15th season)
- Offensive scheme: Single-wing
- Home stadium: Shields–Watkins Field

1946 Southeastern Conference football standings
	Conf.					Overall
Team	W		L		T	W		L		T
No. 3 Georgia +	5	–	0	–	0	11	–	0	–	0
No. 7 Tennessee +	5	–	0	–	0	9	–	2	–	0
No. 8 LSU	5	–	1	–	0	9	–	1	–	1
No. 11 Georgia Tech	4	–	2	–	0	9	–	2	–	0
Mississippi State	3	–	2	–	0	8	–	2	–	0
Alabama	4	–	3	–	0	7	–	4	–	0
Vanderbilt	3	–	4	–	0	5	–	4	–	0
Kentucky	2	–	3	–	0	7	–	3	–	0
Tulane	2	–	4	–	0	3	–	7	–	0
Auburn	1	–	5	–	0	4	–	6	–	0
Ole Miss	1	–	6	–	0	2	–	7	–	0
Florida	0	–	5	–	0	0	–	9	–	0
$ – Conference champion; Rankings from AP Poll

The 1946 Tennessee Volunteers (variously Tennessee, UT, or the Vols) represented the University of Tennessee in the 1946 college football season. Playing as a member of the Southeastern Conference (SEC), the team was led by head coach Robert Neyland, in his 15th season (his first since the 1940 season, following his service in World War II), and played their home games at Shields–Watkins Field in Knoxville, Tennessee. They finished the season with a record of nine wins and two losses (9–2 overall, 5–0 in the SEC). They concluded the season as SEC champions and with a loss against Rice in the 1947 Orange Bowl.

== Schedule ==
Date	Opponent	Rank	Site	Result	Attendance	Source
September 28	Georgia Tech		Shields–Watkins Field; Knoxville, TN (rivalry)	W 13–9	36,000	
October 5	at Duke*		Duke Stadium; Durham, NC	W 12–7	42,000	
October 12	Chattanooga*	No. 8	Shields–Watkins Field; Knoxville, TN	W 47–7	22,000	
October 19	No. 7 Alabama^{†}	No. 9	Shields–Watkins Field; Knoxville, TN (Third Saturday in October)	W 12–0	40,000	
October 26	Wake Forest*	No. 4	Shields–Watkins Field; Knoxville, TN	L 6–19	25,000	
November 2	No. 9 North Carolina*	No. 10	Shields–Watkins Field; Knoxville, TN	W 20–14	35,000	
November 9	vs. Ole Miss	No. 7	Crump Stadium; Memphis, TN (rivalry)	W 18–14	25,000	
November 16	at Boston College*	No. 8	Braves Field; Boston, MA	W 33–13	38,000	
November 23	Kentucky	No. 7	Shields–Watkins Field; Knoxville, TN (rivalry)	W 7–0	35,000	
November 30	at Vanderbilt	No. 8	Dudley Field; Nashville, TN (rivalry)	W 7–6	21,000	
January 1	vs. No. 10 Rice	No. 7	Burdine Stadium; Miami, FL (Orange Bowl)	L 0–8	36,152	
*Non-conference game; ^{†}Homecoming; Rankings from AP Poll released prior to the game

== Rankings ==
Ranking movements Legend: ██ Increase in ranking ██ Decrease in ranking т = Tied with team above or below ( ) = First-place votes
	Week								
Poll	1	2	3	4	5	6	7	8	Final
AP	8т	9	4 (6)	10	7	8	7	8 (1)	7

== After the season ==
The 1947 NFL draft was held on December 16, 1946. The following Volunteers were selected.

Round	Pick	Player	Position	NFL club
9	73	Max Partin	Back	Los Angeles Rams
15	130	Denny Crawford	Tackle	Green Bay Packers
16	139	Billy Gold	Back	Washington Redskins
27	246	Bill Hillman	Back	Detroit Lions
