= Bill Healy =

American football player (1924–2010)

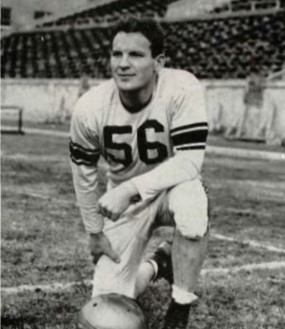
- Healy in the 1947 season

Profile
- Position: Guard

Personal information
- Born: March 28, 1924; New Brunswick, New Jersey, U.S.
- Died: September 22, 2010 (aged 86); Chattanooga, Tennessee, U.S.

Career information
- High school: Baylor
- College: Georgia Tech (1942; 1946–1948)

Awards and highlights
- First-team All-American (1948); Third-team All-American (1947); 3× First-team All-SEC (1946, 1947, 1948)

William Raymond Healy (March 28, 1924 – September 22, 2010) was an All-American college football player for the Georgia Tech Yellow Jackets. He graduated from Baylor School in 1942 and served in the 88th Cavalry reconnaissance squadron in the European Theater during World War II. He was awarded the Silver Star and the Bronze Star for gallantry in action. At Georgia Tech, he was a five-sport letterman. He was a member of the Chattanooga Sports Hall of Fame, Georgia Tech Hall of Fame and the Georgia Sports Hall of Fame. Healy was selected by the Associated Press for an all-time SEC team in 1950.

He was drafted in the fifth round of the 1948 NFL draft by the Boston Yanks (29th overall) but never played in the NFL.
