= 1946 UCLA Bruins football team =

American college football season

1946 UCLA Bruins football

PCC champion

Rose Bowl, L 14–45 vs. Illinois
- Conference: Pacific Coast Conference

Ranking
- AP: No. 4
- Record: 10–1 (7–0 PCC)
- Head coach: Bert LaBrucherie (2nd season)
- Home stadium: Los Angeles Memorial Coliseum

1946 Pacific Coast Conference football standings
	Conf.					Overall
Team	W		L		T	W		L		T
No. 4 UCLA $	7	–	0	–	0	10	–	1	–	0
Oregon State	6	–	1	–	1	7	–	1	–	1
USC	5	–	2	–	0	6	–	4	–	0
Washington	5	–	3	–	0	5	–	4	–	0
Stanford	3	–	3	–	1	6	–	3	–	1
Oregon	3	–	4	–	1	4	–	4	–	1
Montana	1	–	3	–	0	4	–	4	–	0
Washington State	1	–	5	–	1	1	–	6	–	1
California	1	–	6	–	0	2	–	7	–	0
Idaho	0	–	5	–	0	1	–	8	–	0
$ – Conference champion; Rankings from AP Poll

The 1946 UCLA Bruins football team was an American football team that represented the University of California, Los Angeles in the Pacific Coast Conference (PCC) during the 1946 college football season. In their second year under head coach Bert LaBrucherie, the Bruins won all ten games in the regular season (7–0 in PCC, first), but lost 45–14 to Illinois in the Rose Bowl to finish at 10–1. Home games were played at the Los Angeles Memorial Coliseum.

The Bruins ranked fourth nationally in total offense, averaging 377.9 yards per game; and were ranked fifth nationally in rushing defense with an average 259.8 yards per game.

Ten UCLA players were selected by the Associated Press (AP) or United Press (UP) on the 1946 All-Pacific Coast football team: quarterback Ernie Case (AP-1, UP-1); end Burr Baldwin (AP-1, UP-1); tackle Don Malmberg (AP-1, UP-1); center/linebacker Don Paul (AP-1, UP-1); backs Jerry Shipkey (AP-2, UP-3), Cal Rossi (AP-3, UP-2), and Ernie Johnson (AP-3); tackle Bill Chambers (AP-2, UP-2); guard Mike Dimitro (AP-2, UP-3); and end Tom Fears (AP-3, UP-2).

== Schedule ==
Date	Opponent	Rank	Site	Result	Attendance	Source
September 28	Oregon State		Los Angeles Memorial Coliseum; Los Angeles, CA	W 50–7	48,650	
October 5	at Washington		Husky Stadium; Seattle, WA	W 39–13	43,000	
October 12	No. 17 Stanford	No. 5	Los Angeles Memorial Coliseum; Los Angeles, CA	W 26–6	90,803	
October 19	at California	No. 4	California Memorial Stadium; Berkeley, CA (rivalry)	W 13–6	65,000	
October 26	Santa Clara*	No. 5	Los Angeles Memorial Coliseum; Los Angeles, CA	W 33–7	36,000	
November 1	Saint Mary's*	No. 4	Los Angeles Memorial Coliseum; Los Angeles, CA	W 46–20	92,976	
November 9	at Oregon	No. 4	Multnomah Stadium; Portland, OR	W 14–0	30,000	
November 16	Montana	No. 4	Los Angeles Memorial Coliseum; Los Angeles, CA	W 61–7	23,000	
November 23	No. 10 USC	No. 4	Los Angeles Memorial Coliseum; Los Angeles, CA (Victory Bell)	W 13–6	93,714	
November 30	Nebraska*	No. 4	Los Angeles Memorial Coliseum; Los Angeles, CA	W 18–0	52,558	
January 1, 1947	vs. Illinois*	No. 4	Rose Bowl; Pasadena, CA (Rose Bowl)	L 14–45	93,083	
*Non-conference game; Rankings from AP Poll released prior to the game

== Rankings ==
Ranking movements Legend: ██ Increase in ranking ██ Decrease in ranking ( ) = First-place votes
	Week								
Poll	1	2	3	4	5	6	7	8	Final
AP	5 (1)	4 (5)	5 (2)	4 (1)	4 (3)	4 (7)	4 (5)	4 (5)	4 (2)

== After the season ==
The 1947 NFL draft was held on December 16, 1946. The following Bruins were selected.

Round	Pick	Player	Position	NFL club
1	4	Cal Rossi	Back	Washington Redskins
1	6	Ernie Case	Quarterback	Green Bay Packers
3	20	Burr Baldwin	End	Green Bay Packers
3	21	Don Paul	Linebacker	Los Angeles Rams
8	58	Jerry Shipkey	Linebacker	Pittsburgh Steelers
9	68	Roy Kurrasch	End	Washington Redskins
13	113	Mike Dimitro	Guard	Los Angeles Rams
20	183	Ben Reiges	Back	Los Angeles Rams
21	193	Leon McLaughlin	Center	Los Angeles Rams
