= 1946 California Golden Bears football team =

American college football season

1946 California Golden Bears football
- Conference: Pacific Coast Conference
- Record: 2–7 (1–6 PCC)
- Head coach: Frank Wickhorst (1st season)
- Home stadium: California Memorial Stadium

1946 Pacific Coast Conference football standings
	Conf.					Overall
Team	W		L		T	W		L		T
No. 4 UCLA $	7	–	0	–	0	10	–	1	–	0
Oregon State	6	–	1	–	1	7	–	1	–	1
USC	5	–	2	–	0	6	–	4	–	0
Washington	5	–	3	–	0	5	–	4	–	0
Stanford	3	–	3	–	1	6	–	3	–	1
Oregon	3	–	4	–	1	4	–	4	–	1
Montana	1	–	3	–	0	4	–	4	–	0
Washington State	1	–	5	–	1	1	–	6	–	1
California	1	–	6	–	0	2	–	7	–	0
Idaho	0	–	5	–	0	1	–	8	–	0
$ – Conference champion; Rankings from AP Poll

The 1946 California Golden Bears football team was an American football team that represented the University of California in the Pacific Coast Conference (PCC) during the 1946 college football season. In their only season under head coach Frank Wickhorst, the Golden Bears compiled a 2–7 record (1–6 in PCC, eighth) and were outscored 169 to 112. Seven games were played on campus at California Memorial Stadium in Berkeley, California.

California was ranked at No. 79 in the final Litkenhous Difference by Score System rankings for 1946.

== Schedule ==
Date	Opponent	Site	Result	Attendance	Source
September 28	Wisconsin*	California Memorial Stadium; Berkeley, CA	L 7–28	50,000	
October 5	Oregon	California Memorial Stadium; Berkeley, CA	L 13–14	25,000	
October 12	No. 16 Saint Mary's*	California Memorial Stadium; Berkeley, CA	W 20–13		
October 19	No. 4 UCLA	California Memorial Stadium; Berkeley, CA (rivalry)	L 6–13	65,000	
October 26	at Washington	Husky Stadium; Seattle, WA	L 6–20	35,000	
November 2	Washington State	California Memorial Stadium; Berkeley, CA	W 47–14	30,000	
November 9	at No. 14 USC	Los Angeles Memorial Coliseum; Los Angeles, CA	L 0–14	60,398	
November 16	Oregon State	California Memorial Stadium; Berkeley, CA	L 7–28	25,000	
November 23	Stanford	California Memorial Stadium; Berkeley, CA (Big Game)	L 6–25	81,000	
*Non-conference game; Rankings from AP Poll released prior to the game

== After the season ==
The 1947 NFL draft was held on December 16, 1946. The following Golden Bears were selected.

Round	Pick	Player	Position	NFL club
14	125	Jim Turner	Tackle	Chicago Bears
23	211	Ron Sockolov	Tackle	Green Bay Packers
25	233	Bob Dal Porto	Back	Los Angeles Rams
25	235	John Cunningham	End	Chicago Bears
