= 1946 Saint Mary's Gaels football team =

American college football season

1946 Saint Mary's Gaels football

Oil Bowl, L 19–41 vs. Georgia Tech
- Conference: Independent
- Record: 6–3
- Head coach: James Phelan (5th season)
- Home stadium: Kezar Stadium

1946 Western major college football independents records
	Conf.			Overall
Team	W	L	T	W		L		T
Nevada		–		7	–	2	–	0
Saint Mary's		–		6	–	3	–	0
San Francisco		–		3	–	6	–	0
Santa Clara		–		2	–	5	–	1
Portland		–		1	–	5	–	1

The 1946 Saint Mary's Gaels football team was an American football team that represented Saint Mary's College of California during the 1946 college football season. In their fifth season under head coach James Phelan, the Gaels compiled a 6–3 record and were outscored by opponents by a combined total of 229 to 160.

The team was led on offense by Herman Wedemeyer who ranked seventh in the nation with 1,220 yards of total offense—625 rushing yards and 595 passing yards. He was selected by both the United Press and the Associated Press as a first-team halfback on the 1946 All-Pacific Coast football team. In 1979, Wedemeyer was inducted into the College Football Hall of Fame.

Saint Mary's was ranked at No. 72 in the final Litkenhous Difference by Score System rankings for 1946.

== Schedule ==
Date	Opponent	Rank	Site	Result	Attendance	Source
September 28	at Washington		Husky Stadium; Seattle WA	W 24–20	43,000	
October 6	Alameda Naval Air Station		Kezar Stadium; San Francisco, CA	W 73–0		
October 12	at California	No. 16	California Memorial Stadium; Berkeley, CA	L 13–20		
October 19	at Fordham		Polo Grounds; New York, NY	W 33–2	30,798	
October 27	Nevada		Kezar Stadium; San Francisco, CA	W 13–12	50,000	
November 1	at No. 4 UCLA		Los Angeles Memorial Coliseum; Los Angeles, CA	L 20–46	92,976	
November 16	vs. Santa Clara		Kezar Stadium; San Francisco, CA	W 28–19	55,000	
November 30	vs. San Francisco		Kezar Stadium; San Francisco, CA	W 6–0	50,000	
January 1, 1947	vs. No. 11 Georgia Tech		Rice Stadium; Houston, TX (Oil Bowl)	L 19–41	22,000	
Rankings from AP Poll released prior to the game

== Rankings ==
Ranking movements Legend: ██ Increase in ranking ██ Decrease in ranking — = Not ranked
	Week								
Poll	1	2	3	4	5	6	7	8	Final
AP	16	—	—	—	—	—	—	—	—

== After the season ==
The 1947 NFL draft was held on December 16, 1946. The following Gael was selected.

Round	Pick	Player	Position	NFL club
1	9	Herman Wedemeyer	Back	Los Angeles Rams
