= 1946 Georgia Bulldogs football team =

American college football season

1946 Georgia Bulldogs football

National champion (Williamson) SEC co-champion Sugar Bowl champion

Sugar Bowl, W 20–10 vs. North Carolina
- Conference: Southeastern Conference

Ranking
- AP: No. 3
- Record: 11–0 (5–0 SEC)
- Head coach: Wally Butts (8th season)
- Home stadium: Sanford Stadium

1946 Southeastern Conference football standings
	Conf.					Overall
Team	W		L		T	W		L		T
No. 3 Georgia +	5	–	0	–	0	11	–	0	–	0
No. 7 Tennessee +	5	–	0	–	0	9	–	2	–	0
No. 8 LSU	5	–	1	–	0	9	–	1	–	1
No. 11 Georgia Tech	4	–	2	–	0	9	–	2	–	0
Mississippi State	3	–	2	–	0	8	–	2	–	0
Alabama	4	–	3	–	0	7	–	4	–	0
Vanderbilt	3	–	4	–	0	5	–	4	–	0
Kentucky	2	–	3	–	0	7	–	3	–	0
Tulane	2	–	4	–	0	3	–	7	–	0
Auburn	1	–	5	–	0	4	–	6	–	0
Ole Miss	1	–	6	–	0	2	–	7	–	0
Florida	0	–	5	–	0	0	–	9	–	0
$ – Conference champion; Rankings from AP Poll

The 1946 Georgia Bulldogs football team was an American football team that represented the University of Georgia in the Southeastern Conference (SEC) during the 1946 college football season. In their eighth year under head coach Wally Butts, the Bulldogs compiled a perfect 11–0 record, outscored opponents by a total of 392 to 110, and tied for the SEC championship.

The Bulldogs ranked second nationally in total offense with an average of 394.6 yards per game. They also ranked second nationally in passing offense with an average of 173.7 passing yards per game.

The team played its home games at Sanford Stadium in Athens, Georgia.

== Schedule ==
Date	Opponent	Rank	Site	Result	Attendance	Source
September 27	Clemson*		Sanford Stadium; Athens, GA (rivalry)	W 35–12	35,000	
October 4	at Temple*		Temple Stadium; Philadelphia, PA	W 35–7	35,000	
October 11	No. 19 Kentucky	No. 8	Sanford Stadium; Athens, GA	W 28–13	25,000	
October 19	Oklahoma A&M*	No. 8	Sanford Stadium; Athens, GA	W 33–13	35,000	
October 26	at Furman*	No. 8	Sirrine Stadium; Greenville, SC	W 70–7	12,000	
November 2	at No. 15 Alabama	No. 5	Sanford Stadium; Athens, GA (rivalry)	W 14–0	52,000	
November 9	vs. Florida	No. 3	Municipal Stadium; Jacksonville, FL (rivalry)	W 33–14	23,000	
November 16	vs. Auburn	No. 3	A. J. McClung Memorial Stadium; Columbus, GA (Deep South's Oldest Rivalry)	W 41–0	22,000	
November 23	at Chattanooga*	No. 3	Chamberlain Field; Chattanooga, TN	W 48–27	10,000	
November 30	No. 7 Georgia Tech^{†}	No. 3	Sanford Stadium; Athens, GA (Clean, Old-Fashioned Hate)	W 35–7	55,000	
January 1, 1947	vs. No. 9 North Carolina*	No. 3	Tulane Stadium; New Orleans, LA (Sugar Bowl)	W 20–10	73,300	
*Non-conference game; ^{†}Homecoming; Rankings from AP Poll released prior to the game

== Rankings ==
Ranking movements Legend: ██ Increase in ranking ██ Decrease in ranking т = Tied with team above or below ( ) = First-place votes
	Week								
Poll	1	2	3	4	5	6	7	8	Final
AP	8т	8	7	5 (1)	3 (6)	3 (12)	3 (8)	3 (5)	3 (23)

== Claim to national championship ==
In the final AP Poll released in early December, Georgia was ranked No. 3 with 1,294 points, behind No. 1 Notre Dame with 1,730-1/2 points and No. 2 Army with 1,659-1/2 points. After the final AP Poll was issued, the Bulldogs defeated No. 9 North Carolina, 20–10, in the 1947 Sugar Bowl. Neither Army nor Notre Dame played in a bowl game, and Georgia was the only one of the top three teams with an unblemished record. In later analyses, Georgia was recognized as the 1946 national champion under the Williamson System.

== Key players and awards ==
At the end of the season, Georgia halfback Charley Trippi won the Maxwell Award as the best player in college football. He was also selected as the SEC Player of the Year, finished second in voting for the Heisman Trophy, and was a consensus first-team selection on the 1946 All-America college football team. Trippi ranked fourth nationally in total offense with 1,366 yards and eighth nationally in rushing with 744 yards.

Guard Herbert St. John was selected by the United Press (UP) and Associated Press (AP) as a first-team player on the 1946 All-SEC football team. Quarterback John Rauch received third-team All-SEC honors from the UP. Trippi and Rauch were both inducted into the College Football Hall of Fame.

== 1947 NFL draft ==
The 1947 NFL draft was held on December 16, 1946. The following Bulldogs were selected.

Round	Pick	Player	Position	NFL club
7	55	Reid Moseley	End	Chicago Bears
16	142	Charles Smith	Halfback	Chicago Cardinals
24	220	Herbert St. John	Guard	Green Bay Packers
29	271	Ray Sellers	End	Green Bay Packers
30	284	John Wright	Back	New York Giants
