= Hal Dean =

American football player (1922–2011)

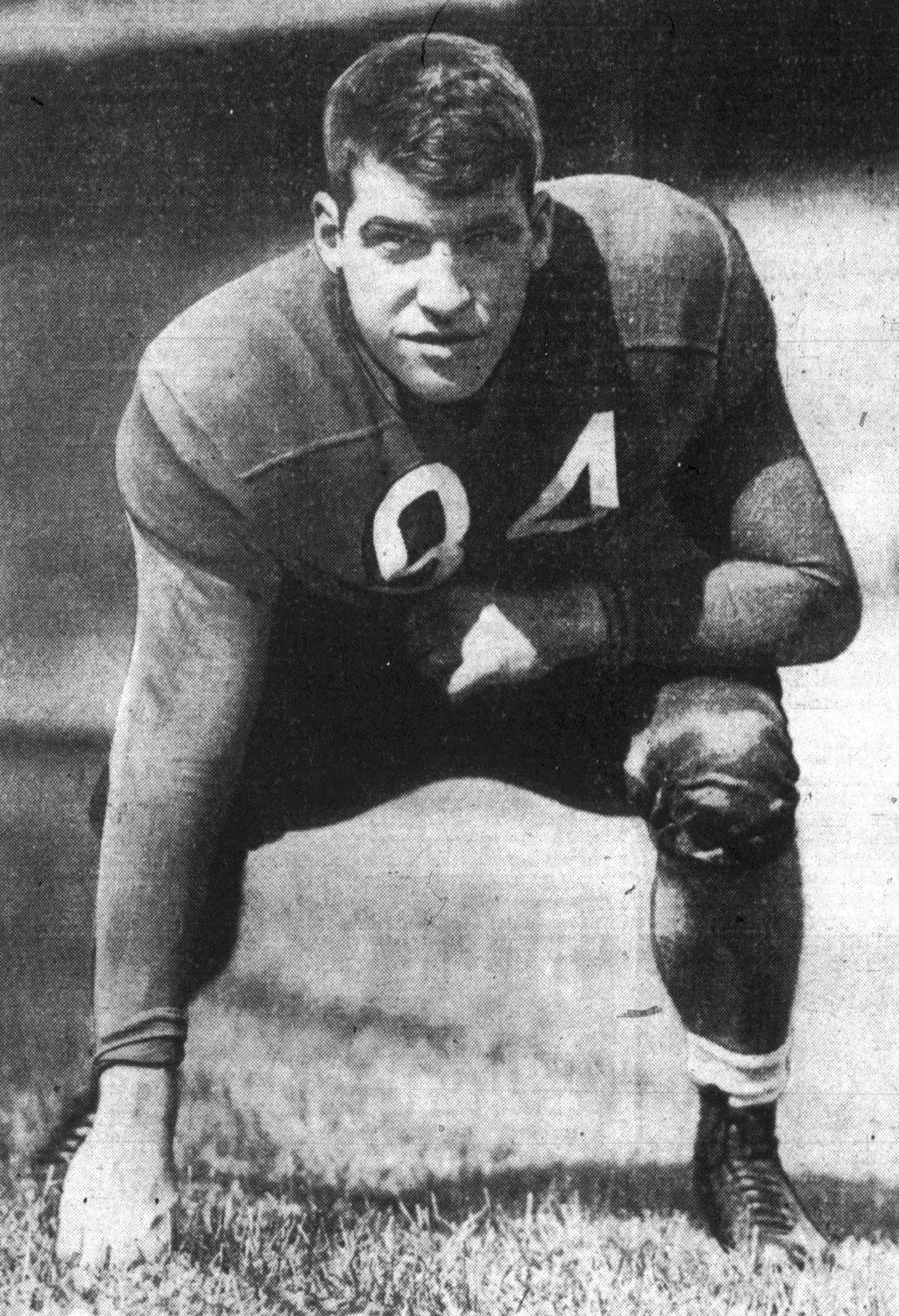
- Dean, circa 1946

No. 84
- Positions: Guard, linebacker

Personal information
- Born: October 30, 1922; Wooster, Ohio, U.S.
- Died: February 12, 2011 (aged 88); Midland, Texas, U.S.
- Listed height: 6 ft 0 in (1.83 m)
- Listed weight: 205 lb (93 kg)

Career information
- High school: Wooster
- College: Ohio State (1940-1942, 1946)
- NFL draft: 1947: 30th round, 283rd overall pick

Career history
- Los Angeles Rams (1947–1949)

Awards and highlights
- National champion (1942)

Career NFL statistics
- Games played: 35
- Games started: 24
- Fumble recoveries: 4
- Stats at Pro Football Reference

Hal Stone Dean (October 30, 1922 – February 12, 2011) was a left guard for the Los Angeles Rams in the National Football League (NFL), playing three seasons from 1947 to 1949.

== Early life ==
Hal was born to Forest William Dean and Vernon Stone Dean in Wooster, Ohio. He attended a one-room schoolhouse through the eighth grade. At the age of 15, Hal earned his Eagle Scout badge. He attended Wooster High School and was co-caption of the football team.

== College and military service ==
After graduating from Wooster High School in 1940, Hal enrolled at Ohio State University in Columbus, Ohio, earning a B.S. degree (1947) in Geology. While at Ohio State, Hal played football for the Buckeyes under Pro Football Hall of Fame coach Paul Brown. Starting every game at left guard, Hal was a member of the Ohio State 1942 team that won the Big Ten and the NCAA National Championship football titles. He was also a member of Sigma Alpha Epsilon fraternity and the Advanced ROTC at Ohio State.

In December 1942, Hal was ordered to Fort Hayes in Columbus, Ohio for active duty. He attended the United States Army Infantry School in Ft. Benning, Georgia, receiving his Paratroop Wings. In August 1944, Hal was assigned to the 541st Parachute Regiment at Camp Mackall, North Carolina. Initially, he was ordered to Ft. Meade, Maryland to depart for the European Theater but after Allied victories, he was sent to Ft. Ord, California to depart for the Pacific Theater. He arrived in the city of Manila, Philippines shortly after the Japanese had been defeated, working patrol duty and searching for Japanese hideouts. He joined the 187th Regiment, 11th Airborne Division and began intensive airborne training at Lipa in the Luzon, Philippines, in preparation for the invasion of the mainland of Japan. In August 1945, following the bombing of Hiroshima and Nagasaki, Hal's regiment was immediately airlifted to Okinawa to prepare to invade the Japanese at Atsugi Airfield in Tokyo, Japan and was among the first troops to land on the Japanese homeland. Hal was captain of the 11th Airborne Division football team that won the All-Pacific title. In May 1946, Hal returned to the United States and was discharged from the military as company commander and captain 1st Battalion, 187th Glider Infantry Regiment, 11th Airborne Division. He earned two Bronze Star Medals for his military service.

Hal was voted to the All-Big Ten team when he returned to the Ohio State campus in 1946. He was mentioned on several All-America selections and played in the East–West Shrine Game. Hal was also inducted into SPHINX, a senior honorary society.

== Professional football career ==
In June 1947, Hal married his high school sweetheart Estella "Stella" Graber. They moved to Los Angeles after Hal was drafted in the 30th round of the 1947 NFL draft by the Los Angeles Rams.

Hal played for the Los Angeles Rams during the 1947, 1948, and 1949 seasons, and was a member of the NFL Western Division Championship team. Hal played in the 1949 NFL Championship Game, predecessor to the modern Super Bowl. During the off-season, he attended Stanford University in Palo Alto, California to pursue his M.S. degree (1950) in Geology.

== Oil and gas career ==
After graduation, Hal and Stella moved to San Antonio, Texas for his first oil geology position with Magnolia Petroleum Corp. Five years later, he joined Pauley Petroleum, owned by Ed Pauley.

In 1960, Hal moved his family to Midland, Texas and opened an office for El Paso Natural Gas. He also worked in Midland as district manager for Apache Corporation and Union Texas Petroleum. He eventually became an independent explorer in partnership with Bill Moss and J. Howard Marshall, forming the Petroleum Corporation, which explored for oil and gas in West Texas and New Mexico. He continued working as an independent geologist until his death.

In 1970, Hal had the honor of inducting his former Los Angeles Rams teammate, Tom Fears, into the Pro Football Hall of Fame in Canton, Ohio. Hal and Stella later moved to Rancho Santa Fe, California. After Stella's death in 1987, Hal married Nancy Bartling. He eventually returned to Midland to be closer to his family and friends.

Hal was a member of the American Association of Petroleum Geologists, NFL Alumni, Ohio State Varsity O Hall of Fame, and an Emeritus Board Member of the Petroleum Investment Committee of Stanford University. He also established a fellowship in his name at Stanford University. Hal was a Sunday School teacher, Deacon, and Elder at First Presbyterian Church in Midland. He was inducted into the Wayne County, Ohio Sports Hall of Fame in June 1978 and enshrined in the Wooster, Ohio High School Sports Hall of Fame in 1986.
