= 1946 Oregon Ducks football team =

American college football season

1946 Oregon Ducks football
- Conference: Pacific Coast Conference
- Record: 4–4–1 (3–4–1 PCC)
- Head coach: Tex Oliver (6th season)
- Captain: Duke Iversen
- Home stadium: Hayward Field

1946 Pacific Coast Conference football standings
| | Conf. | | | | | Overall |
| Team | W | | L | | T | W | | L | | T |
|---|---|---|---|---|---|---|---|---|---|---|
| No. 4 UCLA $ | 7 | – | 0 | – | 0 | 10 | – | 1 | – | 0 |
| Oregon State | 6 | – | 1 | – | 1 | 7 | – | 1 | – | 1 |
| USC | 5 | – | 2 | – | 0 | 6 | – | 4 | – | 0 |
| Washington | 5 | – | 3 | – | 0 | 5 | – | 4 | – | 0 |
| Stanford | 3 | – | 3 | – | 1 | 6 | – | 3 | – | 1 |
| Oregon | 3 | – | 4 | – | 1 | 4 | – | 4 | – | 1 |
| Montana | 1 | – | 3 | – | 0 | 4 | – | 4 | – | 0 |
| Washington State | 1 | – | 5 | – | 1 | 1 | – | 6 | – | 1 |
| California | 1 | – | 6 | – | 0 | 2 | – | 7 | – | 0 |
| Idaho | 0 | – | 5 | – | 0 | 1 | – | 8 | – | 0 |
$ – Conference champion; Rankings from AP Poll

The 1946 Oregon Ducks football team was an American football team that represented the University of Oregon in the Pacific Coast Conference (PCC) during the 1946 college football season. In their sixth and final season under head coach Tex Oliver, the Ducks compiled a 4–4–1 record (3–4–1 in PCC, sixth), and were outscored 118 to 81. Home games were played on campus at Hayward Field in Eugene, Oregon.

Oregon was ranked at No. 99 in the final Litkenhous Difference by Score System rankings for 1946. Undefeated through October, Oregon did not score in November and lost four straight conference games.

== Schedule ==
| Date | Opponent | Rank | Site | Result | Attendance | Source |
|---|---|---|---|---|---|---|
| September 28 | Pacific (CA)* | | Hayward Field; Eugene, OR | W 7–6 | 10,000 | |
| October 5 | at California | | California Memorial Stadium; Berkeley, CA | W 14–13 | 25,000 | |
| October 12 | Montana | | Hayward Field; Eugene, OR | W 34–0 | | |
| October 19 | Washington State^{†} | | Hayward Field; Eugene, OR | T 0–0 | 18,000 | |
| October 26 | at Idaho | No. 19 | Neale Stadium; Moscow, ID | W 26–13 | 6,500 | |
| November 2 | at USC | | Los Angeles Memorial Coliseum; Los Angeles, CA | L 0–43 | 45,885 | |
| November 9 | No. 4 UCLA | | Hayward Field; Eugene, OR | L 0–14 | 30,000 | |
| November 16 | at Washington | | Husky Stadium; Seattle, WA (rivalry) | L 0–16 | 34,000 | |
| November 23 | at Oregon State | | Bell Field; Corvallis, OR (rivalry) | L 0–13 | 20,000 | |
*Non-conference game; ^{†}Homecoming; Rankings from AP Poll released prior to the game

== Rankings ==
Ranking movements Legend: ██ Increase in ranking ██ Decrease in ranking — = Not ranked
| | Week | | | | | | | | |
| Poll | 1 | 2 | 3 | 4 | 5 | 6 | 7 | 8 | Final |
|---|---|---|---|---|---|---|---|---|---|
| AP | — | — | 19 | — | — | — | — | — | — |

== After the season ==
The 1947 NFL draft was held on December 16, 1946. The following Webfoots were selected.

| Round | Pick | Player | Position | NFL Club |
|---|---|---|---|---|
| 7 | 54 | Duke Iversen | Back | New York Giants |
| 20 | 181 | Brad Ecklund | Center | Green Bay Packers |
| 22 | 203 | Charlie Elliott | Tackle | Los Angeles Rams |
