= 1946 USC Trojans football team =

American college football season

1946 USC Trojans football
- Conference: Pacific Coast Conference
- Record: 6–4 (5–2 PCC)
- Head coach: Jeff Cravath (5th season)
- Home stadium: Los Angeles Memorial Coliseum

1946 Pacific Coast Conference football standings
	Conf.					Overall
Team	W		L		T	W		L		T
No. 4 UCLA $	7	–	0	–	0	10	–	1	–	0
Oregon State	6	–	1	–	1	7	–	1	–	1
USC	5	–	2	–	0	6	–	4	–	0
Washington	5	–	3	–	0	5	–	4	–	0
Stanford	3	–	3	–	1	6	–	3	–	1
Oregon	3	–	4	–	1	4	–	4	–	1
Montana	1	–	3	–	0	4	–	4	–	0
Washington State	1	–	5	–	1	1	–	6	–	1
California	1	–	6	–	0	2	–	7	–	0
Idaho	0	–	5	–	0	1	–	8	–	0
$ – Conference champion; Rankings from AP Poll

The 1946 USC Trojans football team was an American football team that represented the University of Southern California (USC) in the Pacific Coast Conference (PCC) during the 1946 college football season. In their fifth year under head coach Jeff Cravath, the Trojans compiled a 6–4 record (5–2 against PCC opponents), finished in third place in the PCC, and outscored their opponents by a total of 158 to 106. The Trojans were ranked No. 10 in the AP Poll in mid-November before losing consecutive games against No. 4 UCLA and No. 2 Notre Dame.

Two USC players received first-team honors from the Associated Press (AP) or United Press (UP) on the 1946 All-Pacific Coast football team: tackle John Ferraro (AP-1, UP-1); and guard Mike Garzoni (AP-1).

USC was ranked at No. 37 in the final Litkenhous Difference by Score System rankings for 1946.

== Schedule ==
Date	Opponent	Rank	Site	Result	Attendance	Source
September 27	Washington State		Los Angeles Memorial Coliseum; Los Angeles, CA	W 13–7	68,282	
October 5	Ohio State*		Los Angeles Memorial Coliseum; Los Angeles, CA	L 0–21	80,047	
October 12	vs. Oregon State		Multnomah Stadium; Portland, OR	L 0–6	29,594	
October 19	Washington		Los Angeles Memorial Coliseum; Los Angeles, CA	W 28–0	42,507	
October 26	at Stanford		Stanford Stadium; Stanford, CA (rivalry)	W 28–20	45,000	
November 2	Oregon		Los Angeles Memorial Coliseum; Los Angeles, CA	W 43–0	45,885	
November 9	California	No. 14	Los Angeles Memorial Coliseum; Los Angeles, CA	W 14–0	60,398	
November 23	at No. 4 UCLA^{†}	No. 10	Los Angeles Memorial Coliseum; Los Angeles, CA (Victory Bell)	L 6–13	93,714	
November 30	at No. 2 Notre Dame*	No. 16	Notre Dame Stadium; Notre Dame, IN (rivalry)	L 6–26	55,298	
December 21	at Tulane*		Tulane Stadium; New Orleans, LA	W 20–13	25,000	
*Non-conference game; ^{†}Homecoming; Rankings from AP Poll released prior to the game

== Rankings ==
Ranking movements Legend: ██ Increase in ranking ██ Decrease in ranking — = Not ranked
	Week								
Poll	1	2	3	4	5	6	7	8	Final
AP	—	—	—	—	14	12	10	16	—

== 1947 NFL draft ==
The 1947 NFL draft was held on December 16, 1946. The following Trojans were selected.

Round	Pick	Player	Position	NFL club
5	33	Gordon Gray	Back	Los Angeles Rams
6	39	Mike Garzoni	Guard	Washington Redskins
16	141	Jim Callanan	End	Green Bay Packers
17	153	Don Hardy	End	Los Angeles Rams
