= 1946 Oregon State Beavers football team =

American college football season

1946 Oregon State Beavers football
- Head Coach Lon Stiner
- Conference: Pacific Coast Conference
- Record: 7–1–1 (6–1–1 PCC)
- Head coach: Lon Stiner (12th season)
- Home stadium: Bell Field; Multnomah Stadium

1946 Pacific Coast Conference football standings
	Conf.					Overall
Team	W		L		T	W		L		T
No. 4 UCLA $	7	–	0	–	0	10	–	1	–	0
Oregon State	6	–	1	–	1	7	–	1	–	1
USC	5	–	2	–	0	6	–	4	–	0
Washington	5	–	3	–	0	5	–	4	–	0
Stanford	3	–	3	–	1	6	–	3	–	1
Oregon	3	–	4	–	1	4	–	4	–	1
Montana	1	–	3	–	0	4	–	4	–	0
Washington State	1	–	5	–	1	1	–	6	–	1
California	1	–	6	–	0	2	–	7	–	0
Idaho	0	–	5	–	0	1	–	8	–	0
$ – Conference champion; Rankings from AP Poll

The 1946 Oregon State Beavers football team represented Oregon State College as a member of the Pacific Coast Conference (PCC) during the 1946 college football season. Led by 12th-year head coach Lon Stiner, the Beavers compiled an overall record of 7–1–1 record with a mark of 6–1–1 in conference play, placing second in the PCC, and outscored their opponents 157 to 81. Oregon State played four home games on campus at Bell Field in Corvallis and two at Multnomah Stadium in Portland.

Oregon State was ranked at No. 62 in the final Litkenhous Difference by Score System rankings for 1946.

== Schedule ==
Date	Opponent	Site	Result	Attendance	Source
September 28	at UCLA	Los Angeles Memorial Coliseum; Los Angeles, CA	L 7–50	48,650	
October 5	Portland	Bell Field; Corvallis, OR	W 35–0	9,000	
October 12	USC	Multnomah Stadium; Portland, OR	W 6–0	29,504	
October 26	at Washington State	Rogers Field; Pullman, WA	W 13–12	15,000	
November 2	Stanford	Bell Field; Corvallis, OR	T 0–0	17,000	
November 9	Idaho	Bell Field; Corvallis, OR	W 34–0	4,000	
November 16	at California	California Memorial Stadium; Berkeley, CA	W 28–7	25,000	
November 23	Oregon	Bell Field; Corvallis, OR	W 13–0	20,000	
November 30	Washington	Multnomah Stadium; Portland, OR	W 21–12	26,808	

== Coaching staff ==
- Jim Dixon, line
- Bob Dethman, backs
- Jim Kisselburgh
- Al Cox, junior varsity

== After the season ==
The 1947 NFL draft was held on December 16, 1946. The following Beavers were selected.

Round	Pick	Player	Position	NFL Club
6	43	Paul Evanson	Tackle	Los Angeles Rams
7	48	Bill Gray	Guard	Washington Redskins
