= Ed Champagne =

American football player (1921-2003)

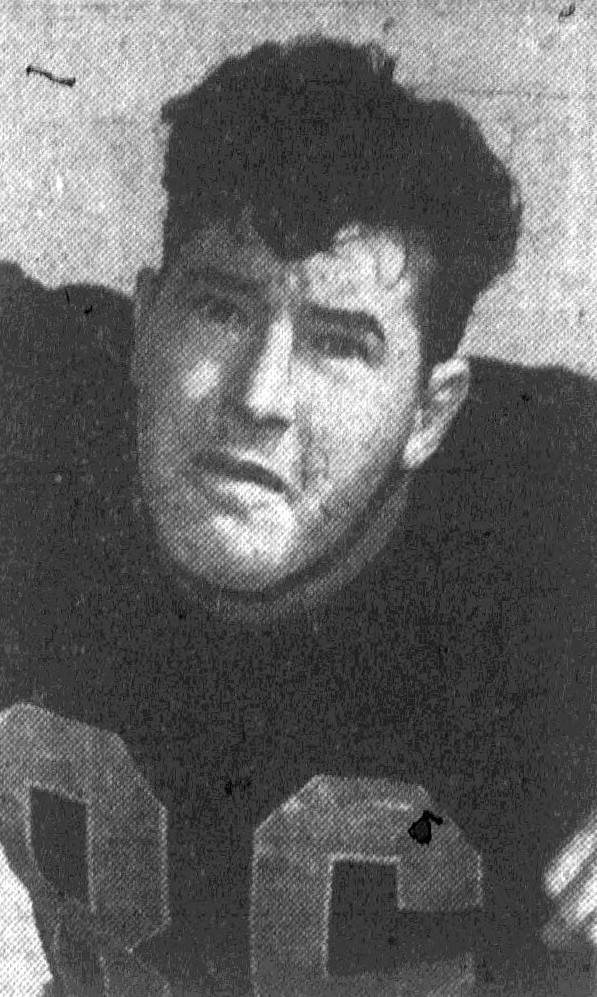
- Champagne, circa 1951

No. 86, 32
- Positions: Tackle, defensive tackle

Personal information
- Born: December 4, 1922; New Orleans, Louisiana, U.S.
- Died: June 15, 2003 (aged 80); Raleigh, North Carolina, U.S.
- Listed height: 6 ft 3 in (1.91 m)
- Listed weight: 236 lb (107 kg)

Career information
- College: LSU (1946)
- NFL draft: 1947: 18th round, 163rd overall pick

Career history

Playing
- Los Angeles Rams (1947–1950); Calgary Stampeders (1951)

Coaching
- Calgary Stampeders (1952) Assistant coach

Awards and highlights
- Second-team All-SEC (1946)

Career NFL statistics
- Receptions: 4
- Receiving yards: 52
- Touchdowns: 1
- Stats at Pro Football Reference

Edward J. Champagne (December 4, 1922 – June 15, 2003) was an American professional football player who played tackle in the National Football League (NFL) for the Los Angeles Rams. He attended Louisiana State University, where he played college football for the LSU Tigers football team. He played in 39 games for the Rams from 1947 to 1950. He scored the only touchdown of his NFL career—an eight-yard touchdown reception thrown by quarterback Norm Van Brocklin—in the first week of his final season.

After the 1950 NFL Championship Game, Champagne signed a contract with the Calgary Stampeders. He played one season in Canada but injured his neck and retired from pro football.
