= Ted Cook (American football) =

American football player (1922–2006)

No. 20, 48
- Positions: End, defensive back

Personal information
- Born: February 6, 1922; Birmingham, Alabama, U.S.
- Died: October 16, 2006 (aged 84); Alabama, U.S.
- Listed height: 6 ft 2 in (1.88 m)
- Listed weight: 195 lb (88 kg)

Career information
- High school: Woodlawn (AL); West End (AL)
- College: Alabama
- NFL draft: 1944: 22nd round, 221 (by the Brooklyn Tigers)th overall pick

Career history
- Detroit Lions (1947); Green Bay Packers (1948–1950)

Career NFL statistics
- Games played: 46
- Receptions: 61
- Receiving yards: 891
- Receiving TDs: 5
- Stats at Pro Football Reference

Theodore Walter Cook Sr. (February 6, 1922 – October 16, 2006) was a player in the National Football League (NFL). He played one season with the Detroit Lions and three with the Green Bay Packers.
