= 1946 All-SEC football team =

Group of top college football players from 1946

The 1946 All-SEC football team consists of American football players selected to the All-Southeastern Conference (SEC) chosen by various selectors for the 1946 college football season. Georgia and Tennessee shared the conference title.

== All-SEC selections ==
=== Ends ===
- Ray Poole, Ole Miss (AP-1, UP-1)
- Wallace Jones, Kentucky (AP-1, UP-3)
- Broughton Williams, Florida (AP-3, UP-1)
- Bill Hildebrand, Miss. St. (UP-2)
- John North, Vanderbilt (UP-2)
- Frank Hubbell, Tennessee (AP-2)
- Joe Tereshinski Sr., Georgia (AP-2)
- Jim Powell, Tennessee (UP-3)
- Ted Cook, Alabama (AP-3)

=== Tackles ===
- Dick Huffman, Tennessee (AP-1, UP-1)
- Bob Davis, Georgia Tech (AP-1, UP-2)
- Al Sidorik, Miss. St. (UP-1)
- Walt Barnes, LSU (UP-2)
- Dub Garrett, Miss. St. (AP-2)
- Ed Champagne, LSU (AP-2)
- Al Satterfield, Vanderbilt (AP-3, UP-3)
- Charley Compton, Alabama (UP-3)
- Jack Bush, Georgia (AP-3)

=== Guards ===
- Herbert St. John, Georgia (AP-1, UP-1)
- Wren Worley, LSU (AP-1, UP-2)
- Bill Healy, Georgia Tech (AP-2, UP-1)
- Gaston Bourgeois, Tulane (AP-3, UP-2)
- William Robertson, Vanderbilt (AP-2)
- Mike Mihalic, Miss. St. (UP-3)
- Ray Drost, Tennessee (UP-3)
- Amos Harris, Miss. St. (AP-3)

=== Centers ===
- Paul Duke, Georgia Tech (AP-1, UP-1)
- Vaughn Mancha, Alabama (College Football Hall of Fame) (AP-2, UP-2)
- Bert Corley, Miss. St. (UP-3)
- Jay Rhodemyre, Kentucky (AP-3)

=== Quarterbacks ===
- Frank Broyles, Georgia Tech (AP-1, UP-2)
- Y. A. Tittle, LSU (AP-2, UP-1)
- John Rauch, Georgia (College Football Hall of Fame) (AP-2, UP-3)

=== Halfbacks ===
- Harry Gilmer, Alabama (College Football Hall of Fame) (AP-1, UP-1)
- Charlie Conerly, Ole Miss (College Football Hall of Fame) (AP-2, UP-1)
- Shorty McWilliams, Miss. St. (AP-1, UP-3)
- Travis Tidwell, Auburn (AP-2, UP-2)
- Don Phelps, Kentucky (UP-2)
- Walt Slater, Tennessee (AP-3, UP-3)
- Dan Sandifer, LSU (AP-3)
- Pat McHugh, Georgia Tech (AP-3)
- Harper Davis, Miss. St. (AP-3)

=== Fullbacks ===
- Charley Trippi, Georgia (College Football Hall of Fame) (AP-1, UP-1)
- Gene Knight, LSU (UP-2)
- George Mathews, Georgia Tech (UP-3)

== Key ==
AP = Associated Press

UP = United Press.

Bold = Consensus first-team selection by both AP and UP

== See also ==
- 1946 College Football All-America Team
