= 1946 Pittsburgh Panthers football team =

American college football season

1946 Pittsburgh Panthers football
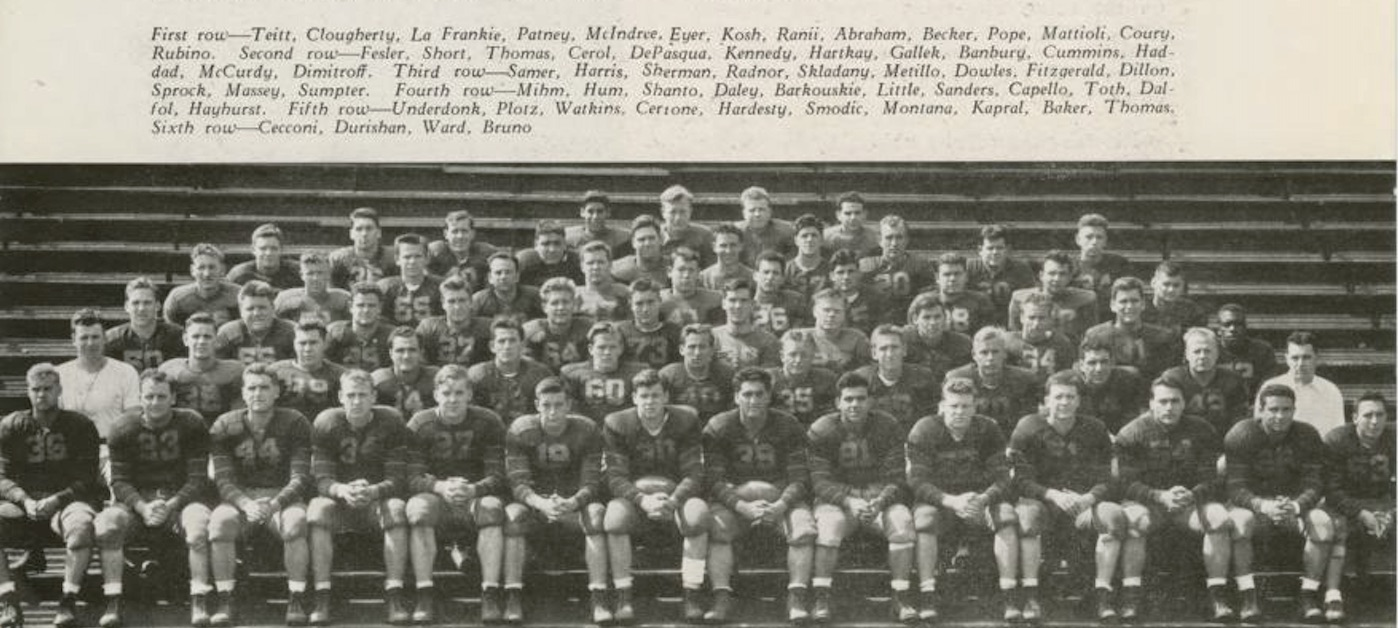
- Conference: Independent
- Record: 3–5–1
- Head coach: Wes Fesler (1st season)
- Home stadium: Pitt Stadium

1946 Eastern major college football independents records
	Conf.			Overall
Team	W	L	T	W		L		T
No. 2 Army		–		9	–	0	–	1
Rutgers		–		7	–	2	–	0
Penn State		–		6	–	2	–	0
Boston College		–		6	–	3	–	0
Holy Cross		–		5	–	4	–	0
NYU		–		5	–	3	–	0
Villanova		–		6	–	4	–	0
Colgate		–		4	–	4	–	0
Syracuse		–		4	–	5	–	0
Pittsburgh		–		3	–	5	–	1
Temple		–		2	–	4	–	2
Merchant Marine		–		4	–	7	–	0
Bucknell		–		3	–	6	–	0
Lafayette		–		2	–	7	–	0
Fordham		–		0	–	7	–	0
Rankings from AP Poll

The 1946 Pittsburgh Panthers football team was an American football team that represented the University of Pittsburgh as an independent during the 1946 college football season. In their first and only year under head coach Wes Fesler, the Panthers compiled a 3–5–1 record and were outscored by 136 to 88. Three of their losses were to teams ranked in the final AP Poll: No. 1 Notre Dame (0–33); No. 5 Illinois (7–33); and No. 20 Indiana (6–20).

Pitt was ranked at No. 43 in the final Litkenhous Difference by Score System rankings for 1946.

== Schedule ==
Date	Opponent	Site	Result	Attendance	Source
September 21	Illinois	Pitt Stadium; Pittsburgh, PA	L 7–33	35,000	
September 28	West Virginia	Pitt Stadium; Pittsburgh, PA (rivalry)	W 33–7	> 30,000	
October 5	at Notre Dame	Notre Dame Stadium; Notre Dame, IN (rivalry)	L 0–33	50,368	
October 12	Temple	Pitt Stadium; Pittsburgh, PA	T 0–0	3,000	
October 19	Marquette	Pitt Stadium; Pittsburgh, PA	W 7–6	18,000–20,000	
October 26	Purdue	Pitt Stadium; Pittsburgh, PA	L 8–10	38,000	
November 2	at No. 20 Indiana	Memorial Stadium; Bloomington, IN	L 6–20	17,000	
November 9	at No. 12 Ohio State	Ohio Stadium; Columbus, OH	L 13–20	74,743	
November 23	Penn State	Pitt Stadium; Pittsburgh, PA (rivalry)	W 14–7	50,000	
Rankings from AP Poll released prior to the game

== Preseason ==
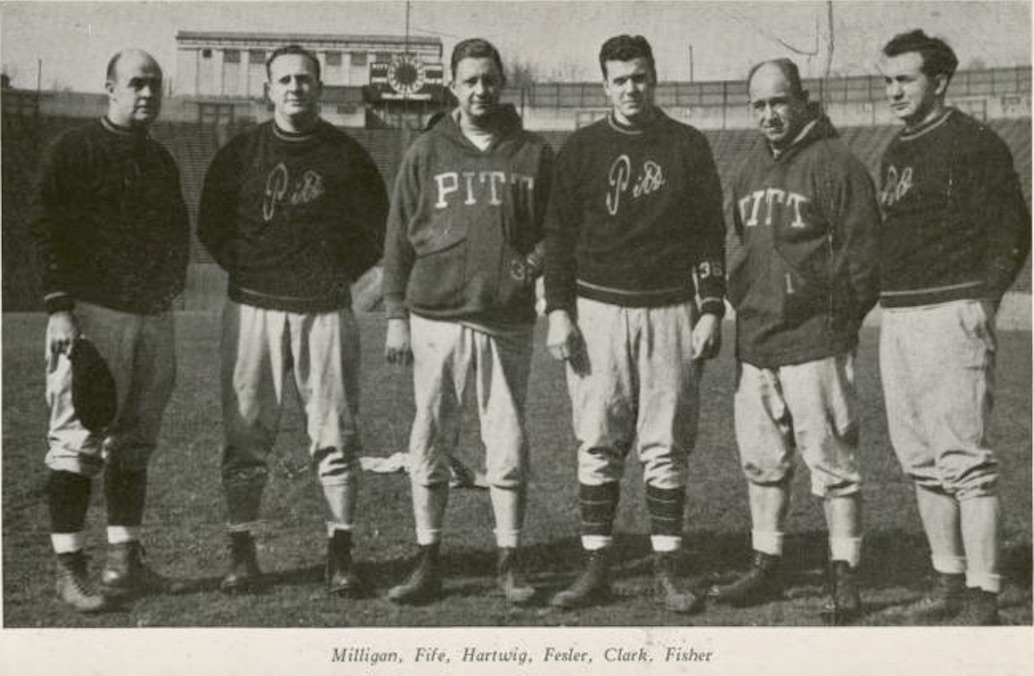
Coach Fesler and his staff

On January 31, with a three year record of 10–17, Coach Shaughnessy was requested by a faculty committee led by Professor R. A. Sherrill, faculty chairman of athletics, to sever his ties with professional football, and concentrate his efforts on improving the Pitt football program. Earlier, his three assistant coaches had threatened to leave if he was going to be retained. Shaughnessy answered the committee by pointing out the problems with the Pitt football program: inconsistencies in Pitt's football code; a schedule too hard for the material recruited; his staff of assistants were not good teachers and could not carry out assignments they were given. He told the Sun-Telegraph: "What I do with my Sundays off is my own business." On February 4, Clark Shaughnessy resigned as Pitt coach and accepted the coaching job at the University of Maryland (replacing Paul Bryant).

The Pittsburgh Panthers, had an 0–17 record against the nine-team Western Conference since they de-emphasized the program. However, they still held hope that they would be invited to be the tenth member. On March 12, Chancellor Rufus Fitzgerald announced the hiring of Ohio State grad Wesley E. Fesler as the 18th head football coach at the University of Pittsburgh. Fesler told The Press: "I knew I was being considered but I didn't think anything would be done so soon. Naturally, I'm happy and mighty pleased. I've already picked two of my assistants, Charles Hartwig and Mike Milligan." By April 3, Fesler's staff was complete with the addition of Dick Fisher, Lyal Clark and Ralph Fife.

On March 20, Coach Fesler welcomed over 100 candidates to his six-week spring practice session. Dr. Ralph Shanor returned from the Navy to his team physician position. Jimmy Dimitroff was appointed student manager and was assisted by Velt Castrodale. By April 10, only forty candidates remained on the squad. The coaches cut 15 deemed as unfit, and the Army drafted starting halfback James Robinson and center Jim Stopford. Starting tackle George Johnson played baseball, and one prospect did not make grades. The Sun-Telegraph reported that: "The abrupt letdown in interest has been caused partly by the dissatisfaction on the part of some players with their jobs at the school and partly by the fact that some candidates realized that they were not of varsity caliber..." "Some players holding janitorial jobs work a shift from 10 p. m. to 1 a. m. because classrooms are not vacant until then. The more disgruntled of this group have petitioned Chancellor Rufus Fitzgerald for relief." On May 2, the spring session ended with the Blues beating the Whites 36–0 in the final scrimmage game.

On August 18, the Panthers opened a three-week fall practice at The Kiski School in Saltsburg, PA. This was the first time they had practiced off-campus since their days at Camp Hamilton (1913–1936). Among the more than 100 prospects that made the trip were 56 discharged veterans, 65 freshmen, and 20 lettermen (9 of whom played the previous year). 15 more students were in summer school and would join the team upon its return to campus. The squad trained twice a day, were housed in tents and ate at a nearby boys' camp.

== Coaching staff ==
1946 Pittsburgh Panthers football staff
Coaching staff: Wes Fesler – head coach; Charles Hartwig – assistant coach; Dick Fisher – assistant backfield coach; Ralph Fife – assistant line coach; Walter Milligan – assistant coach; Lyal Clark – assistant defensive coach; Randy Gradisek - assistant coach; Ralph Mitterling - assistant coach	Support staff: James Hagan - director of athletics; Frank Carver – publicity director; Dr. Ralph Shanor – team physician; Howard Waite – trainer; Bill Haines – equipment manager; Jim Dimitroff – varsity student manager; Velt Castrodale – assistant manager

== Roster ==
1946 Pittsburgh Panthers football roster
Player	Position	Games	Weight	Height	Class	Prep School	Hometown
William Abraham (USN)*	halfback	9	185	5 ft 7 in	sophomore	Jeannette H. S.	Jeanette, PA
Jack Banbury (AC)	halfback	2	190	6 ft	senior	Schenley H. S.	Pittsburgh, PA
Bernard Barkouskie*	guard	9	200	5 ft 8 in	freshman	Wilkes-Barre H. S.	Wilkes-Barre, PA
William Bruno (USMC)*	fullback	9	180	6 ft	freshman	Penn H. S.	Verona, PA
Frank Capello (Army)	end	1	180	6 ft	freshman	Elwood City H. S.	Elwood City, PA
Louis Cecconi*	quarterback	9	155	5 ft 6 in	freshman	Donora H. S.	Donora, PA
Daniel Cerrone	tackle	2	245	6 ft 4 in	sophomore	Braddock H. S.	Braddock, PA
Henry Clougherty (USMC)*	center	9	185	5 ft 8 in	junior	Swissvale H. S.	Swissvale, PA
Ralph Coleman (USN)	guard	5	220	6 ft 1 in	sophomore	Ambridge H. S.	Ambridge, PA
William Coury (AC)*	guard	7	180	5 ft 9 in	freshman	Arnold H.S.	Arnold, PA
Walter Cummins (Army)*	end	9	200	6 ft 2 in	sophomore	Greensburg H. S.	Greensburg, PA
Peter Daley (USN)	halfback	2	170	5 ft 7 in	sophomore	Brownsville H. S.	Brownsville, PA
James DeLong (S)	tackle	0	210	6 ft 2 in	freshman	Reading H. S.	Reading, PA
Carl DePasqua*	quarterback	9	165	5 ft 6 in	freshman	Williamsport. H.S.	Williamsport, PA
William Dillon (AC)	guard	0	185	6 ft	freshman	Marianna H. S.	Marianna, PA
Charles Dowler	end	0	195	6 ft 3 in	freshman	Burgettstown H. S.	Burgettstown, PA
Jack Durishan (AC)*	tackle	9	220	6 ft 1 in	senior	Hazleton H. S.	Hazleton, PA
Wilbur Forsythe (S)*	tackle	6	210	6 ft 3 in	sophomore	East Huntingdon H. S.	East Huntingdon, PA
Peter Fuderich (USN)	halfback	3	180	5 ft 6 in	sophomore	Aliquippa H. S.	Aliquippa, PA
Romeo Gallifa (USMC)	center	1	190	6 ft	freshman	Donora H. S.	Donora, PA
James Gasper (S)	guard	0	195	5 ft 9 in	freshman	Peabody H. S.	Pittsburgh, PA
Gene Gaugler (USMC)	fullback	3	200	6 ft 2 in	sophomore	Beaver Falls H. S.	Beaver Falls, PA
Matt Gebel (Army)	fullback	3	190	6 ft	senior	East Pittsburgh H. S.	East Pittsburgh, PA
William Goelz (S)	end	2	175	5 ft 11 in	sophomore	Crafton H. S.	Crafton, PA
John Gregg (AC)	end	4	175	6 ft	junior	Mt. Lebanon H. S.	Mt. Lebanon, PA
Sam Haddad (USMC)*	center	8	210	6 ft 3 in	freshman	New Castle H. S.	New Castle, PA
William Hardesty (USN)	tackle	2	220	6 ft 1 in	freshman	Langley H. S.	Pittsburgh, PA
Morris Harris (USN)	tackle	4	260	6 ft	freshman	Glassport H. S.	Glassport, PA
James Hayhurst	guard	0	195	6 ft	junior	East Fairmont H. S.	Fairmont, WV
Robert Hum	halfback	1	180	5 ft 11 in	freshman	Columbiana H. S.	Columbiana, OH
George Johnson (Army)	guard	3	240	6 ft 4 in	junior	German Twp. H. S.	Edenborn, PA
John Kosh (Army)*	center	9	200	6 ft	junior	Donora H. S.	Donora, PA
John LaFrankie (USMC)*	halfback	6	195	5 ft 11 in	freshman	Elizabeth H. S.	Elizabeth, PA
Lindaro Lauro (AC)*	fullback	6	190	5 ft 9 in	sophomore	New Castle H. S.	New Castle, PA
Jack Lavia (S)	halfback	0	170	5 ft 11 in	freshman	Sharpsburg H. S.	Sharpsburg, PA
Robert Lee (USMC)*	halfback	6	175	5 ft 9 in	freshman	New Castle H. S.	New Castle, PA
George Matich (S)	halfback	1	190	5 ft 11 in	freshman	Clairton H. S.	Clairton, PA
Glenn McCurdy (USN)	guard	0	190	5 ft 8 in	sophomore	East McKeesport H. S.	East Mckeesport, PA
William McPeak (USN)*	end	9	185	6 ft	sophomore	New Castle H. S.	New Castle, PA
Joseph Massey (AC)	guard	2	200	6 ft	freshman	Beaver Falls H. S.	Beaver Falls, PA
William Mihm*	end	7	180	6 ft	sophomore	Westinghouse H. S.	Pittsburgh, PA
John Montana (Army)	fullback	0	185	5 ft 10 in	junior	Meadville H. S.	Meadville, PA
Jack Pepper (USN)	halfback	2	175	5 ft 10 in	freshman	Schenley H. S.	Pittsburgh, PA
Robert Plotz*	tackle	8	185	6 ft	freshman	Martins Ferry H. S.	Martins Ferry, OH
Chester Radnor (USN)	halfback	2	170	5 ft 8 in	freshman	Plymouth H. S.	Plymouth, PA
Leonard Radnor	center	4	185	5 ft 10 in	freshman	Plymouth H. S.	Plymouth, PA
George Ranii*	guard	7	210	5 ft 11 in	senior	Aspinwall H. S.	Blawnox, PA
Martin Rosepink (S)*	tackle	8	205	6 ft	senior	Verona H. S.	Verona, PA
Michael Roussos	tackle	6	240	6 ft 4 in	junior	New Castle H. S.	New Castle, PA
John Rozanski	tackle	0	195	5 ft 10 in	junior	Plymouth H. S.	Plymouth, PA
Joe Rubino	halfback	3	170	5 ft 6 in	freshman	Dormont H. S.	Dormont, PA
William Samer	end	0	190	6 ft 1 in	freshman	Donora H. S.	Donora, PA
Clair Saunders	halfback	0	175	5 ft 10in	freshman	New Brighton H. S.	New Brighton, PA
Clement Schneider (USMC)	end	1	195	6 ft 2 in	freshman	Central Catholic H. S.	Pittsburgh, PA
Ralph Short	quarterback	4	190	6 ft 1 in	freshman	Martins Ferry H. S.	Martins Ferry, OH
Leo Skladany*	end	8	200	6 ft	sophomore	Plymouth H. S.	Plymouth, PA
Jack Smodic	quarterback	3	165	5 ft 9 in	sophomore	German Twp. H. S.	Gates, PA
Michael Sprock (USN)	halfback	3	170	5 ft 8 in	sophomore	Ambridge H. S.	Ambridge, PA
Earl Sumpter	center	1	165	5 ft 10 in	freshman	Clairton H. S.	Clairton, PA
Robert Teitt*	fullback	4	190	5 ft 8 in	freshman	Trafford H. S.	Trafford, PA
Fred Thomas (USN)	center	0	185	6 ft	freshman	Tarentum H. S.	Tarentum, PA
Charles Underdonk	fullback	0	185	5 ft 8 in	freshman	Moundsville H. S.	Moundsville, WVA
Jack Ulam (AC)	halfback	0	170	5 ft 8 in	freshman	Mt. Lebanon H. S.	Mt. Lebanon, PA
Lee Ward (Army)*	center	4	175	6 ft	freshman	Mt. Lebanon H. S.	Mt. Lebanon, PA
Leo Watkins (AC)	guard	0	170	5 ft 9 in	freshman	Westinghouse H. S.	Pittsburgh, PA
* Letterman

== Game summaries ==
=== Illinois ===
Week 1: Illinois at Pitt

Team	1	2	3	4	Total
• Illinois	7	0	13	13	33
Pitt	7	0	0	0	7

- Date: September 21, 1946
- Location: Pitt Stadium
  Pittsburgh, PA
- Game start: 2:00 p.m.
- Game attendance: 35,000
- Game weather: sunny
- Referee: Russell Rupp (Lebanon Valley)

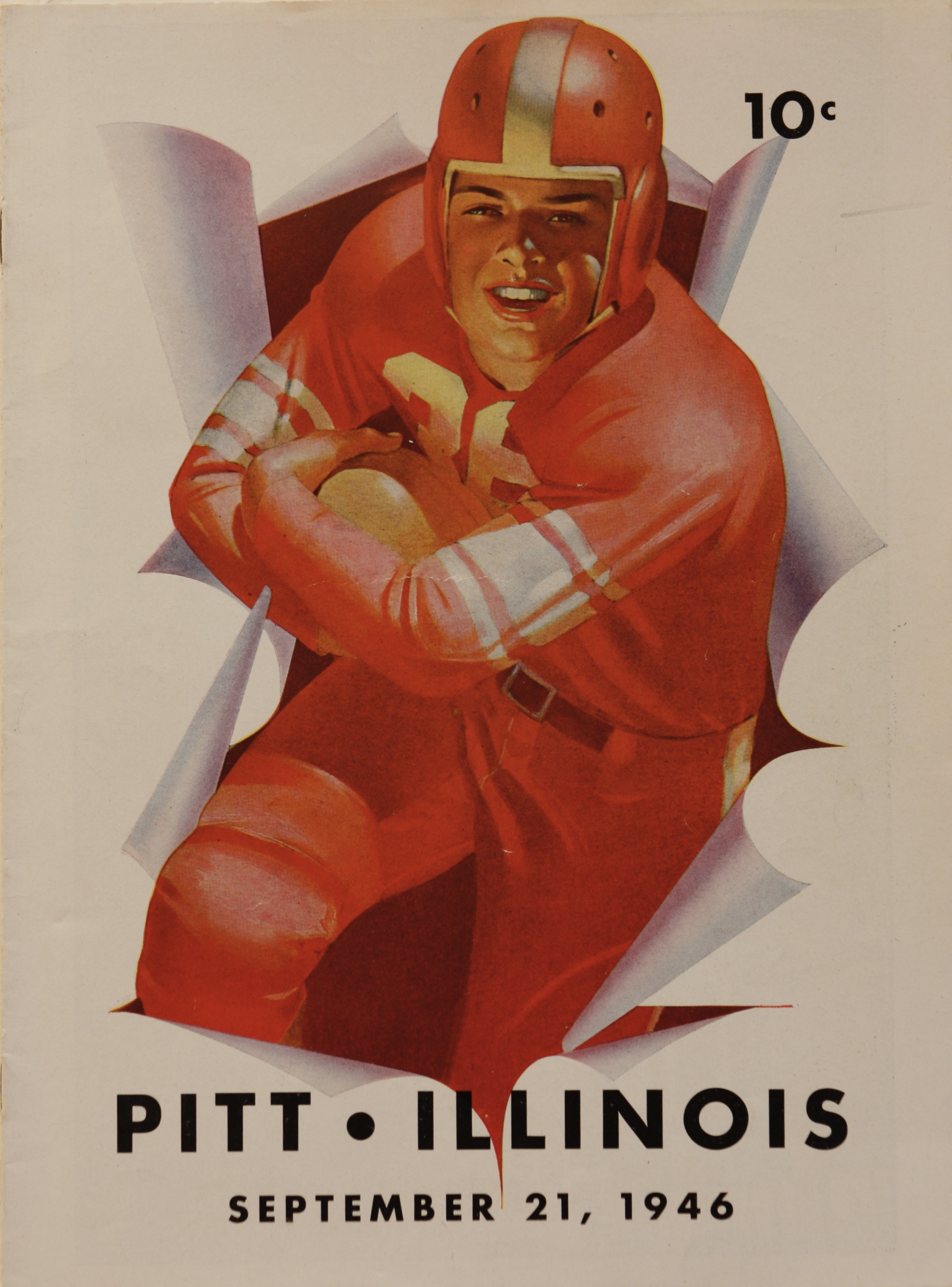
Program for September 21 game versus Illinois

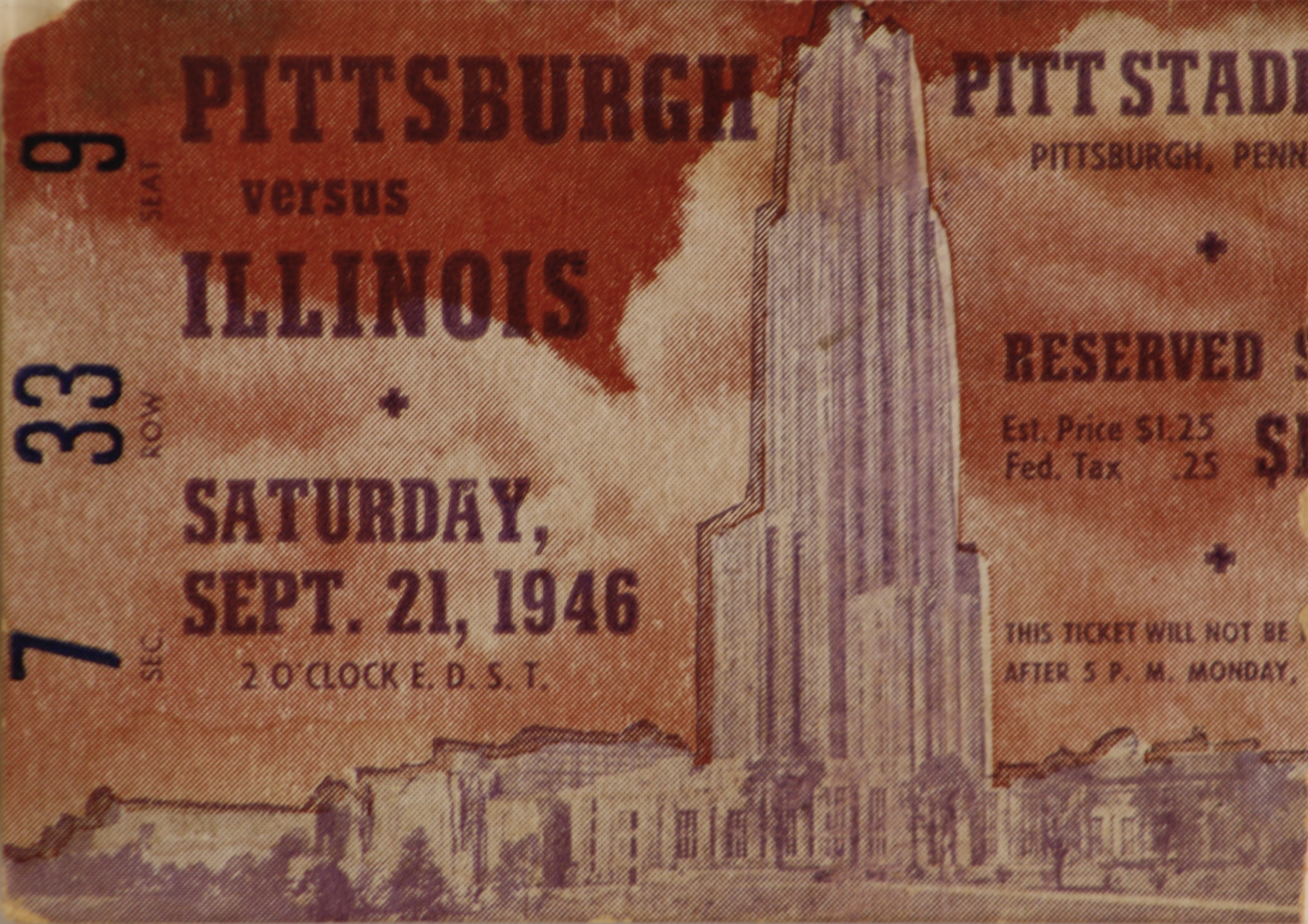
Ticket stub for September 21 game versus Illinois

On September 21, the Panthers, led by Wes Fesler, opened their season against the Fighting Illini for the second year in a row. The Illini led the series 3–0, and had out scored the Panthers 95–36. Illinois coach Ray Eliot had a veteran squad that was favored to win the Western Conference title. His analysis: "We are the most overrated team in the United States. There are 20 teams around who can knock us off." The Illini used both rail and air service to get to Pittsburgh. Seven members of the Illini squad arrived by train and the remaining twenty-nine members flew by chartered plane. Starting end Joe Buscemi and reserve halfback Jack Pierce did not make the trip. Guard Alex Agase was a consensus All-American.

Coach Fesler had only three lettermen in his starting lineup – Jack Durishan, Leo Skladany and William McPeak. McPeak and Durishan were named co-captains. The 120 member Pitt Band performed for the first time in three years.

The Panthers extended their winless streak against the Western Conference to eighteen games by losing to the Illini 33–7. Illinois star running back Buddy Young scored on a 46-yard dash around the left side of the Pitt defense on Illinois's second play from scrimmage. Pitt answered after Louis "Bimbo" Cecconi intercepted a Julius Rykovich pass on the Illini 37-yard line and returned it to the 22. Three plays later Cecconi scored from the 1-yard line, and then he booted the placement to tie the game. The Panthers played the second quarter in Illinois territory but were unable to score. Pitt end Walt Cummins dropped a pass on the 1-yard line; Illini quarterback Tommy Gallagher intercepted a Pete Fuderich pass on the goal line; and Mike Roussos missed a 23-yard field goal. After intermission, Buddy Young, Art Dufelmeier, Paul Patterson and Chick Maggioli each scored a touchdown, and Don Maechtle converted three of five extra points.

Illinois finished the season ranked #5 in the AP poll with an 8–2 record. They won the Western Conference Championship and beat UCLA in the 1947 Rose Bowl.

Even though the Panthers lost 2 starters early in the game to injuries (end Leo Skladany and running back Bobby Lee), Coach Fesler was pleased with the overall effort. He told the Sun-Telegraph that when the team came in the locker room: "They told me they were sorry they couldn't hold up the whole way and promised to win one for me next week. They have the right spirit."

The Pitt starting lineup for the game against Illinois was Leo Skladany (left end), Jack Durishan (left tackle), Bernard Barkouskie (left guard), Lee Ward (center), William Coury (right guard), Robert Plotz (right tackle), Bill McPeak (right end), Carl DePasqua (quarterback), Robert Lee (left halfback), William Abraham (right halfback) and Lindaro Lauro (fullback). Substitutes appearing in the game for Pitt were Walt Cummins, John Gregg, William Mihm, Frank Capello, Morris Harris, William Hardesty, Michael Roussos, Dan Cerrone, George Ranii, George Johnson, John Kosh, Earl Sumpter, Henry Clougherty, William Bruno, Louis Cecconi, Peter Fuderich, Michael Sprock, Jack Pepper, Ralph Short and Peter Daley.

Scoring summary

Quarter	Time	Drive			Team	Scoring information	Score	
Quarter	Time	Plays	Yards	TOP	Team	Scoring information	Illinois	Pittsburgh
1		2	54		Illinois	Buddy Young 46-yard touchdown run, Don Maechtle kick good	7	0
1		4	22		Pittsburgh	Louis Cecconi 1-yard touchdown run, Lou Cecconi kick good	7	7
3			73		Illinois	Art Dufelmeier 37-yard touchdown run, Don Maechtle kick no good (wide)	13	7
3		6	21		Illinois	Buddy Young 2-yard touchdown run, Don Maechtle kick good	20	7
4		3	37		Illinois	Paul Patterson 22-yard touchdown reception from Tom Stewart, Don Maechtle kick good	27	7
4		1	80		Illinois	Punt returned 90 yards for touchdown by Chick Maggioli, Tom Gallagher kick no good (Blocked by Ralph Coleman)	33	7
"TOP" = time of possession. For other American football terms, see Glossary of American football.							33	7

=== West Virginia ===
Week 2: West Virginia at Pitt

Team	1	2	3	4	Total
West Virginia	0	7	0	0	7
• Pitt	0	27	6	0	33

- Date: September 28, 1946
- Location: Pitt Stadium
  Pittsburgh, PA
- Game start: 2:00 p.m.
- Game attendance: 31,000
- Game weather: sunny
- Referee: W. T. Halloran (Providence)

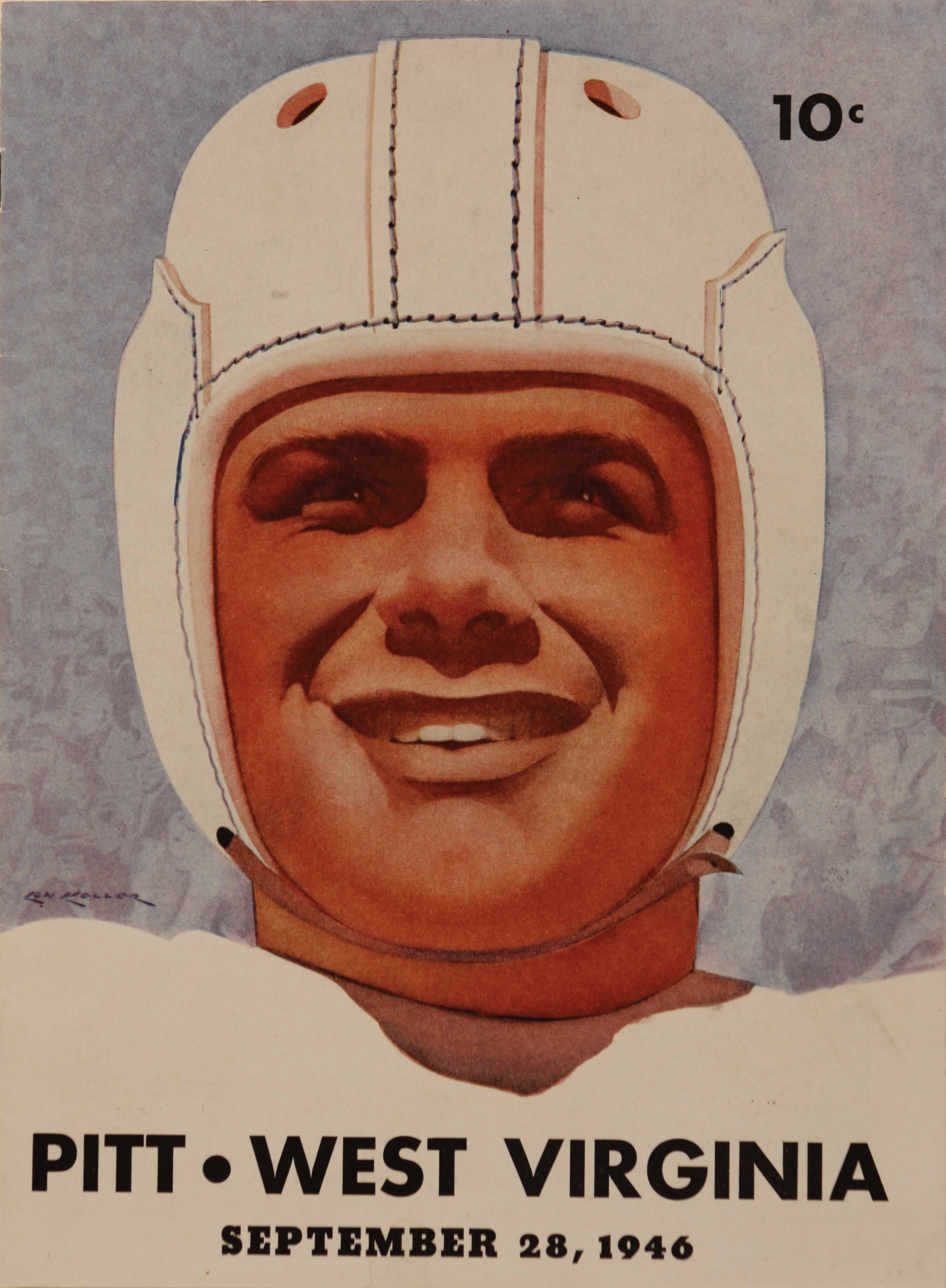
Program for September 28 game versus West Virginia

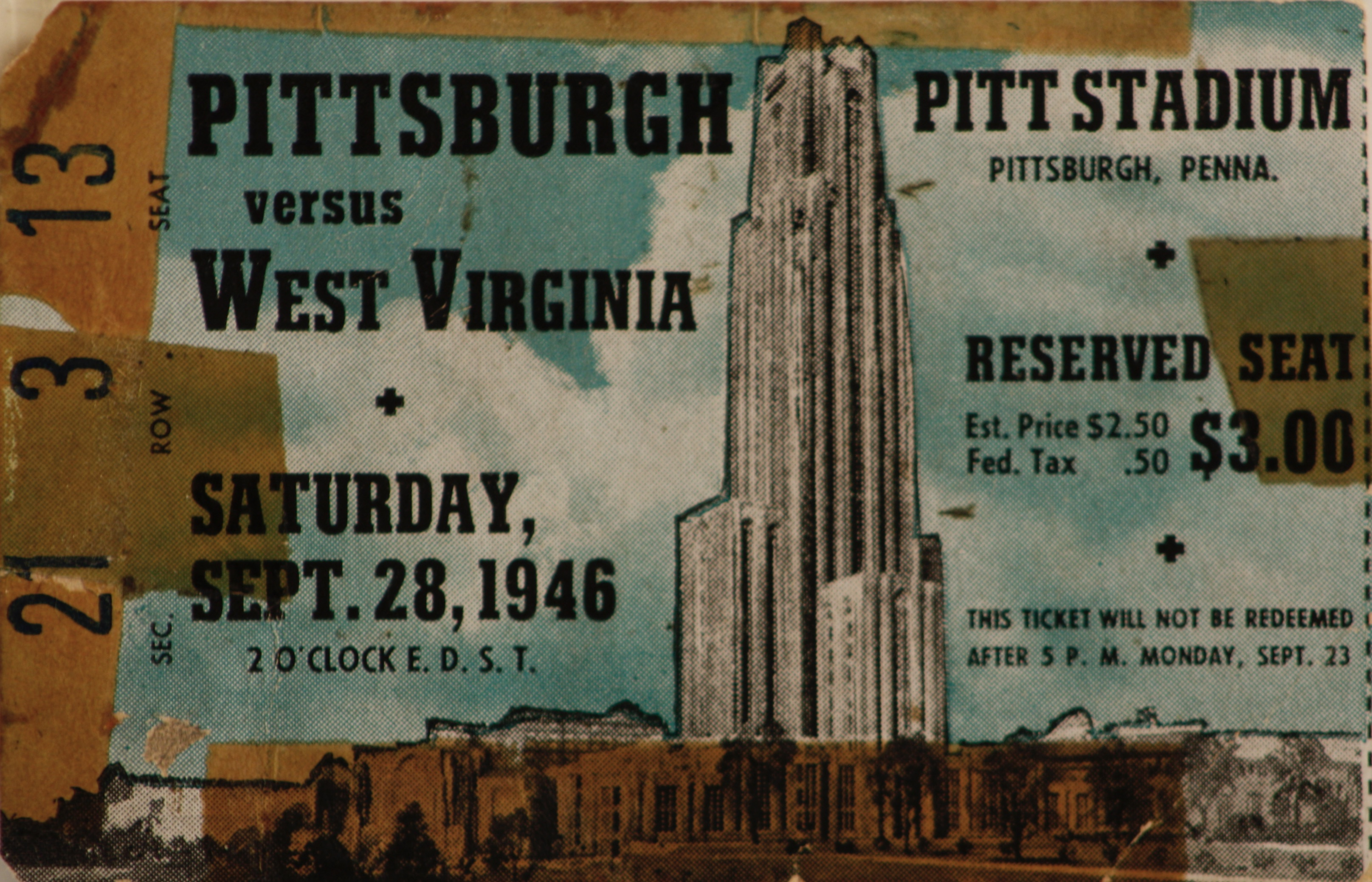
Ticket stub for September 28 game versus West Virginia

The Panthers and Mountaineers met for the 40th time on September 28. The Panthers held a 29–8–1 advantage in the series and had beaten West Virginia 14 straight times. Bill Kern, ex-Panther player and assistant coach, finished his naval tour of duty, and was back as head coach of the Mountaineers. West Virginia opened their season with a 13–7 victory over Otterbein. Prior to his entering the service, Mountaineer halfback Buddy Freeze, played his freshman year at Pitt.

Pitt was a heavy favorite (10–20 points) but two starters were injured. Coach Fesler replaced Leo Skladany with Walt Cummins at left end and Bobby Lee with Bill Bruno at left halfback.

The final score (33–7) was a repeat of the previous week, but this time Pitt was the victor. The opening quarter was scoreless. Five touchdowns were scored in the second period. West Virginia scored first on a 28-yard Russ Combs to Charley Helenski touchdown pass. Charley Becca added the extra point. The Mountaineers were offsides on the ensuing kick-off and had to rekick. Lou “Bimbo” Cecconi fielded the ball on his 3-yard line and raced 97 yards for the touchdown. Ralph Short's placement tied the game. Then the Panther defense forced a punt, and Pitt gained possession on the West Virginia 48-yard line. On first down Pitt quarterback, Carl DePasqua, threw a touchdown pass to Bill Abraham. Cecconi added the extra point and Pitt led 14–7. Next, Panther back, Bill Bruno, intercepted a pass that gave Pitt possession on the Panther 46-yard line. Three plays later Bruno ran 41 yards for the touchdown. Cecconi's placement was blocked, but Pitt led 20–7. An interception by Pitt center Henry Clougherty gave Pitt possession on the West Virginia 21-yard line. On the fifth play Cecconi scored on a 7-yard scamper and then added the extra point to finish the first half scoring at 27–7. Bill Abraham scored Pitt's final touchdown on a 6-yard scoring run in the third period. Cecconi's placement was blocked.

Coach Fesler was delighted but cautious with his praise: "We're still a long way away and our tackling wasn't as good as it should have been. But you have to hand it to the boys for how they refuse to fold up when the opposition jumps off to the lead."

The starting lineup for the game against West Virginia was Walt Cummins (left end), Jack Durishan (left tackle), Bernard Barkouskie (left guard), Lee Ward (center), William Coury (right guard), Robert Plotz (right tackle), Bill McPeak (right end), Louis Cecconi (quarterback), William Bruno (left halfback), William Abraham (right halfback)) and Lindaro Lauro (fullback). Substitutes appearing in the game for Pitt were John Gregg, William Mihm, Schneider, Morris Harris, Michael Roussos, William Hardesty, Martin Rosepink, Dan Cerrone, Joseph Massey, Henry Clougherty, George Ranii, George Johnson, John Kosh, Ralph Coleman, Sam Haddad, Romeo Gallifa, Carl DePasqua, Peter Fuderich, John LaFrankie, Jack Banbury, Ralph Short, Michael Sprock, Peter Daley, Robert Teitt, Joe Rubino, Eugene Gaugler and Leonard Radnor.

Scoring summary

Quarter	Time	Drive			Team	Scoring information	Score	
Quarter	Time	Plays	Yards	TOP	Team	Scoring information	West Virginia	Pittsburgh
2		8	50		West Virginia	Charley Helenski 28-yard touchdown reception from Russ Combs, Charley Becca kick good	7	0
2		1	97		Pittsburgh	Kickoff returned 97 yards for touchdown by Lou Cecconi, Ralph Short kick good	7	7
2		1	48		Pittsburgh	Bill Abraham 48-yard touchdown reception from Carl DePasqua, Lou Cecconi kick good	7	14
2		3	54		Pittsburgh	Bill Bruno 41-yard touchdown run, Lou Cecconi kick blocked	7	20
2		5	21		Pittsburgh	Lou Cecconi 7-yard touchdown run, Lou Cecconi kick good	7	27
3		1	6		Pittsburgh	Bill Abraham 6-yard touchdown run, Lou Cecconi kick blocked	7	33
"TOP" = time of possession. For other American football terms, see Glossary of American football.							7	33

=== at Notre Dame ===
Week 3: Pitt at Notre Dame

Team	1	2	3	4	Total
Pitt	0	0	0	0	0
• Notre Dame	0	12	14	7	33

- Date: October 5, 1946
- Location: Notre Dame Stadium
  Notre Dame, IN
- Game start: 2:00 p.m.
- Game attendance: 50,368
- Game weather: sunny
- Referee: William A. Blake (Loras)

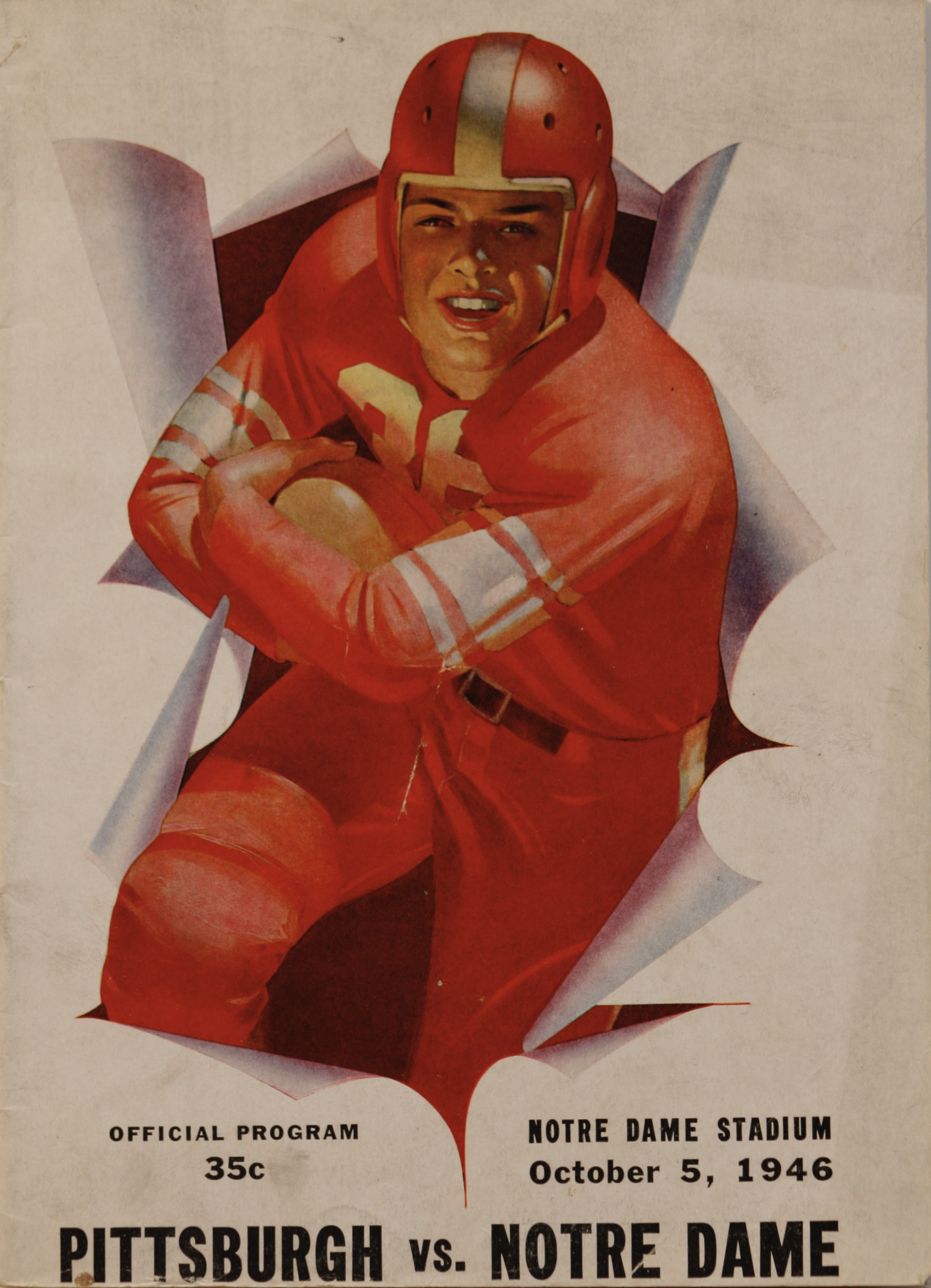
Program for October 5 game versus Notre Dame

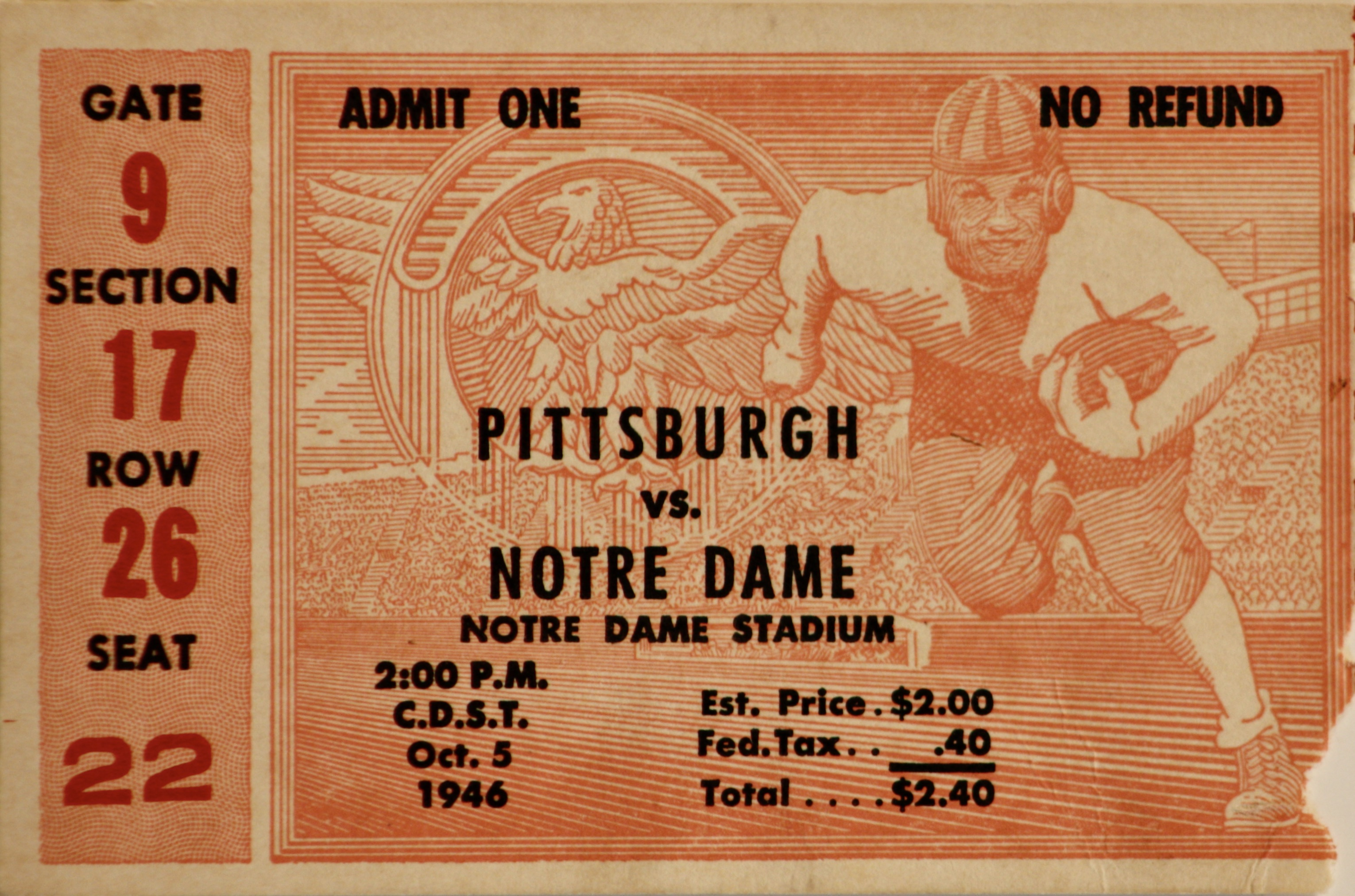
Ticket stub for October 5 game versus Notre Dame

On October 5, the Panthers traveled to South Bend to play the Fighting Irish of Notre Dame for the fifteenth time. Notre Dame led the series 8–5–1, and the Irish had outscored the Panthers 138–9 in the previous 3 games. Pitt and the Irish were 2–2 in the four games played at South Bend. Fourth-year coach Frank Leahy's squad was 1–0 on the season, having beaten Illinois 26–6 in their opener. The Irish lineup had 4 All-Americans – quarterback Johnny Lujack, tackle George Connor, guard John Mastrangelo and center George Strohmeyer.

Since the Panthers had 9 players on the injured list (Lindaro Lauro, Leo Skladany, Jack Smodic, Bob Lee, Mike Roussos, Bill Hardesty, Frank Capello, Romeo Galiffa and John Banbury), Notre Dame was heavily favored to win their home opener.

Notre Dame beat the Panthers 33–0. The Panther offense managed to gain only 42 total yards and 4 first downs. Their defense surrendered 257 yards rushing and 211 through the air. Johnny Lujack threw 2 touchdown passes (one each to Bob Livingstone and Jim Mello). Terry Brennan and Jim Mello each scored two touchdowns. Fred Earley converted three extra points. Notre Dame finished the season ranked number 1 in the AP poll with an 8–0–1 record.

The Pitt starting lineup for the game against Notre Dame was Walt Cummins (left end), Jack Durishan (left tackle), Bernard Barkouskie (left guard), Lee Ward (center), William Coury (right guard), Robert Plotz (right tackle), Bill McPeak (right end), Louis Cecconi (quarterback), William Bruno (left halfback), William Abraham (right halfback) and Eugene Gaugler (fullback). Substitutes appearing in the game for Pitt were Leo Skladany, William Mihm, John Gregg, Wilbur Forsythe, Morris Harris, Martin Rosepink, John Kosh, George Johnson, George Ranii, Ralph Coleman, Henry Clougherty, Sam Haddad, Leonard Radnor, Carl DePasqua, Ralph Short, Michael Sprock, Peter Fuderich, John LaFrankie, Victor Pepper, Joe Rubino, Chester Radnor, Matthew Gebel and Robert Teitt.

Scoring summary

Quarter	Time	Drive			Team	Scoring information	Score	
Quarter	Time	Plays	Yards	TOP	Team	Scoring information	Pittsburgh	Notre Dame
2		4	41		Notre Dame	Bob Livingstone 24-yard touchdown reception from Johnny Lujack, John Creevey kick no good	0	6
2		5	49		Notre Dame	Terry Brennan 6-yard touchdown run, John Creevey kick no good	0	12
3		5	30		Notre Dame	Jim Mello 16-yard touchdown reception from Johnny Lujack, Fred Earley kick good	0	19
3		5	99		Notre Dame	Jim Mello 29-yard touchdown run, Fred Earley kick good	0	26
4		6	47		Notre Dame	Terry Brennan 25-yard touchdown run, Fred Earley kick good	0	33
"TOP" = time of possession. For other American football terms, see Glossary of American football.							0	33

=== Temple ===
Week 4: Temple at Pitt

Team	1	2	3	4	Total
Temple	0	0	0	0	0
Pitt	0	0	0	0	0

- Date: October 12, 1946
- Location: Pitt Stadium
  Pittsburgh, PA
- Game start: 2:10 p.m.
- Game attendance: 2,500
- Game weather: rain
- Referee: Joseph H. Williams (Bucknell)

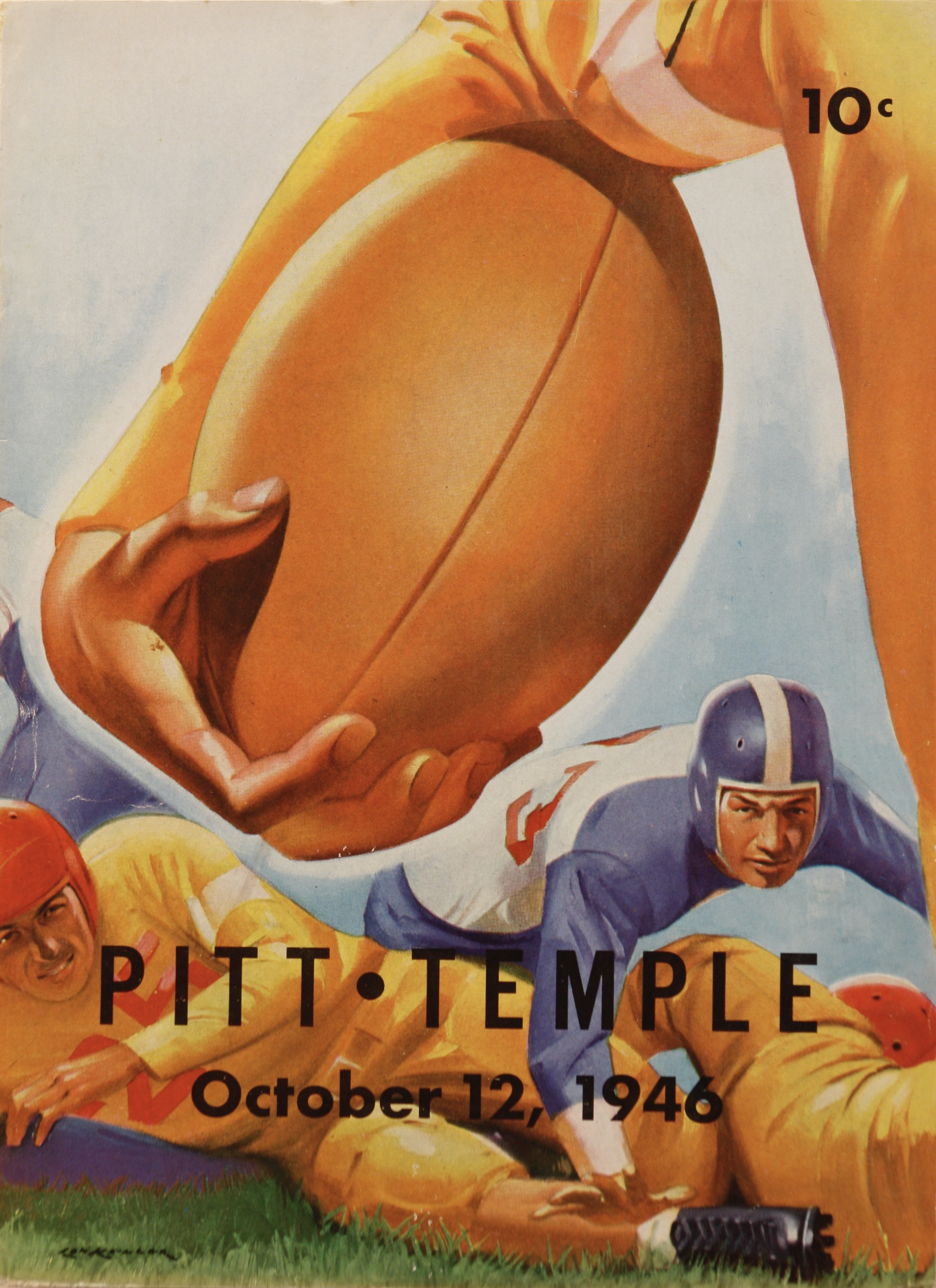
Program for October 12 game versus Temple

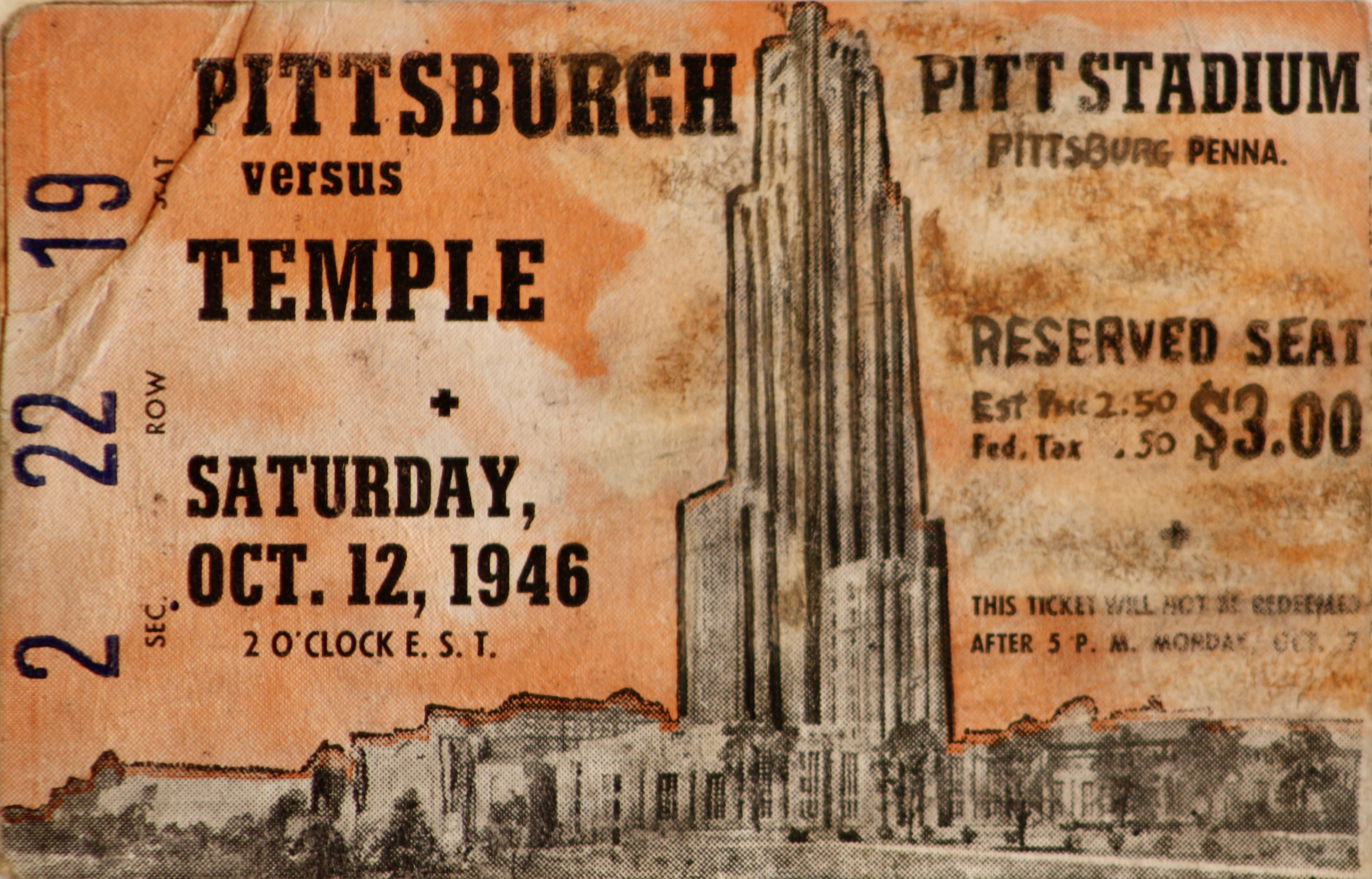
Ticket stub for October 12, 1946 game versus Temple

On October 12, in front of 2,500 rain-soaked fans, the Panthers and Temple Owls played for only the fourth time. Pitt led the series 2–1. The Owls had a 0–1–1 record, after tying SMU (7–7) and losing to Georgia (35–7). Since there was a hotel strike in Pittsburgh, second-year coach Ray Morrison brought his team to Pittsburgh in special B. & O. Pullman cars that served as their headquarters. Coach Morrison was cautiously optimistic: "We're in good shape physically and our mental attitude is right."

Coach Fesler made four changes to the Pitt starting lineup: Leo Skladany replaced Walt Cummins at left end; Henry Clougherty replaced Lee Ward at center; Carl DePasqua replaced Lou Cecconi at quarterback; and Matt Gebel replaced Gene Gaugler at fullback. Leo Skladany's brother Tommy played halfback for Temple.

An all day rain contributed to a sparse crowd and scoreless tie. Neither team came close to scoring. The Panthers offense drove to the Temple 34-yard line in both the second and third periods. The Owls offense drove to the Panthers 27-yard line in the first quarter and the 40-yard line in the final period. The remainder of the game was a field position battle as the teams combined for 29 punts.

The Pitt starting lineup for the game against Temple was Leo Skladany (left end), Jack Durishan (left tackle), Bernard Barkouskie (left guard), Henry Clougherty (center), William Coury (right guard), Robert Plotz (right tackle), Bill McPeak (right end), Carl DePasqua (quarterback), William Bruno (left halfback), William Abraham (right halfback) and Matt Gebel (fullback). Substitutes appearing in the game for Pitt were Walt Cummins, Martin Rosepink, Wilbur Forsythe, George Ranii, Frank Kosh, Sam Haddad, Lou Cecconi, Joe Rubino and Robert Teitt.

=== Marquette ===
Week 5: Marquette at Pitt

Team	1	2	3	4	Total
Marquette	0	6	0	0	6
• Pitt	0	0	7	0	7

- Date: October 19, 1946
- Location: Pitt Stadium
  Pittsburgh, PA
- Game start: 2:00 p.m.
- Game attendance: 20,000
- Game weather: fair and cool
- Referee: Lyle Clarno (Bradley)

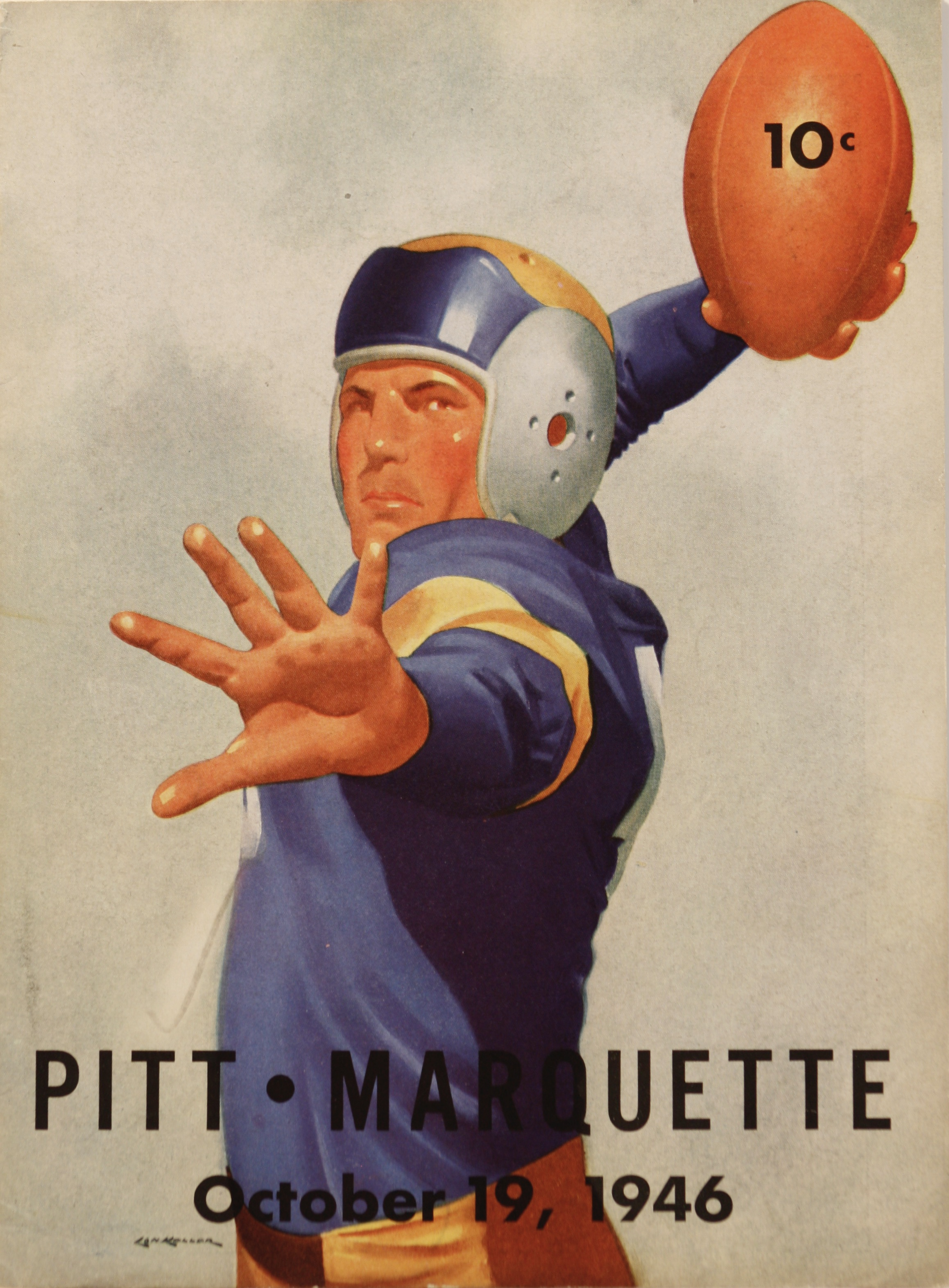
Program for October 19 game versus Marquette

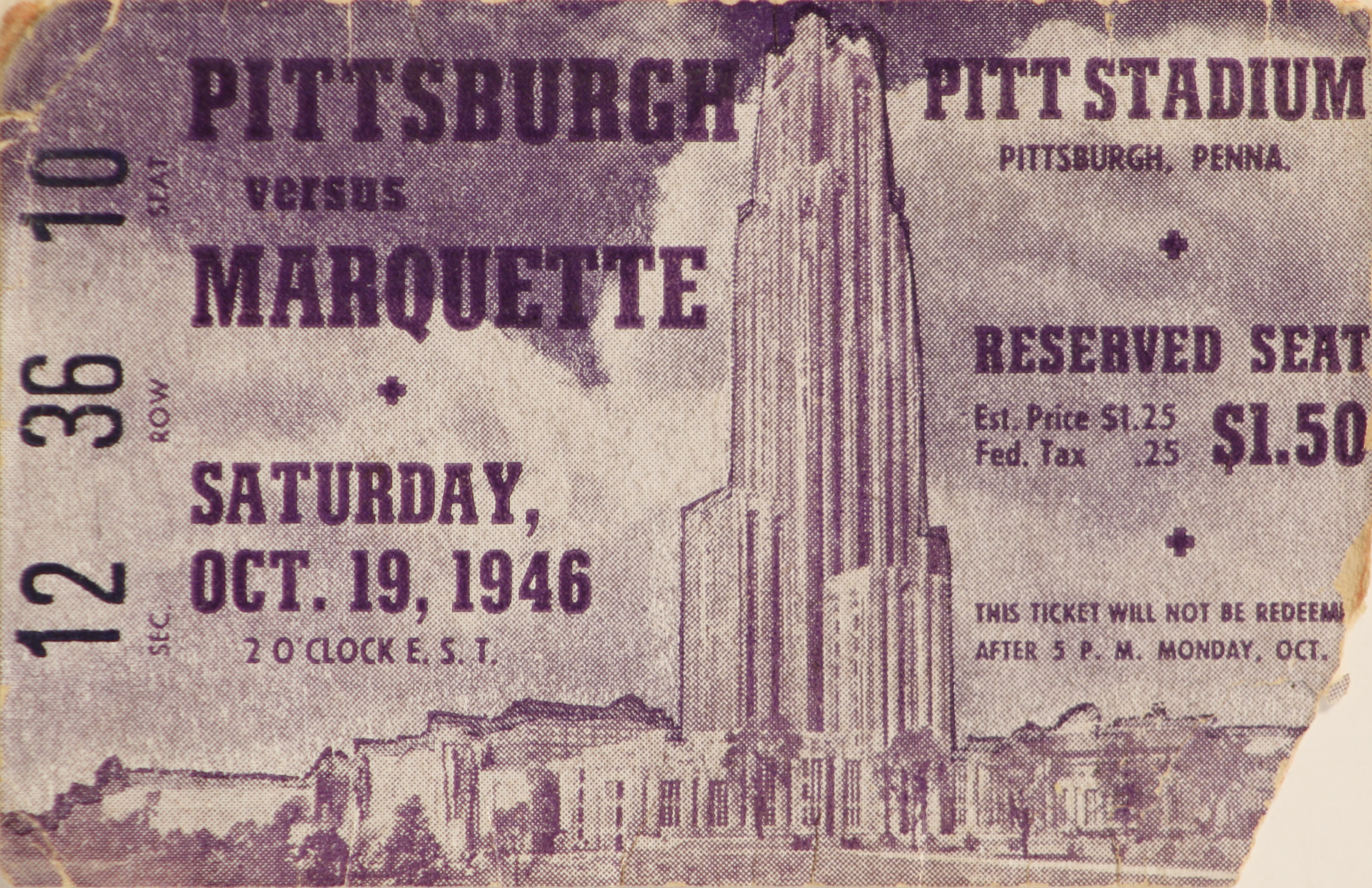
Ticket stub for October 19 game versus Marquette

On October 19, the Panthers played the Marquette Hilltoppers for the first time. Coach Frank Murray's Hilltoppers had a 2–2 record. Marquette was ranked the fifth most effective passing team in the country, having completed 57 of 108 tosses for 721 yards. Due to the continuing hotel strike, the 37 squad members (minus seven injured first stringers) were housed in their Pullman cars.

Injuries again played havoc with Coach Fesler's starting lineup. Linemen Bill Coury and Bob Plotz had sore shoulders and were replaced by Wilbur Forsythe and John Kosh. Fullback Matt Gebel, in the hospital with a head injury, was replaced by freshman Robert Teitt.

Thanks to Lou Cecconi's successful extra point, the Panthers eked out a 7–6 victory. The Hilltoppers completed 5 of 20 passes and had 5 intercepted. Pitt out-gained Marquette 263 to 169, but lost 5 fumbles. Marquette scored in the second period on a 46-yard pass play from Carl Schuette to Bob O'Hagan. George Gallo's placement went wide and Marquette led 6–0 at halftime. In the third period, the Panthers gained possession on the Hilltoppers 48-yard line. A pass play advanced the ball to the 35-yard line. Then, Carl DePasqua completed a pass to Leo Skladaney for the touchdown. Cecconi converted and Pitt led 7–6.

The Pitt starting lineup for the game against Marquette was Leo Skladany (left end), Jack Durishan (left tackle), Bernard Barkouskie (left guard), Henry Clougherty (center), John Kosh (right guard), Wilbur Forsythe (right tackle), Bill McPeak (right end), Carl DePasqua (quarterback), William Bruno (left halfback), William Abraham (right halfback) and Robert Teitt (fullback). Substitutes appearing in the game for Pitt were Walt Cummins, William Mihm, John Gregg, Mike Roussos, Martin Rosepink, George Ranii, Joseph Massey, Sam Haddad, Jack Smodic, Louis Cecconi, Jack Banbury, Robert Lee, Matt Gebel and Len Radnor.

Scoring summary

Quarter	Time	Drive			Team	Scoring information	Score	
Quarter	Time	Plays	Yards	TOP	Team	Scoring information	Marquette	Pittsburgh
2		4	69		Marquette	Bob O'Hagan 24-yard touchdown reception from Carl Schuette, George Gallo kick no good wide	6	0
3		2	48		Pittsburgh	Leo Skladany 35-yard touchdown reception from Carl DePasqua, Louis Cecconi kick good	6	7
"TOP" = time of possession. For other American football terms, see Glossary of American football.							6	7

=== Purdue ===
Week 6: Purdue at Pitt

Team	1	2	3	4	Total
• Purdue	0	7	0	3	10
Pitt	0	2	0	6	8

- Date: October 26, 1946
- Location: Pitt Stadium
  Pittsburgh, PA
- Game start: 2:00 p.m.
- Game attendance: 38,000
- Game weather: fair and warm
- Referee: Lloyd Larson (Wisconsin)

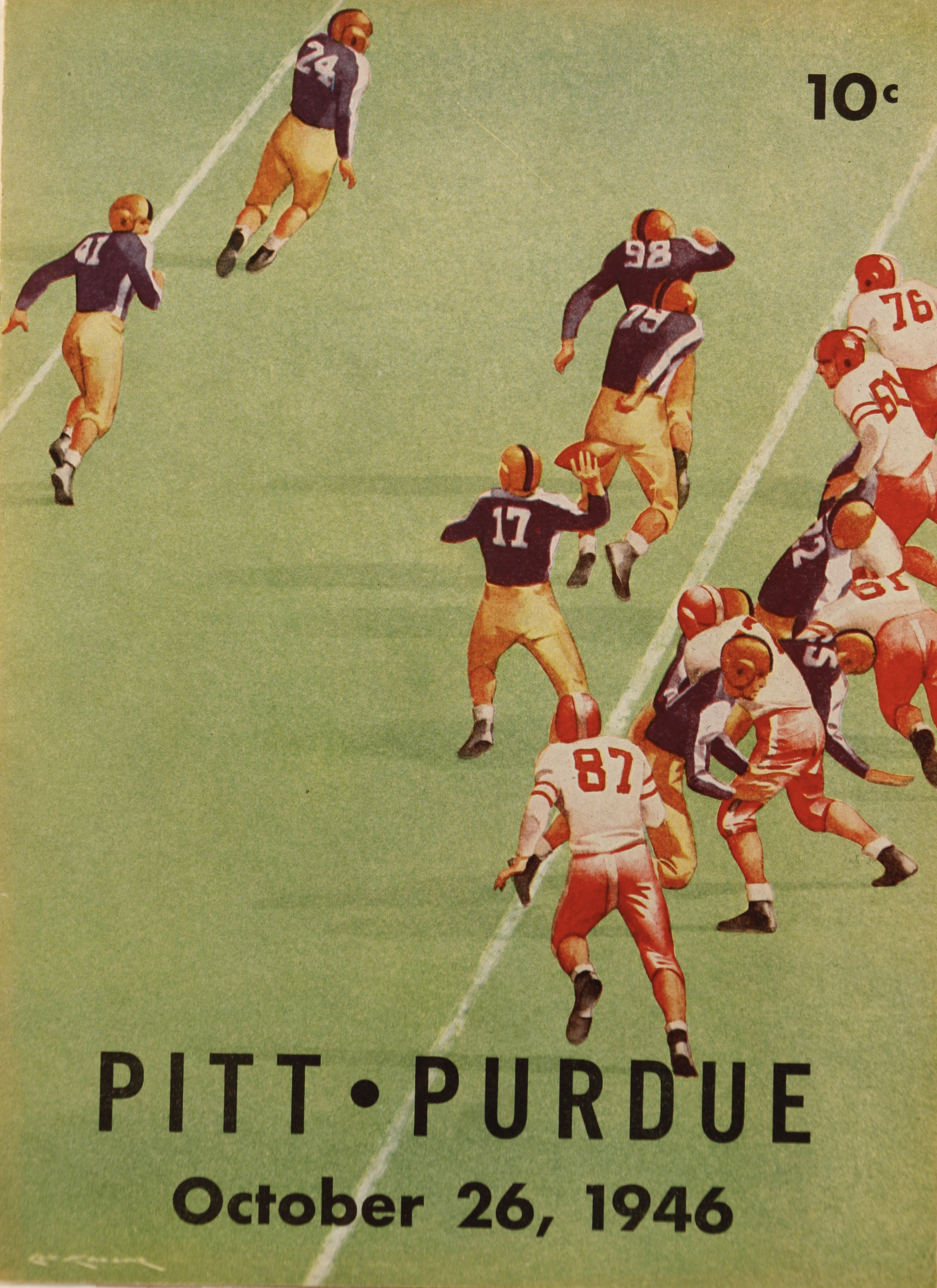
Program for October 26 game versus Purdue

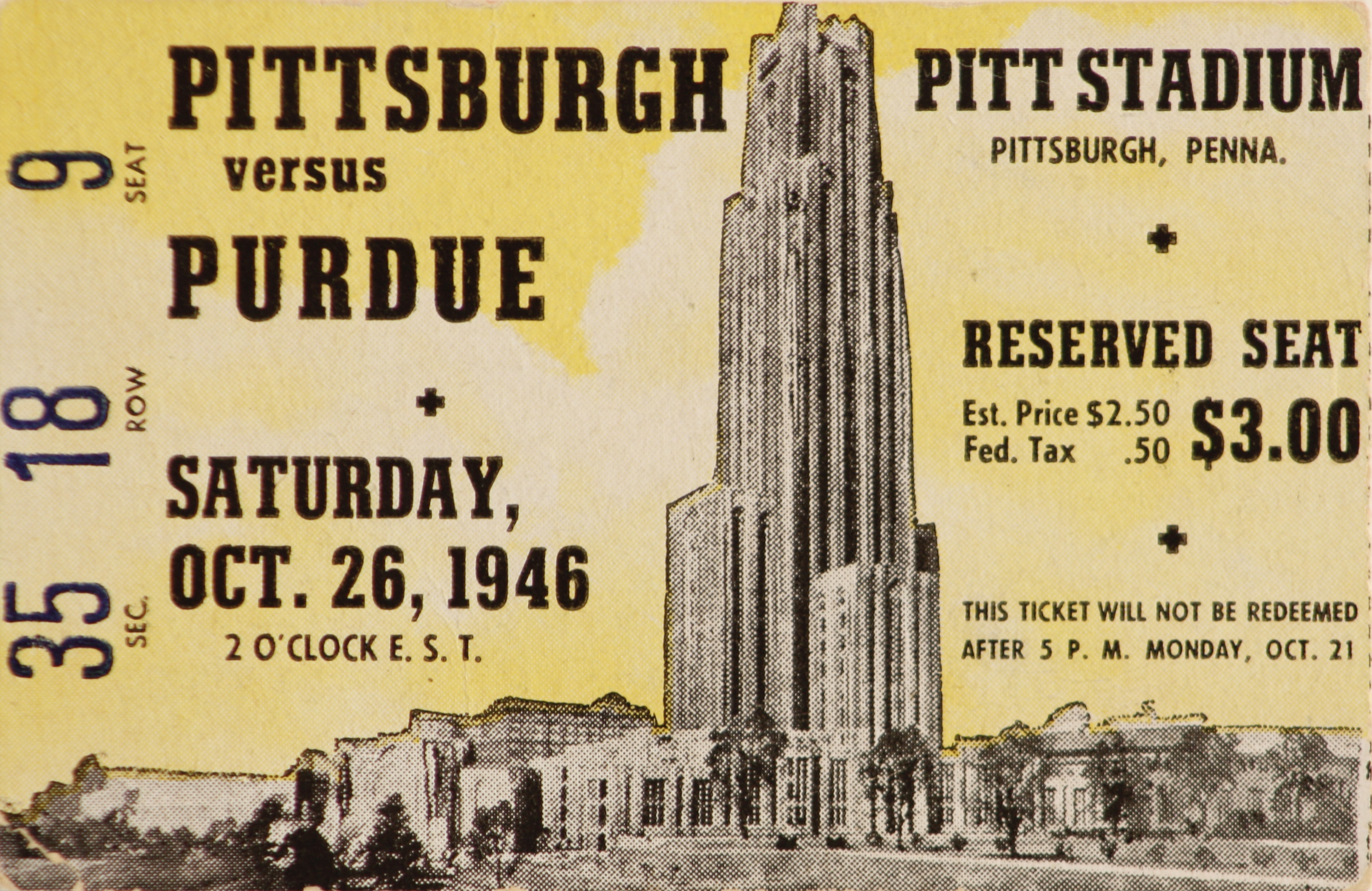
Ticket stub for October 26 game versus Purdue

On October 26, Coach Cecil Isbell and his Purdue Boilermakers, with a record of 1–3–1, were Pitt's opponent. Purdue led the series 2–0, and had held the Panthers scoreless in both contests. Purdue guard Dick Barwegan received All-America mention, but the two notable members of the squad were future coaching greats, Hank Stram and John McKay.

Coach Fesler lost three backfield members of his squad prior to the game, but overall, the Panthers were in their best condition of the season. Fullback Matt Gebel quit due to recurring headaches. Wingbacks Jack Banbury and Mike Sprock were not happy with their progress and turned in their uniforms.

Purdue extended the Western Conference win streak versus Pitt to 19 games. Hank Stram booted a last second field goal to win the game 10–8. At the end of the scoreless first quarter, the Boilermakers gained possession on downs at the Pitt 43-yard line. Purdue advanced the ball to the 6-yard line at the close of the quarter. On the third play of the second period, Purdue back Bob Pfohl scored on a 1-yard run. Hank Stram added the extra point and Purdue led 7–0. The Panther offense stalled and quarterback Carl DePasqua's punt rolled out of bounds on the Purdue 2-yard line. Pitt end Leo Skladany tackled Purdue quarterback Bob DeMoss in the end zone for a safety. Late in the fourth quarter, the Pitt offense drove 64-yards in 10 plays for the go-ahead touchdown. Bill Bruno went through right tackle from the 4-yard line for the score, but Lou Cecconi was wide on the point after. The Panther defense held and gained possession with little time left on the clock. Halfback Lindaro Lauro fumbled and Purdue recovered on the Pitt 43-yard line. A DeMoss pass to John McKay took the ball to the 10-yard line. Two plays gained 4 yards, then Stram booted a 19-yard field goal as time ran out. Purdue finished their season with a 2–6–1 record.

The Pitt starting lineup for the game against Purdue was Leo Skladany (left end), Jack Durishan (left tackle), Bernard Barkouskie (left guard), Henry Clougherty (center), John Kosh (right guard), Robert Plotz (right tackle), Bill McPeak (right end), Carl DePasqua (quarterback), Robert Lee (left halfback), William Abraham (right halfback) and William Bruno (fullback). Substitutes appearing in the game for Pitt were Walt Cummins, William Mihm, Wilbur Forsythe, Martin Rosepink, George Ranii, Sam Haddad, Gene Gaugler, Jack Smodic, Louis Cecconi, Bob Hum, John LaFrankie, Len Radnor and Lindara Lauro.

Scoring summary

Quarter	Time	Drive			Team	Scoring information	Score	
Quarter	Time	Plays	Yards	TOP	Team	Scoring information	Purdue	Pittsburgh
2		9	43		Purdue	Bob Pfohl 1-yard touchdown run, Hank Stram kick good	7	0
2		1			Pittsburgh	Bob DeMoss tackled in end zone for a safety by Leo Skladany	7	2
4		10	64		Pittsburgh	Bill Bruno 4-yard touchdown run, Lou Cecconi kick no good (wide)	7	8
4		5	37		Purdue	19-yard field goal by Hank Stram	10	8
"TOP" = time of possession. For other American football terms, see Glossary of American football.							10	8

=== at Indiana ===
Week 7: Pitt at Indiana

Team	1	2	3	4	Total
Pitt	6	0	0	0	6
• Indiana	7	7	6	0	20

- Date: November 2, 1946
- Location: Memorial Stadium
  Bloomington, IN
- Game start: 2:00 p.m.
- Game attendance: 17,000
- Game weather: partly cloudy
- Referee: Jay Berwanger (Chicago)

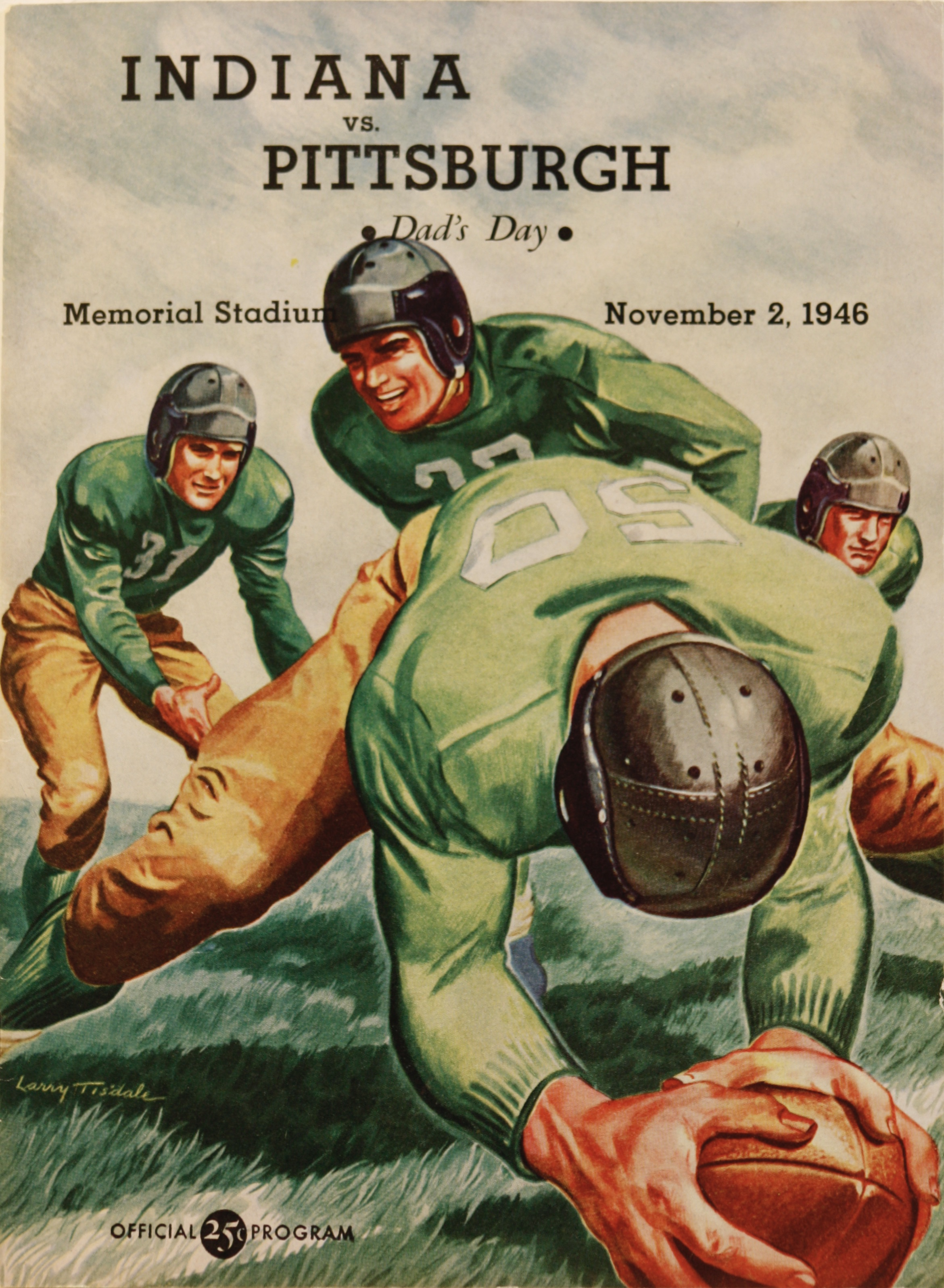
Program for November 2 game versus Indiana

On November 2, the defending Western Conference Indiana Hoosiers hosted the Panthers. The Hoosiers led the series 3–0, and had outscored the Panthers 85–7. Coach Bo McMillin's, Hoosiers were ranked #20 in AP poll with a 3–3 record. Fullback Pete Pihos, quarterback Ben Raimondi and center John Cannady received All-American mention. McMillin told his squad: "the Panthers are 'corn-cob rough' and predicted the Hoosiers 'will be ripe for a pickin' unless we're ready to play our best football."

The Panther traveling squad rode the train to Indianapolis; ate breakfast at the Claypool Hotel; chartered a bus for the final 55 miles to Bloomington; and headquartered at the Graham Hotel. Coach Fesler used the same lineup that started against Purdue to play the favored Hoosiers.

The Panthers scored first, but the Hoosiers came from behind and kept the Western Conference win streak over Pitt alive with a 20 to 6 victory. In the opening period, Carl DePasqua threw a 24-yard touchdown pass to Bill McPeak to cap a 7-play, 69-yard drive. Lou Cecconi's placement sailed wide. The Hoosiers answered with a 5-play, 56-yard drive of their own. Hoosier fullback Pete Pihos ran in from the two-yard line, and Charley Armstrong added the point after to give Indiana the lead. Indiana added another touchdown before halftime on a Mel Groomes 2-yard run inside tackle. Armstrong added the point after and Indiana led 14–6. The final score came in the third quarter on a 68-yard punt return by Bob Cowan. The Panthers managed to play the final period in Indiana territory, but were unable to capitalize due to fumbles and penalties.

The Pitt starting lineup for the game against Indiana was Leo Skladany (left end), Jack Durishan (left tackle), Bernard Barkouskie (left guard), Henry Clougherty (center), William Coury (right guard), Robert Plotz (right tackle), Bill McPeak (right end), Carl DePasqua (quarterback), Robert Lee (left halfback), William Abraham (right halfback) and William Bruno (fullback). Substitutes appearing in the game for Pitt were Walt Cummins, William Mihm, William Goelz, Martin Rosepink, Mike Roussos, Morris Harris, John Kosh, Ralph Coleman, Sam Haddad, Jack Smodic, Louis Cecconi, John LaFrankie, Lindara Lauro and Ralph Short.

Scoring summary

Quarter	Time	Drive			Team	Scoring information	Score	
Quarter	Time	Plays	Yards	TOP	Team	Scoring information	Pittsburgh	Indiana
1		7	69		Pittsburgh	William McPeak 24-yard touchdown reception from Carl DePasqua, Lou Cecconi kick no good (wide)	6	0
1		5	56		Indiana	Pete Pihos 2-yard touchdown run, Charley Armstrong kick good	6	7
2		5	40		Indiana	Mel Groomes 2-yard touchdown run, Charley Armstrong kick good	6	14
3		1	68		Indiana	Punt returned 68 yards for touchdown by Bob Cowan, kick no good	6	20
"TOP" = time of possession. For other American football terms, see Glossary of American football.							6	20

=== at Ohio State ===
Week 8: Pitt at Ohio State

Team	1	2	3	4	Total
Pitt	0	7	0	6	13
• Ohio State	0	7	7	6	20

- Date: November 9, 1946
- Location: Ohio Stadium
  Columbus, OH
- Game start: 2:00 p.m.
- Game attendance: 74,743
- Game weather: fair and cool
- Referee: David Noble (Nebraska)

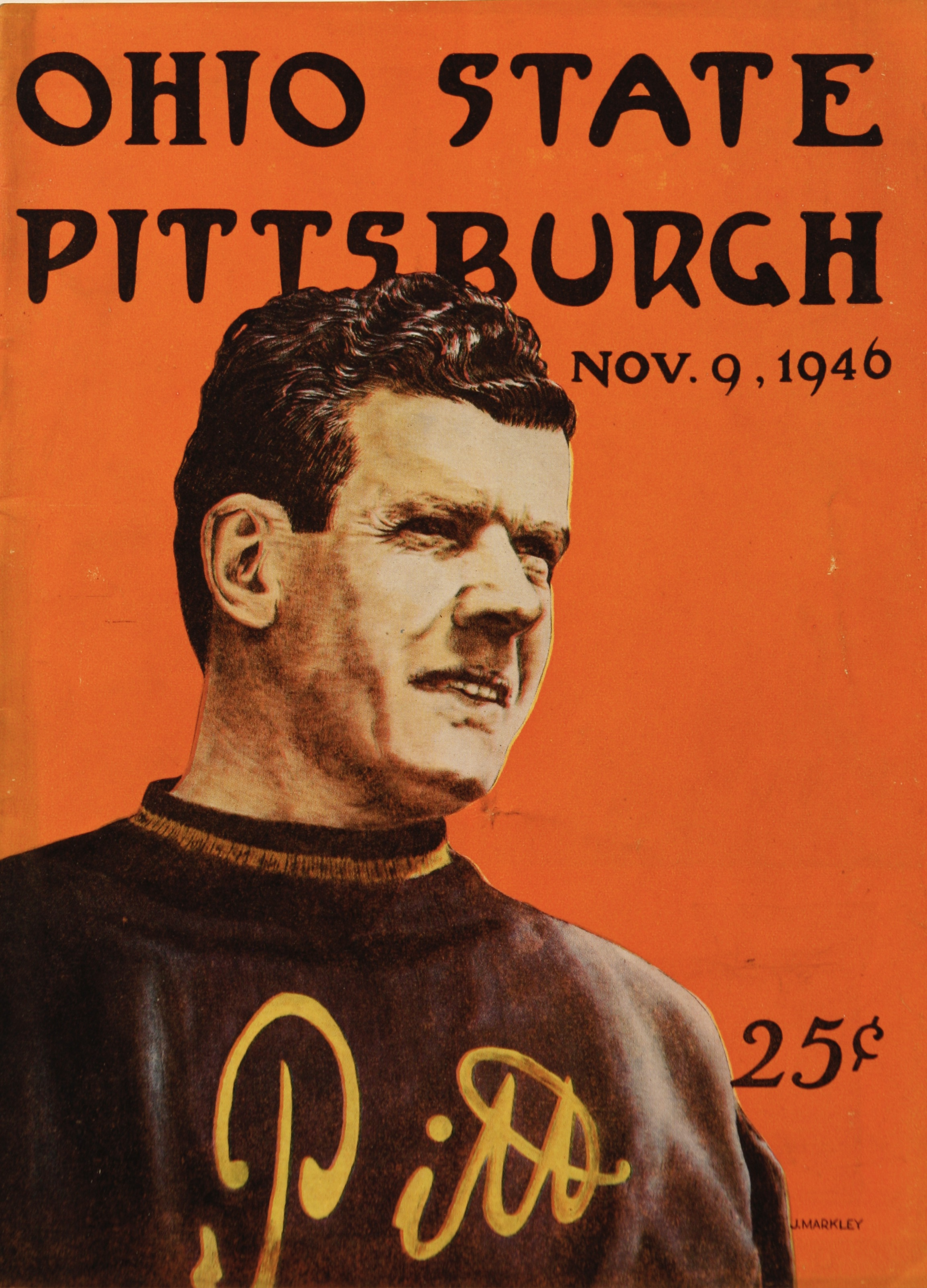
Program for November 9 game versus Ohio State

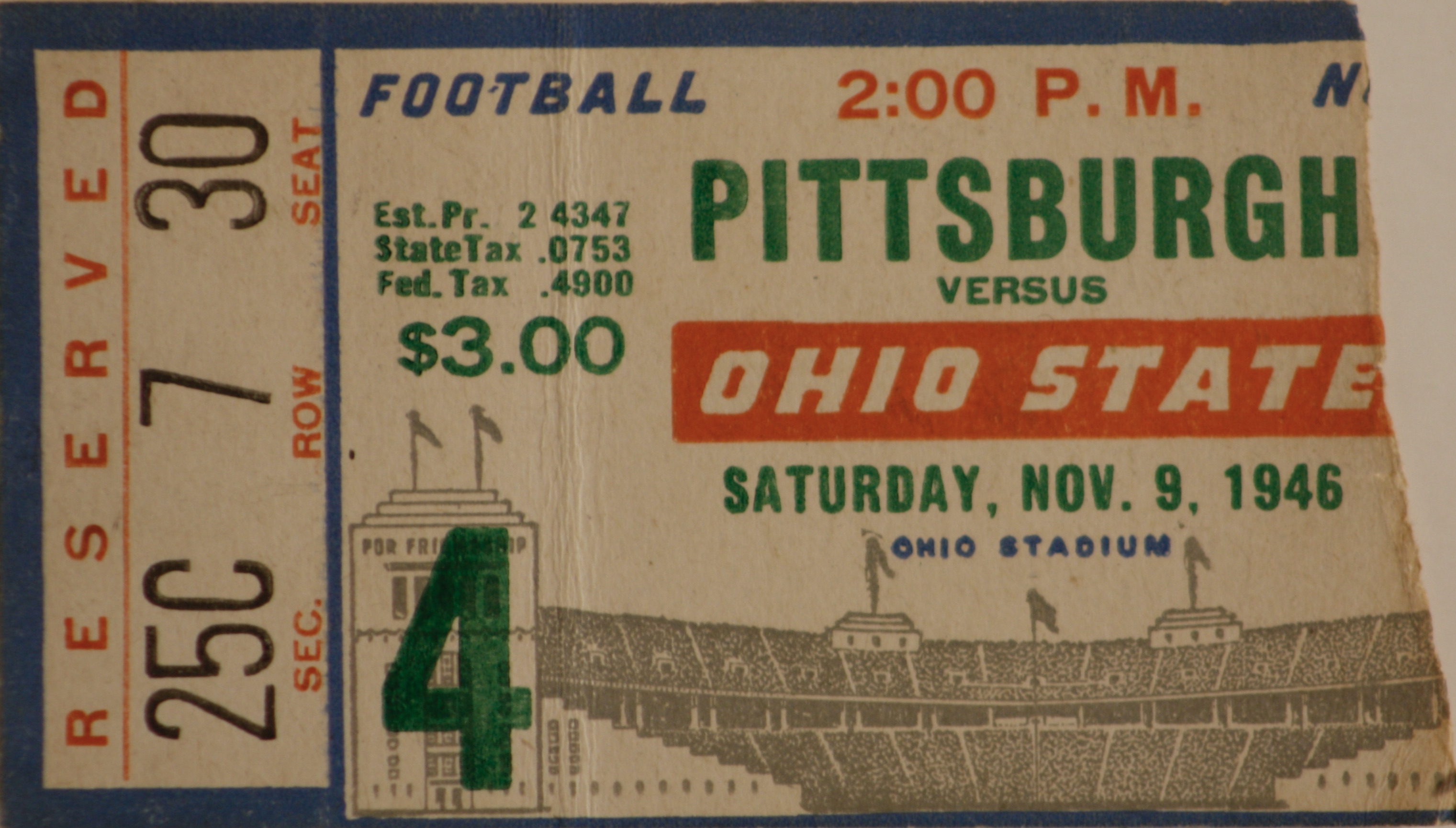
Ticket stub for November 9 game versus Ohio State

On November 9, the Panthers played Ohio State. Coach Wes Fesler's alma mater was their last Western Conference opponent for the season. The Buckeyes led the series 7–2–1, and had won the past 6 in a row. First-year Coach Paul Bixler's Buckeyes were ranked #12 with a 3–1–2 record. The Buckeye line was anchored by Warren Amling, consensus All-American tackle. Coach Paul Bixler was concerned with Pitt's 5–4–2 defensive alignment: "That unorthodox defense 'Fes' has been throwing at his opponents is bound to cause us plenty of trouble."

Harry Keck of the Sun-Telegraph reported that Pitt Coach Fesler would be next in line for the Ohio State head coaching position if anything happened to Bixler. Fesler was a 3-time All-American football star, and also played baseball and basketball for the Buckeyes. Coach Fesler used the same starting lineup as the previous week for his homecoming game.

For the second straight game the Panthers scored first but could not hold on, and were defeated 20–13 by the Buckeyes. After a scoreless first quarter, Ohio State back Alex Verdova fumbled a Carl DePasqua punt and Pitt guard Bernie Barkouskie recovered on the Buckeye 19-yard line. On first down, Lou Cecconi threw a touchdown pass to Bill McPeak and Bill Coury added the extra point for a 7–0 lead. Ohio State answered with a 6-play, 60-yard drive, capped by a 4-yard touchdown pass from George Spencer to Cecil Souders. Max Schnittker's extra point tied the score. In the third period, Spencer threw a 54-yard touchdown pass to Robert Brugge and Schnittker's placement was good to give the Buckeyes the lead. In the final quarter, the Panthers offense went on an 11-play, 68-yard drive. Lou Cecconi scored on a quarterback sneak from the 2-yard line. The center snap on the extra point was fumbled and Pitt trailed by 1. The Panthers defense then gave up another touchdown pass from Spencer to Brugge, which iced the game for the Buckeyes. The Panthers were now 0–21 against the Western Conference since Sutherland was forced to resign.

The starting lineup for Pitt against Ohio State was Leo Skladany (left end), Jack Durishan (left tackle), Bernard Barkouskie (left guard), Henry Clougherty (center), John Kosh (right guard), Robert Plotz (right tackle), Bill McPeak (right end), Carl DePasqua (quarterback), Robert Lee (left halfback), William Abraham (right halfback) and William Bruno (fullback). Substitutes appearing in the game for Pitt were Walt Cummins, William Mihm, Martin Rosepink, Wilbur Forsythe, William Coury, Ralph Coleman, Sam Haddad, Lee Ward, Louis Cecconi, John LaFrankie, Lindara Lauro and George Matich.

Scoring summary

Quarter	Time	Drive			Team	Scoring information	Score	
Quarter	Time	Plays	Yards	TOP	Team	Scoring information	Pittsburgh	Ohio State
2		1	19		Pittsburgh	William McPeak 19-yard touchdown reception from Lou Cecconi, Bill Coury kick good	7	0
2		6	60		Ohio State	Cecil Souders 4-yard touchdown reception from George Spencer, Max Schnittker kick good	7	7
3		3	68		Ohio State	Robert Brugge 54-yard touchdown reception from George Spencer, Max Schnittker kick good	7	14
4		11	68		Pittsburgh	Lou Cecconi 2-yard touchdown run, Bill Coury kick no good (fumbled center snap)	13	14
4		4	58		Ohio State	Robert Brugge 8-yard touchdown reception from George Spencer, Max Schnittker kick no good	13	20
"TOP" = time of possession. For other American football terms, see Glossary of American football.							13	20

=== Penn State ===
Week 9: Penn State at Pitt

Team	1	2	3	4	Total
Purdue	0	0	0	7	7
• Pitt	0	7	0	7	14

- Date: November 23, 1946
- Location: Pitt Stadium
  Pittsburgh, PA
- Game start: 2:00 p.m.
- Game attendance: 50,000
- Game weather: cloudy and cold
- Referee: Harry Dayhoff (Bucknell)

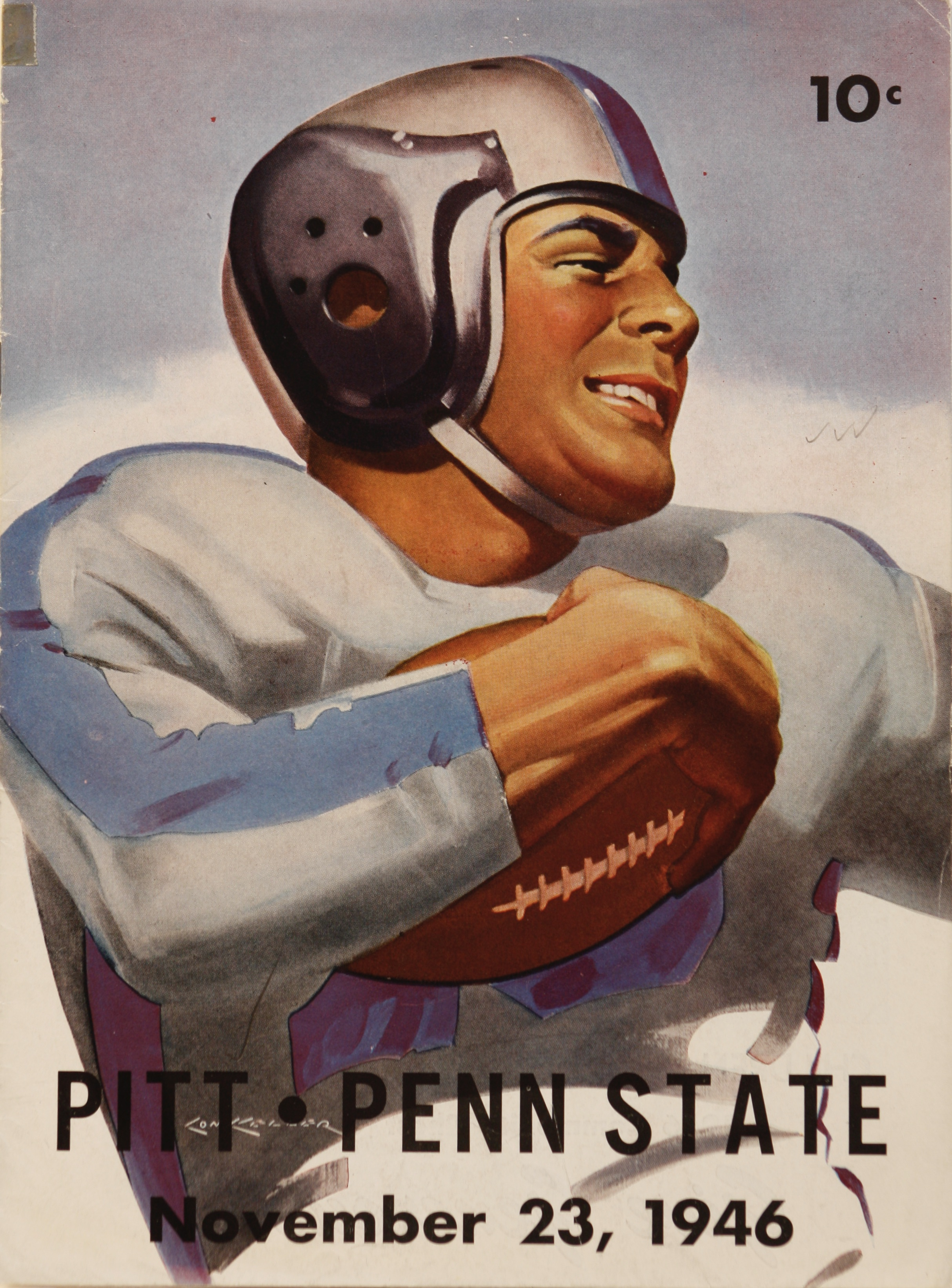
Program for November 23 game versus Penn State

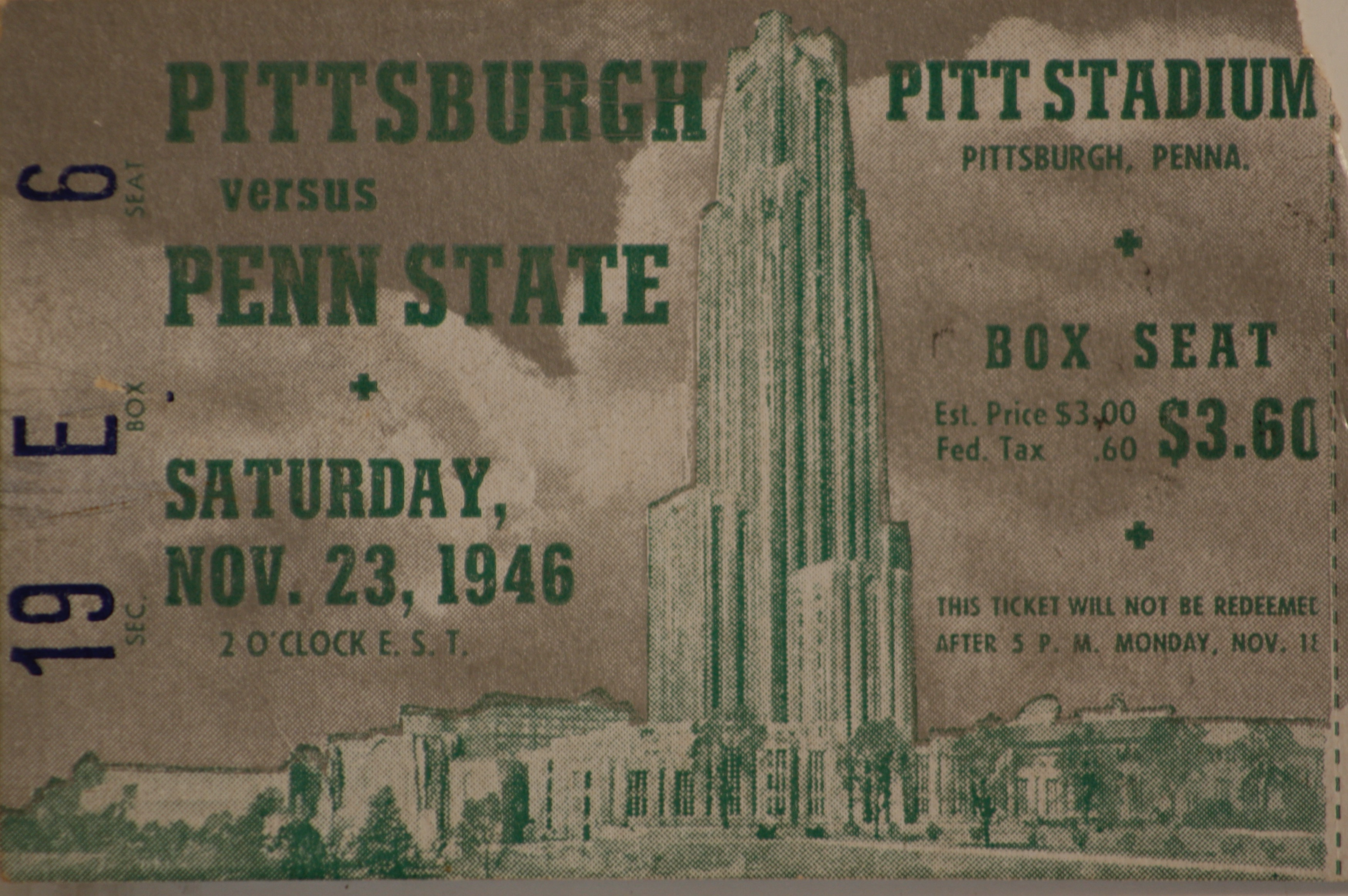
Ticket stub for November 23 game versus Penn State

On November 23, Pitt's final game of the season was against Bob Higgins' Penn State Lions who sported a 6–1 record. Pitt led the series 26–17–2, and was on a 2-game win streak over the Lions. The Lions led the nation in defense by giving up only 139.6 yards per game. Coach Higgins' roster had 15 veterans of previous Pitt versus Penn State games. Due to the ongoing hotel strike, the Lions stayed in Ligonier, PA until Saturday morning. The Pitt band members each volunteered to house a Penn State band member, so the Nittanies would have their own band in attendance.

Three Panther linemen were playing their final game for Pitt. Tackles Jack Durishan and Martin Rosepink plus guard George Ranii were on track to graduate. Coach Fesler started Ranii at right guard in place of Bernie Barkouskie.

The Panthers scored first and held off the Staters to win 14–7, and make it three in a row over their in-state rival. In the second quarter, the Panthers managed a 6-play, 66-yard drive with Bill Abraham scoring from the 2-yard line. Bill Coury was good on the placement and Pitt led 7–0 at halftime. After a scoreless third period, the Panthers advanced 78 yards in 9 plays early in the final quarter. Lou Cecconi completed a 12-yard touchdown pass to Leo Skladany and Coury's extra point upped Pitt's lead to 14–0. The Lions scored after a late 9-play, 60-yard drive that ended with a Bob Weltzel 6-yard run. Ed Czekaj's placement was good. Pitt was deep in Penn State territory when the game ended. The Pitt offense gained 294 yards against the #1 ranked State defense, and the Pitt defense stopped the Lions twice inside the Panther 5-yard line.

The starting lineup for the game against Penn State was Leo Skladany (left end), Jack Durishan (left tackle), George Ranii (left guard), Henry Clougherty (center), John Kosh (right guard), Robert Plotz (right tackle), Bill McPeak (right end), Carl DePasqua (quarterback), Robert Lee (left halfback), William Abraham (right halfback) and William Bruno (fullback). Substitutes appearing in the game for Pitt were Walt Cummins, William Goelz, Martin Rosepink, Wilbur Forsythe, Mike Roussos, Bernie Barkouskie, William Coury, Ralph Coleman, Sam Haddad, Louis Cecconi, John LaFrankie and Lindara Lauro.

Scoring summary

Quarter	Time	Drive			Team	Scoring information	Score	
Quarter	Time	Plays	Yards	TOP	Team	Scoring information	Penn State	Pittsburgh
2		6	66		Pittsburgh	Bill Abraham 2-yard touchdown run, Bill Coury kick good	0	7
4		9	78		Pittsburgh	Leo Skladany 12-yard touchdown reception from Lou Cecconi, Bill Coury kick good	0	14
4		9	60		Penn State	Bob Weltzel 6-yard touchdown run, Ed Czekaj kick good	7	14
"TOP" = time of possession. For other American football terms, see Glossary of American football.							7	14}

== Individual scoring summary ==
1946 Pittsburgh Panthers scoring summary
Player	Touchdowns	Extra points	Field goals	Safety	Points
Louis Cecconi	4	4	0	0	28
Bill Abraham	3	0	0	0	18
Leo Skladany	2	0	0	1	14
William Bruno	2	0	0	0	12
William McPeak	2	0	0	0	12
William Coury	0	3	0	0	6
Ralph Short	0	1	0	0	1
Totals	13	8	0	1	88
