= 1946 Merchant Marine Mariners football team =

American college football season

1946 Merchant Marine Mariners football
- Conference: Independent
- Record: 4–7
- Head coach: Bill Reinhart (1st season)
- Home stadium: Kendrick Field

1946 Eastern major college football independents records
	Conf.			Overall
Team	W	L	T	W		L		T
No. 2 Army		–		9	–	0	–	1
Rutgers		–		7	–	2	–	0
Penn State		–		6	–	2	–	0
Boston College		–		6	–	3	–	0
Holy Cross		–		5	–	4	–	0
NYU		–		5	–	3	–	0
Villanova		–		6	–	4	–	0
Colgate		–		4	–	4	–	0
Syracuse		–		4	–	5	–	0
Pittsburgh		–		3	–	5	–	1
Temple		–		2	–	4	–	2
Merchant Marine		–		4	–	7	–	0
Bucknell		–		3	–	6	–	0
Lafayette		–		2	–	7	–	0
Fordham		–		0	–	7	–	0
Rankings from AP Poll

The 1946 Merchant Marine Mariners football team was an American football team that represented the United States Merchant Marine Academy at Kings Point, New York, during the 1946 college football season. In its first season under head coach Bill Reinhart, the team compiled a 4–7 record and was outscored by a total of 259 to 173. In addition to being the head coach, Reinhart was a commander in the United States Merchant Marine and served as the academy's athletic director.

The team played its home games at Kendrick Field in Kings Point, New York.

== Schedule ==
Date	Opponent	Site	Result	Attendance	Source
September 14	at Villanova	Villanova Stadium; Villanova, PA	L 6–40	13,000	
September 21	Lehigh	Kendrick Field; Kings Point, NY	L 0–7	4,000	
September 28	at Yale	Yale Bowl; New Haven, CT	L 0–33	21,000	
October 5	George Washington	Kendrick Field; Kings Point, NY	L 18–37		
October 11	at Boston College	Braves Field; Boston, MA	L 7–56	21,000	
October 19	at Colgate	Colgate Athletic Field; Hamilton, NY	L 7–47	5,000	
October 26	Fordham	Kendrick Field; Kings Point, NY	W 7–6	10,000	
November 2	Wagner	Kendrick Field; Kings Point, NY	W 60–0		
November 9	at Brooklyn	Kingsmen Field; Brooklyn, NY	W 41–7	4,000	
November 16	St. Bonaventure	Kendrick Field; Kings Point, NY	L 0–26		
November 23	Hofstra	Kendrick Field; Kings Point, NY	W 27–0	4,000	
