= 1946 Temple Owls football team =

American college football season

1946 Temple Owls football
- Conference: Independent
- Record: 2–4–2
- Head coach: Ray Morrison (7th season)
- Home stadium: Temple Stadium

1946 Eastern major college football independents records
| | Conf. | | | Overall |
| Team | W | L | T | W | | L | | T |
|---|---|---|---|---|---|---|---|---|
| No. 2 Army | | – | | 9 | – | 0 | – | 1 |
| Rutgers | | – | | 7 | – | 2 | – | 0 |
| Penn State | | – | | 6 | – | 2 | – | 0 |
| Boston College | | – | | 6 | – | 3 | – | 0 |
| Holy Cross | | – | | 5 | – | 4 | – | 0 |
| NYU | | – | | 5 | – | 3 | – | 0 |
| Villanova | | – | | 6 | – | 4 | – | 0 |
| Colgate | | – | | 4 | – | 4 | – | 0 |
| Syracuse | | – | | 4 | – | 5 | – | 0 |
| Pittsburgh | | – | | 3 | – | 5 | – | 1 |
| Temple | | – | | 2 | – | 4 | – | 2 |
| Merchant Marine | | – | | 4 | – | 7 | – | 0 |
| Bucknell | | – | | 3 | – | 6 | – | 0 |
| Lafayette | | – | | 2 | – | 7 | – | 0 |
| Fordham | | – | | 0 | – | 7 | – | 0 |
Rankings from AP Poll

The 1946 Temple Owls football team was an American football team that represented Temple University as an independent during the 1946 college football season. In its seventh season under head coach Ray Morrison, the team compiled a 2–4–2 record and was outscored by a total of 114 to 61.

Temple was ranked at No. 66 in the final Litkenhous Difference by Score System rankings for 1946.

The team played its home games at Temple Stadium in Philadelphia.

== Schedule ==
| Date | Opponent | Site | Result | Attendance | Source |
|---|---|---|---|---|---|
| September 27 | SMU | Temple Stadium; Philadelphia, PA | T 7–7 | 30,000 | |
| October 4 | Georgia | Temple Stadium; Philadelphia, PA | L 7–35 | 35,000 | |
| October 12 | at Pittsburgh | Pitt Stadium; Pittsburgh, PA | T 0–0 | 3,000 | |
| October 18 | West Virginia | Temple Stadium; Philadelphia, PA | W 6–0 | 20,000 | |
| November 2 | at Syracuse | Archbold Stadium; Syracuse, NY | L 7–28 | 10,000 | |
| November 9 | at Penn State | New Beaver Field; State College, PA | L 0–26 | 15,000 | |
| November 16 | Bucknell | Temple Stadium; Philadelphia, PA | W 27–6 | 10,000 | |
| November 23 | Holy Cross | Temple Stadium; Philadelphia, PA | L 7–12 | 10,000 | |
