= 1946 Syracuse Orangemen football team =

American college football season

1946 Syracuse Orangemen football
- Conference: Independent
- Record: 4–5
- Head coach: Biggie Munn (1st season)
- Captain: Richard Whitesell
- Home stadium: Archbold Stadium

1946 Eastern major college football independents records
	Conf.			Overall
Team	W	L	T	W		L		T
No. 2 Army		–		9	–	0	–	1
Rutgers		–		7	–	2	–	0
Penn State		–		6	–	2	–	0
Boston College		–		6	–	3	–	0
Holy Cross		–		5	–	4	–	0
NYU		–		5	–	3	–	0
Villanova		–		6	–	4	–	0
Colgate		–		4	–	4	–	0
Syracuse		–		4	–	5	–	0
Pittsburgh		–		3	–	5	–	1
Temple		–		2	–	4	–	2
Merchant Marine		–		4	–	7	–	0
Bucknell		–		3	–	6	–	0
Lafayette		–		2	–	7	–	0
Fordham		–		0	–	7	–	0
Rankings from AP Poll

The 1946 Syracuse Orangemen football team represented Syracuse University as an independent during the 1946 college football season. The Orangemen were led by head coach Biggie Munn, in his first and only year with the team. Munn left to take the head coaching position at Michigan State, where he would later win several national titles. The Orangemen compiled a record of 4–5 under Munn.

During the season Miami Hurricanes cancelled a scheduled game against the Penn State team as Miami officials felt that Penn State fielding their two African American in Miami could have led to "unfortunate incidents". Miami reportedly invited Syracuse to replace Penn State. This invitation was promptly declined and rebuked in an editorial in The Daily Orange, titled "No Thanks, Miami".

Syracuse was ranked at No. 63 in the final Litkenhous Difference by Score System rankings for 1946.

== Schedule ==
Date	Opponent	Site	Result	Attendance	Source
September 28	Boston University	Archbold Stadium; Syracuse, NY	W 41–6	32,000	
October 5	at Dartmouth	Memorial Field; Hanover, NH	L 14–20	10,000	
October 12	Penn State	Archbold Stadium; Syracuse, NY (rivalry)	L 0–9	10,000	
October 19	at Holy Cross	Fitton Field; Worcester, MA	W 21–12	20,000	
October 26	at West Virginia	Mountaineer Field; Morgantown, WV (rivalry)	L 0–13	18,000	
November 2	Temple	Archbold Stadium; Syracuse, NY	W 28–7	12,000	
November 9	at Cornell	Schoellkopf Field; Ithaca, NY	W 14–7	30,000	
November 16	Colgate	Archbold Stadium; Syracuse, NY (rivalry)	L 7–25	36,000	
November 23	at Columbia	Baker Field; New York, NY	L 21–59	30,000	

== After the season ==
The 1947 NFL draft was held on December 16, 1946. The following Orangeman was selected.

Round	Pick	Player	Position	NFL club
7	47	Joe Watt	Halfback	Boston Yanks
