= 1946 Fordham Rams football team =

American college football season

1946 Fordham Rams football
- Conference: Independent
- Record: 0–7
- Head coach: Ed Danowski (1st season)
- Home stadium: Polo Grounds

1946 Eastern major college football independents records
	Conf.			Overall
Team	W	L	T	W		L		T
No. 2 Army		–		9	–	0	–	1
Rutgers		–		7	–	2	–	0
Penn State		–		6	–	2	–	0
Boston College		–		6	–	3	–	0
Holy Cross		–		5	–	4	–	0
NYU		–		5	–	3	–	0
Villanova		–		6	–	4	–	0
Colgate		–		4	–	4	–	0
Syracuse		–		4	–	5	–	0
Pittsburgh		–		3	–	5	–	1
Temple		–		2	–	4	–	2
Merchant Marine		–		4	–	7	–	0
Bucknell		–		3	–	6	–	0
Lafayette		–		2	–	7	–	0
Fordham		–		0	–	7	–	0
Rankings from AP Poll

The 1946 Fordham Rams football team represented Fordham University as an independent during the 1946 college football season. Led by first-year head coach Ed Danowski, Fordham compiled a record of 0–7.

== Schedule ==
Date	Opponent	Site	Result	Attendance	Source
October 11	at Georgetown	Griffith Stadium; Washington, DC	L 7–8	15,752	
October 19	Saint Mary's	Polo Grounds; New York, NY	L 2–33	30,798	
October 26	at Merchant Marine	Tomb Field; Kings Point, NY	L 6–7	10,000	
November 2	at Penn State	New Beaver Field; State College, PA	L 0–68	14,000	
November 9	at West Virginia	Mountaineer Field; Morgantown, WV	L 0–39	13,000	
November 16	vs. NYU	Yankee Stadium; Bronx, NY	L 28–33	28,000	
November 22	at No. 9 LSU	Tiger Stadium; Baton Rouge, LA	L 0–40	15,000	
Rankings from AP Poll released prior to the game
