= 1946 Villanova Wildcats football team =

American college football season

1946 Villanova Wildcats football
- Conference: Independent
- Record: 6–4
- Head coach: Jordan Olivar (4th season)
- Captain: William Sullivan
- Home stadium: Shibe Park, Villanova Stadium

1946 Eastern major college football independents records
	Conf.			Overall
Team	W	L	T	W		L		T
No. 2 Army		–		9	–	0	–	1
Rutgers		–		7	–	2	–	0
Penn State		–		6	–	2	–	0
Boston College		–		6	–	3	–	0
Holy Cross		–		5	–	4	–	0
NYU		–		5	–	3	–	0
Villanova		–		6	–	4	–	0
Colgate		–		4	–	4	–	0
Syracuse		–		4	–	5	–	0
Pittsburgh		–		3	–	5	–	1
Temple		–		2	–	4	–	2
Merchant Marine		–		4	–	7	–	0
Bucknell		–		3	–	6	–	0
Lafayette		–		2	–	7	–	0
Fordham		–		0	–	7	–	0
Rankings from AP Poll

The 1946 Villanova Wildcats football team was an American football team that represented Villanova University as an independent during the 1946 college football season. In their fourth season under head coach Jordan Olivar, the Wildcats compiled a 6–4 record and outscored opponents by a total of 182 to 142.

Halfback Joseph Rogers led Villanova and ranked 15th nationally with 620 rushing yards and averaged 6.89 yards per carry.

Villanova was ranked at No. 47 in the final Litkenhous Difference by Score System rankings for 1946.

The team played two home games at Shibe Park in Philadelphia and one at Villanova Stadium in Villanova, Pennsylvania.

== Schedule ==
Date	Opponent	Site	Result	Attendance	Source
September 14	Merchant Marine	Villanova Stadium; Villanova, PA	W 40–6	13,000	
September 21	at Army	Michie Stadium; West Point, NY	L 0–35	16,500	
September 28	at Navy	Thompson Stadium; Annapolis, MD	L 0–7	18,502	
October 4	Marquette	Shibe Park; Philadelphia, PA	W 26–13	21,000	
October 12	at Holy Cross	Fitton Field; Worcester, MA	W 14–13	20,000	
October 19	Georgetown	Shibe Park; Philadelphia, PA	W 19–2	22,000	
October 25	at Boston College	Braves Field; Boston, MA	L 12–14	32,800	
November 1	Miami (FL)	Shibe Park; Philadelphia, PA	L 21–26	26,000	
November 8	at Detroit	University of Detroit Stadium; Detroit, MI	W 23–6	19,350	
November 16	at Florida	Florida Field; Gainesville, FL	W 27–20	15,000	

== After the season ==
The 1947 NFL draft was held on December 16, 1946. The following Wildcat was selected.

Round	Pick	Player	Position	NFL club
27	253	Bob David	Guard	Los Angeles Rams
