= 1946 Boston College Eagles football team =

American college football season

1946 Boston College Eagles football
- Conference: Independent
- Record: 6–3
- Head coach: Denny Myers (3rd season)
- Captain: Game captains
- Home stadium: Braves Field

1946 Eastern major college football independents records
	Conf.			Overall
Team	W	L	T	W		L		T
No. 2 Army		–		9	–	0	–	1
Rutgers		–		7	–	2	–	0
Penn State		–		6	–	2	–	0
Boston College		–		6	–	3	–	0
Holy Cross		–		5	–	4	–	0
NYU		–		5	–	3	–	0
Villanova		–		6	–	4	–	0
Colgate		–		4	–	4	–	0
Syracuse		–		4	–	5	–	0
Pittsburgh		–		3	–	5	–	1
Temple		–		2	–	4	–	2
Merchant Marine		–		4	–	7	–	0
Bucknell		–		3	–	6	–	0
Lafayette		–		2	–	7	–	0
Fordham		–		0	–	7	–	0
Rankings from AP Poll

The 1946 Boston College Eagles football team was an American football team that represented Boston College as an independent during the 1946 college football season. The Eagles were led by third-year head coach Denny Myers, who returned to coach the team after serving in the United States Navy during the previous three seasons. The team compiled a 6–3 record and outscored opponents by a total of 235 to 123.

The Eagles ranked ninth nationally in total offense with an average of 351.0 yards per game. They also ranked third nationally in passing offense (140.7 passing yards per game), 11th nationally in total defense (giving up 176.8 yards per game), 15th nationally in scoring offense (26.0 points per game).

Boston College was ranked at No. 44 in the final Litkenhous Difference by Score System rankings for 1946.

The team played it home games at Braves Field in Boston, Massachusetts.

== Schedule ==
Date	Opponent	Rank	Site	Result	Attendance	Source
September 27	Wake Forest		Braves Field; Boston, MA	L 6–12	38,500	
October 5	at Michigan State		Macklin Field; East Lansing, MI	W 34–20	21,015	
October 11	Merchant Marine		Braves Field; Boston, MA	W 56–7	21,000	
October 25	Villanova		Braves Field; Boston, MA	W 14–12	32,800	
November 2	at NYU		Polo Grounds; New York, NY	W 72–6	8,000	
November 9	Georgetown		Braves Field; Boston, MA	W 20–13	19,800	
November 16	No. 8 Tennessee		Braves Field; Boston, MA	L 13–33	38,000	
November 23	Alabama		Braves Field; Boston, MA	W 13–7	41,000	
November 30	Holy Cross	No. 17	Braves Field; Boston, MA (rivalry)	L 6–13	43,000	
Rankings from AP Poll released prior to the game

== Rankings ==
Ranking movements Legend: ██ Increase in ranking ██ Decrease in ranking — = Not ranked т = Tied with team above or below
	Week								
Poll	1	2	3	4	5	6	7	8	Final
AP	—	—	—	—	—	—	—	17т	—

== After the season ==
The 1947 NFL draft was held on December 16, 1946. The following Eagles were selected.

Round	Pick	Player	Position	NFL club
14	123	John Kissell	Defensive tackle	Los Angeles Rams
22	204	Art Donovan	Defensive tackle	New York Giants
