= 1946 Penn State Nittany Lions football team =

American college football season

1946 Penn State Nittany Lions football
- Conference: Independent
- Record: 6–2
- Head coach: Bob Higgins (17th season)
- Captains: Red Moore; Bucky Walters
- Home stadium: New Beaver Field

1946 Eastern major college football independents records
	Conf.			Overall
Team	W	L	T	W		L		T
No. 2 Army		–		9	–	0	–	1
Rutgers		–		7	–	2	–	0
Penn State		–		6	–	2	–	0
Boston College		–		6	–	3	–	0
Holy Cross		–		5	–	4	–	0
NYU		–		5	–	3	–	0
Villanova		–		6	–	4	–	0
Colgate		–		4	–	4	–	0
Syracuse		–		4	–	5	–	0
Pittsburgh		–		3	–	5	–	1
Temple		–		2	–	4	–	2
Merchant Marine		–		4	–	7	–	0
Bucknell		–		3	–	6	–	0
Lafayette		–		2	–	7	–	0
Fordham		–		0	–	7	–	0
Rankings from AP Poll

The 1946 Penn State Nittany Lions football team was an American football team that represented Pennsylvania State University as an independent during the 1946 college football season. In their 17th year under head coach Bob Higgins, the Nittany Lions compiled a 6–2 record and outscored opponents by a total of 192 to 48.

Penn State halfback Maderak was selected by the International News Service as a second-team player on the 1946 All-Eastern football team.

The team voted to cancel a scheduled game against the Miami Hurricanes rather than playing without African American players.

Penn State was ranked at No. 24 in the final Litkenhous Difference by Score System rankings for 1946.

The team played its home games in New Beaver Field in State College, Pennsylvania.

== Schedule ==
Date	Opponent	Site	Result	Attendance	Source
October 5	Bucknell	New Beaver Field; State College, PA	W 48–6	12,401	
October 12	at Syracuse	Archbold Stadium; Syracuse, NY (rivalry)	W 9–0	10,000	
October 19	Michigan State^{†}	New Beaver Field; State College, PA (rivalry)	L 16–19	20,000	
October 26	at Colgate	Colgate Athletic Field; Hamilton, NY	W 6–2	13,500	
November 2	Fordham	New Beaver Field; State College, PA	W 68–0	10,305	
November 9	Temple	New Beaver Field; State College, PA	W 26–0	13,356	
November 16	at Navy	Thompson Stadium; Annapolis, MD	W 12–7	22,000	
November 23	at Pittsburgh	Pitt Stadium; Pittsburgh, PA (rivalry)	L 7–14	50,000	
November 29	at Miami (FL)	Burdine Stadium; Miami, FL	canceled		
^{†}Homecoming

The scheduled game against the Miami Hurricanes was cancelled in early November by unanimous vote of the Penn State team. Miami officials felt that Penn State fielding their African American players Wallace Triplett and Dennis Hoggard in Miami could have led to "unfortunate incidents", and the team chose to cancel the game rather than playing without Triplett and Hoggard. Miami reportedly invited Syracuse to replace Penn State. This invitation was promptly declined and rebuked in an editorial in The Daily Orange, titled "No Thanks, Miami".

== After the season ==
The 1947 NFL draft was held on December 16, 1946. The following Nittany Lions were selected.

Round	Pick	Player	Position	NFL club
7	53	Bill Smyth	Defensive end	Los Angeles Rams
16	140	Jeff Durkota	Fullback	Philadelphia Eagles
26	240	Larry Joe	Back	Chicago Cardinals
30	279	Joe Colone	Back	Washington Redskins
