= 1946 Holy Cross Crusaders football team =

American college football season

1946 Holy Cross Crusaders football
- Conference: Independent
- Record: 5–4
- Head coach: Ox DaGrosa (2nd season)
- Home stadium: Fitton Field

1946 Eastern major college football independents records
	Conf.			Overall
Team	W	L	T	W		L		T
No. 2 Army		–		9	–	0	–	1
Rutgers		–		7	–	2	–	0
Penn State		–		6	–	2	–	0
Boston College		–		6	–	3	–	0
Holy Cross		–		5	–	4	–	0
NYU		–		5	–	3	–	0
Villanova		–		6	–	4	–	0
Colgate		–		4	–	4	–	0
Syracuse		–		4	–	5	–	0
Pittsburgh		–		3	–	5	–	1
Temple		–		2	–	4	–	2
Merchant Marine		–		4	–	7	–	0
Bucknell		–		3	–	6	–	0
Lafayette		–		2	–	7	–	0
Fordham		–		0	–	7	–	0
Rankings from AP Poll

The 1946 Holy Cross Crusaders football team was an American football team that represented the College of the Holy Cross as an independent during the 1946 college football season. In its second year under head coach Ox DaGrosa, the team compiled a 5–4 record.

The Crusaders led the nation in passing defense, giving up only 53.7 passing yards per game. They also ranked thirteenth in total defense, allowing 178.8 yards per game.

Holy Cross was ranked at No. 55 in the final Litkenhous Difference by Score System rankings for 1946.

The team played its home games at Fitton Field in Worcester, Massachusetts.

== Schedule ==
Date	Opponent	Site	Result	Attendance	Source
September 28	Dartmouth	Fitton Field; Worcester, MA	L 0–3	24,000	
October 5	Detroit	Fitton Field; Worcester, MA	W 16–14	20,000	
October 12	Villanova	Fitton Field; Worcester, MA	L 13–14	20,000	
October 19	Syracuse	Fitton Field; Worcester, MA	L 12–21	20,000	
October 26	at Harvard	Harvard Stadium; Boston, MA	L 6–13	40,000	
November 2	Brown	Fitton Field; Worcester, MA	W 21–19	15,000	
November 9	Colgate	Fitton Field; Worcester, MA	W 21–6	15,000	
November 23	at Temple	Temple Stadium; Philadelphia, PA	W 12–7	10,000	
November 30	at Boston College	Braves Field; Boston, MA	W 13–6	43,081	

== Rankings ==
Ranking movements Legend: ██ Increase in ranking ██ Decrease in ranking — = Not ranked
	Week								
Poll	1	2	3	4	5	6	7	8	Final
AP	—	—	—	—	—	19	—	—	—

== After the season ==
The 1947 NFL draft was held on December 16, 1946. The following Crusaders were selected.

Round	Pick	Player	Position	NFL club
12	97	Wally Roberts	End	Boston Yanks
15	127	Frank Parker	Tackle	Boston Yanks
18	158	Bill Cregar	Guard	Pittsburgh Steelers
29	273	John Comer	Back	Los Angeles Rams
