= 1946 Colgate Red Raiders football team =

American college football season

1946 Colgate Red Raiders football
- Conference: Independent
- Record: 4–4
- Head coach: Andrew Kerr (18th season)
- Captain: Robert Orlando
- Home stadium: Colgate Athletic Field

1946 Eastern major college football independents records
	Conf.			Overall
Team	W	L	T	W		L		T
No. 2 Army		–		9	–	0	–	1
Rutgers		–		7	–	2	–	0
Penn State		–		6	–	2	–	0
Boston College		–		6	–	3	–	0
Holy Cross		–		5	–	4	–	0
NYU		–		5	–	3	–	0
Villanova		–		6	–	4	–	0
Colgate		–		4	–	4	–	0
Syracuse		–		4	–	5	–	0
Pittsburgh		–		3	–	5	–	1
Temple		–		2	–	4	–	2
Merchant Marine		–		4	–	7	–	0
Bucknell		–		3	–	6	–	0
Lafayette		–		2	–	7	–	0
Fordham		–		0	–	7	–	0
Rankings from AP Poll

The 1946 Colgate Red Raiders football team was an American football team that represented Colgate University as an independent during the 1946 college football season. In its 18th and final season under head coach Andrew Kerr, the team compiled a 4–4 record and outscored opponents by a total of 154 to 95. Robert Orlando was the team captain.

In Kerr's final game as Colgate's head coach, the team trailed 7–0 to Brown at halftime. Kerr gave a speech asking his team to score three touchdowns in the second half. The team complied and sent Kerr out as a winner.

Colgate was ranked at No. 53 in the final Litkenhous Difference by Score System rankings for 1946.

The team played its home games at Colgate Athletic Field in Hamilton, New York.

== Schedule ==
Date	Opponent	Site	Result	Attendance	Source
October 5	at Yale	Yale Bowl; New Haven, CT	L 6–27	38,000	
October 12	at Cornell	Schoellkopf Field; Ithaca, NY (rivalry)	L 9–13	20,000	
October 19	Merchant Marine	Colgate Athletic Field; Hamilton, NY	W 47–7	5,000	
October 26	Penn State	Colgate Athletic Field; Hamilton, NY	L 2–6	15,000	
November 2	at Lafayette	Fisher Field; Easton, PA	W 39–0	5,000	
November 9	at Holy Cross	Fitton Field; Worcester, MA	L 6–21	15,000	
November 16	at Syracuse	Archbold Stadium; Syracuse, NY (rivalry)	W 25–7	36,000	
November 28	at Brown	Brown Stadium; Providence, RI	W 20–14	20,000	

== After the season ==
The 1947 NFL draft was held on December 16, 1946. The following Red Raiders were selected.

Round	Pick	Player	Position	NFL club
8	64	Frank Muehlheuser	Fullback	New York Giants
16	144	Bob Orlando	Guard	New York Giants
