= 1946 NYU Violets football team =

American college football season

1946 NYU Violets football
- Conference: Independent
- Record: 5–3
- Head coach: John J. Weinheimer (3rd season)
- Home stadium: Ohio Field, Polo Grounds, Yankee Stadium

1946 Eastern major college football independents records
	Conf.			Overall
Team	W	L	T	W		L		T
No. 2 Army		–		9	–	0	–	1
Rutgers		–		7	–	2	–	0
Penn State		–		6	–	2	–	0
Boston College		–		6	–	3	–	0
Holy Cross		–		5	–	4	–	0
NYU		–		5	–	3	–	0
Villanova		–		6	–	4	–	0
Colgate		–		4	–	4	–	0
Syracuse		–		4	–	5	–	0
Pittsburgh		–		3	–	5	–	1
Temple		–		2	–	4	–	2
Merchant Marine		–		4	–	7	–	0
Bucknell		–		3	–	6	–	0
Lafayette		–		2	–	7	–	0
Fordham		–		0	–	7	–	0
Rankings from AP Poll

The 1946 NYU Violets football team was an American football team that represented New York University as an independent during the 1946 college football season.

In their third and final season under head coach John J. Weinheimer, the Violets compiled a 5–3 record, their first winning record of the 1940s, though they were outscored 163–101.

NYU's home opener featured its first return to Manhattan since 1941, with a visit to its former home field at the Polo Grounds. The Violets closed out the year with two dates at another former home field, the original Yankee Stadium. The team played just one game at its on-campus home field, Ohio Field in University Heights, The Bronx.

== Schedule ==
Date	Opponent	Site	Result	Attendance	Source
October 5	at Brooklyn	Ebbets Field; Brooklyn, NY	W 19–8	20,000	
October 12	Rutgers	Polo Grounds; New York, NY	L 0–26	10,000	
October 19	at Rochester	River Campus Stadium; Rochester, NY	W 6–0	8,000	
October 26	Gettysburg	Ohio Field; Bronx, NY	W 12–7	5,000	
November 2	Boston College	Polo Grounds; New York, NY	L 6–72	8,000	
November 9	at Lehigh	Taylor Stadium; Bethlehem, PA	W 13–3	3,000	
November 16	vs. Fordham	Yankee Stadium; Bronx, NY	W 33–28	28,000	
November 24	Georgetown	Yankee Stadium; Bronx, NY	L 12–19	10,000	
