= Al Humphreys =

American football coach and college athletics administrator

Biographical details
- Born: March 22, 1902; Wolcott, Indiana, U.S.
- Died: June 29, 1962 (aged 60); Danville, Pennsylvania, U.S.

Coaching career (HC unless noted)
- 1927–1932: Cook Academy
- 1933–1936: North Tonawanda HS (NY)
- 1937–1942: Bucknell
- 1946: Bucknell

Administrative career (AD unless noted)
- 1947–1962: Bucknell

Head coaching record
- Overall: 30–24–5 (college)

Albert Edward Humphreys (March 22, 1902 – June 29, 1962) was an American football coach and college athletics administrator. He was born in Wolcott, Indiana, and attended the University of Illinois. He became employed by Bucknell University in 1937 and served as the school's head football coach for seven years (1937–1942, 1946) and then as its athletic director from 1947 to 1962.

== Head coaching record ==
=== College ===
Year	Team	Overall	Conference	Standing	Bowl/playoffs
Bucknell Bison (Independent) (1937–1942)
1937	Bucknell	3–3–2			
1938	Bucknell	5–3			
1939	Bucknell	3–5			
1940	Bucknell	4–2–2			
1941	Bucknell	6–3			
1942	Bucknell	6–2–1			
Bucknell Bison (Independent) (1946)
1946	Bucknell	3–6			
Bucknell:		30–24–5			
Total:		30–24–5			
