= 1946 Lehigh Engineers football team =

American college football season

1946 Lehigh Engineers football
- Conference: Middle Three Conference
- Record: 2–6 (0–2 Middle Three)
- Head coach: Bill Leckonby (1st season)
- Home stadium: Taylor Stadium

1946 Middle Three Conference football standings
	Conf.					Overall
Team	W		L		T	W		L		T
Rutgers $	2	–	0	–	0	7	–	2	–	0
Lafayette	1	–	1	–	0	2	–	7	–	0
Lehigh	0	–	2	–	0	2	–	6	–	0
$ – Conference champion

The 1946 Lehigh Engineers football team was an American football team that represented Lehigh University during the 1946 college football season. In its first season under head coach Bill Leckonby, the team compiled a 2–6 record, and lost both games against its Middle Three Conference rivals. Lehigh played home games at Taylor Stadium in Bethlehem, Pennsylvania.

== Schedule ==
Date	Opponent	Site	Result	Attendance	Source
September 21	at Merchant Marine*	Kendrick Field; Kings Point, NY	W 7–0	4,000	
September 28	Gettysburg*	Taylor Stadium; Bethlehem, PA	W 28–7	8,000	
October 5	at Dickinson*	Biddle Field; Carlisle, PA	L 6–7	6,000	
October 26	at Connecticut*	Gardner Dow Athletic Fields; Storrs, CT	W 10–0	4,500	
November 2	Muhlenberg*	Taylor Stadium; Bethlehem, PA	L 7–40	10,000	
November 9	NYU*	Taylor Stadium; Bethlehem, PA	L 3–13	3,000	
November 16	Rutgers	Taylor Stadium; Bethlehem, PA	L 6–55	7,000	
November 23	at Lafayette	Fisher Field; Easton, PA (rivalry)	L 0–13	15,000	
*Non-conference game
