= 1946 Bucknell Bison football team =

American college football season

1946 Bucknell Bison football
- Conference: Independent
- Record: 3–6
- Head coach: Al Humphreys (7th season)
- Captain: Gene Hubka
- Home stadium: Memorial Stadium

1946 Eastern major college football independents records
	Conf.			Overall
Team	W	L	T	W		L		T
No. 2 Army		–		9	–	0	–	1
Rutgers		–		7	–	2	–	0
Penn State		–		6	–	2	–	0
Boston College		–		6	–	3	–	0
Holy Cross		–		5	–	4	–	0
NYU		–		5	–	3	–	0
Villanova		–		6	–	4	–	0
Colgate		–		4	–	4	–	0
Syracuse		–		4	–	5	–	0
Pittsburgh		–		3	–	5	–	1
Temple		–		2	–	4	–	2
Merchant Marine		–		4	–	7	–	0
Bucknell		–		3	–	6	–	0
Lafayette		–		2	–	7	–	0
Fordham		–		0	–	7	–	0
Rankings from AP Poll

The 1946 Bucknell Bison football team was an American football team that represented Bucknell University as an independent during the 1946 college football season. In its seventh season under head coach Al Humphreys, the team compiled a 3–6 record. Gene Hubka was the team captain.

The team played its home games at Memorial Stadium on the university campus in Lewisburg, Pennsylvania.

== Schedule ==
Date	Opponent	Site	Result	Attendance	Source
September 28	at Cornell	Schoellkopf Field; Ithaca, NY	L 0–21	7,000	
October 5	at Penn State	New Beaver Field; State College, PA	L 6–48	14,000	
October 12	Muhlenberg	Memorial Stadium; Lewisburg, PA	L 0–6		
October 19	at Buffalo	Civic Stadium; Buffalo, NY	W 21–0		
October 26	Lafayette^{†}	Memorial Stadium; Lewisburg, PA	W 29–0	12,000	
November 2	Gettysburg	Memorial Stadium; Lewisburg, PA	W 19–0	2,000	
November 9	Delaware	Memorial Stadium; Lewisburg, PA	L 14–27	4,000–6,000	
November 16	at Temple	Temple Stadium; Philadelphia, PA	L 6–27	10,000	
November 23	at Rutgers	Rutgers Stadium; Piscataway, NJ	L 0–25	15,000	
^{†}Homecoming

== After the season ==
The 1947 NFL Draft was held on December 16, 1946. The following Bison was selected.

Round	Pick	Player	Position	NFL Club
29	267	Tom Rodgers	Tackle	Boston Yanks
