= Paul Patterson (American football) =

American football player (1927–1982)

No. 83
- Positions: Wingback, defensive back

Personal information
- Born: February 16, 1927; Aurora, Illinois, U.S.
- Died: June 11, 1982 (aged 55); Chicago, Illinois, U.S.
- Listed height: 5 ft 9 in (1.75 m)
- Listed weight: 185 lb (84 kg)

Career information
- High school: East Aurora
- College: Illinois
- NFL draft: 1949: undrafted

Career history
- Chicago Hornets (1949)
- Stats at Pro Football Reference

Paul L. Patterson (February 16, 1927 – June 11, 1982) was an American professional football player for the Chicago Hornets of the All-America Football Conference (AAFC). He played college football for the Illinois Fighting Illini.

== Early life ==
Paul L. Patterson was born on February 16, 1927, in Aurora, Illinois. He participated in high school football, basketball, and track at East Aurora. He earned 11 varsity letters during high school.

== College career ==
Patterson enrolled at the University of Illinois to play college football for the Fighting Illini. He was a letterman in 1944, 1946, 1947, and 1948 at halfback. He performed most of the passing for the Illini during the 1944 season. Patterson missed the 1945 season while serving in the United States Navy. In February 1945, the Chicago Tribune called him a "star Negro passer".

== Professional career ==
Patterson started all 12 games for the Chicago Hornets of the All-America Football Conference (AAFC) in 1949, totaling 16 receptions for 304 yards and four touchdowns, four punt returns for 33 yards, and three interceptions for 104 yards. He was tied with Ray Ramsey for the team-lead in receiving touchdowns with four. Patterson led the team in interception return yards while tying Hardy Brown and George Strohmeyer for the team-lead in interceptions with three each.

== Personal life ==
Patterson later worked as a Chicago sales representative for a beer company. He was a scout for the Chicago Bears from 1967 until his death in 1982. He died on June 11, 1982, in Chicago. He had spent the prior four weeks at Mayo Clinic in Rochester, Minnesota, where he had surgery for diabetes.
