= 1946 Lafayette Leopards football team =

American football club

1946 Lafayette Leopards football
- Conference: Middle Three Conference
- Record: 2–7 (1–1 Middle Three)
- Head coach: Edward Mylin (7th season)
- Captain: Ed Whiteman
- Home stadium: Fisher Field

1946 Middle Three Conference football standings
	Conf.					Overall
Team	W		L		T	W		L		T
Rutgers $	2	–	0	–	0	7	–	2	–	0
Lafayette	1	–	1	–	0	2	–	7	–	0
Lehigh	0	–	2	–	0	2	–	6	–	0
$ – Conference champion

The 1946 Lafayette Leopards football team was an American football team that represented Lafayette College in the Middle Three Conference during the 1946 college football season. In its seventh and final season under head coach Edward Mylin, the team compiled a 2–7 record and was outscored by a total of 286 to 56. Ed Whiteman was the team captain. The team played home games at Fisher Field in Easton, Pennsylvania.

== Schedule ==
Date	Opponent	Site	Result	Attendance	Source
September 28	Muhlenberg	Fisher Field; Easton, PA	L 20–32	8,000	
October 5	at Penn	Franklin Field; Philadelphia, PA	L 0–66	63,000	
October 12	Gettysburg	Fisher Field; Easton, PA	L 14–27	6,000	
October 19	Washington & Jefferson	Fisher Field; Easton, PA	W 7–6	4,000	
October 26	at Bucknell	Memorial Stadium; Lewisburg, PA	L 0–29	12,000	
November 2	Colgate	Fisher Field; Easton, PA	L 0–39	5,000	
November 9	at Rutgers	Rutgers Stadium; Piscataway, NJ	L 2–41	12,000	
November 16	at Columbia	Baker Field; New York, NY	L 0–46	12,000	
November 23	Lehigh	Fisher Field; Easton, PA (rivalry)	W 13–0	15,000	
