= 1946 Rutgers Queensmen football team =

American college football season

1946 Rutgers Queensmen football

Middle Three champion
- Conference: Middle Three Conference
- Record: 7–2 (2–0 Middle Three)
- Head coach: Harvey Harman (5th season)
- Home stadium: Rutgers Stadium

1946 Middle Three Conference football standings
| | Conf. | | | | | Overall |
| Team | W | | L | | T | W | | L | | T |
|---|---|---|---|---|---|---|---|---|---|---|
| Rutgers $ | 2 | – | 0 | – | 0 | 7 | – | 2 | – | 0 |
| Lafayette | 1 | – | 1 | – | 0 | 2 | – | 7 | – | 0 |
| Lehigh | 0 | – | 2 | – | 0 | 2 | – | 6 | – | 0 |
$ – Conference champion

The 1946 Rutgers Queensmen football team represented Rutgers University in the 1946 college football season. Rutgers was in its fifth non-consecutive season under head coach Harvey Harman. Harman had coached Rutgers from 1938 to 1941, but missed the 1942 to 1945 seasons while serving as a lieutenant commander in the United States Navy. The 1946 team compiled a 7–2 record, won the Middle Three Conference championship, and outscored its opponents 252 to 48. The team's only losses came against Columbia (7–13) and Princeton (7–14).

Rutgers was ranked at No. 49 in the final Litkenhous Difference by Score System rankings for 1946.

== Schedule ==
| Date | Opponent | Site | Result | Attendance | Source |
|---|---|---|---|---|---|
| September 28 | at Columbia* | Baker Field; New York, NY | L 7–13 | 23,000 | |
| October 5 | Johns Hopkins* | Rutgers Stadium; Piscataway, NJ | W 53–0 | 7,000 | |
| October 12 | at NYU* | Polo Grounds; New York, NY | W 26–0 | 10,000 | |
| October 19 | at Princeton* | Palmer Stadium; Princeton, NJ (rivalry) | L 7–14 | 45,000 | |
| October 26 | George Washington* | Rutgers Stadium; Piscataway, NJ | W 25–13 | 8,000 | |
| November 2 | at No. 17 Harvard* | Harvard Stadium; Boston, MA | W 13–0 | 12,000 | |
| November 9 | Lafayette^{†} | Rutgers Stadium; Piscataway, NJ | W 41–2 | 12,000 | |
| November 16 | at Lehigh | Taylor Stadium; Bethlehem, PA | W 55–6 | 7,000 | |
| November 23 | Bucknell* | Rutgers Stadium; Piscataway, NJ | W 25–0 | 15,000 | |
*Non-conference game; ^{†}Homecoming; Rankings from Coaches' Poll released prior to the game
