= 1946 Tampa Spartans football team =

American college football season

1946 Tampa Spartans football
- Conference: Independent
- Record: 2–4
- Head coach: Paul Straub (1st season)
- Home stadium: Phillips Field

1946 Southern non-major college football independents records
| | Conf. | | | Overall |
| Team | W | L | T | W | | L | | T |
|---|---|---|---|---|---|---|---|---|
| Oklahoma City | | – | | 10 | – | 1 | – | 0 |
| Maryville (TN) | | – | | 9 | – | 1 | – | 0 |
| East Tennessee State | | – | | 7 | – | 1 | – | 0 |
| Millsaps | | – | | 5 | – | 1 | – | 0 |
| Middle Tennessee | | – | | 6 | – | 2 | – | 1 |
| Mississippi College | | – | | 6 | – | 2 | – | 0 |
| Trinity (TX) | | – | | 6 | – | 2 | – | 0 |
| Louisville Municipal | | – | | 5 | – | 2 | – | 0 |
| Fayetteville State | | – | | 7 | – | 3 | – | 0 |
| Mississippi Southern | | – | | 7 | – | 3 | – | 0 |
| East Carolina | | – | | 5 | – | 3 | – | 1 |
| Princess Anne | | – | | 5 | – | 3 | – | 1 |
| Austin Peay | | – | | 5 | – | 4 | – | 0 |
| Arkansas State | | – | | 4 | – | 3 | – | 3 |
| Sewanee | | – | | 4 | – | 3 | – | 0 |
| Livingston State | | – | | 4 | – | 3 | – | 0 |
| Tennessee Tech | | – | | 5 | – | 5 | – | 0 |
| Troy State | | – | | 4 | – | 4 | – | 0 |
| Grambling | | – | | 5 | – | 6 | – | 0 |
| Texas A&I | | – | | 2 | – | 7 | – | 0 |
| CCUNC | | – | | 2 | – | 4 | – | 0 |
| Tampa | | – | | 2 | – | 4 | – | 0 |
| Centre | | – | | 0 | – | 7 | – | 0 |

The 1946 Tampa Spartans football team represented the University of Tampa as an independent during the 1946 college football season. Led by Paul Straub in his first season as head coach, the Spartans compiled an overall record of 2–4. The team played home games at Phillips Field in Tampa, Florida.

== Schedule ==
| Date | Opponent | Site | Result | Attendance | Source |
|---|---|---|---|---|---|
| October 12 | MacDill Air Force Base | Phillips Field; Tampa, FL | L 6–7 | 6,000 | |
| October 26 | South Georgia^{†} | Phillips Field; Tampa, FL | W 13–2 | | |
| November 7 | vs. Norman Park Junior College | Leesburg High School Stadium; Leesburg, FL | W 12–9 | 2,000 | |
| November 11 | Miami (FL) JV | Phillips Field; Tampa, FL | L 7–20 | 2,800 | |
| November 23 | at Stetson | DeLand Municipal Stadium; DeLand, FL | L 0–20 | 2,000 | |
| November 30 | vs. Livingston State | Meridian, MS | L 7–12 | | |
^{†}Homecoming
