= Lombe Honaker =

American athlete and coach (1888–1964)

Biographical details
- Born: September 25, 1888; Bland, Virginia, U.S.
- Died: September 4, 1964 (aged 75); Blount County, Tennessee, U.S.
- Education: Roanoke College

Coaching career (HC unless noted)

Football
- 1914–1916: Lincoln (IL)
- 1917–1918: Baldwin–Wallace
- 1919–1920: Southwestern (TX)
- 1921–1958: Maryville (TN)

Basketball
- 1921–1943: Maryville (TN)

Administrative career (AD unless noted)
- 1921–1943: Maryville (TN)

Head coaching record
- Overall: 173–176–24 (football)
- Bowls: 0–1

Accomplishments and honors

Championships
- Football; 2 Smoky Mountain (1930, 1931)

Lombe Scott Honaker (September 25, 1888 – September 5, 1964) was an American college football and basketball player and coach. He served as the head football coach at Lincoln College (Illinois) from 1914 to 1916, Baldwin Wallace College from 1917 to 1918, Southwestern University in Georgetown, Texas from 1919 to 1920, and Maryville College in Maryville, Tennessee from 1921 to 1958.

== Head coaching record ==
=== Football ===
Year	Team	Overall	Conference	Standing	Bowl/playoffs
Lincoln Lynx (Illinois Intercollegiate Athletic Conference) (1914–1916)
1914	Lincoln	0–5			
1915	Lincoln	2–6			
1916	Lincoln	0–2			
Lincoln:		2–13			
Baldwin–Wallace Yellow Jackets (Ohio Athletic Conference) (1917–1918)
1917	Baldwin–Wallace	1–8	0–7	T–13th	
1918	Baldwin–Wallace	5–4–1	0–4–1	12th	
Baldwin–Wallace:		6–12–1	0–11–1		
Southwestern Pirates (Texas Intercollegiate Athletic Association) (1919–1920)
1919	Southwestern	3–5–1			
1920	Southwestern	2–5–1			
Southwestern:		5–10–2			
Maryville Scots (Independent) (1921–1926)
1921	Maryville	7–1–1			
1922	Maryville	4–4–1			
1923	Maryville	7–3–1			
1924	Maryville	5–2–1			
1925	Maryville	7–2			
1926	Maryville	7–3			
Maryville Scots (Smoky Mountain Conference) (1927–1940)
1927	Maryville	6–2–1	3–0	T–1st (Note: Maryville, Emory and Henry, and Milligan all finished the year 3–0 in Smoky Mountain Conference play, but no conference title was awarded.)	
1928	Maryville	6–2–1	3–0	2nd	
1929	Maryville	5–3–1	2–1–1	3rd	
1930	Maryville	5–4	2–0	1st	
1931	Maryville	5–2–2	2–0–1	1st	
1932	Maryville	4–5	1–2	4th	
1933	Maryville	4–5–1	3–2	3rd	
1934	Maryville	4–6	2–3	7th	
1935	Maryville	4–5–1	2–2–1	5th	
1936	Maryville	5–5	4–2	3rd	
1937	Maryville	5–2–1	4–1	3rd	
1938	Maryville	4–5–1	3–3	T–3rd	
1939	Maryville	4–5–1	2–3–1	4th	
1940	Maryville	5–5	2–3	4th	
Maryville Scots (Independent) (1941–1958)
1941	Maryville	8–1			
1942	Maryville	2–6			
1943	No team—World War II				
1944	No team—World War II				
1945	No team—World War II				
1946	Maryville	9–1			L Tangerine
1947	Maryville	7–1–1			
1948	Maryville	4–4			
1949	Maryville	5–5			
1950	Maryville	0–9			
1951	Maryville	0–8			
1952	Maryville	4–4–1			
1953	Maryville	4–3–2			
1954	Maryville	4–3–2			
1955	Maryville	3–5			
1956	Maryville	3–6			
1957	Maryville	3–5–1			
1958	Maryville	0–9			
Maryville:		160–141–21	35–22–4		
Total:		173–176–24			
