= Arthur Deremer =

American football player and coach (1917–2001)

Art Deremer
No. 18
- Position: Center

Personal information
- Born: December 16, 1917; Pittsburgh, Pennsylvania, U.S.
- Died: March 14, 2001 (aged 83); Pittsburgh, Pennsylvania, U.S.
- Listed height: 6 ft 3 in (1.91 m)
- Listed weight: 208 lb (94 kg)

Career information
- High school: Westinghouse (Pittsburgh)
- College: Niagara (1939–1941)
- NFL draft: 1942: 13th round, 117th overall pick

Career history

Playing
- Brooklyn Dodgers (1942)

Coaching
- Charlotte (1946) Head coach

Career NFL statistics
- Games played: 5
- Stats at Pro Football Reference

Head coaching record
- Career: 2–4 (.333)

Arthur Martin Deremer (December 16, 1917 – March 14, 2001) was an American football player and coach. He played for one year for the Brooklyn Dodgers of the National Football League (NFL), in 1942, before becoming the head football coach at the Charlotte Center for the University of North Carolina for one season, in 1946.

== Head coaching record ==
Year	Team	Overall	Conference	Standing
CCUNC Owls (Independent) (1946)
1946	CCUNC	2–4		
CCUNC:		2–4		
Total:		2–4		
