= 1946 Mississippi Southern Southerners football team =

American college football season

1946 Mississippi Southern Southerners football

Bacardi Bowl, W 55–0 vs. University of Havana
- Conference: Independent
- Record: 7–3
- Head coach: Reed Green (7th season)
- Home stadium: Faulkner Field

1946 Southern non-major college football independents records
	Conf.			Overall
Team	W	L	T	W		L		T
Oklahoma City		–		10	–	1	–	0
Maryville (TN)		–		9	–	1	–	0
East Tennessee State		–		7	–	1	–	0
Millsaps		–		5	–	1	–	0
Middle Tennessee		–		6	–	2	–	1
Mississippi College		–		6	–	2	–	0
Trinity (TX)		–		6	–	2	–	0
Louisville Municipal		–		5	–	2	–	0
Fayetteville State		–		7	–	3	–	0
Mississippi Southern		–		7	–	3	–	0
East Carolina		–		5	–	3	–	1
Princess Anne		–		5	–	3	–	1
Austin Peay		–		5	–	4	–	0
Arkansas State		–		4	–	3	–	3
Sewanee		–		4	–	3	–	0
Livingston State		–		4	–	3	–	0
Tennessee Tech		–		5	–	5	–	0
Troy State		–		4	–	4	–	0
Grambling		–		5	–	6	–	0
Texas A&I		–		2	–	7	–	0
CCUNC		–		2	–	4	–	0
Tampa		–		2	–	4	–	0
Centre		–		0	–	7	–	0

The 1946 Mississippi Southern Southerners football team represented Mississippi Southern College (now known as the University of Southern Mississippi) in the 1946 college football season. The team played in the Bacardi Bowl against the University of Havana.

Mississippi Southern was ranked at No. 64 in the final Litkenhous Difference by Score System rankings for 1946.

== Schedule ==
Date	Opponent	Site	Result	Attendance	Source
September 21	Louisiana Tech	Faulkner Field; Hattiesburg, MS (rivalry)	W 7–6	7,000	
September 27	at Auburn	Cramton Bowl; Montgomery, AL	L 12–13	12,000	
October 4	Jacksonville State	Faulkner Field; Hattiesburg, MS	W 65–0	6,500	
October 18	Southwestern Louisiana^{†}	Faulkner Field; Hattiesburg, MS	W 6–0	8,000	
October 25	Oklahoma City	Faulkner Field; Hattiesburg, MS	W 20–6		
November 2	at Stephen F. Austin	Memorial Stadium; Nacogdoches, TX	W 7–0		
November 08	at Northwestern State	Demon Stadium; Natchitoches, LA	L 6–7	3,000	
November 15	Louisiana College	Faulkner Field; Hattiesburg, MS	W 65–0	5,000	
November 22	Southeastern Louisiana	Faulkner Field; Hattiesburg, MS	L 0–20		
December 14	at Havana University	Havana, Cuba (Bacardi Bowl)	W 55–0		
^{†}Homecoming

== After the season ==
The 1947 NFL Draft was held on December 16, 1946. The following Southerner was selected.

Round	Pick	Player	Position	NFL Club
25	234	Dick Thomas	Guard	New York Giants
