= 1946 Grambling Tigers football team =

American college football season

1946 Grambling Tigers football

Lions Bowl, W 69–12 vs. Mississippi Industrial
- Conference: Independent
- Record: 5–6
- Head coach: Eddie Robinson (4th season)

1946 Southern non-major college football independents records
| | Conf. | | | Overall |
| Team | W | L | T | W | | L | | T |
|---|---|---|---|---|---|---|---|---|
| Oklahoma City | | – | | 10 | – | 1 | – | 0 |
| Maryville (TN) | | – | | 9 | – | 1 | – | 0 |
| East Tennessee State | | – | | 7 | – | 1 | – | 0 |
| Millsaps | | – | | 5 | – | 1 | – | 0 |
| Middle Tennessee | | – | | 6 | – | 2 | – | 1 |
| Mississippi College | | – | | 6 | – | 2 | – | 0 |
| Trinity (TX) | | – | | 6 | – | 2 | – | 0 |
| Louisville Municipal | | – | | 5 | – | 2 | – | 0 |
| Fayetteville State | | – | | 7 | – | 3 | – | 0 |
| Mississippi Southern | | – | | 7 | – | 3 | – | 0 |
| East Carolina | | – | | 5 | – | 3 | – | 1 |
| Princess Anne | | – | | 5 | – | 3 | – | 1 |
| Austin Peay | | – | | 5 | – | 4 | – | 0 |
| Arkansas State | | – | | 4 | – | 3 | – | 3 |
| Sewanee | | – | | 4 | – | 3 | – | 0 |
| Livingston State | | – | | 4 | – | 3 | – | 0 |
| Tennessee Tech | | – | | 5 | – | 5 | – | 0 |
| Troy State | | – | | 4 | – | 4 | – | 0 |
| Grambling | | – | | 5 | – | 6 | – | 0 |
| Texas A&I | | – | | 2 | – | 7 | – | 0 |
| CCUNC | | – | | 2 | – | 4 | – | 0 |
| Centre | | – | | 0 | – | 7 | – | 0 |

The 1946 Grambling Tigers football team represented Grambling College—now known as Grambling State University as an independent during the 1946 college football season. In their fourth season under head coach Eddie Robinson, the Tigers compiled a 5–6 record. Grambling was invited to the Lions Bowl in Ruston, Louisiana, where the Tigers defeated Mississippi Industrial.

== Schedule ==
| Date | Time | Opponent | Site | Result | Attendance | Source |
|---|---|---|---|---|---|---|
| September 28 | | at Tuskegee | Tuskegee, AL | W 6–21 | | |
| | | Houston College | | L 8–9 | | |
| October 5 | | at Southern | Baton Rouge, LA (rivalry) | L 0–38 | | |
| October 12 | 2:30 p.m. | at Butler (TX) | Steer Stadium; Tyler, TX | W 46–0 | | |
| October 19 | | at Morgan State | Morgan Stadium; Baltimore, MD | L 0–35 | | |
| October 26 | | Bishop (TX) | Grambling, LA | W 19–7 | | |
| November 2 | | at Arkansas AM&N | Pine Bluff, AR | L 6–7 | | |
| November 16 | | Prairie View A&M^{†} | Tiger Field; Grambling, LA | L 6–16 | | |
| November 22 | | Camp Polk (LA) | Tiger Field; Grambling, LA | W 45–0 | | |
| November 28 | | Alcorn A&M | | W 42–0 | | |
| December 7 | 8:00 p.m. | vs. Mississippi Industrial | Ruston, LA (Lions Bowl) | W 69–12 | 5,000 | |
^{†}Homecoming; All times are in Central time
