= 1946 Texas A&I Javelinas football team =

American college football season

1946 Texas A&I Javelinas football
- Conference: Independent
- Record: 2–7
- Head coach: Dewey Mayhew (1st season)
- Captains: J. W. Helms; Bob Stevens

1946 Southern non-major college football independents records
	Conf.			Overall
Team	W	L	T	W		L		T
Oklahoma City		–		10	–	1	–	0
Maryville (TN)		–		9	–	1	–	0
East Tennessee State		–		7	–	1	–	0
Millsaps		–		5	–	1	–	0
Middle Tennessee		–		6	–	2	–	1
Mississippi College		–		6	–	2	–	0
Trinity (TX)		–		6	–	2	–	0
Louisville Municipal		–		5	–	2	–	0
Fayetteville State		–		7	–	3	–	0
Mississippi Southern		–		7	–	3	–	0
East Carolina		–		5	–	3	–	1
Princess Anne		–		5	–	3	–	1
Austin Peay		–		5	–	4	–	0
Arkansas State		–		4	–	3	–	3
Sewanee		–		4	–	3	–	0
Livingston State		–		4	–	3	–	0
Tennessee Tech		–		5	–	5	–	0
Troy State		–		4	–	4	–	0
Grambling		–		5	–	6	–	0
Texas A&I		–		2	–	7	–	0
CCUNC		–		2	–	4	–	0
Centre		–		0	–	7	–	0

The 1946 Texas A&I Javelinas football team was an American football team that represented the Texas College of Arts and Industries (now known as Texas A&M University–Kingsville) as an independent during the 1946 college football season. In their first season under head coach Dewey Mayhew, the Javelinas compiled a 2–7 record and were outscored by a total of 201 to 52.

== Schedule ==
Date	Opponent	Site	Result	Source
September 21	at Howard Payne	Brownwood, TX	L 0–27	
September 28	at Sam Houston State	Pritchett Field; Huntsville, TX	L 0–20	
October 5	Southwest Texas State	Kingsville, TX	L 0–28	
October 12	at Houston	Public School Stadium; Houston, TX	L 0–34	
October 19	McMurry (TX)	Kingsville, TX	L 10–13	
October 26	at Corpus Christi NAS	Buccaneer Stadium; Corpus Christi, TX	L 0–20	
November 2	Sul Ross	Kingville, TX	W 12–7	
November 16	at Stephen F. Austin	Nacogdoches, TX	W 23–20	
November 23	Abilene Christian	Kingsville, TX	L 7–32	
