= 1946 Badger State Conference football season =

- Sport: Football
- Number of teams: 5
- Champion: Northwestern College

Football seasons
- ← 1945 1947 →

1946 Badger State Conference football standings
	Conf.					Overall
Team	W		L		T	W		L		T
Northwestern (WI) $	2	–	0	–	1	3	–	2	–	1
Wisconsin Tech	2	–	1	–	0	2	–	1	–	0
Mission House	2	–	2	–	0	3	–	3	–	0
Milton	1	–	2	–	1	1	–	4	–	1
Wisconsin–Extension	1	–	3	–	0	1	–	4	–	1
$ – Conference champion

The 1946 Badger State Conference football season was the season of college football played by the member schools of the Badger State Conference (BSC) as part of the 1946 college football season. Northwestern College of Watertown, Wisconsin, led by head coach Leonard J. Umnus, compiled a 3–2–1 record and won the BSC championship.

== Conference overview ==
Conf. Rank	Team	Head coach	Conf. record	Overall record	Points scored	Points against
1	Northwestern College	Leonard J. Umnus	2–0–1	3–2–1	57	44
2	Wisconsin Tech	George R. Dobson	2–1	2–1	33	13
3	Mission House	Marinus Kregel	2–2	3–3	58	44
4	Milton	Elmer R. Fenton	1–2–1	1–4–1	28	65
5	University of Wisconsin–Extension	Traskell	1–3	1–4–1	36	72

== Teams ==
=== Northwestern College ===
The 1946 Northwestern College football team represented Northwestern College in the Badger State Conference (BSC) during the 1946 college football season. Led by head coach Leonard J. Umnus, Northwestern compiled a 3–2–1 record (2–0–1 against BSC opponents), won the BSC championship, and outscored opponents by a total of 57 to 44.

Date	Opponent	Site	Result	Source
October 5	Mission House		W 13–0	
October 12	at Beloit*	Beloit, WI	L 0–12	
October 26	Wisconsin Extension		W 20–12	
November 1	Milton	Watertown, WI	T 0–0	
	Aurora*		L 12–20	
November 9	Concordia (IL)*^{†}	Watertown, WI	W 12–0	
*Non-conference game; ^{†}Homecoming

=== Wisconsin Tech ===
The 1946 Wisconsin Tech football team represented the Wisconsin Institute of Technology in the Badger State Conference (BSC) during the 1946 college football season. Led by head coach George R. Dobson, Wisconsin Tech compiled a 2–1 record, finished second in the BSC, and outscored opponents by a total of 33 to 13.

Date	Opponent	Site	Result	Source
October 5	Milton	Monterey Stadium; Janesville, WI	W 26–7	
October 19	Mission House		L 0–6	
November 2	Wisconsin Extension		W 7–0	

=== Mission House ===
The 1946 Mission House Muskies football team represented Mission House College in the Badger State Conference (BSC) during the 1946 college football season. Led by head coach Marinus Kregel, Mission House compiled a 3–3 record, finished third in the BSC, and outscored opponents by a total of 58 to 44.

Date	Opponent	Site	Result	Source
October 5	Northwestern College		L 0–13	
October 12	Wisconsin Extension	Plymouth, WI	L 0–6	
October 18	Wisconsin Tech	Plymouth, WI	W 6–0	
October 24	vs. Milton	Memorial Athletic Park; Sheboygan, WI	W 13–7	
	Aurora*		L 7–12	
	Wisconsin Extension		W 32–6	
*Non-conference game

=== Milton ===
The 1946 Milton Wildcats football team represented Milton College in the Badger State Conference (BSC) during the 1946 college football season. Led by head coach Elmer R. Fenton, Milton compiled a 1–4–1 record, finished fourth in the BSC, and was outscored by a total of 65 to 28.

Date	Opponent	Site	Result	Source
October 5	Wisconsin Tech	Monterey Stadium; Janesville, WI	L 7–26	
October 12	at Ferris Institute*	Big Rapids, MI	L 7–13	
October 19	Wisconsin Extension (Milwaukee)	Milton, WI	W 7–6	
October 24	vs. Mission House	Memorial Athletic Park; Sheboygan, WI	L 7–13	
November 1	at Northwestern (WI)	Watertown, WI	T 0–0	
November 9	Aurora*^{†}	Milton, WI	L 0–7	
*Non-conference game; ^{†}Homecoming

=== Wisconsin Extension ===
The 1946 Wisconsin Extension football team represented the University of Wisconsin–Extension of Milwaukee in the Badger State Conference (BSC) during the 1946 college football season. Led by head coach Traskell, the team compiled a 1–4–1 record, finished last in the BSC, and was outscored by a total of 72 to 36.

Date	Opponent	Site	Result	Source
	Ferris Institute*		T 6–6	
October 12	Mission House	Plymouth, WI	W 6–0	
	Milton		L 6–7	
	Northwestern College		L 12–20	
	Wisconsin Tech		L 0–7	
	Mission House		L 6–32	
*Non-conference game
