= 1946 East Carolina Pirates football team =

American college football season

1946 East Carolina Pirates football
- Conference: Independent
- Record: 5–3–1
- Head coach: Jim Johnson (1st season)
- Home stadium: Guy Smith Stadium

1946 Southern non-major college football independents records
	Conf.			Overall
Team	W	L	T	W		L		T
Oklahoma City		–		10	–	1	–	0
Maryville (TN)		–		9	–	1	–	0
East Tennessee State		–		7	–	1	–	0
Millsaps		–		5	–	1	–	0
Middle Tennessee		–		6	–	2	–	1
Mississippi College		–		6	–	2	–	0
Trinity (TX)		–		6	–	2	–	0
Louisville Municipal		–		5	–	2	–	0
Fayetteville State		–		7	–	3	–	0
Mississippi Southern		–		7	–	3	–	0
East Carolina		–		5	–	3	–	1
Princess Anne		–		5	–	3	–	1
Austin Peay		–		5	–	4	–	0
Arkansas State		–		4	–	3	–	3
Sewanee		–		4	–	3	–	0
Livingston State		–		4	–	3	–	0
Tennessee Tech		–		5	–	5	–	0
Troy State		–		4	–	4	–	0
Grambling		–		5	–	6	–	0
Texas A&I		–		2	–	7	–	0
CCUNC		–		2	–	4	–	0
Centre		–		0	–	7	–	0

The 1946 East Carolina Pirates football team was an American football team that represented East Carolina Teachers College (now known as East Carolina University) as an independent during the 1946 college football season. In their first season under head coach Jim Johnson, the team compiled a 5–3–1 record.

== Schedule ==
Date	Opponent	Site	Result	Source
September 27	Presbyterian Junior College	Guy Smith Stadium; Greenville, NC	W 20–0	
October 5	Atlantic Christian	Guy Smith Stadium; Greenville, NC	T 6–6	
October 12	at Elon	Kiker Stadium; Reidsville, NC	L 6–13	
October 19	Erskine	Guy Smith Stadium; Greenville, NC	W 21–7	
October 26	at The Apprentice School	Apprentice Field; Newport News, VA	W 19–6	
November 9	at Atlantic Christian	Wilson, NC	W 26–6	
November 16	Western Carolina	Guy Smith Stadium; Greenville, NC	L 7–13	
November 22	at Lenoir–Rhyne	Moretz Stadium; Hickory, NC	L 0–6	
November 28	at Fort Bragg	Fayetteville, NC	W 53–0	
