= 1946 Maryville Scots football team =

American college football season

1946 Maryville Scots football

Tangerine Bowl, L 6–31 vs. Catawba
- Conference: Independent
- Record: 9–1
- Head coach: Lombe Honaker (23rd season)

1946 Southern non-major college football independents records
	Conf.			Overall
Team	W	L	T	W		L		T
Oklahoma City		–		10	–	1	–	0
Maryville (TN)		–		9	–	1	–	0
East Tennessee State		–		7	–	1	–	0
Millsaps		–		5	–	1	–	0
Middle Tennessee		–		6	–	2	–	1
Mississippi College		–		6	–	2	–	0
Trinity (TX)		–		6	–	2	–	0
Louisville Municipal		–		5	–	2	–	0
Fayetteville State		–		7	–	3	–	0
Mississippi Southern		–		7	–	3	–	0
East Carolina		–		5	–	3	–	1
Princess Anne		–		5	–	3	–	1
Austin Peay		–		5	–	4	–	0
Arkansas State		–		4	–	3	–	3
Sewanee		–		4	–	3	–	0
Livingston State		–		4	–	3	–	0
Tennessee Tech		–		5	–	5	–	0
Troy State		–		4	–	4	–	0
Grambling		–		5	–	6	–	0
Texas A&I		–		2	–	7	–	0
CCUNC		–		2	–	4	–	0
Centre		–		0	–	7	–	0

The 1946 Maryville Scots football team represented the Maryville College during the 1946 college football season. Under 23rd-year head coach Lombe Honaker, the Scots compiled a 9–1, went undefeated in the regular season for the first and only time in program history, shut out five of their ten opponents, and kept all but one from scoring more than 7 points, and outscored their opponents by a total of 217 to 52. They were invited to the first annual Tangerine Bowl, where they lost to Catawba, 31–6, on New Year's Day.

== Schedule ==
Date	Opponent	Site	Result	Attendance
September 21	Hiwassee	Maryville, TN	W 33–0	
September 28	Tennessee Wesleyan	Maryville, TN	W 14–0	
October 5	Centre	Maryville, TN	W 19–0	
October 19	East Tennessee State	Johnson City, TN	W 25–2	
October 26	Emory and Henry	Emory, VA	W 19–6	
November 1	Middle Tennessee	Maryville, TN	W 20–6	
November 9	Sewanee	Sewanee, TN	W 7–0	
November 16	Carson–Newman	Jefferson City, TN	W 33–7	
November 22	Tusculum	Maryville, TN	W 41–0	
January 1, 1947	Catawba	Orlando Stadium; Orlando, FL (Tangerine Bowl)	L 6–31	9,000
