= 1946 Oklahoma City Chiefs football team =

American college football season

1946 Oklahoma City Chiefs football
- Conference: Independent
- Record: 10–1
- Head coach: Bo Rowland (1st season)
- Home stadium: Taft Stadium

1946 Southern non-major college football independents records
	Conf.			Overall
Team	W	L	T	W		L		T
Oklahoma City		–		10	–	1	–	0
Maryville (TN)		–		9	–	1	–	0
East Tennessee State		–		7	–	1	–	0
Millsaps		–		5	–	1	–	0
Middle Tennessee		–		6	–	2	–	1
Mississippi College		–		6	–	2	–	0
Trinity (TX)		–		6	–	2	–	0
Louisville Municipal		–		5	–	2	–	0
Fayetteville State		–		7	–	3	–	0
Mississippi Southern		–		7	–	3	–	0
East Carolina		–		5	–	3	–	1
Princess Anne		–		5	–	3	–	1
Austin Peay		–		5	–	4	–	0
Arkansas State		–		4	–	3	–	3
Sewanee		–		4	–	3	–	0
Livingston State		–		4	–	3	–	0
Tennessee Tech		–		5	–	5	–	0
Troy State		–		4	–	4	–	0
Grambling		–		5	–	6	–	0
Texas A&I		–		2	–	7	–	0
CCUNC		–		2	–	4	–	0
Centre		–		0	–	7	–	0

The 1946 Oklahoma City Chiefs football team represented Oklahoma City University as an independent during the 1946 college football season. Led by Bo Rowland in his first as head coach, the team compiled a record of 10–1. Oklahoma City was ranked second nationally among small-college teams with an average of 392.7 yards per game in total offense. The Chiefs also ranked sixth nationally in total defense, giving up an average of only 121.5 yards per game. Oklahoma City was ranked at No. 31 among all college programs in the final Litkenhous Difference by Score System rankings.

Andy Victor was the nation's second leading scorer during the 1946 season with 124 points scored on 14 touchdowns and 40 extra points.

== Schedule ==
Date	Opponent	Site	Result	Attendance	Source
September 13	at Air Transport Command	Crump Stadium; Memphis, TN	W 27–0	7,200	
September 20	Henderson State	Taft Stadium; Oklahoma City, OK	W 58–0		
September 28	Southwestern (TX)	Taft Stadium; Oklahoma City, OK	W 53–0		
October 5	Missouri Mines	Taft Stadium; Oklahoma City, OK	W 74–6	4,000	
October 12	Fresno State	Taft Stadium; Oklahoma City, OK	W 46–7		
October 19	at Wichita	Veterans Field; Wichita, KS	W 28–0		
October 25	at Mississippi Southern	Faulkner Field; Hattiesburg, MS	L 6–20		
November 2	South Dakota State	Taft Stadium; Oklahoma City, OK	W W 35–0	4,000	
November 16	at Louisiana Tech	Tech Stadium; Ruston, LA	W 6–2		
November 23	Bethany (KS)	Taft Stadium; Oklahoma City, OK	W 61–6		
November 28	Dakota Wesleyan	Taft Stadium; Oklahoma City, OK	W 76–6	5,000	

== After the season ==
The 1947 NFL draft was held on December 16, 1946. The following Chiefs were selected.

Round	Pick	Player	Position	NFL club
9	74	John Novitsky	Tackle	New York Giants
15	135	Wayne Goodall	End	Chicago Bears
17	147	Marion Shirley	Tackle	Boston Yanks
