= 1946 Trinity Tigers football team =

American football team that represented Trinity University

1946 Trinity Tigers football
- Conference: Independent
- Record: 6–2
- Head coach: Bob Coe (1st season)
- Home stadium: Alamo Stadium

1946 Southern non-major college football independents records
	Conf.			Overall
Team	W	L	T	W		L		T
Oklahoma City		–		10	–	1	–	0
Maryville (TN)		–		9	–	1	–	0
East Tennessee State		–		7	–	1	–	0
Millsaps		–		5	–	1	–	0
Middle Tennessee		–		6	–	2	–	1
Mississippi College		–		6	–	2	–	0
Trinity (TX)		–		6	–	2	–	0
Louisville Municipal		–		5	–	2	–	0
Fayetteville State		–		7	–	3	–	0
Mississippi Southern		–		7	–	3	–	0
East Carolina		–		5	–	3	–	1
Princess Anne		–		5	–	3	–	1
Austin Peay		–		5	–	4	–	0
Arkansas State		–		4	–	3	–	3
Sewanee		–		4	–	3	–	0
Livingston State		–		4	–	3	–	0
Tennessee Tech		–		5	–	5	–	0
Troy State		–		4	–	4	–	0
Grambling		–		5	–	6	–	0
Texas A&I		–		2	–	7	–	0
CCUNC		–		2	–	4	–	0
Centre		–		0	–	7	–	0

The 1946 Trinity Tigers football team was an American football team that represented Trinity University of Texas as an independent during the 1946 college football season. In their first season under head coach Bob Coe, the team compiled a 6–2 record, shut out four of eight opponents, and outscored all opponents by a total of 305 to 47.

Trinity ranked third nationally in total offense among small-college teams with an average of 387.0 yards per game. It also ranked second in total defense, giving up only 100.8 yards per game.

The season was the first for the football team after the school's move from Waxahachie to San Antonio. It also marked a transition for Trinity as it prepared to join the Lone Star Conference during the 1947 season. The 1946 season consisted of games primarily with Army teams from in and around San Antonio and was billed by the school as "the start of bigger things to come for San Antonio sport fans."

The team did not yet have a football stadium on its San Antonio campus and played its home games at Alamo Stadium and Harlandale High School field, both in San Antonio.

== Schedule ==
Date	Opponent	Site	Result	Attendance	Source
September 21	Fourth Army	San Antonio, TX	W 26–7		
September 30	Randolph Field	Harlandale High School Field; San Antonio, TX	L 6–7		
October 7	San Marcos Army Air Field	Alamo Stadium; San Antonio, TX	W 92–0		
October 14	Fourth Army	Alamo Stadium; San Antonio, TX	W 54–0		
October 21	War Department Personnel Center, Fort Sam Houston	Alamo Stadium; San Antonio, TX	W 67–0	1,011	
October 28	Randolph Field^{†}	Alamo Stadium; San Antonio, TX	W 19–6		
November 2	Somerset Veterans	Harlandale Field; San Antonio, TX	W 27–0		
November 16	at Corpus Christi NAS	Buccaneer Stadium; Corpus Christi, TX	L 14–27	1,500	
^{†}Homecoming

== Players ==
- Clay Browne, center, 180 pounds
- Ernest Denham, end, 190 pounds
- Robert Erfurth, halfback, 155 pounds
- Daniel Forbes, tackle, 190 pounds
- H. Hieronymous, quarterback, 170 pounds
- Gerald Keller, fullback, 181 pounds
- John Mack, tackle, 210 pounds
- Ike Meador, end, 195 pounds
- Henry Perry, halfback, 155 pounds
- Jerry Simmang, guard, 185 pounds
- Norman Theis, guard, 170 pounds
