= 1946 Arkansas State Indians football team =

American college football season

1946 Arkansas State Indians football
- Conference: Independent
- Record: 4–3–3
- Head coach: Forrest England (1st season)
- Home stadium: Kays Stadium

1946 Southern non-major college football independents records
	Conf.			Overall
Team	W	L	T	W		L		T
Oklahoma City		–		10	–	1	–	0
Maryville (TN)		–		9	–	1	–	0
East Tennessee State		–		7	–	1	–	0
Millsaps		–		5	–	1	–	0
Middle Tennessee		–		6	–	2	–	1
Mississippi College		–		6	–	2	–	0
Trinity (TX)		–		6	–	2	–	0
Louisville Municipal		–		5	–	2	–	0
Fayetteville State		–		7	–	3	–	0
Mississippi Southern		–		7	–	3	–	0
East Carolina		–		5	–	3	–	1
Princess Anne		–		5	–	3	–	1
Austin Peay		–		5	–	4	–	0
Arkansas State		–		4	–	3	–	3
Sewanee		–		4	–	3	–	0
Livingston State		–		4	–	3	–	0
Tennessee Tech		–		5	–	5	–	0
Troy State		–		4	–	4	–	0
Grambling		–		5	–	6	–	0
Texas A&I		–		2	–	7	–	0
CCUNC		–		2	–	4	–	0
Centre		–		0	–	7	–	0

The 1946 Arkansas State Indians football team was an American football team that represented Arkansas State College—now known as Arkansas State University—as an independent during the 1946 college football season. In their first year under head coach Forrest England, the Indians compiled a 4–3–3 record and were outscored by a total of 103 to 99.

== Schedule ==
Date	Opponent	Site	Result	Source
September 27	at Southeast Missouri State	Houck Stadium; Cape Girardeau, MO	L 0–8	
October 5	at Bradley	Peoria Stadium; Peoria, IL	L 2–26	
October 12	at Monticello A&M	Monticello, AR	T 13–13	
October 19	at Southern Illinois	McAndrew Stadium; Carbondale, IL	W 14–12	
October 26	at Xavier	Xavier Stadium; Cincinnati, OH	L 0–26	
November 2	Illinois Wesleyan	Kays Stadium; Jonesboro, AR	W 20–0	
November 9	Henderson State	Kays Stadium; Jonesboro, AR	T 0–0	
November 16	at Evansville	Bosse Field; Evansville, IN	T 6–6	
November 23	at Centre	Farris Stadium; Danville, KY	W 14–0	
November 28	at Arkansas State Teachers	Estes Stadium; Conway, AR	W 30–12	
