= 1946 Fayetteville State Broncos football team =

American college football season

1946 Fayetteville State Broncos football

Piedmont Tobacco Bowl, L 6–40 vs. Allen
- Conference: Independent
- Record: 7–3
- Head coach: William A. Gaines (2nd season)

1946 Southern non-major college football independents records
	Conf.			Overall
Team	W	L	T	W		L		T
Oklahoma City		–		10	–	1	–	0
Maryville (TN)		–		9	–	1	–	0
East Tennessee State		–		7	–	1	–	0
Millsaps		–		5	–	1	–	0
Middle Tennessee		–		6	–	2	–	1
Mississippi College		–		6	–	2	–	0
Trinity (TX)		–		6	–	2	–	0
Louisville Municipal		–		5	–	2	–	0
Fayetteville State		–		7	–	3	–	0
Mississippi Southern		–		7	–	3	–	0
East Carolina		–		5	–	3	–	1
Princess Anne		–		5	–	3	–	1
Austin Peay		–		5	–	4	–	0
Arkansas State		–		4	–	3	–	3
Sewanee		–		4	–	3	–	0
Livingston State		–		4	–	3	–	0
Tennessee Tech		–		5	–	5	–	0
Troy State		–		4	–	4	–	0
Grambling		–		5	–	6	–	0
Texas A&I		–		2	–	7	–	0
CCUNC		–		2	–	4	–	0
Centre		–		0	–	7	–	0

The 1946 Fayetteville State Broncos football team was an American football team that represented Fayetteville State Teachers College (now known as Fayetteville State University) as an independent during the 1946 college football season. In its second season under head coach William A. Gaines, the team compiled a 7–3 record, lost to Allen in the Piedmont Tobacco Bowl, and outscored all opponents by a total of 110 to 102.

== Schedule ==
Date	Opponent	Site	Result	Attendance	Source
September 28	at Shaw	Chavis Park; Raleigh, NC	L 0–25	2,500	
October 12	at Livingstone	Salisbury, NC	W 6–0		
October 19	Saint Paul's (VA)	Fayetteville, NC	W 14–0		
November 9	St. Augustine's		W 6–0		
	Princess Anne		W 20–6		
	Norfolk State		W 13–0		
	Elizabeth City State		L 7–25		
November 23	at Cheyney	West Chester, PA	W 14–6		
	Livingstone		W 24–0		
December 7	Allen	Cumberland Stadium; Fayetteville, NC (Piedmont Tobacco Bowl)	L 6–40		
