= 1946 Louisville Municipal Bantams football team =

American college football season

1946 Louisville Municipal Bantams football

Vulcan Bowl, L 0–32 vs. Tennessee A&I
- Conference: Independent
- Record: 5–2
- Head coach: Dwight T. Reed (1st season)

1946 Southern non-major college football independents records
	Conf.			Overall
Team	W	L	T	W		L		T
Oklahoma City		–		10	–	1	–	0
Maryville (TN)		–		9	–	1	–	0
East Tennessee State		–		7	–	1	–	0
Millsaps		–		5	–	1	–	0
Middle Tennessee		–		6	–	2	–	1
Mississippi College		–		6	–	2	–	0
Trinity (TX)		–		6	–	2	–	0
Louisville Municipal		–		5	–	2	–	0
Fayetteville State		–		7	–	3	–	0
Mississippi Southern		–		7	–	3	–	0
East Carolina		–		5	–	3	–	1
Princess Anne		–		5	–	3	–	1
Austin Peay		–		5	–	4	–	0
Arkansas State		–		4	–	3	–	3
Sewanee		–		4	–	3	–	0
Livingston State		–		4	–	3	–	0
Tennessee Tech		–		5	–	5	–	0
Troy State		–		4	–	4	–	0
Grambling		–		5	–	6	–	0
Texas A&I		–		2	–	7	–	0
CCUNC		–		2	–	4	–	0
Centre		–		0	–	7	–	0

The 1946 Louisville Municipal Bantams football team was an American football team that represented Louisville Municipal College (now part of University of Louisville) as an independent during the 1946 college football season. In their first season under head coach Dwight T. Reed, the Bantams compiled a 5–2 record, lost to Tennessee A&I in the Vulcan Bowl, and outscored all opponents by a total of 116 to 63.

In December 1946, The Pittsburgh Courier applied the Dickinson System to the black college teams and rated Louisville Municipal at No. 16.

The team played its home games at Maxwell Field in Louisville, Kentucky.

== Schedule ==
Date	Opponent	Rank	Site	Result	Attendance	Source
October 5	at Lincoln (MO)		Lincoln Field; Jefferson City, MO	L 6–12		
October 12	Fort Knox		Central High School Stadium; Louisville, KY	W 27–0	1,500	
October 19	Morristown		Louisville, KY	W 13–7		
November 2	Lockbourne Army Air Base		Maxwell Field; Louisville, KY	W 39–0		
November 9	Miles		Maxwell Field; Louisville, KY	W 25–12		
November 23	Fisk^{†}		Maxwell Field; Louisville, KY	W 6–0		
January 1, 1947	vs. No. 1 Tennessee A&I	No. 16	Birmingham, AL (Vulcan Bowl)	L 0–32	4,000	
^{†}Homecoming; Rankings from Pittsburgh Courier Dickinson System
