= 1946 Jacksonville State Eagle Owls football team =

American college football season

1946 Jacksonville State Eagle Owls football
- Conference: Alabama Intercollegiate Conference
- Record: 3–5–1 (1–1–1 AIC)
- Head coach: Don Salls (1st season)
- Home stadium: College Field

1946 Alabama Intercollegiate Conference football standings
	Conf.					Overall
Team	W		L		T	W		L		T
Livingston State $	2	–	0	–	0	5	–	2	–	0
Troy State	3	–	1	–	0	3	–	4	–	0
Jacksonville State	1	–	1	–	1	3	–	5	–	1
Marion	1	–	2	–	0	2	–	2	–	0
St. Bernard	0	–	3	–	1	1	–	6	–	1
$ – Conference champion

The 1946 Jacksonville State Eagle Owls football team represented Jacksonville State Teachers College (now known as Jacksonville State University) as a member of the Alabama Intercollegiate Conference (AIC) during the 1946 college football season. Led by first-year head coach Don Salls, the Gamecocks compiled an overall record of 3–5–1 with a mark of 1–1–1 in conference play.

== Schedule ==
Date	Opponent	Site	Result	Attendance	Source
September 26	at Middle Tennessee*	Horace Jones Field; Murfreesboro, TN	L 0–21	3,000	
October 4	at Mississippi Southern*	Faulkner Field; Hattiesburg, MS	L 0–65	6,500	
October 11	at Middle Georgia*	Cochran, GA	W 26–0		
October 17	Troy State	Memorial Stadium; Anniston, AL (rivalry)	L 0–12	2,500	
October 25	St. Bernard	College Field; Jacksonville, AL	T 0–0		
November 2	at Western Carolina*	Cullowhee, NC	L 0–13		
November 8	Marion	College Field; Jacksonville, AL	W 13–7		
November 15	at Southeastern Louisiana*	Strawberry Stadium; Hammond, LA	L 0–39		
November 23	at West Georgia*	Carrollton, GA	W 33–0		
*Non-conference game
