= 1946 East Tennessee State Buccaneers football team =

American college football season

1946 East Tennessee State Buccaneers football
- Conference: Independent
- Record: 7–1
- Head coach: Gene McMurray (11th season)
- Captain: Bob Tranburger

1946 Southern non-major college football independents records
	Conf.			Overall
Team	W	L	T	W		L		T
Oklahoma City		–		10	–	1	–	0
Maryville (TN)		–		9	–	1	–	0
East Tennessee State		–		7	–	1	–	0
Millsaps		–		5	–	1	–	0
Middle Tennessee		–		6	–	2	–	1
Mississippi College		–		6	–	2	–	0
Trinity (TX)		–		6	–	2	–	0
Louisville Municipal		–		5	–	2	–	0
Fayetteville State		–		7	–	3	–	0
Mississippi Southern		–		7	–	3	–	0
East Carolina		–		5	–	3	–	1
Princess Anne		–		5	–	3	–	1
Austin Peay		–		5	–	4	–	0
Arkansas State		–		4	–	3	–	3
Sewanee		–		4	–	3	–	0
Livingston State		–		4	–	3	–	0
Tennessee Tech		–		5	–	5	–	0
Troy State		–		4	–	4	–	0
Grambling		–		5	–	6	–	0
Texas A&I		–		2	–	7	–	0
CCUNC		–		2	–	4	–	0
Centre		–		0	–	7	–	0

The 1946 East Tennessee State Buccaneers football team was an American football team that represented East Tennessee State College (ETSC)—now known as East Tennessee State University—as an independent during the 1946 college football season. In their eleventh, non-consecutive year under head coach Gene McMurray, the team compiled a 7–1 record and outscored opponents by a total of 125 to 56. It would be McMurray's last year as head coach, as he would take over the Physical Education Department at University of Mississippi in 1947. The win total from this season would not be equaled for 16 years and was a high-water mark for the program. The team would be dubbed "The Barefoot Boys" because half of the 70 members trying out for the team had no shoes due to poor funding and being ill-equipped. It took until only three days prior to the game against Brevard that enough shoes had been acquired to outfit the entire team.

== Schedule ==
Date	Opponent	Site	Result	Attendance	Source
September 21	Brevard	Johnson City, TN	W 32–0		
September 28	at Tusculum	Greenville, TN	W 14–0	1,000	
October 5	at Georgetown (KY)	Georgetown, KY	W 13–6		
October 12	at Emory & Henry	Emory, VA	W 6–0		
October 19	Maryville (TN)	Johnson City, TN	L 2–25		
October 26	at Carson-Newman	Jefferson City, TN	W 6–0		
November 2	Cumberland	Johnson City, TN	W 34–6		
November 9	vs. Emory & Henry	Pulaski, VA	W 19–12	2,500	
