= 1946 CCUNC Owls football team =

American college football season

1946 CCUNC Owls football
- Conference: Independent
- Record: 2–4
- Head coach: Arthur Deremer (1st season)
- Home stadium: American Legion Memorial Stadium

1946 Southern non-major college football independents records
	Conf.			Overall
Team	W	L	T	W		L		T
Oklahoma City		–		10	–	1	–	0
Maryville (TN)		–		9	–	1	–	0
East Tennessee State		–		7	–	1	–	0
Millsaps		–		5	–	1	–	0
Middle Tennessee		–		6	–	2	–	1
Mississippi College		–		6	–	2	–	0
Trinity (TX)		–		6	–	2	–	0
Louisville Municipal		–		5	–	2	–	0
Fayetteville State		–		7	–	3	–	0
Mississippi Southern		–		7	–	3	–	0
East Carolina		–		5	–	3	–	1
Princess Anne		–		5	–	3	–	1
Austin Peay		–		5	–	4	–	0
Arkansas State		–		4	–	3	–	3
Sewanee		–		4	–	3	–	0
Livingston State		–		4	–	3	–	0
Tennessee Tech		–		5	–	5	–	0
Troy State		–		4	–	4	–	0
Grambling		–		5	–	6	–	0
Texas A&I		–		2	–	7	–	0
CCUNC		–		2	–	4	–	0
Centre		–		0	–	7	–	0

The 1946 CCUNC Owls football team was an American football team that represented the Charlotte Center of the University of North Carolina or CCUNC (now known as the University of North Carolina at Charlotte) as an independent during the 1946 college football season. In their first season under head coach Arthur Deremer, the team compiled a 2–4 record. The Owls moniker was chosen by the players from the inaugural squad.

== Schedule ==
Date	Opponent	Site	Result	Source
October 12	at 505th Infantry	Fayetteville, NC	L 0–26	
October 15	Catawba JV	American Legion Memorial Stadium; Charlotte, NC	L 14–25	
October 19	Clemson JV	American Legion Memorial Stadium; Charlotte, NC	L 0–73	
November 5	at Pembroke State	Pembroke, NC	W 12–0	
November 15	at Davidson JV	Richardson Stadium; Davidson, NC	L 20–26	
November 20	at Belmont Abbey	Gastonia H.S. Stadium; Gastonia, NC	W 6–0	
