= Steer Stadium =

Baseball park in Graham, Texas, US

Coordinates: 33.11872°N 98.55373°W

Steer Stadium is a baseball park located in Graham, Texas; it is the home of the UIL Graham High School Steers baseball team. The facility was also the home of the TCL Graham Roughnecks from 2004 to 2006 before relocating to Wichita Falls, Texas. It was also the site of the first Texas Collegiate League All-Star game on July 12, 2004. The Tris Speaker Division defeated the Roger Hornsby Division by a score of 7–3.
