= 1946 Middle Tennessee Blue Raiders football team =

American college football season

1946 Middle Tennessee Blue Raiders football
- Conference: Independent
- Record: 6–2–1
- Head coach: Elwin W. Midgett (4th season)
- Captains: G. McIntyre; Bob Burkett
- Home stadium: Horace Jones Field

1946 Southern non-major college football independents records
	Conf.			Overall
Team	W	L	T	W		L		T
Oklahoma City		–		10	–	1	–	0
Maryville (TN)		–		9	–	1	–	0
East Tennessee State		–		7	–	1	–	0
Millsaps		–		5	–	1	–	0
Middle Tennessee		–		6	–	2	–	1
Mississippi College		–		6	–	2	–	0
Trinity (TX)		–		6	–	2	–	0
Louisville Municipal		–		5	–	2	–	0
Fayetteville State		–		7	–	3	–	0
Mississippi Southern		–		7	–	3	–	0
East Carolina		–		5	–	3	–	1
Princess Anne		–		5	–	3	–	1
Austin Peay		–		5	–	4	–	0
Arkansas State		–		4	–	3	–	3
Sewanee		–		4	–	3	–	0
Livingston State		–		4	–	3	–	0
Tennessee Tech		–		5	–	5	–	0
Troy State		–		4	–	4	–	0
Grambling		–		5	–	6	–	0
Texas A&I		–		2	–	7	–	0
CCUNC		–		2	–	4	–	0
Centre		–		0	–	7	–	0

The 1946 Middle Tennessee Blue Raiders football team represented the Middle Tennessee State College—now known as Middle Tennessee State University—as an independent during the 1946 college football season. Led by Elwin W. Midgett in his fourth season as head coach, the Blue Raiders compiled a record of 6–2–1. The team's captains were G. McIntyre and Bob Burkett.

== Schedule ==
Date	Opponent	Site	Result	Attendance	Source
September 26	Jacksonville State	Horace Jones Field; Murfreesboro, TN	W 21–0	3,000	
October 3	Milligan	Horace Jones Field; Murfreesboro, TN	T 0–0		
October 11	at Union (TN)	Jackson, TN	W 14–7		
October 17	at Austin Peay	Clarksville Municipal Stadium; Clarksville, TN	W 42–9		
October 24	Cumberland (TN)	Horace Jones Field; Murfreesboro, TN	W 28–0		
November 2	Maryville (TN)	Horace Jones Field; Murfreesboro, TN	L 6–20		
November 9	at Centre	Farris Stadium; Danville, KY	W 19–18		
November 15	Troy State^{†}	Horace Jones Field; Murfreesboro, TN (rivalry)	W 12–0	2,000	
November 28	at Tennessee Tech	Overhill Field; Cookeville, TN	L 7–21		
^{†}Homecoming
