= 1946 college football season =

American college football season

- First AP No. 1 of season: Texas
- Number of bowls: 12
- Champion(s): Notre Dame (AP); Army (various); Delaware (small college)
- Heisman: Glenn Davis (halfback, Army)

The 1946 college football season was the 78th season of intercollegiate football in the United States. Competition included schools from the Big Ten Conference, the Pacific Coast Conference (PCC), the Southeastern Conference (SEC), the Big Six Conference, the Southern Conference, the Southwestern Conference, and numerous smaller conferences and independent programs. The season saw the return of many programs which had suspended play during World War II, and also the enrollment of many veterans returning from the war.

The teams ranked highest in the final Associated Press poll in December 1946 were:

1. The 1946 Notre Dame Fighting Irish football team compiled an 8–0–1 record and was ranked No. 1 in the final AP poll. The Fighting Irish, led by consensus All-Americans Johnny Lujack at quarterback and George Connor at tackle, played a scoreless tie against No. 2 Army in a game billed as the "Game of the Century". Notre Dame also ranked first in the nation in total offense (441.3 yards per game), rushing offense (340.1 yards per game), and total defense (141.7 yards per game).
2. The 1946 Army Cadets football team compiled a 9–0–1 and was ranked No. 2 in the final AP poll. Army had won consecutive national championships in 1944 and 1945 and was led by 1946 Heisman Trophy winner Glenn Davis and 1945 Heisman winner Doc Blanchard.
3. The 1946 Georgia Bulldogs football team compiled a perfect 11–0 record, won the Southeastern Conference (SEC) championship, was ranked No. 3 in the final AP poll, and defeated No. 9 North Carolina in the Sugar Bowl. The Bulldogs ranked second nationally in total offense (394.6 yards per game). They were led by Charley Trippi who tallied 1,366 yards of total offense and won the Maxwell Award as the best player in college football.
4. The 1946 UCLA Bruins football team compiled a 10–0 record in the regular season, won the Pacific Coast Conference (PCC) championship, was ranked No. 4 in the final AP poll, but lost to No. 5 Illinois in the Rose Bowl.

The year's statistical leaders included Rudy Mobley of Hardin–Simmons with 1,262 rushing yards, Travis Tidwell of Auburn with 1,715 yards of total offense, Bobby Layne of Texas with 1,122 passing yards, and Joe Carter of Florida N&I with 152 points scored.

Delaware compiled a 10–0 record and was recognized by the AP as the small college national champion. Morgan State (8–0) and Tennessee A&I (10–1) have been recognized as the black college national champions.

== Conference and program changes ==
=== Conference establishments ===
- Four conferences began football play in 1946:
  - College Conference of Illinois – an active NCAA Division III conference; now known as the College Conference of Illinois and Wisconsin
  - Dakota-Iowa Athletic Conference – a conference active through the 1948 season
  - Mason-Dixon Conference – an NCAA Division III conference active through the 1974 season
  - Mid-America Conference – an active NCAA Division I / FBS conference; now known as the Mid-American Conference

=== Membership changes ===
| School | 1945 Conference | 1946 Conference |
|---|---|---|
| Houston Cougars | Program Established | Lone Star |

== Season timeline ==
=== September ===
Significant games played in September 1946 included the following:

September 21

- Indiana was upset by Cincinnati, 15–6, at home in Bloomington. Indiana had won the Big Ten championship in 1945 with a No. 4 ranking in the final AP Poll.
- Houston played its first ever football game, losing by a 13–7 score against Southwestern Louisiana.

September 27–28

- Oklahoma A&M, AFCA national champion in 1945, was tied 21–21 by Arkansas
- Army defeated Oklahoma, 21–7, at West Point.
- Notre Dame won at Illinois, 26–6. Illinois went on to win the Big Nine championship.
- Georgia defeated Clemson, 35–12, in their annual rivalry game.
- Indiana lost again, 21–0 at Michigan.
- Tennessee defeated Georgia Tech, 13–9, in their annual rivalry game.
- UCLA beat Oregon State, 50–7. UCLA and Oregon State finished the season in first and second place in the Pacific Coast Conference.

=== October ===
October 5

- Army beat Cornell 46–21.
- Navy lost at Columbia and dropped the rest of its games, finishing 1–8–0.
- Oklahoma A&M lost 54–6 at Texas and would finish at 3–7–1.
- Notre Dame beat Pittsburgh 33–0.
- Michigan beat Iowa 14–7.
- UCLA won at Washington, 39–13.

The first AP Poll of the 1946 season was issued on October 7 with Texas ranked No. 1, Army No. 2, Notre Dame No. 3, Michigan No. 4 and UCLA No. 5.

October 12

- In Dallas, No. 1 Texas beat Oklahoma 20–13.
- No. 2 Army and No. 4 Michigan met in Ann Arbor, Michigan, and the visiting Cadets won 20–13.
- No. 3 Notre Dame beat Purdue 49–6.
- No. 5 UCLA beat No. 17 Stanford 26–6.

The next poll featured No. 1 Army, No. 2 Notre Dame, No. 3 Texas, No. 4 UCLA, and No. 5 Michigan.

October 19

- No. 1 Army beat No. 11 Columbia 48–14.
- No. 2 Notre Dame was idle.
- No. 3 Texas beat No. 14 Arkansas 20–0.
- No. 4 UCLA won at California 13–6.
- No. 5 Michigan and No. 10 Northwestern played to a 14–14 tie.
- No. 9 Tennessee beat No. 7 Alabama 12–0.

Army, Notre Dame, and Texas stayed as the top three, ahead of No. 4 Tennessee and No. 5 UCLA.

October 26

- At the Polo Grounds in New York, No. 1 Army beat No. 13 Duke 19–0. * No. 2 Notre Dame won at No. 17 Iowa, 49–6.
- In Houston, No. 3 Texas lost to No. 16 Rice, 18–13.
- No. 4 Tennessee lost to unranked Wake Forest, 19–6.
- No. 5 UCLA beat Santa Clara 33–7.
- No. 6 Penn beat Navy 32–19
- No. 7 Georgia won at Furman, 70–7.

The next poll was No. 1 Army, No. 2 Notre Dame, No. 3 Penn, No. 4 UCLA, and No. 5 Georgia.

=== November ===
November 2

- No. 1 Army beat West Virginia, 19–0.
- In Baltimore, No. 2 Notre Dame defeated Navy, 28–0.
- No. 3 Penn lost to Princeton, 17–14.
- No. 5 Georgia beat No. 15 Alabama, 14–0.
- No. 4 UCLA beat St. Mary's, 46–20, in a Friday night game.
- No. 8 Rice beat Texas Tech 41–6

In the poll that followed No. 1 Army, No. 2 Notre Dame, No. 3 Georgia, and No. 4 UCLA, and No. 5 Rice.

November 9

- A crowd of 74,000 turned out at New York's Yankee Stadium to watch No. 1 Army and No. 2 Notre Dame in a meeting of the nation's two unbeaten and untied teams. Both teams missed scoring opportunities. In the opening quarter, Army recovered a fumble on the Irish 24, but was stopped on fourth down at the 13 yard line. The Irish drove to the Army three yard line in the second quarter but no further. Army reached the Irish 20 yard line in the third quarter, but Notre Dame's Terry Brennan picked off a pass from Glenn Davis. In the last quarter, a bad punt was returned by Davis to the Irish 39 yard line, but Notre Dame forced a fumble and stopped any further scoring chances. The game ended in a scoreless tie, 0–0.

.

- In Jacksonville, No. 3 Georgia beat Florida 33–14.
- In Portland, No. 4 UCLA beat Oregon 14–0.
- No. 5 Rice lost in Little Rock to Arkansas, 7–0.

In the poll that followed, No. 9 Penn moved back up to No. 5 after beating Columbia in New York's "other" football game, 41–6. The top four remained the same.

November 16

- In its third meeting against a Top Five team, No. 1 Army beat No. 5 Penn in Philadelphia, 34–7.
- No. 2 Notre Dame beat Northwestern, 27–0.
- No. 3 Georgia beat Auburn 41–0 in a neutral site in Columbus, Georgia.
- No. 4 UCLA beat Montana 61–7.
- No. 9 Illinois beat No. 13 Ohio State 16–7 and replaced Penn at No. 5.

November 23

- No. 1 Army was idle.
- No. 2 Notre Dame beat Tulane in New Orleans, 41–0.
- No. 3 Georgia won at Chattanooga, 48–27.
- No. 4 UCLA defeated No. 10 USC 13–6.
- No. 5 Illinois won at Northwestern, 20–0, to close its season with an 8–1–0 record.
- No. 8 Michigan defeated Ohio State, 58–6, in Columbus.

The top five remained the same.

November 30

- No. 1 Army barely beat a 1–7–0 Navy team, 21–18
- No. 2 Notre Dame beat No. 16 USC 26–6. Army still had a 9–0–1 record and had been ranked No. 1 in 22 of the last 23 AP Polls dating back to 1944, but the results of the final games convinced the voters to move the Irish up to first place in the postseason poll and the Cadets down to second.
- No. 3 Georgia defeated No. 7 Georgia Tech 35–7
- No. 4 UCLA beat Nebraska, 18–0, and accepted an invitation to face No. 5 Illinois in the Rose Bowl.

With the exception of Notre Dame leapfrogging Army, the rankings of the other top-five teams remained the same.

=== December ===
On December 2, the final AP Poll was issued with Notre Dame at No. 1, Army at No. 2, Georgia at No. 3, UCLA at No. 4, Illinois at No. 5, Michigan at No. 6, Tennessee at No. 7, LSU at No. 8, North Carolina at No. 9, and Rice at No. 10.

Notable post-season games played in December included:

- December 7: Tennessee A&I defeated West Virginia State, 27–7, in the Derby Bowl
- December 7: Lincoln (PA) defeated Florida A&M, 20–14, in the Orange Blossom Classic
- December 7: Southern defeated Xavier of Louisiana, 35–0, in New Orleans
- December 7: Allen defeated Fayetteville State, 40–6, in the Piedmont Tobacco Bowl.
- December 14: Muhlenberg defeated St. Bonaventure, 26–25, in the Tobacco Bowl
- December 21: USC defeated Tulane, 20–13, in New Orleans
- December 23: Stanford defeated Hawaii, 18–7, in Honolulu.
- December 25: Southern defeated Tuskegee, 64–7, in the Yam Bowl
- December 28: Florida A&M and Wiley played to a 6–6 tie in the Angel Bowl.

=== New Year's Day bowl games ===
==== Major bowls ====
Wednesday, January 1, 1947

| Bowl game | Winning team | | Losing team | |
|---|---|---|---|---|
| Rose Bowl | No. 5 Illinois | 45 | No. 4 UCLA | 14 |
| Sugar Bowl | No. 3 Georgia | 20 | No. 9 North Carolina | 10 |
| Orange Bowl | No. 10 Rice | 8 | No. 7 Tennessee | 0 |
| Cotton Bowl | No. 16 Arkansas | 0 | No. 8 LSU | 0 |

No. 1 Notre Dame (8–0–1), No. 2 Army (9–0–1), and No. 6 Michigan (6–2–1) were idle in bowl season.

==== Other bowls ====
Wednesday, January 1, 1947

| Bowl game | Winning team | | Losing team | |
|---|---|---|---|---|
| Sun Bowl | Cincinnati | 18 | VPI | 6 |
| Gator Bowl | No. 14 Oklahoma | 34 | No. 18 NC State | 13 |
| Tangerine Bowl | Catawba | 31 | Maryville | 6 |
| Oil Bowl | No. 11 Georgia Tech | 41 | Saint Mary's | 19 |
| Raisin Bowl | Utah State | 0 | San Jose State | 20 |
| Harbor Bowl | Montana State | 13 | New Mexico | 13 |
| Alamo Bowl ^ | Hardin–Simmons | 20 | Denver | 0 |
| Cigar Bowl | No. 19 Delaware | 20 | Rollins | 3 |

^ The Alamo Bowl was postponed three days due to weather (ice).

- January 1: Tennessee A&I defeated Louisville Municipal, 32–0, in the Vulcan Bowl
- January 1: Lincoln (MO) defeated Prairie View A&M, 14–0, in the Prairie View Bowl.
- January 1: Arkansas AM&N defeated Lane, 7–0, in the Cattle Bowl.
- January 1: Pepperdine defeated Nebraska Wesleyan, 38–13, in the Will Rogers Bowl.

== Conference standings ==
=== Major conference standings ===
1946 Big Nine Conference football standings
| | Conf. | | | | | Overall |
| Team | W | | L | | T | W | | L | | T |
|---|---|---|---|---|---|---|---|---|---|---|
| No. 5 Illinois $ | 6 | – | 1 | – | 0 | 8 | – | 2 | – | 0 |
| No. 6 Michigan | 5 | – | 1 | – | 1 | 6 | – | 2 | – | 1 |
| No. 20 Indiana | 4 | – | 2 | – | 0 | 6 | – | 3 | – | 0 |
| Iowa | 3 | – | 3 | – | 0 | 5 | – | 4 | – | 0 |
| Minnesota | 3 | – | 4 | – | 0 | 5 | – | 4 | – | 0 |
| Ohio State | 2 | – | 3 | – | 1 | 4 | – | 3 | – | 2 |
| Northwestern | 2 | – | 3 | – | 1 | 4 | – | 4 | – | 1 |
| Wisconsin | 2 | – | 5 | – | 0 | 4 | – | 5 | – | 0 |
| Purdue | 0 | – | 5 | – | 1 | 2 | – | 6 | – | 1 |
$ – Conference champion; Rankings from AP Poll

1946 Big Six Conference football standings
| | Conf. | | | | | Overall |
| Team | W | | L | | T | W | | L | | T |
|---|---|---|---|---|---|---|---|---|---|---|
| Kansas + | 4 | – | 1 | – | 0 | 7 | – | 2 | – | 1 |
| No. 14 Oklahoma + | 4 | – | 1 | – | 0 | 8 | – | 3 | – | 0 |
| Missouri | 3 | – | 2 | – | 0 | 5 | – | 4 | – | 1 |
| Nebraska | 3 | – | 2 | – | 0 | 3 | – | 6 | – | 0 |
| Iowa State | 1 | – | 4 | – | 0 | 2 | – | 6 | – | 1 |
| Kansas State | 0 | – | 5 | – | 0 | 0 | – | 9 | – | 0 |
+ – Conference co-champions; Rankings from AP Poll

1946 Border Conference football standings
| | Conf. | | | | | Overall |
| Team | W | | L | | T | W | | L | | T |
|---|---|---|---|---|---|---|---|---|---|---|
| Hardin–Simmons $ | 6 | – | 0 | – | 0 | 11 | – | 0 | – | 0 |
| Texas Tech | 3 | – | 1 | – | 0 | 8 | – | 3 | – | 0 |
| New Mexico | 4 | – | 2 | – | 1 | 5 | – | 5 | – | 2 |
| Arizona | 2 | – | 2 | – | 1 | 4 | – | 4 | – | 2 |
| West Texas State | 3 | – | 4 | – | 0 | 5 | – | 5 | – | 0 |
| Arizona State–Flagstaff | 1 | – | 2 | – | 1 | 5 | – | 2 | – | 2 |
| Texas Mines | 2 | – | 4 | – | 0 | 3 | – | 6 | – | 0 |
| Arizona State | 1 | – | 4 | – | 1 | 2 | – | 7 | – | 2 |
| New Mexico A&M | 1 | – | 4 | – | 0 | 4 | – | 5 | – | 0 |
$ – Conference champion

1946 Ivy Group football standings
| | Conf. | | | | | Overall |
| Team | W | | L | | T | W | | L | | T |
|---|---|---|---|---|---|---|---|---|---|---|
| No. 12 Yale | 4 | – | 1 | – | 1 | 7 | – | 1 | – | 1 |
| Harvard | 3 | – | 1 | – | 0 | 7 | – | 2 | – | 0 |
| No. 13 Penn | 3 | – | 1 | – | 0 | 6 | – | 2 | – | 0 |
| Cornell | 3 | – | 1 | – | 1 | 5 | – | 3 | – | 1 |
| Columbia | 2 | – | 2 | – | 0 | 6 | – | 3 | – | 0 |
| Princeton | 2 | – | 4 | – | 0 | 3 | – | 5 | – | 0 |
| Brown | 1 | – | 3 | – | 0 | 3 | – | 5 | – | 1 |
| Dartmouth | 1 | – | 6 | – | 0 | 3 | – | 6 | – | 0 |
Rankings from AP Poll

1946 Missouri Valley Conference football standings
| | Conf. | | | | | Overall |
| Team | W | | L | | T | W | | L | | T |
|---|---|---|---|---|---|---|---|---|---|---|
| No. 17 Tulsa $ | 3 | – | 0 | – | 0 | 9 | – | 1 | – | 0 |
| Wichita | 2 | – | 1 | – | 0 | 5 | – | 5 | – | 0 |
| Saint Louis | 1 | – | 1 | – | 0 | 4 | – | 6 | – | 0 |
| Oklahoma A&M | 1 | – | 1 | – | 0 | 3 | – | 7 | – | 1 |
| Drake | 0 | – | 4 | – | 0 | 2 | – | 6 | – | 1 |
$ – Conference champion; Rankings from AP Poll

1946 Mountain States Conference football standings
| | Conf. | | | | | Overall |
| Team | W | | L | | T | W | | L | | T |
|---|---|---|---|---|---|---|---|---|---|---|
| Utah State $ | 4 | – | 1 | – | 1 | 7 | – | 2 | – | 1 |
| Denver $ | 4 | – | 1 | – | 1 | 5 | – | 5 | – | 1 |
| Utah | 4 | – | 2 | – | 0 | 8 | – | 3 | – | 0 |
| Colorado | 3 | – | 2 | – | 1 | 5 | – | 4 | – | 1 |
| BYU | 3 | – | 2 | – | 1 | 5 | – | 4 | – | 1 |
| Colorado A&M | 1 | – | 5 | – | 0 | 2 | – | 7 | – | 0 |
| Wyoming | 0 | – | 6 | – | 0 | 1 | – | 8 | – | 1 |
$ – Conference champion

1946 Pacific Coast Conference football standings
| | Conf. | | | | | Overall |
| Team | W | | L | | T | W | | L | | T |
|---|---|---|---|---|---|---|---|---|---|---|
| No. 4 UCLA $ | 7 | – | 0 | – | 0 | 10 | – | 1 | – | 0 |
| Oregon State | 6 | – | 1 | – | 1 | 7 | – | 1 | – | 1 |
| USC | 5 | – | 2 | – | 0 | 6 | – | 4 | – | 0 |
| Washington | 5 | – | 3 | – | 0 | 5 | – | 4 | – | 0 |
| Stanford | 3 | – | 3 | – | 1 | 6 | – | 3 | – | 1 |
| Oregon | 3 | – | 4 | – | 1 | 4 | – | 4 | – | 1 |
| Montana | 1 | – | 3 | – | 0 | 4 | – | 4 | – | 0 |
| Washington State | 1 | – | 5 | – | 1 | 1 | – | 6 | – | 1 |
| California | 1 | – | 6 | – | 0 | 2 | – | 7 | – | 0 |
| Idaho | 0 | – | 5 | – | 0 | 1 | – | 8 | – | 0 |
$ – Conference champion; Rankings from AP Poll

1946 Southeastern Conference football standings
| | Conf. | | | | | Overall |
| Team | W | | L | | T | W | | L | | T |
|---|---|---|---|---|---|---|---|---|---|---|
| No. 3 Georgia + | 5 | – | 0 | – | 0 | 11 | – | 0 | – | 0 |
| No. 7 Tennessee + | 5 | – | 0 | – | 0 | 9 | – | 2 | – | 0 |
| No. 8 LSU | 5 | – | 1 | – | 0 | 9 | – | 1 | – | 1 |
| No. 11 Georgia Tech | 4 | – | 2 | – | 0 | 9 | – | 2 | – | 0 |
| Mississippi State | 3 | – | 2 | – | 0 | 8 | – | 2 | – | 0 |
| Alabama | 4 | – | 3 | – | 0 | 7 | – | 4 | – | 0 |
| Vanderbilt | 3 | – | 4 | – | 0 | 5 | – | 4 | – | 0 |
| Kentucky | 2 | – | 3 | – | 0 | 7 | – | 3 | – | 0 |
| Tulane | 2 | – | 4 | – | 0 | 3 | – | 7 | – | 0 |
| Auburn | 1 | – | 5 | – | 0 | 4 | – | 6 | – | 0 |
| Ole Miss | 1 | – | 6 | – | 0 | 2 | – | 7 | – | 0 |
| Florida | 0 | – | 5 | – | 0 | 0 | – | 9 | – | 0 |
$ – Conference champion; Rankings from AP Poll

1946 Southern Conference football standings
| | Conf. | | | | | Overall |
| Team | W | | L | | T | W | | L | | T |
|---|---|---|---|---|---|---|---|---|---|---|
| No. 9 North Carolina $ | 4 | – | 0 | – | 1 | 8 | – | 2 | – | 1 |
| William & Mary | 7 | – | 1 | – | 0 | 8 | – | 2 | – | 0 |
| No. 18 NC State | 6 | – | 1 | – | 0 | 8 | – | 3 | – | 0 |
| South Carolina | 4 | – | 2 | – | 0 | 5 | – | 3 | – | 0 |
| Duke | 3 | – | 2 | – | 0 | 4 | – | 5 | – | 0 |
| Richmond | 3 | – | 2 | – | 2 | 6 | – | 2 | – | 2 |
| VPI | 3 | – | 3 | – | 2 | 3 | – | 4 | – | 3 |
| VMI | 2 | – | 3 | – | 1 | 4 | – | 5 | – | 1 |
| George Washington | 1 | – | 1 | – | 0 | 4 | – | 3 | – | 0 |
| Clemson | 2 | – | 3 | – | 0 | 4 | – | 5 | – | 0 |
| Wake Forest | 2 | – | 3 | – | 0 | 6 | – | 3 | – | 0 |
| Maryland | 2 | – | 5 | – | 0 | 3 | – | 6 | – | 0 |
| Furman | 1 | – | 4 | – | 0 | 2 | – | 8 | – | 0 |
| Washington and Lee | 1 | – | 4 | – | 0 | 2 | – | 6 | – | 0 |
| The Citadel | 1 | – | 5 | – | 0 | 3 | – | 5 | – | 0 |
| Davidson | 1 | – | 5 | – | 0 | 4 | – | 5 | – | 0 |
$ – Conference champion; Rankings from AP Poll

1946 Southwest Conference football standings
| | Conf. | | | | | Overall |
| Team | W | | L | | T | W | | L | | T |
|---|---|---|---|---|---|---|---|---|---|---|
| No. 10 Rice + | 5 | – | 1 | – | 0 | 9 | – | 2 | – | 0 |
| No. 16 Arkansas + | 5 | – | 1 | – | 0 | 6 | – | 3 | – | 2 |
| No. 15 Texas | 4 | – | 2 | – | 0 | 8 | – | 2 | – | 0 |
| Texas A&M | 4 | – | 2 | – | 0 | 4 | – | 6 | – | 0 |
| SMU | 2 | – | 4 | – | 0 | 4 | – | 5 | – | 1 |
| TCU | 2 | – | 4 | – | 0 | 2 | – | 7 | – | 1 |
| Baylor | 0 | – | 6 | – | 0 | 1 | – | 8 | – | 0 |
+ – Conference co-champions; Rankings from AP Poll

=== Major independents ===
1946 Eastern major college football independents records
| | Conf. | | | Overall |
| Team | W | L | T | W | | L | | T |
|---|---|---|---|---|---|---|---|---|
| No. 2 Army | | – | | 9 | – | 0 | – | 1 |
| Rutgers | | – | | 7 | – | 2 | – | 0 |
| Penn State | | – | | 6 | – | 2 | – | 0 |
| Boston College | | – | | 6 | – | 3 | – | 0 |
| Holy Cross | | – | | 5 | – | 4 | – | 0 |
| NYU | | – | | 5 | – | 3 | – | 0 |
| Villanova | | – | | 6 | – | 4 | – | 0 |
| Colgate | | – | | 4 | – | 4 | – | 0 |
| Syracuse | | – | | 4 | – | 5 | – | 0 |
| Pittsburgh | | – | | 3 | – | 5 | – | 1 |
| Temple | | – | | 2 | – | 4 | – | 2 |
| Merchant Marine | | – | | 4 | – | 7 | – | 0 |
| Bucknell | | – | | 3 | – | 6 | – | 0 |
| Lafayette | | – | | 2 | – | 7 | – | 0 |
| Fordham | | – | | 0 | – | 7 | – | 0 |
Rankings from AP Poll

1946 Midwestern major college football independents records
| | Conf. | | | Overall |
| Team | W | L | T | W | | L | | T |
|---|---|---|---|---|---|---|---|---|
| No. 1 Notre Dame | | – | | 8 | – | 0 | – | 1 |
| Cincinnati | | – | | 9 | – | 2 | – | 0 |
| Detroit | | – | | 6 | – | 4 | – | 0 |
| Michigan State | | – | | 5 | – | 5 | – | 0 |
| Marquette | | – | | 4 | – | 5 | – | 0 |
Rankings from AP Poll

1946 Southern major college football independents records
| | Conf. | | | Overall |
| Team | W | L | T | W | | L | | T |
|---|---|---|---|---|---|---|---|---|
| Miami (FL) | | – | | 8 | – | 2 | – | 0 |
| Georgetown | | – | | 5 | – | 3 | – | 0 |
| Virginia | | – | | 4 | – | 4 | – | 1 |
| Chattanooga | | – | | 5 | – | 5 | – | 0 |
| West Virginia | | – | | 5 | – | 5 | – | 0 |
| Navy | | – | | 1 | – | 8 | – | 0 |

1946 Western major college football independents records
| | Conf. | | | Overall |
| Team | W | L | T | W | | L | | T |
|---|---|---|---|---|---|---|---|---|
| Nevada | | – | | 7 | – | 2 | – | 0 |
| Saint Mary's | | – | | 6 | – | 3 | – | 0 |
| San Francisco | | – | | 3 | – | 6 | – | 0 |
| Santa Clara | | – | | 2 | – | 5 | – | 1 |
| Portland | | – | | 1 | – | 4 | – | 1 |

=== Minor conferences ===
| Conference | Champion(s) | Record |
|---|---|---|
| California Collegiate Athletic Association | San Jose State | 4–0 |
| Central Intercollegiate Athletics Association | Morgan State College | 7–0 |
| Central Intercollegiate Athletic Conference | Southwestern (KS) | 4–1 |
| College Conference of Illinois | North Central (IL) | 7–1 |
| Dakota-Iowa Athletic Conference | Westmar; Yankton | 4–1 |
| Far Western Conference | Humboldt State College | 1–0–1 |
| Indiana Intercollegiate Conference | Butler | 6–0 |
| Iowa Intercollegiate Athletic Conference | Central (IA); Upper Iowa | 6–0 |
| Kansas Collegiate Athletic Conference | Bethany | 5–1 |
| Lone Star Conference | North Texas State Teachers | 4–1 |
| Mason–Dixon Conference | Delaware | 3–0 |
| Michigan Intercollegiate Athletic Association | Kalamazoo; Hillsdale | 4–1 |
| Midwest Collegiate Athletic Conference | Lawrence | 6–0 |
| Minnesota Intercollegiate Athletic Conference | Gustavus Adolphus | 6–0 |
| Missouri Intercollegiate Athletic Association | Southeast Missouri State Teachers | 5–0 |
| Nebraska College Conference | Doane | 5–0–1 |
| New Mexico Intercollegiate Conference | Adams State College | 4–0 |
| North Central Intercollegiate Athletic Conference | Iowa State Teachers (Northern Iowa) | 2–0–1 |
| North Dakota College Athletic Conference | Minot State Teachers | 3–0–1 |
| Ohio Athletic Conference | Otterbein | 4–0 |
| Oklahoma Collegiate Athletic Conference | Southeastern State College (OK) | 4–1 |
| Pacific Northwest Conference | Willamette | 6–0 |
| Pennsylvania State Athletic Conference | California State Teachers | 4–0 |
| Rocky Mountain Athletic Conference | Montana State College | 2–0–1 |
| South Dakota Intercollegiate Conference | Black Hills Teachers | 4–0 |
| Southern California Intercollegiate Athletic Conference | Redlands | 2–0–2 |
| Southern Intercollegiate Athletic Conference | Florida A&M College | 6–0 |
| Southwestern Athletic Conference | Southern | 5–1 |
| State Teacher's College Conference of Minnesota | Duluth State Teachers; Mankato State Teachers | 2–0–2; 3–0–1 |
| Texas Collegiate Athletic Conference | Abilene Christian College; Southwestern (TX) | 3–0–1 |
| Washington Intercollegiate Conference | Central Washington | 5–0 |
| Wisconsin State Teachers College Conference | North: Superior State Teachers; Co-South: Milwaukee State Teachers; Co-South: Stevens Point State Teachers | 1–0–3; 3–1–0; 3–1 |

=== Small colleges conference standings ===
1946 Alabama Intercollegiate Conference football standings
| | Conf. | | | | | Overall |
| Team | W | | L | | T | W | | L | | T |
|---|---|---|---|---|---|---|---|---|---|---|
| Livingston State $ | 2 | – | 0 | – | 0 | 5 | – | 2 | – | 0 |
| Troy State | 3 | – | 1 | – | 0 | 3 | – | 4 | – | 0 |
| Jacksonville State | 1 | – | 1 | – | 1 | 3 | – | 5 | – | 1 |
| Marion | 1 | – | 2 | – | 0 | 2 | – | 2 | – | 0 |
| St. Bernard | 0 | – | 3 | – | 1 | 1 | – | 6 | – | 1 |
$ – Conference champion

1946 Arkansas Intercollegiate Conference football standings
| | Conf. | | | | | Overall |
| Team | W | | L | | T | W | | L | | T |
|---|---|---|---|---|---|---|---|---|---|---|
| Arkansas Tech $ | 6 | – | 0 | – | 0 | 9 | – | 1 | – | 0 |
| Ouachita Baptist | 5 | – | 1 | – | 0 | 5 | – | 4 | – | 0 |
| Henderson State | 4 | – | 2 | – | 0 | 6 | – | 3 | – | 1 |
| Magnolia A&M | 3 | – | 2 | – | 0 | 4 | – | 5 | – | 0 |
| Ozarks | 2 | – | 4 | – | 0 | 2 | – | 7 | – | 0 |
| Arkansas State Teachers | 1 | – | 3 | – | 0 | 2 | – | 6 | – | 0 |
| Hendrix | 1 | – | 5 | – | 0 | 1 | – | 8 | – | 0 |
| Monticello A&M | 1 | – | 6 | – | 0 | 1 | – | 6 | – | 1 |
$ – Conference champion

1946 Badger State Conference football standings
| | Conf. | | | | | Overall |
| Team | W | | L | | T | W | | L | | T |
|---|---|---|---|---|---|---|---|---|---|---|
| Northwestern (WI) $ | 2 | – | 0 | – | 1 | 3 | – | 2 | – | 1 |
| Wisconsin Tech | 2 | – | 1 | – | 0 | 2 | – | 1 | – | 0 |
| Mission House | 2 | – | 2 | – | 0 | 3 | – | 3 | – | 0 |
| Milton | 1 | – | 2 | – | 1 | 1 | – | 4 | – | 1 |
| Wisconsin–Extension | 1 | – | 3 | – | 0 | 1 | – | 4 | – | 1 |
$ – Conference champion

1946 California Collegiate Athletic Association football standings
| | Conf. | | | | | Overall |
| Team | W | | L | | T | W | | L | | T |
|---|---|---|---|---|---|---|---|---|---|---|
| San Jose State $ | 4 | – | 0 | – | 0 | 9 | – | 1 | – | 1 |
| Fresno State | 2 | – | 2 | – | 0 | 8 | – | 4 | – | 0 |
| San Diego State | 2 | – | 2 | – | 0 | 6 | – | 4 | – | 0 |
| Pacific (CA) | 2 | – | 2 | – | 0 | 4 | – | 7 | – | 0 |
| Santa Barbara | 0 | – | 4 | – | 0 | 2 | – | 6 | – | 0 |
$ – Conference champion

1946 Central Intercollegiate Conference football standings
| | Conf. | | | | | Overall |
| Team | W | | L | | T | W | | L | | T |
|---|---|---|---|---|---|---|---|---|---|---|
| Southwestern (KS) $ | 4 | – | 1 | – | 0 | 8 | – | 2 | – | 0 |
| Washburn | 3 | – | 1 | – | 1 | 6 | – | 2 | – | 1 |
| St. Benedict's | 2 | – | 2 | – | 1 | 4 | – | 3 | – | 1 |
| Pittsburg State | 1 | – | 2 | – | 2 | 4 | – | 2 | – | 3 |
| Fort Hays State | 1 | – | 2 | – | 2 | 2 | – | 4 | – | 2 |
| Emporia State | 1 | – | 4 | – | 0 | 4 | – | 5 | – | 0 |
$ – Conference champion

1946 College Conference of Illinois football standings
| | Conf. | | | | | Overall |
| Team | W | | L | | T | W | | L | | T |
|---|---|---|---|---|---|---|---|---|---|---|
| North Central (IL) $ | 7 | – | 1 | – | 0 | 7 | – | 1 | – | 0 |
| Illinois Wesleyan | 3 | – | 1 | – | 0 | 3 | – | 5 | – | 0 |
| Wheaton (IL) | 3 | – | 1 | – | 0 | 6 | – | 2 | – | 0 |
| Lake Forest | 3 | – | 1 | – | 0 | 3 | – | 3 | – | 0 |
| Augustana (IL) | 2 | – | 2 | – | 0 | 3 | – | 5 | – | 0 |
| Millikin | 1 | – | 3 | – | 0 | 2 | – | 6 | – | 0 |
| Illinois College | 1 | – | 4 | – | 0 | 2 | – | 5 | – | 1 |
| Elmhurst | 1 | – | 4 | – | 0 | 2 | – | 6 | – | 0 |
| Carthage | 0 | – | 4 | – | 0 | 0 | – | 7 | – | 1 |
$ – Conference champion

1946 Colored Intercollegiate Athletic Association football standings
| | Conf. | | | | | Overall |
| Team | W | | L | | T | W | | L | | T |
|---|---|---|---|---|---|---|---|---|---|---|
| No. 2 Morgan State $ | 7 | – | 0 | – | 0 | 8 | – | 0 | – | 0 |
| No. 10 West Virginia State | 5 | – | 2 | – | 0 | 6 | – | 3 | – | 1 |
| Virginia State | 5 | – | 2 | – | 0 | 7 | – | 2 | – | 0 |
| No. 16 Howard | 6 | – | 2 | – | 0 | 6 | – | 3 | – | 0 |
| No. 20 Lincoln (PA) | 4 | – | 2 | – | 0 | 6 | – | 3 | – | 0 |
| No. 16 North Carolina College | 5 | – | 3 | – | 0 | 7 | – | 3 | – | 0 |
| No. 18 North Carolina A&T | 3 | – | 4 | – | 0 | 4 | – | 4 | – | 0 |
| No. 19 Shaw | 3 | – | 3 | – | 1 | 5 | – | 3 | – | 1 |
| Delaware State | 3 | – | 4 | – | 0 | 5 | – | 4 | – | 0 |
| No. 22 Hampton | 4 | – | 4 | – | 0 | 4 | – | 4 | – | 0 |
| No. 18 Bluefield State | 3 | – | 4 | – | 1 | 4 | – | 4 | – | 1 |
| Winston-Salem State | 1 | – | 4 | – | 1 | 3 | – | 5 | – | 1 |
| No. 22 Virginia Union | 1 | – | 5 | – | 1 | 3 | – | 5 | – | 1 |
| Johnson C. Smith | 0 | – | 6 | – | 2 | 0 | – | 7 | – | 2 |
| Saint Paul's (VA) | 0 | – | 6 | – | 0 | 0 | – | 6 | – | 0 |
| St. Augustine's | 1 | – | 0 | – | 0 | 3 | – | 1 | – | 0 |
$ – Conference champion; Conference standings were based on the Dickinson System. St. Augustine's did not play the six conference games required to be eligible for the conference standings.

1946 Dakota-Iowa Athletic Conference football standings
| | Conf. | | | | | Overall |
| Team | W | | L | | T | W | | L | | T |
|---|---|---|---|---|---|---|---|---|---|---|
| Western Union + | 4 | – | 1 | – | 0 | 5 | – | 2 | – | 0 |
| Yankton + | 4 | – | 1 | – | 0 | 5 | – | 3 | – | 0 |
| Dakota Wesleyan | 2 | – | 2 | – | 0 | 4 | – | 7 | – | 0 |
| Buena Vista | 1 | – | 2 | – | 0 | 1 | – | 6 | – | 0 |
| Huron | 1 | – | 3 | – | 1 | 2 | – | 4 | – | 1 |
| Sioux Falls | 0 | – | 3 | – | 1 | 0 | – | 4 | – | 1 |
+ – Conference co-champions

1946 Eastern Conference (California) football standings
| | Conf. | | | | | Overall |
| Team | W | | L | | T | W | | L | | T |
|---|---|---|---|---|---|---|---|---|---|---|
| Chaffey $ | 4 | – | 0 | – | 1 | ? | – | ? | – | ? |
| Fullerton | 2 | – | 1 | – | 2 | 3 | – | 4 | – | 2 |
| Riverside | 3 | – | 2 | – | 0 | ? | – | ? | – | ? |
| Santa Ana | 2 | – | 3 | – | 0 | 8 | – | 3 | – | 0 |
| San Bernardino | 1 | – | 3 | – | 1 | 4 | – | 5 | – | 1 |
| Mt. San Antonio | 1 | – | 4 | – | 0 | ? | – | ? | – | ? |
$ – Conference champion

1946 Far Western Conference football standings
| | Conf. | | | | | Overall |
| Team | W | | L | | T | W | | L | | T |
|---|---|---|---|---|---|---|---|---|---|---|
| Humboldt State | 1 | – | 0 | – | 1 | 5 | – | 3 | – | 1 |
| Chico State | 1 | – | 1 | – | 0 | 2 | – | 7 | – | 0 |
| Cal Aggies | 0 | – | 1 | – | 1 | 0 | – | 5 | – | 2 |
No conference champion was named in 1946.

1946 Illinois Intercollegiate Athletic Conference football standings
| | Conf. | | | | | Overall |
| Team | W | | L | | T | W | | L | | T |
|---|---|---|---|---|---|---|---|---|---|---|
| Northern Illinois State $ | 4 | – | 0 | – | 0 | 9 | – | 2 | – | 0 |
| Southern Illinois | 3 | – | 1 | – | 0 | 4 | – | 4 | – | 0 |
| Illinois State Normal | 2 | – | 2 | – | 0 | 6 | – | 3 | – | 0 |
| Eastern Illinois | 1 | – | 3 | – | 0 | 2 | – | 6 | – | 0 |
| Western Illinois | 0 | – | 4 | – | 0 | 2 | – | 6 | – | 0 |
$ – Conference champion

1946 Indiana Intercollegiate Conference football standings
| | Conf. | | | | | Overall |
| Team | W | | L | | T | W | | L | | T |
|---|---|---|---|---|---|---|---|---|---|---|
| Butler $ | 6 | – | 0 | – | 0 | 7 | – | 1 | – | 0 |
| Evansville | 2 | – | 0 | – | 0 | 7 | – | 1 | – | 2 |
| Wabash | 5 | – | 1 | – | 0 | 7 | – | 1 | – | 0 |
| Earlham | 4 | – | 2 | – | 0 | 5 | – | 3 | – | 0 |
| Saint Joseph's (IN) | 2 | – | 1 | – | 0 | 3 | – | 4 | – | 0 |
| Hanover | 3 | – | 2 | – | 0 | 4 | – | 3 | – | 0 |
| Franklin (IN) | 3 | – | 3 | – | 0 | 4 | – | 4 | – | 0 |
| Ball State | 3 | – | 3 | – | 0 | 3 | – | 4 | – | 1 |
| Indiana Central | 3 | – | 4 | – | 0 | 3 | – | 4 | – | 0 |
| Indiana State | 2 | – | 4 | – | 0 | 4 | – | 4 | – | 0 |
| Manchester | 2 | – | 4 | – | 0 | 3 | – | 5 | – | 0 |
| DePauw | 1 | – | 2 | – | 0 | 1 | – | 5 | – | 2 |
| Canterbury | 1 | – | 4 | – | 0 | 1 | – | 7 | – | 0 |
| Rose Poly | 1 | – | 5 | – | 0 | 1 | – | 7 | – | 1 |
| Valparaiso | 0 | – | 3 | – | 0 | 1 | – | 7 | – | 0 |
$ – Conference champion

1946 Iowa Conference football standings
| | Conf. | | | | | Overall |
| Team | W | | L | | T | W | | L | | T |
|---|---|---|---|---|---|---|---|---|---|---|
| Central (IA) + | 6 | – | 0 | – | 0 | 7 | – | 1 | – | 0 |
| Upper Iowa + | 6 | – | 0 | – | 0 | 6 | – | 0 | – | 0 |
| St. Ambrose | 1 | – | 0 | – | 0 | 5 | – | 3 | – | 0 |
| Parsons | 4 | – | 2 | – | 0 | 4 | – | 4 | – | 0 |
| Dubuque | 4 | – | 3 | – | 0 | 5 | – | 4 | – | 0 |
| Luther | 3 | – | 2 | – | 0 | 3 | – | 6 | – | 0 |
| Simpson (IA) | 2 | – | 3 | – | 0 | 3 | – | 5 | – | 1 |
| Iowa Wesleyan | 1 | – | 4 | – | 0 | 3 | – | 6 | – | 0 |
| Buena Vista | 1 | – | 4 | – | 0 | 1 | – | 6 | – | 0 |
| Wartburg | 1 | – | 5 | – | 0 | 2 | – | 5 | – | 0 |
| Western Union | 0 | – | 1 | – | 0 | 5 | – | 2 | – | 0 |
| Loras | 0 | – | 1 | – | 0 | 1 | – | 7 | – | 0 |
| William Penn | 0 | – | 4 | – | 0 | 0 | – | 6 | – | 0 |
+ – Conference co-champions

1946 Kansas Collegiate Athletic Conference football standings
| | Conf. | | | | | Overall |
| Team | W | | L | | T | W | | L | | T |
|---|---|---|---|---|---|---|---|---|---|---|
| Bethany (KS) $ | 5 | – | 1 | – | 0 | 6 | – | 2 | – | 0 |
| Ottawa | 4 | – | 1 | – | 1 | 7 | – | 1 | – | 1 |
| Baker | 4 | – | 1 | – | 1 | 5 | – | 3 | – | 1 |
| McPherson | 3 | – | 2 | – | 1 | 4 | – | 3 | – | 1 |
| Kansas Wesleyan | 2 | – | 3 | – | 1 | 3 | – | 4 | – | 2 |
| Bethel (KS) | 1 | – | 5 | – | 0 | 2 | – | 6 | – | 0 |
| College of Emporia | 0 | – | 6 | – | 0 | 1 | – | 8 | – | 0 |
$ – Conference champion

1946 Kentucky Intercollegiate Athletic Conference football standings
| | Conf. | | | | | Overall |
| Team | W | | L | | T | W | | L | | T |
|---|---|---|---|---|---|---|---|---|---|---|
| Eastern Kentucky $ | 3 | – | 1 | – | 0 | 5 | – | 4 | – | 0 |
| Morehead State | 2 | – | 1 | – | 0 | 6 | – | 1 | – | 0 |
| Murray State | 2 | – | 1 | – | 0 | 5 | – | 5 | – | 0 |
| Louisville | 2 | – | 2 | – | 0 | 6 | – | 2 | – | 0 |
| Western Kentucky State Teachers | 1 | – | 3 | – | 0 | 2 | – | 6 | – | 0 |
| Georgetown (KY) | 0 | – | 2 | – | 0 | 2 | – | 6 | – | 1 |
$ – Conference champion

1946 Lone Star Conference football standings
| | Conf. | | | | | Overall |
| Team | W | | L | | T | W | | L | | T |
|---|---|---|---|---|---|---|---|---|---|---|
| North Texas State $ | 4 | – | 1 | – | 0 | 7 | – | 3 | – | 1 |
| Sam Houston State | 3 | – | 1 | – | 1 | 6 | – | 2 | – | 1 |
| East Texas State | 3 | – | 1 | – | 1 | 5 | – | 2 | – | 2 |
| Southwest Texas State | 3 | – | 2 | – | 0 | 6 | – | 2 | – | 2 |
| Houston | 1 | – | 4 | – | 0 | 4 | – | 6 | – | 0 |
| Stephen F. Austin | 0 | – | 5 | – | 0 | 1 | – | 9 | – | 0 |
$ – Conference champion

1946 Louisiana Intercollegiate Conference football standings
| | Conf. | | | | | Overall |
| Team | W | | L | | T | W | | L | | T |
|---|---|---|---|---|---|---|---|---|---|---|
| Southeastern Louisiana $ | 4 | – | 0 | – | 0 | 9 | – | 0 | – | 0 |
| Louisiana Tech | 3 | – | 1 | – | 0 | 7 | – | 3 | – | 0 |
| Southwestern Louisiana | 2 | – | 2 | – | 0 | 6 | – | 4 | – | 0 |
| Northwestern State | 1 | – | 3 | – | 0 | 4 | – | 6 | – | 0 |
| Louisiana College | 0 | – | 4 | – | 0 | 1 | – | 8 | – | 0 |
$ – Conference champion

1946 Maine Intercollegiate Athletic Conference football standings
| | Conf. | | | | | Overall |
| Team | W | | L | | T | W | | L | | T |
|---|---|---|---|---|---|---|---|---|---|---|
| Bates $ | 3 | – | 0 | – | 0 | 7 | – | 1 | – | 0 |
| Maine | 2 | – | 1 | – | 0 | 2 | – | 5 | – | 0 |
| Bowdoin | 1 | – | 2 | – | 0 | 2 | – | 4 | – | 0 |
| Colby | 0 | – | 3 | – | 0 | 1 | – | 6 | – | 0 |
+ – Conference co-champions

1946 Mason–Dixon Conference football standings
| | Conf. | | | | | Overall |
| Team | W | | L | | T | W | | L | | T |
|---|---|---|---|---|---|---|---|---|---|---|
| No. 19 Delaware $ | 3 | – | 0 | – | 0 | 10 | – | 0 | – | 0 |
| Johns Hopkins | 2 | – | 0 | – | 0 | 5 | – | 3 | – | 0 |
| Western Maryland | 4 | – | 1 | – | 0 | 5 | – | 2 | – | 0 |
| Hampden–Sydney | 2 | – | 2 | – | 0 | 2 | – | 2 | – | 0 |
| Randolph–Macon | 2 | – | 4 | – | 0 | 2 | – | 4 | – | 0 |
| Washington College | 1 | – | 5 | – | 0 | 1 | – | 5 | – | 0 |
| Mount St. Mary's | 0 | – | 2 | – | 0 | 0 | – | 2 | – | 0 |
$ – Conference champion; Rankings from AP Poll

1946 Michigan Intercollegiate Athletic Association football standings
| | Conf. | | | | | Overall |
| Team | W | | L | | T | W | | L | | T |
|---|---|---|---|---|---|---|---|---|---|---|
| Hillsdale + | 4 | – | 1 | – | 0 | 7 | – | 1 | – | 0 |
| Kalamazoo + | 4 | – | 1 | – | 0 | 6 | – | 2 | – | 0 |
| Hope | 3 | – | 2 | – | 0 | 6 | – | 2 | – | 0 |
| Albion | 2 | – | 3 | – | 0 | 3 | – | 5 | – | 0 |
| Alma | 2 | – | 3 | – | 0 | 2 | – | 5 | – | 0 |
| Adrian | 0 | – | 5 | – | 0 | 0 | – | 8 | – | 0 |
+ – Conference co-champions

1946 Midwest Athletic Association football standings
| | Conf. | | | | | Overall |
| Team | W | | L | | T | W | | L | | T |
|---|---|---|---|---|---|---|---|---|---|---|
| No. 1 Tennessee A&I $ | 3 | – | 0 | – | 0 | 10 | – | 1 | – | 0 |
| No. 4 Wilberforce | 2 | – | 1 | – | 1 | 5 | – | 2 | – | 2 |
| No. 7 Lincoln (MO) | 2 | – | 1 | – | 1 | 5 | – | 3 | – | 1 |
| Philander Smith | 0 | – | 2 | – | 0 | 1 | – | 9 | – | 0 |
| No. 19 Kentucky State | 0 | – | 3 | – | 0 | 5 | – | 4 | – | 0 |
$ – Conference champion; Rankings from Pittsburgh Courier Dickinson System

1946 Midwest Conference football standings
| | Conf. | | | | | Overall |
| Team | W | | L | | T | W | | L | | T |
|---|---|---|---|---|---|---|---|---|---|---|
| Lawrence $ | 6 | – | 0 | – | 0 | 6 | – | 1 | – | 1 |
| Ripon | 3 | – | 1 | – | 1 | 4 | – | 3 | – | 1 |
| Cornell (IA) | 4 | – | 2 | – | 1 | 5 | – | 2 | – | 1 |
| Carleton | 3 | – | 2 | – | 0 | 5 | – | 3 | – | 0 |
| Monmouth (IL) | 2 | – | 3 | – | 0 | 4 | – | 4 | – | 0 |
| Beloit | 2 | – | 4 | – | 0 | 4 | – | 4 | – | 0 |
| Grinnell | 2 | – | 4 | – | 0 | 3 | – | 5 | – | 0 |
| Knox | 2 | – | 4 | – | 0 | 3 | – | 5 | – | 0 |
| Coe | 1 | – | 5 | – | 0 | 3 | – | 5 | – | 0 |
$ – Conference champion

1946 Minnesota Intercollegiate Athletic Conference football standings
| | Conf. | | | | | Overall |
| Team | W | | L | | T | W | | L | | T |
|---|---|---|---|---|---|---|---|---|---|---|
| Gustavus Adolphus $ | 6 | – | 0 | – | 0 | 7 | – | 0 | – | 1 |
| St. Olaf | 3 | – | 1 | – | 0 | 6 | – | 2 | – | 0 |
| St. Thomas (MN) | 3 | – | 1 | – | 0 | 4 | – | 3 | – | 0 |
| Concordia (MN) | 2 | – | 2 | – | 0 | 3 | – | 3 | – | 1 |
| Saint John's (MN) | 2 | – | 3 | – | 0 | 5 | – | 3 | – | 0 |
| Saint Mary's (MN) | 1 | – | 2 | – | 1 | 4 | – | 3 | – | 1 |
| Augsburg | 1 | – | 5 | – | 0 | 1 | – | 6 | – | 0 |
| Macalester | 0 | – | 4 | – | 1 | 1 | – | 6 | – | 1 |
$ – Conference champion

1946 Minnesota Teachers College Conference football standings
| | Conf. | | | | | Overall |
| Team | W | | L | | T | W | | L | | T |
|---|---|---|---|---|---|---|---|---|---|---|
| Mankato State + | 3 | – | 0 | – | 1 | 5 | – | 1 | – | 1 |
| Duluth State + | 2 | – | 0 | – | 2 | 4 | – | 1 | – | 2 |
| Bemidji State | 2 | – | 2 | – | 0 | 3 | – | 4 | – | 0 |
| St. Cloud State | 2 | – | 2 | – | 0 | 3 | – | 4 | – | 0 |
| Moorhead State | 1 | – | 2 | – | 1 | 2 | – | 3 | – | 2 |
| Winona State | 0 | – | 4 | – | 0 | 0 | – | 6 | – | 0 |
+ – Conference co-champions

1946 Missouri College Athletic Union football standings
| | Conf. | | | | | Overall |
| Team | W | | L | | T | W | | L | | T |
|---|---|---|---|---|---|---|---|---|---|---|
| Missouri Valley $ | 4 | – | 0 | – | 0 | 10 | – | 0 | – | 0 |
| Central (MO) | 2 | – | 1 | – | 1 | 4 | – | 3 | – | 1 |
| William Jewell | 2 | – | 2 | – | 0 | 4 | – | 5 | – | 0 |
| Culver–Stockton | 1 | – | 3 | – | 0 | 4 | – | 4 | – | 0 |
| Tarkio | 0 | – | 3 | – | 1 | 0 | – | 7 | – | 1 |
$ – Conference champion

1946 Missouri Intercollegiate Athletic Association football standings
| | Conf. | | | | | Overall |
| Team | W | | L | | T | W | | L | | T |
|---|---|---|---|---|---|---|---|---|---|---|
| Southeast Missouri State $ | 5 | – | 0 | – | 0 | 8 | – | 0 | – | 1 |
| Missouri Mines | 3 | – | 1 | – | 1 | 4 | – | 3 | – | 2 |
| Kirksville State | 2 | – | 1 | – | 2 | 5 | – | 2 | – | 2 |
| Northwest Missouri State | 2 | – | 3 | – | 0 | 4 | – | 3 | – | 0 |
| Southwest Missouri State | 1 | – | 4 | – | 0 | 2 | – | 6 | – | 0 |
| Central Missouri State | 0 | – | 4 | – | 1 | 4 | – | 5 | – | 1 |
$ – Conference champion

1946 Nebraska College Conference football standings
| | Conf. | | | | | Overall |
| Team | W | | L | | T | W | | L | | T |
|---|---|---|---|---|---|---|---|---|---|---|
| Doane $ | 5 | – | 0 | – | 1 | 6 | – | 2 | – | 1 |
| Nebraska Wesleyan | 5 | – | 0 | – | 2 | 7 | – | 1 | – | 3 |
| Kearney State | 5 | – | 2 | – | 1 | 6 | – | 2 | – | 1 |
| Peru State | 4 | – | 3 | – | 1 | 4 | – | 4 | – | 1 |
| Midland | 3 | – | 4 | – | 0 | 4 | – | 4 | – | 0 |
| Wayne State (NE) | 2 | – | 3 | – | 0 | 4 | – | 3 | – | 0 |
| Hastings | 1 | – | 4 | – | 1 | 1 | – | 6 | – | 1 |
| Chadron State | 1 | – | 5 | – | 0 | 3 | – | 7 | – | 0 |
| York (NE) | 0 | – | 6 | – | 0 | 3 | – | 6 | – | 0 |
$ – Conference champion

1946 New England Conference football standings
| | Conf. | | | | | Overall |
| Team | W | | L | | T | W | | L | | T |
|---|---|---|---|---|---|---|---|---|---|---|
| New Hampshire + | 2 | – | 0 | – | 1 | 6 | – | 1 | – | 1 |
| Connecticut + | 2 | – | 0 | – | 1 | 4 | – | 3 | – | 1 |
| Rhode Island State | 1 | – | 2 | – | 0 | 2 | – | 4 | – | 0 |
| Maine | 0 | – | 3 | – | 0 | 2 | – | 5 | – | 0 |
+ – Conference co-champions

1946 New Mexico Conference football standings
| | Conf. | | | | | Overall |
| Team | W | | L | | T | W | | L | | T |
|---|---|---|---|---|---|---|---|---|---|---|
| Adams State $ | 4 | – | 0 | – | 0 | 5 | – | 1 | – | 0 |
| New Mexico Teachers | 3 | – | 1 | – | 0 | 4 | – | 5 | – | 0 |
| New Mexico Military | 2 | – | 2 | – | 0 | ? | – | ? | – | ? |
| Eastern New Mexico | 1 | – | 3 | – | 0 | 1 | – | 7 | – | 1 |
| New Mexico Highlands | 0 | – | 4 | – | 0 | 1 | – | 5 | – | 1 |
$ – Conference champion

1946 North Dakota Intercollegiate Conference football standings
| | Conf. | | | | | Overall |
| Team | W | | L | | T | W | | L | | T |
|---|---|---|---|---|---|---|---|---|---|---|
| Minot State $ | 3 | – | 0 | – | 1 | 6 | – | 0 | – | 1 |
| Valley City State | 4 | – | 1 | – | 0 | 5 | – | 1 | – | 0 |
| Wahpeton Science | 3 | – | 1 | – | 0 | 4 | – | 2 | – | 0 |
| Jamestown | 2 | – | 2 | – | 1 | 2 | – | 4 | – | 1 |
| Ellendale | 1 | – | 3 | – | 1 | 1 | – | 5 | – | 1 |
| Dickinson State | 1 | – | 3 | – | 0 | 2 | – | 4 | – | 0 |
| Mayville State | 0 | – | 4 | – | 1 | 0 | – | 5 | – | 1 |
$ – Conference champion

1946 North Central Conference football standings
| | Conf. | | | | | Overall |
| Team | W | | L | | T | W | | L | | T |
|---|---|---|---|---|---|---|---|---|---|---|
| Iowa State Teachers $ | 2 | – | 0 | – | 1 | 4 | – | 1 | – | 2 |
| North Dakota Agricultural | 4 | – | 1 | – | 0 | 5 | – | 3 | – | 0 |
| South Dakota State | 2 | – | 1 | – | 2 | 3 | – | 3 | – | 2 |
| North Dakota | 2 | – | 2 | – | 0 | 4 | – | 3 | – | 0 |
| Morningside | 2 | – | 3 | – | 1 | 3 | – | 5 | – | 1 |
| South Dakota | 1 | – | 2 | – | 0 | 2 | – | 4 | – | 0 |
| Augustana (SD) | 0 | – | 4 | – | 0 | 0 | – | 6 | – | 1 |
$ – Conference champion

1946 North State Conference football standings
| | Conf. | | | | | Overall |
| Team | W | | L | | T | W | | L | | T |
|---|---|---|---|---|---|---|---|---|---|---|
| Catawba $ | 5 | – | 0 | – | 0 | 10 | – | 2 | – | 0 |
| Appalachian State | 4 | – | 1 | – | 0 | 6 | – | 3 | – | 0 |
| High Point | 3 | – | 2 | – | 1 | 7 | – | 2 | – | 1 |
| Western Carolina | 1 | – | 1 | – | 1 | 6 | – | 3 | – | 1 |
| Lenoir Rhyne | 3 | – | 5 | – | 0 | 5 | – | 6 | – | 0 |
| Guilford | 1 | – | 2 | – | 1 | 6 | – | 2 | – | 1 |
| Elon | 1 | – | 4 | – | 1 | 4 | – | 5 | – | 1 |
| Atlantic Christian | 0 | – | 3 | – | 0 | 2 | – | 4 | – | 1 |
$ – Conference champion

1946 Northwest Conference football standings
| | Conf. | | | | | Overall |
| Team | W | | L | | T | W | | L | | T |
|---|---|---|---|---|---|---|---|---|---|---|
| Willamette $ | 6 | – | 0 | – | 0 | 6 | – | 2 | – | 1 |
| College of Idaho | 4 | – | 2 | – | 0 | 6 | – | 4 | – | 0 |
| Linfield | 3 | – | 2 | – | 1 | 4 | – | 4 | – | 0 |
| Puget Sound | 3 | – | 2 | – | 1 | 3 | – | 4 | – | 1 |
| Pacific (OR) | 3 | – | 3 | – | 0 | 4 | – | 3 | – | 1 |
| Whitman | 1 | – | 5 | – | 0 | 2 | – | 5 | – | 0 |
| British Columbia | 0 | – | 6 | – | 0 | 0 | – | 7 | – | 0 |
| Lewis & Clark | | | – | | | 3 | – | 4 | – | 1 |
$ – Conference champion

1946 Ohio Athletic Conference football standings
| | Conf. | | | | | Overall |
| Team | W | | L | | T | W | | L | | T |
|---|---|---|---|---|---|---|---|---|---|---|
| Otterbein $ | 5 | – | 0 | – | 0 | 7 | – | 1 | – | 0 |
| Toledo | 4 | – | 0 | – | 0 | 6 | – | 2 | – | 2 |
| Muskingum | 4 | – | 0 | – | 1 | 5 | – | 3 | – | 1 |
| Oberlin | 2 | – | 0 | – | 0 | 4 | – | 2 | – | 1 |
| Baldwin–Wallace | 4 | – | 1 | – | 0 | 4 | – | 2 | – | 2 |
| Mount Union | 5 | – | 1 | – | 1 | 7 | – | 1 | – | 1 |
| Findlay | 3 | – | 1 | – | 0 | 6 | – | 2 | – | 0 |
| Marietta | 3 | – | 1 | – | 0 | 3 | – | 4 | – | 0 |
| Heidelberg | 5 | – | 2 | – | 1 | 5 | – | 2 | – | 1 |
| Kent State | 1 | – | 1 | – | 0 | 6 | – | 2 | – | 0 |
| Akron | 3 | – | 4 | – | 0 | 5 | – | 4 | – | 0 |
| Wittenberg | 3 | – | 4 | – | 0 | 3 | – | 5 | – | 0 |
| Ashland | 2 | – | 3 | – | 1 | 2 | – | 5 | – | 1 |
| Wooster | 2 | – | 4 | – | 2 | 2 | – | 4 | – | 2 |
| Denison | 2 | – | 4 | – | 0 | 2 | – | 6 | – | 0 |
| Case | 1 | – | 4 | – | 0 | 2 | – | 7 | – | 0 |
| John Carroll | 1 | – | 4 | – | 0 | 1 | – | 7 | – | 0 |
| Kenyon | 1 | – | 5 | – | 0 | 1 | – | 7 | – | 0 |
| Capital | 1 | – | 6 | – | 0 | 1 | – | 6 | – | 0 |
| Wilmington (OH) | 0 | – | 2 | – | 0 | 0 | – | 5 | – | 0 |
| Ohio Northern | 0 | – | 6 | – | 0 | 3 | – | 6 | – | 0 |
$ – Conference champion

1946 Oklahoma Collegiate Conference football standings
| | Conf. | | | | | Overall |
| Team | W | | L | | T | W | | L | | T |
|---|---|---|---|---|---|---|---|---|---|---|
| Southeastern (OK) $ | 4 | – | 1 | – | 0 | 9 | – | 3 | – | 0 |
| Central State (OK) | 3 | – | 1 | – | 1 | 4 | – | 4 | – | 1 |
| Southwestern Tech | 2 | – | 2 | – | 1 | 5 | – | 3 | – | 1 |
| East Central | 2 | – | 3 | – | 0 | 5 | – | 5 | – | 1 |
| Northeastern State | 2 | – | 3 | – | 0 | 4 | – | 6 | – | 0 |
| Northwestern State (OK) | 1 | – | 4 | – | 0 | 3 | – | 5 | – | 0 |
$ – Conference champion

1946 Oklahoma Junior College Conference football standings
| | Conf. | | | | | Overall |
| Team | W | | L | | T | W | | L | | T |
|---|---|---|---|---|---|---|---|---|---|---|
| Cameron $ | 6 | – | 0 | – | 0 | 9 | – | 1 | – | 0 |
| Bacone | 5 | – | 1 | – | 1 | 6 | – | 2 | – | 1 |
| Northeastern Oklahoma | 4 | – | 2 | – | 0 | 6 | – | 4 | – | 0 |
| Connors | 3 | – | 3 | – | 0 | 3 | – | 4 | – | 0 |
| Murray Aggies | 1 | – | 3 | – | 2 | 1 | – | 6 | – | 2 |
| Northern Oklahoma | 1 | – | 4 | – | 1 | 3 | – | 4 | – | 1 |
| Oklahoma Military Academy | 0 | – | 1 | – | 0 | 5 | – | 2 | – | 0 |
| Eastern Oklahoma | 0 | – | 6 | – | 0 | 0 | – | 9 | – | 0 |
$ – Conference champion

1946 Pennsylvania State Teachers College Conference football standings
| | Conf. | | | | | Overall |
| Team | W | | L | | T | W | | L | | T |
|---|---|---|---|---|---|---|---|---|---|---|
| California (PA) $ | 4 | – | 0 | – | 0 | 9 | – | 0 | – | 0 |
| Mansfield | 5 | – | 0 | – | 1 | 7 | – | 0 | – | 1 |
| West Chester | 2 | – | 1 | – | 0 | 9 | – | 1 | – | 0 |
| Slippery Rock | 2 | – | 1 | – | 0 | 3 | – | 4 | – | 1 |
| Indiana (PA) | 3 | – | 3 | – | 0 | 5 | – | 3 | – | 0 |
| Bloomsburg | 3 | – | 3 | – | 1 | 4 | – | 3 | – | 1 |
| Millersville | 3 | – | 3 | – | 0 | 3 | – | 3 | – | 0 |
| Clarion | 2 | – | 2 | – | 0 | 3 | – | 4 | – | 0 |
| Lock Haven | 3 | – | 4 | – | 1 | 4 | – | 5 | – | 1 |
| East Stroudsburg | 1 | – | 2 | – | 0 | 5 | – | 2 | – | 0 |
| Shippensburg | 2 | – | 5 | – | 1 | 2 | – | 5 | – | 1 |
| Kutztown | 1 | – | 4 | – | 0 | 3 | – | 4 | – | 0 |
| Edinboro | 0 | – | 3 | – | 0 | 0 | – | 6 | – | 0 |
$ – Conference champion

1946 Rocky Mountain Conference football standings
| | Conf. | | | | | Overall |
| Team | W | | L | | T | W | | L | | T |
|---|---|---|---|---|---|---|---|---|---|---|
| Montana State $ | 2 | – | 0 | – | 1 | 5 | – | 3 | – | 2 |
| Colorado State–Greeley | 3 | – | 1 | – | 0 | 6 | – | 3 | – | 0 |
| Western State (CO) | 1 | – | 1 | – | 0 | 5 | – | 4 | – | 1 |
| Colorado College | 0 | – | 1 | – | 1 | 4 | – | 4 | – | 1 |
| Colorado Mines | 0 | – | 3 | – | 0 | 1 | – | 4 | – | 1 |
$ – Conference champion

1946 Smoky Mountain Conference football standings
| | Conf. | | | | | Overall |
| Team | W | | L | | T | W | | L | | T |
|---|---|---|---|---|---|---|---|---|---|---|
| Milligan $ | 3 | – | 0 | – | 0 | 6 | – | 3 | – | 1 |
| Carson–Newman | 2 | – | 1 | – | 0 | 5 | – | 3 | – | 1 |
| Emory and Henry | 1 | – | 2 | – | 0 | 3 | – | 7 | – | 0 |
| Tusculum | 0 | – | 3 | – | 0 | 1 | – | 7 | – | 0 |
$ – Conference champion

1946 South Dakota Intercollegiate Conference football standings
| | Conf. | | | | | Overall |
| Team | W | | L | | T | W | | L | | T |
|---|---|---|---|---|---|---|---|---|---|---|
| Black Hills $ | 3 | – | 0 | – | 0 | 5 | – | 2 | – | 0 |
| Northern State | 1 | – | 0 | – | 0 | 6 | – | 2 | – | 0 |
| Southern State (SD) | 1 | – | 1 | – | 0 | 2 | – | 4 | – | 0 |
| South Dakota Mines | 1 | – | 2 | – | 0 | 2 | – | 6 | – | 0 |
| Eastern Normal | 0 | – | 3 | – | 0 | 0 | – | 5 | – | 0 |
$ – Conference champion

x

1946 Rocky Mountain Conference football standings
| | Conf. | | | | | Overall |
| Team | W | | L | | T | W | | L | | T |
|---|---|---|---|---|---|---|---|---|---|---|
| Montana State $ | 2 | – | 0 | – | 1 | 5 | – | 3 | – | 2 |
| Colorado State–Greeley | 3 | – | 1 | – | 0 | 6 | – | 3 | – | 0 |
| Western State (CO) | 1 | – | 1 | – | 0 | 5 | – | 4 | – | 1 |
| Colorado College | 0 | – | 1 | – | 1 | 4 | – | 4 | – | 1 |
| Colorado Mines | 0 | – | 3 | – | 0 | 1 | – | 4 | – | 1 |
$ – Conference champion

1946 Southern California Conference football standings
| | Conf. | | | | | Overall |
| Team | W | | L | | T | W | | L | | T |
|---|---|---|---|---|---|---|---|---|---|---|
| Redlands $ | 2 | – | 0 | – | 2 | 4 | – | 2 | – | 2 |
| Whittier | 2 | – | 1 | – | 1 | 3 | – | 5 | – | 1 |
| Pomona | 1 | – | 1 | – | 2 | 1 | – | 5 | – | 2 |
| Occidental | 1 | – | 2 | – | 1 | 1 | – | 4 | – | 2 |
| Caltech | 1 | – | 3 | – | 0 | 2 | – | 4 | – | 0 |
$ – Conference champion

1946 Southern Intercollegiate Athletic Conference football standings
| | Conf. | | | | | Overall |
| Team | W | | L | | T | W | | L | | T |
|---|---|---|---|---|---|---|---|---|---|---|
| No. 8 Florida A&M $ | 6 | – | 0 | – | 0 | 6 | – | 4 | – | 1 |
| No. 5 Lane | 6 | – | 0 | – | 0 | 8 | – | 2 | – | 0 |
| No. 3 Tuskegee | 5 | – | 1 | – | 0 | 10 | – | 2 | – | 0 |
| No. 14 South Carolina State | 4 | – | 3 | – | 1 | 5 | – | 3 | – | 1 |
| No. 16 Morris Brown | 3 | – | 2 | – | 1 | 4 | – | 4 | – | 1 |
| No. 12 Xavier (LA) | 1 | – | 1 | – | 0 | 4 | – | 2 | – | 0 |
| Knoxville | 2 | – | 2 | – | 3 | 4 | – | 3 | – | 3 |
| No. 17 Benedict | 3 | – | 3 | – | 0 | 5 | – | 5 | – | 0 |
| No. 20 Alabama State | 3 | – | 4 | – | 1 | 4 | – | 4 | – | 1 |
| No. 18 Clark (GA) | 2 | – | 3 | – | 0 | 3 | – | 5 | – | 0 |
| No. 22 Morehouse | 1 | – | 4 | – | 3 | 1 | – | 4 | – | 3 |
| Alabama A&M | 2 | – | 4 | – | 1 | 3 | – | 4 | – | 1 |
| No. 15 Fisk | 0 | – | 3 | – | 1 | 3 | – | 4 | – | 1 |
| LeMoyne | 0 | – | 3 | – | 1 | 2 | – | 3 | – | 1 |
| Fort Valley State | 0 | – | 5 | – | 0 | 0 | – | 9 | – | 0 |
$ – Conference champion; Standings were based on Dickinson System ratings.; Rankings from Pittsburgh Courier Dickinson System

1946 Southwestern Athletic Conference football standings
| | Conf. | | | | | Overall |
| Team | W | | L | | T | W | | L | | T |
|---|---|---|---|---|---|---|---|---|---|---|
| No. 7 Southern $ | 5 | – | 1 | – | 0 | 9 | – | 2 | – | 1 |
| No. 12 Wiley | 4 | – | 2 | – | 0 | 6 | – | 3 | – | 1 |
| No. 6 Arkansas AM&N | 3 | – | 2 | – | 1 | 8 | – | 2 | – | 1 |
| No. 9 Prairie View A&M | 2 | – | 2 | – | 2 | 7 | – | 2 | – | 2 |
| No. 13 Texas College | 3 | – | 3 | – | 0 | 5 | – | 4 | – | 1 |
| No. 22 Langston | 2 | – | 4 | – | 0 | 2 | – | 6 | – | 1 |
| No. 23 Samuel Huston | 0 | – | 5 | – | 1 | 3 | – | 5 | – | 2 |
$ – Conference champion; Rankings from Pittsburgh Courier Dickinson System

1946 Texas Conference football standings
| | Conf. | | | | | Overall |
| Team | W | | L | | T | W | | L | | T |
|---|---|---|---|---|---|---|---|---|---|---|
| Abilene Christian + | 3 | – | 0 | – | 1 | 8 | – | 1 | – | 1 |
| Southwestern (TX) + | 3 | – | 0 | – | 1 | 5 | – | 4 | – | 1 |
| McMurry | 2 | – | 2 | – | 0 | 4 | – | 4 | – | 1 |
| Howard Payne | 1 | – | 3 | – | 0 | 2 | – | 5 | – | 2 |
| Austin | 1 | – | 3 | – | 0 | 2 | – | 6 | – | 2 |
+ – Conference co-champions

1946 Washington Intercollegiate Conference football standings
| | Conf. | | | | | Overall |
| Team | W | | L | | T | W | | L | | T |
|---|---|---|---|---|---|---|---|---|---|---|
| Central Washington $ | 5 | – | 0 | – | 0 | 6 | – | 2 | – | 0 |
| Eastern Washington | 3 | – | 1 | – | 1 | 4 | – | 3 | – | 1 |
| Pacific Lutheran | 2 | – | 2 | – | 1 | 3 | – | 3 | – | 1 |
| Western Washington | 2 | – | 3 | – | 0 | 4 | – | 4 | – | 0 |
| Saint Martin's | 1 | – | 4 | – | 0 | 2 | – | 4 | – | 0 |
| Whitworth | 1 | – | 4 | – | 0 | 1 | – | 7 | – | 0 |
$ – Conference champion

1946 West Virginia Intercollegiate Athletic Conference football standings
| | Conf. | | | | | Overall |
| Team | W | | L | | T | W | | L | | T |
|---|---|---|---|---|---|---|---|---|---|---|
| West Liberty State $ | 4 | – | 0 | – | 0 | 7 | – | 2 | – | 0 |
| Potomac State | 7 | – | 1 | – | 0 | 7 | – | 2 | – | 0 |
| West Virginia Tech | 5 | – | 1 | – | 0 | 6 | – | 2 | – | 0 |
| Fairmont State | 3 | – | 1 | – | 1 | 4 | – | 3 | – | 1 |
| West Virginia Wesleyan | 4 | – | 3 | – | 0 | 6 | – | 3 | – | 0 |
| Davis & Elkins | 2 | – | 3 | – | 1 | 3 | – | 5 | – | 2 |
| Morris Harvey | 2 | – | 3 | – | 0 | 2 | – | 5 | – | 0 |
| Concord | 1 | – | 3 | – | 2 | 1 | – | 5 | – | 2 |
| Glenville State | 1 | – | 5 | – | 2 | 1 | – | 5 | – | 2 |
| Shepherd | 1 | – | 5 | – | 0 | 1 | – | 5 | – | 0 |
| Salem | 0 | – | 5 | – | 0 | 0 | – | 8 | – | 0 |
| Marshall * | 2 | – | 0 | – | 0 | 2 | – | 7 | – | 1 |
| Bethany (WV) * | 0 | – | 2 | – | 0 | 1 | – | 7 | – | 0 |
$ – Conference champion; * – Did not qualify for conference standings Ties did not count in conference standings.

1946 Western New York Little Three Conference football standings
| | Conf. | | | | | Overall |
| Team | W | | L | | T | W | | L | | T |
|---|---|---|---|---|---|---|---|---|---|---|
| St. Bonaventure $ | 2 | – | 0 | – | 0 | 6 | – | 2 | – | 0 |
| Canisius | 1 | – | 1 | – | 0 | 4 | – | 3 | – | 1 |
| Niagara | 0 | – | 2 | – | 0 | 6 | – | 2 | – | 0 |
$ – Conference champion

1946 Wisconsin State Teachers College Conference football standings
| | Conf. | | | | | Overall |
| Team | W | | L | | T | W | | L | | T |
|---|---|---|---|---|---|---|---|---|---|---|
Northern Division
| Superior State x | 1 | – | 0 | – | 3 | 2 | – | 1 | – | 3 |
| River Falls State | 2 | – | 1 | – | 1 | 4 | – | 2 | – | 2 |
| Stout Institute | 1 | – | 1 | – | 2 | 2 | – | 2 | – | 2 |
| Eau Claire State | 1 | – | 2 | – | 1 | 3 | – | 2 | – | 2 |
| La Crosse State | 1 | – | 2 | – | 1 | 2 | – | 4 | – | 1 |
Southern Division
| Stevens Point State x | 3 | – | 1 | – | 0 | 3 | – | 2 | – | 1 |
| Milwaukee State x | 3 | – | 1 | – | 0 | 3 | – | 3 | – | 1 |
| Oshkosh State | 2 | – | 2 | – | 0 | 2 | – | 4 | – | 0 |
| Platteville State | 2 | – | 2 | – | 0 | 2 | – | 2 | – | 0 |
| Whitewater State | 0 | – | 4 | – | 0 | 0 | – | 6 | – | 0 |
x – Division champion/co-champions

=== Non-major independents ===
1946 Eastern non-major college football independents records
| | Conf. | | | Overall |
| Team | W | L | T | W | | L | | T |
|---|---|---|---|---|---|---|---|---|
| Thiel | | – | | 7 | – | 0 | – | 0 |
| Muhlenberg | | – | | 9 | – | 1 | – | 0 |
| Geneva | | – | | 7 | – | 1 | – | 0 |
| Dickinson | | – | | 6 | – | 1 | – | 0 |
| Alfred | | – | | 5 | – | 1 | – | 0 |
| Buffalo | | – | | 7 | – | 2 | – | 0 |
| Washington & Jefferson | | – | | 6 | – | 2 | – | 0 |
| Massachusetts State | | – | | 6 | – | 2 | – | 0 |
| Boston University | | – | | 5 | – | 2 | – | 1 |
| St. Lawrence | | – | | 5 | – | 2 | – | 0 |
| American International | | – | | 4 | – | 2 | – | 1 |
| Trinity (CT) | | – | | 4 | – | 2 | – | 0 |
| Swarthmore | | – | | 5 | – | 3 | – | 0 |
| Cortland State | | – | | 4 | – | 3 | – | 0 |
| Hofstra | | – | | 4 | – | 3 | – | 0 |
| Springfield | | – | | 4 | – | 4 | – | 0 |
| New York A&T | | – | | 3 | – | 3 | – | 0 |
| Northeastern | | – | | 3 | – | 3 | – | 0 |
| Scranton | | – | | 4 | – | 5 | – | 1 |
| Gettysburg | | – | | 4 | – | 5 | – | 0 |
| Drexel | | – | | 3 | – | 4 | – | 0 |
| Franklin & Marshall | | – | | 3 | – | 4 | – | 0 |
| Coast Guard | | – | | 3 | – | 5 | – | 0 |
| Tufts | | – | | 1 | – | 6 | – | 0 |
| CCNY | | – | | 1 | – | 7 | – | 0 |
| Carnegie Tech | | – | | 0 | – | 6 | – | 0 |

1946 Midwestern non-major college football independents records
| | Conf. | | | Overall |
| Team | W | L | T | W | | L | | T |
|---|---|---|---|---|---|---|---|---|
| St. Norbert | | – | | 8 | – | 0 | – | 0 |
| Youngstown | | – | | 7 | – | 1 | – | 0 |
| Bradley | | – | | 7 | – | 2 | – | 0 |
| Central Michigan | | – | | 6 | – | 2 | – | 0 |
| Defiance | | – | | 6 | – | 2 | – | 0 |
| Western Michigan | | – | | 5 | – | 2 | – | 1 |
| Miami (OH) | | – | | 7 | – | 3 | – | 0 |
| Dayton | | – | | 6 | – | 3 | – | 0 |
| Carroll (WI) | | – | | 4 | – | 2 | – | 1 |
| Bowling Green | | – | | 5 | – | 3 | – | 0 |
| Ohio Wesleyan | | – | | 5 | – | 4 | – | 1 |
| Michigan Tech | | – | | 3 | – | 2 | – | 0 |
| Northern Michigan | | – | | 3 | – | 2 | – | 1 |
| Michigan State Normal | | – | | 3 | – | 4 | – | 1 |
| Xavier | | – | | 3 | – | 7 | – | 0 |
| Detroit Tech | | – | | 1 | – | 6 | – | 1 |
| Valparaiso | | – | | 1 | – | 7 | – | 0 |
| Sterling | | – | | 1 | – | 8 | – | 0 |
| Haskell | | – | | 0 | – | 7 | – | 0 |

1946 Southern non-major college football independents records
| | Conf. | | | Overall |
| Team | W | L | T | W | | L | | T |
|---|---|---|---|---|---|---|---|---|
| Oklahoma City | | – | | 10 | – | 1 | – | 0 |
| Maryville (TN) | | – | | 9 | – | 1 | – | 0 |
| East Tennessee State | | – | | 7 | – | 1 | – | 0 |
| Millsaps | | – | | 5 | – | 1 | – | 0 |
| Middle Tennessee | | – | | 6 | – | 2 | – | 1 |
| Mississippi College | | – | | 6 | – | 2 | – | 0 |
| Trinity (TX) | | – | | 6 | – | 2 | – | 0 |
| Louisville Municipal | | – | | 5 | – | 2 | – | 0 |
| Fayetteville State | | – | | 7 | – | 3 | – | 0 |
| Mississippi Southern | | – | | 7 | – | 3 | – | 0 |
| East Carolina | | – | | 5 | – | 3 | – | 1 |
| Princess Anne | | – | | 5 | – | 3 | – | 1 |
| Austin Peay | | – | | 5 | – | 4 | – | 0 |
| Arkansas State | | – | | 4 | – | 3 | – | 3 |
| Sewanee | | – | | 4 | – | 3 | – | 0 |
| Livingston State | | – | | 4 | – | 3 | – | 0 |
| Tennessee Tech | | – | | 5 | – | 5 | – | 0 |
| Troy State | | – | | 4 | – | 4 | – | 0 |
| Grambling | | – | | 5 | – | 6 | – | 0 |
| Texas A&I | | – | | 2 | – | 7 | – | 0 |
| CCUNC | | – | | 2 | – | 4 | – | 0 |
| Tampa | | – | | 2 | – | 4 | – | 0 |
| Centre | | – | | 0 | – | 7 | – | 0 |

1946 Western non-major college football independents records
| | Conf. | | | Overall |
| Team | W | L | T | W | | L | | T |
|---|---|---|---|---|---|---|---|---|
| Southern Oregon | | – | | 8 | – | 0 | – | 0 |
| Pepperdine | | – | | 8 | – | 1 | – | 0 |
| Hawaii | | – | | 8 | – | 2 | – | 0 |
| Cal Poly | | – | | 6 | – | 2 | – | 1 |
| Loyola (CA) | | – | | 5 | – | 4 | – | 0 |
| Idaho Southern Branch | | – | | 4 | – | 3 | – | 1 |
| San Francisco State | | – | | 3 | – | 3 | – | 0 |
| Boise State | | – | | 3 | – | 4 | – | 2 |
| Eastern Oregon | | – | | 2 | – | 5 | – | 0 |
| La Verne | | – | | 0 | – | 5 | – | 0 |

== Award and honors ==
=== Heisman Trophy voting ===
The Heisman Trophy is given to the year's most outstanding player

| Player | School | Position | Total |
|---|---|---|---|
| Glenn Davis | Army | HB | 792 |
| Charley Trippi | Georgia | HB | 435 |
| Johnny Lujack | Notre Dame | QB | 379 |
| Doc Blanchard | Army | FB | 267 |
| Arnold Tucker | Army | QB | 257 |
| Herman Wedemeyer | St. Mary's (CA) | HB | 101 |
| Burr Baldwin | UCLA | E | 49 |
| Bobby Layne | Texas | QB | 45 |

== Statistical leaders ==
=== Team leaders ===
==== Total offense ====
| Rank | Team | Games played | Total plays | Yards gained | Yards per game |
|---|---|---|---|---|---|
| 1 | Notre Dame | 9 | 690 | 3972 | 441.3 |
| 2 | Georgia | 10 | 622 | 3946 | 394.6 |
| 3 | Nevada | 8 | 484 | 3114 | 389.3 |
| 4 | UCLA | 10 | 646 | 3779 | 377.9 |
| 5 | Michigan | 9 | 588 | 3122 | 366.9 |
| 6 | Hardin–Simmons | 10 | 642 | 3594 | 359.4 |
| 7 | Boston College | 9 | 598 | 3159 | 351.0 |
| 8 | Yale | 9 | 598 | 3095 | 343.9 |
| 9 | Utah | 8 | 531 | 2747 | 343.4 |
| 10 | Penn | 8 | 503 | 2720 | 340.0 |
| 11 | William & Mary | 10 | 601 | 3383 | 338.3 |
| 12 | Army | 10 | 608 | 3355 | 335.5 |
| 13 | Chattanooga | 10 | 592 | 3299 | 329.9 |
| 14 | Arizona | 10 | 674 | 3289 | 328.9 |
| 15 | Texas | 10 | 614 | 3281 | 328.1 |

==== Total defense ====
| Rank | Team | Games played | Total plays | Yards gained | Yards per game |
|---|---|---|---|---|---|
| 1 | Notre Dame | 9 | 465 | 1275 | 141.7 |
| 2 | Oklahoma | 10 | 539 | 1550 | 155.0 |
| 3 | Penn State | 8 | 454 | 1271 | 158.9 |
| 4 | NC State | 10 | 501 | 1621 | 162.1 |
| 5 | Rice | 10 | 547 | 1663 | 166.3 |
| 6 | Davidson | 9 | 432 | 1498 | 166.4 |
| 7 | Hardin–Simmons | 10 | 537 | 1673 | 167.3 |
| 8 | Mississippi State | 10 | 502 | 1695 | 169.5 |
| 9 | Harvard | 9 | 501 | 1536 | 1707 |
| 10 | Texas | 10 | 562 | 1760 | 176.0 |
| 11 | Boston College | 9 | 469 | 1591 | 176.8 |
| 12 | LSU | 10 | 520 | 1786 | 178.6 |
| 13 | Holy Cross | 9 | 467 | 1609 | 178.8 |
| 14 | Indiana | 9 | 459 | 1619 | 179.9 |
| 15 | William & Mary | 10 | 521 | 1816 | 181.6 |

==== Rushing offense ====
| Rank | Team | Games | Rushes | Yards gained | Yards per game |
|---|---|---|---|---|---|
| 1 | Notre Dame | 9 | 567 | 3061 | 340.1 |
| 2 | Hardin–Simmons | 10 | 540 | 2906 | 290.6 |
| 3 | Utah | 8 | 418 | 2108 | 263.5 |
| 4 | Detroit | 10 | 510 | 2632 | 263.2 |
| 5 | UCLA | 10 | 508 | 2598 | 259.8 |
| 6 | Oklahoma | 10 | 499 | 2354 | 235.4 |
| 7 | North Carolina | 10 | 452 | 2341 | 234.1 |
| 8 | Yale | 9 | 452 | 2100 | 233.3 |
| 9 | Penn | 8 | 378 | 1865 | 233.1 |
| 10 | Army | 10 | 454 | 2242 | 224.2 |
| 11 | Georgia | 10 | 416 | 2209 | 220.9 |
| 12 | Northwestern | 9 | 396 | 1958 | 217.6 |
| 13 | Mississippi State | 10 | 487 | 2163 | 216.3 |
| 14 | William & Mary | 10 | 455 | 2118 | 211.8 |
| 15 | Davidson | 9 | 428 | 1904 | 211.6 |

==== Rushing defense ====
| Rank | Team | Games | Rushes | Yards gained | Yards per game |
|---|---|---|---|---|---|
| 1 | Oklahoma | 10 | 359 | 580 | 58.0 |
| 2 | Mississippi State | 10 | 334 | 664 | 66.4 |
| 3 | Harvard | 9 | 330 | 679 | 75.4 |
| 4 | South Carolina | 8 | 292 | 637 | 79.6 |
| 5 | Notre Dame | 9 | 321 | 753 | 83.7 |

==== Passing offense ====
| Rank | Team | Games | Att. | Compl. | Int. | Pct. Compl. | Yards | Yds/Game | TD passes |
|---|---|---|---|---|---|---|---|---|---|
| 1 | Nevada | 8 | 156 | 68 | 14 | .436 | 1569 | 198.1 | 20 |
| 2 | Georgia | 10 | 206 | 112 | 9 | .544 | 1737 | 173.7 | 23 |
| 3 | Texas | 10 | 186 | 99 | 19 | .532 | 1569 | 156.9 | 12 |
| 4 | Oklahoma A&M | 11 | 252 | 107 | 25 | .425 | 1652 | 150.2 | 13 |
| 5 | Michigan | 9 | 162 | 73 | 22 | .451 | 1322 | 146.9 | 10 |
| 6 | Boston College | 9 | 175 | 82 | 14 | .469 | 1266 | 140.7 | 14 |
| 7 | Indiana | 9 | 185 | 95 | 15 | .514 | 1264 | 140.4 | 8 |
| 8 | Marquette | 9 | 189 | 90 | 19 | .476 | 1243 | 138.1 | 13 |
| 9 | Princeton | 8 | 167 | 68 | 14 | .407 | 1096 | 137.0 | 4 |
| 10 | Washington & Lee | 8 | 165 | 87 | 20 | .527 | 1085 | 135.6 | 12 |
| 11 | Arizona | 10 | 210 | 91 | 20 | .433 | 1321 | 132.1 | 11 |
| 12 | Purdue | 9 | 183 | 86 | 17 | .470 | 1182 | 131.3 | 7 |
| 13 | Clemson | 9 | 152 | 68 | 18 | .447 | 1181 | 131.2 | 8 |
| 14 | Wake Forest | 9 | 149 | 71 | 14 | .477 | 1151 | 127.9 | 8 |
| 15 | William & Mary | 10 | 146 | 77 | 15 | .527 | 1265 | 126.5 | 19 |

==== Passing defense ====
| Rank | Team | Games | Att. | Compl. | Pct. Compl. | Yards | Yds/Game |
|---|---|---|---|---|---|---|---|
| 1 | Holy Cross | 9 | 107 | 35 | .327 | 483 | 53.7 |
| 2 | West Texas State | 10 | 124 | 43 | .347 | 570 | 57.0 |
| 3 | Notre Dame | 9 | 144 | 54 | .375 | 522 | 58.0 |
| 4 | Indiana | 9 | 127 | 39 | .307 | 538 | 59.8 |
| 5 | Florida | 9 | 84 | 39 | .464 | 557 | 61.9 |

=== Individual leaders ===
==== Total offense ====
| Rank | Player | Team | Games | Plays | Rush Yds | Pass Yds | Total Yds | Avg Gain per Play |
|---|---|---|---|---|---|---|---|---|
| 1 | Travis Tidwell | Auburn | 10 | 339 | 772 | 943 | 1715 | 5.06 |
| 2 | Bobby Layne | Texas | 10 | 221 | 338 | 1122 | 1460 | 6.61 |
| 3 | Harry Gilmer | Alabama | 11 | 293 | 497 | 930 | 1427 | 4.98 |
| 4 | Charley Trippi | Georgia | 10 | 185 | 744 | 622 | 1366 | 7.38 |
| 5 | Bob Chappuis | Michigan | 9 | 180 | 531 | 734 | 1265 | 7.02 |
| 6 | Rudy Mobley | Hardin-Simmons | 10 | 227 | 1262 | 0 | 1262 | 5.56 |
| 7 | Herman Wedemeyer | St. Mary's | 8 | 204 | 625 | 595 | 1220 | 5.98 |
| 8 | Charlie Justice | North Carolina | 10 | 181 | 943 | 270 | 1213 | 6.70 |
| 9 | Bill Mackrides | Nevada | 8 | 142 | 70 | 1254 | 1184 | 8.34 |
| 10 | Gene "Choo Choo" Roberts | Chattanooga | 9 | 168 | 1113 | 9 | 1122 | 6.68 |
| 11 | Glenn Davis | Army | | | | | 1108 | 6.52 |
| 12 | Fred Enke | Arizona | | | | | 1069 | 5.66 |
| 13 | George Guerre | Michigan State | | | | | 1029 | 6.86 |
| 14 | Nick Sacrinty | Wake Forest | | | | | 1013 | 5.89 |
| 15 | Clark | Texas Mines | | | | | 967 | 4.48 |
| 16 | Clyde LeForce | Tulsa | | | | | 950 | 5.16 |
| 17 | Joe Golding | Oklahoma | | | | | 923 | 7.05 |
| 18 | Ben Raimondi | Indiana | | | | | 908 | 4.59 |
| 19 | Case | UCLA | | | | | 907 | 7.26 |
| 20 | Jackson | Yale | | | | | 888 | 6.00 |

==== Rushing ====
| Rank | Player | Team | Games | Rushes | Yds Gained | Yds Lost | Net Yds | Avg Gain per Play |
|---|---|---|---|---|---|---|---|---|
| 1 | Rudy Mobley | Hardin-Simmons | 10 | 227 | 1306 | 44 | 1262 | 5.56 |
| 2 | Gene "Choo Choo" Roberts | Chattanooga | 10 | 167 | 1147 | 34 | 1113 | 6.66 |
| 3 | Charlie Justice | North Carolina | 10 | 131 | 1024 | 81 | 943 | 7.20 |
| 4 | Joe Golding | Oklahoma | 10 | 126 | 960 | 58 | 902 | 7.16 |
| 5 | Levi Jackson | Yale | 9 | 134 | 851 | 45 | 806 | 6.01 |
| 6 | Roger Stephens | Cincinnati | 10 | 101 | 796 | 22 | 774 | 7.66 |
| 7 | Travis Tidwell | Auburn | 10 | 181 | 926 | 154 | 772 | 4.27 |
| 8 | Charley Trippi | Georgia | 10 | 115 | 846 | 102 | 744 | 6.47 |
| 9 | Hodges | Wichita | 10 | 152 | 775 | 42 | 733 | 4.82 |
| 10 | Glenn Davis | Army | 10 | 123 | 824 | 112 | 712 | 5.79 |
| 11 | Carl F. "Buddy" Russ | Rice | 10 | 130 | 710 | 20 | 690 | 5.31 |
| 12 | Lloyd Merriman | Stanford | 9 | 140 | 728 | 56 | 672 | 4.80 |
| 13 | George Guerre | Michigan State | 10 | 90 | 699 | 66 | 633 | 7.03 |
| 14 | Herman Wedemeyer | Saint Mary's | 8 | 104 | 704 | 79 | 625 | 6.01 |
| 15 | Joseph Rogers | Villanova | 10 | 90 | 669 | 49 | 620 | 6.89 |
| 16 | Doc Blanchard | Army | 10 | 120 | 633 | 20 | 613 | 5.11 |
| 17 | Walter Kretz | Cornell | 9 | 89 | 613 | 11 | 602 | 6.76 |
| 18 | Carpenter | Ohio State | 9 | 141 | 612 | 23 | 589 | 4.18 |
| 19 | Forrest Hall | San Francisco | 9 | 89 | 615 | 36 | 579 | 6.51 |
| 20 | Barney Hafen | Utah | 9 | 132 | 609 | 32 | 577 | 4.37 |

==== Passing ====
| Rank | Player | Team | Games | Att. | Compl. | Int. | Pct. Compl. | Yds. | TDs |
|---|---|---|---|---|---|---|---|---|---|
| 1 | Travis Tidwell | Auburn | 10 | 158 | 79 | 10 | .500 | 943 | 5 |
| 2 | Bobby Layne | Texas | 10 | 144 | 77 | 14 | .550 | 1122 | 6 |
| 3 | Ben Raimondi | Indiana | 9 | 138 | 74 | 8 | .536 | 956 | 7 |
| 4 | Harry Gilmer | Alabama | 11 | 160 | 69 | 10 | .431 | 930 | 5 |
| 5 | Bobby Thomason | VMI | 10 | 126 | 66 | 4 | .524 | 833 | 10 |
| 6 | Charlie Conerly | Ole Miss | 9 | 124 | 64 | 13 | .516 | 641 | 3 |
| 7 | Clark | Texas Mines | 8 | 107 | 61 | 8 | .570 | 604 | 6 |
| 8 | Clyde LeForce | Tulsa | 10 | 125 | 61 | 7 | .488 | 807 | 7 |
| 9 | Bob DeMoss | Purdue | 8 | 122 | 59 | 9 | .484 | 814 | 6 |
| 10 | Working | Washington & Lee | 7 | 108 | 56 | 14 | .519 | 741 | 8 |
| 11 | Bill Mackrides | Nevada | 8 | 115 | 56 | 7 | .487 | 1254 | 17 |
| 12 | Nick Sacrinty | Wake Forest | 9 | 109 | 51 | 12 | .468 | 822 | 6 |
| 13 | Olsen | BYU | 8 | 100 | 50 | 10 | .500 | 719 | 2 |
| 14 | Frank Payne | SMU | 10 | 107 | 50 | 11 | .467 | 580 | 4 |
| 15 | Johnny Lujack | Notre Dame | 9 | 100 | 49 | 8 | .490 | 778 | 6 |
| 16 | Furse | Yale | 9 | 100 | 49 | 6 | .490 | 735 | 8 |
| 17 | John Rauch | Georgia | 10 | 87 | 48 | 4 | .552 | 779 | 14 |
| 18 | John Burns | Cornell | 9 | 105 | 48 | 8 | .457 | 624 | 3 |
| 19 | Tommy Mont | Maryland | 9 | 92 | 45 | 6 | .489 | 410 | 3 |
| 20 | Y. A. Tittle | LSU | 10 | 95 | 45 | 8 | .474 | 781 | 11 |

==== Receiving ====
| Rank | Player | Team | Games | Receptions | Receiving Yards |
|---|---|---|---|---|---|
| 1 | Neill Armstrong | Oklahoma A&M | 10 | 32 | 479 |
| 1 | Montgomery | Arizona (Tempe) | 11 | 32 | 399 |
| 3 | Broughton Williams | Florida | 8 | 29 | 490 |
| 3 | Red O'Quinn | Wake Forest | 9 | 29 | 441 |
| 5 | Barney Poole | Ole Miss | 9 | 28 | 277 |

==== Scoring ====
The following list of scoring leaders is taken from the NCAA's Official Football Guide for 1947 and includes both major and minor college players. Gene "Choo-Choo" Roberts ranked third overall and first among major college players.

| Rank | Player | Team | TD | PAT | FG | Pts |
|---|---|---|---|---|---|---|
| 1 | Joe Carter | Florida N&I | 21 | 26 | 0 | 152 |
| 2 | Andy Victor | Oklahoma City | 14 | 40 | 0 | 124 |
| 3 | Gene "Choo-Choo" Roberts | Chattanooga | 18 | 9 | 0 | 117 |
| 4 | Rudy Mobley | Hardin–Simmons | 16 | 0 | 0 | 96 |
| 5 | Jack Crider | Muhlenberg | 15 | 0 | 0 | 90 |
| 6 | Forrest Hall | San Francisco | 13 | 9 | 0 | 87 |
| 7 (tie) | Charley Trippi | Georgia | 14 | 0 | 0 | 84 |
| 7 (tie) | Baker | Missouri Valley | 14 | 0 | 0 | 84 |
| 7 (tie) | Dan Roskos | East Stroudsburg State | 14 | 0 | 0 | 84 |
| 7 (tie) | Phillipi | Southern | 14 | 0 | 0 | 84 |
| 11 (tie) | Art Hering | Rutgers | 12 | 8 | 0 | 80 |
| 11 (tie) | Dixon | Abilene Christian | 13 | 3 | 0 | 80 |
| 11 (tie) | Johnny Hickman | San Angelo | 12 | 8 | 0 | 80 |
| 14 | Glenn Davis | Army | 13 | 0 | 0 | 78 |
| 15 (tie) | Larry Bruno | Geneva | 12 | 2 | 0 | 74 |
| 15 (tie) | Spoon | Southwestern Kansas | 12 | 2 | 0 | 74 |
| 17 (tie) | Charlie Justice | North Carolina | 12 | 0 | 0 | 72 |
| 17 (tie) | Young | Hillsdale | 12 | 0 | 0 | 72 |
| 17 (tie) | Brady | Ohio | 12 | 0 | 0 | 72 |
| 17 (tie) | Ward | Hillsdale | 12 | 0 | 0 | 72 |
| 17 (tie) | Washington | Tennessee A&I | 12 | 0 | 0 | 72 |
| 22 | Clyde LeForce | Tulsa | 5 | 34 | 1 | 67 |
| 23 (tie) | Jack Cloud | William & Mary | 11 | 0 | 0 | 66 |
| 23 (tie) | Pudge Camarata | Iowa Teachers | 11 | 0 | 0 | 66 |
| 23 (tie) | Lingenfelder | Missouri Valley | 11 | 0 | 0 | 66 |
| 23 (tie) | Preston | Missouri Valley | 6 | 30 | 0 | 66 |
| 23 (tie) | Hughes | Ottawa | 11 | 0 | 0 | 66 |
| 23 (tie) | Carl Giordana | Lawrence | 11 | 0 | 0 | 66 |
| 23 (tie) | Anthony Georgiana | Catawba | 11 | 0 | 0 | 66 |

== Rules Committee ==
- Earl Krieger, secretary
- W. J. Bingham (Harvard), chairman
- Amos Alonzo Stagg (Pacific), life member
- William Alexander (Georgia Tech), member-at-large
- Tuss McLaughry (Dartmouth), 1st District
- Biff Jones (Army), 2nd District
- Wallace Wade (Duke), 3rd District
- Fritz Crisler (Michigan), 4th District
- Ernest C. Quigley (Kansas), 5th District
- Dana X. Bible (Texas), 6th District
- Harry W. Hughes (Colorado A&M), 7th District
- Willis O. Hunter (USC), 8th District
