= 1946 Troy State Red Wave football team =

American college football season

1946 Troy State Red Wave football
- Conference: Alabama Intercollegiate Conference
- Record: 3–4 (3–1 AIC)
- Head coach: Albert Choate (7th season)
- Home stadium: Pace Field

1946 Alabama Intercollegiate Conference football standings
	Conf.					Overall
Team	W		L		T	W		L		T
Livingston State $	2	–	0	–	0	5	–	2	–	0
Troy State	3	–	1	–	0	3	–	4	–	0
Jacksonville State	1	–	1	–	1	3	–	5	–	1
Marion	1	–	2	–	0	2	–	2	–	0
St. Bernard	0	–	3	–	1	1	–	6	–	1
$ – Conference champion

The 1946 Troy State Red Wave football team represented Troy State Teachers College (now known as Troy University) as a member of the Alabama Intercollegiate Conference (AIC) during the 1946 college football season. Led by Albert Choate in his seventh and final season as head coach, the Red Wave compiled an overall record of 3–4, with a mark of 3–1 in conference play.

== Schedule ==
Date	Opponent	Site	Result	Attendance	Source
October 4	at Marion	Marion, AL	W 13–0		
October 10	at Stetson*	DeLand Municipal Stadium; DeLand, FL	L 12–15		
October 17	at Jacksonville State	Memorial Stadium; Anniston, AL (rivalry)	W 12–0	2,500	
October 26	Livingston State	Pace Field; Troy, AL	L 0–13	2,000	
November 2	St. Bernard	Pace Field; Troy, AL	W 20–13		
November 8	at Southwestern Louisiana*	McNaspy Stadium; Lafayette, LA	L 0–64		
November 15	at Middle Tennessee*	Horace Jones Field; Murfreesboro, TN (rivalry)	L 0–12		
*Non-conference game
