= 1946 college football rankings =

- Season: 1946
- Bowl season: 1946–47 bowl games
- End of season champions: Notre Dame

One human poll comprised the 1946 college football rankings. Unlike most sports, college football's governing body, the NCAA, does not bestow a national championship, instead that title is bestowed by one or more different polling agencies. There are two main weekly polls that begin in the preseason—the AP Poll and the Coaches' Poll. The Coaches' Poll began operation in 1950; in addition, the AP Poll did not begin conducting preseason polls until that same year.

== Legend ==
	Increase in ranking
	Decrease in ranking
	Not ranked previous week
	National champion
(#–#)	Win–loss record
(Italics)	Number of first place votes
т	Tied with team above or below also with this symbol

== AP Poll ==
The final AP Poll was released on December 2, at the end of the 1946 regular season, weeks before the major bowls. The AP would not release a post-bowl season final poll regularly until 1968.

	Week 1 Oct 7	Week 2 Oct 14	Week 3 Oct 21	Week 4 Oct 28	Week 5 Nov 4	Week 6 Nov 11	Week 7 Nov 18	Week 8 Nov 25	Week 9 (Final) Dec 2	
1.	Texas (3–0) (69 1/3)	Army (4–0) (63)	Army (5–0) (112 1/4)	Army (6–0) (104)	Army (7–0) (64)	Army (7–0–1) (75)	Army (8–0–1) (58)	Army (8–0–1) (72)	Notre Dame (8–0–1) (104 1/2)	1.
2.	Army (3–0) (21 1/3)	Notre Dame (2–0) (31)	Notre Dame (3–0) (21 1/4)	Notre Dame (4–0) (61)	Notre Dame (5–0) (51)	Notre Dame (5–0–1) (49)	Notre Dame (6–0–1) (16)	Notre Dame (7–0–1) (38)	Army (9–0–1) (52 1/2)	2.
3.	Notre Dame (1–0) (15 1/3)	Texas (4–0) (38)	Texas (5–0) (13 1/4)	Penn (4–0) (4)	Georgia (6–0) (6)	Georgia (7–0) (12)	Georgia (8–0) (8)	Georgia (9–0) (5)	Georgia (10–0) (23)	3.
4.	Michigan (2–0)	UCLA (3–0) (5)	Tennessee (4–0) (6)	UCLA (5–0) (1)	UCLA (6–0) (3)	UCLA (7–0) (7)	UCLA (8–0) (5)	UCLA (9–0) (5)	UCLA (10–0) (2)	4.
5.	UCLA (2–0) (1)	Michigan (2–1)	UCLA (4–0) (2)	Georgia (5–0) (1)	Rice (5–1)	Penn (5–1)	Illinois (6–2)	Illinois (7–2)	Illinois (7–2)	5.
6.	Alabama (3–0)	Penn (2–0) (2)	Penn (3–0) (1/4)	Northwestern (4–0–1)	Texas (6–1)	Texas (7–1)	Georgia Tech (7–1)	Michigan (6–2–1)	Michigan (6–2–1)	6.
7.	Penn (1–0) (1)	Alabama (4–0)	Georgia (4–0)	Texas (5–1)	Tennessee (5–1)	Georgia Tech (6–1)	Tennessee (7–1)	Georgia Tech (8–1) (1)	Tennessee (9–1)	7.
8.	Georgia (2–0) т	Georgia (3–0)	Michigan (2–1–1) т	Rice (4–1)	Georgia Tech (5–1)	Tennessee (6–1)	Michigan (5–2–1)	Tennessee (8–1) (1)	LSU (9–1)	8.
9.	Tennessee (2–0) т	Tennessee (3–0)	Northwestern (3–0–1) т	North Carolina (4–0–1)	Penn (4–1)	Illinois (5–2)	LSU (7–1)	LSU (8–1)	North Carolina (8–1–1)	9.
10.	Northwestern (2–0)	Northwestern (3–0)	North Carolina (3–0–1)	Tennessee (4–1)	Illinois (5–2)	Michigan (4–2–1)	USC (5–2)	Arkansas (6–2–1)	Rice (8–2)	10.
11.	Columbia (2–0)	Columbia (3–0)	Alabama (4–1)	Illinois (4–2)	Michigan (3–2–1)	LSU (6–1)	Arkansas (6–2–1)	North Carolina (7–1–1)	Georgia Tech (8–2)	11.
12.	Illinois (2–1)	LSU (3–0)	NC State (4–0)	Wake Forest (4–1)	Ohio State (3–1–2)	USC (5–2)	Rice (6–2)	Yale (7–1–1)	Yale (7–1–1)	12.
13.	LSU (2–0)	Oklahoma (1–2)	Duke (2–2)	Michigan (2–2–1)	Wake Forest (5–1)	Ohio State (4–1–2)	Penn (5–2)	Rice (7–2)	Penn (6–2)	13.
14.	Ohio State (1–0)	Arkansas (3–0–1)	Oklahoma (2–2)	Oklahoma (3–2)	USC (4–2)	Rice (5–2)	North Carolina (6–1–1)	Penn (5–2)	Oklahoma (7–3)	14.
15.	Yale (2–0)	North Carolina (2–0–1)	Georgia Tech (3–1)	Alabama (5–1)	Wisconsin (4–2)	North Carolina (5–1–1)	Yale (6–1–1)	Delaware (9–0) (2)	Texas (8–2) (1)	15.
16.	St. Mary's (2–0)	Rice (2–1)	Rice (3–1)	Georgia Tech (4–1)	Oklahoma (4–2)	Iowa (5–3)	Delaware (8–0)	USC (5–3)	Arkansas (6–3–1)	16.
17.	Stanford (2–0)	Duke (1–2)	Iowa (4–1)	Harvard (5–0) (1)	North Carolina (4–1–1) т	Arkansas (5–2–1)	Texas (7–2)	Boston College (6–2) т	Tulsa (9–1)	17.
18.	Arkansas (2–0–1)	Indiana (2–2)	William & Mary (4–1)	Wisconsin (3–2)	Northwestern (4–1–1) т	Yale (5–1–1)	Oklahoma (6–2)	Oklahoma (6–3) т	NC State (8–2)	18.
19.	Kentucky (3–0) т	William & Mary (3–1)	Oregon (3–0–1)	Duke (2–3)	LSU (5–1)	Holy Cross (3–4)	Muhlenberg (8–0) т	Mississippi State (8–1)	Delaware (9–0)	19.
20.	NC State (2–0) т	Tulsa (4–0) т; Wisconsin (3–1) т	Harvard (4–0)	Indiana (3–3)	NC State (5–1)	Duke (3–4)	Tulsa (8–1) т	Texas (7–2)	Indiana (6–3) (1)	20.
	Week 1 Oct 7	Week 2 Oct 14	Week 3 Oct 21	Week 4 Oct 28	Week 5 Nov 4	Week 6 Nov 11	Week 7 Nov 18	Week 8 Nov 25	Week 9 (Final) Dec 2	
		Dropped: Illinois; Kentucky; NC State; Ohio State; St. Mary's; Stanford; Yale	Dropped: Arkansas; Columbia; Indiana; LSU; Tulsa; Wisconsin	Dropped: Iowa; NC State; Oregon; William & Mary	Dropped: Alabama; Duke; Harvard; Indiana	Dropped: NC State; Northwestern; Oklahoma; Wake Forest; Wisconsin	Dropped: Duke; Holy Cross; Iowa; Ohio State	Dropped: Muhlenberg; Tulsa	Dropped: USC; Mississippi State; Boston College	

== Litkenhous Ratings ==
The final Litkenhous Ratings released in December 1946 provided numerical rankings to more than 500 college and military football programs. The top 100 ranked teams were:

1. Notre Dame (8–0–1)
2. Army (9–0–1)
3. Michigan (6–2–1)
4. Georgia (11–0)
5. Rice (9–2)
6. Illinois (8–2)
7. Texas (8–2)
8. Penn (6–2)
9. LSU (9–1–1)
10. Mississippi State (8–2)
11. Georgia Tech (9–2)
12. Tennessee (9–2)
13. North Carolina (8–2–1)
14. Kentucky (7–3)
15. Oklahoma (8–3)
16. UCLA (10–1)
17. Northwestern (4–4–1)
18. Iowa (5–4)
19. Indiana (6–3)
20. Duke (4–5)
21. Yale (7–1–1)
22. Alabama (7–4)
23. Tulsa (9–1)
24. Penn State (6–2)
25. Ohio State (4–3–2)
26. Vanderbilt (5–4)
27. Minnesota (5–4)
28. Arkansas (6–3–2)
29. Wisconsin (4–5)
30. William & Mary (8–2)
31. Oklahoma City (10–1)
32. Navy (1–8)
33. Tulane (3–7)
34. Wake Forest (6–3)
35. NC State (8–3)
36. Columbia (6–3)
37. USC (6–4)
38. Cornell (5–3–1)
39. Miami (FL) (8–2)
40. Texas A&M (4–6)
41. SMU (4–5–1)
42. Cincinnati (9–2)
43. Pittsburgh (3–5–1)
44. Boston College (6–3)
45. Ole Miss (2–7)
46. Harvard (7–2)
47. Villanova (6–4)
48. Purdue (2–6–1)
49. Rutgers (7–2)
50. Miami (OH) (7–3)
51. Michigan State (5–3–1)
52. TCU (2–7–1)
53. Colgate (4–4)
54. Stanford (6–3–1)
55. Holy Cross
56. Hardin-Simmons (11–0)
57. Princeton (3–5)
58. Texas Tech
59. Nevada (7–2)
60. Oklahoma A&M (3–7–1)
61. Detroit (6–4)
62. Oregon State (7–1–1)
63. Syracuse (4–5)
64. Mississippi Southern (7–3)
65. Chattanooga (5–5)
66. Temple (2–4–2)
67. Nebraska
68. Marquette (4–5)
69. Auburn (4–6)
70. Washington (5–4)
71. West Virginia (5–5)
72. Saint Mary's (6–3)
73. Ohio (6–3)
74. Virginia (4–4–1)
75. Baylor (1–8)
76. Kansas (7–2–1)
77. Missouri (5–4–1)
78. Louisiana Tech (7–3)
79. California (2–7)
80. Clemson (4–5)
81. Dartmouth
82. Delaware (10–0)
83. Virginia Tech (3–4–3)
84. Florida (0–9)
85. Iowa State Teachers (4–1–2)
86. San Francisco (3–6)
87. Southwestern Louisiana (6–4)
88. St. Bonaventure (6–2)
89. Washington State (1–6–1)
90. Central Michigan (6–2)
91. Utah State (7–2–1)
92. Northwestern Louisiana
93. Utah (8–3)
94. Arizona (4–4–2)
95. Georgetown (5–3)
96. Dayton (6–3)
97. Western Michigan (5–2–1)
98. Bowling Green (5–3)
99. Oregon (4–4–1)
100. Southwestern (TX) (5–4–1)
101. Brown (3–5–1)
102. Muhlenberg (9–1)
103. George Washington (4–3)
104. Missouri Valley (10–0)
105. Richmond (6–2–2)
106. Baldwin-Wallace (4–2–2)
107. VMI (4–5–1)
108. Maryland (3–6)
109. San Jose State (9–1–1)
110. South Carolina (2–4–3)
111. Washington & Lee (2–6)
112. Denver (5–5–1)
113. Wichita (5–5)
114. Boston University (5–2–1)
115. Hawaii (8–2)
116. Saint Louis (4–6)
117. Bucknell (3–6)
118. Minot
119. Otterbein (7–1)
120. Santa Clara (2–5–1)
121. Morehead (KY)
122. Canisius (4–3–1)
123. New Hampshire (6–1–1)
124. California (PA) (9–0)
125. Southwestern Louisiana (6–4)
126. Bradley (7–2)
127. Connecticut (4–3–1)
128. Toledo (6–2–2)
129. Western Reserve (4–3–2)
130. Ohio Wesleyan
131. Youngstown (7–1)
132. Abilene Christian (8–1–1)
133. Butler (7–1)
134. Catawba (10–2)
135. St. Norbert (8–0)
136. Murray (KY)
137. Wesleyan (7–0)
138. Clarkson
139. Eastern Kentucky
140. Colorado (5–4–1)
141. Kent State (6–2)
142. Davidson (4–5)
143. Niagara (6–2)
144. Furman (2–8)
145. Lawrence (6–1–1)
146. Cape Girardeau
147. Wayne (4–5)
148. Santa Monica
149. Compton
150. Ottawa (7–1–1)

== Pittsburgh Courier ==
The Pittsburgh Courier, a leading African American newspaper, ranked the top 1946 teams from historically black colleges and universities using the Dickinson System in an era when college football was largely segregated. The rankings were published on December 7.

1. Tennessee A&I (10–1)
2. Morgan State (8–0)
3. Tuskegee (10–2)
4. Wilberforce (5–2–2)
5. Lane (8–2)
6. Arkansas A&M (8–2–1)
7. Southern (9–2–1), Lincoln (MO) (5–3–1)
8. Florida A&M (6–4–1)
9. Prairie View A&M (6–2–2)
10. West Virginia State (6–3–1)
11. Allen (8–2)
12. Bethune-Cookman (8–1–1), Wiley (6–3–1), Xavier (LA) (4–2)
13. Texas College (5–4–1)
14. South Carolina State (5–3–1)
15. Fisk (4–2–1)
16. North Carolina College (7–3), Howard (6–3), Morris Brown (4–3–1), Louisville Municipal (5–2)
17. Benedict (5–4)
18. Clark (3–4), North Carolina A&T (3–5), Bluefield State (4–4–1), Houston College (2–3–2)
19. Shaw (5–3–1), Kentucky State (5–4)
20. Lincoln (PA) (5–3), Alabama State (4–4–1)
21. LeMoyne–Owen (3–4)
22. Morehouse (1–3–3), Hampton (4–4), Virginia Union (3–4–1), Langston (2–6)
23. Alabama A&M (3–4–1), Huston (2–4–2)
24. Tillotson (2–5)
25. Bishop (3–2–1), Dillard (3–3)
26. Grambling (6–6)

== See also ==
- 1946 College Football All-America Team
