= 1946 Presbyterian Blue Hose football team =

American college football season

1946 Presbyterian Blue Hose football

Little Four champion
- Conference: South Carolina Little Four
- Record: 7–2 (3–0 Little Four)
- Head coach: Lonnie McMillian (6th season)
- Captain: Game captains
- Home stadium: Old Bailey Stadium

The 1946 Presbyterian Blue Hose football team was an American football team that represented Presbyterian College as a member of the South Carolina Little Four during the 1946 college football season. In their sixth season under head coach Lonnie McMillian, the Blue Hose compiled a 7–2 record (3–0 against Little Four teams), won the Little Four championship, and outscored opponents by a total of 154 to 99. After losing the first two games of the season, Presbyterian won seven consecutive games to close the season.

Presbyterian's senior quarterback Hank Caver received first-team honors on the 1946 Little All-America college football team. Caver ranked second among small-college players with 790 passing yards (though he also led the country with 13 passes intercepted). He led a T-formation offense that was nicknamed "Operation Moon."

Three Presbyterian players received honors from the Associated Press on the 1946 All-South Carolina team: Caver on the first team; back Herbert Rollins on the second team; and end Dick Kaleel on the third team.

The team played its home games at the original Bailey Stadium in Clinton, South Carolina.

== Schedule ==
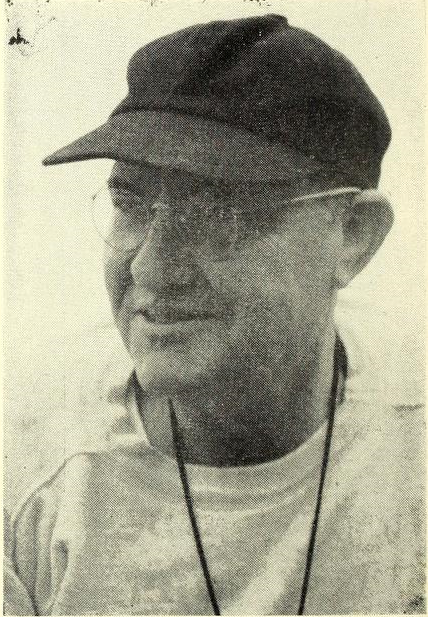
Head coach Lonnie S. McMillan

Date	Opponent	Site	Result	Attendance	Source
September 21	at Clemson*	Memorial Stadium; Clemson, SC	L 0–39	12,000	
September 27	at The Citadel*	Johnson Hagood Stadium; Charleston, SC	L 6–7		
October 5	at Sewanee*	Sewanee, TN	W 12–7		
October 12	Erskine	Bailey Stadium; Clinton, SC	W 37–0		
October 25	Stetson*	Bailey Stadium; Clinton, SC	W 25–0		
November 2	at Catawba*	Shuford Field; Salisbury, NC	W 13–12		
November 9	at Wofford	Spartanburg, SC	W 33–14	2,500	
November 23	Appalachian State*	Bailey Stadium; Clinton, SC	W 14–7		
November 28	Newberry	Bailey Stadium; Clinton, SC	W 14–13		
*Non-conference game
