= 1946 South Carolina Gamecocks football team =

American college football season

1946 South Carolina Gamecocks football
- Conference: Southern Conference
- Record: 5–3 (4–2 SoCon)
- Head coach: Rex Enright (6th season)
- Captain: Earl Dunham
- Home stadium: Carolina Municipal Stadium

1946 Southern Conference football standings
| | Conf. | | | | | Overall |
| Team | W | | L | | T | W | | L | | T |
|---|---|---|---|---|---|---|---|---|---|---|
| No. 9 North Carolina $ | 4 | – | 0 | – | 1 | 8 | – | 2 | – | 1 |
| William & Mary | 7 | – | 1 | – | 0 | 8 | – | 2 | – | 0 |
| No. 18 NC State | 6 | – | 1 | – | 0 | 8 | – | 3 | – | 0 |
| South Carolina | 4 | – | 2 | – | 0 | 5 | – | 3 | – | 0 |
| Duke | 3 | – | 2 | – | 0 | 4 | – | 5 | – | 0 |
| Richmond | 3 | – | 2 | – | 2 | 6 | – | 2 | – | 2 |
| VPI | 3 | – | 3 | – | 2 | 3 | – | 4 | – | 3 |
| VMI | 2 | – | 3 | – | 1 | 4 | – | 5 | – | 1 |
| George Washington | 1 | – | 1 | – | 0 | 4 | – | 3 | – | 0 |
| Clemson | 2 | – | 3 | – | 0 | 4 | – | 5 | – | 0 |
| Wake Forest | 2 | – | 3 | – | 0 | 6 | – | 3 | – | 0 |
| Maryland | 2 | – | 5 | – | 0 | 3 | – | 6 | – | 0 |
| Furman | 1 | – | 4 | – | 0 | 2 | – | 8 | – | 0 |
| Washington and Lee | 1 | – | 4 | – | 0 | 2 | – | 6 | – | 0 |
| The Citadel | 1 | – | 5 | – | 0 | 3 | – | 5 | – | 0 |
| Davidson | 1 | – | 5 | – | 0 | 4 | – | 5 | – | 0 |
$ – Conference champion; Rankings from AP Poll

The 1946 South Carolina Gamecocks football team was an American football team that represented the University of South Carolina as a member of the Southern Conference (SoCon) during the 1946 college football season. In their sixth season under head coach Rex Enright, the Gamecocks finished the season with an overall record of 5–3, including a mark of 4–2 in conference play, placing fourth in the SoCon. Throughout the season, the team was outscored by a total of 133 to 107.

The team ranked fourth nationally in rushing defense, allowing an average of only 79.6 rushing yards per game. The Gamecocks struggled offensively, ranking 79th out of 120 major-college teams in scoring offense with an average of 13.4 point per game.

Center Bryant Meeks received first-team honors from the Associated Press (AP) and United Press (UP) on the 1946 All-Southern Conference football team. He also received second-team honors from the AP on the 1946 All-America college football team. Other Gamecocks receiving all-conference honor were backs Harold Hagan (AP-3, UP-2) and Earl Dunham (UP-3) and tackle Dom Fusci (AP-3, UP-2).

== Schedule ==
| Date | Opponent | Site | Result | Attendance | Source |
|---|---|---|---|---|---|
| September 28 | Newberry* | Fair Grounds Stadium; Columbia, SC | W 21–0 | 11,000 | |
| October 5 | Alabama* | Carolina Stadium; Columbia, SC | L 6–14 | 20,000 | |
| October 11 | at Furman | Sirrine Stadium; Greenville, SC | W 14–7 | | |
| October 24 | Clemson | Carolina Stadium; Columbia, SC (rivalry) | W 26–14 | | |
| November 1 | vs. The Citadel | County Fairgrounds; Orangeburg, SC | W 19–7 | 10,000 | |
| November 9 | at Maryland | Byrd Stadium; College Park, MD | W 21–17 | | |
| November 16 | No. 20 Duke | Carolina Stadium; Columbia, SC | L 0–39 | 18,000 | |
| November 28 | vs. Wake Forest | American Legion Memorial Stadium; Charlotte, NC | L 0–35 | | |
*Non-conference game; Rankings from AP Poll released prior to the game

== After the season ==
The 1947 NFL draft was held on December 16, 1946. The following Gamecocks players were selected.

| Round | Pick | Player | Position | NFL club |
|---|---|---|---|---|
| 7 | 49 | Bryant Meeks | Center | Pittsburgh Steelers |
| 9 | 66 | Kale Alexander | Tackle | Detroit Lions |
| 28 | 263 | Jim Hunnicutt | Guard | Los Angeles Rams |
| 29 | 274 | Claude Harrison | Back | New York Giants |
| 31 | 291 | James Atwell | Back | Los Angeles Rams |
