= 1946 Chattanooga Moccasins football team =

American college football season

1946 Chattanooga Moccasins football
- Conference: Independent
- Record: 5–5
- Head coach: Scrappy Moore (16th season)
- Captain: Gene Roberts
- Home stadium: Chamberlain Field

1946 Southern major college football independents records
	Conf.			Overall
Team	W	L	T	W		L		T
Miami (FL)		–		8	–	2	–	0
Georgetown		–		5	–	3	–	0
Virginia		–		4	–	4	–	1
Chattanooga		–		5	–	5	–	0
West Virginia		–		5	–	5	–	0
Navy		–		1	–	8	–	0

The 1946 Chattanooga Moccasins football team was an American football team that represented the University of Chattanooga (now known as the University of Tennessee at Chattanooga) as an independent during the 1946 college football season. In its 16th year under head coach Scrappy Moore, the team compiled a 5–5 record.

The Moccasins ranked 13th nationally in total offense with an average of 329.9 yards per game. Back Gene "Choo Choo" Roberts ranked second in the country with 1,113 rushing yards. Roberts was also the leading scorer among major college players with 117 points scored on 18 touchdowns and nine extra points.

Chattanooga was ranked at No. 65 in the final Litkenhous Difference by Score System rankings for 1946.

== Schedule ==
Date	Opponent	Site	Result	Attendance	Source
September 29	at Mississippi State	Scott Field; Starkville, MS	L 7–41	12,000	
October 4	Tennessee Tech	Chamberlain Field; Chattanooga, TN	W 37–6	5,700	
October 12	at No. 8 Tennessee	Shields–Watkins Field; Knoxville, TN	L 7–47	22,000	
October 18	Murray State	Chamberlain Field; Chattanooga, TN	W 34–6		
October 25	at Miami (FL)	Burdine Stadium; Miami, FL	L 13–33	26,011	
November 1	No. 12 Wake Forest	Chamberlain Field; Chattanooga, TN	L 14–32	9,000	
November 9	at Dayton	UD Stadium; Dayton, OH	W 34–7	5,000	
November 15	Newberry	Chamberlain Field; Chattanooga, TN	W 47–7	5,000	
November 23	No. 3 Georgia^{†}	Chamberlain Field; Chattanooga, TN	L 27–48	10,000	
November 28	Rollins	Chamberlain Field; Chattanooga, TN	W 34–6		
^{†}Homecoming; Rankings from AP Poll released prior to the game
