= 1946 West Virginia Mountaineers football team =

American college football season

1946 West Virginia Mountaineers football
- Conference: Independent
- Record: 5–5
- Head coach: Bill Kern (4th season)
- Captain: Victor Peelish
- Home stadium: Mountaineer Field

1946 Southern major college football independents records
	Conf.			Overall
Team	W	L	T	W		L		T
Miami (FL)		–		8	–	2	–	0
Georgetown		–		5	–	3	–	0
Virginia		–		4	–	4	–	1
Chattanooga		–		5	–	5	–	0
West Virginia		–		5	–	5	–	0
Navy		–		1	–	8	–	0

The 1946 West Virginia Mountaineers football team was an American football team that represented West Virginia University as an independent during the 1946 college football season. In its fourth non-consecutive season under head coach Bill Kern, the team compiled a 5–5 record and was outscored by a total of 120 to 99. The team played its home games at Mountaineer Field in Morgantown, West Virginia. Victor Peelish was the team captain.

West Virginia was ranked at No. 71 in the final Litkenhous Difference by Score System rankings for 1946.

== Schedule ==
Date	Opponent	Site	Result	Attendance	Source
September 21	Otterbein	Mountaineer Field; Morgantown, WV	W 13–7	10,000	
September 28	at Pittsburgh	Pitt Stadium; Pittsburgh, PA (rivalry)	L 7–33	> 30,000	
October 5	Waynesburg	Mountaineer Field; Morgantown, WV	W 42–0	7,500	
October 12	vs. Washington and Lee	Charleston, WV	W 6–0		
October 18	at Temple	Philadelphia, PA	L 0–6	20,000	
October 26	Syracuse^{†}	Mountaineer Field; Morgantown, WV (rivalry)	W 13–0	18,000	
November 2	at No. 1 Army	Michie Stadium; West Point, NY	L 0–19	25,000	
November 9	Fordham	Mountaineer Field; Morgantown, WV	W 39–0	13,000	
November 16	at Kentucky	McLean Stadium; Lexington, KY	L 0–13	20,000	
November 23	at Virginia	Scott Stadium; Charlottesville, VA	L 0–21	12,000	
^{†}Homecoming; Rankings from AP Poll released prior to the game
