= 1946 Davidson Wildcats football team =

American college football season

1946 Davidson Wildcats football
- Conference: Southern Conference
- Record: 4–5 (1–5 SoCon)
- Head coach: William Story (1st season)
- Home stadium: Richardson Stadium; American Legion Memorial Stadium

1946 Southern Conference football standings
	Conf.					Overall
Team	W		L		T	W		L		T
No. 9 North Carolina $	4	–	0	–	1	8	–	2	–	1
William & Mary	7	–	1	–	0	8	–	2	–	0
No. 18 NC State	6	–	1	–	0	8	–	3	–	0
South Carolina	4	–	2	–	0	5	–	3	–	0
Duke	3	–	2	–	0	4	–	5	–	0
Richmond	3	–	2	–	2	6	–	2	–	2
VPI	3	–	3	–	2	3	–	4	–	3
VMI	2	–	3	–	1	4	–	5	–	1
George Washington	1	–	1	–	0	4	–	3	–	0
Clemson	2	–	3	–	0	4	–	5	–	0
Wake Forest	2	–	3	–	0	6	–	3	–	0
Maryland	2	–	5	–	0	3	–	6	–	0
Furman	1	–	4	–	0	2	–	8	–	0
Washington and Lee	1	–	4	–	0	2	–	6	–	0
The Citadel	1	–	5	–	0	3	–	5	–	0
Davidson	1	–	5	–	0	4	–	5	–	0
$ – Conference champion; Rankings from AP Poll

The 1946 Davidson Wildcats football team was an American football team that represented Davidson University as a member of the Southern Conference during the 1947 college football season. In its first season under head coach William Story, the team compiled a 4–5 record (1–5 against conference opponents) and outscored opponents by a total of 206 to 130. The team played its home games at Richardson Stadium in Davidson, North Carolina.

== Schedule ==
Date	Opponent	Site	Result	Attendance	Source
September 21	Erskine*	Richardson Stadium; Davidson, NC	W 74–0	5,000	
October 5	Wofford	American Legion Memorial Stadium; Charlotte, NC	W 54–0		
October 12	at No. 19 NC State	Riddick Stadium; Raleigh, NC	L 0–25	18,000	
October 19	at VMI	Alumni Field; Lexington, VA	L 0–25	4,000	
October 26	Hampden-Sydney*	Richardson Stadium; Davidson, NC	W 40–0	5,000	
November 2	Washington and Lee	Richardson Stadium; Davidson, NC	L 6–25		
November 9	Richmond	Richardson Stadium; Davidson, NC	L 6–27	3,000	
November 23	The Citadel	American Legion Memorial Stadium; Charlotte, NC	L 13–21	5,000	
November 28	Furman	Sirrine Stadium; Greenville, SC	W 13–7		
*Non-conference game; Rankings from AP Poll released prior to the game
