= 1946 VMI Keydets football team =

American college football season

1946 VMI Keydets football
- Conference: Southern Conference
- Record: 4–5–1 (3–3–1 SoCon)
- Head coach: Pooley Hubert (10th season)
- Home stadium: Alumni Field

1946 Southern Conference football standings
	Conf.					Overall
Team	W		L		T	W		L		T
No. 9 North Carolina $	4	–	0	–	1	8	–	2	–	1
William & Mary	7	–	1	–	0	8	–	2	–	0
No. 18 NC State	6	–	1	–	0	8	–	3	–	0
South Carolina	4	–	2	–	0	5	–	3	–	0
Duke	3	–	2	–	0	4	–	5	–	0
Richmond	3	–	2	–	2	6	–	2	–	2
VPI	3	–	3	–	2	3	–	4	–	3
VMI	2	–	3	–	1	4	–	5	–	1
George Washington	1	–	1	–	0	4	–	3	–	0
Clemson	2	–	3	–	0	4	–	5	–	0
Wake Forest	2	–	3	–	0	6	–	3	–	0
Maryland	2	–	5	–	0	3	–	6	–	0
Furman	1	–	4	–	0	2	–	8	–	0
Washington and Lee	1	–	4	–	0	2	–	6	–	0
The Citadel	1	–	5	–	0	3	–	5	–	0
Davidson	1	–	5	–	0	4	–	5	–	0
$ – Conference champion; Rankings from AP Poll

The 1946 VMI Keydets football team was an American football team that represented the Virginia Military Institute (VMI) during the 1946 college football season as a member of the Southern Conference (SoCon). In their tenth year under head coach Pooley Hubert, the team compiled a 4–5–1 record (3–3–1 against SoCon opponents) and was outscored by a total of 203 to 133.

== Schedule ==
Date	Opponent	Site	Result	Attendance	Source
September 21	Catawba*	Alumni Field; Lexington, VA	W 21–7	4,000	
September 28	at Richmond	City Stadium; Richmond, VA (rivalry)	T 7–7	13,000	
October 5	at Georgia Tech*	Grant Field; Atlanta, GA	L 6–32	25,000	
October 12	at Virginia	Scott Stadium; Charlottesville, VA	L 8–19	16,000	
October 19	Davidson^{†}	Alumni Field; Lexington, VA	W 25–0	4,000	
October 26	at No. 18 William & Mary	Cary Field; Williamsburg VA (rivalry)	L 0–41	10,000	
November 2	vs. NC State	Victory Stadium; Roanoke, VA	L 7–49	6,000	
November 9	at Furman	Sirrine Stadium; Greenville, SC	W 26–7		
November 16	The Citadel	Alumni Field; Lexington, VA (Rivalry)	W 26–7	3,000	
November 28	vs. VPI	Victory Stadium; Roanoke, VA (rivalry)	L 7–20	24,000–28,000	
*Non-conference game; ^{†}Homecoming; Rankings from AP Poll released prior to the game
