= J. Quinn Decker =

American football player and coach (1907–1987)

Biographical details
- Born: October 29, 1907
- Died: December 20, 1987 (aged 80); Knoxville, Tennessee, U.S.

Playing career

Football
- 1928–1930: Tennessee
- Position: Fullback

Coaching career (HC unless noted)

Football
- 1932–1934: Knox Country Central HS (TN)
- 1935–1937: Centre (backfield)
- 1938–1941: Centre
- 1944–1945: Third Air Force
- 1946–1952: The Citadel

Basketball
- 1936–1937: Centre (freshmen)
- 1937–1941: Centre

Administrative career (AD unless noted)
- 1938–1942: Centre
- 1946–1953: The Citadel

Head coaching record
- Overall: 52–61–4 (college football)

Accomplishments and honors

Championships
- Football; 1 AAF League (1945)

James Quinn Decker (October 29, 1907 – December 20, 1987) was an American football player and coach. He served as the head football coach Centre College from 1938 to 1941 and The Citadel from 1946 to 1952, compiling a career college football coaching record of 37–56–3.

== Playing career ==
Decker played fullback at the University of Tennessee. He later became an assistant coach at the school.

== Coaching career ==
=== High school coaching ===
Before coaching in college, Decker coached football at the high school level at Central High School in Knoxville, Tennessee.

=== Centre College ===
Decker was the head football coach at Centre College in Danville, Kentucky from 1938 until completion of the 1941 season.

=== The Citadel ===
Quinn was the 11th head football coach at The Citadel, The Military College of South Carolina, serving for seven seasons, from 1946 until 1952, and compiling a record of 23–39–1. He led the program in its re-establishment after World War II.

== Head coaching record ==
=== College football ===
Year	Team	Overall	Conference	Standing	Bowl/playoffs
Centre Colonels (Southern Intercollegiate Athletic Association) (1938–1941)
1938	Centre	7–2	4–0	2nd	
1939	Centre	1–5–2	1–1–1	T–14th	
1940	Centre	3–6	2–1	T–9th	
1941	Centre	3–4	2–0	T–2nd	
Centre:		14–17–2	9–2–1		
Third Air Force Gremlins (Independent) (1944)
1944	Third Air Force	8–3			
Third Air Force Gremlins (Army Air Forces League) (1945)
1945	Third Air Force	7–2–1	4–1–1	T–1st	
Third Air Force:		15–5–1	4–1–1		
The Citadel Bulldogs (Southern Conference) (1946–1952)
1946	The Citadel	3–5	1–5	15th	
1947	The Citadel	3–5	1–4	12th	
1948	The Citadel	2–7	0–5	16th	
1949	The Citadel	4–5	2–2	7th	
1950	The Citadel	4–6	2–3	11th	
1951	The Citadel	4–6	1–3	14th	
1952	The Citadel	3–5–1	1–3–1	13th	
The Citadel:		23–39–1	8–25		
Total:		52–61–4			
National championship Conference title Conference division title or championship game berth
