= 1946 Furman Purple Hurricane football team =

American college football season

1946 Furman Purple Hurricane football
- Conference: Southern Conference
- Record: 2–8 (1–4 SoCon)
- Head coach: Bob Smith (1st season)
- Captain: Fred Hilliard
- Home stadium: Sirrine Stadium

1946 Southern Conference football standings
	Conf.					Overall
Team	W		L		T	W		L		T
No. 9 North Carolina $	4	–	0	–	1	8	–	2	–	1
William & Mary	7	–	1	–	0	8	–	2	–	0
No. 18 NC State	6	–	1	–	0	8	–	3	–	0
South Carolina	4	–	2	–	0	5	–	3	–	0
Duke	3	–	2	–	0	4	–	5	–	0
Richmond	3	–	2	–	2	6	–	2	–	2
VPI	3	–	3	–	2	3	–	4	–	3
VMI	2	–	3	–	1	4	–	5	–	1
George Washington	1	–	1	–	0	4	–	3	–	0
Clemson	2	–	3	–	0	4	–	5	–	0
Wake Forest	2	–	3	–	0	6	–	3	–	0
Maryland	2	–	5	–	0	3	–	6	–	0
Furman	1	–	4	–	0	2	–	8	–	0
Washington and Lee	1	–	4	–	0	2	–	6	–	0
The Citadel	1	–	5	–	0	3	–	5	–	0
Davidson	1	–	5	–	0	4	–	5	–	0
$ – Conference champion; Rankings from AP Poll

The 1946 Furman Purple Hurricane football team was an American football team that represented Furman University as a member of the Southern Conference (SoCon) during the 1946 college football season. In their first season under head coach Bob Smith, Furman compiled an overall record of 2–8 with a mark of 1–4 in conference play, tying for 13th place in the SoCon.

== Schedule ==
Date	Opponent	Site	Result	Attendance	Source
September 20	at Alabama*	Legion Field; Birmingham, AL	L 7–26	25,000	
September 27	Wofford*	Sirrine Stadium; Greenville, SC (rivalry)	W 31–0		
October 5	at Auburn*	Auburn Stadium; Auburn, AL	L 6–26	11,000	
October 11	South Carolina	Sirrine Stadium; Greenville, SC	L 7–14	14,000	
October 19	at The Citadel	Johnson Hagood Stadium; Charleston, SC (rivalry)	W 14–0	8,500	
October 26	No. 8 Georgia*	Sirrine Stadium; Greenville, SC	L 7–70	12,000	
November 9	VMI	Sirrine Stadium; Greenville, SC	L 7–26		
November 16	at Clemson	Memorial Stadium; Clemson, SC	L 6–20	18,000	
November 23	at No. 6 Georgia Tech*	Grant Field; Atlanta, GA	L 7–41	17,000	
November 28	Davidson^{†}	Sirrine Stadium; Greenville, SC	L 7–13	10,000	
*Non-conference game; ^{†}Homecoming; Rankings from AP Poll released prior to the game
