= 1946 Wofford Terriers football team =

American college football season

1946 Wofford Terriers football
- Conference: South Carolina Little Four
- Record: 1–8 (1–2 Little Four)
- Head coach: Ted Petoskey (1st` season)

The 1946 Wofford Terriers football team represented Wofford College as a member of the South Carolina Little Four during the 1946 college football season. In their first and only season under head coach Ted Petoskey, the Terriers compiled 1–8 record and failed to score a point in the first five games of the season.

== Schedule ==
Date	Opponent	Site	Result	Attendance	Source
September 27	at Furman*	Sirrine Stadium; Greenville, SC (rivalry)	L 0–32		
October 5	at Davidson*	Charlotte, NC	L 0–54		
October 12	Catawba*	Spartanburg, SC	L 0–46	2,000	
October 19	Guilford*	Spartanburg, SC	L 0–36		
November 2	at Newberry	Newberry, SC	L 0–13	1,500	
November 9	Presbyterian	Spartanburg, SC	L 14–33	2,500	
November 16	at High Point*	High Point, NC	L 0–21	2,000	
November 23	at Randolph-Macon*	Ashland, VA	L 13–14		
November 30	Erskine	Spartanburg, SC	W 41–6	3,000	
*Non-conference game
