= 1946 Virginia Cavaliers football team =

American college football season

1946 Virginia Cavaliers football
- Conference: Independent
- Record: 4–4–1
- Head coach: Art Guepe (1st season)
- Captain: H. Lockwood Frizzell
- Home stadium: Scott Stadium

1946 Southern major college football independents records
	Conf.			Overall
Team	W	L	T	W		L		T
Miami (FL)		–		8	–	2	–	0
Georgetown		–		5	–	3	–	0
Virginia		–		4	–	4	–	1
Chattanooga		–		5	–	5	–	0
West Virginia		–		5	–	5	–	0
Navy		–		1	–	8	–	0

The 1946 Virginia Cavaliers football team was an American football team that represented the University of Virginia as an independent during the 1946 college football season. In their first year under head coach Art Guepe, the Cavaliers compiled a 4–4–1 record and outscored opponents by a total of 180 to 170.

Virginia was ranked at No. 74 in the final Litkenhous Difference by Score System rankings for 1946.

They played their home games at Scott Stadium in Charlottesville, Virginia.

== Schedule ==
Date	Opponent	Site	Result	Attendance	Source
September 28	Hampden–Sydney	Scott Stadium; Charlottesville, VA	W 71–0	12,000	
October 5	vs. VPI	Victory Stadium; Roanoke, VA (rivalry)	T 21–21	20,000	
October 12	VMI^{†}	Scott Stadium; Charlottesville, VA	W 19–8	16,000	
October 19	at No. 6 Penn	Franklin Field; Philadelphia, PA	L 0–40	64,000	
November 2	at Richmond	City Stadium; Richmond, VA	L 7–19	13,000	
November 9	at Princeton	Palmer Stadium; Princeton, NJ	W 20–6	24,000	
November 16	at NC State	Riddick Stadium; Raleigh, NC	L 7–27	18,000	
November 23	West Virginia	Scott Stadium; Charlottesville, VA	W 21–0	12,000	
November 30	No. 11 North Carolina	Scott Stadium; Charlottesville, VA (South's Oldest Rivalry)	L 14–49	22,500	
^{†}Homecoming; Rankings from AP Poll released prior to the game

== After the season ==
The 1947 NFL draft was held on December 16, 1946. The following Cavalier was selected.

Round	Pick	Player	Position	NFL club
23	208	Tom Dudley	End	Washington Redskins
