= 1946 Columbia Lions football team =

American college football season

1946 Columbia Lions football
- Conference: Ivy League
- Record: 6–3 (2–2 Ivy)
- Head coach: Lou Little (17th season)
- Home stadium: Baker Field

1946 Ivy Group football standings
	Conf.					Overall
Team	W		L		T	W		L		T
No. 12 Yale	4	–	1	–	1	7	–	1	–	1
Harvard	3	–	1	–	0	7	–	2	–	0
No. 13 Penn	3	–	1	–	0	6	–	2	–	0
Cornell	3	–	1	–	1	5	–	3	–	1
Columbia	2	–	2	–	0	6	–	3	–	0
Princeton	2	–	4	–	0	3	–	5	–	0
Brown	1	–	3	–	0	3	–	5	–	1
Dartmouth	1	–	6	–	0	3	–	6	–	0
Rankings from AP Poll

The 1946 Columbia Lions football team was an American football team that represented the Columbia University in the Ivy League during the 1946 college football season. In their 17th season under head coach Lou Little, the team compiled a 6–3 record and outscored opponents by a total of 222 to 176.

Columbia was ranked at No. 36 in the final Litkenhous Difference by Score System rankings for 1946.

== Schedule ==
Date	Opponent	Rank	Site	Result	Attendance	Source
September 28	Rutgers*		Baker Field; New York, NY	W 13–7	23,000	
October 5	Navy*		Baker Field; New York, NY	W 23–14	35,000	
October 12	at No. 15 Yale	No. 11	Yale Bowl; New Haven, CT	W 28–20	65,000	
October 19	at No. 1 Army*	No. 11	Michie Stadium; West Point, NY	L 14–48	25,500	
October 26	at Dartmouth		Memorial Field; Hanover, NH	W 33–13	13,000	
November 2	Cornell		Baker Field; New York, NY (rivalry)	L 0–12	35,000	
November 9	No. 9 Penn		Baker Field; New York, NY	L 6–41	35,000	
November 16	Lafayette*		Baker Field; New York, NY	W 46–0	12,000	
November 23	Syracuse*		Baker Field; New York, NY	W 59–21	30,000	
*Non-conference game; Rankings from AP Poll released prior to the game

== Rankings ==
Ranking movements Legend: ██ Increase in ranking ██ Decrease in ranking — = Not ranked
	Week								
Poll	1	2	3	4	5	6	7	8	Final
AP	11	11	—	—	—	—	—	—	—
