= 1946 Harvard Crimson football team =

American college football season

1946 Harvard Crimson football
- Conference: Ivy League
- Record: 7–2 (3–1 Ivy)
- Head coach: Dick Harlow (10th season)
- Captain: Cleo O'Donnell Jr.
- Home stadium: Harvard Stadium

1946 Ivy Group football standings
	Conf.					Overall
Team	W		L		T	W		L		T
No. 12 Yale	4	–	1	–	1	7	–	1	–	1
Harvard	3	–	1	–	0	7	–	2	–	0
No. 13 Penn	3	–	1	–	0	6	–	2	–	0
Cornell	3	–	1	–	1	5	–	3	–	1
Columbia	2	–	2	–	0	6	–	3	–	0
Princeton	2	–	4	–	0	3	–	5	–	0
Brown	1	–	3	–	0	3	–	5	–	1
Dartmouth	1	–	6	–	0	3	–	6	–	0
Rankings from AP Poll

The 1946 Harvard Crimson football team was an American football team that represented Harvard University in the Ivy League during the 1946 college football season. In its 10th season under head coach Dick Harlow, the team compiled a 7–2 record and outscored their opponents 214 to 65.

Despite the end of World War II and return of its longtime coach from military service in 1945, Harvard continued to designate its football program "informal" that year. The 1946 season thus represented the return of "major" college football to Harvard for the first time since fall 1942.

Harvard was ranked at No. 46 in the final Litkenhous Difference by Score System rankings for 1946.

Harvard played its home games at Harvard Stadium in the Allston neighborhood of Boston, Massachusetts.

== Schedule ==
Date	Opponent	Rank	Site	Result	Attendance	Source
September 28	Connecticut*		Harvard Stadium; Boston, MA	W 7–0	14,000	
October 5	Tufts*		Harvard Stadium; Boston, MA	W 49–0	16,000	
October 12	at Princeton		Palmer Stadium; Princeton, NJ (rivalry)	W 13–12	35,000	
October 19	Coast Guard*		Harvard Stadium; Boston, MA	W 69–0	15,000	
October 26	Holy Cross*	No. 20	Harvard Stadium; Boston, MA	W 13–6	40,000	
November 2	Rutgers*	No. 17	Harvard Stadium; Boston, MA	L 0–13	12,000	
November 9	at Dartmouth		Memorial Stadium; Hanover, NH (rivalry)	W 21–7	16,000	
November 16	Brown		Harvard Stadium; Boston, MA	W 28–0	20,000	
November 23	No. 15 Yale		Harvard Stadium; Boston, MA (The Game)	L 14–27	57,300	
*Non-conference game; Rankings from AP Poll released prior to the game

== Rankings ==
Ranking movements Legend: ██ Increase in ranking ██ Decrease in ranking — = Not ranked ( ) = First-place votes
	Week								
Poll	1	2	3	4	5	6	7	8	Final
AP	—	—	20	17 (1)	—	—	—	—	—
