= 1947 Gator Bowl =

American college football game

- 2nd Gator Bowl
Oklahoma Sooners	NC State Wolfpack
(7–3)	(8–2)
Big Six	SoCon
34	13
Head coach: Jim Tatum	Head coach: Beattie Feathers
AP 14	AP 18
	1	2	3	4	Total
Oklahoma	7	20	0	7	34
NC State	0	7	0	6	13
- Date: January 1, 1947
- Season: 1946
- Stadium: Fairfield Stadium
- Location: Jacksonville, Florida
- MVP: HB Joe Golding
- Referee: Dave Kaufman (Southern; split crew: Southern, Big Six)
- Attendance: 10,034

The 1947 Gator Bowl was a college football postseason bowl game between the Oklahoma Sooners and the NC State Wolfpack.

== Background ==
Oklahoma was co-champion of the Big Six Conference in Tatum's first season. It was their first since 1944. The Wolfpack finished 3rd in the Southern Conference, with a 6–1 record. This was NC State's first bowl game appearance and Oklahoma's second. This was the first Gator Bowl for either team.

== Game summary ==
In the first two minutes, the Sooners took the lead on an Eddie Eavis touchdown run. Howard Turner threw a 58-yard pass to Al Phillips to tie the score at 7 in the second period. But the Sooners went on a 20-point rampage from three rushing touchdowns (one each from Davis, Dave Wallace and Joe Golding) in the quarter to take a 27–7 lead at halftime. The Wolfpack narrowed the lead in the fourth with a 67-yard march that ended with an eight-yard touchdown run by Les Palmer to make it 27–13. Charlie Sarratt threw a touchdown pass to make it 34–13. Golding went for 91 yards on 12 rushes. This was the Sooners' first bowl win.

== Aftermath ==
Tatum left for Maryland after this game, but the Sooners went to 8 bowl games in 17 season, won 14 Big Six Conference titles, and 3 national championships under their next head coach, Bud Wilkinson. The Wolfpack would not reach another bowl game until 1963. Oklahoma would make two more appearances in the Gator Bowl while NC State made two more appearances, winning their first in 2003.

== Statistics ==
Statistics	Oklahoma	NC State
First downs	12	13
Yards rushing	195	136
Yards passing	75	103
Total yards	270	139
Punts-Average	5-31.0	4-36.0
Fumbles-Lost	4-3	2-1
Interceptions	2	3
Penalties-Yards	7-34	3-13
