= 1947 Sun Bowl =

American college football game

VPI Gobblers	Cincinnati Bearcats
(3–3–3)	(8–2)
Southern Conference	Independent
6	18
Head coach: James Kitts	Head coach: Ray Nolting
	1	2	3	4	Total
VPI	0	0	0	6	6
Cincinnati	0	0	12	6	18
- Date: January 1, 1947
- Season: 1946
- Stadium: Kidd Field
- Location: El Paso, Texas
- Attendance: approximately 10,000
- Payout: US$9,438 per team

The 1947 Sun Bowl was a post-season American college football bowl game between the VPI Gobblers (now the Virginia Tech Hokies) (Note: VPI became Virginia Tech in 1970, and the team's nickname became Hokies in 1981.) of the Southern Conference (SoCon) and the independent Cincinnati Bearcats. It took place on January 1, 1947, at Kidd Field in El Paso, Texas. Cincinnati won, 18–6, in cold and icy conditions that led to a scoreless first half and three blocked extra points by VPI. The game was the first NCAA-sanctioned post-season football contest for Cincinnati, and was the first bowl game in VPI history. The 1947 game was also the 13th edition of the Sun Bowl, which had been played every year since 1935. In exchange for their participation in the event, each team received $9,438.

== Teams ==
The 1947 Sun Bowl game was held as the culminating event of the Sun Carnival and was held at 15,000-seat Kidd Field on the campus of Texas Western University, today known as the University of Texas at El Paso (UTEP). The matchup of VPI and Cincinnati was out of character for the Sun Bowl, which traditionally matched the champion of the Border Conference with the best possible opponent. Hardin–Simmons University, champions of the Border Conference, declined a Sun Bowl bid, as did the second-place team, Texas Tech. With no other option, a member of the Sun Bowl Committee—who happened to be an alumnus of VPI—suggested inviting the Gobblers to play against Cincinnati, which had already accepted an invitation.

=== VPI ===
VPI came into the game having gone 3–3–3 under coach James Kitts. Kitts, in his first year replacing coach H. M. McEver, had coached the team in 1941 before the outbreak of World War II interrupted the football program. During the 1946 season, Kitts' team defeated the No. 12 NC State Wolfpack for the first win over an Associated Press Top 25 team in school history, the Washington and Lee University Generals, and VPI's traditional rivals, the Virginia Military Institute Keydets. During VPI's preparations before its departure for El Paso, heavy snow fell on Blacksburg, Virginia, forcing the team to use snowplows and construction equipment to clear a space for the team to practice. The team traveled to El Paso without star punter and rusher Bobby Smith, who had been injured in the team's final regular-season game.

=== Cincinnati ===
The Cincinnati Bearcats traveled to El Paso having amassed an 8–2 record under second-year head coach Ray Nolting, who took the head coaching position in Cincinnati with the revival of the football program after the end of World War II. The Bearcats' two losses came against Kentucky and at Tulsa, and they earned wins against tough opponents such as Indiana, Michigan State, and Ohio.

The 1947 Sun Bowl was the Bearcats' first official bowl game, although Cincinnati played two post-season games in New Orleans following the 1897 college football season. The 1897 Cincinnati football team completed a 7–1–1 season, losing only to the Carlisle Indians. Following the conclusion of its football schedule, the Bearcats were invited to New Orleans by the Southern Athletic Club to play a football game on New Year's Day. Cincinnati easily defeated the Athletic Club team, and at the victory party following the win, students from nearby Louisiana State University (LSU) invited the Cincinnati players to come to their school to play another game. The Cincinnati–LSU game, which took place a few days later and pre-dated the first Rose Bowl Game by five years, resulted in a 22–0 Cincinnati win. This game could be considered, the school's athletic department contemplates, as the first bowl game in Cincinnati football history.

== Game summary ==
The game was played in extremely cold and icy conditions, still the worst in Sun Bowl history. Three inches of snow fell on top of a layer of frozen rain the day before the game, and at kickoff the teams took the field under cloudy skies and in below-freezing temperatures. Despite the inclement weather, 15,000-seat Kidd Field was approximately half full, and bowl officials estimated the crowd at around 10,000 people.

Weather conditions allowed both teams' defenses to dominate in the first half. VPI had the best chance to score of either team in the first half when it drove to a first down inside the Cincinnati two-yard line late in the first quarter. On four straight running plays, however, the Bearcats' defense held, and VPI was denied a scoring opportunity.

In the second half, Cincinnati's offense managed to begin moving the ball effectively. On Cincinnati's first play of the half, halfback Roger Stephens broke through the defensive line for 26 yards, taking the ball inside VPI territory. Cincinnati's drive would overcome two 15-yard penalties and one five-yard penalty en route to a touchdown just a few plays later. On its next possession, Cincinnati's All-American Roger Stephens again broke off another long run, this time for 19 yards, setting up another Bearcats' touchdown. VPI countered with a long drive that reached the Cincinnati 23-yard line before an errant pass was intercepted by the Bearcats in the end zone. VPI managed a defensive stop, however, and marched down the field for a touchdown to climb within six points. Cincinnati sealed its victory, however, when Bearcats halfback Harold Johnson intercepted a pass late in the fourth quarter, returning it all the way to the VPI 25-yard line. That return set up a Cincinnati touchdown and put the Bearcats up by the game's final score, 18–6.

=== Statistics ===
Statistical comparison
	UC	VPI
1st Downs	16	13
Total yards	463	119
Passing yards	94	85
Rushing yards	369	34
Penalties	9–100	3–25
Turnovers	0	2

VPI blocked all three Cincinnati extra point attempts, while their own sole extra point kick missed. Cincinnati's kicking woes were also reflected in their punting game. Cincinnati averaged just 19 yards per punt, setting the record for the lowest punting average in Sun Bowl history. All 24 of the game's points were scored in the second half. VPI earned just 34 rushing yards against the Bearcats' defense while allowing 369 yards to Cincinnati's rushing offense. Those two totals remain the least-gained and most-allowed marks in Virginia Tech bowl game history.

Prior to 1954, the Sun Bowl did not award most valuable player honors, but Harold Johnson from Cincinnati intercepted two passes (one in the end zone) and scoring the first touchdown of the game on a 13-yard run.
