= 1946 Princeton Tigers football team =

American college football season

1946 Princeton Tigers football
- Conference: Ivy League
- Record: 3–5 (2–4 Ivy)
- Head coach: Charlie Caldwell (2nd season)
- Home stadium: Palmer Stadium

1946 Ivy Group football standings
	Conf.					Overall
Team	W		L		T	W		L		T
No. 12 Yale	4	–	1	–	1	7	–	1	–	1
Harvard	3	–	1	–	0	7	–	2	–	0
No. 13 Penn	3	–	1	–	0	6	–	2	–	0
Cornell	3	–	1	–	1	5	–	3	–	1
Columbia	2	–	2	–	0	6	–	3	–	0
Princeton	2	–	4	–	0	3	–	5	–	0
Brown	1	–	3	–	0	3	–	5	–	1
Dartmouth	1	–	6	–	0	3	–	6	–	0
Rankings from AP Poll

The 1946 Princeton Tigers football team was an American football team that represented Princeton University in the Ivy League during the 1946 college football season. In its second season under head coach Charlie Caldwell, the team compiled a 3–5 record and was outscored by a total of 130 to 104.

Princeton was ranked at No. 57 in the final Litkenhous Difference by Score System rankings for 1946.

Princeton played its 1946 home games at Palmer Stadium in Princeton, New Jersey.

== Schedule ==
Date	Opponent	Site	Result	Attendance	Source
October 5	Brown	Palmer Stadium; Princeton, NJ	W 33–12	16,000	
October 12	Harvard	Palmer Stadium; Princeton, NJ (rivalry)	L 12–13	35,000	
October 19	Rutgers*	Palmer Stadium; Princeton, NJ (rivalry)	W 14–7	45,000	
October 26	Cornell	Palmer Stadium; Princeton, NJ	L 7–14	33,000	
November 2	at No. 3 Penn	Franklin Field; Philadelphia, PA (rivalry)	W 17–14	72,000	
November 9	Virginia*	Palmer Stadium; Princeton, NJ	L 6–20	24,000	
November 16	at No. 18 Yale	Yale Bowl; New Haven, CT (rivalry)	L 2–30	70,000	
November 23	Dartmouth	Palmer Stadium; Princeton, NJ	L 13–20	34,000	
*Non-conference game; Rankings from AP Poll released prior to the game
