= Cleo O'Donnell Jr. =

American football player and coach

Biographical details
- Born: November 5, 1921; Worcester, Massachusetts, U.S.
- Died: January 14, 1985 (aged 63); Waltham, Massachusetts, U.S.

Playing career

Football
- 1941–1942: Harvard
- 1946: Harvard
- Position: Halfback

Coaching career (HC unless noted)

Men's basketball
- 1947–48: Curry
- 1950–51: MIT

Football
- 1948: St. Mary's HS (MA)

Cleo Albert O'Donnell Jr. (November 5, 1921 – January 14, 1985) was an American athlete and coach who played for the Harvard Crimson football team and was the head men's basketball coach at Curry College and the Massachusetts Institute of Technology.

== Playing ==
O'Donnell was born on November 5, 1921. He was the oldest of five children. His father, Cleo A. O'Donnell, was a college football player who coached at Everett High School, Holy Cross, Purdue, and Saint Anselm. He grew up in Worcester, Massachusetts and attended Worcester Classical High School and the Worcester Academy. Rather than follow in his father's footsteps at Holy Cross, O'Donnell enrolled at Harvard College in 1940. He was a member of the freshman team that season and was the backup halfback behind Franny Lee on the 1941 Harvard Crimson football team. He took over as the starter in 1942. He threw for Harvard's only touchdown in a 7–7 tie against William & Mary and intercepted a pass in that year's Harvard–Yale game. He was elected captain of the 1943 Harvard Crimson football team, but entered active duty with the United States Marine Corps before the season began. He served in the Pacific Theatre and was discharged in 1946 with the rank of master sergeant. He returned to Harvard that fall and was captain of the 1946 Harvard Crimson football team. He scored the game–winning touchdown in the season opener against UConn. One of his teammates that season was his younger brother, Kenneth O'Donnell.

== Coaching ==
After graduating, O'Donnell became the varsity basketball and freshman baseball coach at Curry College. He then served as the head football coach at St. Mary's High School in Waltham, Massachusetts during the 1948 season. He was the head men's basketball coach at the Massachusetts Institute of Technology during the 1950–51 season and led the team to a 5–9 record.

== Later life ==
O'Donnell worked as an architectural engineer. He was a longtime general manager for WZMH Habib and spent the later years of his career with Richard Manning Associates. He died unexpectedly on January 14, 1985, at his home in Waltham.
