= 1946 Penn Quakers football team =

American college football season

1946 Penn Quakers football
- Conference: Ivy League

Ranking
- AP: No. 13
- Record: 6–2 (3–1 Ivy)
- Head coach: George Munger (9th season)
- Home stadium: Franklin Field

1946 Ivy Group football standings
	Conf.					Overall
Team	W		L		T	W		L		T
No. 12 Yale	4	–	1	–	1	7	–	1	–	1
Harvard	3	–	1	–	0	7	–	2	–	0
No. 13 Penn	3	–	1	–	0	6	–	2	–	0
Cornell	3	–	1	–	1	5	–	3	–	1
Columbia	2	–	2	–	0	6	–	3	–	0
Princeton	2	–	4	–	0	3	–	5	–	0
Brown	1	–	3	–	0	3	–	5	–	1
Dartmouth	1	–	6	–	0	3	–	6	–	0
Rankings from AP Poll

The 1946 Penn Quakers football team was an American football team that represented the University of Pennsylvania in the Ivy League during the 1946 college football season. In its ninth season under head coach George Munger, the team compiled a 6–2 record, was ranked No. 13 in the final AP Poll, and outscored opponents by a total of 265 to 102.

The Quakers ranked third nationally in total defense, giving up an average of only 158.9 yards per game. They also ranked fourth in scoring offense (33.1 points per game), 10th nationally in total offense (340.0 yards per game), and ninth in rushing offense (233.1 rushing yards per game). They were ranked at No. 8 in the final Litkenhous Difference by Score System rankings.

Four Penn players received honors from the Associated Press (AP) or International News Service (INS) on the 1946 All-Eastern football team: center Chuck Bednarik (AP-1, INS-1); tackle B. Gallagher (AP-1); guard Robert Rutkowski; and halfback Maderak (INS-2).

Chuck Bednarik and George Munger were inducted into the College Football Hall of Fame in 1969 and 1976, respectively.

The team played its home games at Franklin Field in Philadelphia.

== Schedule ==
Date	Opponent	Rank	Site	Result	Attendance	Source
October 5	Lafayette		Franklin Field; Philadelphia, PA	W 66–0	63,000	
October 12	Dartmouth	No. 7	Franklin Field; Philadelphia, PA	W 39–6	69,000	
October 19	Virginia	No. 6	Franklin Field; Philadelphia, PA	W 40–0	64,000	
October 26	Navy	No. 6	Franklin Field; Philadelphia, PA	W 32–19	78,000	
November 2	Princeton	No. 3	Franklin Field; Philadelphia, PA (rivalry)	L 14–17	72,000	
November 9	at Columbia	No. 9	Baker Field; New York, NY	W 41–6	35,000	
November 16	No. 1 Army	No. 5	Franklin Field; Philadelphia, PA	L 7–34	78,000	
November 28	Cornell	No. 14	Franklin Field; Philadelphia, PA (rivalry)	W 26–20	78,000	
Rankings from AP Poll released prior to the game

== Rankings ==
Ranking movements Legend: ██ Increase in ranking ██ Decrease in ranking ( ) = First-place votes
	Week								
Poll	1	2	3	4	5	6	7	8	Final
AP	7 (1)	6 (2)	6 (¼)	3 (4)	9	5	13	14	13

== After the season ==
The 1947 NFL draft was held on December 16, 1946. The following Quakers were selected.

Round	Pick	Player	Position	NFL club
5	30	George Savitsky	Tackle	Philadelphia Eagles
6	36	Bernie Gallagher	Guard	Detroit Lions
7	46	Ed Grain	Guard	Detroit Lions
14	118	Red Moore	Guard	Pittsburgh Steelers
29	275	Jerry McCarthy	End	Chicago Bears
