= 1946 Duke Blue Devils football team =

American college football season

1946 Duke Blue Devils football
- Conference: Southern Conference
- Record: 4–5 (3–2 SoCon)
- Head coach: Wallace Wade (12th season)
- MVP: George Clark
- Captain: Bill Milner
- Home stadium: Duke Stadium

1946 Southern Conference football standings
	Conf.					Overall
Team	W		L		T	W		L		T
No. 9 North Carolina $	4	–	0	–	1	8	–	2	–	1
William & Mary	7	–	1	–	0	8	–	2	–	0
No. 18 NC State	6	–	1	–	0	8	–	3	–	0
South Carolina	4	–	2	–	0	5	–	3	–	0
Duke	3	–	2	–	0	4	–	5	–	0
Richmond	3	–	2	–	2	6	–	2	–	2
VPI	3	–	3	–	2	3	–	4	–	3
VMI	2	–	3	–	1	4	–	5	–	1
George Washington	1	–	1	–	0	4	–	3	–	0
Clemson	2	–	3	–	0	4	–	5	–	0
Wake Forest	2	–	3	–	0	6	–	3	–	0
Maryland	2	–	5	–	0	3	–	6	–	0
Furman	1	–	4	–	0	2	–	8	–	0
Washington and Lee	1	–	4	–	0	2	–	6	–	0
The Citadel	1	–	5	–	0	3	–	5	–	0
Davidson	1	–	5	–	0	4	–	5	–	0
$ – Conference champion; Rankings from AP Poll

The 1946 Duke Blue Devils football team was an American football team that represented Duke University as a member of the Southern Conference (SoCon) during the 1946 college football season. In their 12th season under head coach Wallace Wade, the Blue Devils compiled a 4–5 record (3–2 against SoCon opponents) and outscored all opponent by a total of 134 to 86.

Duke led the SoCon with three players chosen as first-team picks on the 1946 All-Southern Conference football team: end Kelly Mote; tackle Al DeRogatis; and guard Bill Milner. DeRogatis was later inducted into the College Football Hall of Fame.

Duke was ranked at No. 20 in the final Litkenhous Difference by Score System rankings for 1946.

== Schedule ==
Date	Opponent	Rank	Site	Result	Attendance	Source
September 28	at NC State		Riddick Stadium; Raleigh, NC (rivalry)	L 6–13	22,000	
October 5	Tennessee*		Duke Stadium; Durham, NC	L 7–12	42,000	
October 12	vs. Navy*		Baltimore Stadium; Baltimore MD	W 21–6	41,504	
October 19	Richmond*	No. 17	Duke Stadium; Durham, NC	W 41–0	10,000	
October 26	vs. No. 1 Army*	No. 13	Polo Grounds; New York, NY	L 0–19	59,031	
November 2	No. 16 Georgia Tech^{†}	No. 19	Duke Stadium; Durham, NC	L 0–14	38,000	
November 9	No. 13 Wake Forest		Duke Stadium; Durham, NC (rivalry)	W 13–0	25,000	
November 16	at South Carolina	No. 20	Carolina Stadium; Columbia, SC	W 39–0	18,000	
November 23	at No. 14 North Carolina		Kenan Memorial Stadium; Chapel Hill, NC (rivalry)	L 7–22	43,385	
*Non-conference game; ^{†}Homecoming; Rankings from AP Poll released prior to the game

== Rankings ==
Ranking movements Legend: ██ Increase in ranking ██ Decrease in ranking — = Not ranked
	Week								
Poll	1	2	3	4	5	6	7	8	Final
AP	—	17	13	19	—	20	—	—	—

== 1947 NFL draft ==
The 1947 NFL draft was held on December 16, 1946. The following Blue Devils were selected.

Round	Pick	Player	Position	NFL Club
14	117	Leo Long	Back	Boston Yanks
15	131	Buddy Mulligan	Back	Chicago Cardinals
25	228	Hal Mullins	Tackle	Washington Football Team
