= 1946 Miami Hurricanes football team =

American college football season

1946 Miami Hurricanes football
- Conference: Independent
- Record: 8–2
- Head coach: Jack Harding (8th season)
- Home stadium: Orange Bowl

1946 Southern major college football independents records
	Conf.			Overall
Team	W	L	T	W		L		T
Miami (FL)		–		8	–	2	–	0
Georgetown		–		5	–	3	–	0
Virginia		–		4	–	4	–	1
Chattanooga		–		5	–	5	–	0
West Virginia		–		5	–	5	–	0
Navy		–		1	–	8	–	0

The 1946 Miami Hurricanes football team was an American football team that represented the University of Miami as an independent during the 1946 college football season. In their eighth year under head coach Jack Harding, the Hurricanes compiled an 8–2 record and outscored opponents by a total of 200 to 147.

The November 29 game was originally scheduled to be against Penn State. That game was cancelled in early November by unanimous vote of the Penn State team. Miami officials felt that Penn State fielding their African American players Wallace Triplett and Dennis Hoggard in Miami could have led to "unfortunate incidents", and the team chose to cancel the game rather than playing without Triplett and Hoggard. Miami reportedly invited Syracuse to replace Penn State. This invitation was promptly declined and rebuked in an editorial in The Daily Orange, titled "No Thanks, Miami". Detroit was added to the schedule in replacement of Penn State in mid-November.

Miami was ranked at No. 39 in the final Litkenhous Difference by Score System rankings for 1946.

The team played its home games at Burdine Stadium in Miami.

== Schedule ==
Date	Opponent	Site	Result	Attendance	Source
September 27	William & Mary	Orange Bowl; Miami, FL	W 13–3	29,562	
October 4	North Carolina	Orange Bowl; Miami, FL	L 0–21	31,451	
October 11	TCU	Orange Bowl; Miami, FL	W 20–12	30,860	
October 19	at Florida	Florida Field; Gainesville, FL (rivalry)	W 20–13		
October 25	Chattanooga	Orange Bowl; Miami, FL	W 33–13	26,011	
November 1	at Villanova	Shibe Park; Philadelphia, PA	W 26–21	26,000	
November 8	Miami (OH)	Orange Bowl; Miami, FL	W 20–17	31,158	
November 15	No. 11 LSU	Orange Bowl; Miami, FL	L 7–20	33,504	
November 22	Washington and Lee	Orange Bowl; Miami, FL	W 40–20	24,419	
November 29	Detroit	Orange Bowl; Miami, FL	W 21–7	24,747	
Rankings from AP Poll released prior to the game

== After the season ==
The 1947 NFL draft was held on December 16, 1946. The following Hurricanes were selected.

Round	Pick	Player	Position	NFL club
7	51	Tony Yovicsin	End	Philadelphia Eagles
8	56	Harvey James	Center	Detroit Lions
9	72	Bob McDougal	Fullback	Green Bay Packers
