= 1946 The Citadel Bulldogs football team =

American college football season

1946 The Citadel Bulldogs football
- Conference: Southern Conference
- Record: 3–5 (1–5 SoCon)
- Head coach: J. Quinn Decker (1st season)
- Captain: Albert Salvato
- Home stadium: Johnson Hagood Stadium

1946 Southern Conference football standings
	Conf.					Overall
Team	W		L		T	W		L		T
No. 9 North Carolina $	4	–	0	–	1	8	–	2	–	1
William & Mary	7	–	1	–	0	8	–	2	–	0
No. 18 NC State	6	–	1	–	0	8	–	3	–	0
South Carolina	4	–	2	–	0	5	–	3	–	0
Duke	3	–	2	–	0	4	–	5	–	0
Richmond	3	–	2	–	2	6	–	2	–	2
VPI	3	–	3	–	2	3	–	4	–	3
VMI	2	–	3	–	1	4	–	5	–	1
George Washington	1	–	1	–	0	4	–	3	–	0
Clemson	2	–	3	–	0	4	–	5	–	0
Wake Forest	2	–	3	–	0	6	–	3	–	0
Maryland	2	–	5	–	0	3	–	6	–	0
Furman	1	–	4	–	0	2	–	8	–	0
Washington and Lee	1	–	4	–	0	2	–	6	–	0
The Citadel	1	–	5	–	0	3	–	5	–	0
Davidson	1	–	5	–	0	4	–	5	–	0
$ – Conference champion; Rankings from AP Poll

The 1946 The Citadel Bulldogs football team was an American football team that represented The Citadel, as a member of the Southern Conference (SoCon) during the 1946 college football season. In their first season under head coach J. Quinn Decker, the Bulldogs compiled a 3–5 record (1–5 against SoCon opponents) and were outscored by a total of 154 to 82. Albert Salvato was the team captain.

The 1946 season marked The Citadel's return to intercollegiate football after a three-year hiatus from 1943 to 1945 due to World War II.

The team played its home games at Johnson Hagood Stadium in Charleston, South Carolina.

== Schedule ==
Date	Opponent	Site	Result	Attendance	Source
September 28	Presbyterian*	Johnson Hagood Stadium; Charleston, SC	W 7–6		
October 5	William & Mary	Johnson Hagood Stadium; Charleston, SC	L 12–51		
October 12	at Newberry*	Setzler Field; Newberry, SC	W 28–7		
October 19	Furman	Johnson Hagood Stadium; Charleston, SC (rivalry)	L 0–14		
November 1	vs. South Carolina	County Fairgrounds; Orangeburg, SC	L 7–19	10,000	
November 9	George Washington	Johnson Hagood Stadium; Charleston, SC	L 0–18		
November 16	at VMI	Alumni Field; Lexington, VA (rivalry)	L 7–26		
November 23	vs. Davidson	American Legion Memorial Stadium; Charlotte, NC	W 21–13	5,000	
*Non-conference game
