= 1946 North Carolina Tar Heels football team =

American college football season

1946 North Carolina Tar Heels football

SoCon champion

Sugar Bowl, L 10–20 vs. Georgia
- Conference: Southern Conference

Ranking
- AP: No. 9
- Record: 8–2–1 (4–0–1 SoCon)
- Head coach: Carl Snavely (4th season)
- Offensive scheme: Single-wing
- Captains: Chan Highsmith; Ralph Strayhorn
- Home stadium: Kenan Memorial Stadium

1946 Southern Conference football standings
	Conf.					Overall
Team	W		L		T	W		L		T
No. 9 North Carolina $	4	–	0	–	1	8	–	2	–	1
William & Mary	7	–	1	–	0	8	–	2	–	0
No. 18 NC State	6	–	1	–	0	8	–	3	–	0
South Carolina	4	–	2	–	0	5	–	3	–	0
Duke	3	–	2	–	0	4	–	5	–	0
Richmond	3	–	2	–	2	6	–	2	–	2
VPI	3	–	3	–	2	3	–	4	–	3
VMI	2	–	3	–	1	4	–	5	–	1
George Washington	1	–	1	–	0	4	–	3	–	0
Clemson	2	–	3	–	0	4	–	5	–	0
Wake Forest	2	–	3	–	0	6	–	3	–	0
Maryland	2	–	5	–	0	3	–	6	–	0
Furman	1	–	4	–	0	2	–	8	–	0
Washington and Lee	1	–	4	–	0	2	–	6	–	0
The Citadel	1	–	5	–	0	3	–	5	–	0
Davidson	1	–	5	–	0	4	–	5	–	0
$ – Conference champion; Rankings from AP Poll

The 1946 North Carolina Tar Heels football team was an American football team that represented the University of North Carolina in the Southern Conference during the 1946 college football season. In their fourth year under head coach Carl Snavely, the Tar Heels compiled an 8–2–1 record (4–0–1 against Southern Conference opponents), won the conference title, and outscored opponents by a total of 271 to 129. They ranked ninth in the final AP Poll and were invited to the school's first bowl game, the 1947 Sugar Bowl, which they lost to Georgia.

The Tar Heels ranked seventh nationally in rushing with an average of 234.1 yards per game. The rushing attack was led by Charlie Justice who ranked third nationally with 943 rushing yards and averaged 7.20 yards per carry. Justice was inducted into the College Football Hall of Fame in 1961.

Five North Carolina players were honored by the Associated Press (AP) on the 1946 All-Southern Conference football team: Justice on the first team; tackle Ted Hazelwood and center Chan Highsmith on the second team; and guard Harry Varney and fullback Hosea Rodgers (third team).

The team played its home games at Kenan Memorial Stadium.

== Schedule ==
Date	Time	Opponent	Rank	Site	Result	Attendance	Source
September 28	2:30 p.m.	VPI		Kenan Memorial Stadium; Chapel Hill, NC	T 14–14	26,000	
October 4	8:15 p.m.	at Miami (FL)*		Burdine Stadium; Miami, FL	W 21–0	31,451	
October 12	2:30 p.m.	Maryland		Kenan Memorial Stadium; Chapel Hill, NC	W 33–0	15,000	
October 19	2:30 p.m.	at Navy*	No. 15	Municipal Stadium; Baltimore, MD	W 21–14	30,500	
October 26	2:30 p.m.	Florida^{†}*	No. 10	Kenan Memorial Stadium; Chapel Hill, NC	W 40–19	22,000	
November 2	2:00 p.m.	at No. 10 Tennessee*	No. 9	Shields–Watkins Field; Knoxville, TN	L 14–20	35,000	
November 9	2:00 p.m.	vs. William & Mary	No. 17	City Stadium; Richmond, VA	W 21–7	18,000	
November 16	2:00 p.m.	Wake Forest	No. 15	Kenan Memorial Stadium; Chapel Hill, NC (rivalry)	W 26–14	30,000	
November 23	2:00 p.m.	Duke	No. 14	Kenan Memorial Stadium; Chapel Hill, NC (rivalry)	W 22–7	44,000	
November 30	2:00 p.m.	at Virginia*	No. 11	Scott Stadium; Charlottesville, VA (South's Oldest Rivalry)	W 49–14	22,500	
January 1, 1947	3:00 p.m.	vs. No. 3 Georgia*	No. 9	Tulane Stadium; New Orleans, LA (Sugar Bowl)	L 10–20	73,300	
*Non-conference game; ^{†}Homecoming; Rankings from AP Poll released prior to the game; All times are in Eastern time

== Rankings ==
Ranking movements Legend: ██ Increase in ranking ██ Decrease in ranking — = Not ranked т = Tied with team above or below
	Week								
Poll	1	2	3	4	5	6	7	8	Final
AP	—	15	10	9	17т	15	14	11	9

== After the season ==
The 1947 NFL draft was held on December 16, 1946. The following Tar Heels were selected.

Round	Pick	Player	Position	NFL club
10	79	Ernie Williamson	Tackle	Washington Redskins
12	98	Jack Fitch	Back	Pittsburgh Steelers
18	165	Walt Pupa	Back	Chicago Bears
28	262	Jerrell Baxter	Tackle	Green Bay Packers
32	300	Don Clayton	Back	New York Giants
