= 1946 Dartmouth Indians football team =

American college football season

1946 Dartmouth Indians football
- Conference: Ivy League
- Record: 3–6 (1–6 Ivy)
- Head coach: Tuss McLaughry (4th season)
- Captain: Thomas Douglas
- Home stadium: Memorial Field

1946 Ivy Group football standings
	Conf.					Overall
Team	W		L		T	W		L		T
No. 12 Yale	4	–	1	–	1	7	–	1	–	1
Harvard	3	–	1	–	0	7	–	2	–	0
No. 13 Penn	3	–	1	–	0	6	–	2	–	0
Cornell	3	–	1	–	1	5	–	3	–	1
Columbia	2	–	2	–	0	6	–	3	–	0
Princeton	2	–	4	–	0	3	–	5	–	0
Brown	1	–	3	–	0	3	–	5	–	1
Dartmouth	1	–	6	–	0	3	–	6	–	0
Rankings from AP Poll

The 1946 Dartmouth Indians football team was an American football team that represented Dartmouth College in the Ivy League during the 1946 college football season. In their fourth season under head coach Tuss McLaughry, the Indians compiled a 3–6 record, and were outscored 194 to 91 by opponents. Thomas Douglas was the team captain.

Dartmouth was ranked at No. 81 in the final Litkenhous Difference by Score System rankings for 1946.

Dartmouth played its home games at Memorial Field on the college campus in Hanover, New Hampshire.

== Schedule ==
Date	Opponent	Site	Result	Attendance	Source
September 28	at Holy Cross*	Fitton Field; Worcester, MA	W 3–0	24,000	
October 5	Syracuse*	Memorial Field; Hanover, NH	W 20–14	10,000	
October 12	at No. 7 Penn	Franklin Field; Philadelphia, PA	L 6–39	69,000	
October 19	at Brown	Brown Stadium; Providence, RI	L 13–20	20,000	
October 26	Columbia	Memorial Field; Hanover, NH	L 13–33	13,000	
November 2	at Yale	Yale Bowl; New Haven, CT	L 2–33	66,000	
November 9	Harvard	Memorial Field; Hanover, NH (rivalry)	L 7–21	16,000	
November 16	at Cornell	Schoellkopf Field; Ithaca, NY (rivalry)	L 7–21	20,000	
November 23	at Princeton	Palmer Stadium; Princeton, NJ	W 20–13	34,000	
*Non-conference game; Rankings from AP Poll released prior to the game

== After the season ==
The 1947 NFL draft was held on December 16, 1946. The following Dartmouth Indian was selected.

Round	Pick	Player	Position	NFL club
27	249	Art Young	Guard	Pittsburgh Steelers
