= Lonnie McMillian =

American sports coach (1893–1975)

Biographical details
- Born: November 3, 1893; Nevada County, Arkansas, U.S.
- Died: May 15, 1975 (aged 81); Columbia, South Carolina, U.S.

Playing career

Football
- c. 1915–1920: Presbyterian

Basketball
- c. 1915–1921: Presbyterian

Track and field
- c. 1915–1921: Presbyterian
- Position: End (football)

Coaching career (HC unless noted)

Football
- 1922–1940: Presbyterian (assistant)
- 1941–1953: Presbyterian

Basketball
- 1930–1947: Presbyterian

Head coaching record
- Overall: 61–58–2 (football); 128–143 (basketball)

Accomplishments and honors

Championships
- Football; 1 SIAA (1941)

Lonnie Sexton McMillian Sr. (November 3, 1893 – May 15, 1975) was an American football, basketball, and track and field. coach. He served as the head football coach at Presbyterian College in Clinton, South Carolina, from 1941 to 1953, compiling a record of 61–58–2. He was also the head basketball coach at the school from 1930 to 1947, tallying a mark of 128–143, and coached Presbyterian track and field team for 31 years.

A native of Prescott, Arkansas, McMillian attended Prescott High School there. He entered Presbyterian College in 1915, the year that Walter A. Johnson was hired as the school's coach. McMillian was captain of the football, basketball, and track and field teams. His time at Presbyterian as interrupted by World War I, during which he enlisted in the United States Navy. McMillian died on May 15, 1975, at Veterans Hospital in Columbia, South Carolina.

== Head coaching record ==
=== Football ===
Year	Team	Overall	Conference	Standing	Bowl/playoffs
Presbyterian Blue Hose (Southern Intercollegiate Athletic Association) (1941)
1941	Presbyterian	6–3	5–0	1st	
Presbyterian Blue Hose (Independent) (1942–1945)
1942	Presbyterian	6–4			
1943	Presbyterian	6–6			
1944	Presbyterian	3–6			
1945	Presbyterian	1–6			
Presbyterian Blue Hose (South Carolina Little Four/Three) (1946–1953)
1946	Presbyterian	7–2	3–0	1st	
1947	Presbyterian	4–5–1			
1948	Presbyterian	5–4			
1949	Presbyterian	5–4			
1950	Presbyterian	5–5			
1951	Presbyterian	5–4			
1952	Presbyterian	3–6			
1953	Presbyterian	5–3–1		T–1st	
Presbyterian:		102–99–19	54–42–7		
Total:		102–99–19			
National championship Conference title Conference division title or championship game berth
