= 1946 Wake Forest Demon Deacons football team =

American college football season

1946 Wake Forest Demon Deacons football
- Conference: Southern Conference
- Record: 6–3 (2–3 SoCon)
- Head coach: Peahead Walker (10th season)
- Captain: Game captains
- Home stadium: Groves Stadium

1946 Southern Conference football standings
	Conf.					Overall
Team	W		L		T	W		L		T
No. 9 North Carolina $	4	–	0	–	1	8	–	2	–	1
William & Mary	7	–	1	–	0	8	–	2	–	0
No. 18 NC State	6	–	1	–	0	8	–	3	–	0
South Carolina	4	–	2	–	0	5	–	3	–	0
Duke	3	–	2	–	0	4	–	5	–	0
Richmond	3	–	2	–	2	6	–	2	–	2
VPI	3	–	3	–	2	3	–	4	–	3
VMI	2	–	3	–	1	4	–	5	–	1
George Washington	1	–	1	–	0	4	–	3	–	0
Clemson	2	–	3	–	0	4	–	5	–	0
Wake Forest	2	–	3	–	0	6	–	3	–	0
Maryland	2	–	5	–	0	3	–	6	–	0
Furman	1	–	4	–	0	2	–	8	–	0
Washington and Lee	1	–	4	–	0	2	–	6	–	0
The Citadel	1	–	5	–	0	3	–	5	–	0
Davidson	1	–	5	–	0	4	–	5	–	0
$ – Conference champion; Rankings from AP Poll

The 1946 Wake Forest Demon Deacons football team was an American football team that represented Wake Forest University during the 1946 college football season. In its tenth season under head coach Peahead Walker, the team compiled a 6–3 record and finished in a tie for tenth place in the Southern Conference.

Wake Forest quarterback Nick Sacrinty ranked seventh nationally with 822 passing yards and fourth with 12 interceptions. End Red O'Quinn ranked third nationally with 29 pass receptions.

Wake Forest was ranked at No. 34 in the final Litkenhous Difference by Score System rankings for 1946.

== Schedule ==
Date	Opponent	Rank	Site	Result	Attendance	Source
September 27	at Boston College*		Braves Field; Boston, MA	W 12–6	38,500	
October 4	at Georgetown*		Griffith Stadium; Washington, DC	W 19–6	15,837	
October 12	Clemson		Groves Stadium; Wake Forest, NC	W 19–7	9,000	
October 19	NC State		Groves Stadium; Wake Forest, NC (rivalry)	L 6–14	22,000	
October 26	at No. 4 Tennessee*		Shields–Watkins Field; Knoxville, TN	W 19–6	25,000	
November 1	at Chattanooga*	No. 12	Chamberlain Field; Chattanooga, TN	W 32–14	9,000	
November 9	at Duke	No. 13	Duke Stadium; Durham, NC (rivalry)	L 0–13	25,000	
November 16	at No. 15 North Carolina		Kenan Memorial Stadium; Chapel Hill, NC (rivalry)	L 14–28	30,000	
November 28	vs. South Carolina		American Legion Memorial Stadium; Charlotte, NC	W 35–0	17,000	
*Non-conference game; Rankings from AP Poll released prior to the game

== Rankings ==
Ranking movements Legend: ██ Increase in ranking ██ Decrease in ranking — = Not ranked
	Week								
Poll	1	2	3	4	5	6	7	8	Final
AP	—	—	—	12	13	—	—	—	—

== After the season ==
The 1947 NFL draft was held on December 16, 1946. The following Demon Deacons were selected.

Round	Pick	Player	Position	NFL club
9	71	Bob Leonetti	Guard	Philadelphia Eagles
10	80	Ulysses Cornogg	Tackle	Philadelphia Eagles
18	164	Dick Brinkley	Back	New York Giants
19	168	Harry Dowda	Defensive back	Washington Redskins
27	248	Otis Sacrinty	Back	Washington Redskins
