= 1946 Navy Midshipmen football team =

American college football season

1946 Navy Midshipmen football
- Conference: Independent
- Record: 1–8
- Head coach: Tom Hamilton (4th season)
- Captain: Leon Bramlett
- Home stadium: Thompson Stadium; Municipal Stadium

1946 Southern major college football independents records
	Conf.			Overall
Team	W	L	T	W		L		T
Miami (FL)		–		8	–	2	–	0
Georgetown		–		5	–	3	–	0
Virginia		–		4	–	4	–	1
Chattanooga		–		5	–	5	–	0
West Virginia		–		5	–	5	–	0
Navy		–		1	–	8	–	0

The 1946 Navy Midshipmen football team represented the United States Naval Academy during the 1946 college football season. With the return Tom Hamilton, head coach from 1934 to 1936, the Midshipmen compiled a 1–8 record and were outscored by their opponents by a combined score of 186 to 105.

Navy was ranked at No. 32 in the final Litkenhous Difference by Score System rankings for 1946.

== Schedule ==
Date	Opponent	Site	Result	Attendance	Source
September 28	Villanova	Thompson Stadium; Annapolis, MD	W 7–0	18,502	
October 5	at Columbia	Baker Field; New York, NY	L 14–23	35,000	
October 12	Duke	Municipal Stadium; Baltimore, MD	L 6–21	41,504	
October 19	North Carolina	Municipal Stadium; Baltimore, MD	L 14–21	30,500	
October 26	at No. 6 Penn	Franklin Field; Philadelphia, PA	L 19–32	78,000	
November 2	No. 2 Notre Dame	Municipal Stadium; Baltimore, MD (rivalry)	L 0–28	65,000	
November 9	at No. 8 Georgia Tech	Grant Field; Atlanta, GA	L 20–28	32,000	
November 16	Penn State	Thompson Stadium; Annapolis, MD	L 7–12	22,000	
November 30	vs. No. 1 Army	Philadelphia Municipal Stadium; Philadelphia, PA (Army–Navy Game)	L 18–21	102,000	
Rankings from AP Poll released prior to the game

== After the season ==
The 1947 NFL draft was held on December 16, 1946. The following Midshipmen were selected.

Round	Pick	Player	Position	NFL club
10	81	Bob Kelly	Halfback	Green Bay Packers
11	94	Robert Hoernschemeyer	Back	New York Giants
28	264	Jim Carrington	Guard	New York Giants
