= Jimmy Kitts =

American athlete and coach

- Kitts, c. 1940

Biographical details
- Born: June 14, 1900; Dallas County, Texas, U.S.
- Died: December 13, 1952 (aged 52); El Paso, Texas, U.S.

Playing career

Football
- 1918–1921: SMU

Basketball
- 1919–1922: SMU

Coaching career (HC unless noted)

Football
- 1924–1925: Dallas
- 1926–1929: Athens HS (TX)
- 1931–1933: Rice (freshmen)
- 1934–1939: Rice
- 1941: VPI
- 1943–1944: Ottumwa NAS
- 1946–1947: VPI

Basketball
- 1923–1926: Dallas
- 1926–1929: Athens HS (TX)
- 1932–1938: Rice

Baseball

Head coaching record
- Overall: 65–52–9 (college football); 75–73 (college basketball); 26–15 (college baseball)
- Bowls: 1–1

Accomplishments and honors

Championships
- Football; 2 SWC (1934, 1937); Basketball; SWC (1935)

James Roland Kitts (June 14, 1900 – December 13, 1952) was an American football, basketball, and baseball player and coach. He served as head football coach at the University of Dallas from 1924 to 1925, Rice Institute—now known as Rice University–from 1934 to 1939, and at Virginia Polytechnic Institute (VPI)—now known as Virginia Tech—in 1941 and from 1946 to 1947. Kitts was also the head basketball coach at Rice from 1932 to 1938, tallying a mark of 58–56, and the head baseball coach at Dallas from 1924 to 1926 amassing a record of 26–15. Kitts was inducted into the Texas Sports Hall of Fame in 1956.

== Coaching career ==
Kitts was hired as the head football coach at the University of Dallas in December 1923.

From 1934 to 1939, Kitts coached at Rice, and compiled a 33–29–4 record. His 1934 team went 9–1–1, however his 1939 team went 1–9–1.

== Death ==
Kitts died on December 13, 1952, in El Paso, Texas.

== Head coaching record ==
=== College football ===
Year	Team	Overall	Conference	Standing	Bowl/playoffs	AP^{#}
Dallas Hilltoppers (Independent) (1924–1925)
1924	Dallas	4–3–1				
1925	Dallas	7–2–1				
Dallas:		11–5–2				
Rice Owls (Southwest Conference) (1934–1939)
1934	Rice	9–1–1	5–1	1st		
1935	Rice	8–3	3–3	T–3rd		
1936	Rice	5–7	1–5	T–6th		
1937	Rice	6–3–2	4–1–1	1st	W Cotton	18
1938	Rice	4–6	3–3	4th		
1939	Rice	1–9–1	0–5–1	7th		
Rice:		33–29–4	16–18–2			
VPI Gobblers (Southern Conference) (1941)
1941	VPI	6–4	4–2	T–5th		
Ottumwa Naval Air Station Skyers (Independent) (1943–1944)
1943	Ottumwa NAS	5–1				
1944	Ottumwa NAS	3–4				
Ottumwa NAS:		8–5				
VPI Gobblers (Southern Conference) (1946–1947)
1946	VPI	3–4–3	3–3–2	T–7th	L Sun	
1947	VPI	4–5	4–3	8th		
VPI:		13–13–3	11–8–2			
Total:		65–52–9				
National championship Conference title Conference division title or championship game berth
^{#}Rankings from final AP Poll.

== See also ==
- List of college football head coaches with non-consecutive tenure
