= 1946 William & Mary Indians football team =

American college football season

1946 William & Mary Indians football
- Conference: Southern Conference
- Record: 8–2 (7–1 SoCon)
- Head coach: Rube McCray (3rd season)
- Captain: Denver Mills
- Home stadium: Cary Field

1946 Southern Conference football standings
	Conf.					Overall
Team	W		L		T	W		L		T
No. 9 North Carolina $	4	–	0	–	1	8	–	2	–	1
William & Mary	7	–	1	–	0	8	–	2	–	0
No. 18 NC State	6	–	1	–	0	8	–	3	–	0
South Carolina	4	–	2	–	0	5	–	3	–	0
Duke	3	–	2	–	0	4	–	5	–	0
Richmond	3	–	2	–	2	6	–	2	–	2
VPI	3	–	3	–	2	3	–	4	–	3
VMI	2	–	3	–	1	4	–	5	–	1
George Washington	1	–	1	–	0	4	–	3	–	0
Clemson	2	–	3	–	0	4	–	5	–	0
Wake Forest	2	–	3	–	0	6	–	3	–	0
Maryland	2	–	5	–	0	3	–	6	–	0
Furman	1	–	4	–	0	2	–	8	–	0
Washington and Lee	1	–	4	–	0	2	–	6	–	0
The Citadel	1	–	5	–	0	3	–	5	–	0
Davidson	1	–	5	–	0	4	–	5	–	0
$ – Conference champion; Rankings from AP Poll

The 1946 William & Mary Indians football team was an American football team that represented the College of William & Mary as a member of the Southern Conference (SoCon) during the 1946 college football season. In their third season under head coach Rube McCray, the Indians compiled an 8–2 record (7–1 against SoCon opponents), finished in second place in the SoCon, and outscored all opponents by a total of 347 to 71.

William & Mary ranked third nationally among major colleges in scoring offense with 34.7 point per game. They also ranked 11th nationally in total offense with an average of 338.3 yards per game. On defense, the team ranked ninth in scoring defense (7.1 point per game), and 15th in total defense.

Guard Knox Ramsey, younger brother of Buster Ramsey, was selected by both the Associated Press (AP) and United Press (UP) as a first-team player on the 1946 All-Southern Conference football team. Ramsey also received third-team honors from the AP on the 1946 All-America college football team. He was praised for his ability to get out of the line fast to lead interference and for his exceptional downfield blocking.

Back Jack Cloud led the team, and ranked 23rd nationally, in scoring with 66 points on 11 touchdowns. Cloud also received first-team honors from the AP and UP on the 1946 All-Southern Conference team. Others receiving all-conference honors were back Tommy Korczowski (AP-3, UP-2), end Robert Steckroth (AP-2, UP-3), tackle Ralph Sazio (AP-2), and center Tommy Thompson (AP-3).

William & Mary was ranked at No. 30 in the final Litkenhous Difference by Score System rankings for 1946.

== Schedule ==
Date	Opponent	Rank	Site	Result	Attendance	Source
September 21	Fort McClellan*		Cary Field; Williamsburg VA	W 61–0	5,000	
September 27	at Miami (FL)*		Burdine Stadium; Miami, FL	L 3–13	29,562	
October 5	at The Citadel		Johnson Hagood Stadium; Charleston, SC	W 51–12		
October 12	VPI		Cary Field; Williamsburg, VA	W 49–0	14,000–15,000	
October 19	vs. Washington and Lee	No. 19	Victory Stadium; Roanoke, VA	W 34–18	9,000	
October 26	VMI^{†}	No. 18	Cary Field; Williamsburg, VA (rivalry)	W 41–0		
November 2	Maryland		Cary Field; Williamsburg, VA	W 41–7		
November 9	vs. No. 17 North Carolina		City Stadium; Richmond, VA	L 7–21	18,000	
November 16	at George Washington		Griffith Stadium; Washington, DC	W 20–0		
November 28	at Richmond		City Stadium; Richmond, VA (rivalry)	W 40–0	17,500	
*Non-conference game; ^{†}Homecoming; Rankings from AP Poll released prior to the game

== Rankings ==
Ranking movements Legend: ██ Increase in ranking ██ Decrease in ranking — = Not ranked
	Week								
Poll	1	2	3	4	5	6	7	8	Final
AP	—	19	18	—	—	—	—	—	—

== NFL draft selections ==
= Pro Football Hall of Fame	= Canadian Football Hall of Fame	= College Football Hall of Fame

NFL Draft Selections

#	Year	Round	Pick	Overall	Name	Team	Position
14	1947	13	2	108	Bob Steckroth	Washington Redskins	End
15	1947	28	3	258	Ralph Sazio	Pittsburgh Steelers	Tackle
