= 1946 VPI Gobblers football team =

American college football season

1946 VPI Gobblers football

Sun Bowl, L 6–18 vs. Cincinnati
- Conference: Southern Conference
- Record: 3–4–3 (3–3–2 SoCon)
- Head coach: Jimmy Kitts (2nd season)
- Captain: William Elmer Wilson
- Home stadium: Miles Stadium

1946 Southern Conference football standings
	Conf.					Overall
Team	W		L		T	W		L		T
No. 9 North Carolina $	4	–	0	–	1	8	–	2	–	1
William & Mary	7	–	1	–	0	8	–	2	–	0
No. 18 NC State	6	–	1	–	0	8	–	3	–	0
South Carolina	4	–	2	–	0	5	–	3	–	0
Duke	3	–	2	–	0	4	–	5	–	0
Richmond	3	–	2	–	2	6	–	2	–	2
VPI	3	–	3	–	2	3	–	4	–	3
VMI	2	–	3	–	1	4	–	5	–	1
George Washington	1	–	1	–	0	4	–	3	–	0
Clemson	2	–	3	–	0	4	–	5	–	0
Wake Forest	2	–	3	–	0	6	–	3	–	0
Maryland	2	–	5	–	0	3	–	6	–	0
Furman	1	–	4	–	0	2	–	8	–	0
Washington and Lee	1	–	4	–	0	2	–	6	–	0
The Citadel	1	–	5	–	0	3	–	5	–	0
Davidson	1	–	5	–	0	4	–	5	–	0
$ – Conference champion; Rankings from AP Poll

The 1946 VPI Gobblers football team was an American football team that represented Virginia Polytechnic Institute as a member of the Southern Conference (SoCon) during the 1946 college football season. In their second year under head coach Jimmy Kitts, the Gobblers compiled a 3–4–3 record (3–3–2 against SoCon opponents), lost to Cincinnati in the 1947 Sun Bowl, and were outscored by a total of 149 to 102.

During the 1946 season, VPI defeated the No. 12 NC State Wolfpack for the first win over an Associated Press (AP) Top 25 team in school history, the Washington and Lee Generals, and the Gobblers' traditional rivals, the VMI Keydets.

The 1946 season also included VPI's first post-season bowl appearance, in the 1947 Sun Bowl in El Paso, Texas against the Cincinnati Bearcats. VPI was the third choice after Border Conference champions, Hardin–Simmons, and runner-up, Texas Tech, both declined the bowl invitation. VPI lost the game, 18–6.

Tackle John Maskas was selected by both the AP and United Press (UP) as a first-team player on the 1946 All-Southern Conference football team.

VPI was ranked at No. 83 in the final Litkenhous Difference by Score System rankings for 1946.

== Schedule ==
Date	Time	Opponent	Site	Result	Attendance	Source
September 28	2:30 p.m.	at North Carolina	Kenan Memorial Stadium; Chapel Hill, NC	T 14–14	26,000	
October 5		vs. Virginia*	Victory Stadium; Roanoke, VA (rivalry)	T 21–21	20,000	
October 12		at William & Mary	Cary Field; Williamsburg, VA	L 0–49	14,000–15,000	
October 18		at Maryland	Byrd Stadium; College Park, MD	L 0–6	11,500–13,000	
October 26	2:30 p.m.	No. 12 NC State^{†}	Miles Stadium; Blacksburg, VA	W 14–6	11,500–13,000	
November 2		Clemson	Miles Stadium; Blacksburg, VA	L 7–14	7,000	
November 9		vs. Washington and Lee	Municipal Stadium; Lynchburg, VA	W 13–7	12,000	
November 16	2:30 p.m.	at Richmond	City Stadium; Richmond, VA	T 7–7	11,000	
November 28		vs. VMI	Victory Stadium; Roanoke, VA (rivalry)	W 20–7	24,000–28,000	
January 1, 1947		vs. Cincinnati*	Kidd Field; El Paso, TX (Sun Bowl)	L 6–18	10,000	
*Non-conference game; ^{†}Homecoming; Rankings from AP Poll released prior to the game; All times are in Eastern time

== Game summaries ==
=== 1947 Sun Bowl ===
VPI vs. Cincinnati

Team	1	2	3	4	Total
VPI	0	0	0	6	6
• Cincinnati	0	0	12	6	18

- Date: January 1, 1947
- Location: Kidd Field
  El Paso, Texas
- Game attendance: 10,000

During VPI's preparations before its departure for El Paso, heavy snow fell on Blacksburg, Virginia, forcing the team to use snowplows and construction equipment to clear a space for the team to practice. The Gobblers traveled to El Paso without star punter and rusher Bobby Smith, who had been injured in Virginia Tech's final regular-season game.

The game was played in extremely cold and icy conditions, still the worst in Sun Bowl history. Three inches of snow fell on top of a layer of frozen rain the day before the game, and at kickoff the teams took the field under cloudy skies and in below-freezing temperatures. Despite the inclement weather, 15,000-seat Kidd Field was approximately half full, and bowl officials estimated the crowd at around 10,000 people.

Weather conditions allowed both teams' defenses to dominate in the first half. VPI had the best chance to score of either team in the first half when it drove to a first down inside the Cincinnati two-yard line late in the first quarter. On four straight running plays, however, the Bearcats' defense held, and VPI was denied a scoring opportunity.

In the second half, however, Cincinnati's offense managed to begin moving the ball effectively. On Cincinnati's first play of the second half, halfback Roger Stephens broke through the VPI defensive line for 26 yards, taking the ball inside VPI territory. Cincinnati's drive would overcome two 15-yard penalties and one five-yard penalty en route to a touchdown just a few plays later. On its next possession, Cincinnati's All-American Roger Stephens again broke off another long run, this time for 19 yards, setting up another Bearcats' touchdown. VPI countered with a long drive that reached the Cincinnati 23-yard line before an errant pass was intercepted by the Bearcats in the end zone. VPI managed a defensive stop, however, and marched down the field for a touchdown to climb within six points. Cincinnati sealed its victory, however, when Bearcats' halfback Harold Johnson intercepted a VPI pass late in the fourth quarter, returning it all the way to the VPI 25-yard line. That return set up a Cincinnati touchdown and put the Bearcats up by the game's final score, 18–6.

== Roster ==
The following players were members of the 1946 football team according to the roster published in the 1947 edition of The Bugle, the Virginia Tech yearbook.

VPI 1946 roster
Jim Adams; Frank H. Ballard; William "Billy" Shelby Barbour; Ralph Coe Beard; Raymond Rucker Beasley; Floyd Samuel Bowles; Maynard Leon David Bruce; Thomas Craig Burns; Coy Lenard Chambers; Pete "Chip" Collum; Jack Cooke; Stuart Covington; Billy Patrick DeNardo; Frank DeNardo; Richard T. DeShazo; Charles Mugler Forbes	Nelson T. Fuller; John E. "Jack" Gallagher; John Eugene Gerngross; Robert Hess; Joseph William Hoffmann Jr.; Oren Edward Hopkins; Jack Ross Ittner; Cary Kenyon Johnson; Robert Edward Johnson; Ted James Johnson; Robert Stewart Kilbourne; John Harry Kroehling; Carl Leonard; John James Maskas; Allen McClaugherty; Augustus Paul Mengulas; Ross Moore Orr	Horace Lee Pearce; Erving Hascall Rand; Frank Ransome; Fred Ovid Shanks; Bobby Smith; Peter Smith; Warren William Squires; Robert "Bob" Taylor; Franklin Ray Taylor; David Lacy Thomas; Jack Thomas; W. Harry Walton; Robert Franklin Webb; Wegman; William Elmer Wilson (Capt.); Gerhard Charles Zekert; Paul Ethan "Zig" Zender
