= Beattie Feathers =

American football player and sports coach (1910–1979)

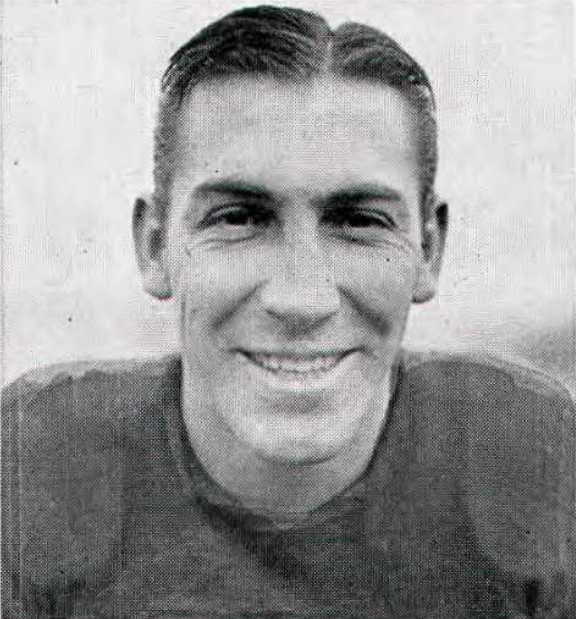
- Feathers from 1933 Volunteer

No. 48, 44, 3
- Position: Halfback

Personal information
- Born: August 20, 1909; Bristol, Virginia, U.S.
- Died: March 11, 1979 (aged 69); Winston-Salem, North Carolina, U.S.
- Listed height: 5 ft 10 in (1.78 m)
- Listed weight: 185 lb (84 kg)

Career information
- High school: Virginia (Bristol, Virginia)
- College: Tennessee (1931–1933)

Career history

Playing
- Chicago Bears (1934–1937); Brooklyn Dodgers (1938–1939); Green Bay Packers (1940)

Coaching
- Football: Appalachian State (1942) Head coach; NC State (1944–1951) Head coach; Texas Tech (1954–1960) Assistant coach; Wake Forest (1961–1977) Assistant coach; Baseball: NC State (1945) Head coach; Texas Tech (1954–1960) Head coach; Wake Forest (1972–1975) Head coach

Awards and highlights
- First-team All-Pro (1934); Second-team All-Pro (1936); NFL rushing yards leader (1934); NFL rushing touchdowns co-leader (1934); NFL 1930s All-Decade Team; 100 greatest Bears of all-time; SoCon champion (1932); SEC Player of the Year (1933); Consensus All-American (1933); Third-team All-American (1932); First-team All-Southern (1932); First-team All-SEC (1933)

Career NFL statistics
- Rushing yards: 1,980
- Rushing attempts: 378
- Rushing average: 5.2
- Rushing touchdowns: 16
- Receiving yards: 243
- Receptions: 15
- Yards per reception: 16.2
- Receiving touchdowns: 1
- Stats at Pro Football Reference

Head coaching record
- Career: 42–40–4 (football); 79–135–1 (baseball)

William Beattie "Big Chief" Feathers (August 20, 1909 – March 11, 1979) was an American football player and coach of football and baseball. He played college football and college basketball at the University of Tennessee and had a seven-year career in the National Football League (NFL) playing for the Chicago Bears and two other teams.

Feathers is remembered for his 1934 rookie season in the NFL when he became the first player in league history to gain more than 1,000 yards rushing in a single year.

== Early life and college career ==
Feathers attended Virginia High School, in Bristol, Virginia, and led the school to its first state championship as team captain before going on to the University of Tennessee.

He starred as a halfback from 1931 to 1933 for the Tennessee Volunteers football team led by head coach Robert Neyland. Feathers was a consensus selection to the 1933 College Football All-America Team. In December 2008, Sports Illustrated undertook to identify the individuals who would have been awarded the Heisman Trophy in college football's early years, before the trophy was established in 1935. Feathers was selected as the would-be Heisman winner for the 1933 season.

== NFL career ==
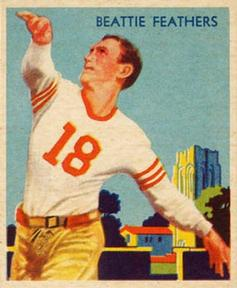

Feathers played professional football in the National Football League (NFL) with the Chicago Bears, Brooklyn Dodgers, and Green Bay Packers from 1934 to 1940. In his rookie season of 1934 he became the first player in NFL history to rush for over 1,000 yards in one season. His average of 8.44 yards per attempt that same year remains an NFL record (minimum 100 carries). He also, as of 2024, is the only NFL player to have outrun the passing leader in a single season (he outran passing leader Arnie Herber by 205 yards that season). As of 2024, his 91.3 yards per game is also a Bears rookie franchise record. Feathers is one of ten players named to the National Football League 1930s All-Decade Team who have not been inducted into the Pro Football Hall of Fame.

== Coaching career ==
After his career in the NFL, Feathers coached college football and college baseball. He served as the head football coach at Appalachian State Teachers College—now known as Appalachian State University—in 1942 and at North Carolina State University from 1944 to 1951, compiling a career college football coaching record of 42–40–4. Feathers was the head baseball coach at NC State in 1945, at Texas Tech University from 1954 to 1960, and at Wake Forest University from 1972 to 1975, tallying a career college baseball coaching mark of 79–135–1.

Feathers was inducted into the College Football Hall of Fame as a player in 1955. He was inducted into the Virginia Sports Hall of Fame in 1981. He stood 5'10" and 180 pounds.

== Head coaching record ==
=== Football ===
Year	Team	Overall	Conference	Standing	Bowl/playoffs	AP^{#}
Appalachian State Mountaineers (North State Conference) (1942)
1942	Appalachian State	5–2–1	2–2	2nd		
Appalachian State:		5–2–1	2–2			
NC State Wolfpack (Southern Conference) (1944–1951)
1944	NC State	7–2	3–1	T–3rd		
1945	NC State	3–6	2–4	8th		
1946	NC State	8–3	6–1	3rd	L Gator	18
1947	NC State	5–3–1	3–2–1	T–6th		17
1948	NC State	3–6–1	1–4–1	14th		
1949	NC State	3–7	3–6	13th		
1950	NC State	5–4–1	4–4–1	T–9th		
1951	NC State	3–7	2–6	T–12th		
NC State:		37–38–3	24–28–3			
Total:		42–40–4				
^{#}Rankings from final AP Poll.

== See also ==
- List of NCAA major college football yearly scoring leaders
