= 1946 NC State Wolfpack football team =

American college football season

1946 NC State Wolfpack football

Gator Bowl, L 13–34 vs. Oklahoma
- Conference: Southern Conference

Ranking
- AP: No. 18
- Record: 8–3 (6–1 SoCon)
- Head coach: Beattie Feathers (3rd season)
- Home stadium: Riddick Stadium

1946 Southern Conference football standings
	Conf.					Overall
Team	W		L		T	W		L		T
No. 9 North Carolina $	4	–	0	–	1	8	–	2	–	1
William & Mary	7	–	1	–	0	8	–	2	–	0
No. 18 NC State	6	–	1	–	0	8	–	3	–	0
South Carolina	4	–	2	–	0	5	–	3	–	0
Duke	3	–	2	–	0	4	–	5	–	0
Richmond	3	–	2	–	2	6	–	2	–	2
VPI	3	–	3	–	2	3	–	4	–	3
VMI	2	–	3	–	1	4	–	5	–	1
George Washington	1	–	1	–	0	4	–	3	–	0
Clemson	2	–	3	–	0	4	–	5	–	0
Wake Forest	2	–	3	–	0	6	–	3	–	0
Maryland	2	–	5	–	0	3	–	6	–	0
Furman	1	–	4	–	0	2	–	8	–	0
Washington and Lee	1	–	4	–	0	2	–	6	–	0
The Citadel	1	–	5	–	0	3	–	5	–	0
Davidson	1	–	5	–	0	4	–	5	–	0
$ – Conference champion; Rankings from AP Poll

The 1946 NC State Wolfpack football team was an American football team that represented North Carolina State College of Agriculture and Engineering (later renamed North Carolina State University) as a member of the Southern Conference (SoCon) during the 1946 college football season. In its third season under head coach Beattie Feathers, the team compiled an 8–3 record (6–1 against SoCon opponents), was ranked No. 18 in the final AP Poll, lost to Oklahoma in the 1947 Gator Bowl, and outscored opponents by a total of 226 to 101.

NC State was ranked at No. 35 in the final Litkenhous Difference by Score System rankings for 1946.

== Schedule ==
Date	Time	Opponent	Rank	Site	Result	Attendance	Source
September 28		Duke		Riddick Stadium; Raleigh, NC (rivalry)	W 13–6	22,000	
October 5		at Clemson		Memorial Stadium; Clemson, SC (rivalry)	W 14–7	15,000	
October 12		Davidson	No. 19	Riddick Stadium; Raleigh, NC	W 25–0	18,000	
October 19		at Wake Forest		Groves Stadium; Wake Forest, NC	W 14–6	22,000	
October 26	2:30 p.m.	at VPI	No. 12	Miles Stadium; Blacksburg, VA	L 6–14	13,000	
November 2		vs. VMI		Victory Stadium; Roanoke, VA	W 49–7	6,000	
November 9		at Vanderbilt*	No. 20	Dudley Field; Nashville, TN	L 0–7	17,500	
November 16		Virginia^{†}*		Riddick Stadium; Raleigh, NC	W 27–7	18,000	
November 23		at Florida*		Phillips Field; Tampa, FL	W 37–6	14,500	
November 30		Maryland		Riddick Stadium; Raleigh, NC	W 28–7	16,000	
January 1, 1947		vs. No. 14 Oklahoma*	No. 18	Fairfield Stadium; Jacksonville, FL (Gator Bowl)	L 13–34	17,000	
*Non-conference game; ^{†}Homecoming; Rankings from AP Poll released prior to the game

== Rankings ==
Ranking movements Legend: ██ Increase in ranking ██ Decrease in ranking — = Not ranked т = Tied with team above or below
	Week								
Poll	1	2	3	4	5	6	7	8	Final
AP	19т	—	12	—	20	—	—	—	18

== After the season ==
The 1947 NFL draft was held on December 16, 1946. The following Wolfpack players were selected.

Round	Pick	Player	Position	NFL club
7	50	Howard Turner	Back	Chicago Cardinals
10	78	Paul Gibson	End	Pittsburgh Steelers
22	200	George Blomquist	End	Philadelphia Eagles
