= 1946 Yale Bulldogs football team =

American college football season

1946 Yale Bulldogs football
- Conference: Ivy League

Ranking
- AP: No. 12
- Record: 7–1–1 (4–1–1 Ivy)
- Head coach: Howie Odell (5th season)
- Captain: Richard M. Hollingshead III
- Home stadium: Yale Bowl

1946 Ivy Group football standings
	Conf.					Overall
Team	W		L		T	W		L		T
No. 12 Yale	4	–	1	–	1	7	–	1	–	1
Harvard	3	–	1	–	0	7	–	2	–	0
No. 13 Penn	3	–	1	–	0	6	–	2	–	0
Cornell	3	–	1	–	1	5	–	3	–	1
Columbia	2	–	2	–	0	6	–	3	–	0
Princeton	2	–	4	–	0	3	–	5	–	0
Brown	1	–	3	–	0	3	–	5	–	1
Dartmouth	1	–	6	–	0	3	–	6	–	0
Rankings from AP Poll

The 1946 Yale Bulldogs football team represented Yale University in the Ivy League during the 1946 college football season. The Bulldogs were led by fifth-year head coach Howie Odell, finished the season with a 7–1–1 record, and were ranked No. 12 in the final AP Poll (No. 21 in the final Litkenhous Difference by Score System rankings). Two Yale players received first-team honors from the Associated Press (AP) or International News Service (INS) on the 1946 All-Eastern football team: halfback Levi Jackson (AP-2, INS-1); and guard Fritz Barzilauskas (AP-1; INS-1). Jackson led Yale and ranked fifth nationally with 806 rushing yards and averaged 6.01 yards per carry.

== Schedule ==
Date	Opponent	Rank	Site	Result	Attendance	Source
September 28	Merchant Marine*		Yale Bowl; New Haven, CT	W 33–0	21,000	
October 5	Colgate*		Yale Bowl; New Haven, CT	W 27–6	38,000	
October 12	No. 11 Columbia	No. 15	Yale Bowl; New Haven, CT	L 20–28	65,000	
October 19	at Cornell		Schoellkopf Field; Ithaca, NY	T 6–6	27,000	
October 26	Coast Guard*		Yale Bowl; New Haven, CT	W 47–14	10,000	
November 2	Dartmouth		Yale Bowl; New Haven, CT	W 33–2	66,000	
November 9	Brown		Yale Bowl; New Haven, CT	W 49–0	40,000	
November 16	Princeton	No. 18	Yale Bowl; New Haven, CT (rivalry)	W 30–2	70,000	
November 23	at Harvard	No. 15	Harvard Stadium; Boston, MA (The Game)	W 27–14	57,300	
*Non-conference game; Rankings from AP Poll released prior to the game

== Rankings ==
Ranking movements Legend: ██ Increase in ranking ██ Decrease in ranking — = Not ranked
	Week								
Poll	1	2	3	4	5	6	7	8	Final
AP	15	—	—	—	—	18	15	12	12

== After the season ==
The 1947 NFL draft was held on December 16, 1946. The following Bulldogs were selected.

Round	Pick	Player	Position	NFL club
1	3	Fritz Barzilauskas	Guard	Boston Yanks
30	277	John Prchlik	Defensive tackle	Boston Yanks
31	292	Bill Schuler	Tackle	New York Giants
