= 1946 Cornell Big Red football team =

American college football season

1946 Cornell Big Red football
- Conference: Ivy League
- Record: 5–3–1 (3–1–1 Ivy)
- Head coach: Edward McKeever (2nd season)
- Captain: Joe Martin
- Home stadium: Schoellkopf Field

1946 Ivy Group football standings
	Conf.					Overall
Team	W		L		T	W		L		T
No. 12 Yale	4	–	1	–	1	7	–	1	–	1
Harvard	3	–	1	–	0	7	–	2	–	0
No. 13 Penn	3	–	1	–	0	6	–	2	–	0
Cornell	3	–	1	–	1	5	–	3	–	1
Columbia	2	–	2	–	0	6	–	3	–	0
Princeton	2	–	4	–	0	3	–	5	–	0
Brown	1	–	3	–	0	3	–	5	–	1
Dartmouth	1	–	6	–	0	3	–	6	–	0
Rankings from AP Poll

The 1946 Cornell Big Red football team was an American football team that represented Cornell University in the Ivy League during the 1946 college football season. In its second season under head coach Edward McKeever, the team compiled a 5–4 record and outscored its opponents 135 to 115. Joe Martin was the team captain.

Walter Kretz led Cornell and ranked 17th nationally with 602 rushing yards and averaged 6.76 yards per carry. Hillary Chollet was the team's leading scorer.

Cornell was ranked at No. 38 in the final Litkenhous Difference by Score System rankings for 1946.

Cornell played its home games at Schoellkopf Field in Ithaca, New York.

== Schedule ==
Date	Opponent	Site	Result	Attendance	Source
September 28	Bucknell	Schoellkopf Field; Ithaca, NY	W 21–0	7,000	
October 5	at Army	Michie Stadium; West Point, NY	L 21–46	26,000	
October 12	Colgate	Schoellkopf Field; Ithaca, NY (rivalry)	W 13–9	20,000	
October 19	Yale	Schoellkopf Field; Ithaca, NY	T 6–6	27,000	
October 26	at Princeton	Palmer Stadium; Princeton, NJ	W 14–7	33,000	
November 2	at Columbia	Baker Field; New York, NY (rivalry)	W 12–0	35,000	
November 9	Syracuse	Schoellkopf Field; Ithaca, NY	L 7–14	29,000	
November 16	Dartmouth	Schoellkopf Field; Ithaca, NY (rivalry)	W 21–7	20,000	
November 28	at No. 14 Penn	Franklin Field; Philadelphia, PA (rivalry)	L 20–26	78,000	
Rankings from AP Poll released prior to the game

== After the season ==
The 1947 NFL draft was held on December 16, 1946. The following Big Red was selected.

Round	Pick	Player	Position	NFL club
5	29	Frank Wydo	Tackle	Pittsburgh Steelers
