= 1946 Clemson Tigers football team =

American college football season

1946 Clemson Tigers football
- Conference: Southern Conference
- Record: 4–5 (2–3 SoCon)
- Head coach: Frank Howard (7th season)
- Captain: Chip Clark
- Home stadium: Memorial Stadium

1946 Southern Conference football standings
	Conf.					Overall
Team	W		L		T	W		L		T
No. 9 North Carolina $	4	–	0	–	1	8	–	2	–	1
William & Mary	7	–	1	–	0	8	–	2	–	0
No. 18 NC State	6	–	1	–	0	8	–	3	–	0
South Carolina	4	–	2	–	0	5	–	3	–	0
Duke	3	–	2	–	0	4	–	5	–	0
Richmond	3	–	2	–	2	6	–	2	–	2
VPI	3	–	3	–	2	3	–	4	–	3
VMI	2	–	3	–	1	4	–	5	–	1
George Washington	1	–	1	–	0	4	–	3	–	0
Clemson	2	–	3	–	0	4	–	5	–	0
Wake Forest	2	–	3	–	0	6	–	3	–	0
Maryland	2	–	5	–	0	3	–	6	–	0
Furman	1	–	4	–	0	2	–	8	–	0
Washington and Lee	1	–	4	–	0	2	–	6	–	0
The Citadel	1	–	5	–	0	3	–	5	–	0
Davidson	1	–	5	–	0	4	–	5	–	0
$ – Conference champion; Rankings from AP Poll

The 1946 Clemson Tigers football team was an American football team that represented Clemson College during the 1946 college football season. In its seventh season under head coach Frank Howard, the team compiled a 4–5 record (2–3 against conference opponents), tied for 10th place in the conference, and were outscored by a total of 174 to 147. The team played its home games at Memorial Stadium in Clemson, South Carolina.

Left end Chip Clark was the team captain. The team's statistical leaders included tailback Dutch Leverman with 501 passing yards, tailback Bobby Gage with 264 rushing yards, and Leverman and Clark with 24 points scored (4 touchdowns each).

Three Clemson players were selected as first-team players on the 1946 All-South Carolina football team: end Chip Clark; guard Frank Gillespie; and tailback Bobby Gage.

Clemson was ranked at No. 80 in the final Litkenhous Difference by Score System rankings for 1946.

== Schedule ==
Date	Opponent	Site	Result	Attendance	Source
September 21	Presbyterian*	Memorial Stadium; Clemson, SC	W 39–0	12,000	
September 27	at Georgia*	Sanford Stadium; Athens, GA (rivalry)	L 12–35	35,000	
October 5	NC State	Memorial Stadium; Clemson, SC (rivalry)	L 7–14	15,000	
October 12	Wake Forest	Groves Stadium; Wake Forest, NC	L 7–19	9,000	
October 24	at South Carolina	Carolina Stadium; Columbia, SC (rivalry)	L 14–26	30,000	
November 2	at VPI	Miles Stadium; Blacksburg, VA	W 14–7	7,000	
November 9	at Tulane*	Tulane Stadium; New Orleans, LA	L 13–54	25,301	
November 16	Furman^{†}	Memorial Stadium; Clemson, SC	W 20–6	18,000	
November 23	at Auburn*	Cramton Bowl; Montgomery, AL (rivalry)	W 21–13	8,000	
*Non-conference game; ^{†}Homecoming

== After the season ==
The 1947 NFL draft was held on December 16, 1946. The following Tiger was selected.

Round	Pick	Player	Position	NFL club
16	138	Ralph Jenkins	Center	Pittsburgh Steelers
