= 1946 Richmond Spiders football team =

American college football season

1946 Richmond Spiders football
- Conference: Southern Conference
- Record: 6–2–2 (3–2–2 SoCon)
- Head coach: John Fenlon (2nd season)
- Home stadium: City Stadium

1946 Southern Conference football standings
	Conf.					Overall
Team	W		L		T	W		L		T
No. 9 North Carolina $	4	–	0	–	1	8	–	2	–	1
William & Mary	7	–	1	–	0	8	–	2	–	0
No. 18 NC State	6	–	1	–	0	8	–	3	–	0
South Carolina	4	–	2	–	0	5	–	3	–	0
Duke	3	–	2	–	0	4	–	5	–	0
Richmond	3	–	2	–	2	6	–	2	–	2
VPI	3	–	3	–	2	3	–	4	–	3
VMI	2	–	3	–	1	4	–	5	–	1
George Washington	1	–	1	–	0	4	–	3	–	0
Clemson	2	–	3	–	0	4	–	5	–	0
Wake Forest	2	–	3	–	0	6	–	3	–	0
Maryland	2	–	5	–	0	3	–	6	–	0
Furman	1	–	4	–	0	2	–	8	–	0
Washington and Lee	1	–	4	–	0	2	–	6	–	0
The Citadel	1	–	5	–	0	3	–	5	–	0
Davidson	1	–	5	–	0	4	–	5	–	0
$ – Conference champion; Rankings from AP Poll

The 1946 Richmond Spiders football team was an American football team that represented the University of Richmond as a member of the Southern Conference (SoCon) during the 1946 college football season. In their second year under head coach John Fenlon, the Spiders compiled a 6–2–2 record (3–2–2 against SoCon opponents), finished in sixth place in the SoCon, and outscored opponent by a total of 196 to 121. The team played its home games at City Stadium in Richmond, Virginia.

== Schedule ==
Date	Opponent	Site	Result	Attendance	Source
September 21	Randolph–Macon*	City Stadium; Richmond, VA	W 46–0	9,000	
September 28	VMI	City Stadium; Richmond, VA (rivalry)	T 7–7	13,000	
October 4	at Maryland	Byrd Stadium; College Park, MD	W 37–7	11,500	
October 12	Hampden–Sydney*	City Stadium; Richmond, VA	W 33–6	3,000	
October 19	at No. 17 Duke	Duke Stadium; Durham, NC	L 0–41	10,000	
October 26	at Washington and Lee	Wilson Field; Lexington, VA	W 20–0	8,000	
November 2	Virginia*	City Stadium; Richmond, VA	W 19–7	13,000	
November 9	at Davidson	Richardson Stadium; Davidson, NC	W 27–6	3,000	
November 16	VPI	City Stadium; Richmond, VA	T 7–7		
November 28	William & Mary	City Stadium; Richmond, VA (rivalry)	L 0–40	17,500	
*Non-conference game; Rankings from AP Poll released prior to the game
