= 1946 Little All-America college football team =

American college football all-star team

The 1946 Little All-America college football team is composed of college football players from small colleges and universities who were selected by the Associated Press (AP) as the best players at each position. For 1946, the AP selected first, second, and third teams.

== First-team ==
Position	Player	Team
B	Gene Roberts	Chattanooga
B	Rudy Mobley	Hardin–Simmons
B	Phil Colella	St. Bonaventure
B	Hank Caver	Presbyterian
E	George Bibighaus	Muhlenberg
E	Marvin Goodman	Willamette
T	Robert Hawkins	Evansville
T	Tony Stalloni	Delaware
G	Mike Reed	Louisiana Tech
G	Bert Vanderclute	Wesleyan (CT)
C	Cliff Rothrock	North Dakota Agricultural

== Second-team ==
Position	Player	Team
B	Larry Bruno	Geneva
B	Darwin Horne	Pepperdine
B	Ray Ramsey	Bradley
B	Joe Lustic	Morehead State
E	Harry Dickson	Idaho Southern Branch
E	Ted Chittwood	Missouri Valley
T	Nelson Schofield	Newberry
T	Ray Yagiello	Catawba
G	Victor Pederson	Gustavus Adolphus
G	John Zollo	Maine
C	Don Anderson	Cape Girardeau

== Third-team ==
Position	Player	Team
B	Andy Victory	Oklahoma City
B	Gerald Doherty	Delaware
B	A. L. Camarata	Iowa State Teachers
B	Arthur Pollard	Arizona
E	Jack Coleman	Louisville
E	Mel Harms	Upper Iowa
T	Ralph Hollywood	Austin
T	Bo Stewart	Chattanooga
G	Frank Burke	New Mexico A&M
G	Dwaine Lyon	West Texas State
C	Norman Parent	Bates

== See also ==
- 1946 College Football All-America Team
