= 1946 Georgetown Hoyas football team =

American college football season

1946 Georgetown Hoyas football
- Conference: Independent
- Record: 5–3
- Head coach: Jack Hagerty (12th season)
- Captain: Game captains
- Home stadium: Griffith Stadium

1946 Southern major college football independents records
	Conf.			Overall
Team	W	L	T	W		L		T
Miami (FL)		–		8	–	2	–	0
Georgetown		–		5	–	3	–	0
Virginia		–		4	–	4	–	1
Chattanooga		–		5	–	5	–	0
West Virginia		–		5	–	5	–	0
Navy		–		1	–	8	–	0

The 1946 Georgetown Hoyas football team was an American football team that represented Georgetown University as an independent during the 1946 college football season. In their 12th season under head coach Jack Hagerty, the Hoyas compiled a 5–3 record and outscored opponents by a total of 115 to 97.

Georgetown was ranked at No. 95 in the final Litkenhous Difference by Score System rankings for 1946.

The team played its home games at Griffith Stadium in Washington, D.C.

== Schedule ==
Date	Opponent	Site	Result	Attendance	Source
October 4	Wake Forest	Griffith Stadium; Washington, DC	L 6–19	15,837	
October 11	Fordham	Griffith Stadium; Washington, DC	W 8–7	15,252	
October 20	at Villanova	Shibe Park; Philadelphia, PA	L 2–19	22,000	
October 27	at Saint Louis	Walsh Stadium; St. Louis, MO	W 13–7	15,896	
November 2	at George Washington	Griffith Stadium; Washington, DC	W 18–6	16,556	
November 9	at Boston College	Braves Field; Boston, MA	L 13–20	19,800	
November 16	Scranton	Griffith Stadium; Washington, DC	W 36–7	3,642	
November 23	at NYU	Yankee Stadium; Bronx, NY	W 19–12	10,000	
