= 1946 Maryland Terrapins football team =

American college football season

1946 Maryland Terrapins football
- Conference: Southern Conference
- Record: 3–6 (2–5 SoCon)
- Head coach: Clark Shaughnessy (1st season)
- Offensive scheme: T formation
- Captain: Game captains
- Home stadium: Byrd Stadium (original)

1946 Southern Conference football standings
	Conf.					Overall
Team	W		L		T	W		L		T
No. 9 North Carolina $	4	–	0	–	1	8	–	2	–	1
William & Mary	7	–	1	–	0	8	–	2	–	0
No. 18 NC State	6	–	1	–	0	8	–	3	–	0
South Carolina	4	–	2	–	0	5	–	3	–	0
Duke	3	–	2	–	0	4	–	5	–	0
Richmond	3	–	2	–	2	6	–	2	–	2
VPI	3	–	3	–	2	3	–	4	–	3
VMI	2	–	3	–	1	4	–	5	–	1
George Washington	1	–	1	–	0	4	–	3	–	0
Clemson	2	–	3	–	0	4	–	5	–	0
Wake Forest	2	–	3	–	0	6	–	3	–	0
Maryland	2	–	5	–	0	3	–	6	–	0
Furman	1	–	4	–	0	2	–	8	–	0
Washington and Lee	1	–	4	–	0	2	–	6	–	0
The Citadel	1	–	5	–	0	3	–	5	–	0
Davidson	1	–	5	–	0	4	–	5	–	0
$ – Conference champion; Rankings from AP Poll

The 1946 Maryland Terrapins football team was an American football team that represented the University of Maryland as a member of the Southern Conference (SoCon) during the 1946 college football season. In their second non-consecutive season under head coach Clark Shaughnessy, the Terrapins compiled a 3–6 record (2–5 against SoCon opponents) and were outscored by a total of 193 to 136.

== Schedule ==
Date	Opponent	Site	Result	Attendance	Source
September 28	Bainbridge*	Byrd Stadium; College Park, MD	W 54–0	12,000	
October 4	Richmond	Byrd Stadium; College Park, MD	L 7–37	11,500	
October 12	at North Carolina	Kenan Memorial Stadium; Chapel Hill, NC	L 0–33	15,000	
October 18	VPI	Byrd Stadium; College Park, MD	W 6–0	11,500–13,000	
November 2	at William & Mary	Cary Field; Williamsburg, VA	L 7–41		
November 9	South Carolina	Byrd Stadium; College Park, MD	L 17–21		
November 16	vs. Washington & Lee	Memorial Stadium; Baltimore, MD	W 24–7	7,000	
November 23	at Michigan State*	Macklin Field; East Lansing, MI	L 14–26	16,239	
November 30	at NC State	Riddick Stadium; Raleigh, NC	L 7–28	16,000	
*Non-conference game

== Roster ==
The Maryland roster for the 1946 season consisted of the following players:

- Robert Andrus
- Randolph Bishop
- Harry Bonk
- Paul Broglio
- Eddie Chovanes
- Robert Crosland
- Fred Davis
- Joseph Drach
- Francis Evans
- Walter Fehr
- Emile Fritz
- Lu Gambino
- Jim Goodman
- Fred Jackson
- Robert James
- Richard Johnston
- Eugene Kinney
- Jim Kurz
- Paul Massey
- Patrick McCarthy
- Tommy Mont
- LaRoy Morter
- Al Phillips
- Bill Poling
- Edward Schwarz
- Vernon Seibert
- Emmett Shaughnessy
- George Simler
- Bernie Sniscak
- Adam Stuart
- Vic Turyn
- Jack Wright

== After the season ==
The 1947 NFL Draft was held on December 16, 1946. The following Terrapin was selected.

Round	Pick	Player	Position	NFL Club
13	115	Emile Fritz	Guard	Chicago Bears

== See also ==
- Maryland Terrapins football: 1856–1946
