= 1946 George Washington Colonials football team =

American college football season

1946 George Washington Colonials football
- Conference: Southern Conference
- Record: 4–3 (1–1 SoCon)
- Head coach: Skip Stahley (1st season)
- Home stadium: Griffith Stadium

1946 Southern Conference football standings
	Conf.					Overall
Team	W		L		T	W		L		T
No. 9 North Carolina $	4	–	0	–	1	8	–	2	–	1
William & Mary	7	–	1	–	0	8	–	2	–	0
No. 18 NC State	6	–	1	–	0	8	–	3	–	0
South Carolina	4	–	2	–	0	5	–	3	–	0
Duke	3	–	2	–	0	4	–	5	–	0
Richmond	3	–	2	–	2	6	–	2	–	2
VPI	3	–	3	–	2	3	–	4	–	3
VMI	2	–	3	–	1	4	–	5	–	1
George Washington	1	–	1	–	0	4	–	3	–	0
Clemson	2	–	3	–	0	4	–	5	–	0
Wake Forest	2	–	3	–	0	6	–	3	–	0
Maryland	2	–	5	–	0	3	–	6	–	0
Furman	1	–	4	–	0	2	–	8	–	0
Washington and Lee	1	–	4	–	0	2	–	6	–	0
The Citadel	1	–	5	–	0	3	–	5	–	0
Davidson	1	–	5	–	0	4	–	5	–	0
$ – Conference champion; Rankings from AP Poll

The 1946 George Washington Colonials football team was an American football team that represented George Washington University as part of the Southern Conference during the 1946 college football season. In their first season under head coach Skip Stahley, the team compiled a 4–3 record (1–1 in the SoCon).

== Schedule ==
Date	Opponent	Site	Result	Attendance	Source
October 5	at Merchant Marine*	Tomb Memorial Field; Great Neck, NY	W 37–18		
October 11	at Rollins*	Orlando Stadium; Orlando, FL	W 13–0	8,000	
October 19	Wayne*	Griffith Stadium; Washington, DC	W 20–6	8,000	
October 26	at Rutgers*	Rutgers Stadium; Piscataway, NJ	L 13–25	8,000	
November 2	Georgetown*	Griffith Stadium; Washington, DC	L 6–18		
November 9	at The Citadel	Johnson Hagood Stadium; Charleston, SC	W 18–0		
November 16	William & Mary	Griffith Stadium; Washington, DC	L 0–20	11,626	
*Non-conference game
