= Gene Roberts (American football) =

American gridiron football player (1923–2009)

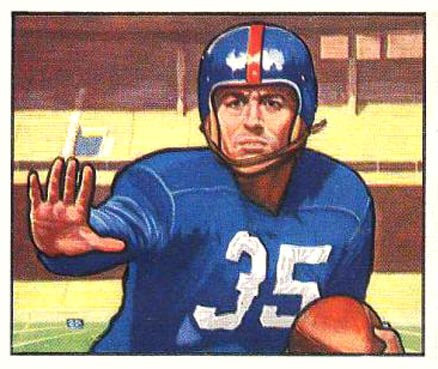

No. 35, 52, 81
- Positions: Halfback, fullback

Personal information
- Born: January 20, 1923; Kansas, U.S.
- Died: July 6, 2009 (aged 86); Independence, Missouri, U.S.
- Listed height: 5 ft 11 in (1.80 m)
- Listed weight: 188 lb (85 kg)

Career information
- High school: East (Kansas City, Missouri)
- College: Kansas (1942); Chattanooga (1945-1946)
- NFL draft: 1946: 8th round, 65th overall pick

Career history
- New York Giants (1947–1950); Montreal Alouettes (1951); Ottawa Rough Riders (1952–1954)

Awards and highlights
- Second-team All-Pro (1949); Pro Bowl (1950); NFL scoring leader (1949); 2× East All-Star (1952, 1953); First-team Little All-American (1946)

Career NFL statistics
- Rushing yards: 1,904
- Rushing average: 3.8
- Receptions: 64
- Receiving yards: 1,135
- Total touchdowns: 26
- Stats at Pro Football Reference

Eugene O. "Choo-Choo" Roberts (January 20, 1923 – July 6, 2009) was an American professional football player who was a halfback for the New York Giants of the National Football League (NFL) from 1947 to 1950. Roberts played college football for the Chattanooga Mocs, leading the NCAA in scoring in 1946 with 117 points. He set the NFL's and the New York Giants' single-game rushing record with 218 yards on November 12, 1950, against the Chicago Cardinals. The NFL record was broken by Thomas Wilson of the Los Angeles Rams on December 16, 1956. The Giants' single-game rushing record stood for over 55 years until it was broken by Tiki Barber on December 17, 2005.

Roberts left the Giants in 1950 and played in the Interprovincial Rugby Football Union (IRFU) for the Montreal Alouettes in 1951 and the Ottawa Rough Riders from 1952 to 1954.

Roberts is the only person to lead the NCAA, the NFL (102 points in 1949) and the Canadian pro leagues (88 points in 1953) in scoring.

== NFL career statistics ==
Legend
	Led the league
**Bold**	Career high

=== Regular season ===
Year	Team	Games		Rushing					Receiving				
Year	Team	GP	GS	Att	Yds	Avg	Lng	TD	Rec	Yds	Avg	Lng	TD
1947	NYG	9	0	86	296	3.4	46	1	4	58	14.5	30	0
1948	NYG	11	1	145	491	3.4	27	0	14	222	15.9	49	3
1949	NYG	12	10	**152**	**634**	**4.2**	**63**	**9**	**35**	**711**	**20.3**	**85**	**8**
1950	NYG	12	10	116	483	**4.2**	62	4	11	144	13.1	47	1
Career		44	21	499	1,904	3.8	63	14	64	1,135	17.7	85	12

=== Playoffs ===
Year	Team	Games		Rushing					Receiving				
Year	Team	GP	GS	Att	Yds	Avg	Lng	TD	Rec	Yds	Avg	Lng	TD
1950	NYG	1	0	12	76	6.3	32	0	1	17	17.0	17	0
Career		44	21	499	1,904	3.8	63	14	64	1,135	17.7	85	12

== See also ==
- List of NCAA major college football yearly scoring leaders
