= 1946 Brown Bears football team =

American college football season

1946 Brown Bears football
- Conference: Ivy League
- Record: 3–5–1 (1–3 Ivy)
- Head coach: Rip Engle (3rd season)
- Captain: J. Lalikos
- Home stadium: Brown Stadium

1946 Ivy Group football standings
	Conf.					Overall
Team	W		L		T	W		L		T
No. 12 Yale	4	–	1	–	1	7	–	1	–	1
Harvard	3	–	1	–	0	7	–	2	–	0
No. 13 Penn	3	–	1	–	0	6	–	2	–	0
Cornell	3	–	1	–	1	5	–	3	–	1
Columbia	2	–	2	–	0	6	–	3	–	0
Princeton	2	–	4	–	0	3	–	5	–	0
Brown	1	–	3	–	0	3	–	5	–	1
Dartmouth	1	–	6	–	0	3	–	6	–	0
Rankings from AP Poll

The 1946 Brown Bears football team was an American football team that represented Brown University in the Ivy League during the 1946 college football season.

In their third season under head coach Charles "Rip" Engle, the Bears compiled a 3–5–1 record, and were outscored 184 to 122 by opponents. J. Lalikos was the team captain.

Brown played its home games at Brown Stadium in Providence, Rhode Island.

== Schedule ==
Date	Opponent	Site	Result	Attendance	Source
September 28	Canisius*	Brown Stadium; Providence, RI	W 14–6	12,716	
October 5	at Princeton	Palmer Stadium; Princeton, NJ	L 12–33	16,000	
October 12	Rhode Island State*	Brown Stadium; Providence, RI (rivalry)	W 29–0	20,000	
October 19	Dartmouth	Brown Stadium; Providence, RI	W 20–13	20,000	
October 26	Boston University*	Brown Stadium; Providence, RI	T 14–14	12,000	
November 2	at Holy Cross*	Fitton Field; Worcester, MA	L 19–21	15,000	
November 9	at Yale	Yale Bowl; New Haven, CT	L 0–49	40,000	
November 16	at Harvard	Harvard Stadium; Boston, MA	L 0–28	20,000	
November 28	Colgate*	Brown Stadium; Providence, RI	L 14–20	20,000	
*Non-conference game

== After the season ==
The 1947 NFL draft was held on December 16, 1946. The following Bear was selected.

Round	Pick	Player	Position	NFL club
24	222	Tom Dorsey	Back	Chicago Cardinals
