= 1946 Washington and Lee Generals football team =

American football team

1946 Washington and Lee Generals football
- Conference: Southern Conference
- Record: 2–6 (1–4 SoCon)
- Head coach: Art Lewis (1st season)
- Home stadium: Wilson Field

1946 Southern Conference football standings
| | Conf. | | | | | Overall |
| Team | W | | L | | T | W | | L | | T |
|---|---|---|---|---|---|---|---|---|---|---|
| No. 9 North Carolina $ | 4 | – | 0 | – | 1 | 8 | – | 2 | – | 1 |
| William & Mary | 7 | – | 1 | – | 0 | 8 | – | 2 | – | 0 |
| No. 18 NC State | 6 | – | 1 | – | 0 | 8 | – | 3 | – | 0 |
| South Carolina | 4 | – | 2 | – | 0 | 5 | – | 3 | – | 0 |
| Duke | 3 | – | 2 | – | 0 | 4 | – | 5 | – | 0 |
| Richmond | 3 | – | 2 | – | 2 | 6 | – | 2 | – | 2 |
| VPI | 3 | – | 3 | – | 2 | 3 | – | 4 | – | 3 |
| VMI | 2 | – | 3 | – | 1 | 4 | – | 5 | – | 1 |
| George Washington | 1 | – | 1 | – | 0 | 4 | – | 3 | – | 0 |
| Clemson | 2 | – | 3 | – | 0 | 4 | – | 5 | – | 0 |
| Wake Forest | 2 | – | 3 | – | 0 | 6 | – | 3 | – | 0 |
| Maryland | 2 | – | 5 | – | 0 | 3 | – | 6 | – | 0 |
| Furman | 1 | – | 4 | – | 0 | 2 | – | 8 | – | 0 |
| Washington and Lee | 1 | – | 4 | – | 0 | 2 | – | 6 | – | 0 |
| The Citadel | 1 | – | 5 | – | 0 | 3 | – | 5 | – | 0 |
| Davidson | 1 | – | 5 | – | 0 | 4 | – | 5 | – | 0 |
$ – Conference champion; Rankings from AP Poll

The 1946 Washington and Lee Generals football team was an American football team that represented Washington and Lee University as a member of the Southern Conference during the 1946 college football season. In its first season under head coach Art Lewis, the team compiled a 2–6 record (1–4 against conference opponents), finished in a tie for 13th place in the conference, and was outscored by a total of 149 to 118.

The team played its home games at Wilson Field in Lexington, Virginia.

== Schedule ==
| Date | Opponent | Site | Result | Attendance | Source |
|---|---|---|---|---|---|
| October 5 | Hampden–Sydney* | Wilson Field; Lexington, VA | W 41–6 | 3,000 | |
| October 12 | vs. West Virginia* | Charleston, WV | L 0–6 | | |
| October 19 | vs. No. 19 William & Mary | Victory Stadium; Roanoke, VA | L 18–34 | 9,000 | |
| October 26 | Richmond^{†} | Wilson Field; Lexington, VA | L 0–20 | 8,000 | |
| November 2 | at Davidson | Davidson, NC | W 25–6 | | |
| November 9 | vs. VPI | Municipal Stadium; Lynchburg, VA | L 7–13 | 12,000 | |
| November 16 | vs. Maryland | Memorial Stadium; Baltimore, MD | L 7–24 | 7,000 | |
| November 22 | at Miami (FL)* | Orange Bowl; Miami, FL | L 20–40 | 24,419 | |
*Non-conference game; ^{†}Homecoming; Rankings from AP Poll released prior to the game
