= 1946 Southern California Conference football season =

- Sport: Football
- Teams: 5
- Champion: Redlands

Football seasons
- 1945 1947

1946 Southern California Conference football standings
| | Conf. | | | | | Overall |
| Team | W | | L | | T | W | | L | | T |
|---|---|---|---|---|---|---|---|---|---|---|
| Redlands $ | 2 | – | 0 | – | 2 | 4 | – | 2 | – | 2 |
| Whittier | 2 | – | 1 | – | 1 | 3 | – | 5 | – | 1 |
| Pomona | 1 | – | 1 | – | 2 | 1 | – | 5 | – | 2 |
| Occidental | 1 | – | 2 | – | 1 | 1 | – | 4 | – | 2 |
| Caltech | 1 | – | 3 | – | 0 | 2 | – | 4 | – | 0 |
$ – Conference champion

The 1946 Southern California Conference football season was the season of college football played by the five member schools of the Southern California Conference (SCC) as part of the 1946 college football season.

The Redlands Bulldogs won the SCC championship with a 4–2–2 record (2–0–2 against conference opponents).

== Conference overview ==
| Conf. rank | Team | Head coach | Conf. record | Overall record | Points scored | Points against |
|---|---|---|---|---|---|---|
| 1 | Redlands | Cecil A. Cushman | 2–0–2 | 4–2–2 | 130 | 66 |
| 2 | Whittier | Wallace Newman | 2–1–1 | 3–5–1 | 83 | 114 |
| 3 | Pomona | Earl J. Merritt | 1–1–2 | 1–5–2 | 56 | 124 |
| 4 | Occidental | Roy Dennis | 1–2–1 | 1–4–2 | 44 | 73 |
| 5 | Caltech | Mason Anderson | 1–3 | 2–4 | 86 | 110 |

== Teams ==
=== Redlands ===
1946 Redlands Bulldogs football

SCC champion
- Conference: Southern California Conference
- Record: 4–2–2 (2–0–2 SCC)
- Head coach: Cecil A. Cushman (14th season)
- Home stadium: Orange Show Stadium

The 1946 Redlands Bulldogs football team that represented the University of Redlands of Redlands, California. In their 14th season under head coach Cecil A. Cushman, the team compiled a 4–2–2 record (2–0–2 against SCC opponents). Ed Hales and Jim Verdieck were assistant coaches.

Nine Redlands players received first- or second-team honors on the 1946 All-Southern California Athletic Conference football team: back J. Lloyd (1st); end Homer Richards (1st); center John Hoffman (1st); tackle Keith Broader (1st); back Ted Runner (2nd); end Stan Flowers (2nd); end Pete Masonis (2nd); guard Mack Hammond (2nd); and guard Ted Duncan (2nd).

The team played its home games at Orange Show Stadium in San Bernardino, California.

| Date | Opponent | Site | Result | Attendance | Source |
|---|---|---|---|---|---|
| October 5 | La Verne* | Orange Show Stadium; San Bernardino, CA | W 46–0 | | |
| October 12 | Pepperdine* | Orange Show Stadium; San Bernardino, CA | L 7–20 | 5,000 | |
| October 19 | Occidental | Orange Show Stadium; San Bernardino, CA | W 6–0 | | |
| October 25 | at Loyola (Los Angeles)* | Gilmore Stadium; Los Angeles, CA | L 9–14 | 6,000 | |
| November 2 | at Pomona | Claremont, CA | T 6–6 | | |
| November 8 | at Caltech | Rose Bowl; Pasadena, CA | W 21–6 | 5,000 | |
| November 16 | at San Diego NTS* | San Diego, CA | W 28–13 | | |
| November 23 | Whittier | Orange Show Stadium; San Bernardino, CA | T 7–7 | | |
*Non-conference game

=== Whittier ===
1946 Whittier Poets football
- Conference: Southern California Conference
- Record: 3–5–1 (2–1–1 SCC)
- Head coach: Wallace Newman (15th season)
- Home stadium: Hadley Field

The 1946 Whittier Poets football team that represented Whittier College of Whittier, California. In their 15th season under head coach Wallace Newman, the team compiled a 3–5–1 record (2–1–1 against SCC opponents), finished in second place in the SCC, and were outscored by a total of 114 to 83.

| Date | Opponent | Site | Result | Attendance | Source |
|---|---|---|---|---|---|
| September 28 | Pepperdine* | Hadley Field; Whittier, CA | L 0–13 | | |
| October 12 | San Diego State* | Hadley Field; Whittier, CA | L 7–35 | | |
| October 19 | at Pomona | Alumni Field; Pomona, CA | W 18–6 | 4,000 | |
| October 26 | at Cal Poly* | Mustang Stadium; San Luis Obispo, CA | L 2–13 | | |
| November 2 | Caltech | Whittier, CA | W 19–7 | | |
| November 9 | Occidental | Whittier, CA | L 6–7 | | |
| November 16 | Willamette* | Whittier, CA | W 18–13 | 4,000 | |
| November 23 | Redlands | Orange Show Stadium; San Bernardino, CA | T 7–7 | | |
| November 29 | Loyola (Los Angeles)* | Gilmore Stadium; Los Angeles, CA | L 6–13 | 3,500 | \ |
*Non-conference game

=== Pomona ===
1946 Pomona Sagehens football
- Conference: Southern California Conference
- Record: 1–5–2 (1–1–2 SCC)
- Head coach: Earl J. Merritt (10th season)

The 1946 Pomona Sagehens football team that represented Pomona College of Pomona, California. In their 10th season under head coach Earl J. Merritt, the Sagehens compiled a 1–5–2 record (1–1–2 against SCC opponents), finished in third place in the SCC, and were outscored by a total of 124 to 56.

| Date | Opponent | Site | Result | Attendance | Source |
|---|---|---|---|---|---|
| September 28 | at San Diego State* | Balboa Stadium; San Diego, CA | L 0–34 | 10,000 | |
| October 4 | Mt. San Antonio* | Pomona High School Field; Pomona, CA | L 6–20 | | |
| October 11 | at Loyola (Los Angeles)* | Gilmore Stadium; Los Angeles, CA | L 0–13 | 6,000 | |
| October 19 | Whittier | Alumni Field; Pomona, CA | L 6–18 | 4,000 | |
| October 26 | Pepperdine | Claremont Alumni Field; Claremont, CA | L 6–19 | | |
| November 2 | Redlands | Claremont, CA | T 6–6 | | |
| November 16 | Caltech^{†} | Alumni Field; Pomona, CA | W 32–14 | | |
| November 23 | at Occidental | Patterson Field; Los Angeles, CA | T 0–0 | 5,000 | |
*Non-conference game; ^{†}Homecoming

=== Occidental ===
1946 Occidental Tigers football
- Conference: Southern California Conference
- Record: 1–4–2 (1–2–1 SCC)
- Head coach: Roy Dennis (10th season)
- Home stadium: Patterson Field

The 1946 Occidental Tigers football team that represented Occidental College of Los Angeles, California. In their 10th season under head coach Roy Dennis, the Tigers compiled a 1–4–2 record (1–2–1 against SCC opponents), finished in fourth place in the SCC, and were outscored by a total of 73 to 44.

| Date | Opponent | Site | Result | Attendance | Source |
|---|---|---|---|---|---|
| October 12 | at Cal Poly* | Mustang Stadium; San Luis Obispo, CA | T 7–7 | | |
| October 19 | at Redlands | Orange Show Stadium; San Bernardino, CA | L 0–6 | | |
| October 25 | at Caltech | Rose Bowl; Pasadena, CA | L 6–19 | 5,500 | |
| November 2 | at San Diego State* | Balboa Stadium; San Diego, CA | L 12–21 | 7,500 | |
| November 9 | at Whittier | Whittier, CA | W 7–6 | | |
| November 15 | at Loyola (Los Angeles) | Gilmore Stadium; Los Angeles, CA | L 12–14 | 4,000 | |
| November 23 | Pomona^{†} | Patterson Field; Los Angeles, CA | T 0–0 | 5,000 | |
*Non-conference game; ^{†}Homecoming

=== Caltech ===
1946 Caltech Beavers football
- Conference: Southern California Conference
- Record: 2–4 (1–3 SCC)
- Head coach: Mason Anderson (3rd season)

The 1946 Caltech Beavers football team that represented the California Institute of Technology of Pasadena, California. Led by third-year head coach Mason Anderson, the Beavers compiled a 2–4 record (1–3 against SCC opponents), finished in last place in the SCC, and were outscored by a total of 110 to 86.

| Date | Time | Opponent | Site | Result | Attendance | Source |
|---|---|---|---|---|---|---|
| October 19 | 2:30 p.m. | at La Verne* | Bonita Union High School; La Verne, CA | W 40–0 | | |
| October 25 | | Occidental | Rose Bowl; Pasadena, CA | W 19–6 | 5,500 | |
| November 2 | | Whittier | Whittier, CA | L 7–19 | 5,000 | |
| November 8 | | Redlands | Rose Bowl; Pasadena, CA | L 6–21 | 5,000 | |
| November 16 | | Pomona | Claremont, CA | L 14–32 | | |
| November 27 | | at Pepperdine* | Sentinel Field; Inglewood, CA | L 0–32 | | |
*Non-conference game; All times are in Pacific time
