= James L. Dutcher =

American football coach

Biographical details
- Born: May 10, 1918; Hebron, Nebraska, U.S.
- Died: December 14, 1992 (aged 74); Billings, Montana, U.S.

Coaching career (HC unless noted)

Football
- 1942–1951: Doane
- 1953–1958: Cornell (IA)

Basketball
- 1944–1947: Doane

Head coaching record
- Overall: 69–52–9 (football); 28–50 (basketball)
- Bowls: 1–0

Accomplishments and honors

Championships
- Football; 4 NCAC (1942, 1946, 1950–1951)

James Laverne Dutcher (May 10, 1918 – December 14, 1992) was an American college football coach. He served as the 23rd head football coach at Doane College in Crete, Nebraska and he held that position for ten seasons, from 1942 until 1951. His coaching record at Doane was 52–28–5. Dutcher led his team to a victory in the 1950 Bean Bowl by a score of 14 to 6 on November 23, 1950.

Dutcher later served as the head coach for Cornell College in Mount Vernon, Iowa from 1953 to 1958, where he compiled a record of 17–27–4.

== Head coaching record ==
=== Football ===
Year	Team	Overall	Conference	Standing	Bowl/playoffs
Doane Tigers (Nebraska College Athletic Conference) (1942–1951)
1942	Doane	5–3	4–0	1st	
1943	Doane	6–1–1	NA	NA	
1944	Doane	2–4	NA	NA	
1945	Doane	3–4–1	NA	NA	
1946	Doane	6–2–1	5–0–1	1st	
1947	Doane	6–2–1	4–2–1	4th	
1948	Doane	5–4	4–2	4th	
1949	Doane	5–4	5–2	3rd	
1950	Doane	7–2–1	4–1–1	1st	W Bean
1951	Doane	7–2	6–1	T–1st	
Doane:		52–28–5	32–8–3		
Cornell Rams (Midwest Conference) (1953–1958)
1953	Cornell	1–7	0–7	9th	
1954	Cornell	2–5–1	2–5–1	7th	
1955	Cornell	5–3	4–3	4th	
1956	Cornell	3–5	3–5	7th	
1957	Cornell	3–3–2	3–3–2	T–4th	
1958	Cornell	3–4–1	3–4–1	5th	
Cornell:		17–27–4	15–27–4		
Total:		69–52–9			
National championship Conference title Conference division title or championship game berth
