= Charles Foster =

Charles or Charlie Foster may refer to:

== Politics and law ==
- Charles Foster (Iowa politician) (1819–1864), American politician, lawyer, schoolteacher and soldier
- Charles Foster (New York politician) (1823–1877), American politician and lawyer
- Charles Foster (Ohio politician) (1828–1904), American politician, governor of Ohio and U.S. Secretary of Treasury
- Charles Foster (attorney), American immigration attorney

== Religion ==
- Charles A. Foster (Latter Day Saints) (fl. 1844), American member of the Latter-Day Saint movement
- Charles H. Foster (1838–1888), American spiritualist medium
- C. W. Foster (Charles Wilmer Foster, 1866–1935), English clergyman, antiquarian, historian and archivist

== Sports ==
- Red Foster (baseball) (Charles B. Foster, fl. 1907–1911), American baseball player
- Charles Foster (race walker) (1893–1943), American racewalker
- Charlie H. Foster (1905–1983), American football, basketball, and track and field coach
- Charles Foster (hurdler) (1953–2019), American hurdler

== Others ==
- Charlie B. Foster (born 1998), American actor
- Charles Foster (writer) (1923–2017), British-born Canadian publicist and writer
- Charles A. Foster (born 1962), British writer, traveller and barrister
- Charles Warren Foster (1830–1904), American soldier

== See also ==
- Charles Foster Kane, fictional character from Orson Welles' film Citizen Kane
- Charles Foster Ofdensen, fictional character from television series Metalocalypse
- Charles Forster (disambiguation)
- Foster (surname)
