= Don Hall =

Don Hall may refer to:

- Don Hall (American football) (c. 1925 – c. 2004), American junior college football coach and college athletics administrator
- Don Hall (ice hockey) (1930–2017), Canadian ice hockey player
- Don Hall (footballer) (1937–2018), Australian footballer
- Don Hall (filmmaker) (born 1969), American filmmaker
- Don Hall (sound editor) (1928–2025), American sound editor
- Don C. Hall (1867–1953), American actor and politician
- Donald James Hall (1935–2020), American ecologist
- Don Hall (comics), fictional superhero from DC Comics
- Don Hall (politician), American politician

== See also ==
- Donald Hall (disambiguation)
