= 1946 Pepperdine Waves football team =

American college football season

1946 Pepperdine Waves football

Will Rogers Bowl, W 38–13 vs. Nebraska Wesleyan
- Conference: Independent
- Record: 8–1
- Head coach: Warren Gaer (1st season)
- Home stadium: Sentinel Field

1946 Western non-major college football independents records
	Conf.			Overall
Team	W	L	T	W		L		T
Southern Oregon		–		8	–	0	–	0
Pepperdine		–		8	–	1	–	0
Hawaii		–		8	–	2	–	0
Cal Poly		–		6	–	2	–	1
Loyola (CA)		–		5	–	4	–	0
Idaho Southern Branch		–		4	–	3	–	1
San Francisco State		–		3	–	3	–	0
Boise State		–		3	–	4	–	2
Eastern Oregon		–		2	–	5	–	0
La Verne		–		0	–	5	–	0

The 1946 Pepperdine Waves football team was a college football team that represented George Pepperdine College (later renamed Pepperdine University) as an independent during the 1946 college football season. In its first year of competition in college football, Pepperdine was led by head coach Warren Gaer, compiling an 8–1 record, including a victory over Nebraska Wesleyan in the 1947 Will Rogers Bowl.

== Schedule ==
Date	Opponent	Site	Result	Attendance	Source
September 28	at Whittier	Hadley Field; Whittier, CA	W 13–0		
October 5	at Arizona State	Goodwin Stadium; Tempe, AZ	L 13–12		
October 12	at Redlands	National Orange Show Stadium; San Bernardino, CA	W 20–7	5,000	
October 18	at Loyola (CA)	Gilmore Stadium; Los Angeles, CA	W 21–6	7,000	
October 26	at Pomona (Note: What is now known as the Pomona-Pitzer football team played using just the Pomona College name from 1893 to 1949. Pitzer College did not exist until 1963.)	Claremont Alumni Field; Claremont, CA	W 19–6		
November 9	Cal Poly	Sentinel Field; Inglewood, CA	W 28–18	7,000	
November 16	at Humboldt State	Redwood Bowl; Arcata, CA	W 19–6		
November 27	Caltech^{†}	Sentinel Field; Inglewood, CA	W 32–0		
January 1	vs. Nebraska Wesleyan	Taft Stadium; Oklahoma City, OK (Will Rogers Bowl)	W 38–13	800	
^{†}Homecoming
