= 1946 Southern Oregon Red Raiders football team =

American college football season

1946 Southern Oregon Red Raiders football

Pear Bowl champion

Pear Bowl, W 13–8 vs. Central Washington
- Conference: Independent
- Record: 8–0
- Head coach: Al Simpson (1st season)
- Home stadium: Walter Phillips Field

1946 Western non-major college football independents records
	Conf.			Overall
Team	W	L	T	W		L		T
Southern Oregon		–		8	–	0	–	0
Pepperdine		–		8	–	1	–	0
Hawaii		–		8	–	2	–	0
Cal Poly		–		6	–	2	–	1
Loyola (CA)		–		5	–	4	–	0
Idaho Southern Branch		–		4	–	3	–	1
San Francisco State		–		3	–	3	–	0
Boise State		–		3	–	4	–	2
Eastern Oregon		–		2	–	5	–	0
La Verne		–		0	–	5	–	0

The 1946 Southern Oregon Red Raiders football team was an American football team that represented Southern Oregon College of Education (now known as Southern Oregon University) as an independent during the 1946 college football season. In their first season under head coach Al Simpson, the Red Raiders compiled a perfect 8–0 record, defeated Central Washington in the Pear Bowl, held opponents to an average of 5.2 points per game, and outscored opponents by a total of 176 to 42. The team split its home game between Ashland and Medford, Oregon.

== Schedule ==
Date	Opponent	Site	Result	Attendance	Source
October 5	at Chico State	Chico, CA	W 20–0	1,000	
October 12	at Humboldt State	Arcata, CA	W 14–7		
October 19	Oregon College	Walter Phillips Field; Ashland, OR	W 53–0		
October 24	Oregon "B" team	Medford, OR	W 12–7		
October 26	Oregon State junior varsity^{†}	Walter Phillips Field; Ashland, OR	W 9–7	2,000	
November 11	San Francisco State	Medford, OR	W 26–6		
November 16	vs. Portland junior varsity	Grants Pass, OR	W 31–7		
November 28	Central Washington	Ashland, OR (Pear Bowl)	W 13–0	4,500	
^{†}Homecoming
