= 1946 Idaho Southern Branch Bengals football team =

American college football season

1946 Idaho Southern Branch Bengals football
- Conference: Independent
- Record: 4–3–1
- Head coach: John Vesser (4th season)
- Captain: Leno Seppi (Note: Seppi graduated in 1950; he became a dentist, served as mayor of Lava Hot Springs, Idaho, and served as president of the Idaho Board of Education. He died in 1995.)
- Home stadium: Spud Bowl

1946 Western non-major college football independents records
	Conf.			Overall
Team	W	L	T	W		L		T
Southern Oregon		–		8	–	0	–	0
Pepperdine		–		8	–	1	–	0
Hawaii		–		8	–	2	–	0
Cal Poly		–		6	–	2	–	1
Loyola (CA)		–		5	–	4	–	0
Idaho Southern Branch		–		4	–	3	–	1
San Francisco State		–		3	–	3	–	0
Boise State		–		3	–	4	–	2
Eastern Oregon		–		2	–	5	–	0
La Verne		–		0	–	5	–	0

The 1946 Idaho Southern Branch Bengals football team was an American football team that represented the University of Idaho, Southern Branch (later renamed Idaho State University) as an independent during the 1946 college football season. In their fourth season under head coach John Vesser, the team compiled a 4–3–1 record and were outscored by their opponents, 146 to 75.

End Harry Dickson was selected to the second team of the 1946 Little All-America college football team. The Bengals had most recently fielded a team in 1944, as no team was fielded during 1945 due to World War II. This was the first season that the team's stadium was formally named the Spud Bowl.

== Schedule ==
Date	Opponent	Site	Result	Attendance	Source
September 28	at Utah State	Aggie Stadium; Logan, UT	L 0–47		
October 5	Carlsbad Junior College	Spud Bowl; Pocatello, ID	W 19–18		
October 11	at Compton	Ramsaur Field; Compton, CA	L 0–37 (Note: Contemporary newspapers reported a 38–0 score.)	10,000 (Note: Another report stated an attendance of 8,500.)	
October 19	Boise	Spud Bowl; Pocatello, ID	W 6–0		
October 26	Weber^{†}	Spud Bowl; Pocatello, ID	L 12–20		
November 2	vs. Albion Normal (Note: Albion Normal is listed in some sources as Southern Idaho, a name adopted in 1947.)	Lincoln Field; Twin Falls, ID	W 6–0	1,000	
November 9	College of Idaho	Spud Bowl; Pocatello, ID	W 26–18		
November 16	Western State (CO)	Spud Bowl; Pocatello, ID	T 6–6		
^{†}Homecoming
