= Clem Parberry =

American coach and administrator (1911–1976)

Biographical details
- Born: December 30, 1911; Colorado Springs, Colorado, U.S.
- Died: July 11, 1976 (aged 64); McCall, Idaho, U.S.

Playing career

Football
- c. 1930: Pacific (OR)

Coaching career (HC unless noted)

Football
- 1938–1951: College of Idaho
- 1953–1956: Idaho (freshman)

Basketball
- 1938–1951: College of Idaho

Baseball
- 1939–1952: College of Idaho
- 1954–1957: Idaho

Administrative career (AD unless noted)
- 1938–1951: College of Idaho

Head coaching record
- Overall: 47–34–5 (football); 124–138 (basketball)

Accomplishments and honors

Championships
- Football; 2 NWC (1948–1949)

Clem Parberry
- Military career
- Allegiance: United States
- Branch: United States Navy
- Service years: 1942–46, 1951–53
- Rank: Lieutenant commander
- Conflicts: World War II, Korean War

Clement Hughes Parberry (December 30, 1911 – July 11, 1976) was an American coach and athletic administrator in Idaho at the College of Idaho in Caldwell and the University of Idaho in Moscow.

Born in Colorado Springs, Colorado, Parberry graduated from Pacific University in Forest Grove, Oregon. After coaching in Gooding, Idaho, he became the athletic director at the College of Idaho in 1938 and its head coach in football, basketball, and baseball.

Parberry served in the U.S. Navy during World War II and the Korean War, rising to lieutenant commander. After his second tour ended in 1953, he joined the athletic staff at the University of Idaho as head baseball coach and assistant in football and basketball. Previously, the head basketball coach at UI also led the baseball program, but increasing overlap between the seasons led to his hiring, taking over from Charles Finley.

Parberry led the Vandal baseball program for four seasons, then transferred to the physical education department, where Wayne Anderson succeeded him as head coach. Parberry ran the intramural program and retired from the university in 1975. He and his wife Viola relocated to McCall, where they had owned and operated summer cabins on Payette Lake for decades. The following summer, Parberry died there of a heart attack at age 64, and is buried at the city cemetery.

A scholarship in physical education at the University of Idaho is awarded in his honor.

== Head coaching record ==
=== Football ===
Year	Team	Overall	Conference	Standing	Bowl/playoffs
College of Idaho Coyotes (Northwest Conference) (1938–1950)
1938	College of Idaho	2–6–1	2–2–1	3rd	
1939	College of Idaho	4–4–1	0–3–1	6th	
1940	College of Idaho	4–2–2	2–0–2	2nd	
1941	College of Idaho	5–5	1–3	5th	
1942	College of Idaho	0–3–1	0–1–1	6th	
1943	No team				
1944	No team				
1945	No team				
1946	College of Idaho	6–4	4–2	2nd	
1947	College of Idaho	7–2	4–2	3rd	
1948	College of Idaho	9–1	5–1	1st	
1949	College of Idaho	6–2	4–1	T–1st	
1950	College of Idaho	4–5	2–3	4th	
College of Idaho:		47–34–5	24–18–5		
Total:		47–34–5			
National championship Conference title Conference division title or championship game berth
