= Don Hall (American football) =

American football coach

Biographical details
- Born: c. 1925; Kincaid, Illinois, U.S.
- Died: c. 2004 (aged 79)

Playing career

Football
- 1942: Pacific (CA)
- 1946–1947: Pacific (CA)
- Position: Center

Coaching career (HC unless noted)

Football
- 1950–1953: Stockton (chief assistant)
- 1954–1958: Stockton
- 1959–1963: Cerritos

Baseball
- c. 1955: Stockton

Golf
- c. 1955: Stockton

Administrative career (AD unless noted)
- 1963–1978: Cerritos

Head coaching record
- Overall: 67–22–5 (football); 94–48 (baseball)
- Bowls: 3–1

Accomplishments and honors

Championships
- Football; 4 Big Seven/Eight (CA) (1955–1958); 2 WSC (1959–1960) Baseball; 1 Big Seven (CA) (1954)

Don Hall (c. 1925 – c. 2004) was an American junior college football coach and college athletics administrator. served as the head football coach at Stockton College—now known as San Joaquin Delta College—from 1954 to 1958 and Cerritos College in Norwalk, California from 1959 to 1963. Hall was also the athletic director at Cerritos from 1963 to 1978.

Hall was born in Kincaid, Illinois and grew up in Richmond, California. He attended the College of the Pacific—now known as the University of the Pacific in Stockton, California, where he played football as a center in 1942, 1946, and 1947. He was captain of the 1946 Pacific Tigers football team, the final team coached by Amos Alonzo Stagg at Pacific. During World War II, Hall served as an officer and a bomber pilot in the United States Army Air Forces. He went to Stockton College in 1950 and worked as Earl Klapstein's chief assistant before succeeding him as head football coach n 1954. Hall also coached baseball and golf at Stockton College. His baseball teams had a record of 94–48 and shared the Big Seven Conference title in 1954.

Hall was inducted into the Pacific Athletic Hall of Fame in 1999. He died around 2004 at the age of 79. Hall's grandson, Korey Hall, played in the National Football League (NFL).

== Head coaching record ==
=== Football ===
Year	Team	Overall	Conference	Standing	Bowl/playoffs
Stockton Mustangs (Big Seven/Eight Conference) (1954–1958)
1954	Stockton	1–4–3	1–3–2	5th	
1955	Stockton	7–2–1	6–0–1	1st	
1956	Stockton	9–1	7–0	1st	W Potato Bowl
1957	Stockton	8–2	5–2	T–1st	W Olive Bowl
1958	Stockton	8–2	5–2	T–1st	W Orange Show Bowl
Stockton:		33–11–4	24–7–3		
Cerritos Falcons (Western State Conference) (1959–1961)
1959	Cerritos	8–1	5–1	T–1st	
1960	Cerritos	8–2	7–0	1st	L Potato Bowl
1961	Cerritos	5–3–1	5–1–1	2nd	
Cerritos Falcons (Metropolitan Conference) (1962–1963)
1962	Cerritos	6–3	4–3	T–4th	
1963	Cerritos	7–2	5–2	3rd	
Cerritos:		34–11–1	26–7–1		
Total:		67–22–5			
National championship Conference title Conference division title or championship game berth
