= Donald Hall (disambiguation) =

Donald Hall (1928-2018) was an American poet, writer, editor, and literary critic.

Donald Hall may also refer to:

- Donald Hall (actor) (1867–1948), British-American film actor
- Donald Hall (RAF officer) (1930–1999), British Royal Air Force officer
- Donald A. Hall (1898–1968), aeronautical engineer and aircraft designer
- Donald J. Hall Jr. (born 1956), president and chief executive officer of Hallmark Cards
- Donald J. Hall Sr. (1928-2024), chairman and majority shareholder of the American company Hallmark Cards
- Donald Hall, part of the superhero team Hawk and Dove from DC Comics

== See also ==
- Don Hall
