= 1946 Far Western Conference football season =

American college football season

Far Western Conference
- Sport: Football
- Teams: 3
- Champion: Humboldt State

Football seasons
- 1945 1947

1946 Far Western Conference football standings
	Conf.					Overall
Team	W		L		T	W		L		T
Humboldt State	1	–	0	–	1	5	–	3	–	1
Chico State	1	–	1	–	0	2	–	7	–	0
Cal Aggies	0	–	1	–	1	0	–	5	–	2
No conference champion was named in 1946.

The 1946 Far Western Conference football season was the season of college football played by the three member schools of the Far Western Conference (FWC) as part of the 1946 college football season.

The Humboldt State Lumberjacks won the FWC championship with a 5–3–1 record (1–0–1 against conference opponents) and outscored opponents by a total of 84 to 70.

== Conference overview ==
Conf. rank	Team	Head coach	Conf. record	Overall record	Points scored	Points against
1	Humboldt State	Joseph Forbes	1–0–1	5–3–1	84	70
2	Chico State	Roy Bohler	1–1	2–7	61	109
3	Cal Aggies	Boyd Bettencourt	0–1–1	0–5–2	54	113

== Teams ==
=== Humboldt State ===
1946 Humboldt State Lumberjacks football
- Conference: Far Western Conference
- Record: 5–3–1 (1–0–1 FWC)
- Head coach: Joseph Forbes (1st season)
- Home stadium: Albee Stadium, Redwood Bowl

The 1946 Humboldt State Lumberjacks football team represented Humboldt State College—now known as California State Polytechnic University, Humboldt. Led by first-year head coach Joseph Forbes, the Lumberjacks compiled an overall record of 5–3–1 with a mark of 1–0–1 in conference play outscored their opponents 84 to 70 for the season. The team played home games at Albee Stadium in Eureka, California and the Redwood Bowl in Arcata, California.

==== Schedule ====
Date	Opponent	Site	Result	Attendance	Source
September 27	Linfield*	Albee Stadium; Eureka, CA	W 14–0		
October 5	Stanford JV*	Redwood Bowl; Arcata, CA	L 0–21 (Note: This was the first game played at the Redwood Bowl.)		
October 10	at Southern Oregon*	Walter E. Phillips Field ?; Ashland, OR	L 7–14		
October 18	at Chico State	Chico High School Stadium; Chico, CA	W 6–2		
October 26	at San Francisco State*	Cox Stadium; San Francisco, CA	W 14–7		
November 2	at Cal Aggies	A Street Field; Davis, CA	T 7–7	2,000	
November 11	Lewis & Clark*	Redwood Bowl; Arcata, CA	W 9–0		
November 16	Pepperdine*	Redwood Bowl; Arcata, CA	L 14–19		
November 23	Oregon College*	Redwood Bowl; Arcata, CA	W 13–0		
*Non-conference game

=== Chico State ===
1946 Chico State Wildcats football
- Conference: Far Western Conference
- Record: 2–7 (1–1 FWC)
- Head coach: Roy Bohler (5th season)
- Home stadium: Chico High School Stadium

1946 Far Western Conference football standings
	Conf.					Overall
Team	W		L		T	W		L		T
Humboldt State	1	–	0	–	1	5	–	3	–	1
Chico State	1	–	1	–	0	2	–	7	–	0
Cal Aggies	0	–	1	–	1	0	–	5	–	2
No conference champion was named in 1946.

The 1946 Chico State Wildcats football team represented Chico State College (now known as California State University, Chico) of Chico, California. Led by fifth-year head coach Roy Bohler, Chico State compiled an overall record of 2–7 with a mark of 1–1 in conference play, placing second in the FWC. The team was outscored by its opponents 109 to 61 for the season. The Wildcats played home games at Chico High School Stadium in Chico.

This was the first team Chico State fielded in four years. They had no team during the war years of 1943 to 1945.

Date	Opponent	Site	Result	Attendance	Source
September 26	at California JV (Note: The University of California JV team was commonly known as the "Cal Ramblers".)*	California Memorial Stadium; Berkeley, CA	L 0–6		
October 3	Southern Oregon*	Chico, CA	L 0–20	1,000	
October 12?	Hamilton Field (Note: Hamilton Army Airfield was a United States Air Force Base from 1934 to 1974.)*	?	W 33–6		
October 19	Humboldt State	Chico High School Stadium; Chico, CA	L 2–6		
October 26	at Cal Aggies	A Street field; Davis, CA	W 13–0		
November 2	at San Francisco State*	Cox Stadium; San Francisco, CA	L 0–26		
November 9	Saint Mary's JV*	Chico High School Stadium; Chico, CA	L 6–19		
November 15	Sacramento*	Chico High School Stadium; Chico, CA	L 0–6		
November 23	at Cal Poly*	Mustang Stadium; San Luis Obispo, CA	L 7–20		
*Non-conference game

=== Cal Aggies ===
1946 Cal Aggies football
- Conference: Far Western Conference
- Record: 0–5–2 (0–1–1 FWC)
- Head coach: Vern Hickey (7th season)
- Captain: Boyd Bettencourt
- Home stadium: A Street field

The 1946 Cal Aggies football team represented the University of California College of Agriculture at Davis, California (now known as the University of California, Davis). Led by seventh-year head coach Vern Hickey, the Aggies compiled an overall record of 0–5–2 with a mark of 0–1–1 in conference play, placing third in the FWC. The team was outscored by its opponents 113 to 54 for the season. The Cal Aggies played home games at A Street field on campus in Davis, California.

The Aggies did not play in the 1943 to 1945 seasons due to World War II.

==== Schedule ====
Date	Opponent	Site	Result	Attendance	Source
October 12	San Francisco State	A Street field; Davis, CA	L 6–13		
October 19	at California JV (Note: The University of California JV team was commonly known as the "Cal Ramblers".)*	California Memorial Stadium; Berkeley, CA	L 14–21		
October 26	Chico State	A Street field; Davis, CA	L 0–13		
November 2	Humboldt State	A Street field; Davis, CA	T 7–7	2,000	
November 9	Stanford JV*	A Street field; Davis, CA	T 14–14		
November 16	at Santa Barbara*	La Playa Stadium; Santa Barbara, CA	L 7–14		
November 23	at Pacific (CA)*	Baxter Stadium; Stockton, CA	L 6–31	3,000	
*Non-conference game
