= Will Rogers Bowl =

- Bowl game
Pepperdine Waves	Nebraska Wesleyan Plainsmen
(7–1)	(7–0—3)
38	13
Head coach: Warren Gaer	Head coach: George "Bus" Knight
	1	2	3	4	Total
Pepperdine	0	0	13	25	38
Nebraska Wesleyan	0	7	0	6	13
- Date: January 1, 1947
- Season: 1946
- Stadium: Taft Stadium
- Location: Oklahoma City, Oklahoma
- Attendance: 800

The Will Rogers Bowl was a postseason college football bowl game held in Oklahoma City, Oklahoma on January 1, 1947. It was intended to be an annual event, but was discontinued after the first edition. The game featured Pepperdine, a first-year football program, and Nebraska Wesleyan.

Pepperdine, a school based in Los Angeles, California, was then known as George Pepperdine College (GPC), and the football team finished its first-ever season of play with an 8–1 record. After 1950, the Pepperdine football program struggled, and was eventually discontinued in 1961. In the last two years of the team's existence, it compiled a 1–17 record.

Nebraska-Wesleyan's football program started in 1896. The program was discontinued in 1897 but resumed in 1908. The football program had never been to a bowl game as well and went 7-0-3 and was coached by George "Bus" Knight in his first year as a college coach. The mascot names for Nebraska-Wesleyan have changed from Coyotes to Sun Flowers to Plainsmen to Prairie Wolves and the program has won 22 conference titles. The football program continues to this day.

The game was played on January 1, 1947 in Oklahoma City, Oklahoma. It was named in honor of Will Rogers, a famous Oklahoma native and self-proclaimed "Cowboy Philosopher," who had died in a plane crash the previous decade. A snow storm hit Oklahoma City just before the game and the game was only attended by 800 people. Nebraska-Wesleyan led 7–0 at halftime but Pepperdine came back to win the game 38–13.

The bowl game remains Nebraska-Wesleyan and Pepperdine's only college bowl appearance.
