= 1946 Loyola Lions football team =

American college football season

1946 Loyola Lions football
- Conference: Independent
- Record: 5–4
- Head coach: Tony DeLellis (1st season)
- Home stadium: Gilmore Stadium

1946 Western non-major college football independents records
	Conf.			Overall
Team	W	L	T	W		L		T
Southern Oregon		–		8	–	0	–	0
Pepperdine		–		8	–	1	–	0
Hawaii		–		8	–	2	–	0
Cal Poly		–		6	–	2	–	1
Loyola (CA)		–		5	–	4	–	0
Idaho Southern Branch		–		4	–	3	–	1
San Francisco State		–		3	–	3	–	0
Boise State		–		3	–	4	–	2
Eastern Oregon		–		2	–	5	–	0
La Verne		–		0	–	5	–	0

The 1946 Loyola Lions football team was an American football team that represented Loyola University of Los Angeles (now known as Loyola Marymount University) as an independent during the 1946 college football season. In their first and only season under head coach Tony DeLellis, the Lions compiled a 5–4 record.

== Schedule ==
Date	Opponent	Site	Result	Attendance	Source
October 4	Santa Barbara	Gilmore Stadium; Los Angeles, CA	W 6–0		
October 11	Pomona	Gilmore Stadium; Los Angeles, CA	W 13–0	6,000	
October 18	Pepperdine	Gilmore Stadium; Los Angeles, CA	L 6–21	7,000	
October 25	Redlands	Gilmore Stadium; Los Angeles, CA	W 14–9	6,000	
November 2	at Fresno State	Ratcliffe Stadium; Fresno, CA	L 0–28	6,540	
November 8	San Diego State	Gilmore Stadium; Los Angeles, CA	L 7–20	5,500–6,000	
November 15	Occidental	Gilmore Stadium; Los Angeles, CA	W 14–12	4,000	
November 22	vs. Nevada	Butcher Memorial Field; Las Vegas, NV	L 0–53	4,000	
November 29	Whittier	Gilmore Stadium; Los Angeles, CA	W 13–6	3,500	
