= 1946 Nebraska College Conference football season =

American college football season

- Sport: Football
- Teams: 9
- Champion: Doane

Football seasons
- 1945 1947

1946 Nebraska College Conference football standings
	Conf.					Overall
Team	W		L		T	W		L		T
Doane $	5	–	0	–	1	6	–	2	–	1
Nebraska Wesleyan	5	–	0	–	2	7	–	1	–	3
Kearney State	5	–	2	–	1	6	–	2	–	1
Peru State	4	–	3	–	1	4	–	4	–	1
Midland	3	–	4	–	0	4	–	4	–	0
Wayne State (NE)	2	–	3	–	0	4	–	3	–	0
Hastings	1	–	4	–	1	1	–	6	–	1
Chadron State	1	–	5	–	0	3	–	7	–	0
York (NE)	0	–	6	–	0	3	–	6	–	0
$ – Conference champion

The 1946 Nebraska College Conference football season was the season of college football played by the nine member schools of the Nebraska College Conference (NCC) as part of the 1946 college football season. The Doane Tigers from Crete, Nebraska were led by head coach James L. Dutcher and compiled an overall record of 6–2–1 with a mark of 5–0–1 in conference play, winning the NCC championship. The Nebraska Wesleyan Plainsmen were led by head coach George W. Knight. They finished second in the conference with a 5–0–2 record in conference play and a mark of 7–0–3 overall in the regular season. They then lost to Pepperdine in the Will Rogers Bowl.

None of the NCC teams was ranked in the Associated Press poll.

== Conference overview ==
Conf. rank	Team	Head coach	Conf. record	Overall record	Points scored	Points against
1	Doane	James L. Dutcher	5–0–1	6–2–1	253	51
2	Nebraska Wesleyan	George W. Knight	4–0–2	7–1–3	169	37
3	Kearney State	Charlie Foster	5–2–1	6–2–1	116	49
4	Peru State	Alfred G. Wheeler	4–3–1	4–4–1	116	100
5	Midland	John Pfitsch	4–3	4–4	89	73
6	Wayne State (NE)	Don B. Emery	2–3	4–3	69	33
7	Hastings	Larry Owens	1–4–1	1–6–1	45	123
8	Chadron State	Ross O. Armstrong	1–5	3–7	70	230
9	York (NE)	Rolland E. Tonkin	0–6	3–6	92	138

== Teams ==
=== Doane ===
1946 Doane Tigers football

NCC champion
- Conference: Nebraska College Conference
- Record: 6–2–1 (5–0–1 NCC)
- Head coach: James L. Dutcher (5th season)

The 1946 Doane Tigers football team was an American football team that represented Doane University as a member of the Nebraska College Conference (NCC) during the 1946 college football season. In their fifth year under head coach James L. Dutcher, the team compiled a 6–2–1 record (5–0–1 against NCC opponents), won the NCC championship, and outscored opponents by a total of 136 to 78.

Date	Opponent	Site	Result	Attendance	Source
September 20	at Simpson*	Indianola, IA	L 0–14		
September 28	Peru State		W 12–0		
October 4	York (NE)	Crete, NE	W 12–6		
October 12	Hastings	Crete, NE	T 19–19		
October 18	at Wayne State (NE)	Wayne, NE	W 7–6		
October 25	Kearney State	Kearney, NE	W 13–7		
November 1	Dakota Wesleyan*^{†}	Crete, NE	L 7–19		
November 15	Chadron State	Crete, NE	W 21–0		
November 28	at Roswell Army Air Force*	Roswell, NM	W 45–7		
*Non-conference game; ^{†}Homecoming

=== Nebraska Wesleyan ===
1946 Nebraska Wesleyan Plainsmen football

Will Rogers Bowl, L 13–38 vs. Pepperdine
- Conference: Nebraska College Conference
- Record: 7–1–3 (4–0–2 NCC)
- Head coach: George W. Knight
- Home stadium: O. N. Magee Memorial Stadium

The 1946 Nebraska Wesleyan Plainsmen football team represented Nebraska Wesleyan University as a member of the Nebraska College Conference (NCC) during the 1946 college football season. Led by head coach George W. Knight, the Plainsmen compiled a 7–1–3 (4-0-2 against NCC opponents), outscored opponent by a total of 169 to 37, and finished second in the NCC. They were invited to play in the Will Rogers Bowl in Oklahoma City on New Year's Day, losing to Pepperdine by a 38–13 score.

Date	Opponent	Site	Result	Attendance	Source
September 21	Morningside*	Sioux City, IA	W 13–6	3,500	
September 28	Simpson*	O. N. Magee Memorial Stadium; Lincoln, NE	T 6–6	4,000	
October 4	at Nebraska Central	Central City, NE	W 33–0		
October 12	at Kearney State	Kearney, NE	T 6–6		
October 18	Midland^{†}	O. N. Magee Memorial Stadium; Lincoln, NE	W 7–6		
October 25	Tarkio*	O. N. Magee Memorial Stadium; Lincoln, NE	W 20–7		
November 1	at Peru State	Peru, NE	T 6–6		
November 8	at York	York, NE	W 26–0		
November 15	Hastings	O. N. Magee Memorial Stadium; Lincoln, NE	W 19–0		
November 22	Chadron State	O. N. Magee Memorial Stadium; Lincoln, NE	W 33–0		
January 1, 1947	vs. Pepperdine*	Taft Stadium; Oklahoma City, OK	L 13–38	800	
*Non-conference game; ^{†}Homecoming

=== Kearney State ===
1946 Kearney State Antelopes football
- Conference: Nebraska College Conference
- Record: 6–2–1 (5–2–1 NCC)
- Head coach: Charlie Foster (2nd season)

The 1946 Kearney State Antelopes football team represented Nebraska State Teachers College at Kearney (now known as University of Nebraska at Kearney) as a member of the Nebraska College Conference (NCC) during the 1946 college football season. Led by second-year head coach Charlie Foster, the Antelopes compiled a 6–2–1 record (5-2-1 against NCC opponents), outscored opponent by a total of 116 to 49, and finished third in the NCC.

Date	Opponent	Site	Result	Source
September 20	York	Kearney, NE	W 16–0	
	Hastings		W 7–0	
October 5	Chadron State	Kearney, NE	W 14–0	
October 12	Nebraska Wesleyan	Kearney, NE	T 6–6	
	Sterling		W 32–0	
October 25	Doane	Kearney, NE	L 7–13	
November 2	at Wayne State (NE)	Wayne, NE	W 14–12	
November 9	at Peru State	Peru, NE	W 20–12	
November 15	Midland		L 0–6	

=== Peru State ===
1946 Peru State Bobcats football
- Conference: Nebraska College Conference
- Record: 4–4–1 (4–3–1 NCC)
- Head coach: Alfred G. Wheeler

The 1946 Peru State Bobcats football team represented Peru State Teachers College (now known as Peru State College) as a member of the Nebraska College Conference (NCC) during the 1946 college football season. Led by head coach Alfred G. Wheeler, the Bobcats compiled a 4–4–1 record (4-3-1 against NCC opponents), outscored opponents by a total of 116 to 100, and finished fourth in the NCC.

Other coaches included Wayne Riggs. For the prior three years, Navy V-12 students comprised the majority of Peru's football team. With the 1946, the team returned to non-military status.

Date	Opponent	Site	Result	Source
September 20	at Colorado College*	Washburn Field; Colorado Springs, CO	L 7–40	
September 28	Doane		L 0–12	
	Midland		W 19–6	
	Wayne State (NE)		L 0–7	
	Chadron State		W 26–6	
	Hastings		W 14–0	
November 1	Nebraska Wesleyan	Peru, NE	T 6–6	
November 9	Kearney State	Peru, NE	L 12–20	
	York		W 32–3	
*Non-conference game

=== Midland ===
1946 Midland Warriors football
- Conference: Nebraska College Conference
- Record: 4–4 (4–3 NCC)
- Head coach: John Pfitsch

The 1946 Midland Warriors football team represented Midland University of Fremont, Nebraska, as a member of the Nebraska College Conference (NCC) during the 1946 college football season. Led by head coach John Pfitsch, the Warriors compiled a 4–4 record (4-3 against NCC opponents), outscored opponents by a total of 89 to 73, and finished fifth in the NCC.

Date	Opponent	Site	Result	Source
September 20	Bethany (KS)*	Fremont, NE	L 4–13	
	Wayne State (NE)		L 0–13	
	Peru State		L 6–19	
	York		W 20–14	
October 18	at Nebraska Wesleyan	O. N. Magee Memorial Stadium; Lincoln, NE	L 6–7	
	Chadron State		W 40–6	
	Hastings		W 7–0	
November 15	Kearney State		W 6–0	
*Non-conference game

=== Wayne State ===
1946 Wayne State Wildcats football
- Conference: Nebraska College Conference
- Record: 4–3 (2–3 NCC)
- Head coach: Don B. Emery

The 1946 Wayne State Wildcats football team represented Wayne State College of Wayne, Nebraska, as a member of the Nebraska College Conference (NCC) during the 1946 college football season. Led by head coach Don B. Emery, the Warriors compiled a 4–3 record (2-3 against NCC opponents), outscored opponents by a total of 69 to 33, and finished sixth in the NCC.

Date	Opponent	Site	Result	Source
September 20	at Dakota Wesleyan		W 13–0	
	Midland		W 13–0	
October 5	at South Dakota*	Inman Field; Vermillion, SD	W 12–0	
	Peru State		W 7–0	
October 18	Doane	Wayne, NE	L 6–7	
	Kearney State		L 12–14	
	Chadron State		L 6–12	
*Non-conference game

=== Hastings ===
1946 Hastings Broncos football
- Conference: Nebraska College Conference
- Record: 1–6–1 (1–4–1 NCC)
- Head coach: Larry Owens

The 1946 Hastings Broncos football team represented Hastings College of Hastings, Nebraska, as a member of the Nebraska College Conference (NCC) during the 1946 college football season. Led by head coach Larry Owens, the Broncos compiled a 1–6–1 record (1–4–1 against NCC opponents), were outscored by a total of 123 to 45, and finished seventh in the NCC.

Date	Opponent	Site	Result	Source
September 20	at Washburn (KS)*	Topeka, KS	L 0–25	
	Kearney State		L 0–7	
October 5	at Western State (CO)*	Gunnison, CO	L 7–19	
October 12	at Doane	Crete, NE	T 19–19	
	Peru State		L 0–14	
	York		W 19–13	
	Midland		L 0–7	
November 15	at Nebraska Wesleyan	O. N. Magee Memorial Stadium; Lincoln, NE	L 0–19	
*Non-conference game

=== Chadron State ===
1946 Chadron State Eagles football
- Conference: Nebraska College Conference
- Record: 3–7 (1–5 NCC)
- Head coach: Ross O. Armstrong

The 1946 Chadron State Eagles football team represented Chadron State College of Chadron, Nebraska, as a member of the Nebraska College Conference (NCC) during the 1946 college football season. Led by head coach Ross O. Armstrong, the Eagles compiled a 3–7 record (1–5 against NCC opponents), were outscored by a total of 230 to 70, and finished eighth in the NCC.

Date	Opponent	Site	Result	Source
	South Dakota Tech*		W 19–6	
September 28	Colorado State–Greeley*	Elliott Field; Chadron, NE	L 8–46	
October 5	at Kearney State	Kearney, NE	L 0–14	
	Black Hills State*		W 19–0	
	Peru State		L 6–26	
	Midland		L 6–40	
November 2	at Western State (CO)*	Gunnison, CO	L 0–38	
	Wayne State (NE)		W 12–6	
November 15	at Doane	Crete, NE	L 0–21	
November 22	at Nebraska Wesleyan	O. N. Magee Memorial Stadium; Lincoln, NE	L 0–33	
*Non-conference game

=== York ===
1946 York Panthers football
- Conference: Nebraska College Conference
- Record: 3–6 (0–6 NCC)
- Head coach: Rolland E. Tonkin

The 1946 York Panthers football team represented York University of York, Nebraska, as a member of the Nebraska College Conference (NCC) during the 1946 college football season. Led by head coach Rolland E. Tonkin, the Eagles compiled a 3–6 record (0–6 against NCC opponents), were outscored by a total of 138 to 92, and finished last in the NCC.

== All-conference team ==
The United Press (UP) and the NCC coaches each selected 1946 All-Nebraska College Conference football teams. NCC champion Doane did not place any players on the UP team. The all-conference picks were as follows:

- Quarterback: Rex Mercer, Nebraska Wesleyan (UP)
- Halfbacks: Dick Peterson, Kearney (UP, Coaches); Johnny Warwick, Hastings (Coaches); Revoe Hill, Midland (UP, Coaches)
- Fullback: Al Butterfield, Chadron (UP, Coaches)
- Ends: John Rumbaugh, Kearney (UP, Coaches); Rich Clough, Midland (UP); Orville Yocup, Peru (Coaches)
- Tackles: Bob Westphal, Wayne (UP, Coaches); Everett Poe, Nebraska Wesleyan (UP); Don Redman, Doane (Coaches)
- Guards: Wayne Linder, Peru (UP); Ralph Patterson, Kearney (UP, Coaches); Dick Uphoff, Hastings (Coaches)
- Center: Cliff Squires, Nebraska Wesleyan (UP, Coaches)
