= Bureau of Colored Troops =

American Civil War era military organization

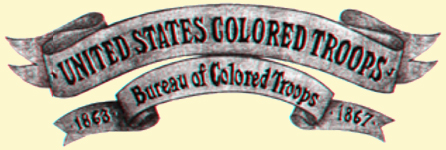
Banner for the Bureau of Colored troops

The Bureau of Colored Troops was created by the United States War Department on May 22, 1863, under General Order No. 143, during the Civil War, to handle "all matters relating to the organization of colored troops". Major Charles Warren Foster was chief of the bureau, which reported to Adjutant General Lorenzo Thomas. The designation United States Colored Troops (USCT) replaced the varied state titles that had been given to the African-American soldiers.

== Origins and recruitment ==
The first official authorization to employ African Americans in federal service was the Second Confiscation and Militia Act of July 17, 1862. This act allowed President Abraham Lincoln to receive into the military service persons of African descent and gave permission to use them for any purpose "he may judge best for the public welfare". However, the president did not authorize use of African Americans in combat until issuance of the Emancipation Proclamation on January 1, 1863: "And I further declare and make known, that such persons of suitable condition, will be received into the armed service of the United States to garrison forts, positions, stations, and other places, and to man vessels of all sorts in said service." With these words the Union army changed.

In mid-1863, the administrative load became so burdensome that the War Department decided to create a single entity under the umbrella of the Adjutant General's Office, called the Bureau of Colored Troops, to manage its affairs. Headed by Major Charles Warren Foster, the bureau was to systematize the process of raising black units and securing officers for them. It also served as a clearinghouse of information on these units. Over the course of the next year, the War Department began to change the names of black commands. Instead of state designations, they became United States Colored Troops (USCT), and the various units became United States Colored Infantry, Artillery, or Cavalry.

== Racial segregation and treatment ==
The Bureau of Colored Troops brought efficiency to the USCT regiments, but not always equitable treatment. Despite objections from black leaders, the Bureau insisted on assigning only white men to commissioned officer positions. Although a small number of black soldiers received commissions by the end of the war—including the Virginia-born Martin R. Delany—and many served as non-commissioned officers, the USCT remained primarily an organization led by whites. Officials in the army and in the government also initially assumed that black regiments would rarely, if ever, be used in combat. As a result, black soldiers endured a disproportionate share of labor duty. Also the assumption that black soldiers were workers, not fighters, led to inequities in pay. It was initially indicated that black soldiers would be paid $13 per month, which was the wage that white soldiers received. But in the Militia Act of 1862, Congress set the pay for black soldiers at $10 per month, $3 of which could be in clothing, which was the rate for military laborers. Black soldiers were also often denied recruitment bounties routinely offered to white soldiers, and were rarely eligible to collect aid for dependents, a benefit that state legislation often made available to white men serving in the ranks.

== Major supporters ==
After the Emancipation Proclamation was announced, black recruitment was pursued in earnest. Volunteers from South Carolina, Tennessee, and Massachusetts filled the first authorized black regiments. However, recruitment was slow until the support of prominent African-American figures such as Frederick Douglass and Martin Delany. Delany was commissioned as a major, the first African-American field officer in the United States Army during the Civil War, and was active in recruiting black men for the United States Colored Troops. Douglass, on the other hand, encouraged black men to become soldiers to ensure eventual full citizenship. Volunteers began to respond, and in May 1863 the government established the Bureau of Colored Troops to manage the burgeoning numbers of black soldiers.
