= Roy Dennis (American football) =

American football player, coach, and administrator (1925–1988)

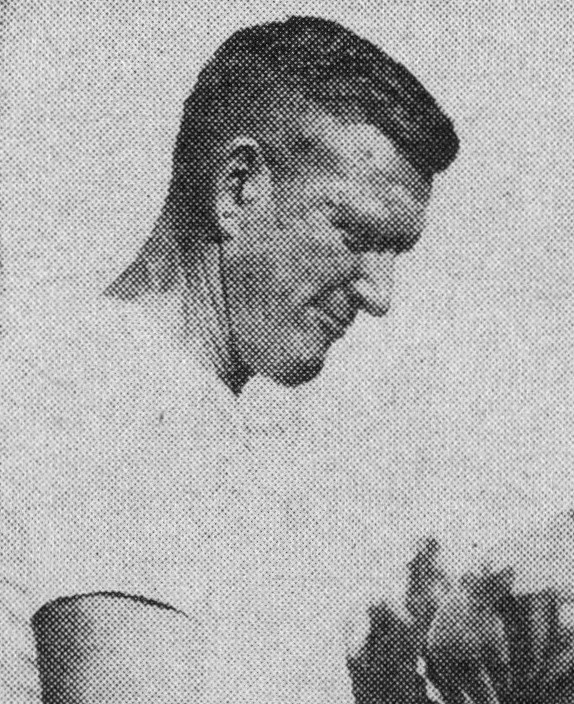
- Dennis, circa 1952

Biographical details
- Born: 1905
- Died: January 7, 1988 (aged 82); Laguna Hills, California, U.S.

Playing career

Football
- 1929–1932: Occidental

Baseball
- c. 1930: Occidental
- Positions: End (football); First baseman (baseball)

Coaching career (HC unless noted)

Football
- 1934: Occidental (assistant)
- 1935–?: Occidental (freshmen)
- 1945–1956: Occidental

Administrative career (AD unless noted)
- 1945–1970: Occidental

Head coaching record
- Overall: 52–39–4 (football)
- Bowls: 1–0

Accomplishments and honors

Championships
- Football; 3 SCC/SCIAC (1948, 1951, 1953)

Roy Dennis (1905 – January 7, 1988) was an American football coach and college athletics administrator. He served as the head football coach at Occidental College from 1945 to 1956, compiling a record of 52–39–4. Dennis also coached basketball, baseball, tennis, swimming, and water polo at Occidental and was the school's athletic director until 1970.

Dennis attended Los Angeles High School in Los Angeles, where he won honors playing football, basketball, and baseball. He then move on to Occidental, where he played football as an end and baseball as a first baseman, winning all-Southern California Conference honors in both sports before graduating in 1933. Dennis joined the coaching staff at his alma mater in the fall of 1934 as assistant football coach under Bill Anderson. The following year he coach the freshman football, basketball, and baseball teams.

== Head coaching record ==
=== Football ===
Year	Team	Overall	Conference	Standing	Bowl/playoffs
Occidental Tigers (Southern California Conference / Southern California Intercollegiate Athletic Conference) (1945–1956)
1945	Occidental	1–4			
1946	Occidental	1–4–2	1–2–1	4th	
1947	Occidental	4–3–1	2–1–1	2nd	
1948	Occidental	9–0	4–0	1st	W Raisin
1949	Occidental	4–4	1–3	4th	
1950	Occidental	4–4	1–3	4th	
1951	Occidental	6–2	4–0	1st	
1952	Occidental	4–4	3–1	2nd	
1953	Occidental	6–2	3–1	T–1st	
1954	Occidental	4–4–1	2–2	3rd	
1955	Occidental	6–2	2–2	3rd	
1956	Occidental	3–6	1–3	4th	
Occidental:		52–39–4			
Total:		52–39–4			
National championship Conference title Conference division title or championship game berth
