= Ross O. Armstrong =

American football and basketball player and coach (1905–1990)

Biographical details
- Born: February 4, 1905; Brooklyn, Iowa, U.S.
- Died: January 3, 1990 (aged 84); Chadron, Nebraska. U.S.

Playing career

Football
- 1925: Iowa

Basketball
- 1924–1927: Iowa

Coaching career (HC unless noted)

Football
- 1938–1952: Chadron State

Basketball
- 1935–1950: Chadron State

Administrative career (AD unless noted)
- 1937–1950: Chadron State

Head coaching record
- Overall: 51–52–4 (football); 157–76 (basketball)

Accomplishments and honors

Championships
- Football; 2 NCC (1947–1948)

Ross Oakley Armstrong Sr. (February 4, 1905 – January 3, 1990) was an American football and basketball player and coach. He served as the head football coach at Chadron State College in Chadron, Nebraska from 1938 to 1952. Armstrong was also the head basketball coach at Chadron State from 1935 to 1950, tallying a mark of 157–76.

As a college athlete, Armstrong played football and basketball at the University of Iowa.

== Head coaching record ==
=== Football ===
Year	Team	Overall	Conference	Standing	Bowl/playoffs
Chadron State Eagles (Nebraska Intercollegiate Athletic Association) (1938–1952)
1938	Chadron State	2–6	0–2	T–3rd	
1939	Chadron State	4–3–1	2–1	2nd	
1940	Chadron State	5–4	1–2	4rd	
1941	Chadron State	3–4	0–3	4th	
1942	Chadron State	4–1–1	1–1	T–2nd	
Chadron State Eagles (Nebraska College Conference) (1943–1952)
1943	No team—World War II				
1944	No team—World War II				
1945	Chadron State	0–4	0–2		
1946	Chadron State	3–7	1–5	8th	
1947	Chadron State	7–1–1	5–1–1	T–1st	
1948	Chadron State	7–1	6–1	T–1st	
1949	Chadron State	7–3	6–2	2nd	
1950	Chadron State	5–4–1	4–2–1	T–4th	
1951	Chadron State	1–8	1–6	7th	
1952	Chadron State	3–6	2–5	7th	
Chadron State:		51–52–4	29–33–2		
Total:		51–52–4			
National championship Conference title Conference division title or championship game berth
