= 1946 Santa Barbara Gauchos football team =

American college football season

1946 Santa Barbara Gauchos football
- Conference: California Collegiate Athletic Association
- Record: 2–6 (0–4 CCAA)
- Head coach: Stan Williamson (2nd season)
- Home stadium: La Playa Stadium

1946 California Collegiate Athletic Association football standings
	Conf.					Overall
Team	W		L		T	W		L		T
San Jose State $	4	–	0	–	0	9	–	1	–	1
Fresno State	2	–	2	–	0	8	–	4	–	0
San Diego State	2	–	2	–	0	6	–	4	–	0
Pacific (CA)	2	–	2	–	0	4	–	7	–	0
Santa Barbara	0	–	4	–	0	2	–	6	–	0
$ – Conference champion

The 1946 Santa Barbara Gauchos football team represented Santa Barbara College—now known as University of California, Santa Barbara (UCSB) as a member of the California Collegiate Athletic Association during the 1946 college football season. Led by second-year head coach Stan Williamson, Santa Barbara compiled an overall record of 2–6. with a mark of 0–4 in conference play, placing last out of five teams in the CCAA. The Gauchos played home games at La Playa Stadium in Santa Barbara, California.

This was the first year of competition for Santa Barbara after a five-year hiatus due to World War II.

== Schedule ==
Date	Opponent	Site	Result	Source
September 28	Cal Poly*	La Playa Stadium; Santa Barbara, CA	W 19–6	
October 4	Loyola (CA)*	La Playa Stadium; Santa Barbara, CA	L 0–6	
October 11	at Pacific (CA)	Baxter Stadium; Stockton, CA	L 0–21	
October 19	Fresno State	La Playa Stadium; Santa Barbara, CA	L 13–20	
November 1	San Jose State	La Playa Stadium; Santa Barbara, CA	L 0–20	
November 9	at Nevada*	Mackay Stadium (Note: This stadium is the predecessor to the current Mackay Stadium, which was opened for the 1966 season.); Reno, NV	L 13–48	
November 15	Cal Aggies*	La Playa Stadium; Santa Barbara, CA	W 14–7	
November 23	San Diego State	La Playa Stadium; Santa Barbara, CA	L 7–9	
*Non-conference game
