= Tony DeLellis =

American football player and coach (1916–2003)

Biographical details
- Born: August 1, 1916
- Died: September 6, 2003 (aged 87)

Playing career
- 1937–1939: Loyola (CA)
- Positions: Halfback, quarterback

Coaching career (HC unless noted)
- 1946: Loyola (CA)

Administrative career (AD unless noted)
- 1946: Loyola (CA)

Head coaching record
- Overall: 5–4

Anthony R. DeLellis (August 1, 1916 – September 6, 2003) was an American college football coach. He served as the head coach at Loyola Marymount University in 1946.

== Biography ==
DeLellis played as a halfback and quarterback at Loyola Marymount. Because of his diminutive stature, he was once described as "the iron mite of 155 pounds". In 1939, Mike Pecarovich took over as head coach from Tom Lieb and demoted DeLellis to the third string early in the season. However, he worked his way back to the top of the roster. In November, The Los Angeles Times wrote, "on the Loyola side, it became increasingly apparent that just about the best football player, pound for pound, in these parts is little Tony DeLellis."

In 1943, DeLellis was hired as football coach at Loyola Marymount, but the football program did not compete during World War II. In 1946, football resumed at Loyola, and DeLellis coached the team to a 5–4 record in his only season there. He also served as the school's athletic director.

His son, also named Anthony R. DeLellis, played at Stanford as a fullback from 1961 to 1963.

== Head coaching record ==
| Year | Team | Overall | Conference | Standing | Bowl/playoffs |
|---|---|---|---|---|---|
Loyola Lions (Independent) (1946)
| 1946 | Loyola | 5–4 | | | |
| Loyola: | | 5–4 | | | |
| Total: | | 5–4 | | | |
