= 1946 Fresno State Bulldogs football team =

American college football season

1946 Fresno State Bulldogs football
- Conference: California Collegiate Athletic Association
- Record: 8–4 (2–2 CCAA)
- Head coach: James Bradshaw (8th season)
- Home stadium: Ratcliffe Stadium

1946 California Collegiate Athletic Association football standings
	Conf.					Overall
Team	W		L		T	W		L		T
San Jose State $	4	–	0	–	0	9	–	1	–	1
Fresno State	2	–	2	–	0	8	–	4	–	0
San Diego State	2	–	2	–	0	6	–	4	–	0
Pacific (CA)	2	–	2	–	0	4	–	7	–	0
Santa Barbara	0	–	4	–	0	2	–	6	–	0
$ – Conference champion

The 1946 Fresno State Bulldogs football team represented Fresno State Normal School—now known as California State University, Fresno—during the 1946 college football season.

Fresno State competed in the California Collegiate Athletic Association (CCAA). The team was led by eighth-year head coach James Bradshaw and played home games at Ratcliffe Stadium on the campus of Fresno City College in Fresno, California. They finished the season with a record of eight wins and four losses (8–4, 2–2 CCAA). The Bulldogs outscored their opponents 177–129 for the season.

== Schedule ==
Date	Opponent	Site	Result	Attendance	Source
September 28	Santa Clara*	Ratcliffe Stadium; Fresno, CA	W 20–7	14,694	
October 5	Honolulu All-Stars (HI)*	Ratcliffe Stadium; Fresno, CA	W 13–6	11,613	
October 12	at Oklahoma City*	Taft Stadium; Oklahoma City, OK	L 7–46		
October 19	at Santa Barbara	La Playa Stadium; Santa Barbara, CA	W 20–13		
October 26	at San Diego State	Balboa Stadium; San Diego, CA (rivalry)	L 0–7	8,000	
November 2	Loyola (CA)*	Ratcliffe Stadium; Fresno, CA	W 28–0	6,540	
November 11	Hawaii*	Ratcliffe Stadium; Fresno, CA (rivalry)	L 2–7	11,057	
November 16	Pacific (CA)	Ratcliffe Stadium; Fresno, CA	W 13–12	6,809	
November 22	at San Jose State	Spartan Stadium; San Jose, CA (rivalry)	L 2–13	7,500	
November 28	Idaho*	Ratcliffe Stadium; Fresno, CA	W 13–12	6,827	
December 5	at Moihli Bears (HI)*	Honolulu Stadium ?; Honolulu, HI	W 41–0		
December 11	at Wahiawa Leilehua HS Alumni (HI)*	Honolulu Stadium ?; Honolulu, HI	W 18–6	12,000	
*Non-conference game

== Team players in the NFL ==
The following Fresno State Bulldog players were selected in the 1947 NFL draft.

Player	Position	Round	Overall	NFL team
Gene Lamoure	Guard	22	197	Boston Yanks

The following Fresno State Bulldog players finished their college career in 1946, were not drafted, but played in the NFL.

Player	Position	First NFL team
Dick Handley	Center – Linebacker	1947 Baltimore Colts
