= Charlie H. Foster =

American football, basketball, and track and field coach

Charlie Foster
Biographical details
- Born: June 20, 1905
- Died: November 17, 1983 (aged 78); Kearney, Nebraska, U.S.

Coaching career (HC unless noted)

Football
- 1945–1952: Kearney State

Basketball
- 1944–1949: Kearney State

Track and field
- 1945–1971: Kearney State

Head coaching record
- Overall: 42–24–3 (football); 39–36 (basketball)

Charlie Hayes Foster (June 20, 1905 – November 17, 1983) was an American football, basketball, and track and field coach. He served as the head football coach at Nebraska State Teachers College—now known as University of Nebraska–Kearney—from 1945 to 1952, compiling a record of 42–24–3. Foster was also the head basketball coach at Kearney State from 1944 to 1949, tallying a mark of 39–36. However, Foster's most pioneering role was a track and field coach. He is widely regarded as the "Father of Nebraska Cross Country". According to the Nebraska Sports Hall of Fame, "He featured girls' track events in meets before the sport was approved by the state and was the first to add the triple jump." The football field at Nebraska–Kearney bears his name.

== Head coaching record ==
=== Football ===
Year	Team	Overall	Conference	Standing	Bowl/playoffs
Kearney State Antelopes (Nebraska College Conference) (1945–1952)
1945	Kearney State	6–1			
1946	Kearney State	6–2–1	5–2–1	3rd	
1947	Kearney State	6–3–1	4–3–1	5th	
1948	Kearney State	5–3	3–3	T–5th	
1949	Kearney State	5–3–1	3–3–1	T–4th	
1950	Kearney State	4–5	3–5	7th	
1951	Kearney State	5–3	4–3	T–4th	
1952	Kearney State	5–4	3–4	T–5th	
Kearney State:		42–24–3	25–23–3		
Total:		42–24–3			
