= 1946 Pacific Tigers football team =

American college football season

1946 Pacific Tigers football

Optimist Bowl, L 13–14 vs. North Texas State Teachers
- Conference: California Collegiate Athletic Association
- Record: 4–7 (2–2 CCAA)
- Head coach: Amos Alonzo Stagg (14th season)
- Captain: Don Hall
- Home stadium: Baxter Stadium

1946 California Collegiate Athletic Association football standings
	Conf.					Overall
Team	W		L		T	W		L		T
San Jose State $	4	–	0	–	0	9	–	1	–	1
Fresno State	2	–	2	–	0	8	–	4	–	0
San Diego State	2	–	2	–	0	6	–	4	–	0
Pacific (CA)	2	–	2	–	0	4	–	7	–	0
Santa Barbara	0	–	4	–	0	2	–	6	–	0
$ – Conference champion

The 1946 Pacific Tigers football team was an American football team that represented the College of the Pacific—now known as the University of the Pacific—in Stockton, California as a member of the California Collegiate Athletic Association (CCAA) during the 1946 college football season. They had previously competed in the Far Western Conference (FWC) from 1925 to 1942 and as an independent from 1943 to 1945. In their 14th and final season under head coach Amos Alonzo Stagg, the Tigers compiled a record of 4–7 with mark of 2–2 in conference play, placing in a three-way tie for second in the CCAA. At the end of the season, the Tigers were invited to the first, and only Optimist Bowl in Houston, where they lost to North Texas State Teachers. The Tigers played home games at Baxter Stadium in Stockton.

== Schedule ==
Date	Opponent	Site	Result	Attendance	Source
September 28	at Oregon*	Hayward Field; Eugene, OR	L 6–7	10,000	
October 4	Williams Field*	Baxter Stadium; Stockton, CA	W 31–0		
October 11	Santa Barbara	Baxter Stadium; Stockton, CA	W 21–0		
October 19	at Arizona*	Varsity Stadium; Tucson, AZ	L 13–47	12,500	
October 26	at No. 8 Northwestern*	Dyche Stadium; Evanston, IL	L 13–26	35,000	
November 1	Hawaii*	Baxter Stadium; Stockton, CA	L 13–19	7,000	
November 8	San Jose State	Baxter Stadium; Stockton, CA (rivalry)	L 0–32		
November 16	at Fresno State	Ratcliffe Stadium; Fresno, CA	L 12–13	6,809	
November 23	Cal Aggies*^{†}	Baxter Stadium; Stockton, CA	W 31–6	3,000	
November 30	at San Diego State	Balboa Stadium; San Diego CA	W 19–13	6,000	
December 21	vs. North Texas State Teachers*	Public School Stadium; Houston, TX (Optimist Bowl)	L 13–14		
*Non-conference game; ^{†}Homecoming; Rankings from AP Poll released prior to the game
