= 1946 San Jose State Spartans football team =

American college football season

1946 San Jose State Spartans football
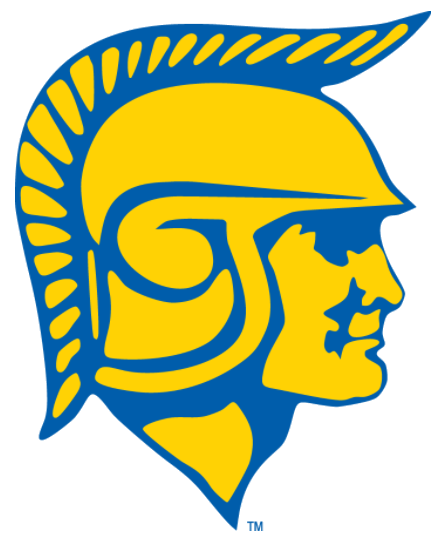

CCAA champion Raisin Bowl champion

Raisin Bowl, W 20–0 vs. Utah State
- Conference: California Collegiate Athletic Association
- Record: 9–1–1 (4–0 CCAA)
- Head coach: Wilbur V. Hubbard (1st season)
- Home stadium: Spartan Stadium

1946 California Collegiate Athletic Association football standings
	Conf.					Overall
Team	W		L		T	W		L		T
San Jose State $	4	–	0	–	0	9	–	1	–	1
Fresno State	2	–	2	–	0	8	–	4	–	0
San Diego State	2	–	2	–	0	6	–	4	–	0
Pacific (CA)	2	–	2	–	0	4	–	7	–	0
Santa Barbara	0	–	4	–	0	2	–	6	–	0
$ – Conference champion

The 1946 San Jose State Spartans football team represented San Jose State College (Note: San Jose State University was known as San Jose State College from 1935 to 1971.) during the 1946 college football season.

San Jose State competed in the California Collegiate Athletic Association. The team was led by head coach Wilbur V. Hubbard, in his first year, and they played home games at Spartan Stadium in San Jose, California. They finished the season as Champion of the CCAA, with a record of nine wins and one loss and one tie (9–1–1, 4–0 CCAA). At the end of the season, the Spartans were invited to the second annual Raisin Bowl, played in Fresno, California vs. the Mountain States Conference co-champion, Utah State Agricultural (Note: Utah State University was known as Utah State Agricultural College from 1929 to 1957.) Aggies. On January 1, 1947, San Jose State shut out Utah State 20–0. This was the first bowl appearance for San Jose State.

== Schedule ==
Date	Opponent	Site	Result	Attendance	Source
September 27	Willamette*	Spartan Stadium; San Jose, CA	W 44–6		
October 5	at Hardin–Simmons*	Fair Park Stadium; Abilene, TX	L 7–34	5,000	
October 10	Hawaii All-Stars (Leilehua Alums)*	Spartan Stadium; San Jose, CA	T 19–19	12,000	
October 19	at Idaho*	Neale Stadium; Moscow, ID	W 26–14	2,500	
October 25	BYU*	Spartan Stadium; San Jose, CA	W 14–0	10,000	
November 1	at Santa Barbara	La Playa Stadium; Santa Barbara, CA	W 20–0		
November 8	at Pacific (CA)	Baxter Stadium; Stockton, CA (rivalry)	W 32–0		
November 16	at San Diego State	Balboa Stadium; San Diego, CA	W 6–0	11,000	
November 22	Fresno State	Spartan Stadium; San Jose, CA (rivalry)	W 13–2	7,500	
November 29	Portland*	Spartan Stadium; San Jose, CA	W 26–19	6,500	
January 1, 1947	Utah State*	Ratcliffe Stadium; Fresno, CA (Raisin Bowl)	W 20–0	13,000	
*Non-conference game

== Team players in the NFL ==
The following San Jose State players were selected in the 1947 NFL draft.

Player	Position	Round	Overall	NFL team
Frank Minini	Halfback – Blocking Back	3	23	Chicago Bears
