= Wallace Newman =

American football and baseball player and coach (1902–1985)

Biographical details
- Born: May 28, 1902
- Died: November 6, 1985 (aged 83); Whittier, California, U.S.

Playing career

Football
- 1922–1924: USC

Baseball
- 1923–1925: USC
- Position: Guard (football)

Coaching career (HC unless noted)

Football
- 1925–1928: Covina HS (CA)
- 1929–1950: Whittier

Baseball
- 1930–1943: Whittier
- 1958–1964: Whittier

Head coaching record
- Overall: 102–66–14 (college football)
- Bowls: 1–0

Accomplishments and honors

Championships
- Football; 8 SCC/SCIAC (1932, 1934–1935, 1939, 1941–1942, 1949–1950)

Wallace Joe "Chief" Newman (May 28, 1902 – November 6, 1985) was an American football and baseball player and coach. He served as the head football coach at Whittier College in Whittier, California from 1929 to 1950, compiling a record of 102–66–14. Newman also coached basketball and baseball at Whittier and was the school's athletic director.

Newman played football and baseball at the University of Southern California (USC). He played in the 1923 Rose Bowl, the first bowl game appearance for the USC Trojans. Newman coached at Covina High School in Covina, California for four years before he was hired at Whittier. Newman was Native American and an enrolled member of the La Jolla Band of Luiseno Indians and the Mission Creek Band of Mission Indians which he led as president from 1957 until shortly before termination. In the early 1930s, he coached Richard Nixon, who was a reserve player for Whittier and went on to become president of the United States. Newman was briefly considered for the post of Commissioner of Indian Affairs by Nixon during his presidency.

Newman died on November 6, 1985.

== Head coaching record ==
=== College football ===
Year	Team	Overall	Conference	Standing	Bowl/playoffs
Whittier Poets (Southern California Conference / Southern California Intercollegiate Athletic Conference) (1929–1950)
1929	Whittier	4–4–1	3–2–1	3rd	
1930	Whittier	5–3–1	4–1	2nd	
1931	Whittier	6–3	4–1	2nd	
1932	Whittier	10–1	5–1	1st	
1933	Whittier	4–4–2	4–1–2	T–2nd	
1934	Whittier	7–2–1	5–0	1st	
1935	Whittier	5–5	4–1	1st	
1936	Whittier	5–5	3–2	3rd	
1937	Whittier	2–6–2	2–2–1	4th	
1938	Whittier	7–1–2	2–0–2	2nd	
1939	Whittier	8–2–1	3–0–1	1st	
1940	Whittier	2–6–1	1–2–1	4th	
1941	Whittier	4–3–1	3–0–1	1st	
1942	Whittier	5–4	2–1	T–1st	
1943	No team—World War II				
1944	No team—World War II				
1945	No team—World War II				
1946	Whittier	3–5–1	2–1–1	2nd	
1947	Whittier	2–6–1	1–2–1	T–3rd	
1948	Whittier	6–4	2–2	3rd	
1949	Whittier	8–1	4–0	1st	
1950	Whittier	9–1	3–1	T–1st	W Aztec Bowl
Whittier:		102–66–14	57–20–11		
Total:		102–66–14			
National championship Conference title Conference division title or championship game berth
