= Gander Terry =

American football player and coach (1907–1991)

Biographical details
- Born: September 24, 1907
- Died: February 22, 1991 (aged 83); Rapid City, South Dakota, U.S.

Playing career

Football
- 1925–1928: Western Kentucky State Normal

Basketball
- 1925–1929: Western Kentucky State Normal

Coaching career (HC unless noted)

Football
- 1938–1941: Western Kentucky State Teachers
- 1946: San Diego State

Head coaching record
- Overall: 31–13–3 (football)

Accomplishments and honors

Championships
- Football; 2 KIAC (1938–1939)

William Lester "Gander" Terry (September 24, 1907 – February 22, 1991) was an American college football player and coach. He served as the head football coach at Western Kentucky State Teachers College from 1938 to 1941 and at San Diego State University in 1946, compiling a career college football coaching record of 31–13–3.

== Head coaching record ==
Year	Team	Overall	Conference	Standing	Bowl/playoffs
Western Kentucky State Teachers Hilltoppers (Kentucky Intercollegiate Athletic Conference / Southern Intercollegiate Athletic Association) (1938–1941)
1938	Western Kentucky State Teachers	7–2	2–0 / 4–1	T–1st / T–8th	
1939	Western Kentucky State Teachers	7–1–1	2–0–1 / 5–1–1	T–1st / T–5th	
1940	Western Kentucky State Teachers	7–1–1	1–0–1 / 4–1–1	3rd / T–5th	
1941	Western Kentucky State Teachers	4–5–1	2–0–1 / 3–1–1	/ T–6th	
Western Kentucky State Teachers:		25–9–3	16–4–3		
San Diego State (California Collegiate Athletic Association) (1946)
1946	San Diego State	6–4	2–2	T–2nd	
San Diego State:		6–4	2–2		
Total:		31–13–3			
National championship Conference title Conference division title or championship game berth
