= Charles Forster =

Charles Forster may refer to:

- Sir Charles Forster, 1st Baronet (1815–1891), English Liberal politician
- Charles Smith Forster (1786–1850), English banker and Conservative politician
- Charles French Blake-Forster (1851–1874), Irish writer
- Charles Farrar Forster (1848–1894), British vicar

== See also ==
- Charles Foster (disambiguation)
