= Charles Warren Foster =

American soldier and military officer

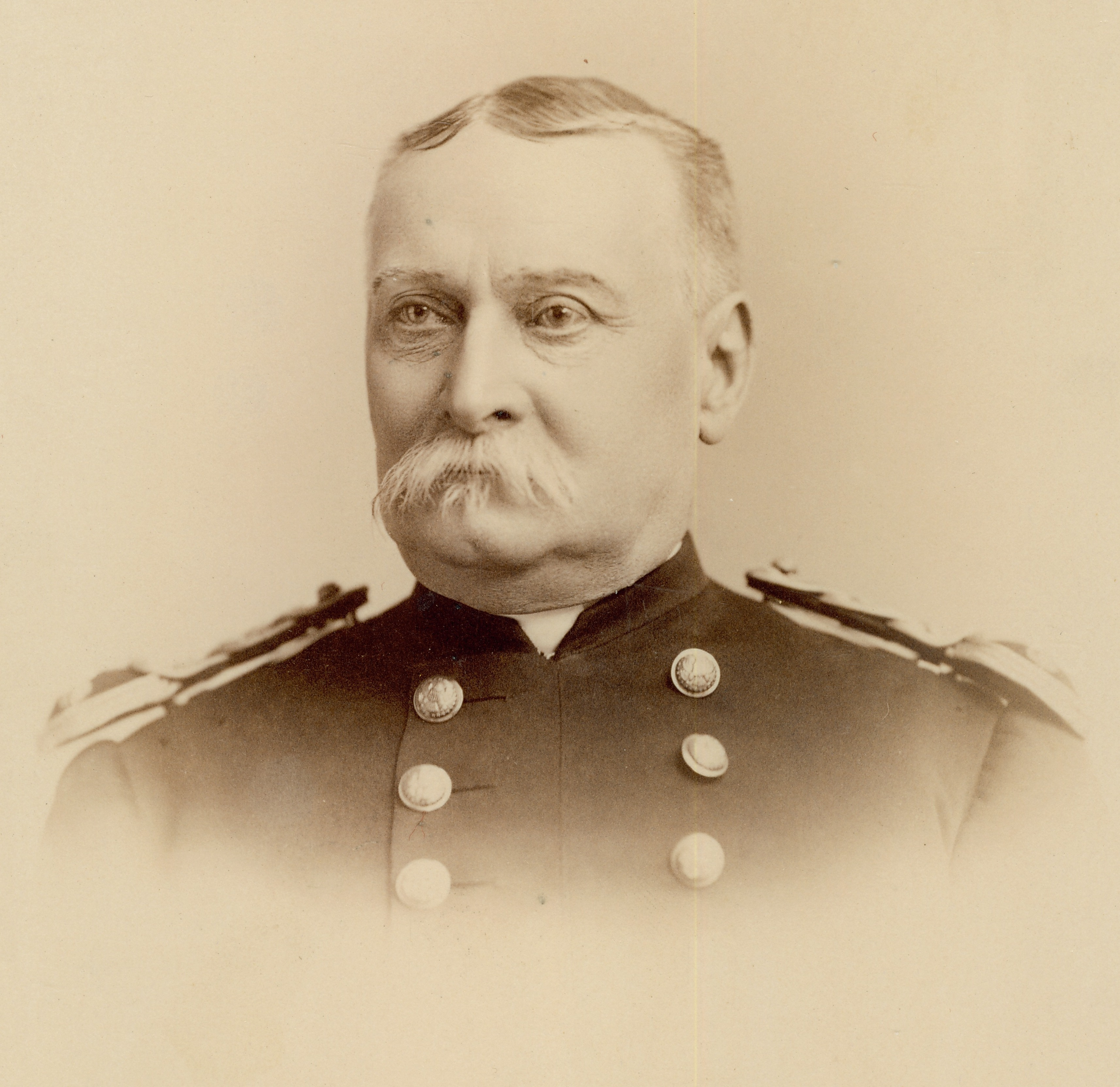
- Maj. Charles W. Foster
- Born: March 31, 1830; Salem, Massachusetts, US
- Died: May 10, 1904 (aged 74); Atlantic City, New Jersey, US
- Burial place: West Point Cemetery, New York, US
- Spouse: Anna Allen Foster (née Currier)
- Military career
- Allegiance: United States: Union
- Branch: United States Army; Union Army
- Service years: 1846–1856, 1861–1891
- Rank: Major; Brevet Colonel
- Unit: Company A, Corps of Engineers
- Commands: Bureau of Colored Troops
- Conflicts: Mexican-American War: Siege of Veracruz; Battle of Cerro Gordo; Siege of Puebla; American Civil War: Battle of Port Royal

Charles Warren Foster (March 31, 1830 – May 10, 1904) was an American soldier and military officer. He first served as an enlisted engineer and NCO in the United States Army during the Mexican–American War and then as a commissioned officer in the American Civil War. In the latter he notably headed the Bureau of Colored Troops, managing the recruitment and organization of African-American units for the Union Army.

== Biography ==
Foster was born in Salem, Massachusetts, on March 31, 1830. In June 1846, shortly after the outbreak of the Mexican–American War, he enlisted in the United States Army as a private in the Corps of Engineers. With a company of engineers he deployed to Mexico as part of Winfield Scott's army, serving at Veracruz, Cerro Gordo and Puebla. Ending the war as a sergeant, originally having enlisted in the Regular Army for five years, he spent the rest of his term as part of the garrison of the United States Military Academy at West Point, New York. Reenlisting for another term, he was put on surveying duty in Texas, returned to West Point, and then served at Key West, Florida. His second tour ended in August 1856.

After the Civil War had begun, he sought service in the Union Army, and in September 1861 he was commissioned captain in the United States Volunteers (USV). He was assigned to the staff of Brigadier General Horatio Wright as an assistant adjutant general. First he served as such at the Battle of Port Royal and in the campaigns in the Department of the South and then when Wright headed the Department of the Ohio. In early 1863, after the issue of the Emancipation Proclamation, the Union had begun recruiting colored men as soldiers on a national level. Units were organized in the field, e.g. along the Mississippi River by Adjutant General Lorenzo Thomas and in Louisiana by Daniel Ullmann. To centralize the various recruiting and organization efforts in the country, the Department of War established the Bureau of Colored Troops on May 22, 1863, with General Order No. 143. Headquartered in Washington, D.C., Foster was chosen as Chief of the Bureau. Recruitment was authorized for various commanders, governors and bureau commissioners, while several boards of examination were established to get qualified officers for the new units, and by October some 58 regiments had already been organized. Eventually the number of units of the United States Colored Troops would almost triple. Foster headed the bureau for the duration of the war and was promoted to major in August 1863, receiving brevets to lieutenant colonel and colonel in the USV in 1864. In 1865 he also received a Regular Army commission, being made captain in the Quartermaster Corps and receiving regular brevets to major, lieutenant colonel and colonel for his war service. He continued to lead the bureau during the early Reconstruction era, until it was disestablished in October 1867, at the same time mustering out of the USV.

Foster remained in the army, now with his regular commission as captain and quartermaster, and in 1868 went with an expedition to Alaska. In the following years he served on various posts in the departments of California, Arizona, Dakota, Utah and eventually back in the East, being promoted to major in 1883. He stayed on duty until 1891, when he retired after 40 years of service. Charles W. Foster died in a hotel in Atlantic City, New Jersey, on May 10, 1904, after a protracted illness. He was married to Anna Allen Currier Foster, and their son Pierce Currier Foster (born 1878) served in the army as well. A graduate of West Point, class of 1899, the 2nd lieutenant immediately went to serve in the Philippine–American War. However, he contracted typhoid fever and died in June of the same year. The whole family is interred in a small family mausoleum on West Point Cemetery.
