= 1946 Northwest Conference football season =

- Sport: Football
- Teams: 7
- Champion: Willamette

Football seasons

1946 Northwest Conference football standings
	Conf.					Overall
Team	W		L		T	W		L		T
Willamette $	6	–	0	–	0	6	–	2	–	1
College of Idaho	4	–	2	–	0	6	–	4	–	0
Linfield	3	–	2	–	1	4	–	4	–	0
Puget Sound	3	–	2	–	1	3	–	4	–	1
Pacific (OR)	3	–	3	–	0	4	–	3	–	1
Whitman	1	–	5	–	0	2	–	5	–	0
British Columbia	0	–	6	–	0	0	–	7	–	0
Lewis & Clark			–			3	–	4	–	1
$ – Conference champion

The 1946 Northwest Conference football season was the season of college football played by the seven member schools of the Northwest Conference (NWC) as part of the 1946 college football season.

The Willamette Bearcats won the NWC championship with a 6–2–1 record (6–0 against conference opponents) and outscored all opponents by a total of 129 to 94. The College of Idaho Coyotes finished in second place, compiled a 6–4 record, and led the conference in scoring offense with an average of 15.7 points per game. The Puget Sound Loggers tied for third place with a 3–4–1 overall record, but led the conference in scoring defense, giving up an average of only 6.5 points per game.

== Conference overview ==
Conf. rank	Team	Head coach	Conf. record	Overall record	Points scored	Points against
1	Willamette	Walt Erickson	6–0	6–2–1	129	94
2	College of Idaho	Clem Parberry	5–2	6–4	157	125
3 (tie)	Linfield	Wayne Harn	3–2–1	4–3–1	102	72
3 (tie)	Puget Sound	Frank W. Patrick	3–2–1	3–4–1	106	52
5	Pacific (OR)	Oswald D. Gates	3–3	4–3–1	58	60
6	Whitman	Vincent Borleske	1–5	2–5	34	79
7	British Columbia	Greg Kabat	0–6	0–7	39	169
8	Lewis & Clark	Robert L. Mathews	–	3–4–1		

== Teams ==
=== Willamette ===
1946 Willamette Bearcats football

NWC champion
- Conference: Northwest Conference
- Record: 6–2–1 (6–0 NWC)
- Head coach: Walt Erickson (1st season)

The 1946 Willamette Bearcats football team epresented the Willamette University of Salem, Oregon. In their first and only season under head coach Walt Erickson, the team compiled a 6–2–1 record (6–0 against NWC opponents) and outscored opponent by a total of 129 to 94.

Three Willamette players were unanimous selections to the 1946 All-Northwest Conference football team: Marv Goodman at end; Garrell Deiner at tackle, and Larry McKeel at back. End Bill Reder and back Bob Douglas received second-team honors.

Date	Opponent	Site	Result	Attendance	Source
September 27	at San Jose State*	Spartan Stadium; San Jose, CA	L 6–44	13,000	
October 5	at UBC	Vancouver, BC	W 26–13		
October 11	Linfield	Sweetland Field; Salem, OR	W 31–6		
October 18	College of Idaho	Sweetland Field; Salem, OR	W 27–7		
October 26	Puget Sound	Sweetland Field; Salem, OR	W 7–0	3,000	
November 1	at Portland*	Multnomah Stadium; Portland, OR	T 6–6	5,000	
November 9	at Pacific (OR)	Forest Grove, OR	W 6–0		
November 16	at Whittier*	Whittier Stadium; Whittier, CA	L 13–18	4,000	
November 28	at Whitman	Borleske Stadium; Walla Walla, WA	W 7–0		
*Non-conference game

=== College of Idaho ===
1946 College of Idaho Coyotes football
- Conference: Northwest Conference
- Record: 6–4 (5–2 NWC)
- Head coach: Clem Parberry (6th season)

The 1946 College of Idaho Coyotes football team represented the College of Idaho of Caldwell, Idaho. In their sixth year under head coach Clem Parberry, the team compiled a 6–4 record (5–2 against NWC opponents), finished in second place in the Northwest Conference, and outscored opponents by a total of 157 to 125.

Date	Opponent	Site	Result	Attendance	Source
September 28	Eastern Oregon*	Hayman Field; Caldwell, ID	W 25–12		
October 5	at Linfield	McMinnville, OR	L 13–14		
October 11	Whitman	Hayman Field; Caldwell, ID	W 14–6		
October 18	Willamette	Sweetland Field; Salem, OR	L 7–27		
October 26	at British Columbia	Vancouver, BC	W 19–7		
November 2	Pacific (OR)	Hayman Field; Caldwell, ID	W 21–6		
November 9	at Idaho State*	Spud Bowl; Pocatello, ID	L 18–26		
November 16	Puget Sound^{†}	Hayman Field; Caldwell, ID	W 13–7	2,500	
November 23	at Boise Junior College*	College Field; Boise, ID	L 6–20	2,000	
November 29	at Lewis & Clark	Portland, OR	W 21–0		
*Non-conference game; ^{†}Homecoming

=== Linfield ===
1946 Linfield Wildcats football
- Conference: Northwest Conference
- Record: 4–3–1 (3–2–1 NWC)
- Head coach: Wayne Harn

The 1946 Linfield Wildcats football team represented the Linfield University of McMinnville, Oregon. Led by head coach Wayne Harn, the team compiled a 4–3–1 record (3–2–1 against NWC opponents), tied for third place in the Northwest Conference, and outscored opponents by a total of 102 to 72.

Date	Opponent	Site	Result	Attendance	Source
September 27	at Humboldt State	Albee Stadium; Eureka, CA	L 0–13		
October 5	College of Idaho	McMinnville, OR	W 14–13		
October 11	at Willamette	Sweetland Field; Salem, OR	L 6–31		
October 19	Puget Sound	McMinnvile, OR	T 6–6		
October 26	Pacific (OR)	Forest Grove, OR	L 0–9		
November 2	at Whitman	Walla Walla, WA	W 20–0		
November 9	at British Columbia	Varsity Stadium; Vancouver, BC	W 13–0	1,200	
November 16	Lewis & Clark		W 43–0		

=== Puget Sound ===
1946 Puget Sound Loggers football
- Conference: Northwest Conference
- Record: 3–4–1 (3–2–1 NWC)
- Head coach: Frank W. Patrick

The 1946 Puget Sound Loggers football team represented the University of Puget Sound of Tacoma, Washington. Led by head coach Frank W. Patrick, the team compiled a 3–4–1 record (3–2–1 against NWC opponents), tied for third place in the Northwest Conference, and outscored opponents by a total of 106 to 52.

Date	Opponent	Site	Result	Attendance	Source
October 5	Western Washington*	Battersby Field; Bellingham, WA	L 6–7		
October 12	Pacific (OR)	Tacoma Stadium; Tacoma, WA	W 33–0		
October 19	at Linfield		T 6–6		
October 26	at Willamette	Sweetland Field; Salem, OR	L 0–7	3,000	
November 2	British Columbia	Tacoma Stadium; Tacoma, WA	W 34–6		
November 9	Whitman	Tacoma Stadium; Tacoma, WA	W 13–0		
November 16	at College of Idaho	Hayman Field; Caldwell, ID	L 7–13	2,500	
November 27	Pacific Lutheran*	Tacoma Stadium; Tacoma, WA	L 7–13	3,000	
*Non-conference game

=== Pacific (OR) ===
1946 Pacific Badgers football
- Conference: Northwest Conference
- Record: 4–3–1 (3–3 NWC)
- Head coach: Oswald D. Gates

The 1946 Pacific Badgers football team represented the Pacific University of Forest Grove, Oregon. Led by head coach Oswald D. Gates, the team compiled a 4–3–1 record (3–3 against NWC opponents), finished in fifth place in the Northwest Conference, and were outscored by a total of 60 to 58.

Date	Opponent	Site	Result	Attendance	Source
September 28	Everett Junior College		W 6–0		
October 4	Whitman	Walla Walla, WA	W 6–0		
October 12	at Puget Sound	Tacoma Stadium; Tacoma, WA	L 0–33		
October 19	Lewis & Clark		T 0–0		
October 26	at Linfield	Forest Grove, OR	W 9–0		
November 2	at College of Idaho	Hayman Field; Caldwell, ID	L 6–21		
November 9	Willamette	Forest Grove, OR	L 0–6		
November 15	British Columbia	Forest Grove, OR	W 31–0		

=== Whitman ===
1946 Whitman Fighting Missionaries football
- Conference: Northwest Conference
- Record: 2–5 (1–5 NWC)
- Head coach: Vincent Borleske (32nd season)

The 1946 Whitman Fighting Missionaries football team represented Whitman College of Walla Walla, Washington. In their 32nd season under head coach Vincent Borleske, the team compiled a 2–5 record (1–5 against NWC opponents), finished in sixth place in the Northwest Conference, and were outscored by a total of 79 to 34.

Date	Opponent	Site	Result	Attendance	Source
September 28	Whitworth	Borleske Stadium; Walla Walla, WA	W 7–6		
October 4	Pacific (OR)	Borleske Stadium; Walla Walla, WA	L 0–6		
October 11	at College of Idaho*	Hayman Field; Caldwell, ID	L 6–14		
October 19	at British Columbia*	Varsity Stadium; Vancouver, BC	W 21–13		
November 2	Linfield	Borleske Stadium; Walla Walla, WA	L 0–20		
November 9	at Puget Sound	Tacoma Stadium; Tacoma, WA	L 0–13		
November 28	Willamette	Borleske Stadium; Walla Walla, WA	L 0–7		
*Non-conference game

=== British Columbia ===
1946 British Columbia Thunderbirds football
- Conference: Northwest Conference
- Record: 0–7 (0–6 NWC)
- Head coach: Greg Kabat

The 1946 British Columbia Thunderbirds football team represented the University of British Columbia of Vancouver, British Columbia. Led by head coach Greg Kabat, the Thunderbirds compiled a 0–7 record (0–6 against NWC opponents), finished in seventh place in the Northwest Conference, and were outscored by a total of 169 to 39.

Date	Opponent	Site	Result	Attendance	Source
	Willamette		L 13–26		
	Western Washington		L 0–25		
	Whitman		L 13–21		
	College of Idaho		L 7–19		
	Puget Sound		L 6–34		
	Linfield		L 0–13		
	Pacific (OR)		L 0–31		

== All-conference team ==
The 1946 All-Northwest conference football team was selected by coaches and faculty of the conference schools. Players named to the first team were:

- Ends – Arnold Torgenson (or Thorgerson), Pacific; Marvin Goodman, Willamette
- Tackles – Garrell (or Gerald) Deiner, Willamette; Steuben Thomas, College of Idaho
- Guards – Bill Dahlgren, Pacific; William Currier, Linfield
- Center – Maitland Anderson, Pacific
- Backs – Larry McKeel (or McKell), Willamette; Warren Wood, Puget Sound; Jon Seeley, Linfield; Tom Oxman, College of Idaho
