= 1946 Cal Poly Mustangs football team =

American college football season

1946 Cal Poly Mustangs football
- Conference: Independent
- Record: 6–2–1
- Head coach: Howie O'Daniels (10th season)
- Home stadium: Mustang Stadium

1946 Western non-major college football independents records
	Conf.			Overall
Team	W	L	T	W		L		T
Southern Oregon		–		8	–	0	–	0
Pepperdine		–		8	–	1	–	0
Hawaii		–		8	–	2	–	0
Cal Poly		–		6	–	2	–	1
Loyola (CA)		–		5	–	4	–	0
Idaho Southern Branch		–		4	–	3	–	1
San Francisco State		–		3	–	3	–	0
Boise State		–		3	–	4	–	2
Eastern Oregon		–		2	–	5	–	0
La Verne		–		0	–	5	–	0

The 1946 Cal Poly Mustangs football team represented California Polytechnic School—now known as California Polytechnic State University, San Luis Obispo—as am independent during the 1946 college football season. Led by Howie O'Daniels, who returned for his tenth season as head coach after having helmed the team from 1933 to 1941, the Mustangs compiled a record of 6–2–1. The team outscored opponents 152 to 88 for the season. Cal Poly played home games at Mustang Stadium in San Luis Obispo, California.

The Mustangs played two games against non-collegiate military teams, San Diego Naval Training Station and the El Toro Marines.

== Schedule ==
Date	Opponent	Site	Result	Attendance	Source
September 28	at Santa Barbara	La Playa Stadium; Santa Barbara, CA	L 6–19		
October 5	at San Diego State	Balboa Stadium; San Diego, CA	W 21–13	6,000	
October 12	Occidental	Mustang Stadium; San Luis Obispo, CA	T 7–7		
October 19	San Francisco State	Mustang Stadium; San Luis Obispo, CA	W 7–6		
October 26	Whittier	Mustang Stadium; San Luis Obispo, CA	W 13–2		
November 2	San Diego NTS (Note: Naval Training Center San Diego (Naval Training Station) was a U.S. Navy facility from 1923 to 1997.)	Mustang Stadium; San Luis Obispo, CA	W 34–6		
November 9	at Pepperdine	Sentinel Field; Inglewood, California	L 18–28	7,000	
November 16	El Toro Marines (Note: Marine Corps Air Station El Toro was a U.S. Marine air station located in Orange County, California from 1943 to 1999.)	Mustang Stadium; San Luis Obispo, CA	W 26–0	3,000	
November 23	Chico State	Mustang Stadium; San Luis Obispo, CA	W 20–7		
