= Al Simpson =

American football coach (1916–1976)

Biographical details
- Born: July 19, 1916; Eureka, California, U.S.
- Died: September 13, 1976 (aged 60); Cottage Grove, Oregon, U.S.

Coaching career (HC unless noted)

Football
- 1946–1950: Southern Oregon

Basketball
- 1946–1947: Southern Oregon

Head coaching record
- Overall: 27–16–1 (football); 23–3 (basketball)
- Bowls: 1–2

Accomplishments and honors

Championships
- Football; 2 Far Western (1947–1948)

Alexander Irving Simpson (July 19, 1916 – September 13, 1976) was an American football coach. He served as the head football coach at Southern Oregon College of Education—now known as Southern Oregon University—in Ashland, Oregon for five seasons, from 1946 until 1950. His coaching record at Southern Oregon was 27–16–1.

Simpson was a graduate of Southern Oregon and the University of Oregon, in the years 1937 and 1939 respectively. Prior to coaching at Southern Oregon, he had coached in high schools in Oregon, including in Ashland and Medford.

== Head coaching record ==
=== Football ===
| Year | Team | Overall | Conference | Standing | Bowl/playoffs |
|---|---|---|---|---|---|
Southern Oregon Red Raiders (Independent) (1946)
| 1946 | Southern Oregon | 8–0 | | | W Pear |
Southern Oregon Red Raiders (Far Western Conference) (1947–1950)
| 1947 | Southern Oregon | 7–2 | 3–1 | T–1st | L Pear |
| 1948 | Southern Oregon | 5–5 | 3–1 | T–1st | L Pear |
| 1949 | Southern Oregon | 5–2–1 | 2–1–1 | 2nd | |
| 1950 | Southern Oregon | 3–7 | 1–3 | 4th | |
| Southern Oregon: | | 27–16–1 | 9–6–1 | | |
| Total: | | 27–16–1 | | | |
National championship Conference title Conference division title or championship game berth
