= 1946 Hawaii Rainbows football team =

American college football season

1946 Hawaii Rainbows football

Pineapple Bowl, W 19–16 vs. Utah
- Conference: Independent
- Record: 8–2
- Head coach: Tom Kaulukukui (2nd season)
- Home stadium: Honolulu Stadium

1946 Western non-major college football independents records
	Conf.			Overall
Team	W	L	T	W		L		T
Southern Oregon		–		8	–	0	–	0
Pepperdine		–		8	–	1	–	0
Hawaii		–		8	–	2	–	0
Cal Poly		–		6	–	2	–	1
Loyola (CA)		–		5	–	4	–	0
Idaho Southern Branch		–		4	–	3	–	1
San Francisco State		–		3	–	3	–	0
Boise State		–		3	–	4	–	2
Eastern Oregon		–		2	–	5	–	0
La Verne		–		0	–	5	–	0

The 1946 Hawaii Rainbows football team was an American football team that represented the University of Hawaii as an independent during the 1946 college football season. In its second non-consecutive season under Tom Kaulukukui, the team compiled an 8–2 record and outscored opponents by a total of 275 to 93.

== Schedule ==
Date	Opponent	Site	Result	Attendance	Source
September 25	Hawaiian Pine	Honolulu Stadium; Honolulu, Territory of Hawaii	W 14–6	8,000	
October 2	Kaala	Honolulu Stadium; Honolulu, Territory of Hawaii	W 44–0	3,500	
October 9	Olympic	Honolulu Stadium; Honolulu, Territory of Hawaii	W 27–0		
October 16	Lanakila	Honolulu Stadium; Honolulu, Territory of Hawaii	W 73–6	2,500	
November 1	at Pacific (CA)	Baxter Stadium; Stockton, CA	W 19–13	7,000	
November 11	at Fresno State	Ratcliffe Stadium; Fresno, CA (rivalry)	W 7–2	15,000	
November 27	Healani	Honolulu Stadium; Honolulu, Territory of Hawaii	W 58–6		
December 7	Nevada	Honolulu Stadium; Honolulu, Territory of Hawaii (Shrine Benefit Aloha Bowl)	L 7–26	25,000	
December 23	Stanford	Honolulu Stadium; Honolulu, Territory of Hawaii	L 7–18	17,000	
January 1, 1947	Utah	Honolulu Stadium; Honolulu, Territory of Hawaii (Pineapple Bowl)	W 19–16	20,000	
