= 1946 San Diego State Aztecs football team =

American college football season

1946 San Diego State Aztecs football
- Conference: California Collegiate Athletic Association
- Record: 6–4 (2–2 CCAA)
- Head coach: Gander Terry (1st season)
- Home stadium: Aztec Bowl

1946 California Collegiate Athletic Association football standings
	Conf.					Overall
Team	W		L		T	W		L		T
San Jose State $	4	–	0	–	0	9	–	1	–	1
Fresno State	2	–	2	–	0	8	–	4	–	0
San Diego State	2	–	2	–	0	6	–	4	–	0
Pacific (CA)	2	–	2	–	0	4	–	7	–	0
Santa Barbara	0	–	4	–	0	2	–	6	–	0
$ – Conference champion

The 1946 San Diego State Aztecs football team represented San Diego State College—now known as San Diego State University—as a member of the California Collegiate Athletic Association (CCAA) during the 1946 college football season. Led by first-year head coach Gander Terry, the Aztecs compiled an overall record of 6–4 with a mark of 2–2 in conference play, placing in a three-way tie for second in the CCAA. San Diego State team outscored its opponents 152–105 for the season. The team played home games at Balboa Stadium in San Diego.

== Schedule ==
Date	Opponent	Site	Result	Attendance	Source
September 28	Pomona*	Balboa Stadium; San Diego, CA	W 34–0	10,000	
October 5	Cal Poly*	Balboa Stadium; San Diego, CA	L 13–21	6,000	
October 12	at Whittier*	Hadley Field; Whittier, CA	W 35–7		
October 19	Nevada*	Balboa Stadium; San Diego, CA	L 0–26	20,000	
October 26	Fresno State	Balboa Stadium; San Diego, CA (rivalry)	W 7–0	8,000	
November 2	Occidental*^{†}	Balboa Stadium; San Diego, CA	W 21–12	7,500	
November 8	at Loyola (CA)*	Gilmore Stadium; Los Angeles, CA	W 20–7	5,500–6,000	
November 16	San Jose State	Balboa Stadium; San Diego, CA	L 0–6	11,000	
November 23	at Santa Barbara	La Playa Stadium; Santa Barbara, CA	W 9–7		
November 30	Pacific (CA)	Balboa Stadium; San Diego, CA	L 13–19	6,000	
*Non-conference game; ^{†}Homecoming
