= 1946 San Francisco State Gators football team =

American college football season

1946 San Francisco State Gators football
- Conference: Independent
- Record: 3–3
- Head coach: Dick Boyle (4th season)
- Home stadium: Cox Stadium

1946 Western non-major college football independents records
	Conf.			Overall
Team	W	L	T	W		L		T
Southern Oregon		–		8	–	0	–	0
Pepperdine		–		8	–	1	–	0
Hawaii		–		8	–	2	–	0
Cal Poly		–		6	–	2	–	1
Loyola (CA)		–		5	–	4	–	0
Idaho Southern Branch		–		4	–	3	–	1
San Francisco State		–		3	–	3	–	0
Boise State		–		3	–	4	–	2
Eastern Oregon		–		2	–	5	–	0
La Verne		–		0	–	5	–	0

The 1946 San Francisco State Gators football team represented San Francisco State College (now known as San Francisco State University) as an independent during the 1946 college football season. San Francisco State and Southern Oregon joined Far Western Conference in 1946, but did not play any conference games, and their games did not count in the conference standings. Led by fourth-year head coach Dick Boyle, who return for his second stint after helming the team from 1939 to 1941, the Gators compiled a record of 3–3 and outscored their opponents 71 to 60. They played home games at Cox Stadium in San Francisco.

== Schedule ==
Date	Opponent	Site	Result	Source
September 28	Placer*	Cox Stadium; San Francisco, CA	W 13–7	
October 12	at Cal Aggies*	A Street field; Davis, CA	W 13–6	
October 19	at Cal Poly*	Mustang Stadium; San Luis Obispo, CCA	L 6–7	
October 26	Humboldt State*	Cox Stadium; San Francisco, CA	L 7–14	
November 2	Chico State*	Cox Stadium; San Francisco, CA	W 26–0	
November 11	at Southern Oregon*	Walter E. Phillips Field?; Ashland, OR	L 6–26	
*Non-conference game
