= Joseph Forbes =

American sports coach and professor

Biographical details
- Born: March 2, 1910; Illinois, U.S.
- Died: January 20, 1976 (aged 65); Humboldt County, California, U.S.

Coaching career (HC unless noted)

Football
- 1946–1947: Humboldt state

Basketball
- 1946–1949: Humboldt state
- 1952–1953: Humboldt state

Head coaching record
- Overall: 10–7–1 (football); 32–39 (basketball)

Joseph M. Forbes (March 2, 1910 – January 20, 1976) was an American college football and college basketball coach and physical education professor. He was the head football coach at Humboldt State College—now known as Humboldt State University—from 1946 to 1947, compiling a record of 10–7–1. Forbes served two stints at the head basketball coach at Humboldt State, from 1946 to 1949 and again for the 1952–53 season, tallying mark of 32–39. He was also a professor at Humboldt State for 27 years chairman o the Department of Health and Physical Educator for 25 years until his retirement in 1972. Forbes died on January 20, 1976.

== Head coaching record ==
=== Football ===
Year	Team	Overall	Conference	Standing	Bowl/playoffs
Humboldt State Lumberjacks (Far Western Conference) (1946–1947)
1946	Humboldt State	5–3–1	1–0–1	1st	
1947	Humboldt State	5–4	2–2	3rd	
Humboldt State:		10–7–1	3–2–1		
Total:		10–7–1			
