= General Order No. 143 =

1863 directive authorizing the creation of African- American regiments of the U.S. Army

General Order No. 143 was an 1863 military directive of the United States War Department which authorized the establishment of a Bureau of Colored Troops, tasked with regulating the recruitment, training and organization of the U.S. Army's first regiments composed entirely of African-American soldiers. While state-raised units like the 1st South Carolina Volunteers and the 54th Massachusetts Infantry Regiment had already begun recruitment and training, the order issued May 22, 1863, directly created a new designation among regular U.S. Army regiments: United States Colored Troops.

== Bibliography ==
- Cornish, Dudley Taylor. The Sable Arm: Negro Troops in the Union Army, 1861–1865. New York: W.W. Norton, 1965.
