= Big Eight Conference (California) =

Junior college athletic conference in California

The Big Eight Conference was a junior college athletic conference with member schools located in the San Francisco Bay Area and Central California that operated from 1950 to 1962. The conference began operation as the Big Seven Conference for the 1950–51 basketball season. The conference's initial seven members were Modesto Junior College, Sacramento City College, City College of San Francisco (CCSF), the College of San Mateo, Santa Rosa Junior College, Stockton College—now known as San Joaquin Delta College, and West Contra Costa Junior College—now known as Contra Costa College. Oakland City College joined as the league's eighth member for the 1954–55 basketball season. The Big Eight Conference dissolved in 1962. Four of its members—CCSF, Contra Costa, Oakland City, and San Mateo—joined the newly-formed Golden Gate Conference. Three members—Modesto, Stockton, and Sacramento City—joined the incipient Valley Conference. Santa Rosa joined the Golden Valley Conference.

== Yearly football standings ==
1951 Big Seven Conference (California) football standings
	Conf.					Overall
Team	W		L		T	W		L		T
CC of San Francisco $	6	–	0	–	0	7	–	2	–	0
Stockton	3	–	1	–	2	5	–	3	–	2
Sacramento City	3	–	3	–	0	5	–	3	–	0
Modesto	3	–	3	–	0	6	–	4	–	0
San Mateo	2	–	3	–	1	3	–	5	–	1
Santa Rosa	2	–	3	–	1	3	–	5	–	1
West Contra Costa	0	–	6	–	0	2	–	7	–	0
$ – Conference champion

1952 Big Seven Conference (California) football standings
	Conf.					Overall
Team	W		L		T	W		L		T
Stockton $	6	–	0	–	0	7	–	2	–	0
Modesto	4	–	2	–	0	7	–	2	–	0
West Contra Costa	4	–	2	–	0	6	–	3	–	0
Santa Rosa	4	–	2	–	0	6	–	4	–	0
CC of San Francisco	2	–	4	–	0	3	–	6	–	0
Sacramento City	1	–	5	–	0	3	–	5	–	0
San Mateo	0	–	6	–	0	0	–	9	–	0
$ – Conference champion

1953 Big Seven Conference (California) football standings
	Conf.					Overall
Team	W		L		T	W		L		T
West Contra Costa $	6	–	0	–	0	9	–	1	–	0
CC of San Francisco	4	–	1	–	1	4	–	3	–	2
Modesto	4	–	2	–	0	7	–	3	–	0
Stockton	3	–	3	–	0	5	–	5	–	0
Santa Rosa	2	–	3	–	1	4	–	5	–	1
Sacramento City	1	–	5	–	0	3	–	6	–	0
San Mateo	0	–	6	–	0	1	–	8	–	0
$ – Conference champion

1954 Big Seven Conference (California) football standings
	Conf.					Overall
Team	W		L		T	W		L		T
West Contra Costa +	5	–	1	–	0	7	–	1	–	0
Santa Rosa +	5	–	1	–	0	5	–	3	–	0
CC of San Francisco	4	–	1	–	1	6	–	1	–	1
Sacramento City	3	–	3	–	0	4	–	4	–	0
Stockton	1	–	3	–	2	1	–	4	–	3
Modesto	1	–	4	–	1	1	–	7	–	1
San Mateo	0	–	6	–	0	0	–	8	–	0
+ – Conference co-champions

1955 Big Eight Conference (California) football standings
	Conf.					Overall
Team	W		L		T	W		L		T
Stockton $	6	–	0	–	1	7	–	2	–	1
CC of San Francisco	6	–	1	–	0	9	–	1	–	0
Modesto	4	–	3	–	0	5	–	4	–	0
West Contra Costa	3	–	3	–	1	5	–	3	–	1
Santa Rosa	3	–	3	–	1	4	–	4	–	2
Oakland City	1	–	4	–	2	2	–	4	–	2
Sacramento City	1	–	5	–	1	2	–	6	–	1
San Mateo	1	–	6	–	0	2	–	7	–	0
$ – Conference champion

1956 Big Eight Conference (California) football standings
	Conf.					Overall
Team	W		L		T	W		L		T
Stockton $	7	–	0	–	0	9	–	1	–	0
CC of San Francisco	6	–	1	–	0	6	–	2	–	0
Santa Rosa	5	–	2	–	0	5	–	4	–	0
Oakland City	4	–	3	–	0	4	–	5	–	0
Modesto	3	–	4	–	0	3	–	6	–	0
Sacramento City	1	–	6	–	0	2	–	7	–	0
West Contra Costa	1	–	6	–	0	2	–	7	–	0
San Mateo	1	–	6	–	0	1	–	8	–	0
$ – Conference champion

1957 Big Eight Conference (California) football standings
	Conf.					Overall
Team	W		L		T	W		L		T
Stockton +	5	–	2	–	0	8	–	2	–	0
CC of San Francisco +	5	–	2	–	0	6	–	3	–	0
Santa Rosa +	5	–	2	–	0	6	–	3	–	0
Modesto +	5	–	2	–	0	5	–	4	–	0
West Contra Costa	4	–	3	–	0	6	–	3	–	0
Sacramento City	2	–	5	–	0	4	–	5	–	0
San Mateo	1	–	6	–	0	2	–	7	–	0
Oakland City	1	–	6	–	0	1	–	7	–	0
+ – Conference co-champions

1958 Big Eight Conference (California) football standings
	Conf.					Overall
Team	W		L		T	W		L		T
Stockton +	5	–	2	–	0	8	–	2	–	0
Modesto +	5	–	2	–	0	7	–	2	–	0
San Mateo +	5	–	2	–	0	7	–	2	–	0
Sacramento City +	5	–	2	–	0	7	–	3	–	0
Santa Rosa	3	–	4	–	0	5	–	4	–	0
CC of San Francisco	3	–	4	–	0	4	–	5	–	0
Contra Costa	1	–	6	–	0	2	–	7	–	0
Oakland City	1	–	6	–	0	2	–	7	–	0
+ – Conference co-champions

1959 Big Eight Conference (California) football standings
	Conf.					Overall
Team	W		L		T	W		L		T
Stockton $	6	–	1	–	0	8	–	2	–	0
San Mateo	4	–	1	–	2	4	–	1	–	2
Contra Costa	5	–	2	–	0	5	–	2	–	0
Oakland City	4	–	2	–	1	4	–	2	–	1
CC of San Francisco	3	–	4	–	0	3	–	4	–	0
Sacramento City	3	–	4	–	0	3	–	4	–	0
Modesto	1	–	5	–	1	2	–	6	–	1
Santa Rosa	0	–	7	–	0	0	–	7	–	0
$ – Conference champion

1960 Big Eight Conference (California) football standings
	Conf.					Overall
Team	W		L		T	W		L		T
San Mateo $	5	–	0	–	2	6	–	1	–	2
Stockton	5	–	1	–	1	5	–	3	–	1
CC of San Francisco	4	–	2	–	1	6	–	2	–	1
Oakland City	4	–	3	–	0	5	–	4	–	0
Sacramento City	3	–	4	–	0	4	–	5	–	0
Modesto	3	–	4	–	0	3	–	6	–	0
Contra Costa	2	–	5	–	0	4	–	5	–	0
Santa Rosa	0	–	7	–	0	2	–	7	–	0
$ – Conference champion

1961 Big Eight Conference (California) football standings
	Conf.					Overall
Team	W		L		T	W		L		T
San Mateo $	7	–	0	–	0	9	–	1	–	0
Sacramento City	5	–	2	–	0	7	–	2	–	0
CC of San Francisco	5	–	2	–	0	7	–	3	–	0
Contra Costa	5	–	2	–	0	6	–	3	–	0
Modesto	2	–	5	–	0	3	–	6	–	0
Santa Rosa	2	–	5	–	0	3	–	6	–	0
Stockton	2	–	5	–	0	2	–	7	–	0
Oakland City	0	–	7	–	0	1	–	7	–	0
$ – Conference champion
