= Bean Bowl =

Bean Bowl (defunct)
- Stadium: Bearcat Stadium
- Location: Scottsbluff, Nebraska
- Operated: 1949–1950

1950 matchup
- Doane College vs. Colorado State (14-6)

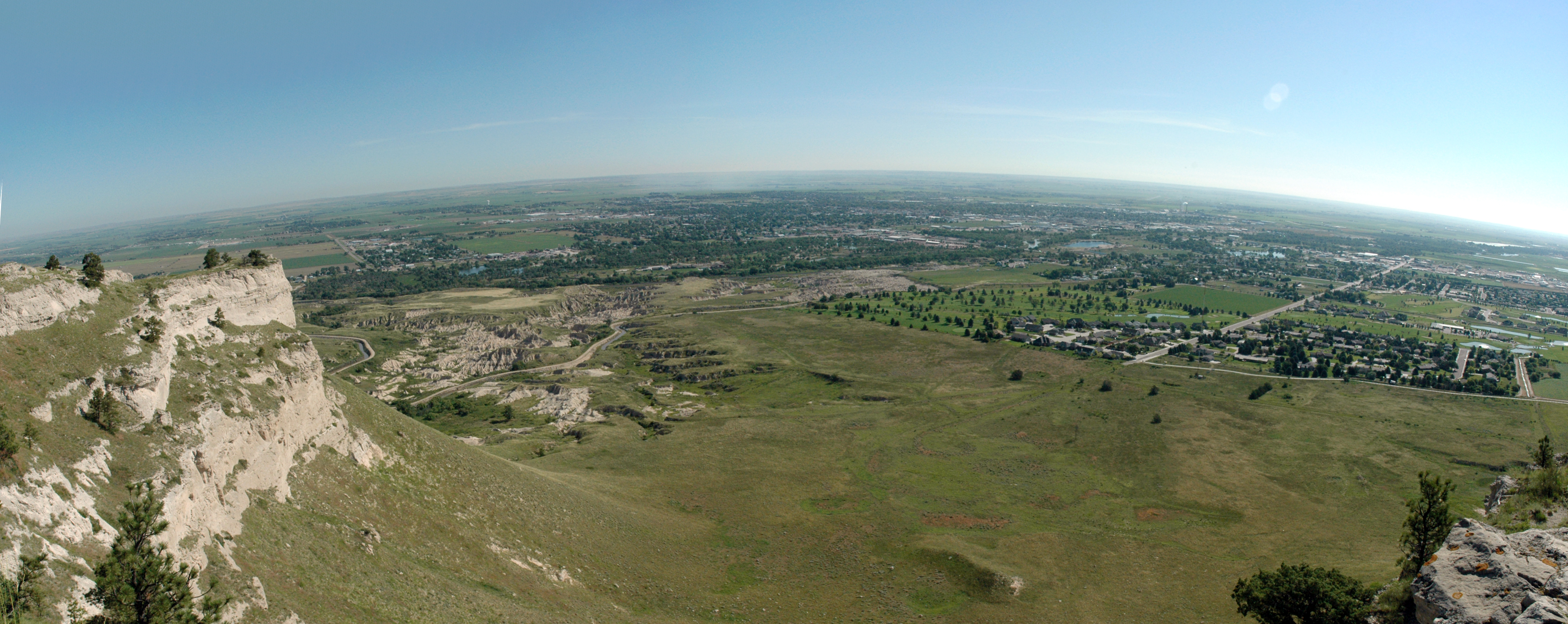
Scottsbluff Nebraska is the former home of the Bean Bowl.

The Bean Bowl was a non-NCAA-sanctioned North American College Football bowl game played in Scottsbluff, Nebraska, in 1949 and 1950.

The series was short-lived. It was developed with the goal of promoting the dry bean industry from the North Platte Valley. That area of Nebraska was a major regional hub for the cultivation for dry edible beans and more specifically, Great Northern and pinto beans. This is where the bowl got its name.

Local civic leaders and businessmen established the Bean Bowl not only to highlight collegiate athletics, but as a promotional vehicle to draw attention to the area's vital cash crop and drive holiday tourism. Hosted at Bearcat Stadium, a venue primarily used for local high school sports, the bowl was intentionally scheduled to become an annual Thanksgiving tradition for the community.

The game was held on Thanksgiving both years and was meant to remain on that holiday for the duration of the series.

== History ==
The Bean Bowl was part of a post-World War II trend of "small-college" bowl games intended to showcase regional athletes, similar to the High School Shrine Bowl. Like contemporary regional games such as the Glass Bowl or Refrigerator Bowl, it struggled with financial sustainability and logistical constraints caused by the monetary demands of the Korean War. The game was discontinued in 1950, following its second iteration.

Because the event operated outside the official sanctioning of the NCAA, it relied entirely on local ticket sales, community funding, and municipal sponsorships for its survival.

== Results ==
Game	Date	Winner		Loser		References
1949	November 24	Idaho State	20	Chadron State	2	
1950	November 23	Doane	14	Colorado State–Greeley	6	

== 1949 Game ==
The inaugural game of this holiday event featured Idaho State College, which is now Idaho State University, against Chadron State College. This matchup was the first ever postseason appearance for Chadron State. Idaho State were the victors, defeating the Eagles 2-2 in a game that was won on defense at Bearcat Stadium.

That season's Chadron State team was inducted into their Hall of Fame in 2011.

== 1950 Game ==
The final Bean Bowl took place on November 23, 1950. The game featured Doane University, which is now Doane College, against Colorado State College. Colorado State is now known as the University of Northern Colorado. Doane is a college based in Crete, Nebraska and they won the matchup 14-6. The Tigers consider this bowl win to be the first won by any team from Nebraska.
