= National Orange Show =

Annual festival in San Bernardino, California

Coordinates: 34.0885°N 117.2898°W

- Status: Active
- Genre: Fair
- Frequency: Annually
- Venue: National Orange Show & Event Center
- Locations: 689 South E Street San Bernardino, CA 92408
- Years active: 115
- Inaugurated: March 6, 1911
- Founder: Harry Perkins
- Website: https://nosevents.com/ https://nationalorangeshow.com/

Postcard advertising the 17th show in 1927

The National Orange Show Festival, founded simply as the Orange Show, is an annual fair held in San Bernardino, California since 1911 to promote the citrus industry.

== Event description ==
The National Orange Show hosts a citrus competition among citrus growers in California, and baking contests of cakes and pies with citrus as an ingredient. Attractions unrelated to the citrus industry, like art shows, games, circuses and "[c]ommercial and [i]ndustrial exhibits", are also hosted; and, since the decline of California's citrus industry, have outnumbered the citrus-related exhibitions. The venue, which is also called the National Orange Show, is used year-round for other festivals and events, like concerts. It has rained "nearly every year" during the National Orange Show. Contrariwise it tends not to rain when the show is cancelled; for example it did not rain or only rained lightly on the days that the Orange Show would have been held during its hiatus from 1942 to 1946. People have, in jest, attributed the tendency of rain to occur on the National Orange Show to the show having been cursed by the Serrano people for "usurping an ancient burial ground".

== History ==
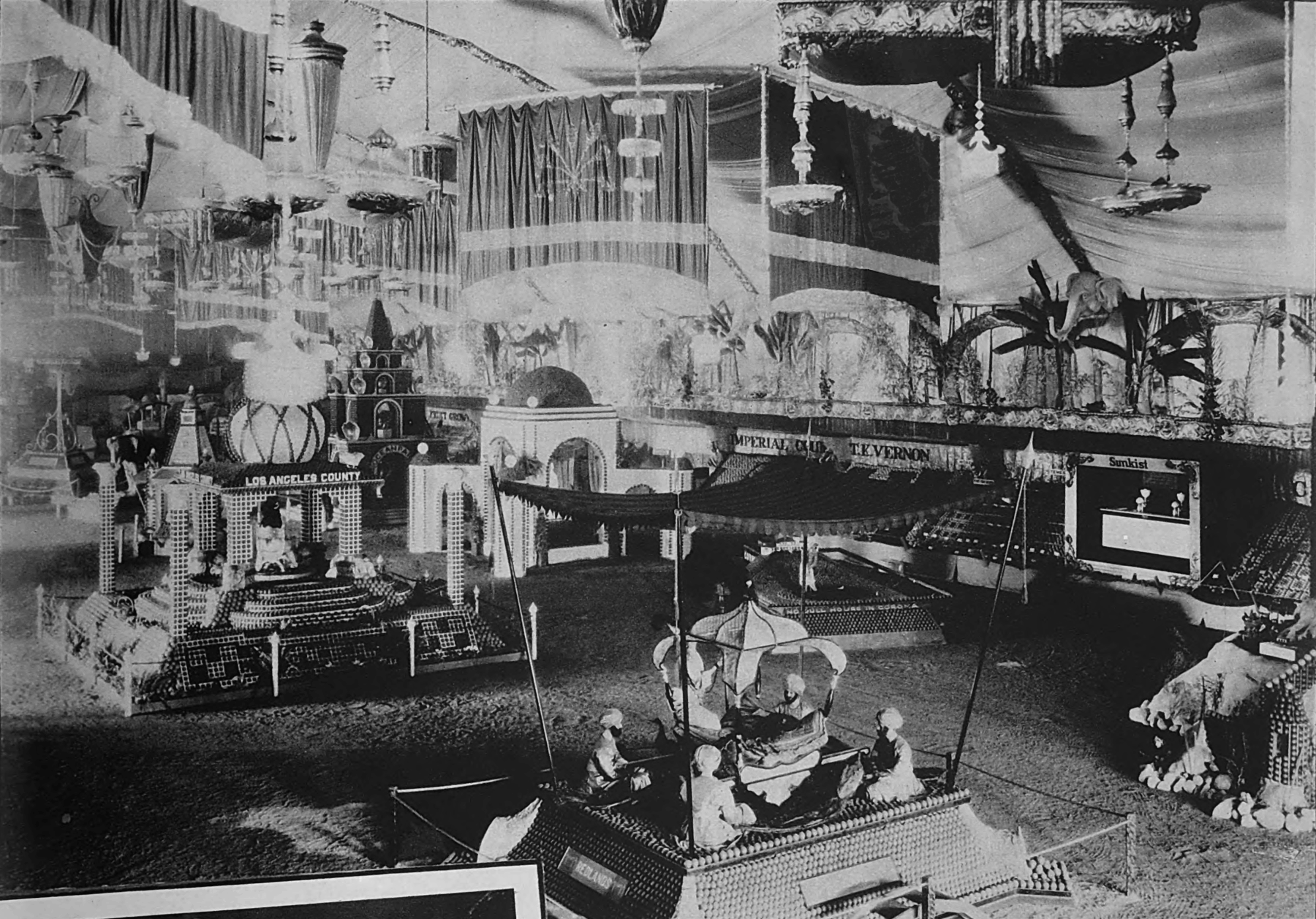
Partial interior view of the National Orange Show c. 1927

Citrus fairs had been hosted in a number of cities in Southern California since 1879, and there had been an "Orange Show" in Colton in 1889. Harry Perkins, who had found his "apple shows" successful and popular, got the idea in 1910 to start a national, annual citrus show based in San Bernardino in order to promote the citrus industry. Members of the Chamber of Commerce agreed with Perkins's idea and created an organisation, the National Orange Show Association, to set it up; W. W. Brison, who was also president of the Chamber of Commerce, was its president and Ralph E. Swing was its general manager.

This iteration of the Orange Show occurred for the first time starting March 6, 1911 in a small tent on the intersection of the downtown 4th and E. Streets, four miles from where the 1889 Orange Show had been held. It rained for four days, downing the tent, but the festivities continued; three thousand people attended, and the fair exhibited a hundred boxes of fruit. Governor Hiram Johnson, and Vice President Charles W. Fairbanks and his son Frederick visited. Were it not for illness, Mayor S. W. McNabb would have been present to introduce the show. The Citrus Institute, which discussed the economic, business and agricultural aspects of citrus cultivation, also convened at the event; it reconvened in 1916 and, up to at least 1990, convened annually. The Orange Show returned as the National Orange Show in 1912, with a better tent.

In 1915 F. M. Renfro, who had been the organization's secretary since the first show, became its manager; he improved the advertising and decorations, which increased the show's popularity. Also in 1915 a department was created to exhibit "citrus byproducts" like jellies, extracts and marmalades at the National Orange Show. In 1919 The California Citrograph claimed the tents used to host the Orange Show were the "largest exposition tents in the West"; the festival was also an opportune place for businessmen to find prospective business partners and employees. The fairgrounds were moved to Rialto Avenue in 1919 and later to Urbita Springs; it was easy for people to travel to the Orange Show because the Pacific Electric line, which served most of Southern California, was now close to the fairgrounds.

The National Orange Show continued to be hosted in tents until 1924, when the organizers purchased a plot of land and had a building, 135 feet wide and 900 feet long, constructed on it; this building was in 1927 the "largest permanent exposition building on the Pacific Coast". Since then the National Orange Show has introduced non-citrus-related entertainment and exhibits, and turned into a "true regional fair". On the south end of the fairgrounds, a stadium was built in 1938 to accommodate the increasing number of people attending the Orange Shows. The fairgrounds were repurposed for storage after Pearl Harbor was bombed in December of 1941; for the next five years, no National Orange Shows were held. After the main building burned down in 1949, the Swing Auditorium was used as the venue until its demolition in 1981 after an airplane crashed into it. The National Orange Show introduced its mascot, Citrus Sam, in 1958; he was named by a fourth-grade student Larry Pottroff. The Orange Show was, throughout the 20th century, frequently visited by celebrities.

The Orange Show's popularity and attendance have declined since the 1990s; it was attended by more than 300,000 at the zenith of its popularity, but in the 2010s it was attended each year by only 35,000 to 70,000. Because the fair had stopped making enough money to finance the typical eleven days, the event runtime was decreased to five days in 1995. To appeal to younger fairgoers who were more familiar with the NOS Events Center, the National Orange Show was renamed in 2017 to the NOS Citrus Fair. Due to the COVID-19 pandemic the Orange Show did not occur in 2020 nor in 2021.

== Works cited ==
- Schuiling, Walter C. (1984). San Bernardino County: Land of Contrasts. Windsor Publications Inc. California.
- Brown, Jr., John; Boyd, James (1922). History of San Bernardino and Riverside County. The Western Historical Association.
- Pictorial California Miscellaneous Issues. Vol. February 1927. Eugene Swarzwald. 1927.
