= 1949 AAFC season =

American football season

AAFC teams: Dissolved at the end of season, Teams to move to NFL

The 1949 AAFC season was the fourth season of the All-America Football Conference. With the league teetering on the brink, seven teams played 12 games each that would see four teams compete in a playoff for the right to play in the AAFC Championship. O. O. Kessing succeeded Jonas Ingram as Commissioner while the New York Yankees and the Brooklyn Dodgers franchises essentially merged. The Chicago Rockets rebranded to Hornets with new ownership. The Cleveland Browns won the fourth and last AAFC championship.

== Draft ==
The league's third and final collegiate draft was held on December 21, 1948. Stan Heath was the first overall selection.

== Season ==
=== 1949 AAFC final standings ===
W = Wins, L = Losses, T = Ties, Pct. = Winning Percentage
PF = Points Scored For, PA = Point Scored Against

AAFC standings
	W	L	T	PCT	PF	PA	STK
Cleveland Browns	9	1	2	.900	339	171	W2
San Francisco 49ers	9	3	0	.750	416	227	W3
New York Yankees	8	4	0	.667	196	206	L1
Buffalo Bills	5	5	2	.500	236	256	W2
Los Angeles Dons	4	8	0	.333	253	322	L1
Chicago Hornets	4	8	0	.333	179	268	L5
Baltimore Colts	1	11	0	.083	172	341	L6

Note: Tie games were not officially counted in the standings.

== Championship game ==
- Semifinal #1: Cleveland 31, Buffalo 21 (December 4 @ Cleveland)
- Semifinal #2: San Francisco 17, Brooklyn/New York 7 (December 4 @ San Francisco)
- AAFC Championship: Cleveland 21, San Francisco 7 (December 11 @ Cleveland)
