= 1949 Cleveland Browns season =

NFL team season

- Owner: Arthur B. McBride
- Head coach: Paul Brown
- Home stadium: Cleveland Stadium

Results
- Record: 9–1–2
- Division place: 1st AAFC
- Playoffs: Won Divisional Playoffs (vs. Bills) 31–21; Won AAFC Championship (vs. 49ers) 21–7
- All-Pros: Otto Graham; Mac Speedie

The 1949 Cleveland Browns season was the team's fourth and final season in the All-America Football Conference (AAFC). The Browns finished the regular season with a 9–1–2 win–loss–tie record and beat the San Francisco 49ers to win their fourth straight league championship. In the season's sixth game on October 9, the 49ers stopped the Browns' professional football record unbeaten streak at 29 games. It began two years earlier on October 19, 1947, and included two league championship games and two ties.

Cleveland made numerous roster moves before the season, adding tackle Derrell Palmer, linebacker Tommy Thompson, and defensive back Warren Lahr, all of whom remained with the team for many years. Prior to the season, it was clear that the AAFC was struggling and might not survive beyond 1949. The regular season was shortened to twelve games and a new playoff system was introduced, with the top four teams competing in a two-week (semifinals, final) postseason.

The Browns began the season with a tie against the Buffalo Bills, but won their next four games. Following their loss to the 49ers in the sixth game of the season, the Browns won all but one of their remaining regular-season games, another tie with the Bills. The team finished atop the AAFC standings and faced the Bills in a league semi-final that they won, 31–21. The Browns then beat the 49ers in the championship game, shortly after AAFC and National Football League (NFL) owners agreed to a deal where the Browns, 49ers, and Baltimore Colts would join the NFL in 1950, and the rest of the AAFC teams would cease to exist.

Browns quarterback Otto Graham, end Mac Speedie, and linebacker Lou Saban were named to sportswriters' All-Pro lists after the season, while head coach Paul Brown was named AAFC coach of the year by Sporting News. Graham led the league in passing for the third time in a row, while Speedie was the league leader in yards and receptions. Fullback Marion Motley was the AAFC's all-time leading rusher. While the Browns were successful in the AAFC, winning all four of its championships, many people doubted that they could match up against NFL teams. Cleveland went on to win the 1950 NFL championship.

== Offseason and roster moves ==
The Browns finished the 1948 season with a perfect record and defeated the Buffalo Bills to win the AAFC championship for the third time in a row. Head coach Paul Brown made several adjustments before the 1949 season, bringing in halfback Les Horvath, a former Los Angeles Rams player from Ohio State who had won the Heisman Trophy in 1944 . He also signed tackle Derrell Palmer and linebacker Tommy Thompson. Palmer came in a trade with the New York Yankees and Thompson, a rookie from William & Mary, helped solidify the team's defense for the next five seasons. Defensive back Warren Lahr, who had signed in 1948 out of Western Reserve but sat out the season with a broken leg, saw his first play in 1949 and was a star in the secondary for eleven years.

Even before the season began, signs had emerged that the AAFC was struggling financially. After suffering from poor attendance in the previous season, the Brooklyn Dodgers dissolved and some of its players joined the cross-town New York Yankees as part of a partial merger. Other AAFC teams were allowed to sign players who did not join the Yankees, and the Browns added tackle Joe Spencer. Team owners agreed to several other changes in an attempt to address the league's difficulties. The regular-season schedule was reduced from 14 to 12 games, and the Eastern and Western divisions were abandoned in favor of a single set of standings, with the top four teams participating in playoffs to determine the league champion. The team with the better regular-season record had home-field advantage in the playoffs, the first time that happened in professional football history.

Paul Brown and other AAFC coaches knew the league was unlikely to survive after the 1949 season. AAFC owners had already discussed merging with the National Football League (NFL) the previous year, and most teams in both leagues were losing money. The talks fell apart, however, when the owners could not agree on which of the AAFC's teams would join the NFL. As the league faltered, Brown entertained but ultimately declined offers to leave the Browns and return to Ohio State University, where he had coached in the early 1940s.

== Roster and coaching staff ==
1949 Cleveland Browns roster
Quarterbacks
- 60 Otto Graham

Running backs

- 99 Bill Boedeker
- 86 Dub Jones
- 90 Edgar Jones
- 76 Marion Motley
- 70 Ed Sustersic

Receivers

- 59 Horace Gillom P/DE
- 56 Dante Lavelli
- 58 Mac Speedie S

Offensive linemen
- 22 Frank Gatski C
- 34 Bob Gaudio G
- 46 Lou Groza T/K
- 32 Lin Houston G
- 44 Lou Rymkus T
- 49 Joe Spencer T/DT
- 36 Ed Ulinski G

Defensive linemen

- 48 Chubby Grigg DT
- 53 Bill O'Connor DE
- 42 Derrell Palmer DT/T
- 30 Bill Willis MG/DT
- 50 John Yonakor DE
- 52 George Young DE

Linebackers
- 74 Tony Adamle OLB/FB
- 35 Alex Agase MLB/MG
- 38 Weldon Humble MLB/G
- 20 Lou Saban OLB/K/C
- 23 Tommy Thompson OLB/C

Defensive backs

* 92 Les Horvath    CB/RB

- 82 Tommy James CB/RB
- 80 Warren Lahr CB/RB/S
- 62 Cliff Lewis S/QB

Reserve lists
- 85 Ara Parseghian RB (IR)

Head Coach

- Paul Brown

Assistants

- Blanton Collier (Backfield)
- Weeb Ewbank (Tackles)
- Dick Gallagher (Ends)
- Fritz Heisler (Guards)

rookies in italics

== Preseason ==
Week	Date	Opponent	Result	Record	Venue	Attendance	Game recap
1	August 14	Chicago Hornets	W 21–0	1–0	Glass Bowl	13,500	Recap
2	August 19	San Francisco 49ers	T 21–21	1–0–1	Cleveland Stadium	31,157	Recap
3	August 26	New York Yankees	W 28–21	2–0–1	Rubber Bowl	19,441	Recap

== Preseason game summaries ==
The Browns held their training camp at Bowling Green State University in Bowling Green, Ohio, as the team had each year since its first season in 1946. Three preseason games were scheduled, against the Chicago Hornets, San Francisco 49ers and New York Yankees.

=== Week 1: vs. Chicago Hornets ===
Team	1	2	3	4	Total
Hornets	0	0	0	0	0
• Browns	7	7	7	0	21

- Date: August 14
- Location: Glass Bowl, Toledo, Ohio
- Game attendance: 13,500 (est.)
- Source: Plain Dealer

Scoring summary
1	CLE	Otto Graham 28-yard rush (Lou Groza kick)	CLE 7–0
2	CLE	Ed Sustersic 2-yard rush (Lou Groza kick)	CLE 14–0
3	CLE	Ed Sustersic 4-yard rush (Lou Groza kick)	CLE 21–0

The Browns began the preseason with a 21–0 win against the Chicago Hornets in Toledo, Ohio. Three plays after Chicago received the opening kickoff, end Dan Edwards fumbled the ball and the Browns recovered. Cleveland then drove to a 28-yard rushing touchdown by quarterback Otto Graham. Ed Sustersic, the Browns' third-string fullback, ran two yards for another touchdown in the second quarter, giving Cleveland a 14–0 lead. Chicago came close to scoring near the end of the first half, driving to Cleveland's two-yard line, but the period ended before the Hornets could score. Sustersic ran for another touchdown in the third quarter, and the Browns' defense held Chicago scoreless for the remainder of the game. Graham passed for 80 yards, mostly on short throws to end Mac Speedie, who finished with four catches for 34 yards. Halfback Dub Jones was the team's leading rusher, with 50 yards on two carries. The defense held Chicago to 122 total yards of passing and rushing, and Browns defensive halfbacks had four interceptions. Warren Lahr accounted for two of the interceptions. Paul Brown pulled Graham toward the end of the game, and Cliff Lewis and Edgar Jones spent time at quarterback.

=== Week 2: vs. San Francisco 49ers ===
Team	1	2	3	4	Total
49ers	7	7	0	7	21
Browns	0	7	14	0	21

- Date: August 19
- Location: Cleveland Stadium, Cleveland, Ohio
- Game attendance: 31,157
- Source: Plain Dealer

Scoring summary
1	SFO	Gail Bruce fumble return (Joe Vetrano kick)	SFO 7–0
2	SFO	Alyn Beals 39-yard pass from Frankie Albert (Joe Vetrano kick)	SFO 14–0
2	CLE	Dub Jones 46-yard pass from Otto Graham (Lou Groza kick)	SFO 14–7
3	CLE	Dante Lavelli 24-yard pass from Otto Graham (Lou Groza kick)	14–14
3	CLE	Ara Parseghian 35-yard rush (Lou Groza kick)	CLE 21–14
4	SFO	Johnny Strzykalski 11-yard pass from Frankie Albert (Joe Vetrano kick)	21–21

The Browns faced the San Francisco 49ers, a perennial rival and one of the top teams in the AAFC, in their second preseason game. The 49ers took the lead seven minutes into the first period when Otto Graham attempted a lateral pass that was deflected by tackle Lou Rymkus and rolled backward into the Browns' own end zone. San Francisco end Gail Bruce fell on the ball and scored a touchdown. The 49ers scored again in the second quarter on a long pass from quarterback Frankie Albert to end Alyn Beals, extending their lead to 14–0. Cleveland came back, however, with a 66-yard drive that included a 46-yard touchdown pass from Graham to Dub Jones. The Browns advanced to the 49ers' 2-yard line in the final minute of the first half, but failed to score because of a fumble recovered by San Francisco. Cleveland scored two touchdowns in the third quarter and took a 21–14 lead; the first was a pass to end Dante Lavelli and the second a 35-yard rush by halfback Ara Parseghian. The score remained that way until the final minute of the fourth quarter, when a touchdown pass from Albert to Johnny Strzykalski tied the game. After the game, Brown said he considered the game a loss and "wasn't at all satisfied" with several players' performances.

=== Week 3: vs. New York Yankees ===
Team	1	2	3	4	Total
Yankees	7	0	7	7	21
• Browns	14	7	0	7	28

- Date: August 26
- Location: Rubber Bowl, Akron, Ohio
- Game attendance: 19,441
- Source: Plain Dealer

Scoring summary
1	CLE	Otto Graham 4-yard rush (Lou Saban kick)	CLE 7–0
1	CLE	Dante Lavelli 20-yard pass from Otto Graham (Lou Saban kick)	CLE 14–0
1	NYY	Dan Garza 36-yard pass from Don Panciera (Harvey Johnson kick)	CLE 14–7
2	CLE	Edgar Jones 4-yard rush (Lou Saban kick)	CLE 21–7
3	NYY	Lowell Tew 50-yard pass from Don Panciera (Harvey Johnson kick)	CLE 21–14
4	CLE	Bill Boedeker 4-yard pass from Otto Graham (Lou Saban kick)	CLE 28–14
4	NYY	Dewey Proctor 8-yard rush (Harvey Johnson kick)	CLE 28–21

The Browns faced the New York Yankees in their third and final preseason game. Cleveland scored a touchdown on its first possession, a 53-yard drive that ended with a four-yard scoring rush by Graham. The Yankees' ensuing drive stalled and they punted back to the Browns. Cleveland's Cliff Lewis returned the kick 74 yards to the Yankees' 20-yard line, setting up a second touchdown on a pass from Graham to Lavelli. New York scored a touchdown on its next possession in the first quarter, a long pass from quarterback Don Panciera to end Dan Garza, narrowing Cleveland's lead to 14–7. The Browns, however, added another touchdown in the second quarter, bringing their lead to 21–7 at halftime. Panciera responded with a 50-yard touchdown pass to Lowell Tew in the third quarter and scored again in the fourth, but a fourth Cleveland touchdown in the final period sealed the 28–21 victory for the Browns. Browns tackle and placekicker Lou Groza sat out the game with a pulled leg muscle, and team captain Lou Saban kicked the team's extra points. Marion Motley, the regular starting fullback, played sparingly because of an injury. Graham and Lewis both played at quarterback and amassed 15 completions for 176 yards. The team's halfbacks and fullbacks gained 191 yards.

== Regular season ==
Game	Date	Opponent	Result	Record	Venue	Attendance	Recap	Sources
1	September 5	at Buffalo Bills	T 28–28	0–0–1	War Memorial Stadium	31,839	Recap	
2	September 11	Baltimore Colts	W 21–0	1–0–1	Cleveland Stadium	21,621	Recap	
3	September 18	New York Yankees	W 14–3	2–0–1	Cleveland Stadium	26,312	Recap	
4	September 25	at Baltimore Colts	W 28–20	3–0–1	Memorial Stadium	36,837	Recap	
5	October 2	Los Angeles Dons	W 42–7	4–0–1	Cleveland Stadium	30,465	Recap	
6	October 9	at San Francisco 49ers	L 28–56	4–1–1	Kezar Stadium	59,720	Recap	
7	October 14	at Los Angeles Dons	W 61–14	5–1–1	Los Angeles Memorial Coliseum	27,427	Recap	
8	October 30	San Francisco 49ers	W 30–28	6–1–1	Cleveland Stadium	72,189	Recap	
9	November 6	Chicago Hornets	W 35–2	7–1–1	Cleveland Stadium	16,506	Recap	
10	November 13	Buffalo Bills	T 7–7	7–1–2	Cleveland Stadium	22,511	Recap	
11	November 20	at New York Yankees	W 31–0	8–1–2	Yankee Stadium	50,711	Recap	
12	November 24	at Chicago Hornets	W 14–6	9–1–2	Soldier Field	5,031	Recap	

== Game summaries ==
=== Week 1: vs. Buffalo Bills ===
Team	1	2	3	4	Total
Browns	7	0	0	21	28
Bills	0	7	21	0	28

- Date: September 5
- Location: War Memorial Stadium, Buffalo, New York
- Game attendance: 31,839
- Source: Pro Football Reference

Scoring summary
1	CLE	Edgar Jones 12-yard pass from Otto Graham (Lou Saban kick)	CLE 7–0
2	BUF	Ollie Cline 6-yard rush (Chet Adams kick)	7–7
3	BUF	George Ratterman 2-yard rush (Chet Adams kick)	BUF 14–7
3	BUF	George Ratterman 1-yard rush (Chet Adams kick)	BUF 21–7
3	BUF	Chet Mutryn 2-yard rush (Chet Adams kick)	BUF 28–7
4	CLE	Edgar Jones 7-yard pass from Otto Graham (Lou Saban kick)	BUF 28–14
4	CLE	Edgar Jones 38-yard pass from Otto Graham (Lou Saban kick)	BUF 28–21
4	CLE	Mac Speedie 2-yard pass from Otto Graham (Lou Saban kick)	28–28

The Browns began the regular season by tying the Buffalo Bills, the team they had beaten to win the 1948 AAFC championship. Cleveland began the scoring in the first quarter with a touchdown pass from Graham to Edgar Jones, but Buffalo tied the score in the second quarter with a touchdown of its own on a rush by Ollie Cline. The Bills then added three touchdowns in the third quarter, two of them on short rushes by quarterback George Ratterman. Down 28–7 entering the fourth quarter, the Browns managed three touchdowns in the period to even the score. The first two were passes from Graham to Jones, while the third was a short pass from Graham to Mac Speedie with less than two minutes left in the game to tie the score at 28 points each. Groza, who suffered a pulled leg muscle in the preseason, continued to sit out, and Saban handled the Browns' kicking duties. Graham struggled with his passing early in the game, and Cleveland fumbled numerous times. Punter Horace Gillom fumbled a snap, and halfback Bill Boedeker had two fumbles early in the third quarter. Graham ended the game with 27 completions in 40 attempts for 330 yards, most of them during the fourth quarter. The tie ended a winning streak that extended through the 1948 season, when the Browns won all of their games. The team, however, preserved its streak of 25 games without a loss.

=== Week 2: vs. Baltimore Colts ===
Team	1	2	3	4	Total
Colts	0	0	0	0	0
• Browns	7	0	14	0	21

- Date: September 11
- Location: Cleveland Stadium
- Game attendance: 21,621
- Source: Pro Football Reference

Scoring summary
1	CLE	Edgar Jones 3-yard rush (Lou Saban kick)	CLE 7–0
3	CLE	Dante Lavelli 24-yard pass from Otto Graham (Lou Saban kick)	CLE 14–0
3	CLE	Edgar Jones 7-yard rush (Lou Saban kick)	CLE 21–0

The Browns won their second game of the season, a shutout victory over the Baltimore Colts in Cleveland. An interception by Warren Lahr set up Cleveland's first score, a short touchdown run by Edgar Jones. A 70-yard drive on five plays at the beginning of the third quarter was capped by a touchdown throw from Graham to end Dante Lavelli to give the Browns a 14–0 lead. The team's third and final touchdown came later in the third quarter on an 81-yard drive. The shutout was the Browns' first since 1947 and extended a long unbeaten streak, but Cleveland suffered a rash of injuries. Groza remained out with a leg injury, while defensive end George Young sustained a serious cheekbone injury when he was trying to tackle Baltimore quarterback Y. A. Tittle at the end of the second quarter. His cheekbone was broken and caved in, and he was taken to a Cleveland hospital for plastic surgery. Marion Motley suffered a rib injury, Edgar Jones hurt his thigh, and Bill Boedeker had a knee injury, although all three were expected to play in the following week's game against the New York Yankees. Despite that the Colts game was the Browns' home opener, only 21,621 were in attendance, the smallest home crowd in the club's four-year history.

=== Week 3: vs. New York Yankees ===
Team	1	2	3	4	Total
Yankees	3	0	0	0	3
• Browns	7	0	0	7	14

- Date: September 18
- Location: Cleveland Stadium
- Game attendance: 26,312
- Source: Pro Football Reference

Scoring summary
1	NYY	Harvey Johnson 25-yard field goal	NYY 3–0
1	CLE	Les Horvath 84-yard fumble return (Lou Saban kick)	CLE 7–3
4	CLE	Tommy James 27-yard interception return (Lou Saban kick)	CLE 14–3

The Browns faced the New York Yankees in the third game of the regular season on a rainy afternoon in Cleveland. The Yankees scored first on a field goal by Harvey Johnson in the first quarter. Cleveland's offense struggled throughout the game, maintaining possession for just 40 plays and amassing only 125 yards of total offense. Graham completed just four passes. While the offense faltered, however, the Browns' defense stopped the Yankees from scoring numerous times despite allowing a series of long drives. The Browns stopped the Yankees from scoring on six drives that went inside the Browns' 20-yard line and three of them that went inside the 10-yard line. New York had 311 total yards, but Cleveland won the game 14–3 on a pair of touchdowns scored by its defense. Les Horvath took a fumble by Buddy Young 84 yards for a touchdown in the first quarter, and Tommy James intercepted Yankees quarterback Don Panciera with two seconds left in the game, running the ball in for a 27-yard touchdown. Lou Saban again handled kicking duties, booting through both extra points after the touchdowns as Lou Groza remained sidelined with his leg injury.

=== Week 4: vs. Baltimore Colts ===
Team	1	2	3	4	Total
• Browns	0	0	7	21	28
Colts	0	13	0	7	20

- Date: September 25
- Location: Memorial Stadium, Baltimore
- Game attendance: 36,837
- Source: Pro Football Reference

Scoring summary
2	BAL	Windell Williams 7-yard pass from Y. A. Tittle (Rex Grossman kick)	BAL 7–0
2	BAL	Rex Grossman 33-yard field goal	BAL 10–0
2	BAL	Rex Grossman 38-yard field goal	BAL 13–0
3	CLE	Edgar Jones 17-yard rush (Lou Groza kick)	BAL 13–7
4	CLE	Otto Graham 6-yard rush (Lou Groza kick)	CLE 14–13
4	CLE	Marion Motley 2-yard rush (Lou Groza kick)	CLE 21–13
4	BAL	Billy Stone 47-yard pass from Y. A. Tittle (Rex Grossman kick)	CLE 21–20
4	CLE	Edgar Jones 8-yard rush (Lou Groza kick)	28–20

Cleveland beat the Baltimore Colts in the fourth game of the season. Baltimore scored a touchdown and a pair of field goals in the second quarter to get out to a 13–0 halftime lead, but Cleveland launched a comeback in the third and fourth quarters. The Browns' scoring began in the third quarter with a 17-yard touchdown run by Edgar Jones that was set up by a 47-yard return of a Colts missed field goal by Cliff Lewis. Cleveland then took a 14–13 lead when a fourth-quarter punt by Charlie O'Rourke slipped off his foot and went sideways, going out of bounds at his own 22-yard line. The Browns took over and Graham scored a touchdown on a six-yard rush. Another touchdown followed about a minute later when linebacker Bill Willis intercepted Colts quarterback Y. A. Tittle and returned it to Baltimore's 2-yard line. Marion Motley ran it in for a touchdown from there. Baltimore responded with a long touchdown pass from Tittle to Billy Stone, but Cleveland sealed the 28–20 victory with an eight-yard rush by Edgar Jones. Cleveland trailed Baltimore in total yards, with 104 yards of passing and 107 yards of rushing against Baltimore's 181 passing yards and 140 rushing yards. Groza handled kicking for the first time in the season after recovering from his injury.

=== Week 5: vs. Los Angeles Dons ===
Team	1	2	3	4	Total
Dons	0	0	0	7	7
• Browns	0	14	14	14	42

- Date: October 2
- Location: Cleveland Stadium
- Game attendance: 30,465
- Source: Pro Football Reference

Scoring summary
2	CLE	Bill Boedeker 74-yard pass from Otto Graham (Lou Groza kick)	CLE 7–0
2	CLE	Marion Motley 2-yard rush (Lou Groza kick)	CLE 14–0
3	CLE	Lou Saban 20-yard interception return (Lou Groza kick)	CLE 21–0
3	CLE	Marion Motley 33-yard rush (Lou Groza kick)	CLE 28–0
4	CLE	Mac Speedie 3-yard pass from Otto Graham (Lou Groza kick)	CLE 35–0
4	LAD	John Brown fumble return (Robert Nelson kick)	CLE 35–7
4	CLE	Ed Sustersic 39-yard rush (Lou Groza kick)	CLE 42–7

The Browns beat the Los Angeles Dons by a 35-point margin in their fifth game. The team's offense had its best game of the year, scoring six touchdowns. Two of them were on trap runs by Marion Motley, who returned from a series of injuries and ended the game with 139 yards of rushing, the second-highest total of his career. Graham passed for 279 yards and two touchdowns, one to Bill Boedeker in the second quarter and the other to Mac Speedie in the fourth quarter. The team's 550 yards of total offense was the second-highest total in club history. Lou Saban also scored a touchdown on an interception return in the third quarter. The Dons' lone score came on an 84-yard drive in the fourth quarter engineered by quarterback Glenn Dobbs, who had replaced regular quarterback George Taliaferro after he suffered a knee ligament injury. The game was Cleveland's 29th in a row without a defeat, stretching to the 1947 season. Coach Paul Brown said after the game that the team played "like a baseball pitcher having a good day" in the 42–7 win.

=== Week 6: vs. San Francisco 49ers ===
Team	1	2	3	4	Total
Browns	7	14	0	7	28
• 49ers	21	14	7	14	56

- Date: October 9
- Location: Kezar Stadium, San Francisco
- Game attendance: 59,720
- Source: Pro Football Reference

Scoring summary
1	SFO	Johnny Strzykalski 16-yard pass from Frankie Albert (Joe Vetrano kick)	SFO 7–0
1	SFO	Johnny Strzykalski 1-yard rush (Joe Vetrano kick)	SFO 14–0
1	SFO	Joe Perry 27-yard pass from Frankie Albert (Joe Vetrano kick)	SFO 21–0
1	CLE	Mac Speedie 39-yard pass from Otto Graham (Lou Groza kick)	SFO 21–7
2	CLE	Dante Lavelli 25-yard pass from Otto Graham (Groza kick)	SFO 21–14
2	SFO	Alyn Beals 15-yard pass from Frankie Albert (Vetrano kick)	SFO 28–14
2	CLE	Mac Speedie 13-yard pass from Otto Graham (Groza kick)	SFO 28–21
2	SFO	Nick Susoeff 8-yard pass from Frankie Albert (Vetrano kick)	SFO 35–21
3	SFO	Eddie Carr 24-yard pass from Frankie Albert (Joe Vetrano kick)	SFO 42–21
4	CLE	Marion Motley 12-yard rush (Lou Groza kick)	SFO 42–28
4	SFO	Joe Perry 49-yard rush (Joe Vetrano kick)	SFO 49–28
4	SFO	Eddie Carr 5-yard rush (Joe Vetrano kick)	56–28

The Browns suffered their first loss in 29 games on October 9 against the San Francisco 49ers at Kezar Stadium. The 49ers were one of the strongest teams in the AAFC, and held a 4–1 win–loss record coming into the game. They had scored an average of almost 35 points a game in their first five weeks, led by an offensive attack that featured quarterback Frankie Albert, fullback Joe Perry and end Alyn Beals. The Browns had been effective on defense against San Francisco in their previous four match-ups, allowing a maximum of 14 points. This time, however, the 49ers dominated the Browns, scoring eight touchdowns and 56 total points. San Francisco led from the outset, scoring three unanswered touchdowns in the first quarter. The Browns scored three touchdowns in the first half on two passes from Graham to Speedie and one from Graham to Lavelli, but Albert threw two more of his own before the half to maintain a 35–21 lead. The 49ers scored three more touchdowns in the second half to seal the blowout victory. Perry had an especially strong game, rushing for 156 yards on 16 carries and scoring two touchdowns. Aided by Albert's four passing touchdowns and 249 passing yards, the 49ers had 511 total offensive yards in the game. Paul Brown was disappointed with his team's play and told his players he would cut anyone who did not raise his standard of play. The defeat put San Francisco into first place in the AAFC standings ahead of the Browns.

=== Week 7: vs. Los Angeles Dons ===
Team	1	2	3	4	Total
• Browns	14	20	14	13	61
Dons	7	0	0	7	14

- Date: October 14
- Location: Los Angeles Memorial Coliseum
- Game attendance: 27,427
- Source: Pro Football Reference

Scoring summary
1	CLE	Dante Lavelli 46-yard pass from Otto Graham (Lou Groza kick)	CLE 7–0
1	LAD	Hosea Rodgers 2-yard rush (Robert Nelson kick)	7–7
1	CLE	Dub Jones 42-yard pass from Otto Graham (Lou Groza kick)	CLE 14–7
2	CLE	Dante Lavelli 31-yard pass from Otto Graham (Lou Groza kick)	CLE 21–7
2	CLE	Dante Lavelli 67-yard pass from Otto Graham (Lou Groza kick)	CLE 28–7
2	CLE	Dante Lavelli 2-yard pass from Otto Graham (kick failed)	CLE 34–7
3	CLE	Mac Speedie 12-yard pass from Otto Graham (Lou Groza kick)	CLE 41–7
3	CLE	Mac Speedie 27-yard pass from Cliff Lewis (Lou Groza kick)	CLE 48–7
4	LAD	George Taliaferro 9-yard rush (Robert Nelson kick)	CLE 48–14
4	CLE	Warren Lahr 2-yard rush (kick failed)	CLE 54–14
4	CLE	Cliff Lewis 2-yard rush (Lou Groza kick)	CLE 61–14

Cleveland came back after its first loss in 29 games to set beat the Los Angeles Dons in a blowout as Graham set an AAFC single-game touchdown record. Graham threw six touchdowns, including four to Lavelli and two to Speedie, beating the old record of five. Lavelli's 209 receiving yards were also a league record, and his four scores tied a professional football record set by Don Hutson. The Browns had 423 passing yards in the game. The game started with an 80-yard drive by the Browns that ended with one of Graham's touchdown passes to Lavelli. The Dons then tied the game with a touchdown of their own after an 11-play drive. From there, however, the Browns pulled away with six unanswered touchdowns, including three to Lavelli in the second quarter alone. The Dons scored once in the fourth quarter on a rush by Taliaferro, but Cleveland added two more touchdowns in the period to pull out to a 61–14 victory. While the blowout was a welcome reprieve after the loss to San Francisco, the Browns lost halfback Edgar Jones to a broken collarbone. Jones, who had been productive early in the season, was forced to sit out the rest of the regular season, returning for the playoffs. A week after the game, when the Browns had a bye, the Yankees beat the 49ers, propelling the Browns back into first place in the AAFC standings. The win gave the Yankees a 5–1 record and a tie for first place with Cleveland ahead of the 49ers, who were 6–2.

=== Week 8: vs. San Francisco 49ers ===
Team	1	2	3	4	Total
49ers	0	14	0	14	28
• Browns	0	14	7	9	30

- Date: October 30
- Location: Cleveland Stadium
- Game attendance: 72,189
- Source: Pro Football Reference

Scoring summary
2	SFO	Len Eshmont 48-yard pass from Frankie Albert (Joe Vetrano kick)	SFO 7–0
2	CLE	Dante Lavelli 9-yard pass from Otto Graham (Lou Groza kick)	7–7
2	SFO	Verl Lillywhite 8-yard rush (Joe Vetrano kick)	SFO 14–7
2	CLE	Dub Jones 6-yard rush (Lou Groza kick)	14–14
3	CLE	Otto Graham 20-yard rush (Lou Groza kick)	CLE 21–14
4	SFO	Alyn Beals 22-yard pass from Frankie Albert (Joe Vetrano kick)	21–21
4	CLE	Lou Groza 38-yard field goal	CLE 24–21
4	CLE	Mac Speedie 12-yard pass from Otto Graham (kick failed)	CLE 30–21
4	SFO	Frankie Albert 1-yard rush (Joe Vetrano kick)	CLE 30–28

The Browns avenged their blowout loss to the 49ers with a win in Cleveland on October 30. The matchup drew a crowd of 72,189, the largest attendance for a game in all of pro football in 1949. The 49ers began the scoring in the second quarter with a 48-yard pass from Albert to Len Eshmont. The Browns responded with a touchdown by Lavelli, but the 49ers went ahead again later in the second quarter with a touchdown run by Verl Lillywhite. From there, however, Cleveland scored two touchdowns and Groza kicked a field goal, giving Cleveland a lead it held through the fourth quarter despite two touchdowns by Albert, one of them on a pass to Beals and the other a rush. The Browns won the game 30–28. Groza missed an extra point after a fourth-quarter touchdown because of a high snap, but his field goal proved to be the difference in the close game. The Browns had success in part by exploiting a tendency Brown noticed in their previous game where 49ers defenders would "loop" to one side or the other of the Browns' offensive linemen before making their charge at the quarterback. Brown called a number of quarterback runs, which proved effective against this strategy; Graham was Cleveland's leading rusher, with eight runs for 43 yards. Lavelli suffered a sprained right knee after being tackled by safety Jim Cason, and Graham hurt his shoulder in the game. 49ers coach Buck Shaw used a novel play-calling strategy during the game, relaying offensive sequences to Albert by writing them down on note paper and having substitutes give them to him.

=== Week 9: vs. Chicago Hornets ===
Team	1	2	3	4	Total
Hornets	0	0	0	2	2
• Browns	7	7	7	14	35

- Date: November 6
- Location: Cleveland Stadium
- Game attendance: 16,506
- Source: Pro Football Reference

Scoring summary
1	CLE	Dub Jones 4-yard rush (Lou Groza kick)	CLE 7–0
2	CLE	Les Horvath 2-yard rush (Lou Groza kick)	CLE 14–0
3	CLE	Marion Motley 49-yard rush (Lou Groza kick)	CLE 21–0
4	CHH	Horace Gillom punt blocked, safety	CLE 21–2
4	CLE	Marion Motley 3-yard rush (Lou Saban kick)	CLE 28–2
4	CLE	Les Horvath 55-yard pass from Cliff Lewis (Lou Saban kick)	CLE 35–2

The Browns beat the Chicago Hornets in Cleveland in the ninth game of the season. A field goal attempt in the first quarter by Groza was blocked, but the Browns scored their first points soon thereafter, a four-yard touchdown run by Dub Jones that capped a 49-yard drive. Les Horvath, who had played as a defensive halfback earlier in the season, spent time on offense because of injuries to the Browns' other halfbacks. He scored two touchdowns, the first a two-yard rush in the second quarter and the second a long pass from Cliff Lewis, who substituted for Graham at the end of the game. Motley also scored a pair of touchdowns in the game, and the Browns won 35–2. The Hornets' only points came in the fourth quarter on a safety after a blocked punt by Gillom. Motley accounted for 118 the Browns' 296 rushing yards. The team also had 246 passing yards. Cleveland's defense played well, holding the Hornets' offense scoreless and allowing them beyond the 50-yard line just three times. Groza was ejected from the game in the third quarter for getting into a scuffle with Hornets tackle Nate Johnson.

=== Week 10: vs. Buffalo Bills ===
Team	1	2	3	4	Total
Bills	0	7	0	0	7
Browns	7	0	0	0	7

- Date: November 13
- Location: Cleveland Stadium
- Game attendance: 22,511
- Source: Pro Football Reference

Scoring summary
1	CLE	Otto Graham 1-yard rush (Lou Groza kick)	CLE 7–0
2	BUF	Chet Mutryn 4-yard rush (Chet Adams kick)	7–7

Cleveland tied the Bills for the second time in the tenth game of the season. Browns linebacker Tony Adamle intercepted a pass by Buffalo quarterback George Ratterman on the Bills' first drive. Cleveland recovered on the Bills' 24-yard line, and engineered a short drive that ended with a quarterback sneak by Graham for a touchdown. Warren Lahr intercepted Ratterman again on the Bills' next drive, but Buffalo evened the score in the second quarter following a series of punts. Buffalo's Tommy Colella punted to Cliff Lewis, who signaled for a fair catch, but the ball slipped through his hands and the Bills recovered. Taking over on Cleveland's 44-yard line, the Bills engineered an 11-play drive that ended with a four-yard touchdown rush by Chet Mutryn, tying the score at 7–7. Cleveland twice came close to a touchdown later in the game but failed to score. Both teams missed field goals as rainstorms intensified and passing became difficult in the third and fourth quarters; Groza's missed field goal came in the final 15 seconds of the game and would have won it for Cleveland. Despite the tie, the Browns remained in first place in the AAFC standings. The result also strengthened the Bills' chances of getting the fourth and final spot in the playoffs.

=== Week 11: vs. New York Yankees ===
Team	1	2	3	4	Total
• Browns	17	14	0	0	31
Yankees	0	0	0	0	0

- Date: November 20
- Location: Yankee Stadium
- Game attendance: 50,711
- Source: Pro Football Reference

Scoring summary
1	CLE	Bill Boedeker 23-yard pass from Otto Graham (Lou Groza kick)	CLE 7–0
1	CLE	Dub Jones 1-yard rush (Lou Groza kick)	CLE 14–0
1	CLE	Lou Groza 30-yard field goal	CLE 17–0
2	CLE	Dub Jones 1-yard rush (Lou Groza kick)	CLE 24–0
2	CLE	Marion Motley 1-yard rush (Lou Groza kick)	CLE 31–0

Cleveland beat the Yankees in its second shutout of the season. The Browns scored all of their points in the first half. The first score was a touchdown from Graham to Bill Boedeker. Dub Jones ran for two one-yard touchdowns, while Motley scored on a short rush in the second quarter. Groza also had a field goal at the end of the first quarter as the Browns built a 31–0 lead that it sustained through the third and fourth quarters. The Yankees threatened to score on their first drive of the third quarter, reaching the Browns' one-yard line. New York, however, failed to score and turned the ball over on downs. The Yankees again reached the one-yard line later in the game, but were stopped by a Cleveland interception. Graham threw for 382 yards in the game. Speedie, meanwhile, set AAFC records with 11 receptions and 228 receiving yards. The yardage figure surpassed the mark set by Lavelli against the Dons and remains a Browns team record. The victory clinched first place for the Browns in the regular season AAFC standings and gave them home-field advantage throughout the playoffs. The 49ers and Yankees were in a battle for the second and third playoff spots, while the fourth berth was still up for grabs. A crowd of 50,711 came to see the Browns and the Yankees play in Yankee Stadium, the largest home attendance total of the year for New York.

=== Week 12: vs. Chicago Hornets ===
Team	1	2	3	4	Total
• Browns	14	0	0	0	14
Hornets	0	6	0	0	6

- Date: November 24
- Location: Soldier Field
- Game attendance: 5,031
- Source: Pro Football Reference

Scoring summary
1	CLE	Bill Boedeker 6-yard rush (Lou Groza kick)	CLE 7–0
1	CLE	Marion Motley 6-yard rush (Lou Groza kick)	CLE 14–0
2	CHH	Johnny Clement 1-yard rush (kick failed)	CLE 14–6

The Browns won their final regular-season game against the Hornets at Soldier Field in Chicago. Boedeker scored Cleveland's first touchdown on the third play of the game, a rush from six yards out following a Chicago fumble. Motley scored another touchdown eight minutes later at the end of a 63-yard drive. A fumble by Warren Lahr led to a Hornets touchdown in the second quarter, although kicker Jim McCarthy missed the extra point. Chicago threatened to score again in the fourth quarter after a fumble by Cliff Lewis, reaching the Cleveland three-yard line. Linebackers Bill Willis and Alex Agase tackled Hornets quarterback Johnny Clement for losses, however, stopping the drive. Cleveland won the game 14–6 as snowy conditions slowed the game. The players helped clear snow from the field in the morning before the game began, but the turf was muddy and slippery. Graham had 88 passing yards, bringing his season total to 2,785. It was the highest mark of his career despite that the season was only 12 games long, two shorter than in previous years. A crowd of only 5,031 people attended the game, largely because of the bad weather. The AAFC's Chicago franchise, however, was also one of its least successful financially, competing with the NFL's Chicago Bears and Chicago Cardinals.

== Final standings ==
AAFC standings
	W	L	T	PCT	PF	PA	STK
Cleveland Browns	9	1	2	.900	339	171	W2
San Francisco 49ers	9	3	0	.750	416	227	W3
New York Yankees	8	4	0	.667	196	206	L1
Buffalo Bills	5	5	2	.500	236	256	W2
Los Angeles Dons	4	8	0	.333	253	322	L1
Chicago Hornets	4	8	0	.333	179	268	L5
Baltimore Colts	1	11	0	.083	172	341	L6

Note: Tie games were not officially counted in the standings.

== AAFC playoffs ==
The AAFC instituted a Shaughnessy playoff system for the 1949 season after the Brooklyn Dodgers went out of business, reducing the number of teams in the league to seven. Under the system, the top four teams in the league reached the playoffs; the first-and fourth-place teams played each other for one spot in the championship game, while the second- and third-place teams played for the other championship game berth. Finishing atop the AAFC standings in the regular season, the Browns faced the fourth-place Bills in the semi-final, a team they had tied twice during the regular season.

=== Semi-final vs. Buffalo Bills ===
Team	1	2	3	4	Total
Bills	0	14	7	0	21
• Browns	10	0	14	7	31

- Date: December 4
- Location: Cleveland Stadium
- Game attendance: 17,270
- Source: Pro Football Reference

Scoring summary
1	CLE	Dante Lavelli 51-yard pass from Otto Graham (Lou Groza kick)	CLE 7–0
1	CLE	Lou Groza 31-yard field goal	CLE 10–0
2	BUF	Lou Tomasetti 4-yard pass from George Ratterman (Chet Adams kick)	CLE 10–7
2	BUF	Chet Mutryn 8-yard pass from George Ratterman (Chet Adams kick)	BUF 14–10
3	CLE	Edgar Jones 2-yard rush (Lou Groza kick)	CLE 17–14
3	BUF	Chet Mutryn 30-yard pass from George Ratterman (Chet Adams kick)	BUF 21–17
3	CLE	Dub Jones 49-yard pass from Otto Graham (Lou Groza kick)	CLE 24–21
4	CLE	Warren Lahr 52-yard interception return (Lou Groza kick)	CLE 31–21

Cleveland began its first postseason game against the Bills with two scoring drives in the first quarter, one ending with a 51-yard touchdown pass from Graham to Lavelli and the other with a 31-yard field goal by Groza. The Bills, however, came back in the second quarter with a pair of touchdown throws by quarterback George Ratterman to take a 14–10 lead at halftime. The first score was set up by an interception of a Graham pass by Bob Livingston on the last play of the first quarter, while the second one came on a long drive at the end of the first half that was extended by a roughing the kicker penalty against the Browns. The Browns regained the lead in the third quarter after Lou Saban intercepted Ratterman and returned the ball to the Bills' two-yard line. Edgar Jones ran it in for a touchdown from there. An 80-yard Bills drive gave Buffalo a 21–17 lead toward the end of the third quarter, but Cleveland again went ahead 24–21 on a three-play touchdown drive capped by a 49-pass from Graham to Dub Jones. After missing a field goal in the fourth quarter, Buffalo looked to at least even the score on a drive five minutes left in the game. The Bills were near midfield when Ratterman threw an interception to Warren Lahr that he returned 52 yards for the game-winning touchdown. Graham had 326 passing yards in the game, while Ratterman had 293.

As the Browns beat the Bills, the 49ers beat the Yankees in San Francisco by a score of 17–7. That set up a championship game matchup between Cleveland and San Francisco in Cleveland. In the week before the game, AAFC and NFL owners agreed to terms under which the Browns, 49ers and Colts would play in the NFL starting in the 1950, while the AAFC's other clubs would go out of business. Owners of disbanded teams got minority stakes in NFL clubs, while the 1950 AAFC dispersal draft would allocate AAFC players to active teams in the newly organized league to be called the National American Football League. The owners had floated a similar proposal in 1948, but it had been vetoed by George Preston Marshall, the owner of the NFL's Washington Redskins, and Tim Mara, the owner of the New York Giants. Teams in both leagues were suffering financially, in part because of the competition between them for talent that was driving up player salaries and eating into owners' profits. Paul Brown criticized the deal the owners eventually agreed upon, preferring a unified two-league setup like the one in Major League Baseball.

=== Championship vs. San Francisco 49ers ===
Team	1	2	3	4	Total
49ers	0	0	0	7	7
• Browns	7	0	7	7	21

- Date: December 11
- Location: Cleveland Stadium
- Game attendance: 22,550
- Source: Pro Football Reference

Scoring summary
1	CLE	Edgar Jones 2-yard rush (Lou Groza kick)	CLE 7–0
3	CLE	Marion Motley 68-yard rush (Lou Groza kick)	CLE 14–0
4	SFO	Paul Salata 23-yard pass from Frankie Albert (Joe Vetrano kick)	CLE 14–7
4	CLE	Dub Jones 4-yard rush (Lou Groza kick)	CLE 21–7

News that the AAFC would be disbanded after the 1949 season dampened attendance at the championship game, which Cleveland won 21–7. The Browns scored their first touchdown early in the first quarter on a short rush by Edgar Jones. Cleveland's offense sputtered in the second quarter, however, never advancing beyond their own 38-yard line, and the score remained 7–0 at halftime. A 68-yard rush by Motley for a touchdown gave the Browns a 14–0 lead in the third quarter despite slippery conditions that limited passing and made running difficult. The 49ers came back in the fourth quarter with a 73-yard touchdown drive that ended with throw by Albert to Paul Salata for the score. Cleveland then scored again after the next kickoff, however, an 11-play drive capped by a Dub Jones touchdown with six minutes left that turned out to be the last in the AAFC's four-season history. Cleveland's defense had a strong game, limiting the 49ers to just 122 rushing yards and 108 passing yards. Warren Lahr batted down a pass from Albert to Salata in the third quarter that would have been a touchdown if he had caught it. Graham threw for 128 yards in the game and rushed for 62 yards. The win gave the Browns the AAFC championship for the fourth time in the league's four years of existence.

The Browns played a final game in the 1949 season, matching up against a team of AAFC all-stars a week after the championship game in Houston, Texas. The Shamrock Bowl was organized by Glen McCarthy, a Texas oil executive who wanted to bring a football team to Houston. While a Houston-based AAFC team was no longer possible with the league's demise, McCarthy hoped that a well-attended game would convince NFL owners of the viability of a franchise for the city. The game, however, was poorly attended – only about 10,000 people came. It was also marred by racism: it was initially unclear whether the Browns' black players, Motley, Willis and Gillom, would be allowed to play. McCarthy ultimately relented on the issue, but black players were forced to stay at a different hotel from the white players. Cleveland lost the game to the all-stars by a score of 12–7.

== Season leaders and postseason ==
Graham passed for the most yards in the AAFC for the third time running in 1949. Speedie also won the league receiving crown, registering the most catches and the most receiving yards. His 1,028 yards of receiving put him over the 1,000-yard mark for the second time in his career, the first time a professional football player accomplished that feat. Graham, Speedie and Saban were all named to sportswriters' first-team all-AAFC squads. Motley and Lou Rymkus were also named to first- and second-team all-AAFC lists. Lavelli and Bill Willis were consensus second-team all-AAFC. The Associated Press and the International News Service both selected All-Pro teams that combined players from the AAFC and NFL. Graham, Speedie, Rymkus and Saban were included on the INS list, while Graham and Speedie made the AP list. Paul Brown was chosen as the AAFC's coach of the year by Sporting News.

As the AAFC disbanded after the 1949 season, many Browns players were all-time league leaders at their positions. Motley led in rushing yards, Graham led in passing yards, Groza had the most field goals and Speedie led in receptions and receiving yards. Several players retired after the season, including Saban, who left to start a coaching career, and guard Bob Gaudio, who had been with the team since 1947. Edgar Jones, who had been a mainstay of the Browns' offense in its first four years, also retired after the season because of the shoulder injury he suffered during the season. Another departure was Ara Parseghian, a halfback who suffered a career-ending hip injury.

Despite the Browns' success in their AAFC years, many owners and sportswriters thought the team was not as good as its NFL counterparts as it prepared to play in the league in the 1950 season. Redskins owner George Preston Marshall was especially dismissive of the Browns, saying the NFL's "weakest team could toy with the Browns." Greasy Neale, the head coach of the NFL champion Philadelphia Eagles, also did not take the Browns seriously and decided not to scout the team when the Eagles were scheduled to open the 1950 season against Cleveland. The Browns went on to beat the Eagles in Philadelphia and win the NFL championship in 1950.
