= Bob Pfohl =

American football player (1926–1996)

- Pfohl, 1948

No. 85
- Position: Back

Personal information
- Born: May 21, 1926; Vincennes, Indiana, U.S.
- Died: May 11, 1996 (aged 69); Lafayette, Indiana, U.S.
- Listed height: 6 ft 0 in (1.83 m)
- Listed weight: 200 lb (91 kg)

Career information
- High school: Goshen (IN)
- College: Purdue (1944, 1946); United States Merchant Marine Academy (1945)
- NFL draft: 1948: 7th round, 46th overall pick

Career history
- Baltimore Colts (1948-1949)

Career AAFC statistics
- Rushing yards: 660
- Rushing average: 3.8
- Receptions: 20
- Receiving yards: 196
- Total touchdowns: 8
- Stats at Pro Football Reference

Robert Stormont Anderson "Stormy" Pfohl (May 21, 1926 – May 11, 1996) was an American football player who played at the back position.

A native of Vincennes, Indiana, he attended Goshen High School and later played college football for the United States Merchant Marine Academy and the Purdue Boilermakers.

He was selected by the New York Giants in the seventh round (46th overall pick) of the 1948 NFL draft. He opted instead to play in the All-America Football Conference (AAFC) for the Baltimore Colts during the 1948 and 1949 seasons. He appeared in a total of 26 AAFC games, 21 as a starter. In one of his first professional games, he scored three touchdowns, including a 92-yard punt return.

After retiring as a player, he served as head football coach at Marion High School in 1950 and 1951. He also worked for the Bell Fibre Corp for 30 years, retiring in 1980 as vice president of sales. He was inducted into the Indiana Football Hall of Fame in 1986. He died in 1996 at age 69.
