= 1949 Baltimore Colts season =

American football team season

1949 Baltimore Colts (1947–1950) season
- Head coach: Cecil Isbell and Walter Driskill
- Home stadium: Municipal Stadium

Results
- Record: 1–11
- Division place: 6th AAFC
- Playoffs: Did not qualify

Program for the November 6 game against the San Francisco Forty Niners.

Program for the Oct. 2 game against the Buffalo Bills.

The 1949 Baltimore Colts season was their fourth as a franchise, their last season in the AAFC before moving to the NFL, and their third season in Baltimore. The team failed to improve on their previous season's output of 7–7, winning only one game against 11 losses.

== Season schedule ==
Week	Date	Opponent	Result	Record	Venue	Game recap
1	August 28	at San Francisco 49ers	**L** 17–31	0–1	Kezar Stadium	Recap
2	September 2	at Los Angeles Dons	**L** 17–49	0–2	Los Angeles Memorial Coliseum	Recap
3	September 11	at Cleveland Browns	**L** 0–21	0–3	Cleveland Municipal Stadium	Recap
4	September 16	at Chicago Hornets	**L** 7–35	0–4	Soldier Field	Recap
5	September 25	Cleveland Browns	**L** 20–28	0–5	Memorial Stadium	Recap
6	October 2	at Buffalo Bills	**W** 35–28	1–5	Civic Stadium	Recap
7	Bye					
8	October 16	New York Yankees	**L** 21–24	1–6	Memorial Stadium	Recap
9	October 23	Chicago Hornets	**L** 7–17	1–7	Memorial Stadium	Recap
10	October 30	at New York Yankees	**L** 14–21	1–8	Yankee Stadium	Recap
11	Bye					
12	November 6	San Francisco 49ers	**L** 10–28	1–9	Memorial Stadium	Recap
13	November 20	Los Angeles Dons	**L** 10–21	1–10	Memorial Stadium	Recap
14	November 27	Buffalo Bills	**L** 14–38	1–11	Memorial Stadium	Recap
Note: Intra-division opponents are in **bold** text.

== League standings ==
AAFC standings
	W	L	T	PCT	PF	PA	STK
Cleveland Browns	9	1	2	.900	339	171	W2
San Francisco 49ers	9	3	0	.750	416	227	W3
New York Yankees	8	4	0	.667	196	206	L1
Buffalo Bills	5	5	2	.500	236	256	W2
Los Angeles Dons	4	8	0	.333	253	322	L1
Chicago Hornets	4	8	0	.333	179	268	L5
Baltimore Colts	1	11	0	.083	172	341	L6

Note: Tie games were not officially counted in the standings.

== Roster ==
Quarterbacks

- 63 Y. A. Tittle
- 67 Sam Vacanti OLB

Running backs

- 77 Lu Gambino
- 76 Chick Jagade OLB/CB
- 88 Paul Page CB
- 85 Bob Pfohl
- 82 Billy Stone
- 57 Herman Wedemeyer S

Receivers

- 51 Lamar Davis CB
- 55 Johnny North DE
- 53 Win Williams DE

Offensive lineman

- 31 Dick Barwegen G
- 41 Ernie Blandin T
- 33 Ken Cooper G/MG
- 30 Dub Garrett G
- 20 Felto Prewitt C
- 46 Jim Spruill T/DT

Defensive lineman

- 57 Hub Bechtol DE
- 35 Barry French MG/DT
- 47 Jon Jenkins MG/T
- 54 Bill Leonard DE
- 48 John Mellus DT
- 44 Al Sidorik DT/T

Linebackers

- 89 Bob Kelly OLB/RB
- 52 Bob Nowaskey OLB/DE
- 22 Pete Tillman MLB/C
- 71 Spiro Dellerba MLB/FB

Defensive backs

- 83 Bob Cowan CB/RB
- 80 Wayne Kingery S/RB
- 81 Jake Leicht CB/RB
- 84 Ralph Ruthstrom S

Special teams

- 74 Rex Grossman K/P

rookies in italics
