= Marion Shirley =

American football player (1922–1996)

- Marion Shirley in 1949

No. 32, 42
- Position: Tackle

Personal information
- Born: April 17, 1922; Denver, Colorado, U.S.
- Died: September 13, 1996 (aged 74); Stafford, Texas, U.S.
- Listed height: 6 ft 4 in (1.93 m)
- Listed weight: 260 lb (118 kg)

Career information
- High school: Classen (OK)
- College: Oklahoma State; Oklahoma City (1946-1947)
- NFL draft: 1947: 17th round, 147th overall pick

Career history
- New York Yankees (1948-1949); Chicago Hornets (1949)*
- * Offseason or practice squad member only

Career AAFC statistics
- Games played: 20
- Games started: 1
- Stats at Pro Football Reference

Marion Vaughn Shirley (April 17, 1922 – September 13, 1996) was an American football player who played at the tackle position. He played college football for Oklahoma City University and professional football for the New York Yankees.

== Early life ==
Shirley was born in 1922 in Denver. He attended and played football at Classen High School in Oklahoma City.

== College football and military service ==
He served in the United States Navy during World War II. After the war, he played college football for Oklahoma City University. He was a member of the 1946 Oklahoma City Chiefs football team that compiled a 10–1 record and the 1947 team that went 7–3.

== Professional football ==
He was selected by the Boston Yanks in the 17th round of the 1947 NFL draft and by the New York Yankees in the 1948 AAFC Draft. He played for the Yankees during their 1948 and 1949 seasons. He appeared in a total of 19 games for the Yankees. He was sold to the Chicago Hornets in May 1949, but returned to the Yankees in 1950.

== Family and later years ==
Shirley died in 1996 at age 74 in Stafford, Texas.
