= Mike Perrotti =

American football player (1923–1974)

No. 47
- Position: Tackle

Personal information
- Born: June 12, 1923; Cleveland, Ohio
- Died: November 30, 1974 (aged 51); Cincinnati, Ohio
- Listed height: 6 ft 3 in (1.91 m)
- Listed weight: 243 lb (110 kg)

Career information
- High school: Collinwood (OH)
- College: Ohio State, Cincinnati

Career history
- Los Angeles Dons (1948–1949)

Career statistics
- Games: 26
- Stats at Pro Football Reference

Michael Anthony Perrotti (June 12, 1923 – November 30, 1974) was an American football player who played at the tackle position. He played college football for Ohio State and Cincinnati and professional football for the Los Angeles Dons.

== Early life ==
Perrotti was born in 1923 in Cleveland. He attended and played football at Cleveland's Collinwood High School.

== Military and college football ==
He played college football for Ohio State in 1941. His college career was interrupted by service in the Army during World War II. After the war, he attended the University of Cincinnati and played football for the 1947 Cincinnati Bearcats football team.

== Professional football ==
In June 1949, Perrotti signed to play professional football in the All-America Football Conference (AAFC) for the Los Angeles Dons. He played for the Dons during their 1948 and 1949 seasons, appearing in 26 games.

== Later life ==
Perrotti later became the manager of the parts department at a General Electric plant in Evendale, Ohio. He died in 1974 at Bethesda North Hospital in Cincinnati after suffering a heart attack while driving his car.
