= Frank Perantoni =

American football player (1923–1991)

No. 20
- Position: Center

Personal information
- Born: September 13, 1923; Raritan, New Jersey, U.S.
- Died: September 11, 1991 (aged 67); Somerville, New Jersey, U.S.
- Listed height: 6 ft 0 in (1.83 m)
- Listed weight: 220 lb (100 kg)

Career information
- High school: Somerville (NJ); Blair Academy (NJ)
- College: Princeton

Career history
- New York Yankees (1948–1949)

Career statistics
- Games: 26
- Stats at Pro Football Reference

Joseph Francis Perantoni (September 13, 1923 – September 11, 1991) was an American football player who played at the center position. He played college football for Princeton and professional football for the New York Yankees.

== Early life ==
Perantoni was born in 1923 in Raritan, New Jersey. He attended and played football at Somerville High School and then played at Blair Academy after he graduated, both in New Jersey.

== College football and military service ==
Perantoni attended Princeton University and played for the 1942 Princeton Tigers football team. He became the second freshman to gain a spot in Princeton's varsity lineup.

His college career was interrupted by World War II. He was a pilot who flew B-24s in the United States Army Air Corps.

Perantoni returned to Princeton after the ware and played for the 1946 and 1947 Princeton seasons. In October 1946, he was elected by his teammates as the team captain. At the end of the 1947 season, he received Princeton's top football award, the John Prentiss Poe Cup. Coach Charlie Caldwell called Perantoni "one of the finest football players I have seen in 22 years of coaching." He was also invited to play in the East-West Shrine Game in 1946.

== Professional football ==
He played professional football in the All-America Football Conference (AAFC) for the New York Yankees during the 1948 and 1949 seasons. He appeared in a total of 26 games for the Yankees. He was the first person from Raritan to play professional football. On November 28, 1948, the Yankees celebrated "Perantoni Day" at Yankee Stadium; he was presented with an automobile by fans as part of the celebration.

== Family and later years ==
Perantoni was married in December 1946 to Madeline Harcarik. After his playing career ended, he went to work as an architect. In 1950, he was a founder of the firm of Shive, Spinelli and Perantoni in New Jersey. He remained with that firm as an active partner until 1979 and as a consultant until his death. In 1991, Perantoni died at age 67 in Somerville, New Jersey, where he had lived for several decades.
