= Bev Wallace =

American football player (1923–1992)

- Bev Wallace, 1946

No. 64, 53
- Position: Quarterback

Personal information
- Born: March 7, 1923; Comanche, Oklahoma, U.S.
- Died: June 17, 1992 (aged 69); Newport Beach, California, U.S.
- Listed height: 6 ft 2 in (1.88 m)
- Listed weight: 180 lb (82 kg)

Career information
- High school: Santa Paula (CA); Compton (CA)
- College: Compton City College

Career history
- San Francisco 49ers (1947–1949); New York Yanks (1951)

Career statistics
- Games played: 24
- Passing yards: 266
- Stats at Pro Football Reference

Beverly William Wallace (March 7, 1923 – June 17, 1992) was an American football player who played at the quarterback position on both offense and defense. He played college football for Compton City College and professional football for the San Francisco 49ers and New York Yanks.

== Early life ==
Wallace was born in 1923 in Comanche, Oklahoma. He attended Santa Paul High School and Compton High School, both in California.

== College football ==
Wallace played college football for Compton College in 1941, 1942, and 1946. He also served in the United States Army. He played halfback at Compton, passed for 1,172 yards in 1946, and led the team to a national junior college football championship and a 19–0 victory over Kilgore Junior College in the first annual "Little Rose Bowl"

== Professional football ==
Wallace played professional football in the All-America Football Conference for the San Francisco 49ers during their 1947, 1948, and 1949 seasons. He appeared in a total of 23 games for the 49ers. He also appeared in one game for the 1951 New York Yanks. He totaled 266 passing yards in his four years in professional football.

== Family and later years ==
Wallace died in 1992 at age 69 in Newport Beach, California.
