= Ned Maloney =

American football player (1923–2011)

- Maloney in 1949

No. 59
- Position: End

Personal information
- Born: April 23, 1923; Chicago, Illinois, U.S.
- Died: October 7, 2011 (aged 88); Lafayette, Indiana, U.S.
- Listed height: 6 ft 1 in (1.85 m)
- Listed weight: 190 lb (86 kg)

Career information
- High school: Fenwick (IL)
- College: Purdue
- NFL draft: 1946: 21st round, 198th overall pick

Career history

Playing
- San Francisco 49ers (1948–1949)

Coaching
- Purdue (1951-1972) (Assistant)

Career NFL statistics
- Games played: 26
- Games started: 1
- Stats at Pro Football Reference

Norman Edward "Ned" Maloney (April 21, 1923 – October 7, 2011) was an American professional football player who played at the end position. He played college football for Purdue and professional football for the San Francisco 49ers of the All-America Football Conference (AAFC).

== Biography ==
=== Early life ===
Maloney was born in 1923 in Chicago. He attended and played football at Fenwick High School in Oak Park, Illinois.

=== Military and college football ===
Maloney in 1945

He played college football for the Purdue Boilermakers in 1942 and from 1945 to 1947. He served in the United States Marine Corps from 1942 to 1945 as part of Carlson's Raiders in the Pacific Theatre.

=== Professional football ===
Maloney was selected by the Detroit Lions in the 21st round (198th pick) of the 1946 NFL draft but did not play for the Lions. He played in the All-America Football Conference for the San Francisco 49ers during their 1948 and 1949 seasons. He appeared in 26 games for the 49ers and recorded one touchdown reception.

=== Later life ===
When his playing career ended, Maloney was a football coach at Purdue for 22 years. He was also named to the all-time Purdue football team and inducted into the Purdue Intercollegiate Athletic Hall of Fame.

=== Death and legacy ===
He died in 2011 at age 88 in Lafayette, Indiana.
