= 1949 New York Yankees (AAFC) season =

American football team season

- Owner: Dan Topping
- Head coach: Red Strader
- Home stadium: Yankee Stadium

Results
- Record: 8–4
- Division place: 2nd AAFC
- Playoffs: Lost Divisional Playoffs (at 49ers) 7–17

The 1949 New York Yankees season was their fourth and final in the All-America Football Conference. The team improved on their previous output of 6-8, winning eight games. They lost to the San Francisco 49ers in the first round of the playoffs and the team folded with the league after the season.

== Season schedule ==
Game	Date	Opponent	Result	Record	Venue	Recap	Sources
1	September 11	at Buffalo Bills	W 17–14	1–0	War Memorial Stadium	Recap	
2	September 18	at Cleveland Browns	L 3–14	1–1	Cleveland Stadium	Recap	
3	September 22	Los Angeles Dons	W 10–7	2–1	Yankee Stadium	Recap	
—	Bye						
4	October 7	Chicago Hornets	W 38–24	3–1	Soldier Field	Recap	
5	October 16	at Baltimore Colts	W 24–21	4–1	Municipal Stadium	Recap	
6	October 23	San Francisco 49ers	W 24–3	5–1	Yankee Stadium	Recap	
7	October 30	Baltimore Colts	W 21-14	6–1	Yankee Stadium	Recap	
8	November 6	Buffalo Bills	L 14–17	6–2	Yankee Stadium	Recap	
9	November 13	Chicago Hornets	W 14-10	7–2	Cleveland Stadium	Recap	
10	November 20	Cleveland Browns	L 0–31	7–3	Yankee Stadium	Recap	
11	November 24	at Los Angeles Dons	W 17–16	8–3	L.A. Memorial Coliseum	Recap	
12	November 27	at San Francisco 49ers	L 14–35	8–4	Kezar Stadium	Recap	

== Playoffs ==
Program for the December 4 playoff game between the Yankees and the San Francisco 49ers.

Round	Date	Opponent	Result	Venue	Recap	Sources
Division	December 4	at San Francisco 49ers	L 7–17	Kezar Stadium	Recap	

== Division standings ==
AAFC standings
	W	L	T	PCT	PF	PA	STK
Cleveland Browns	9	1	2	.900	339	171	W2
San Francisco 49ers	9	3	0	.750	416	227	W3
New York Yankees	8	4	0	.667	196	206	L1
Buffalo Bills	5	5	2	.500	236	256	W2
Los Angeles Dons	4	8	0	.333	253	322	L1
Chicago Hornets	4	8	0	.333	179	268	L5
Baltimore Colts	1	11	0	.083	172	341	L6

Note: Tie games were not officially counted in the standings.

== Roster ==
1949 New York Yankees final roster
Quarterbacks: 61 Gil Johnson; 60 Don Panciera; Running backs: 73 Mickey Colmer P; 76 Sherman Howard CB; 70 Bob Kennedy LB; 81 Lou Kusserow; 72 Eddie Prokop LB; 76 Buddy Young; Receivers: 51 Bruce Alford; 57 Dan Garza DE; 53 Jack Russell	Linemen: 38 George Brown G; 43 Bill Chambers DT/T; 55 Van Davis DE/WR; 23 Brad Ecklund C; 33 Bill Erickson G; 59 Paul Mitchell DT; 58 Barney Poole DE/WR; 40 Martin Ruby T/DT; 30 Ed Sharkey MG/G; 42 Marion Shirley T/DT; 31 Joe Signaigo G; 44 Arnie Weinmeister T/DT; 35 John Wozniak G	Linebackers: 88 Harvey Johnson K; 32 John Mastrangelo; 20 Frank Perantoni C; Defensive backs: 82 Duke Iversen S/RB; 85 Tom Landry CB/RB; 62 Pete Layden CB/RB/P; 90 Harmon Rowe CB/RB; 56 Otto Schnellbacher S/WR; Reserve list: 83 Lowell Tew RB (IR); rookies in italics
