= Joyce Pipkin =

American football player (1924–2017)

No. 31, 62, 63
- Positions: End, defensive end, back

Personal information
- Born: January 9, 1924; Lono, Arkansas, U.S.
- Died: April 11, 2017 (aged 93); Bethlehem, Pennsylvania, U.S.
- Listed height: 6 ft 1 in (1.85 m)
- Listed weight: 204 lb (93 kg)

Career information
- High school: Hot Springs (AR)
- College: Arkansas (1941, 1946-1947)
- NFL draft: 1945: 29th round, 306th overall pick

Career history
- New York Giants (1948); Los Angeles Dons (1949)

Career NFL/AAFC statistics
- Receptions: 2
- Receiving yards: 28
- Fumble recoveries: 2
- Stats at Pro Football Reference

Joyce Clarence Pipkin (January 9, 1924 – April 11, 2017) was an American professional football offensive end who played for the New York Giants and Los Angeles Dons. He played college football at the University of Arkansas, having previously attended Hot Springs High School in his home state of Arkansas. He died in 2017, at the age of 93.
