= Dan Garza =

American football player (1924–2002)

- Garza, circa 1947

No. 57, 7
- Position: End

Personal information
- Born: February 21, 1924; Anderson, South Carolina, U.S.
- Died: March 6, 2002 (aged 78); Tucson, Arizona, U.S.
- Listed height: 6 ft 3 in (1.91 m)
- Listed weight: 203 lb (92 kg)

Career information
- High school: Brackenridge (San Antonio, Texas)
- College: Oregon
- NFL draft: 1948: 15th round, 126th overall pick

Career history
- New York Yankees (1949); New York Yanks (1951)

Awards and highlights
- Third-team All-American (1948); First-team All-PCC (1948)
- Stats at Pro Football Reference

Daniel Robert Garza (February 21, 1924 – March 6, 2002) was an American professional football player who was an end for the New York Yankees of the All-America Football Conference (AAFC) and the New York Yanks of the National Football League (NFL). He played college football at North Texas, Central Missouri, and Oregon. He was selected by the New York Giants in the 15th round of the 1948 NFL draft.

== Early life ==
Daniel Robert Garza was born on February 21, 1924, in Anderson, South Carolina. He attended Brackenridge High School in San Antonio, Texas.

== College career ==
Garza enrolled at North Texas State Teachers College to play college football for the Eagles. As a freshman in 1942, he was the starting left end for the varsity team. He was starting right end for the Mules of Central Missouri State Teachers College in 1943. Garza then served on an Underwater Demolition Team, predecessors of the Navy SEALs, during World War II.

Garza was a three-year letterman for the Oregon Ducks from 1946 to 1948. He missed the 1946 season due to injury. Through the first three games of the 1947 season, Garza had 11 receptions for a nation-leading 257 yards. He finished the year as Oregon's leading receiver with 21 catches for 365 yards and three touchdowns. In 1948, he earned first-team All-Pacific Coast Conference and Football Writers Association of America third-team All-American honors.

== Professional career ==
Garza was selected by the New York Giants in the 15th round, with the 126th overall pick, of the 1948 NFL draft and by the New York Yankees in the 7th round, with the 48th overall pick, of the 1949 AAFC draft. At the conclusion of his college career, Garza signed with the Yankees on January 4, 1949. He played in all 12 games for the Yankees during the 1949 season in a reserve role, recording nine receptions for 193 yards and one kick return for 21 yards.

After the AAFC was absorbed by the NFL, Garza and some other Yankees players were allocated to the New York Giants. However, he did not end up playing for the Giants, instead opting to spend the year studying dentistry at the University of Oregon.

Garza signed with the New York Yanks of the National Football League (NFL) on July 21, 1951. He played in all 12 games, starting 10, for the Yanks during the 1951 season, catching 31 passes for 470 yards and a team-leading four touchdowns.

== Personal life ==
Garza graduated from the University of Oregon School of Dentistry in 1955. He served as a dentist in the Navy, and then in Portland, Oregon, for 33 years. He retired in 1992. Garza died of cancer on March 6, 2002, in Tucson, Arizona.
