= 1949 San Francisco 49ers season =

American football team season

- Owner: Tony Morabito
- General manager: John Blackinger
- Head coach: Buck Shaw
- Home stadium: Kezar Stadium

Results
- Record: 9–3
- Division place: 2nd AAFC
- Playoffs: Won Divisional Playoffs (vs. Yankees) 17–7; Lost AAFC Championship (at Browns) 7–21

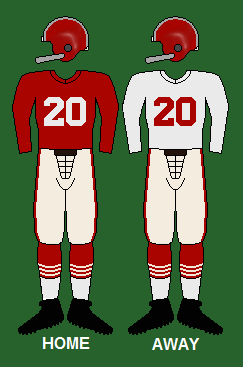
Illustration of the San Francisco 49ers’ 1949 uniforms, featuring red jerseys with white numerals for home games and white jerseys with red numerals for away games, paired with white pants.

The 1949 San Francisco 49ers season was the franchise's fourth season in the All-America Football Conference (AAFC). The 1949 season was the final season before the league folded and comprised only twelve games instead of the previously standard fourteen. The 49ers were unable to improve on the previous season's output of 12–2, only posting a record of 9–3, however, they were able to make their first playoff appearance. This was due to the league taking a different format, in which the top four teams played a tournament to determine the champion.

The 49ers, with the second seed, played the third-seeded New York Yankees (8–4). With their 17–7 victory over the Yankees, the 49ers moved on to play the Cleveland Browns in the league championship. The 49ers ended up losing 21–7. Until Super Bowl XLVII, it was the only time the 49ers lost a league title game.

== Preseason ==
Week	Date	Opponent	Result	Record	Venue
1	August 10	at Los Angeles Dons	W 28–7	1–0	Los Angeles Memorial Coliseum
2	August 14	Buffalo Bills	W 21–10	2–0	Kezar Stadium
3	August 19	at Cleveland Browns	T 21–21	2–0–1	Cleveland Municipal Stadium

== Schedule ==
Week	Date	Opponent	Result	Record	Venue	Recap
1	August 28	Baltimore Colts	W 31–17	1–0	Kezar Stadium	Recap
2	September 4	Chicago Hornets	W 42–7	2–0	Kezar Stadium	Recap
3	Bye					
4	September 18	Los Angeles Dons	W 42–14	3–0	Kezar Stadium	Recap
5	September 25	at Buffalo Bills	L 17–28	3–1	Civic Stadium	Recap
6	September 30	at Chicago Hornets	W 42–24	4–1	Soldier Field	Recap
7	October 9	Cleveland Browns	W 56–28	5–1	Kezar Stadium	Recap
8	October 16	Buffalo Bills	W 51–7	6–1	Kezar Stadium	Recap
9	October 23	at New York Yankees	L 3–24	6–2	Yankee Stadium	Recap
10	October 30	at Cleveland Browns	L 28–30	6–3	Cleveland Municipal Stadium	Recap
11	November 6	at Baltimore Colts	W 28–10	7–3	Memorial Stadium	Recap
12	November 13	at Los Angeles Dons	W 41–24	8–3	Los Angeles Coliseum	Recap
13	Bye					
14	November 27	New York Yankees	W 35–14	9–3	Kezar Stadium	Recap

== Playoffs ==
Program for the December 4 playoff game between the Forty Niners and the New York Yankees.

Round	Date	Opponent (seed)	Result	Record	Venue	Recap
Semifinals	December 4	New York Yankees (3)	W 17–7	1–0	Kezar Stadium	Recap
Championship	December 11	Cleveland Browns (1)	L 7–21	1–1	Cleveland Municipal Stadium	Recap

== Standings ==
AAFC standings
	W	L	T	PCT	PF	PA	STK
Cleveland Browns	9	1	2	.900	339	171	W2
San Francisco 49ers	9	3	0	.750	416	227	W3
New York Yankees	8	4	0	.667	196	206	L1
Buffalo Bills	5	5	2	.500	236	256	W2
Los Angeles Dons	4	8	0	.333	253	322	L1
Chicago Hornets	4	8	0	.333	179	268	L5
Baltimore Colts	1	11	0	.083	172	341	L6

Note: Tie games were not officially counted in the standings.

== Roster ==
1949 San Francisco 49ers final roster
Quarterbacks: 63 Frankie Albert P; 64 Bev Wallace; Backs: 85 Eddie Carr CB/RB; 93 Jim Cason S/RB; 83 Sam Cathcart RB/S; 81 Len Eshmont RB/CB; 88 Don Garlin RB/CB; 71 Verl Lillywhite RB/CB; 74 Joe Perry FB; 82 Joe Vetrano RB/CB/K; 92 Lowell Wagner CB/RB; Receivers: 53 Alyn Beals; 55 Paul Salata; 58 Nick Susoeff	Linemen/Linebackers: 33 Bruno Banducci G/MG; 54 Gail Bruce DE/WR; 42 Bob Bryant T/DT; 40 Jack Carpenter T/DT; 31 Don Clark MLB/G; 46 Ray Evans DT/T; 34 Visco Grgich MG/G; 37 Homer Hobbs G; 23 Bill Johnson C/LB; 59 Ned Maloney DE; 47 Bob Mike DT/T; 48 Joe Morgan T/DT; 45 Chuck Quilter T; 52 Hal Shoener DE/WR; 72 Norm Standlee OLB/FB; 22 Pete Wismann OLB/C; 41 John Woudenberg T/DT; 24 Tino Sabuco C	Reserve list: 91 Johnny Strzykalski RB (IR); rookies in italics
