= 1949 Los Angeles Dons season =

American football team season

- Head coach: Jimmy Phelan
- Home stadium: Los Angeles Memorial Coliseum

Results
- Record: 4–8
- Division place: 5th AAFC
- Playoffs: Did not qualify

The 1949 Los Angeles Dons season was their fourth and final season in the All-America Football Conference. The team failed to improve on their previous output of 7–7, winning only four games. They failed to qualify for the playoffs for the fourth consecutive season and folded with the league after the season.

== Schedule ==
| Game | Date | Opponent | Result | Record | Venue | Attendance | Recap | Sources |
|---|---|---|---|---|---|---|---|---|
| 1 | September 2 | Baltimore Colts | W 49–17 | 1–0 | L.A. Memorial Coliseum | 20,211 | Recap | |
| 2 | September 9 | Chicago Hornets | L 21–23 | 1–1 | L.A. Memorial Coliseum | 30,193 | Recap | |
| 3 | September 18 | at San Francisco 49ers | L 14–42 | 1–2 | Kezar Stadium | 31,960 | Recap | |
| 4 | September 22 | at New York Yankees | L 7–10 | 2–2 | Yankee Stadium | 14,437 | Recap | |
| 5 | October 2 | at Cleveland Browns | L 7–42 | 2–3 | Cleveland Stadium | 30,465 | Recap | |
| 6 | October 9 | Buffalo Bills | W 42–28 | 3–3 | L.A. Memorial Coliseum | 16,575 | Recap | |
| 7 | October 14 | Cleveland Browns | L 14–61 | 3–4 | L.A. Memorial Coliseum | 27,427 | Recap | |
| 8 | October 23 | at Buffalo Bills | L 14–17 | 3–5 | Civic Stadium | 21,310 | Recap | |
| 9 | October 28 | at Chicago Hornets | W 24–14 | 3–6 | Soldier Field | 11,249 | Recap | |
| — | Bye | | | | | | | |
| 10 | November 13 | San Francisco 49ers | L 24–41 | 3–7 | L.A. Memorial Coliseum | 17,880 | Recap | |
| 11 | November 20 | at Baltimore Colts | W 21–10 | 4–7 | Memorial Stadium | 19,503 | Recap | |
| 12 | November 24 | New York Yankees | L 16–17 | 4–8 | L.A. Memorial Coliseum | 20,096 | Recap | |

== Roster ==
1949 Los Angeles Dons final roster
| Offensive backs: 76 Walt Clay; 65 Glenn Dobbs P; 85 Billy Grimes; 66 Bob Hoffman LB; 60 George Murphy; 73 Hosea Rodgers; 93 George Taliaferro CB; Receivers: 50 Len Ford DE; 56 Lew Holder; 54 Dick Wilkins | Linemen/Linebackers: 52 Burr Baldwin DE/WR; 29 John Brown G/C/LB; 33 Bob Dobelstein LB; 65 Dan Dworsky C; 44 Ed Henke DE/DT; 40 Ed Kelley T/DT; 30 Al Lolotai G; 22 Bob Nelson C/K; 47 Mike Perrotti MG/G; 62 Joyce Pipkin DE; 32 Knox Ramsey G/MG; 45 Bob Reinhard T/DT; 48 Buddy Tinsley T/DT; 42 Ernie Williamson DT; 55 Abner Wimberly DE/WR; 27 Dick Woodard LB/C | Defensive backs: 83 Paul Crowe S; 88 Harper Davis CB/RB; 97 Earl Howell CB/RB; 82 Bob Kennedy CB/RB; 92 Shorty McWilliams CB; 77 Jim Spavital S/FB; Reserve list: 57 Joe Aguirre WR/DE (IR); rookies in italics |

== Division standings ==
Program for the November 24 game against the New York Yankees.

AAFC standings
| | W | L | T | PCT | PF | PA | STK |
|---|---|---|---|---|---|---|---|
| Cleveland Browns | 9 | 1 | 2 | .900 | 339 | 171 | W2 |
| San Francisco 49ers | 9 | 3 | 0 | .750 | 416 | 227 | W3 |
| New York Yankees | 8 | 4 | 0 | .667 | 196 | 206 | L1 |
| Buffalo Bills | 5 | 5 | 2 | .500 | 236 | 256 | W2 |
| Los Angeles Dons | 4 | 8 | 0 | .333 | 253 | 322 | L1 |
| Chicago Hornets | 4 | 8 | 0 | .333 | 179 | 268 | L5 |
| Baltimore Colts | 1 | 11 | 0 | .083 | 172 | 341 | L6 |

Note: Tie games were not officially counted in the standings.
