= Ed Sustersic =

American football player (1922–1967)

No. 70
- Positions: Fullback, linebacker

Personal information
- Born: January 7, 1922; Cleveland, Ohio, U.S.
- Died: January 18, 1967 (aged 45); Brecksville, Ohio, U.S.
- Listed height: 6 ft 0 in (1.83 m)
- Listed weight: 205 lb (93 kg)

Career information
- High school: John Marshall (Cleveland, Ohio)
- College: Findlay

Career history
- Cleveland Browns (1949)

Awards and highlights
- AAFC Champion (1949); Findlay Athletic Hall of Fame (1971)

Career statistics
- Games: 11
- Rushing yards: 114
- Stats at Pro Football Reference

Edward J. "Foozy" Sustersic (January 7, 1922 – January 18, 1967) was an American football fullback and linebacker who played one season in the All-America Football Conference (AAFC) for the Cleveland Browns.

A native of Cleveland, Sustersic was a star football player and wrestler at his local high school. He attended Findlay College, where he continued his athletic career and won a state amateur wrestling championship. His college career was interrupted by service in the United States Army Air Corps during World War II, but he returned to Findlay and was named an All-Ohio fullback in 1947. He then played one season for the Browns in 1949. The team won the AAFC championship that year.

Sustersic held a number of coaching jobs in Ohio after leaving the Browns. He became a coach at Brecksville-Broadview Heights High School in 1958, and was named its athletic director in 1961. He died in 1967 of a heart attack. Four years later, he was inducted into Findlay's athletics hall of fame.

== Early life and college ==
Sustersic grew up in Cleveland and attended John Marshall High School, where he played football and won a city championship in wrestling before graduating in 1941. He continued to wrestle and play football at the Findlay College in Findlay, Ohio, and won the Ohio Amateur Athletic Union heavyweight wrestling championship. He left Findlay early in his college career, however, to serve in the United States Army Air Forces during World War II. He rose to the rank of sergeant and won a heavyweight boxing championship while stationed at Keesler Air Force Base in Mississippi. Sustersic returned to Findlay after the war, and resumed his football career there, playing as a fullback. He was named a first-team All-Ohio fullback by the Associated Press after the 1947 season. He graduated in 1948.

== Professional career ==
Sustersic signed to play for the Cleveland Browns of the All-America Football Conference (AAFC) in 1949. He was the team's third-string fullback, playing behind Marion Motley and Tony Adamle, as well as a linebacker on defense. Sustersic scored two touchdowns in a pre-season game against the Chicago Hornets, but saw little action during the season. He substituted for Motley after the starter was injured in a September game against the Baltimore Colts. Led by an offense that featured Motley, quarterback Otto Graham and ends Dante Lavelli and Mac Speedie, team won the AAFC championship that year. Sustersic finished the season with 114 rushing yards on 23 carries and a touchdown.

== Later life and death ==
Sustersic retired from football after the 1949 season. After stints as an assistant coach at Findlay, Sidney High School and Elyria Catholic High School, he was named the head football coach at St. Mary's School in Sandusky, Ohio in 1954, and stayed in that position for four years. He then took a job as the head baseball coach and assistant football coach at Brecksville-Broadview Heights High School near Brecksville, Ohio. In 1960, he and head football coach Joe Vadini launched the Brecksville Holiday Invitational, a wrestling tournament that quickly became an important scholastic wrestling event. Sustersic was named the athletic director at Brecksville in 1961 and stepped down as an assistant for the football team. He returned to football in 1965, however, as Brecksville's line coach.

Sustersic died suddenly in 1967 of a heart attack while he was running in the Brecksville gym during school. He and his wife, Jean, had four sons. He was inducted into Findlay's Athletic Hall of Fame in 1971.
