= Eddie Carr (American football) =

American football player (1923–2011)

- Eddie Carr in 1949

Profile
- Position: Halfback

Personal information
- Born: April 27, 1923
- Died: January 7, 2011 (aged 87); Pasco County, Florida, U.S.
- Listed height: 6 ft 0 in (1.83 m)
- Listed weight: 185 lb (84 kg)

Career information
- High school: Olney (PA)
- College: none

Career history
- San Francisco 49ers: (1947-1949)

Career statistics
- Games played: 30
- Starts: 3
- Yards rushing: 283
- Yards receiving: 246
- Touchdowns: 8
- Interceptions: 16
- Stats at Pro Football Reference

Edwin Forest "Eddie" Carr (April 27, 1923 – January 7, 2011) was an American professional football halfback who played three seasons in the All-America Football Conference (AAFC) for the San Francisco 49ers.

== Biography ==
Carr was born in 1923. He attended Olney High School in Philadelphia where he won three letters in football, three in baseball, and one in basketball. He then attended Valley Forge Military Academy in Wayne, Pennsylvania. He was selected as the most valuable player on the Valley Forge football team in 1945.

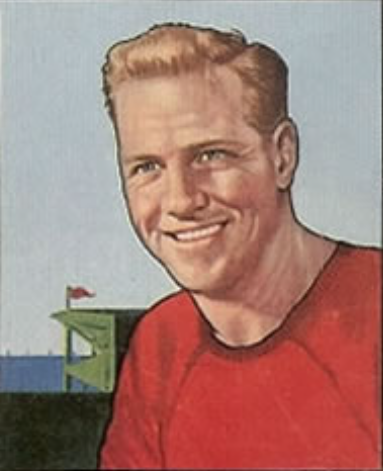
Eddie Carr on a 1950 Bowman football card.

Carr signed with the San Francisco 49ers in 1947. At the time, he was reported to be 19 or 20 years old, though databases indicate that he was actually 24 years old in the fall of 1947. He played at the halfback position for the 49ers from 1947 to 1949, appearing in a total of 30 AAFC games, three as a starter. He totaled 283 rushing yards and 246 receiving yards, intercepted 14 passes, and scored nine touchdowns.

During the 1949 season, Carr sustained a severe leg injury. He was leading the AAFC in interceptions at the time of his injury. He underwent surgery and attempted a comeback in 1950. He re-injured the leg and was advised by doctors to stop playing football. Instead, Carr sought to rehabilitate the leg, lifting a 50-pound weight with the leg 200 times a day. He signed a new contract with the 49ers in 1952 but did not appear in any further regular-season games.

Carr was an all-around athlete and also excelled in golf. He joined Sandy Run Country Club after retiring from football. He qualified for match play competition in the 1960 Philadelphia Amateur Championship at Huntingdon Valley Country Club. He won his first two matches to reach the quarter final.

Carr died on January 7, 2011, at the age of 87.
