= Wayne Kingery =

American football player (1927–2016)

Profile
- Position: Halfback

Personal information
- Born: June 5, 1927; Lake Charles, Louisiana
- Died: June 2, 2016 (aged 88); Lake Charles, Louisiana
- Listed height: 5 ft 11 in (1.80 m)
- Listed weight: 175 lb (79 kg)

Career information
- High school: Lake Charles (LA)
- College: LSU, McNeese State

Career history
- Baltimore Colts (1949)
- Stats at Pro Football Reference

B. Wayne Kingery (June 5, 1927 – June 2, 2016) was an American football halfback and defensive back who played for the Baltimore Colts. He played college football at McNeese State University, having previously attended Lake Charles High School. He was inducted into the McNeese State Hall of Fame in 1980.
