= 1949 Buffalo Bills season =

American football team season

1949 Buffalo Bills (AAFC) season
- Head coach: Red Dawson and Clem Crowe
- Home stadium: Civic Stadium

Results
- Record: 5–5–2
- Division place: 3rd AAFC
- Playoffs: Lost Divisional Playoffs (at Browns) 21–31

Program for the Oct. 2 game against the Baltimore Colts.

The 1949 season was the fourth and final season of the Buffalo Bills in the All-America Football Conference. The team failed to improve on their previous output of 7–7, winning only five games. They qualified for the playoffs, but lost to the Cleveland Browns who went on to beat the San Francisco 49ers for the final AAFC Championship.

== Season schedule ==
Week	Date	Opponent	Result	Record	Venue	Recap	Sources
1	August 26	at Chicago Hornets	L 14–17	0–1	Soldier Field	Recap	
2	September 5	Cleveland Browns	T 28–28	0–1–1	Civic Stadium	Recap	
3	September 11	New York Yankees	L 14–17	0–2–1	Civic Stadium	Recap	
—	Bye						
4	September 25	San Francisco 49ers	W 28–17	1–2–1	Civic Stadium	Recap	
5	October 2	Baltimore Colts	L 28–35	1–3–1	Civic Stadium	Recap	
6	October 9	at Los Angeles Dons	L 28–42	1–4–1	LA Memorial Coliseum	Recap	
7	October 16	at San Francisco 49ers	L 7–51	1–5–1	Kezar Stadium	Recap	
8	October 23	Los Angeles Dons	W 17–14	2–5–1	Civic Stadium	Recap	
—	Bye						
9	November 6	at New York Yankees	W 17–14	3–5–1	Yankee Stadium	Recap	
10	November 13	at Cleveland Browns	T 7–7	3–5–2	Municipal Stadium	Recap	
11	November 20	Chicago Hornets	W 10–0	4–5–2	Civic Stadium	Recap	
12	November 27	at Baltimore Colts	W 38–14	5–5–2	Municipal Stadium	Recap	

== Playoffs ==
Round	Date	Opponent	Result	Venue	Recap	Sources
Division	December 4	Cleveland Browns	L 21–31	Cleveland Municipal Stadium	Recap	

== Division standings ==
AAFC standings
	W	L	T	PCT	PF	PA	STK
Cleveland Browns	9	1	2	.900	339	171	W2
San Francisco 49ers	9	3	0	.750	416	227	W3
New York Yankees	8	4	0	.667	196	206	L1
Buffalo Bills	5	5	2	.500	236	256	W2
Los Angeles Dons	4	8	0	.333	253	322	L1
Chicago Hornets	4	8	0	.333	179	268	L5
Baltimore Colts	1	11	0	.083	172	341	L6

Note: Tie games were not officially counted in the standings.

== Roster ==
1949 Buffalo Bills final roster
Quarterbacks: 61 George Ratterman; 63 Jim Still P; Running backs: 82 Rex Bumgardner; 70 Ollie Cline; 71 Veto Kissell OLB; 83 Chet Mutryn; 87 Lou Tomasetti; 87 Wilbur Volz CB; Receivers: 57 Al Baldwin CB; 59 Jim Lukens	Offensive linemen: 40 Abe Gibron G/T; 46 John Kerns T/DT; 30 Rocco Pirro G; 22 Art Statuto C; 32 Odell Stautzenberger G/MG; Defensive linemen: 42 Chet Adams DT/K; 31 Ed King MG; 47 John Kissell DT/T; 34 John Maskas MG; 58 Vince Mazza DE; 56 Bob Oristaglio DE/WR; 53 Bill Stanton DE	Linebackers: 26 Hal Herring MLB/C; 73 Ed Hirsch OLB/FB; 72 Bill Schroll OLB/FB; 23 Carl Schuette OLB; 34 Vic Vasicek MLB/G; Defensive backs: 88 Tommy Colella CB/RB/P; 52 Paul Gibson CB/WR; 80 Bob Livingstone S/RB; 86 Joe Sutton S/RB; 82 Alex Wizbicki CB/RB; rookies in italics
