= 1949 Chicago Hornets season =

American football team season

- Head coach: Ray Flaherty
- Home stadium: Soldier Field

Results
- Record: 4–8
- Division place: 4th AAFC
- Playoffs: did not qualify

The 1949 Chicago Hornets season was their fourth and final season in the All-America Football Conference. The team improved on their previous output of 1–13, winning four games. Despite the improvement, they failed to qualify for the playoffs and the team folded with the league.

== Exhibition games ==
Week	Date	Opponent	Result	Record	Venue	Attendance	Sources
1	August 14	at Cleveland Browns	L 0–21	0–1	Glass Bowl		
2	August 18	at Bay City All-Stars	W 48–2	1–1	Central High School Stadium		
3	October 16	at Knoxville Rebels	W 28–3	2–1	Evans-Collins Field		

== Schedule ==
Game	Date	Opponent	Result	Record	Venue	Attendance	Recap	Sources
1	August 26	Buffalo Bills	W 17–14	1–0	Soldier Field	23,800	Recap	
2	September 4	at San Francisco 49ers	L 7–42	1–1	Kezar Stadium	28,311	Recap	
3	September 9	at Los Angeles Dons	W 23–21	2–1	L.A. Memorial Coliseum	30,193	Recap	
4	September 16	Baltimore Colts	W 35–7	3–1	Soldier Field	18,483	Recap	
—	Bye							
5	September 30	San Francisco 49ers	L 24–42	3–2	Soldier Field	31,561	Recap	
6	October 7	New York Yankees	L 24–38	3–3	Soldier Field	17,098	Recap	
—	Bye							
7	October 23	at Baltimore Colts	W 17–7	4–3	Memorial Stadium	23,107	Recap	
8	October 28	Los Angeles Dons	L 14–24	4–4	Soldier Field	11,249	Recap	
9	November 6, 1949	at Cleveland Browns	L 2–35	4–5	Cleveland Municipal Stadium	16,506	Recap	
10	November 13	at New York Yankees	L 10–14	4–6	Yankee Stadium	9,091	Recap	
11	November 20	at Buffalo Bills	L 0–10	4–7	Civic Stadium	18,494	Recap	
12	November 24	Cleveland Browns	L 6–14	4–8	Soldier Field	5,031	Recap	

== Division standings ==
AAFC standings
	W	L	T	PCT	PF	PA	STK
Cleveland Browns	9	1	2	.900	339	171	W2
San Francisco 49ers	9	3	0	.750	416	227	W3
New York Yankees	8	4	0	.667	196	206	L1
Buffalo Bills	5	5	2	.500	236	256	W2
Los Angeles Dons	4	8	0	.333	253	322	L1
Chicago Hornets	4	8	0	.333	179	268	L5
Baltimore Colts	1	11	0	.083	172	341	L6

Note: Tie games were not officially counted in the standings.

== Roster ==
1949 Chicago Hornets final roster
Backs: 60 Hardy Brown S/FB; 70 George Buksar FB/LB; 99 Bob Chappuis RB; 72 Johnny Clement RB; 71 Rip Collins RB/P; 82 John Donaldson CB/RB; 64 Bob Hoernschemeyer RB; 61 Walt McDonald S/FB; 83 Paul Patterson CB/RB; 88 Ray Ramsey RB/CB; 80 Bob Sweiger RB; Receivers: 51 Dan Edwards DE; 50 Hank Foldberg DE	Linemen/Linebackers: 33 Jim Bailey MG; 53 Paul Cleary DE; 46 Johnny Clowes DT; 45 Ziggy Czarobski T/DT; 44 Ted Hazelwood T/DT; 56 Bob Heck DE; 57 Bob Jensen DE/WR; 43 Nate Johnson DT; 52 Jim McCarthy DE/WR/K; 27 Fred Negus LB/C; 40 Homer Paine T/DT; 30 Jim Pearcy G; 20 John Rapacz LB/C; 32 Ray Richeson MG/G; 34 Herb St. John G/MG; 25 George Strohmeyer LB; 31 Marty Wendell G/LB; Rookies in italics
