= William J. Leonard =

American football player (1927–2006)

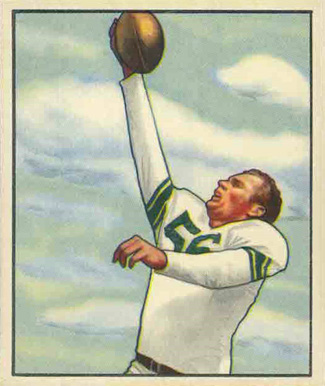
Bill Leonard in the green-and-white of the first Baltimore Colts franchise on a 1950 Bowman card

William J. "Bill" Leonard (April 27, 1927 – July 20, 2006) was an end for the University of Notre Dame's undefeated football team, which won 1947 the National Championship. Earlier, he had won recognition as an All-City football player at Youngstown, Ohio's East High School.

== Biography ==
=== Early years ===
Bill Leonard was born in Youngstown, the son of Patrick and Anna (Welsh) Leonard. From 1942 to 1944, he played for the East High School football team, where he was first-team All-City in 1943 and 1944, was first-team All-County in 1944, and was second-team All-Ohio in 1944.

=== College career ===
In 1945, he played for the Notre Dame football team. His long reception set up the disputed score against Navy, which ended in a 6–6 tie at Cleveland Stadium. In 1946, he served in the U.S. Army for 18 months. The following year, Leonard played for the undefeated Notre Dame football team that won the National Championship under legendary coach Frank Leahy, whose players were known as "Leahy's lads". The 1947 team, which had two Heisman Trophy winners, Johnny Lujack and Leon Hart, was cited by Sports Illustrated as the best college football team of all time. The Fighting Irish, who never trailed in a single game that year, saw 41 of its players go on to play professional football, including Leonard.

=== Professional career ===
Leonard played for two seasons with the Baltimore Colts, in 1949 and 1950, and spent a year in the Canadian Football League in 1951.

=== Later years ===
When his professional athletic career ended, Leonard returned to Youngstown, where he worked for 32 years in Research and Development for Commercial Intertech. In 1952, he married the former Helen Weber. The couple had five sons and six daughters. Leonard was an active member of St. Edward's Church, on the North Side of Youngstown.

His funeral mass was held at St. Edward's Church, on Monday, July 24, 2006.

He was inducted into the East High School Hall of Fame in 1992 and was inducted into the Curbstone Coaches of Hall of Fame in 1997.
