= All-America Football Conference =

Professional American football league operating from 1946–1949

- Sport: American football
- Founded: 1944; 82 years ago
- First season: 1946
- Folded: 1949; 77 years ago
- No. of teams: 8
- Country: United States
- Last champion: Cleveland Browns (4)

The All-America Football Conference (AAFC) was a major professional American football league that challenged the established National Football League (NFL) from 1946 to 1949. One of the NFL's most formidable challengers, the AAFC attracted many of the nation's best players, and introduced many lasting innovations to the game. However, the AAFC was ultimately unable to sustain itself in competition with the NFL. After it folded, three of its teams were admitted to the NFL: the San Francisco 49ers, the Cleveland Browns and the original Baltimore Colts (not to be confused with the later Baltimore Colts, now the Indianapolis Colts).

The AAFC was the second American professional football league (the first being the third American Football League of 1940–1941) to have its teams play in a double round robin format in the regular season: each team had a home game and an away game with each of the other AAFC teams.

The Cleveland Browns were the AAFC's most successful club, winning every annual championship in the league's four years of operation.

== Founding ==
The AAFC was founded by Chicago Tribune sports editor Arch Ward on June 4, 1944. Ward was also the originator of baseball's All-Star Game and football's College All-Star Game. Ward brought together a number of wealthy pro football enthusiasts, some of whom had previously attempted to purchase NFL franchises. Ward had previously encouraged the NFL to expand, but now he hoped to bring about a permanent second league and a championship game with the NFL, similar to baseball's World Series.

The idea was not originated in vacuum, as two additional upstart leagues were trying to challenge the NFL in 1944:

- United States Football League - the (first) USFL, with Red Grange as the league commissioner, announced teams in eight cities: Akron, Baltimore, Boston, Chicago, Honolulu, New York, Philadelphia and Washington. The league faded away after failing to attract major investors or sign players, as Grange claimed they were "holding out for between $400 and $600 a game when they used to get $150". The league folded altogether on June 4, 1945, after Grange's resignation.
- Trans-America Football League - the TAFL had plans for franchises in Baltimore, Boston, Dallas, Denver, Houston, Los Angeles, Miami, New York and Philadelphia (Atlanta and New Orleans were also in the mix, but ruled out early), with a unique ownership model as only a group of five or more people could own a franchise (not a single owner). On January 5, 1945, they announced a six team league in Baltimore, Brooklyn, Dallas, Los Angeles, New York and Philadelphia, which had leased stadiums. The league folded on the same day as the USFL (June 4, 1945), after failing to secure a lease to Yankee Stadium.

On November 21, 1944, the AAFC chose James "Sleepy Jim" Crowley, one of the "Four Horsemen of Notre Dame", as its commissioner. Not coincidentally, the NFL commissioner at this time was Elmer Layden, another member of Knute Rockne's legendary 1924 "Fighting Irish" backfield at the University of Notre Dame.

During the next months, the AAFC's plans solidified. The league initially issued franchises for Buffalo, Chicago, Cleveland, Los Angeles, New York, and San Francisco. Brooklyn and Miami were later added. A group representing Baltimore was considered for admission, but could not secure use of Baltimore's stadium. The league planned to begin to play in 1945, but postponed its opening for a year as World War II continued.

As the eight franchises built their teams, no move was more far-reaching than Cleveland's choice of Paul Brown as its head coach. Brown had won six Ohio state championships in nine years at Massillon High School and the 1942 national championship at Ohio State, and had also coached successfully at the military's Naval Station Great Lakes. As coach of the new Cleveland franchise, Brown would become one of American football's greatest innovators and eventually have the team named for him.

== NFL reaction ==
As might be expected, the NFL did not welcome its new rival. In 1945, Layden remarked that the AAFC, still a year from its first game, should "first get a ball, then make a schedule, and then play a game". This insult, often paraphrased as "tell them to get a ball first", would be long remembered.

Washington Redskins owner George Preston Marshall was perhaps the NFL's hardest-liner regarding the AAFC. In 1945, he commented: "I did not realize there was another league, although I did receive some literature telling about a WPA project". Later he declared, "the worst team in our league could beat the best team in theirs". After the AAFC put a team in Baltimore, Marshall's opposition to it would be a major obstacle to interleague peace. Not coincidentally, his team was badly hurt by the AAFC. A top team from 1936 to 1945, the Redskins began a decades-long title drought after coach Ray Flaherty and many key players defected in 1946.

Layden's successor, Bert Bell, pursued a policy of official non-recognition, generally answering "no comment" to queries about the other league. In 1947, Pro Football Illustrated previewed both leagues in its annual publication and was banned from NFL stadiums.

== Competition ==
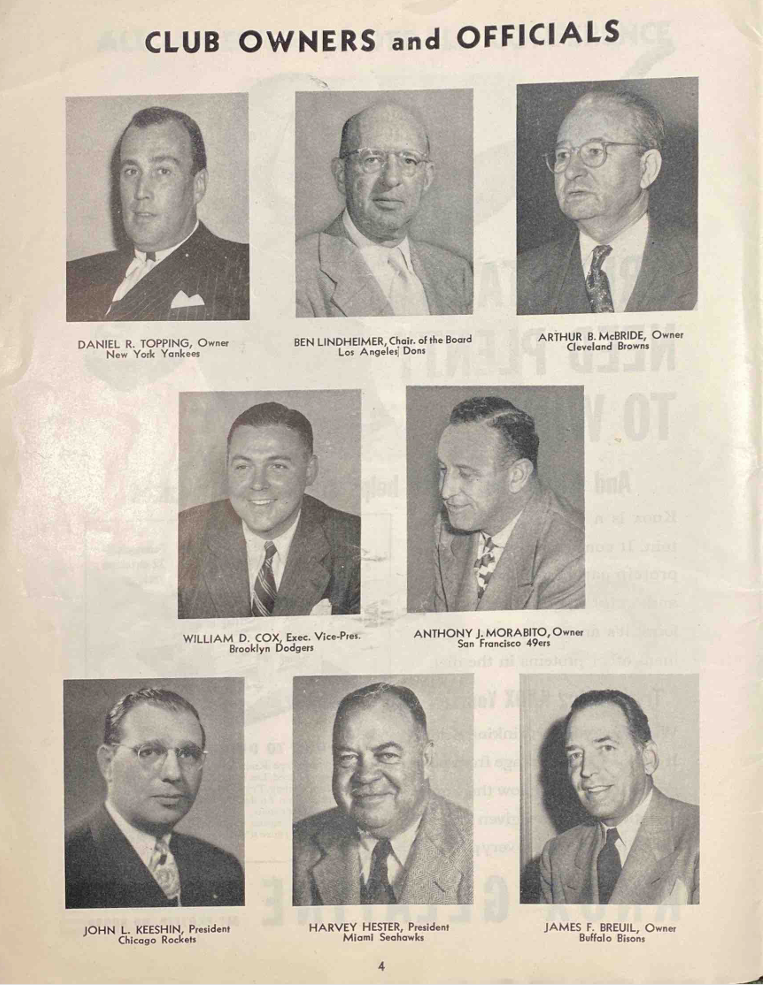
The original eight team owners of the AAFC in 1946.

The AAFC posed a formidable challenge. In most interleague sports wars, the established league had major advantages over the challenger in prestige, finance, size, and public awareness. The NFL-AAFC war differed in several respects.

The NFL was just emerging from its wartime retrenchment. The Cleveland Rams had suspended operations for 1943, and on three occasions teams merged for a season. The Boston Yanks had played only one season as an independent entity.

Meanwhile, the AAFC had advantages not enjoyed by many challengers:

- The AAFC was founded by a key figure at a major newspaper, so it enjoyed ample attention in the press.
- The AAFC owners (dubbed "the millionaires' coffee klatch") were wealthier than their NFL counterparts. Among them were Cleveland's Arthur B "Mickey" McBride (a real estate and taxi magnate), San Francisco's Anthony Morabito (lumber), Chicago's John L. Keeshin (trucking), and Los Angeles’ group of racetrack owner Benjamin Lindheimer, actor Don Ameche and MGM's Louis B. Mayer. The NFL owners were generally men whose primary assets were their teams.
- Peace produced a surplus of talent and an opening for a new league, as many pro and college players (some of whom had played on military teams) returned to civilian life. Many college-eligible players were signable despite longstanding tradition because their original classes had graduated. The AAFC took its share: its 1946 rosters included 40 of the 66 College All-Stars, two recent Heisman Trophy winners (Frank Sinkwich and Angelo Bertelli), and more than 100 players with NFL experience.
- Air travel was now viable. Like Major League Baseball, all NFL teams still played in the Northeast and Midwest, but the AAFC seized the opportunity to place teams in open cities in Florida and California.

Yet it remained to be seen if there was a market for this much pro football. Since achieving stability in the early 1930s, the NFL had never fielded more than 10 teams. No competitor had endured for more than two years. In 1946, there would be 18 teams, including three in Chicago, three in New York, and two in Los Angeles.

Baseball and college football were substantially more popular. Longtime NFL president Joe Carr had said, "No owner has made money from pro football, but a lot have gone broke thinking they could." At a time when the World Series had long been a national institution, and the Rose Bowl drew crowds of 90,000, the NFL's title game typically drew about 35,000 fans. Across the U.S., a growing number of college stadiums designed or retrofitted for football were being built and expanded across the U.S. Most pro football teams in contrast shared stadiums (and sometimes names) with the local baseball team, and as such had to make do in facilities designed for another sport with mediocre sight lines for football. Both leagues saw fit to choose college football legends as their commissioners.

There was even a sense that collegians could defeat pros. 1946 saw the famous Army–Notre Dame scoreless tie in Yankee Stadium. At season's end, Arch Ward (the AAFC founder) opined that both teams were superior to either pro champion.

It was in this landscape that the AAFC prepared to compete with the NFL.

=== Maneuvers and intrigue ===
Dan Topping, owner of the NFL's Brooklyn Tigers, wished to move his team from Ebbets Field to the much larger Yankee Stadium. New York Giants owner Tim Mara used his territorial rights to block the move. He had good reason: the Yankees had displaced the Giants as New York's premier baseball team after moving into The House That Ruth Built, three rival football leagues had planted teams there hoping to duplicate that feat, and Topping (of Anaconda Copper) was significantly wealthier than Mara.

Topping responded by buying into the baseball Yankees and transferring his football club to the AAFC. Most of his players followed. His renamed New York Yankees were rewarded with $100,000 from each of the other seven AAFC teams while the AAFC's initial New York investor withdrew. (Note that the AAFC Brooklyn Dodgers were a separate entity never associated with Topping's team.)

Shortly after Topping defected, the NFL owners fired Commissioner Layden, replacing him with Pittsburgh Steelers co-owner Bert Bell. Bell had already made a major contribution to the league: the NFL draft, begun in 1936, was his idea.

Meanwhile, Dan Reeves' Cleveland Rams had consistently lost money, despite winning the 1945 NFL title. Compounding his problems, the local AAFC competition already looked strong: Arthur McBride was aggressively marketing the Browns, and coach Paul Brown was an Ohio icon. Accordingly, Reeves proposed to move the Rams to Los Angeles.

With two teams planned for California, the AAFC had national aspirations. The NFL's thinking was more modest: it rejected Reeves' move because of travel expenses. After the NFL refused to consider his second choice (Dallas), Reeves threatened to move his team to the AAFC. Having already lost Topping, the NFL reconsidered and approved the Los Angeles move.

It was unprecedented for the NFL champion to move at all, let alone partly to avoid an unproven rival. On the other hand, the NFL would now face the AAFC as a national rather than regional league, and the AAFC would not have a West Coast monopoly.

Rather than hold a collegiate draft, Crowley encouraged his owners to sign as many good players as possible to compete with the NFL. However, this open market favored Paul Brown, who had built the most extensive recruitment network in all of football. He thus had a head start in signing top players coming out of the colleges and military. Years later, Crowley acknowledged this was a fatal mistake, as it planted the seeds for the Browns' near-total dominance of the league.

=== Initial alignment ===
For 1946, the AAFC began play with 8 teams playing a record 14 games (a double round-robin). The NFL's 10 teams played 11 games, its standard since 1937.

Again acting ambitiously, the AAFC chose stadiums larger than the NFL's in Chicago, New York, and Cleveland.

The two leagues’ franchises and home fields for 1946 were:

NFL

Eastern Division	Western Division
Boston Yanks (Fenway Park)	Chicago Bears (Wrigley Field)
New York Giants (Polo Grounds)	Chicago Cardinals (Comiskey Park)
Philadelphia Eagles (Shibe Park (Note: Later known as Connie Mack Stadium))	Detroit Lions (Briggs Stadium (Note: Later known as Tiger Stadium))
Pittsburgh Steelers (Forbes Field)	Green Bay Packers (City Stadium/Wisconsin State Fair Park)
Washington Redskins (Griffith Stadium)	Los Angeles Rams (Los Angeles Memorial Coliseum)

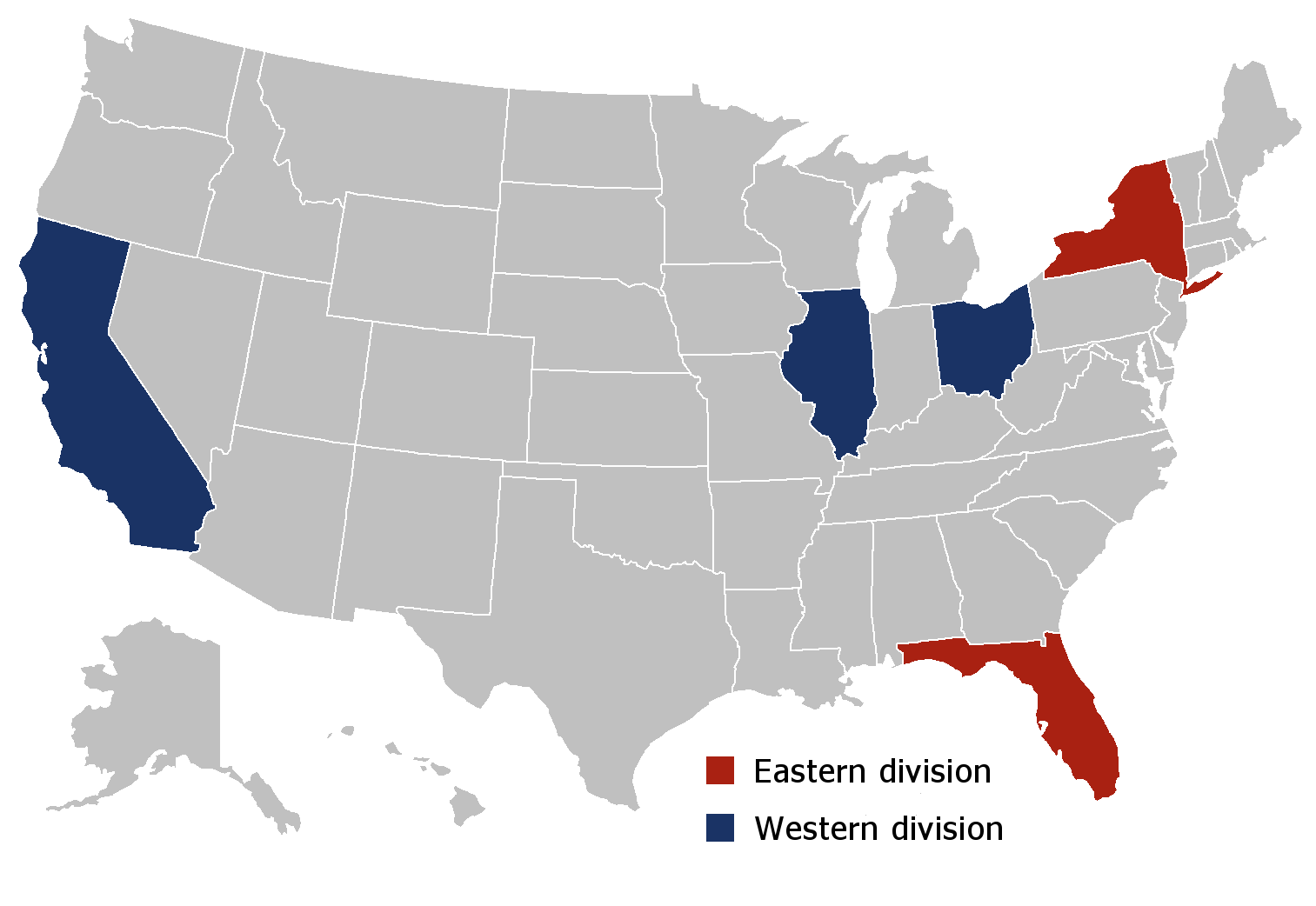
1946 season teams

AAFC

Eastern Division	Western Division
Brooklyn Dodgers (Ebbets Field)	Chicago Rockets (Soldier Field)
Buffalo Bisons (Civic Stadium (Note: Better remembered as War Memorial Stadium, the original home of the modern Buffalo Bills))	Cleveland Browns (Municipal Stadium)
Miami Seahawks (Burdine Stadium (Note: Later known as the Miami Orange Bowl))	Los Angeles Dons (Los Angeles Memorial Coliseum)
New York Yankees (Yankee Stadium)	San Francisco 49ers (Kezar Stadium)

=== 1946 ===
In the AAFC's first game, on September 6, 1946, the Cleveland Browns hosted the Miami Seahawks, winning 44–0 before a professional football record crowd of more than 60,000 fans. This historic game would prove a microcosm of much about the league:

- Largely thanks to Paul Brown's innovations in organization and coaching, the Browns were on their way to setting a new standard of pro football excellence.
- The other teams would have significant problems, but the Seahawks would become the AAFC's biggest fiasco. Along with two of their home games being postponed by hurricanes, they attracted poor home crowds en route to finishing last with a 3–11 record. These factors resulted in the Seahawks losing $350,000 for the year, and the AAFC shutting down the franchise after the season.
- The crowd was the first of many large gates that the AAFC's most popular teams (Cleveland, San Francisco, Los Angeles, and New York) would attract, surpassing the NFL.
- The score, however, was the first sign of the AAFC's greatest problem. The league would have a wide gap between its best and worst teams, and its standings would be remarkably consistent from year to year.
- Finally, this game marked the end of pro football's color line. The Browns' Marion Motley and Bill Willis, both future Hall of Famers, became the first black players to play pro football since 1933 (the NFL Rams, who had also signed two black players, UCLA great Kenny Washington and future actor Woody Strode, opened several weeks later). Notably, this was before Jackie Robinson's debut with the Brooklyn Dodgers, as Robinson was then playing for the Montreal Royals, the Dodgers' top farm team. In coming years, the AAFC would tap this talent pool more than the NFL, with 20 black players compared with the NFL's seven in 1949.

Other than New York, all of the quality teams were in the Western Division. In the West, Cleveland led with a 12–2 record, three games ahead of San Francisco, followed by Los Angeles and Chicago. In the East, New York was the only team to win more than three games, finishing 10–3–1. Brooklyn and Buffalo were seven games behind, followed by Miami. Despite Brooklyn's record, its tailback Glenn Dobbs led the league in passing and was named the MVP.

The title game was a tight affair, with the Browns coming from behind late in the fourth quarter to defeat the Yankees 14–9.

Despite the fiasco in Miami, the AAFC had enjoyed a successful debut, establishing a high level of play and doing well at the gate. The NFL likewise set attendance highs for both its season and title game. However, as salaries shot up with two leagues competing for players, the only teams to make a profit were the two champions, the Browns and the NFL Bears.

=== 1947 ===
The Chicago Rockets had experienced some disorganization in 1946. In a remarkable move, Commissioner Crowley (a successful former college coach) gave up a five-year contract to become their part-owner and coach. Admiral Jonas H. Ingram was named to replace him as commissioner.

To replace the Seahawks, the Baltimore group turned down in 1945 was issued a franchise. The new Baltimore Colts would play in Municipal Stadium. Meanwhile, the Bisons were renamed the Bills and the NFL added a 12th game to its schedule.

The AAFC enjoyed its most successful season in 1947. Some notable guests watched the Browns' opening game: the entire coaching staff of the 1946 NFL champion Chicago Bears. The 49ers obtained the rights to Army's legendary Heisman Trophy winners Felix Blanchard ("Mr. Inside") and Glenn Davis ("Mr. Outside"), and amid great publicity unsuccessfully attempted to get the military to permit them to play during their post-graduation furloughs. In other highlights, a Yankees–Dons game in the Los Angeles Coliseum drew a pro record of more than 82,000, and division leaders New York and Cleveland locked horns on November 23 in the most famous game in AAFC history. Before more than 70,000 fans at Yankee Stadium, the Browns rallied from a 28–0 deficit to tie 28–28.

New York won the East with an 11–2–1 record, 2½ games ahead of Buffalo, with Brooklyn and Baltimore far back. Cleveland, led by MVP quarterback Otto Graham, won the West with a 12–1–1 record, 3½ games ahead of San Francisco. Los Angeles followed, and Chicago was last at 1–13. Former Commissioner Crowley would not return either as coach or owner.

The title game was a defensive struggle, with the Browns again defeating the Yankees, 14–3.

By this time a pattern had emerged among the franchises. The Browns, Yankees, 49ers, Dons, and Bills all had stable ownership and at least one winning season. The Browns led both leagues in attendance by a wide margin, the Yankees and Dons outpaced their crosstown NFL rivals on the field and at the gate, and the 49ers and Bills (despite a small stadium) also enjoyed good attendance.

However, the Dodgers, Rockets, and to a lesser extent the Colts were having serious problems. Playing near the Yankees and the NFL Giants, the Dodgers drew fewer than 12,000 fans per game, least in both leagues. The Rockets faced the NFL's flagship Bears and a Cardinals team enjoying rare success. After a decent start in 1946, the Rockets collapsed on the field and found themselves playing before tens of thousands of empty seats in huge Soldier Field. The first-year Colts did reasonably well at the gate but finished last. All of these teams were at the bottom of the standings and all were sold after the 1947 season, the Rockets for the second time.

=== 1948 ===
Although 1947 had been a successful season for the AAFC in many respects, the league still lost money. In 1948, attendance in both leagues declined, and negotiations to end the war became serious.

One factor affecting AAFC attendance was the gap between the league's best and worst teams. To counter this, Commissioner Ingram attempted to get the strongest teams to distribute some players to the weakest. He was modestly successful: the Browns sent rookie quarterback Y. A. Tittle to the Colts, who enjoyed their first good season, and the Yankees were generous enough to fall into mediocrity. However, 1948 featured extremes despite Ingram's efforts.

For the first time, the division races were close. One featured excellence, the other mediocrity.

The 1948 AAFC draft was held on December 16, 1947, in New York City. Tony Minisi was the first overall selection. In the West, San Francisco and Cleveland both remained undefeated far into the season. On November 14, nearly 83,000 (a record) in Cleveland Municipal Stadium watched the 9–0 Browns win a 14–7 defensive struggle over the 10–0 49ers. They met again two weeks later in San Francisco, with the Browns now 12–0 and the 49ers 11–1. The Browns again won narrowly, this time 31–28, clinching first place.

The rematch concluded an AAFC Thanksgiving week promotion: the Browns played three games in eight days. New Dodgers' part-owner Branch Rickey (of baseball fame) suggested this experiment, and the Browns were chosen as the guinea pigs. They survived unscathed, and went on to complete an unprecedented 14–0 regular season.

The 49ers finished a heartbreaking second (and out of the postseason) at 12–2. Los Angeles followed at 7–7, and Chicago again finished last at 1–13. The quarterbacks of the two outstanding teams, Cleveland's Otto Graham and San Francisco's Frankie Albert, shared the MVP.

In the East, Buffalo and Baltimore tied at a mediocre 7–7, just ahead of 6–8 New York. Brooklyn was last at 2–12. Buffalo won a playoff and the dubious privilege of meeting Cleveland for the title.

Cleveland won the title in a predictable rout, 49–7. With pro football's second perfect season (after the 1937 Los Angeles Bulldogs of the second American Football League) and an 18-game winning streak and a 29-game unbeaten streak in progress, the Browns were making history. Since then, only the 1972 Miami Dolphins team managed to win its league championship with an unblemished record. The Pro Football Hall of Fame recognizes the Browns' latter streak as the longest in the history of professional football.

The NFL also had a problem with imbalance. With one exception, every title game from 1933 to 1946 featured either the Giants or Redskins from the East against either the Bears or Packers from the West. The lone exception was 1935, when the Detroit Lions played in the title game against the Giants.

But in the late 1940s new powers rose in the NFL, as the Cardinals, Eagles, and Rams all won titles, and the Steelers reached a playoff. All these teams had long histories of futility and had merged or suspended operations during the war. (In fact, the Cardinals were winless from mid-1942 to mid-1945, including a 0–10 merged season with the Steelers.)

Adding to the drama, the division races were often tight. Decades before Pete Rozelle, Bert Bell promoted parity by purposely matching strong teams early in the season, keeping them from getting far ahead in the standings. All this contrasted sharply with the AAFC.

The war was getting increasingly costly thanks to rising salaries and dropping attendance. Nearly every team in both leagues lost money – enough that in December, the NFL officially acknowledged the AAFC as peace talks almost succeeded in ending the war. However, the AAFC wanted four of its teams to be admitted into the NFL, while the NFL was willing to admit only the Browns and 49ers. Although the survival of its Brooklyn and Chicago teams was now in doubt, the AAFC decided to continue the fight.

=== Realignment ===
Commissioner Ingram stepped down, and another admiral, Oliver O. Kessing, was named Commissioner.

As the war entered its fourth season, financial problems forced reorganization in both leagues. The Dodgers, the AAFC's least-drawing team, merged with the Yankees as the Rockets (renamed the Hornets) and Colts continued their streaks of annual ownership changes.

In the NFL, the champion Philadelphia Eagles lost money and were sold. Plagued by league-low attendance, the Boston Yanks moved to New York in a curious move. Yanks owner Ted Collins had long desired a franchise in Yankee Stadium (thus his team's name), and expected the AAFC and its Yankees to be gone in 1949. Instead, with Yankee Stadium and the Yanks name unavailable, Collins' renamed Bulldogs had to share the Polo Grounds with the Giants on unfavorable terms and compete with two superior rivals.

With the AAFC now down to seven teams, it realigned into one division, reduced its schedule to 12 games (still a double round-robin), and changed its postseason to a Shaughnessy playoff. In 1948, the 12–2 49ers had stayed home while the 7–7 Bills played for the title. This would not reoccur, as now the top four teams would qualify for the playoffs. Also, for the first time in pro football, playoff home-field advantage would be based on win–loss record rather than rotating between divisions.

The lineup of the rival leagues was now:

NFL

Eastern Division	Western Division
New York Bulldogs (Polo Grounds)	Chicago Bears (Wrigley Field)
New York Giants (Polo Grounds)	Chicago Cardinals (Comiskey Park)
Philadelphia Eagles (Shibe Park)	Detroit Lions (Briggs Stadium)
Pittsburgh Steelers (Forbes Field)	Green Bay Packers (City Stadium)
Washington Redskins (Griffith Stadium)	Los Angeles Rams (Los Angeles Coliseum)

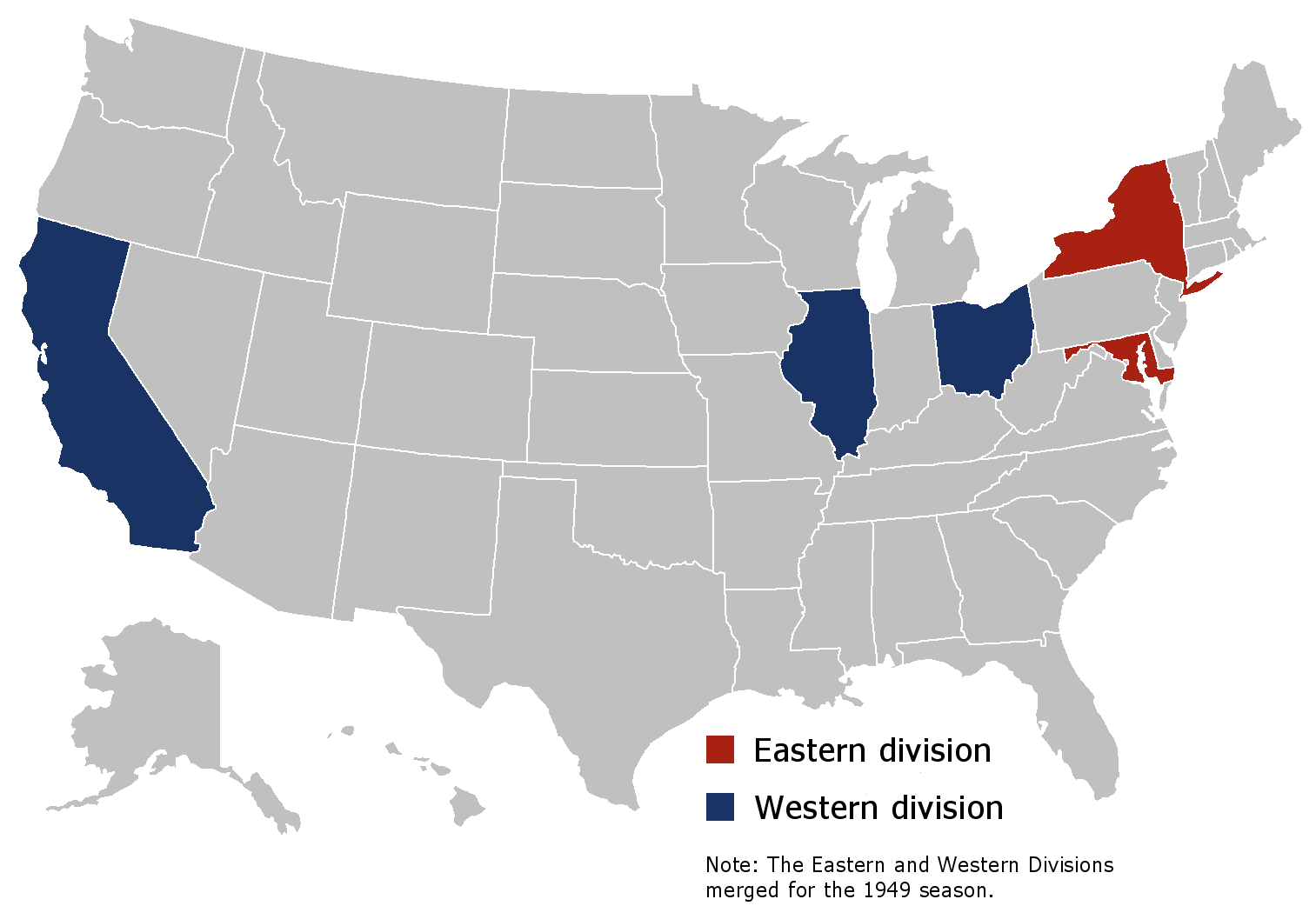
1947–1949 season teams

AAFC

Division
Baltimore Colts (Municipal Stadium)
Brooklyn–New York Yankees (Yankee Stadium)
Buffalo Bills (Civic Stadium)
Chicago Hornets (Soldier Field)
Cleveland Browns (Municipal Stadium)
Los Angeles Dons (Los Angeles Coliseum)
San Francisco 49ers (Kezar Stadium)

=== 1949 ===
Since 1934, the College All-Star Game had matched the defending NFL champions against an all-star team of recent college graduates. The game was a major event, as Rose Bowl-sized crowds (more than 105,000 in 1947) watched college football's best often hold their own with the pros. Held in late August at Soldier Field, the game was sponsored by the Chicago Tribune—whose sports editor, Ward, had founded the AAFC.

After the game's contract with the NFL expired with the 1948 game, Ward refused to renew it. He attempted to help the AAFC by putting its champion into the prestigious game. However, the NFL was able to convince the Tribune's board to override Ward and force him to re-sign with the NFL, handing the AAFC an embarrassing defeat.

Red ink on both sides continued to flow. The Colts and Hornets were only kept afloat when Dons owner Ben Lindheimer subsidized them. The Green Bay Packers, then as now owned by a local civic group, had to issue new stock to remain solvent. Now facing two cross-town rivals, the Bulldogs predictably had even lower attendance in New York than in Boston. The Pittsburgh Steelers and Detroit Lions were also having serious financial problems.

Remarkably, the AAFC actually enjoyed better attendance than the NFL over its four-year run. In an era when sports teams were wholly dependent on gate receipts to remain in business, and when revenues from sources such as media rights were negligible, this had the potential to put the AAFC on essentially an equal financial footing. However, the NFL had a critical advantage in that its ownership was deeply committed to ensuring the survival of their teams. In contrast, it was becoming clear that the AAFC's better-financed owners, who were accustomed to operating profitable businesses, as opposed to underwriting expenses year after year, were not willing to absorb losses indefinitely.

On the field, Cleveland finally showed some vulnerability. An opening day tie with the Bills ended their winning streak, and on October 9 the 49ers ended their unbeaten streak in a 56–28 upset to move into first place.

Things soon reverted to form, however. The Browns won the rematch with the 49ers 30–28; and Cleveland (9–1–2) and San Francisco (9–3) finished one-two for the fourth consecutive year. Brooklyn–New York and Buffalo were the other playoff qualifiers, followed by Chicago and Los Angeles. Baltimore finished far behind at 1–11.

In playoff action, Cleveland defeated Buffalo 31–21 and San Francisco defeated Brooklyn–New York 17–7. The two best teams in AAFC history met at last with the title at stake, with the Browns winning the final title 21–7. No MVP was named for this season.

The Browns now owned a 52–4–3 record and all four AAFC titles.

=== Merger ===
On December 9, 1949, two days before the AAFC title game, the two leagues made peace. Three AAFC teams were admitted to the NFL: the Browns, 49ers, and Colts. The Dons merged with the Rams, while the Bills, Yankees, and Hornets folded. The enlarged league was renamed the National–American Football League.

The Browns and 49ers, as the AAFC's two strongest teams, were obvious choices. San Francisco was also a natural fit as a potential geographic rival to the Rams, who were alone on the West Coast at the time.

The third choice was the subject of some debate. There was some sentiment to admit the Bills rather than the Colts. The Bills had better attendance despite only making the playoffs twice, and had much wealthier ownership. However, Buffalo's size (only Green Bay was smaller) and climate were seen as problems. While Redskins owner George Preston Marshall had long objected to the Colts' proximity to Washington, he ultimately decided that the Colts would be a natural rival to the Redskins. He agreed to accept a $150,000 fee to waive his territorial rights.

Buffalo fans petitioned the NFL to admit the Bills as well. The league, realizing the pitfalls of having an uneven 13-team league, held a vote on admitting the Bills. While a majority of owners (including the Browns, 49ers, and Colts) were willing to take the Bills, the final vote was only 9–4 in favor. League rules of the time required a unanimous vote to admit a new team. Buffalo owner Jim Breuil was content to accept a minority stake in the Browns. Breuil even rebuffed an offer from the next-best pro league in the nation at the time, the minor-league American Football League of the late 1940s, to join their league.

The Yankees' players were divided between the Giants (who chose six players) and Bulldogs (who received the rest). Three Bills players were awarded to the Browns. The remaining Bills, Dons, and Hornets entered a dispersal draft.

With the AAFC Yankees gone, Bulldogs owner Ted Collins was free to rename his team "Yanks" and move into Yankee Stadium. He continued to lose money, however, and sold the team after two seasons to Dallas-based interests, who relocated the team to Dallas and called the team the Dallas Texans.

The word "American" did not remain in the enlarged league's name for long; it was dropped in March 1950. Although "National" and "American" became the names of the league's new conferences, within three years the conferences were renamed Eastern and Western. It was not until the AFL–NFL merger twenty years later that the "American" and "National" conference names were restored.

The enlarged NFL was aligned as follows:

American (Eastern) Conference	National (Western) Conference
Chicago Cardinals (Comiskey Park)	Baltimore Colts (Municipal Stadium)
Cleveland Browns (Municipal Stadium)	Chicago Bears (Wrigley Field)
New York Giants (Polo Grounds)	Detroit Lions (Briggs Stadium)
Philadelphia Eagles (Shibe Park)	Green Bay Packers (City Stadium)
Pittsburgh Steelers (Forbes Field)	Los Angeles Rams (Los Angeles Coliseum)
Washington Redskins (Griffith Stadium)	New York Yanks (Yankee Stadium)
	San Francisco 49ers (Kezar Stadium)

NFL teams: West, East
AAFC teams: Defunct, Absorbed into the NFL
The cities of Chicago, Los Angeles, and New York all had both NFL and AAFC teams, of which all of the AAFC teams went defunct

With two exceptions, this was the NFL's alignment for the rest of the 1950s.

Admitting Baltimore over Buffalo proved to be a mistake, as the AAFC's Colts folded after one season in the NFL, bringing the league back to an even 12 teams. However, the aforementioned Dallas Texans also folded after only one season, and a replacement team, also named the Colts, acquired its assets and joined the league as an expansion team in 1953. Meanwhile, the popularity of the original Bills franchise prompted former Detroit Lions minority owner Ralph Wilson to adopt the name "Buffalo Bills" for his American Football League franchise ten years after the AAFC dissolved. Both the replacement Colts (now based in Indianapolis) and the replacement Bills are still playing in the NFL, though neither maintains official ties to their namesakes (coincidentally, the Colts and Bills were division rivals in the AFC East from 1970 through 2001, after which the Colts moved to the AFC South).

== Aftermath ==
=== "The World Series of Pro Football" ===
After winning each of their titles, the Browns challenged the NFL champion to an interleague championship. Each year the NFL refused. (Of course, by playing such a game the NFL would legitimize the AAFC and risk more prestige.)

In December 1949, with both leagues financially exhausted but now at peace, a profitable interleague playoff was now both possible and desirable. Although Pittsburgh's Art Rooney, whose Steelers were among the shakiest NFL franchises, publicly advocated such a game, most of the NFL was unwilling to risk defeat at the hands of their vanquished, supposedly inferior rival. Officially, however, commissioner Bert Bell maintained that the NFL constitution barred such a game. The football world would have to wait to see how the Browns matched up against the NFL's best.

All would not be lost for fans, however. Bell appreciated that the Browns were now an important asset to the NFL, and scheduled a special Saturday night game between them and the NFL's two-time champion Philadelphia Eagles to open the 1950 season. While not quite an unofficial interleague playoff, what took place on September 16, 1950, was no ordinary regular season game.

The defending champions of two leagues that had never met on the field were about to play, foreshadowing tensions present in the early Super Bowls of the 1960s. At last the Browns would have the chance to prove themselves, and by extension the AAFC, against the NFL. There was tremendous anticipation from fans and the press, which called the game "The World Series of Pro Football". Although the game was played in Philadelphia, it was not played on the Eagles usual home field: because of the huge crowd expected, the game was moved from Shibe Park to Philadelphia Municipal Stadium, site of the Army–Navy Game. Attendance was a whopping 71,237, the third-largest pro football crowd to that date (next to two crowds for Rams games at the Los Angeles Memorial Coliseum the year before), and the largest-ever on the east coast. (This figure also surpassed every previous NFL or AAFC title game, as well as Super Bowl I.) There was even a most valuable player award, unheard of for a regular-season game.

The Eagles were widely considered one of the NFL's strongest-ever champions, while many discounted the Browns’ success in their "inferior" league. The result was therefore shocking: the Eagles underestimated the highly motivated Browns (coach Greasy Neale did not even scout the Browns’ preseason games), while Paul Brown found some previously unknown weaknesses in the widely imitated "Eagle Defense" that allowed the Browns to run up 487 yards of total offense. The Browns led 14–3 at halftime and dominated the rest of the game to win decisively, 35–10. Quarterback Otto Graham was named the game's MVP.

=== The Browns, 49ers, and Colts in the NFL ===
The Browns went 10–2 to finish in a first-place tie with the New York Giants, then won a playoff 8–3 to qualify for the 1950 NFL championship game. Their opponent was a formidable Los Angeles Rams team that averaged nearly 39 points per game, a record that still stands. (Ironically, this was the Rams’ first game in Cleveland since winning the 1945 title as the Cleveland Rams.) In a classic seesaw game, the Browns prevailed on a last-minute field goal, 30–28, to win their fifth consecutive league title.

The Browns’ 1950 season confirmed the quality of their AAFC achievements as nothing else could. After the title game, Commissioner Bell called the Browns "the greatest team to ever play football."

Cleveland remained near the top of the NFL for years, although in 1951 they were finally denied a league title (by the Rams). The Browns played in every NFL title game from 1950 to 1955, winning three of them, for a grand total of seven league titles in ten years.

The other ex-AAFC teams did not fare nearly as well.

The 49ers, the AAFC's second-best team, struggled in 1950 and finished 3–9. However, starting the next year they emerged as one of the better teams in the NFL's Western Conference, reaching the postseason in 1957 after some near-misses.

The Colts' prospects were not promising: they had finished 1–11 and last in the AAFC in 1949 and also faced the handicap of playing near the Washington Redskins. In 1950, the Colts went 1–11 again and disbanded. Their legacy lived on, however: three years later, a new Baltimore Colts franchise team was established after the Dallas Texans folded and the Colts became one of the NFL's storied teams. Although the Colts would controversially move to Indianapolis, on March 29, 1984, the NFL would return to Baltimore for the 1996 NFL season in the form of the Baltimore Ravens. From an organizational perspective, the Ravens are a continuation of the pre-1996 Browns, who played in Cleveland until they controversially agreed to move to Baltimore for the 1996 NFL season. Officially, the NFL considers the "expansion" Browns (1999 on) to be one continuous franchise from the original 1946 AAFC team, with it having suspended operations from 1996 to 1998, while the Ravens are considered to have been established in 1996. While the pre-1984 history of the Colts officially remains with the Indianapolis franchise, the Ravens have also recognized it in a number of ways.

See Cleveland Browns, San Francisco 49ers, Baltimore Colts (1947–50), and Indianapolis Colts for further details of these teams' subsequent histories.

=== The AAFC and the NFL record book ===
One notable difference between the All-America Football Conference and the American Football League (AFL), which merged with the NFL two decades later, is that the records and statistics of AAFC players and teams were not included in the NFL record book for many years, while those of their AFL counterparts were. For example, Joe Namath's pre-1970 statistics with the AFL New York Jets have long been considered official NFL statistics, while Y. A. Tittle's pre-1950 statistics with the AAFC Baltimore Colts were not.

According to the NFL, this was because official scoresheets of AAFC games were not made available to the NFL after the merger. Without these, the NFL could not verify the authenticity of any AAFC statistics or records, and so it chose to ignore them. However, in the case of the AFL–NFL merger, which was completed in 1970, the AFL gave all of its official scoresheets to the NFL, making it possible for the NFL to accept the AFL's statistics and records.

Another explanation is that unlike the NFL–AFL agreement, the NFL–AAFC agreement was not a merger between equals: only three of the seven AAFC teams were admitted to the NFL, there was no interleague playoff in December 1949, and "American" swiftly disappeared from the enlarged league's name. In contrast, the AFL was able to force the NFL to admit all of its teams, to play an interleague championship game on a neutral field (retroactively known as Super Bowl I), and to maintain the "American" name in the form of the American Football Conference.

A push to have AAFC statistics officially recognized by the NFL started in 2019, but stalled for a number of years. On April 1, 2025, NFL owners approved a proposal from the Competition Committee to officially recognize AAFC records, spanning player, coach, and team statistics. Incorporating AAFC records credited longtime Cleveland Browns head coach Paul Brown with an additional 52 regular-season and playoff wins, as recognized by the NFL.

Historically, the Pro Football Hall of Fame did recognize AAFC statistics.

== Legacy ==
Although the AAFC played only four years, it had a major, lasting impact on pro football. Of all the leagues that challenged the NFL, only the American Football League of the 1960s influenced the NFL more than the AAFC. The AAFC put the first pro football teams in Baltimore, Los Angeles, San Francisco, and Miami. Indeed, the AAFC was a coast-to-coast league more than a decade before Major League Baseball. This brought about another innovation: AAFC teams traveled by air while NFL teams still traveled by train. The Cleveland Browns, San Francisco 49ers, and original Baltimore Colts began in the AAFC, while sixteen AAFC alumni are enshrined in the Pro Football Hall of Fame.

The AAFC played a 14-game schedule more than a decade before the NFL, and played a major role in popularizing zone defenses in pro football.

Black players were excluded from the NFL from 1934 to 1945. The AAFC helped reintegrate professional American football in 1946 when Cleveland signed Marion Motley and Bill Willis. The NFL Rams, having been driven out of Cleveland by the AAFC Browns, signed Kenny Washington and Woody Strode only after the venue they sought to play in, the Los Angeles Coliseum, enforced its policy of integration. Through its poaching of NFL official (and former player-coaching star) Tommy Hughitt, the AAFC took an explicitly anti-racist stance toward rough play, aggressively penalizing racist unsportsmanlike conduct. Motley credited this, along with the AAFC fans' embrace of black talent in the league, with helping to establish the legitimacy of integrated professional football.

The AAFC's Paul Brown produced numerous innovations to the game on and off the field. Among them were year-round coaching staffs, precision pass patterns, the face mask, and the practice of coaches’ calling plays via "messenger guards". He also was the first coach to have his staff film the opposition and have his team break down those game films in a classroom setting. In fact, the classroom setting and chalkboard analysis can also be attributed to him. His success with the Browns forced the rest of both leagues to adopt his methods. Many of his players and assistants eventually coached champions. Brown declined efforts to draft him to succeed Bert Bell as NFL commissioner, later founded the American Football League's Cincinnati Bengals, and later served on the NFL's key Competition Committee until his death in 1991.

These innovations and personalities helped lay the initial groundwork for professional football's great success.

The merger would also benefit the Pittsburgh Steelers. One of the NFL's shakiest franchises financially prior to the merger, the addition of the Browns would help form a rivalry due to the close proximity of Cleveland and Pittsburgh that would be cut to two hours driving time by the time the Ohio Turnpike and the western extension of the Pennsylvania Turnpike were completed by the mid-1950s, allowing fans of both teams to attend each other's away games. While the Steelers would largely remain non-competitive until their 1970s dominance, the rivalry with the Browns along with their existing rivalry with the Eagles would help stabilize the team's finances.

== Standings ==
W = Wins, L = Losses, T = Ties

=== 1946 ===
AAFC Eastern Division
	W	L	T	PCT	DIV	PF	PA	STK
New York Yankees	10	3	1	.769	6–0	270	192	W2
Buffalo Bisons	3	10	1	.231	1–5	249	370	L3
Brooklyn Dodgers	3	10	1	.231	2–4	226	339	L6
Miami Seahawks	3	11	0	.214	3–3	167	378	W1

Note: Tie games were not officially counted in the standings.

AAFC Western Division
	W	L	T	PCT	DIV	PF	PA	STK
Cleveland Browns	12	2	0	.857	4–2	423	137	W5
San Francisco 49ers	9	5	0	.643	4–2	307	189	W3
Los Angeles Dons	7	5	2	.583	2–3–1	305	290	T1
Chicago Rockets	5	6	3	.455	1–4–1	263	315	T1

Note: Tie games were not officially counted in the standings.

AAFC Championship: Cleveland 14, New York 9 (December 22 @ Cleveland)

=== 1947 ===
AAFC Eastern Division
	W	L	T	PCT	DIV	PF	PA	STK
New York Yankees	11	2	1	.846	5–1	378	239	W2
Buffalo Bills	8	4	2	.667	4–1–1	320	288	T1
Brooklyn Dodgers	3	10	1	.231	1–4–1	181	340	L3
Baltimore Colts	2	11	1	.154	1–5	167	377	L1

Note: Tie games were not officially counted in the standings.

AAFC Western Division
	W	L	T	PCT	DIV	PF	PA	STK
Cleveland Browns	12	1	1	.923	5–1	410	185	W2
San Francisco 49ers	8	4	2	.667	4–2	327	264	T1
Los Angeles Dons	7	7	0	.500	3–3	328	256	W1
Chicago Rockets	1	13	0	.071	0–6	263	425	L3

Note: Tie games were not officially counted in the standings.

AAFC Championship: Cleveland 14, New York 3 (December 14 @ New York)

=== 1948 ===
AAFC Eastern Division
	W	L	T	PCT	DIV	PF	PA	STK
Buffalo Bills	7	7	0	.500	4–2	360	358	L1
Baltimore Colts	7	7	0	.500	5–1	333	327	W2
New York Yankees	6	8	0	.429	3–3	265	301	W1
Brooklyn Dodgers	2	12	0	.143	0–6	253	387	L6

Note: Tie games were not officially counted in the standings.

AAFC Western Division
	W	L	T	PCT	DIV	PF	PA	STK
Cleveland Browns	14	0	0	1.000	6–0	389	190	W14
San Francisco 49ers	12	2	0	.857	4–2	495	248	W1
Los Angeles Dons	7	7	0	.500	2–4	258	305	L2
Chicago Rockets	1	13	0	.071	0–6	202	439	L11

Note: Tie games were not officially counted in the standings.

Eastern Division playoff: Buffalo 28, Baltimore 17 (December 12 @ Baltimore)

AAFC Championship: Cleveland 49, Buffalo 7 (December 19 @ Cleveland)

=== 1949 ===
AAFC standings
	W	L	T	PCT	PF	PA	STK
Cleveland Browns	9	1	2	.900	339	171	W2
San Francisco 49ers	9	3	0	.750	416	227	W3
New York Yankees	8	4	0	.667	196	206	L1
Buffalo Bills	5	5	2	.500	236	256	W2
Los Angeles Dons	4	8	0	.333	253	322	L1
Chicago Hornets	4	8	0	.333	179	268	L5
Baltimore Colts	1	11	0	.083	172	341	L6

Note: Tie games were not officially counted in the standings.

Semifinal #1: Cleveland 31, Buffalo 21 (December 4 @ Cleveland)

Semifinal #2: San Francisco 17, Brooklyn/New York 7 (December 4 @ San Francisco)

AAFC Championship: Cleveland 21, San Francisco 7 (December 11 @ Cleveland)

== All-time standings ==
Franchises are ranked by win percentage. As was the custom for professional football leagues in the 1940s, ties were not considered for the purpose of standings.

Team	W	L	T	Pct.	PF	PA	Status	Colors '46	Colors '47	Colors '48	Colors '49
Cleveland Browns	47	4	3	.922	1561	683	Accepted into the NFL before the 1950 season. Ended up in a relocation controversy years later.				
San Francisco 49ers	38	14	2	.717	1597	928	Accepted into the NFL before the 1950 season.				
New York Yankees	27	13	2	.675	913	732	Merged with the Brooklyn Dodgers for the 1949 season.				-
Brooklyn Dodgers	8	32	2	.200	660	1066	Merged with the New York Yankees for the 1949 season.				-
Brooklyn/New York Yankees	8	4	0	.667	196	206	Played in the 1949 season and then folded. The players were divided between the New York Giants and New York Bulldogs, the latter played as the New York Yanks starting in 1950.	-	-	-	
Los Angeles Dons	25	27	2	.481	1066	1119	Folded at the end of the 1949 season.				
Buffalo Bills	23	26	5	.469	1165	1272	Originally called the Bisons during the 1946 season. Renamed the Bills at the start of the 1947 season. Folded in 1949. Another team named the Bills was founded in 1960, as a charter member of the AFL, and now plays in the NFL.				
Chicago Rockets	11	40	3	.216	971	1501	Renamed the Hornets for the 1949 season and then folded.				
Miami Seahawks	3	11	0	.214	167	378	Went bankrupt at the end of the 1946 season and were rebranded as the Baltimore Colts. The Seahawks nickname is currently in use in the NFL by another unrelated team founded in 1976.		-	-	-
Baltimore Colts	10	29	1	.256	672	1049	Reorganized from the remains of the Miami Seahawks. Accepted into the NFL before the 1950 season and then folded after one season. Another NFL team would, in 1953, pick up the Baltimore Colts name, and now plays in Indianapolis.	-			

- Team colors are compiled from the Gridiron Uniform Database

== Postseason games ==
=== Championship games ===
From 1946 to 1948 the champions of each division met in the AAFC championship game. In 1949, there was only one seven-team division, so the championship game was the final round of a four team tournament.

Year	Date	Winning Team	Score	Losing Team	Location	Attendance
1946	December 22	Cleveland Browns	14–9	New York Yankees	Cleveland Municipal Stadium	41,181
1947	December 14	Cleveland Browns	14–3	New York Yankees	Yankee Stadium	60,103
1948	December 19	Cleveland Browns	49–7	Buffalo Bills	Cleveland Municipal Stadium	22,981
1949	December 11	Cleveland Browns	21–7	San Francisco 49ers	Cleveland Municipal Stadium	22,550

=== Other playoff games ===
In 1948, there was a tie for first place in the Eastern Division. In 1949, there was only one seven-team division, so the playoffs were a four team tournament.

Year	Date	Winning Team	Score	Losing Team	Location	Attendance
1948	December 12	Buffalo Bills	28–17	Baltimore Colts	Municipal Stadium	27,327
1949	December 4	Cleveland Browns	31–21	Buffalo Bills	Cleveland Municipal Stadium	17,240
1949	December 4	San Francisco 49ers	17–7	New York Yankees	Kezar Stadium	41,393

=== All-Star game ===
The AAFC played an all-star game only once, following the 1949 season. This game, played in Houston and known as the "Shamrock Bowl", was the league's last game before the merger with the NFL. The champion Browns faced a team of All-Stars from the other six teams.

Year	Date	Winning Team	Score	Losing Team	Location	Attendance
1949	December 17	AAFC All-Stars	12–7	Cleveland Browns	Rice Field, Houston	10,000

== Awards ==
=== Rookie of the Year ===
- 1946: Unknown
- 1947: Unknown
- 1948: Y. A. Tittle, QB, Baltimore Colts
- 1949: Unknown

=== Most Valuable Player ===
- 1946: Glenn Dobbs, HB, Brooklyn Dodgers
- 1947: Otto Graham, QB, Cleveland Browns
- 1948 (tie): Frankie Albert, QB, San Francisco 49ers
- 1948 (tie): Otto Graham, QB, Cleveland Browns
- 1949: none named

=== Coach of the Year ===
There was no official award issued by the league. However, starting in 1947, the Sporting News named a Coach of the Year for all of pro football. In 1947 and 1948, the choice was from the NFL. In 1949, this award went to Paul Brown of the Cleveland Browns.

=== Hall of Fame ===
The following AAFC players and coaches are enshrined in the Pro Football Hall of Fame in Canton, Ohio:

All-America Football Conference Hall of Famers
Players
Name	AAFC Team	Tenure	Induction
Len Ford	Los Angeles Dons	1948–1949	1976
Frank Gatski	Cleveland Browns	1946–1949	1985
Otto Graham	Cleveland Browns	1946–1949	1965
Lou Groza	Cleveland Browns	1946–1949	1974
Elroy "Crazylegs" Hirsch	Chicago Rockets	1946–1948	1967
Frank "Bruiser" Kinard	New York Yankees	1946–1947	1971
Dante Lavelli	Cleveland Browns	1946–1949	1975
Marion Motley	Cleveland Browns	1946–1949	1968
Clarence "Ace" Parker	New York Yankees	1946	1972
Joe Perry	San Francisco 49ers	1948–1949	1969
Mac Speedie	Cleveland Browns	1946–1949	2020
Y. A. Tittle	Baltimore Colts	1948–1949	1971
Arnie Weinmeister	New York Yankees	1948–1949	1984
Bill Willis	Cleveland Browns	1946–1949	1977
Coaches
Paul Brown	Cleveland Browns	1946–1949	1967
Ray Flaherty	New York Yankees	1946–1948	1976
Ray Flaherty	Chicago Hornets	1949	1976

(Note: Graham and Motley were also named to the NFL 75th Anniversary All-Time Team in 1994 and the NFL 100th Anniversary All-Time Team in 2019. Paul Brown was also named to the 100th Anniversary team.)

== Leaders ==
=== Rushing ===
Year	Rushing Yards Leader	Touchdowns Leader
1946	Spec Sanders (709), New York	Len Eshmont (6), San Francisco; Don Greenwood (6), Cleveland; John Kimbrough (6), Los Angeles; Spec Sanders (6), New York
1947	Spec Sanders (1,432), New York	Spec Sanders (19), New York
1948	Marion Motley (964), Cleveland	Chet Mutryn (10), Buffalo; Joe Perry (10), San Francisco
1949	Joe Perry (783), San Francisco	Joe Perry (8); Marion Motley (8)

=== Passing ===
Year	Passing Yards Leader	Touchdowns Leader
1946	Glenn Dobbs (1,886), Brooklyn	Otto Graham (17), Cleveland
1947	Otto Graham (2,753), Cleveland	Otto Graham (25), Cleveland
1948	Otto Graham (2,713), Cleveland	Frankie Albert (29), San Francisco
1949	Otto Graham (2,785), Cleveland	Frankie Albert (27), San Francisco

=== Receiving ===
Year	Receptions Leader	Receiving Yards Leader	Touchdowns Leader
1946	Alyn Beals (40), San Francisco; Dante Lavelli (40), Cleveland	Dante Lavelli (843), Cleveland	Alyn Beals (10), San Francisco
1947	Mac Speedie (67), Cleveland	Mac Speedie (1,146), Cleveland	Alyn Beals (10), San Francisco
1948	Mac Speedie (58), Cleveland	Billy Hillenbrand (970), Baltimore	Alyn Beals (14), San Francisco
1949	Mac Speedie (62), Cleveland	Mac Speedie (1,028), Cleveland	Alyn Beals (12), San Francisco

=== Scoring ===
Year	Name	Team	Points	TDs	FGs	PATs
1946	Lou Groza	Cleveland	84	0	13	45
1947	Spec Sanders	New York	114	19	0	0
1948	Chet Mutryn	Buffalo	96	16	0	0
1949	Alyn Beals	San Francisco	73	12	0	1

== Commissioners ==
1. Jim Crowley November 22, 1944 – 1947
2. Jonas H. Ingram February 26, 1947 – January 1949
3. Oliver O. Kessing January 22, 1949 – December 1949

== See also ==
- List of All-America Football Conference players
- 1950 AAFC dispersal draft
- List of leagues of American football
- All-America Football Conference playoffs
