= 1946 Cleveland Browns season =

All-America Football Conference team season

- Owner: Arthur B. McBride
- Head coach: Paul Brown
- Home stadium: Cleveland Stadium

Results
- Record: 12–2
- Division place: 1st AAFC Western
- Playoffs: Won AAFC Championship (vs. Yankees) 14–9
- All-Pros: Otto Graham; Marion Motley; Mac Speedie

The 1946 Cleveland Browns season was the team's first in the All-America Football Conference (AAFC). The Browns, coached by Paul Brown, ended the year with a record of 12–2, winning the AAFC's Western Division. Led by quarterback Otto Graham, fullback Marion Motley and ends Dante Lavelli and Mac Speedie, the team won the first AAFC championship game against the New York Yankees.

The Browns were founded by Arthur B. McBride, a Cleveland taxi-cab tycoon, as a charter franchise in the new AAFC. McBride in 1945 hired Brown, a successful coach at the high school and college levels. Brown, who was serving in the U.S. Navy during World War II, began to assemble a roster as the team prepared to begin play in 1946. After beating the Brooklyn Dodgers in an exhibition game, Cleveland opened the regular season against the Miami Seahawks at Cleveland Stadium on September 6, winning 44–0. The Browns proceeded to win six more games before losing for the first time in October against the San Francisco 49ers at home by a score of 34–20. Cleveland lost a second game in a row against the Los Angeles Dons the following week, but rebounded to win the final five games of the season, including a 66–14 victory over the Dodgers. Cleveland finished with the league's best record and a spot in the championship game against the Yankees. The Browns won the game 14–9.

Lavelli led the AAFC in receiving with 843 yards and 8 touchdowns, while placekicker Lou Groza led the league in points scored, with 84. Graham had the league's best passing average, with 10.5 yards per attempt. His quarterback rating of 112.1 was the highest in professional football history until Joe Montana surpassed it in 1989. Cleveland played all of its home games in Cleveland Stadium. The 1946 Browns set a professional football record with 67 defensive takeaways; the record still stands as of 2026.

== Founding of the Browns in the AAFC ==
In 1944 Arch Ward, the influential sports editor of the Chicago Tribune, started a new professional football league called the All-America Football Conference (AAFC). Ward, who had gained fame for starting all-star games for baseball and college football, lined up deep-pocketed owners including Arthur B. "Mickey" McBride, a Cleveland businessman who grew up in Chicago and knew Ward from his involvement in the newspaper business.

McBride developed a passion for football attending games at Notre Dame, where his son went to college. In the early 1940s he tried to buy the NFL's Cleveland Rams, owned by millionaire supermarket heir Dan Reeves, but was rebuffed. Having been awarded the Cleveland franchise in the AAFC, McBride asked Cleveland Plain Dealer sportswriter John Dietrich for head coaching suggestions. Dietrich recommended Paul Brown, the 36-year-old Ohio State Buckeyes coach. After consulting with Ward, McBride followed Dietrich's advice in early 1945, naming Brown head coach and giving him an ownership stake in the team and full control over player personnel. Brown, who had built an impressive record as coach of a Massillon, Ohio, high school team and brought the Buckeyes their first national championship, at the time was serving in the U.S. Navy and coached the football team at Great Lakes Naval Station near Chicago.

The name of the team was at first left up to Brown, who rejected calls for it to be christened the Browns. McBride then held a contest to name the team in May 1945; "Cleveland Panthers" was the most popular choice, but Brown rejected it because it was the name of an earlier failed football team. "That old Panthers team failed," Brown said. "I want no part of that name." In August, McBride gave in to popular demand and named the team the Browns, despite Paul Brown's objections.

== Building a roster ==
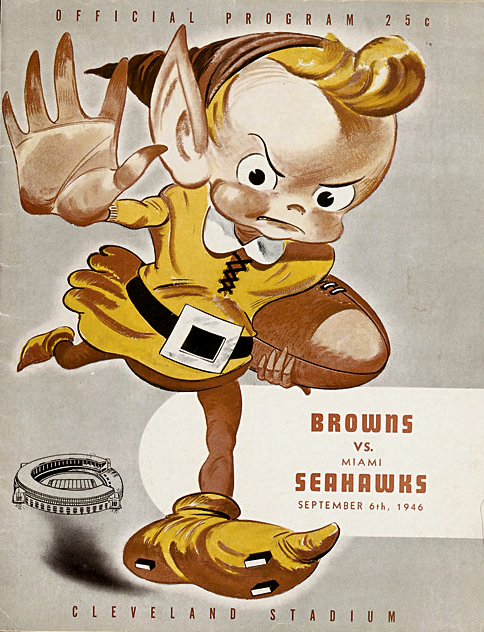
Game program depicting the Brownie elf, the team's primary mascot in its successful early years. From the Browns' first game on September 6, 1946, against the Miami Seahawks.

As the war wound down with Germany's surrender in May 1945, the team parlayed Brown's ties to college football and the military to build its roster. The first signing was Otto Graham, a former star quarterback at Northwestern University who was then serving in the Navy. The Browns later signed kicker and offensive tackle Lou Groza and wide receivers Dante Lavelli and Mac Speedie. Fullback Marion Motley and nose tackle Bill Willis, two of the earliest African-Americans to play professional football, also joined the team in 1946. Cleveland's first training camp took place at Bowling Green University in northwestern Ohio. Brown's reputation for winning notwithstanding, joining the team was a risk; the Browns and the AAFC were nascent entities and faced tough competition from the NFL. "I just went up there to see what would happen," center Frank Gatski said many years later.

Almost all of the players Brown signed were war veterans. Gatski hitchhiked to Bowling Green from West Virginia in a military uniform. Once at training camp, the players faced intense competition for spots on the final roster. Rookies who had their college careers cut short by the war faced off against veteran players from NFL teams including the Chicago Cardinals and Chicago Bears. "It was a tough, dog-eat-dog situation, and you really had to hustle," Groza said later. Almost all of the men Brown signed had played for or against his teams at Ohio State and Great Lakes.

Five former Rams players also jumped to the Browns in 1946: center Mike Scarry, tackle Chet Adams and backs Gaylon Smith, Tommy Colella and Don Greenwood. Their move gave rise to a legal battle with the Rams, who had left Cleveland for Los Angeles shortly after winning the 1945 NFL Championship when Reeves, the Rams' owner, realized he had no prospect of competing with the Browns.

Reeves subsequently filed an injunction against Adams in federal court after he signed with the Browns, claiming the tackle had unlawfully broken his contract to play for the Rams. Adams argued he had no obligation under his contract to play for the Rams, as the team were now the Los Angeles Rams following their relocation.

At the end of August 1946, federal judge Emerich Freed denied the Rams' injunction, allowing Adams to play for the Browns. Judge Freed rejected the Rams' contention that Adams had signed a contract to play for Reeves, not a specific team, and also ruled that the Cleveland Rams (by extension, Adams' contract) had ceased to exist.

In addition to the players, Brown hired a number of assistant coaches. John Brickels, an Ohio native, was brought in early on to sign players while Brown was still in the Navy. He later served as a backfield coach. Another hire was Blanton Collier, a high school coach for 16 years who had been an assistant to Brown at Great Lakes: Collier would succeed Brown in 1963 as the team's head coach. Fritz Heisler was brought in as a guard coach, and he stayed with the Browns until the 1970s.

== Roster and coaching staff ==
1946 Cleveland Browns roster
Backs: 92 Tommy Colella CB/RB/P; 99 Fred Evans CB/RB/P; 70 Gene Fekete FB/LB; 60 Otto Graham QB/S; 85 Don Greenwood CB/RB; 90 Edgar Jones RB/CB; 62 Cliff Lewis QB/S; 82 Bill Lund RB/CB; 76 Marion Motley FB/LB; 64 Bud Schwenk QB/S; 74 Gaylon Smith FB/LB; 88 Bob Steuber RB/CB; 84 Ray Terrell RB/CB; Ends/Receivers: 59 Al Coppage; 55 John Harrington; 56 Dante Lavelli; 54 John Rokisky; 58 Mac Speedie; 50 John Yonakor; 52 George Young	Linemen/Linebackers: 42 Chet Adams DT/T/K; 48 Ernie Blandin T/DT; 34 George Cheroke MG/G; 40 Jim Daniell T/DT; 22 Frank Gatski LB/C; 46 Lou Groza K/T; 32 Lin Houston G/MG; 24 Mel Maceau C/LB; 44 Lou Rymkus DT/T; 66 Lou Saban LB; 20 Mike Scarry C/LB; 36 Ed Ulinski G; 30 Bill Willis MG/G	Reserve: 80 Al Akins RB/CB (IR); 37 George Groves G/MG (IR); 39 Alex Kapter G/MG (IR); 49 Lenny Simonetti T/DT (IR); Head Coach: Paul Brown; Assistants: John Brickels (Backfield); Blanton Collier (Backfield); Red Conkright (Ends/Center); Dick Gallagher (Ends); Fritz Heisler (Guards); Creighton Miller (Backfield); Bob Voigts (Tackles); rookies in italics

== Preseason ==
Team	1	2	3	4	Total
Brooklyn Dodgers	7	6	0	7	20
• Browns	0	7	14	14	35

- Date: August 30
- Location: Rubber Bowl, Akron, Ohio
- Game attendance: 35,964
- Source: Cleveland Plain Dealer

Scoring summary
1	BKD	Joe Davis 2-yard pass from Glen Dobbs (Jim McCarthy kick)	BKD 7–0
2	BKD	Lew Mayne 25-yard rush (kick failed)	BKD 13–0
2	CLE	Fred Evans 7-yard pass from Cliff Lewis (Lou Groza kick)	BKD 13–7
3	CLE	John Rokisky 55-yard fumble recovery (Lou Groza kick)	CLE 14–13
3	CLE	Mac Speedie 2-yard pass from Otto Graham (Lou Groza kick)	CLE 21–13
4	CLE	Fred Evans 83-yard interception (Lou Groza kick)	CLE 28–13
4	CLE	George Young 20-yard pass from Otto Graham (Lou Groza kick)	CLE 35–13
4	BKD	Touchdown (Jim McCarthy kick)	CLE 35–20

The Browns' first and only preseason game took place at the Rubber Bowl in Akron, Ohio, against the Brooklyn Dodgers. Cleveland won the game 35–20. Brooklyn opened the scoring with a touchdown in the first quarter and another on the first play of the second quarter. Both touchdowns followed interceptions thrown by Otto Graham. Substituting for Graham, Cliff Lewis threw a short touchdown pass to Fred Evans near the end of the second quarter to give the Browns their first points. Cleveland scored again in the second half after John Rokisky picked up a fumble by Brooklyn halfback Glenn Dobbs and ran it 55 yards for a touchdown, giving the Browns the lead. Graham threw a short pass to Mac Speedie for another touchdown in the third quarter, and added a 20-yard pass to George Young in the fourth quarter to widen the lead. In the same quarter, Evans intercepted a Dobbs pass and ran 83 yards for his second touchdown. Brooklyn had a touchdown near the end of the game to make the final score 35–20. Cleveland won the game despite trailing the Dodgers in rushing yards, 93 to 63. After the win, the Browns prepared to face the Miami Seahawks in their first regular-season game the following Friday.

== Schedule ==
Game	Date	Opponent	Result	Record	Venue	Attendance	Recap	Source
1	September 6	Miami Seahawks	**W** 44–0	1–0	Cleveland Stadium	60,135	Recap	
2	September 13	at **Chicago Rockets**	**W** 20–6	2–0	Soldier Field	51,962	Recap	
3	September 22	at Buffalo Bisons	**W** 28–0	3–0	War Memorial Stadium	30,302	Recap	
4	September 26	New York Yankees	**W** 24–7	4–0	Cleveland Stadium	57,084	Recap	
5	October 6	Brooklyn Dodgers	**W** 26–7	5–0	Cleveland Stadium	43,713	Recap	
6	October 12	at New York Yankees	**W** 7–0	6–0	Yankee Stadium	34,252	Recap	
7	October 20	**Los Angeles Dons**	**W** 31–14	7–0	Cleveland Stadium	71,134	Recap	
8	October 27	**San Francisco 49ers**	**L** 20–34	7–1	Cleveland Stadium	70,385	Recap	
9	November 3	at **Los Angeles Dons**	**L** 16–17	7–2	Los Angeles Memorial Coliseum	24,800	Recap	
10	November 10	at **San Francisco 49ers**	**W** 14–7	8–2	Kezar Stadium	41,061	Recap	
11	November 17	**Chicago Rockets**	**W** 51–14	9–2	Cleveland Stadium	60,457	Recap	
12	November 24	Buffalo Bisons	**W** 42–17	10–2	Cleveland Stadium	37,054	Recap	
13	December 3	at Miami Seahawks	**W** 34–0	11–2	Miami Orange Bowl	9,038	Recap	
14	December 8	at Brooklyn Dodgers	**W** 66–14	12–2	Ebbets Field	14,600	Recap	
Note: Intra-division opponents are in **bold** text.

== Game summaries ==
=== Week 1: vs. Miami Seahawks ===
Team	1	2	3	4	Total
Seahawks	0	0	0	0	0
• Browns	10	17	0	17	44

- Date: September 6
- Location: Cleveland Stadium, Cleveland, Ohio
- Game attendance: 60,135
- Source: Pro Football Reference

Scoring summary
1	CLE	Mac Speedie 19-yard pass from Cliff Lewis (Lou Groza kick)	CLE 7–0
1	CLE	Lou Groza 22-yard field goal	CLE 10–0
2	CLE	Dante Lavelli 39-yard pass from Otto Graham (Lou Groza kick)	CLE 17–0
2	CLE	Tommy Colella 50-yard rush (Lou Groza kick)	CLE 24–0
2	CLE	Lou Groza 27-yard field goal	CLE 27–0
4	CLE	Don Greenwood 3-yard fumble return (Lou Groza kick)	CLE 34–0
4	CLE	Lou Groza 21-yard field goal	CLE 37–0
4	CLE	Ray Terrell 76-yard interception return (Lou Groza kick)	CLE 44–0

The Browns' first game, against the Miami Seahawks, took place on a warm late-summer evening in September. The crowd was the second-largest ever for a professional football game. The game was well-attended in part because of team owner Arthur B. McBride's promotion of the new team, but also because the Browns' two black players helped draw a large African-American crowd. Miami's team, drawn mainly from the Southern United States, was overmatched by Cleveland. The score was 27–0 at halftime and the final was 44–0. Browns end Mac Speedie scored the team's first points on a 19-yard touchdown pass from quarterback Cliff Lewis. Otto Graham came in at quarterback in the second quarter and threw a touchdown to Dante Lavelli. Placekicker Lou Groza kicked three field goals, and the Browns had two defensive touchdowns. Miami never advanced past the Browns' 39-yard line.

=== Week 2: vs. Chicago Rockets ===
Team	1	2	3	4	Total
• Browns	7	0	13	0	20
Rockets	0	0	0	6	6

- Date: September 13
- Location: Soldier Field, Chicago, Illinois
- Game attendance: 51,962
- Source: Pro Football Reference

Scoring summary
1	CLE	Marion Motley 20-yard rush (Lou Groza kick)	CLE 7–0
3	CLE	Lou Groza 21-yard field goal	CLE 10–0
3	CLE	Lou Groza 37-yard field goal	CLE 13–0
3	CLE	Don Greenwood 41-yard rush (Lou Groza kick)	CLE 20–0
4	CHI	Billy Hillenbrand 35-yard rush (kick failed)	CLE 20–6

In their second game, the Browns faced the Chicago Rockets at Soldier Field before a crowd of 51,962 people, an attendance record for a professional football game in Chicago. It was the first of many games during which Cleveland's two black players, Marion Motley and Bill Willis, endured racially charged verbal and physical abuse. Some of their white teammates, including Lou Rymkus, retaliated by dealing their own cheap shots. Motley opened the scoring with a 20-yard run for a touchdown, the first in his career. Lou Groza added two field goals in the third quarter, and halfback Don Greenwood ran for a 41-yard touchdown to make the final score 20–6. Chicago's only points came on a touchdown run by Billy Hillenbrand on the first play of the fourth quarter. Motley later said that racism on the field stopped after opponents saw how well he and Willis played: "They found out that while they were calling us niggers and alligator bait, I was running for touchdowns and Willis was knocking the shit out of them. So they stopped calling us names and started trying to catch up with us."

=== Week 3: vs. Buffalo Bisons ===
Team	1	2	3	4	Total
• Browns	21	0	0	7	28
Bisons	0	0	0	0	0

- Date: September 22
- Location: War Memorial Stadium, Buffalo, New York
- Game attendance: 30,302
- Source: Pro Football Reference

Scoring summary
1	CLE	John Yonakor 52-yard pass from Otto Graham (Lou Groza kick)	CLE 7–0
1	CLE	Marion Motley 33-yard pass from Otto Graham (Lou Groza kick)	CLE 14–0
1	CLE	Gaylon Smith 12-yard rush (Lou Groza kick)	CLE 21–0
4	CLE	Chet Adams 25-yard fumble return (Lou Groza kick)	CLE 28–0

The Browns next played the Buffalo Bisons in Buffalo, New York. Just over 30,000 people watched the game; while this was a lower total than the Browns' previous two games, it set a professional football attendance record in Buffalo. Playing in 80-degree heat, Browns quarterback Otto Graham threw two touchdowns in the first quarter to John Yonakor and Marion Motley. Cleveland scored for a third time in the first quarter when Cliff Lewis, substituting for Graham, pitched a lateral to Gaylon Smith, who ran it in for a touchdown. After neither team scored in the second and third quarters, the Browns added a fourth touchdown on Chet Adams' fumble return. Al Dekdebrun, Buffalo's second-string quarterback, fumbled at the Bisons' 34-yard line and Adams picked it up and ran for a touchdown. The Bisons were held scoreless despite having more first downs than the Browns. The team played without its primary rushing threat, Steve Juzwik, who was sidelined with a pulled leg muscle.

=== Week 4: vs. New York Yankees ===
Team	1	2	3	4	Total
Yankees	7	0	0	0	7
• Browns	14	0	0	10	24

- Date: September 29
- Location: Cleveland Stadium, Cleveland, Ohio
- Game attendance: 57,084
- Source: Pro Football Reference

Scoring summary
1	CLE	Dante Lavelli 7-yard pass from Otto Graham (Lou Groza kick)	CLE 7–0
1	CLE	Don Greenwood 2-yard rush (Lou Groza kick)	CLE 14–0
1	NYY	Jack Russell 14-yard pass from Spec Sanders (Harvey Johnson kick)	CLE 14–7
4	CLE	Lou Groza 22-yard field goal	CLE 17–7
4	CLE	Edgar Jones 43-yard rush (Lou Groza kick)	CLE 24–7

Cleveland got off to a strong start against the New York Yankees, scoring two touchdowns in the first nine minutes. Interceptions by Don Greenwood and center Mike Scarry set up the scores. The Yankees came back with a touchdown of their own later in the first quarter after recovering a Graham fumble at Cleveland's 14-yard line. Neither team scored in the second and third quarters, but the Browns added to their lead in the fourth. Lou Groza kicked a field goal and Edgar "Special Delivery" Jones ran up the middle for a 43-yard touchdown with less than three minutes left in the game. The final score was 24–7; it was the Yankees' first loss of the season and left the Browns as the only unbeaten and untied team in the AAFC. After the game, Yankees coach Ray Flaherty criticized his team for losing to a "Podunk team with a high school coach". The threat of bad weather kept attendance down, but the gross ticket receipts of $138,673 still marked the third-best take for a professional football game in history.

=== Week 5: vs. Brooklyn Dodgers ===
Team	1	2	3	4	Total
Dodgers	0	0	7	0	7
• Browns	12	7	0	7	26

- Date: October 6
- Location: Cleveland Stadium, Cleveland, Ohio
- Game attendance: 43,713
- Source: Pro Football Reference

Scoring summary
1	CLE	Lou Groza 15-yard field goal	CLE 3–0
1	CLE	Safety, Dobbs tackled in end zone by Al Coppage	CLE 5–0
1	CLE	Don Greenwood 1-yard rush (Lou Groza kick)	CLE 12–0
2	CLE	Don Greenwood 1-yard rush (Lou Groza kick)	CLE 19–0
3	BKD	Lew Mayne 4-yard rush (Phil Martinovich kick)	CLE 19–7
4	CLE	Tommy Colella 4-yard rush (Lou Groza kick)	CLE 26–7

The Browns won their fifth game in a row against the Brooklyn Dodgers, 26–7. Halfback Don Greenwood scored two touchdowns, one in the first quarter and another in the second. Tommy Colella added a third touchdown in the final quarter on a four-yard rush. Groza added a field goal and made all of his extra points, bringing his season scoring total to 38 and his string of consecutive extra points without a miss to 17. Edgar "Special Delivery" Jones intercepted a pass thrown by Dodgers quarterback Glenn Dobbs, and Lou Saban intercepted two more. Both of Saban's interceptions led to Browns scores. The Browns' defense held the Dodgers to just 37 yards of rushing. Bob Steuber, a Browns halfback, suffered a rib injury in the game and was expected to be out for two weeks.

=== Week 6: vs. New York Yankees ===
Team	1	2	3	4	Total
• Browns	0	0	7	0	7
Yankees	0	0	0	0	0

- Date: October 12
- Location: Yankee Stadium, New York City
- Game attendance: 34,252
- Source: Pro Football Reference

Scoring summary
3	CLE	Dante Lavelli 33-yard pass from Otto Graham (Lou Groza kick)	CLE 7–0

The Browns won their second matchup against the Yankees 7–0 amid a heavy downpour. The weather kept attendance to 34,252, but raised Cleveland's season attendance total over 300,000 people including its preseason game at the Akron Rubber Bowl. The only score of the game came in the third quarter, when quarterback Otto Graham passed to Dante Lavelli for a 33-yard touchdown. Cleveland won despite being outplayed by the Yankees statistically. The Yankees had 10 first downs to the Browns' five, and had 237 yards of total offense to just 67 yards for the Browns. Cleveland was held to just 24 yards of rushing, and Marion Motley, the team's star fullback, rushed for minus eight yards in six attempts. The Yankees threatened to tie the game at the end of the fourth quarter, driving to the Cleveland 16-yard line. New York's pass attempts failed, however, giving the Browns the victory. It was Cleveland's sixth win in a row.

=== Week 7: vs. Los Angeles Dons ===
Team	1	2	3	4	Total
Dons	7	0	0	7	14
• Browns	0	3	7	21	31

- Date: October 20
- Location: Cleveland Stadium, Cleveland, Ohio
- Game attendance: 71,134
- Source: Pro Football Reference

Scoring summary
1	LAD	Bob Nowaskey 18-yard pass from Charlie O'Rourke (Joe Aquirre kick)	LAD 7–0
2	CLE	Lou Groza 48-yard field goal	LAD 7–3
3	CLE	Otto Graham 2-yard rush (Lou Groza kick)	CLE 10–7
4	CLE	Mac Speedie 47-yard pass from Otto Graham (Lou Groza kick)	CLE 17–7
4	CLE	Marion Motley 49-yard rush (Lou Groza kick)	CLE 24–7
4	LAD	Charlie O'Rourke 6-yard rush (Joe Aquirre kick)	CLE 24–14
4	CLE	Marion Motley 68-yard rush (Lou Groza kick)	CLE 31–14

The Browns next beat the Los Angeles Dons 31–14 in Cleveland to extend their winning streak to seven games. The crowd of 71,134 people who attended the game on a sunny October day was a professional football record. Cleveland got off to a slow start, falling behind 7–3 at halftime. The Browns' only score in the first half came on a 49-yard Lou Groza field goal, then the fourth-longest kick in professional football history. A flurry of scoring at the end of the third quarter and in the fourth quarter, however, won Cleveland the game. Otto Graham passed 36 yards to end Dante Lavelli and then ran in a touchdown with less than three minutes left in the third. It was the first of four touchdowns in 14 minutes of play. Fullback Marion Motley ran in two touchdowns in the fourth quarter, one of them a 68-yard run that tied an AAFC record for a rush from scrimmage. The Browns won despite a strong ground attack by the Dons, who gained 274 yards of rushing. The Dons had 21 first downs compared to Cleveland's 10. Groza made all of his extra point attempts, extending his streak to 22 in a row.

=== Week 8: vs. San Francisco 49ers ===
Team	1	2	3	4	Total
• 49ers	3	17	7	7	34
Browns	0	6	0	14	20

- Date: October 27
- Location: Cleveland Stadium, Cleveland, Ohio
- Game attendance: 70,385
- Source: Pro Football Reference

Scoring summary
1	SFO	Joe Vetrano 22-yard field goal	SFO 3–0
2	SFO	Alyn Beals 16-yard pass from Frankie Albert (Joe Vetrano kick)	SFO 10–0
2	SFO	Len Eshmont 6-yard rush (Joe Vetrano kick)	SFO 17–0
2	CLE	Don Greenwood 3-yard rush (kick failed)	SFO 17–6
2	SFO	Joe Vetrano 19-yard field goal	SFO 20–6
3	SFO	Don Durdan 9-yard pass from Frankie Albert (Joe Vetrano kick)	SFO 27–6
4	CLE	Dante Lavelli 21-yard pass from Otto Graham (John Rokisky kick)	SFO 27–13
4	SFO	Alyn Beals 15-yard pass from Frankie Albert (Joe Vetrano kick)	SFO 34–13
4	CLE	Gaylon Smith 3-yard rush (Mac Speedie pass from Otto Graham)	CLE 34–20

The Browns suffered their first defeat of the season at the hands of the San Francisco 49ers before a crowd of 70,385 in Cleveland. The 49ers led throughout the game, helped by three touchdown passes from left-handed quarterback Frankie Albert. Albert's main target was Alyn Beals, a former Santa Clara University star who caught two of his passes for touchdowns. Kicker Joe Vetrano added to the 49ers lead with a pair of field goals in the first half. Don Greenwood ran for a Browns touchdown in the second quarter, but the extra point was botched. The snap was high and went into kicker Lou Groza's arms. He tried to run with the ball but suffered a back injury when he was tackled short of the end zone. Cliff Lewis was also injured in the second quarter, twisting his knee badly. He was taken to a hospital. The Browns ran only 24 offensive plays in the first half, and the 49ers were ahead by 14 points by halftime. Despite losing 34–20, the Browns matched the 49ers statistically, with 338 total yards to San Francisco's 357. Marion Motley, who had been the AAFC's leading rusher before the game, was held to 22 yards.

=== Week 9: vs. Los Angeles Dons ===
Team	1	2	3	4	Total
Browns	3	13	0	0	16
• Dons	7	0	0	10	17

- Date: November 3
- Location: Los Angeles Memorial Coliseum, Los Angeles
- Game attendance: 24,800
- Source: Pro Football Reference

Scoring summary
1	LAD	Chuck Fenenbock 75-yard rush (Joe Aquirre kick)	LAD 7–0
1	CLE	Lou Groza 25-yard field goal	LAD 7–3
2	CLE	Bill Lund 12-yard rush (Lou Groza kick)	CLE 10–7
2	CLE	Mac Speedie 79-yard pass from Otto Graham (kick failed)	CLE 16–7
4	LAD	Dale Gentry 8-yard rush (Joe Aquirre kick)	CLE 16–14
4	LAD	Joe Aquirre 11-yard field goal	LAD 17–16

Cleveland next lost its second straight game, against the Los Angeles Dons in Los Angeles. The Dons opened the scoring on the first play from scrimmage after the Browns kicked off. Chuck Fenenbock ran the ball 75 yards for a touchdown. Cleveland came back to build a 16–7 lead at halftime, but Groza missed his first extra point in 24 tries after Bill Lund ran for a touchdown in the second quarter. The missed extra point proved to be the difference in the game. Los Angeles went back on top in the fourth quarter with a Dale Gentry run for a touchdown and a field goal by Joe Aquirre with just 18 seconds left and won by one point, 17–16. A fumble by Browns halfback Ray Terrell at the Los Angeles 35-yard line in the fourth quarter gave the Dons the ball and led to Aquirre's game-winning field goal. Cleveland's running game stalled for the second game in a row; the team gained only 43 yards rushing. Bill Willis, the Browns' defensive star, sat out the entire game with a strep infection. Two other Browns players, Bob Steuber and Alex Kapter, suffered leg injuries and were helped off the field.

=== Week 10: vs. San Francisco 49ers ===
Team	1	2	3	4	Total
• Browns	7	7	0	0	14
49ers	0	0	0	7	7

- Date: November 10
- Location: Kezar Stadium, San Francisco
- Game attendance: 41,061
- Source: Pro Football Reference

Scoring summary
1	CLE	Dante Lavelli 3-yard pass from Otto Graham (Lou Groza kick)	CLE 7–0
2	CLE	Gaylon Smith 3-yard rush (Lou Groza kick)	CLE 14–0
4	SFO	Frankie Albert 1-yard fumble return (Joe Vetrano kick)	CLE 14–7

The Browns won their rematch with San Francisco 14–7 two weeks after losing to the 49ers at home. Cleveland rebounded from two poor rushing games. Runs by halfback Bill Lund and fullback Marion Motley set up touchdowns in the first half. Lund had a series of successful carries that set up the first touchdown in the first quarter, a short pass to Dante Lavelli from Otto Graham. Motley's 64-yard run in the second quarter was followed by a three-yard touchdown run by Gaylon Smith. Lund, however, turned his ankle in the first quarter and did not return to the game. Motley also suffered a pulled leg muscle in the second quarter and played sparingly thereafter. The 49ers came back in the fourth quarter with strong rushing from fullback Norm Standlee and Earle Parsons. Frankie Albert scored the team's lone touchdown on a one-yard run. San Francisco threatened to tie the game, reaching the Cleveland 19-yard line with five minutes to play, but the Browns defense stood firm and stopped the advance. The win put the Browns two games ahead of the 49ers in the AAFC's western conference with four games to play.

=== Week 11: vs. Chicago Rockets ===
Team	1	2	3	4	Total
Rockets	0	7	7	0	14
• Browns	7	10	14	20	51

- Date: November 17
- Location: Cleveland Stadium, Cleveland, Ohio
- Game attendance: 60,457
- Source: Pro Football Reference

Scoring summary
1	CLE	Edgar Jones 26-yard rush (Lou Groza kick)	CLE 7–0
2	CLE	Dante Lavelli 8-yard pass from Otto Graham (Lou Groza kick)	CLE 14–0
2	CHI	Elroy Hirsch 17-yard pass from Bob Hoernschemeyer (Steve Nemeth kick)	CLE 14–7
2	CLE	Lou Groza 51-yard field goal	CLE 17–7
3	CLE	Dante Lavelli 34-yard pass from Otto Graham (Lou Groza kick)	CLE 24–7
3	CLE	Mac Speedie 39-yard pass from Otto Graham (Lou Groza kick)	CLE 31–7
3	CHI	Pete Lamana 20-yard punt return (Steve Nemeth kick)	CLE 31–14
4	CLE	Mac Speedie 7-yard pass from Otto Graham (Lou Groza kick)	CLE 38–14
4	CLE	Bill Lund 20-yard pass from Bud Schwenk (Lou Groza kick)	CLE 45–14
4	CLE	Frank Gatski 36-yard interception return (kick failed)	CLE 51–14

Cleveland beat the Rockets 51–14 at home before a crowd of 60,457, the fourth time during the season that attendance at Cleveland Stadium surpassed 60,000 people. The Browns led from start to finish, and Lavelli and Speedie had two touchdown receptions each. Graham's four touchdown passes helped the Browns reach an AAFC scoring record. Bud Schwenk made his first appearance in the fourth quarter of the game, substituting for Graham as the game turned into a blowout. He threw for a fifth touchdown, a 20-yard pass to Bill Lund. Edgar Jones added to Cleveland's scoring with a touchdown run in the first quarter, and center Frank Gatski scored the team's final touchdown in the fourth quarter after intercepting a pass and running it back 36 yards. It was the only touchdown of Gatski's 12-year career. Groza made a 51-yard field goal, the longest of the year in either the National Football League or AAFC, and kicked through six of the team's seven extra points. The seventh extra point was blocked, only the second time he missed a conversion in 33 tries. The Rockets managed two touchdowns, the first by Elroy Hirsch on an 81-yard drive in the second quarter and the second on a 76-yard punt return in the third quarter.

=== Week 12: vs. Buffalo Bisons ===
Team	1	2	3	4	Total
Bisons	10	0	0	7	17
• Browns	7	7	14	14	42

- Date: November 24
- Location: Cleveland Stadium, Cleveland, Ohio
- Game attendance: 37,054
- Source: Pro Football Reference

Scoring summary
1	CLE	Edgar Jones 46-yard rush (Lou Groza kick)	CLE 7–0
1	BUF	Vic Kulbitski 1-yard rush (Lou Zontini kick)	7–7
1	BUF	Lou Zontini 40-yard field goal	BUF 10–7
2	CLE	Edgar Jones 37-yard pass from Otto Graham (Lou Groza kick)	CLE 14–10
3	CLE	Mac Speedie 4-yard pass from Otto Graham (Lou Groza kick)	CLE 21–10
3	CLE	Marion Motley 76-yard rush (Lou Groza kick)	CLE 28–10
4	CLE	Al Akins 50-yard rush (Lou Groza kick)	CLE 35–10
4	CLE	Bud Schwenk 1-yard rush (Lou Groza kick)	CLE 42–10
4	BUF	Fay King 12-yard pass from George Terlep (Lou Zontini kick)	CLE 42–17

Cleveland clinched first place in the AAFC's western division and earned a spot in the championship game by beating the Bisons 42–17. The Browns fell behind 10–7 in the first quarter, but subsequently scored 35 unanswered points. Edgar Jones scored two touchdowns, while Motley ran 76 yards for another score. Al Akins and Bud Schwenk had their only touchdowns of the season, playing in the fourth quarter after the Browns amassed a large lead. Despite the Browns' large margin of victory, the game was evenly matched; Cleveland's scores came mostly on breakaway plays. The Bisons had 19 first downs, nine more than the Browns, although the Browns out-gained the Bisons with 455 total yards. The game was marred by numerous penalties against both teams for unnecessary roughness, and the Bisons' kicker Lou Zontini and Browns halfback Ray Terrell were ejected after getting into a fight at midfield in the second quarter. A total of 37,054 people attended the game, the lowest figure for a Browns home game at that point in the season.

=== Week 13: vs. Miami Seahawks ===
Team	1	2	3	4	Total
• Browns	7	10	7	10	34
Seahawks	0	0	0	0	0

- Date: December 3
- Location: Miami Orange Bowl, Miami
- Game attendance: 9,038
- Source: Pro Football Reference

Scoring summary
1	CLE	Otto Graham 37-yard interception return (Lou Groza kick)	CLE 7–0
2	CLE	Edgar Jones 1-yard rush (Lou Groza kick)	CLE 14–0
2	CLE	Lou Groza 50-yard field goal	CLE 17–0
3	CLE	Gaylon Smith 2-yard rush (Lou Groza kick)	CLE 24–0
4	CLE	Lou Groza 11-yard field goal	CLE 27–0
4	CLE	Gene Fekete 16-yard rush (Lou Groza kick)	CLE 34–0

Despite traveling without key players Marion Motley and Bill Willis because of Florida's segregation laws, Cleveland beat Miami in a shutout for the second time in the season, winning 34–0. Fueled by the ire the entire team felt because of leaving friends behind, Otto Graham opened the scoring with a 37-yard interception return for a touchdown and the Browns never looked back. Three other Browns players – Edgar Jones, Gaylon Smith and Gene Fekete – ran for touchdowns. Fekete's touchdown was the only one of his short professional career. Groza kicked two field goals, giving him 12 on the season and tying the all-time professional record set in 1926 by Paddy Driscoll. Cleveland led Miami in all phases of the game, amassing 159 yards rushing to Miami's eight and 233 yards of total offense. Miami gained a total of 46 yards rushing and passing. As the Browns prepared to face the Dodgers in the last game of the regular season, they looked ahead to a matchup in the AAFC championship in Cleveland on December 22 with the New York Yankees, the winners the eastern division.

=== Week 14: vs. Brooklyn Dodgers ===
Team	1	2	3	4	Total
• Browns	14	14	17	21	66
Dodgers	0	7	0	7	14

- Date: December 8
- Location: Ebbets Field, Brooklyn
- Game attendance: 14,600
- Source: Pro Football Reference

Scoring summary
1	CLE	Bill Lund 22-yard pass from Bud Schwenk (Lou Groza kick)	CLE 7–0
1	CLE	Marion Motley 7-yard rush (Lou Groza kick)	CLE 14–0
2	CLE	Mac Speedie 11-yard pass from Otto Graham (Lou Groza kick)	CLE 21–0
2	BKD	Saxon Judd 12-yard fumble return (Phil Martinovich kick)	CLE 21–7
2	CLE	Edgar Jones 96-yard kickoff return (Lou Groza kick)	CLE 28–7
3	CLE	Lou Groza 31-yard field goal	CLE 31–7
3	CLE	Chet Adams 4-yard interception return (Chet Adams kick)	CLE 38–7
3	CLE	Gaylon Smith 2-yard rush (Chet Adams kick)	CLE 45–7
4	CLE	John Yonakor 18-yard pass from Bud Schwenk (Chet Adams kick)	CLE 52–7
4	BKD	Saxon Judd 52-yard pass from Charlie Armstrong (Phil Martinovich kick)	CLE 52–14
4	CLE	Dante Lavelli 37-yard pass from Bud Schwenk (Chet Adams kick)	CLE 59–14
4	CLE	Tommy Colella 12-yard pass from Otto Graham (Chet Adams kick)	CLE 66–14

The last game of the Browns' regular season was a 66–14 win over the Dodgers. Nine different Cleveland players scored touchdowns in the game. The Browns' point total set an AAFC scoring record. Groza kicked a field goal to reach 13 for the season, exceeding Driscoll's all-time record. He also kicked four extra points, bringing his total for the season to 45 and beating the previous professional record of 42. Groza, however, injured his left ankle in the third quarter while making a tackle and had to be carried off the field. Substituting for Groza, Chet Adams kicked through five more extra points. Otto Graham played less than half of the game as Cleveland built a large lead, and Cliff Lewis and Bud Schwenk substituted for him in the second half. The Browns ended the game with several injured players at key positions. In addition to Groza, halfbacks Ray Terrell, Don Greenwood and Al Akins had to sit out because of injuries. The win gave Cleveland a 12–2 record as they prepared to face the Yankees in the championship game.

== Final standings ==
AAFC Western Division
	W	L	T	PCT	DIV	PF	PA	STK
Cleveland Browns	12	2	0	.857	4–2	423	137	W5
San Francisco 49ers	9	5	0	.643	4–2	307	189	W3
Los Angeles Dons	7	5	2	.583	2–3–1	305	290	T1
Chicago Rockets	5	6	3	.455	1–4–1	263	315	T1

Note: Tie games were not officially counted in the standings.

== AAFC championship ==
A week before the championship game, three Browns players were arrested after a confrontation with Cleveland police. Team captain Jim Daniell, end Mac Speedie, tackle Lou Rymkus and halfback Edgar Jones were drinking and waiting for Speedie's wife to arrive on a flight from Utah. They dropped Jones off and came up behind a police car that was blocking their way. Daniell, who was driving the car, honked the horn, and an argument ensued that ended with the arrest of all three men. Daniell was booked on public intoxication, and Speedie and Rymkus were charged with creating a disturbance. Paul Brown fired Daniell after the incident, saying he had "a special obligation to be exemplary in his behavior" because he was the team captain.

Team	1	2	3	4	Total
Yankees	3	0	6	0	9
• Browns	0	7	0	7	14

- Date: December 22
- Location: Cleveland Stadium
- Game attendance: 41,181
- Source: Pro Football Reference

Scoring summary
1	NYY	Harvey Johnson 21-yard field goal	NYY 3–0
2	CLE	Marion Motley 2-yard rush (Lou Groza kick)	CLE 7–3
3	NYY	Spec Sanders 2-yard rush (kick failed)	NYY 9–7
4	CLE	Dante Lavelli 16-yard pass from Otto Graham (Lou Groza kick)	CLE 14–9

The first-ever AAFC championship took place on December 22, 1946, at Cleveland Stadium before a crowd of 41,181. Temperatures were in the 30s, which contributed to the low attendance numbers compared to other Browns home games, but the championship game drew more people than all but three NFL championship games up to that point. The Yankees were in close competition with the Browns as the AAFC's leading team, and finished the season by winning seven of their last eight games. The Browns and Yankees had different styles of play: while the Browns used a T formation offense, the Yankees had a single-wing formation. New York's roster included Spec Sanders, who led the AAFC with 709 yards of rushing and 12 touchdowns.

The championship game was largely a defensive battle with little scoring from either team. New York scored the game's first points in the first quarter on a 21-yard field goal by Harvey Johnson, but the Browns went into the lead in the second quarter when Marion Motley ran for a touchdown after a 70-yard drive. The Yankees retook the lead in the third quarter, marching 80 yards down the field for a Sanders touchdown. Cleveland reached the New York 18-yard line at the end of the third, but the drive stalled and Lou Groza missed a short field goal, his third failed attempt of the game. Groza had suffered a sprained left ankle, and Chet Adams substituted for him. Adams, however, missed another field goal in the fourth quarter. The Browns took the lead again in the fourth quarter when Graham passed to Lavelli for a 16-yard touchdown. Groza came back in and kicked the extra point, giving Cleveland a 14–9 advantage with 4:31 to play in the game. Sanders returned the ensuing kickoff 35 yards, and the Yankees started the drive at the Browns' 45-yard line. The Yankees appeared poised for a comeback, but Graham intercepted a pass on a third down and Cleveland was almost able to run out the clock. Time expired after a Tommy Colella punt and one short Yankees completion.

Graham had 213 yards of passing in the championship game. Lavelli registered 87 receiving yards, and Speedie had 71. Motley was the team's leading rusher, with 98 yards on 13 carries. Cleveland's defense was able to hold Sanders and New York quarterback Ace Parker in check. Parker had only 81 yards of passing, and Sanders ran for just 55 yards.

== Season leaders ==
Graham had an average of 10.5 yards per passing attempt, the second-most in history at the time. He had a passer rating of 112.1, setting a single-season record not exceeded until Joe Montana eclipsed it in 1989. Motley finished the season with 601 yards rushing, the fourth most in the AAFC. Edgar Jones was the league's fifth-most-prolific rusher, gaining 539 yards. Greenwood had six rushing touchdowns, tying for the league lead. Lavelli tied for first place in receptions, with 40, and led the league in receiving yards, with 843. His eight receiving touchdowns gave him second place in the league. Speedie, meanwhile, led all receivers in yards per reception, with 23.5. On defense, Colella led the AAFC with 10 interceptions; as a team, the Browns were the league's interception leaders by a large margin, with 41. The Browns had 67 total defensive takeaways, a professional football record that still stands. Groza scored the most field goals and extra points and set a professional football record for a kicker by scoring 84 points. He was the first-ever kicker to make two field goals from beyond 50 yards in a season. A number of Browns players were named to sportswriters' All-Pro teams, including Motley, Speedie, Lavelli, Willis and Mike Scarry.

== Bibliography ==
- Cantor, George (2008). Paul Brown: The Man Who Invented Modern Football. Chicago: Triumph Books. ISBN 978-1-57243-725-8.
- Henkel, Frank M. (2005). Cleveland Browns History. Mount Pleasant, SC: Arcadia Publishing. ISBN 978-0-7385-3428-2.
- Knight, Jonathan (2013). The Browns Bible: The Complete Game-by-Game History of the Cleveland Browns. Kent, OH: Black Squirrel Books.
- Piascik, Andy (2007). The Best Show in Football: The 1946–1955 Cleveland Browns. Lanham, MD: Taylor Trade Publishing. ISBN 978-1-58979-571-6.
