= Red Conkright =

American football player and coach (1914–1980)

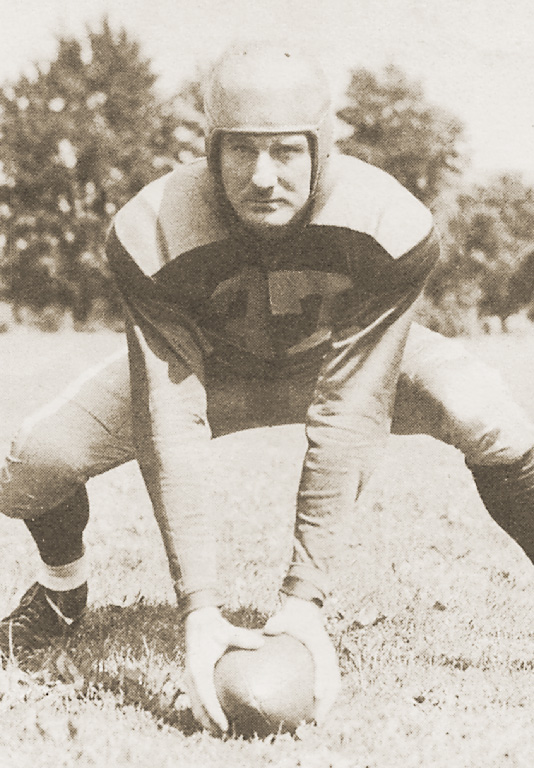
- Conkright in 1940

No. 47, 37, 38
- Positions: Center, End, Linebacker

Personal information
- Born: April 17, 1914; Beggs, Oklahoma, U.S.
- Died: October 27, 1980 (aged 66); Houston, Texas, U.S.
- Listed height: 6 ft 1 in (1.85 m)
- Listed weight: 203 lb (92 kg)

Career information
- High school: Central (Tulsa, Oklahoma)
- College: Oklahoma (1933-1936)
- NFL draft: 1937: 5th round, 48th overall pick

Career history

Playing
- Chicago Bears (1937–1938); Cleveland Rams (1939–1942); Brooklyn Dodgers (1943); Washington Redskins (1943); Cleveland Rams (1944)

Coaching
- Cleveland Rams (1944–1945) Assistant coach; Cleveland Browns (1946) Assistant coach; Buffalo Bills (1947-1948) Assistant coach; Baltimore Colts (1949) Assistant coach; Mississippi State (1950–1951) Assistant coach; Houston (1957–1958) Line coach; Stephen F. Austin (1959–1961) Head coach; Oakland Raiders (1962) Assistant coach; Oakland Raiders (1962) Head coach; Houston Oilers (1963-1964) Assistant coach

Awards and highlights
- First-team All-Big Six (1936)

Career NFL statistics
- Games played: 62
- Games started: 30
- Interceptions: 5
- Stats at Pro Football Reference

Head coaching record
- Regular season: 6–25–1 (.203) (College); 1–8–0 (.111) (NFL)
- Coaching profile at Pro Football Reference

William Franklin Conkright (April 17, 1914 – October 27, 1980), known more commonly by the nickname "Red", was an American professional football center and end who played eight seasons in the National Football League (NFL) and was later the head coach of the Oakland Raiders for part of the 1962 season.

Conkright was born in Oklahoma and attended the University of Oklahoma, where he was a star center on the school's football team. He was the captain of the Sooners team in 1936 and was named to a first-team all-Big Six Conference squad. Conkright was drafted in 1937 by the NFL's Chicago Bears. He played two seasons for the Bears, serving mainly as a backup center and occasionally playing as an end. The Cleveland Rams bought the rights to Conkright in 1939, and he stayed with the team through the 1942 season. He played for the Washington Redskins and Brooklyn Dodgers in 1943 before returning to the Rams briefly in 1944.

Following his retirement as a player, Conkright began a career as a coach. He scouted and coached for the Rams in 1944 and 1945, and moved to the Cleveland Browns of the new All-America Football Conference (AAFC) in 1946. He worked as an assistant coach for two more AAFC teams in the late 1940s. Conkright was hired as an assistant at Mississippi State College in 1950, spending two seasons in the position. After a five-year hiatus from coaching, he returned as an assistant for the University of Houston's football team. He got his first head coaching job in 1959 at Stephen F. Austin State University. In 1962, Conkright was hired as an assistant coach and director of player personnel by the Oakland Raiders in the American Football League. The team's head coach, Marty Feldman, was fired in the middle of the season and Conkright replaced him. Conkright's Raiders, however, managed to win just one game that year, and he was replaced in 1963 by Al Davis. Conkright went on to work for two years as an assistant with the Houston Oilers.

== Early life ==
Conkright was born in Beggs, Oklahoma and went to a high school in Tulsa, where he was a football star. He was nicknamed "Red" because of his red hair.

== College and professional career ==
Conkright attended the University of Oklahoma and played varsity college football during the 1934, 1935, and 1936 seasons. He was the team's captain as a senior in 1936, and was named a first-team All-Big Six Conference center. Conkright was missed when he graduated; sportswriter Federick Ware wrote in the 1937 edition of Football Illustrated Annual that "finding a center to replace the great Red Conkright" would be one of Sooners head coach Tom Stidham's "main headaches."

Conkright was selected in the fifth round of the 1937 draft by the Chicago Bears of the National Football League (NFL). He was a third-string center for the Bears behind Frank Bausch and Frank Sullivan with the Bears, and saw little action in the two years he played for the team. He was, however, occasionally used as an end in his first season. Conkright was sold to the Cleveland Rams ahead of the 1939 season in a cash deal that did not involve any other players. He became the regular starter at center for the Rams midway through 1939, replacing Chuck Cherundolo. The Rams finished the season with a 5–5–1 win-loss-tie record under coach Dutch Clark.

Conkright broke his leg in the second game of the 1940 season and sat out the rest of the year. In October, he married his girlfriend Imogene, whom he met at the University of Oklahoma and with whom he had a four-month-old son. Conkright came back to play full seasons for the Rams in 1941 and 1942. He split the 1943 season between the NFL's Brooklyn Dodgers and the Washington Redskins.

Conkright returned to the Rams in 1944 and was expected to be used as a regular left end. He saw action in only one game, however, his final appearance in the NFL. He was then placed on the inactive list and converted into an assistant coach and scout for the Rams.

== Coaching career ==
Conkright remained with the Rams through the 1945 season, when the team won the NFL championship. Rams owner Dan Reeves moved the team to Los Angeles after the season, but Conkright decided to stay in Cleveland, where he and his family lived. He took a job as a scout and coach for the Cleveland Browns, a team that was to start play in 1946 in the new All-America Football Conference (AAFC).

Conkright was joined by five former Rams players who switched to the Browns when the Rams moved, including center Mike Scarry, tackle Chet Adams and backs Gaylon Smith, Tommy Colella and Don Greenwood. Before the 1946 season started, Reeves sought an injunction in federal court to prevent Adams from signing with the Browns and force the tackle to honor his contract with the Rams. Adams argued that his contract described a team in Cleveland, and the move to Los Angeles invalidated it. Then acting as an agent for the Rams, Conkright had signed Adams to a new contract in October 1945. Conkright was named as a defendant in the suit, which was decided in August in Adams's favor.

Conkright spent a year as Cleveland's end and center coach under head coach Paul Brown as the team won the 1946 AAFC championship. While with the Browns, he coached ends Mac Speedie and future Pro Football Hall of Fame member Dante Lavelli, who he praised for his "uncanny way of getting into the open" to receive passes from quarterback Otto Graham.

Conkright signed as an end and center coach for the AAFC's Buffalo Bills in April 1947. In moving to the Bills, he rejoined Tom Stidham, his old head coach at Oklahoma. Stidham was working as the Bills' line coach. Conkright convinced the Bills to put into place Brown's version of the T formation offense, and the team improved in the 1947 and 1948 seasons. The Bills advanced to the 1948 AAFC championship, but lost the game to the Browns.

Conkright was hired as an assistant coach by the Baltimore Colts in 1949, and spent one season with the team. He took a job as an end and center coach for Mississippi State College in 1950 and spent two seasons there.

After five years away from football, Conkright in 1957 became a defensive line coach at the University of Houston. Two years later, he was named the head football coach at Stephen F. Austin State University in Nacogdoches, Texas. In three seasons as coach there, his football team did not have a winning season and posted an overall win-loss-tie record of 6–25–1.

Conkright resigned as Austin's head coach late in November 1961. The following April, he was hired by the Oakland Raiders of the American Football League (AFL) as defensive line coach and director of player personnel on the staff of head coach Marty Feldman. Following a 2–10 season in 1961, the Raiders opened the 1962 season with five straight losses, leading to Feldman's dismissal and his replacement by Conkright as head coach on October 16, 1962. The Raiders finished the season with a 1–13 record under Conkright, and he was replaced in January 1963 by Al Davis.

After his firing by the Raiders, Conkright joined the coaching staff of the AFL's Houston Oilers. He was an assistant for the Oilers in 1963 and 1964.

== Death ==
Conkright died in 1980 in Houston, Texas. He was 66 years old.

== Head coaching record ==
=== College ===
Year	Team	Overall	Conference	Standing
Stephen F. Austin Lumberjacks (Lone Star Conference) (1959–1961)
1959	Stephen F. Austin	4–6–1	4–3	T–4th
1960	Stephen F. Austin	1–10	1–6	T–7th
1961	Stephen F. Austin	1–9	1–6	T–7th
Stephen F. Austin:		6–25–1	6–15	
Total:		6–25–1		

=== NFL ===
Team	Year	Regular season					Postseason			
Team	Year	Won	Lost	Ties	Win %	Finish	Won	Lost	Win %	Result
OAK	1962	1	8	0	.286	4th in AFL West	-	-	-	
Total		1	8	0	.286					
