= Chet Adams =

American football player (1915–1990)

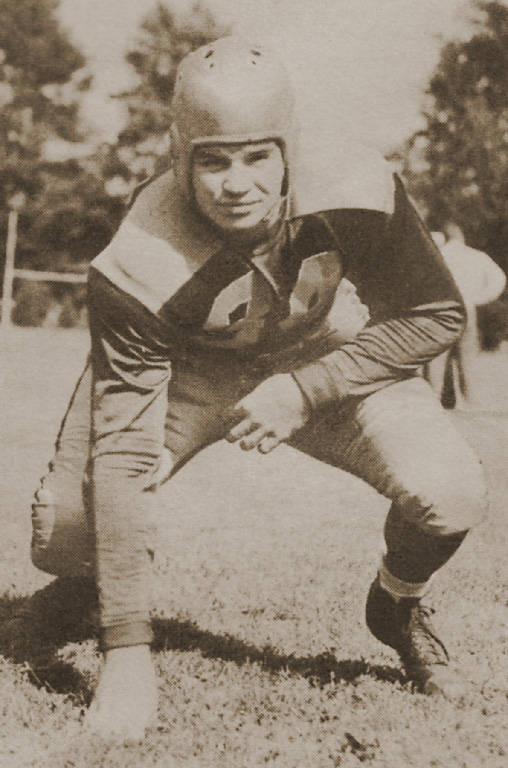
- Adams in 1940, while playing for the Cleveland Rams

No. 34, 27, 42, 71
- Positions: Tackle, end

Personal information
- Born: October 24, 1915; Cleveland, Ohio, U.S.
- Died: October 28, 1990 (aged 75); Cleveland, Ohio, U.S.
- Listed height: 6 ft 3 in (1.91 m)
- Listed weight: 235 lb (107 kg)

Career information
- High school: South (Cleveland)
- College: Ohio (1935-1938)
- NFL draft: 1939: 12th round, 103rd overall pick

Career history
- Cleveland Rams (1939–1942); Green Bay Packers (1943); Cleveland Browns (1946–1948); Buffalo Bills (1949); New York Yanks (1950)

Awards and highlights
- 3× AAFC champion (1946, 1947, 1948); Second-team All-Pro (1943); 2× All-Star (1941, 1942)

Career NFL/AAFC statistics
- Games played: 117
- Games started: 52
- Field goals made: 13
- Field goal attempts: 40
- Field goal %: 32.5
- Stats at Pro Football Reference

Chester Frank Adams (October 24, 1915 – October 27, 1990) was an American professional football player who was a tackle and placekicker for 10 seasons in the National Football League (NFL) and All-America Football Conference (AAFC), primarily with the Cleveland Rams and Cleveland Browns. He was selected to the NFL's All-Star game twice. In 1978, he was inducted into the Greater Cleveland Sports Hall of Fame.

Adams grew up in Cleveland and played college football for the Ohio Bobcats. After graduating, he played four seasons for the Cleveland Rams before World War II forced the team to suspend operations in 1943. Adams was loaned to the Green Bay Packers, where he played for a year before joining the U.S. Army. When Adams returned from his military duty, the Rams had moved to Los Angeles, and he signed up to play for the Cleveland Browns, a team under formation in the AAFC. The Rams sued to prevent him from playing for the Browns, but Adams won. He stayed with Cleveland between 1946 and 1948, a span during which the team won three AAFC championships. He was then traded to the Buffalo Bills, where he stayed for a year. He played for the NFL's New York Yanks for a final year before retiring.

== Early life and college ==
Adams was born in Cleveland, Ohio, and attended the city's South High School. After graduating, he went to Ohio University in Athens, Ohio. He was named to the All-Ohio second team in 1937 and the All-Ohio first team in 1938 as a tackle.

== Football career ==
Adams was selected in 1939 by the Cleveland Rams with the 103rd pick of the 1939 NFL draft and played for the team until 1942. In his first season with the Rams, Detroit Lions assistant coach Hunk Anderson praised Adams' play, considering him the "best lineman on the field" after a 14–3 Rams win. After playing in nine games his rookie season, Adams started in all 11 games in 1940. The next season he again started all 11 games while also serving as the team's placekicker; his play that season led to his first selection to the NFL's All-Star game. Adams was again the every-week starting tackle and kicker for the Rams in 1942, and was selected to the All-Star game for the second straight year. Adams then played one season for the Green Bay Packers on loan from the Rams after the team suspended operations during World War II; he played in 10 games for the Packers. Adams joined the U.S. Army in 1944 and served for 30 months until his discharge in the summer of 1946.

Adams signed a contract to play for the Rams in 1946, but Rams owner Dan Reeves moved the team to Los Angeles after the 1945 season. Adams refused to move to Los Angeles with the team and the Rams sued him in federal court after he signed with the Cleveland Browns, a team under formation in the new All-America Football Conference (AAFC). Adams claimed that he had no obligation under his contract to play for the Rams because the team was described as the Cleveland Rams and its name had changed to the Los Angeles Rams following the move. The Rams filed an injunction in August 1946 to prevent him from playing for the Browns.

Later that month, Adams testified before a federal court that he injured his leg in the College All-Star Game while playing for Green Bay in 1945 and was not, as the Rams claimed, a player of "unique ability". Red Conkright, a one-time Rams assistant who moved to the Browns' staff, testified that Adams was an "erratic" kicker and "at present a second-team player". At the end of the month, federal judge Emerich Freed denied the Rams' injunction, allowing Adams to play for the Browns. The judge rejected the Rams' contention that Adams had signed to play for Reeves, not a specific team. He ruled the Cleveland Rams had ceased to exist and that Adams therefore had no obligation to fulfill a contract with the Los Angeles Rams. Four other former Rams players joined the Browns along with Adams: Tommy Colella, Don Greenwood, Mike Scarry and Gaylon Smith.

In the Browns' first season in 1946, Adams played on the line and shared kicking duties with Lou Groza. In a 66–14 win that December over the AAFC's Brooklyn Dodgers, he scored a touchdown on a blocked punt and kicked five extra points. The Browns advanced to the AAFC championship that year, and Adams, who had played primarily at right defensive tackle, was asked to do the team's place-kicking after Groza suffered a sprained ankle in an earlier game. The Browns beat the Yankees 14–9 in the championship game. Adams continued to play as a defensive tackle and a backup to Groza in 1947. Then 32 years old, he suffered neck and back injuries in a game against Los Angeles. He re-injured his neck in the championship game, another win over the Yankees.

Adams was part of a Cleveland team that won all of its games in 1948 and ended the season by beating the Buffalo Bills for a third straight championship. The Browns traded Adams before the 1949 season to the Bills in a five-player deal, with Cleveland coach Paul Brown stating that the team needed to stay fresh after winning three championships. Adams played a year in Buffalo, mainly as a kicker. He then played a final year for the New York Yanks before retiring to become a sporting goods salesman.

== Later life and death ==
After retiring from football, Adams remained in Cleveland, living in the Slavic Village neighborhood. He was inducted into the Greater Cleveland Sports Hall of Fame in 1978. He died on October 27, 1990.
