= Martin Feldman =

Martin Feldman is the name of:

- Martin Leach-Cross Feldman (1934–2022), United States federal judge
- Marty Feldman (American football) (1922–2015), American football player
- Marty Feldman (1934–1982), English writer, comedian and actor
