= Richard F. Gallagher =

American football player, coach, and executive; basketball coach; baseball coach

Biographical details
- Born: October 28, 1909; Ironton, Ohio, U.S.
- Died: March 29, 1995 (aged 85); Canton, Ohio, U.S.

Playing career

Football
- c. 1929: Kentucky Wesleyan
- 1930: Ironton Tanks

Coaching career (HC unless noted)

Football
- 1931–1932: Pedro HS (OH)
- 1933–1939: Ironton HS (OH)
- 1940–1942: William & Mary (assistant)
- 1946–1947: William & Mary (assistant)
- 1947–1949: Cleveland Browns (ends)
- 1950–1952: Santa Clara
- 1953: Chicago Cardinals (assistant)

Basketball
- 1933–1940: Ironton HS (OH)
- 1946–1947: William & Mary

Baseball
- 1947: William & Mary

Administrative career (AD unless noted)
- 1954–1959: Cleveland Browns (scout)
- 1967: San Francisco 49ers (scout)
- 1960–1966: Buffalo Bills (GM)
- 1968–1976: Pro Football Hall of Fame (director)

Head coaching record
- Overall: 8–18–2 (college football); 14–12 (college basketball); 14–12 (college baseball)

Richard F. Gallagher (October 28, 1909 – March 29, 1995) was a baseball, basketball and American football coach and administrator who served as an assistant with the Cleveland Browns and Chicago Cardinals of the National Football League (NFL) in the 1940s and 1950s. Gallagher also coached at high schools in his native Ohio and was the head baseball and basketball coach at the College of William & Mary in Virginia from 1946 to 1947. He spent three years as head football coach at Santa Clara University in California in the early 1950s, and ended his career by becoming the general manager of the Buffalo Bills and later the director of the Pro Football Hall of Fame.

Gallagher grew up in Ironton, Ohio and was a star athlete in high school. He attended Kentucky Wesleyan College, where he continued to play sports. After graduation, he played briefly for the semi-professional Ironton Tanks in 1930 before starting a coaching career. He first coached in Pedro, Ohio and then at Ironton High School before getting his first college coaching job in 1940 as an assistant at William & Mary. Gallagher served in the U.S. Navy during World War II, and returned to William & Mary after his discharge in 1945. He was promoted to head coach of the school's baseball and basketball programs the following year, and led the William & Mary Tribe men's basketball team to a 14–12 win–loss record in the 1946–47 season. Gallagher then joined the Browns, where he stayed for three seasons before resigning to take the head coaching job at Santa Clara. He compiled a record of 8–18–2 in three years at Santa Clara.

Gallagher subsequently returned to the Browns as a scout, and remained with the team until 1960, when he became the Bills' general manager. After six years in Buffalo, he resigned to become a scout for the San Francisco 49ers. He stayed in that job for one season before joining the Hall of Fame as the second director in its history. Gallagher retired in 1976. He died of esophageal cancer in 1995.

== Early life and college ==
Gallagher was born and grew up in Ironton, Ohio, a town on the state's border with Kentucky along the Ohio River. He played three sports at his local Ironton High School. After graduating, he attended Kentucky Wesleyan College and played on the school's football team.

== Coaching career ==
Gallagher got his first coaching job at Pedro High School in Pedro, Ohio near his hometown of Ironton after playing briefly for the Ironton Tanks, a semi-professional football team, in 1930. He spent two years there before becoming the head football and basketball coach at Ironton High School in 1933. While at Ironton, he coached future Chicago Bears star halfback George McAfee as the team won the state football championship in 1935. Gallagher left Ironton in 1940 to take a job as an assistant coach for the football, basketball and baseball teams at the College of William & Mary in Virginia.

After two years at William & Mary, Gallagher enlisted in the U.S. Navy in 1942 during World War II. He rose to the rank of lieutenant commander before his discharge in 1945, when he returned to the college and became head baseball and basketball coach in 1946–47. His basketball team had a 14–12 win–loss record that year, and his baseball team was 9–9. He was hired later in 1947 by Paul Brown, the head coach of the Cleveland Browns in the All-America Football Conference (AAFC), as an ends coach. Gallagher replaced Red Conkright, who had taken a job as an assistant with the Buffalo Bills. He spent three seasons in Cleveland, tutoring receivers including Mac Speedie and Dante Lavelli, who was later inducted into the Pro Football Hall of Fame. He also served as a scout for Cleveland. The Browns won the AAFC championship in each of Gallagher's years with the team.

Gallagher took a job in 1950 as head football coach at Santa Clara University in California. He had previously turned down a head coaching job at the University of Pittsburgh, and took over at Santa Clara for Len Casanova when Casanova accepted the Pittsburgh position instead. "Naturally I regret leaving the Browns," Gallagher said at the time. "I realize it is because of my association with Paul Brown that I am getting this opportunity. It looks like an interesting year in professional football coming up and I'd like to be part of it. But everyone has ambitions to become a head coach and this looks like a good opportunity." He was given a three-year contract paying a $12,500 salary.

At Santa Clara, Gallagher brought in Mike Scarry, a former Browns center and Western Reserve University coach, as an assistant. He also hired Ed Ulinski, another former Browns player, as an assistant coach. The Santa Clara Broncos football team had an 8–18–2 record in three seasons under Gallagher.

Gallagher resigned in late 1952 and was expected to rejoin the Browns to do scouting and personnel work. He was hired on a temporary basis to help Cleveland assistant Weeb Ewbank prepare for the NFL draft. In February 1953, however, he signed as an end coach for the NFL's Chicago Cardinals after considering a competing offer to assist Pappy Waldorf at the University of California. Gallagher spent just one season in Chicago, returning to the Browns in 1954 as a part-time scout and personnel expert. He spent the rest of his time working in the sales department of Luria Brothers, a steel dealer. The Browns hired him full-time the following season, promoting him to head the team's scouting department. The Cleveland won the NFL championship in 1954 and 1955.

== Administrative career and hall of fame ==
Gallagher remained with the Browns until 1960, when he was appointed the general manager of the Buffalo Bills, a team in the new American Football League. He was given a $25,000 salary. In 1967, Gallagher was expected to rejoin Brown, who had been fired as Cleveland's coach in 1963 and was starting a new team called the Cincinnati Bengals. He instead took a job as a scout and personnel executive for the San Francisco 49ers that August.

Gallagher stayed in San Francisco for less than a year, taking over in 1968 as director of the Pro Football Hall of Fame in Canton, Ohio after the death of its first director, Dick McCann. He retired in 1976 and said he would spend winters in Florida and the summers in Canton. He died of esophageal cancer in 1995.

== Head coaching record ==
=== College football ===
Year	Team	Overall	Conference	Standing	Bowl/playoffs
Santa Clara Broncos (Independent) (1950–1952)
1950	Santa Clara	3–7			
1951	Santa Clara	3–5–1			
1952	Santa Clara	2–6–1			
Santa Clara:		8–18–2			
Total:		8–18–2			

=== College basketball ===
Record table
Season	Team	Overall	Conference	Standing	Postseason
William & Mary Indians (Southern Conference) (1946–1947)
1946–47	William & Mary	14–12	6–6	9th	
William & Mary:		14–12 (.538)	6–6 (.500)		
Total:		14–12 (.538)			

=== College baseball ===
Record table
Season	Team	Overall	Conference	Standing	Postseason
William & Mary Indians (Southern Conference) (1947)
1947	William & Mary	9–9	4–5		
William & Mary:		9–9	4–5		
Total:		9–9			
