= Lenny Simonetti =

American football player (1919–1973)

- Simonetti during his college career at Tennessee

No. 49
- Position: Tackle

Personal information
- Born: November 20, 1919; Roswell, Ohio, U.S.
- Died: August 14, 1973 (aged 53); Dennison, Ohio, U.S.
- Listed height: 5 ft 11 in (1.80 m)
- Listed weight: 225 lb (102 kg)

Career information
- College: University of Tennessee

Career history
- Cleveland Browns (1946–1948)

Awards and highlights
- 3× AAFC champion (1946, 1947, 1948)

Career statistics
- Games: 28
- Stats at Pro Football Reference

Leonard Patrick "Meatball" Simonetti (November 20, 1919 – August 14, 1973) was an American football tackle who played three seasons in the All-America Football Conference (AAFC) between 1946 and 1948 for the Cleveland Browns. Simonetti was a standout as a fullback at his Ohio high school before switching to tackle while at the University of Tennessee in the late 1930s and early 1940s. After a stint in the U.S. Army during World War II, Simonetti signed with the Browns. Cleveland won the AAFC championship in 1946, repeating in 1947 and 1948. Simonetti was sent to the Baltimore Colts in 1949, but did not play for the team. After leaving football, he became a weighmaster in Ohio. He died of a heart attack in 1973.

== High school and college ==
Simonetti played high school football at New Philadelphia High School in New Philadelphia, Ohio, where he was an all-Ohio fullback on teams coached by John Brickels. He enrolled at the University of Tennessee and continued to play football for the Volunteers between 1939 and 1941. The team finished the 1940 season with an 8–2 win–loss record and advanced to the Sugar Bowl on New Year's Day in 1941, losing 19–13 to Boston College. Simonetti enlisted in the U.S. Army during World War II and served in the Philippines.

== Professional career ==
Brickels, Simonetti's old high school coach, in 1945 became an assistant for the Cleveland Browns, a new team in the All-America Football Conference (AAFC). Brickels recruited Simonetti to play for the team when Simonetti was still serving in the Pacific War. Simonetti joined the Browns when the team started play in 1946, but was a reserve and did not appear in any games during the regular season. Cleveland finished the year with a 12–2 record and advanced to the AAFC championship. Team captain Jim Daniell, however, was dismissed from the team the week before the title game after getting arrested following an altercation with Cleveland police. Cleveland head coach Paul Brown got permission from the league to use Simonetti in the game as Daniell's replacement. The Browns beat the New York Yankees, 14–9.

Simonetti saw more playing time in 1947 after tackle Lou Rymkus suffered an eye infection. The Browns finished the regular season with a 12–1–1 win-loss-tie record and again won the championship. Simonetti stayed with the team for a final season in 1948, when the Browns won all of their games and a third straight championship. After the season, Simonetti was commissioned as deputy sheriff of Tuscarawas County, Ohio. He was sold to the Baltimore Colts in January 1949 along with Ben Pucci and Don Stanton. He left football, however, before playing a game for the team.

== Later life and death ==
After his football career, Simonetti worked as a weighmaster for the state of Ohio in Bolivar. He was injured in a car accident in 1971 and died two years later of a heart attack. He and his wife Florence had one child.
