= John Brickels =

American football coach (1906–1964)

- Brickels in 1946

Personal information
- Born: April 6, 1906; Newark, Ohio, U.S.
- Died: March 17, 1964 (aged 57); Oxford, Ohio, U.S.

Career information
- College: Wittenberg

Career history
- New Philadelphia High (Asst.) 1930–1931; New Philadelphia High (HC) 1932–1938; Huntington High (Asst., HC) 1938–1944; West Virginia (Asst., HC) 1944–1945; Cleveland Browns (Asst.) 1946–1948; Miami University (HC, AD) 1949–1964

Awards and highlights
- 3× AAFC champion (1946, 1947, 1948); Miami Hall of Fame (1971); Wittenberg University Hall of Honor (1986)

John Lewis "Stub" Brickels (April 6, 1906 – March 17, 1964) was a high school, college and professional football coach who served as a backfield coach for the Cleveland Browns between 1946 and 1948. Brickels began his coaching career in 1930, after graduating from Wittenberg University in Ohio, where he was a standout as a halfback on the school's football team. He coached high school football and basketball teams in Ohio and West Virginia in the 1930s and early 1940s before becoming the head basketball coach at the West Virginia University in 1944. He held that post until 1945, when Cleveland Browns coach Paul Brown hired him to recruit players for the Browns, a team under formation in the All-America Football Conference, while Brown served in the U.S. Navy during World War II.

When the Browns began play in 1946, Brickels became the team's backfield coach, holding the post until he was named an assistant football coach at Miami University after the 1948 season. He was promoted to head basketball coach and athletic director the following year, and remained in that position until his death of a heart attack in 1964.

== College career ==
Brickels attended Wittenberg University in Springfield, Ohio, where he played four sports and was a star halfback on the school's football team. He graduated from Wittenberg in 1930 and was a member of Phi Gamma Delta (Fiji).

== Coaching career ==
After graduating from college, Brickels, nicknamed "Stub", was hired as an assistant football and basketball coach at New Philadelphia High School in New Philadelphia, Ohio. He was promoted to head coach of both teams in 1932. During one successful run, his football team won 36 of 40 games. The team played numerous times against dominant Massillon Washington High School squads coached by Paul Brown in the 1930s, although New Philadelphia lost all of the matchups. Brickels went on to become head basketball coach and assistant football coach at Huntington High School in West Virginia in 1938. In 1944, he was named the head basketball coach at the West Virginia University, and led the team to the National Invitation Tournament in 1945.

Paul Brown, who was serving in the U.S. Navy during World War II and coaching a service football team at a base outside Chicago, hired Brickels in 1945 to help him organize the Cleveland Browns, a new team in the All-America Football Conference. Arthur B. McBride, the team's owner, had hired Brown as head coach and general manager, but Brown was hamstrung by his military service and needed Brickels to help recruit players. Brown chose him because of his easygoing and glib manner and familiarity with the Ohio sports scene. Brickels set up an office in downtown Cleveland and visited with players Brown was interested in signing.

Brickels mostly did Brown's bidding and signed numerous players on his behalf, but he also brought two men to Brown's attention who later joined the Browns and had long careers with the team. Center Frank Gatski and guard Ed Ulinski both played at Marshall University in Huntington when Brickels was coaching high school there. Gatski had a Hall of Fame career in 11 seasons for the Browns, and Ulinski played four years for the team before becoming a long-time Browns offensive line coach.

When the Browns started play, Brickels became a backfield coach. He stayed with the Browns for three seasons, after each of which the team won the AAFC championship. Brickels left the Browns in 1949 to take a job as an assistant to football coach Woody Hayes at Miami University. The following year, he was named the school's athletic director and head basketball coach.

== Death ==
Brickels died in 1964 of a heart attack while still the athletic director at Miami. He was inducted into Miami's athletics hall of fame in 1971 and into Wittenberg's hall of honor in 1986.
