= Ed Ulinski =

American football player (1919–2006)

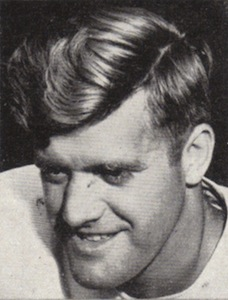
- Ulinski during his military playing career in 1945

No. 36
- Position: Guard

Personal information
- Born: December 7, 1919; Pittsburgh, Pennsylvania, U.S.
- Died: September 17, 2006 (aged 86); Chardon, Ohio, U.S.
- Listed height: 5 ft 11 in (1.80 m)
- Listed weight: 203 lb (92 kg)

Career information
- College: Marshall University

Career history

Playing
- Cleveland Browns (1946–1949)

Coaching
- University of Santa Clara, Asst. (1950–1952); Purdue University, Asst. (1953); Cleveland Browns, OL (1954–1963); Cleveland Browns, LB (1963–1971); Cleveland Browns, Film coord. (1971–1984)

Awards and highlights
- 4× AAFC champion (1946, 1947, 1948, 1949); 2× Second-team All-Pro (1946, 1948)

Career statistics
- Games: 54
- Stats at Pro Football Reference

Edward Franklin Ulinski (December 7, 1919 – September 17, 2006) was an American professional football guard who played four seasons for the Cleveland Browns in the All-America Football Conference (AAFC) and went on to a career as an assistant coach for the Browns that lasted more than three decades.

Ulinski grew up in Pennsylvania and attended Marshall University in West Virginia, where he starred as a blocker and end. He then served for four years in the U.S. Air Force during World War II, playing for military football teams in 1944 and 1945. He signed with the Browns in 1946 and played as a guard as the team won four straight AAFC championships. He retired after the 1949 season to begin a coaching career, working first at Santa Clara University for three years before taking an assistant coaching job at Purdue University.

Paul Brown, the head coach of the Browns, hired Ulinski in 1954 to work with the team's linemen. Ulinski changed to the Browns' linebackers coach in 1963 after Brown was fired and Blanton Collier replaced him. He later served as an administrative coaching aide and the Browns' film coordinator before retiring in 1984. The Browns won three National Football League championships during Ulinski's coaching career, in 1954, 1955 and 1964. He was inducted into Marshall's athletics hall of fame in 1986. Ulinski died in 2006 after a bout with Alzheimer's disease.

== Early life and college career ==
Ulinski was born in Pittsburgh and attended Ambridge Area High School in Ambridge, Pennsylvania. After graduating, he went to Marshall University in West Virginia, where he played as a blocking back and an end on the school's football team opposite Frank Gatski, later a teammate on the Cleveland Browns. Ulinski was named to an all-West Virginia team in 1940, and was selected as a little All-American in 1941. He joined the U.S. Air Force in 1942 during World War II and played for the Second Air Force Super-Bombers football team as a blocking back in 1944. He was shifted to guard in the middle of that season, where he played for the remainder of his career. Ulinski played for a Fourth Air Force football team in 1945.

== Professional career ==
John Brickels, an assistant coach for the Cleveland Browns in the new All-America Football Conference (AAFC), noticed Ulinski when he was playing at Marshall. Brickels had been a high school coach in Huntington, West Virginia, where Marshall is located, and saw him in action again when he played for the Super-Bombers. At Brickels' urging, Ulinski signed with the Browns in 1946. The Browns finished that season with a 12–2 record and went on to win the first AAFC championship. Ulinski was named a second-team All-Pro. Cleveland won the AAFC championship again in 1947, when Ulinski began playing middle linebacker on defense in addition to his role on the offensive line. Paul Brown, the coach of the Browns, called him the best offensive guard in the AAFC, and said the team "discovered he is about as good a middle line backer as we have on the team".

Cleveland had a perfect season in 1948, winning all of its games, and Ulinski again was named a second-team All-Pro. The Browns repeated as the league's champions for a fourth year in a row in 1949, Ulinski's last season in professional football.

== Coaching career ==
=== College ===
Ulinski retired after the 1949 season and began a coaching career, accepting a job working under former Browns teammate Mike Scarry at Santa Clara University in California. Scarry had left a job at Cleveland's Western Reserve University to take the head coaching job at Santa Clara. In 1953, he was hired as an assistant line coach by Purdue University in Indiana.

=== Professional ===
The following year, Brown hired Ulinski to replace Weeb Ewbank as the team's tackles coach after Ewbank resigned to become head coach of the Baltimore Colts. "We've looked forward to the day when Ulinski would return to our organization as a coach", Brown said after the signing, calling him a "fine student of football" and a player who could teach the game well. The Browns, who by the time Ulinski joined as a coach had moved to the National Football League (NFL), won championships in both of Ulinski's first two years as an assistant under Brown.

Paul Brown was fired 1963, two years after Art Modell took ownership of the team, but Ulinski stayed on the staff. Under his successor, former assistant Blanton Collier, worked primarily as a linebackers coach. The Browns won another championship while Ulinski was with the team in 1964.

Ulinski continued as the linebackers coach and worked as an administrative coaching aide until 1971, when he was named the team's film coordinator. He held that position until he retired in 1984, having spent more than 30 years with the Browns as a player and coach. During his time in Cleveland, Ulinski coached numerous offensive linemen and linebackers who were fixtures of the Browns' successful teams of the 1950s and 1960s, including Gatski, Lou Groza, Dick Schafrath, Abe Gibron, Mike McCormack and Gene Hickerson. Gatski, Groza, McCormack and Hickerson were all later inducted into the Pro Football Hall of Fame.

== Later life and death ==
Ulinski was inducted into Marshall University's athletic hall of fame in 1986 and the Beaver County, Pennsylvania sports hall of fame in 1990. He suffered from Alzheimer's disease in his later years and died in 2006 at a nursing home in Chardon, Ohio.
