= Tommy Colella =

American football player (1918–1992)

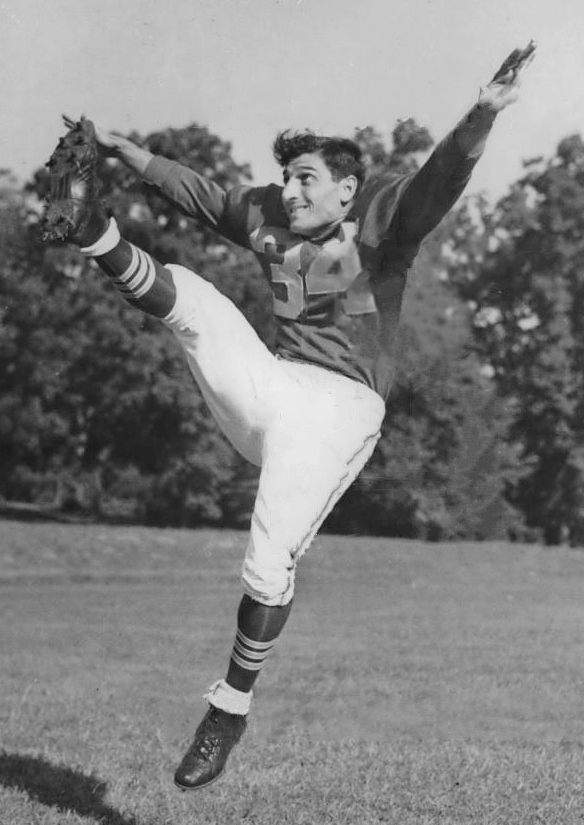
- Colella in 1944

No. 46, 92, 34, 88
- Positions: Halfback, Punter, Safety

Personal information
- Born: July 3, 1918; Albion, New York, U.S.
- Died: May 15, 1992 (aged 73); Hamburg, New York, U.S.
- Listed height: 6 ft 0 in (1.83 m)
- Listed weight: 187 lb (85 kg)

Career information
- High school: Albion
- College: Canisius (1939-1941)
- NFL draft: 1942: 7th round, 55th overall pick

Career history
- Detroit Lions (1942–1943); Cleveland Rams (1944–1945); Cleveland Browns (1946–1948); Buffalo Bills (1949)

Awards and highlights
- NFL champion (1945); 3× AAFC champion (1946–1948); AAFC interceptions leaders (1946, 1947 (Note: co-leader this season)); Second-team Little All-American (1940)

Career NFL/AAFC statistics
- Rushing yards: 753
- Rushing touchdowns: 8
- Receiving yards: 215
- Receiving touchdowns: 5
- Punting yards: 7,372
- Punting average: 37.4
- Interceptions: 26
- Interception yards: 386
- Stats at Pro Football Reference

Thomas Anthony Colella (July 3, 1918 – May 15, 1992) was an American professional football halfback, punter and safety who played in the National Football League (NFL) and All-America Football Conference (AAFC) for the Detroit Lions, the Cleveland Rams, the Cleveland Browns and the Buffalo Bills.

Colella grew up in New York and was a high school football star in his hometown of Albion, New York. He played four years of college football at Canisius College before being drafted by the NFL's Detroit Lions. He was on the Lions' roster for two years, after which he moved to the Rams in 1945 and the Browns of the AAFC in 1946. Colella stayed with the Browns for three years, in each of which the team won the AAFC championship. He spent the 1949 season with the Buffalo Bills before leaving football.

== Early life and college ==
Colella grew up in Albion, New York, and played three sports at the city's Charles D'Amico High School. Was referenced as "The Albion Antelope." After graduating, he attended Canisius College in Buffalo, New York, where he was a versatile football player for four years. He was a running back, quarterback, defensive back, kicker and kick-return man at the school, and won Little All-America honors three years in a row. He returned a kickoff for a touchdown and kicked two extra points in a Canisius Golden Griffins win over the then-undefeated Long Island Blackbirds in 1940.

== Professional career ==
Colella was drafted in the seventh round by the National Football League's Detroit Lions in 1942, and played two seasons for the team. The Cleveland Rams acquired him in 1944. He played as a halfback and punter for the Rams, who won the NFL championship in 1945. The Cleveland Browns, a new team under formation in the All-America Football Conference, signed Colella soon after the 1945 season ended. He was among five players who joined the Browns when the Rams moved to Los Angeles before the 1946 season; the others were Chet Adams, Don Greenwood, Mike Scarry and Gaylon Smith.

With the Browns, Colella was a punter and defensive halfback between 1946 and 1948. Colella had 10 interceptions in 1946, leading the AAFC. Cleveland coach Paul Brown said in 1948 that Colella provided "the type of punt we want against such dangerous receivers as the Rockets and Buffalo Bills have. All of his kicks have gone out of bounds, and our opponents have gained exactly no yards on returns in the last two games." Cleveland won the AAFC championship in each of the three seasons he was with the team.

Colella was traded to the Buffalo Bills in May 1949 along with Chet Adams, his former Rams teammate. "We have won three championships, but we can't remain at a standstill," Brown said. He played one season for the Bills before leaving football.

== Later life and death ==
In the 1950s, Colella stayed in Buffalo and worked as a salesman. Colella was inducted into the Canisius College Athletics Hall of Fame as part of its inaugural class in 1963. He was inducted into the Greater Buffalo Sports Hall of Fame in 2002, ten years after his death.
