= Gaylon Smith =

American football player (1916–1958)

- Smith at Rhodes College in 1936

No. 10, 49, 74
- Positions: Back, Defensive end

Personal information
- Born: July 15, 1916; Lonoke, Arkansas, US
- Died: March 10, 1958 (aged 41); Cleveland, Ohio, US
- Listed height: 5 ft 11 in (1.80 m)
- Listed weight: 202 lb (92 kg)

Career information
- High school: Beebe (Beebe, Arkansas); Lonoke
- College: Southwestern (TN) (1935-1938)
- NFL draft: 1939: 2nd round, 13th overall pick

Career history
- Cleveland Rams (1939–1942); Cleveland Browns (1946)

Awards and highlights
- AAFC champion (1946); First-team Little All-American (1938); Second-team All-Southern (1938); 2× All-Dixie (1937, 1938)

Career NFL/AAFC statistics
- Rushing yards: 710
- Rushing touchdowns: 9
- Receptions: 15
- Receiving yards: 256
- Passing yards: 202
- TD-INT: 2-4
- Stats at Pro Football Reference

Gaylon Wesley Smith (July 15, 1916 – March 10, 1958) was an American professional football player who was a back and defensive end for five seasons with the Cleveland Rams of the National Football League (NFL) and one season for the Cleveland Browns of the All-America Football Conference (AAFC). Before entering professional football, Smith starred as a halfback playing college football for the Southwestern Lynx (now Rhodes Lynx) and led the country in scoring in 1938. He was selected by the Rams in the second round of the 1939 NFL draft and played for the Cleveland team until deciding to retire from the sport in 1943. After taking a job as a personnel director and playing on a regional basketball and baseball teams based in the Cleveland area, Smith joined the U.S. Navy in 1944 during World War II. He was discharged two years later and signed with the Browns, then a new team in the AAFC. Smith was a second-string player with the Browns but substituted for an injured Marion Motley late in the season as the team won the AAFC championship game. Smith retired after the 1946 season but stayed in Ohio to raise his family and work as a manufacturer's representative. He died in 1958 at the age of 41.

== College career ==
Smith grew up in Beebe, Arkansas and attended Rhodes College in Memphis, Tennessee starting in 1935. He played baseball, basketball and track in college, but he was best known as a star halfback on the school's football team. While Rhodes was a small college, Smith led the country in scoring for two weeks in 1938 and finished the season in third place. He was named to All-Dixie teams in 1937 and 1938, and was named a Little All-American in 1938. The Cleveland Rams selected him in the second round of 1939 NFL draft.

== Professional career ==
Smith played for the Rams beginning in 1939. He started out as a halfback, but was shifted to quarterback and then tailback in the 1940 season before moving back to quarterback. He then served primarily as a fullback in 1941 and 1942, and like many players of his era was assigned to both the offensive and defensive units.

Smith retired from football after the 1942 season and took a job as personnel director of Thompson Products, Inc., an aerospace, automotive and financial conglomerate based in Ohio. Smith played amateur baseball as a catcher and regional professional basketball in 1943. He also boxed in an amateur tournament organized by the Cleveland Plain Dealer.

The following year, Smith joined the U.S. Navy during World War II. He reported in May for training at the Great Lakes Naval Station outside of Chicago. At Great Lakes, he played for a military football team coached by Paul Brown.

Following his discharge from the service in early 1946, Smith was signed by Brown to play for the Cleveland Browns, a team under formation in the new All-America Football Conference. The Rams had moved to Los Angeles after the 1945 season, and Smith was one of five former Rams players to stay in Cleveland with the Browns, alongside Tommy Colella, Mike Scarry, Don Greenwood and Chet Adams. He joined the Browns despite a lawsuit filed by the Rams against Adams in which the Rams contended he was still under contract with the team. Smith said he had signed with the "Cleveland Rams" and that the contract said nothing about a move to Los Angeles. "After the Rams moved to the coast, they sent me another agreement specifying a raise in pay, but I didn't sign it," he said. "I decided that if I couldn't play football in Cleveland, I wouldn't play at all." A federal judge eventually ruled in favor of Adams, clearing the way for former Rams players to join the Browns.

Smith was not a regular starter for the Browns when the team started play in 1946, but he got additional playing time toward the end of the season after fullback Marion Motley suffered injuries to his feet. Smith ran for 240 yards and scored five touchdowns as the Browns won the first AAFC championship that year. He retired from professional football for good after the season.

== Later life ==
Smith was associated in the mid-1950s with a company started by Browns quarterback Otto Graham and Cleveland Indians catcher Jim Hegan that sold gift items including trophies, watches and jewelry to companies for presentation to clients. He also worked for Thompson Products and the National Screw Company as a manufacturer's representative. Smith died in 1958 in Ohio, where he had remained with his family after retiring from football. He had four children with his wife Carol.

Two years after his death, Rhodes College dedicated the Gaylon Smith Memorial Gateway in his honor. He is considered one of the best football players Rhodes has produced. He was inducted into the Rhodes College Athletic Hall of Fame in 1996.
