= Marty Feldman (American football) =

American football player and coach (1922–2015)

Personal information
- Born: September 12, 1922; Los Angeles, California, U.S.
- Died: December 5, 2015 (aged 93); Los Gatos, California, U.S.

Career information
- College: Stanford

Career history
- Stanford (1948–1954) freshman coach; New Mexico (1955) offensive line coach; San Jose State (1957–1959) offensive line coach; Oakland Raiders (1960) offensive line coach; Oakland Raiders (1961–1962) head coach

Head coaching record
- Regular season: 2–15 (.118)
- Coaching profile at Pro Football Reference

Other information
- Military career
- Allegiance: United States
- Branch: United States Marine Corps
- Rank: Corporal
- Conflicts: World War II
- Awards: Purple Heart (3)

Martin Feldman (September 12, 1922 – December 5, 2015) was an American football player and coach who served as the second head coach of the American Football League's Oakland Raiders. He became head coach on September 18, 1961, following the dismissal of Eddie Erdelatz. His overall record as head coach was 2–15. He was succeeded by Red Conkright on October 16, 1962.

Born in Los Angeles, California, Feldman played college football at Stanford University, where he played guard. He also played on the school's rugby team, and was named to the Stanford Athletic Hall of Fame for that sport. Feldman served in the United States Marines during World War II and earned three Purple Hearts. He died in Los Gatos, California on December 5, 2015, at the age of 93.

== Head coaching record ==
=== AFL ===
Team	Year	Regular season					Postseason			
Team	Year	Won	Lost	Ties	Win %	Finish	Won	Lost	Win %	Result
OAK	1961	2	10	0	.167	4th in AFL Western	–	–	–	–
OAK	1962	0	5	0	.000	–	–	–	–	–
		2	15	0	.118		–	–	–	
