= George Young (American football player) =

American football player (1924–1969)

- Young while playing for the Cleveland Browns

No. 52, 82
- Position: Defensive end

Personal information
- Born: May 10, 1924; Wilkes-Barre, Pennsylvania, U.S.
- Died: September 21, 1969 (aged 45); Chicago, Illinois, U.S.
- Listed height: 6 ft 3 in (1.91 m)
- Listed weight: 214 lb (97 kg)

Career information
- High school: Forty Fort
- College: Baldwin–Wallace; Georgia

Career history
- Cleveland Browns (1946–1953)

Awards and highlights
- NFL champion (1950); 4× AAFC champion (1946, 1947, 1948, 1949)

Career statistics
- Games: 97
- Stats at Pro Football Reference
- Coaching profile at Pro Football Reference

George Donald Young (May 10, 1924 – September 21, 1969) was an American football defensive end who played eight seasons in the All-America Football Conference (AAFC) and in the National Football League (NFL) with the Cleveland Browns. He later was an umpire officiating in the American Football League (AFL) for its entire existence, from 1960 through 1969. He officiated in the first AFL championship in 1960 and the first Super Bowl after the 1966 season.

Young grew up in a poor family outside of Wilkes-Barre, Pennsylvania. He was a star athlete in high school, playing on his football team and winning a state heavyweight title in wrestling as a senior. Young attended the University of Georgia and was on the Bulldogs football team in 1941 and 1942, when the school won the Rose Bowl. He then spent three years in the military during World War II and played service football as he trained in the U.S. Navy. He played in 1944 for Paul Brown, then the head football coach at a Naval facility outside Chicago. After the war, Brown became head coach of the Cleveland Browns in the AAFC and signed Young. He played on the defensive line for the Browns until his retirement in 1953, a span during which the team won five league championships. After his playing career, Young worked as an executive at a utility in Illinois and officiated in the AFL. He died of a brain tumor in 1969.

== Early life and college career ==
Young grew up poor in Forty Fort, Pennsylvania, a suburb of Wilkes-Barre. His mother died when he was 10 years old, and dinner often consisted of canned beans or soup. Despite a bad diet, Young grew to six feet, three inches and more than 200 pounds. He played three years as an end on his Forty Fort High School football team and was also a wrestler, winning the state heavyweight title as a senior.

The head of a soft drink bottling company in Wilkes-Barre helped Young get into the University of Georgia, where he played football on the varsity team starting as a freshman. He was on a Georgia Bulldogs football team that won the Rose Bowl after the 1942 season.

Soon after the game, Young entered the U.S. military as America's involvement in World War II intensified. He was sent as a Navy cadet to Great Lakes Naval Station near Chicago and played on a service football team there coached by Paul Brown in 1944. The following year, he was transferred to Fleet City, a complex of Naval bases in California, and played on a Fleet City Bluejackets team that won the service national championship.

At Fleet City, doctors discovered Young had a large growth of calcium on his right thigh bone. They wanted to operate and thought it would grow larger, but told Young he would lose significant use of his leg after surgery. He elected not to have the operation and hope for the best. The deposit grew to 9 1/2 inches before it stopped; it did not affect his ability to run.

== Cleveland Browns ==
After the war, Paul Brown became the head coach of the Cleveland Browns, a professional team under formation in the new All-America Football Conference. He invited Young to try out for the squad. Young barely made the team and played sparingly in the Browns' first season in 1946, when the team won the first AAFC championship.

Young almost failed make the roster again in 1947, but thereafter became a stalwart on the Browns' defensive line as a defensive end whose job it was to disrupt opponents' running and passing attacks. The Browns won the following three AAFC championships, helped by a staunch defense and a high-scoring offense featuring quarterback Otto Graham and fullback Marion Motley. Young continued his academic studies during the offseason – his career at Georgia was cut short by the war – and received a degree from Baldwin–Wallace College in 1949.

The AAFC disbanded after the 1949 season and the Browns were absorbed by the more established National Football League (NFL). Young continued to play for the Browns as the team won the 1950 NFL championship and advanced to the championship but lost in each of the ensuing three years. Young announced his retirement after the 1953 season, when he shared playing time with rookie Doug Atkins at left defensive end.

== Later life and officiating career ==
Young worked during the off-season in his last two years with the Browns at the Public Service Company of Northern Illinois in its personnel department. He took a full-time job with the utilities company after leaving football and settled in Waukegan, Illinois. "I liked the work from what I saw of it the last couple of years and I've decided to devote full time to it now", he said.

Young came back to professional football in 1960, when he was hired as an official in the new American Football League (AFL). He continued his regular job as an area manager for the utility in Illinois while officiating games part-time. He served as the umpire in the AFL's first championship between the Houston Oilers and the Los Angeles Chargers. In 1966, he was the umpire in Super Bowl I, the first inter-league title game between the champions of the AFL and NFL.

Young died suddenly in 1969 of a brain tumor at 45. He was an AFL official for the league's entire existence; the AFL and NFL formally merged starting in the 1970 season. He was survived by his wife, Norma Young, and daughters Sally and Diane.

== See also ==
- List of American Football League officials
