= Fred Evans (running back) =

American football player (1921–2007)

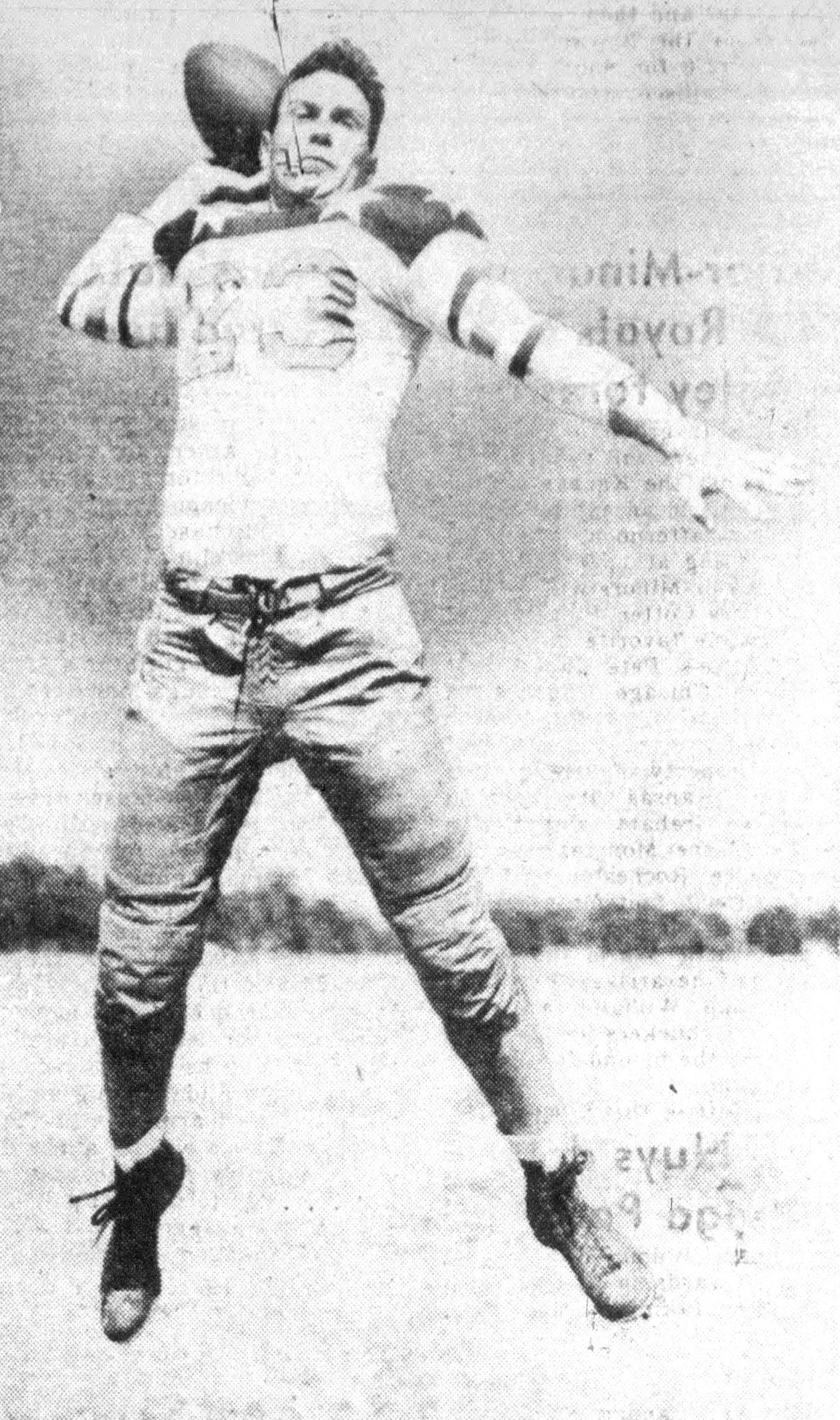
- Evans, c. 1945

No. 99, 85, 83, 75, 11
- Position: Halfback

Personal information
- Born: May 23, 1921; Grand Rapids, Michigan, U.S.
- Died: June 21, 2007 (aged 86); Cleveland, Ohio, U.S.
- Listed height: 5 ft 11 in (1.80 m)
- Listed weight: 185 lb (84 kg)

Career information
- High school: Riley (South Bend, Indiana)
- College: Notre Dame (1939–1942)
- NFL draft: 1943: 3rd round, 24th overall pick

Career history
- Cleveland Browns (1946); Buffalo Bills (1947); Chicago Rockets (1947); Chicago Bears (1948); Chicago Rockets (1948)

Awards and highlights
- AAFC champion (1946)

Career NFL/AAFC statistics
- Rushing yards: 166
- Rushing average: 3.4
- Receptions: 7
- Receiving yards: 89
- Total touchdowns: 4
- Stats at Pro Football Reference

Frederick Owen "Dippy" Evans Jr. (May 23, 1921 – June 21, 2007) was an American professional football halfback who played for three years in the All-America Football Conference (AAFC) and the National Football League (NFL) in the late 1940s.

Evans grew up in South Bend, Indiana and attended James Whitcomb Riley High School. He went to the University of Notre Dame and played halfback and fullback on the school's football team starting in 1940. After graduating from college, Evans joined the United States Army Air Corps during World War II, where he stayed until his discharge in 1945. He then signed with the Browns, a team in the new AAFC, where he played for one year. He subsequently played for the Buffalo Bills, the Chicago Bears and the Chicago Rockets in 1947 and 1948.

Evans moved to Cleveland after his playing career and owned a dry cleaning business. He died in 2007.

== Early life ==
Evans was born in Grand Rapids, Michigan and moved to Detroit before his family settled in South Bend, Indiana. Evans attended James Whitcomb Riley High School in South Bend, where he played football, baseball, basketball and track. He was named an all-state halfback in his senior year.

== College and military career ==
Evans attended the University of Notre Dame, where he played at left halfback for the school's football team starting as a sophomore in 1940. He moved to fullback the following year, when Notre Dame went undefeated under coach Frank Leahy. Evans led the team in rushing yards and scoring in 1941.

Evans was considered shy but tough. Before a game against the University of Southern California (USC) in 1941, Bill Riordan, a teammate, poured a bucket of water over Evans's head. Evans tried to retaliate but crashed into a wall and split his knee open. He concealed the injury from Leahy and played in the USC game, but needed 11 stitches afterward.

After graduating in 1942, Evans was drafted in the third round of the 1943 NFL draft by the Chicago Bears of the National Football League. His professional football career, however, was delayed by service in World War II. Evans signed up for the United States Army Air Corps and flew P-51 Mustangs with the Flying Tigers, a unit that defended China against Japanese incursion during the war. While in the air corps, Evans played for the Randolph Field Ramblers, a military team at Randolph Air Force Base in San Antonio, Texas. Randolph won the national service title in 1944, when Evans was on the team.

== Professional career ==
In 1945, Evans became the fourth player signed by the Cleveland Browns, a team under formation in the new All-America Football Conference, which was to start play in 1946. Evans was the first player to score points for the Browns in their inaugural exhibition game on August 30 against the Brooklyn Dodgers at the Akron Rubber Bowl. He scored a touchdown on a seven-yard pass from quarterback Cliff Lewis; he later intercepted a pass and returned it 83 yards for another touchdown. Later in the season, Evans twisted his knee and was sidelined for more than a month. The Browns went on to win the first AAFC championship in 1946.

Before the beginning of the 1947 season, Evans was sent to the Buffalo Bills in a special draft designed to help the AAFC's weaker teams. He played for the Chicago Rockets and Chicago Bears in 1947 and 1948. In 1948, Evans became the first player to have two scoop-and-score touchdown returns in a single game—a feat that would not be repeated for 71 years.

== Later life and death ==
Evans came back to Cleveland after his football career and owned a dry cleaning business, with his wife Dorothy Evans, called Handee Cleaners in the city's West Park area. He transferred ownership of the business to his son Mark after he retired. Evans died in 2007. He had five children With Dorothy Jane Evans: Fred, Mark, Pat, Mimi, and Pam.
