= Bill Lund =

American football player (1924–2008)

- Lund in 1946

No. 82
- Position: Halfback

Personal information
- Born: October 27, 1924; Akron, Ohio, U.S.
- Died: September 27, 2008 (aged 83); Chagrin Falls, Ohio, U.S.
- Listed height: 5 ft 10 in (1.78 m)
- Listed weight: 180 lb (82 kg)

Career information
- High school: Cuyahoga Falls (Cuyahoga Falls, Ohio)
- College: Case Institute of Technology
- NFL draft: 1945: 15th round, 147th overall pick

Career history
- Cleveland Browns (1946-1947)

Awards and highlights
- 2× AAFC champion (1946, 1947)

Career AAFC statistics
- Rushing yards: 177
- Rushing average: 4.8
- Receptions: 10
- Receiving yards: 174
- Total touchdowns: 6
- Stats at Pro Football Reference

William Harold Lund (October 27, 1924 – September 27, 2008) was an American professional football player who was a halfback for two seasons for the Cleveland Browns in the All-America Football Conference (AAFC).

Lund grew up in Cuyahoga Falls, Ohio and went to the Case School of Applied Science in Cleveland, Ohio. He was a star on his college football, basketball and track teams. He was a triple threat man in football, playing halfback and fullback. In track, he set and still holds school records in the 100-yard dash and long jump. His 110-yard dash time of 9.7 was set in 1945, and will never be broken as 110-yard dash is no longer run. He won the U.S. amateur championship in 1944 in the long jump. After a short stint in the U.S. Navy, Lund was selected in 1945 by the Cleveland Rams of the National Football League (NFL). He signed instead to play for the Browns, a team under formation in the new AAFC. After two years with the Browns, in both of which the team won the AAFC championship, he was traded to the Chicago Rockets. Lund, however, elected to leave professional football to work as an engineer. He was later an assistant coach at Case, his alma mater.

== College and professional career ==
Lund grew up in Cuyahoga Falls, Ohio and played football briefly in high school. He graduated and attended the Case School of Applied Science in Cleveland, Ohio starting in 1942, playing on the school's football, basketball and track teams. As a sophomore in 1943 he became a primary halfback on Case's football team and was touted as an emerging triple threat man.

Lund joined the U.S. Navy during World War II, but was allowed to stay at Case and study engineering as part of the Navy's V-12 training program. In the summer of 1944, he won the U.S. long jump title at the Amateur Athletic Union track and field championships in New York City. Lund set school records in the long jump, with 23 feet and 7 inches, and the 100-yard dash, with a time of 9.7 seconds. In the 1944 football season, Lund was moved from halfback to fullback. Later in the season, he became the team's primary passer while continuing to run the ball and kick.

Lund was selected in the 15th round by the National Football League's Cleveland Rams with the 147th pick in the 1945 NFL draft. Lund was still in the military in 1945, however, stationed at a base in San Diego, California and playing for the Fleet City Blue Jackets, a service team in San Diego. Upon his discharge in the summer of 1946, Lund signed with the Cleveland Browns, a team under formation in the new All-America Football Conference (AAFC). After injuries sidelined two of the team's starting halfbacks in 1946, head coach Paul Brown said Lund would be used more frequently. He got off to a strong start playing alongside fullback Marion Motley, the team's primary running threat. He suffered an ankle injury later in the season, however, as the Browns went on to win the 1946 AAFC championship.

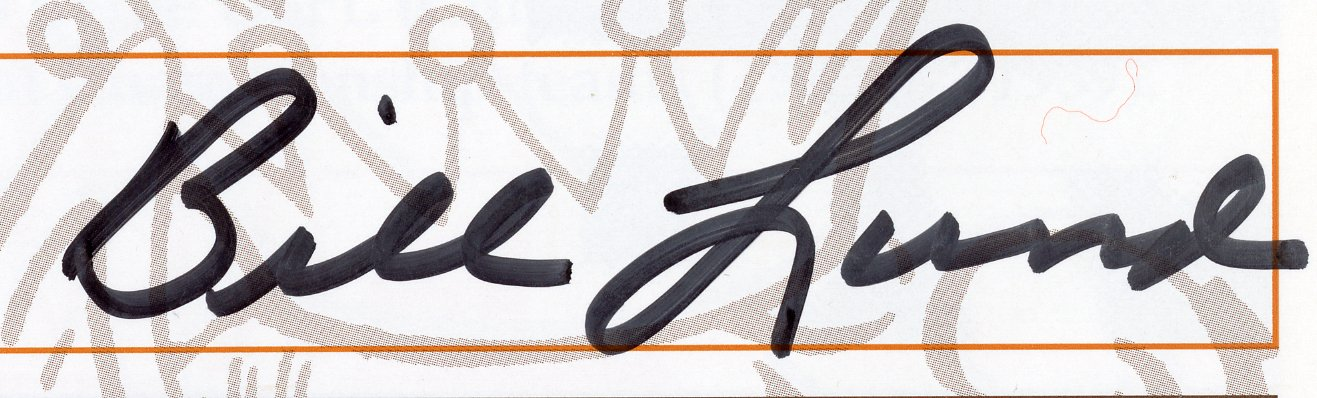

Lund got married in May 1947 to Nancy Ann Faris of Lorain, Ohio. He was introduced to his wife, a nurse, by teammate Robert Kolesar, who practiced medicine in the offseason. He also worked as an engineer in the offseason at Thompson Products, an aerospace and automotive conglomerate based in Euclid, Ohio. Near the beginning of the 1947 season, Lund broke his left thumb crashing into the stands after returning an interception for a touchdown against the AAFC's Brooklyn Dodgers. He missed three games and returned in October 1947. The Browns again won the AAFC championship that year.

Before the beginning of the 1948 season, the Browns traded Lund and guard Joe Signaigo to the Chicago Rockets for guard Alex Agase and tackle Chubby Grigg. Lund did not play for the Rockets, however, quitting professional football to take a job as an engineer.

== Later career ==
Lou Saban, Lund's teammate on the Browns, became Case's head football coach in 1950 and hired Lund to coach the freshman team. Lund later worked at Howmet Corporation in New Jersey and Cleveland's Sherwood Refractory. In 1979, he co-founded Concorde Castings, an aerospace components manufacturer, and was its chief executive officer until his retirement in 1995. Lund was a cousin of Pug Lund, a star at the University of Minnesota who was inducted into the College Football Hall of Fame. He died in 2008.
