= Greater Cleveland Sports Hall of Fame =

The Greater Cleveland Sports Hall of Fame is a nonprofit organization in Cleveland, Ohio.

The Hall of Fame started as a bicentennial project in 1976, being established as non-profit. The first class in 1976 included 151 inductees while recent years have seen eight inductees per year.

It was established in 1976 to honor Greater Clevelanders who were outstanding in sport. Greater Cleveland is defined as Ashtabula, Cuyahoga, Geauga, Lake, Summit, Portage, Stark, Lorain and Medina counties. Inductees must have been raised in Greater Cleveland or have become residents of Greater Cleveland. Inductees must have also been retired for at least three years or, if still actively playing, must have competed at a quality level in their sport for at least 12 years. New members are honored at an annual induction ceremony.

This year's ceremony will take place at the Urban Community School, the brand new home for The Hall, on Tuesday, Dec. 2. The reception begins at 6:00 p.m.; dinner at 7:00 p.m. and program 8:00 p.m. This year's class includes Wanda Ford, Tianna Madison, Stipe Miocic, Chris Spielman and Jack Turben.

As of 2025, there are over 550 inductees across 30 different categories.

Inductees receive a plaque with a line drawing of the inductee and the sport they represent, presented at an annual ceremony. Copies of many of these plaques will be found at the brand physical hall.

== Jack Herrick Youth Sports Fund ==
The JHYSF supports non-profit youth-oriented sports organizations that provide opportunities for local youth of all backgrounds.

The accomplishments and stories of the GCLESHOF inductees provide inspiration for young athletes to pursue their dreams in sport. The GCLESHOF fosters those dreams by providing grant funding to qualified youth sports organizations in the Greater Cleveland area.

The financial commitment, through the JHYSF, is intended to fund specific, one-time capital or project-based needs of amateur, non-governmental youth sports organizations in the region that provide opportunity for youth of all backgrounds to participate safely in sports. Grants are awarded annually, and preference each year will go to organizations that have not previously been funded. Grant applications will be announced at the annual induction ceremony.

In 2025, EMPOWER SPORTS (www.empowersports.org) and Rec2Connect (www.rec2connect.org) are the two recipients of the Jack Herrick Youth Sports Fund grants.

== Urban Community School ==
Ceremonies for the GCLESHOF inductions will take place at Urban Community School's Roundstone Athletic Center, home to the new GCLESHOF and museum on Cleveland's West Side.

The direct location is: Urban Community School Roundstone Athletic Center, 2025 W. 47th St., Cleveland.
