= Arthur B. McBride =

American sports team owner (1888–1972)

- McBride testifying before the Kefauver Committee, 1951
- Born: March 20, 1888; Chicago, Illinois, U.S.
- Died: November 10, 1972 (aged 84); Cleveland, Ohio, U.S.
- Occupations: Businessman, original owner of the Cleveland Browns of the AAFC and the NFL
- Spouse: Mary Jane Kane
- Children: 3

Arthur B. "Mickey" McBride (March 20, 1888 – November 10, 1972) was the founder of the Cleveland Browns professional American football team in the All-America Football Conference (AAFC) and National Football League (NFL). During McBride's tenure as owner of the Browns from 1944 to 1953, the team won five championships in seven appearances, by far the most successful period for any Cleveland sports team in the city's modern history.

McBride was also a real estate developer and investor active in Cleveland, Chicago and Florida. He owned taxi-cab companies in Cleveland and a horse racing news wire that sold information to bookmakers. He had ties to organized crime figures arising from the wire service, but was never arrested or convicted of a crime.

== Early career ==
McBride was born in Chicago, where he worked as a newsboy from the age of six. His first real job was for publishing tycoon William Randolph Hearst's organization in Los Angeles, San Francisco, Boston and Chicago. He moved to Cleveland in 1913, when he was in his mid-twenties, to be circulation manager for the Cleveland News. It was a time when circulation battles over newsstands and street corners often turned violent. He started with the News on a $10,000 salary ($325,758 in today's dollars) and was charged with organizing the paper's newsboys. "This meant choosing strong young men comfortable fighting with fists, clubs, knives, chains and, when they could get them, handguns," author Ted Schwarz wrote. "They were the business equivalent of the street gang, and McBride's salary depended on how well he organized his newsboys to avoid losing their corners to one or more violent rivals."

Having built up a fortune in newspapers and purchased apartment buildings in the Cleveland suburb of Lakewood, McBride in 1930 went into business for himself. In 1931, he bought a majority stake in Cleveland's Zone Cab Company, which later merged with the Yellow Cab Company to form the city's biggest taxi operator. He also had taxi businesses in Akron and Canton, two cities southeast of Cleveland. As his taxi businesses prospered, McBride invested in real estate in Cleveland, Chicago and Florida. In the late 1930s, he leveraged his newspaper connections to launch a wire service that supplied bookmakers with the results of horse races. This put him in contact with organized crime figures who were behind gambling operations that relied on such services. He invested in the Continental Press and Empire News, both based in Cleveland and run by mobsters Morris "Mushy" Wexler and Sam "Gameboy" Miller. James Ragen, another friend and associate in the wire business, was murdered in 1946 in a Chicago gangland feud. A federal grand jury in 1940 indicted 18 people, including McBride and Wexler, over the supply of information used in gambling. The allegations were based on federal laws that forbade interstate transmission of lottery results; prosecutors treated the race results as lottery lists. He was never arrested or tried over his role in the business, however.

== Cleveland Browns ==
McBride was a fan of boxing and baseball, but knew little about football. He only grew interested in the sport in 1940, when his son Arthur Jr. was a student the University of Notre Dame and he attended Notre Dame Fighting Irish football games in South Bend, Indiana. He was drawn by the excitement that surrounded football and thought a professional team could be profitable. In 1942, McBride made overtures to supermarket heir Dan Reeves about buying his Cleveland Rams, a National Football League team, but Reeves rebuffed him. In 1944, however, Chicago Tribune sports editor Arch Ward proposed a new professional league called the All-America Football Conference. McBride, who knew Ward from his days in the newspaper business, eagerly signed on as the owner of the eight-team circuit's Cleveland franchise.

McBride first set his sights on Notre Dame's Frank Leahy as his team's head coach, and the two men shook hands on a deal to make him coach and general manager. Not wanting to lose Leahy, however, Notre Dame's president objected and McBride backed off. He then asked Cleveland Plain Dealer sportswriter John Dietrich who he should hire. Dietrich suggested Paul Brown, the Ohio State Buckeyes coach who was then serving in the U.S. Navy and coaching a team at the Great Lakes Naval Training Station outside of Chicago. With his limited football knowledge, McBride had never heard of Brown, and it was Ward who made the initial approach. McBride later met with Brown, whose star was on the rise after bringing Ohio State its first national championship in 1942, and offered him $17,500 a year (equivalent to $344,832 in 2025) – the biggest salary for any football coach at any level – and an ownership stake in the team. He also offered Brown a stipend for the rest of his time in the military. Brown accepted the position, saying that while he was sad to leave Ohio State, he "couldn't turn down this deal in fairness to my family."

McBride spared no expense in promoting the team and gave Brown full control over personnel. Brown went out and signed future stars including tackle and placekicker Lou Groza, wide receiver Dante Lavelli and quarterback Otto Graham, who got $7,500 a year and a $250 monthly stipend until the end of World War II. McBride then held a contest to name the team in May 1945; "Cleveland Panthers" was the most popular choice, but Brown rejected it because it was the name of an earlier failed football team. "That old Panthers team failed," Brown said. "I want no part of that name." In August, McBride gave in to popular demand and christened the team the Browns, despite Paul Brown's objections.

As the team prepared for its first season in 1946, McBride stepped aside and let Brown run it. The Browns were an immediate success, both financially and on the field. A capacity crowd of 35,964 saw the Browns play their first preseason game at the Akron Rubber Bowl, and the team led all of football in attendance in 1946 and 1947. The Browns, meanwhile, won every AAFC championship between 1946 and 1949. McBride proposed for the Browns to play an inter-league championship game with the National Football League champion Philadelphia Eagles in 1948 and 1949, but the NFL shot down the idea. He also played a role in negotiating peace between the AAFC and NFL after competition for talent drove up player salaries and ate into owners' profits. After the 1949 season, the AAFC dissolved and three of its teams, including the Browns, merged into the more established NFL.

In the Browns' early years, Paul Brown wanted to keep on reserve a number of promising players who did not make the team's official roster. McBride made this happen by putting the reserves on his payroll as taxi drivers, although none of them were asked to drive cabs. This group came to be known as the "taxi squad", a term still in use to describe players kept on hand to fill in for injured team members. The taxi squad was just one of the ways in which McBride backed Brown. He viewed owning the team as primarily a civic duty – as a gift to the city. "Cleveland has been good to me," he said in a 1947 interview. "I've made a great deal of money here. If I was looking for a get-rich-quick investment, the last thing I'd do is buy a pro football club. It's a risky business. Too much depends on ideal weather conditions, and this is no climate to risk a buck on a raindrop."

The Browns continued to succeed upon entering the NFL in 1950, winning the championship that year and reaching the title game in both 1951 and 1952. In January 1951, McBride testified in nationally televised hearings before the Kefauver Committee, where he was questioned about his Continental Press Service and alleged ties to organized crime and illegal gambling. It emerged that McBride partnered with Cleveland police captain John Fleming in real estate deals and had Fleming on the Yellow Cab payroll until 1941. McBride denied the mafia connections, claimed he never broke the law and was never charged with any crime. Congress later passed legislation making such wire services illegal.

During the summer before the 1953 season, McBride sold the Browns for $600,000 (equivalent to $7,220,149 in 2025), more than twice the largest sum ever paid for a professional football team. The old stockholders were McBride and his son Edward, along with minority owners including taxi business associate Dan Sherby, Brown and four others. The buyers were a group of prominent Cleveland men: Dave R. Jones, a businessman and former Cleveland Indians director, Ellis Ryan, a former Cleveland Indians president, Homer Marshman, an attorney who had founded the Cleveland Rams, Saul Silberman, owner of the horse race track later known as Thistledown Racecourse, and Ralph DeChairo, an associate of Silberman. While McBride never said so, the Kefauver hearings and the growing public association between him and the mafia may have played a role in his decision to get out of football. McBride said he had simply "had his fling" with football and wanted to concentrate on other business activities. "Well, I came out clean after all," he said. "Considering what happened to some of the other fellows who started the old All-America Conference with me, this isn't so bad. I never made anything, but I didn't lose anything either, except maybe a few thousand dollars."

McBride's tenure as owner was viewed favorably, partly because of the Browns' on-field success but also because he gave Paul Brown a free hand to coach and sign players. One of the new ownership group's first acts was to assure Cleveland fans that Brown would retain complete control over the football side of the operation.

== Later life and death ==
McBride continued to direct his taxi and real estate businesses after he sold the Browns, but he kept out of the public eye. He died of a heart attack at the Cleveland Clinic and was buried in Cleveland's Holy Cross Cemetery. He was married to the former Mary Jane Kane. They had three children: Arthur B. Jr., Edward and Jane. The McBride family's most visible present assets are a media group in Fort Myers, Florida. McBride bought Fort Myers' first radio station, WINK, in 1946, and signed on Fort Myers' first television station, WINK-TV, in 1954.
