= Mike Scarry =

American football player and coach (1920–2012)

Michael Scarry
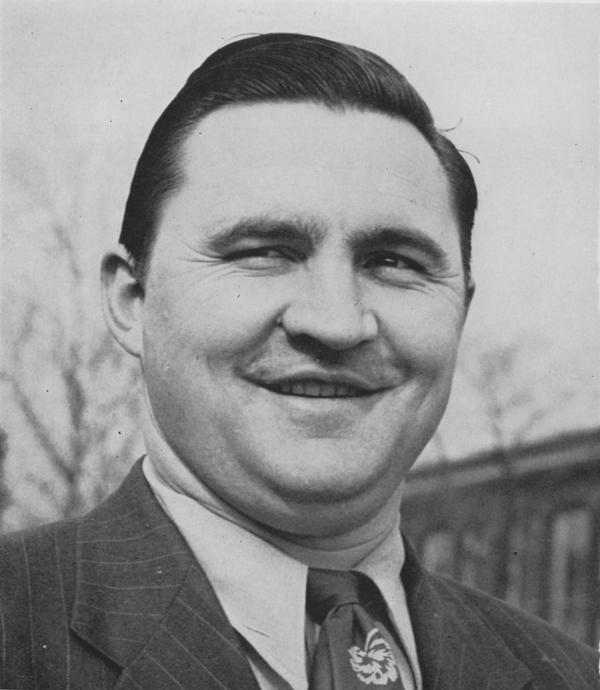

No. 39, 20
- Positions: Center, tackle

Personal information
- Born: February 1, 1920; Duquesne, Pennsylvania, U.S.
- Died: September 9, 2012 (aged 92); Fort Myers, Florida, U.S.
- Listed height: 6 ft 0 in (1.83 m)
- Listed weight: 214 lb (97 kg)

Career information
- High school: Duquesne
- College: Waynesburg; Western Reserve
- NFL draft: 1944: undrafted

Career history

Playing
- Cleveland Rams (1944–1945); Cleveland Browns (1946–1947)

Coaching
- Western Reserve (1948–1949) Head coach; Santa Clara (1950–1951) Assistant; Loras (1952–1953) Head coach; Washington State (1954–1955) Assistant; Cincinnati (1956–1962) Defensive line; Waynesburg (1963–1965) Head coach; Washington Redskins (1966–1968) Defensive line; Miami Dolphins (1970–1985) Defensive line

Awards and highlights
- As a player: NFL champion (1945); 2× AAFC champion (1946, 1947); Member, Pennsylvania Sports Hall of Fame; As a coach: 2× Super Bowl champion (VII, VIII)

Career NFL/AAFC statistics
- Games played: 45
- Games started: 36
- Interceptions: 7
- Stats at Pro Football Reference
- Coaching profile at Pro Football Reference

Michael Joseph "Mo" Scarry (February 1, 1920 – September 9, 2012) was an American football player and coach. He grew up in Pennsylvania, and played football in college at Waynesburg College in Waynesburg, Pennsylvania and went on to join the Cleveland Rams in the National Football League (NFL) as a center following a stint in the United States Army during World War II. The Rams moved to Los Angeles after winning the 1945 NFL championship, and Scarry elected to stay in Cleveland and play for the Cleveland Browns under coach Paul Brown in the new All-America Football Conference (AAFC). The Browns won the AAFC championship in 1946 and 1947 while Scarry was on the team.

Scarry, who coached the basketball team at Western Reserve University in Cleveland during his playing career, retired from professional football after the 1947 season to take up a post as head coach of the school's football team. He stayed there for two seasons before moving to Santa Clara University in California as an assistant coach. Scarry then moved in 1952 to Loras College in Iowa as an assistant. After a stint at Washington State University, he spent six years as the line coach for the University of Cincinnati. Scarry served as head football coach at Waynesburg, his alma mater, for three seasons between 1963 and 1965. The following year he started his first professional coaching job with the NFL's Washington Redskins, and became the defensive line coach of the Miami Dolphins three years later. He stayed with the Dolphins for 15 seasons, during which the team won two Super Bowls, until his retirement. Scarry was inducted into the Pennsylvania Sports Hall of Fame in 2000.

== High school, college and military service ==
Scarry grew up in Duquesne, Pennsylvania, and played on his high school's basketball and football teams. Scarry attended Waynesburg College, a small school in Waynesburg, Pennsylvania, where he continued to play football and basketball. He served in the U.S. Army during World War II in North Africa, but came down with asthma and was given a medical discharge. He signed with the Cleveland Rams of the National Football League starting in 1944.

== Professional career ==
Scarry began the 1944 season with the Rams at left tackle, but was shifted to center in September. He played on both defense and offense. After a season in which the Rams contended for but lost the NFL's western division, Scarry spent the offseason as a student at Western Reserve University in Cleveland and served as the director of a YMCA camp in Mantua, Ohio. Scarry suffered a knee injury near the beginning of the 1945 season, but soon returned to action as the Rams, led by quarterback Bob Waterfield, won the NFL championship. Scarry was the captain of the Rams during the championship run.

The Rams moved to Los Angeles after the 1945 season, and Scarry, along with teammates Chet Adams, Tommy Colella, Don Greenwood and Gaylon Smith, decided to stay in Cleveland and play for the Cleveland Browns, a team under formation in the new All-America Football Conference. The Rams sought an injunction in Federal court to prevent Adams from defecting to the Browns, arguing that he was still under contract with the Rams despite the move. Adams argued that his contract described a team in Cleveland, and was no longer valid because of the Rams' relocation. A judge ruled in favor of Adams in August 1946, clearing the way for him and other former Rams players to join the Browns. Scarry played center his first year with the Browns, protecting Otto Graham.

While Scarry was playing for the Browns, he was named head basketball coach at Western Reserve, where he had taken classes between games and in the offseason. In his first season, Scarry often played between 50 and the full 60 minutes of games, playing on the offensive and defensive lines. Toward the middle of the season, Cleveland coach Paul Brown began to use him as the defensive leader, letting him call the unit's formations. In December, Scarry's Western Reserve basketball team played its first games; he had missed numerous practices because of his duties with the Browns. The Browns went on to win the AAFC championship later in the month.

Scarry remained with the Browns the following season. In September 1947 he received a Bachelor of Science degree from Western Reserve, completing an educational career at Waynesburg that was cut short by the war. By October, he was mentioned as a possible successor to Tom Davies, who had resigned as Western Reserve's football coach. While still one of the AAFC's top centers, Scarry was bothered by injury and asthma and was considering leaving pro football. The Browns, meanwhile, won a second straight AAFC championship in December. Scarry was named Western Reserve's football coach the following January, ending his career with the Browns. Frank Gatski took over as the Browns' regular center after Scarry's retirement.

== Coaching career ==
Scarry borrowed Paul Brown's coaching techniques at Western Reserve, instituting well-organized practices there. "I had a lot of ideas about coaching before I went to work for the Browns," he said in 1947. "But the manner in which Paul organized his practice and all his duties impressed me. I try to do the same here." With no good passer or runner and a lack of depth, Western Reserve's Red Cats performed poorly in Scarry's first season, but he was praised for making the most out of a thin squad. In 1949, his second year, the Red Cats improved to a 4–5–1 (win–loss–draw) record, and Scarry was expected to stay on for a third season. The following year, however, he resigned to take an assistant coaching position at Santa Clara University in California under former Browns assistant Dick Gallagher.

Scarry was at Santa Clara for the 1950 and 1951 seasons, then went to Loras College in Dubuque, Iowa. He stayed at Loras for two years, moving to Washington State College of the Pacific Coast Conference in 1954. He left in November 1955, when head coach Al Kircher was fired in the wake of a 1–10 season. In February 1956, he was hired as a line coach by the University of Cincinnati. During his time at Cincinnati, Scarry served as an assistant to Otto Graham, the former Browns quarterback and teammate of Scarry's, as a coach in the College All-Star Game, a now-defunct annual matchup between the NFL champion and a selection of the best college players from across the country.

After seven seasons at Cincinnati, Scarry got his third head coaching job, for the Yellow Jackets at Waynesburg, his alma mater. He was also the school's athletic director. Scarry held the position for three seasons, from 1963 until 1965, and his teams had a 17–8–1 record during that span. Waynesburg won the Pennsylvania Intercollegiate Athletic Conference title in 1965, and Scarry was voted the conference's coach of the year. Scarry continued to act as the line coach under Graham for the college all-stars in the offseason during his tenure at Waynesburg. In 1964, he was inducted into football hall of fame of the National Association of Intercollegiate Athletics, an association of smaller college sports programs.

Graham became the head coach of the NFL's Washington Redskins in 1966, and he hired Scarry that year as his defensive line coach. Scarry stayed with the Redskins through 1968, when Graham resigned after three unsuccessful seasons and was succeeded by Vince Lombardi. Scarry then scouted briefly for the San Francisco 49ers, Los Angeles Rams, and Dallas Cowboys before taking a job in 1970 as the defensive line coach for the Miami Dolphins under Don Shula, a former Browns player. He spent the remainder of his coaching career with the Dolphins, retiring after 15 years in 1986. Miami reached the Super Bowl five times while Scarry was a coach there, winning consecutive championships in the 1972 and 1973 seasons.

== Later life and death ==
After retiring from football, Scarry worked informally for the Dolphins as a volunteer assistant. He moved with his wife, Libby, to Fort Myers, Florida, in 1994. Scarry was inducted into the Pennsylvania Sports Hall of Fame in 2000. He died in 2012 at his home in Fort Myers; he was the last surviving member of the original Browns team. He had five sons and three daughters. Mike was also the brother of professional basketball player Jack Scarry.

== Head coaching record ==
=== Football ===
Year	Team	Overall	Conference	Standing	Bowl/playoffs
Western Reserve Red Cats (Mid-American Conference) (1948–1949)
1948	Western Reserve	1–8–1	1–4	5th	
1949	Western Reserve	4–5–1	1–3–1	5th	
Western Reserve:		5–13–2	2–7–1		
Loras Duhawks (Independent) (1953)
1953	Loras	5–2–1			
Loras:		5–2–1			
Waynesburg Yellow Jackets (West Penn Conference) (1963–1965)
1963	Waynesburg	6–2	2–0	T–1st	
1964	Waynesburg	5–4	2–1	2nd	
1965	Waynesburg	6–2–1	2–0–1	1st	
Waynesburg:		17–8–1	6–1–1		
Total:		27–23–4			
