= Frank Gatski =

American football player (1921–2005)

- Frank Gatski football card, 1955

No. 72, 22, 33, 52
- Positions: Center, linebacker

Personal information
- Born: March 18, 1921; Farmington, West Virginia, U.S.
- Died: November 22, 2005 (aged 84); Morgantown, West Virginia, U.S.
- Listed height: 6 ft 3 in (1.91 m)
- Listed weight: 233 lb (106 kg)

Career information
- High school: Farmington
- College: Marshall (1940–1941); Auburn (1945)
- NFL draft: 1946: undrafted

Career history
- Cleveland Browns (1946–1956); Detroit Lions (1957)

Awards and highlights
- 4× NFL champion (1950, 1954, 1955, 1957); 4× AAFC champion (1946–1949); 4× First-team All-Pro (1951–1953, 1955); Second-team All-Pro (1954); Pro Bowl (1956); Cleveland Browns Ring of Honor; Marshall Thundering Herd No. 72 retired
- Military career
- Allegiance: United States
- Branch: U.S. Army
- Service years: 1942–1945
- Rank: Private first class
- Conflicts: World War II: European Theatre; Normandy Invasion

Career NFL statistics
- Games played: 144
- Games started: 124
- Interceptions: 3
- Interception yards: 35
- Fumble recoveries: 3
- Defensive touchdowns: 1
- Stats at Pro Football Reference
- Pro Football Hall of Fame

Frank "Gunner" Gatski (March 18, 1921 – November 22, 2005) was an American professional football player who was a center for the Cleveland Browns of the All-America Football Conference (AAFC) and the National Football League (NFL) in the 1940s and 1950s. Gatski was one of the most heralded centers of his era. Known for his strength and consistency, he helped protect quarterback Otto Graham and open up running lanes for fullback Marion Motley as the Browns won seven league championships between 1946 and 1955. Gatski won an eighth championship after he was traded to the Detroit Lions in 1957, his final season.

Gatski was born in West Virginia to a coal-mining family. He played for three years on his local high school team before attending Marshall University, where he continued to play football. He joined the U.S. Army in 1942 and went to fight in World War II. Upon his return in 1945, he played in a couple of games at Auburn University, before officials found out he had attended and played for Marshall, and took classes. After graduating, he tried out and made the roster for the Browns, a team under formation in the new AAFC thanks to Johnny Brickels, the former Huntington High School football coach who knew Paul Brown (Ed Ulinski of Marshall also tried out, played and later coached the Browns) after another former Marshall player, Sam Clagg, alerted Brickels to the two players. Gatski played as a linebacker and backup center for most of his first two years before earning a spot as the starting center. He retained that position as Cleveland continued to dominate the AAFC, going 47–4–2 and winning four championships before the league dissolved and the Browns, the San Francisco 49ers and Baltimore Colts were absorbed by the NFL in 1950. Gatski and the Browns won the 1950, 1954 and 1955 titles, losing in the title game in 1951–52–53. He retired after the 1957 season when he won an eighth title with the Detroit Lions, never having missed a game or practice in his career.

After leaving football, Gatski worked briefly as a scout for the Boston Patriots. He then joined a reform school in West Virginia as athletic director and head football coach, staying there until the school closed in 1982. He was elected to the Pro Football Hall of Fame in 1985. Marshall retired Gatski's number 72 in 2005, the only football number retired for the Thundering Herd. He died that year in a nursing home in West Virginia. In 2006, the East End Bridge in Huntington, West Virginia was renamed the Frank Gatski Memorial Bridge in his honor.

== Early life ==
Gatski was born in 1921 and raised in Farmington, West Virginia. His father and grandfather were immigrants from Poland, and most of the men in his family worked at the nearby Number Nine Coal Mine Camp. Gatski started at center for three years on his Farmington High School football team, which played on a cow pasture with no scoreboard, bleachers or game clock. He worked in the coal mines during the summers, and went to work in the mines full-time during his senior year in 1939. Gatski was reserved and aloof, but he was also known as a graceful dancer. "I used to dance a lot in Farmington," he said in 1949. "But I like polkas better than jitterbugging."

== College and military career ==
In 1940, Marshall University coach Cam Henderson offered Gatski a chance to attend the West Virginia school on a football scholarship. Gatski accepted. He joined the junior varsity team, where he was the starting center for a season before moving to Marshall's varsity football team in 1941. He started 17 games at center and linebacker beginning in 1941, when Marshall posted a 7–1 record. The team faltered the following year, falling to 1–7–1 as its best players went to serve in the military.

Gatski enlisted in the Army Enlisted Reserve Corps before the 1942 season as America's involvement in World War II intensified. Marshall canceled its football program in 1943 as Gatski entered his senior year, and he was called to active duty and later sent with an infantry division to fight in the European theater of World War II. He went to England and followed American troops as they landed in Normandy and marched further into Europe. "I wasn't in any heavy fighting," he later said. He attained the rank of private first class. Gatski returned from duty in 1945, but Marshall had yet to resume its football program, so he enrolled at Auburn University in Alabama and finished out his studies, playing part of the season on the school's football team. "Marshall hadn't started back up, and I hadn't played football for two years," he later explained. "I didn't want to sit around and do nothing, so I went to Auburn."

== Professional career ==
When Gatski graduated, Sam Clagg, a teammate at Marshall, helped get him a tryout with the Cleveland Browns after contacting John Brickels, an assistant coach with West Virginia ties. The Browns were a new team in the All-America Football Conference (AAFC) and were set to begin play in 1946. Gatski, who was working in the mines after graduating from Auburn, hitchhiked to Bowling Green, Ohio for the team's training camp. He did not consider a football career a certainty, and returning to the coal mines where his father had died in an accident was a distinct possibility. "I didn't know what was going to happen," he said later. "I just went up there to see what would happen."

Gatski arrived in Bowling Green with the nickname "Gunner" for his strength and speed on the offensive line that he had acquired in Huntington. The center before Gatski at Marshall, Jim Roberts, was said to hit like a tail gunner, and that may have had something to do with Gatski picking up Gunner as his nickname and as the newest Herd center. Growing up in the rough surroundings of a West Virginia mining town had toughened him up, and he did not mind Cleveland coach Paul Brown's overbearing perfectionism. As a professional, he later said, "you're supposed to be able to take that crap." Initially, Gatski's prospects of making the team looked dim. Brown had brought in veteran center Mo Scarry to be the starter. But Gatski proved his value to the team with his reliability and work ethic. He made the team and signed a $3,000 per year contract.

Gatski played mostly as a backup to Scarry and as a linebacker in his first and part of his second season. He became the full-time starter at center in the 1948 season. The Browns, meanwhile, were an immediate success. The team won the AAFC championship every year from 1946-47-48-49, posting a perfect season of 14–0 in 1948 and losing only four games in four seasons. Gatski's role on the offensive line was to help protect quarterback Otto Graham from defenders when he went back to pass. He also helped push away defenders and create space for fullback Marion Motley to run47- in.

The Browns merged into the more established National Football League (NFL) in 1950. Aided by Gatski's blocking, the offense and the team continued to succeed. Cleveland won the 1950 NFL championship, and reached the championship game in each of the following five seasons, winning again in 1954 and 1955. By the time the Browns entered the NFL, Gatski had developed a reputation for consistency, durability and toughness. Brown began keeping only one center on the roster – Gatski. "Centers today would complain about that," Walt Michaels, who played with Gatski in the early 1950s, said in later years. Gatski, however, did not mind. "He would take all the snaps," Michaels said.

Gatski was a quiet man who liked to hunt. He practiced hitting targets with his bow and arrow at League Park in Cleveland, where the Browns trained during the season. He was one of the Browns "Filthy Five" players who did not wash their practice uniforms during the season. Brown called him one of the strongest men on the team's roster. Graham thought of him as sure protection against opposing linemen. Teammates called him an "iron man" and a "Rock of Gibraltar". He was named to All-Pro lists in all but one year between 1951 and 1955.

The Browns struggled after Graham retired in 1956 and ended the regular season at 5–7, their first-ever losing record. After the season, Brown traded the 35-year-old Gatski to the Detroit Lions for a draft pick after Gatski asked for a raise. He only played in the 1957 season with the Lions. Detroit beat the Browns for the NFL championship that year. By the time he retired after the 1957 season, Gatski had won eight championships and played in 11 championship games in 12 seasons played, a professional football record and still best for any non-kicker/punter. Gatski did not miss a practice or a game during his 12 seasons in football.

== Later life and death ==
After retiring from football, Gatski was a scout for the Boston Patriots for two years before becoming head football coach and athletic director at the West Virginia Industrial School for Boys, a correctional facility for young offenders in Pruntytown, West Virginia.

Gatski was elected to the Pro Football Hall of Fame in 1985 as part of a class that included Joe Namath, Pete Rozelle, O. J. Simpson, and Roger Staubach. Gatski said he had not expected to make it into the hall. He had not played for 28 years when he was selected by an old-timers committee. Two decades later, Marshall University retired Gatski's number 72 during a homecoming game against the University of Alabama at Birmingham. Gatski was the first and remains the only Marshall football player to be so honored.

Gatski died on November 22, 2005, at a nursing home in Morgantown, West Virginia and was buried at the West Virginia National Cemetery in Grafton. He was married and had seven children. The following year, the East End Bridge in Huntington, West Virginia was renamed the Frank Gatski Memorial Bridge during halftime of a Marshall-UTEP football game.
