= Don Greenwood (American football) =

American football player and coach (1921–1983)

- Greenwood c. 1946

No. 66, 85
- Position: Back

Personal information
- Born: February 18, 1921; Detroit, Michigan, U.S.
- Died: March 21, 1983 (aged 62); Princeville, Illinois, U.S.
- Listed height: 6 ft 0 in (1.83 m)
- Listed weight: 190 lb (86 kg)

Career information
- High school: Southwest (Kansas City, Missouri)
- College: Missouri (1940–1941); Illinois (1943–1944)
- NFL draft: 1945: undrafted

Career history

Playing
- Cleveland Rams (1945); Cleveland Browns (1946–1947)

Coaching
- Cuyahoga Falls (1948) Head coach; Yale (1949) Freshmen coach; Toledo (1950) Backfield coach; Toledo (1951) Head coach

Awards and highlights
- NFL champion (1945); 2× AAFC champion (1946, 1947); AAFC rushing touchdowns co-leader (1946)

Career AAFC/NFL statistics
- Rushing yards: 744
- Rushing average: 3.8
- Rushing touchdowns: 10
- Receptions: 12
- Receiving yards: 121
- Stats at Pro Football Reference

Head coaching record
- Career: College: 4–3 (.571)

Donald Adams Greenwood (February 18, 1921 – March 21, 1983) was an American football player and coach. He played professionally as a back for three seasons with the Cleveland Rams and the Cleveland Browns in the National Football League (NFL) and All-America Football Conference (AAFC).

Greenwood played college football for the University of Missouri before transferring to the University of Illinois Urbana-Champaign, where he starred as a halfback, punter and quarterback. His first year in professional football was with the NFL's Rams in 1945, when the team won the NFL championship. The Rams moved to Los Angeles after that year, however, and Greenwood elected to stay in Cleveland, where a new team called the Cleveland Browns was under formation in the AAFC. He played two seasons for the Browns, during both of which the team won the league championship. Greenwood was plagued by injuries in 1946, and in 1947 he suffered a debilitating cheekbone fracture that ended his professional career. After retiring, he worked as a high school coach in Ohio and briefly as an assistant at Yale University. In 1951, became the head football coach at Toledo University, but resigned from that position before completing his first season, saying the school had not done enough to counteract unnecessary violence in the game.

== Early life ==
Greenwood grew up in Kansas City, Missouri and attended Southwest High School. He played on the school's football team but was more accomplished as a track athlete. He won the Missouri state championship in 1938 by running the 100-yard dash in 10 seconds. In 1939, he was a member of an 880-yard relay team that won state and national championships.

== College career ==
After graduating from high school, Greenwood enrolled at the University of Missouri in 1940 and played on the school's football team as a halfback who doubled as a punter. He also continued to run track, and set a school record of 6.2 seconds in the 60-yard dash.

In football, Greenwood became a star on strong Missouri teams in 1941 and 1942. The Missouri Tigers football team ended the 1941 season with an 8–2 record under head coach Don Faurot, winning the Missouri Valley Intercollegiate Athletic Association (Big Six) title and advancing to the Sugar Bowl against Fordham. Missouri lost the game after a punt by Greenwood in the first period was blocked, leading to a safety. The final score of the game, played on a muddy field, was 2–0.

Greenwood entered the United States Army Air Corps in 1942 to serve in World War II, but he got a medical discharge in 1943 after he was injured in a plane crash. After leaving the air corps, Greenwood enrolled at the University of Illinois and played in 1943 and 1944 for the Illinois Fighting Illini football team. He played quarterback at Illinois, and threw five touchdowns in 1943. He played in an October 1944 game against a military team at Great Lakes Naval Training Station coached by Paul Brown that ended in a 26–26 tie.

Greenwood also played baseball in college, mostly as a pitcher starting as a sophomore at Missouri in 1941. In his final year at Illinois he batted .415 against Big Ten Conference teams. He ultimately decided that he had better chances as a football player.

== Professional career ==
Greenwood went undrafted in 1944 but signed late that year with the National Football League's Cleveland Rams. He came to Cleveland before the 1945 season and began an off-season job at Thompson Products Company in its engineering department. His college degree was in psychology, and he hoped to switch to personnel work. He also worked as an assistant to Edward McKeever at Cornell University before the season started. With the Rams, Greenwood was part of a potent offense led by quarterback Bob Waterfield. The team won the 1945 NFL Championship Game by a score of 15–14 in frigid conditions at Cleveland Municipal Stadium.

Owner Dan Reeves moved the Rams to Los Angeles after the 1945 season, and Greenwood decided to stay in Cleveland and play for the Cleveland Browns, a team under formation in the new All-America Football Conference (AAFC) and coached by Paul Brown. He was still under contract with the Rams, but he signed with the Browns after successfully arguing along with several other Rams players that he was not legally bound to play for a team not based in Cleveland. Before the 1946 season started, Greenwood was working in the personnel department of A.W. Hecker Company. He left the company, however, to take a job as the track coach at Western Reserve University in Cleveland.

The Browns won the AAFC championship in 1946, and Greenwood tied as the league's touchdown leader with six. Greenwood, who played halfback both on offense and defense, was plagued by injuries late in 1946 and into 1947. He had a broken cheekbone in 1947 that put him in the hospital for two weeks and kept him on the sidelines as the Browns won another AAFC championship.

== Coaching career ==
Greenwood began his coaching career in 1946 as the track coach of Western Reserve University, now known as Case Western Reserve University, in Cleveland, where he coached for one season.

After the 1947 Browns season, Greenwood announced his retirement from football due to his cheekbone injury and accepted a job as head football coach at Cuyahoga Falls High School in Cuyahoga Falls, Ohio. Greenwood was hired as an assistant coach at Yale University in 1949. By 1951, he was the football coach at Toledo University in Toledo, Ohio. But he left that post the same year in protest of "rough play" during a game between Toledo and Bowling Green. He said football should be discontinued at the school until players could be protected and their safety ensured. He said he would give up coaching until the "accent on win at any cost is abolished". The cheekbone injury he sustained in an "uncalled for collision" in a 1947 game against the San Francisco 49ers helped prompt his decision, he said. He had three operations on the injury, and it had not completely healed.

== Head coaching record ==
=== College ===
Year	Team	Overall	Conference	Standing	Bowl/playoffs
Toledo Rockets (Independent) (1951)
1951	Toledo	4–3 (Note: Greenwood served as head coach for the first seven games of the season before he resigned. Claire Dunn replaced Greenwood as head coach for the final three games of the season. The Rockets finished the year with an overall record of 6–4.)			
Toledo:		4–3			
Total:		4–3			
