= 1949 AAFC draft =

1949 American football draft

General information
- Date: December 21, 1948

Overview
- 192 total selections in 29 rounds
- League: AAFC
- First selection: Stan Heath, QB; University of Nevada, Reno

The 1949 AAFC draft was the third and last collegiate draft of the All-America Football Conference (AAFC). The teams traded draft choices for the first time in league history. New York sent their first round pick to Chicago, which selected Pete Elliott. Brooklyn traded their second round pick to New York, which selected Lou Kusserow. Chicago traded their third round pick to Buffalo, which selected Hugh Keeney.

== Secret draft ==
The AAFC held an initial secret draft on July 8, 1948. It consisted of two rounds and was held before the start of the college football season, in order to give the league an advantage on signing players over the National Football League. Two of the selections (Ernie Stautner and Levi Jackson) were voided by league Commissioner Oliver Kessing, because the players were juniors and had college eligibility remaining for the 1949 season.

| = All-Star |
| = AAFC MVP |

| Round | Pick # | AAFC team | Player | Position | College |
|---|---|---|---|---|---|
| 1 | 1 | Chicago Hornets | Terry Brennan | B | Notre Dame |
| 1 | 2 | Baltimore Colts | Dick Harris | C | Texas |
| 1 | 3 | Brooklyn Dodgers | Chuck Bednarik | C | Pennsylvania |
| 1 | 4 | Los Angeles Dons | Dan Dworsky | C | Michigan |
| 1 | 5 | San Francisco 49ers | Ernie Stautner | T | Boston College |
| 1 | 6 | Buffalo Bills | Abe Gibron | G | Purdue |
| 1 | 7 | Chicago Hornets | Pete Elliott | B | Michigan |
| 1 | 8 | Cleveland Browns | Gene Derricotte | B | Michigan |
| 2 | 9 | Chicago Hornets | Bill Fischer | G | Notre Dame |
| 2 | 10 | Baltimore Colts | Levi Jackson | B | Yale |
| 2 | 11 | New York Yankees | Lou Kusserow | B | Columbia |
| 2 | 12 | Los Angeles Dons | Jack Price | B | Baylor |
| 2 | 13 | San Francisco 49ers | Jim Winkler | T | Texas A&M |
| 2 | 14 | Buffalo Bills | Frank Tripucka | QB | Notre Dame |
| 2 | 15 | New York Yankees | John Rauch | QB | Georgia |
| 2 | 16 | Cleveland Browns | Dick Kempthorn | B | Michigan |

== Player selections ==
| = All-Star |
| = AAFC MVP |

| Round | Pick # | AAFC team | Player | Position | College |
|---|---|---|---|---|---|
| 1 | 1 | Chicago Hornets | Stan Heath | QB | Nevada-Reno |
| 1 | 2 | Brooklyn Dodgers | Joe Sullivan | B | Dartmouth |
| 1 | 3 | New York Yankees | Bobby Thomason | QB | Virginia Military Institute |
| 1 | 4 | Baltimore Colts | George Sims | B | Baylor |
| 1 | 5 | Los Angeles Dons | George Taliaferro | B | Indiana |
| 1 | 6 | Buffalo Bills | Bill Kay | T | Iowa |
| 1 | 7 | San Francisco 49ers | Chet Fritz | T | Missouri |
| 1 | 8 | Cleveland Browns | Jack Mitchell | QB | Oklahoma |
| 2 | 9 | Chicago Hornets | George Blanda | QB | Kentucky |
| 2 | 10 | Brooklyn Dodgers | Len Szafaryn | T | North Carolina |
| 2 | 11 | Brooklyn Dodgers | Bill Walsh | C | Notre Dame |
| 2 | 12 | Brooklyn Dodgers | Lou Ferry | T | Villanova |
| 2 | 13 | New York Yankees | John Panelli | B | Notre Dame |
| 2 | 14 | Baltimore Colts | Bobby Gage | B | Clemson |
| 3 | 15 | Buffalo Bills | Huey Keeney | B | Rice |
| 3 | 16 | Brooklyn Dodgers | Wally Triplett | B | Penn State |
| 3 | 17 | New York Yankees | Sherman Howard | B | Nevada-Reno |
| 3 | 18 | Los Angeles Dons | Hosea Rodgers | B | North Carolina |
| 3 | 19 | Buffalo Bills | Veto Kissell | B | Holy Cross |
| 3 | 20 | San Francisco 49ers | Frank LoVuolo | E | St. Bonaventure |
| 3 | 21 | Cleveland Browns | Albin Collins | B | Louisiana State |
| 4 | 22 | Chicago Hornets | Jim Finks | QB | Tulsa |
| 4 | 23 | Brooklyn Dodgers | Dolph Tokarczyk | G | Pennsylvania |
| 4 | 24 | New York Yankees | Dick Rifenburg | E | Michigan |
| 4 | 25 | Baltimore Colts | Ralph Kohl | T | Michigan |
| 4 | 26 | Los Angeles Dons | Bob Meinert | B | Oklahoma State |
| 4 | 27 | Buffalo Bills | Wilbur Volz | B | Missouri |
| 4 | 28 | San Francisco 49ers | Mike DeNoia | B | Scranton |
| 4 | 29 | Cleveland Browns | Bill McLellan | T | Brown |
| 5 | 30 | Chicago Hornets | Carmen Falcone | B | Pennsylvania |
| 5 | 31 | Brooklyn Dodgers | Joe Quinn | G | Cornell |
| 5 | 32 | New York Yankees | George Maddock | T | Northwestern |
| 5 | 33 | Baltimore Colts | Wally Jones | E | Eastern Kentucky |
| 5 | 34 | Los Angeles Dons | Billy Joe Grimes | B | Oklahoma State |
| 5 | 35 | Buffalo Bills | Frank Gaul | G | Notre Dame |
| 5 | 36 | San Francisco 49ers | George Brodnax | E | Georgia Tech |
| 5 | 37 | Cleveland Browns | Ed McNeill | E | Michigan |
| 6 | 38 | Chicago Hornets | Sam Tamburo | B | Penn State |
| 6 | 39 | Brooklyn Dodgers | Leo Skladany | E | Pittsburgh |
| 6 | 40 | New York Yankees | Don Panciera | QB | San Francisco |
| 6 | 41 | Baltimore Colts | Frank Pattee | B | Kansas |
| 6 | 42 | Los Angeles Dons | Joe Geri | B | Georgia |
| 6 | 43 | Buffalo Bills | Frank Guess | B | Texas |
| 6 | 44 | San Francisco 49ers | John Hamberger | T | Southern Methodist |
| 6 | 45 | Cleveland Browns | Tom O'Malley | B | Cincinnati |
| 7 | 46 | Chicago Hornets | Ralph Hutchinson | T | Tennessee-Chattanooga |
| 7 | 47 | Brooklyn Dodgers | Lynn Chewning | B | Hampden-Sydney |
| 7 | 48 | New York Yankees | Dan Garza | E | Oregon |
| 7 | 49 | Baltimore Colts | Fred Folger | B | Duke |
| 7 | 50 | Los Angeles Dons | Bill Renna | C | Santa Clara |
| 7 | 51 | Buffalo Bills | Hal Entsminger | QB | Missouri |
| 7 | 52 | San Francisco 49ers | Dan Stiegman | C | North Carolina |
| 7 | 53 | Cleveland Browns | Phil Alexander | T | South Carolina |
| 8 | 54 | Chicago Hornets | Jim Cain | E | Alabama |
| 8 | 55 | Brooklyn Dodgers | Bob McCurry | C | Michigan State |
| 8 | 56 | New York Yankees | Brian Bell | B | Washington & Lee |
| 8 | 57 | Baltimore Colts | Bob Prymuski | T | Illinois |
| 8 | 58 | Los Angeles Dons | Bill Austin | T | Oregon State |
| 8 | 59 | Buffalo Bills | Vic Vasicek | G | Texas |
| 8 | 60 | San Francisco 49ers | Bernie Reid | G | Georgia |
| 8 | 61 | Cleveland Browns | Mike Cannavino | B | Ohio State |
| 9 | 62 | Chicago Hornets | Tino Sabuco | C | San Francisco |
| 9 | 63 | Brooklyn Dodgers | Chuck Klemovich | G | Columbia |
| 9 | 64 | New York Yankees | Al Mastrangeli | C | Illinois |
| 9 | 65 | Baltimore Colts | Ev Faunce | B | Minnesota |
| 9 | 66 | Los Angeles Dons | Mike Rubish | E | North Carolina |
| 9 | 67 | Buffalo Bills | Alex Verdova | B | Ohio State |
| 9 | 68 | San Francisco 49ers | Fred Wendt | B | Texas-El Paso |
| 9 | 69 | Cleveland Browns | Doak Walker | B | Southern Methodist |
| 10 | 70 | Chicago Hornets | Warren Huey | E | Michigan State |
| 10 | 71 | Brooklyn Dodgers | Bob Duncan | E | Duke |
| 10 | 72 | New York Yankees | John Goldsberry | T | Indiana |
| 10 | 73 | Baltimore Colts | Kale Alexander | T | South Carolina |
| 10 | 74 | Los Angeles Dons | Jerry Krall | B | Ohio State |
| 10 | 75 | Buffalo Bills | Al Russas | E | Tennessee |
| 10 | 76 | San Francisco 49ers | Dick Flowers | T | Alabama |
| 10 | 77 | Cleveland Browns | Norby Adams | B | Purdue |
| 11 | 78 | Chicago Hornets | Norm Van Brocklin | QB | Oregon |
| 11 | 79 | Brooklyn Dodgers | Hillary Chollet | B | Cornell |
| 11 | 80 | New York Yankees | Ben Bendrick | B | Wisconsin |
| 11 | 81 | Baltimore Colts | Paul Page | B | Southern Methodist |
| 11 | 82 | Los Angeles Dons | Chuck Drazenovich | B | Penn State |
| 11 | 83 | Buffalo Bills | Ernie Settembre | T | Miami (Florida) |
| 11 | 84 | San Francisco 49ers | Bobby Lund | B | Tennessee |
| 11 | 85 | Cleveland Browns | Neg Norton | T | Penn State |
| 12 | 86 | Chicago Hornets | Jay Van Noy | B | Utah State |
| 12 | 87 | Brooklyn Dodgers | Bill Davis | G | Duke |
| 12 | 88 | New York Yankees | Frank Van Deren | E | California |
| 12 | 89 | Baltimore Colts | Jim Owens | E | Oklahoma |
| 12 | 90 | Los Angeles Dons | Larry Klosterman | G | North Carolina |
| 12 | 91 | Buffalo Bills | Milt Kormarnicki | C | Villanova |
| 12 | 92 | San Francisco 49ers | Jon Baker | G | California |
| 12 | 93 | Cleveland Browns | Frank Burns | B | Rutgers |
| 13 | 94 | Chicago Hornets | Tom Wham | E | Furman |
| 13 | 95 | Brooklyn Dodgers | Roland Dale | T | Mississippi |
| 13 | 96 | New York Yankees | Ed Berrang | E | Villanova |
| 13 | 97 | Baltimore Colts | Warren Beson | C | Minnesota |
| 13 | 98 | Los Angeles Dons | Tom Blake | G | Cincinnati |
| 13 | 99 | Buffalo Bills | Butch Songin | QB | Boston College |
| 13 | 100 | San Francisco 49ers | Jim Reichert | G | Arkansas |
| 13 | 101 | Cleveland Browns | Clarence Self | B | Wisconsin |
| 14 | 102 | Chicago Hornets | Ivan Snowden | T | Texas A&M-Kingsville |
| 14 | 103 | Brooklyn Dodgers | Murry Alexander | E | Mississippi State |
| 14 | 104 | New York Yankees | Bob Doornink | T | Washington State |
| 14 | 105 | Baltimore Colts | Dave Moon | B | Southern Methodist |
| 14 | 106 | Los Angeles Dons | Dick Lorenz | E | Oregon State |
| 14 | 107 | Buffalo Bills | Leon Cooper | T | Hardin-Simmons |
| 14 | 108 | San Francisco 49ers | Don Garlin | B | USC |
| 14 | 109 | Cleveland Browns | Walt Kersulis | E | Illinois |
| 15 | 110 | Chicago Hornets | Charlie Reynolds | B | Texas Tech |
| 15 | 111 | Brooklyn Dodgers | Howard Derrick | B | Tennessee-Chattanooga |
| 15 | 112 | New York Yankees | Jack Glenn | T | Georgia Tech |
| 15 | 113 | Baltimore Colts | Jon Jenkins | T | Dartmouth |
| 15 | 114 | Los Angeles Dons | Bob Bastian | G | USC |
| 15 | 115 | Buffalo Bills | Clay Tonnemaker | C | Minnesota |
| 15 | 116 | San Francisco 49ers | Pete Wismann | C | St. Louis |
| 15 | 117 | Cleveland Browns | Bobby Jack Stuart | B | Army |
| 16 | 118 | Chicago Hornets | Dick Monroe | C | Kansas |
| 16 | 119 | Brooklyn Dodgers | Dale Armstrong | E | Dartmouth |
| 16 | 120 | New York Yankees | Jack Bruce | B | William & Mary |
| 16 | 121 | Baltimore Colts | Red O'Quinn | E | Wake Forest |
| 16 | 122 | Los Angeles Dons | Art Steffen | B | UCLA |
| 16 | 123 | Buffalo Bills | Rob Goode | B | Texas A&M |
| 16 | 124 | San Francisco 49ers | Homer Hobbs | G | Georgia |
| 16 | 125 | Cleveland Browns | Dinky Bowen | B | Georgia Tech |
| 17 | 126 | Chicago Hornets | George Guerre | B | Michigan State |
| 17 | 127 | Brooklyn Dodgers | Tank Younger | B | Grambling State |
| 17 | 128 | New York Yankees | Gil Johnson | B | Southern Methodist |
| 17 | 129 | Baltimore Colts | Clyde Geary | T | Connecticut Wesleyan |
| 17 | 130 | Los Angeles Dons | Tom Gannon | B | Harvard |
| 17 | 131 | Buffalo Bills | Art Donovan | G | Boston College |
| 18 | 132 | Chicago Hornets | John Phillips | B | Southern Mississippi |
| 18 | 133 | Brooklyn Dodgers | Mitch Holmgren | T | Trinity (Connecticut) |
| 18 | 134 | New York Yankees | Barney Hafen | E | Utah |
| 18 | 135 | Baltimore Colts | Al Sanders | T | Southern Mississippi |
| 18 | 136 | Los Angeles Dons | Larry Hatch | B | Washington |
| 18 | 137 | Buffalo Bills | Jim Goodman | T | Maryland |
| 19 | 138 | Chicago Hornets | Vitamin Smith | B | Abilene Christian |
| 19 | 139 | Brooklyn Dodgers | Frank Weaver | B | Moravian |
| 19 | 140 | New York Yankees | Hal Jensen | B | San Francisco |
| 19 | 141 | Baltimore Colts | Guy Sundheim | C | Northwestern |
| 19 | 142 | Los Angeles Dons | Jerry Tiblier | B | Mississippi |
| 19 | 143 | Buffalo Bills | Merlin London | E | Oklahoma State |
| 20 | 144 | Chicago Hornets | Clay Davis | C | Oklahoma State |
| 20 | 145 | Brooklyn Dodgers | Eddie Price | B | Tulane |
| 20 | 146 | New York Yankees | Tommy Kalmanir | B | Nevada-Reno |
| 20 | 147 | Baltimore Colts | Murney Lazier | B | Illinois |
| 20 | 148 | Los Angeles Dons | Gene Frassetto | T | California |
| 20 | 149 | Buffalo Bills | Marty Breen | C | Canisius |
| 21 | 150 | Chicago Hornets | George Benigni | E | Georgetown (DC) |
| 21 | 151 | Brooklyn Dodgers | John Geosits | T | Bucknell |
| 21 | 152 | New York Yankees | Al Beasley | G | St. Mary's (California) |
| 21 | 153 | Baltimore Colts | Harry Larche | T | Arkansas State |
| 21 | 154 | Los Angeles Dons | Jim Clark | G | Mississippi |
| 21 | 155 | Buffalo Bills | John Simon | G | Penn State |
| 22 | 156 | Chicago Hornets | R.M. Patterson | T | McMurry |
| 22 | 157 | Brooklyn Dodgers | Tom Brennan | G | Boston College |
| 22 | 158 | New York Yankees | Ernie Tolman | E | USC |
| 23 | 159 | Chicago Hornets | Bill Kemplin | E | North Texas |
| 23 | 160 | Brooklyn Dodgers | Jack McBride | E | Rice |
| 23 | 161 | New York Yankees | Jerry Morrical | T | Indiana |
| 24 | 162 | Chicago Hornets | Billy Cadenhead | B | Alabama |
| 24 | 163 | Brooklyn Dodgers | Bobby Folsom | E | Southern Methodist |
| 24 | 164 | New York Yankees | Bob Hood | E | Alabama |
| 25 | 165 | Chicago Hornets | Phil Poole | G | Mississippi |
| 25 | 166 | Brooklyn Dodgers | Bill Long | E | Oklahoma State |
| 25 | 167 | New York Yankees | Ross Nagel | T | St. Louis |
| 25 | 168 | Baltimore Colts | Walt Grothaus | G | Notre Dame |
| 25 | 169 | Los Angeles Dons | Ed Ralston | B | Richmond |
| 25 | 170 | Buffalo Bills | Bernie Hanula | T | Wake Forest |
| 25 | 171 | San Francisco 49ers | Paul Shoults | B | Miami (Ohio) |
| 25 | 172 | Cleveland Browns | Larry Cooney | B | Penn State |
| 26 | 173 | Baltimore Colts | Byron Gillory | B | Texas |
| 26 | 174 | Los Angeles Dons | Johnny Donaldson | B | Georgia |
| 26 | 175 | Buffalo Bills | Bobby Deuber | B | Pennsylvania |
| 26 | 176 | San Francisco 49ers | Jack Kelly | T | Louisiana Tech |
| 26 | 177 | Cleveland Browns | Ray Lininger | C | Ohio State |
| 27 | 178 | Baltimore Colts | Bob Cox | E | North Carolina |
| 27 | 179 | Los Angeles Dons | Lloyd Eisenberg | T | Duke |
| 27 | 180 | Buffalo Bills | Floyd Lewis | G | Southern Methodist |
| 27 | 181 | San Francisco 49ers | Jasper Flanakin | E | Baylor |
| 27 | 182 | Cleveland Browns | Vern Gagne | E | Minnesota |
| 28 | 183 | Baltimore Colts | Bob DeMoss | B | Purdue |
| 28 | 184 | Los Angeles Dons | George Pastre | T | UCLA |
| 28 | 185 | Buffalo Bills | Leon Cochran | B | Auburn |
| 28 | 186 | San Francisco 49ers | Rudy Smith | T | Louisiana Tech |
| 28 | 187 | Cleveland Browns | Jim Moran | B | John Carroll |
| 29 | 188 | Baltimore Colts | George Pryor | B | Wake Forest |
| 29 | 189 | Los Angeles Dons | Joe Ethridge | G | Southern Methodist |
| 29 | 190 | Buffalo Bills | Joe Leonard | T | Virginia |
| 29 | 191 | San Francisco 49ers | Gordon Long | B | Arkansas |
| 29 | 192 | Cleveland Browns | Joe Soboleski | T | Michigan |
