= 1947 William & Mary Indians football team =

American college football season

1947 William & Mary Indians football

SoCon champion

Dixie Bowl, L 19–21 vs. Arkansas
- Conference: Southern Conference

Ranking
- AP: No. 14
- Record: 9–2 (7–1 SoCon)
- Head coach: Rube McCray (4th season)
- Captain: Bob Steckroth
- Home stadium: Cary Field

1947 Southern Conference football standings
	Conf.					Overall
Team	W		L		T	W		L		T
No. 14 William & Mary $	7	–	1	–	0	9	–	2	–	0
No. 9 North Carolina	4	–	1	–	0	8	–	2	–	0
South Carolina	4	–	1	–	1	6	–	2	–	1
No. 19 Duke	3	–	1	–	1	4	–	3	–	2
Washington and Lee	3	–	2	–	0	5	–	5	–	0
Maryland	3	–	2	–	1	7	–	2	–	2
No. 17 NC State	3	–	2	–	1	5	–	3	–	1
VPI	4	–	3	–	0	4	–	5	–	0
Davidson	3	–	3	–	1	6	–	3	–	1
Wake Forest	3	–	4	–	0	6	–	4	–	0
VMI	2	–	3	–	1	3	–	5	–	1
Clemson	1	–	3	–	0	4	–	5	–	0
The Citadel	1	–	4	–	0	3	–	5	–	0
Furman	1	–	4	–	0	2	–	7	–	0
Richmond	1	–	5	–	0	3	–	7	–	0
George Washington	0	–	4	–	0	1	–	7	–	1
$ – Conference champion; Rankings from AP Poll

The 1947 William & Mary Indians football team was an American football team that represented the College of William & Mary in the Southern Conference during the 1947 college football season. In its fourth season under head coach Rube McCray, the team compiled a 9–2 record (7–1 against conference opponents), won the Southern Conference championship, was ranked No. 14 in the final AP Poll, and outscored opponents by a total of 320 to 87. The team lost to North Carolina in the regular season and to Arkansas in the 1948 Dixie Bowl on New Year's Day.

Five William & Mary players were selected by the Associated Press as first-team players on the 1947 All-Southern Conference football team: fullback Jack Cloud; end Robert Steckroth; guard Knox Ramsey; and center Tommy Thompson. Cloud broke the school's scoring record with 102 points in 1947 and was later inducted into the College Football Hall of Fame. In addition, tackle Lou Creekmur later played ten years with the Detroit Lions and was inducted into the Pro Football Hall of Fame.

The team played it home games at Cary Field in Williamsburg, Virginia.

== Schedule ==
Date	Opponent	Rank	Site	Result	Attendance	Source
September 27	vs. Davidson		Foreman Field; Norfolk, VA	W 21–0	9,000	
October 4	The Citadel		Cary Field; Williamsburg, VA	W 56–7	6,000	
October 11	vs. VPI		City Stadium; Richmond, VA	W 21–7	10,000	
October 18	North Carolina		Cary Field; Williamsburg, VA	L 7–13	18,000	
October 25	at Boston University*		Fenway Park; Boston, MA	W 47–13	6,800	
November 1	Wake Forest		Cary Field; Williamsburg, VA	W 21–0	17,000	
November 8	VMI^{†}	No. 15	Cary Field; Williamsburg, VA (rivalry)	W 28–20	8,000	
November 15	vs. Washington and Lee	No. 12	Victory Stadium; Roanoke, VA	W 45–6		
November 22	Bowling Green*	No. 14	Cary Field; Williamsburg, VA	W 20–0	2,000	
November 27	at Richmond	No. 14	City Stadium; Richmond, VA (rivalry)	W 35–0	15,000	
January 1, 1948	vs. Arkansas*	No. 14	Legion Field; Birmingham, AL (Dixie Bowl)	L 19–21	25,000	
*Non-conference game; ^{†}Homecoming; Rankings from AP Poll released prior to the game

== Rankings ==
Ranking movements Legend: ██ Increase in ranking ██ Decrease in ranking — = Not ranked т = Tied with team above or below ( ) = First-place votes
	Week									
Poll	1	2	3	4	5	6	7	8	9	Final
AP	—	—	—	—	15	12	14	14	13т (3)	14

== NFL draft selections ==
= Pro Football Hall of Fame	= Canadian Football Hall of Fame	= College Football Hall of Fame

NFL Draft Selections

#	Year	Round	Pick	Overall	Name	Team	Position
16	1948	3	3	16	Tommy Thompson	Washington Redskins	Center
17	1948	5	7	32	Knox Ramsey	Chicago Bears	Guard
18	1948	10	1	76	Stan Magdziak	New York Giants	Back
19	1948	11	7	92	Jim McDowell	Chicago Bears	Guard
20	1948	18	10	165	Harry Caughron	Chicago Cardinals	Tackle
21	1948	23	3	208	Lou Hoitsma	Washington Redskins	End
22	1948	26	8	243	Lou Creekmur	Philadelphia Eagles	Tackle
