= 1946 All-Southern Conference football team =

The 1946 All-Southern Conference football team consists of American football players chosen by coaches and sports writers on behalf of the Associated Press (AP) and United Press (UP) as the best at each position from the Southern Conference during the 1946 college football season.

Two triple-threat backs, Howard "Touchdown" Turner of NC State and Nick Sacrinty of Wake Forest, were rated as the most consistent players in the conference.

Duke led the conference with three players chosen on the first team: end Kelly Mote; tackle Al DeRogatis; and guard Bill Milner. William & Mary followed with two players on the first team: back Jack Cloud and guard Knox Ramsey. DeRogatis, Cloud, and NC State halfback Charlie Justice were late inducted into the College Football Hall of Fame.

== All-Southern Conference selections ==
=== Backs ===
- Charlie Justice, North Carolina (AP-1, UP-1)
- Howie Turner, NC State (AP-1, UP-1)
- Nick Sacrinty, Wake Forest (AP-1, UP-1)
- Jack Cloud, William & Mary (AP-1, UP-1)
- Bobby Thomason, VMI (AP-2, UP-2)
- George Clark, Duke (AP-2, UP-2)
- Leo Long, Duke (AP-2, UP-3)
- Tommy Korczowski, William & Mary (AP-3, UP-2)
- Bo Hagan, South Carolina (AP-3, UP-2)
- Richard Brinkley, Wake Forest (AP-2)
- Nick Ognovich, Wake Forest (AP-3)
- Hosea Rodgers, North Carolina (AP-3)
- Earl Dunham, South Carolina (UP-3)
- Buddy Milligan, Duke (UP-3)
- Walt Pupa, North Carolina (UP-3)

=== Ends ===
- Kelly Mote, Duke (AP-1, UP-1)
- Bill Chipley, Washington & Lee (AP-1, UP-2)
- Paul Gibson, NC State (AP-2, UP-1)
- Robert Steckroth, William & Mary (AP-2, UP-3)
- Art Weiner, North Carolina (UP-2)
- Red O'Quinn, Wake Forest (AP-3, UP-3)
- U.S. Savage, Richmond (AP-3)

=== Tackles ===
- Al Derogatis, Duke (AP-1, UP-1)
- John Maskas, VPI (AP-1, UP-1)
- Ralph Sazio, William & Mary (AP-2)
- Ted Hazelwood, North Carolina (AP-2, UP-3)
- Dom Fusci, South Carolina (AP-3, UP-2)
- Taylor Moser, NC State (UP-2)
- Malachi Mills, VMI (AP-3)
- Lou Allen, Duke (UP-3)

=== Guards ===
- Knox Ramsey, William & Mary (AP-1, UP-1)
- Bill Milner, Duke (AP-1, UP-1)
- Bernard Watts, NC State (AP-2)
- Ernest Knotts, Duke (AP-2, UP-3)
- Ralph Strayhorn, North Carolina (UP-2)
- Sid Varney, North Carolina (AP-3)
- Bob Leonetti, Wake Forest (AP-3, UP-2)
- Frank Gillespie, Clemson (UP-3)

=== Centers ===
- Bryant Meeks, South Carolina (AP-1, UP-1)
- Chan Highsmith, North Carolina (AP-2, UP-2)
- Tommy Thompson, William & Mary (AP-3)
- Ralph Jenkins, Clemson (UP-3)

== Key ==
AP = Associated Press UP = United Press

== See also ==
- 1946 College Football All-America Team
