= 1947 North Carolina Tar Heels football team =

American college football season

1947 North Carolina Tar Heels football
- Conference: Southern Conference

Ranking
- AP: No. 9
- Record: 8–2 (4–1 SoCon)
- Head coach: Carl Snavely (5th season)
- Captains: George Sparger; Joe Wright
- Home stadium: Kenan Memorial Stadium

1947 Southern Conference football standings
	Conf.					Overall
Team	W		L		T	W		L		T
No. 14 William & Mary $	7	–	1	–	0	9	–	2	–	0
No. 9 North Carolina	4	–	1	–	0	8	–	2	–	0
South Carolina	4	–	1	–	1	6	–	2	–	1
No. 19 Duke	3	–	1	–	1	4	–	3	–	2
Washington and Lee	3	–	2	–	0	5	–	5	–	0
Maryland	3	–	2	–	1	7	–	2	–	2
No. 17 NC State	3	–	2	–	1	5	–	3	–	1
VPI	4	–	3	–	0	4	–	5	–	0
Davidson	3	–	3	–	1	6	–	3	–	1
Wake Forest	3	–	4	–	0	6	–	4	–	0
VMI	2	–	3	–	1	3	–	5	–	1
Clemson	1	–	3	–	0	4	–	5	–	0
The Citadel	1	–	4	–	0	3	–	5	–	0
Furman	1	–	4	–	0	2	–	7	–	0
Richmond	1	–	5	–	0	3	–	7	–	0
George Washington	0	–	4	–	0	1	–	7	–	1
$ – Conference champion; Rankings from AP Poll

The 1947 North Carolina Tar Heels football team was an American football team that represented the University of North Carolina at Chapel Hill in the Southern Conference during the 1947 college football season. In its fifth year under head coach Carl Snavely, the team compiled an 8–2 record (4–1 against conference opponents), finished in second place in the conference, was ranked No. 9 in the final AP Poll, and outscored opponents by a total of 210 to 93.

Three North Carolina players were selected by the Associated Press as first-team players on the 1947 All-Southern Conference football team: halfback Charlie Justice; end Art Weiner; and tackle Len Szafaryn. Justice, known as Charlie "Choo Choo" Justice, was a triple-threat man who was selected by a vote of the Southern Conference's 16 head coaches as the most valuable player in the conference during the 1947 season.

The team played its home games at Kenan Memorial Stadium in Chapel Hill, North Carolina.

== Schedule ==
Date	Time	Opponent	Rank	Site	Result	Attendance	Source
September 27	2:30 p.m.	Georgia*		Kenan Memorial Stadium; Chapel Hill, NC	W 14–7	44,000	
October 4	3:30 p.m.	at Texas*		Texas Memorial Stadium; Austin, TX	L 0–34	47,000	
October 11	2:30 p.m.	Wake Forest	No. 19	Kenan Memorial Stadium; Chapel Hill, NC (rivalry)	L 7–19	35,000	
October 18	2:30 p.m.	at William & Mary		Cary Field; Williamsburg, VA	W 13–7	18,000	
October 25	2:30 p.m.	at Florida*		Florida Field; Gainesville, FL	W 35–7	25,000	
November 1	2:00 p.m.	Tennessee*		Kenan Memorial Stadium; Chapel Hill, NC	W 20–6	41,000	
November 8	2:00 p.m.	NC State	No. 18	Kenan Memorial Stadium; Chapel Hill, NC (rivalry)	W 41–6	40,000	
November 15	2:00 p.m.	vs. Maryland	No. 19	Griffith Stadium; Washington, DC	W 19–0	22,000	
November 22	2:00 p.m.	at Duke	No. 13	Duke Stadium; Durham, NC (rivalry)	W 21–0	56,000	
November 29	2:00 p.m.	Virginia*	No. 10	Kenan Memorial Stadium; Chapel Hill, NC (South's Oldest Rivalry)	W 40–7	40,000	
*Non-conference game; Rankings from AP Poll released prior to the game; All times are in Eastern time

== Rankings ==
Ranking movements Legend: ██ Increase in ranking ██ Decrease in ranking — = Not ranked ( ) = First-place votes
	Week									
Poll	1	2	3	4	5	6	7	8	9	Final
AP	19	—	—	—	18	19	13 (1)	10 (3)	10 (9)	9 (7)
