= 1947 Wake Forest Demon Deacons football team =

American college football season

1947 Wake Forest Demon Deacons football
- Conference: Southern Conference
- Record: 6–4 (3–4 SoCon)
- Head coach: Peahead Walker (11th season)
- Captains: Harry Clark; Ed Royston
- Home stadium: Groves Stadium

1947 Southern Conference football standings
	Conf.					Overall
Team	W		L		T	W		L		T
No. 14 William & Mary $	7	–	1	–	0	9	–	2	–	0
No. 9 North Carolina	4	–	1	–	0	8	–	2	–	0
South Carolina	4	–	1	–	1	6	–	2	–	1
No. 19 Duke	3	–	1	–	1	4	–	3	–	2
Washington and Lee	3	–	2	–	0	5	–	5	–	0
Maryland	3	–	2	–	1	7	–	2	–	2
No. 17 NC State	3	–	2	–	1	5	–	3	–	1
VPI	4	–	3	–	0	4	–	5	–	0
Davidson	3	–	3	–	1	6	–	3	–	1
Wake Forest	3	–	4	–	0	6	–	4	–	0
VMI	2	–	3	–	1	3	–	5	–	1
Clemson	1	–	3	–	0	4	–	5	–	0
The Citadel	1	–	4	–	0	3	–	5	–	0
Furman	1	–	4	–	0	2	–	7	–	0
Richmond	1	–	5	–	0	3	–	7	–	0
George Washington	0	–	4	–	0	1	–	7	–	1
$ – Conference champion; Rankings from AP Poll

The 1947 Wake Forest Demon Deacons football team was an American football team that represented Wake Forest University during the 1947 college football season. In its 11th season under head coach Peahead Walker, the team compiled a 6–4 record and finished in tenth place in the Southern Conference.

Guard Edward Royston was selected by the Associated Press as a first-team player on the 1947 All-Southern Conference football team.

Wake Forest was ranked at No. 57 (out of 500 college football teams) in the final Litkenhous Ratings for 1947.

== Schedule ==
Date	Opponent	Rank	Site	Result	Attendance	Source
September 27	Georgetown*		Groves Stadium; Wake Forest, NC	W 6–0	12,000	
October 4	at Clemson		Memorial Stadium; Clemson, SC	W 16–14	14,000	
October 11	at No. 19 North Carolina		Kenan Memorial Stadium; Chapel Hill, NC (rivalry)	W 19–7	35,000	
October 18	at George Washington	No. 14	Griffith Stadium; Washington D.C.	W 39–0	9,500	
October 25	No. 15 Duke	No. 11	Groves Stadium; Wake Forest, NC (rivalry)	L 6–13	25,000	
November 1	at William & Mary	No. 15	Cary Field; Williamsburg, VA	L 0–21	17,000	
November 8	at Boston College*		Braves Field; Boston, MA	W 14–13	30,000	
November 15	at NC State		Riddick Stadium; Raleigh, NC (rivalry)	L 0–20	20,000	
November 21	vs. Duquesne*		Bowman Gray Stadium; Winston-Salem, NC	W 33–0	10,000	
November 27	vs. South Carolina		American Legion Memorial Stadium; Charlotte, NC	L 0–6	17,000	
*Non-conference game; Rankings from AP Poll released prior to the game

== Rankings ==
Ranking movements Legend: ██ Increase in ranking ██ Decrease in ranking — = Not ranked ( ) = First-place votes
	Week									
Poll	1	2	3	4	5	6	7	8	9	Final
AP	—	14 (2)	11	15	—	—	—	—	—	—
