= Robert Mitten =

Robert Mitten may refer to:

- Robert Mitten (American football) (1928–1972), American football player
- Robert Mitten (racing driver) (born 1963), American auto racing driver
