= 1947 Richmond Spiders football team =

American college football season

1947 Richmond Spiders football
- Conference: Southern Conference
- Record: 3–7 (1–5 SoCon)
- Head coach: John Fenlon (3rd season)
- Captains: Joe LaLuna; Carroll Richard
- Home stadium: City Stadium

1947 Southern Conference football standings
	Conf.					Overall
Team	W		L		T	W		L		T
No. 14 William & Mary $	7	–	1	–	0	9	–	2	–	0
No. 9 North Carolina	4	–	1	–	0	8	–	2	–	0
South Carolina	4	–	1	–	1	6	–	2	–	1
No. 19 Duke	3	–	1	–	1	4	–	3	–	2
Washington and Lee	3	–	2	–	0	5	–	5	–	0
Maryland	3	–	2	–	1	7	–	2	–	2
No. 17 NC State	3	–	2	–	1	5	–	3	–	1
VPI	4	–	3	–	0	4	–	5	–	0
Davidson	3	–	3	–	1	6	–	3	–	1
Wake Forest	3	–	4	–	0	6	–	4	–	0
VMI	2	–	3	–	1	3	–	5	–	1
Clemson	1	–	3	–	0	4	–	5	–	0
The Citadel	1	–	4	–	0	3	–	5	–	0
Furman	1	–	4	–	0	2	–	7	–	0
Richmond	1	–	5	–	0	3	–	7	–	0
George Washington	0	–	4	–	0	1	–	7	–	1
$ – Conference champion; Rankings from AP Poll

The 1947 Richmond Spiders football team was an American football team that represented the University of Richmond in the 1947 college football season. In its third and final season under head coach John Fenlon, the team compiled a 3–7 record (1–5 against conference opponents), finished in 15th place in the conference, and was outscored by a total of 189 to 106.

In the final Litkenhous Ratings released in mid-December, Richmond was ranked at No. 143 out of 500 college football teams.

The team played its home games at City Stadium in Richmond, Virginia.

== Schedule ==
Date	Opponent	Site	Result	Attendance	Source
September 20	Randolph–Macon*	City Stadium; Richmond, VA	W 28–7	10,000	
September 27	Washington and Lee	City Stadium; Richmond, VA	L 3–16	11,000	
October 4	at Rollins*	Orlando, FL	L 7–20	6,500	
October 10	at Maryland	Byrd Stadium; College Park, MD	L 6–18		
October 18	VMI	City Stadium; Richmond, VA	W 21–20	8,000	
October 25	Hampden-Sydney*	City Stadium; Richmond, VA	W 20–0	4,000	
November 1	at No. 12 Virginia*	Scott Stadium; Charlottesville, VA	L 0–34	12,000	
November 8	Davidson	City Stadium; Richmond, VA	L 7–13	3,000	
November 15	at VPI	Miles Stadium; Blacksburg, VA	L 14–26	5,500	
November 27	No. 14 William & Mary	City Stadium; Richmond, VA (rivalry)	L 0–35	15,000	
*Non-conference game; Rankings from AP Poll released prior to the game
