= 1947 Clemson Tigers football team =

American college football season

1947 Clemson Tigers football
- Conference: Southern Conference
- Record: 4–5 (1–3 SoCon)
- Head coach: Frank Howard (8th season)
- Captain: Cary Cox
- Home stadium: Memorial Stadium

1947 Southern Conference football standings
	Conf.					Overall
Team	W		L		T	W		L		T
No. 14 William & Mary $	7	–	1	–	0	9	–	2	–	0
No. 9 North Carolina	4	–	1	–	0	8	–	2	–	0
South Carolina	4	–	1	–	1	6	–	2	–	1
No. 19 Duke	3	–	1	–	1	4	–	3	–	2
Washington and Lee	3	–	2	–	0	5	–	5	–	0
Maryland	3	–	2	–	1	7	–	2	–	2
No. 17 NC State	3	–	2	–	1	5	–	3	–	1
VPI	4	–	3	–	0	4	–	5	–	0
Davidson	3	–	3	–	1	6	–	3	–	1
Wake Forest	3	–	4	–	0	6	–	4	–	0
VMI	2	–	3	–	1	3	–	5	–	1
Clemson	1	–	3	–	0	4	–	5	–	0
The Citadel	1	–	4	–	0	3	–	5	–	0
Furman	1	–	4	–	0	2	–	7	–	0
Richmond	1	–	5	–	0	3	–	7	–	0
George Washington	0	–	4	–	0	1	–	7	–	1
$ – Conference champion; Rankings from AP Poll

The 1947 Clemson Tigers football team was an American football team that represented Clemson College during the 1947 college football season. In its eighth season under head coach Frank Howard, the team compiled a 4–5 record (1–3 against conference opponents) and outscored opponents by a total of 206 to 146.

Cary Cox was the team captain. The team's statistical leaders included tailback Bobby Gage with 1,002 passing yards and 502 rushing yards and wingback Jim Reynolds with 48 points scored (8 touchdowns).

Three Clemson player were named to the 1947 All-South Carolina football team: guard Frank Gillespie, center Cary Cox, and back Bobby Gage.

Clemson was ranked at No. 69 (out of 500 college football teams) in the final Litkenhous Ratings for 1947.

The team played its home games at Memorial Stadium in Clemson, South Carolina.

== Schedule ==
Date	Time	Opponent	Site	Result	Attendance	Source
September 20	3:00 p.m.	Presbyterian*	Memorial Stadium; Clemson, SC	W 42–0	13,000	
September 26	8:30 p.m.	at Boston College*	Braves Field; Boston, MA (rivalry)	L 22–32	30,000	
October 4	3:00 p.m.	Wake Forest	Memorial Stadium; Clemson, SC	L 14–16	14,000	
October 11	8:00 p.m.	at NC State	Riddick Stadium; Raleigh, NC (rivalry)	L 0–18	20,000	
October 23	2:00 p.m.	at South Carolina	Carolina Stadium; Columbia, SC (rivalry)	L 19–21	25,000	
October 31	8:15 p.m.	at Georgia*	Sanford Stadium; Athens, GA (rivalry)	L 6–21	18,000	
November 8	2:30 p.m.	at Furman	Sirrine Stadium; Greenville, SC	W 35–7	18,000	
November 15	8:15 p.m.	at Duquesne*	Forbes Field; Pittsburgh, PA	W 34–13	5,000	
November 22	2:00 p.m.	Auburn*^{†}	Memorial Stadium; Clemson, SC (rivalry)	W 34–18	11,000	
*Non-conference game; ^{†}Homecoming; All times are in Eastern time
