= 1947 South Carolina Gamecocks football team =

American college football season

1947 South Carolina Gamecocks football
- Conference: Southern Conference
- Record: 6–2–1 (4–1–1 SoCon)
- Head coach: Rex Enright (7th season)
- Captain: Neil Allen
- Home stadium: Carolina Municipal Stadium

1947 Southern Conference football standings
	Conf.					Overall
Team	W		L		T	W		L		T
No. 14 William & Mary $	7	–	1	–	0	9	–	2	–	0
No. 9 North Carolina	4	–	1	–	0	8	–	2	–	0
South Carolina	4	–	1	–	1	6	–	2	–	1
No. 19 Duke	3	–	1	–	1	4	–	3	–	2
Washington and Lee	3	–	2	–	0	5	–	5	–	0
Maryland	3	–	2	–	1	7	–	2	–	2
No. 17 NC State	3	–	2	–	1	5	–	3	–	1
VPI	4	–	3	–	0	4	–	5	–	0
Davidson	3	–	3	–	1	6	–	3	–	1
Wake Forest	3	–	4	–	0	6	–	4	–	0
VMI	2	–	3	–	1	3	–	5	–	1
Clemson	1	–	3	–	0	4	–	5	–	0
The Citadel	1	–	4	–	0	3	–	5	–	0
Furman	1	–	4	–	0	2	–	7	–	0
Richmond	1	–	5	–	0	3	–	7	–	0
George Washington	0	–	4	–	0	1	–	7	–	1
$ – Conference champion; Rankings from AP Poll

The 1947 South Carolina Gamecocks football team was an American football team that represented the University of South Carolina as a member of the Southern Conference (SoCon) during the 1947 college football season. In its seventh season under head coach Rex Enright, the team compiled a 6–2–1 record (4–1–1 against conference opponents), finished in third place in the conference, and outscored opponents by a total of 113 to 85.

South Carolina was ranked at No. 72 (out of 500 college football teams) in the final Litkenhous Ratings for 1947.

== Schedule ==
Date	Opponent	Site	Result	Attendance	Source
September 20	Newberry*	Carolina Stadium; Columbia, SC	W 27–6	12,500	
September 27	Maryland	Carolina Stadium; Columbia, SC	L 13–19	13,000	
October 4	vs. Ole Miss*	Crump Stadium; Memphis, TN	L 0–33	12,000	
October 11	Furman	Carolina Stadium; Columbia, SC	W 26–8	13,500	
October 23	Clemson	Carolina Stadium; Columbia, SC (rivalry)	W 21–19	25,000	
October 31	at Miami (FL)*	Burdine Stadium; Miami, FL	W 8–0	28,454	
November 7	vs. The Citadel	County Fairgrounds; Orangeburg, SC	W 12–0	11,000	
November 15	at Duke	Duke Stadium; Durham, NC	T 0–0	5,000	
November 27	vs. Wake Forest	American Legion Memorial Stadium; Charlotte, NC	W 6–0	17,000	
*Non-conference game
