= 1948 Little All-America college football team =

American college football all-star team

The 1948 Little All-America college football team is composed of college football players from small colleges and universities who were selected by the Associated Press (AP) as the best players at each position. For 1948, the AP selected first, second, and third teams. Back Eddie LeBaron of Pacific and guard James Nelson of Missouri Valley were chosen for the first team for the second consecutive year.

== First-team ==
Position	Player	Team
B	Lynn Chewning	Hampden–Sydney
B	V. T. Smith	Abilene Christian
B	Eddie LeBaron	Pacific
B	Jack Slascheider	St. Thomas (MN)
E	John Caskey	Appalachian State
E	Frank LoVuolo	St. Bonaventure
T	Ralph Hutchinson	Chattanooga
T	Jack Geary	Wesleyan (CT)
G	James Nelson	Missouri Valley
G	Robert Osgood	Central Washington
C	William Wehr	Denison

== Second-team ==
Position	Player	Team
B	Lawrence Orr	Adams State
B	Alva Baker	Missouri Valley
B	Fred Wendt	Texas Mines
B	Dan Towler	Washington & Jefferson
E	Richard Brown	Puget Sound
E	William Klein	Hanover
T	Raymond Evans	Texas Mines
T	Manuel Bass	Caltech
G	Art Oley	Randolph–Macon
G	James Clary	Wofford
C	Jason Loving	Iowa State Teachers

== Third-team ==
Position	Player	Team
B	Lee Spear	Catawba
B	Herman Bryson	Appalachian State
B	Edward Rupp	Denison
B	Roland Malcolm	Gustavus Adolphus
E	Andy Robustelli	Arnold
E	Douglas Loveday	Wofford
T	Thomas Donan	Bloomsburg State
T	William Oaks	Augustana (IL)
G	Johnson Waldrum	Sul Ross
G	Rudolph Smith	Louisiana Tech
C	Robert Basich	St. Martin's

== See also ==
- 1948 College Football All-America Team
