= Sam Tamburo =

American football player (1926–1998)

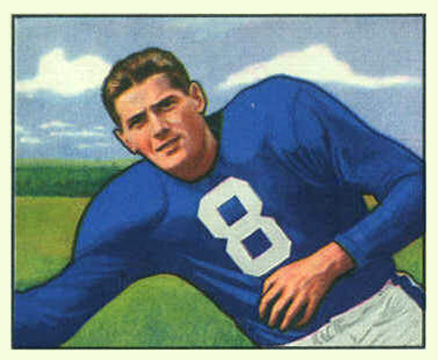
- Tamburo on a 1950 Bowman football card

No. 8
- Position: Defensive end

Personal information
- Born: July 1, 1926; New Kensington, Pennsylvania, U.S.
- Died: December 18, 1998 (aged 72); New Kensington, Pennsylvania, U.S.
- Listed height: 6 ft 2 in (1.88 m)
- Listed weight: 200 lb (91 kg)

Career information
- College: Penn State (1945–1948)
- NFL draft: 1949: 6th round, 61st overall pick

Career history
- New York Bulldogs (1949); New York Yanks (1950)*; Pittsburgh Steelers (1950)*
- * Offseason or practice squad member only

Awards and highlights
- First-team All-American (1948); First-team All-Eastern (1948)
- Stats at Pro Football Reference

Samuel Joseph Tamburo Jr. (July 1, 1926 – December 18, 1998) was an American professional football defensive end who played one season with the New York Bulldogs of the National Football League (NFL). He was selected by the Bulldogs in the sixth round of the 1949 NFL draft after playing college football at Pennsylvania State University.

== Early life ==
Samuel Joseph Tamburo Jr. was born on July 1, 1926, in New Kensington, Pennsylvania. He played high school football at New Kensington High School, and earned all-state honors in 1943. Tamburo was inducted into the Alle-Kiski Valley Sports Hall of Fame in 2015.

== College career ==
Tamburo was a four-year letterman for the Penn State Nittany Lions of Pennsylvania State University from 1945 to 1948. In 1945, due to Jim Crow laws, Penn State was not allowed to bring its African-American players, Wally Tripplet and Dennis Hoggard, to a late-season matchup against the Miami Hurricanes. The players then held a vote on whether or not to cancel the game. When it was suggested by another player that Tripplet and Hoggard leave the room before the vote, Tamburo stated "No, they're part of the team. We are all Penn Staters." The team unanimously voted to cancel the game. Tripplet later said of Tamburo “Sam was my man. He was one of the guys who stood up when people thought America wasn't what it should be.” Tamburo was named first-team All-Eastern at end in 1948 by both the Associated Press (AP) and International News Service (INS). Also in 1948, he earned American Football Coaches Association first-team All-American, AP third-team All-American, INS first-team All-American (offense), and Central Press Association second-team All-American honors. Tamburo played in the Hula Bowl after his senior season.

== Professional career ==
Tamburo was selected by the New York Bulldogs in the sixth round, with the 61st overall pick, of the 1949 NFL draft and by the Chicago Hornets in the sixth round, with the 38th overall pick, of the 1949 AAFC draft. He decided to sign with the Bulldogs on March 29, 1949. He played in all 12 games, starting two, for the Bulldogs during the 1949 season.

Tamburo signed with the New York Yanks of the National Football League (NFL) on June 30, 1950. However, he was later released.

Tamburo then signed with the Pittsburgh Steelers of the NFL. He was released by the Steelers on September 15, 1950.

== Personal life ==
Tamburo died on December 18, 1998, in New Kensington.
