= 1947 Davidson Wildcats football team =

American college football season

1947 Davidson Wildcats football
- Conference: Southern Conference
- Record: 6–3–1 (3–3–1 SoCon)
- Head coach: William Story (2nd season)
- Home stadium: Richardson Stadium; American Legion Memorial Stadium

1947 Southern Conference football standings
	Conf.					Overall
Team	W		L		T	W		L		T
No. 14 William & Mary $	7	–	1	–	0	9	–	2	–	0
No. 9 North Carolina	4	–	1	–	0	8	–	2	–	0
South Carolina	4	–	1	–	1	6	–	2	–	1
No. 19 Duke	3	–	1	–	1	4	–	3	–	2
Washington and Lee	3	–	2	–	0	5	–	5	–	0
Maryland	3	–	2	–	1	7	–	2	–	2
No. 17 NC State	3	–	2	–	1	5	–	3	–	1
VPI	4	–	3	–	0	4	–	5	–	0
Davidson	3	–	3	–	1	6	–	3	–	1
Wake Forest	3	–	4	–	0	6	–	4	–	0
VMI	2	–	3	–	1	3	–	5	–	1
Clemson	1	–	3	–	0	4	–	5	–	0
The Citadel	1	–	4	–	0	3	–	5	–	0
Furman	1	–	4	–	0	2	–	7	–	0
Richmond	1	–	5	–	0	3	–	7	–	0
George Washington	0	–	4	–	0	1	–	7	–	1
$ – Conference champion; Rankings from AP Poll

The 1947 Davidson Wildcats football team was an American football team that represented Davidson University as a member of the Southern Conference during the 1947 college football season. In its second season under head coach William Story, the team compiled a 6–3–1 record (3–3–1 against conference opponents) and outscored opponents by a total of 155 to 108

In the final Litkenhous Ratings released in mid-December, Davidson was ranked at No. 121 out of 500 college football teams.

The team played its home games at Richardson Stadium in Davidson, North Carolina.

== Schedule ==
Date	Opponent	Site	Result	Attendance	Source
September 20	Elon*	Richardson Stadium; Davidson, NC	W 19–0		
September 27	vs. William & Mary	Foreman Field; Norfolk, VA	L 0–21	9,000	
October 4	NC State	American Legion Memorial Stadium; Charlotte, NC	L 0–14	15,000	
October 11	Wofford*	American Legion Memorial Stadium; Charlotte, NC	W 12–7	3,000	
October 18	at Hampden–Sydney*	Hampden Sydney, VA	W 49–0		
October 25	at Washington and Lee	Wilson Field; Lexington, VA	L 0–32		
November 1	VMI	Richardson Stadium; Davidson, NC	T 14–14		
November 8	at Richmond	City Stadium; Richmond, VA	W 13–7	3,000	
November 22	The Citadel	Richardson Stadium; Davidson, NC	W 28–7	5,000	
November 27	at Furman	Sirrine Stadium; Greenville, SC	W 20–6	8,000	
*Non-conference game
