= Jon Jenkins (American football) =

American football player (1926–1999)

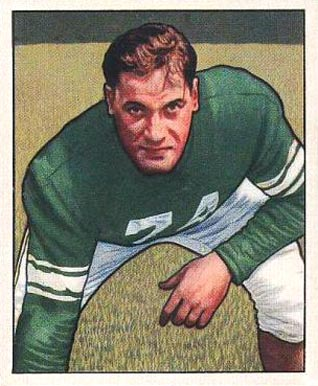
- Jenkins on a 1950 Bowman football card

No. 47, 85
- Position: Tackle

Personal information
- Born: June 17, 1926; Frostburg, Maryland, U.S.
- Died: June 30, 1999 (aged 73); Frostburg, Maryland, U.S.
- Listed height: 6 ft 2 in (1.88 m)
- Listed weight: 225 lb (102 kg)

Career information
- High school: St. Christopher's Academy (Richmond, Virginia)
- College: Dartmouth (1945–1948)
- NFL draft: 1949: 9th round, 91st overall pick

Career history
- Baltimore Colts (1949–1950); New York Yanks (1950)

Awards and highlights
- Second-team All-Eastern (1948)

Career NFL/AAFC statistics
- Games played: 15
- Games started: 3
- Stats at Pro Football Reference

Jonathan R. Jenkins (June 17, 1926 – June 30, 1999) was an American professional football tackle who played two seasons in the National Football League (NFL) and All-America Football Conference (AAFC) with the Baltimore Colts and New York Yanks. He played college football at Dartmouth College.

== Early life and college ==
Jonathan R. Jenkins was born on June 17, 1926, in Frostburg, Maryland. He attended St. Christopher's Academy in Richmond, Virginia.

Jenkins was a member of the Dartmouth Big Green from 1945 to 1948 and a three-year letterman from 1946 to 1948. He was named second-team All-Eastern by the Associated Press his senior year in 1948. He was inducted into Dartmouth's athletics hall of fame in 2004.

== Professional career ==
Jenkins was selected by the Philadelphia Eagles in the ninth round, with the 91st overall pick, of the 1949 NFL draft, and by the Baltimore Colts in the 15th round, with the 113th overall pick, of the 1949 AAFC draft. He chose to sign with the Colts. He played in 11 games, starting three, for the Colts during the 1949 season. Jenkins became a free agent after the season and re-signed with the Colts, who were now a member of the NFL, on July 11, 1950. He was released on September 12 but re-signed soon after. He then appeared in three games for the Colts in 1950 before being released on October 3, 1950.

Jenkins was signed by the New York Yanks of the NFL on October 10, 1950. He played in one game for the Yanks before his release on October 21, 1950.

== Personal life ==
Jenkins died on June 30, 1999, in Frostburg.
