= 1947 George Washington Colonials football team =

American college football season

1947 George Washington Colonials football
- Conference: Southern Conference
- Record: 1–7–1 (0–4 SoCon)
- Head coach: Skip Stahley (2nd season)
- Home stadium: Griffith Stadium

1947 Southern Conference football standings
	Conf.					Overall
Team	W		L		T	W		L		T
No. 14 William & Mary $	7	–	1	–	0	9	–	2	–	0
No. 9 North Carolina	4	–	1	–	0	8	–	2	–	0
South Carolina	4	–	1	–	1	6	–	2	–	1
No. 19 Duke	3	–	1	–	1	4	–	3	–	2
Washington and Lee	3	–	2	–	0	5	–	5	–	0
Maryland	3	–	2	–	1	7	–	2	–	2
No. 17 NC State	3	–	2	–	1	5	–	3	–	1
VPI	4	–	3	–	0	4	–	5	–	0
Davidson	3	–	3	–	1	6	–	3	–	1
Wake Forest	3	–	4	–	0	6	–	4	–	0
VMI	2	–	3	–	1	3	–	5	–	1
Clemson	1	–	3	–	0	4	–	5	–	0
The Citadel	1	–	4	–	0	3	–	5	–	0
Furman	1	–	4	–	0	2	–	7	–	0
Richmond	1	–	5	–	0	3	–	7	–	0
George Washington	0	–	4	–	0	1	–	7	–	1
$ – Conference champion; Rankings from AP Poll

The 1947 George Washington Colonials football team was an American football team that represented George Washington University as a member of the Southern Conference (SoCon) during the 1947 college football season. In its second and final season under head coach Skip Stahley, the team compiled a 1–7–1 record (0–4 in conference games), finished 16th in the SoCon, and was outscored by a total of 177 to 92.

In the final Litkenhous Ratings released in mid-December, George Washington was ranked at No. 134 out of 500 college football teams.

== Schedule ==
Date	Opponent	Site	Result	Attendance	Source
September 27	at Virginia*	Scott Stadium; Charlottesville, VA	L 13–33	15,000	
October 4	at VMI	Alumni Field; Lexington, VA	L 7–13		
October 11	at Washington & Lee	Wilson Field; Lexington, VA	L 6–15		
October 18	No. 14 Wake Forest	Griffith Stadium; Washington, DC	L 7–39	9,500	
October 24	at Miami (FL)*	Burdine Stadium; Miami, FL	L 7–28	25,746	
October 31	VPI^{†}	Griffith Stadium; Washington, DC	L 6–42	5,000	
November 15	at Wayne*	Keyworth Stadium; Detroit, MI	L 6–7	1,097	
November 22	vs. Georgetown*	Griffith Stadium; Washington, DC	T 0–0	11,000	
November 27	Merchant Marine*	Griffith Stadium; Washington, DC	W 40–0	< 4,000	
*Non-conference game; ^{†}Homecoming; Rankings from AP Poll released prior to the game
