= John Maskas =

American football player (1920–)

- Maskas, circa 1949

No. 34, 49
- Position: Guard

Personal information
- Born: August 15, 1920; Chios, Greece
- Died: February 9, 1983 (aged 62); Manahawkin, New Jersey, U.S.
- Listed height: 5 ft 11 in (1.80 m)
- Listed weight: 212 lb (96 kg)

Career information
- High school: Monessen (Monessen, Pennsylvania)
- College: VPI (1941, 1942, 1946); North Carolina (1943)
- NFL draft: 1944: 14th round, 142nd overall pick

Career history
- Buffalo Bills (1947); Boston Yanks (1948)*; Buffalo Bills (1949)
- * Offseason or practice squad member only

Awards and highlights
- 2× First-team All-Southern (1943, 1946)
- Stats at Pro Football Reference

John James Maskas (August 15, 1920 – February 9, 1983) was a Greek-American professional football guard who played for the Buffalo Bills of the All-America Football Conference (AAFC). He played college football for the VPI Gobblers and North Carolina Tar Heels, and was selected by the Boston Yanks in the 14th round of the 1944 NFL draft.

== Early life ==
John James Maskas was born on August 15, 1920, in Chios, Greece. He immigrated to the United States as a child. He attended Monessen High School in Monessen, Pennsylvania.

== College career ==
Maskas enrolled at the Virginia Agricultural and Mechanical College and Polytechnic Institute to play college football for the VPI Gobblers. He was a letterman in 1941 and 1942. He transferred to the University of North Carolina, where he was a letterman for the Tar Heels in 1943. Maskas was named first-team All-Southern Conference by the Associated Press (AP) at tackle for his performance during the 1943 season. He then served in the United States Marine Corps during World War II, and was a veteran of the Battle of Guadalcanal. Maskas returned to VPI in 1946, and earned another varsity letter while also serving as a team captain. He garnered AP and United Press first-team All-Southern Conference recognition for the 1946 season at tackle. He wrestled and boxed at VPI as well.

== Professional career ==
Maskas was selected by the Boston Yanks in the 14th round, with the 142nd overall pick, of the 1944 NFL draft. He was later selected by the Buffalo Bills in the 10th round, with the 74th overall pick, of the 1947 AAFC draft. He played in seven or nine games for the Bills during the 1947 AAFC season as a reserve guard. Maskas was released on November 5, 1947.

Maskas signed with the Yanks on July 19, 1948. However, he was released before ever playing for the Yanks.

Maskas was signed by the Bills again on April 8, 1949. He played in 11 or 12 games for Buffalo during the 1949 AAFC season. (Note: Pro Football Archives credits Maskas with seven starts in 1949 while Pro Football Reference credits him with zero.) The Bills folded after the season and Maskas was selected by the San Francisco 49ers in the 1950 AAFC dispersal draft.

== Personal life ==
Maskas graduated from the University of Pittsburgh with a master's degree in education. He was a high school teacher and coach for decades in Ohio, Pennsylvania, and New Jersey. He died of a heart attack on February 9, 1983, in Manahawkin, New Jersey. Maskas was inducted into the AHEPA Hellenic Athletic Hall of Fame in 1983.
