= Pat Preston =

American football player, coach, and administrator (1921–2002)

No. 53
- Position: Guard

Personal information
- Born: June 15, 1921; Kernersville, North Carolina, U.S.
- Died: June 23, 2002 (aged 81); Mount Airy, North Carolina, U.S.
- Listed height: 6 ft 2 in (1.88 m)
- Listed weight: 216 lb (98 kg)

Career information
- College: Wake Forest (1939-1942); Duke (1943)
- NFL draft: 1943: 17th round, 159th overall pick

Career history

Playing
- Chicago Bears (1946–1949)

Coaching
- Montreal Alouettes (1959) Line coach

Awards and highlights
- NFL champion (1946); First-team All-American (1943); 2× First-team All-SoCon (1942, 1943)

Career NFL statistics
- Games played: 38
- Games started: 14
- Fumble recoveries: 7
- Stats at Pro Football Reference

Paddison Wade "Pat" Preston (June 15, 1921 – June 23, 2002) was an American professional football player and coach and college athletics administrator. He played professionally as a guard for four seasons in the National Football League (NFL) with the Chicago Bears. Preston served as the athletic director at Wake Forest University from 1954 to 1955.
