= Bill Milner (American football) =

American football player (1922–2006)

No. 38, 61
- Positions: Linebacker, guard, defensive end

Personal information
- Born: March 7, 1922; Waynesville, North Carolina, U.S.
- Died: December 25, 2006 (aged 84); Waynesville, North Carolina, U.S.
- Listed height: 6 ft 1 in (1.85 m)
- Listed weight: 228 lb (103 kg)

Career information
- High school: Waynesville
- College: South Carolina; Duke
- NFL draft: 1944: 15th round, 150th overall pick

Career history
- Chicago Bears (1947–1949); New York Giants (1950)

Awards and highlights
- 2× First-team All-SoCon (1943, 1946)

Career NFL statistics
- Games played: 48
- Games started: 18
- Fumble recoveries: 3
- Stats at Pro Football Reference

Charles Edgar "Bill" Milner (March 7, 1922 – December 25, 2006) was an American professional football player who was an offensive lineman for three seasons for the Chicago Bears and New York Giants.
