= Hosea Rodgers =

American football player (1921–2001)

- Rodgers, circa 1950

No. 73
- Position: Fullback

Personal information
- Born: December 25, 1921; Brewton, Alabama, U.S.
- Died: April 9, 2001 (aged 79); Brewton, Alabama, U.S.
- Listed height: 6 ft 1 in (1.85 m)
- Listed weight: 192 lb (87 kg)

Career information
- High school: T. R. Miller (Brewton)
- College: North Carolina
- NFL draft: 1946: 3rd round, 20th overall pick

Career history
- Los Angeles Dons (1949); Philadelphia Eagles (1950)*
- * Offseason or practice squad member only

Awards and highlights
- First-team All-Southern (1943); Second-team All-Southern (1948); Third-team All-Southern (1946)
- Stats at Pro Football Reference

Hosea Weaver Rodgers (December 25, 1921 – April 9, 2001) was an American professional football fullback who played for the Los Angeles Dons of the All-America Football Conference (AAFC). He played college football for the Alabama Crimson Tide and North Carolina Tar Heels, and was selected by the New York Giants in the third round of the 1946 NFL draft.

== Early life ==
Hosea Weaver Rodgers was born on December 25, 1921, in Brewton, Alabama. He played high school football at T. R. Miller High School in Brewton, earning All-Southern honors as a senior.

== College career ==
In 1942, Rodgers enrolled at the University of Alabama to play college football for the Crimson Tide. He was the only freshman on the varsity team during the 1942 season. He recorded three carries for a 26.6-yard average and one punt return for 29 yards. Rodgers was the first freshman in school history to make a bowl game trip (the 1943 Orange Bowl against Boston College). He replicated Boston College fullback Mike Holovak during practices.

In 1943, Rodgers transferred to the University of North Carolina (UNC) to play for the Tar Heels. He rushed 83 times for a team-leading 461 yards and five touchdowns during the 1943 season, earning Associated Press (AP) first-team all-Southern Conference honors. He served in the United States Marine Corps during World War II. Rodgers returned to UNC, where he was a three-year letterman from 1946 to 1948. He was named AP third-team All-Southern Conference in 1946 and AP second-team All-Southern Conference in 1948. He was also a team captain in 1948.

== Professional career ==
Rodgers was selected by the New York Giants in the third round, with the 20th overall pick, of the 1946 NFL draft. On December 21, 1948, he was selected by the Los Angeles Dons in the third round, with the 18th overall pick, of the 1949 AAFC draft. Rodgers signed with the Dons on January 17, 1949. He played in all 12 games, starting nine, for Los Angeles during the 1949 season, recording 131 carries for 494 yards and five touchdowns while also catching seven passes for 97 yards. He led the team in all three rushing categories.

On June 2, 1950, Rodgers was selected by the Philadelphia Eagles in the sixth round, with the 84th overall pick, of the 1950 AAFC dispersal draft. In August 1950, he left Eagles' training camp to rejoin the Marine Corps. He played on a service team while in the military.

== Personal life ==
Rodgers graduated from UNC with a geology degree. He worked at the Container Corporation of America for 28 years. On April 9, 2001, Rodgers died at his home in Brewton.
