= 1947 The Citadel Bulldogs football team =

American college football season

1947 The Citadel Bulldogs football
- Conference: Southern Conference
- Record: 3–5 (1–4 SoCon)
- Head coach: J. Quinn Decker (2nd season)
- Home stadium: Johnson Hagood Stadium

1947 Southern Conference football standings
	Conf.					Overall
Team	W		L		T	W		L		T
No. 14 William & Mary $	7	–	1	–	0	9	–	2	–	0
No. 9 North Carolina	4	–	1	–	0	8	–	2	–	0
South Carolina	4	–	1	–	1	6	–	2	–	1
No. 19 Duke	3	–	1	–	1	4	–	3	–	2
Washington and Lee	3	–	2	–	0	5	–	5	–	0
Maryland	3	–	2	–	1	7	–	2	–	2
No. 17 NC State	3	–	2	–	1	5	–	3	–	1
VPI	4	–	3	–	0	4	–	5	–	0
Davidson	3	–	3	–	1	6	–	3	–	1
Wake Forest	3	–	4	–	0	6	–	4	–	0
VMI	2	–	3	–	1	3	–	5	–	1
Clemson	1	–	3	–	0	4	–	5	–	0
The Citadel	1	–	4	–	0	3	–	5	–	0
Furman	1	–	4	–	0	2	–	7	–	0
Richmond	1	–	5	–	0	3	–	7	–	0
George Washington	0	–	4	–	0	1	–	7	–	1
$ – Conference champion; Rankings from AP Poll

The 1947 The Citadel Bulldogs football team represented The Citadel, The Military College of South Carolina in the 1947 college football season. J. Quinn Decker served as head coach for the second season. The Bulldogs played as members of the Southern Conference and played home games at Johnson Hagood Stadium.

In the final Litkenhous Ratings released in mid-December, The Citadel was ranked at No. 182 out of 500 college football teams.

== Schedule ==
Date	Opponent	Site	Result	Attendance	Source
September 27	Presbyterian*	Johnson Hagood Stadium; Charleston, SC	W 13–6		
October 4	at William & Mary	Cary Field; Williamsburg, VA	L 7–56	6,000	
October 11	Newberry	Johnson Hagood Stadium; Charleston, SC	W 13–6		
October 17	at Furman	Sirrine Stadium; Greenville, SC (rivalry)	L 0–7	9,000	
October 25	at No. 7 Georgia Tech*	Grant Field; Atlanta, GA	L 0–38	20,000	
November 7	vs. South Carolina	County Fairgrounds; Orangeburg, SC	L 0–12	11,000	
November 15	VMI	Johnson Hagood Stadium; Charleston, SC (rivalry)	W 7–6	6,700	
November 22	at Davidson	Richardson Stadium; Davidson, NA	L 7–28	5,000	
*Non-conference game; Rankings from AP Poll released prior to the game
