= Nick Sacrinty =

American football player (1924–2008)

No. 4
- Position: Quarterback

Personal information
- Born: June 10, 1924; Reidsville, North Carolina, U.S.
- Died: April 16, 2008 (aged 83); Eden, North Carolina, U.S.
- Listed height: 5 ft 11 in (1.80 m)
- Listed weight: 185 lb (84 kg)

Career information
- High school: Reidsville
- College: Wake Forest (1943-1946)
- NFL draft: 1945: 17th round, 172nd overall pick

Career history
- Chicago Bears (1947)

Awards and highlights
- 3× First-team All-SoCon (1943, 1945, 1946)

Career NFL statistics
- Passing yards: 299
- TD–INT: 5-3
- Passer rating: 62.8
- Stats at Pro Football Reference

Nick Sacrinty (June 10, 1924 – April 16, 2008) was an American professional football player who was a quarterback in the National Football League (NFL). He played college football for the Wake Forest Demon Deacons from 1943 to 1946 and was inducted into the Wake Forest Sports Hall of Fame in 1982. He played for the Chicago Bears in 1947.

He died on April 16, 2008, in Eden, North Carolina, at age 83.
