= 1948 All-Eastern football team =

American all-star college football team

The 1948 All-Eastern football team consists of American football players chosen by various selectors as the best players at each position among the Eastern colleges and universities during the 1948 college football season.

== All-Eastern selections ==
=== Backs ===
- Lou Kusserow, Columbia (AP-1; INS-1)
- Bobby Stuart, Army (AP-1; INS-1)
- Levi Jackson, Yale (AP-1; INS-2)
- George Sella, Princeton (AP-1)
- John Clayton, Dartmouth (INS-1)
- Bernie Custis, Syracuse (INS-1)
- Fran Rogel, Penn State (AP-2; INS-2)
- Gene Rossides, Columbia (AP-2; INS-2)
- Gil Stephenson, Army (AP-2)
- Ed Finn, Brown (AP-2)
- Joe Sullivan, Dartmouth (INS-2)

=== Ends ===
- Dale Armstrong, Dartmouth (AP-1; INS-1)
- Sam Tamburo, Penn State (AP-1; INS-1)
- Frank LoVuolo, St. Bonaventure (AP-2; INS-2)
- Dan Foldberg, Army (AP-2)
- George Sulima, Boston University (INS-2)

=== Tackles ===
- Ernie Stautner, Boston College (AP-1; INS-2)
- Richard Clark, Cornell (AP-1)
- Henry Drost, Cornell (INS-1)
- Howard Houston, Harvard (INS-1)
- Jack Geary, Wesleyan (AP-2)
- Jon Jenkins, Dartmouth (AP-2)
- Lenox Palin, Princeton (INS-2)

=== Guards ===
- Joseph Henry, Army (AP-1; INS-1)
- Joseph Drazenovich, Penn State (AP-1)
- Kelly, Penn State (INS-1)
- Dolph Tokarczyk, Penn (AP-2; INS-2)
- Joseph Quinn, Cornell (AP-2)
- Boelkovac, Pittsburgh (INS-2)

=== Centers ===
- Chuck Bednarik, Penn (AP-1; INS-1)
- Bill Yeoman, Army (AP-2; INS-2)

== Key ==
- AP = Associated Press
- INS = International News Service

== See also ==
- 1948 College Football All-America Team
