= 1966 Tangerine Bowl =

American college football game

West Chester Golden Rams	Morgan State Bears
(8–2)	(8–0)
Pennsylvania State Colleges; Football Conference	Central Intercollegiate; Athletic Association
6	14
Head coach: Bob Mitten	Head coach: Earl Banks
	1	2	3	4	Total
West Chester	0	0	0	6	6
Morgan State	0	7	0	7	14
- Date: December 10, 1966
- Season: 1966
- Stadium: Tangerine Bowl
- Location: Orlando, Florida
- MVP: Willie Lanier
- Attendance: 7138

The 1966 Tangerine Bowl was an NCAA College Division game following the 1966 season, between the West Chester Golden Rams and the Morgan State Bears. Morgan State linebacker Willie Lanier was named the game's most valuable player.

== Background ==
The game was one of four regional finals in the College Division, the predecessor of Division II; the other three postseason games were the Pecan, Grantland Rice, and Camellia bowls, also played on December 10.

In 1965, Morgan State defeated Florida A&M in the Orange Blossom Classic, which was the unofficial championship game for historically black colleges and universities. In 1966, Morgan State, led by Lanier, was invited to play in the Tangerine Bowl. The Bears were on a 17-game winning streak going into the Tangerine Bowl, and based on that and their 1965 victory, they merited inclusion on their quality of play.

Inviting the Bears, however, represented a significant social change. It would be the first time that a team from an historically black college was invited to play in the game in central Florida. Orlando, the city where the game would be played, had never hosted an integrated high school or college football game. Orlando's mayor Bob Carr decided to end the practice that limited participation in the game to all white teams. The game's hosts made sure the two teams were treated equally, and mingled with each other at events before the game. ABC covered the game on network television.

== Notable participants ==
Morgan State players who subsequently had NFL careers include Lanier, defensive back Bob Wade (who would come to greater fame as the basketball coach at Baltimore's Dunbar High, and as head basketball coach at the University of Maryland, the first black coach of a major sport at that school), quarterback and kicker (later, defensive back) Daryl Johnson, wide receiver Alvin Mitchell, and linebacker (later, running back) Jeff Queen. Wade also went on to be head basketball coach for the Maryland Terrapins. James Phillips played in the NFL and went on to become head football and wrestling coach at Morgan State. Lanier and head coach Earl Banks are inductees of the College Football Hall of Fame. Lanier is an inductee of the Pro Football Hall of Fame.

West Chester quarterback Jim Haynie, offensive end Don Wilkinson, and head coach Bob Mitten are inductees of their university's hall of fame.

== Scoring summary ==
Scoring summary

Quarter	Time	Drive			Team	Scoring information	Score	
Quarter	Time	Plays	Yards	TOP	Team	Scoring information	WC	MS
2	4:31	17	80		MS	Roland Savage 1-yard touchdown run, Daryl Johnson kick good	0	7
4	3:33				MS	Interception returned 11 yards for touchdown by Jeff Queen, Daryl Johnson kick good	0	14
4	0:31	13	72		WC	Don Wilkinson 11-yard touchdown reception from Jim Haynie, 2-point pass failed	6	14
"TOP" = time of possession. For other American football terms, see Glossary of American football.							6	14
