= Bob Smith (coach) =

American football, basketball, and baseball coach (1912–1994)

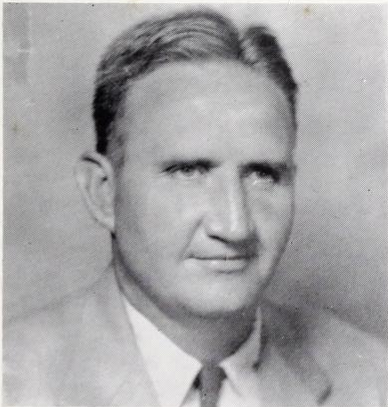

Biographical details
- Born: December 6, 1912; Cartersville, Georgia, U.S.
- Died: September 5, 1994 (aged 81); Clemson, South Carolina, U.S.

Playing career

Football
- 1930–1933: Furman

Basketball
- 1930–1934: Furman

Baseball
- 1930–1934: Furman
- Position: Halfback (football)

Coaching career (HC unless noted)

Football
- 1934: Furman (backfield)
- 1943: Jacksonville NAS (assistant)
- 1946–1947: Furman
- 1950–1969: Clemson (assistant)

Basketball
- 1935–1942: Furman

Baseball
- 1952–1957: Clemson

Head coaching record
- Overall: 4–15 (football); 57–73 (basketball); 52–65–2 (baseball)

Robert William Smith (December 6, 1912 – September 5, 1994) was an American football, basketball, and baseball coach. He served as the head football coach (1946–1947) and head men's basketball coach (1935–1942) at Furman University.

In 1950, Smith joined the Clemson Tigers football team as an assistant coach under Frank Howard. He later served was the head baseball coach from 1952 to 1957. In his role as Head Baseball Coach at Clemson University, he was named Atlantic Coast Conference Outstanding Coach of 1954.

His wife, Catherine Hampton Jordan Smith, was the first female mayor of Clemson, South Carolina.

== Head coaching record ==
=== Football ===
| Year | Team | Overall | Conference | Standing | Bowl/playoffs |
|---|---|---|---|---|---|
Furman Purple Hurricane (Southern Conference) (1946–1947)
| 1946 | Furman | 2–8 | 1–4 | T–13th | |
| 1947 | Furman | 2–7 | 1–4 | T–13th | |
| Furman: | | 4–15 | 2–8 | | |
| Total: | | 4–15 | | | |

=== Baseball ===
Record table
| Season | Team | Overall | Conference | Standing | Postseason |
|---|---|---|---|---|---|
Clemson Tigers (Southern Conference) (1952–1953)
| 1952 | Clemson | 10–12 | 10–10 | 5th (South) | |
| 1953 | Clemson | 11–6 | 11–6 | 3rd (South) | |
Clemson Tigers (Atlantic Coast Conference) (1954–1957)
| 1954 | Clemson | 14–10 | 8–4 | 1st | |
| 1955 | Clemson | 7–11 | 5–9 | 7th | |
| 1956 | Clemson | 4–14–2 | 2–10–2 | 7th | |
| 1957 | Clemson | 6–12 | 3–11 | 8th | |
| Clemson: | | 52–65–2 (.445) | 39–50–2 (.440) | | |
| Total: | | 52–65–2 (.445) | | | |
National champion Postseason invitational champion Conference regular season champion Conference regular season and conference tournament champion Division regular season champion Division regular season and conference tournament champion Conference tournament champion
