= 1947 NC State Wolfpack football team =

American college football season

1947 NC State Wolfpack football
- Conference: Southern Conference

Ranking
- AP: No. 17
- Record: 5–3–1 (3–2–1 SoCon)
- Head coach: Beattie Feathers (4th season)
- Home stadium: Riddick Stadium

1947 Southern Conference football standings
| | Conf. | | | | | Overall |
| Team | W | | L | | T | W | | L | | T |
|---|---|---|---|---|---|---|---|---|---|---|
| No. 14 William & Mary $ | 7 | – | 1 | – | 0 | 9 | – | 2 | – | 0 |
| No. 9 North Carolina | 4 | – | 1 | – | 0 | 8 | – | 2 | – | 0 |
| South Carolina | 4 | – | 1 | – | 1 | 6 | – | 2 | – | 1 |
| No. 19 Duke | 3 | – | 1 | – | 1 | 4 | – | 3 | – | 2 |
| Washington and Lee | 3 | – | 2 | – | 0 | 5 | – | 5 | – | 0 |
| Maryland | 3 | – | 2 | – | 1 | 7 | – | 2 | – | 2 |
| No. 17 NC State | 3 | – | 2 | – | 1 | 5 | – | 3 | – | 1 |
| VPI | 4 | – | 3 | – | 0 | 4 | – | 5 | – | 0 |
| Davidson | 3 | – | 3 | – | 1 | 6 | – | 3 | – | 1 |
| Wake Forest | 3 | – | 4 | – | 0 | 6 | – | 4 | – | 0 |
| VMI | 2 | – | 3 | – | 1 | 3 | – | 5 | – | 1 |
| Clemson | 1 | – | 3 | – | 0 | 4 | – | 5 | – | 0 |
| The Citadel | 1 | – | 4 | – | 0 | 3 | – | 5 | – | 0 |
| Furman | 1 | – | 4 | – | 0 | 2 | – | 7 | – | 0 |
| Richmond | 1 | – | 5 | – | 0 | 3 | – | 7 | – | 0 |
| George Washington | 0 | – | 4 | – | 0 | 1 | – | 7 | – | 1 |
$ – Conference champion; Rankings from AP Poll

The 1947 NC State Wolfpack football team was an American football team that represented North Carolina State University as a member of the Southern Conference (SoCon) during the 1947 college football season. In its fourth season under head coach Beattie Feathers, the team compiled a 5–3–1 record (3–2–1 against SoCon opponents), outscored opponents by a total of 92 to 57, and was ranked No. 17 in the final AP Poll.

NC State was ranked at No. 50 (out of 500 college football teams) in the final Litkenhous Ratings for 1947.

== Schedule ==
| Date | Opponent | Rank | Site | Result | Attendance | Source |
|---|---|---|---|---|---|---|
| September 27 | at Duke | | Duke Stadium; Durham, NC (rivalry) | L 0–7 | 38,000 | |
| October 4 | vs. Davidson | | American Legion Memorial Stadium; Charlotte, NC | W 14–0 | 15,000 | |
| October 11 | Clemson | | Riddick Stadium; Raleigh, NC (rivalry) | W 18–0 | 20,000 | |
| October 18 | Florida | No. 18 | Riddick Stadium; Raleigh, NC | L 6–7 | 18,000 | |
| November 1 | Chattanooga | | Riddick Stadium; Raleigh, NC | W 21–0 | 13,500 | |
| November 8 | at No. 18 North Carolina | | Kenan Memorial Stadium; Chapel Hill, NC (rivalry) | L 6–41 | 40,000 | |
| November 15 | Wake Forest | | Riddick Stadium; Raleigh, NC | W 20–0 | 20,000 | |
| November 22 | at No. 16 Virginia | | Scott Stadium; Charlottesville, VA | W 7–2 | 20,000 | |
| November 29 | at Maryland | | Byrd Stadium; College Park, MD | T 0–0 | 14,000 | |
Rankings from AP Poll released prior to the game

== Rankings ==
Ranking movements Legend: ██ Increase in ranking ██ Decrease in ranking — = Not ranked
| | Week | | | | | | | | | |
| Poll | 1 | 2 | 3 | 4 | 5 | 6 | 7 | 8 | 9 | Final |
|---|---|---|---|---|---|---|---|---|---|---|
| AP | — | 18 | — | — | — | — | — | — | 16 | 17 |
