= Tino Sabuco =

American football player (1926–2013)

No. 24
- Position: Center

Personal information
- Born: December 20, 1926; Detroit, Michigan, U.S.
- Died: January 1, 2013 (aged 86); Sun Lakes, Arizona, U.S.
- Listed height: 6 ft 1 in (1.85 m)
- Listed weight: 206 lb (93 kg)

Career information
- High school: Mackenzie (Detroit)
- College: San Francisco

Career history
- San Francisco 49ers (1949)
- Stats at Pro Football Reference

Valentino Sabuco (December 20, 1926 – January 1, 2013) was an American professional football center who played for the San Francisco 49ers of the All-America Football Conference (AAFC). He played college football for the Wayne Tartars and San Francisco Dons.

== Early life ==
Valentino Sabuco was born on December 20, 1926, in Detroit, Michigan. He attended Mackenzie High School in Detroit.

== College career ==
Sabuco enrolled at Wayne University to play college football for the Tartars. He lettered for the team in 1946. He transferred to the University of San Francisco, where he was a two-year letterman for the Dons from 1947 to 1948. He was inducted into the University of San Francisco's athletics hall of fame in 1972.

== Professional career ==
Sabuco was selected by the Chicago Hornets in the ninth round, with the 62nd overall pick, of the 1949 AAFC draft. However, the pick was ruled void and Sabuco joined the San Francisco 49ers. He ended up making the final roster after impressive play during the preseason. He played in ten games for the 49ers during the 1949 season as a reserve center.

== Personal life ==
Sabuco served in the United States Marine Corps. He died on January 1, 2013, in Sun Lakes, Arizona.
