= 1947 Duke Blue Devils football team =

American college football season

1947 Duke Blue Devils football
- Conference: Southern Conference

Ranking
- AP: No. 19
- Record: 4–3–2 (3–1–1 SoCon)
- Head coach: Wallace Wade (13th season)
- MVP: Fred Folger
- Captain: Ben Cittadino
- Home stadium: Duke Stadium

1947 Southern Conference football standings
	Conf.					Overall
Team	W		L		T	W		L		T
No. 14 William & Mary $	7	–	1	–	0	9	–	2	–	0
No. 9 North Carolina	4	–	1	–	0	8	–	2	–	0
South Carolina	4	–	1	–	1	6	–	2	–	1
No. 19 Duke	3	–	1	–	1	4	–	3	–	2
Washington and Lee	3	–	2	–	0	5	–	5	–	0
Maryland	3	–	2	–	1	7	–	2	–	2
No. 17 NC State	3	–	2	–	1	5	–	3	–	1
VPI	4	–	3	–	0	4	–	5	–	0
Davidson	3	–	3	–	1	6	–	3	–	1
Wake Forest	3	–	4	–	0	6	–	4	–	0
VMI	2	–	3	–	1	3	–	5	–	1
Clemson	1	–	3	–	0	4	–	5	–	0
The Citadel	1	–	4	–	0	3	–	5	–	0
Furman	1	–	4	–	0	2	–	7	–	0
Richmond	1	–	5	–	0	3	–	7	–	0
George Washington	0	–	4	–	0	1	–	7	–	1
$ – Conference champion; Rankings from AP Poll

The 1947 Duke Blue Devils football team was an American football team that represented Duke University as a member of the Southern Conference during the 1947 college football season. In its 13th season under head coach Wallace Wade, the team compiled a 4–3–2 record (3–1–1 against conference opponents), was ranked No. 19 in the final AP Poll, and outscored opponents by a total of 90 to 79.

Duke was ranked at No. 51 (out of 500 college football teams) in the final Litkenhous Ratings for 1947.

== Schedule ==
Date	Opponent	Rank	Site	Result	Attendance	Source
September 27	NC State		Duke Stadium; Durham, NC (rivalry)	W 7–0	38,000	
October 4	at Tennessee*		Shields–Watkins Field; Knoxville, TN	W 19–7	40,000	
October 11	vs. Navy*	No. 13	Memorial Stadium; Baltimore, MD	T 14–14	35,000	
October 18	Maryland	No. 17	Duke Stadium; Durham, NC	W 19–7	20,000	
October 25	at No. 11 Wake Forest	No. 15	Groves Stadium; Wake Forest, NC (rivalry)	W 13–6	25,000	
November 1	at No. 6 Georgia Tech*	No. 9	Grant Field; Atlanta, GA	L 0–7	38,000	
November 8	Missouri*^{†}	No. 13	Duke Stadium; Durham, NC	L 7–28	25,000	
November 15	South Carolina		Duke Stadium; Durham, NC	T 0–0	5,000	
November 22	No. 13 North Carolina		Duke Stadium; Durham, NC (rivalry)	L 0–21	56,000	
*Non-conference game; ^{†}Homecoming; Rankings from AP Poll released prior to the game

== Rankings ==
Ranking movements Legend: ██ Increase in ranking ██ Decrease in ranking — = Not ranked ( ) = First-place votes
	Week									
Poll	1	2	3	4	5	6	7	8	9	Final
AP	13	17	15	9 (2)	13	—	—	—	—	19
