= 1947 Washington and Lee Generals football team =

American football team

1947 Washington and Lee Generals football
- Conference: Southern Conference
- Record: 5–3 (3–2 SoCon)
- Head coach: Art Lewis (2nd season)
- Home stadium: Wilson Field

1947 Southern Conference football standings
| | Conf. | | | | | Overall |
| Team | W | | L | | T | W | | L | | T |
|---|---|---|---|---|---|---|---|---|---|---|
| No. 14 William & Mary $ | 7 | – | 1 | – | 0 | 9 | – | 2 | – | 0 |
| No. 9 North Carolina | 4 | – | 1 | – | 0 | 8 | – | 2 | – | 0 |
| South Carolina | 4 | – | 1 | – | 1 | 6 | – | 2 | – | 1 |
| No. 19 Duke | 3 | – | 1 | – | 1 | 4 | – | 3 | – | 2 |
| Washington and Lee | 3 | – | 2 | – | 0 | 5 | – | 5 | – | 0 |
| Maryland | 3 | – | 2 | – | 1 | 7 | – | 2 | – | 2 |
| No. 17 NC State | 3 | – | 2 | – | 1 | 5 | – | 3 | – | 1 |
| VPI | 4 | – | 3 | – | 0 | 4 | – | 5 | – | 0 |
| Davidson | 3 | – | 3 | – | 1 | 6 | – | 3 | – | 1 |
| Wake Forest | 3 | – | 4 | – | 0 | 6 | – | 4 | – | 0 |
| VMI | 2 | – | 3 | – | 1 | 3 | – | 5 | – | 1 |
| Clemson | 1 | – | 3 | – | 0 | 4 | – | 5 | – | 0 |
| The Citadel | 1 | – | 4 | – | 0 | 3 | – | 5 | – | 0 |
| Furman | 1 | – | 4 | – | 0 | 2 | – | 7 | – | 0 |
| Richmond | 1 | – | 5 | – | 0 | 3 | – | 7 | – | 0 |
| George Washington | 0 | – | 4 | – | 0 | 1 | – | 7 | – | 1 |
$ – Conference champion; Rankings from AP Poll

The 1947 Washington and Lee Generals football team was an American football team that represented Washington and Lee University as a member of the Southern Conference during the 1947 college football season. In its second season under head coach Art Lewis, the team compiled a 5–3 record (3–2 against conference opponents), finished in fifth place in the conference, and was outscored by a total of 226 to 140.

Washington and Lee was ranked at No. 104 (out of 500 college football teams) in the final Litkenhous Ratings for 1947.

== Schedule ==
| Date | Opponent | Site | Result | Attendance | Source |
|---|---|---|---|---|---|
| September 20 | Quantico Marines | Wilson Field; Lexington, VA | W 13–0 | 4,500 | |
| September 27 | at Richmond | City Stadium; Richmond, VA | W 16–3 | 10,000 | |
| October 4 | vs. West Virginia | Laidley Field; Charleston, WV | L 6–35 | 11,000 | |
| October 11 | George Washington | Wilson Field; Lexington, VA | W 15–6 | | |
| October 18 | at No. 16 Virginia | Scott Stadium; Charlottesville, VA | L 7–32 | 12,000 | |
| October 25 | Davidson | Richardson Stadium; Davidson, NC | W 32–0 | | |
| November 1 | at No. 10 Army | Michie Stadium; West Point, NY | L 13–65 | 21,050 | |
| November 8 | vs. VPI | Municipal Stadium; Lynchburg, VA | L 14–27 | | |
| November 15 | vs. No. 12 William & Mary | Victory Stadium; Roanoke, VA | L 6–45 | | |
| November 22 | at Delaware | Wilmington Park; Wilmington, DE | W 18–13 | | |
Rankings from AP Poll released prior to the game
