= 1947 Furman Purple Hurricane football team =

American college football season

1947 Furman Purple Hurricane football
- Conference: Southern Conference
- Record: 2–6 (1–4 SoCon)
- Head coach: Bob Smith (2nd season)
- Captain: James McQueen
- Home stadium: Sirrine Stadium

1947 Southern Conference football standings
	Conf.					Overall
Team	W		L		T	W		L		T
No. 14 William & Mary $	7	–	1	–	0	9	–	2	–	0
No. 9 North Carolina	4	–	1	–	0	8	–	2	–	0
South Carolina	4	–	1	–	1	6	–	2	–	1
No. 19 Duke	3	–	1	–	1	4	–	3	–	2
Washington and Lee	3	–	2	–	0	5	–	5	–	0
Maryland	3	–	2	–	1	7	–	2	–	2
No. 17 NC State	3	–	2	–	1	5	–	3	–	1
VPI	4	–	3	–	0	4	–	5	–	0
Davidson	3	–	3	–	1	6	–	3	–	1
Wake Forest	3	–	4	–	0	6	–	4	–	0
VMI	2	–	3	–	1	3	–	5	–	1
Clemson	1	–	3	–	0	4	–	5	–	0
The Citadel	1	–	4	–	0	3	–	5	–	0
Furman	1	–	4	–	0	2	–	7	–	0
Richmond	1	–	5	–	0	3	–	7	–	0
George Washington	0	–	4	–	0	1	–	7	–	1
$ – Conference champion; Rankings from AP Poll

The 1947 Furman Purple Hurricane football team was an American football team that represented Furman University as a member of the Southern Conference (SoCon) during the 1947 college football season. In its second and final season under head coach Bob Smith, the team compiled an overall record 2–7 with a mark of 1–4 against conference opponents, tied for 13th place in the SoCon, and was outscored by a total of 205 to 68.

In the final Litkenhous Ratings released in mid-December, Furman was ranked at No. 161 out of 500 college football teams.

The team played its home games at Sirrine Stadium in Greenville, South Carolina.

== Schedule ==
Date	Opponent	Site	Result	Attendance	Source
September 19	at Georgia*	Sanford Stadium; Athens, GA	L 7–13	17,000	
September 27	at VPI	Miles Stadium; Blacksburg, VA	L 6–20	10,000	
October 11	at South Carolina	Carolina Stadium; Columbia, SC	L 8–26	13,500	
October 17	The Citadel	Sirrine Stadium; Greenville, SC (rivalry)	W 7–0	9,000	
October 25	at Wofford*	Snyder Field; Spartanburg, SC (rivalry)	W 20–6	8,000	
November 1	at Florida*	Phillips Field; Tampa, FL	L 7–34-2	14,000	
November 8	Clemson	Sirrine Stadium; Greenville, SC	L 7–35	18,000	
November 22	at No. 10 Georgia Tech*	Grant Field; Atlanta, GA	L 0–51	20,000	
November 27	Davidson	Sirrine Stadium; Greenville, SC	L 6–20	8,000	
*Non-conference game; Rankings from AP Poll released prior to the game
