= 1943 All-Southern Conference football team =

The 1943 All-Southern Conference football team consists of American football players chosen by coaches and sports writers on behalf of the Associated Press (AP) as the best at each position from the Southern Conference during the 1943 college football season.

== All-Southern Conference selections ==
=== Backs ===
- Tom Davis, Duke (AP-1)
- Buddy Jumper, Duke (AP-1)
- Hosea Rodgers, North Carolina (AP-1)
- Nick Sacrinty, Wake Forest (AP-1)

=== Ends ===
- Ben Cittadino, Duke (AP-1)
- Ray Poole, North Carolina (AP-1)

=== Tackles ===
- John Maskas, North Carolina (AP-1)
- Pat Preston, Duke (AP-1)

=== Guards ===
- Bill Milner, Duke (AP-1)
- Jamie Myers, Duke (AP-1)

=== Centers ===
- Bill Starford, Wake Forest (AP-1)

== Key ==
AP = Associated Press

== See also ==
- 1943 College Football All-America Team
