= 1948 All-Southern Conference football team =

The 1948 All-Southern Conference football team consists of American football players chosen by the Associated Press (AP) for the All-Southern Conference football team for the 1948 college football season.

== All-Southern Conference selections ==
=== Backs ===
- Charlie Justice, North Carolina (AP-1)
- Bobby Gage, Clemson (AP-1)
- Bill Gregus, Wake Forest (AP-1)
- Jack Cloud, William & Mary (AP-1)
- Hosea Rodgers, North Carolina (AP-2)
- Bobby Thomason, VMI (AP-2)
- Andy Davis, George Washington (AP-2)
- Fred Foiger, Duke (AP-2)

=== Ends ===
- Red O'Quinn, Wake Forest (AP-1)
- Art Weiner, North Carolina (AP-1)
- Lou Hoitsma, William & Mary (AP-2)
- Jim Duncan, Duke (AP-2)

=== Tackles ===
- Len Szafaryn, North Carolina (AP-1)
- Lou Allen, Duke (AP-1)
- Al DeRogatis, Duke (AP-2)
- Ray Krouse, Maryland (AP-2)

=== Guards ===
- Frank Gillespie, Clemson (AP-1)
- Bernie Watts, North Carolina State (AP-1)
- Robert Mitten, North Carolina (AP-2)
- Charley Musser, North Carolina State (AP-2)

=== Centers ===
- Tommy Thompson, William & Mary (AP-1)
- Hal Saunders, North Carolina State (AP-2)

== Key ==
AP = Associated Press

== See also ==
- 1948 College Football All-America Team
