= 1947 Maryland Terrapins football team =

American college football season

1947 Maryland Terrapins football

Gator Bowl, T 20–20 vs. Georgia
- Conference: Southern Conference
- Record: 7–2–2 (4–2–1 SoCon)
- Head coach: Jim Tatum (1st season)
- Offensive scheme: Split-T
- Captain: George Simler
- Home stadium: Byrd Stadium (original)

1947 Southern Conference football standings
	Conf.					Overall
Team	W		L		T	W		L		T
No. 14 William & Mary $	7	–	1	–	0	9	–	2	–	0
No. 9 North Carolina	4	–	1	–	0	8	–	2	–	0
South Carolina	4	–	1	–	1	6	–	2	–	1
No. 19 Duke	3	–	1	–	1	4	–	3	–	2
Washington and Lee	3	–	2	–	0	5	–	5	–	0
Maryland	3	–	2	–	1	7	–	2	–	2
No. 17 NC State	3	–	2	–	1	5	–	3	–	1
VPI	4	–	3	–	0	4	–	5	–	0
Davidson	3	–	3	–	1	6	–	3	–	1
Wake Forest	3	–	4	–	0	6	–	4	–	0
VMI	2	–	3	–	1	3	–	5	–	1
Clemson	1	–	3	–	0	4	–	5	–	0
The Citadel	1	–	4	–	0	3	–	5	–	0
Furman	1	–	4	–	0	2	–	7	–	0
Richmond	1	–	5	–	0	3	–	7	–	0
George Washington	0	–	4	–	0	1	–	7	–	1
$ – Conference champion; Rankings from AP Poll

The 1947 Maryland Terrapins football team represented the University of Maryland in 1947 college football season as a member of the Southern Conference (SoCon).

Jim Tatum served as the first-year head coach and replaced Clark Shaughnessy who had been asked to resign. Tatum replaced Shaughnessy's pass-oriented version of the T formation with the option-heavy split-T offense. During his nine-year tenure at College Park, Tatum would become the winningest coach in school history. In 1947, he got off to a good start and significantly improved from Shaughnessy's 3–6 record of the season prior.

The highlight of the season was a berth in the 1948 Gator Bowl, the first postseason game in school history. NCAA-scoring leader Lu Gambino ran for 165 yards and scored all three touchdowns for Maryland. The game ultimately ended in a stalemate.

Maryland was ranked at No. 45 (out of 500 college football teams) in the final Litkenhous Ratings for 1947.

== Schedule ==
Date	Opponent	Site	Result	Attendance	Source
September 27	at South Carolina	Williams–Brice Stadium; Columbia, SC	W 19–13	13,000	
October 3	Delaware*	Byrd Stadium; College Park, MD	W 43–19	16,460	
October 10	Richmond	Byrd Stadium; College Park, MD	W 18–6		
October 18	at No. 17 Duke	Wallace Wade Stadium; Durham, NC	L 7–19	20,000	
October 25	at VPI	Miles Stadium; Blacksburg, VA	W 21–19	12,500	
November 1	West Virginia*^{†}	Byrd Stadium; College Park, MD (rivalry)	W 27–0	16,500	
November 8	at Duquesne	Pitt Stadium; Pittsburgh, PA	W 32–0		
November 15	vs. No. 19 North Carolina	Griffith Stadium; Washington, DC	L 0–19	22,000	
November 22	at Vanderbilt*	Dudley Field; Nashville, TN	W 20–6	20,000	
November 29	NC State	Byrd Stadium; College Park, MD	T 0–0	14,000	
January 1	Georgia*	Gator Bowl; Jacksonville, FL (1948 Gator Bowl)	T 20–20	21,000	
*Non-conference game; ^{†}Homecoming; Rankings from Coaches' Poll released prior to the game

== Game summaries ==
=== South Carolina ===
Gambino scored three touchdowns and Maryland firmly held the momentum for the first three quarters. In the final period, South Carolina mounted a comeback attempt. Maryland player Gene Kinney intercepted a pass on the Terrapin 31-yard line to secure the victory, 19–13.

=== Delaware ===
Delaware entered the game atop a 32-game winning streak. Gambino again scored three touchdowns, with others added by Davis, Idzik, and Targarona. The Blue Hens responded to an 88-yard touchdown run by Gambino with a 90-yard score by Cole.

=== Richmond ===
Maryland avenged the previous season's loss to Richmond. Gambino scored twice and completed a pass to Simler for the third touchdown.

=== Duke (#17) ===
Maryland fumbles and interceptions helped Duke snap the three-game winning streak. Vernon Seibert scored the Terrapins' only score of the day. It was also the first touchdown ever scored by Maryland against Duke.

=== VPI ===
VPI scored twice in the first quarter after Maryland penalties and a turnover. In the fourth quarter, Maryland mounted a two-touchdown rally to spoil VPI's homecoming, 21–19. The decisive scores were due to a long Vic Turyn pass to Simler and a 32-yard dash by Idzik. McHugh made all three point after touchdown kicks, which proved to be the margin of victory.

=== Georgia (Gator Bowl) ===
	1	2	3	4	Total
Maryland	0	7	13	0	20
Georgia	0	0	7	13	20

== Personnel ==
=== Roster ===
The Maryland roster for the 1947 season consisted of the following players:

- Pete Augsburger
- John Baroni
- Sam Behr
- Harry Bonk
- James Brasher
- Paul Broglio
- Fred Davis
- Joseph Drach
- Francis Evans
- William Everson
- Lu Gambino
- Rudolph Gayzur
- Chester Gierula
- Jim Goodman
- John Idzik
- Eugene Kinney
- Ray Krouse
- Joe Kuchta
- Jim LaRue
- Stanford Lavine
- Thomas McHugh
- Thomas McQuade
- James Molster
- Al Phillips
- Ed Pobiak
- Wilbur Rock
- Earl Roth
- Jake Rowden
- Edward Schwarz
- Vernon Seibert
- George Simler
- Bernie Sniscak
- Jack Targanrona
- John Troha
- Robert Troll
- Joe Tucker
- Vic Turyn
- Hubert Werner
- Elmer Wingate

=== Coaching staff ===
- Jim Tatum, head coach
- George Barclay, assistant coach
- Flucie Stewart, assistant coach
- Jim Meade, assistant coach
- Houston Elder, assistant coach
- Albert Woods, assistant coach
- Bill Meek, assistant coach
- Duke Wyre, trainer

== Awards ==
Lu Gambino was selected as a first-team All-Southern Conference back. Gambino and Eugene Kinney were named honorable mention All-Americans.

== See also ==
- Maryland Terrapins football under Jim Tatum
