= 1947 VMI Keydets football team =

American college football season

1947 VMI Keydets football
- Conference: Southern Conference
- Record: 3–5–1 (2–3–1 SoCon)
- Head coach: Arthur Morton (1st season)
- Home stadium: Alumni Field

1947 Southern Conference football standings
	Conf.					Overall
Team	W		L		T	W		L		T
No. 14 William & Mary $	7	–	1	–	0	9	–	2	–	0
No. 9 North Carolina	4	–	1	–	0	8	–	2	–	0
South Carolina	4	–	1	–	1	6	–	2	–	1
No. 19 Duke	3	–	1	–	1	4	–	3	–	2
Washington and Lee	3	–	2	–	0	5	–	5	–	0
Maryland	3	–	2	–	1	7	–	2	–	2
No. 17 NC State	3	–	2	–	1	5	–	3	–	1
VPI	4	–	3	–	0	4	–	5	–	0
Davidson	3	–	3	–	1	6	–	3	–	1
Wake Forest	3	–	4	–	0	6	–	4	–	0
VMI	2	–	3	–	1	3	–	5	–	1
Clemson	1	–	3	–	0	4	–	5	–	0
The Citadel	1	–	4	–	0	3	–	5	–	0
Furman	1	–	4	–	0	2	–	7	–	0
Richmond	1	–	5	–	0	3	–	7	–	0
George Washington	0	–	4	–	0	1	–	7	–	1
$ – Conference champion; Rankings from AP Poll

The 1947 VMI Keydets football team was an American football team that represented the Virginia Military Institute (VMI) as a member of the Southern Conference during the 1947 college football season. In its first season under head coach Arthur Morton, the team compiled a 3–5–1 record (2–3–1 against conference opponents), finished in 11th place in the conference, and was outscored by a total of 152 to 120.

VMI was ranked at No. 98 (out of 500 college football teams) in the final Litkenhous Ratings for 1947.

The team played its home games at Alumni Field in Lexington, Virginia.

== Schedule ==
Date	Opponent	Site	Result	Attendance	Source
September 27	Catawba*	Alumni Field; Lexington, VA	W 13–6	4,000	
October 4	George Washington	Alumni Field; Lexington, VA	W 13–7		
October 11	at No. 4 Georgia Tech*	Grant Field; Atlanta, GA	L 0–20	25,000	
October 18	at Richmond	City Stadium; Richmond, VA	L 20–21	8,000	
October 25	No. 13 Virginia^{†}	Wilson Field; Lexington, VA	L 6–35	12,000	
November 1	at Davidson	Richardson Stadium; Davidson, NC	T 14–14		
November 8	at No. 15 William & Mary	Cary Field; Williamsburg, VA (rivalry)	L 20–28	8,000	
November 15	at The Citadel	Johnson Hagood Stadium; Charleston, SC (rivalry)	L 6–7	6,700	
November 27	vs. Virginia Tech	Victory Stadium; Roanoke, VA (rivalry)	W 28–14	29,000	
*Non-conference game; ^{†}Homecoming; Rankings from AP Poll released prior to the game
