= 1947 VPI Gobblers football team =

American college football season

1947 VPI Gobblers football
- Conference: Southern Conference
- Record: 4–5 (4–3 SoCon)
- Head coach: Jimmy Kitts (3rd season)
- Captains: Billy Shelby Barbour; Bobby Smith
- Home stadium: Miles Stadium

1947 Southern Conference football standings
	Conf.					Overall
Team	W		L		T	W		L		T
No. 14 William & Mary $	7	–	1	–	0	9	–	2	–	0
No. 9 North Carolina	4	–	1	–	0	8	–	2	–	0
South Carolina	4	–	1	–	1	6	–	2	–	1
No. 19 Duke	3	–	1	–	1	4	–	3	–	2
Washington and Lee	3	–	2	–	0	5	–	5	–	0
Maryland	3	–	2	–	1	7	–	2	–	2
No. 17 NC State	3	–	2	–	1	5	–	3	–	1
VPI	4	–	3	–	0	4	–	5	–	0
Davidson	3	–	3	–	1	6	–	3	–	1
Wake Forest	3	–	4	–	0	6	–	4	–	0
VMI	2	–	3	–	1	3	–	5	–	1
Clemson	1	–	3	–	0	4	–	5	–	0
The Citadel	1	–	4	–	0	3	–	5	–	0
Furman	1	–	4	–	0	2	–	7	–	0
Richmond	1	–	5	–	0	3	–	7	–	0
George Washington	0	–	4	–	0	1	–	7	–	1
$ – Conference champion; Rankings from AP Poll

The 1947 VPI Gobblers football team was an American football that represented Virginia Polytechnic Institute in the Southern Conference during the 1947 college football season. In its third season under head coach Jimmy Kitts, the team compiled a 4–5 record (4–3 against conference opponents), finished eighth in the Southern Conference, and as outscored by a total of 191 to 162.

VPI was ranked at No. 88 (out of 500 college football teams) in the final Litkenhous Ratings for 1947.

The team played its home games at Miles Stadium in Blacksburg, Virginia.

== Schedule ==
Date	Time	Opponent	Site	Result	Attendance	Source
September 27		Furman	Miles Stadium; Blacksburg, VA	W 20–6	10,000	
October 4		vs. Virginia*	Victory Stadium; Roanoke, VA (rivalry)	L 7–41	22,000	
October 11		vs. William & Mary	City Stadium; Richmond, VA	L 7–21	10,000	
October 18		at No. 7 Army*	Michie Stadium; West Point, NY	L 0–40	20,000	
October 25		Maryland^{†}	Miles Stadium; Blacksburg, VA	L 19–21	12,500	
October 31	8:00 p.m.	at George Washington	Griffith Stadium; Washington, DC	W 42–6	5,000	
November 8		vs. Washington and Lee	Municipal Stadium; Lynchburg, VA	W 27–14	12,500	
November 15		Richmond	Miles Stadium; Blacksburg, VA	W 26–14	5,500	
November 27		vs. VMI	Victory Stadium; Roanoke, VA (rivalry)	L 14–28	29,000–33,000	
*Non-conference game; ^{†}Homecoming; Rankings from AP Poll released prior to the game

== 1948 NFL draftees ==
One VPI player was selected in the 1948 NFL draft, as follows:

Year	Round	Pick	Overall	Name	Team	Position
1951	28	10	337	Sterling Wingo	Los Angeles Rams	Back

== Roster ==
The following players were members of the 1947 football team according to the roster published in the 1948 edition of The Bugle, the Virginia Tech yearbook.

VPI 1947 roster
Jim Adams; Victor Anderson; Frank H. Ballard; Billy Shelby Barbour (Capt.); William Ernest Baucom; Ralph Coe Beard; Raymond Rucker Beasley; Floyd Samuel Bowles; Robert LeRoy Browder; Maynard Leon David Bruce; Thomas Craig Burns; Donald Butkovsky; Coy Lenard Chambers; Joseph Litton Church; Pete "Chip" Collum; Jack Cooke; Mervin K. Cox; Billy Patrick DeNardo; Richard T. DeShazo; William Donovan; Hubert Wallace Dutton	Bruce Mills "Bud" Fisher; Charles Mugler Forbes; Robert Fracker; Nelson Fuller; John E. "Jack" Gallagher; William Hughes Hegamyer; Robert Hess; Joseph William Hoffmann Jr.; Oren Edward Hopkins; Jack Ross Ittner; Cary Kenyon Johnson; Robert Edward Johnson; Ted James Johnson; Howard Jones; Jimmy Kitts; John Harry Kroehling; Anthony Thomas Kujawa; Carl Leonard; John James Maskas; J. Cordell McCraw; Augustus Paul Mengulas; Hamilton Otey Meriwether	Ronald Garland Miller; Elmo Natali; Ross Moore Orr; Horace Lee Pearce; Erving Hascall Rand; Frank Ransome; Bernard Sizemore; Bobby Smith (Capt.); G. L. "Pete" Smith; Warren William Squires; John Robert Stortz; Bob Taylor; Franklin Ray Taylor; David Lacy Thomas; W. Harry Walton; Robert Franklin Webb; Richard White; Donald Lindbergh Whiteman; William Elmer Wilson; Sterling Lagrand Wingo; Gerhard Charles Zekert; Paul Ethan "Zig" Zender
