= Bobby Thomason =

American football player (1928–2013)

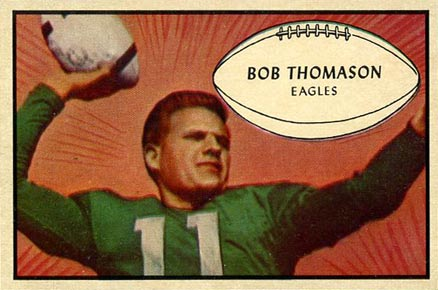
- Thomason on a 1953 Bowman football card

No. 47, 32, 28, 11
- Position: Quarterback

Personal information
- Born: March 26, 1928; Albertville, Alabama, U.S.
- Died: November 5, 2013 (aged 85); Charlotte, North Carolina, U.S.
- Listed height: 6 ft 1 in (1.85 m)
- Listed weight: 196 lb (89 kg)

Career information
- High school: Leeds (Leeds, Alabama)
- College: VMI
- NFL draft: 1949: 1st round, 7th overall pick

Career history
- Los Angeles Rams (1949); Richmond Rebels (1950); Green Bay Packers (1951); Philadelphia Eagles (1952–1957)

Awards and highlights
- Second-team All-Pro (1953); 3× Pro Bowl (1953, 1955, 1956); NFL completion percentage leader (1951); NFL passing touchdowns leader (1953); 3× Second-team All-SoCon (1945, 1946, 1948)

Career NFL statistics
- Passing attempts: 1,346
- Passing completions: 687
- Completion percentage: 51.0%
- TD–INT: 68–90
- Passing yards: 9,480
- Passer rating: 62.9
- Stats at Pro Football Reference

Robert Lee Thomason (March 26, 1928 – November 5, 2013) was an American professional football player who was a quarterback in the National Football League (NFL) from 1949 to 1957, primarily for the Philadelphia Eagles. He was selected to three Pro Bowls. He played college football for the VMI Keydets

== Early life ==
Thomason was born in 1928 at Albertville, Alabama. He attended Leeds High School in Alabama. He then played college football at Virginia Military Institute (VMI) from 1945 to 1948. In 1948, he completed 95 of 117 passes (81.2%) for 1,242 yards and 14 touchdowns. He was selected by the Associated Press as the Virginia "athlete of the year" for 1948. He also received first-team honors from the United Press on the 1948 All-Southern Conference football team.

== Professional football ==
Thomason was selected by the Los Angeles Rams in the first round, seventh overall pick, of the 1949 NFL draft. He appeared in six games for the Rams, all as a backup to Bob Waterfield, in 1949. In 1950 season, he jumped to the American Football League, playing for the Richmond Rebels. In July 1951, the Rams traded their rights to Thomason to the Green Bay Packers. Thomason appeared in 11 games, one as a starter, for the Packers in 1951. He returned to the Rams at the end of the 1951 season, but was traded to the Philadelphia Eagles in January 1952. He played for the Eagles from 1952 to 1957.

From 1951 to 1956, he was one of the leading passers in the NFL. He was selected to the Pro Bowl in 1953, 1954, and 1956. In 1951, he completed 125 of 221 passes for 1,306 yards and 11 touchdowns and led the league with a 56.6% completion percentage. In both 1951 and 1952, he had the lowest interception percentage in the NFL. In 1953, he completed 162 of 304 passes (53.3%), led the NFL with 21 touchdown passes, and ranked second in the league with 2,462 passing yards (205.2 yards per game). On November 8, 1953, he set an Eagles single-game record with 437 passing yards and four touchdowns in a victory over the New York Giants. In 1955, he ranked second in the NFL with a 122 passer rating.

== NFL career statistics ==
Legend
	Led the league
**Bold**	Career high

Year	Team	Games			Passing									Rushing				
Year	Team	GP	GS	Record	Cmp	Att	Pct	Yds	Y/A	Lng	TD	Int	Rtg	Att	Yds	Avg	Lng	TD
1949	RAM	6	0	0-0	6	12	50.0	50	4.2	15	0	1	26.4	0	0	0.0	0	0
1951	GNB	11	1	0-1	125	221	**56.6**	1,306	5.9	**75**	11	9	73.5	5	-5	-1.0	10	0
1952	PHI	12	9	5-4	95	212	44.8	1,334	6.3	44	8	9	60.5	17	**88**	**5.2**	**23**	0
1953	PHI	12	8	**6-2**	**162**	**304**	53.3	**2,462**	**8.1**	62	**21**	20	75.8	9	23	2.6	20	1
1954	PHI	10	4	2-2	83	170	48.8	1,242	7.3	63	10	13	61.0	10	45	4.5	19	0
1955	PHI	10	4	1-2-1	88	171	51.5	1,337	7.8	-	10	7	**80.0**	17	29	1.7	20	0
1956	PHI	12	10	3-6-1	82	164	50.0	1,119	6.8	52	4	**21**	40.7	**21**	48	2.3	19	2
1957	PHI	12	8	1-7	46	92	50.0	630	6.8	67	4	10	47.2	15	62	4.1	19	**3**
Career		85	44	18-24-2	687	1,346	51.0	9,480	7.0	75	68	90	62.9	94	290	3.1	23	6

== Family and later years ==
Thomason married Jean Pierce in 1951. They had one daughter. In 2013, Thomason died of heart failure at the age of 85 in Charlotte, North Carolina.
