= Wilbur Volz =

American football player (1924–2015)

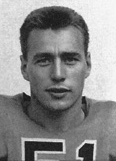
- Volz pictured in The Savitar 1947, Missouri yearbook

Profile
- Position: Halfback/defensive back

Personal information
- Born: January 1, 1924; Edwardsville, Illinois, U.S.
- Died: December 27, 2015 (aged 91); Scottsdale, Arizona, U.S.
- Listed height: 6 ft 0 in (1.83 m)
- Listed weight: 192 lb (87 kg)

Career information
- High school: Edwardsville (IL)
- College: Missouri

Career history
- Buffalo Bills (1949)
- Stats at Pro Football Reference

Wilbur Edward Volz (January 1, 1924 – December 27, 2015) was an American football halfback who played one season with the Buffalo Bills. He played college football at the University of Missouri, having previously attended Edwardsville High School in Edwardsville, Illinois. Volz died in Scottsdale, Arizona in 2015.
