= Robert Mitten (American football) =

American football player and coach (1928–1972)

Biographical details
- Born: August 9, 1928; Shippensburg, Pennsylvania, U.S.
- Died: April 21, 1972; West Chester, Pennsylvania, U.S.

Playing career
- 1945–1948: North Carolina
- Position: Guard

Coaching career (HC unless noted)
- 1951–1952: Hickory HS (NC)
- 1953–1964: West Chester (assistant)
- 1965–1971: West Chester

Head coaching record
- Overall: 52–15 (college)
- Bowls: 0–2

Accomplishments and honors

Championships
- 3 PSCAC/PSAC (1967, 1969, 1971); 5 PSCAC/PSAC East Division (1966–1967, 1969–1971)

Awards
- Second-team All-SoCon (1948)

Robert M. Mitten (August 9, 1928 – April 21, 1972) was an American football player and coach. He served as the head football coach at West Chester University from 1965 to 1971. Mitten played college football at the University of North Carolina–Chapel Hill from 1945 to 1948. He was selected 189th overall in the 19th round by the Chicago Bears in the 1949 NFL draft.

== Head coaching record ==
=== College ===
Year	Team	Overall	Conference	Standing	Bowl/playoffs	UPI^{#}
West Chester Golden Rams (Pennsylvania State College Athletic Conference / Pennsylvania State Athletic Conference) (1965–1971)
1965	West Chester	5–3	5–1	2nd (East)		
1966	West Chester	8–3	6–0	1st (East)	L Tangerine	
1967	West Chester	10–1	6–0	1st (East)	L Tangerine	5
1968	West Chester	6–3	5–1	2nd (East)		
1969	West Chester	8–2	5–0	1st (East)		
1970	West Chester	7–4	5–0	1st (East)		
1971	West Chester	9–1	5–1	1st (East)		
West Chester:		52–15	37–3			
Total:		52–15				
National championship Conference title Conference division title or championship game berth
^{#}Rankings from final UPI small college poll.
