= Jack Cloud =

American football player and coach (1925–2010)

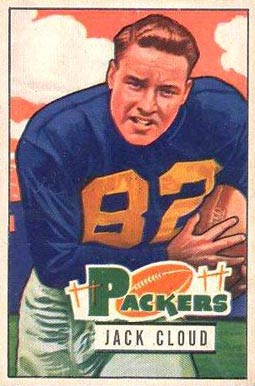
- Cloud on a 1951 Bowman football card

No. 50, 82, 34
- Positions: Linebacker, fullback

Personal information
- Born: January 1, 1925; Britton, Oklahoma, U.S.
- Died: June 19, 2010 (aged 85); Annapolis, Maryland, U.S.
- Listed height: 5 ft 10 in (1.78 m)
- Listed weight: 220 lb (100 kg)

Career information
- High school: Maury (Norfolk, Virginia)
- College: William & Mary
- NFL draft: 1950: 6th round, 69th overall pick

Career history
- Green Bay Packers (1950–1951); Washington Redskins (1952–1953)

Awards and highlights
- First-team All-American (1948); Third-team All-American (1947); 3× First-team All-SoCon (1946, 1947, 1948); Second-team All-SoCon (1949)

Career NFL statistics
- Rushing yards: 141
- Rushing average: 2.5
- Interceptions: 2
- Total touchdowns: 6
- Stats at Pro Football Reference
- College Football Hall of Fame

Jack Martin Cloud (January 1, 1925 – June 19, 2010) was an American professional football linebacker and fullback in the National Football League (NFL) for the Green Bay Packers and the Washington Redskins. He was inducted into the Virginia Sports Hall of Fame in 1984 and the College Football Hall of Fame in 1990.

== Early life ==
Cloud attended and played high school football at Matthew Fontaine Maury High School in Norfolk, Virginia. After graduation, he served three years in the United States Air Force before college.

== College career ==
Cloud attended and played college football at the College of William & Mary, where he scored five touchdowns in one game and set a school scoring record of 102 points in 1947.

== Professional career ==
Cloud was drafted in the sixth round of the 1950 NFL draft by the Green Bay Packers (1950–1951). He later played for the Washington Redskins (1952–1953).

== Coaching and the Navy ==
After retiring from the NFL, Cloud became an assistant coach at William & Mary in 1954. The following year, he became the athletic director and head coach at Naval Station Norfolk (1955–1958). He then joined the staff at the United States Naval Academy, where he had a 22-year career as lightweight coach and assistant varsity coach. After retiring from coaching, Cloud was an associate professor of physical education and special assistant to the director of athletics. He retired in 1990.
