= Knox Ramsey =

American football player (1926–2005)

No. 32, 70, 62, 68
- Position: Guard

Personal information
- Born: February 13, 1926; Speed, Indiana, U.S.
- Died: March 19, 2005 (aged 79); Richmond, Virginia, U.S.
- Listed height: 6 ft 1 in (1.85 m)
- Listed weight: 216 lb (98 kg)

Career information
- High school: Maryville (TN)
- College: William & Mary (1944-1947)
- NFL draft: 1948: 5th round, 32nd overall pick

Career history
- Los Angeles Dons (1948-1949); Chicago Cardinals (1950–1951); Philadelphia Eagles (1952); Washington Redskins (1952–1953)

Awards and highlights
- Second-team All-American (1947); Third-team All-American (1946); 3× First-team All-SoCon (1945, 1946, 1947)

Career NFL/AAFC statistics
- Games played: 69
- Games started: 47
- Fumble recoveries: 1
- Stats at Pro Football Reference

Knox Wagner "Bulldog" Ramsey (February 13, 1926 – March 19, 2005) was an American football offensive lineman in the National Football League (NFL) for the Chicago Cardinals, the Philadelphia Eagles, and the Washington Redskins. Ramsey also played in the All-America Football Conference (AAFC) for the Los Angeles Dons. When the All-America Football Conference dissolved in 1950, the NFL an AAFC dispersal draft to assign players from the Buffalo Bills, Chicago Hornets and Los Angeles Dons. Ramsey was drafted (1st Round) by the San Francisco 49ers as the 10th overall pick and traded to the Chicago Cardinals.

Knox Ramsey played college football at the College of William & Mary where he was selected for three consecutive years to Virginia's all-state teams and the Southern Conference teams. He also was named to the all-time state of Virginia team and the all-time William & Mary football team. Ramsey received second-team All-American honors in 1947 when he was selected by the Associated Press. He played in the 1948 College All-Star Game against the NFL Champions Chicago Cardinals where he faced his brother Buster Ramsey. Ramsey was drafted in the fifth round of the 1948 NFL draft (32nd pick overall) by the Chicago Bears and in the ninth round (37th pick overall) of the 1948 AAFC Draft by the Los Angeles Dons. Following his professional football career Ramsey was inducted into the William & Mary Hall of Fame and the Blount County (TN) Sports Hall of Fame.

== Personal life ==
Ramsey's son, Knox Wagner Ramsey Jr., was a football player for Virginia, while his granddaughter Alyssa Ramsey was a soccer player who appeared for the United States women's national team.
