= Sid Varney =

American football coach (1927–2011)

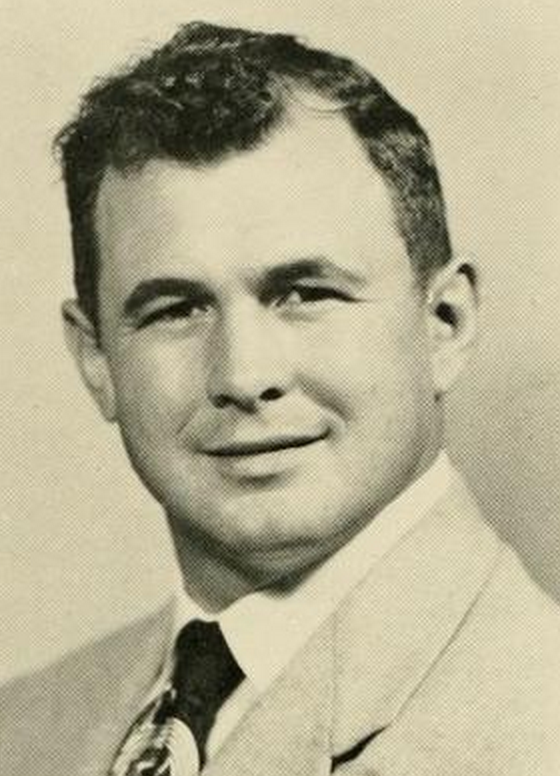
- Varney pictured in Phi Psi Cli 1954, Elon yearbook

Biographical details
- Born: December 22, 1927; Powell, Pennsylvania, U.S.
- Died: November 25, 2011 (aged 83); Columbia, South Carolina, U.S.

Playing career

Football
- 1945–1948: North Carolina

Baseball
- 1947–1949: North Carolina
- 1949: Greenville Greenies
- 1952: Raleigh Capitals
- 1952: Wilson Tobs
- 1955: Greensboro Patriots
- Positions: Guard (football); Catcher (baseball)

Coaching career (HC unless noted)

Football
- 1950–1952: Presbyterian (assistant)
- 1953–1959: Elon

Baseball
- 1951–1953: Presbyterian

Head coaching record
- Overall: 24–36–2 (football)

Harry Eugene "Sid" Varney (December 22, 1927 – November 25, 2011) was an American football and baseball coach. He served as the head football coach at Elon University from 1953 until 1959, compiling a record of 24–36–2.

Varney began his coaching career in 1950 when he was hired as head baseball coach and assistant football coach at Presbyterian College in Clinton, South Carolina. After leading Elon to records of 3–6 in 1958 and 1–9 in 1690, Varney's contract as football coach was not renewed in 1960.

Varney died on November 25, 2011, in Columbia, South Carolina.

== Head coaching record ==
=== Football ===
| Year | Team | Overall | Conference | Standing | Bowl/playoffs |
|---|---|---|---|---|---|
Elon Fightin' Christians (North State Conference) (1953–1959)
| 1953 | Elon | 1–6–1 | 1–4–1 | 6th | |
| 1954 | Elon | 5–3–1 | 4–1–1 | 2nd | |
| 1955 | Elon | 3–7 | 2–4 | 5th | |
| 1956 | Elon | 5–5 | 4–2 | T–2nd | |
| 1957 | Elon | 6–0 | 4–0 | 2nd | |
| 1958 | Elon | 3–6 | 2–4 | 5th | |
| 1959 | Elon | 1–9 | 0–6 | 7th | |
| Elon: | | 24–36–2 | 17–21–2 | | |
| Total: | | 24–36–2 | | | |
