= Frank LoVuolo =

American football player (1924–2018)

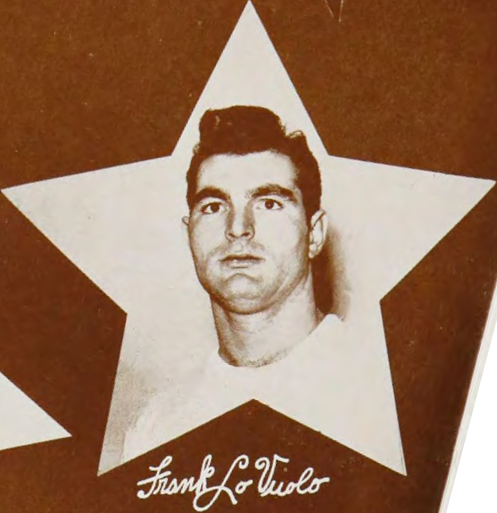
- LoVuolo c. 1948

No. 89
- Position: End

Personal information
- Born: May 1, 1924; Binghamton, New York, U.S.
- Died: December 17, 2018 (aged 94); Binghamton, New York, U.S.
- Listed height: 6 ft 2 in (1.88 m)
- Listed weight: 210 lb (95 kg)

Career information
- High school: North (Binghamton)
- College: St. Bonaventure (1946–1948)
- NFL draft: 1949: 7th round, 66th overall pick

Career history
- New York Giants (1949)

Awards and highlights
- First-team Little All-American (1948); Second-team All-Eastern (1948)

Career NFL statistics
- Receptions: 2
- Receiving yards: 37
- Stats at Pro Football Reference

Frank Anthony LoVuolo (May 1, 1924 – December 17, 2018) was an American professional football end who played one season for the New York Giants. He played college football at the St. Bonaventure University, having previously attended North High School in his hometown of Binghamton. He died in December 2018 at the age of 94.
