= Art Weiner =

American football player (1926–2013)

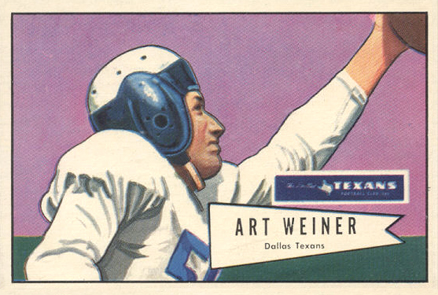
- Weiner on a 1952 Bowman football card

No. 66
- Position: End

Personal information
- Born: August 16, 1926; Newark, New Jersey, U.S.
- Died: December 25, 2013 (aged 87); Greensboro, North Carolina, U.S.
- Listed height: 6 ft 3 in (1.91 m)
- Listed weight: 212 lb (96 kg)

Career information
- High school: Westside (Newark)
- College: North Carolina (1946–1949)
- NFL draft: 1950: 2nd round, 16th overall pick

Career history
- New York Yanks (1950)

Awards and highlights
- 2× First-team All-American (1948, 1949); 3× First-team All-SoCon (1947, 1948, 1949); Second-team All-SoCon (1946); North Carolina Tar Heels No. 50 retired

Career NFL statistics
- Receptions: 35
- Receiving yards: 722
- Receiving touchdowns: 6
- Stats at Pro Football Reference
- College Football Hall of Fame

Art Weiner (August 16, 1926 – December 25, 2013) was an American professional football end who played one season in the National Football League (NFL) for the New York Yanks. He played college football for the North Carolina Tar Heels from 1946 to 1949.

Weiner matched the (at the time) NCAA record when he amassed 52 receptions in 1949. He averaged 16 yards per reception for career. He played alongside Choo Choo Justice in what became known as the Justice–Weiner era while leading UNC to three major bowls. He was inducted into the North Carolina Sports Hall of Fame in 1973 and later into the College Football Hall of Fame in 1992. After his football career ended, he worked as an executive at Burlington Industries and later owned a travel business.

Weiner spent most of his adult life in Greensboro, North Carolina, with his wife, Marion "Boots" Weiner. They had 3 children, 8 grandchildren and 1 great-granddaughter. Weiner died on December 25, 2013, with his family by his side.

== See also ==
- List of NCAA major college football yearly receiving leaders
