= Lou Kusserow =

American gridiron football player (1927–2001)

No. 81, 56, 88
- Positions: Linebacker, fullback

Personal information
- Born: September 6, 1927; Braddock, Pennsylvania, U.S.
- Died: June 30, 2001 (aged 73); Rancho Mirage, California, U.S.
- Listed height: 6 ft 1 in (1.85 m)
- Listed weight: 200 lb (91 kg)

Career information
- College: Columbia (1945–1948)
- NFL draft: 1949: 3rd round, 22nd overall pick

Career history
- New York Yankees (1949); New York Yanks (1950); Hamilton Tiger-Cats (1953-1956)

Awards and highlights
- Grey Cup champion (1953); 2× First-team All-Eastern (1945, 1948); Second-team All-Eastern (1946)

Career NFL/AAFC statistics
- Rushing yards: 142
- Rushing average: 3.6
- Return yards: 136
- Stats at Pro Football Reference

Louis Joseph Kusserow (September 6, 1927 – June 30, 2001) was an American and Canadian football player who played for the Hamilton Tiger-Cats. He won the Grey Cup with them in 1953. Kusserow attended and played football at Columbia University. He was drafted in the 1949 NFL draft by the Detroit Lions in Round 3, #22 overall. In 1949, he played in the All-America Football Conference for the New York Yankees. The following year, he played in the National Football League for the New York Yanks. After his football career, he worked with NBC as an executive. In 1957, he appeared in an episode of To Tell the Truth as a decoy for baseball player Bobby Brown (third baseman). He was inducted into the Columbia University Hall of Fame in 2006. In 2001, Kusserow died of prostate cancer.
