= Lou Allen =

American football player (1924–2008)

No. 65, 73, 62
- Position: Offensive tackle

Personal information
- Born: July 12, 1924; Gadsden, Alabama, U.S.
- Died: April 16, 2008 (aged 83); Greensboro, North Carolina, U.S.
- Listed height: 6 ft 3 in (1.91 m)
- Listed weight: 220 lb (100 kg)

Career information
- High school: Greensboro
- College: Duke (1946–1949)
- NFL draft: 1950: 5th round, 60th overall pick

Career history
- Pittsburgh Steelers (1950–1951); Montreal Alouettes (1952)

Awards and highlights
- Third-team All-American (1949); 2× First-team All-SoCon (1948, 1949)

Career NFL statistics
- Games played: 24
- Games started: 24
- Fumble recoveries: 1
- Stats at Pro Football Reference

Louis Eugene Allen (July 12, 1924 – April 16, 2008) was an American professional football player who was an offensive lineman in the National Football League (NFL) and the Canadian Football League (CFL). He played college football for the Duke Blue Devils. In the early 1950s, Allen played for the Pittsburgh Steelers of the NFL and the Montreal Alouettes of the CFL. He played only one game with the Alouettes in the 1952 CFL season.
