= Tom Cochran (American football) =

American football player (1924–2010)

No. 26
- Position: Fullback

Personal information
- Born: April 13, 1924; Birmingham, Alabama, US
- Died: January 19, 2010 (aged 85); Ft. Walton Beach, Florida, US

Career information
- College: Auburn

Career history
- 1949: Washington Redskins
- Stats at Pro Football Reference

Thomas Leon Cochran (April 13, 1924 – January 19, 2010) was an American professional football fullback in the National Football League for the Washington Redskins. Born in Birmingham, Alabama, he played college football at Auburn University. He died in Ft. Walton Beach, Florida in January 2010.
