= Len Szafaryn =

American football player (1928–1990)

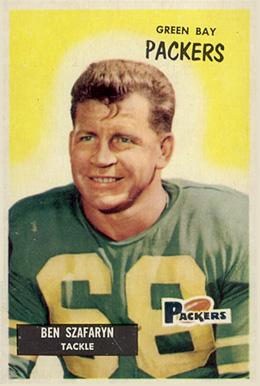
- Szafaryn on a 1955 Bowman football card

No. 43, 51, 68, 76, 74
- Positions: Offensive lineman, defensive tackle, linebacker

Personal information
- Born: January 19, 1928; Ambridge, Pennsylvania, U.S.
- Died: September 22, 1990 (aged 62); Baden, Pennsylvania, U.S.
- Listed height: 6 ft 2 in (1.88 m)
- Listed weight: 226 lb (103 kg)

Career information
- College: North Carolina
- NFL draft: 1949: 3rd round, 28th overall pick

Career history
- Washington Redskins (1949); Green Bay Packers (1950, 1953–1956); Philadelphia Eagles (1957–1958)

Awards and highlights
- Second-team All-American (1948); First-team All-SoCon (1948)

Career NFL statistics
- Games played: 75
- Games started: 48
- Fumble recoveries: 4
- Touchdowns: 1
- Stats at Pro Football Reference

Leonard Adolph Szafaryn (January 19, 1928 – September 22, 1990) was an American professional football offensive lineman in the National Football League (NFL) for the Washington Redskins, Green Bay Packers, and the Philadelphia Eagles. He played college football at the University of North Carolina and was drafted in the third round of the 1949 NFL draft.
