= 1947 All-Southern Conference football team =

The 1947 All-Southern Conference football team consists of American football players chosen by the Associated Press (AP) for the All-Southern Conference football team for the 1947 college football season.

== All-Southern Conference selections ==
=== Backs ===
- Charlie Justice, North Carolina (AP-1)
- Jack Cloud, William & Mary (AP-1)
- Fred Folger, Jr., Duke (AP-1)
- Lucien Gambino, Maryland (AP-1)

=== Ends ===
- Art Weiner, North Carolina (AP-1)
- Robert Steckroth, William & Mary (AP-1)

=== Tackles ===
- Len Szafaryn, North Carolina (AP-1)
- Malachi Mills, VMI (AP-1)

=== Guards ===
- Knox Ramsey, William & Mary (AP-1)
- Edward Royston, Wake Forest (AP-1)

=== Centers ===
- Tommy Thompson, William & Mary (AP-1)

== Key ==
AP = Associated Press

== See also ==
- 1947 College Football All-America Team
