= Tommy Thompson (linebacker) =

American football player (1927–1990)

- Thompson on a 1952 football card

No. 34, 23, 24, 54
- Positions: Linebacker, center

Personal information
- Born: January 6, 1927; Jersey City, New Jersey, U.S.
- Died: October 1, 1990 (aged 63); Baltimore, Maryland, U.S.
- Listed height: 6 ft 1 in (1.85 m)
- Listed weight: 221 lb (100 kg)

Career information
- High school: Woodbridge (NJ)
- College: William & Mary (1944, 1946-1948)
- NFL draft: 1948: 3rd round, 16th overall pick

Career history
- Cleveland Browns (1949–1953)

Awards and highlights
- NFL champion (1950); AAFC champion (1949); First-team All-Pro (1953); 2× Second-team All-Pro (1951, 1952); Third-team All-American (1948); 2× First-team All-SoCon (1947, 1948); William & Mary Hall of Fame (1969); Virginia Sports Hall of Fame (1975)

Career NFL/AAFC statistics
- Games played: 54
- Games started: 34
- Interceptions: 6
- Fumble recoveries: 8
- Stats at Pro Football Reference

Thomas Wright Thompson (January 6, 1927 – October 1, 1990) was an American professional football linebacker and center who played for the Cleveland Browns in the All-America Football Conference (AAFC) and the National Football League (NFL) in the late 1940s and early 1950s. He played college football at the College of William & Mary in Virginia.

Thompson was a standout athlete at his high school in New Jersey. He continued playing football at William & Mary between 1944 and 1948 – his career was interrupted by a year of service in the U.S. military during World War II – and helped the team to a series of winning records and bowl appearances. He was named an all-Southern Conference center three times in college and was a third-string All-American in 1948, his senior year.

Thompson joined the Browns in 1949 and played primarily as a linebacker as the team won the AAFC championship. The Browns joined the NFL in 1950 and won the league championship that year. Thompson was a leader for Cleveland, serving as its captain in 1952 and 1953, his final two seasons. He was named a first-team All-Pro in 1953. After retiring, Thompson worked as a financial executive and was a trustee at William & Mary. He was inducted into his college's athletics hall of fame in 1969 and into the Virginia Sports Hall of Fame in 1975. He died of cancer in 1990.

== Early life and college ==
Thompson grew up in Woodbridge Township, New Jersey and attended Woodbridge High School. He played football there and was named an all-state athlete under head coach Nick Priscoe. After graduating, Thompson attended the College of William & Mary in Virginia, where he continued to play football as a center. He also played linebacker on defense for the William & Mary Indians, often staying on the field for the entire duration of games. Thompson played for William & Mary in 1944 and between 1946 and 1948 – his career was interrupted by a brief stint in the U.S. Army during World War II. He was a leader on the team and an anchor of its line.

William & Mary finished with an 8–2 win–loss record in 1946, and Thompson was named an all-Virginia center. The team improved to 9–2 the following year under head coach Rube McCray and won the Southern Conference, but lost to Arkansas in the Dixie Bowl. Thompson was again named an all-Virginia player and was named to an all-Southern Conference team. The Associated Press also named him an honorable mention All-American. In 1948, William & Mary posted a 7–2–2 win–loss–tie record and beat Oklahoma State in the Delta Bowl. Thompson was an all-state player for the third time in a row and an all-Southern Conference player for the second year running. The Associated Press named him a third-string All-American, and he was selected to play in the annual College All-Star Game, a now-defunct matchup between the champion of the professional National Football League (NFL) and a selection of the best college players in the country.

== Professional career ==
Thompson was drafted in the third round of the 1948 NFL draft by the Washington Redskins of the NFL, but he instead signed with the Cleveland Browns of the All-America Football Conference (AAFC), a team coached by Paul Brown. Led by a sturdy defense and an offense that featured quarterback Otto Graham, fullback Marion Motley and end Dante Lavelli, the Browns finished with a 9–1–2 record in 1949 and won the AAFC championship. Thompson spent some time at center during his rookie year, but was mostly a middle linebacker in the Browns' 5-3 defense in his first three seasons.

The AAFC dissolved after the 1949 season, and the Browns were absorbed by the more established NFL. The Browns won the NFL championship in 1950, and advanced to the championship game but lost each year between 1951 and 1953, Thompson's last season. During his last two years, he was the right-side linebacker after Cleveland switched to a 5-2 defense. He was named a second-team All-Pro in 1951 and 1952 and a first-team All-Pro in 1953. Thompson, who was known as a sure tackler and a tenacious leader on defense, was the Browns' team captain in his final two seasons.

== Later life and death ==
Thompson started a career in the financial industry after retiring from football. He was inducted into the William & Mary Athletics Hall of Fame in 1969 and the Virginia Sports Hall of Fame in 1975. Thompson, who served on William & Mary's board of trustees, was appointed a senior vice president at the brokerage Shearson Lehman Hutton in early 1990, heading the company's Baltimore office. He died of cancer in later that year. Thompson and his wife, Elizabeth, had four children.
