= William W. McCarty =

William Washington McCarty
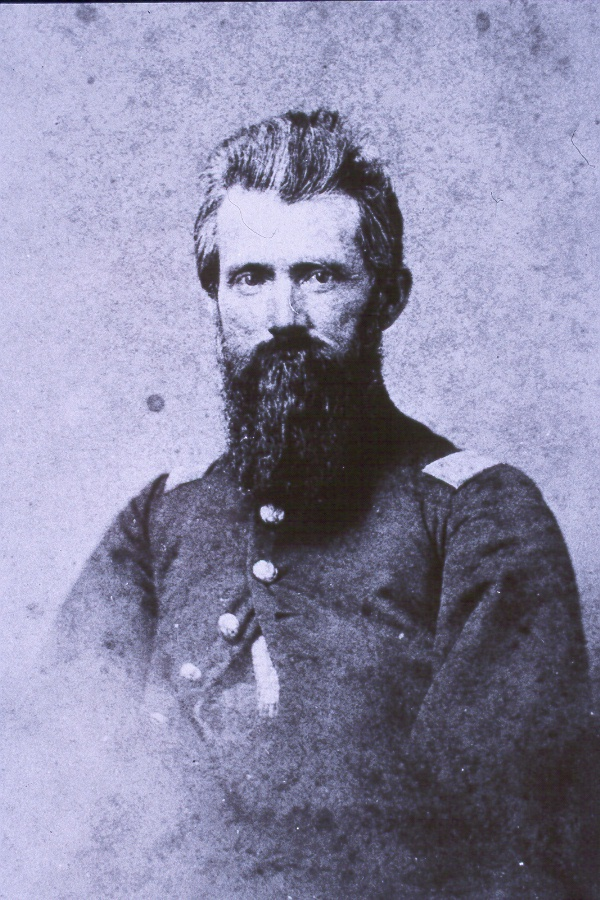
- Capt. W. W. McCarty, Co. E, 78 Ohio Veteran Volunteer Infantry
- Born: March 18, 1817; Loudoun County, Virginia, US
- Died: June 5, 1889 (aged 72); McConnelsville, Ohio, US
- Spouse: Sarah Edmunds Wood (1821-1904)
- Children: 4
- Military career
- Allegiance: United States
- Branch: Union Army; 78th Ohio Infantry Regiment
- Service years: 1861–65 (Army)
- Rank: Captain (Army)
- Unit: 78th Ohio Veteran Volunteer Infantry
- Conflicts: American Civil War; Battle of Fort Donelson; Battle of Shiloh; Siege of Vicksburg; Battle of Kennesaw Mountain; Siege of Atlanta; March to the Sea; Occupation of Raleigh; Battle of Bentonville; Grand Review
- Other work: Mayor of McConnelsville, 1871 & '72 Morgan County Recorder, 1872-76 Co-publisher, Morgan County Herald

William Washington McCarty (March 18, 1817 – June 5, 1889) of McConnelsville, Ohio was a captain in Company E of the 78th Ohio Veteran Volunteer Infantry in the American Civil War. He enlisted as a 1st lieutenant and was promoted to captain on February 14, 1863; he served from December 23, 1861 to May 25, 1865. He was responsible for the formation of Co. E, and recruited many of the men who joined the company.

His experiences as a prisoner of war as chronicled in his essay, History of Prison Life, and Southern Prisons, which appears in the regimental history, is extremely insightful about race relations in the South at that time, and the reaction of slaves to the presence of Union troops.

During one escape attempt when he and his fellow escapees were at large for about a week, they had several encounters with slaves. Whenever they found a black, not accompanied by any whites, they would approach him or her and identify themselves as Yankee POWs. They would then be given shelter, food and otherwise helped along their journey. This narrative has been termed a "reverse underground railroad." McCarty in his essay cites several examples of how he and his colleagues were aided by blacks in this manner during their escape from Camp Sorghum in Columbia, South Carolina. The essay is in the form of two letters sent to Chaplain Thomas M. Stevenson, the author of the regimental history.

In addition to being a POW from July 22, 1864 to Nov. 8, 1864, he was listed as wounded at Missionary Ridge Aug. 9, 1862.

After the war McCarty served as mayor of McConnelsville in 1870 and 1871, and as county recorder from 1872 to 1876.

McCarty was born 18 March 1817, in Loudoun County, Virginia. Shortly thereafter his family moved to Morgan County, Ohio. In addition to his political activities, he was for some years a partner with James Adair in publishing the Morgan County Herald and served several consecutive terms as a justice of the peace. He died in 1889.

== Quotes from McCarty's History of Prison Life, and Southern Prisons ==
=== Treatment in a rebel hospital and McCarty's witnessing of the beating of an African American POW from the 54th Massachusetts ===
"Here [in Charleston, SC] I received my first letter from home. It was the first time for nine or ten weeks that I had heard one word of information about the fate of my company, or whether my family knew anything of my whereabouts or what had become of me. My mind was relieved of a heavy load of anxiety, but still I was a prisoner. About the middle of September I had a severe attack of intermittent fever, as did also my messmate, Colonel Clancy. We were both sick at the same time. I was taken to a hospital in the city, where, in justice to the rebel surgeon, I feel bound to say I received good medical attention. I only remained here a week, when my chills being checked, I was conveyed to a convalescent hospital three miles from the city, where my medical attention was also good. This hospital was in charge of G. R. C. Todd, a brother-in-law of President Lincoln. The doctor was an ardent rebel, and one incident occurred there which I shall not soon forget. A colored prisoner, belonging to a Massachusetts regiment, who had been taken at Fort Wagner, was accused by the guard of spitting from the portico of the building down into the yard, and without any investigation whatever, the doctor caused him to be stripped and tied, and receive thirty lashes on his naked back. The indignation of our sick prisoners was intense at this brutal treatment inflicted by the hand of a man far inferior to the negro, for the latter could read and write, while the other could do neither and could scarcely tell his name. The negro was a prisoner of war, born and educated in a free State, and he was entitled to the same protection and treatment that we were, and doctor could assign no other reason for his violation of the rules of warfare, than that the boy was a “d—-d nigger.” But perhaps the doctor will apply for pardon now."

=== An encounter of McCarty's POW group with a "gentleman of color" ===
"As we were evidently nearing the town, we were again troubled to know how we should get around it and reach the river, where we expected to find boats. We struck off on a road which we supposed would take us to the river south of town, but traveling but a short distance we found ourselves in the town, where a retreat was as hazardous as anything else. It was about midnight and the moon shone brightly, so we marched quietly through the village, until we reached the southern boundary, where we chanced to meet a 'gentleman of color.' The white people 'slumbered and slept.' Our colored friend informed us that there was no boat at the river, but what was guarded by the rebels. We had by this time became exceedingly hungry and tired, but no alternative was left but to push on to some other point. Branchville was our next hope, which was sixteen miles south of Orangeburg and also on the Edisto river. So off we started, taking the railroad track as the safest route. After traveling in this direction two mile, we met a negro man and his wife on their way toward Orangeburg. We found them to be friendly and trusty. The man, whose name was 'Toney,' lived a mile further down the road, and his wife lived in Orangeburg. Toney said if we would go on down near massa’s plantation and wait, he would help his wife carry up the forage which they had evidently been getting off massa’s plantation, and return and show us a hiding place, as it was approaching daybreak. We took him at his word, and sure enough, Tony soon returned and conducted us to a dense forest, where we kindled a fire to warm ourselves, and took a short sleep. About 9 o’clock in the morning Toney came out with a basket of provisions, which I assure you we relished. Pone, sweet potatoes, rice, boiled and fried, fresh pork, were luxuries which we did not often indulge in, except the pone."

=== McCarty's parole and his admiration for the "trusty negros" ===
"As the rebel officers could not control us very well in [Camp] 'Sorghum,' they removed us to the asylum grounds in the city. These grounds were enclosed by a brick wall about twelve feet high. From this place our only channel of escape was through tunnels, and we had one nearly completed when Sherman frustrated our work by advancing too rapidly upon the city. We were hastened away in great fright to Charlotte, in North Carolina, where we were all paroled for exchange and sent to Raleigh; thence to Goldsboro, thence to Rocky Point, ten miles from Wilmington, where we passed through our lines on the 1st of March, 1865.

"Our reception by General Schofield’s army was grand imposing. A magnificently decorated arch of evergreens was erected over the road. On either side the old flag with its stars and stripes was unfurled to the breeze, and as we passed through in four ranks, led by a famous brass band, nearly every heart was ready to burst with joy; and when once through, you would have laughed and cried too, as some of us did, to hear the loud huzzas and seen the old blankets, hats, tin pans and tattered coats, sailing in the air from our liberated prisoners, some of whom had been captives over two years.

"We set sail for Annapolis the next day, and on arriving there we immediately divested ourselves of our rags and “creeping things,” putting them in one common pile for conflagration. The next day we had to take the second look to recognize each other, as we were all alike disguised with new suits of clothes.

"During my sojourn in rebel prisons, I met with a large number of honest, simple-hearted people, well disposed, and who had no heart in the rebellion. Many also who were extremely ignorant of the cases of the rebellion, or anything connected therewith. I also found, even among the intelligent, some well disposed and gentlemanly officers and citizens; indeed I might safely say that these two classes constituted a majority of those with whom I became acquainted. But among the ringer-leaders and those high in authority, as also some of the 'roughs,' I found many who well deserve the rope.

"In all my experience, I have never met with a treacherous negro. That there are some, I have not a doubt, but all I met with I found trusty, and many of them more intelligent than the poor whites. The field-hands, however, on the cotton plantations, are very ignorant and debased."
