= Tiger Stadium =

Tiger Stadium most commonly refers to:

- Tiger Stadium (Detroit), former home of the Detroit Tigers baseball team
- Tiger Stadium (Louisiana), home of the Louisiana State University Tigers football team

Tiger Stadium may also refer to:

- Tiger Stadium (Corsicana), high school stadium in Corsicana, Texas
- Tiger Stadium (West Alabama), home of the University of West Alabama Tigers football team
- Paul Brown Tiger Stadium, Massillon, Ohio

== See also ==
- Comerica Park, Detroit, the present home of Detroit Tigers baseball team
