= Massillon City School District =

Public school district for Massillon, Ohio

Location
- Massillon, Ohio

District information
- Type: Public
- Grades: PK-12
- Established: 1848
- Superintendent: Paul Salvino
- Asst. superintendent(s): Mark Fortner
- Schools: 6
- NCES District ID: 3904435

Students and staff
- Students: 4000
- Teachers: 245
- Student–teacher ratio: 16.35:1

Other information
- Website: massillonschools.org

Massillon City School District is a public school district serving students in the city of Massillon, Ohio, United States. The district currently consists of one 9-12 grade high school, one 4-8 grade middle school, three K-3 grade neighborhood elementary schools, and one preschool. The Massillon City School District is the main district in Massillon serving much of the city-limits.

== Schools ==
- Massillon Public Preschool (PK)
- Franklin Elementary (K-3)
- Gorrell Elementary (K-3)
- Whittier Elementary (K-3)
- Massillon Middle (4-8) (Combination of Massillon Intermediate & Jr High)
- Washington High (9-12)

== History ==
In 1848, the citizens of Massillon passed a school levy to build the first public school in the city called Union School. With the growth of the city due to the canal port and the arrival of the railroad, a second school was built on the city's west side called West Massillon Union School in 1866.

With more people moving to the city in search of jobs, more schools were constructed to accommodate the influx of children into the city. Cherry Street Elementary was built in 1881, West Main School in 1884, Lincoln Elementary school in 1888, and State Street School in 1896.

In 1894, Massillon Union High School played its first football game against Canton Central High School. The football team mascot became the Tigers, the same mascot used by the Massillon Tigers professional club team. The Massillon Tigers would celebrate their first undefeated season in 1909.

Oak Park elementary school was built in 1901 and was renamed Emerson Elementary in 1913, and Harvey Elementary school was built in 1910. In 1912, a new high school was built near downtown and was named Washington High School in honor of the country's first president.

In 1915, West Brookfield School (constructed in 1905) located on the city's far west side became part of the Massillon city school district. Edmund A. Jones Junior High School and Horace Mann Elementary School were both opened in 1920, and Lorin Andrews Junior High (named for Lorin Andrews) and Longfellow Junior High School (site of the original Union School) opened in 1923.

In 1929, Vinedale School located on the city's far east side (built in 1905) became part of the Massillon school district and was renamed Lewis E. York Elementary School. Lewis E. York Elementary was replaced with a new building in 1939, along with the construction of Whittier Elementary (replacing the State Street school) and a new building replacing the original Emerson Elementary school.

The year 1939 was also the year a new 18,000 seat football stadium was constructed on the city's east side to accommodate the success of the Massillon Tiger football team, which was coached by Paul Brown during this period. The stadium was named Tiger Stadium, replacing Massillon Athletic Field built and dedicated in 1924 with Paul Brown in attendance as a Junior QB on Massillon team. The stadium was renamed Paul Brown Tiger Stadium in 1976 in honor of Paul Brown.

In 1957, Franklin Elementary and Gorrell Elementary schools were built. A new Lincoln Elementary school building was built in 1958, and Bowers Elementary school was built in 1965 on the city's far west side replacing the West Brookfield school. L. J. Smith Elementary was built in 1966.

The 1970s and 80s was a trying time for the city and the school district, when the city experienced a steep decline in its manufacturing and steel industry. The first downsizing of district school buildings in the history of the school system resulted in the closing of Horace Mann elementary school in 1974, Jones Junior High School in 1980, and both Harvey and Lincoln elementary schools in 1981.

The 1990s was the start of a new era in the Massillon City School District with voters passing a levy in 1991 to construct a new Washington High School next to Paul Brown Tiger Stadium on the city's east side. Voters approved another levy in 2005 to construct a new 5-8th grade middle school on the city's west side, replacing both Longfellow and Lorin Andrew Junior High Schools. However, in 2012, the school district closed two elementary schools: Bowers and Emerson. Along with Washington High School and the new Massillon Middle School, the district continues to operate three elementary schools: Franklin, Whittier, and Gorrell. Massillon Middle School Changed into a 4th-6th grade Intermediate School and a 7th-8th Jr. High School. Smith Elementary also closed and is used to house administration offices and Massillon Public Preschool.

In 2019, the district proposed a project that would replace the districts 4 ageing elementary (and preschool) buildings. Under this plan there would be 2 new PK-3 elementary buildings on each side of the city. East Side Elementary is to be built on the current Washington High/Athletic campus while the West Side Elementary will be on the Massillon Middle Campus. The design prosses is expected to be complete in 2023 and the building are to open for the 2025-2026 school year.
