= Mortimer Dormer Leggett =

American lawyer, military officer and educator (1821–1896)

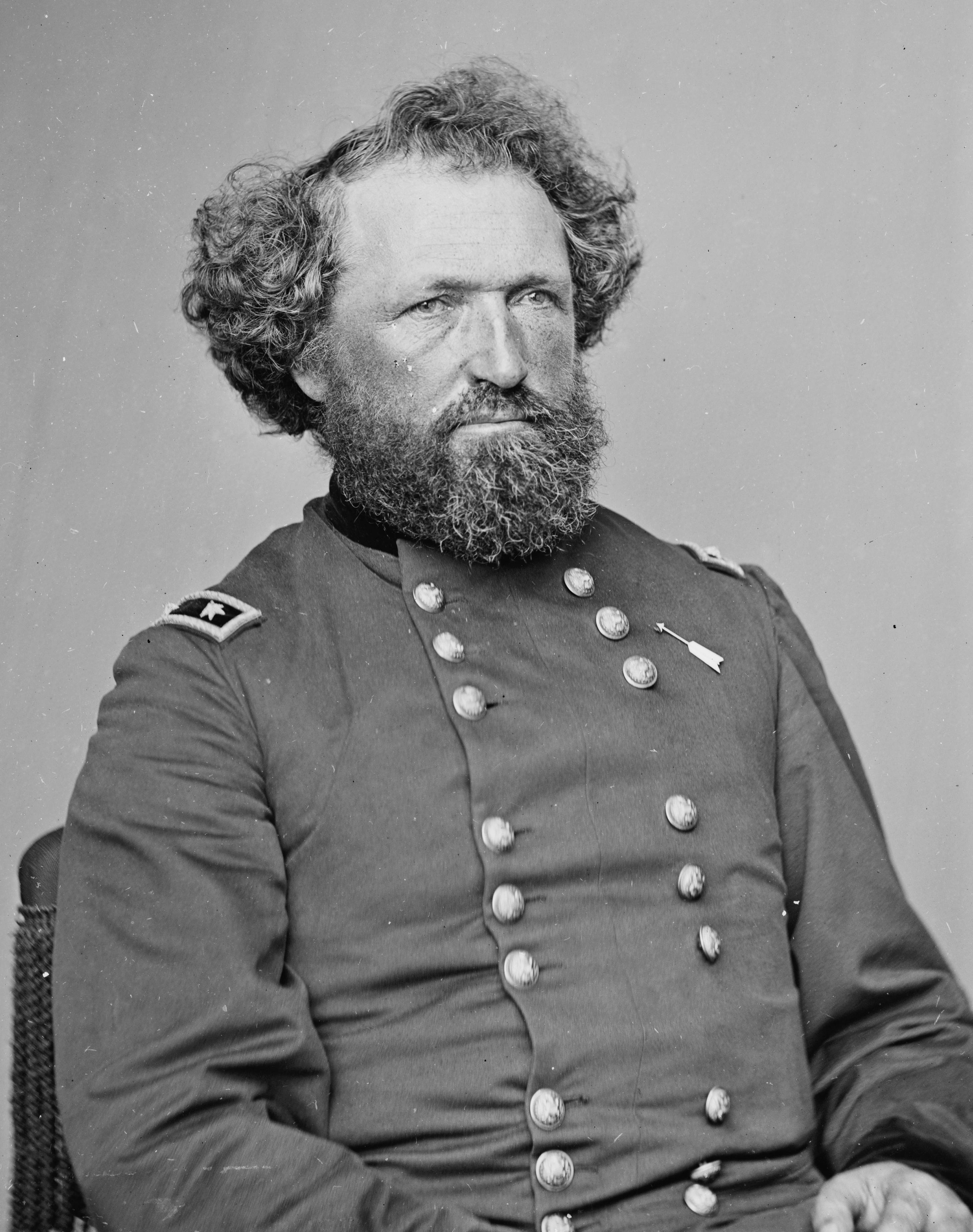
- Leggett, 1860–1865
- Born: April 19, 1821; Ithaca, New York
- Died: January 6, 1896 (aged 74); Cleveland, Ohio
- Burial place: Lake View Cemetery, Cleveland, Ohio
- Military career
- Allegiance: United States of America; Union
- Branch: United States Army; Union Army
- Rank: Major General
- Commands: 78th Ohio Infantry Regiment; 3rd Division, XVII Corps
- Conflicts: American Civil War

Mortimer Dormer Leggett (April 19, 1821 – January 6, 1896) was a lawyer, school administrator, professor, and a general of the Union Army during the American Civil War.

== Early life ==
Leggett was born in Ithaca, New York, but relocated to Geauga County, Ohio, with his parents when he was fifteen years old. He and his father created a farm out of the wilderness area. He studied first medicine and then law, which he practiced with some success in Akron, Ohio. He taught in the Akron and Warren public schools to supplement his income from his legal business, helping to establish the graded-school system now common. In 1848, together with Lorin Andrews, Mortimer became editor of The Free School Clarion, a journal dedicated to education. From 1855 to 1858, he was a professor of pleading and practice in the Ohio College of Law in Poland, and in 1858 became superintendent of schools at Zanesville, Ohio. He was a law partner of Jacob D. Cox.

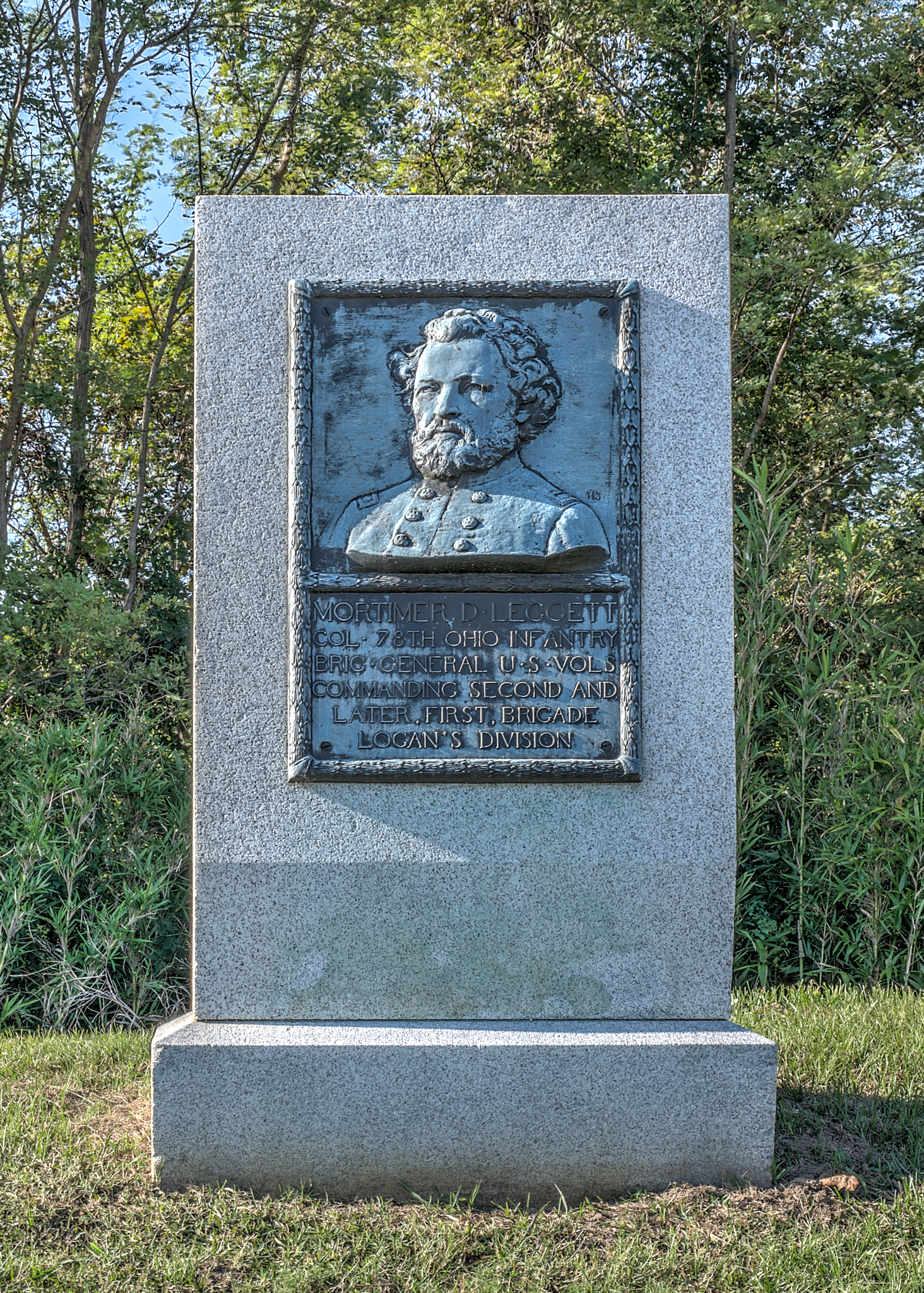
Relief portrait of Leggett at Vicksburg National Military Park

== Civil War ==
At the beginning of the Civil War, Leggett served as a volunteer on the staff of his friend, Major General George B. McClellan in western Virginia. He helped raise the 78th Ohio Infantry Regiment and was commissioned as its colonel in January 1862. He commanded his regiment at the battles of Fort Donelson, Shiloh, and Corinth. In November 1862, he was appointed brigadier general of volunteers and participated in the Vicksburg Campaign, suffering a painful wound. After he recovered, Leggett commanded the 3rd Division of the XVII Corps during the Atlanta campaign and Sherman's March to the Sea. He was brevetted major general of volunteers in July 1864, and was commissioned as a major general a year later. His last action was in the Carolinas campaign during the spring of 1865.

== Postwar career ==
At the end of the war, Leggett returned to Zanesville and resumed his law practice. President Ulysses S. Grant appointed him as United States Commissioner of Patents in 1871; Leggett held that position until 1874, when he resigned to resume his private practice. In 1884, he founded a successful company that would become a part of General Electric.

Leggett was a member of the Cuyahoga County Soldiers' and Sailors' Monument commission and helped oversee the construction of the monument which now sits on Cleveland's Public Square. His likeness is depicted on the End of The War panel inside the structure and his name appears on plaques outside the main doors.

His son, Mortimer M. Leggett, was accidentally killed on October 14, 1873, during an initiation to the Cornell University chapter of the Kappa Alpha Society. The younger Leggett was blindfolded and walking along a railroad trestle with other initiates, when he fell, striking the back of his head. Leggett was the first person known to die in a college fraternity initiation.

Leggett died in Cleveland, Ohio, aged 74, and was buried in Lake View Cemetery.

== See also ==
- List of American Civil War generals (Union)
