= Massillon Washington High School =

Washington High School
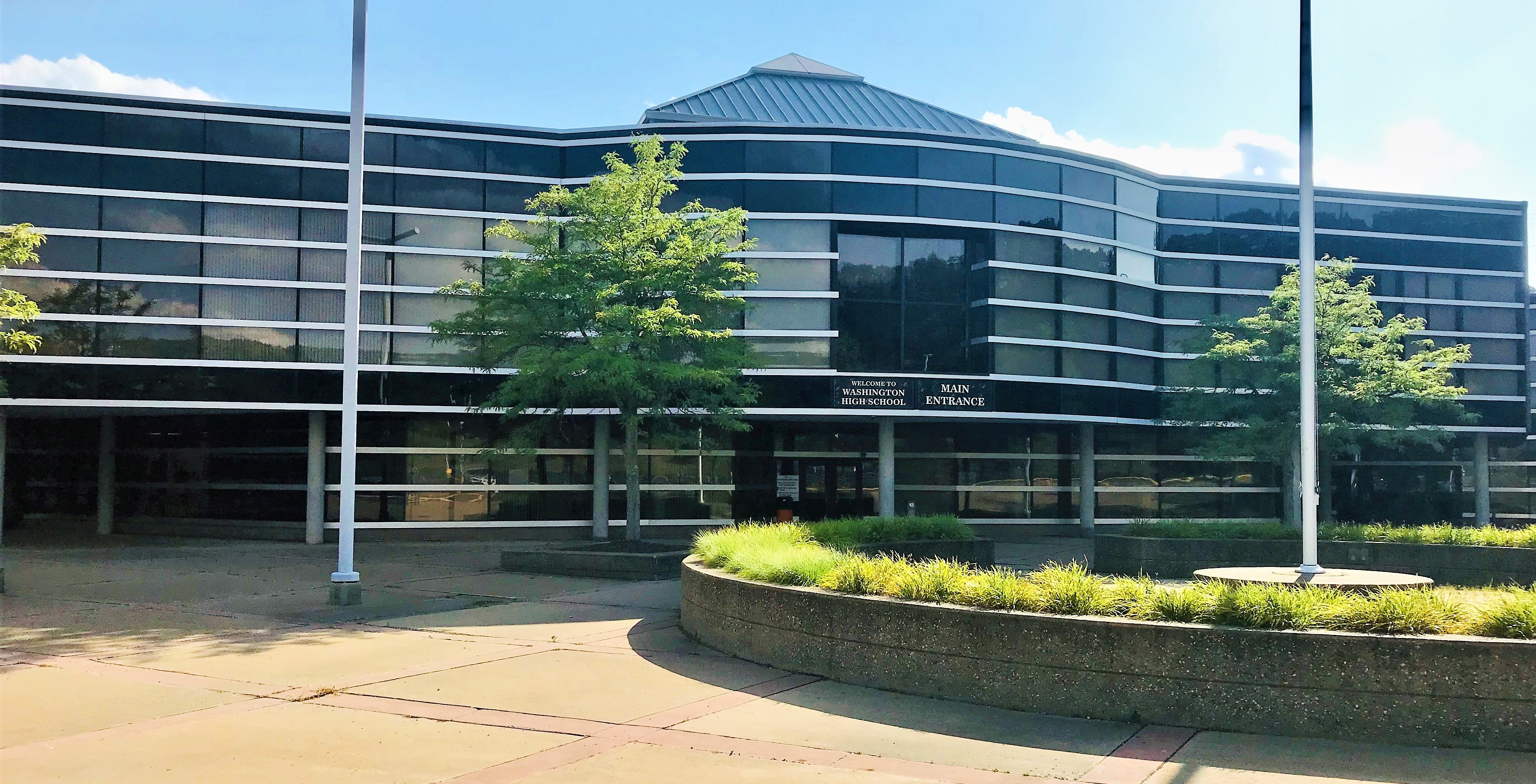
- Massillon Washington High School, July 2022

Location
- 1 Paul E. Brown Drive S.E. Massillon, Ohio 44646-3407; United States; 40.792678°N 81.502912°W

Information
- Type: Public high school
- Established: 1914
- School district: Massillon City School District
- Principal: David Latunshleger
- Teaching staff: 76.87 (FTE)
- Grades: 9–12
- Enrollment: 1,230 (2023-2024)
- Student to teacher ratio: 16.00
- Language: English
- Campus: Suburban
- Colors: Orange and Black
- Team name: Tigers
- Rival: McKinley Bulldogs
- Accreditation: Ohio Department of Education; North Central Association of Schools and Colleges
- Website: Washington High School

Washington High School (also referred to as Massillon High School or Massillon Washington High School) is a public high school located in Massillon, Ohio. It is the only high school in the Massillon City School District. Athletic teams are known as the Tigers, and they compete as a member of the Ohio High School Athletic Association.

== History ==
Opened in 1914, Washington High School serves students grades 9-12.

The original Washington High School was constructed in 1914 and used to sit on the corner of Oak and 1st street southeast in downtown Massillon. Later additions were made to the building in 1922, 1936, 1957 and 1965. Numerous bonds were denied of building a new high school between 1979-1987. The bond was finally approved in 1988, with construction beginning in 1990. In 1992, The current Washington High School was opened adjacent to Paul Brown Tiger Stadium.

== Academics ==
Washington High School provides programs including college readiness and vocational technical careers. Developing Resources for Education and Athletics in Massillon (D.R.E.A.M) is a collaborative effort through the Paul & Carol David Foundation, Massillon schools, Walsh University and the Aultman Health Foundation and provides students interested in a career in sports medicine to earn college credits in high school. Rated an "Excellent" school district by the Ohio Department of Education.

== Athletics ==
=== OHSAA State championships ===
- Boys' basketball – 2025
- Football – 2023

Non-OHSAA sanctioned state championships

Football – 1909, 1916, 1922, 1935, 1936, 1937, 1938, 1939, 1940, 1941, 1943, 1949, 1950, 1951, 1952, 1953, 1959, 1960, 1961, 1964, 1965, 1970

*State championships decided by popular acclaim and Associated Press from 1909– 1970

==== Associated Press national championships ====
Football - 1935, 1936, 1939, 1940, 1950, 1952, 1953, 1959, 1961

=== Football ===
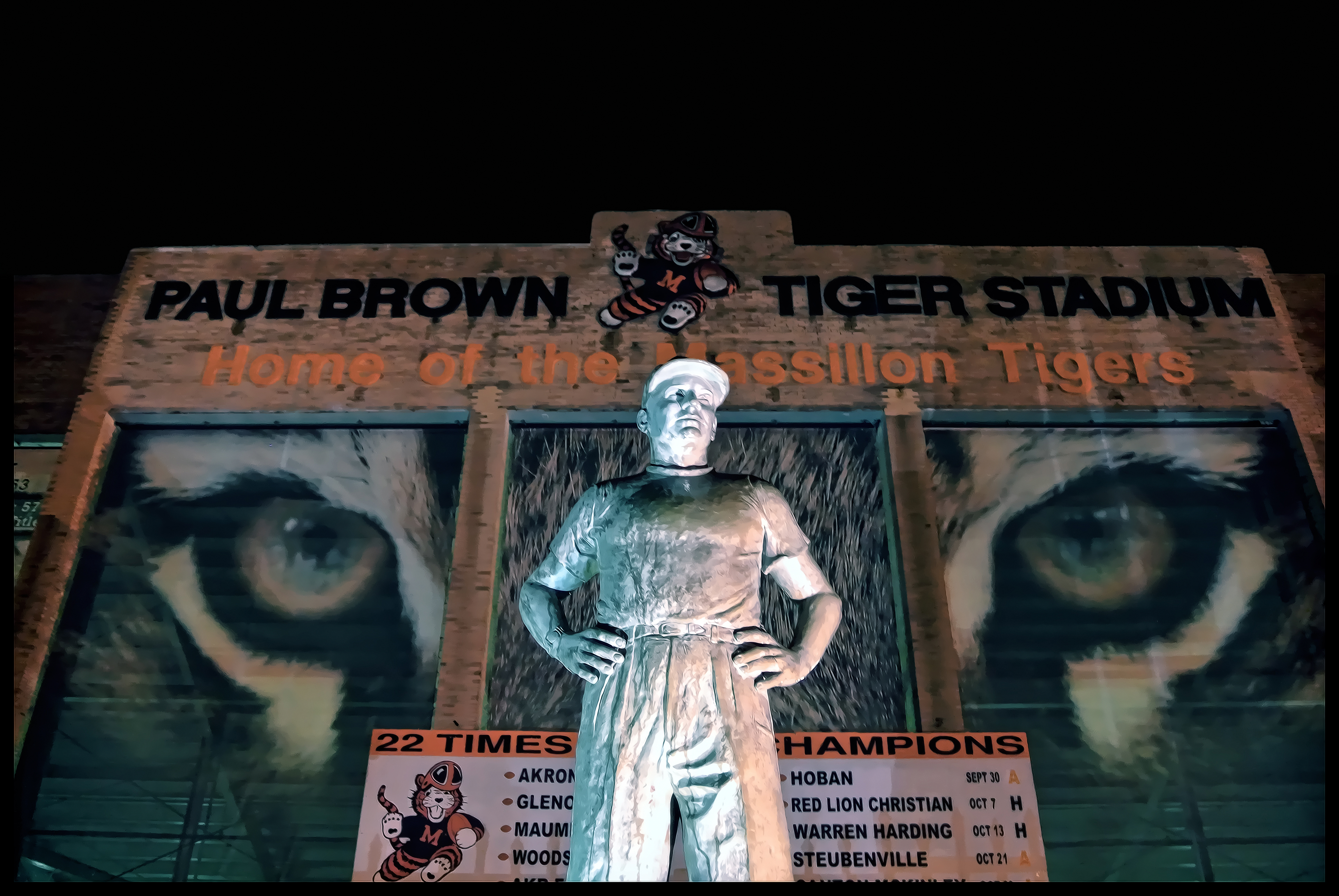
Paul Brown Tiger Stadium, named for 1925 graduate Paul Brown

Football came to the Massillon in 1894 with the first high school football game between Massillon High School and Canton Central High School. In the early years, the players consisted of working boys because most boys did not attend high school. By 1904 more boys began attending school past 8th grade. 1909 was Massillon's first undefeated football team. From 1910 to 1920 high school football in Massillon grew and improved, and by 1916 they were named the Scholastic Champions of Ohio. The school mascot, the Tiger, was adopted from the city's former professional football team known as the Massillon Tigers.

Paul Brown, a 1925 graduate of Washington High School, returned to Massillon in 1932 to begin his renowned coaching career. In his nine years at Massillon, Brown posted an 80–8–2 record which included a 35-game winning streak and six state championships. The school's football stadium was named in Brown's honor.

The Massillon Tigers have accumulated 25 “state AP championships” and 9 “national AP championships” during the school's history. As of 2012, the Tigers have accumulated an overall record of 837-249-35, a record not approached by any other Ohio high school football team. In the years since the Ohio high school playoff system was instituted in 1972, the Tigers have accumulated a current record of 316-117-4. The Tigers have made the playoffs 19 times, the final four six times, and the final championship game three times. There have been 23 professional players, 3 NFL coaches, and 14 collegiate all-Americans that have graduated from Massillon Washington High School.

Washington High School previously held the record for the most playoff appearances by a high school football team without actually winning a state championship since 1970. The Tigers won 7-2 against Archbishop Hoban High School on 30 November 2023 to clinch the OHSAA D-II state football championship, thus ending a 53 year drought.

In the summer 2008, ESPN nominated the city of Massillon as a candidate for Titletown USA. The final results ended with Massillon finishing in the top 4.

=== Paul Brown Stadium ===
The Tigers play their home games at Paul Brown Tiger Stadium. The stadium currently holds 16,600 people and is named after former Tiger player and head coach Paul Brown. Besides being the regular season home of the Massillon Tiger Football team, the stadium hosts Ohio High School Athletic Association state football playoff games, divisional championship games, as well as numerous other activities such as band shows and other sports including soccer.

== Extracurricular activities ==
=== Massillon Tiger Swing Band ===
The Massillon Tiger Swing Band was created by George "Red" Bird in 1938 during the Paul Brown era of Massillon football. The band has been credited by some as "The Greatest Show in High School Football."

The Tiger Swing band begins every home football game with the traditional hometown songs of "Massillon Will Shine", "Stand Up and Cheer", “Eye of the Tiger”, “Seven Nation Army”, The W.H.S. Alma Mater, and the Star-Spangled Banner. At the beginning of each half time show, they perform what is known as "Opening Routine". This is a tradition that goes back for decades and consists of the band's entrance ("Turn Arounds") followed by "Fanfare", "Tiger Rag" and "Carry On".

== Notable alumni ==
- Andy Alleman, former professional football player in the National Football League (NFL)
- Robert Arter former U.S. Army lieutenant general
- Paul Brown, former National Football League coach and executive. Co-founder of the Cincinnati Bengals and Cleveland Browns
- Earle Bruce, former college football coach
- David Canary former television actor
- Dean Clark, professional football player in the National Football League (NFL)
- Zion Clark, professional wrestler, mixed martial artist and wheelchair racer
- Gareon Conley, former professional football player in the National Football League (NFL)
- Shawn Crable, former professional football player in the National Football League (NFL)
- Bill Edwards, former professional and college football coach
- Harold G. Epperson, WWII Medal of Honor Recipient.
- Homer Floyd, former professional football player in the Canadian Football League (CFL)
- Dennis Franklin, former professional football player in the National Football League (NFL)
- Horace Gillom, former professional football player in the National Football League (NFL)
- Bobby Grier- former college football player
- Tommy Hannon, former professional football player in the National Football League (NFL)
- Lin Houston, former professional football player in the National Football League (NFL)s
- Don James, former college football coach
- Tommy James, former professional football player in the National Football League (NFL)
- Mark Kozelek lead singer of Sun Kil Moon; actor
- Lori Lightfoot former Mayor of Chicago
- Ernest W. Maglischo, former college swimmer and PhD
- Ed Molinski, former college football player
- Jack Oliver, geophysicist
- Devin Smith, former professional football player in the National Football League (NFL)
- Chris Spielman former professional football player in the National Football League (NFL)
- Harry Stuhldreher, former college football player and coach
- Jeff Timmons singer-songwriter/musician, founder/member of 98 Degrees
- Stanfield Wells, former college football player
- Erik White, former college football player
- George Whitfield Jr., former Arena Football League player
- Alex Wood former college football player, professional and college football coach
- Justin Zwick, former college football player
