= Lorin Andrews =

Educator and school reformer from Ohio

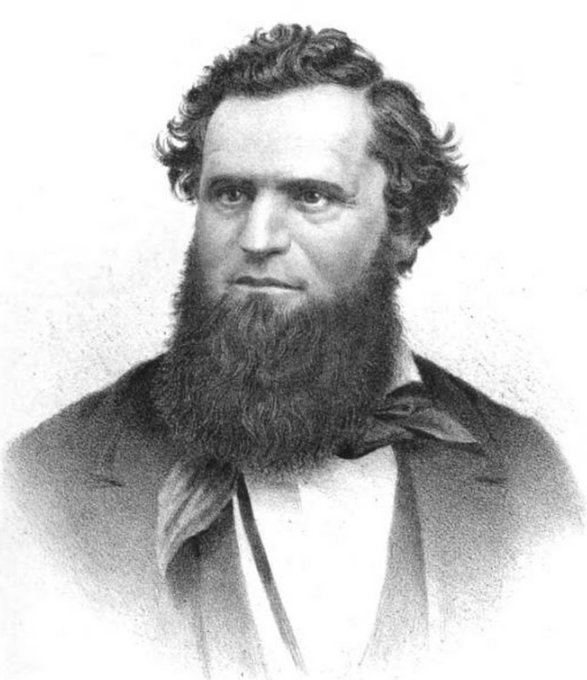
- Born: April 1, 1819; Ashland, Ohio, U.S.
- Died: September 26, 1862 (aged 43); Gambier, Ohio, U.S.
- Occupation: Educator

Lorin Andrews (April 1, 1819 – September 26, 1861) was an educator and school reformer in Ohio. He co-founded the Ohio Teachers Association in 1848 and he was the president of Kenyon College from 1853-1861. He left the position to serve in the American Civil War, and died of typhus contracted in camp.

== Early life ==
Andrews was born on April 1, 1819 to Alanson and Sally Needham Andrews in Ashland, Ohio, then called Uniontown. As a child, he worked on his father's farm and attended common schools. He married Sarah Gates on October 30, 1843, and the couple had three children, Clara Elizabeth (d. 1928) who married W. L. Rawson, Frank L. (d. 1913) who married May Munson, and Louis (died young).

== Career ==
Andrews attended Kenyon College in Gambier, Ohio from 1838 to 1840 but had to leave school before graduation because he was unable to pay tuition. Future president Rutherford B. Hayes was a member of that class. During college, he joined the Episcopal church. He then began teaching at Ashland Academy and became principale of the school by 1844. He received an honorary MA degree from Kenyon in 1846 and became interested in politics and law. He passed the bar in 1847 but did not leave the field of education. Also in 1847 he co-founded the Ohio Teachers Association. In 1848 he became teacher and superintendent of the Massillon-Union schools.

He was an advocate for school reforms including: free grade schools in towns and villages, a state education commissioner, common school libraries, township boards of education, state funding of child education, a monthly journal of education, legislative support of institutes, improved buildings, increased wages, and increased public support for education. In 1848, together with Mortimer Dormer Leggett, Andrews became editor of The Free School Clarion. He was a noted advocate of the 1853 School Law which made many of these reforms including the election of a state school commissioner. In 1853 he ran for the office of state commissioner of schools, but was defeated.

In the early 1850s Andrews was an agent for the Ohio Teachers' Association and he served as the body's president in 1854 and 1855. In late 1853 he was elected president of Kenyon College, which had been going through financial difficulties since the 1840s. He began his duties in 1854, which included holding the title of Professor of Mental and Moral Philosophy, Political Economy, etc. Also in 1854 he received an honorary LLD from Princeton College. Andrews tenure at Kenyon was very successful and he was offered the presidency of Iowa State, which had formed in 1858, but he turned it down.

== Civil War and death ==
At the start of the American Civil War in April 1861, Andrews resigned from Kenyon to raise a company of volunteers. He was known as the first Ohioan to volunteer to fight for the Union in the Civil War, and was suggested for Governor of Ohio that summer. He was given the rank of colonel and put into command of the 4th Ohio Infantry. During the summer, he was encamped in West Virginia and led his regiment in the Battle of Rich Mountain, part of the Western Virginia Campaign. Later in the summer he became sick with typhus. He returned to Gambier and died on September 26, 1861. He was buried on the campus of Kenyon College.

== Legacy ==
A Civil War camp, Camp Andrews in Knox County, Ohio near Mount Vernon was named for Andrews. In 1866, a large shaft was erected over his grave at Kenyon College. A junior high school in Massillon, Ohio was named for him in 1923.

== Bibliography ==
- Bennett, John D. Place-names of the Civil War: Cities, Towns, Villages, Railroad Stations, Forts, Camps, Islands, Rivers, Creeks, Fords and Ferries. McFarland, 2012
- Coggeshall, William T. The Character and Services of Lorin Andrews, An address before the Ohio Teachers' Association, Mt. Vernon, July 2, 1862. Ohio Educational Monthly, Volume 11, November, 1862
- Ohles, John F., ed. Biographical dictionary of American educators. Greenwood Publishing Group, 1978.
- Shook, John R., ed. Dictionary of early American philosophers. Vol. 1. Bloomsbury Publishing, 2012.
- E E White, Pioneer Educational Journals in Ohio, The Ohio Educational Monthly, Volume 33, 1884
