= Paul Brown =

American football coach and executive (1908–1991)

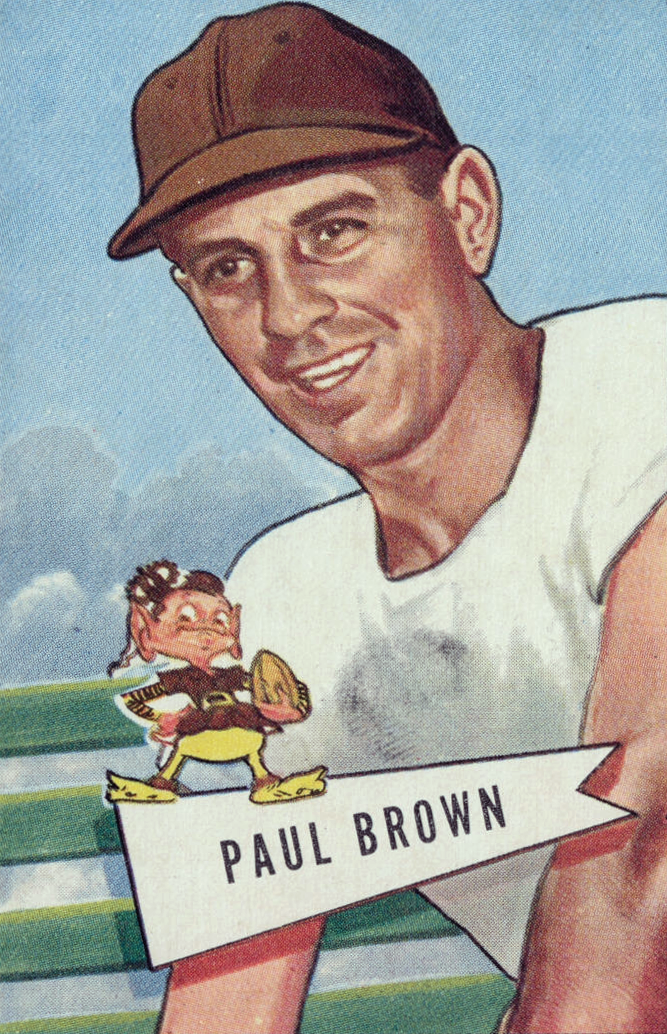
- Brown on a 1952 football card

Personal information
- Born: September 7, 1908; Norwalk, Ohio, U.S.
- Died: August 5, 1991 (aged 82); Cincinnati, Ohio, U.S.

Career information
- High school: Massillon Washington (Massillon, Ohio)
- College: Miami (OH)

Career history

Coaching
- Severn School (MD) (1930–1931) Head coach; Massillon Washington HS (OH) (1932–1940) Head coach; Ohio State (1941–1943) Head coach; Great Lakes Navy (1944–1945) Head coach; Cleveland Browns (1946–1962) Head coach; Cincinnati Bengals (1968–1975) Head coach

Operations
- Cleveland Browns (1946–1962) General manager & part-owner; Cleveland Browns (1963) Vice president; Cincinnati Bengals (1968–1991) Owner & president

Awards and highlights
- 3× NFL champion (1950, 1954, 1955); 4× AAFC champion (1946–1949); AP NFL Coach of the Year (1970); 3× UPI NFL Coach of the Year (1957, 1969, 1970); AP AFL Coach of the Year (1969); 3× The Sporting News Coach of the Year (1949, 1951, 1953); NFL 100th Anniversary All-Time Team; Cleveland Browns Ring of Honor; Cincinnati Bengals Ring of Honor; NCAA national champion (1942); 4× High school national champion (1935, 1936, 1939, 1940)

Head coaching record
- Regular season: 213–104–9 (.667)
- Postseason: 9–8 (.529)
- Career: 33–13–3 (.704) (college); 222–112–9 (.660) (pro)
- Coaching profile at Pro Football Reference
- Executive profile at Pro Football Reference
- Pro Football Hall of Fame

Paul Eugene Brown (September 7, 1908 – August 5, 1991) was an American football coach and executive in the All-America Football Conference (AAFC), the National Football League (NFL), and the American Football League (AFL). Brown was both the co-founder and first coach of the Cleveland Browns, a team named after him, and later co-founded the Cincinnati Bengals. His teams won seven league championships in a professional coaching career spanning 25 seasons.

Brown began his coaching career at Severn School in 1931 before becoming the head football coach at Massillon Washington High School in Massillon, Ohio, where he grew up. His high school teams lost only 10 games in 11 seasons. He was then hired at Ohio State University and coached the school to its first national football championship in 1942. After World War II, he became head coach of the Browns, who won all four AAFC championships before joining the NFL in 1950. Brown coached the Browns to three NFL championships — in 1950, 1954 and 1955 — but was fired in January 1963 amid a power struggle with team owner Art Modell. In 1968, Brown co-founded and was the first coach of the Bengals. He retired from coaching in 1975 but remained the Bengals' team president until his death in 1991. The Bengals named their home stadium Paul Brown Stadium in his honor. He was inducted into the Pro Football Hall of Fame in 1967.

Brown is credited with a number of American football innovations. He was the first coach to use game film to scout opponents, hire a full-time staff of assistants, and test players on their knowledge of a playbook. He invented the modern face mask, the practice squad and the draw play. He also played a role in breaking professional football's color barrier, bringing the first African-Americans to play pro football in the modern era onto his teams. Despite these accomplishments, Brown was not universally liked. He was strict and controlling, which often brought him into conflict with players who wanted a greater say in play-calling. These disputes, combined with Brown's failure to consult Modell on major personnel decisions, led to his firing as the Browns' coach in 1963.

On April 1, 2025, the NFL announced All-America Football Conference records and statistics will be recognized in its official records. This bumped Paul Brown to seventh place on the NFL's all-time head coaches wins list.

== Early life ==
Brown grew up in Massillon, Ohio, where he moved with his family from Norwalk when he was nine years of age. His father, Lester, was a dispatcher for the Wheeling and Lake Erie Railroad. Massillon was a shipping and steel town obsessed with its high school and professional football teams, both called the Tigers. Massillon's main rival at both levels was nearby Canton, a bigger and richer city. When the professional teams folded in the 1920s, the rivalry between the high school teams took center stage.

Brown entered Massillon Washington High School in 1922. Although he played football as a child, Brown was undersized for the game at less than 150 pounds and at first focused his athletic energies on the pole vault. Harry Stuhldreher, who went on to be one of Notre Dame's legendary Four Horsemen, was then the high school quarterback. But Massillon coach Dave Stewart saw Brown's determination to be a good vaulter despite his small size and brought him onto the football team; as a junior in 1924, he took over as the starting quarterback. Massillon posted a win–loss record of 15–3 in Brown's junior and senior years as the starter.

Brown graduated in 1925 and enrolled at Ohio State University the following year, hoping to make the Buckeyes team. He never got past the tryout phase. After his freshman year, he transferred to Miami University in Oxford, Ohio, where he followed Weeb Ewbank as the school's starting quarterback. Under Coach Chester Pittser, Brown was named to the All-Ohio small-college second team by the Associated Press at the end of 1928. In two seasons at Miami, Brown guided the team to a 14–3 record. He was a member of the Kappa chapter of Delta Kappa Epsilon. He married his high school sweetheart, Katie Kester, the following year. Brown had taken pre-law at Miami and considered studying history on a Rhodes Scholarship, but after college he instead took his first job as a coach. On Stewart's recommendation, Severn School, a private prep school in Maryland, hired him in 1930.

== High school coaching career ==
=== Severn School ===
Brown spent two very successful years at Severn. The team was undefeated in his first season and won the Maryland state championship. In 1931, the team's win-loss-tie record was 5–2–1. Brown's overall record was 12–2–1. After his second year, Massillon's head coaching job became available, and Brown took the position.

=== Massillon Tigers ===
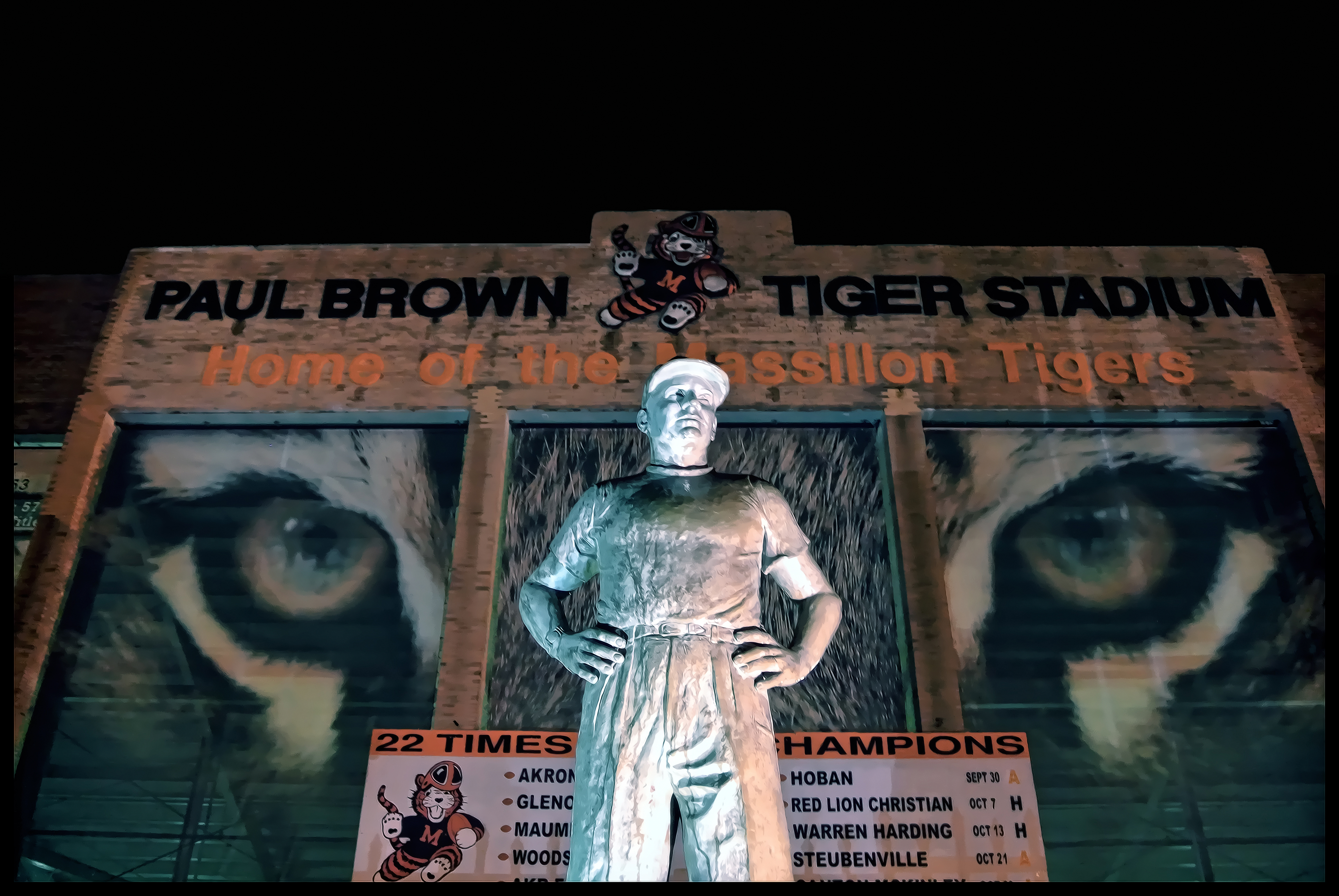
Brown convinced Massillon Washington officials to build a new, bigger football stadium. Completed in 1939, the facility is named Paul Brown Tiger Stadium.

Brown returned to Massillon in 1932, when he was 24 years old and barely two years out of college. His assignment was to turn around a Tigers team that had fallen into mediocrity over the six seasons since the departure of Stewart, Brown's old coach. In 1931, the year before Brown arrived, the Tigers finished with a 2–6–2 record. Brown's strategy was to build up a disciplined, hard-working team. He fired an assistant early on for arriving at a practice late because he had to work on his farm. No Tigers player was allowed to sit on the bench during a game; Brown made them stand. At Massillon, Brown put in an offense and blocking scheme he learned from Duke's Jimmy DeHart and Purdue's Noble Kizer. He emphasized quickness over strength.

In his first season at Massillon, Brown's team posted a 5–4–1 record, better than the previous year but far from Brown's exacting standards. The Tigers improved again in 1933, ending with an 8–2 record but losing to their chief rivals, the Canton McKinley High School Bulldogs. In 1934, Massillon won all of its games until a 21–6 defeat to McKinley in the final game of the season. As the pressure on Brown grew to turn the tables on McKinley, Massillon finally accomplished the feat the following year in an undefeated season, the first of several with Brown at the helm.

By then, Brown had put his system into place: a strict, systematic approach to coaching combined with a well-organized recruitment network that drew promising young players from Massillon's junior high school football program. He paid no attention to race, and brought several African-American players onto the team at a time when many northern schools excluded them.

In the ensuing five seasons, Massillon lost only one game, a 7–0 defeat at New Castle, Pennsylvania, in 1937 after several players came down with the flu. As the Tigers' prestige grew, Brown in 1936 convinced the school to build a new stadium almost triple the size of the existing 7,000-seat facility. The stadium was finished in 1939, and is now named after Brown. The pinnacle of Brown's career at Massillon was a victory in the 1940 season against Toledo's Waite High School. The Tigers and Waite both went undefeated in the 1939 season, and both claimed the state championship. The teams decided to settle the score the following year, and Brown's team won 28–0. The Massillon 1940 squad is still regarded by historians as one of the best in the history of state high school football. In a pre-season scrimmage, the Massillon Tigers played the Kent State University Golden Flashes, and defeated the older college team 47–0.

During his nine years at Massillon, Brown invented the playbook, a detailed listing of formations and set plays, and tested his players on their knowledge of it. He also originated the practice of sending in plays to his quarterback from the sideline using hand signals. His overall record at the school was 80–8–2, including a 35-game winning streak. Between 1935 and 1940, the team won the state football championship five times and won the High School Football National Championship four times, outscoring opponents by 2,393 points to 168 over that span. After the early losses to Canton, the Tigers beat the Bulldogs six straight times.

Brown's legacy in Massillon is still honored to this day: the Tiger teams wear his initials on the front shoulder of their uniforms, and a portrait of Brown is permanently displayed on the scoreboard of Paul Brown Tiger Stadium.

== College and military career ==
=== Ohio State Buckeyes ===
Brown's success at Massillon raised his profile in Ohio considerably; people started calling him the "Miracle Man of Massillon." When Ohio State was looking for a new coach in 1940 – Francis Schmidt left after losing to the rival Michigan Wolverines three times in a row – Brown was a candidate for the job. Ohio State officials were skeptical about the 33-year-old making the transition to college football but were worried that they might lose talented high school recruits loyal to Brown if they did not sign him.

Ohio State offered Brown a $6,500 salary ($140,000 in 2025 dollars), about $1,500 above his Massillon pay. He accepted in January 1941 and immediately began to institute his rigorous system. Players were drilled and quizzed, and Brown focused on preparing the freshmen to take starting roles as graduating seniors left. He conditioned his players to emphasize quickness, adopting the 40-yard dash as a measure of speed because that was the distance players needed to run to cover a punt.

Brown's first year at Ohio State was a success. The Buckeyes won six of eight games in 1941; the only loss was to Northwestern University and its star quarterback, Otto Graham. The final game of the season was a 20–20 tie with Michigan, which the school's supporters saw as a good outcome given that Ohio State was a heavy underdog. The Buckeyes tied for second place in the Western Conference, a grouping of college teams from the Midwestern United States (now known as the Big Ten), and finished 13th in the AP Poll. Brown was fourth in balloting for national Coach of the Year.

Japan's attack on Pearl Harbor on December 7, 1941, threatened to derail the 1942 season, but most college teams played on, adjusting schedules to include military teams composed of players serving in the military. The Buckeyes opened the season by beating a Fort Knox team 59–0, followed by two more wins against Southern California and Indiana University. In the first AP Poll of the season, Ohio State was ranked best in the nation, the first time the school had achieved that mark. The 1942 team was the first composed mainly of players hand-picked by Brown, including Bill Willis, Dante Lavelli and star halfback Les Horvath. In the middle of the season, the Buckeyes lost to the University of Wisconsin after numerous players drank bad water and got sick. That was the team's only loss of the season, which culminated with a 21–7 victory over Michigan. The Buckeyes won the Western Conference and claimed their first-ever national title after finishing the season at the top of the AP Poll.

The 1943 season was a disaster for Brown and the Buckeyes. Depleted by the military draft and facing tough competition from teams on Army and Navy bases, Brown was forced to play 17-year-old recruits who had not yet enlisted. Ohio State had affiliated itself with the Army Specialized Training Program, which did not allow its trainees to participate in varsity sports, while schools such as Michigan and Purdue became part of the Navy's V-12 training program, which did. The Buckeyes ended with a 3–6 record. In three seasons at Ohio State, Brown amassed an 18–8–1 record.

=== Great Lakes Bluejackets ===
Brown was classified 1-A in 1944 and commissioned as a lieutenant in the U.S. Navy. He served at the Great Lakes Naval Training Station outside Chicago as head coach of its Bluejacket football team, which competed against other service teams and college programs. The station was a waypoint for Navy recruits between training and active service in World War II, but its commanders took athletics seriously and saw winning as a morale-booster and a point of personal pride. Brown could have been called up for active duty – Tony Hinkle, his predecessor, was already serving in the Pacific – but the war began to wind down as Brown arrived. Brown had little time to institute his system, and instead adopted Hinkle's offensive scheme, borrowed from the Chicago Bears. He had a smattering of talented players, including defensive end George Young and halfback Ara Parseghian. In 1944, the team lost to Ohio State and Notre Dame, but finished with a 9–2–1 record and was among the top 20 teams in the AP Poll.

In September 1944, Arch Ward, the influential sports editor of the Chicago Tribune, proposed a new eight-team professional football league called the All-America Football Conference (AAFC) to compete against the more established National Football League (NFL) once the war was over. Ward lined up wealthy owners for the new league, which included teams in Los Angeles, New York City, San Francisco and Cleveland. Arthur B. "Mickey" McBride, a taxi-cab magnate who made a fortune in the newspaper business, was the owner of the Cleveland franchise. As Brown was preparing for the 1945 Bluejackets season, Ward came on McBride's behalf to ask Brown if he wanted to coach the new team. McBride offered $17,500 a year ($310,000 in today's dollars) – more than any coach at any level at the time. McBride also granted Brown full authority over football matters. He also received a stake in the team and a stipend while he was still in the military.

On February 8, 1945, Brown accepted the job, saying he was sad to leave Ohio State, but he "couldn't turn down this deal in fairness to my family." Brown was still Ohio State's head coach in absentia, and the decision surprised and outraged school officials who expected him to return after the war. The AAFC did not start play until after the war, however, and Brown continued to get ready for the 1945 season at Great Lakes. That year, many of his best players were transferred to bases on the West Coast as the focus of the war shifted to the Pacific. The team started with a 0–4–1 record, but rattled off six straight wins after the war ended and players returned from service overseas. Within weeks of Brown's final Bluejackets game, a 39–7 victory over Notre Dame, he set off for his new job in Cleveland.

== Professional coaching career ==
=== Cleveland Browns in the AAFC (1946–1949) ===
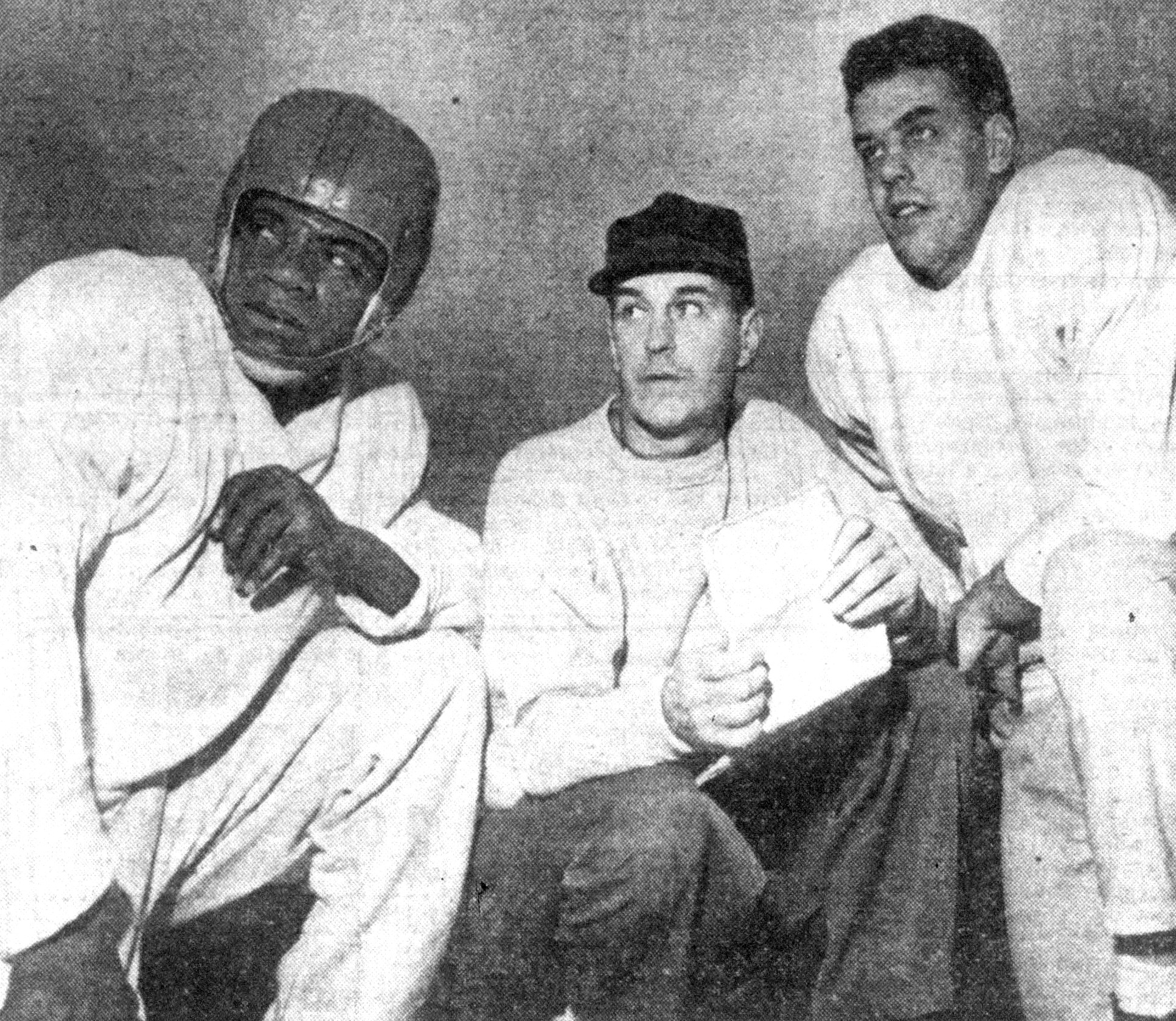
Bill Willis (left), Brown, and Otto Graham (right)

By the time Brown arrived in Cleveland, the team had signed a number of players to its roster, including quarterback Otto Graham, whose Northwestern squad had beaten the Buckeyes in 1941. Many of the players came from Ohio State, Great Lakes and Massillon teams that Brown coached. Lou Groza, a placekicker and tackle, played for Brown at Ohio State before the war intervened. Receiver Dante Lavelli was a sophomore on Ohio State's championship-winning team in 1942. Bill Willis, a defensive lineman whom Brown coached at Ohio State, and Marion Motley, a running back who grew up in Canton and played for Brown at Great Lakes, became two of the first black athletes to play professional football when they joined the team in 1946. Other signings included receiver Mac Speedie, center Frank Gatski and back Edgar "Special Delivery" Jones. Brown brought in assistants including Blanton Collier, who had been stationed at Great Lakes and met Brown at Bluejackets practices.

The name of the team was at first left up to Brown, who rejected calls for it to be christened the Browns in his honor. McBride then held a contest to name the team in May 1945, which yielded the name "Panthers," which had previously been used by an earlier team that had played in Cleveland in the 1920s. However, the nickname was scrapped soon afterward. Depending on the source, Brown rejected it after learning that the Panthers had failed (according to this version, Brown said, "That old Panthers team failed. I want no part of that name."), or McBride balked at paying the owner of the original Panthers for the rights to use the name. Whatever the case, in August, McBride gave in to popular demand and christened the team the Browns, despite Paul Brown's objections.

For years, however, Brown claimed that the second name-the-team contest yielded the name "Brown Bombers," after then-world heavyweight boxing champion Joe Louis, whose nickname was "The Brown Bomber." According to this version, when Brown rejected the nickname "Panthers," he decided that the team needed a nickname befitting a champion, and felt the nickname "Brown Bombers" was appropriate. The name was reportedly shortened to simply "Browns." This alternate history of the name was even supported by the team as being factual as recently as the mid-1990s, and it continues as an urban legend to this day. However, Paul Brown never held fast to the Joe Louis story, and later in his life admitted that it was false, invented to deflect unwanted attention arising from the team being named after him. The Browns and the NFL now both support the position that the team was indeed named after Paul Brown.

With the roster fixed and the team's name chosen, Brown set out to build a dynasty. "I want to be what the New York Yankees are in baseball or Ben Hogan is in golf", he said.

After a training camp at Bowling Green State University, the Browns played their first game in September 1946 at Cleveland Stadium. A crowd of 60,135 people showed up to see the Browns beat the Miami Seahawks 44–0, then a record attendance mark for professional football. That touched off a string of wins; the team ended the season with a 12–2 record and the top spot in the AAFC's western division. The Browns then beat the AAFC's New York Yankees in the championship.

Cleveland won the AAFC championship again in 1947 behind an offensive attack that employed the forward pass more frequently and effectively than was typical at the time. The Browns' offensive success was driven by Brown's version of the T formation, which was gradually replacing the single-wing formation as football's most popular and effective scheme.

The Browns won every game in the 1948 season, a feat that went unmatched until the Miami Dolphins (coached by Brown disciple Don Shula) did it in 1972. Cleveland then won the AAFC championship for the fourth time in a row in 1949. By then, however, the league was struggling for survival, due in part to the Browns' dominance. Attendance at games dwindled in 1948 and 1949 as fans lost interest in lopsided victories, and at the end of the 1949 season the AAFC dissolved. Three of its teams, the San Francisco 49ers, the Baltimore Colts and the Browns, merged into the NFL. The Browns picked up a few good former AAFC players from other teams, including offensive guard Abe Gibron and defensive end Len Ford, but some observers saw Brown's team as the lone standout in an otherwise minor league.

=== Cleveland Browns in the NFL (1950–1955) ===
Brown on the sideline in 1952 in the driving rain

The Browns' first game in the NFL in 1950 was against the two-time defending champion Philadelphia Eagles in Philadelphia. They won the game 35–10, the first of 10 victories that year. After beating the New York Giants in a playoff game, the Browns went on to win the championship game against the Los Angeles Rams on a last-minute field goal by Groza. "The flag of the late lamented AAFC flies high, and Paul Brown has the last laugh", the Plain Dealer's editorial page proclaimed. Brown said his was "the greatest football team a coach ever had, and there was never a game like this one." In 16 seasons, Brown had led his teams to 12 championships. He was the first head coach to win both a college and NFL championship, a feat not repeated until Jimmy Johnson accomplished it in the 1990s.

As the Browns climbed to the top of the NFL, speculation began to mount that Brown might return to the Buckeyes. Wes Fesler had resigned as the team's coach, and Brown was seen as a possible replacement. But Brown had also alienated many Ohio State alumni by failing to return to the school after World War II and for signing away players including Groza before their college eligibility expired. He interviewed with the university's athletic board on January 27, 1951, but the board unanimously rejected Brown in favor of Woody Hayes, who was unanimously endorsed by the board of trustees.

The Browns reached the championship each of the next three years, but lost all of those games. In both 1952 and 1953, Cleveland lost championships to the Detroit Lions, who were then on the rise after decades of mediocrity. Before the 1953 season, McBride sold the team to a group of local businessmen led by David Jones for $600,000 ($7.2 million in 2025 dollars). While Brown was upset that McBride did not consult him about the deal, the new owners said they would stay out of the picture and let Brown run the team. Brown saw this as a crucial issue: he felt he needed full control over personnel decisions and coaching to make his system work.

Graham announced in 1953 that the following season would be his last. But the team won the championship in 1954 in a rematch against the Lions, and Brown convinced Graham to come back. Cleveland finished 1955 with a 9–2–1 record, reaching the championship game again. The Browns beat the Rams for their second straight championship, and Graham retired after the season.

=== Later years in Cleveland (1956–1963) ===
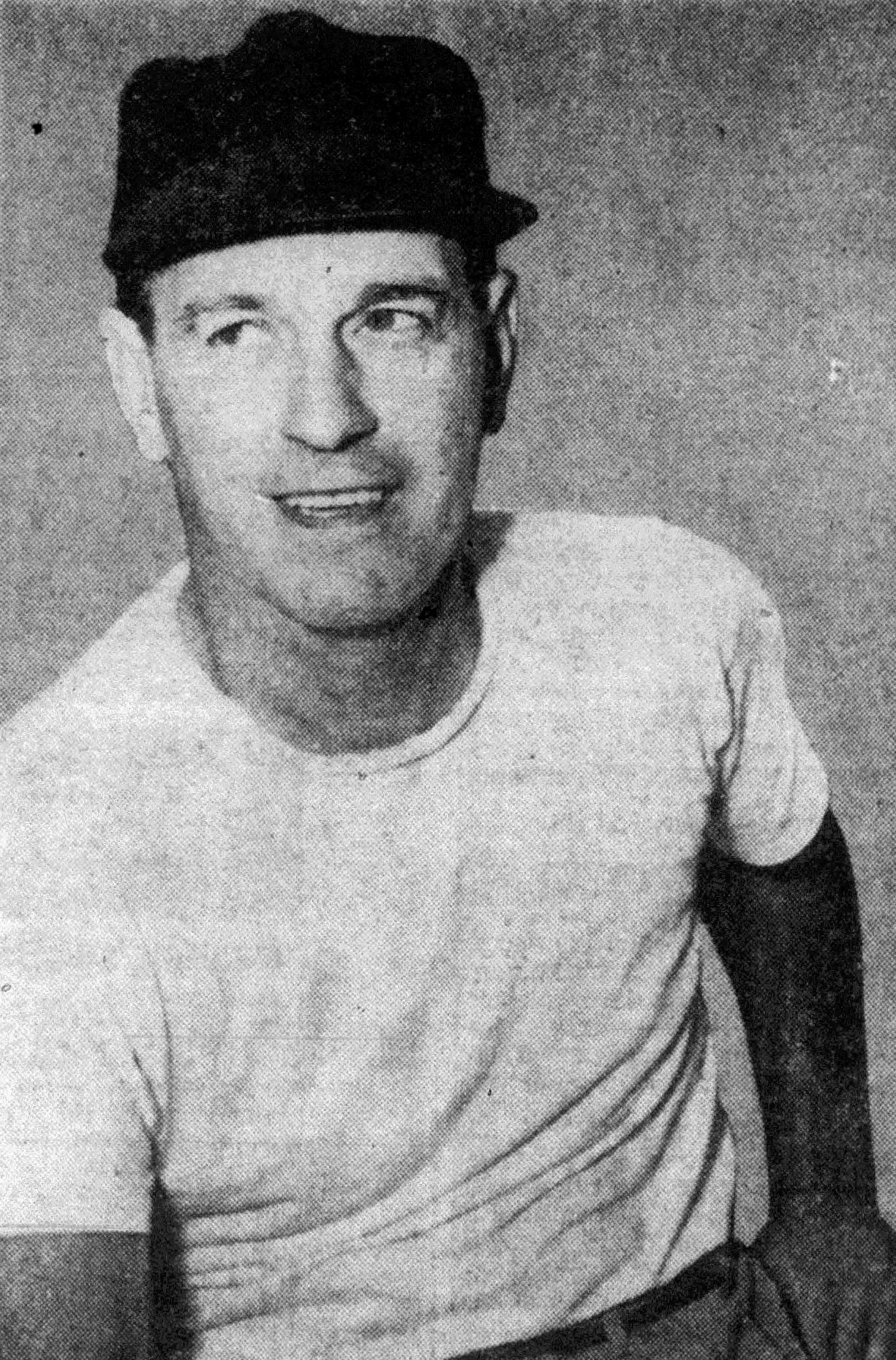
Brown in 1951

With Graham gone and the quarterback situation in flux, the Browns ended 1956 with a 5–7 record, Paul Brown's first losing season as a professional coach. In the next year's draft, the team selected Jim Brown out of Syracuse University. As television began to help football leapfrog baseball as America's most popular sport, Jim Brown became a larger-than-life personality. He was handsome and charismatic in private and dominant on the field. Paul Brown, however, was critical of some aspects of Jim Brown's game, including his disinclination to block. In Jim Brown's first season, the team reached the championship game, again against the Lions, but lost 59–14. The Browns did not contend for the championship in the following two years, when a Baltimore Colts team coached by Brown's former protégé Weeb Ewbank won a pair of titles.

As Jim Brown's star rose, players began to question Paul Brown's leadership and play-calling in the late 1950s. The skepticism came to a head in a game against the Giants at the end of the 1958 season in which a win or tie would have given the Browns a spot in the championship game against Ewbank's Colts. In the third quarter, the Browns drove to New York's 16-yard line with a 10–3 lead and lined up for a field goal. But Coach Brown called a timeout before Groza could make the try, which alerted the Giants to a possible fake kick. Brown indeed called a fake, and the holder stumbled as he got up to throw, ruining the play. The Giants came back to win the game by a field goal, defeated the Browns 10–0 in a playoff for the Eastern Conference title and reached the championship, while the Browns went home without a spot in the title game for the second year in a row.

Paul Brown blamed the struggles on quarterback Milt Plum, whom the team had drafted in 1957, saying the Browns had "lost faith in Plum's ability to play under stress." In truth, the players were instead losing faith in Paul Brown and his autocratic coaching style. Jim Brown started a weekly radio show, which Paul Brown did not like; it undercut his control over the team and its message. But the coach found it hard to question Jim Brown given his feats on the field, and the tension between the two men grew. The team finished second in its division in 1959 and 1960, even as Jim Brown racked up league-leading seasons in rushing.

Art Modell, a New York advertising executive, bought the team in 1961 for $4.1 million ($44 million today). Modell, who was 35 years old at the time, bought out Brown's 15% stake in the team for $500,000 and gave Brown a new eight-year contract. He said he and Brown would have a "working partnership". To Brown's chagrin, Modell took a very active role in team operations. In contrast, McBride and Jones had given Brown a free hand in football matters. Modell, who was single and only a few years older than most players, started to listen to their concerns about the coach. He became particularly close to Jim Brown, calling him "my senior partner". Modell sat in the press box during games and could be overheard second-guessing Paul Brown's play-calling, which drove a deeper wedge between the two men. At that time, Brown was the only coach who insisted on calling every offensive play, making use of rotating guards to ferry coaching instructions. Quarterback audibles to change the play at the line of scrimmage in response to defensive positioning were not permitted. When Plum openly questioned Paul Brown's absolute control over play-calling, he was traded to Detroit.

The conflict between Brown and Modell reached a breaking point when Brown traded star halfback Bobby Mitchell for the rights to Ernie Davis, a Heisman Trophy-winning running back who broke all of Jim Brown's rushing records at Syracuse. Paul Brown did not inform Modell of the move, and Modell only heard about it after getting a call from Washington Redskins owner George Preston Marshall. Davis, however, was diagnosed with leukemia before the 1962 season. He came to Cleveland to train after the cancer went into remission, but Brown would not allow him to play. Modell, however, wanted to give Davis a chance to play before he succumbed to the disease. Ultimately, the relationship between coach and owner was never repaired, and Ernie Davis never played in a professional game, dying on May 18, 1963.

=== Departure from Cleveland ===
As the rift between the players and Brown and between Modell and Brown grew, Modell fired Brown on January 7, 1963. A controversy developed over the timing of the decision amid a local newspaper strike, which limited discussion of the move. A printing company executive, however, got together a group of sportswriters and published a 32-page magazine fielding players' views on the firing. Opinions were mixed; Modell came in for his share of criticism, but tackle and team captain Mike McCormack said he did not think the team could win under Brown. Blanton Collier, Brown's longtime assistant, was named the team's new head coach. Brown remained with the team as vice president and continued to receive an $82,500 salary under his eight-year contract, though the position had no true power in what he told The New York Times was a "vice president in charge of I-don't-know-what."

Brown reportedly wished to purchase the Eagles, who were put on sale by the Happy Hundred on April 19, and he led a group of investors that offered $4.5 million. Modell supported his effort regardless of their dispute, telling the Associated Press that he would "not stand in [Brown's] way if he wants to buy the Eagles." Despite his success in Cleveland, the news drew mixed reaction from Philadelphians as opponents saw little reason to replace the current front office or were hesitant to see an "outsider" owning their team. By May, however, Brown had lost interest in the bid, and an article from The Plain Dealer claimed it "remains doubtful whether Brown ever seriously considered purchasing the Eagles" and that "no attempt was made to put together a group and he hasn't visited Philadelphia since the Browns took a licking there last fall."

Out of football for the first time since 1930, Brown spent the next five years away from the sidelines, never once attending a Browns contest. As the team's vice president, he spoke little to Modell, only briefly doing so in 1963 to discuss scouting; Modell explained in 1964 that he did not order Brown to carry out any major responsibilities as it "would have been ludicrous to give a man of his stature piddling assignments." While he was secure financially, Brown's frustration grew with each passing year. "It was terrible", he later recalled. "I had everything a man could want: leisure, enough money, a wonderful family. Yet with all that, I was eating my heart out." Because Brown was still receiving his annual salary and liked to play golf, it was said that the only two people who made more money playing golf were Arnold Palmer and Jack Nicklaus.

Brown explored coaching possibilities, but he was mindful not to put himself in a position where his control might be challenged as it had been in Cleveland. In 1963, the Titans of New York of the American Football League (AFL) offered him the head coach job for $50,000 but failed.

=== Cincinnati Bengals ===
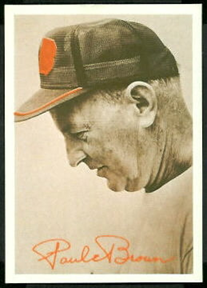
1969 Tresler Comet card of Brown with the Cincinnati Bengals

Four years later, the AFL, which had formed to compete against the NFL and had recently reached a deal to merge into the older league, put a new franchise in Cincinnati. Brown joined the ownership group. While he had the third-largest stake in the team, he was the public face of the ownership group. He became general manager and head coach, with complete control over the football side of the operation. He was also given the right to represent the team in all league matters, a key element of control for him.

Brown called his new franchise the Bengals because Cincinnati had a team of that name in the 1930s and he thought it would provide a link to the past. Brown's son Mike joined the front office and became his father's top assistant and right-hand man. Brown brought in other assistants including Bill Johnson, Rick Forzano and Bill Walsh. In their first two seasons in 1968 and 1969, the Bengals fared poorly, but the team appeared to be on the upswing as Brown built up a core group of players through the draft, including quarterback Greg Cook.

The Bengals entered the NFL in 1970 as a result of the AFL–NFL merger and were placed in the newly formed American Football Conference alongside the Browns. A career-ending injury to Cook before the 1970 season forced the Bengals to rely on Virgil Carter, an emergency backup who could make accurate short passes but could not throw the ball deep like Cook once could. Brown and Walsh went to work designing an offense around Carter's limitations, a scheme that was the genesis of the West Coast offense Walsh later used to great effect when he became coach of the San Francisco 49ers.

The Bengals lost their first meeting with the Browns 30–27 in 1970, and Brown was booed when he did not come on the field to shake Collier's hand after the game. "I haven't shaken the other coach's hands after a game for years", Brown explained. "... I went up to him before the game, and we did our socializing then." The Bengals beat the Browns later in the season. Brown called it "my greatest victory."

As the Bengals' head coach, Brown took the team to the playoffs three times including 1970. Despite finding a franchise quarterback in Ken Anderson, Brown's team never got past the first round of the postseason tournament. Four days after the Bengals were eliminated from the playoffs in 1975, Brown announced he was retiring after 45 years of coaching. The game had changed dramatically during his time in the NFL, growing from America's second sport to the country's biggest and most lucrative pastime. Brown was 67 years old.

== Later life and death ==
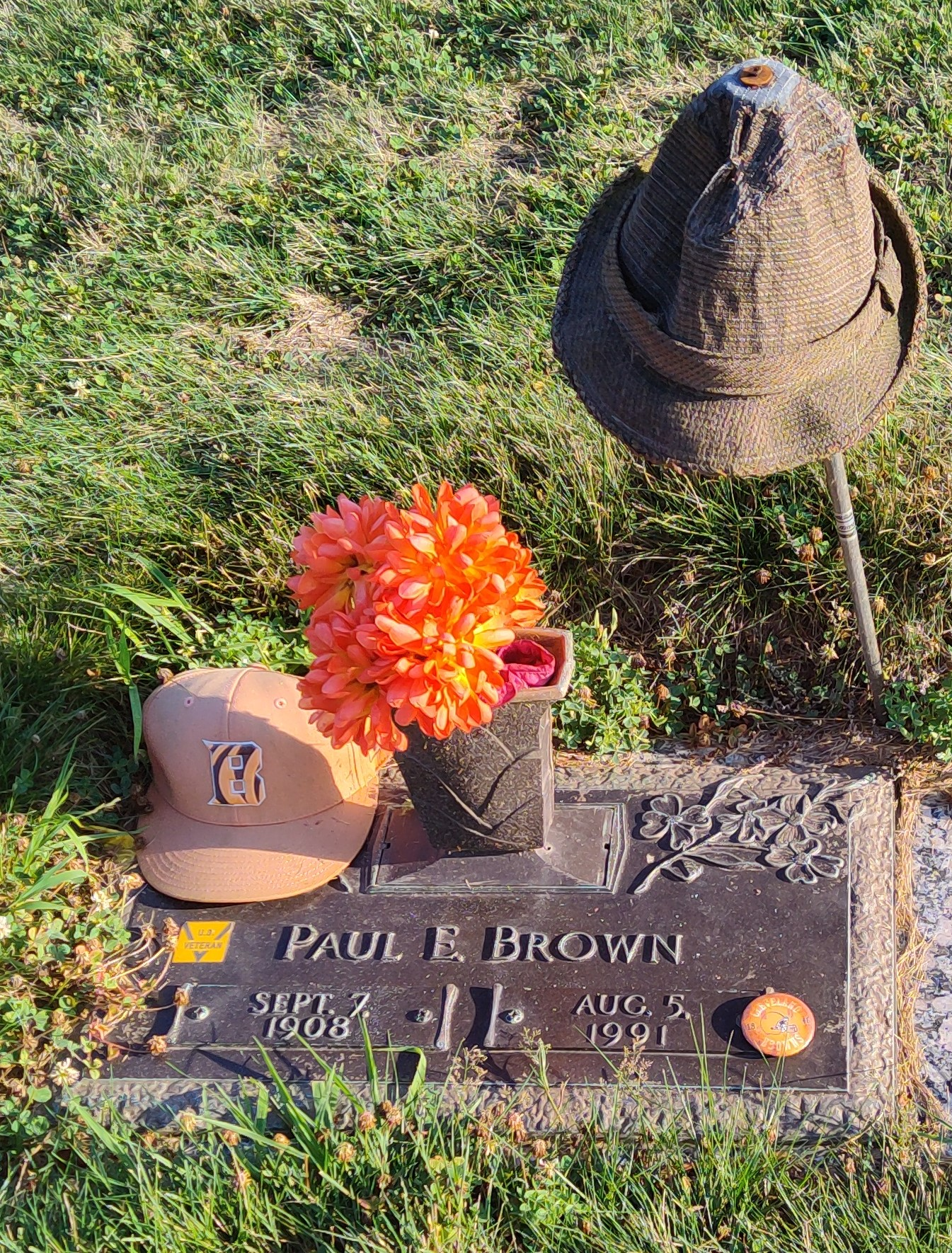
The grave marker of Paul Brown in Rose Hill Memorial Park, Massillon, Ohio

Bill Walsh was passed over in favor of Bill "Tiger" Johnson for the head coaching job when Brown retired. In a 2006 interview, Walsh said Brown worked against his candidacy to be a head coach anywhere in the league. "All the way through I had opportunities, and I never knew about them", Walsh said. "And then when I left him, he called whoever he thought was necessary to keep me out of the NFL." Brown stayed on as team president after stepping down as head coach, and the Bengals later made two trips to the Super Bowl, losing both games to Walsh and the 49ers. He rarely appeared in public, however. He died on August 5, 1991, at home from complications of pneumonia.

Brown and Katie had three sons: Robin, Mike and Pete. Following Katie's death of a heart attack in 1969, he married his former secretary Mary Rightsell in 1973. His son Robin died of cancer in 1978. Brown is buried at Rose Hill Cemetery in Massillon.

Brown was succeeded by his son Mike as Bengals' team president. Subsequently, in 2000, Cincinnati opened a new football facility on the Ohio River, naming it Paul Brown Stadium, a name it would keep until 2022. Brown was inducted in 1967 to the Pro Football Hall of Fame. "I feel he's as fine a coach as the game ever has had", Otto Graham said at the induction ceremony. "I used to cuss him out and complain but now I'm happy that I played under him." In 2009, Sporting News named Brown as the 12th greatest coach of all time; only two other NFL coaches were listed above him.

== Legacy ==
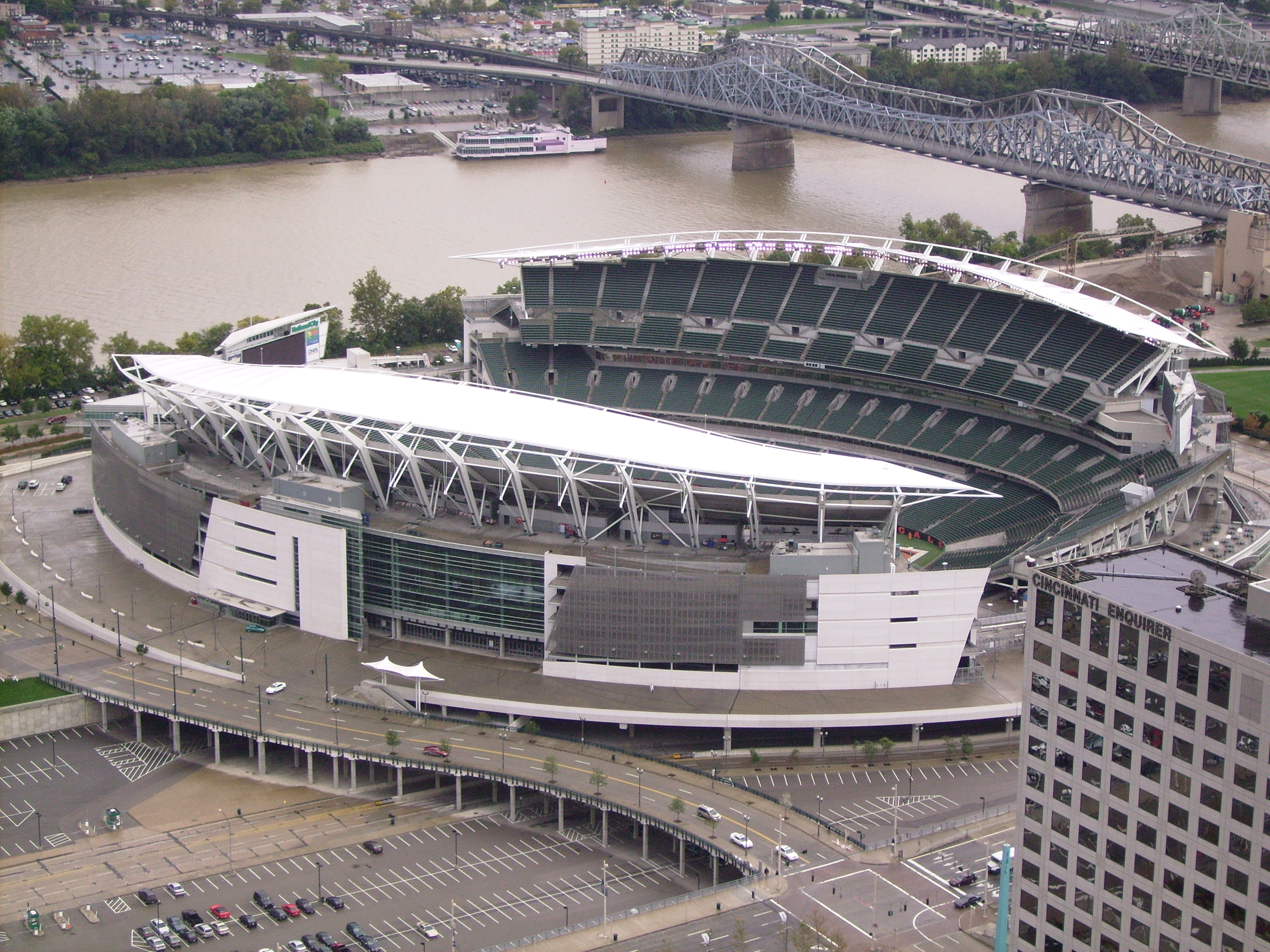
The Bengals' stadium was named after Paul Brown from 2000 to 2022.

Although Brown coached dozens of successful teams at the high school, college and professional levels, his controlling personality and sharp criticisms made him unpopular with many players. Brown was a methodical and disciplined coach who tolerated no deviation from his system. His professional teams' planes did not wait for players who were late; anyone who missed the flight was forced to find one on his own and pay a fine to Brown. When the Browns practiced twice in a day in training camp, each session was exactly 55 minutes. Regular practices during the season lasted an hour and 12 minutes. Players who made mistakes in games were held up for ridicule during film review sessions. "There got to be a saying", longtime Browns safety Ken Konz said years later. "'There's a right way, a wrong way and the Paul Brown way.' If you did it the Paul Brown way, you were right. He was a very strict coach, and he expected you to toe the line."

Brown was also a tough negotiator over salaries, often refusing to give players raises despite strong performance. He was called "cold and brutal" by sportswriters, and told players to be "ready to fight for your financial lives". "When I signed with Paul, he felt that $1,000 was $10 million", said Gene Hickerson, a guard who played for the Browns in the late 1950s and 1960s. Brown's stingy approach to salaries frustrated his players and was a motivating force behind the formation of the National Football League Players Association, which represents players' interests in dealings with the league. Browns players including Dante Lavelli and Abe Gibron helped found the union in 1956 along with lawyer and former Browns assistant coach Creighton Miller. Brown was so annoyed by the union that he had a 1946 team photo in his office touched up to remove Miller.

Brown's acrimonious departure from Cleveland was another source of criticism. His teams' winning ways had helped obscure his harsh methods and need for control, but Modell's active involvement in the team exposed them. Despite that Modell owned the team, Brown refused to cede any authority or be diplomatic in his relationship with Modell. Modell felt Brown was unwilling to adapt to the way football was played in the early 1960s. Many players from that time agreed. "Paul didn't adjust to the changes in the game", former Browns cornerback Bernie Parrish said in 1997. "By 1962, he was more worried about protecting his reputation as the Greatest Coach Who Ever Lived than he was about winning a title. ... By the end of the 1962 season, a lot of us wanted to be traded because we were convinced that we'd never win a title with Paul Brown – and we never believed Paul Brown was going anywhere." After his firing, Brown held a grudge against Modell for the rest of his life. He never forgave Collier for taking over as coach when he left, even though Collier had asked for and received his blessing.

Although he was criticized for his autocratic coaching style and strained relationships, Brown played a significant role in the evolution and modernization of football. The draw play he invented – a formation in which the quarterback drops back to pass but then hands off the ball to a running back – is still in wide use. In his autobiography, Brown said the play came about by accident in 1946 when Graham botched a play and improvised by making a late handoff to Marion Motley, who ran past the onrushing defenders for a large gain. He developed detailed passing patterns that were designed to exploit vulnerabilities in the defense. Brown is also credited with the creation of the passer's pocket, an offensive line protection scheme that is designed to buy a quarterback a few extra seconds to find the open receiver.

Brown's main contribution to the game, however, was not to the development of new plays but to the organization and administration of teams. Before Brown, football was seen as a chaotic affair where winning was a product mostly of physical prowess. Few coaches took strategy and preparation seriously. Brown, by contrast, hired a full-time staff of assistants, tested his players on their intelligence and their knowledge of plays, instituted strict organization of practices and analyzed game film to get an edge on opponents. Brown created a detailed system for scouting college talent as a means to improve the Browns' college draft.

The success of this systematic approach forced other teams to follow. Most of Brown's organizational innovations are still in use today. "No one, I mean no one, has ever had total command and respect like Paul Brown", Paul Wiggin, a former Browns defensive end, said in 1997. "I believe that Paul Brown could have been a general in the Army ... you put Paul Brown in charge of anything and he would have been one of those special people who could organize and lead."

Brown's approach influenced future generations of coaches down to the present day. Men he worked directly with, including Don Shula, Weeb Ewbank, Chuck Noll and Bill Walsh, all adopted his system to some degree.

Brown was more than just a coach. He was a student of the game who had much to do with making professional football the attraction it is today. He made coaching a full-time job for himself and all his assistants. Others had to follow suit or fall behind. So they did the logical thing—they copied his methods, both as a coach and innovator. ..."Paul Brown didn't invent the game of football. He was just the first to take it seriously", declared Sport Magazine in a December 1986 story ... Sid Gillman, Brown's coaching contemporary for many years in the NFL, told the magazine he always felt that "before Paul Brown pro football was a 'daisy chain.' He brought a system into pro football. He brought a practice routine. He broke down practice into individual areas. He had position coaches. He was an organizational genius. Before Paul Brown, coaches just rolled the ball out on the practice field."

— Chuck Heaton, Plain Dealer sportswriter

While Brown's tenure in Cleveland ended in bitterness, the coach was a prolific innovator with the team. One factor in Brown's success was his decision to hire a full-time staff of dedicated position coaches, a break from the norm in an era when most assistants took second jobs in the offseason to make ends meet. Brown also invented the practice squad, known in that era as the taxi squad, a group of promising players who did not make the roster but were kept on reserve. Team owner Mickey McBride put them on the payroll of his taxi company, although they did not drive cabs.

Classroom teaching was a fixture of Paul Brown's strict approach to coaching. Players were not allowed to drink, smoke in public or have sex after Tuesday night during the regular season.

Brown sat his players down in classrooms and relentlessly tested them on their knowledge of the playbook, requiring them to copy down every play in a separate notebook for better retention. He was a terse man, and his criticisms of players were often withering and ruthless. He prohibited players from drinking, told them not to smoke in public, and made coats and ties mandatory on road trips. They were not to have sex after Tuesday night during the season. According to Pat Summerall, Brown once traded a player, future Hall-of-Famer Doug Atkins, for burping out loud during a team meeting.

He was the first coach to use intelligence tests to evaluate players, scout opponents using game films and call plays for his quarterback using guards as messengers. He invented the draw play and helped develop the modern face mask after Len Ford and Otto Graham suffered facial injuries. Although critical of Brown's coaching, Jim Brown said he integrated football in the right way:

Paul Brown integrated pro football without uttering a single word about integration. He just went out, signed a bunch of great black athletes, and started kicking butt. That's how you do it. You don't talk about it. Paul never said one word about race. But this was a time in sports when you'd play in some cities and the white players could stay at the nice hotel, but the blacks had to stay in the homes of some black families in town. But not with Paul. We always stayed in hotels that took the entire team. Again, he never said a word. But in his own way, the man integrated football the right way – and no one was going to stop him.

The Bengals stadium was named in his honor until 2022. He was a member of the Bengals' inaugural Ring of Honor class in 2021.

== Coaching tree ==
Assistants under Paul Brown who became college or professional head coaches:

- Blanton Collier: Kentucky (1954–1961), Cleveland Browns (1963–1970)
- Weeb Ewbank: Washington University (1947–1948), Baltimore Colts (1954–1962), New York Jets (1963–1973)
- Bill Johnson: Cincinnati Bengals (1976–1978)
- Chuck Studley: Houston Oilers (1983)
- Bill Walsh: Stanford Cardinal football (1977–1978), (1992–1994), San Francisco 49ers (1979–1988)

== Head coaching record ==
=== High school ===
Year	School	Record	Titles
1930	Severn School Prep Admirals	7–0–0	Maryland State Champions
1931	Severn School Prep Admirals	5–2–1	
1932	Massillon Washington HS Tigers	5–4–1	
1933	Massillon Washington HS Tigers	8–2–0	
1934	Massillon Washington HS Tigers	9–1–0	
1935	Massillon Washington HS Tigers	10–0–0	National Champions, Ohio State Champions
1936	Massillon Washington HS Tigers	10–0–0	National Champions, Ohio State Champions
1937	Massillon Washington HS Tigers	8–1–1	
1938	Massillon Washington HS Tigers	10–0–0	Ohio State Champions
1939	Massillon Washington HS Tigers	10–0–0	National Champions, Ohio State Champions
1940	Massillon Washington HS Tigers	10–0–0	National Champions, Ohio State Champions
	Overall High School Record	92–10–3	4 National Titles, 6 State Titles

=== College ===
Year	Team	Overall	Conference	Standing	Bowl/playoffs	AP^{#}
Ohio State Buckeyes (Big Ten Conference) (1941–1943)
1941	Ohio State	6–1–1	3–1–1	T–2nd		13
1942	Ohio State	9–1	5–1	1st		1
1943	Ohio State	3–6	1–4	7th		
Ohio State:		18–8–1	9–6–1			
Great Lakes Navy Bluejackets (Independent) (1944–1945)
1944	Great Lakes Navy	9–2–1				17
1945	Great Lakes Navy	6–4–1				
Great Lakes Navy:		15–5–2				
Total:		33–13–3				
National championship Conference title Conference division title or championship game berth
^{#}Rankings from final AP Poll. Source: College Football Data Warehouse.

=== Professional ===
Team	Year	Regular season					Postseason			
Team	Year	Won	Lost	Ties	Win %	Finish	Won	Lost	Win %	Result
CLE	1946	12	2	0	85.7	1st in AAFC Western Conference	1	0	100.0	Beat New York Yankees in AAFC championship game
CLE	1947	12	1	1	89.2	1st in AAFC Western Conference	1	0	100.0	Beat New York Yankees in AAFC championship game
CLE	1948	14	0	0	100.0	1st in AAFC Western Conference	1	0	100.0	Beat Buffalo Bills in AAFC championship game
CLE	1949	9	1	2	83.3	1st in AAFC regular season	2	0	100.0	Beat Buffalo Bills in semifinals Beat San Francisco 49ers in AAFC championship game
CLE AAFC Total		47	4	3	89.8		5	0	100.0	
CLE	1950	10	2	0	83.3	1st-T in NFL Eastern Conference	2	0	100.0	Beat New York Giants in Eastern Conference tie-breaker Beat Los Angeles Rams in NFL Championship game
CLE	1951	11	1	0	91.7	1st in NFL Eastern Conference	0	1	0.0	Lost to Los Angeles Rams in NFL Championship game
CLE	1952	8	4	0	66.7	1st in NFL Eastern Conference	0	1	0.0	Lost to Detroit Lions in NFL Championship game
CLE	1953	11	1	0	91.7	1st in NFL Eastern Conference	0	1	0.0	Lost to Detroit Lions in NFL Championship game
CLE	1954	9	3	0	75.0	1st in NFL Eastern Conference	1	0	100.0	Beat Detroit Lions in NFL Championship game
CLE	1955	9	2	1	81.8	1st in NFL Eastern Conference	1	0	100.0	Beat Los Angeles Rams in NFL Championship game
CLE	1956	5	7	0	41.7	4th in NFL Eastern Conference	-	-	-	
CLE	1957	9	2	1	81.8	1st in NFL Eastern Conference	0	1	0.0	Lost to Detroit Lions in NFL Championship game
CLE	1958	9	3	0	75.0	1st-T in NFL Eastern Conference	0	1	0.0	Lost to New York Giants in Eastern conference tie-breaker
CLE	1959	7	5	0	58.3	2nd in NFL Eastern Conference	-	-	-	
CLE	1960	8	3	1	72.7	2nd in NFL Eastern Conference	-	-	-	
CLE	1961	8	5	1	61.5	3rd in NFL Eastern Conference	-	-	-	
CLE	1962	7	6	1	53.8	3rd in NFL Eastern Conference	-	-	-	
CLE NFL Total		111	44	5	70.9		4	5	44.4	
CIN	1968	3	11	0	21.4	5th in AFL West Division	-	-	-	
CIN	1969	4	9	1	30.8	5th in AFL West Division	-	-	-	
CIN AFL Total		7	20	1	26.8		-	-	-	
CIN	1970	8	6	0	57.1	1st in NFL AFC Central	0	1	0.0	Lost to Baltimore Colts in AFC Divisional Playoff
CIN	1971	4	10	0	28.6	4th in NFL AFC Central	-	-	-	
CIN	1972	8	6	0	57.1	3rd in NFL AFC Central	-	-	-	
CIN	1973	10	4	0	71.4	1st in NFL AFC Central	0	1	0.0	Lost to Miami Dolphins in AFC Divisional Playoff
CIN	1974	7	7	0	50.0	2nd in NFL AFC Central	-	-	-	
CIN	1975	11	3	0	78.6	2nd in NFL AFC Central	0	1	0.0	Lost to Oakland Raiders in AFC Divisional Playoff
CIN NFL Total		48	36	0	57.1		0	3	0.0	
Official NFL Total		159	80	5	66.5		4	8	33.3	
Professional Total		213	104	9	67.2		9	8	52.9	
Source: Pro-Football-Reference.com

== See also ==
- List of American Football League players
- List of NFL head coach wins leaders
- List of NFL head coaches by playoff record
- List of professional gridiron football coaches with 200 wins
