= Paul Brown Tiger Stadium =

High school football stadium in Massillon, Ohio

Coordinates: 40.793544°N 81.499746°W

- "P.B.T.S."
- Interactive map of Paul Brown Tiger Stadium
- Former names: Tiger Stadium (1939-1976)
- Location: 1 Paul E Brown Drive SE, Massillon, Ohio 44646
- Operator: Massillon Tigers Booster Club
- Capacity: 16,600
- Surface: Field Turf

Construction
- Groundbreaking: 1938
- Opened: 1939
- Cost: $246,000 US

Tenant
- Massillon Washington High School (OHSAA) (1939–present)

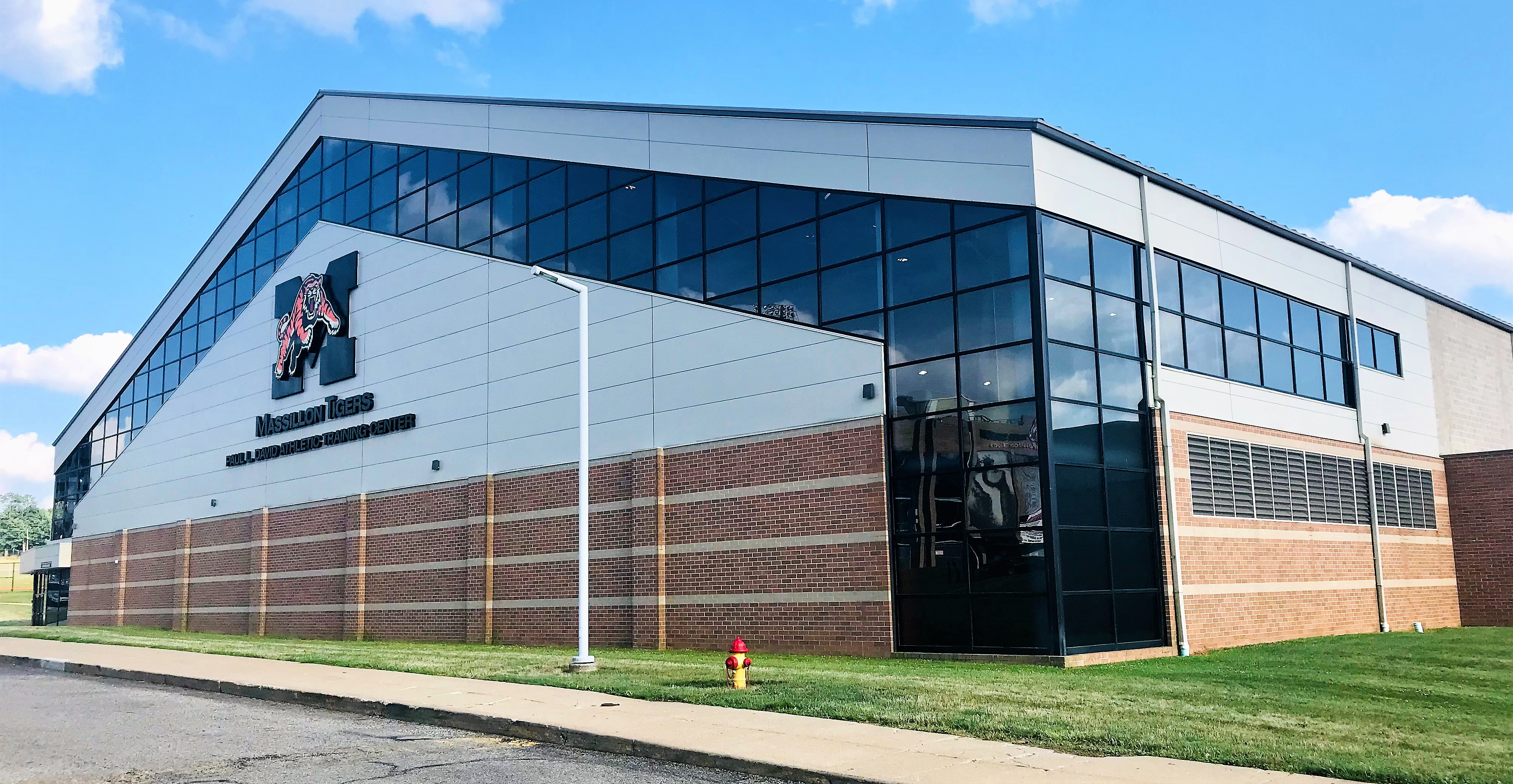
Paul L. David Athletic Center

Paul Brown Tiger Stadium is a high school football stadium located in Massillon, Ohio. It is primarily used for American football, and is the home field of the Massillon Washington High School Tigers football team. The stadium has a seating capacity of 16,600 spectators, with a maximum capacity of over 19,000 when extra seating is brought in. The stadium is named after former Tiger and noted football head coach, Paul Brown.

Originally named Tiger Stadium, its construction was completed in 1939 through the Works Progress Administration program. Besides being the regular season home of the Massillon Tiger Football team, the stadium hosts numerous OHSAA sanctioned football playoff games. The stadium also hosts the annual Pro Football Hall of Fame drum and bugle corps competition.

Paul Brown Tiger Stadium is listed as a historical site of significance by the State of Ohio.

== Paul L. David Athletic Center ==
The Paul L. David Athletic Training Center located next to Paul Brown Tiger Stadium was built in 2008 by local philanthropist Jeff David in honor of his late father as part of what was known as the D.R.E.A.M. project. The $3 million, 80,000-square-foot building is the largest indoor football practice facility in the state of Ohio, 20,000-square-feet larger than the facility used by the NFL's Cleveland Browns. It is also one of the few indoor practice facilities for a high school football team in the nation.
