= 78th Ohio Infantry Regiment =

- Active: October 1861 to July 11, 1865
- Country: United States
- Allegiance: Union
- Branch: Infantry
- Engagements: Battle of Fort Donelson; Battle of Shiloh; Siege of Corinth; Battle of Iuka; Battle of Port Gibson; Battle of Raymond; Battle of Jackson; Battle of Champion Hill; Siege of Vicksburg; Meridian Campaign; Atlanta campaign; Battle of Kennesaw Mountain; Battle of Atlanta; Siege of Atlanta; Battle of Jonesboro; Sherman's March to the Sea; Carolinas campaign; Battle of Bentonville

The 78th Ohio Infantry Regiment, sometimes 78th Ohio Volunteer Infantry (or 78th OVI) and the 78th Ohio Veteran Volunteer Infantry (or 78th OVVI), was an infantry regiment in the Union Army during the American Civil War.

== Service ==
The 78th Ohio Infantry was organized at Camp Gilbert in Zanesville, Ohio October 1861 through January 1862 and mustered in for three years service on January 11, 1862, under the command of Colonel Mortimer Dormer Leggett.

The regiment was attached to 2nd Brigade, 3rd Division, District of West Tennessee, to March 1862. 3rd Brigade, 3rd Division, Army of the Tennessee, to July 1862. Unattached, District of Jackson, Tennessee, to November 1862. 2nd Brigade, 3rd Division, Right Wing, XIII Corps, Department of the Tennessee, to December 1862. 2nd Brigade, 3rd Division, XVII Corps, Army of the Tennessee, to July 1865.

The 78th Ohio Infantry mustered out of service at Louisville, Kentucky, on July 11, 1865.

== Detailed service ==
Moved to Cincinnati, Ohio, then to Fort Donelson, Tenn., February 11–16. Capture of Fort Donelson, Tenn., February 16, 1862. Expedition toward Purdy and operations about Crump's Landing, Tenn., March 9–14. Battle of Shiloh, April 6–7. Advance on and siege of Corinth, Miss., April 29-May 30. Capture of Jackson June 7. Duty at Bethel and Grand Junction until August. Bolivar August 30. March to Iuka, Miss., September 1–19. Battle of Iuka September 19 (reserve). Duty at Bolivar until November. Grant's Central Mississippi Campaign, operations on the Mississippi Central Railroad. November 2, 1862, to January 20, 1863. Reconnaissance's from LaGrange toward Colliersville November 5 and November 8–9. Moved to Memphis, Tenn., January 20, then to Lake Providence, La., February 22, and to Milliken's Bend, La., April 17. Movement on Bruinsburg and turning Grand Gulf April 25–30. Battle of Port Gibson May 1. Forty Hills and Hankinson's Ferry May 3–4. Battles of Raymond May 12; Jackson May 14; Champion Hill May 16. Siege of Vicksburg, Miss., May 18-July 4. Assaults on Vicksburg May 19 and 22. Surrender of Vicksburg July 4, and duty there until February 1864. Clinton July 16. Expedition to Monroe, La., August 20-September 2, 1863. Expedition to Canton October 14–20. Bogue Chitto Creek October 17. Regiment reenlisted January 5, 1864. Meridian Campaign February 3-March 2, 1864. Baker's Creek February 5. Wyatt's February 13. Meridian February 14–15. Canton February 26. Veterans on furlough March and April. Moved to Clifton, Tenn., then marched to Ackworth, Ga., May 5-June 8. Atlanta Campaign June 8-September 8. Operations about Marietta and against Kennesaw Mountain June 10-July 2. Assault on Kennesaw June 27. Nickajack Creek July 2–5. Howell's Ferry July 5. Chattahoochie River July 5–17. Leggett's or Bald Hill July 20–21. Battle of Atlanta July 22. Siege of Atlanta July 22-August 25. Flank movement on Jonesboro August 25–30. Battle of Jonesboro August 31-September 1. Lovejoy's Station September 2–6. Duty near Atlanta until October 15. Moved to Chattanooga, Tenn., and duty guarding railroad near Chattanooga until November 13. Little River, Ala., October 27. March to the sea November 15-December 10. Siege of Savannah December 10–21. Campaign of the Carolinas January to April 1865. Pocotaligo, S.C., January 14. Barker's Mills, Whippy Swamp, February 3. Orangeburg February 12–13. Columbia February 16–17. Battle of Bentonville, N.C., March 20–21. Occupation of Goldsboro March 24. Advance on Raleigh April 10–14. Occupation of Raleigh April 14. Bennett's House April 26. Surrender of Johnston and his army. March to Washington, D.C., via Richmond, Va., April 29-May 20. Grand Review of the Armies May 24. Moved to Louisville, Ky., June.

== Casualties ==
The regiment lost a total of 355 men during service; 2 officers and 71 enlisted men killed or mortally wounded, 2 officers and 280 enlisted men died of disease.

== Commanders ==
- Colonel Mortimer Dormer Leggett - promoted to Brigadier General, November 29, 1862
- Colonel Zachariah M. Chandler - discharged July 23, 1863
- Colonel Greenbury F. Wiles - Brevet Brigadier General, March 13, 1865; mustered out with regiment, July 11, 1865 (commanded at Battle of Champion Hill and Siege of Vicksburg)
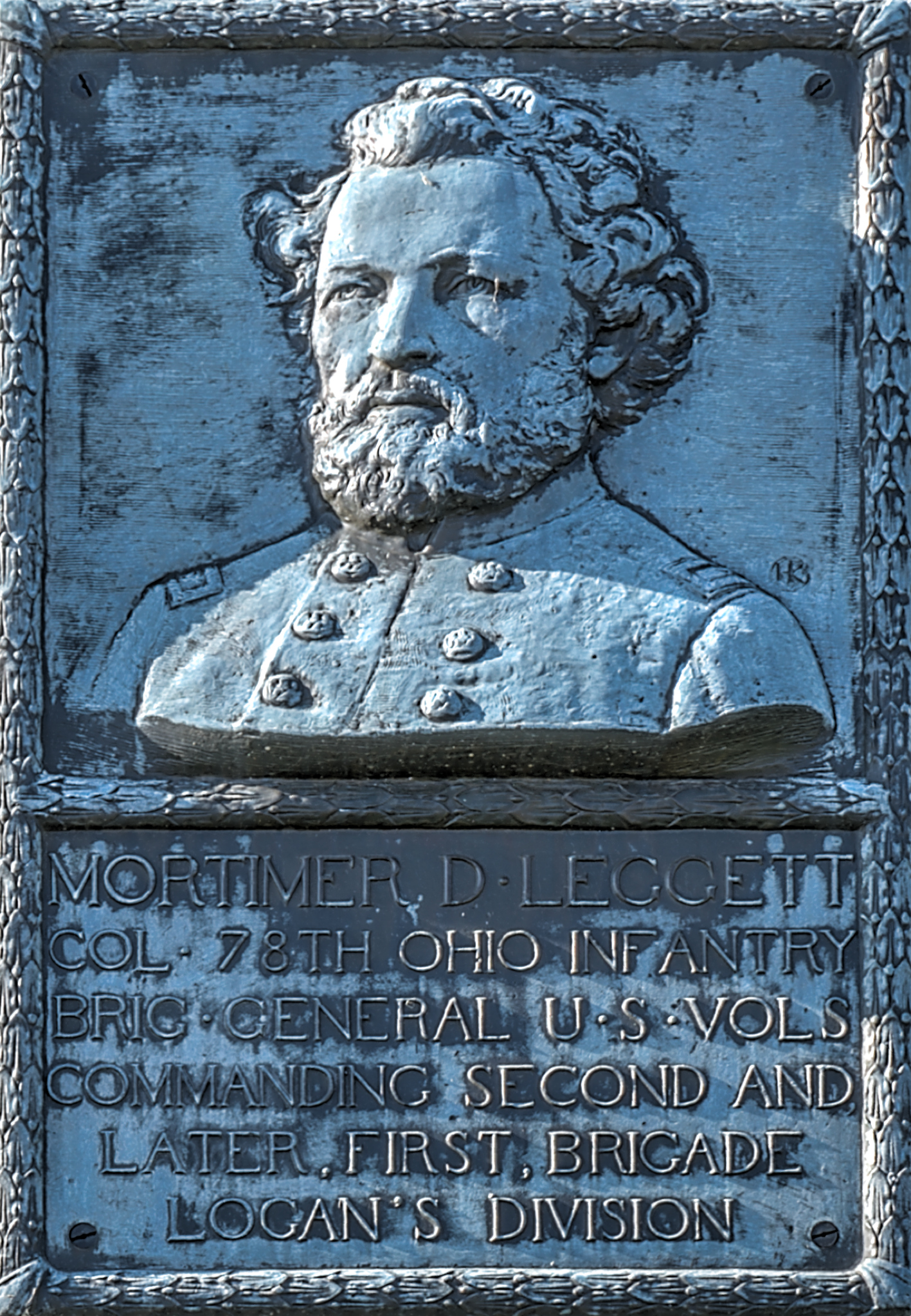
Bronze relief portrait of Colonel Leggett at Vicksburg National Military Park

== See also ==
- List of Ohio Civil War units
- Ohio in the Civil War
- The Glorious 78th Ohio Veteran Volunteer Infantry
