= 1941 Colorado A&M Aggies football team =

American college football season

1941 Colorado A&M Aggies football
- Conference: Mountain States Conference
- Record: 4–2–1 (3–2–1 MSC)
- Head coach: Harry W. Hughes (31st season)
- Home stadium: Colorado Field

1941 Mountain States Conference football standings
	Conf.					Overall
Team	W		L		T	W		L		T
Utah $	4	–	0	–	2	6	–	0	–	2
BYU	3	–	1	–	2	4	–	3	–	2
Denver	3	–	1	–	2	4	–	3	–	2
Colorado A&M	3	–	2	–	1	4	–	2	–	1
Colorado	3	–	2	–	1	3	–	4	–	1
Wyoming	1	–	5	–	0	2	–	7	–	1
Utah State	0	–	6	–	0	0	–	8	–	0
$ – Conference champion

The 1941 Colorado A&M Aggies football team represented Colorado State College of Agriculture and Mechanic Arts in the Mountain States Conference (MSC) during the 1941 college football season. In their 31st season under head coach Harry W. Hughes, the Aggies compiled a 4–2–1 record (3–2–1 against MSC opponents), tied for fourth place in the MSC, and outscored opponents by a total of 109 to 77.

== Schedule ==
Date	Opponent	Site	Result	Attendance	Source
September 27	Colorado Mines*	Colorado Field; Fort Collins, CO	W 21–6		
October 4	Wyoming^{†}	Colorado Field; Fort Collins, CO (rivalry)	W 27–0	6,200	
October 18	at Colorado	Colorado Stadium; Boulder, CO (rivalry)	L 13–26		
October 25	at Utah State	Aggie Stadium; Logan, UT	W 7–6	5,000	
November 1	at Denver	Denver University Stadium; Denver, CO	T 6–6	11,000	
November 15	Utah	Colorado Field; Fort Collins, CO	L 13–26	5,000	
November 22	at BYU	"Y" Stadium; Provo, UT	W 22–7	> 2,000	
*Non-conference game; ^{†}Homecoming
