= 1945 Colorado Buffaloes football team =

American college football season

1945 Colorado Buffaloes football
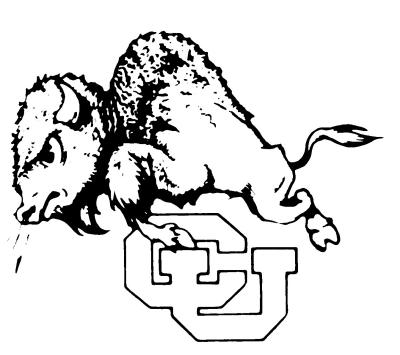
- Conference: Mountain States Conference
- Record: 5–3 (3–1 MSC)
- Head coach: Frank Potts (3rd season)
- Captain: Game captains
- Home stadium: Folsom Field

1945 Mountain States Conference football standings
	Conf.					Overall
Team	W		L		T	W		L		T
Denver $	4	–	1	–	0	4	–	5	–	1
Colorado	3	–	1	–	0	5	–	3	–	0
Utah	3	–	2	–	0	4	–	4	–	0
Utah State	1	–	3	–	0	4	–	3	–	0
Colorado A&M	0	–	4	–	0	2	–	5	–	1
$ – Conference champion

The 1945 Colorado Buffaloes football team was an American football team that represented the University of Colorado as a member of the Mountain States Conference (MSC) during the 1945 college football season. Led by Frank Potts in his third and final season as head coach, the Buffaloes compiled an overall record of 5–3 with a mark of 3–1 in conference play, placing second in the MSC.

== Schedule ==
Date	Opponent	Site	Result	Attendance	Source
September 22	Fort Warren*	Folsom Field; Boulder CO	L 0–6	6,000	
September 29	at Colorado College*	Washburn Field; Colorado Springs, CO	W 13–0		
October 6	Utah^{†}	Folsom Field; Boulder, CO (rivalry)	W 18–13	10,000	
October 13	at Colorado A&M	Colorado Field; Fort Collins, CO (rivalry)	W 21–6		
October 20	Colorado College*	Folsom Field; Boulder, CO	W 31–0	3,000	
November 3	at New Mexico*	Lobo Stadium; Albuquerque, MN	L 6–12	8,000	
November 10	Utah State	Folsom Field; Boulder, CO	W 14–7	8,000	
November 22	at Denver	Hilltop Stadium; Denver, CO	L 8–14	> 25,000	
*Non-conference game; ^{†}Homecoming

== After the season ==
=== NFL draft ===
The following Buffaloes were selected in 1946 NFL draft following the season.

Round	Pick	Player	Position	NFL club
8	64	John Ziegler	Back	Chicago Bears
9	77	Ernie Lewis	Back	Philadelphia Eagles
10	85	Walt Clay	Back	New York Giants
11	92	Bob West	Back	Yanks
18	170	Bob Wise	Guard	Los Angeles Rams
19	179	LaMar Dykstra	Back	Washington Redskins
21	197	Don Fabling	Back	Philadelphia Eagles
27	260	Joe Ben Dickey	Back	Los Angeles Rams
