= 1949 Colorado A&M Aggies football team =

American college football season

1949 Colorado A&M Aggies football
- Conference: Skyline Six Conference
- Record: 9–1 (4–1 Skyline Six)
- Head coach: Bob Davis (3rd season)
- Home stadium: Colorado Field

1949 Skyline Six Conference football standings
	Conf.					Overall
Team	W		L		T	W		L		T
Wyoming $	5	–	0	–	0	9	–	1	–	0
Colorado A&M	4	–	1	–	0	9	–	1	–	0
Denver	2	–	2	–	0	4	–	6	–	0
Utah	2	–	3	–	0	2	–	7	–	1
Utah State	1	–	3	–	0	3	–	7	–	0
BYU	0	–	5	–	0	0	–	11	–	0
$ – Conference champion

The 1949 Colorado A&M Aggies football team represented Colorado State College of Agriculture and Mechanic Arts in the Skyline Six Conference during the 1949 college football season. In their third season under head coach Bob Davis, the Aggies compiled a 9–1 record (4–1 against Skyline opponents), finished second in the Skyline Conference, and outscored all opponents by a total of 206 to 86.

Halfback Eddie Hanna died from suspected cardiac arrest following the Aggies' opening game against Colorado College. His jersey number (No. 21) was immediately retired following his death, and no player has worn it since.

Thurman "Fum" McGraw received first-team honors from the International News Service as an offensive tackle on the 1949 College Football All-America Team. He was the first Colorado A&M player to receive first-team All-America honors. McGraw went on to play five seasons in the National Football League as a defensive tackle for the Detroit Lions.

Three Colorado Agricultural players received all-conference honors in 1949: McGraw, guard Dale Dodrill, and end George Jones.

== Schedule ==
Date	Opponent	Site	Result	Attendance	Source
September 17	at Colorado College*	Washburn Field; Colorado Springs, CO	W 14–7		
September 24	at Denver	Hilltop Stadium; Denver, CO	W 14–13	24,500	
October 1	Wyoming	Colorado Field; Fort Collins, CO (rivalry)	L 0–8	12,500	
October 7	Montana*	Colorado Field; Fort Collins, CO	W 27–12	5,000	
October 15	Colorado Mines*	Colorado Field; Fort Collins, CO	W 27–7		
October 29	Utah State^{†}	Colorado Field; Fort Collins, CO	W 28–6		
November 5	at Utah	Ute Stadium; Salt Lake City, UT	W 21–12		
November 11	at BYU	Cougar Stadium; Provo, UT	W 16–14		
November 19	at New Mexico A&M*	Quesenberry Field; Las Cruces, NM	W 45–0		
November 26	at Colorado*	Folsom Field; Boulder, CO (rivalry)	W 14–7	20,563	
*Non-conference game; ^{†}Homecoming

== After the season ==
=== NFL draft ===
The following Aggie was selected in the 1950 NFL draft following the season.

Round	Pick	Player	Position	NFL club
2	27	Thurman McGraw	Tackle	Detroit Lions
