= 1942 Colorado A&M Aggies football team =

American college football season

1942 Colorado A&M Aggies football
- Conference: Mountain States Conference
- Record: 4–3 (2–3 MSC)
- Head coach: Julius Wagner (1st season)
- Home stadium: Colorado Field

1942 Mountain States Conference football standings
	Conf.					Overall
Team	W		L		T	W		L		T
Colorado +	5	–	1	–	0	7	–	2	–	0
Utah +	5	–	1	–	0	6	–	3	–	0
Denver	3	–	2	–	1	6	–	3	–	1
Utah State	2	–	3	–	1	6	–	3	–	1
Colorado A&M	2	–	3	–	0	4	–	3	–	0
BYU	1	–	4	–	0	2	–	5	–	0
Wyoming	1	–	5	–	0	3	–	5	–	0
+ – Conference co-champions

The 1942 Colorado A&M Aggies football team represented Colorado State College of Agriculture and Mechanic Arts in the Mountain States Conference (MSC) during the 1942 college football season. In their first season under head coach Julius Wagner, the Aggies compiled a 4–3 record (2–3 against MSC opponents), finished fifth in the MSC, and were outscored by a total of 99 to 97.

Colorado A&M was ranked at No. 144 (out of 590 college and military teams) in the final rankings under the Litkenhous Difference by Score System for 1942.

== Schedule ==
Date	Opponent	Site	Result	Attendance	Source
September 26	at Wyoming	Corbett Field; Laramie, WY (rivalry)	W 10–0		
October 3	Colorado Mines*	Colorado Field; Fort Collins, CO	W 27–0		
October 10	at Denver	Hilltop Stadium; Denver, CO	L 0–26	> 12,800	
October 24	Colorado^{†}	Colorado Field; Fort Collins, CO (rivalry)	L 7–34	2,300	
October 31	at Utah	Ute Stadium; Salt Lake City, UT	L 14–33	4,000	
November 7	Utah State	Colorado Field; Fort Collins, CO	W 25–0		
November 14	at Colorado State–Greeley*	Jackson Field; Greeley, CO	W 14–6		
*Non-conference game; ^{†}Homecoming

== After the season ==
=== NFL draft ===
The following Aggies were selected in the 1943 NFL draft following the season.

Round	Pick	Player	Position	NFL club
18	161	Chet Meada	Back	Detroit Lions
24	223	Lou Dent	Back	Brooklyn Dodgers

The following Aggie was selected in the 1944 NFL draft despite Colorado A&M not having a team in 1943.

Round	Pick	Player	Position	NFL club
8	70	Roy Clay	Back	New York Giants
