= 1945 Colorado A&M Aggies football team =

American college football season

1945 Colorado A&M Aggies football
- Conference: Mountain States Conference
- Record: 2–5–1 (0–4 MSC)
- Head coach: Julius Wagner (2nd season)
- Home stadium: Colorado Field

1945 Mountain States Conference football standings
	Conf.					Overall
Team	W		L		T	W		L		T
Denver $	4	–	1	–	0	4	–	5	–	1
Colorado	3	–	1	–	0	5	–	3	–	0
Utah	3	–	2	–	0	4	–	4	–	0
Utah State	1	–	3	–	0	4	–	3	–	0
Colorado A&M	0	–	4	–	0	2	–	5	–	1
$ – Conference champion

The 1945 Colorado A&M Aggies football team represented Colorado State College of Agriculture and Mechanic Arts in the Mountain States Conference (MSC) during the 1945 college football season. In their second season under head coach Julius Wagner, the Aggies compiled a 2–5–1 record (0–4 against MSC opponents), finished last in the MSC, and were outscored by a total of 179 to 89.

== Schedule ==
Date	Opponent	Site	Result	Attendance	Source
September 28	at Colorado State–Greeley*	Jackson Field; Greeley, CO	W 33–0		
October 6	at Fort Warren*	Cheyenne, WY	L 7–60		
October 13	Colorado	Colorado Field; Fort Collins, CO (rivalry)	L 6–21		
October 20	at Utah State	Aggie Stadium; Logan, UT	L 0–13	1,000	
October 27	Utah^{†}	Colorado Field; Fort Collins, CO	L 0–28	1,600	
November 3	Colorado State–Greeley*	Colorado Field; Fort Collins, CO	W 25–14	1,615	
November 10	at Denver	DU Stadium; Denver, CO	L 12–35	6,000	
November 24	at Colorado College*	Washburn Field; Colorado Springs, CO	T 7–7		
*Non-conference game; ^{†}Homecoming
