= 1945 Utah Utes football team =

American college football season

1945 Utah Utes football
- Conference: Mountain States Conference
- Record: 4–4 (3–2 MSC)
- Head coach: Ike Armstrong (21st season)
- Home stadium: Ute Stadium

1945 Mountain States Conference football standings
	Conf.					Overall
Team	W		L		T	W		L		T
Denver $	4	–	1	–	0	4	–	5	–	1
Colorado	3	–	1	–	0	5	–	3	–	0
Utah	3	–	2	–	0	4	–	4	–	0
Utah State	1	–	3	–	0	4	–	3	–	0
Colorado A&M	0	–	4	–	0	2	–	5	–	1
$ – Conference champion

The 1945 Utah Utes football team, or also commonly known as the Utah Redskins, was an American football team that represented the University of Utah as a member of the Mountain States Conference (MSC) during the 1945 college football season. In their 21st season under head coach Ike Armstrong, the Utes compiled an overall record of 4–4 with a mark of 3–2 against conference opponents, placing third in the MSC.

== Schedule ==
Date	Opponent	Site	Result	Attendance	Source
September 29	Nevada*	Ute Stadium; Salt Lake City, UT	L 14–33		
October 6	at Colorado	Folsom Field; Boulder, CO (rivalry)	L 13–18	10,000	
October 12	at Denver	DU Stadium; Denver, CO	L 7–21	13,602	
October 20	No. 15 Oklahoma A&M*	Ute Stadium; Salt Lake City, UT	L 6–46		
October 27	at Colorado A&M	Colorado Field; Fort Collins, CO	W 28–0	1,600	
November 3	Denver^{†}	Ute Stadium; Salt Lake City, UT	W 33–21	11,126	
November 10	at New Mexico*	Lobo Stadium; Albuquerque, NM	W 21–20	7,000	
November 22	Utah State	Ute Stadium; Salt Lake City, UT (rivalry)	W 24–6	20,000	
*Non-conference game; ^{†}Homecoming; Rankings from AP Poll released prior to the game

== NFL draft ==
Utah had five players selected in the 1946 NFL draft.

Player	Position	Round	Pick	NFL team
Gay Adelt	Back	5	39	Washington Redskins
Reed Nostrum	Tackle	13	114	Chicago Bears
Stan Stapley	Tackle	15	135	New York Giants
Lawrence Mauss	Center	19	177	Philadelphia Eagles
Tom Panos	Guard	30	287	Detroit Lions
