= 1947 Colorado Buffaloes football team =

American college football season

1947 Colorado Buffaloes football
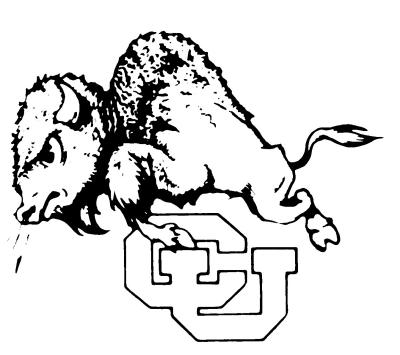
- Conference: Mountain States Conference
- Record: 4–5 (3–3 MSC)
- Head coach: James J. Yeager (5th season)
- Captain: Game captains
- Home stadium: Folsom Field

1947 Mountain States Conference football standings
	Conf.					Overall
Team	W		L		T	W		L		T
Utah $	6	–	0	–	0	8	–	1	–	1
Denver	3	–	2	–	1	5	–	4	–	1
Utah State	3	–	3	–	0	6	–	5	–	0
Colorado	3	–	3	–	0	4	–	5	–	0
Colorado A&M	2	–	3	–	1	5	–	4	–	1
Wyoming	2	–	4	–	0	4	–	5	–	0
BYU	1	–	5	–	0	3	–	7	–	0
$ – Conference champion

The 1947 Colorado Buffaloes football team was an American football team that represented the University of Colorado as a member of the Mountain States Conference (MSC) during the 1947 college football season. Led by James J. Yeager in his fifth and final season as head coach, the Buffaloes compiled and overall record of 4–5 with a mark of 3–3 in conference play, tying for third place in the MSC.

Colorado was ranked at No. 109 (out of 500 college football teams) in the final Litkenhous Ratings for 1947.

== Schedule ==
Date	Opponent	Site	Result	Attendance	Source
September 27	at Iowa State*	Clyde Williams Field; Ames, IA	W 7–0	8,500	
October 4	at Army*	Michie Stadium; West Point, NY	L 0–47	21,000	
October 11	Missouri*	Folsom Field; Boulder, CO	L 0–21	13,000	
October 18	BYU	Folsom Field; Boulder, CO	W 9–7	12,000	
October 25	at Colorado A&M	Colorado Field; Fort Collins, CO (rivalry)	W 14–7	12,500	
November 1	Utah^{†}	Folsom Field; Boulder, CO (rivalry)	L 7–13	22,000	
November 8	at Utah State	Aggie Stadium; Logan, UT	L 12–35	8,000	
November 15	Wyoming	Folsom Field; Boulder, CO	W 21–6	< 10,000	
November 27	at Denver	DU Stadium; Denver, CO	L 20–26	28,000	
*Non-conference game; ^{†}Homecoming

== After the season ==
=== NFL draft ===
The following Buffaloes were selected in 1948 NFL draft following the season.

Round	Pick	Player	Position	NFL club
11	90	Johnny Zisch	End	Los Angeles Rams
22	197	Jack McEwen	Back	Detroit Lions
26	241	Aubrey Allen	Tackle	Green Bay Packers
