= 1942 Utah State Aggies football team =

American college football season

1942 Utah State Aggies football
- Conference: Mountain States Conference
- Record: 6–3–1 (2–3–1 MSC)
- Head coach: Dick Romney (24th season)
- Home stadium: Aggie Stadium

1942 Mountain States Conference football standings
	Conf.					Overall
Team	W		L		T	W		L		T
Colorado +	5	–	1	–	0	7	–	2	–	0
Utah +	5	–	1	–	0	6	–	3	–	0
Denver	3	–	2	–	1	6	–	3	–	1
Utah State	2	–	3	–	1	6	–	3	–	1
Colorado A&M	2	–	3	–	0	4	–	3	–	0
BYU	1	–	4	–	0	2	–	5	–	0
Wyoming	1	–	5	–	0	3	–	5	–	0
+ – Conference co-champions

The 1942 Utah State Aggies football team was an American football team that represented Utah State Agricultural College in the Mountain States Conference (MSC) during the 1942 college football season. In their 24th season under head coach Dick Romney, the Aggies compiled a 6–3–1 record (2–3–1 against MSC opponents), finished in fourth place in the MSC, and outscored opponents by a total of 201 to 137.

Utah State was ranked at No. 138 (out of 590 college and military teams) in the final rankings under the Litkenhous Difference by Score System for 1942.

== Schedule ==
Date	Opponent	Site	Result	Attendance	Source
September 26	Naval-Marine radio trainees*	Aggie Stadium; Logan, UT	W 47–0		
October 3	Regis*	Aggie Stadium; Logan, UT	W 28–2	500	
October 9	at Colorado	Colorado Stadium; Boulder, CO	L 14–31		
October 17	Utah	Aggie Stadium; Logan, UT (Battle of the Brothers)	L 6–34	4,000	
October 23	Fort Douglas*	Aggie Stadium; Logan, UT	W 49–7	1,000	
October 31	at BYU	Cougar Stadium; Provo, UT (rivalry)	W 9–6	4,000	
November 7	at Colorado A&M	Colorado Field; Fort Collins, CO	L 0–25		
November 14	at Denver	DU Stadium; Denver, CO	T 13–13	7,000	
November 21	Wyoming	Aggie Stadium; Logan, UT (rivalry)	W 14–6	2,000	
November 26	at Wichita*	Wichita, KS	W 21–13	4,500	
*Non-conference game
