= 1947 Colorado A&M Aggies football team =

American college football season

1947 Colorado A&M Aggies football
- Conference: Mountain States Conference
- Record: 5–4–1 (2–3–1 MSC)
- Head coach: Bob Davis (1st season)
- Home stadium: Colorado Field

1947 Mountain States Conference football standings
	Conf.					Overall
Team	W		L		T	W		L		T
Utah $	6	–	0	–	0	8	–	1	–	1
Denver	3	–	2	–	1	5	–	4	–	1
Utah State	3	–	3	–	0	6	–	5	–	0
Colorado	3	–	3	–	0	4	–	5	–	0
Colorado A&M	2	–	3	–	1	5	–	4	–	1
Wyoming	2	–	4	–	0	4	–	5	–	0
BYU	1	–	5	–	0	3	–	7	–	0
$ – Conference champion

The 1947 Colorado A&M Aggies football team represented Colorado State College of Agriculture and Mechanic Arts in the Mountain States Conference (MSC) during the 1947 college football season. In their first season under head coach Bob Davis, the Aggies compiled a 5–4–1 record (2–3–1 against MSC opponents), finished fifth in the MSC, and were outscored by a total of 182 to 159. The team played home games at Colorado Field in Fort Collins, Colorado.

In the final Litkenhous Ratings released in mid-December, Colorado A&M was ranked at No. 138 out of 500 college football teams.

== Schedule ==
Date	Opponent	Site	Result	Attendance	Source
September 19	Colorado Mines*	Colorado Field; Fort Collins, CO	W 20–12		
September 27	at Drake*	Drake Stadium; Des Moines, IA	W 23–19	8,200	
October 4	Utah State	Colorado Field; Fort Collins, CO	L 13–26		
October 11	at Denver	Denver Stadium; Denver, CO	T 13–13	11,200	
October 18	at Colorado College*	Washburn Field; Colorado Springs, CO	W 28–7		
October 25	Colorado^{†}	Colorado Field; Fort Collins, CO (rivalry)	L 7–14	12,500	
November 8	at Utah	Ute Stadium; Salt Lake City, UT	L 0–19	11,181	
November 15	at BYU	Cougar Stadium; Provo, UT	W 27–25	12,000	
November 22	Wyoming	Colorado Field; Fort Collins, CO (rivalry)	W 21–6		
November 29	at Montana*	Dornblaser Field; Missoula, MT	L 7–41	5,000	
*Non-conference game; ^{†}Homecoming
