= 1944 Utah State Aggies football team =

American college football season

1944 Utah State Aggies football
- Conference: Mountain States Conference
- Record: 3–3 (0–2 MSC)
- Head coach: Dick Romney (25th season)
- Home stadium: Aggie Stadium

1944 Mountain States Conference football standings
	Conf.					Overall
Team	W		L		T	W		L		T
Colorado $	2	–	0	–	0	6	–	2	–	0
Denver	2	–	1	–	1	4	–	3	–	2
Utah	1	–	2	–	1	5	–	2	–	1
Utah State	0	–	2	–	0	3	–	3	–	0
$ – Conference champion

The 1944 Utah State Aggies football team was an American football team that represented Utah State Agricultural College in the Mountain States Conference (MSC) during the 1944 college football season. In their 25th season under head coach Dick Romney, the Aggies compiled a 3–3 record (0–2 against MSC opponents), finished fourth in the MSC, and were outscored by a total of 109 to 88.

== Schedule ==
Date	Opponent	Site	Result	Attendance	Source
October 14	Pocatello Marines*	Aggie Stadium; Logan, UT	W 40–0	1,000	
October 21	Nevada*	Aggie Stadium; Logan, UT	L 7–13		
October 28	at Denver	DU Stadium; Denver, CO	L 6–36	6,000	
November 4	at Pocatello Marines*	Pocatello, ID	W 27–6		
November 11	Idaho Southern Branch*	Aggie Stadium; Logan, UT	W 8–7		
November 23	at Utah	Ute Stadium; Salt Lake City, UT (rivalry)	L 0–47		
*Non-conference game
