= 1947 Utah State Aggies football team =

American college football season

1947 Utah State Aggies football

Grape Bowl, L 21–35 vs. Pacific (CA)
- Conference: Mountain States Conference
- Record: 6–5 (3–3 MSC)
- Head coach: Dick Romney (28th season)
- Home stadium: Aggie Stadium

1947 Mountain States Conference football standings
| | Conf. | | | | | Overall |
| Team | W | | L | | T | W | | L | | T |
|---|---|---|---|---|---|---|---|---|---|---|
| Utah $ | 6 | – | 0 | – | 0 | 8 | – | 1 | – | 1 |
| Denver | 3 | – | 2 | – | 1 | 5 | – | 4 | – | 1 |
| Utah State | 3 | – | 3 | – | 0 | 6 | – | 5 | – | 0 |
| Colorado | 3 | – | 3 | – | 0 | 4 | – | 5 | – | 0 |
| Colorado A&M | 2 | – | 3 | – | 1 | 5 | – | 4 | – | 1 |
| Wyoming | 2 | – | 4 | – | 0 | 4 | – | 5 | – | 0 |
| BYU | 1 | – | 5 | – | 0 | 3 | – | 7 | – | 0 |
$ – Conference champion

The 1947 Utah State Aggies football team was an American football team that represented Utah State Agricultural College in the Mountain States Conference (MSC) during the 1947 college football season. In their 28th season under head coach Dick Romney, the Aggies compiled a 6–5 record (3–3 against MSC opponents), tied for third place in the MSC, lost to Pacific in the Grape Bowl, and outscored opponents by a total of 228 to 210.

Utah State was ranked at No. 102 (out of 500 college football teams) in the final Litkenhous Ratings for 1947.

== Schedule ==
| Date | Opponent | Site | Result | Attendance | Source |
|---|---|---|---|---|---|
| September 20 | San Diego State* | Aggie Stadium; Logan, UT | L 19–24 | 12,000 | |
| September 27 | Wichita* | Aggie Stadium; Logan, UT | W 21–6 | 10,000 | |
| October 4 | at Colorado A&M | Colorado Field; Fort Collins, CO | W 26–13 | | |
| October 10 | Montana* | Aggie Stadium; Logan, UT | W 13–7 | 5,000 | |
| October 18 | at Wyoming | Corbett Field; Laramie, WY (rivalry) | L 19–33 | 6,436 | |
| October 25 | at BYU | Cougar Stadium; Provo, UT (rivalry) | L 12–27 | 11,000 | |
| November 1 | at Montana State* | Gatton Field; Bozeman, MT | W 28–13 | 7,000 | |
| November 8 | Colorado | Aggie Stadium; Logan, UT | W 35–12 | 8,000 | |
| November 15 | Denver | Aggie Stadium; Logan, UT | W 20–0 | | |
| November 27 | at Utah | Ute Stadium; Salt Lake City, UT (rivalry) | L 14–40 | 29,132 | |
| December 13 | vs. Pacific (CA) | Grape Bowl; Lodi, CA (Grape Bowl) | L 21–35 | 12,000 | |
*Non-conference game
