= 1941 BYU Cougars football team =

American college football season

1941 BYU Cougars football
- Conference: Mountain States Conference
- Record: 4–3–2 (3–1–2 MSC)
- Head coach: Eddie Kimball (5th season)
- Home stadium: 'Y' Stadium

1941 Mountain States Conference football standings
	Conf.					Overall
Team	W		L		T	W		L		T
Utah $	4	–	0	–	2	6	–	0	–	2
BYU	3	–	1	–	2	4	–	3	–	2
Denver	3	–	1	–	2	4	–	3	–	2
Colorado A&M	3	–	2	–	1	4	–	2	–	1
Colorado	3	–	2	–	1	3	–	4	–	1
Wyoming	1	–	5	–	0	2	–	7	–	1
Utah State	0	–	6	–	0	0	–	8	–	0
$ – Conference champion

The 1941 BYU Cougars football team was an American football team that represented (BYU) as a member of the Mountain States Conference (MSC) during the 1941 college football season. In their fifth season under head coach Eddie Kimball, the Cougars compiled an overall record of 4–3–2 with a mark of 3–1–2 against conference opponents, tied for second place in the MSC, and outscored opponents by a total of 136 to 100.

== Schedule ==
Date	Opponent	Site	Result	Attendance	Source
September 26	Montana*	'Y' Stadium; Provo, UT	L 7–20	5,500	
October 3	Colorado State–Greeley*	'Y' Stadium; Provo, UT	W 26–0	5,000	
October 10	at Denver	DU Stadium; Denver, CO	W 13–7		
October 18	at Utah	Ute Stadium; Salt Lake City, UT (rivalry)	T 6–6	13,000	
October 24	at San Francisco*	Seals Stadium; San Francisco, CA	L 13–25		
November 1	at Utah State	Aggie Stadium; Logan, UT (rivalry)	W 28–0	3,500	
November 8	at Wyoming	Corbett Field; Laramie, WY	W 23–7	7,000	
November 15	Colorado^{†}	'Y' Stadium; Provo, UT	T 13–13	10,000	
November 22	Colorado A&M	'Y' Stadium; Provo, UT	L 7–22	> 2,000	
*Non-conference game; ^{†}Homecoming
