= 1941 Wyoming Cowboys football team =

American college football season

1941 Wyoming Cowboys football
- Conference: Mountain States Conference
- Record: 2–7–1 (1–5 MSC)
- Head coach: Bunny Oakes (1st season)
- Captain: None
- Home stadium: Corbett Field

1941 Mountain States Conference football standings
	Conf.					Overall
Team	W		L		T	W		L		T
Utah $	4	–	0	–	2	6	–	0	–	2
BYU	3	–	1	–	2	4	–	3	–	2
Denver	3	–	1	–	2	4	–	3	–	2
Colorado A&M	3	–	2	–	1	4	–	2	–	1
Colorado	3	–	2	–	1	3	–	4	–	1
Wyoming	1	–	5	–	0	2	–	7	–	1
Utah State	0	–	6	–	0	0	–	8	–	0
$ – Conference champion

The 1941 Wyoming Cowboys football team represented the University of Wyoming in the Mountain States Conference (MSC) during the 1941 college football season. In its first season under head coach Bunny Oakes, the team compiled a 2–7–1 record (1–5 against MSC opponents), finished sixth in the conference, and was outscored by a total of 233 to 44.

== Schedule ==
Date	Opponent	Site	Result	Attendance	Source
September 26	at Colorado State–Greeley*	Jackson Field; Greeley, CO	W 19–6	3,000	
October 4	at Colorado A&M	Colorado Field; Fort Collins, CO (rivalry)	L 0–27	6,200	
October 11	at Utah	Ute Stadium; Salt Lake City, UT	L 6–60	10,000	
October 18	Denver	Corbett Field; Laramie, WY	L 0–40		
October 25	at Colorado	Colorado Stadium; Boulder, CO	L 0–27		
November 1	at Colorado College*	Washburn Field; Colorado Springs, CO	L 0–16		
November 8	BYU	Corbett Field; Laramie, WY	L 7–23	7,000	
November 15	Utah State	Corbett Field; Laramie, WY (rivalry)	W 12–6		
November 20	Colorado Mines*	Corbett Field; Laramie, WY	T 0–0		
November 29	at New Mexico*	Hilltop Stadium; Albuquerque, NM	L 0–28		
*Non-conference game
