= 1944 Utah Utes football team =

American college football season

1944 Utah Utes football
- Conference: Mountain States Conference
- Record: 5–2–1 (1–2–1 MSC)
- Head coach: Ike Armstrong (20th season)
- Home stadium: Ute Stadium

1944 Mountain States Conference football standings
	Conf.					Overall
Team	W		L		T	W		L		T
Colorado $	2	–	0	–	0	6	–	2	–	0
Denver	2	–	1	–	1	4	–	3	–	2
Utah	1	–	2	–	1	5	–	2	–	1
Utah State	0	–	2	–	0	3	–	3	–	0
$ – Conference champion

The 1944 Utah Utes football team, or also commonly known as the Utah Redskins, was an American football team that represented the University of Utah as a member of the Mountain States Conference (MSC) during the 1944 college football season. In their 20th season under head coach Ike Armstrong, the Utes compiled an overall record of 5–2–1 with a mark of 1–2–1 against conference opponents, placing third in the MSC.

== Schedule ==
Date	Opponent	Site	Result	Attendance	Source
September 30	Idaho Southern Branch*	Ute Stadium; Salt Lake City, UT	W 24–0	2,929	
October 6	at Denver	DU Stadium; Denver, CO	L 12–28	12,000	
October 14	Colorado	Ute Stadium; Salt Lake City, UT (rivalry)	L 0–26		
October 21	at Idaho Southern Branch*	Spud Bowl; Pocatello, ID	W 38–12		
October 28	at Nevada*	Mackay Field; Reno, NV	W 19–14	2,000	
November 4	Denver^{†}	Ute Stadium; Salt Lake City, UT	T 0–0	7,000	
November 11	at Colorado College*	Washburn Field; Colorado Springs, CO	W 21–6		
November 23	Utah State	Ute Stadium; Salt Lake City, UT (rivalry)	W 47–0		
*Non-conference game; ^{†}Homecoming

== NFL draft ==
Utah had one player selected in the 1945 NFL draft.

Player	Position	Round	Pick	NFL team
Bill Broderick	Tackle	31	323	New York Giants
