= Ike Armstrong =

American football player, coach and college athletics administrator

Biographical details
- Born: June 8, 1895; Fort Madison, Iowa, U.S.
- Died: September 4, 1983 (aged 88); Corona Del Mar, California, U.S.

Playing career

Football
- 1920s: Drake
- Position: Fullback

Coaching career (HC unless noted)

Football
- 1925–1949: Utah

Basketball
- 1925–1927: Utah

Administrative career (AD unless noted)
- 1925–1950: Utah
- 1950–1963: Minnesota

Head coaching record
- Overall: 141–55–15 (football); 9–18 (basketball)
- Bowls: 1–1

Accomplishments and honors

Championships
- Football; 7 RMC (1926, 1928–1933); 6 Mountain States / Skyline Six (1938, 1940–1942, 1947–1948)
- College Football Hall of Fame; Inducted in 1957 (profile)

Isaac John Armstrong (June 8, 1895 – September 4, 1983) was an American football player, coach of football, basketball, and track, and college athletics administrator. He served as the head football coach at the University of Utah from 1925 to 1949, compiling a record of 141–55–15. Ike Armstrong was the son of George Henry and Margaret Prudence (Gump) Armstrong.

Under Armstrong, Utah won 13 conference championships, seven in the Rocky Mountain Conference and six in the Mountain States / Skyline Six Conference. Armstrong's 25-year tenure is the longest of any Utah Utes football head coach and his 141 wins are the second most in program history. Armstrong also coached Utah's basketball and track teams and served as the school's athletic director. He attended Drake University, where he played college football as a fullback. From 1950 to 1963, he served the athletic director at the University of Minnesota. Armstrong was inducted into the College Football Hall of Fame as a coach in 1957.

Armstrong died of pneumonia, on September 4, 1983, at the Flagship Convalescent Home in Corona Del Mar, California.

== Head coaching record ==
=== Football ===
| Year | Team | Overall | Conference | Standing | Bowl/playoffs |
|---|---|---|---|---|---|
Utah Utes (Rocky Mountain Conference) (1925–1937)
| 1925 | Utah | 6–2 | 5–1 | T–2nd | |
| 1926 | Utah | 7–0 | 5–0 | 1st | |
| 1927 | Utah | 3–3–1 | 3–1–1 | T–3rd | |
| 1928 | Utah | 5–0–2 | 4–0–1 | 1st | |
| 1929 | Utah | 7–0 | 6–0 | 1st | |
| 1930 | Utah | 8–0 | 7–0 | 1st | |
| 1931 | Utah | 7–2 | 6–0 | 1st | |
| 1932 | Utah | 6–1–1 | 6–0 | 1st | |
| 1933 | Utah | 5–3 | 5–1 | T–1st | |
| 1934 | Utah | 5–3 | 4–2 | 5th | |
| 1935 | Utah | 4–3–1 | 4–1–1 | 3rd | |
| 1936 | Utah | 6–3 | 5–2 | 3rd | |
| 1937 | Utah | 5–3 | 5–2 | T–3rd | |
Utah Utes (Mountain States / Skyline Six Conference) (1938–1949)
| 1938 | Utah | 7–1–2 | 4–0–1 | 1st | W Sun |
| 1939 | Utah | 6–1–2 | 4–1–1 | 2nd | |
| 1940 | Utah | 7–2 | 5–1 | 1st | |
| 1941 | Utah | 6–0–2 | 4–0–2 | 1st | |
| 1942 | Utah | 6–3 | 5–1 | T–1st | |
| 1943 | Utah | 0–7 | 0–2 | 2nd | |
| 1944 | Utah | 5–2–1 | 1–2–1 | 3rd | |
| 1945 | Utah | 4–4 | 3–2 | 3rd | |
| 1946 | Utah | 8–3 | 4–2 | 3rd | L Pineapple |
| 1947 | Utah | 8–1–1 | 6–0 | 1st | |
| 1948 | Utah | 8–1–1 | 5–0 | 1st | |
| 1949 | Utah | 2–7–1 | 2–3 | 4th | |
| Utah: | | 141–55–15 | 108–24–8 | | |
| Total: | | 141–55–15 | | | |
National championship Conference title Conference division title or championship game berth
