= 1942 Wyoming Cowboys football team =

American college football season

1942 Wyoming Cowboys football
- Conference: Mountain States Conference
- Record: 3–5 (1–5 MSC)
- Head coach: Bunny Oakes (2nd season)
- Captain: None
- Home stadium: Corbett Field

1942 Mountain States Conference football standings
	Conf.					Overall
Team	W		L		T	W		L		T
Colorado +	5	–	1	–	0	7	–	2	–	0
Utah +	5	–	1	–	0	6	–	3	–	0
Denver	3	–	2	–	1	6	–	3	–	1
Utah State	2	–	3	–	1	6	–	3	–	1
Colorado A&M	2	–	3	–	0	4	–	3	–	0
BYU	1	–	4	–	0	2	–	5	–	0
Wyoming	1	–	5	–	0	3	–	5	–	0
+ – Conference co-champions

The 1942 Wyoming Cowboys football team represented the University of Wyoming in the Mountain States Conference (MSC) during the 1942 college football season. In its second season under head coach Bunny Oakes, the team compiled a 3–5 record (1–5 against MSC opponents), finished last in the conference, and was outscored by a total of 115 to 106.

Wyoming was ranked at No. 148 (out of 590 college and military teams) in the final rankings under the Litkenhous Difference by Score System for 1942.

== Schedule ==
Date	Opponent	Site	Result	Attendance	Source
September 26	Colorado A&M	Corbett Field; Laramie, WY (rivalry)	L 0–10		
October 3	at BYU	Cougar Stadium; Provo, UT	W 13–6	5,000	
October 10	Colorado State–Greeley*	Corbett Field; Laramie, WY	W 33–0		
October 17	at Denver	Hilltop Stadium; Denver, CO	L 14–17		
October 24	at Colorado Mines*	Brooks Field; Golden, CO	W 26–6		
October 31	at Colorado	Colorado Stadium; Boulder, CO	L 7–28		
November 14	Utah	Corbett Field; Laramie, WY	L 7–34		
November 21	at Utah State	Aggie Stadium; Logan, UT (rivalry)	L 6–14	2,000	
*Non-conference game
