= 1945 Utah State Aggies football team =

American college football season

1945 Utah State Aggies football
- Conference: Mountain States Conference
- Record: 4–3 (1–3 MSC)
- Head coach: Dick Romney (26th season)
- Home stadium: Aggie Stadium

1945 Mountain States Conference football standings
	Conf.					Overall
Team	W		L		T	W		L		T
Denver $	4	–	1	–	0	4	–	5	–	1
Colorado	3	–	1	–	0	5	–	3	–	0
Utah	3	–	2	–	0	4	–	4	–	0
Utah State	1	–	3	–	0	4	–	3	–	0
Colorado A&M	0	–	4	–	0	2	–	5	–	1
$ – Conference champion

The 1945 Utah State Aggies football team was an American football team that represented Utah State Agricultural College in the Mountain States Conference (MSC) during the 1945 college football season. In their 26th season under head coach Dick Romney, the Aggies compiled a 4–3 record (1–3 against MSC opponents) and finished fourth in the MSC. The team outscored opponents by a total of 173 to 92, largely on the strength of two shutout victories (45–0 and 52–0) against the Idaho Marines from Pocatello.

End John Putnik was named to the 1945 all-conference football team selected by the International News Service. He was also invited to play in the East-West Shrine Game. Back Jack Seiferling was drafted by the Pittsburgh Steelers in the fifth round of the 1946 NFL draft.

== Schedule ==
Date	Time	Opponent	Site	Result	Attendance	Source
September 29	2:30 p.m.	Idaho Marines*	Aggie Stadium; Logan, UT	W 45–0		
October 13		Montana*	Aggie Stadium; Logan, UT	W 44–13	2,500	
October 20		Colorado A&M	Aggie Stadium; Logan, UT	W 13–0	1,000	
October 27		at Denver	Hilltop Stadium; Denver, CO	L 6–41	11,020	
November 3		at Idaho Marines*	Pocatello, ID	W 52–0		
November 10		at Colorado	Folsom Field; Boulder, CO	L 7–14	8,000	
November 22		at Utah	Ute Stadium; Salt Lake City, UT (rivalry)	L 6–24	20,000	
*Non-conference game; All times are in Mountain time
