= 1949 BYU Cougars football team =

American college football season

1949 BYU Cougars football
- Conference: Skyline Six Conference
- Record: 0–11 (0–5 Skyline Six)
- Head coach: Chick Atkinson (1st season)
- Home stadium: Cougar Stadium

1949 Skyline Six Conference football standings
	Conf.					Overall
Team	W		L		T	W		L		T
Wyoming $	5	–	0	–	0	9	–	1	–	0
Colorado A&M	4	–	1	–	0	9	–	1	–	0
Denver	2	–	2	–	0	4	–	6	–	0
Utah	2	–	3	–	0	2	–	7	–	1
Utah State	1	–	3	–	0	3	–	7	–	0
BYU	0	–	5	–	0	0	–	11	–	0
$ – Conference champion

The 1949 BYU Cougars football team was an American football team that represented Brigham Young University (BYU) as a member of the Skyline Six Conference during the 1949 college football season In their first season under head coach Chick Atkinson, the Cougars compiled an overall record of 0–11 with a mark of 0–5 against conference opponents, finished last in the Skyline Six, and were outscored by a total of 372 to 105.

== Schedule ==
Date	Opponent	Site	Result	Attendance	Source
September 17	Texas Western*	Cougar Stadium; Provo, UT	L 6–47		
September 23	Pacific Fleet*	Cougar Stadium; Provo, UT	L 13–27		
October 1	San Jose State*	Cougar Stadium; Provo, UT	L 21–40		
October 8	at Utah	Ute Stadium; Salt Lake City, UT (rivalry)	L 0–38		
October 15	at Arizona State*	Goodwin Stadium; Tempe, AZ	L 21–49		
October 22	at Denver	Hilltop Stadium; Denver, CO	L 7–35	13,900	
October 29	at Wyoming	Corbett Field; Laramie, WY	L 0–45		
November 5	Utah State	Cougar Stadium; Provo, UT (rivalry)	L 3–22		
November 11	Colorado A&M	Cougar Stadium; Provo, UT	L 14–16		
November 19	at Montana*	Dornblaser Field; Missoula, MT	L 6–25	3,500	
November 26	at Pepperdine*	Sentinel Field; Inglewood, CA	L 14–28	8,000	
*Non-conference game
