= 1941 Colorado Buffaloes football team =

American college football season

1941 Colorado Buffaloes football
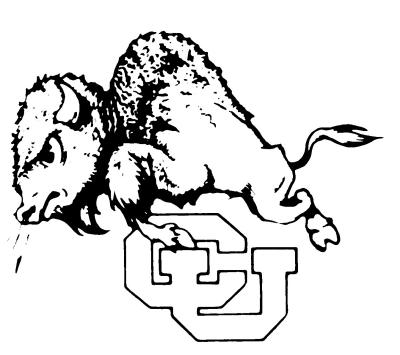
- Conference: Mountain States Conference
- Record: 3–4–1 (3–2–1 MSC)
- Head coach: James J. Yeager (1st season)
- Captain: Game captains
- Home stadium: Colorado Stadium

1941 Mountain States Conference football standings
	Conf.					Overall
Team	W		L		T	W		L		T
Utah $	4	–	0	–	2	6	–	0	–	2
BYU	3	–	1	–	2	4	–	3	–	2
Denver	3	–	1	–	2	4	–	3	–	2
Colorado A&M	3	–	2	–	1	4	–	2	–	1
Colorado	3	–	2	–	1	3	–	4	–	1
Wyoming	1	–	5	–	0	2	–	7	–	1
Utah State	0	–	6	–	0	0	–	8	–	0
$ – Conference champion

The 1941 Colorado Buffaloes football team was an American football team that represented the University of Colorado as a member of the Mountain States Conference (MSC) during the 1941 college football season. Led by first-year head coach James J. Yeager, the Buffaloes compiled an overall record of 3–4–1 with a mark of 3–2–1 in conference play, tying for fourth place in the MSC. Colorado was outscored by a total of 161 to 97 on the season.

Colorado was ranked at No. 116 (out of 681 teams) in the final rankings under the Litkenhous Difference by Score System for 1941.

The team played its home games at Colorado Stadium in Boulder, Colorado.

== Schedule ==
Date	Opponent	Site	Result	Attendance	Source
September 27	Texas*	Colorado Stadium; Boulder, CO	L 6–34	15,000	
October 4	at Missouri*	Memorial Stadium; Columbia, MO	L 6–21	5,000	
October 11	Utah State	Colorado Stadium; Boulder, CO	W 13–7	7,500	
October 18	Colorado A&M^{†}	Colorado Stadium; Boulder, CO (rivalry)	W 26–13		
October 25	Wyoming	Colorado Stadium; Boulder, CO	W 27–0		
November 1	at Utah	Ute Stadium; Salt Lake City, UT (rivalry)	L 6–46	16,000	
November 15	at BYU	"Y" Stadium; Provo, UT	T 13–13	10,000	
November 20	at Denver	DU Stadium; Denver, CO	L 0–27		
*Non-conference game; ^{†}Homecoming

== After the season ==
=== NFL draft ===
The following Buffalo was selected in the 1942 NFL draft following the season.

Round	Pick	Player	Position	NFL club
19	171	Ray Jenkins	Back	Pittsburgh Steelers
