= 1947 Wyoming Cowboys football team =

American college football season

1947 Wyoming Cowboys football
- Conference: Mountain States Conference
- Record: 4–5 (2–4 MSC)
- Head coach: Bowden Wyatt (1st season)
- Captain: Ed Chenoweth
- Home stadium: Corbett Field

1947 Mountain States Conference football standings
	Conf.					Overall
Team	W		L		T	W		L		T
Utah $	6	–	0	–	0	8	–	1	–	1
Denver	3	–	2	–	1	5	–	4	–	1
Utah State	3	–	3	–	0	6	–	5	–	0
Colorado	3	–	3	–	0	4	–	5	–	0
Colorado A&M	2	–	3	–	1	5	–	4	–	1
Wyoming	2	–	4	–	0	4	–	5	–	0
BYU	1	–	5	–	0	3	–	7	–	0
$ – Conference champion

The 1947 Wyoming Cowboys football team represented the University of Wyoming in the Mountain States Conference (MSC) during the 1947 college football season. In their first season under head coach Bowden Wyatt, the Cowboys compiled a 4–5 record (2–4 against MSC opponents), finished sixth in the MSC, and outscored all opponents by a total of 175 to 168.

The 1947 season was Bowden Wyatt's first as a head coach. He was posthumously inducted into the College Football Hall of Fame as a coach in 1997.

In the final Litkenhous Ratings released in mid-December, Wyoming was ranked at No. 135 out of 500 college football teams.

== Schedule ==
Date	Opponent	Site	Result	Attendance	Source
September 27	at Arizona*	Arizona Stadium; Tucson, AZ	L 7–27	15,000	
October 4	BYU	Corbett Field; Laramie, WY	W 12–7		
October 11	Colorado Mines*	Corbett Field; Laramie, WY	W 53–6		
October 18	Utah State^{†}	Corbett Field; Laramie, WY (rivalry)	W 33–19	6,436	
October 25	Utah	Corbett Field; Laramie, WY	L 7–26	7,000	
November 1	at Colorado State–Greeley*	Jackson Field; Greeley, CO	W 44–14		
November 8	at Denver	Hilltop Stadium; Denver, CO	L 7–27		
November 15	at Colorado	Folsom Field; Boulder, CO	L 6–21	< 10,000	
November 22	at Colorado A&M	Colorado Field; Fort Collins, CO (rivalry)	L 6–21		
*Non-conference game; ^{†}Homecoming
