= Ellison Ketchum =

American football and basketball player, coach, and college athletics administrator

Cac Hubbard
Biographical details
- Born: July 22, 1908; Colorado Springs, Colorado, U.S.
- Died: November 21, 1960 (aged 52); Coral Gables, Florida, U.S.

Playing career

Football
- late 1920s: Denver

Basketball
- late 1920s: Denver

Coaching career (HC unless noted)

Football
- 1930–1931: Denver (freshmen)
- 1936–1938: Denver (freshmen)
- 1939–?: Denver (assistant)
- 1942: Denver

Basketball
- 1930–1932: Denver (freshmen)
- 1940–1943: Denver
- 1946–1948: Denver

Administrative career (AD unless noted)
- 1949–1951: Denver

Head coaching record
- Overall: 6–3–1 (football); 63–60 (basketball)

Ellison Edwin Ketchum (July 22, 1908 – November 21, 1960) was an American football and basketball player, coach, and college athletics administrator. He was the head football coach at the University of Denver for one season in 1942, compiling a record of 6–3–1. Ketchum served two stints as the head basketball coach at Denver, from 1940 to 1943 and from 1946 to 1948, amassing a record of 63–60.

== Biography ==
Ketchum was born on July 22, 1908, in Colorado Springs, Colorado. He graduated from the University of Denver, where he lettered in football and basketball, in 1930. Ketchum died of cancer on November 21, 1960, in Coral Gables, Florida.

== Head coaching record ==
=== Football ===
Year	Team	Overall	Conference	Standing
Denver Pioneers (Mountain States Conference) (1942)
1942	Denver	6–3–1	3–2–1	3rd
Denver:		6–3–1	3–2–1	
Total:		6–3–1		
