= 1947 BYU Cougars football team =

American college football season

1947 BYU Cougars football
- Conference: Mountain States Conference
- Record: 3–7 (1–5 MSC)
- Head coach: Eddie Kimball (7th season)

1947 Mountain States Conference football standings
	Conf.					Overall
Team	W		L		T	W		L		T
Utah $	6	–	0	–	0	8	–	1	–	1
Denver	3	–	2	–	1	5	–	4	–	1
Utah State	3	–	3	–	0	6	–	5	–	0
Colorado	3	–	3	–	0	4	–	5	–	0
Colorado A&M	2	–	3	–	1	5	–	4	–	1
Wyoming	2	–	4	–	0	4	–	5	–	0
BYU	1	–	5	–	0	3	–	7	–	0
$ – Conference champion

The 1947 BYU Cougars football team was an American football team that represented Brigham Young University (BYU) as a member of the Mountain States Conference (MSC) during the Mountain States Conference (MSC) during the 1947 college football season. In their seventh season under head coach Eddie Kimball, the Cougars compiled an overall record of 3–7 with a mark of 1–5 against conference opponents, finished seventh in the MSC, and were outscored by a total of 182 to 168.

In the final Litkenhous Ratings released in mid-December, BYU was ranked at No. 132 out of 500 college football teams.

== Schedule ==
Date	Opponent	Site	Result	Attendance	Source
September 20	Western State (CO)*	Cougar Stadium; Provo, UT	W 45–0	6,000	
September 26	Montana State*	Cougar Stadium; Provo, UT	W 19–14		
October 4	at Wyoming	Corbett Field; Laramie, WY	L 7–12		
October 11	at Utah	Ute Stadium; Salt Lake City, UT (rivalry)	L 6–28	19,000	
October 18	at Colorado	Folsom Field; Boulder, CO	L 7–9	12,000	
October 25	Utah State^{†}	Cougar Stadium; Provo, UT (rivalry)	W 27–12	11,000	
November 1	at Denver	DU Stadium; Denver, CO	L 6–20		
November 8	San Jose State*	Cougar Stadium; Provo, UT	L 19–28	5,000	
November 15	Colorado A&M	Cougar Stadium; Provo, UT	L 25–27	< 2,500	
November 22	at San Diego State*	Balboa Stadium; San Diego, CA	L 7–32		
*Non-conference game; ^{†}Homecoming
