= 1942 Colorado Buffaloes football team =

American college football season

1942 Colorado Buffaloes football
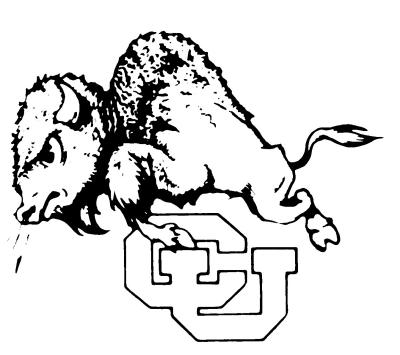

MSC co-champion
- Conference: Mountain States Conference
- Record: 7–2 (5–1 MSC)
- Head coach: James J. Yeager (2nd season)
- Captain: Game captains
- Home stadium: Colorado Stadium

1942 Mountain States Conference football standings
	Conf.					Overall
Team	W		L		T	W		L		T
Colorado +	5	–	1	–	0	7	–	2	–	0
Utah +	5	–	1	–	0	6	–	3	–	0
Denver	3	–	2	–	1	6	–	3	–	1
Utah State	2	–	3	–	1	6	–	3	–	1
Colorado A&M	2	–	3	–	0	4	–	3	–	0
BYU	1	–	4	–	0	2	–	5	–	0
Wyoming	1	–	5	–	0	3	–	5	–	0
+ – Conference co-champions

The 1942 Colorado Buffaloes football team was an American football team that represented the University of Colorado as a member of the Mountain States Conference (MSC) during the 1942 college football season. Led by second-year head coach James J. Yeager, the Buffaloes compiled an overall record of 7–2 with a mark of 5–1 in conference play, sharing the MSC title with Utah.

Colorado was ranked at No. 60 (out of 590 college and military teams) in the final rankings under the Litkenhous Difference by Score System for 1942.

== Schedule ==
Date	Opponent	Site	Result	Attendance	Source
September 26	Colorado Mines*	Colorado Stadium; Boulder, CO	W 54–0		
October 3	at Missouri*	Memorial Stadium; Columbia, MO	L 13–26	4,000	
October 9	Utah State	Colorado Stadium; Boulder, CO	W 31–14		
October 17	New Mexico*	Colorado Stadium; Boulder, CO	W 12–0	6,500	
October 24	at Colorado A&M	Colorado Field; Fort Collins, CO (rivalry)	W 34–7	2,300	
October 31	Wyoming	Colorado Stadium; Boulder, CO	W 28–7		
November 7	Utah^{†}	Colorado Stadium; Boulder, CO (rivalry)	L 0–13		
November 14	BYU	Colorado Stadium; Boulder, CO	W 48–0		
November 26	at Denver	DU Stadium; Denver, CO	W 31–6		
*Non-conference game; ^{†}Homecoming

== After the season ==
=== NFL draft ===
The following Buffalo was selected in the 1943 NFL draft following the season.

Round	Pick	Player	Position	NFL club
15	131	Dick Woodward	End	Detroit Lions
