= 1941 Utah Utes football team =

American college football season

1941 Utah Utes football

MSC champion
- Conference: Mountain States Conference
- Record: 6–0–2 (4–0–2 MSC)
- Head coach: Ike Armstrong (17th season)
- Home stadium: Ute Stadium

1941 Mountain States Conference football standings
	Conf.					Overall
Team	W		L		T	W		L		T
Utah $	4	–	0	–	2	6	–	0	–	2
BYU	3	–	1	–	2	4	–	3	–	2
Denver	3	–	1	–	2	4	–	3	–	2
Colorado A&M	3	–	2	–	1	4	–	2	–	1
Colorado	3	–	2	–	1	3	–	4	–	1
Wyoming	1	–	5	–	0	2	–	7	–	1
Utah State	0	–	6	–	0	0	–	8	–	0
$ – Conference champion

The 1941 Utah Utes football team, also commonly known as the Utah Redskins, was an American football team that represented the University of Utah as a member of the Mountain States Conference (MSC) during the 1941 college football season. In their 17th season under head coach Ike Armstrong, the Utes compiled an overall record of 6–0–2 with a mark of 4–0–2 against conference opponents, won the MSC championship, and all outscored opponents by a total of 209 to 65.

Utah was ranked at No. 62 (out of 681 teams) in the final rankings under the Litkenhous Difference by Score System for 1941.

The team played its home games at Ute Stadium in Salt Lake City.

== Schedule ==
Date	Opponent	Site	Result	Attendance	Source
September 27	at Idaho*	Neale Stadium; Moscow, ID	W 26–7	9,500	
October 11	Wyoming	Ute Stadium; Salt Lake City, UT	W 60–6	10,000	
October 18	BYU	Ute Stadium; Salt Lake City, UT (rivalry)	T 6–6	13,000	
October 25	at Denver	DU Stadium; Denver, CO	T 0–0	14,000	
November 1	Colorado^{†}	Ute Stadium; Salt Lake City, UT (rivalry)	W 46–6	16,000	
November 15	at Colorado A&M	Colorado Field; Fort Collins, CO	W 26–13	5,000	
November 20	Utah State	Ute Stadium; Salt Lake City, UT (rivalry)	W 33–21	10,000	
December 6	at Arizona*	Arizona Stadium; Tucson, AZ	W 12–6	8,500	
*Non-conference game; ^{†}Homecoming

== NFL draft ==
Utah had two players selected in the 1942 NFL draft.

Player	Position	Round	Pick	NFL team
Floyd Spendlove	Tackle	8	61	Pittsburgh Steelers
Mac Speedie	End	15	135	Detroit Lions
