= Floyd Millet =

American sports player, coach (1911–2000)

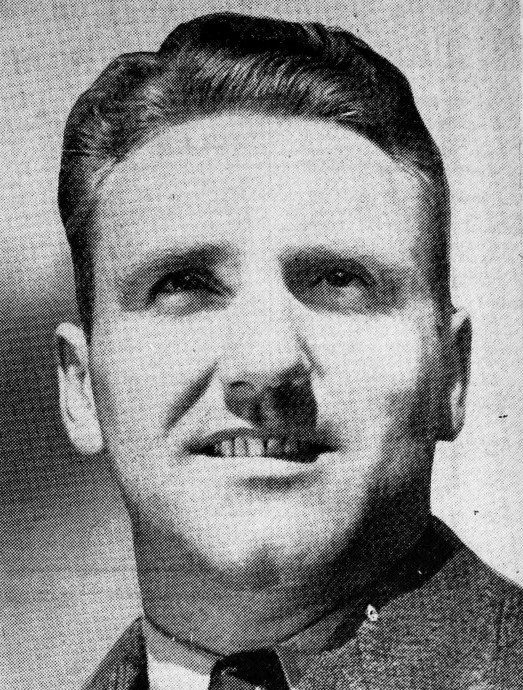

Biographical details
- Born: October 17, 1911; Mesa, Arizona, U.S.
- Died: June 17, 2000 (aged 88); Provo, Utah, U.S.

Playing career

Football
- 1932–1933: BYU

Basketball
- 1932–1933: BYU
- Positions: Fullback (football); Forward (basketball)

Coaching career (HC unless noted)

Football
- 1934–1936: Davis HS (UT)
- 1937–1941: BYU (assistant)
- 1942: BYU

Basketball
- 1934–1937: Davis HS (UT)
- 1941–1949: BYU

Baseball
- 1935–1937: Davis HS (UT)

Administrative career (AD unless noted)
- 1963–1970: BYU

Head coaching record
- Overall: 2–5 (college football); 104–77 (college basketball)

William Floyd Millet (October 17, 1911 – June 17, 2000) was an American football and basketball player, track and field athlete, coach of various sports, and college athletics administrator. Millet served as the head football coach at Brigham Young University (BYU) for one season in 1942, tallying a mark of 2–5. He was the head basketball coach at BYU from 1941 to 1949, compiling a record of 104–77. From 1963 to 1970, he served as the school's athletic director.

Millet was born in Mesa, Arizona and graduated from Mesa Union High School there. After attending Gila Junior College —now known as Eastern Arizona College— in Thatcher, Arizona, he moved on to BYU, where he lettered in basketball, football, and track, before graduating in 1934. In football and basketball, he earned all-conference honors. Millet received a master's degree from the University of Southern California (USC) in 1939.

Millet began his coaching career at Davis High School in Kaysville, Utah, where he spent three years as head coach in football and baseball and an assistant in basketball. He returned to BYU in 1937 as an assistant football coach.

== Personal life ==
Millet was married to Vera Jackson. They met during their mutual time at Brigham Young University (1929–1934). They were married by President George Albert Smith on August 13, 1934 and remained together for 66 years until Floyd's death in 2000. Vera lived to be 98, dying in 2007. According to her obituary, she "was a wonderful companion to Floyd throughout his coaching and athletic career and was always with him for the innumerable "away" games, meetings and other travels. She loved sports and knew teams, players and scores. She was the ultimate True Blue BYU Fan, seldom missing a football or basketball game, even in her 98th year." Both were active members of The Church of Jesus Christ of Latter-day Saints.

== Head coaching record ==
=== College football ===
Year	Team	Overall	Conference	Standing	Bowl/playoffs
BYU Cougars (Mountain States Conference) (1942)
1942	BYU	2–5	1–4	6th	
BYU:		2–5	1–4		
Total:		2–5			
