= Cac Hubbard =

American sports coach and college athletics administrator

Biographical details
- Born: September 13, 1896; Weiser, Idaho, U.S.
- Died: October 30, 1980 (aged 84); Portland, Oregon, U.S.

Playing career

Football
- 1916–1917: Oregon Agricultural
- 1919: Oregon Agricultural

Basketball
- 1919–1921: Oregon Agricultural

Baseball
- 1918–1921: Oregon Agricultural
- Position: End (football)

Coaching career (HC unless noted)

Football
- 1926–1928: Puget Sound
- 1932–1938: Denver (assistant)
- 1939–1941: Denver
- 1944–1947: Denver

Basketball
- 1932–1940: Denver

Baseball
- 1948: Denver

Administrative career (AD unless noted)
- 1941–1948: Denver
- 1949–1952: Montana

Head coaching record
- Overall: 45–35–10 (football)
- Bowls: 0–2

Accomplishments and honors

Championships
- 2 Mountain States (1945–1946)

Clyde Wesley "Cac" Hubbard (September 13, 1896 – October 30, 1980) was an American college football, college basketball, and college baseball coach and athletics administrator. Hubbard served as the head football coach at the College of Puget Sound—now known as the University of Puget Sound—from 1926 to 1928 and at the University of Denver from 1939 to 1941 and again from 1944 to 1947, compiling a career college football coaching record of 45–35–10. Hubbard was the head basketball coach at Denver from 1932 to 1940 and the school's baseball coach in 1948. He served as the athletic director at Denver from 1941 to 1948 and at the University of Montana from 1949 to 1952.

Hubbard graduated from Oregon State Agricultural College—now known as Oregon State University—in 1921. There he lettered in football, basketball, and baseball.

== Head coaching record ==
=== Football ===
Year	Team	Overall	Conference	Standing	Bowl/playoffs
Puget Sound Loggers (Northwest Conference) (1926–1928)
1926	Puget Sound	3–3	2–1	2nd	
1927	Puget Sound	3–4–1	1–2–1	4th	
1928	Puget Sound	5–3	3–2	T–2nd	
Puget Sound:		11–10–1	6–5–1		
Denver Pioneers (Mountain States Conference) (1939–1941)
1939	Denver	5–3–1	3–2–1	3rd	
1940	Denver	7–2–1	4–1–1	T–2nd	
1941	Denver	4–3–2	3–1–2	T–2nd	
Denver Pioneers (Mountain States Conference) (1944–1947)
1944	Denver	4–3–2	1–2–1	2nd	
1945	Denver	4–5–1	4–1	1st	L Sun
1946	Denver	5–5–1	4–1–1	T–1st	L Alamo
1947	Denver	5–4–1	3–2–1	2nd	
Denver:		34–25–9	22–10–7		
Total:		45–35–10			
National championship Conference title Conference division title or championship game berth
