= 1949 Utah State Aggies football team =

American college football season

1949 Utah State Aggies football
- Conference: Skyline Six Conference
- Record: 3–7 (1–3 Skyline Six)
- Head coach: George Melinkovich (1st season)
- Home stadium: Romney Stadium

1949 Skyline Six Conference football standings
	Conf.					Overall
Team	W		L		T	W		L		T
Wyoming $	5	–	0	–	0	9	–	1	–	0
Colorado A&M	4	–	1	–	0	9	–	1	–	0
Denver	2	–	2	–	0	4	–	6	–	0
Utah	2	–	3	–	0	2	–	7	–	1
Utah State	1	–	3	–	0	3	–	7	–	0
BYU	0	–	5	–	0	0	–	11	–	0
$ – Conference champion

The 1949 Utah State Aggies football team was an American football team that represented Utah State University in the Skyline Six Conference during the 1949 college football season. In their first season under head coach George Melinkovich, the Aggies compiled a 3–7 record (1–3 against Skyline opponents), finished fifth in the Skyline Six Conference, and were outscored by opponents by a total of 211 to 105.

Prior the 1949 season, Dick Romney retired as Utah State's head football coach after 30 years in the position.

== Schedule ==
Date	Opponent	Site	Result	Attendance	Source
September 17	at Washington State*	Rogers Field; Pullman, WA	L 0–33	9,500	
September 23	Pacific Fleet Submarine*	Romney Stadium; Logan, UT	W 26–7		
October 1	Montana*^{†}	Romney Stadium; Logan, UT	L 13–18	10,000	
October 15	at Wyoming	Corbett Field; Laramie, WY (rivalry)	L 0–27	8,823	
October 22	Colorado*	Romney Stadium; Logan, UT	L 7–20	4,000–7,000	
October 29	at Colorado A&M	Colorado Field; Fort Collins, CO	L 6–28		
November 5	at BYU	Cougar Stadium; Provo, UT (rivalry)	W 22–3		
November 12	Montana State*	Romney Stadium; Logan, UT	W 19–14		
November 24	at Utah	Ute Stadium; Salt Lake City, UT (rivalry)	L 0–34	22,771	
December 3	at Arizona State*	Goodwin Stadium; Tempe, AZ	L 12–27		
*Non-conference game; ^{†}Homecoming
