= 1949 Wyoming Cowboys football team =

American college football season

1949 Wyoming Cowboys football

Skyline Six champion
- Conference: Skyline Six Conference
- Record: 9–1 (5–0 Skyline Six)
- Head coach: Bowden Wyatt (3rd season)
- Captain: Carl Rollins
- Home stadium: Corbett Field

1949 Skyline Six Conference football standings
	Conf.					Overall
Team	W		L		T	W		L		T
Wyoming $	5	–	0	–	0	9	–	1	–	0
Colorado A&M	4	–	1	–	0	9	–	1	–	0
Denver	2	–	2	–	0	4	–	6	–	0
Utah	2	–	3	–	0	2	–	7	–	1
Utah State	1	–	3	–	0	3	–	7	–	0
BYU	0	–	5	–	0	0	–	11	–	0
$ – Conference champion

The 1949 Wyoming Cowboys football team was an American football team that represented the University of Wyoming as a member of the Skyline Six Conference during the 1949 college football season. In their third season under head coach Bowden Wyatt, the Cowboys compiled a 9–1 record (5–0 against Skyline Six opponents), won the Skyline Six championship, shut out six of ten opponents while averaging 38 points per game, and outscored all opponents by a total of 381 to 65. The conference championship was the first in the program's history.

On November 5, 1949, the Cowboys defeated Colorado State College in Greeley by a score of 103 to 0. The team established the program's single-game records that still stand for points scored (103), touchdowns (15) rushing yardage (504), and total yards (871).

Four Wyoming players were named to the Skyline Six All-Star team selected by the conference coaches for the Associated Press: tackle Charles Peterson; center Fred Taucher; fullback Walker "Sonny" Jones; and halfback Eddie Talboom. Carl Rollins was the team captain.

In 2000, Talboom, who played with the Cowboys from 1948 to 1950, became the first Wyoming player to be inducted into the College Football Hall of Fame. Head coach Bowden Wyatt was also inducted into the College Football Hall of Fame as a coach in 1997.

== Schedule ==
Date	Opponent	Site	Result	Attendance	Source
September 17	at Idaho State*	Spud Bowl; Pocatello, ID	W 58–13	5,000	
September 24	at New Mexico*	Zimmerman Field; Albuquerque, NM	W 41–14	12,000	
October 1	at Colorado A&M	Colorado Field; Fort Collins, CO (rivalry)	W 8–0	12,500	
October 8	vs. Montana State*	Daylis Stadium; Billings, MT (Midland Roundtable Grid Classic)	W 48–0		
October 15	Utah State	Corbett Field; Laramie, WY (rivalry)	W 27–0	8,823	
October 22	Utah	Corbett Field; Laramie, WY	W 13–0	8,000	
October 29	BYU	Corbett Field; Laramie, WY	W 45–0		
November 5	at Colorado State–Greeley*	Jackson Field; Greeley, CO	W 103–0		
November 12	at Baylor*	Municipal Stadium; Waco, TX	L 13–32		
November 24	at Denver	Hilltop Stadium; Denver, CO	W 25–6	30,121	
*Non-conference game
