= Clyde Carpenter =

American football player and coach (1908–1971)

Biographical details
- Born: April 17, 1908; Hudson, South Dakota, U.S.
- Died: December 5, 1971 (aged 63); Missoula, Montana, U.S.

Playing career
- 1928–1930: Montana

Coaching career (HC unless noted)
- 1932–1941: Billings HS (MT)
- 1942: Montana
- 1946–1949: Montana State
- 1953–1955: Gallatin County HS (MT)

Head coaching record
- Overall: 13–28–2 (college)
- Bowls: 0–0–1

Accomplishments and honors

Championships
- 1 RMC (1946)

Clyde Fitch Carpenter (April 17, 1908 – December 5, 1971) was an American football coach. He served as the head football coach at the University of Montana in 1942 and Montana State University from 1946 to 1949, compiling a career college football coach record of 13–28–2. Carpenter was the head football coach at Billings High School in Billings, Montana from 1932 to 1941. Carpenter was born on April 17, 1908, in Hudson, South Dakota. He died on December 5, 1971, at a hospital in Missoula, Montana.

== Head coaching record ==
=== College ===
Year	Team	Overall	Conference	Standing	Bowl/playoffs
Montana Grizzlies (Pacific Coast Conference) (1942)
1942	Montana	0–8	0–6	10th	
Montana:		0–8	0–6		
Montana State Bobcats (Rocky Mountain Conference) (1946–1949)
1946	Montana State	5–3–2	2–0–1	1st	T Harbor
1947	Montana State	4–5	1–0		
1948	Montana State	2–7			
1949	Montana State	2–5			
Montana State:		13–20–2			
Total:		13–28–2			
National championship Conference title Conference division title or championship game berth
