= Julius Wagner =

American football and wrestling coach (1905–1960)

Biographical details
- Born: May 1, 1905; Westcliffe, Colorado, U.S.
- Died: August 29, 1960 (aged 55); Pinedale, Wyoming, U.S.

Playing career

Football
- 1923–1925: Colorado Agricultural
- Position: Guard

Coaching career (HC unless noted)

Football
- 1927–1941: Colorado Agricultural/A&M (line)
- 1942–1946: Colorado A&M
- 1947–1955: Colorado A&M (freshmen)

Wrestling
- 1927–1955: Colorado A&M

Head coaching record
- Overall: 8–11–1 (football)

Julius Frank "Hans" Wagner (May 1, 1905 – August 29, 1960) was an American college football and wrestling coach. He served as the head football coach at Colorado State College of Agriculture and Mechanic Arts—now known as Colorado State University—from 1942 to 1946. Wagner was an outstanding player on the 1925 Colorado Agricultural football team of Harry W. Hughes. A native of Westcliffe, Colorado, Wagner was also one of the premier wrestlers in Colorado during the 1920s and following his graduation in 1927, he became the head coach of wrestling and assistant coach of football at Colorado Agricultural.

Wagner assisted Hughes from 1927 to 1941 in football, coaching the linemen and helping the Aggies win three conference championships, in 1927, 1933 and 1934. He won 23 conference championships in 29 years of coaching the Aggies wrestling team between 1927 and 1955. Following the resignation of Hughes in April 1942 as head football coach, Wagner took over the program, but his tenure was interrupted by the World War II. No football was played in 1943 and 1944. When football resumed in 1945, Wagner was unable to bring the glory back to Aggies football and resigned on October 22, 1946, midway through the season.

When Bob Davis took over as head football coach in 1947, Wagner continued as the head coach of freshman football team from 1947 to 1955, resigning his position in 1956 to become the director of new construction on the campus that became Colorado State University. He was killed at the age of 55 in an automobile accident, on August 29, 1960, in Pinedale, Wyoming.

== Head coaching record ==
=== Football ===
Year	Team	Overall	Conference	Standing
Colorado A&M Aggies (Mountain States Conference) (1942–1946)
1942	Colorado A&M	4–3	2–3	5th
1943	No team—World War II			
1944	No team—World War II			
1945	Colorado A&M	2–5–1	0–4	5th
1946	Colorado A&M	2–3	1–2	6th
Colorado A&M:		8–11–1	3–9	
Total:		8–11–1		
