= 1941 Utah State Aggies football team =

American college football season

1941 Utah State Aggies football
- Conference: Mountain States Conference
- Record: 0–8 (0–6 MSC)
- Head coach: Dick Romney (23rd season)
- Home stadium: Aggie Stadium

1941 Mountain States Conference football standings
	Conf.					Overall
Team	W		L		T	W		L		T
Utah $	4	–	0	–	2	6	–	0	–	2
BYU	3	–	1	–	2	4	–	3	–	2
Denver	3	–	1	–	2	4	–	3	–	2
Colorado A&M	3	–	2	–	1	4	–	2	–	1
Colorado	3	–	2	–	1	3	–	4	–	1
Wyoming	1	–	5	–	0	2	–	7	–	1
Utah State	0	–	6	–	0	0	–	8	–	0
$ – Conference champion

The 1941 Utah State Aggies football team was an American football team that represented Utah State Agricultural College in the Mountain States Conference (MSC) during the 1941 college football season. In their 23rd season under head coach Dick Romney, the Aggies compiled a 0–8 record (0–6 against MSC opponents), finished in last place in the MSC, and were outscored by a total of 153 to 46.

Utah State was ranked at No. 208 (out of 681 teams) in the final rankings under the Litkenhous Difference by Score System.

== Schedule ==
Date	Opponent	Site	Result	Attendance	Source
September 26	at San Jose State*	Spartan Stadium; San Jose, CA	L 0–30	9,000	
October 11	at Colorado	Colorado Stadium; Boulder, CO	L 7–13	7,500	
October 18	Idaho*	Aggie Stadium; Logan, UT	L 0–16	5,000	
October 25	Colorado A&M	Aggie Stadium; Logan, UT	L 6–7	5,000	
November 1	BYU	Aggie Stadium; Logan, UT (rivalry)	L 0–28	3,500	
November 8	Denver	Aggie Stadium; Logan, UT	L 6–14	2,500	
November 15	at Wyoming	Corbett Field; Laramie, WY (rivalry)	L 6–12		
November 20	at Utah	Ute Stadium; Salt Lake City, UT (rivalry)	L 21–33	10,000	
*Non-conference game
