= Denver Pioneers football, 1940–1949 =

American college football season

1940–1949 Denver Pioneers football
- Conference: Mountain States Conference (1940–1947), Skyline Six (1948–1949)
- Head coach: Cac Hubbard (1939–1941), Ellison Ketchum (1942), Mark Duncan (1943), Cac Hubbard & Adam Esslinger (1944), Cac Hubbard (1945–1947), Johnny Baker (1948–1952)

The Denver Ministers football program, 1940–1949 represented the University of Denver in college football during the 1940s as a member of the Mountain States Conference (1940–1947) and later the Skyline Six (1948–1949). The program was led by five head coaches during the decade: Cac Hubbard (1939–1941), Ellison Ketchum (1942), Mark Duncan (1943), Cac Hubbard and Adam Esslinger (1944), Cac Hubbard (1945–1947), and Johnny Baker (1948–1952).

Highlights of the decade included:

- The 1940 team compiled a 6–2–1 record (4–1–1 against conference opponents), tied for second place in the MSC, and outscored opponents by a total of 155 to 93.
- The 1942 team compiled a 6–3–1 and outscored opponents by a total of 182 to 98.
- The 1945 team compiled a 4–5–1 record (4–1 against MSC opponents), won the MSC championship, lost to New Mexico in the Sun Bowl, and outscored opponents by a total of 201 to 182.
- The 1946 team compiled a 5–5–1 record (4–1–1 against conference opponents), shared the MSC title with Utah State, lost to Hardin–Simmons in the 1947 Alamo Bowl, and was outscored by a total of 182 to 179.

== 1940 ==
1940 Denver Pioneers football
- Conference: Mountain States Conference
- Record: 6–2–1 (4–1–1 MSC)
- Head coach: Cac Hubbard (2nd season)
- Home stadium: Denver University Stadium

1940 Mountain States Conference football standings
	Conf.					Overall
Team	W		L		T	W		L		T
Utah $	5	–	1	–	0	7	–	2	–	0
Denver	4	–	1	–	1	6	–	2	–	1
Colorado	4	–	1	–	1	5	–	3	–	1
BYU	2	–	3	–	1	2	–	4	–	2
Colorado A&M	1	–	3	–	2	3	–	4	–	2
Utah State	2	–	4	–	0	2	–	5	–	1
Wyoming	0	–	5	–	1	1	–	7	–	1
$ – Conference champion

The 1940 Denver Pioneers football team represented the University of Denver as a member of the Mountain States Conference (MSC) during the 1940 college football season. In their second season under head coach Cac Hubbard, the Pioneers compiled a 6–2–1 record (4–1–1 against conference opponents), tied for second in the MSC, and outscored opponents by a total of 155 to 93.

Denver was ranked at No. 77 (out of 697 college football teams) in the final rankings under the Litkenhous Difference by Score system for 1940.

=== Schedule ===
Date	Opponent	Site	Result	Attendance	Source
September 27	Iowa State*	Denver University Stadium; Denver, CO	W 14–7	13,651	
October 4	Baylor*	Denver University Stadium; Denver, CO	L 7–14	16,000	
October 12	Colorado A&M^{†}	Denver University Stadium; Denver, CO	W 14–13	15,000	
October 19	Wyoming	Denver University Stadium; Denver, CO	W 41–9	11,000	
October 26	at Utah	Ute Stadium; Salt Lake City, UT	L 14–25		
November 9	at BYU	"Y" Stadium; Provo, UT	W 9–0	7,500	
November 16	Utah State	Denver University Stadium; Denver, CO	W 34–6		
November 21	Colorado	Denver University Stadium; Denver, CO	T 3–3		
December 14	at Hawaii*	Honolulu Stadium; Honolulu, Territory of Hawaii	W 19–16	22,000	
*Non-conference game; ^{†}Homecoming

== 1941 ==
1941 Denver Pioneers football
- Conference: Mountain States Conference
- Record: 4–3–2 (3–1–2 MSC)
- Head coach: Cac Hubbard (3rd season)
- Home stadium: Denver University Stadium

1941 Mountain States Conference football standings
	Conf.					Overall
Team	W		L		T	W		L		T
Utah $	4	–	0	–	2	6	–	0	–	2
BYU	3	–	1	–	2	4	–	3	–	2
Denver	3	–	1	–	2	4	–	3	–	2
Colorado A&M	3	–	2	–	1	4	–	2	–	1
Colorado	3	–	2	–	1	3	–	4	–	1
Wyoming	1	–	5	–	0	2	–	7	–	1
Utah State	0	–	6	–	0	0	–	8	–	0
$ – Conference champion

The 1941 Denver Pioneers football team represented the University of Denver as member of the Mountain States Conference (MSC) during the 1941 college football season. In their third season under head coach Cac Hubbard, the Pioneers compiled a 4–3–2 record (3–1–2 against conference opponents), tied for second place in RMC, and outscored opponents by a total of 141 to 46.

Denver was ranked at No. 86 (out of 681 teams) in the final rankings under the Litkenhous Difference by Score System for 1941.

=== Schedule ===
Date	Opponent	Site	Result	Attendance	Source
September 26	Iowa State*	Denver University Stadium; Denver, CO	L 6–7	14,137	
October 4	Baylor*	Denver University Stadium; Denver, CO	L 0–14		
October 10	BYU	Denver University Stadium; Denver, CO	L 7–13		
October 18	at Wyoming	Corbett Field; Laramie, WY	W 40–0		
October 25	Utah	Denver University Stadium; Denver, CO	T 0–0	14,000	
November 1	Colorado A&M	Denver University Stadium; Denver, CO	T 6–6	11,000	
November 8	at Utah State	Aggie Stadium; Logan, UT	W 14–6	2,500	
November 15	Colorado Mines*	Denver University Stadium; Denver, CO	W 41–0	9,000	
November 20	Colorado	Denver University Stadium; Denver, CO	W 27–0		
*Non-conference game

== 1942 ==
1942 Denver Pioneers football
- Conference: Mountain States Conference
- Record: 6–3–1 (3–2–1 MSC)
- Head coach: Ellison Ketchum (1st season)
- Home stadium: Hilltop Stadium

1942 Mountain States Conference football standings
	Conf.					Overall
Team	W		L		T	W		L		T
Colorado +	5	–	1	–	0	7	–	2	–	0
Utah +	5	–	1	–	0	6	–	3	–	0
Denver	3	–	2	–	1	6	–	3	–	1
Utah State	2	–	3	–	1	6	–	3	–	1
Colorado A&M	2	–	3	–	0	4	–	3	–	0
BYU	1	–	4	–	0	2	–	5	–	0
Wyoming	1	–	5	–	0	3	–	5	–	0
+ – Conference co-champions

The 1942 Denver Pioneers football team represented the University of Denver as member of the Mountain States Conference (MSC) during the 1942 college football season. In their first and only season under head coach Ellison Ketchum, the Pioneers compiled a 6–3–1 record (3–2–1 against conference opponents), finished third in the MSC, and outscored opponents by a total of 182 to 98.

Denver was ranked at No. 104 (out of 590 college and military teams) in the final rankings under the Litkenhous Difference by Score System for 1942.

=== Schedule ===
Date	Opponent	Site	Result	Attendance	Source
September 18	Colorado Mines*	Hilltop Stadium; Denver, CO	W 21–0		
September 25	Iowa State*	Hilltop Stadium; Denver, CO	L 0–7	7,073	
October 2	Kansas*	Hilltop Stadium; Denver, CO	W 17–0	8,000	
October 10	Colorado A&M	Hilltop Stadium; Denver, CO	W 26–0	> 12,800	
October 17	Wyoming	Hilltop Stadium; Denver, CO	W 17–14		
October 24	at Utah	Ute Stadium; Salt Lake City, UT	L 12–21	9,100	
October 31	Fort Douglas*	Hilltop Stadium; Denver, CO	W 44–6		
November 7	at BYU	Cougar Stadium; Provo, UT	W 26–6		
November 14	Utah State	Hilltop Stadium; Denver, CO	T 13–13	7,000	
November 26	Colorado	Hilltop Stadium; Denver, CO	L 6–31		
*Non-conference game

== 1943 ==
1943 Denver Pioneers football
- Conference: Mountain States Conference
- Record: 2–5 (0–0 MSC)
- Head coach: Mark Duncan (1st season)
- Home stadium: Hilltop Stadium

1943 Mountain States Conference football standings
	Conf.					Overall
Team	W		L		T	W		L		T
Colorado $	2	–	0	–	0	5	–	2	–	0
Utah	0	–	2	–	0	0	–	7	–	0
Denver	0	–	0	–	0	2	–	5	–	0
$ – Conference champion

The 1943 Denver Pioneers football team represented the University of Denver as member of the Mountain States Conference during the 1943 college football season. In their first and only season under head coach Mark Duncan, the Pioneers compiled a 2–5 record and were outscored by a total of 186 to 70.

In the final Litkenhous Ratings, Denver ranked 129th among the nation's college and service teams with a rating of 58.0.

=== Schedule ===
Date	Opponent	Site	Result	Attendance	Source
September 25	Colorado Mines*	Hilltop Stadium; Denver, CO	W 26–7		
October 1	Kansas*	Hilltop Stadium; Denver, CO	W 19–6		
October 8	at Colorado College*	Washburn Field; Colorado Springs, CO	L 0–41		
October 16	Fort Riley*	Hilltop Stadium; Denver, CO	L 0–47	5,000	
October 30	Marquette*	Hilltop Stadium; Denver, CO	L 6–45		
November 13	New Mexico*	Hilltop Stadium; Denver, CO	L 13–33		
November 25	Oklahoma A&M*	Hilltop Stadium; Denver, CO	L 6–7		
*Non-conference game

== 1944 ==
1944 Denver Pioneers football
- Conference: Mountain States Conference
- Record: 4–3–2 (2–1–1 MSC)
- Head coach: Adam Esslinger (1st season) & Cac Hubbard (4th season)
- Home stadium: DU Stadium

1944 Mountain States Conference football standings
	Conf.					Overall
Team	W		L		T	W		L		T
Colorado $	2	–	0	–	0	6	–	2	–	0
Denver	2	–	1	–	1	4	–	3	–	2
Utah	1	–	2	–	1	5	–	2	–	1
Utah State	0	–	2	–	0	3	–	3	–	0
$ – Conference champion

The 1944 Denver Pioneers football team represented the University of Denver as member of the Mountain States Conference (MSC) during the 1944 college football season. Led by head coaches Adam Esslinger and Cac Hubbard, the team compiled a 4–3–2 record (2–1–1 against conference opponents), finished second in the MSC, and outscored opponents by a total of 193 to 120.

=== Schedule ===
Date	Opponent	Site	Result	Attendance	Source
September 29	Kansas*	DU Stadium; Denver, CO	T 14–14		
October 6	Utah	DU Stadium; Denver, CO	W 28–12	12,000	
October 13	at Colorado College*	Washburn Field; Colorado Springs, CO	L 12–20	14,453	
October 21	Oklahoma A&M*	DU Stadium; Denver, CO	L 21–33		
October 28	Utah State	DU Stadium; Denver, CO	W 36–6	6,000	
November 4	at Utah	Ute Stadium; Salt Lake City, UT	T 0–0	7,000	
November 11	at New Mexico*	Hilltop Stadium; Albuquerque, NM	W 41–6		
November 23	Colorado	DU Stadium; Denver, CO	L 14–16		
December 2	Colorado College*	DU Stadium; Denver, CO	W 27–13	20,000	
*Non-conference game

== 1945 ==
1945 Denver Pioneers football

MSC champion

Sun Bowl, L 24–34 vs. New Mexico
- Conference: Mountain States Conference
- Record: 4–5–1 (4–1 MSC)
- Head coach: Cac Hubbard (5th season)
- Home stadium: Hilltop Stadium

1945 Mountain States Conference football standings
	Conf.					Overall
Team	W		L		T	W		L		T
Denver $	4	–	1	–	0	4	–	5	–	1
Colorado	3	–	1	–	0	5	–	3	–	0
Utah	3	–	2	–	0	4	–	4	–	0
Utah State	1	–	3	–	0	4	–	3	–	0
Colorado A&M	0	–	4	–	0	2	–	5	–	1
$ – Conference champion

The 1945 Denver Pioneers football team represented the University of Denver as member of the Mountain States Conference (MSC) during the 1945 college football season. In its fifth season under head coach Cac Hubbard, the team compiled a 4–5–1 record (4–1 against MSC opponents), won the MSC championship, lost to New Mexico in the Sun Bowl, and outscored all opponents by a total of 201 to 182.

Three Denver players were selected as first-team players on the All-Rocky Mountain football teams selected by the Associated Press (AP) or International News Service (INS): halfback Johnny Karamigios (AP-1; INS-1); guard Chet Latcham (AP-1; INS-1); and fullback John Adams (AP-1; INS-1). Other Denver player receiving mention included quarterback Bob Hazelhurst, end Wayne Flanigan, tackle George Miller, guard Leo Ford, and center Wes Webber.

=== Schedule ===
Date	Opponent	Site	Result	Attendance	Source
September 21	Colorado College*	Hilltop Stadium; Denver, CO	L 0–12	20,000	
September 28	Kansas*	Hilltop Stadium; Denver, CO	L 19–20	12,000	
October 6	Oklahoma A&M*	Hilltop Stadium; Denver, CO	L 7–31	20,000 (17,311 paid)	
October 12	Utah	Hilltop Stadium; Denver, CO	W 21–7	13,602	
October 19	at Drake*	Drake Stadium; Des Moines, IA	T 19–19	6,700	
October 27	Utah State^{†}	Hilltop Stadium; Denver, CO	W 41–6	11,020	
November 3	at Utah	Ute Stadium; Salt Lake City, UT	L 21–33	11,126	
November 10	Colorado A&M	Hilltop Stadium; Denver, CO	W 35–12	6,000	
November 22	Colorado	Hilltop Stadium; Denver, CO	W 14–8	> 25,000	
January 1, 1946	vs. New Mexico*	Kidd Field; El Paso, TX (Sun Bowl)	L 24–34	15,000	
*Non-conference game; ^{†}Homecoming

== 1946 ==
1946 Denver Pioneers football

MSC co-champion

Alamo Bowl, L 0–20 vs. Hardin–Simmons
- Conference: Mountain States Conference
- Record: 5–5–1 (4–1–1 MSC)
- Head coach: Cac Hubbard (6th season)
- Home stadium: DU Stadium

1946 Mountain States Conference football standings
	Conf.					Overall
Team	W		L		T	W		L		T
Utah State $	4	–	1	–	1	7	–	2	–	1
Denver $	4	–	1	–	1	5	–	5	–	1
Utah	4	–	2	–	0	8	–	3	–	0
Colorado	3	–	2	–	1	5	–	4	–	1
BYU	3	–	2	–	1	5	–	4	–	1
Colorado A&M	1	–	5	–	0	2	–	7	–	0
Wyoming	0	–	6	–	0	1	–	8	–	1
$ – Conference champion

The 1946 Denver Pioneers football team represented the University of Denver as member of the Mountain States Conference (MSC) during the 1946 college football season. In their sixth season under head coach Cac Hubbard, the Pioneers compiled a 5–5–1 record (4–1–1 against conference opponents), shared the MSC title with Utah State, and were outscored by a total of 182 to 179. They played in the 1947 Alamo Bowl, losing by at 20–0 score to Hardin–Simmons.

Three Denver players were selected by the International News Service as first-team players on the 1946 All-Mountain States football team: Bob Hazelhurst at back; Gregg Browning at end; and George MIller at tackle. End Jordan and back Karamagios were named to the second team.

=== Schedule ===
Date	Opponent	Site	Result	Attendance	Source
September 21	at Oklahoma A&M*	Lewis Field; Stillwater, OK	L 7–40	15,000	
September 27	Kansas*	DU Stadium; Denver, CO	L 13–21		
October 4	BYU	DU Stadium; Denver, CO	W 26–13		
October 11	Colorado A&M	DU Stadium; Denver, CO	W 33–0	15,000	
October 19	Utah	DU Stadium; Denver, CO	W 20–14	25,600	
October 26	at Texas Tech*	Tech Field; Lubbock, TX	L 6–21	11,000	
November 9	at Wyoming	Corbett Field; Laramie, WY	W 19–6	1,500	
November 16	at Colorado	Folsom Field; Boulder, CO	T 13–13	21,000	
November 28	Colorado College*	DU Stadium; Denver, CO	W 28-6	17,000	
December 7	Utah State	DU Stadium; Denver, CO	L 14–28	20,000	
January 4, 1947	vs. Hardin–Simmons*	Alamo Stadium; San Antonio, TX (Alamo Bowl)	L 0–20	3,730	
*Non-conference game

=== 1947 NFL draft ===
The 1947 NFL draft was held on December 16, 1946. The following Pioneers were selected.

Round	Pick	Player	Position	NFL club
10	77	Bob Hazelhurst	Halfback	Boston Yanks
32	296	Johnny Karamigios	Back	Chicago Cardinals

== 1947 ==
1947 Denver Pioneers football
- Conference: Mountain States Conference
- Record: 5–4–1 (3–2–1 MSC)
- Head coach: Cac Hubbard (7th season)
- Home stadium: Denver Stadium

1947 Mountain States Conference football standings
	Conf.					Overall
Team	W		L		T	W		L		T
Utah $	6	–	0	–	0	8	–	1	–	1
Denver	3	–	2	–	1	5	–	4	–	1
Utah State	3	–	3	–	0	6	–	5	–	0
Colorado	3	–	3	–	0	4	–	5	–	0
Colorado A&M	2	–	3	–	1	5	–	4	–	1
Wyoming	2	–	4	–	0	4	–	5	–	0
BYU	1	–	5	–	0	3	–	7	–	0
$ – Conference champion

The 1947 Denver Pioneers football team represented the University of Denver as member of the Mountain States Conference (MSC) during the 1947 college football season. In their seventh and final season under head coach Cac Hubbard, the Pioneers compiled a 5–4–1 record (3–2–1 against conference opponents), finished second in the MSC, and outscored opponents by a total of 153 to 138.

Denver was ranked at No. 95 (out of 500 college football teams) in the final Litkenhous Ratings for 1947.

The team played its home games at Denver Stadium in Denver.

=== Schedule ===
Date	Opponent	Site	Result	Attendance	Source
September 26	Kansas*	Denver Stadium; Denver, CO	L 0–9	28,000	
October 4	Oklahoma A&M*	Denver Stadium; Denver, CO	W 26–14		
October 11	Colorado A&M	Denver Stadium; Denver, CO	T 13–13	11,200	
October 18	at Utah	Ute Stadium; Salt Lake City, UT	L 7–13	21,248	
October 25	Texas Tech*	Denver Stadium; Denver, CO	L 7–36	17,947	
November 1	BYU	Denver Stadium; Denver, CO	W 20–6		
November 8	Wyoming	Denver Stadium; Denver, CO	W 27–7		
November 15	at Utah State	Aggie Stadium; Logan, UT	L 0–20		
November 27	Colorado	DU Stadium; Denver, CO	W 26–20	28,000	
December 13	at Hawaii*	Honolulu Stadium; Honolulu, Territory of Hawaii	W 27–0	> 5,000	
*Non-conference game

== 1948 ==
1948 Denver Pioneers football
- Conference: Skyline Six Conference
- Record: 4–5–1 (2–2 Skyline Six)
- Head coach: Johnny Baker (1st season)
- Home stadium: Hilltop Stadium

1948 Skyline Six Conference football standings
	Conf.					Overall
Team	W		L		T	W		L		T
Utah $	5	–	0	–	0	8	–	1	–	1
Colorado A&M	4	–	1	–	0	8	–	3	–	0
Denver	2	–	2	–	0	4	–	5	–	1
Utah State	2	–	3	–	0	5	–	6	–	0
BYU	1	–	3	–	0	5	–	6	–	0
Wyoming	0	–	5	–	0	4	–	5	–	0
$ – Conference champion

The 1948 Denver Pioneers football team represented the University of Denver as a member of the Skyline Six Conference during the 1948 college football season. In its first season under head coach Johnny Baker, the team compiled a 4–5–1 record (2–2 against conference opponents), finished third in the Skyline Six, and outscored opponents by a total of 174 to 166.

Denver was ranked at No. 92 in the final Litkenhous Difference by Score System ratings for 1948.

=== Schedule ===
Date	Opponent	Site	Result	Attendance	Source
September 18	Colorado Mines*	Hilltop Stadium; Denver, CO	W 33–0		
September 24	Kansas*	Hilltop Stadium; Denver, CO	L 0–40	25,070	
October 2	at Oklahoma A&M*	Lewis Field; Stillwater, OK	L 7–27	14,200	
October 9	Colorado A&M	Hilltop Stadium; Denver, CO	L 10–14	23,000	
October 16	Utah	Hilltop Stadium; Denver, CO	L 0–17	13,572	
October 23	Saint Mary's*	Hilltop Stadium; Denver, CO	L 22–33	15,712	
October 30	at Georgetown*	Griffith Stadium; Washington, DC	T 10–10	7,394	
November 6	Detroit*	Hilltop Stadium; Denver, CO	W 30–27		
November 13	Utah State	Hilltop Stadium; Denver, CO	W 41–6	13,297	
November 25	Wyoming	Hilltop Stadium; Denver, CO	W 13–0	20,000	
*Non-conference game

== 1949 ==
1949 Denver Pioneers football
- Conference: Skyline Six Conference
- Record: 4–6 (2–2 Skyline Six)
- Head coach: Johnny Baker (2nd season)
- Home stadium: Hilltop Stadium

1949 Skyline Six Conference football standings
	Conf.					Overall
Team	W		L		T	W		L		T
Wyoming $	5	–	0	–	0	9	–	1	–	0
Colorado A&M	4	–	1	–	0	9	–	1	–	0
Denver	2	–	2	–	0	4	–	6	–	0
Utah	2	–	3	–	0	2	–	7	–	1
Utah State	1	–	3	–	0	3	–	7	–	0
BYU	0	–	5	–	0	0	–	11	–	0
$ – Conference champion

The 1949 Denver Pioneers football team represented the University of Denver as a member of the Skyline Six Conference during the 1949 college football season. In their second season under head coach Johnny Baker, the Pioneers compiled a 4–6 record (2–2 against conference opponents), finished third in the Skyline Six, and were outscored by a total of 214 to 192.

=== Schedule ===
Date	Opponent	Site	Result	Attendance	Source
September 17	Colorado Mines*	Hilltop Stadium; Denver, CO	W 48–0	17,066	
September 24	Colorado A&M	Hilltop Stadium; Denver, CO	L 13–14	24,500	
October 1	Oklahoma A&M*	Hilltop Stadium; Denver, CO	L 2–48	> 20,000	
October 7	Hawaii*	Hilltop Stadium; Denver, CO	L 14–27	> 15,000	
October 15	at Utah	Ute Stadium; Salt Lake City, UT	W 20–18	23,917	
October 22	BYU	Hilltop Stadium; Denver, CO	W 35–7	13,900	
October 29	Arizona*	Hilltop Stadium; Denver, CO	W 20–6	13,259	
November 5	vs. Saint Mary's*	Grape Bowl; Lodi, CA	L 21–41		
November 12	Georgetown*	Hilltop Stadium; Denver, CO	L 13–28	15,000	
November 24	Wyoming*	Hilltop Stadium; Denver, CO	L 6–25	30,121	
*Non-conference game
