= 1949 Utah Utes football team =

American college football season

1949 Utah Utes football
- Conference: Skyline Six Conference
- Record: 2–7–1 (2–3 Skyline Six)
- Head coach: Ike Armstrong (25th season)
- Home stadium: Ute Stadium

1949 Skyline Six Conference football standings
	Conf.					Overall
Team	W		L		T	W		L		T
Wyoming $	5	–	0	–	0	9	–	1	–	0
Colorado A&M	4	–	1	–	0	9	–	1	–	0
Denver	2	–	2	–	0	4	–	6	–	0
Utah	2	–	3	–	0	2	–	7	–	1
Utah State	1	–	3	–	0	3	–	7	–	0
BYU	0	–	5	–	0	0	–	11	–	0
$ – Conference champion

The 1949 Utah Utes football team, or also commonly known as the Utah Redskins, was an American football team that represented the University of Utah as a member of the Skyline Six Conference during the 1949 college football season. In their 25th and final season under head coach Ike Armstrong, the Utes compiled an overall record of 2–7–1 with a mark of 2–3 against conference opponents, winning placing fourth in the Skyline Six.

== Schedule ==
Date	Time	Opponent	Site	Result	Attendance	Source
September 17		at Washington*	Husky Stadium; Seattle, WA	L 7–14	26,553	
September 24		at Oregon State*	Multnomah Stadium; Portland, OR	L 7–27	25,012	
October 1		at Arizona*	Arizona Stadium; Tucson, AZ	T 12–12	15,500	
October 8		BYU	Ute Stadium; Salt Lake City, UT (rivalry)	W 38–0		
October 15		Denver	Ute Stadium; Salt Lake City, UT	L 18–20	23,917	
October 22		at Wyoming	Corbett Field; Laramie, WY	L 0–13	8,000	
October 29		at Colorado*	Folsom Field; Boulder, CO (rivalry)	L 7–14	20,103	
November 5		Colorado A&M^{†}	Ute Stadium; Salt Lake City, UT	L 12–21		
November 12	9:15 p.m.	at No. 19 Pacific (CA)*	Grape Bowl; Lodi, CA	L 6–45	17,000	
November 24		Utah State	Ute Stadium; Salt Lake City, UT (rivalry)	W 34–0	22,771	
*Non-conference game; ^{†}Homecoming; Rankings from AP Poll released prior to the game; All times are in Mountain time

== After the season ==
=== NFL craft ===
Utah had one player selected in the 1950 NFL draft.

Player	Position	Round	Pick	NFL team
Joe Tangaro	Tackle	20	254	New York Giants
