= 1949 Montana State Bobcats football team =

American college football season

1949 Montana State Bobcats football
- Conference: Rocky Mountain Conference
- Record: 2–5 ( RMC)
- Head coach: Clyde Carpenter (4th season)
- Home stadium: Gatton Field

1949 Rocky Mountain Conference football standings
	Conf.					Overall
Team	W		L		T	W		L		T
Colorado College $	3	–	0	–	0	6	–	3	–	0
Colorado Mines	2	–	1	–	0	4	–	4	–	1
Western State (CO)	1	–	2	–	0	5	–	3	–	0
Colorado State–Greeley	0	–	3	–	0	0	–	8	–	0
$ – Conference champion

The 1949 Montana State Bobcats football team was an American football team that represented Montana State University in the Rocky Mountain Conference (RMC) during the 1949 college football season. In its fourth and final season under head coach Clyde Carpenter, the team compiled a 2–5 record.

== Schedule ==
Date	Time	Opponent	Site	Result	Attendance	Source
September 24	9:00 p.m.	Eastern Washington	Woodward Field; Cheney, WA	L 6–29	8,000	
September 30		Portland	Gatton Field; Bozeman, MTT	L 0–40	3,000	
October 8		vs. Wyoming	Daylis Stadium; Billings, MT (Midland Roundtable Grid Classic)	L 0–48		
October 15		Idaho State^{†}	Gatton Field; Bozeman, MT	W 19–14	4,000	
October 22		vs. North Dakota State	Glendive, MT	W 28–7		
October 29		vs. Montana	Naranche Stadium; Butte, MT (rivalry)	L 12–34		
November 12		at Utah State	Aggie Stadium; Logan, UT	L 14–19		
^{†}Homecoming; All times are in Mountain time
