= 1942 BYU Cougars football team =

American college football season

1942 BYU Cougars football
- Conference: Mountain States Conference
- Record: 2–5 (1–4 MSC)
- Head coach: Floyd Millet (1st season)
- Home stadium: BYU Stadium

1942 Mountain States Conference football standings
	Conf.					Overall
Team	W		L		T	W		L		T
Colorado +	5	–	1	–	0	7	–	2	–	0
Utah +	5	–	1	–	0	6	–	3	–	0
Denver	3	–	2	–	1	6	–	3	–	1
Utah State	2	–	3	–	1	6	–	3	–	1
Colorado A&M	2	–	3	–	0	4	–	3	–	0
BYU	1	–	4	–	0	2	–	5	–	0
Wyoming	1	–	5	–	0	3	–	5	–	0
+ – Conference co-champions

The 1942 BYU Cougars football team was an American football team that represented Brigham Young University (BYU) as a member of the Mountain States Conference (MSC) during the 1942 college football season. In their first and only season under head coach Floyd Millet, the Cougars compiled an overall record of 2–5 with a mark of 1–4 against conference opponents, tied for sixth in the MSC, and were outscored by a total of 133 to 55.

BYU was ranked at No. 193 (out of 590 college and military teams) in the final rankings under the Litkenhous Difference by Score System for 1942.

== Schedule ==
Date	Opponent	Site	Result	Attendance	Source
September 26	at Montana*	Dornblaser Field; Missoula, MT	W 12–6		
October 3	Wyoming	Cougar Stadium; Provo, UT	L 13–6	5,000	
October 10	at Utah	Ute Stadium; Salt Lake City, UT (rivalry)	W 12–7		
October 16	Fort Douglas*	Cougar Stadium; Provo, UT	L 24–13	3,000	
October 31	at Utah State	Aggie Stadium; Logan, UT (rivalry)	L 9–6	4,000	
November 7	Denver	Cougar Stadium; Provo, UT	L 26–6		
November 14	at Colorado	Colorado Stadium; Boulder, CO	L 48–0		
*Non-conference game
