= 1944 Colorado Buffaloes football team =

American college football season

1944 Colorado Buffaloes football
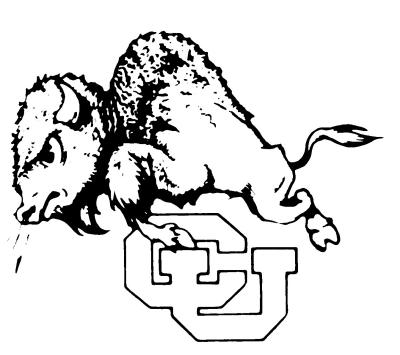

MSC champion
- Conference: Mountain States Conference
- Record: 6–2 (2–0 MSC)
- Head coach: Frank Potts (2nd season)
- Captain: Game captains
- Home stadium: Colorado Stadium

1944 Mountain States Conference football standings
	Conf.					Overall
Team	W		L		T	W		L		T
Colorado $	2	–	0	–	0	6	–	2	–	0
Denver	2	–	1	–	1	4	–	3	–	2
Utah	1	–	2	–	1	5	–	2	–	1
Utah State	0	–	2	–	0	3	–	3	–	0
$ – Conference champion

The 1944 Colorado Buffaloes football team was an American football team that represented the University of Colorado as a member of the Mountain States Conference (MSC) during the 1944 college football season. Frank Potts returned for his second season as head coach after having helmed the team in 1940. Colorado compiled an overall record of 6–2 with mark of 2–0 in conference play, winning the MSC title. The team's home field of Colorado Stadium was renamed Folsom Field in 1944, following the death of former head coach Fred Folsom.

== Schedule ==
Date	Opponent	Site	Result	Attendance	Source
September 23	Fort Warren*	Colorado Stadium; Boulder, CO	L 6–7		
September 30	Second Air Force*	Colorado Stadium; Boulder, CO	L 6–33		
October 14	at Utah	Ute Stadium; Salt Lake City, UT (rivalry)	W 26–0		
October 21	Colorado College*^{†}	Colorado Stadium; Boulder, CO	W 28–0		
November 4	vs. New Mexico*	Centennial High School Stadium; Pueblo, CO	W 39–0		
November 11	Peru State*	Colorado Stadium; Boulder, CO	W 40–12		
November 18	at Colorado College*	Washburn Field; Colorado Springs, CO	W 40–6	1,500	
November 23	at Denver	DU Stadium; Denver, CO	W 16–14		
*Non-conference game; ^{†}Homecoming

== After the season ==
=== NFL draft ===
The following Buffaloes were selected in 1945 NFL draft following the season.

Round	Pick	Player	Position	NFL club
22	222	Don Fabling	Back	Brooklyn Tigers
30	308	LaMar Dykstra	Back	Brooklyn Tigers
