= 1947 Utah Utes football team =

American college football season

1947 Utah Utes football

MSC champion
- Conference: Mountain States Conference
- Record: 8–1–1 (6–0 MSC)
- Head coach: Ike Armstrong (23rd season)
- Home stadium: Ute Stadium

1947 Mountain States Conference football standings
	Conf.					Overall
Team	W		L		T	W		L		T
Utah $	6	–	0	–	0	8	–	1	–	1
Denver	3	–	2	–	1	5	–	4	–	1
Utah State	3	–	3	–	0	6	–	5	–	0
Colorado	3	–	3	–	0	4	–	5	–	0
Colorado A&M	2	–	3	–	1	5	–	4	–	1
Wyoming	2	–	4	–	0	4	–	5	–	0
BYU	1	–	5	–	0	3	–	7	–	0
$ – Conference champion

The 1947 Utah Utes football team, or also commonly known as the Utah Redskins, was an American football team that represented the University of Utah as a member of the Mountain States Conference (MSC) during the 1947 college football season. In their 23rd season under head coach Ike Armstrong, the Utes compiled an overall record of 8–1–1 with a mark of 6–0 against conference opponents, winning the MSC title.

Utah was ranked at No. 80 (out of 500 college football teams) in the final Litkenhous Ratings for 1947.

== Schedule ==
Date	Opponent	Rank	Site	Result	Attendance	Source
September 27	Oregon State*		Ute Stadium; Salt Lake City, UT	W 7–6	22,175	
October 4	Hawaii*		Ute Stadium; Salt Lake City, UT	W 35–0	23,518	
October 11	BYU		Ute Stadium; Salt Lake City, UT (rivalry)	W 28–6	19,000	
October 18	Denver^{†}		Ute Stadium; Salt Lake City, UT	W 13–7	21,248	
October 25	at Wyoming		Corbett Field; Laramie, WY	W 26–7	7,000	
November 1	at Colorado		Folsom Field; Boulder, CO (rivalry)	W 13–7	22,000	
November 8	Colorado A&M		Ute Stadium; Salt Lake City, UT	W 19–0	11,181	
November 15	vs. Idaho	No. 18	Public School Field; Boise, ID	L 6–13	8,000	
November 27	Utah State		Ute Stadium; Salt Lake City, UT (rivalry)	W 40–14	29,132	
December 6	at Arizona*		Arizona Stadium; Tucson, AZ	T 20–20		
*Non-conference game; ^{†}Homecoming; Rankings from AP Poll released prior to the game

== Rankings ==
Ranking movements Legend: ██ Increase in ranking ██ Decrease in ranking — = Not ranked
	Week									
Poll	1	2	3	4	5	6	7	8	9	Final
AP	—	—	—	—	—	18	—	—	—	—

== NFL draft ==
Utah had three players selected in the 1948 NFL draft.

Player	Position	Round	Pick	NFL team
Barney Hafen	Defensive end	19	167	Detroit Lions
Frank Nelson	Back	20	179	Boston Yanks
Tally Stevens	End	22	202	Pittsburgh Steelers
