= 1942 Utah Utes football team =

American college football season

1942 Utah Utes football

MSC co-champion
- Conference: Mountain States Conference
- Record: 6–3 (5–1 MSC)
- Head coach: Ike Armstrong (18th season)
- Home stadium: Ute Stadium

1942 Mountain States Conference football standings
	Conf.					Overall
Team	W		L		T	W		L		T
Colorado +	5	–	1	–	0	7	–	2	–	0
Utah +	5	–	1	–	0	6	–	3	–	0
Denver	3	–	2	–	1	6	–	3	–	1
Utah State	2	–	3	–	1	6	–	3	–	1
Colorado A&M	2	–	3	–	0	4	–	3	–	0
BYU	1	–	4	–	0	2	–	5	–	0
Wyoming	1	–	5	–	0	3	–	5	–	0
+ – Conference co-champions

The 1942 Utah Utes football team, also commonly known as the Utah Redskins, was an American football team that represented the University of Utah as a member of the Mountain States Conference (MSC) during the 1942 college football season. In their 18th season under head coach Ike Armstrong, the Utes compiled an overall record of 6–3 with a mark of 5–1 against conference opponents, sharing the MSC title with Colorado.

Utah was ranked at No. 83 (out of 590 college and military teams) in the final rankings under the Litkenhous Difference by Score System for 1942.

== Schedule ==
Date	Opponent	Site	Result	Attendance	Source
September 26	Santa Clara*	Ute Stadium; Salt Lake City, UT	L 0–12	16,000	
October 3	at Arizona*	Arizona Stadium; Tucson, AZ	L 0–14	9,000	
October 10	BYU	Ute Stadium; Salt Lake City, UT (rivalry)	L 7–12		
October 17	at Utah State	Aggie Stadium; Logan, UT (rivalry)	W 34–6	4,000	
October 24	Denver^{†}	Ute Stadium; Salt Lake City, UT	W 21–12	9,100	
October 31	Colorado A&M	Ute Stadium; Salt Lake City, UT	W 33–14	4,000	
November 7	at Colorado	Colorado Stadium; Boulder, CO (rivalry)	W 13–0		
November 14	at Wyoming	Corbett Field; Laramie, WY	W 34–7		
November 26	Idaho*	Ute Stadium; Salt Lake City, UT	W 13–7	12,500	
*Non-conference game; ^{†}Homecoming

== NFL draft ==
Utah had two players selected in the 1943 NFL draft.

Player	Position	Round	Pick	NFL team
Bert Davis	Center	18	165	Cleveland Rams
Woody Peterson	Back	32	299	Chicago Bears
