= Gavin Hadden =

American architect (1888–1956)

- Born: May 22, 1888; New York, New York, United States
- Died: March 9, 1956 (aged 67); Washington, DC, United States
- Occupation: Architect

Gavin Hadden (May 22, 1888 – March 9, 1956) was an American architect. His work was part of the architecture event in the art competition at the 1932 Summer Olympics.

Hadden was born in New York City. He graduated from Harvard College in 1910 and Columbia University in 1912 with a degree in civil engineering. He was best known for his work on collegiate sports stadiums; other examples of his work include the Tennis House in Grosse Pointe Farms, Michigan.
