= Colorado Field =

Former college stadium in Colorado, US

- Location in the United States Location in Colorado
- Interactive map of Colorado Field
- Address: College & University Avenues
- Location: Colorado State University; Fort Collins, Colorado, U.S.
- Coordinates: 40.572°N 105.078°W
- Owner: Colorado State University
- Operator: Colorado State University
- Capacity: 14,000 (estimate) (1948–1967)
- Surface: Natural grass (First football field in Colorado built with grass)

Construction
- Groundbreaking: May 1912
- Opened: October 5, 1912; 113 years ago
- Closed: November 25, 1967; 58 years ago
- Demolished: Summer 1972; 54 years ago

Tenants
- Colorado State Rams (NCAA) (1912–1967)

Colorado Field was an outdoor college football stadium in the western United States, on the campus of Colorado State University in Fort Collins, Colorado. Opened in 1912, it was the home of the CSU Rams of the Western Athletic Conference (WAC) through 1967.

Constructed entirely by the students and faculty 114 years ago in 1912, Colorado Field was the first football field in the state of Colorado to have grass sod on the playing surface. Located at the corner of College Avenue and University Avenue, it was part of an athletic complex which included the field's cinder running track, an additional football practice field, a baseball field, volleyball courts, a basketball court, and a locker room facility. It replaced frequently muddy Durkee Field to the north, the site of the Glenn Morris Field House.

The Colorado Aggies won nine conference championships here between 1915 and 1955, with players such as Ralph "Sag" Robinson, Kenny Hyde, Julius Wagner, Thurman "Fum" McGraw, Jack Christiansen, Gary Glick, and Oscar Reed.

The football field had a conventional north-south alignment, at an approximate elevation of five thousand feet (1,525 m) above sea level.

Lights were added in 1948 for night games, but demand grew for an updated and larger stadium; Colorado Field's last season was in 1967, replaced by Hughes Stadium in 1968. Torn down in 1972, it had a rebirth in 1986 as "Jack Christiansen Track," the home of the CSU track and field team.

== Capacity ==
- 1912–1920: 1,000 steel bleachers and temporary bleachers as needed
- 1921–1924: 5,400 seat wooden grandstand and 2,000 temporary wooden bleachers
- 1925–1929: 7,500 permanent seats
- 1929–1947: 10,000
- 1948–1967: 14,000 maximum capacity with temporary bleachers in the end zones
