= DU Stadium =

Stadium in Colorado, United States

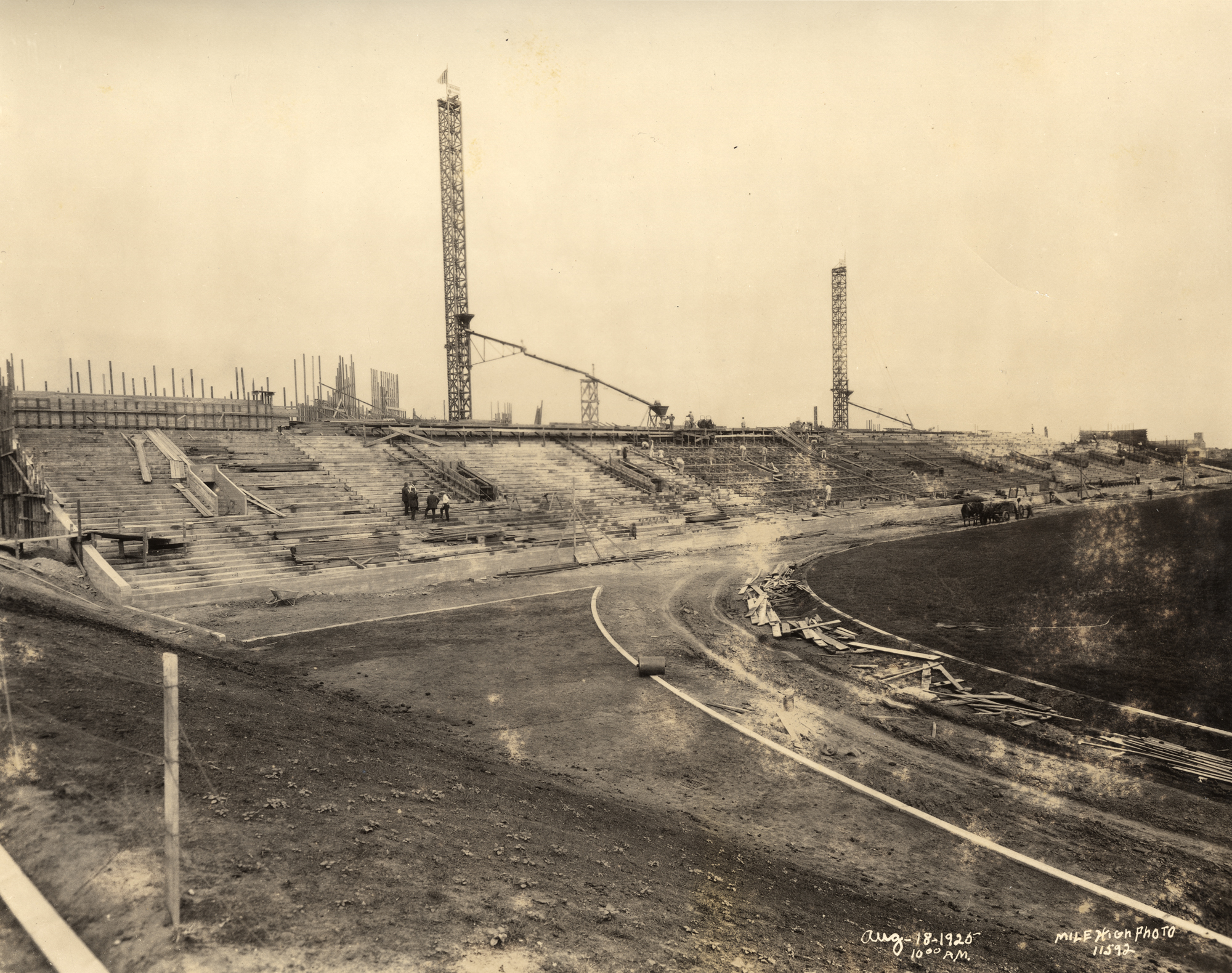

- Location in the United States Location in Colorado
- Interactive map of DU Stadium
- Full name: DU Stadium
- Former names: Hilltop Stadium
- Location: University of Denver; Denver, Colorado, U.S.
- Coordinates: 39.6815°N 104.963°W
- Owner: University of Denver
- Operator: University of Denver
- Capacity: 30,000
- Surface: Natural grass

Construction
- Groundbreaking: March 1925
- Opened: October 2, 1926; 100 years ago
- Demolished: 1971
- Cost: $571,000 ($10.4 million in 2025)
- Architect: Gavin Hadden

Tenants
- Denver Pioneers (NCAA) (1926–1960); Air Force Falcons (NCAA) (1955–1961); Denver Broncos (AFL) (1960)

DU Stadium, sometimes referred to as Hilltop Stadium, was a stadium in the western United States, located on the campus of the University of Denver in Denver, Colorado. Built 100 years ago in 1926, the crescent-shaped main grandstand design on the west sideline was based on other similar-sized stadiums from the same time period, Brown Stadium and Cornell's Schoellkopf Field, both in the Ivy League, as well as Northwestern University's Dyche Stadium.

It hosted Denver Pioneers football until the program was discontinued in early 1961, due to mounting deficits. The stadium had a seating capacity of 30,000 at its peak, and the natural grass field had a conventional north–south orientation at an elevation of 5,350 feet (1,630 m) above sea level. Nearly half a century in age, it was torn down in the early 1970s.

== Stadium history ==
DU played its first football game in 1885, and by 1909 had moved to a 10,000-seat grandstand in University Park. By 1924, DU football had outgrown that grandstand, and DU alumni decided to launch an ambitious public bond drive to fund a new stadium. The university broke ground for Hilltop Stadium in March 1925.

=== Construction ===
The construction costs ran just under $571,000, with the project using one million board-feet of lumber, 7,000 cubic feet (200 m^{3}) of concrete and 295 tons of steel. Gavin Hadden, an engineer whose office was in New York City, designed the stadium; he also designed the football stadiums at Cornell, Brown, and Northwestern. The community called the new structure by the nickname "Monument to Concrete." The famous sculptor Robert Garrison created two massive figures of athletes, one male and one female, for the stadium's main entrance as symbols of the value of coeducation and “the vitality, the vigor, and the strength of modern American youth”.

In the venue's first official game on October 2, 1926, DU defeated Colorado School of Mines 27–7. However, no regional match-up overshadowed the annual rivalry game between DU and the University of Colorado, Boulder (CU) on Thanksgiving Day. This Front Range tradition came to end when CU moved to the Big Seven Conference in 1948. The facility also hosted other sports during its history, including soccer and track and field.

The use of Hilltop Stadium extended beyond the realm of athletic competition as well: aviator Charles Lindbergh visited the Denver landmark during a parade held in his honor in 1927, several months after his solo transatlantic flight. Hilltop Stadium also hosted outdoor theater productions and DU commencement ceremonies for a number of years.

The U.S. Air Force Academy Falcons shared the stadium with DU until their new Falcon Stadium opened in Colorado Springs in 1962. Additionally, the professional Denver Broncos, a charter AFL franchise, played eleven pre-season and two early regular season games at DU stadium in the early and mid-1960s. Perhaps the most famous of those DU-hosted Bronco games was the 1967 pre-season game on August 5, when the Broncos beat the Detroit Lions in the first inter-league exhibition game. The Broncos' home venue, Bears Stadium (later renamed "Mile High"), was shared with the Triple-A Denver Bears baseball club of the American Association (and Pacific Coast League).

=== Demolition ===
The university decided to demolish Hilltop Stadium in 1971. The venue had started to crumble, and after the discontinuation of the DU football program in January 1961, a costly reconstruction of the main grandstand seemed unwarranted. Although the large crescent-shaped section on the west side was removed, the far smaller section to the east remained until 1974.

DU also needed the space for its growing intramural sports program: new plans included ten lighted tennis courts and three regulation-sized playing fields for a wide variety of sports. Today, the Benjamin F. Stapleton, Jr. Tennis Pavilion, Diane Wendt Sports Field, University of Denver Soccer Stadium and Peter Barton Lacrosse Stadium all stand on the site of the old Hilltop Stadium.

The old line markers are still housed at the Anderson Academic Commons, formerly the Penrose Library on the DU campus. For many years after the DU stadium was demolished, the 1930s DU stadium light towers were donated and served the Englewood (Colo.) High School stadium, but recent (2020s) renovations have seen the old towers removed for more modern lighting.

== Bibliography ==
- Fisher, Steve. “The Short, Happy Life of Hilltop Stadium.” University of Denver Magazine. Winter 2006. 3 Oct. 2008.
- Haraway, Frank O. “Football.” A Tribute to Champions. Ed. Erik Prenzler. Denver: Mile High Alumni Boosters, 1985. 8-10.
- Moffett, Jessie. “Statues Will Be Placed in Niches by October 25, Sculptor Announces.” The Clarion 26 September 1926: 3.
- “Say Goodbye to an Oldtimer….” Communiqué (DU Faculty and Staff Publication) 21 June 1971.
