= Skyline Conference (1938–1962) =

Former college athletic conference in the Western United States

- Formerly: Colloquially: Big Seven; Skyline Six; Skyline Eight
- Association: NCAA
- Founded: 1937; 89 years ago
- Folded: 1962; 64 years ago
- Commissioner: Dick Romney (1949–1960); Paul Brechler (1960–1962)
- Division: University Division
- No. of teams: 7 (1937–1947); 6 (1947–1951); 8 (1951–1962)
- Region: Western United States

Locations
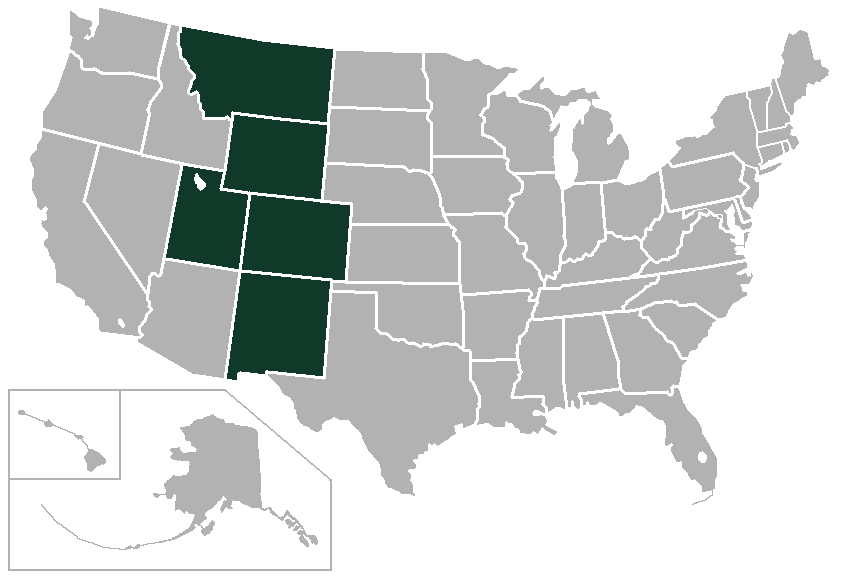

The Skyline Conference was a college athletic conference based in the Western United States that was active from December 1937 to June 1962. The conference's formal name was the Mountain States Athletic Conference, although it was also known as the Mountain States Conference along with informal but popular nicknames. It is unrelated to the contemporary Skyline Conference that is active in NCAA Division III in the New York City area.

== History ==
The conference began operating on December 3, 1937, when most of the larger schools in the Rocky Mountain Conference left to form a new conference. The seven charter members of the conference were: BYU, Colorado, Colorado A&M (now Colorado State), Denver, Utah, Utah State, and Wyoming. At the time of formation, the formal name of Mountain States Athletic Conference was adopted, although newspapers were already calling it the Big Seven at that time. The conference became popularly known as the Skyline Conference or Skyline Six after Colorado left in 1947. Colorado joined the Missouri Valley Intercollegiate Athletic Association (MVIAA), informally known as the Big Six Conference, which took over the Big Seven name and would later become the Big Eight Conference.

The conference became known as the Skyline Eight after New Mexico and Montana joined in 1951. The conference officially dissolved as of July 1, 1962, after four of its members (BYU, New Mexico, Utah, and Wyoming) departed to form the Western Athletic Conference (WAC). Montana operated as an independent for one football season in 1962 until the formation of the Big Sky Conference in 1963. Colorado State became independent until it joined the WAC in 1968. Utah State operated as an independent for fifteen seasons, until it joined the Pacific Coast Athletic Association (later named the Big West Conference) in 1977.

The conference first had a full-time commissioner in 1949, appointing Dick Romney, who had led the Utah State Aggies football program since 1919. He was succeeded in August 1960 by Paul Brechler, who had been athletic director at the University of Iowa. Brechler served as commissioner until the conference disbanded, and became the first commissioner of the WAC.

== Member schools ==
=== Final members ===
Institution	Location	Founded	Affiliation	Enrollment	Nickname	Joined (Note: Represents the calendar year when fall sports competition begins.)	Left (Note: Represents the calendar year when spring sports competition ends.)	Subsequent conference(s)	Current conference(s)
Brigham Young University	Provo, Utah	1875	Private	34,100	Cougars	1937	1962	various (Note: Brigham Young (BYU) had joined the following subsequent conferences: the Western Athletic Conference (WAC) from 1962–63 to 1998–99; the Mountain West Conference (MW) from 1999–2000 to 2010–11; and the West Coast Conference (WCC) from 2011–12 to 2022–23.)	Big 12 (2023–present)
Colorado State University (Note: Formerly known as Colorado State College of Agriculture and Mechanic Arts until 1957.)	Fort Collins, Colorado	1870	Public	34,166	Rams	1937	1962	FBS Independent (1962–1968); Western (WAC) (1968–1999)	Mountain West (MW) (1999–2026) (Pac-12 in 2026)
University of Denver (Note: Denver dropped football after the 1960 fall season (1960–61 school year).)	Denver, Colorado	1864	Private	11,952	Pioneers	1937	1962	various (Note: Denver had joined the following subsequent conferences: as an NCAA D-I Independent from 1962–63 to 1978–79, and during the 1998–99 school year; as an NAIA Independent from 1979–80 to 1989–90; the Colorado Athletic Conference (CAC) of NCAA D-II from 1990–91 to 1995–96; as an NCAA D-II Independent from 1996–97 to 1997–98; the Sun Belt Conference from 1999–2000 to 2011–12; and the Western Athletic Conference (WAC) during the 2012–13 school year.)	Summit (2013–26) (WCC in 2026)
University of Montana (Note: Montana joined the Mountain States after a year of independent play during the 1950–51 school year following several decades of membership in the Pacific Coast Conference (PCC).)	Missoula, Montana	1893	Public	10,104	Grizzlies	1951	1962	FBS Independent (1962–1963)	Big Sky (BSC) (1963–present)
University of New Mexico (Note: New Mexico joined the Mountain States from the Border Conference.)	Albuquerque, New Mexico	1889	Public	25,441	Lobos	1951	1962	Western (WAC) (1962–1999)	Mountain West (MW) (1999–present)
University of Utah	Salt Lake City, Utah	1850	Public	33,000	Utes	1937	1962	various (Note: Utah had joined the following subsequent conferences: the Western Athletic Conference (WAC) from 1962–63 to 1998–99; the Mountain West Conference (MW) from 1999–2000 to 2010–11; and the Pacific-12 Conference (Pac-12) from 2011–12 to 2023–24.)	Big 12 (2024–present)
Utah State University (Note: Formerly known as Utah State Agricultural College until 1957.)	Logan, Utah	1888	Public	27,691	Aggies	1937	1962	various (Note: Utah State had joined the following subsequent conferences: as an NCAA D-I FBS Independent from 1962–63 to 1977–78; the Pacific Coast Athletic Association (PCAA; now the Big West Conference [BWC]) from 1978–79 to 2004–05; and the Western Athletic Conference (WAC) from 2005–06 to 2012–13.)	Mountain West (MW) (2013–26) (Pac-12 in 2026)
University of Wyoming	Laramie, Wyoming	1886	Public	12,450	Cowboys & Cowgirls	1937	1962	Western (WAC) (1962–1999)	Mountain West (MW) (1999–present)

=== Former members ===
Institution	Location	Founded	Affiliation	Enrollment	Joined (Note: Represents the calendar year when fall sports competition begins.)	Left (Note: Represents the calendar year when spring sports competition ends.)	Nickname	Subsequent conference(s)	Current conference(s)
University of Colorado	Boulder, Colorado	1876	Public	33,246	1937	1947	Buffaloes	Big 8 (1947–1996); Pac-12 (2011–2024)	Big 12 (1996–2011, 2024–present)

== List of champions ==
=== Football ===
- 1938 – Utah
- 1939 – Colorado
- 1940 – Utah
- 1941 – Utah
- 1942 – Utah and Colorado
- 1943 – Colorado
- 1944 – Colorado
- 1945 – Denver
- 1946 – Denver and Utah State
- 1947 – Utah
- 1948 – Utah
- 1949 – Wyoming
- 1950 – Wyoming
- 1951 – Utah
- 1952 – Utah
- 1953 – Utah
- 1954 – Denver
- 1955 – Colorado A&M
- 1956 – Wyoming
- 1957 – Utah
- 1958 – Wyoming
- 1959 – Wyoming
- 1960 – Wyoming and Utah State
- 1961 – Wyoming and Utah State

=== Men's basketball ===
Pre-Skyline

- 1910–11 – Colorado School of Mines
- 1911–12 – Colorado School of Mines
- 1912–13 – Colorado
- 1913–14 – Colorado
- 1914–15 – Denver
- 1915–16 – Colorado, Colorado College
- 1916–17 – Colorado College
- 1917–18 – Colorado
- 1918–19 – Colorado
- 1919–20 – Colorado
- 1920–21 – Colorado
- 1921–22 – Colorado College
- 1922–23 – Colorado College
- 1923–24 – Colorado College (Colorado)
- 1924–25 – Colorado College (Eastern), BYU (Western)
- 1925–26 – Colorado State (Eastern), Northern Colorado (Eastern), Utah (Western), Utah State (Western)
- 1926–27 – Colorado College (Eastern), Montana State (Western)
- 1927–28 – Wyoming (Eastern), Montana State (Western)
- 1928–29 – Colorado (Eastern), Montana State (Western)
- 1929–30 – Colorado (Eastern), Montana State (Western), Utah State (Western)
- 1930–31 – Wyoming (Eastern), Utah (Western)
- 1931–32 – Wyoming (Eastern), BYU (Western), Utah (Western)
- 1932–33 – Colorado State (Eastern), Wyoming (Eastern), BYU (Western), Utah (Western)
- 1933–34 – Wyoming (Eastern), BYU (Western)
- 1934–35 – Northern Colorado (Eastern), Utah State (Western)
- 1935–36 – Wyoming (Eastern), Utah State (Western)
- 1936–37 – Colorado (Eastern), Denver (Eastern), Montana State (Western), Utah (Western)
- 1937–38 – Colorado, Utah

Skyline

- 1938–39 – Colorado
- 1939–40 – Colorado
- 1940–41 – Wyoming
- 1941–42 – Colorado
- 1942–43 – Wyoming
- 1943–44 – N/A
- 1944–45 – Utah
- 1945–46 – Wyoming
- 1946–47 – Wyoming
- 1947–48 – BYU
- 1948–49 – Wyoming
- 1949–50 – BYU
- 1950–51 – BYU
- 1951–52 – Wyoming
- 1952–53 – Wyoming
- 1953–54 – Colorado State
- 1954–55 – Utah
- 1955–56 – Utah
- 1956–57 – BYU
- 1957–58 – Wyoming
- 1958–59 – Utah
- 1959–60 – Utah
- 1960–61 – Colorado State, Utah
- 1961–62 – Utah

== See also ==
- List of Skyline Conference (1938–1962) football standings
- List of defunct college football conferences
