= List of New Mexico State Aggies head football coaches =

List of head football coaches for the New Mexico State Aggies

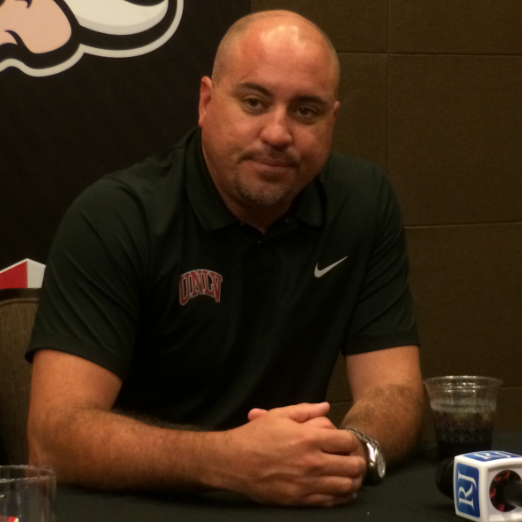
Tony Sanchez has served as head coach of the Aggies since December 2023.

The New Mexico State Aggies college football team represents New Mexico State University in Conference USA (CUSA), as part of the NCAA Division I Football Bowl Subdivision. The program has had 36 head coaches since it began play during the 1893 season. Since December 2023, Tony Sanchez has served as head coach at New Mexico State.

Four coaches have led New Mexico State in postseason bowl games: Jerry Hines, Warren B. Woodson, Doug Martin, and Jerry Kill. Four coaches have won conference championships: Hines and Woodson each won one as a member of the Border Conference and Jim Bradley and Gil Krueger each won one as a member of the Missouri Valley Conference.

Hines is the leader in seasons coached, with 11 years as head coach. Woodson is the leader games coached (102) and won (63). Maurice Moulder and Alfred Holt have the highest winning percentage at 1.000. Mike Knoll has the lowest winning percentage of those who have coached more than one game, with 0.091. Of the 36 different head coaches who have led the Aggies, Woodson has been inducted into the College Football Hall of Fame.

== Key ==
Key to symbols in coaches list
General		Overall		Conference		Postseason (Note: Although the first Rose Bowl Game was played in 1902, it has been continuously played since the 1916 game, and is recognized as the oldest bowl game by the NCAA. "—" indicates any season prior to 1916 when postseason games were not played.)	
No.	Order of coaches (Note: A running total of the number of head coaches, with coaches who served separate tenures being counted only once. Interim head coaches are represented with "Int" and are not counted in the running total. "—" indicates the team played but either without a coach or no coach is on record. "X" indicates an interim year without play.)	GC	Games coached	CW	Conference wins	PW	Postseason wins
DC	Division championships	OW	Overall wins	CL	Conference losses	PL	Postseason losses
CC	Conference championships	OL	Overall losses	CT	Conference ties	PT	Postseason ties
NC	National championships	OT	Overall ties (Note: Overtime rules in college football were introduced in 1996, making ties impossible in the period since.)	C%	Conference winning percentage		
†	Elected to the College Football Hall of Fame	O%	Overall winning percentage (Note: When computing the win–loss percentage, a tie counts as half a win and half a loss.)				

== Coaches ==
List of head football coaches showing season(s) coached, overall records, conference records, postseason records, championships and selected awards (Note: Statistics correct as of the end of the 2025 NCAA Division I FBS football season.)
No.	Name (Note: New Mexico State did not have a head coach for their 1896 season.)	Year(s) (Note: New Mexico State did not field a team for their 1894, 1918, and 1944–1945 seasons.)	Seasons	GC	OW	OL	OT	O%	CW	CL	CT	C%	PW	PL	PT	CC	NC	Awards
1	William M. Clute	1893	1	1	0	1	0	.000	—	—	—	—	—	—	—	—	0	—
2	Alfred Holt	1895	1	2	2	0	0	1.000	—	—	—	—	—	—	—	—	0	—
3	Charles M. Barber	1897–1898	2	5	3	1	1	0.700	—	—	—	—	—	—	—	—	0	—
4	John O. Miller	1899; 1901–1907	1, 7	24	16	4	4	0.750	—	—	—	—	—	—	—	—	0	—
5	William A. Sutherland	1900	1	7	3	3	1	0.500	—	—	—	—	—	—	—	—	0	—
6	William G. Hummell	1908	1	6	4	2	0	0.667	—	—	—	—	—	—	—	—	0	—
7	John H. Squires	1909	1	5	1	3	1	0.300	—	—	—	—	—	—	—	—	0	—
8	Art Badenoch	1910–1913	4	26	22	3	1	0.865	—	—	—	—	—	—	—	—	0	—
9	Clarence W. Russell	1914–1916	3	21	11	8	2	0.571	—	—	—	—	—	—	—	—	0	—
10	John G. Griffith	1917	1	6	4	2	0	0.667	—	—	—	—	—	—	—	—	0	—
11	Anthony Savage	1919	1	6	2	3	1	0.417	—	—	—	—	—	—	—	—	0	—
12	Dutch Bergman	1920–1922	3	18	12	5	1	0.694	—	—	—	—	—	—	—	—	0	—
13	R. R. Brown	1923–1925	3	28	21	6	1	0.768	—	—	—	—	—	—	—	—	0	—
14	Arthur Burkholder	1926	1	9	5	3	1	0.611	—	—	—	—	—	—	—	—	0	—
15	Ted Coffman	1927–1928	2	17	7	10	0	0.412	—	—	—	—	—	—	—	—	0	—
16	Jerry Hines	1929–1939	11	100	54	36	10	0.590	18	18	4	0.500	0	0	1	1	0	—
17	Julius H. Johnston	1940–1942	3	27	6	21	0	0.222	1	16	0	0.059	0	0	0	0	0	—
18	Maurice Moulder	1943	1	4	4	0	0	1.000	0	0	0	–	0	0	0	0	0	—
19	Raymond A. Curfman	1946–1947	2	19	8	11	0	0.421	2	8	0	0.200	0	0	0	0	0	—
20	Vaughn Corley	1948–1950	3	29	9	20	0	0.310	2	12	0	0.143	0	0	0	0	0	—
21	Joseph T. Coleman	1951–1952	2	19	3	15	1	0.184	2	6	1	0.278	0	0	0	0	0	—
22	James Patton	1953–1954	2	18	2	16	0	0.111	1	8	0	0.111	0	0	0	0	0	—
23	Tony Cavallo	1955–1957	3	30	7	23	0	0.233	0	12	0	.000	0	0	0	0	0	—
24	Warren B. Woodson^{†}	1958–1967	10	102	63	36	3	0.632	9	6	0	0.600	2	0	0	1	0	—
25	Jim Wood	1968–1972	5	52	21	30	1	0.413	1	4	0	0.200	0	0	0	0	0	—
26	Jim Bradley	1973–1977	5	55	23	31	1	0.427	12	10	1	0.543	0	0	0	1	0	—
27	Gil Krueger	1978–1982	5	55	17	37	1	0.318	10	18	1	0.362	0	0	0	1	0	—
28	Fred Zechman	1983–1985	3	33	9	24	0	0.273	4	15	0	0.211	0	0	0	0	0	—
29	Mike Knoll	1986–1989	4	44	4	40	0	0.091	1	27	0	0.036	0	0	0	0	0	—
30	Jim Hess	1990–1996	7	77	22	55	0	0.286	15	32	0	0.319	0	0	0	0	0	—
31	Tony Samuel	1997–2004	8	91	34	57	—	0.374	15	11	—	0.577	0	0	—	0	0	—
32	Hal Mumme	2005–2008	4	49	11	38	—	0.224	4	28	—	0.125	0	0	—	0	0	—
33	DeWayne Walker	2009–2012	4	50	10	40	—	0.200	4	25	—	0.138	0	0	—	0	0	—
34	Doug Martin	2013–2021	9	99	25	74	—	0.253	10	22	—	0.313	1	0	—	0	0	—
35	Jerry Kill	2022–2023	2	28	17	11	—	0.607	7	1	—	0.875	1	1	—	0	0	—
36	Tony Sanchez	2024–present	2	24	7	17	—	0.292	4	12	—	0.250	0	0	—	0	0	—
