= List of Wyoming Cowboys football seasons =

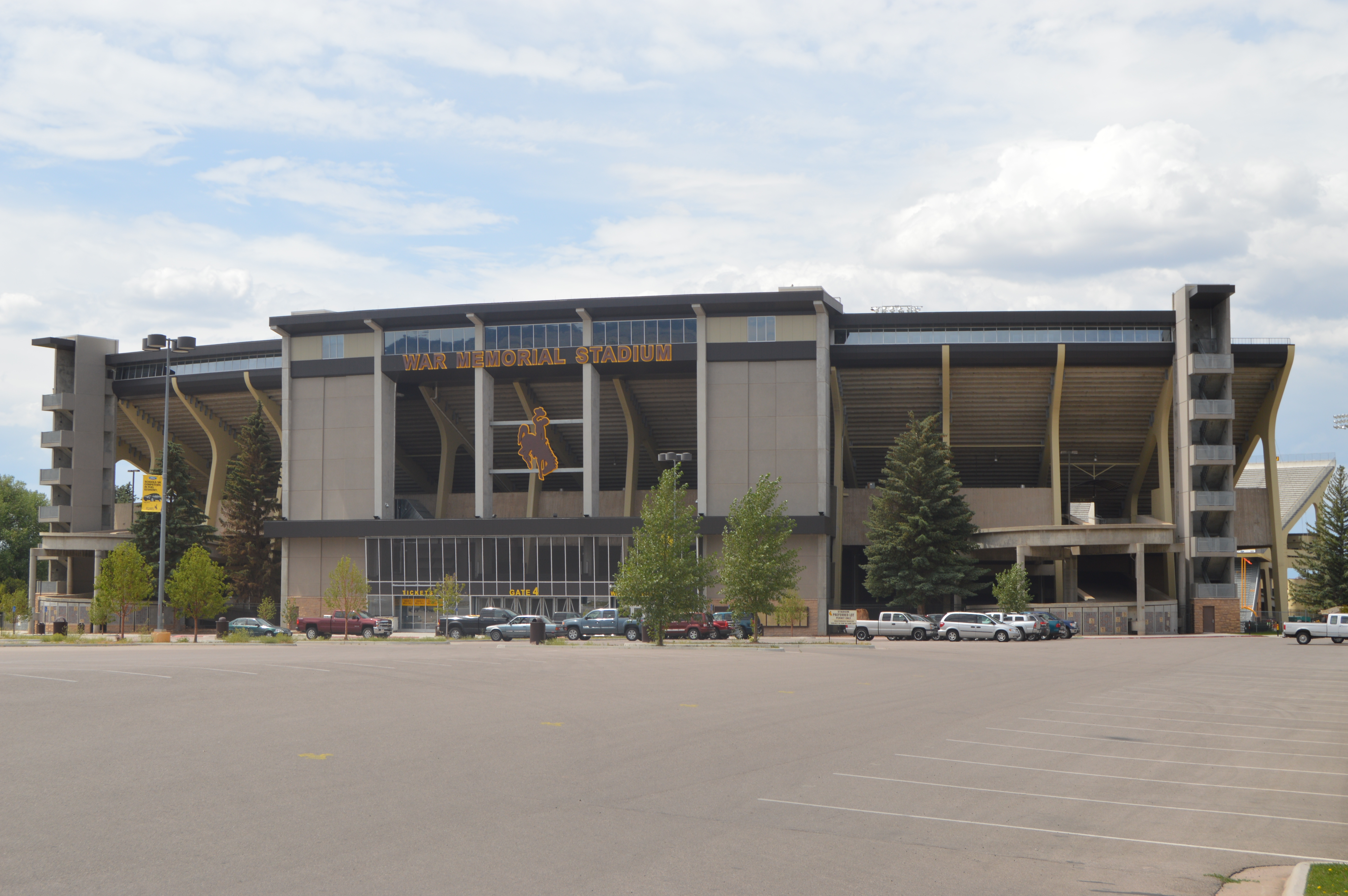
War Memorial Stadium, the Cowboys' home since 1950.

This is a list of seasons completed by the Wyoming Cowboys football team. Representing the University of Wyoming, the Cowboys compete in the Mountain Division of the Mountain West Conference in the NCAA Division I FBS. Wyoming plays their home games out of 29,181-seat War Memorial Stadium in Laramie, Wyoming. The Cowboys began playing football as an independent in 1893 and joined the Rocky Mountain Athletic Conference in 1916. The team played in the Western Athletic Conference from 1962 to 1998, and joined the Mountain West in 1999. They are currently led by head coach Jay Sawvel, who was named head coach on December 6, 2023, following the retirement of Craig Bohl.

Wyoming has three main rivalries, each with Mountain West opponents. The most notable of these is the Border War played against the Colorado State Rams. The winner receives the prized "Bronze Boot". Wyoming has won the last two meetings in the rivalry. The Cowboys also have rivalries with Hawaii and Utah State, the latter known as "Bridger's Battle".

== Seasons ==
Legend

†National champions
^{†} Conference champions
^{‡} Division champions
^Bowl game berth

List of Wyoming Cowboys football seasons
Season	Team	Head coach	Conference	Division	Regular season results							Postseason results	Final ranking	
Season	Team	Head coach	Conference	Division	Overall			Conference				Bowl game/playoff result	AP poll	Coaches Poll
Season	Team	Head coach	Conference	Division	Win	Loss	Tie	Win	Loss	Tie	Finish	Bowl game/playoff result	AP poll	Coaches Poll
Wyoming Cowboys
1893	1893	Fred Hess	Independent	—	1	0	0	—	—	—	—	—	—	—
1894	1894	Fred Hess; Justus F. Soule	Independent	—	3	0	0	—	—	—	—	—	—	—
1895	1895	Justus F. Soule	Independent	—	1	0	0	—	—	—	—	—	—	—
1896	1896	Justus F. Soule	Independent	—	2	0	0	—	—	—	—	—	—	—
1896	1896	Justus F. Soule	Independent	—	2	0	0	—	—	—	—	—	—	—
1898	1898	Fred Hess	Independent	—	0	4	0	—	—	—	—	—	—	—
1899	1899	Justus F. Soule	Independent	—	1	1	—	—	—	—	—	—	—	
1900	1900	William McMurray	Independent	—	3	3	0	—	—	—	—	—	—	—
1901	1901	William McMurray	Independent	—	1	0	0	—	—	—	—	—	—	—
1902	1902	William McMurray	Independent	—	1	0	0	—	—	—	—	—	—	—
1903	1903	William McMurray	Independent	—	3	2	0	—	—	—	—	—	—	—
1904	1904	William McMurray	Independent	—	4	1	1	—	—	—	—	—	—	—
1905	1905	William McMurray	Independent	—	3	4	0	—	—	—	—	—	—	—
1906	1906	William McMurray	Independent	—	1	1	0	—	—	—	—	—	—	—
1907	1907	Robert Ehlman	Independent	—	2	1	0	—	—	—	—	—	—	—
1908	1908	Robert Ehlman	Independent	—	1	2	0	—	—	—	—	—	—	—
1909	1909	Harold I. Dean	Independent	—	3	5	0	—	—	—	—	—	—	—
1910	1910	Harold I. Dean	Independent	—	4	4	0	—	—	—	—	—	—	—
1911	1911	Harold I. Dean	Rocky Mountain	—	4	3	1	—	—	—	—	—	—	—
1912	1912	Leon Exelby	Rocky Mountain	—	2	7	0	—	—	—	—	—	—	—
1913	1913	Ralph Thacker	Rocky Mountain	—	0	5	0	—	—	—	—	—	—	—
1914	1914	Ralph Thacker	Rocky Mountain	—	1	5	0	—	—	—	—	—	—	—
1915	1915	John Corbett	Rocky Mountain	—	2	6	0	—	—	—	—	—	—	—
1916	1916	John Corbett	Rocky Mountain	—	1	4	0	1	4	0	6th	—	—	—
1917	1917	John Corbett	Rocky Mountain	—	3	4	0	1	4	0	7th	—	—	—
1918	1918	John Corbett	Rocky Mountain	—	No games were played due to the Spanish influenza epidemic.									
1919	1919	John Corbett	Rocky Mountain	—	3	5	0	2	2	0	5th	—	—	—
1920	1920	John Corbett	Rocky Mountain	—	4	5	1	1	4	1	7th	—	—	—
1921	1921	John Corbett	Rocky Mountain	—	1	4	2	1	3	2	T–6th	—	—	—
1922	1922	John Corbett	Rocky Mountain	—	1	8	0	0	7	0	11th	—	—	—
1923	1923	John Corbett	Rocky Mountain	—	0	8	0	0	7	0	11th	—	—	—
1924	1924	William Dietz	Rocky Mountain	—	2	6	0	2	6	0	10th	—	—	—
1925	1925	William Dietz	Rocky Mountain	—	6	3	0	4	3	0	5th	—	—	—
1926	1926	William Dietz	Rocky Mountain	—	2	4	2	1	2	2	8th	—	—	—
1927	1927	William Dietz	Rocky Mountain	—	4	5	0	1	4	0	10th	—	—	—
1928	1928	George McLaren	Rocky Mountain	—	2	7	0	0	5	0	11th	—	—	—
1929	1929	George McLaren	Rocky Mountain	—	1	7	0	0	7	0	12th	—	—	—
1930	1930	John Rhodes	Rocky Mountain	—	2	5	1	1	5	1	11th	—	—	—
1931	1931	John Rhodes	Rocky Mountain	—	6	4	0	3	2	0	5th	—	—	—
1932	1932	John Rhodes	Rocky Mountain	—	2	6	1	1	4	1	8th	—	—	—
1933	1933	Willard Witte	Rocky Mountain	—	2	6	1	1	6	1	11th	—	—	—
1934	1934	Willard Witte	Rocky Mountain	—	3	5	0	2	4	0	8th	—	—	—
1935	1935	Willard Witte	Rocky Mountain	—	4	4	0	3	4	0	8th	—	—	—
1936	1936	Willard Witte	Rocky Mountain	—	2	5	1	1	4	1	9th	—	—	—
1937	1937	Willard Witte	Rocky Mountain	—	3	5	0	2	4	0	T–th	—	—	—
1938	1938	Willard Witte	Mountain States	—	2	5	1	1	4	1	6th	—	—	—
1939	1939	Joel Hunt	Mountain States	—	0	7	1	0	5	1	7th	—	—	—
1940	1940	Okie Blanchard	Mountain States	—	1	7	1	0	5	1	7th	—	—	—
1941	1941	Bunny Oakes	Mountain States	—	2	7	1	1	5	0	6th	—	—	—
1942	1942	Bunny Oakes	Mountain States	—	3	5	0	1	5	0	7th	—	—	—
1943	1943	Bunny Oakes	Mountain States	—	Season cancelled due to World War II.									
1944	1944	Bunny Oakes	Mountain States	—	Season cancelled due to World War II.									
1945	1945	Bunny Oakes	Mountain States	—	Season cancelled due to World War II.									
1946	1946	Bunny Oakes	Mountain States	—	1	8	1	0	6	0	7th	—	—	—
1947	1947	Bowden Wyatt	Mountain States	—	4	5	0	2	4	0	6th	—	—	—
1948	1948	Bowden Wyatt	Mountain States	—	4	5	0	0	5	0	7th	—	—	—
1949	1949^{†}	Bowden Wyatt	Mountain States	—	9	1	0	5	0	0	1st^{†}	—	—	—
1950	1950^{†}	Bowden Wyatt	Mountain States	—	10	0	0	5	0	0	1st^{†}	Won 1951 Gator Bowl against Washington and Lee Generals, 20–7 ^	12	—
1951	1951	Bowden Wyatt	Mountain States	—	7	2	1	5	1	1	2nd	—	—	—
1952	1952	Bowden Wyatt	Mountain States	—	5	4	0	4	3	0	4th	—	—	—
1953	1953	Phil Dickens	Mountain States	—	5	4	1	4	2	1	3rd	—	—	—
1954	1954	Phil Dickens	Mountain States	—	6	4	0	5	1	0	2nd	—	—	—
1955	1955	Phil Dickens	Mountain States	—	8	3	0	5	2	0	3rd	Won 1956 Sun Bowl against Texas Tech Red Raiders, 21–14 ^	—	—
1956	1956^{†}	Phil Dickens	Mountain States	—	10	0	0	7	0	0	1st^{†}	—	—	—
1957	1957	Bob Devaney	Mountain States	—	4	3	3	3	2	2	4th	—	—	—
1958	1958^{†}	Bob Devaney	Mountain States	—	7	3	0	6	1	0	1st^{†}	Won 1958 Sun Bowl against Hardin–Simmons Cowboys, 14–6 ^	—	—
1959	1959^{†}	Bob Devaney	Mountain States	—	9	1	0	7	0	0	1st^{†}	—	16	—
1960	1960^{†}	Bob Devaney	Mountain States	—	8	2	0	6	1	0	1st^{†}	—	—	—
1961	1961^{†}	Bob Devaney	Mountain States	—	6	1	2	5	0	1	1st^{†}	—	—	—
1962	1962	Lloyd Eaton	WAC	—	5	5	0	2	2	0	2nd	—	—	—
1963	1963	Lloyd Eaton	WAC	—	6	4	0	2	3	0	4th	—	—	—
1964	1964	Lloyd Eaton	WAC	—	6	2	2	2	2	0	4th	—	—	—
1965	1965	Lloyd Eaton	WAC	—	6	4	0	3	2	0	3rd	—	—	—
1966	1966^{†}	Lloyd Eaton	WAC	—	10	1	0	5	1	0	1st^{†}	Won 1966 Sun Bowl against Florida State Seminoles, 28–20 ^	—	15
1967	1967^{†}	Lloyd Eaton	WAC	—	10	1	0	5	0	0	1st^{†}	Lost 1968 Sugar Bowl against LSU Tigers, 20–13 ^	6	5
1968	1968^{†}	Lloyd Eaton	WAC	—	7	3	0	6	1	0	1st^{†}	—	—	—
1969	1969	Lloyd Eaton	WAC	—	6	4	0	4	3	0	4th	—	—	—
1970	1970	Lloyd Eaton	WAC	—	1	9	0	1	6	0	8th	—	—	—
1971	1971	Fritz Shurmur	WAC	—	5	6	0	3	4	0	6th	—	—	—
1972	1972	Fritz Shurmur	WAC	—	4	7	0	3	4	0	5th	—	—	—
1973	1973	Fritz Shurmur	WAC	—	4	7	0	3	4	0	6th	—	—	—
1974	1974	Fritz Shurmur	WAC	—	2	9	0	1	6	0	8th	—	—	—
1975	1975	Fred Akers	WAC	—	2	9	0	1	6	0	7th	—	—	—
1976	1976 ^{†}	Fred Akers	WAC	—	8	4	0	6	1	0	T–1st^{†}	Lost 1976 Fiesta Bowl against Oklahoma Sooners, 41–7 ^	—	—
1977	1977	Bill Lewis	WAC	—	4	6	1	4	3	0	4th	—	—	—
1978	1978	Bill Lewis	WAC	—	5	7	0	4	2	0	3rd	—	—	—
1979	1979	Bill Lewis	WAC	—	4	8	0	2	5	0	7th	—	—	—
1980	1980	Pat Dye	WAC	—	6	5	0	4	4	0	4th	—	—	—
1981	1981	Al Kincaid	WAC	—	8	3	0	6	2	0	4th	—	—	—
1982	1982	Al Kincaid	WAC	—	5	7	0	2	6	0	8th	—	—	—
1983	1983	Al Kincaid	WAC	—	7	5	0	5	3	0	3rd	—	—	—
1984	1984	Al Kincaid	WAC	—	6	6	0	4	4	0	6th	—	—	—
1985	1985	Al Kincaid	WAC	—	3	8	0	2	6	0	8th	—	—	—
1986	1986	Dennis Erickson	WAC	—	6	6	0	4	4	0	6th	—	—	—
1987	1987^{†}	Paul Roach	WAC	—	10	3	0	8	0	0	1st^{†}	Lost 1987 Holiday Bowl against Iowa Hawkeyes, 20–19 ^	—	—
1988	1988^{†}	Paul Roach	WAC	—	11	2	0	8	0	0	1st^{†}	Lost 1988 Holiday Bowl against Oklahoma State Cowboys, 62–14 ^	—	20
1989	1989	Paul Roach	WAC	—	5	6	0	5	3	0	4th	—	—	—
1990	1990	Paul Roach	WAC	—	9	4	0	5	3	0	4th	Lost 1990 Copper Bowl against Cal Golden Bears, 17–15 ^	—	—
1991	1991	Joe Tiller	WAC	—	4	6	1	2	5	1	6th	—	—	—
1992	1992	Joe Tiller	WAC	—	5	7	0	3	5	0	7th	—	—	—
1993	1993 ^{†}	Joe Tiller	WAC	—	8	4	0	6	2	0	T–1st^{†}	Lost 1993 Copper Bowl against Kansas State Wildcats, 52–17 ^	—	—
1994	1994	Joe Tiller	WAC	—	6	6	0	4	4	0	5th	—	—	—
1995	1995	Joe Tiller	WAC	—	6	5	0	4	4	0	6th	—	—	—
1996 (Note: Overtime rules were added to college football in 1996, thereby eliminating ties.)	1996^{‡}	Joe Tiller	WAC	Pacific	10	2		7	1		1st^{‡}	—	22	22
1997	1997	Dana Dimel	WAC	Pacific	7	6		4	4		4th	—	—	—
1998	1998	Dana Dimel	WAC	Mountain	8	3		6	2		2nd	—	—	—
1999	1999	Dana Dimel	Mountain West	—	7	4		4	3		4th	—	—	—
2000	2000	Vic Koenning	Mountain West	—	1	10		0	7		8th	—	—	—
2001	2001	Vic Koenning	Mountain West	—	2	9		0	7		8th	—	—	—
2002	2002	Vic Koenning	Mountain West	—	2	10		1	6		8th	—	—	—
2003	2003	Joe Glenn	Mountain West	—	4	8		2	5		8th	—	—	—
2004	2004	Joe Glenn	Mountain West	—	7	5		3	4		4th	Won 2004 Las Vegas Bowl against UCLA Bruins, 24–21 ^	—	—
2005	2005	Joe Glenn	Mountain West	—	4	7		2	6		8th	—	—	—
2006	2006	Joe Glenn	Mountain West	—	6	6		5	3		4th	—	—	—
2007	2007	Joe Glenn	Mountain West	—	5	7		2	6		7th	—	—	—
2008	2008	Joe Glenn	Mountain West	—	4	8		1	7		8th	—	—	—
2009	2009	Dave Christensen	Mountain West	—	7	6		4	4		5th	Won 2009 New Mexico Bowl against Fresno State Bulldogs, 35–28 (2OT) ^	—	—
2010	2010	Dave Christensen	Mountain West	—	3	9		1	7		8th	—	—	—
2011	2011	Dave Christensen	Mountain West	—	8	5		5	2		3rd	Lost 2011 New Mexico Bowl against Temple Owls, 37–15	—	—
2012	2012	Dave Christensen	Mountain West	—	4	8		3	5		6th	—	—	—
2013	2013	Dave Christensen	Mountain West	Mountain	5	7		3	5		4th	—	—	—
2014	2014	Craig Bohl	Mountain West	Mountain	4	8		2	6		5th	—	—	—
2015	2015	Craig Bohl	Mountain West	Mountain	2	10		2	6		6th	—	—	—
2016	2016^{‡}	Craig Bohl	Mountain West	Mountain	8	6		6	2		T–1st^{‡}	Lost 2016 Poinsettia Bowl against BYU Cougars, 24–21	—	—
2017	2017	Craig Bohl	Mountain West	Mountain	8	5		5	3		2nd	Won 2017 Famous Idaho Potato Bowl against Central Michigan Chippewas, 37–14	—	—
2018	2018	Craig Bohl	Mountain West	Mountain	6	6		4	4		3rd	—	—	—
2019	2019	Craig Bohl	Mountain West	Mountain	8	5		4	4		4th	Won 2019 Arizona Bowl against Georgia State Panthers, 38–17	—	—
2020	2020	Craig Bohl	Mountain West	— (Note: Conference divisions were eliminated for the shortened 2020 season because of the COVID-19 pandemic.)	2	4		2	4		8th	—	—	—
2021	2021	Craig Bohl	Mountain West	Mountain	7	6		2	6		4th	Won 2021 Famous Idaho Potato Bowl against Kent State Golden Flashes, 52–38	—	—
2022	2022	Craig Bohl	Mountain West	Mountain	7	5		5	3		4th	Lost 2022 Arizona Bowl against Ohio Bobcats, 30–27	—	—
2023	2023	Craig Bohl	Mountain West	—	8	4		5	3		4th	Won 2023 Arizona Bowl against Toledo Rockets, 16-15	—	—
2024	2024	Jay Sawvel	Mountain West	—	3	9		2	5		T–10th	—	—	—
2025	2025	Jay Sawvel	Mountain West	—	4	8		2	6		T–9th	—	—	—
Totals					All-time: 572–616–28 (.483)			Conference: 323–391–18 (.454)			—	Postseason: 9–9 (.500)	—	—
