= 1940 New Mexico A&M Aggies football team =

American college football season

1940 New Mexico A&M Aggies football
- Conference: Border Conference
- Record: 3–6 (1–4 Border)
- Head coach: Julius H. Johnston (1st season)
- Home stadium: Quesenberry Field

1940 Border Conference football standings
	Conf.					Overall
Team	W		L		T	W		L		T
Arizona State $	3	–	0	–	1	7	–	2	–	2
Arizona	3	–	1	–	0	7	–	2	–	0
Texas Mines	3	–	1	–	1	4	–	4	–	1
New Mexico	3	–	2	–	0	5	–	4	–	0
New Mexico A&M	1	–	4	–	0	3	–	6	–	0
Texas Tech	0	–	1	–	0	9	–	1	–	1
Arizona State–Flagstaff	0	–	5	–	0	2	–	6	–	0
$ – Conference champion

The 1940 New Mexico A&M Aggies football team was an American football team that represented New Mexico College of Agriculture and Mechanical Arts (now known as New Mexico State University) as a member of the Border Conference during the 1940 college football season. In its first year under head coach Julius H. Johnston, the team compiled a 3–6 record (1–4 against conference opponents), finished sixth in the conference, and was outscored by a total of 200 to 95. The team played home games at Quesenberry Field in Las Cruces, New Mexico.

New Mexico A&M was ranked No. 321 (out of 697 college football teams) in the final rankings under the Litkenhous Difference by Score system for 1940.

== Schedule ==
Date	Opponent	Site	Result	Attendance	Source
September 21	Silver City Teachers*	Quesenberry Field; Las Cruces, NM	W 12–0		
September 27	Howard Payne*	Quesenberry Field; Las Cruces, NM	L 0–10		
October 5	at Arizona	Arizona Stadium; Tucson, AZ	L 0–41	8,000	
October 19	at Arizona State	Goodwin Stadium; Tempe, AZ	L 6–42		
October 25	Arizona State–Flagstaff	Quesenberry Field; Las Cruces, NM	W 13–0		
November 1	Bradley*	Quesenberry Field; Las Cruces, NM	L 7–14		
November 9	at New Mexico	Hilltop Stadium; Albuquerque, NM (rivalry)	L 6–39	6,500	
November 23	Redlands*^{†}	Quesenberry Field; Las Cruces, NM	W 25–14		
November 30	at Texas Mines	Kidd Field; El Paso, TX (rivalry)	L 26–40		
*Non-conference game; ^{†}Homecoming
