= Battle of I-10 =

Conference USA rivalry game

- New Mexico State Aggies UTEP Miners
- Sport: Football
- First meeting: October 31, 1914; New Mexico A&M 19, Texas State M&M 0
- Latest meeting: November 22, 2025; New Mexico State 34, UTEP 31
- Stadiums: Aggie Memorial Stadium; Las Cruces, New Mexico, U.S. Sun Bowl; El Paso, Texas, U.S.
- Trophy: Silver Spade Trophy; Mayor's Cup

Statistics
- Total meetings: 102
- All-time series: UTEP leads 60–40–2 (.598)
- Largest victory: Texas State M&M, 92–7 (1948)
- Longest win streak: UTEP, 8 (2009–2016)
- Current win streak: New Mexico State, 1 (2025–present)

Locations of New Mexico State and UTEP

The Battle of I-10 is the name given to the New Mexico State–UTEP football rivalry. It is a college rivalry game between New Mexico State University (NMSU) and the University of Texas at El Paso (UTEP). It is called the Battle of I-10 because the two universities are located along Interstate 10 connecting Las Cruces and El Paso. The teams compete for the Silver Spade Trophy and the Mayor's Cup.

== Football ==
In the 109–year-old series between the New Mexico State Aggies and the UTEP Miners, UTEP holds the series lead at 60–40–2, largely due to dominance in the series from the 1920s to the 1960s.

The winner of the annual matchup receives a pair of traveling trophies. The older of the two is known as the Silver Spade and dates to 1955. The trophy is a replica of a prospector's shovel from an abandoned mine in the Organ Mountains. The Mayor's Cup was added in 1982 and is nicknamed the Brass Spittoon.

Due to the close proximity of the campuses it was natural for a rivalry to develop. The Texas College of Mines played its first ever game against a collegiate opponent versus New Mexico A&M in 1914 and, with few exceptions, including during World War I and World War II, the teams would meet again every year. Following World War II, the series resumed on an annual basis from 1946 until 2001, when UTEP's administration made the controversial decision to cancel their scheduled trip to Las Cruces in favor of scheduling an additional home contest against a Division I-AA opponent. The schools agreed to meet again in 2002 (a 49–14 New Mexico State win, their biggest blowout of the Miners since 1922), but did not play again until 2004 in El Paso when the Miners exacted revenge for their blowout loss two years prior with a 45–0 pasting of the Aggies, the most lopsided result in the series in 55 years. The blowout marked the beginning of a three-game winning streak for UTEP in the rivalry. The tide of the series then seemingly turned back in the Aggies' favor, as New Mexico State defeated UTEP the next two years, their first back-to-back wins over UTEP since 1994 and 1995. The Aggies edged the Miners 34–33 on September 20, 2008, at the Sun Bowl for their first win in El Paso since 1994. However, the most recent three games in the series have gone back to the Miners, with UTEP defeating NMSU at Aggie Memorial Stadium 38–12 on September 19, 2009 (only their second win in the Mesilla Valley since 1991), topping the Aggies 42–10 at the Sun Bowl on September 18, 2010, and again defeating the Aggies 16–10 on September 17, 2011, in Las Cruces for their first back-to-back road wins in the series since winning four straight games in Las Cruces between 1986 and 1991.

In August 2020, New Mexico State postponed football and fall sports due to COVID-19. However, UTEP and Conference USA proceeded with fall football. As a result, in 2020, the Battle of I-10 had no football game for the first time since 2003.

On November 5, 2021, New Mexico State announced it would be joining UTEP in Conference USA in all sports including football starting in 2023. The 2023 game thus marked the first time in over 60 years that the Battle of I-10 was played as a conference game; before this, the last time this happened was in 1961, with both schools as members of the now defunct Border Conference.

On October 1, 2024, UTEP announced it would be joining the Mountain West Conference in all sports starting in 2026. Following the final CUSA conference football game between the two schools in 2025, the future of the rivalry game frequency remains unknown, although they will likely play again due to both programs remaining in the Football Bowl Subdivision.

=== Notable statistics ===
- From 1920 to 1951, UTEP hosted 22 of 28 games.
- Before 1927, New Mexico State dominated the first 10 games with a record of 8–1–1.
- From 1927 to 1967, UTEP dominated the series with a record of 29–7–1.
- New Mexico State's back-to-back victories in 1960–1961 were its first since 1937–1938.
- As of 2025, UTEP has won on the road 21 times, while New Mexico State has won on the road 19 times.
- There have been 2 ties in the series, once in El Paso in 1925 and once in Las Cruces in 1952.
- The September 26, 1998, game at Aggie Memorial Stadium set the all-time attendance record for any football game at the stadium with 32,993 in attendance.
- The September 25, 1999, game at Sun Bowl set a new attendance record for that stadium with 52,247 which surpasses all Sun Bowl games and NFL Exhibition games ever played there. However, since then 2 regular season UTEP games have surpassed that attendance.
- The two most record breaking lopsided victories in the rivalry:
  - November 11, 1922 – New Mexico State 64, UTEP 0
  - November 25, 1948 – UTEP 92, New Mexico State 7

=== Game results ===
Note: UTEP was known as the Texas School of Mines and Metallurgy prior to 1949 and Texas Western College from 1949–1967 and New Mexico State was known as New Mexico College of Agriculture and Mechanic Arts prior to 1960. Both schools are listed under their modern abbreviations for all games.

New Mexico State victories	UTEP victories	Tie games

No.	Date	Location	Winning team		Losing team	
1	October 31, 1914	Las Cruces, NM	New Mexico A&M	19	Texas State M&M	0
2	October 30, 1915	Las Cruces, NM	New Mexico A&M	34	Texas State M&M	0
3	November 25, 1916	Las Cruces, NM	Texas State M&M	6	New Mexico A&M	3
4	November 11, 1920	El Paso, TX	New Mexico A&M	12	Texas State M&M	7
5	November 11, 1921	El Paso, TX	New Mexico A&M	13	Texas State M&M	0
6	November 11, 1922	Las Cruces, NM	New Mexico A&M	64	Texas State M&M	0
7	November 11, 1923	El Paso, TX	New Mexico A&M	23	Texas State M&M	2
8	November 8, 1924	El Paso, TX	New Mexico A&M	19	Texas State M&M	0
9	November 7, 1925	El Paso, TX	Tie	6	Tie	6
10	November 6, 1926	El Paso, TX	New Mexico A&M	10	Texas State M&M	8
11	November 12, 1927	El Paso, TX	Texas State M&M	19	New Mexico A&M	7
12	November 10, 1928	El Paso, TX	Texas State M&M	6	New Mexico A&M	0
13	November 9, 1929	El Paso, TX	Texas State M&M	8	New Mexico A&M	0
14	November 15, 1930	Las Cruces, NM	Texas State M&M	25	New Mexico A&M	0
15	November 21, 1931	El Paso, TX	Texas State M&M	20	New Mexico A&M	0
16	October 29, 1932	Las Cruces, NM	Texas State M&M	31	New Mexico A&M	6
17	November 4, 1933	El Paso, TX	Texas State M&M	9	New Mexico A&M	0
18	November 28, 1935	Las Cruces, NM	New Mexico A&M	7	Texas State M&M	0
19	November 26, 1936	El Paso, TX	Texas State M&M	27	New Mexico A&M	7
20	September 24, 1937	Las Cruces, NM	New Mexico A&M	14	Texas State M&M	0
21	November 24, 1938	El Paso, TX	New Mexico A&M	13	Texas State M&M	9
22	November 30, 1939	Las Cruces, NM	Texas State M&M	34	New Mexico A&M	0
23	November 30, 1940	El Paso, TX	Texas State M&M	40	New Mexico A&M	26
24	November 22, 1941	El Paso, TX	Texas State M&M	24	New Mexico A&M	13
25	November 26, 1942	El Paso, TX	Texas State M&M	61	New Mexico A&M	6
26	November 28, 1946	El Paso, TX	New Mexico A&M	14	Texas State M&M	7
27	November 22, 1947	El Paso, TX	Texas State M&M	26	New Mexico A&M	0
28	November 25, 1948	El Paso, TX	Texas State M&M	92	New Mexico A&M	7
29	November 25, 1949	El Paso, TX	Texas Western	69	New Mexico A&M	7
30	September 23, 1950	El Paso, TX	Texas Western	40	New Mexico A&M	0
31	September 29, 1951	El Paso, TX	Texas Western	41	New Mexico A&M	7
32	October 18, 1952	Las Cruces, NM	Tie	20	Tie	20
33	October 17, 1953	El Paso, TX	Texas Western	39	New Mexico A&M	0
34	October 30, 1954	Las Cruces, NM	Texas Western	12	New Mexico A&M	7
35	October 29, 1955	El Paso, TX	Texas Western	41	New Mexico A&M	6
36	October 27, 1956	Las Cruces, NM	Texas Western	51	New Mexico A&M	7
37	October 26, 1957	El Paso, TX	Texas Western	42	New Mexico A&M	12
38	October 25, 1958	Las Cruces, NM	New Mexico A&M	17	Texas Western	16
39	October 24, 1959	El Paso, TX	Texas Western	20	New Mexico A&M	15
40	November 26, 1960	Las Cruces, NM	#15 New Mexico State	27	Texas Western	15
41	October 28, 1961	El Paso, TX	New Mexico State	42	Texas Western	6
42	November 10, 1962	Las Cruces, NM	Texas Western	21	New Mexico State	0
43	October 5, 1963	El Paso, TX	Texas Western	14	New Mexico State	13
44	November 21, 1964	Las Cruces, NM	New Mexico State	13	Texas Western	7
45	October 2, 1965	El Paso, TX	Texas Western	21	New Mexico State	6
46	November 19, 1966	El Paso, TX	Texas Western	28	New Mexico State	14
47	November 4, 1967	El Paso, TX	UTEP	46	New Mexico State	24
48	October 19, 1968	El Paso, TX	UTEP	30	New Mexico State	14
49	November 8, 1969	El Paso, TX	New Mexico State	41	UTEP	38
50	October 3, 1970	El Paso, TX	UTEP	21	New Mexico State	14
51	October 16, 1971	Las Cruces, NM	UTEP	14	New Mexico State	7
52	September 30, 1972	El Paso, TX	UTEP	21	New Mexico State	20

No.	Date	Location	Winning team		Losing team	
53	October 6, 1973	El Paso, TX	New Mexico State	27	UTEP	23
54	October 12, 1974	Las Cruces, NM	New Mexico State	14	UTEP	13
55	September 13, 1975	El Paso, TX	New Mexico State	31	UTEP	24
56	September 11, 1976	Las Cruces, NM	New Mexico State	13	UTEP	10
57	October 1, 1977	El Paso, TX	UTEP	23	New Mexico State	21
58	September 16, 1978	Las Cruces, NM	New Mexico State	35	UTEP	32
59	September 15, 1979	El Paso, TX	New Mexico State	14	UTEP	13
60	September 13, 1980	Las Cruces, NM	New Mexico State	6	UTEP	3
61	September 5, 1981	El Paso, TX	New Mexico State	14	UTEP	7
62	September 4, 1982	Las Cruces, NM	UTEP	20	New Mexico State	17
63	September 3, 1983	El Paso, TX	UTEP	20	New Mexico State	9
64	October 6, 1984	Las Cruces, NM	New Mexico State	27	UTEP	16
65	September 21, 1985	El Paso, TX	New Mexico State	22	UTEP	20
66	September 13, 1986	Las Cruces, NM	UTEP	47	New Mexico State	33
67	September 5, 1987	El Paso, TX	UTEP	31	New Mexico State	0
68	October 29, 1988	Las Cruces, NM	UTEP	42	New Mexico State	9
69	September 16, 1989	Las Cruces, NM	UTEP	29	New Mexico State	27
70	September 8, 1990	El Paso, TX	UTEP	27	New Mexico State	24
71	September 14, 1991	Las Cruces, NM	UTEP	22	New Mexico State	21
72	September 19, 1992	El Paso, TX	New Mexico State	30	UTEP	24
73	September 18, 1993	Las Cruces, NM	New Mexico State	31	UTEP	14
74	September 17, 1994	El Paso, TX	New Mexico State	23	UTEP	22
75	September 2, 1995	Las Cruces, NM	New Mexico State	45	UTEP	17
76	September 14, 1996	El Paso, TX	UTEP	14	New Mexico State	7
77	September 27, 1997	El Paso, TX	UTEP	24	New Mexico State	16
78	September 26, 1998	Las Cruces, NM	New Mexico State	33	UTEP	24
79	September 25, 1999	El Paso, TX	UTEP	54	New Mexico State	23
80	September 30, 2000	El Paso, TX	UTEP	41	New Mexico State	31
81	October 5, 2002	Las Cruces, NM	New Mexico State	49	UTEP	14
82	October 2, 2004	El Paso, TX	UTEP	45	New Mexico State	0
83	September 3, 2005	Las Cruces, NM	UTEP	34	New Mexico State	17
84	September 30, 2006	El Paso, TX	UTEP	44	New Mexico State	38
85	September 15, 2007	Las Cruces, NM	New Mexico State	29	UTEP	24
86	September 20, 2008	El Paso, TX	New Mexico State	34	UTEP	33
87	September 19, 2009	Las Cruces, NM	UTEP	38	New Mexico State	12
88	September 18, 2010	El Paso, TX	UTEP	42	New Mexico State	10
89	September 17, 2011	Las Cruces, NM	UTEP	16	New Mexico State	10
90	September 15, 2012	El Paso, TX	UTEP	41	New Mexico State	28
91	September 14, 2013	Las Cruces, NM	UTEP	42	New Mexico State	21
92	September 13, 2014	El Paso, TX	UTEP	42	New Mexico State	24
93	September 19, 2015	Las Cruces, NM	UTEP	50	New Mexico State	47
94	September 3, 2016	El Paso, TX	UTEP	38	New Mexico State	22
95	September 23, 2017	Las Cruces, NM	New Mexico State	41	UTEP	14
96	September 22, 2018	El Paso, TX	New Mexico State	27	UTEP	20
97	November 23, 2019	Las Cruces, NM	New Mexico State	44	UTEP	35
98	August 28, 2021	Las Cruces, NM	UTEP	30	New Mexico State	3
99	September 10, 2022	El Paso, TX	UTEP	20	New Mexico State	13
100	October 18, 2023	El Paso, TX	New Mexico State	28	UTEP	7
101	November 30, 2024	Las Cruces, NM	UTEP	42	New Mexico State	35
102	November 22, 2025	El Paso, TX	New Mexico State	34	UTEP	31
Series: UTEP leads 60–40–2

- Non-conference games (76: 1914–1933 and 1962–2022)
- Not played in 11 seasons (1917–1919, 1934, 1943–1945, 2001, 2003, 2020 and 2026)

== Coaching records ==
Since first game on October 31, 1914

=== New Mexico State ===
Head Coach	Team	Games	Seasons	Wins	Losses	Ties	Pct.
Clarence W. Russell	New Mexico A&M	3	1914–1916	2	1	0	.667
John G. Griffith	New Mexico A&M	0	1917	0	0	0	–
No team (1918)
Anthony Savage	New Mexico A&M	0	1919	0	0	0	–
Dutch Bergman	New Mexico A&M	3	1920–1922	3	0	0	1.000
R. R. Brown	New Mexico A&M	3	1923–1925	2	0	1	.833
Arthur Burkholder	New Mexico A&M	1	1926	1	0	0	1.000
Ted Coffman	New Mexico A&M	2	1927–1928	0	2	0	.000
Jerry Hines	New Mexico A&M	10	1929–1939	3	7	0	.300
Julius H. Johnston	New Mexico A&M	3	1940–1942	0	3	0	.000
Maurice Moulder	New Mexico A&M	0	1943	0	0	0	–
No team (1944–1945)
Raymond A. Curfman	New Mexico A&M	2	1946–1947	1	1	0	.500
Vaughn Corley	New Mexico A&M	3	1948–1950	0	3	0	.000
Joseph T. Coleman	New Mexico A&M	2	1951–1952	0	1	1	.250
James Patton	New Mexico A&M	2	1953–1954	0	2	0	.000
Tony Cavallo	New Mexico A&M	3	1955–1957	0	3	0	.000
Warren B. Woodson	New Mexico A&M / State	10	1958–1967	4	6	0	.400
Jim Wood	New Mexico State	5	1968–1972	1	4	0	.200
Jim Bradley	New Mexico State	5	1973–1977	4	1	0	.800
Gil Krueger	New Mexico State	5	1978–1982	4	1	0	.800
Fred Zechman	New Mexico State	3	1983–1985	2	1	0	.667
Mike Knoll	New Mexico State	4	1986–1989	0	4	0	.000
Jim Hess	New Mexico State	7	1990–1996	4	3	0	.571
Tony Samuel	New Mexico State	6	1997–2004	2	4		.333
Hal Mumme	New Mexico State	4	2005–2008	2	2		.500
DeWayne Walker	New Mexico State	4	2009–2012	0	4		.000
Doug Martin	New Mexico State	8	2013–2021	3	5		.375
Jerry Kill	New Mexico State	2	2022–2023	1	1		.500
Tony Sanchez	New Mexico State	2	2024–present	1	1		.500

=== UTEP ===
Head Coach	Team	Games	Seasons	Wins	Losses	Ties	Pct.
Tommy Dwyer (a)	Texas State M&M	3	1914–1917	1	2	0	.333
No team (1918)
Tommy Dwyer (b)	Texas State M&M	0	1919	0	0	0	–
Harry Van Surdam	Texas State M&M	1	1920	0	1	0	.000
Thomas C. Holliday	Texas State M&M	1	1921	0	1	0	.000
Jack C. Vowell	Texas State M&M	2	1922–1923	0	2	0	.000
George B. Powell	Texas State M&M	3	1924–1926	0	2	1	.167
E. J. Stewart	Texas State M&M	2	1927–1928	2	0	0	1.000
Mack Saxon	Texas State M&M	12	1929–1941	9	3	0	.750
Walter Milner	Texas State M&M	1	1942	1	0	0	1.000
No team (1943–1945)
Jack Curtice	Texas State M&M / Western	4	1946–1949	3	1	0	.750
Mike Brumbelow	Texas Western	7	1950–1956	6	0	1	.929
Ben Collins	Texas Western	5	1957–1961	2	3	0	.400
Bum Phillips	Texas Western	1	1962	1	0	0	1.000
Warren Harper	Texas Western	2	1963–1964	1	1	0	.500
Bobby Dobbs	Texas Western / UTEP	8	1965–1972	7	1	0	.875
Tommy Hudspeth	UTEP	1	1972–1973	0	1	0	.000
Gil Bartosh	UTEP	3	1974–1976	0	3	0	.000
Bill Michael	UTEP	5	1977–1981	1	4	0	.200
Billy Alton	UTEP	0	1981	0	0	0	–
Bill Yung	UTEP	4	1982–1985	2	2	0	.500
Bob Stull	UTEP	3	1986–1988	3	0	0	1.000
David Lee	UTEP	5	1989–1993	3	2	0	.600
Charlie Bailey	UTEP	6	1993–1999	3	3	0	.500
Gary Nord	UTEP	2	2000–2003	1	1		.500
Mike Price (a)	UTEP	9	2004–2012	7	2		.778
Sean Kugler	UTEP	5	2013–2017	4	1		.800
Mike Price (b)	UTEP	0	2017	0	0		–
Dana Dimel	UTEP	5	2018–2023	2	3		.400
Scotty Walden	UTEP	1	2024–present	1	1		.500

- Tommy Dwyer's overall record in series was 2–0–0 (1.000)
- Mike Price's overall record in series is 7–2 (.778)

== Basketball ==
The New Mexico State and UTEP men's basketball programs share remarkably similar histories and have played an extremely competitive series of games against one another. The programs both experienced their greatest national prominence in the late 1960s and early 1970s, when both schools were led by young up-and-coming coaches who would eventually win more than 700 games (Lou Henson at New Mexico State, Don Haskins at UTEP) and appeared in the NCAA tournament's Final Four within four years of each other. UTEP (then still known as Texas Western) won the 1966 national title while New Mexico State advanced to the 1970 national semifinal before falling to UCLA, but won the consolation game to finish the season third in the nation. Both programs returned to national prominence in the early 1990s with the Aggies and Miners both advancing to the NCAA Tournament's "Sweet Sixteen" in 1992. New Mexico State has appeared in the NCAA Tournament 18 times to UTEP's 17 appearances, and New Mexico State has advanced to the Sweet Sixteen five times to UTEP's four (although three of New Mexico State's appearances in the early 1990s, including the 1992 Sweet Sixteen run, have since been vacated by the NCAA due to rules violations). Most recently, both schools won conference titles and advanced to the NCAA tournament in 2010.

There is some discrepancy between the two schools on the all-time series record as well as the number of all-time meetings between the schools. Entering the 2017–18 season New Mexico State records show that the schools have met 200 times, with New Mexico State holding a 109–103 all time advantage, while UTEP records show 201 meetings with New Mexico State's advantage at 108–104. Uniquely among non-conference rivalries, the schools traditionally play a two-game home-and-home series each season, unlike most other non-conference rivalry series where a single meeting per season is the norm. UTEP swept the 2010–11 series between the schools, winning 73–56 on November 23, 2010, in El Paso and 74–72 on November 30, 2010, in Las Cruces. The Aggies defeated the Miners 89–73 in the first meeting of the 2011–12 season series on November 19, 2011, at the Pan American Center in Las Cruces. And later in the second meeting of 2011–12 basketball season the Miners defeated the Aggies 73–69 on December 11, 2011, at the Don Haskins Center in El Paso to split the season series.

== See also ==
- List of NCAA college football rivalry games
- List of most-played college football series in NCAA Division I
