= Rio Grande Rivalry (football) =

American college football rivalry

- New Mexico Lobos New Mexico State Aggies
- Sport: Football
- First meeting: January 1, 1894; New Mexico 18, New Mexico A&M 6
- Latest meeting: September 26, 2026; New Mexico 42, New Mexico State 18
- Next meeting: September 25, 2027 in Albuquerque
- Stadiums: University Stadium; Albuquerque, New Mexico, U.S. Aggie Memorial Stadium; Las Cruces, New Mexico, U.S.
- Trophy: None (1894–1992 and 2001–2025); Maloof Trophy (1993–2000); The Roaster (2025–present)

Statistics
- Total meetings: 116
- All-time series: New Mexico leads, 76–35–5 (.674)
- Largest victory: New Mexico A&M, 110–3 (1917)
- Longest win streak: New Mexico, 18 (1938–1958)
- Current win streak: New Mexico, 3 (2024–present)

Locations of New Mexico and New Mexico State

The New Mexico–New Mexico State football rivalry, known as the Battle of I-25 and the Rio Grande Rivalry in all sports, is an annual football game between the University of New Mexico and New Mexico State University. It is called the Battle of I-25 because the two universities are located along Interstate 25 connecting Albuquerque and Las Cruces. In the entire history of the rivalry, the game has never been contested anywhere beside those two cities.

== Series history ==
The rivalry between New Mexico's only two NCAA Division I institutions dates back to January 1, 1894 – eighteen years before New Mexico achieved statehood – when the schools met in a football contest in Albuquerque. While it is clear that New Mexico won that first game, school records seem to disagree on the score. According to New Mexico media guides the final score was 25–5 but according to New Mexico State media guides the score was 18–6. By the time New Mexico entered the union in 1912 UNM and New Mexico A&M (as NMSU was known prior to 1959) had already met on the gridiron six times. Until 1937, the series was competitive with the Aggies holding a 15–12–4 lead over the Lobos. Starting in 1938 the Lobos began to dominate the series, starting with a streak of 18 straight wins over the Aggies from 1938 to 1958 (including a three year stretch during World War II when the game was not played). From 1959 to 1968, however, the Aggies won seven of ten meetings, mostly during the tenure of College Football Hall of Fame head coach Warren B. Woodson. Although the Aggies defeated the Lobos in their first meeting after Woodson's departure in 1968, the Lobos resumed their dominance in the series the following year, winning 16 of the next 18 meetings (including a tie in 1971). Beginning in 1993, the two universities played for the Maloof Trophy, but it was short-lived; the trophy was retired in 2000.

The Lobos all-time advantage is 74–35–5, however the rivalry remains spirited, with the series even at seven wins each over the past 14 games dating back to the 100th meeting between the schools in 2009. Most recently the Lobos defeated the Aggies 50–40 on September 28, 2024.

In August 2020, New Mexico State postponed football and fall sports due to COVID-19 with consideration for a spring football season. The Mountain West Conference initially postponed fall sports for New Mexico and other member schools as well, but New Mexico and other member schools began a conference-only schedule beginning in late October. The 2020 season was the first since 1945 without the rivalry game.

During a press conference on the Tuesday before the 2025 edition, UNM head coach Jason Eck good-naturedly bemoaned the lack of a traveling trophy, telling reporters "We need a trophy for this game, too . . . Truly a missed opportunity we don’t have a trophy for this game. It’s a shame. Traveling trophies are one of the best things. So, I’ll be very disappointed if we don’t have one for next year. Let’s get that fixed." Students at the two schools stepped in to create "The Roaster", a tabletop chile roaster trophy with wooden stands on each side, including branding of the two programs. The new trophy was ready in time for the 2025 game.

== Game results ==
| New Mexico victories | New Mexico State victories | Tie games |

| No. | Date | Location | Winning team | | Losing team | |
|---|---|---|---|---|---|---|
| 1 | January 1, 1894 | Albuquerque, NM | New Mexico | 18 | New Mexico A&M | 6 (Note: New Mexico cites the final score as 25–5, while New Mexico State cites the final as 18–6.) |
| 2 | November 30, 1905 | Las Cruces, NM | New Mexico A&M | 40 | New Mexico | 0 |
| 3 | November 29, 1906 | Albuquerque, NM | New Mexico A&M | 25 | New Mexico | 5 |
| 4 | November 21, 1908 | Las Cruces, NM | New Mexico | 10 | New Mexico A&M | 6 |
| 5 | December 3, 1909 | Albuquerque, NM | New Mexico | 51 | New Mexico A&M | 0 |
| 6 | November 12, 1911 | Las Cruces, NM | New Mexico A&M | 10 | New Mexico | 6 |
| 7 | November 16, 1912 | Albuquerque, NM | New Mexico A&M | 27 | New Mexico | 0 |
| 8 | November 14, 1913 | Las Cruces, NM | New Mexico A&M | 13 | New Mexico | 0 |
| 9 | November 26, 1914 | Albuquerque, NM | Tie | 7 | Tie | 7 |
| 10 | November 25, 1915 | Las Cruces, NM | New Mexico | 13 | New Mexico A&M | 0 |
| 11 | November 30, 1916 | Albuquerque, NM | New Mexico | 51 | New Mexico A&M | 0 |
| 12 | November 29, 1917 | Las Cruces, NM | New Mexico A&M | 110 | New Mexico | 3 |
| 13 | November 27, 1919 | Albuquerque, NM | New Mexico | 24 | New Mexico A&M | 2 |
| 14 | December 4, 1920 | Las Cruces, NM | New Mexico A&M | 14 | New Mexico | 7 |
| 15 | November 24, 1921 | Albuquerque, NM | New Mexico | 6 | New Mexico A&M | 0 |
| 16 | November 30, 1922 | Las Cruces, NM | New Mexico A&M | 7 | New Mexico | 0 |
| 17 | November 17, 1923 | Albuquerque, NM | New Mexico A&M | 6 | New Mexico | 0 |
| 18 | November 15, 1924 | Las Cruces, NM | New Mexico A&M | 6 | New Mexico | 0 |
| 19 | November 21, 1925 | Albuquerque, NM | New Mexico | 20 | New Mexico A&M | 9 |
| 20 | November 13, 1926 | Las Cruces, NM | Tie | 6 | Tie | 6 |
| 21 | November 18, 1927 | Las Cruces, NM | New Mexico | 26 | New Mexico A&M | 9 |
| 22 | October 27, 1928 | Albuquerque, NM | New Mexico | 14 | New Mexico A&M | 13 |
| 23 | November 16, 1929 | Las Cruces, NM | Tie | 7 | Tie | 7 |
| 24 | November 8, 1930 | Albuquerque, NM | New Mexico A&M | 14 | New Mexico | 6 |
| 25 | November 7, 1931 | Las Cruces, NM | New Mexico A&M | 13 | New Mexico | 6 |
| 26 | October 22, 1932 | Albuquerque, NM | Tie | 0 | Tie | 0 |
| 27 | November 18, 1933 | Las Cruces, NM | New Mexico | 14 | New Mexico A&M | 7 |
| 28 | November 17, 1934 | Albuquerque, NM | New Mexico | 12 | New Mexico A&M | 6 |
| 29 | November 11, 1935 | Las Cruces, NM | New Mexico A&M | 32 | New Mexico | 0 |
| 30 | November 14, 1936 | Albuquerque, NM | New Mexico A&M | 7 | New Mexico | 6 |
| 31 | October 8, 1937 | Las Cruces, NM | New Mexico A&M | 5 | New Mexico | 0 |
| 32 | November 12, 1938 | Albuquerque, NM | New Mexico | 6 | New Mexico A&M | 2 |
| 33 | November 10, 1939 | Las Cruces, NM | New Mexico | 9 | New Mexico A&M | 6 |
| 34 | November 9, 1940 | Albuquerque, NM | New Mexico | 39 | New Mexico A&M | 6 |
| 35 | November 8, 1941 | Las Cruces, NM | New Mexico | 28 | New Mexico A&M | 0 |
| 36 | October 10, 1942 | Albuquerque, NM | New Mexico | 32 | New Mexico A&M | 0 |
| 37 | October 12, 1946 | Las Cruces, NM | New Mexico | 7 | New Mexico A&M | 6 |
| 38 | October 11, 1947 | Albuquerque, NM | New Mexico | 20 | New Mexico A&M | 0 |
| 39 | October 9, 1948 | Albuquerque, NM | New Mexico | 61 | New Mexico A&M | 0 |
| 40 | September 30, 1949 | Las Cruces, NM | New Mexico | 14 | New Mexico A&M | 13 |
| 41 | October 7, 1950 | Albuquerque, NM | New Mexico | 26 | New Mexico A&M | 13 |
| 42 | October 6, 1951 | Las Cruces, NM | New Mexico | 20 | New Mexico A&M | 0 |
| 43 | October 4, 1952 | Albuquerque, NM | New Mexico | 23 | New Mexico A&M | 0 |
| 44 | November 7, 1953 | Las Cruces, NM | New Mexico | 28 | New Mexico A&M | 6 |
| 45 | November 20, 1954 | Albuquerque, NM | New Mexico | 39 | New Mexico A&M | 27 |
| 46 | September 17, 1955 | Albuquerque, NM | New Mexico | 14 | New Mexico A&M | 7 |
| 47 | September 22, 1956 | Las Cruces, NM | New Mexico | 14 | New Mexico A&M | 6 |
| 48 | September 21, 1957 | Albuquerque, NM | New Mexico | 25 | New Mexico A&M | 7 |
| 49 | September 20, 1958 | Las Cruces, NM | New Mexico | 16 | New Mexico A&M | 7 |
| 50 | September 19, 1959 | Albuquerque, NM | New Mexico A&M | 29 | New Mexico | 12 |
| 51 | October 8, 1960 | Albuquerque, NM | New Mexico State | 34 | New Mexico | 0 |
| 52 | September 23, 1961 | Albuquerque, NM | New Mexico | 41 | New Mexico State | 7 |
| 53 | September 15, 1962 | Albuquerque, NM | New Mexico | 28 | New Mexico State | 17 |
| 54 | October 19, 1963 | Las Cruces, NM | New Mexico State | 13 | New Mexico | 12 |
| 55 | October 24, 1964 | Albuquerque, NM | New Mexico | 18 | New Mexico State | 14 |
| 56 | November 13, 1965 | Las Cruces, NM | New Mexico State | 20 | New Mexico | 6 |
| 57 | November 12, 1966 | Albuquerque, NM | New Mexico State | 47 | New Mexico | 12 |
| 58 | November 18, 1967 | Albuquerque, NM | New Mexico State | 54 | New Mexico | 7 |
| 59 | November 16, 1968 | Albuquerque, NM | New Mexico State | 33 | New Mexico | 6 |

| No. | Date | Location | Winning team | | Losing team | |
|---|---|---|---|---|---|---|
| 60 | November 22, 1969 | Las Cruces, NM | New Mexico | 24 | New Mexico State | 21 |
| 61 | October 17, 1970 | Albuquerque, NM | New Mexico | 24 | New Mexico State | 17 |
| 62 | October 9, 1971 | Albuquerque, NM | Tie | 35 | Tie | 35 |
| 63 | September 16, 1972 | Albuquerque, NM | New Mexico | 55 | New Mexico State | 20 |
| 64 | September 15, 1973 | Albuquerque, NM | New Mexico | 48 | New Mexico State | 6 |
| 65 | November 2, 1974 | Albuquerque, NM | New Mexico | 26 | New Mexico State | 24 |
| 66 | November 22, 1975 | Las Cruces, NM | New Mexico | 52 | New Mexico State | 28 |
| 67 | October 30, 1976 | Albuquerque, NM | New Mexico State | 16 | New Mexico | 7 |
| 68 | October 29, 1977 | Las Cruces, NM | New Mexico | 35 | New Mexico State | 13 |
| 69 | October 21, 1978 | Albuquerque, NM | New Mexico | 35 | New Mexico State | 20 |
| 70 | September 29, 1979 | Las Cruces, NM | New Mexico | 30 | New Mexico State | 16 |
| 71 | September 27, 1980 | Albuquerque, NM | New Mexico | 52 | New Mexico State | 19 |
| 72 | October 24, 1981 | Las Cruces, NM | New Mexico | 17 | New Mexico State | 13 |
| 73 | October 23, 1982 | Albuquerque, NM | New Mexico | 66 | New Mexico State | 14 |
| 74 | September 24, 1983 | Las Cruces, NM | New Mexico | 31 | New Mexico State | 10 |
| 75 | September 8, 1984 | Albuquerque, NM | New Mexico | 61 | New Mexico State | 21 |
| 76 | September 14, 1985 | Las Cruces, NM | New Mexico | 34 | New Mexico State | 27 |
| 77 | October 25, 1986 | Albuquerque, NM | New Mexico | 45 | New Mexico State | 14 |
| 78 | September 12, 1987 | Las Cruces, NM | New Mexico State | 17 | New Mexico | 14 |
| 79 | September 10, 1988 | Las Cruces, NM | New Mexico | 36 | New Mexico State | 34 |
| 80 | September 9, 1989 | Albuquerque, NM | New Mexico | 45 | New Mexico State | 13 |
| 81 | September 1, 1990 | Las Cruces, NM | New Mexico | 29 | New Mexico State | 12 |
| 82 | September 28, 1991 | Albuquerque, NM | New Mexico | 17 | New Mexico State | 10 |
| 83 | September 12, 1992 | Las Cruces, NM | New Mexico State | 42 | New Mexico | 39 |
| 84 | September 25, 1993 | Albuquerque, NM | New Mexico | 42 | New Mexico State | 7 |
| 85 | October 22, 1994 | Las Cruces, NM | New Mexico | 56 | New Mexico State | 31 |
| 86 | September 23, 1995 | Albuquerque, NM | New Mexico | 36 | New Mexico State | 24 |
| 87 | August 29, 1996 | Las Cruces, NM | New Mexico | 28 | New Mexico State | 7 |
| 88 | September 6, 1997 | Albuquerque, NM | New Mexico | 61 | New Mexico State | 24 |
| 89 | September 19, 1998 | Las Cruces, NM | New Mexico State | 28 | New Mexico | 27 |
| 90 | September 11, 1999 | Albuquerque, NM | New Mexico State | 35 | New Mexico | 28 |
| 91 | September 16, 2000 | Las Cruces, NM | New Mexico | 16 | New Mexico State | 13 |
| 92 | November 24, 2001 | Albuquerque, NM | New Mexico | 53 | New Mexico State | 0 |
| 93 | September 21, 2002 | Las Cruces, NM | New Mexico State | 24 | New Mexico | 13 |
| 94 | September 27, 2003 | Albuquerque, NM | New Mexico | 24 | New Mexico State | 17 |
| 95 | September 25, 2004 | Las Cruces, NM | New Mexico | 38 | New Mexico State | 3 |
| 96 | September 17, 2005 | Albuquerque, NM | New Mexico | 38 | New Mexico State | 21 |
| 97 | September 9, 2006 | Las Cruces, NM | New Mexico | 34 | New Mexico State | 28 |
| 98 | September 8, 2007 | Albuquerque, NM | New Mexico | 44 | New Mexico State | 34 |
| 99 | September 27, 2008 | Las Cruces, NM | New Mexico | 35 | New Mexico State | 24 |
| 100 | September 26, 2009 | Albuquerque, NM | New Mexico State | 20 | New Mexico | 17 |
| 101 | October 9, 2010 | Las Cruces, NM | New Mexico State | 16 | New Mexico | 14 |
| 102 | October 1, 2011 | Albuquerque, NM | New Mexico State | 42 | New Mexico | 28 |
| 103 | September 22, 2012 | Las Cruces, NM | New Mexico | 27 | New Mexico State | 14 |
| 104 | October 5, 2013 | Albuquerque, NM | New Mexico | 66 | New Mexico State | 17 |
| 105 | September 20, 2014 | Las Cruces, NM | New Mexico | 38 | New Mexico State | 35 |
| 106 | October 3, 2015 | Albuquerque, NM | New Mexico | 38 | New Mexico State | 29 |
| 107 | September 10, 2016 | Las Cruces, NM | New Mexico State | 32 | New Mexico | 31 |
| 108 | September 9, 2017 | Albuquerque, NM | New Mexico State | 30 | New Mexico | 28 |
| 109 | September 15, 2018 | Las Cruces, NM | New Mexico | 42 | New Mexico State | 25 |
| 110 | September 21, 2019 | Albuquerque, NM | New Mexico | 55 | New Mexico State | 52 |
| 111 | September 11, 2021 | Albuquerque, NM | New Mexico | 34 | New Mexico State | 25 |
| 112 | October 15, 2022 | Las Cruces, NM | New Mexico State | 21 | New Mexico | 9 |
| 113 | September 16, 2023 | Albuquerque, NM | New Mexico State | 27 | New Mexico | 17 |
| 114 | September 28, 2024 | Las Cruces, NM | New Mexico | 50 | New Mexico State | 40 |
| 115 | September 27, 2025 | Albuquerque, NM | New Mexico | 38 | New Mexico State | 20 |
| 116 | September 26, 2026 | Las Cruces, NM | New Mexico | 42 | New Mexico State | 18 |
Series: New Mexico leads 76–35–5

- Non-conference games (98: 1894–1930 and 1951–present)
- Not played in 17 seasons (1895–1904, 1907, 1910, 1918, 1943–1945 and 2020)

== Coaching records ==
Since first game on January 1, 1894

=== New Mexico ===
| Head Coach | Team | Games | Seasons | Wins | Losses | Ties | Pct. |
|---|---|---|---|---|---|---|---|
| No coach | New Mexico | 1 | 1892–1893 | 1 | 0 | 0 | 1.000 |
| W. A. Zimmer | New Mexico | 0 | 1894 | 0 | 0 | 0 | – |
No team (1895–1898)
| No coach | New Mexico | 0 | 1899 | 0 | 0 | 0 | – |
No team (1900)
| Joe Napier | New Mexico | 0 | 1901 | 0 | 0 | 0 | – |
No team (1902)
| Walter McEwan | New Mexico | 0 | 1903–1904 | 0 | 0 | 0 | – |
| Martin F. Angell | New Mexico | 2 | 1905–1907 | 0 | 2 | 0 | .000 |
| Hermon H. Conwell | New Mexico | 1 | 1908 | 1 | 0 | 0 | 1.000 |
| Sam P. McBirney | New Mexico | 1 | 1909 | 1 | 0 | 0 | 1.000 |
| Carl Hamilton | New Mexico | 0 | 1910 | 0 | 0 | 0 | – |
| Ralph Hutchinson | New Mexico | 6 | 1911–1916 | 2 | 3 | 1 | .417 |
| Frank E. Wood | New Mexico | 1 | 1917 | 0 | 1 | 0 | .000 |
No team (1918)
| John F. McGough | New Mexico | 1 | 1919 | 1 | 0 | 0 | 1.000 |
| Roy W. Johnson | New Mexico | 11 | 1920–1930 | 4 | 5 | 2 | .455 |
| Chuck Riley | New Mexico | 3 | 1931–1933 | 1 | 1 | 1 | .500 |
| Gwinn Henry | New Mexico | 3 | 1934–1936 | 1 | 2 | 0 | .333 |
| Ted Shipkey | New Mexico | 5 | 1937–1941 | 4 | 1 | 0 | .800 |
| Willis Barnes | New Mexico | 2 | 1942–1946 | 2 | 0 | 0 | 1.000 |
| Berl Huffman | New Mexico | 3 | 1947–1949 | 3 | 0 | 0 | 1.000 |
| Dudley DeGroot | New Mexico | 3 | 1950–1952 | 3 | 0 | 0 | 1.000 |
| Bob Titchenal | New Mexico | 3 | 1953–1955 | 3 | 0 | 0 | 1.000 |
| Dick Clausen | New Mexico | 2 | 1956–1957 | 2 | 0 | 0 | 1.000 |
| Marv Levy | New Mexico | 2 | 1958–1959 | 1 | 1 | 0 | .500 |
| Bill Weeks | New Mexico | 8 | 1960–1967 | 3 | 5 | 0 | .375 |
| Rudy Feldman | New Mexico | 6 | 1968–1973 | 4 | 1 | 1 | .750 |
| Bill Mondt | New Mexico | 6 | 1974–1979 | 5 | 1 | 0 | .833 |
| Joe Morrison | New Mexico | 3 | 1980–1982 | 3 | 0 | 0 | 1.000 |
| Joe Lee Dunn | New Mexico | 4 | 1983–1986 | 4 | 0 | 0 | 1.000 |
| Mike Sheppard | New Mexico | 5 | 1987–1991 | 4 | 1 | 0 | .800 |
| Dennis Franchione | New Mexico | 6 | 1992–1997 | 5 | 1 | 0 | .833 |
| Rocky Long | New Mexico | 11 | 1998–2008 | 8 | 3 | | .727 |
| Mike Locksley | New Mexico | 2 | 2009–2011 | 0 | 2 | | .000 |
| George Barlow | New Mexico | 1 | 2011 | 0 | 1 | | .000 |
| Bob Davie | New Mexico | 8 | 2012–2019 | 6 | 2 | | .750 |
| Danny Gonzales | New Mexico | 3 | 2020–2023 | 1 | 2 | | .333 |
| Bronco Mendenhall | New Mexico | 1 | 2024 | 1 | 0 | | 1.000 |
| Jason Eck | New Mexico | 2 | 2025–present | 2 | 0 | | 1.000 |

=== New Mexico State ===
| Head Coach | Team | Games | Seasons | Wins | Losses | Ties | Pct. |
|---|---|---|---|---|---|---|---|
| W. M. Clutte | New Mexico A&M | 1 | 1893 | 0 | 1 | 0 | .000 |
| Alfred Holt | New Mexico A&M | 0 | 1894 | 0 | 0 | 0 | – |
| No coach | New Mexico A&M | 0 | 1895–1896 | 0 | 0 | 0 | – |
| Charles M. Barber | New Mexico A&M | 0 | 1897–1898 | 0 | 0 | 0 | – |
| John O. Miller (a) | New Mexico A&M | 0 | 1899 | 0 | 0 | 0 | – |
| William A. Sutherland | New Mexico A&M | 0 | 1900 | 0 | 0 | 0 | – |
| John O. Miller (b) | New Mexico A&M | 2 | 1901–1907 | 2 | 0 | 0 | 1.000 |
| William G. Hummell | New Mexico A&M | 1 | 1908 | 0 | 1 | 0 | .000 |
| J. H. Squires | New Mexico A&M | 1 | 1909 | 0 | 1 | 0 | .000 |
| Art Badenoch | New Mexico A&M | 3 | 1910–1913 | 3 | 0 | 0 | 1.000 |
| Clarence W. Russell | New Mexico A&M | 3 | 1914–1916 | 0 | 2 | 1 | .167 |
| John G. Griffith | New Mexico A&M | 1 | 1917 | 1 | 0 | 0 | 1.000 |
No team (1918)
| Anthony Savage | New Mexico A&M | 1 | 1919 | 0 | 1 | 0 | .000 |
| Dutch Bergman | New Mexico A&M | 3 | 1920–1922 | 2 | 1 | 0 | .667 |
| R. R. Brown | New Mexico A&M | 3 | 1923–1925 | 2 | 1 | 0 | .667 |
| Arthur Burkholder | New Mexico A&M | 1 | 1926 | 0 | 0 | 1 | .500 |
| Ted Coffman | New Mexico A&M | 2 | 1927–1928 | 0 | 2 | 0 | .000 |
| Jerry Hines | New Mexico A&M | 11 | 1929–1939 | 5 | 4 | 2 | .545 |
| Julius H. Johnston | New Mexico A&M | 3 | 1940–1942 | 0 | 3 | 0 | .000 |
| Maurice Moulder | New Mexico A&M | 0 | 1943 | 0 | 0 | 0 | – |
No team (1944–1945)
| Raymond A. Curfman | New Mexico A&M | 2 | 1946–1947 | 0 | 2 | 0 | .000 |
| Vaughn Corley | New Mexico A&M | 3 | 1948–1950 | 0 | 3 | 0 | .000 |
| Joseph T. Coleman | New Mexico A&M | 2 | 1951–1952 | 0 | 2 | 0 | .000 |
| James Patton | New Mexico A&M | 2 | 1953–1954 | 0 | 2 | 0 | .000 |
| Tony Cavallo | New Mexico A&M | 3 | 1955–1957 | 0 | 3 | 0 | .000 |
| Warren B. Woodson | New Mexico A&M / State | 10 | 1958–1967 | 6 | 4 | 0 | .600 |
| Jim Wood | New Mexico State | 5 | 1968–1972 | 1 | 3 | 1 | .300 |
| Jim Bradley | New Mexico State | 5 | 1973–1977 | 1 | 4 | 0 | .200 |
| Gil Krueger | New Mexico State | 5 | 1978–1982 | 0 | 5 | 0 | .000 |
| Fred Zechman | New Mexico State | 3 | 1983–1985 | 0 | 3 | 0 | .000 |
| Mike Knoll | New Mexico State | 4 | 1986–1989 | 1 | 3 | 0 | .250 |
| Jim Hess | New Mexico State | 8 | 1990–1996 | 1 | 7 | 0 | .125 |
| Tony Samuel | New Mexico State | 8 | 1997–2004 | 3 | 5 | | .375 |
| Hal Mumme | New Mexico State | 4 | 2005–2008 | 0 | 4 | | .000 |
| DeWayne Walker | New Mexico State | 4 | 2009–2012 | 3 | 1 | | .750 |
| Doug Martin | New Mexico State | 8 | 2013–2021 | 2 | 6 | | .250 |
| Jerry Kill | New Mexico State | 2 | 2022–2023 | 2 | 0 | | 1.000 |
| Tony Sanchez | New Mexico State | 3 | 2024–present | 0 | 3 | | .000 |

- John O. Miller's overall record in series was 2–0–0 (1.000)

== See also ==
- List of NCAA college football rivalry games
- List of most-played college football series in NCAA Division I
