= 1940 New Mexico Lobos football team =

American college football season

1940 New Mexico Lobos football
- Conference: Border Conference
- Record: 5–4 (4–2 Border)
- Head coach: Ted Shipkey (4th season)
- Home stadium: Hilltop Stadium

1940 Border Conference football standings
	Conf.					Overall
Team	W		L		T	W		L		T
Arizona State $	3	–	0	–	1	7	–	2	–	2
Arizona	3	–	1	–	0	7	–	2	–	0
Texas Mines	3	–	1	–	1	4	–	4	–	1
New Mexico	3	–	2	–	0	5	–	4	–	0
New Mexico A&M	1	–	4	–	0	3	–	6	–	0
Texas Tech	0	–	1	–	0	9	–	1	–	1
Arizona State–Flagstaff	0	–	5	–	0	2	–	6	–	0
$ – Conference champion

The 1940 New Mexico Lobos football team represented the University of New Mexico as a member of the Border Conference during the 1940 college football season. In their fourth season under head coach Ted Shipkey, the Lobos compiled an overall record of 5–4 with a mark of 4–2 against conference opponents, finished fourth in the Border Conference, and outscored all opponents by a total of 167 to 96. After compiling a 1–4 record in the first six games, the team won its final four games, including victories over rivals New Mexico Agricultural and Arizona and an upset victory over previously undefeated and No. 18-ranked Texas Tech.

Three New Mexico players were selected as first-team players on the All-Border Conference football team selected by the Albuquerque Journal: halfback Avery Monfort; tackle Austin O'Jibway; and guard Wilbur Gentry. Gentry was named captain of the all-conference team. Halfback Jack Morrissey and guard Luksich were placed on the team.

New Mexico was ranked at No. 135 (out of 697 college football teams) in the final rankings under the Litkenhous Difference by Score system for 1940.

== Schedule ==
Date	Opponent	Site	Result	Attendance	Source
September 28	at Wyoming*	Corbett Field; Laramie, WY	L 3–7	4,500	
October 4	Silver City Teachers*	Hilltop Stadium; Albuquerque, NM	W 28–0	4,500	
October 11	Arizona State	Hilltop Stadium; Albuquerque, NM	L 6–13	> 5,000	
October 19	at Texas Mines	Sun Bowl Stadium; El Paso, TX	L 7–9	7,000	
October 26	at Colorado A&M*	DU Stadium; Denver, CO	L 6–7		
November 9	New Mexico A&M^{†}	Hilltop Stadium; Albuquerque, NM (rivalry)	W 39–6	6,500	
November 16	Arizona State–Flagstaff	Hilltop Stadium; Albuquerque, NM	W 45–26	3,500	
November 23	at Arizona	Arizona Stadium; Tucson, AZ (rivalry)	W 13–12	8,000	
November 30	No. 18 Texas Tech	Hilltop Stadium; Albuquerque, NM	W 19–14	7,000	
*Non-conference game; ^{†}Homecoming; Rankings from Coaches' Poll released prior to the game
