= 1940 Texas Mines Miners football team =

American college football season

1940 Texas Mines Miners football
- Conference: Border Conference
- Record: 4–4–1 (3–1–1 Border)
- Head coach: Mack Saxon (12th season)
- Home stadium: Kidd Field

1940 Border Conference football standings
	Conf.					Overall
Team	W		L		T	W		L		T
Arizona State $	3	–	0	–	1	7	–	2	–	2
Arizona	3	–	1	–	0	7	–	2	–	0
Texas Mines	3	–	1	–	1	4	–	4	–	1
New Mexico	3	–	2	–	0	5	–	4	–	0
New Mexico A&M	1	–	4	–	0	3	–	6	–	0
Texas Tech	0	–	1	–	0	9	–	1	–	1
Arizona State–Flagstaff	0	–	5	–	0	2	–	6	–	0
$ – Conference champion

The 1940 Texas Mines Miners football team was an American football team that represented Texas School of Mines (now known as University of Texas at El Paso) as a member of the Border Conference during the 1940 college football season. In its 12th season under head coach Mack Saxon, the team compiled a 4–4–1 record (3–1–1 against Border Conference opponents), finished third in the conference, and outscored opponents by a total of 129 to 121.

Texas Mines was ranked at No. 149 (out of 697 college football teams) in the final rankings under the Litkenhous Difference by Score system for 1940.

== Schedule ==
Date	Opponent	Site	Result	Attendance	Source
September 21	at Arizona State–Flagstaff	Skidmore Field; Flagstaff, AZ	W 28–7		
September 28	North Dakota*	Kidd Field; El Paso, TX	W 20–6		
October 5	at Louisiana Tech*	Tech Stadium; Ruston, LA	L 7–19		
October 12	vs. Hardin–Simmons*	Fly Field; Odessa, TX	L 6–14	3,000	
October 19	New Mexico	Kidd Field; El Paso, TX	W 9–7	7,000	
October 26	Arizona State	Kidd Field; El Paso, TX	T 0–0		
November 2	Arizona	Kidd Field; El Paso, TX	L 13–20		
November 11	at Fresno State*	Ratcliffe Stadium; Fresno, CA	L 6–16	10,024	
November 30	New Mexico A&M^{†}	Kidd Field; El Paso, TX (rivalry)	W 40–26		
*Non-conference game; ^{†}Homecoming
