= 1940 Utah State Aggies football team =

American college football season

1940 Utah State Aggies football
- Conference: Mountain States Conference
- Record: 2–5–1 (2–4 MSC)
- Head coach: Dick Romney (22nd season)
- Home stadium: Aggie Stadium

1940 Mountain States Conference football standings
	Conf.					Overall
Team	W		L		T	W		L		T
Utah $	5	–	1	–	0	7	–	2	–	0
Denver	4	–	1	–	1	6	–	2	–	1
Colorado	4	–	1	–	1	5	–	3	–	1
BYU	2	–	3	–	1	2	–	4	–	2
Colorado A&M	1	–	3	–	2	3	–	4	–	2
Utah State	2	–	4	–	0	2	–	5	–	1
Wyoming	0	–	5	–	1	1	–	7	–	1
$ – Conference champion

The 1940 Utah State Aggies football team was an American football team that represented Utah State Agricultural College in the Mountain States Conference (MSC) during the 1940 college football season. In their 22nd season under head coach Dick Romney, the Aggies compiled a 2–5–1 record (2–4 against MSC opponents), finished sixth in the MSC, and were outscored by a total of 104 to 48.

Utah State was ranked at No. 161 (out of 697 college football teams) in the final rankings under the Litkenhous Difference by Score system for 1940.

== Schedule ==
Date	Time	Opponent	Site	Result	Attendance	Source
September 28	2:30 p.m.	San Jose State*	Aggie Stadium; Logan, UT	L 0–19	4,000	
October 12		Colorado	Aggie Stadium; Logan, UT	L 0–26		
October 19		Utah	Aggie Stadium; Logan, UT (rivalry)	W 7–0	6,000	
October 26		at Idaho*	Public School Field; Boise, ID	T 0–0	3,500	
November 2		at BYU	"Y" Stadium; Provo, UT (rivalry)	L 7–12	6,000	
November 9		at Colorado A&M	Fort Collins, CO	L 12–13		
November 16		at Denver	DU Stadium; Denver, CO	L 6–34		
November 21		Wyoming	Aggie Stadium; Logan, UT (rivalry)	W 16–0	600	
*Non-conference game; All times are in Mountain time
