= 1940 Colorado A&M Aggies football team =

American college football season

1940 Colorado A&M Aggies football
- Conference: Mountain States Conference
- Record: 3–4–2 (1–3–2 MSC)
- Head coach: Harry W. Hughes (30th season)
- Home stadium: Colorado Field

1940 Mountain States Conference football standings
	Conf.					Overall
Team	W		L		T	W		L		T
Utah $	5	–	1	–	0	7	–	2	–	0
Denver	4	–	1	–	1	6	–	2	–	1
Colorado	4	–	1	–	1	5	–	3	–	1
BYU	2	–	3	–	1	2	–	4	–	2
Colorado A&M	1	–	3	–	2	3	–	4	–	2
Utah State	2	–	4	–	0	2	–	5	–	1
Wyoming	0	–	5	–	1	1	–	7	–	1
$ – Conference champion

The 1940 Colorado A&M Aggies football team represented Colorado State College of Agriculture and Mechanic Arts in the Mountain States Conference (MSC) during the 1940 college football season. In their 30th season under head coach Harry W. Hughes, the Aggies compiled a 3–4–2 record (1–3–2 against MSC opponents), finished fifth in the MSC, and were outscored by a total of 131 to 85.

== Schedule ==
Date	Opponent	Site	Result	Attendance	Source
September 28	vs. Colorado Mines*	Denver University Stadium; Denver, CO	W 25–0		
October 5	at Wyoming	Corbett Field; Laramie, WY (rivalry)	T 0–0	4,500	
October 12	at Denver	Denver University Stadium; Denver, CO	L 13–14	15,000	
October 19	Colorado	Colorado Field; Fort Collins, CO (rivalry)	L 14–33	7,000	
October 26	vs. New Mexico*	Denver University Stadium; Denver, CO	W 7–6		
November 9	Utah State^{†}	Colorado Field; Fort Collins, CO	W 13–12		
November 16	at Utah	Ute Stadium; Salt Lake City, UT	L 0–27		
November 23	BYU	Colorado Field; Fort Collins, CO	T 13–13		
November 28	at Kansas*	Memorial Stadium; Lawrence, KS	L 0–26	3,000	
*Non-conference game; ^{†}Homecoming
