= 1940 Wyoming Cowboys football team =

American college football season

1940 Wyoming Cowboys football
- Conference: Mountain States Conference
- Record: 1–7–1 (0–5–1 MSC)
- Head coach: Okie Blanchard (1st season)
- Captain: None
- Home stadium: Corbett Field

1940 Mountain States Conference football standings
	Conf.					Overall
Team	W		L		T	W		L		T
Utah $	5	–	1	–	0	7	–	2	–	0
Denver	4	–	1	–	1	6	–	2	–	1
Colorado	4	–	1	–	1	5	–	3	–	1
BYU	2	–	3	–	1	2	–	4	–	2
Colorado A&M	1	–	3	–	2	3	–	4	–	2
Utah State	2	–	4	–	0	2	–	5	–	1
Wyoming	0	–	5	–	1	1	–	7	–	1
$ – Conference champion

The 1940 Wyoming Cowboys football team represented the University of Wyoming in the Mountain States Conference (MSC) during the 1940 college football season. In its first and only season under head coach Okie Blanchard, the team compiled a 1–7–1 record (0–5–1 against MSC opponents), finished last in the conference, and was outscored by a total of 190 to 32.

Wyoming was ranked at No. 300 (out of 697 college football teams) in the final rankings under the Litkenhous Difference by Score system for 1940.

== Schedule ==
Date	Opponent	Site	Result	Attendance	Source
September 28	New Mexico*	Corbett Field; Laramie, WY	W 7–3	4,500	
October 5	Colorado A&M	Corbett Field; Laramie, WY (rivalry)	T 0–0	4,500	
October 11	at BYU	BYU Stadium; Provo, UT	L 0–20	5,000	
October 19	at Denver	Denver University Stadium; Denver, CO	L 9–41	11,000	
October 26	at Colorado	Colorado Stadium; Boulder, CO	L 0–62	4,000	
November 2	vs. Chadron State*	Natrona County H.S. Stadium; Casper, WY	L 9–12	3,000	
November 9	Utah	Corbett Field; Laramie, WY	L 7–34		
November 16	at Wichita*	Wichita, KS	L 0–2	4,500	
November 21	at Utah State	Aggie Stadium; Logan, UT (rivalry)	L 0–16	600	
*Non-conference game
