= 1940 Arizona Wildcats football team =

American college football season

1940 Arizona Wildcats football
- Conference: Border Conference
- Record: 7–2 (3–1 Border)
- Head coach: Mike Casteel (2nd season)
- Captain: John Black
- Home stadium: Varsity Stadium

1940 Border Conference football standings
	Conf.					Overall
Team	W		L		T	W		L		T
Arizona State $	3	–	0	–	1	7	–	2	–	2
Arizona	3	–	1	–	0	7	–	2	–	0
Texas Mines	3	–	1	–	1	4	–	4	–	1
New Mexico	3	–	2	–	0	5	–	4	–	0
New Mexico A&M	1	–	4	–	0	3	–	6	–	0
Texas Tech	0	–	1	–	0	9	–	1	–	1
Arizona State–Flagstaff	0	–	5	–	0	2	–	6	–	0
$ – Conference champion

The 1940 Arizona Wildcats football team represented the University of Arizona in the Border Conference during the 1940 college football season. In their second season under head coach Mike Casteel, the Wildcats compiled a 7–2 record (3–1 against Border opponents), finished in second place in the conference, and outscored their opponents, 204 to 83. The team captain was John Black.

Arizona was ranked at No. 76 (out of 697 college football teams) in the final rankings under the Litkenhous Difference by Score system for 1940.

The team played home games at Varsity Stadium in Tucson, Arizona.

== Schedule ==
Date	Opponent	Site	Result	Attendance	Source
September 28	Arizona State–Flagstaff*	Varsity Stadium; Tucson, AZ	W 41–0		
October 5	New Mexico A&M	Varsity Stadium; Tucson, AZ	W 41–0	8,000	
October 12	at Utah*	Ute Stadium; Salt Lake City, UT	L 0–24		
October 19	Centenary*^{†}	Varsity Stadium; Tucson, AZ	W 29–6	10,000	
October 26	vs. Oklahoma A&M*	Phoenix Union High School; Phoenix, AZ	W 24–0	9,000	
November 2	at Texas Mines	Kidd Field; El Paso, TX	W 20–13		
November 9	at Loyola (CA)*	Gilmore Stadium; Los Angeles, CA	W 20–13	8,000	
November 23	New Mexico	Varsity Stadium; Tucson, AZ (rivalry)	L 12–13	8,000	
November 30	Marquette*	Varsity Stadium; Tucson, AZ	W 17–14	9,000	
*Non-conference game; ^{†}Homecoming
