= 1940 BYU Cougars football team =

American college football season

1940 BYU Cougars football
- Conference: Mountain States Conference
- Record: 2–4–2 (2–3–1 MSC)
- Head coach: Eddie Kimball (4th season)
- Home stadium: BYU Stadium

1940 Mountain States Conference football standings
	Conf.					Overall
Team	W		L		T	W		L		T
Utah $	5	–	1	–	0	7	–	2	–	0
Denver	4	–	1	–	1	6	–	2	–	1
Colorado	4	–	1	–	1	5	–	3	–	1
BYU	2	–	3	–	1	2	–	4	–	2
Colorado A&M	1	–	3	–	2	3	–	4	–	2
Utah State	2	–	4	–	0	2	–	5	–	1
Wyoming	0	–	5	–	1	1	–	7	–	1
$ – Conference champion

The 1940 BYU Cougars football team was an American football team that represented Brigham Young University (BYU) as a member of the Mountain States Conference (MSC) during the 1940 college football season. In their fourth season under head coach Eddie Kimball, the Cougars compiled an overall record of 2–4–2 with a mark of 2–3–1 against conference opponents, finished fourth in the MSC, and were outscored by a total of 93 to 79.

BYU was ranked at No. 120 (out of 697 college football teams) in the final rankings under the Litkenhous Difference by Score system for 1940.

== Schedule ==
Date	Opponent	Site	Result	Attendance	Source
September 27	Nevada*	BYU Stadium; Provo, UT	T 6–6		
October 5	at Utah	Ute Stadium; Salt Lake City, UT (rivalry)	L 6–12	16,000	
October 11	Wyoming	BYU Stadium; Provo, UT	W 20–0	5,000	
October 18	at Texas Tech*	Tech Field; Lubbock, TX	L 12–21	7,000	
November 2	Utah State	BYU Stadium; Provo, UT (rivalry)	W 12–7		
November 9	Denver	BYU Stadium; Provo, UT	L 0–9	7,500	
November 16	at Colorado	Colorado Stadium; Boulder, CO	L 2–25		
November 23	at Colorado A&M	Colorado Field; Fort Collins, CO	T 13–13		
*Non-conference game
