= 1940 West Texas State Buffaloes football team =

American college football season

1940 West Texas State Buffaloes football

Alamo champion
- Conference: Alamo Conference
- Record: 7–3 (2–0 Alamo)
- Head coach: Jack Curtice (1st season)
- Home stadium: Buffalo Stadium

1940 Alamo Conference football standings
	Conf.					Overall
Team	W		L		T	W		L		T
West Texas State $	2	–	0	–	0	7	–	3	–	0
Texas A&I	1	–	1	–	0	6	–	3	–	0
St. Mary's (TX)	0	–	2	–	0	4	–	6	–	1
$ – Conference champion

The 1940 West Texas State Buffaloes football team represented West Texas State Teachers College—now known as West Texas A&M University—as a member of the Alamo Conference during the 1940 college football season. Led by first-year head coach Jack Curtice, the Buffaloes compiled an overall record of 7–2 with a mark of 2–0 in conference play, winning the Alamo Conference title. West Texas State played home games at Buffalo Stadium in Canyon, Texas.

== Schedule ==
Date	Time	Opponent	Site	Result	Attendance	Source
September 19	8:00 p.m.	McMurry*	Buffalo Stadium; Canyon, TX	W 20–0		
September 27	8:00 p.m.	vs. Arizona State*	Butler Field; Amarillo, TX	L 13–19	3,500	
October 5		at Western State (CO)*	Gunnison, CO	W 48–14		
October 12	10:00 p.m.	at Fresno State*	Ratcliffe Stadium; Fresno, CA	L 6–15	9,625–11,000	
October 19	2:30 p.m.	Arizona State–Flagstaff*^{†}	Buffalo Stadium; Canyon, TX	W 27–6	6,000	
October 25	8:00 p.m.	St. Benedict's*	Buffalo Stadium; Canyon, TX	W 40–14		
November 2	2:30 p.m.	Hardin–Simmons*	Buffalo Stadium; Canyon, TX	L 7–28		
November 16	2:30 p.m.	Oklahoma City*	Buffalo Stadium; Canyon, TX	W 25–0		
November 23	2:30 p.m.	Texas A&I	Buffalo Stadium; Canyon, TX	W 26–6		
November 29		at St. Mary's (TX)	San Antonio, TX	W 28–0		
*Non-conference game; ^{†}Homecoming; All times are in Central time
