= 1940 Utah Utes football team =

American college football season

1940 Utah Utes football

MSC champion
- Conference: Mountain States Conference
- Record: 7–2 (5–1 MSC)
- Head coach: Ike Armstrong (16th season)
- Home stadium: Ute Stadium

1940 Mountain States Conference football standings
	Conf.					Overall
Team	W		L		T	W		L		T
Utah $	5	–	1	–	0	7	–	2	–	0
Denver	4	–	1	–	1	6	–	2	–	1
Colorado	4	–	1	–	1	5	–	3	–	1
BYU	2	–	3	–	1	2	–	4	–	2
Colorado A&M	1	–	3	–	2	3	–	4	–	2
Utah State	2	–	4	–	0	2	–	5	–	1
Wyoming	0	–	5	–	1	1	–	7	–	1
$ – Conference champion

The 1940 Utah Utes football team, also commonly known as the Utah Redskins, was an American football team that represented the University of Utah as a member of the Mountain States Conference (MSC) during the 1940 college football season. In their 16th season under head coach Ike Armstrong, the Redskins compiled an overall record of 7–2 record with mark of 5–1 in conference play, won the MSC title, and outscored all opponents by a total of 169 to 87.

Rex Geary was the team captain. Four Utah players received recognition on the 1940 All-Mountain States football team: end Carlos Soffe; tackle Floyd Spendlove; guard Rex Geary; and halfback Izzy Spector.

Utah's season opener against Santa Clara was part of the first-ever major college football doubleheader. The event at Kezar Stadium in San Francisco also featured the future Rose Bowl champions, the Stanford "Wow Boys", defeating San Francisco, 27—0.

Utah was ranked at No. 66 (out of 697 college football teams) in the final rankings under the Litkenhous Difference by Score system for 1940.

== Schedule ==
Date	Opponent	Site	Result	Attendance	Source
September 28	at Santa Clara*	Kezar Stadium; San Francisco, CA	L 13–34	40,000	
October 5	BYU	Ute Stadium; Salt Lake City, UT (rivalry)	W 12–6	16,000	
October 12	Arizona*	Ute Stadium; Salt Lake City, UT	W 24–0		
October 19	at Utah State	Aggie Stadium; Logan, UT (rivalry)	L 0–7	6,000	
October 26	Denver^{†}	Ute Stadium; Salt Lake City, UT	W 25–14		
November 2	at Colorado	Colorado Stadium; Boulder, CO (rivalry)	W 21–13	17,000	
November 9	at Wyoming	Corbett Field; Laramie, WY	W 34–7		
November 16	Colorado A&M	Ute Stadium; Salt Lake City, UT	W 27–0		
November 21	Idaho*	Ute Stadium; Salt Lake City, UT	W 13–6	4,113	
*Non-conference game; ^{†}Homecoming
