= 1940 Texas Tech Red Raiders football team =

American college football season

1940 Texas Tech Red Raiders football
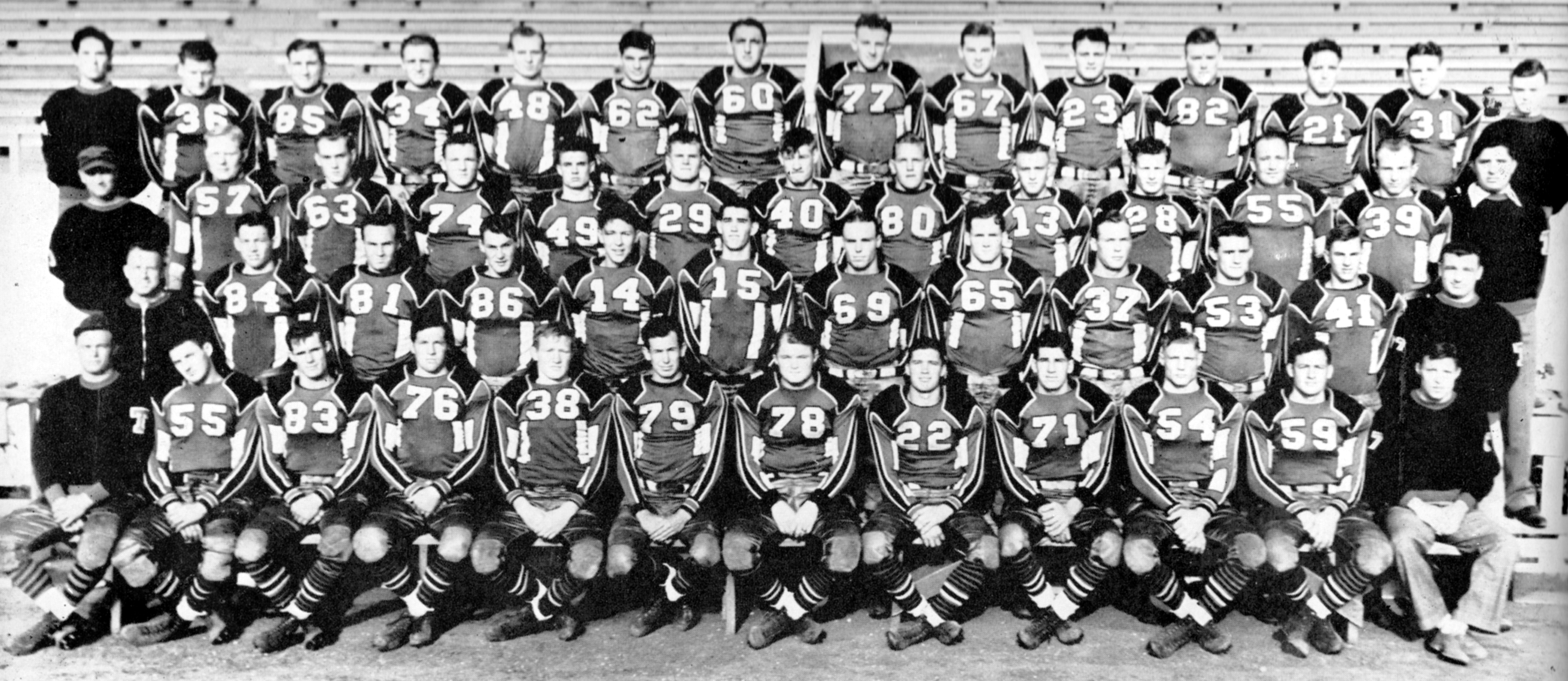
- 1940 Texas Tech football team
- Conference: Border Conference
- Record: 9–1–1 (0–1 Border)
- Head coach: Pete Cawthon (11th season)
- Offensive scheme: Single-wing
- Base defense: 6–2
- Home stadium: Tech Field

1940 Border Conference football standings
	Conf.					Overall
Team	W		L		T	W		L		T
Arizona State $	3	–	0	–	1	7	–	2	–	2
Arizona	3	–	1	–	0	7	–	2	–	0
Texas Mines	3	–	1	–	1	4	–	4	–	1
New Mexico	3	–	2	–	0	5	–	4	–	0
New Mexico A&M	1	–	4	–	0	3	–	6	–	0
Texas Tech	0	–	1	–	0	9	–	1	–	1
Arizona State–Flagstaff	0	–	5	–	0	2	–	6	–	0
$ – Conference champion

The 1940 Texas Tech Red Raiders football team represented Texas Technological College—now known as Texas Tech University—as a member of the Border Conference during the 1940 college football season. Led by Pete Cawthon in his 11th and final season as head coach, the Red Raiders compiled an overall record of 9–1–1 with a mark of 0–1 in conference play.

Texas Tech was ranked at No. 70 (out of 697 college football teams) in the final rankings under the Litkenhous Difference by Score system for 1940.

The team played home games at Tech Field in Lubbock, Texas.

== Schedule ==
Date	Opponent	Rank	Site	Result	Attendance	Source
September 27	vs. Oklahoma A&M*		Taft Stadium; Oklahoma City, OK	T 6–6	9,000	
October 5	Loyola (CA)*		Tech Field; Lubbock, TX	W 19–0	9,000	
October 12	at Montana*		Dornblaser Field; Missoula, MT	W 32–19		
October 18	BYU*		Tech Field; Lubbock, TX	W 21–20	7,000	
October 26	at Marquette*		Marquette Stadium; Milwaukee, WI	W 20–13	8,000	
November 1	Miami (FL)*		Tech Field; Lubbock, TX	W 61–14	9,000	
November 11	Centenary*		Tech Field; Lubbock, TX	W 26–6	8,000	
November 16	Wake Forest*^{†}		Tech Field; Lubbock, TX	W 12–7	10,000	
November 21	at Saint Louis*	No. 20	Walsh Stadium; St. Louis, MO	W 7–6	9,272	
November 30	at New Mexico	No. 18	Hilltop Stadium; Albuquerque, NM	L 14–19	7,000	
December 7	at San Francisco*		Kezar Stadium; San Francisco, CA	W 23–21	7,000	
*Non-conference game; ^{†}Homecoming; Rankings from AP Poll released prior to the game

== Rankings ==
Ranking movements Legend: ██ Increase in ranking ██ Decrease in ranking — = Not ranked т = Tied with team above or below
	Week							
Poll	1 Oct 14	2 Oct 21	3 Oct 28	4 Nov 4	5 Nov 11	6 Nov 18	7 Nov 25	Final Dec 2
AP	—	—	—	—	—	20-T	18-T	—
