= 1940 Arizona State Bulldogs football team =

American college football season

1940 Arizona State Bulldogs football

Border champion

Sun Bowl, L 13–26 vs. Western Reserve
- Conference: Border Conference
- Record: 7–2–2 (3–0–1 Border)
- Head coach: Dixie Howell (3rd season)
- Captains: Sam Andrews; Albert Sanserino
- Home stadium: Goodwin Stadium

1940 Border Conference football standings
	Conf.					Overall
Team	W		L		T	W		L		T
Arizona State $	3	–	0	–	1	7	–	2	–	2
Arizona	3	–	1	–	0	7	–	2	–	0
Texas Mines	3	–	1	–	1	4	–	4	–	1
New Mexico	3	–	2	–	0	5	–	4	–	0
New Mexico A&M	1	–	4	–	0	3	–	6	–	0
Texas Tech	0	–	1	–	0	9	–	1	–	1
Arizona State–Flagstaff	0	–	5	–	0	2	–	6	–	0
$ – Conference champion

The 1940 Arizona State Bulldogs football team was an American football team that represented Arizona State Teachers College (later renamed Arizona State University) in the Border Conference during the 1940 college football season. In their third season under head coach Dixie Howell, the Bulldogs compiled a 7–2–2 record (3–0–1 against Border opponents), won the conference championship, lost to Western Reserve in the 1941 Sun Bowl, and outscored their opponents by a combined total of 198 to 100.

The Bulldogs finished 4-0-1 at home, 3-1-1 on the road, and 0-1 on a neutral site. Hilman Walker was an assistant coach. The team captains were left end Sam Andrews and halfback Albert Sanserino. All home games were played at Goodwin Stadium in Tempe, Arizona.

== Schedule ==
Date	Time	Opponent	Site	Result	Attendance	Source
September 21		Cal Aggies*	Goodwin Stadium; Tempe, AZ	W 21–13		
September 27	7:00 p.m.	vs. West Texas State*	Butler Field; Amarillo, TX	W 19–13	3,500	
October 5		vs. Hardin–Simmons*	Lion Stadium; Tyler, TX	L 0–17	11,000	
October 11		at New Mexico	Hilltop Stadium; Albuquerque, NM	W 13–6	> 5,000	
October 19		New Mexico A&M	Goodwin Stadium; Tempe, AZ	W 42–6		
October 26		at Texas Mines	Kidd Field; El Paso, TX	T 0–0		
November 2		at Arizona State–Flagstaff	Skidmore Field; Flagstaff, AZ	W 12–0		
November 9		Gonzaga*	Goodwin Stadium; Tempe, AZ	T 7–7		
November 16		Colorado State–Greeley^{†}*	Goodwin Stadium; Tempe, AZ	W 41–0	5,000	
November 23		North Dakota*	Goodwin Stadium; Tempe, AZ	W 30–12		
January 1, 1941		vs. Western Reserve*	Kidd Field; El Paso, TX (Sun Bowl)	L 13–26	12,000	
*Non-conference game; ^{†}Homecoming; All times are in Mountain time

== Game summaries ==
=== Regular season ===
In the season opener, Arizona State Teacher's College defeated Cal Poly 21–13 at Goodwin Stadium. The Bulldogs outlasted West Texas State 19–13 on the road. ASTC was shutout 17–0 at Hardin–Simmons. The Bulldogs rebounded with a 13–6 road victory against New Mexico. Arizona State Teacher's College prevailed for a 42–6 home win over New Mexico A&M. The Bulldogs ended in a 0–0 tie at Texas Mines. ASTC delivered a 12–0 road shutout victory against Arizona State–Flagstaff. The Bulldogs ended in a 7–7 tie against Gonzaga in Tempe. Arizona State Teacher's College shutout Colorado State–Greeley 41–0 at Goodwin Stadium. In the home finale, the Bulldogs defeated North Dakota 30–12. It marked the only meeting between the teams in school history.

=== Sun Bowl ===
On January 1, 1941, Arizona State lost to Western Reserve 26–13 in the 1941 Sun Bowl. It marked the only meeting between the teams in school history. The game was played at Kidd Field in El Paso, Texas with a crowd of 12,000 on hand. Joe Hernandez threw a 10-yard touchdown pass to fullback Wayne Pitts for a Bulldogs score, but the extra point failed. Halfback Hascall Henshaw recorded a 94-yard rushing touchdown for Arizona State, which stood as the longest run from scrimmage in Arizona State football history until 1968. Henshaw finished with 147 rushing yards in the bowl game. Case Western Reserve's scoring started with a one-yard touchdown run by Steve Belichick, who is the father of NFL head coach Bill Belichick. Willis Waggle's 10-yard return of a blocked punt for a touchdown, Richard Booth's five-yard touchdown run, and Johnny Reis' three-yard touchdown run completed the scoring plays for Case Western Reserve.

== Roster ==
The usual Arizona State lineup included left end Sam Andrews, left tackle Olin Mason, left guard Frank Consentino, center Ray Green, right guard Clayton Peterson, right tackle Barney Rouse, right end Bob Lackey, quarterback Walt Ruth, halfbacks Hascall Henshaw and Albert Sanserino, and fullback Wayne Pitts.

Bob Baccus, John Balshor, Dominic Campolo, Phil Coleman, and Bill Davis were also on the roster.

== Awards and honors ==
Four Arizona State players received All-Border Conference honors in 1940: Sam Andrews, Ray Green, Hascall Henshaw, and Albert Sanserino. For Sanserino, it was his third consecutive year receiving All-Border Conference honors.
