= 1940 Arizona State–Flagstaff Lumberjacks football team =

American college football season

1940 Arizona State–Flagstaff Lumberjacks football
- Conference: Border Conference
- Record: 2–6 (0–5 Border)
- Head coach: Maurice Moulder (1st season)
- Home stadium: Skidmore Field

1940 Border Conference football standings
	Conf.					Overall
Team	W		L		T	W		L		T
Arizona State $	3	–	0	–	1	7	–	2	–	2
Arizona	3	–	1	–	0	7	–	2	–	0
Texas Mines	3	–	1	–	1	4	–	4	–	1
New Mexico	3	–	2	–	0	5	–	4	–	0
New Mexico A&M	1	–	4	–	0	3	–	6	–	0
Texas Tech	0	–	1	–	0	9	–	1	–	1
Arizona State–Flagstaff	0	–	5	–	0	2	–	6	–	0
$ – Conference champion

The 1940 Arizona State–Flagstaff Lumberjacks football team represented Arizona State Teachers College at Flagstaff (now known as Northern Arizona University) as a member of the Border Conference during the 1940 college football season. Led by first-year head coach Maurice Moulder, the Lumberjacks compiled an overall record of 2–6, with a conference record of 0–5, and finished seventh in the Border.

Arizona State–Flagstaff was ranked at No. 381 (out of 697 college football teams) in the final rankings under the Litkenhous Difference by Score system for 1940.

== Schedule ==
Date	Opponent	Site	Result	Attendance	Source
September 21	Texas Mines	Skidmore Field; Flagstaff, AZ	L 7–28		
September 28	at Arizona	Varsity Stadium; Tucson, AZ	L 0–41		
October 12	Caltech*	Skidmore Field; Flagstaff, AZ	W 14–33		
October 19	at West Texas State*	Buffalo Stadium; Canyon, TX	L 6–27	6,000	
October 25	at New Mexico A&M	Quesenberry Field; Las Cruces, NM	L 0–13		
November 2	Arizona State	Skidmore Field; Flagstaff, AZ	L 0–12		
November 9	at Silver City Teachers*	Silver City, NM	W 21–0		
November 16	at New Mexico	Hilltop Stadium; Albuquerque, NM	L 26–45	3,500	
*Non-conference game
