= 1940 Colorado Buffaloes football team =

American college football season

1940 Colorado Buffaloes football
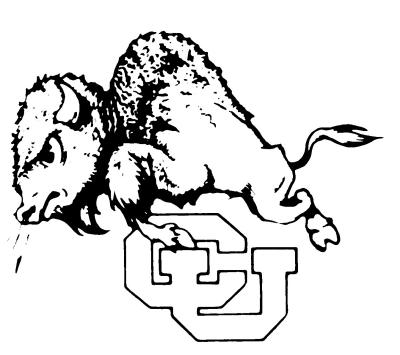
- Conference: Mountain States Conference
- Record: 5–3–1 (4–1–1 MSC)
- Head coach: Frank Potts (1st season)
- Captain: Game captains
- Home stadium: Colorado Stadium

1940 Mountain States Conference football standings
	Conf.					Overall
Team	W		L		T	W		L		T
Utah $	5	–	1	–	0	7	–	2	–	0
Denver	4	–	1	–	1	6	–	2	–	1
Colorado	4	–	1	–	1	5	–	3	–	1
BYU	2	–	3	–	1	2	–	4	–	2
Colorado A&M	1	–	3	–	2	3	–	4	–	2
Utah State	2	–	4	–	0	2	–	5	–	1
Wyoming	0	–	5	–	1	1	–	7	–	1
$ – Conference champion

The 1940 Colorado Buffaloes football team was an American football team that represented the University of Colorado as a member of the Mountain States Conference (MSC) during the 1940 college football season. Led by first-year head coach Frank Potts, the Buffaloes compiled an overall record of 5–3–1 with a mark of 4–1–1 in conference play, tying for second place in the MSC.

Colorado was ranked at No. 68 (out of 697 college football teams) in the final rankings under the Litkenhous Difference by Score system for 1940.

== Schedule ==
Date	Opponent	Site	Result	Attendance	Source
September 28	at Texas*	War Memorial Stadium; Austin, TX	L 7–39		
October 5	Kansas State*	Colorado Stadium; Boulder, CO (rivalry)	W 7–6		
October 12	at Utah State	Aggie Stadium; Logan, UT	W 26–0		
October 19	at Colorado A&M	Colorado Field; Fort Collins, CO (rivalry)	W 33–14	7,000	
October 26	Wyoming	Colorado Stadium; Boulder, CO	W 62–0	4,000	
November 2	Utah^{†}	Colorado Stadium; Boulder, CO (rivalry)	L 13–21	17,000	
November 9	Missouri*	Colorado Stadium; Boulder, CO	L 6–21		
November 16	BYU	Colorado Stadium; Boulder, CO	W 25–2		
November 21	at Denver	DU Stadium; Denver, CO	T 3–3		
*Non-conference game; ^{†}Homecoming

== After the season ==
=== NFL draft ===
The following Buffaloes were selected in the 1941 NFL draft following the season.

Round	Pick	Player	Position	NFL club
3	24	Leo Stasica	Back	Brooklyn Dodgers
12	104	Harold Punches	Guard	Cleveland Rams
