= Iola High School =

Location
- 300 East Jackson Street; Iola, Kansas 66749; 37°55′26″N 95°24′02″W

Information
- School type: Public high school
- School district: USD 257
- Principal: Scott Carson
- Staff: 22.00 (FTE)
- Grades: 9-12
- Enrollment: 322 (2023–2024)
- Student to teacher ratio: 14.64
- Campus: Rural
- Colors: Blue and Gold
- Athletics conference: Pioneer League
- Mascot: Mustang
- Rival: Anderson County High School; Chanute High School
- Website: ihs.usd257.org

Iola High School is a fully accredited high school located in Iola, Kansas, United States, serving students in grades 9–12. The current principal is Scott Carson. The mascot is Marv the Mustang. The school colors are blue and gold.

== Extracurricular activities ==
=== Athletics ===
The Mustangs compete in the Pioneer League and are classified as a 4A school, by the KSHSAA. Throughout the history of Iola athletics, the Mustangs have won 3 state championships and the Fillies have won 1 (see table below).

=== State championships ===
State Championships
Season	Sport	Number of Championships	Year
Fall	Cross Country, Boys	1	1969
Winter	Basketball, Girls	1	2006
Spring	Track & Field, Boys	2	1976, 1993
Total		4	

== See also ==
- List of high schools in Kansas
- List of unified school districts in Kansas
