= Okie Blanchard =

Biographical details
- Born: April 10, 1903; Tiona, Pennsylvania, U.S.
- Died: September 10, 1989 (aged 86); Sun City, Arizona, U.S.

Playing career

Football
- 1922–1924: Wyoming

Coaching career (HC unless noted)

Football
- 1940: Wyoming

Administrative career (AD unless noted)
- 1940–1941: Wyoming

Head coaching record
- Overall: 1–7–1 (college football)

Clair H. "Okie" Blanchard (April 10, 1903 – September 10, 1989), sometimes spelled "Oakie", was an American football player, coach of football and basketball, and college athletics administrator.

His collegiate coaching career lasted one season, in 1940 with the University of Wyoming's Cowboys. His record was 1–7–1, earning the victory (7–3 over New Mexico) in his initial game, and the tie (scoreless against Colorado State) in his second.

He was more successful as a high school coach, serving in that capacity in Cheyenne, Wyoming for many years. The football stadium at Cheyenne East High School there (which was also used by Cheyenne Central High School until 2000) is named for Blanchard. Blanchard also coached high school basketball in Cheyenne until 1958.

Blanchard was a graduate of the University of Wyoming, and in 1968 was one of the recipients of the Distinguished Alumni Award granted by the Alumni Association of that institution. In 1984, Blanchard was elected to the Wyoming Coaches Association Hall of Fame.

Blanchard died in 1989.

== Head coaching record ==
=== College football ===
Year	Team	Overall	Conference	Standing	Bowl/playoffs
Wyoming Cowboys (Mountain States Conference) (1940)
1940	Wyoming	1–7–1	0–5–1	7th	
Wyoming:		1–7–1	0–5–1		
Total:		1–7–1			
