= Jack Curtice =

American sportsman (1907–1982)

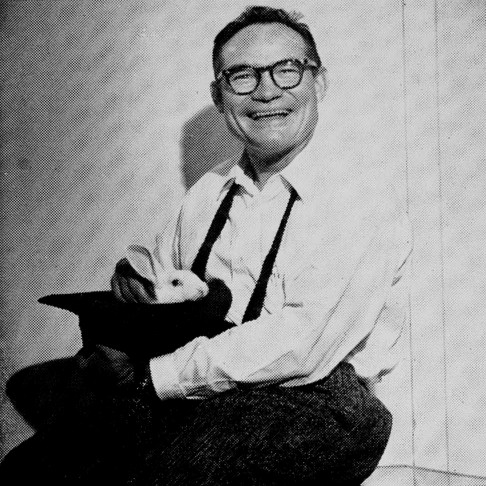
- Curtice performing a hat-trick, circa 1955

Biographical details
- Born: May 24, 1907; Glasgow, Kentucky, U.S.
- Died: August 19, 1982 (aged 75); Santa Barbara, California, U.S.

Coaching career (HC unless noted)
- 1932–1937: Owensboro HS (KY)
- 1938–1939: West Texas State (assistant)
- 1940–1941: West Texas State
- 1946–1949: Texas Mines / Texas Western
- 1950–1957: Utah
- 1958–1962: Stanford
- 1963–1969: UC Santa Barbara

Administrative career (AD unless noted)
- 1942–1950: Texas Western
- 1950–1956: Utah
- 1965–1973: UC Santa Barbara

Head coaching record
- Overall: 135–115–8 (college); 32–22–2 (high school)
- Bowls: 1–2

Accomplishments and honors

Championships
- 4 Skyline (1951–1953, 1957)

Awards
- Amos Alonzo Stagg Award (1972)

Jack Camp "Cactus Jack" Curtice Jr. (May 24, 1907 – August 19, 1982) was an American football coach and college athletics administrator. Curtice served as the head football coach West Texas State (1940–1941), Texas Western (1946–1949), Utah (1950–1957), Stanford (1958–1962), and UC Santa Barbara (1962–1969). His teams were known for their passing offenses. His overall record was 135–115–8.

== Early years ==
Curtice was born in Glasgow, Kentucky, in 1907. He attended Louisville Male High School, where he played football, basketball, and baseball and ran hurdles for the track team. He next attended Transylvania University, where he again played football, basketball, and baseball. He was the quarterback on the Transylvania football team for four years. He won all-Kentucky honors in both football and basketball.

In 1930, Curtice began his coaching career as the basketball and football coach at Elizabethtown High School in Elizabethtown, Kentucky. In two years as the football coach at Elizabethtown, his teams won 14 of 18 games and outscored opponents, 542 to 88. His basketball teams won 47 of 53 games.

In May 1932, Curtice was hired as the athletics coach and history teacher at Owensboro High School in Owensboro, Kentucky. He was a coach there from until he was granted a release from his contract in May 1938.

== College coaching career ==
=== West Texas State ===
In 1938, Curtice was hired at West Texas State in Canyon, Texas, as a professor of physical education and freshman coach in all sports. He became an assistant coach for the varsity football team in 1939 and was appointed head coach in December 1939. As head coach at West Texas State, Curtice's 1940 team compiled a 7–3 record and won the Alamo Conference championship. His 1941 squad finished in third place in its first season in the Border Conference and compiled an 8–2 record.

=== Texas Western and Navy ===
In January 1942, Curtice was hired as the athletic director and head football coach at the Texas School of Mines (later renamed University of Texas at El Paso). However, he entered the United States Navy before the season began and was unable to begin his coaching duties until after World War II ended.

During the war, Curtice served at Naval Station Norfolk where he coached a basketball team. He was also assigned to duty in the Aleutian Islands and with the Saint Mary's Pre-Flight School.

Curtice returned to Texas Mines in October 1945, but the school did not field a football team that year. He served as the school's head coach for four years from 1946 to 1949, compiling an overall record of 24–13–3. His 1948 and 1949 squads compiled identical 8–2–1 records and appeared in back-to-back Sun Bowls.

=== Utah ===
In June 1950, Curtice was hired to replace Ike Armstrong as the head football coach at Utah. In eight years as the head coach at Utah, Curtice's teams won four Skyline Conference championships and compiled a 45–32–4 record (32–9–2 against Skyline opponents).

=== Stanford ===
In January 1958, Curtice was hired as the head football coach at Stanford. Curtice coached at Stanford for five seasons. His teams did not have a winning record in any of those years. His overall record at Stanford was 14–36 (5–19 against conference opponents). He was fired in November 1962.

=== UC Santa Barbara ===
In February 1963, Curtice was hired as the head football coach at UC Santa Barbara. His 1965 UC Santa Barbara Gauchos football team compiled an 8–1 record in the regular season, and Curtice received the NCAA College Division Coach of the Year award. In seven seasons at Santa Barbara, his teams compiled a 37–29–1 record.

Curtice retired from coaching in January 1970. In a coaching career that spanned 40 years, he developed a reputation as an innovator and advocate of the passing game. His 1957 Utah Redskins football team led the country in passing, and during the decade from 1950 to 1960, he coached seven quarterbacks, including Lee Grosscup and Dick Norman, who ranked in the top 10 in passing. He also wrote a book titled "The Passing Game".

== Later years ==
Curtice remained as athletic director at UC Santa Barbara until his retirement in January 1973.

He died at his home in Santa Barbara, California, on August 19, 1982.

== Head coaching record ==
=== College ===
| Year | Team | Overall | Conference | Standing | Bowl/playoffs |
|---|---|---|---|---|---|
West Texas State Buffaloes (Alamo Conference) (1940–1941)
| 1940 | West Texas State | 7–3 | 2–0 | 1st | |
West Texas State Buffaloes (Border Conference) (1941)
| 1941 | West Texas State | 8–2 | 4–1 | 3rd | |
| West Texas State: | | 15–5 | | | |
Texas Mines / Texas Western Miners (Border Conference) (1946–1949)
| 1946 | Texas Mines | 3–6 | 2–4 | 7th | |
| 1947 | Texas Mines | 5–3–1 | 3–3–1 | 5th | |
| 1948 | Texas Mines | 8–2–1 | 4–1–1 | 2nd | L Sun |
| 1949 | Texas Western | 8–2–1 | 4–2 | T–3rd | W Sun |
| Texas Western: | | 24–13–3 | 13–10–2 | | |
Utah Utes (Skyline Conference) (1950–1957)
| 1950 | Utah | 3–4–3 | 1–2–2 | 4th | |
| 1951 | Utah | 7–4 | 4–1 | 1st | |
| 1952 | Utah | 6–3–1 | 5–0 | 1st | |
| 1953 | Utah | 8–2 | 5–0 | 1st | |
| 1954 | Utah | 4–7 | 3–3 | T–4th | |
| 1955 | Utah | 6–3 | 4–1 | 2nd | |
| 1956 | Utah | 5–5 | 5–1 | 2nd | |
| 1957 | Utah | 6–4 | 5–1 | 1st | |
| Utah: | | 45–32–4 | 32–9–2 | | |
Stanford Indians (Pacific Coast Conference) (1958)
| 1958 | Stanford | 2–8 | 2–5 | 7th | |
Stanford Indians (Athletic Association of Western Universities) (1959–1962)
| 1959 | Stanford | 3–7 | 0–4 | 5th | |
| 1960 | Stanford | 0–10 | 0–4 | 5th | |
| 1961 | Stanford | 4–6 | 1–3 | T–4th | |
| 1962 | Stanford | 5–5 | 2–3 | 4th | |
| Stanford: | | 14–36 | 5–19 | | |
UC Santa Barbara Gauchos (NCAA College Division independent) (1963–1968)
| 1963 | UC Santa Barbara | 4–5 | | | |
| 1964 | UC Santa Barbara | 4–7 | | | |
| 1965 | UC Santa Barbara | 8–2 | | | L Camellia |
| 1966 | UC Santa Barbara | 6–4 | | | |
| 1967 | UC Santa Barbara | 5–5 | | | |
| 1968 | UC Santa Barbara | 4–4–1 | | | |
UC Santa Barbara Gauchos (Pacific Coast Athletic Association) (1969)
| 1969 | UC Santa Barbara | 6–4 | 1–3 | T–5th | |
| UC Santa Barbara: | | 37–29–1 | 1–3 | | |
| Total: | | 135–115–8 | | | |
National championship Conference title Conference division title or championship game berth
