= Maurice Moulder =

American football player and coach (1900–1983)

Biographical details
- Born: November 28, 1900; Linn Creek, Missouri, U.S.
- Died: November 6, 1983 (aged 82); Anthony, New Mexico, U.S.
- Education: University of Missouri (BA)

Playing career

Football
- 1923–1925: Missouri
- Position: Quarterback

Coaching career (HC unless noted)

Football
- 1928–1933: Higginsville HS (MO)
- 1934–1936: New Mexico (assistant)
- 1937–1938: Iola HS (KS)
- 1939: Iola
- 1940–1942: Arizona State–Flagstaff
- 1943: New Mexico A&M
- 1950–1953: Gadsden HS (NM)

Basketball
- 1928–1934: Higginsville HS (MO)
- 1934–1937: New Mexico (freshmen)
- 1937–1939: Iola HS (KS)
- 1939–1940: Iola

Track and field
- 1934–1937: New Mexico (freshmen)
- 1940–?: Arizona State–Flagstaff

Administrative career (AD unless noted)
- 1939–1940: Iola

Head coaching record
- Overall: 10–16 (college football); 17–2 (junior college basketball)

Accomplishments and honors

Championships
- Basketball; 1 KJCC East Division (1940)

Maurice Morgan Moulder (November 28, 1900 – November 6, 1983) was an American football, basketball, and track and field coach and athletics administrator. He served as the head football coach at Arizona State Teachers College at Flagstaff—now known as Northern Arizona University—from 1940 to 1942 and the New Mexico College of Agriculture and Mechanic Arts—now known as New Mexico State University—in 1943, compiling a career college football head coaching record of 10–16.

Moulder was born in Linn Creek, Missouri, and attended public schools in Kansas City, Missouri, including Manual High School—now known as Manual Career & Technical Center—where he played football and ran track. He played college football as a quarterback as the University of Missouri under head coach Gwinn Henry as a quarterback from 1923 to 1925. He also competed in track at Missouri. Moulder began his coaching career in 1926 as Missouri assistant freshman football coach.

In 1928, Moulder was hired as football coach at Higginsville High School in Higginsville, Missouri. He also coached basketball at Higginsville. Moulder rejoined Henry in 1934 as an assistant football coach at the University of New Mexico. He assisted Henry with the New Mexico Lobos football team for three seasons, through 1936, and also was head coach of New Mexico's freshman basketball and track teams. Moulder left New Mexico in 1937 to coach at Iola High School in Iola, Kansas. There he coached football and basketball for two years before moving to Iola Junior College–now known as Allen Community College. He led the Iola Junior College basketball team to a record of 17–2 and the East Division title of the Kansas Junior College Conference (KJCC) in the 1939–40 season. Moulder was appointed head football and track coach at Arizona State Teachers College at Flagstaff—now known as Northern Arizona University—in 1940.

Moulder died on November 6, 1983, at a nursing home in Anthony, New Mexico.

== Head coaching record ==
=== College football ===
Year	Team	Overall	Conference	Standing	Bowl/playoffs
Arizona State Flagstaff–Lumberjacks (Border Conference) (1940–1942)
1940	Arizona State–Flagstaff	2–6	0–5	7th	
1941	Arizona State–Flagstaff	3–5	1–5	8th	
1942	Arizona State–Flagstaff	1–5	1–4	8th	
Arizona State–Flagstaff:		6–16	2–14		
New Mexico A&M Aggies (Border Conference) (1943)
1943	New Mexico A&M	4–0	0–0	NA	
New Mexico A&M:		4–0	0–0		
Total:		10–16			
