= Alfred Holt (American football) =

American football coach and academic

Biographical details
- Born: December 1866; Arkansas, U.S.
- Died: 1901 (aged 34–35); Las Cruces, New Mexico, U.S.
- Education: New Mexico A&M (MS, 1896)

Coaching career (HC unless noted)
- 1895: New Mexico A&M

Head coaching record
- Overall: 2–0

Alfred Moss Holt (December 1866 – 1901) was an American college football coach and academic. He served as the head football coach at New Mexico College of Agriculture and Mechanic Arts–now known as New Mexico State University–in 1895, compiling a record of 2–0. He graduated from New Mexico A&M in 1896 with a master's degree, making him the first graduate student in the history of the school.

== Head coaching record ==
| Year | Team | Overall | Conference | Standing | Bowl/playoffs |
|---|---|---|---|---|---|
New Mexico A&M Aggies (Independent) (1895)
| 1895 | New Mexico A&M | 2–0 | | | |
| New Mexico A&M: | | 2–0 | | | |
| Total: | | 2–0 | | | |
