= Utah State–Wyoming football rivalry =

College football rivalry

- Utah State Aggies Wyoming Cowboys
- Sport: Football
- First meeting: November 23, 1903; Utah A.C. 46, Wyoming 0
- Latest meeting: October 26, 2024; Utah State 27, Wyoming 25
- Stadiums: Maverik Stadium; Logan, Utah, U.S. War Memorial Stadium; Laramie, Wyoming, U.S.
- Trophy: Bridger Rifle

Statistics
- Total meetings: 73
- All-time series: Utah State leads, 41–28–4 (.589)
- Trophy series: Utah State leads, 6–4 (.600)
- Largest victory: Utah State, 57–0 (1917)
- Longest win streak: Utah State, 10 (1927–1937)
- Current win streak: Utah State, 1 (2024–present)

Locations of Utah State and Wyoming

The Utah State–Wyoming football rivalry is an American college football rivalry between the Utah State Aggies and the Wyoming Cowboys. The rivalry is one of the oldest for both schools; it is Utah State's fourth-oldest rivalry and Wyoming's fifth. The schools played for the first time in 1903, a 46–0 Aggie victory and Utah State leads the series 41–28–4 (.589).

On November 25, 2013, "Bridger’s Battle" was announced as the name for the rivalry, after American frontiersman Jim Bridger (1804–1881), who spent much of his career in the region. A .50 caliber Rocky Mountain Hawken rifle was announced as the trophy for the rivalry, widely considered to be what Bridger carried.

== Meetings ==
Utah State and Wyoming have a storied history dating back to the early 1900s as both schools were members of the Rocky Mountain Athletic Conference (RMAC) from 1916–37 and later members of the Mountain States Conference from 1938–61. Following the dissolution of the Mountain States Conference in 1962, Utah State and Wyoming continued to play almost every year until 1978, then did not play again until 2001. They would meet only four additional times from 2003 to 2011. Until 1947, Utah State dominated the series with a 24–4–1 record. However, since the 1947 game Wyoming has been the better team, boasting a 24–16–3 record against the Aggies.

Utah State joined the Mountain West Conference in 2013 and was placed in the same division as Wyoming; the rivalry was renewed and is again played on an annual basis. The 2020 matchup, scheduled to be played in Laramie, was cancelled due to a spike in cases of COVID-19 within the Utah State program amid the ongoing pandemic.

The game was not played in 2023, as the Mountain West eliminated its divisional format for football.

== Game results ==
Utah State victories	Wyoming victories	Tie games

No.	Date	Location	Winning team		Losing team	
1	November 23, 1903	Logan, UT	Utah A.C.	46	Wyoming	0
2	November 2, 1912	Logan, UT	Utah A.C.	53	Wyoming	0
3	November 7, 1914	Logan, UT	Utah A.C.	24	Wyoming	3
4	October 27, 1915	Laramie, WY	Wyoming	13	Utah A.C.	7
5	October 21, 1916	Logan, UT	Wyoming	23	Utah A.C.	10
6	October 24, 1917	Logan, UT	Utah A.C.	57	Wyoming	0
7	November 20, 1919	Laramie, WY	Utah A.C.	6	Wyoming	0
8	October 11, 1921	Logan, UT	Utah A.C.	14	Wyoming	3
9	November 11, 1922	Logan, UT	Utah A.C.	26	Wyoming	0
10	November 16, 1923	Laramie, WY	Utah A.C.	20	Wyoming	6
11	November 11, 1924	Logan, UT	Utah A.C.	25	Wyoming	2
12	November 5, 1925	Logan, UT	Utah A.C.	26	Wyoming	13
13	October 23, 1926	Laramie, WY	Tie	6	Tie	6
14	October 22, 1927	Logan, UT	Utah A.C.	42	Wyoming	0
15	October 19, 1928	Laramie, WY	Utah A.C.	24	Wyoming	6
16	October 26, 1929	Laramie, WY	Utah A.C.	12	Wyoming	7
17	October 25, 1930	Logan, UT	Utah A.C.	13	Wyoming	8
18	October 24, 1931	Laramie, WY	Utah A.C.	12	Wyoming	0
19	November 4, 1933	Logan, UT	Utah A.C.	27	Wyoming	0
20	October 20, 1934	Laramie, WY	Utah A.C.	19	Wyoming	0
21	November 9, 1935	Logan, UT	Utah A.C.	18	Wyoming	0
22	October 10, 1936	Laramie, WY	Utah A.C.	25	Wyoming	0
23	October 23, 1937	Logan, UT	Utah A.C.	34	Wyoming	7
24	November 12, 1938	Logan, UT	Wyoming	27	Utah A.C.	12
25	November 18, 1939	Laramie, WY	Utah A.C.	20	Wyoming	13
26	November 21, 1940	Logan, UT	Utah A.C.	16	Wyoming	0
27	November 15, 1941	Laramie, WY	Wyoming	12	Utah A.C.	6
28	November 21, 1942	Logan, UT	Utah A.C.	14	Wyoming	6
29	November 16, 1946	Logan, UT	Utah A.C.	21	Wyoming	7
30	October 18, 1947	Laramie, WY	Wyoming	33	Utah A.C.	19
31	October 30, 1948	Logan, UT	Utah A.C.	45	Wyoming	34
32	October 15, 1949	Laramie, WY	Wyoming	27	Utah A.C.	0
33	October 14, 1950	Logan, UT	Wyoming	40	Utah A.C.	7
34	October 6, 1951	Laramie, WY	Wyoming	37	Utah A.C.	0
35	October 4, 1952	Logan, UT	Wyoming	14	Utah A.C.	0
36	October 3, 1953	Laramie, WY	Wyoming	20	Utah A.C.	13
37	November 6, 1954	Logan, UT	Wyoming	21	Utah A.C.	12

No.	Date	Location	Winning team		Losing team	
38	October 1, 1955	Laramie, WY	Wyoming	21	Utah A.C.	13
39	November 3, 1956	Logan, UT	Wyoming	21	Utah A.C.	0
40	October 5, 1957	Laramie, WY	Tie	19	Tie	19
41	November 8, 1958	Logan, UT	Wyoming	41	Utah State	13
42	October 3, 1959	Laramie, WY	Wyoming	27	Utah State	2
43	November 5, 1960	Logan, UT	#18 Utah State	17	Wyoming	13
44	October 7, 1961	Laramie, WY	Tie	6	Tie	6
45	November 10, 1962	Logan, UT	Utah State	20	Wyoming	6
46	September 28, 1963	Laramie, WY	Wyoming	21	Utah State	14
47	November 7, 1964	Logan, UT	Tie	20	Tie	20
48	October 22, 1966	Laramie, WY	Wyoming	35	Utah State	10
49	September 21, 1968	Laramie, WY	Wyoming	48	Utah State	3
50	September 26, 1970	Laramie, WY	Utah State	42	Wyoming	29
51	November 6, 1971	Logan, UT	Wyoming	31	Utah State	29
52	October 28, 1972	Laramie, WY	Utah State	35	Wyoming	23
53	November 3, 1973	Logan, UT	Utah State	31	Wyoming	20
54	September 14, 1974	Laramie, WY	Utah State	17	Wyoming	7
55	November 1, 1975	Logan, UT	Utah State	27	Wyoming	21
56	September 25, 1976	Laramie, WY	Wyoming	20	Utah State	3
57	November 12, 1977	Logan, UT	Utah State	32	Wyoming	31
58	September 30, 1978	Laramie, WY	Utah State	20	Wyoming	13
59	September 22, 2001	Logan, UT	Wyoming	43	Utah State	42
60	October 11, 2003	Logan, UT	Wyoming	48	Utah State	21
61	September 2, 2006	Laramie, WY	Wyoming	38	Utah State	7
62	September 8, 2007	Laramie, WY	Wyoming	32	Utah State	18
63	October 8, 2011	Logan, UT	Utah State	63	Wyoming	19
64	November 30, 2013	Logan, UT	Utah State	35	Wyoming	7
65	November 8, 2014	Laramie, WY	Utah State	20	Wyoming	3
66	October 30, 2015	Logan, UT	Utah State	58	Wyoming	27
67	November 5, 2016	Laramie, WY	Wyoming	52	Utah State	28
68	October 14, 2017	Logan, UT	Wyoming	28	Utah State	23
69	October 20, 2018	Laramie, WY	Utah State	24	Wyoming	16
70	November 16, 2019	Logan, UT	Utah State	26	Wyoming	21
71	November 20, 2021	Logan, UT	Wyoming	44	Utah State	17
72	October 22, 2022	Laramie, WY	Wyoming	28	Utah State	14
73	October 26, 2024	Laramie, WY	Utah State	27	Wyoming	25
Series: Utah State leads 41–28–4

== See also ==
- List of NCAA college football rivalry games
