= Jim Bradley (American football) =

American football player and coach (1933–2015)

Biographical details
- Born: March 8, 1933; Las Cruces, New Mexico, U.S.
- Died: August 12, 2015 (aged 82); Las Cruces, New Mexico, U.S.

Playing career

Football
- 1951–1954: New Mexico A&M

Coaching career (HC unless noted)

Football
- 1958–1964: Las Cruces HS (NM) (assistant)
- 1965–1972: Mayfield HS (NM)
- 1973–1977: New Mexico State
- 1980–1993: Roswell HS (NM)
- 1994–2005: Mayfield HS (NM)

Baseball
- 1959–1965: Las Cruces HS (NM)

Head coaching record
- Overall: 23–31–1 (college football)

Accomplishments and honors

Championships
- 1 MVC (1976)

James Carlin Bradley (March 8, 1933 – August 12, 2015) was American football coach. He served as the head football coach at New Mexico State University from 1973 to 1977, compiling a record of 23–31–1. Bradley played college football at New Mexico State from 1951 to 1954, when the school was known as New Mexico College of Agriculture and Mechanic Arts. He was the head football coach at Mayfield High School in Las Cruces, New Mexico from 1965 to 1972. Bradley was the head football coach at Roswell High School in Roswell, New Mexico from 1980 to 1993 before he turned to Mayfield High School, where he was again head football coach from 1994 until his retirement in 2005. Bradley was born on March 8, 1933, in Las Cruces. He died in his hometown on August 12, 2015.

== Head coaching record ==
=== College football ===
Year	Team	Overall	Conference	Standing	Bowl/playoffs
New Mexico State Aggies (Missouri Valley Conference) (1973–1977)
1973	New Mexico State	5–6	3–2	T–3rd	
1974	New Mexico State	5–6	2–3	5th	
1975	New Mexico State	5–6	2–2	T–2nd	
1976	New Mexico State	4–6–1	2–1–1	T–1st	
1977	New Mexico State	4–7	3–2	3rd	
New Mexico State:		23–31–1	12–10–1		
Total:		23–31–1			
National championship Conference title Conference division title or championship game berth
