= Julius H. Johnston =

American football coach (1905–1980)

Biographical details
- Born: August 2, 1905
- Died: December 15, 1980 (aged 75)

Coaching career (HC unless noted)

Football
- 1934–1938: Cameron
- 1940–1942: New Mexico State

Basketball
- 1940–1942: New Mexico State

Head coaching record
- Overall: 6–21 (college football); 32–12–4 (junior college)

Accomplishments and honors

Championships
- Football; 1 OJCC (1934)

Julius Harvey "Ju" Johnston (August 2, 1905 – December 15, 1980) was an American football and basketball player and coach. He served as the head football coach at Cameron Junior College—now known as Cameron University—in Lawton, Oklahoma from 1934 to 1938. Johnston was the head football and men's basketball coach at New Mexico College of Agriculture and Mechanic Arts—now known as New Mexico State University—from 1940 to 1942.

== Head coaching record ==
=== College football ===
Year	Team	Overall	Conference	Standing	Bowl/playoffs
New Mexico A&M Aggies (Border Conference) (1940–1942)
1940	New Mexico A&M	3–6	1–4	5th	
1941	New Mexico A&M	2–7	0–6	9th	
1942	New Mexico A&M	1–8	0–6	9th	
New Mexico A&M:		6–21	1–16		
Total:		6–21			

=== Junior college football ===
Year	Team	Overall	Conference	Standing	Bowl/playoffs
Cameron Aggies (Oklahoma Junior College Conference) (1934–1938)
1934	Cameron	7–2	4–1	T–1st	
1935	Cameron	6–4	2–2	4th	
1936	Cameron	6–3–1	3–1	2nd	
1937	Cameron	5–2–3	2–1–1	4th	
1938	Cameron	8–1	4–1	2nd	
Cameron:		32–12–4	15–6–1		
Total:		32–12–4			
National championship Conference title Conference division title or championship game berth
