= Harbor Bowl =

College football game in California, US

The Harbor Bowl was an annual college football bowl game held in San Diego, California, from 1947 to 1949. The game was played at Balboa Stadium.

== Game results ==
Date	Winner		Loser		Location
January 1, 1947	Montana State	13	New Mexico	13	San Diego
January 1, 1948	Hardin–Simmons	53	San Diego State	0	San Diego
January 1, 1949	Villanova	27	Nevada	7	San Diego

== Game summaries ==
=== 1947 Harbor Bowl ===
	1	2	3	4	Total
New Mexico	6	0	0	7	13
Montana State	0	13	0	0	13

The inaugural Harbor Bowl was played on January 1, 1948 between the Montana State Bobcats and the New Mexico Lobos. The game was played in San Diego. MSU ended the 1st quarter trailing 6–0, but scored 13 in the 2nd to lead 13–6 at halftime. The 3rd quarter produced no score, and UNM scored the tying touchdown on a 2-yard run in the 4th. Huburt Hackett's 35 yard field goal fell short as time expired, keeping the game tied.

=== 1948 Harbor Bowl ===
	1	2	3	4	Total
Hardin–Simmons	14	13	14	12	53
San Diego State	0	0	0	0	0

The 1948 Harbor Bowl had the Hardin–Simmons Cowboys play against the San Diego State Aztecs. The scoring opened in the 1st when the Cowboys scored two touchdowns to lead 14–0. The Cowboys scored 13 more and pitched another shutout quarter in the 2nd to lead 27–0 at halftime. They did not let up in the 3rd, finding the end zone twice more to lead 41–0. Two more Cowboy touchdowns in the fourth (no PAT on either) set the final score at 53–0. This game marked the first Harbor Bowl shutout. Hardin–Simmons dominated the rushing game, going for 470 yards on the ground to SDSU's 66. This put Hardin–Simmons at 545 total yards.

=== 1949 Harbor Bowl ===
	1	2	3	4	Total
Villanova	13	0	14	0	27
Nevada	0	0	7	0	7

The third and last Harbor Bowl was played in 1949 in San Diego. Villanova took on Nevada before a crowd of 20,000. 'Nova took a 13–0 lead after two first quarter touchdowns (one PAT was no good) and held that same score into halftime. In the 3rd quarter, 'Nova found the end zone twice more and Nevada scored for the first time to make the score 27–7. The 4th quarter proved scoreless, and the Wildcats won 27–7.

== See also ==
- List of college bowl games
