= Frank Brickey =

American sports coach (1912–1994)

Biographical details
- Born: July 5, 1912; Ironton, Ohio, U.S.
- Died: September 27, 1994 (aged 82); Salt Lake City, Utah, U.S.

Playing career

Football
- 1930–1932: Arizona State–Flagstaff

Coaching career (HC unless noted)

Football
- 1940–1941: Arizona State–Flagstaff (assistant)
- 1943–1946: Arizona State–Flagstaff

Basketball
- ?–1940: Duncan HS (AZ)
- 1940–1947: Arizona State–Flagstaff

Head coaching record
- Overall: 10–8–2 (college football); 63–48 (college basketball)

Accomplishments and honors

Championships
- Basketball; 3 Arizona State boy's high school (1938–1940)

Frank Mayo Brickey (July 5, 1912 – September 27, 1994) was an American football and basketball coach. He served as the head football coach at Arizona State Teachers College at Flagstaff—now known as Northern Arizona University—from 1943 to 1946. Brickey was the head basketball coach at the school from 1940 to 1947.

== Playing career ==
Brickey played high school football at Grossmont High School in San Diego, California and was a member of the 1927 team that won the Class B Southern California State Football Championship. In college, he played for Arizona State Teachers College in Flagstaff, Arizona, lettering for three years and being chosen all conference. Brickey was also selected to play on the Arizona All-Star Team which played an exhibition match against the 1934 NFL Championship Chicago Bears. The Arizona team lost that match, 46–6.

== Coaching career ==
Brickey was the boys' basketball coach at Duncan High School in Duncan, Arizona and notably lead that school to three consecutive state championships in 1938, 1939, and 1940. After his stint as a high school coach and educator, Brickey returned to Arizona State Teachers College where he was the head coach of both the men's football and basketball teams from 1943 to 1946. Brickey then moved to Salt Lake City and served as an assistant coach at The University of Utah from 1947 to 1956.

=== 1940 Arizona State boys' high school basketball championship ===
In the era before state high school divisions were defined by student enrollment, Duncan High School won three consecutive state titles in men's basketball. The 1940 title is significant due to the two teams that contended for it. Student enrollment at Tucson High School that year was around 3,500. The population of the entire town of Duncan, Arizona was 887. The Duncan team won, 31–29. Among the players on that team were Gene O'Dell, Joe Francese, Jack Lunt, Preston Aker, and Fred Arnet.

== Head coaching record ==
=== College football ===
Year	Team	Overall	Conference	Standing	Bowl/playoffs
Arizona State Flagstaff–Lumberjacks (Border Conference) (1943–1946)
1943	Arizona State–Flagstaff	1–1	0–0	NA	
1944	Arizona State–Flagstaff	2–2	0–0	NA	
1945	Arizona State–Flagstaff	2–3	0–0	NA	
1946	Arizona State–Flagstaff	5–2–2	1–2–1	6th	
Arizona State–Flagstaff:		10–8–2	1–2–1		
Total:		10–8–2			
