= Gus Miller (coach) =

American football and basketball coach (1900–1992)

Biographical details
- Born: August 3, 1900; Pine Grove, Texas, U.S.
- Died: February 16, 1992 (aged 91); Denton, Texas, U.S.

Playing career

Football
- 1919: West Texas State

Coaching career (HC unless noted)

Football
- 1923–1926: Slaton HS (TX)
- 1927–1936: Trinidad HS (CO)
- 1937–1941: Texas Wesleyan
- 1942–1946: West Texas State

Basketball
- 1937–1942: Texas Wesleyan
- 1942–1957: West Texas State

Administrative career (AD unless noted)
- 1946–1957: West Texas State

Head coaching record
- Overall: 41–32–3 (college football); 283–154 (college basketball)
- Tournaments: Basketball; 4–3 (NAIA); 0–1 (NCAA)

Accomplishments and honors

Championships
- Football; 1 Texas Conference (1940) Basketball; 4 Texas Conference (1938, 1940–1942); 3 Border (1943, 1952, 1955)

William Augustus Miller (August 3, 1900 – February 16, 1992) was an American football and basketball coach and college athletics administrator. He served as the head football coach at Texas Wesleyan College—now known as Texas Wesleyan University—in Fort Worth, Texas from 1937 to 1941 and West Texas State Teachers College—now known as West Texas A&M University—in Canyon, Texas–from 1942 to 1946, compiling a career college football coaching record of 41–32–3. Miller was also the head basketball coach at Texas Wesleyan from 1947 to 1942 and West Texas State from 1942 to 1957, tallying a career college basketball coaching mark of 283–154. His basketball teams won three Border Conference championships and made an appearance in the 1955 NCAA basketball tournament.

Miller coached at Trinidad High School in Trinidad, Colorado for 10 years before he was hired at Texas Wesleyan in 1937.

Miller was born in Pine Grove, Texas. He received a bachelor's degree from West Texas State and a master's degree from Texas Tech University. He died on February 16, 1992, at a hospital in Denton, Texas.

== Head coaching record ==
=== College football ===
Year	Team	Overall	Conference	Standing	Bowl/playoffs
Texas Wesleyan Rams (Texas Conference) (1937–1941)
1937	Texas Wesleyan	6–3	3–2	4th	
1938	Texas Wesleyan	3–4–1	2–3	6th	
1939	Texas Wesleyan	4–5–2	2–2–1	T–5th	
1940	Texas Wesleyan	7–2	5–1	T–1st	
1941	Texas Wesleyan	5–3	5–1	T–2nd	
Texas Wesleyan:		25–17–3	17–9–1		
West Texas State Buffaloes (Border Conference) (1942–1946)
1942	West Texas State	7–2	5–2	3rd	
1943	No team—World War II				
1944	West Texas State	4–3	1–1	2nd	
1945	West Texas State	2–6	0–2	3rd	
1946	West Texas State	3–4 (Note: Miller resigned after the first seven games of the 1946 season. Windy Nicklaus replaced Miller as head coach and led West Texas State to a record of 2–1 over the final three games of the season. The team finished 5–5 overall and 4–5 in Border Conference play, placing fifth.)	2–3		
West Texas State:		16–15	8–8		
Total:		41–32–3			

=== College basketball ===
Record table
Season	Team	Overall	Conference	Standing	Postseason
Texas Wesleyan Rams (Texas Conference) (1937–1941)
1937–38	Texas Wesleyan	13–1	12–0	1st	
1938–39	Texas Wesleyan	19–7	9–2	3rd	
1939–40	Texas Wesleyan	20–3	12–0	1st	NAIA Elite Eight
1940–41	Texas Wesleyan	21–2	12–0	1st	NAIA Elite Eight
1941–42	Texas Wesleyan	13–4	12–0	1st	NAIA First Round
Texas Wesleyan:		86–17 (.835)	57–2 (.966)		
West Texas State Buffaloes (Border Conference) (1942–1957)
1942–43	West Texas State	16–7	12–0	1st	
1943–44	No team—World War II				
1944–45	West Texas State	16–10	5–3		
1945–46	West Texas State	19–8	9–3		
1946–47	West Texas State	13–11	8–8		
1947–48	West Texas State	11–13	7–9		
1948–49	West Texas State	16–7	7–7		
1949–50	West Texas State	19–10	9–5		
1950–51	West Texas State	14–12	9–7		
1951–52	West Texas State	19–8	12–2	1st	
1952–53	West Texas State	8–13	5–9		
1953–54	West Texas State	13–7	9–3		
1954–55	West Texas State	15–7	9–3	1st	NCAA first round
1955–56	West Texas State	12–10	6–6		
1956–57	West Texas State	6–14	3–7		
West Texas A&M:		197–137 (.590)	110–72 (.604)		
Total:		283–154 (.648)			
National champion Postseason invitational champion Conference regular season champion Conference regular season and conference tournament champion Division regular season champion Division regular season and conference tournament champion Conference tournament champion
