= Warren B. Woodson =

American football coach (1903–1998)

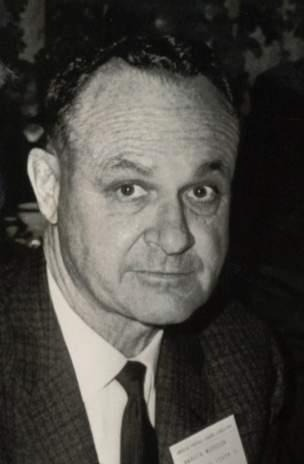
- Woodson in 1961

Biographical details
- Born: February 24, 1903; Fort Worth, Texas, U.S.
- Died: February 22, 1998 (aged 94); Dallas, Texas, U.S.

Coaching career (HC unless noted)

Football
- 1927–1934: Texarkana
- 1935–1940: Arkansas State Teachers
- 1941–1951: Hardin–Simmons
- 1952–1956: Arizona
- 1958–1967: New Mexico A&M / State
- 1972–1973: Trinity (TX)

Basketball
- 1935–1941: Arkansas State Teachers
- 1945–1946: Hardin–Simmons

Baseball
- 1936: Arkansas State Teachers

Administrative career (AD unless noted)
- 1941–1952: Hardin–Simmons
- 1958–1967: New Mexico A&M / State
- 1968–1973: Trinity (TX)

Head coaching record
- Overall: 203–94–14 (college football); 116–50 (college basketball)
- Bowls: 6–1–1

Accomplishments and honors

Championships
- Football; 4 AIC (1936–1938, 1940); 3 Border (1942, 1946, 1960)
- College Football Hall of Fame; Inducted in 1989 (profile)

Warren Brooks Woodson (February 24, 1903 – February 22, 1998) was an American football, basketball, and baseball coach and college athletics administrator. He served as the head football coach at Arkansas State Teachers College, now the University of Central Arkansas, (1935–1940), Hardin–Simmons University (1941–1951), the University of Arizona (1952–1956), New Mexico State University (1958–1967), and Trinity University in San Antonio, Texas (1972–1973), compiling a career college football record of 203–94–14 in 31 seasons. He was also the head basketball coach at Arkansas State Teachers from 1935 to 1941 and at Hardin–Simmons in 1945–46, tallying a career college basketball mark of 116–50. Woodson won an additional 52 football games at junior college level and 18 high school football games. He was inducted to the College Football Hall of Fame in 1989.

== Education and coaching career ==
Woodson received a degree from Baylor University in 1924, majoring in Bible and history, and a degree from Springfield College in 1926, majoring in physical education. He coached four sports at Texarkana Junior College from 1927 to 1934 and, in three of the same years also coached three sports at a nearby high school.

He then moved on to Arkansas State Teachers College (now University of Central Arkansas) in Conway from 1935 to 1940. In his second year, his team had a perfect 8–0 season. Won 2000 Elijah Pitts Award (named after the Conway, Arkansas, native and Green Bay Packer legend) for Conway athletic lifetime achievement.

Woodson accepted the head coaching job at Hardin–Simmons University in 1941. During World War II, Woodson served for three years as a lieutenant commander in the United States Navy. The Hardin-Simmons football program was canceled from 1943 to 1945. After Woodson returned, his 1946 team went unbeaten with an 11–0 record. His 1948 team was in three bowls: the Grape Bowl on December 4, a 35–35 tie with College of the Pacific; the Shrine Bowl December 18, a 40–12 victory over Ouachita Baptist; and Camellia Bowl December 30, a 49–12 victory over Wichita.

Woodson coached at the University of Arizona from 1952 to 1956 and at New Mexico State University from 1958 to 1967. His 1960 team went 11–0. He was head coach at Trinity University in San Antonio, Texas from 1972 to 1973 and later was consultant at New Mexico Highlands.

Woodson coached players who won the national rushing title nine times:

- Rudolph Mobley, Hardin–Simmons (1942, 1946)
- Wilton Davis, Hardin–Simmons (1947)
- Art Luppino, Arizona (1954, 1955)
- Pervis Atkins, New Mexico State (1959)
- Bob Gaiters, New Mexico (State 1960)
- Jim Pilot, New Mexico State (1961, 1962)

== Death ==
Woodson died of colon cancer on February 22, 1998, at his home in Dallas, Texas.

== Head coaching record ==
=== College football ===
Year	Team	Overall	Conference	Standing	Bowl/playoffs	Coaches^{#}	AP^{°}
Arkansas State Teachers Bears (Arkansas Intercollegiate Conference) (1935–1940)
1935	Arkansas State Teachers	4–3					
1936	Arkansas State Teachers	8–0		1st			
1937	Arkansas State Teachers	8–1		1st	L Charity		
1938	Arkansas State Teachers	7–1		1st			
1939	Arkansas State Teachers	5–2–2					
1940	Arkansas State Teachers	8–1–1		1st			
Arkansas State Teachers:		40–8–3					
Hardin–Simmons Cowboys (Border Conference) (1941–1951)
1941	Hardin–Simmons	7–3–1	3–1	4th			
1942	Hardin–Simmons	9–0–1 (Note: Woodson went into service in the United States Navy at the end of the regular season. Clark Jarnagin served as interim head coach for the 1943 Sun Bowl.)	4–0–1	T–1st	Sun		
1943	No team—World War II						
1944	No team—World War II						
1945	No team—World War II						
1946	Hardin–Simmons	11–0	6–0	1st	W Alamo		
1947	Hardin–Simmons	8–3	5–1	2nd	W Harbor		
1948	Hardin–Simmons	6–2–3	3–2–1	5th	T Grape, W Shrine, W Camellia		
1949	Hardin–Simmons	6–4–1	4–2	T–3rd			
1950	Hardin–Simmons	5–5	3–3	5th			
1951	Hardin–Simmons	6–6	4–1	T–2nd			
Hardin–Simmons:		57–23–6	32–10–2				
Arizona Wildcats (Border Conference) (1952–1956)
1952	Arizona	6–4	3–2	3rd			
1953	Arizona	4–5–1	3–2	4th			
1954	Arizona	7–3	3–2	4th			
1955	Arizona	5–4–1	1–2–1	5th			
1956	Arizona	4–6	1–2	4th			
Arizona:		26–22–2	11–10–1				
New Mexico A&M / New Mexico State Aggies (Border Conference) (1958–1961)
1958	New Mexico A&M	4–6	1–3	4th			
1959	New Mexico A&M	8–3	2–2	T–3rd	W Sun		
1960	New Mexico State	11–0	4–0	1st	W Sun	19	17
1961	New Mexico State	5–4–1	2–1	3rd			
New Mexico State Aggies (Independent) (1962–1967)
1962	New Mexico State	4–6					
1963	New Mexico State	3–6–1					
1964	New Mexico State	6–4					
1965	New Mexico State	8–2					
1966	New Mexico State	7–3					
1967	New Mexico State	7–2–1					
New Mexico State:		63–36–3	9–6				
Trinity Tigers (NCAA College Division / Division II independent) (1972–1973)
1972	Trinity	8–2					
1973	Trinity	8–3					
Trinity:		16–5					
Total:		203–94–14					
National championship Conference title Conference division title or championship game berth
^{#}Rankings from final Coaches Poll.; ^{°}Rankings from final AP Poll.

== See also ==
- List of college football career coaching wins leaders
