= 1946 Texas Tech Red Raiders football team =

American college football season

1946 Texas Tech Red Raiders football
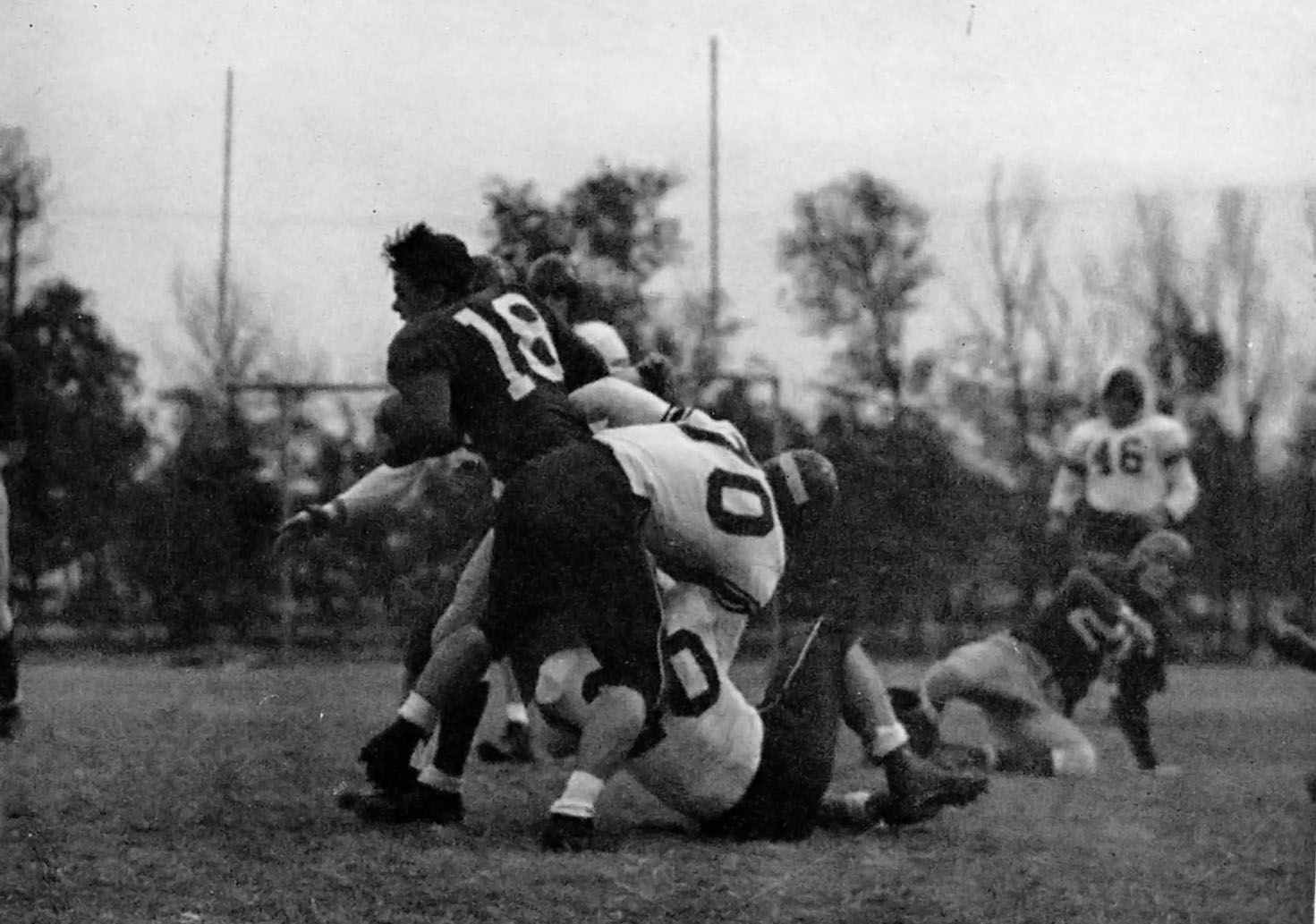
- Texas Tech in action against New Mexico
- Conference: Border Conference
- Record: 8–3 (3–1 Border)
- Head coach: Dell Morgan (6th season)
- Offensive scheme: Single-wing
- Base defense: 6–2
- Home stadium: Tech Field

1946 Border Conference football standings
	Conf.					Overall
Team	W		L		T	W		L		T
Hardin–Simmons $	6	–	0	–	0	11	–	0	–	0
Texas Tech	3	–	1	–	0	8	–	3	–	0
New Mexico	4	–	2	–	1	5	–	5	–	2
Arizona	2	–	2	–	1	4	–	4	–	2
West Texas State	3	–	4	–	0	5	–	5	–	0
Arizona State–Flagstaff	1	–	2	–	1	5	–	2	–	2
Texas Mines	2	–	4	–	0	3	–	6	–	0
Arizona State	1	–	4	–	1	2	–	7	–	2
New Mexico A&M	1	–	4	–	0	4	–	5	–	0
$ – Conference champion

The 1946 Texas Tech Red Raiders football team was an American football team that represented Texas Tech University in the Border Conference during the 1946 college football season. In their sixth season under head coach Dell Morgan, the Red Raiders compiled an 8–3 record (3–1 against Border Conference opponents), finished in second place in the conference, and outscored all opponents by a total of 148 to 116.

Texas Tech was ranked at No. 58 in the final Litkenhous Difference by Score System rankings for 1946.

The team played home games at Tech Field in Lubbock, Texas.

== Schedule ==
Date	Opponent	Site	Result	Attendance	Source
September 21	West Texas State	Tech Field; Lubbock, TX	W 26–14	10,000	
September 28	vs. Texas A&M*	Alamo Stadium; San Antonio, TX (rivalry)	W 6–0	23,000	
October 5	at SMU*	Cotton Bowl; Dallas, TX	W 7–0	30,000	
October 12	at Tulsa*	Skelly Field; Tulsa, OK	L 6–21	15,000	
October 19	Baylor*^{†}	Tech Field; Lubbock, TX (rivalry)	W 13–6	13,000	
October 26	Denver*	Tech Field; Lubbock, TX	W 21–6	11,000	
November 2	at No. 8 Rice*	Rice Field; Houston, TX	L 6–41	25,000	
November 9	at New Mexico	Lobo Stadium; Albuquerque, NM	W 27–0	8,000	
November 16	Oklahoma A&M*	Tech Field; Lubbock, TX	W 14–7	13,000	
November 23	at Arizona	Arizona Stadium; Tucson, AZ	W 16–0	9,000	
November 30	at Hardin–Simmons	Fair Park Stadium; Abilene, TX	L 6–21	13,000	
*Non-conference game; ^{†}Homecoming; Rankings from AP Poll released prior to the game

== Game summaries ==
=== West Texas State ===
	1	2	3	4	Total
Buffaloes	0	0	0	14	14
Red Raiders	6	7	6	7	26

=== Vs. Texas A&M ===
	1	2	3	4	Total
Aggies	0	0	0	0	0
Red Raiders	0	0	0	6	6

=== At SMU ===
	1	2	3	4	Total
Red Raiders	0	0	0	7	7
Mustangs	0	0	0	0	0

=== At Tulsa ===
	1	2	3	4	Total
Red Raiders	6	0	0	0	6
Golden Hurricane	0	7	7	7	21

=== Baylor ===
	1	2	3	4	Total
Bears	6	0	0	0	6
Red Raiders	0	0	13	0	13

=== Denver ===
	1	2	3	4	Total
Pioneers	0	0	0	6	6
Red Raiders	7	0	7	7	21

=== At No. 8 Rice ===
	1	2	3	4	Total
Red Raiders	0	6	0	0	6
No. 8 Owls	14	7	0	20	41

=== At New Mexico ===
	1	2	3	4	Total
Red Raiders	0	7	0	20	27
Lobos	0	0	0	0	0

=== Oklahoma A&M ===
	1	2	3	4	Total
Cowboys	0	0	0	7	7
Red Raiders	7	0	7	0	14

=== At Arizona ===
	1	2	3	4	Total
Red Raiders	2	7	7	0	16
Wildcats	0	0	0	0	0

=== At Hardin–Simmons ===
	1	2	3	4	Total
Red Raiders	0	0	0	6	6
Cowboys	14	7	0	0	21

== After the season ==
The 1947 NFL Draft was held on December 16, 1946. The following Red Raiders were selected.

Round	Pick	Player	Position	NFL Club
18	157	Roland Nabors	Linebacker	Boston Yanks
26	243	Gene Standefer	Back	Los Angeles Rams
28	260	Joe Smith	End	Chicago Cardinals
30	281	Bernie Winkler	Tackle	Philadelphia Eagles
