= Willis Barnes =

American sports coach (1900–1976)

Biographical details
- Born: October 22, 1900
- Died: March 22, 1976 (aged 75)

Coaching career (HC unless noted)

Football
- 1931: Arizona State (line)
- 1937–1941: New Mexico (assistant)
- 1942–1946: New Mexico
- 1947: New Mexico (assistant)
- 1950–1951: New Mexico (assistant)
- 1954–1955: New Mexico (assistant)

Basketball
- 1941–1943: New Mexico

Head coaching record
- Overall: 19–20–5 (football); 12–30 (basketball)
- Bowls: 1–1–1

Willis Lee Barnes (October 22, 1900 – March 22, 1976) was an American football, basketball, track and field, and boxing coach. He served as the head football coach at the University of New Mexico from 1942 to 1946, compiling a record of 45–35–10. Barnes was also the head basketball coach at New Mexico from 1941 to 1943, tallying a mark of 12–30. Barnes came to the University of New Mexico in 1937 as an assistant football coach.

== Head coaching record ==
=== Football ===
Year	Team	Overall	Conference	Standing	Bowl/playoffs
New Mexico Lobos (Border Conference) (1942–1946)
1942	New Mexico	4–5–2	3–4	6th	
1943	New Mexico	3–2	NA	NA	L Sun
1944	New Mexico	1–7	0–2	NA	
1945	New Mexico	6–1–1	1–0–1	NA	W Sun
1946	New Mexico	5–5–2	4–2–1	3rd	T Harbor
New Mexico:		19–20–5	8–8–2		
Total:		19–20–5			
