= 1946 Hardin–Simmons Cowboys football team =

American college football season

1946 Hardin–Simmons Cowboys football

Border champion Alamo Bowl champion

Alamo Bowl, W 20–0 vs. Denver
- Conference: Border Conference
- Record: 11–0 (6–0 Border)
- Head coach: Warren B. Woodson (3rd season)
- Offensive scheme: T formation
- Home stadium: Fair Park Stadium

1946 Border Conference football standings
	Conf.					Overall
Team	W		L		T	W		L		T
Hardin–Simmons $	6	–	0	–	0	11	–	0	–	0
Texas Tech	3	–	1	–	0	8	–	3	–	0
New Mexico	4	–	2	–	1	5	–	5	–	2
Arizona	2	–	2	–	1	4	–	4	–	2
West Texas State	3	–	4	–	0	5	–	5	–	0
Arizona State–Flagstaff	1	–	2	–	1	5	–	2	–	2
Texas Mines	2	–	4	–	0	3	–	6	–	0
Arizona State	1	–	4	–	1	2	–	7	–	2
New Mexico A&M	1	–	4	–	0	4	–	5	–	0
$ – Conference champion

The 1946 Hardin–Simmons Cowboys football team was an American football team that represented Hardin–Simmons University in the Border Conference during the 1946 college football season. The 1946 season marked Hardin–Simmons' return to football after a three-year hiatus during World War II. In its third season under head coach Warren B. Woodson, the Cowboys compiled a perfect 11–0 record, outscored opponents by a total of 332 to 48, won the Border Conference championship, and defeated Denver in the 1947 Alamo Bowl.

The Cowboys ranked second nationally in rushing offense with an average of 290.6 rushing yards per game during the regular season. They ranked sixth nationally in total offense with an average of 359.4 yards per game. They also ranked seventh nationally in total defense, giving up only 167.3 yards per game during the regular season.

Halfback Rudy Mobley led the nation with 1,262 rushing yards during the regular season. He added 142 rushing yards and two touchdowns in the Alamo Bowl, bringing his 11-game season total to 1,404 rushing yards.

Hardin–Simmons was ranked at No. 56 in the final Litkenhous Difference by Score System rankings for 1946.

== Schedule ==
Date	Time	Opponent	Site	Result	Attendance	Source
September 21	8:00 p.m.	vs. McMurry*	Fair Park Stadium; Abilene, TX	W 31–0	6,500	
September 28		Kansas State*	Fair Park Stadium; Abilene, TX	W 21–7		
October 5		San Jose State*	Fair Park Stadium; Abilene, TX	W 34–7	5,000	
October 18		at New Mexico	Zimmerman Field; Albuquerque, NM	W 49–0		
October 26	8:00 p.m.	vs. Arizona State	Mustang Bowl; Sweetwater, TX	W 46–6		
November 2		at Arizona	Varsity Stadium; Tucson, AZ	W 19–8	11,000	
November 8		West Texas State	Fair Park Stadium; Abilene, TX	W 28–7		
November 16		at Texas Mines	Kidd Field; El Paso, TX	W 20–7	8,000	
November 22		Howard Payne*^{†}	Fair Park Stadium; Abilene, TX	W 33–0	4,000	
November 30		Texas Tech	Fair Park Stadium; Abilene, TX	W 21–6	13,000	
January 4, 1947		vs. Denver*	Alamo Stadium; San Antonio, TX (Alamo Bowl)	W 20–0	3,730	
*Non-conference game; ^{†}Homecoming; All times are in Central time

== After the season ==
The 1947 NFL draft was held on December 16, 1946. The following Cowboys were selected.

Round	Pick	Player	Position	NFL club
14	121	Al Johnson	Quarterback	Philadelphia Eagles
15	132	Joe Cook	Back	Philadelphia Eagles
