= 1944 West Texas State Buffaloes football team =

American college football season

1944 West Texas State Buffaloes football
- Conference: Border Conference
- Record: 4–3 (1–1 Border)
- Head coach: Gus Miller (2nd season)
- Home stadium: Buffalo Stadium

1944 Border Conference football standings
	Conf.					Overall
Team	W		L		T	W		L		T
Texas Tech	2	–	0	–	0	4	–	7	–	0
West Texas State	1	–	1	–	0	4	–	3	–	0
New Mexico	0	–	2	–	0	1	–	7	–	0
Arizona State–Flagstaff	0	–	0	–	0	2	–	2	–	0
$ – Conference champion

The 1944 West Texas State Buffaloes football team was an American football team that represented West Texas State College (now known as West Texas A&M University) in the Border Conference during the 1944 college football season. In their second season under head coach Gus Miller, the team compiled a 4–3 record (1–1 against conference opponents) and finsished second in the Border. The team played its home games at Buffalo Stadium in Canyon, Texas.

== Schedule ==
Date	Time	Opponent	Site	Result	Attendance	Source
September 23		at Oklahoma A&M*	Lewis Field; Stillwater, OK	L 6–41		
October 7		at New Mexico	Hilltop Stadium; Albuquerque, NM	W 19–12		
October 14	8:00 p.m.	Amarillo Army Air Field*	Buffalo Stadium; Canyon, TX	L 7–38		
October 27		vs. Texas Tech	Butler Field; Amarillo, TX	L 6–35		
November 3	8:00 p.m.	Lubbock Army Air Field*	Buffalo Stadium; Canyon, TX	W 14–12		
November 17		at South Plains Army Air Field*	Tech Field; Lubbock, TX	W 19–14	150	
November 23		at Abilene Christian*	Cowboy Field; Abilene, TX	W 41–6		
*Non-conference game; All times are in Central time
