= 1946 Colorado A&M Aggies football team =

American college football season

1946 Colorado A&M Aggies football
- Conference: Mountain States Conference
- Record: 2–7 (1–5 MSC)
- Head coach: Julius Wagner (3rd season; first 5 games); Harry W. Hughes (interim, 32nd season; final 4 games)
- Home stadium: Colorado Field

1946 Mountain States Conference football standings
	Conf.					Overall
Team	W		L		T	W		L		T
Utah State $	4	–	1	–	1	7	–	2	–	1
Denver $	4	–	1	–	1	5	–	5	–	1
Utah	4	–	2	–	0	8	–	3	–	0
Colorado	3	–	2	–	1	5	–	4	–	1
BYU	3	–	2	–	1	5	–	4	–	1
Colorado A&M	1	–	5	–	0	2	–	7	–	0
Wyoming	0	–	6	–	0	1	–	8	–	1
$ – Conference champion

The 1946 Colorado A&M Aggies football team represented Colorado State College of Agriculture and Mechanic Arts in the Mountain States Conference (MSC) during the 1946 college football season. The Aggies compiled a 2–7 record (1–5 against MSC opponents), finished sixth in the MSC, and were outscored by a total of 184 to 50.

Julius Wagner, who was in his third season as the team's head coached, resigned after five games. He was replaced by Harry W. Hughes who had been head coach from 1911 to 1941 and served as interim head coach for the final four games of the 1946 season.

== Schedule ==
Date	Opponent	Site	Result	Attendance	Source
September 21	at Fort Warren*	Cheyenne, WY	W 25–0		
September 27	at Montana*	Dornblaser Field; Missoula, MT	L 0–26		
October 5	at Wyoming	Corbett Field; Laramie, WY (rivalry)	W 7–0	4,700	
October 11	at Denver	DU Stadium; Denver, CO	L 0–33	15,000	
October 19	at Utah State	Aggie Stadium; Logan, UT	L 0–48	8,000	
October 26	Colorado College*	Colorado Field; Fort Collins, CO	L 12–25	5,000	
November 9	Utah^{†}	Colorado Field; Fort Collins, CO	L 0–13	1,750	
November 16	BYU	Colorado Field; Fort Collins, CO	L 6–20	1,500	
November 28	at Colorado	Folsom Field; Boulder, CO (rivalry)	L 0–18	9,000	
*Non-conference game; ^{†}Homecoming
