= 1946 Tulsa Golden Hurricane football team =

American college football season

1946 Tulsa Golden Hurricane football

MVC champion
- Conference: Missouri Valley Conference

Ranking
- AP: No. 17
- Record: 9–1 (3–0 MVC)
- Head coach: Buddy Brothers (1st season)
- Home stadium: Skelly Field

1946 Missouri Valley Conference football standings
	Conf.					Overall
Team	W		L		T	W		L		T
No. 17 Tulsa $	3	–	0	–	0	9	–	1	–	0
Wichita	2	–	1	–	0	5	–	5	–	0
Saint Louis	1	–	1	–	0	4	–	6	–	0
Oklahoma A&M	1	–	1	–	0	3	–	7	–	1
Drake	0	–	4	–	0	2	–	6	–	1
$ – Conference champion; Rankings from AP Poll

The 1946 Tulsa Golden Hurricane football team was an American football team that represented the University of Tulsa in the Missouri Valley Conference (MVC) during the 1946 college football season. In their first year under head coach Buddy Brothers, the Golden Hurricane compiled a 9–1 record (3–0 against MVC opponents), won the MVC championship, and was ranked No. 17 in the final AP Poll (No. 23 in the final Litkenhous Difference by Score System rankings). Tulsa defeated Texas Tech (21–6), Kansas (56–0), Cincinnati (20–0), Oklahoma State (20–18), Baylor (17–0), and No. 10-ranked Arkansas (14–13), and lost only to Detroit (14–20).

== Schedule ==
Date	Opponent	Rank	Site	Result	Attendance	Source
September 21	at Wichita		Cessna Stadium; Wichita, KS	W 33–13	9,000	
September 28	New Mexico A&M*		Skelly Field; Tulsa, OK	W 52–0	12,300	
October 5	at Drake		Drake Stadium; Des Moines, IA	W 48–13	13,000	
October 12	Texas Tech*		Skelly Field; Tulsa, OK	W 21–6	15,000	
October 18	at Detroit	No. 20	University of Detroit Stadium; Detroit, MI	L 14–20	20,200	
October 26	Kansas*		Skelly Field; Tulsa, OK	W 56–0	13,000	
November 2	Cincinnati*		Skelly Field; Tulsa, OK	W 20–0	10,000	
November 9	Oklahoma A&M		Skelly Field; Tulsa, OK (rivalry)	W 20–18	17,000	
November 16	Baylor*^{†}		Skelly Field; Tulsa, OK	W 17–0	12,000	
November 28	No. 10 Arkansas*		Skelly Field; Tulsa, OK	W 14–13	19,123	
*Non-conference game; ^{†}Homecoming; Rankings from AP Poll released prior to the game

== Rankings ==
Ranking movements Legend: ██ Increase in ranking ██ Decrease in ranking — = Not ranked т = Tied with team above or below
	Week								
Poll	1	2	3	4	5	6	7	8	Final
AP	—	20т	—	—	—	—	19т	—	17

== 1947 NFL draft ==
The 1947 NFL draft was held on December 16, 1946. The following Golden Hurricane players were selected.

Round	Pick	Player	Position	NFL club
5	34	Nelson Greene	Tackle	New York Giants
12	102	Jerry D'Arcy	Center	Philadelphia Eagles
12	104	Hardy Brown	Linebacker	New York Giants
13	112	Harden Cooper	Tackle	Chicago Cardinals
23	212	Joe Haynes	Center	Philadelphia Eagles
