= 1947 Raisin Bowl =

Utah State Aggies	San Jose State Spartans
(7–1–1)	(8–1)
0	20
Head coach: Dick Romney	Head coach: Wilbur V. Hubbard
	1	2	3	4	Total
Utah State	0	0	0	0	0
San Jose State	0	7	13	0	20
- Date: January 1, 1947
- Season: 1946
- Stadium: Ratcliffe Stadium
- Location: Fresno, California

The 1947 Raisin Bowl was a college football postseason bowl game that featured the Utah State Aggies and the San Jose State Spartans.

== Background ==
The Aggies (their school was then known as Utah Agricultural) were co-champions of the Mountain States Conference with Denver, though they would be the one invited to play San Jose State in the Raisin Bowl in Fresno. The Spartans were an independent team, though they had eight victories under first year head coach Wilbur V. Hubbard. This was the first bowl game for either team.

== Game summary ==
- San Jose State - Jackson 10 yd pass from Schemmel
- San Jose State - Jackson 11 yd pass from Schemmel
- San Jose State - Rhyne 2 yd run

Substitute halfback Bill Schembel threw a pass to quarterback Bill Jackson for a touchdown to open the scoring for the Spartans. Jackson returned the favor in the second half with a touchdown pass to Schembel. Bill Rhyne scored on a one-yard touchdown run to make it 20-0. The Aggies had the ball at the Spartan one in the first and fourth quarter, but they did not score, a consequence of having only 126 yards the entire game.

== Aftermath ==
The Aggies did not reach a bowl game again until 1960. The Spartans returned to the Raisin Bowl two years later.

== Statistics ==
Statistics	San Jose State	Utah State
First downs	16	7
Rushing yards	177	75
Passing yards	110	49
Total yards	287	126
Fumbles–lost	1–1	3–1
Penalties–yards	5–65	2–10
Punts–average	5–39.0	6–44.0
