= 1944 New Mexico Lobos football team =

American college football season

1944 New Mexico Lobos football
- Conference: Border Conference
- Record: 1–7 (0–2 Border)
- Head coach: Willis Barnes (3rd season)
- Home stadium: Hilltop Stadium

1944 Border Conference football standings
| | Conf. | | | | | Overall |
| Team | W | | L | | T | W | | L | | T |
|---|---|---|---|---|---|---|---|---|---|---|
| Texas Tech | 2 | – | 0 | – | 0 | 4 | – | 7 | – | 0 |
| West Texas State | 1 | – | 1 | – | 0 | 4 | – | 3 | – | 0 |
| New Mexico | 0 | – | 2 | – | 0 | 1 | – | 7 | – | 0 |
| Arizona State–Flagstaff | 0 | – | 0 | – | 0 | 2 | – | 2 | – | 0 |
$ – Conference champion

The 1944 New Mexico Lobos football team represented the University of New Mexico in the Border Conference during the 1944 college football season. In their third season under head coach Willis Barnes, the Lobos compiled a 1–7 record (0–2 against conference opponents), finished last in the conference, and were outscored by opponents by a total of 261 to 87.

== Schedule ==
| Date | Time | Opponent | Site | Result | Attendance | Source |
|---|---|---|---|---|---|---|
| September 16 | 8:00 p.m. | Amarillo AAF* | Hilltop Stadium; Albuquerque, NM | L 2–21 | 6,000 | |
| September 23 | | Arizona State–Flagstaff* | Hilltop Stadium; Albuquerque, NM | W 47–14 | | |
| September 30 | | Colorado College*^{†} | Hilltop Stadium; Albuquerque, NM | L 7–25 | | |
| October 7 | | West Texas State | Hilltop Stadium; Albuquerque, NM | L 12–19 | | |
| October 14 | | vs. No. 15 Second Air Force* | Kidd Field; El Paso, TX | L 6–89 | 10,000 | |
| November 4 | | vs. Colorado* | Centennial High School Stadium; Pueblo, CO | L 0–39 | | |
| November 11 | | Denver* | Hilltop Stadium; Albuquerque, NM | L 6–41 | | |
| November 18 | | at Texas Tech | Tech Field; Lubbock, TX | L 7–13 | 1,500 | |
*Non-conference game; ^{†}Homecoming; Rankings from Coaches' Poll released prior to the game; All times are in Mountain time
