= 1946 Drake Bulldogs football team =

American college football season

1946 Drake Bulldogs football
- Conference: Missouri Valley Conference
- Record: 2–6–1 (0–4 MVC)
- Head coach: Vee Green (14th season)
- Home stadium: Drake Stadium

1946 Missouri Valley Conference football standings
	Conf.					Overall
Team	W		L		T	W		L		T
No. 17 Tulsa $	3	–	0	–	0	9	–	1	–	0
Wichita	2	–	1	–	0	5	–	5	–	0
Saint Louis	1	–	1	–	0	4	–	6	–	0
Oklahoma A&M	1	–	1	–	0	3	–	7	–	1
Drake	0	–	4	–	0	2	–	6	–	1
$ – Conference champion; Rankings from AP Poll

The 1946 Drake Bulldogs football team was an American football team that represented Drake University as a member of the Missouri Valley Conference (MVC) during the 1946 college football season. In their 14th and final season under head coach Vee Green, the Bulldogs compiled a 2–6–1 record (0–4 against MVC opponents), finished last in the conference, and were outscored by a total of 247 to 78. The team played its home games at Drake Stadium in Des Moines, Iowa.

== Schedule ==
Date	Opponent	Site	Result	Attendance	Source
September 20	St. Ambrose*	Drake Stadium; Des Moines, IA	W 26–13	12,000	
September 27	at Texas Mines*	Kidd Field; El Paso, TX	W 7–2	7,000	
October 5	Tulsa	Drake Stadium; Des Moines, IA	L 13–48	13,000	
October 11	Wichita	Drake Stadium; Des Moines, IA	L 6–12	5,500	
October 19	Saint Louis^{†}	Drake Stadium; Des Moines, IA	L 6–27	6,200	
October 25	at Detroit*	University of Detroit Stadium; Detroit, MI	L 6–33	16,572	
November 9	at Iowa State*	Clyde Williams Field; Ames, IA	T 7–7	9,116	
November 16	at Iowa State Teachers*	O. R. Latham Field; Cedar Falls, IA (rivalry)	L 0–46	3,500	
November 23	at Oklahoma A&M	Lewis Field; Stillwater, OK	L 7–59	13,500	
*Non-conference game; ^{†}Homecoming
