= 1946 Texas Mines Miners football team =

American college football season

1946 Texas Mines Miners football
- Conference: Border Conference
- Record: 3–6 (2–4 Border)
- Head coach: Jack Curtice (1st season)
- Home stadium: Kidd Field

1946 Border Conference football standings
	Conf.					Overall
Team	W		L		T	W		L		T
Hardin–Simmons $	6	–	0	–	0	11	–	0	–	0
Texas Tech	3	–	1	–	0	8	–	3	–	0
New Mexico	4	–	2	–	1	5	–	5	–	2
Arizona	2	–	2	–	1	4	–	4	–	2
West Texas State	3	–	4	–	0	5	–	5	–	0
Arizona State–Flagstaff	1	–	2	–	1	5	–	2	–	2
Texas Mines	2	–	4	–	0	3	–	6	–	0
Arizona State	1	–	4	–	1	2	–	7	–	2
New Mexico A&M	1	–	4	–	0	4	–	5	–	0
$ – Conference champion

The 1946 Texas Mines Miners football team was an American football team that represented the Texas School of Mines (now known as the University of Texas at El Paso) as a member of the Border Conference during the 1946 college football season. In its first season under head coach Jack Curtice, the team compiled a 3–6 record (2–4 against Border Conference opponents), finished seventh in the conference, and was outscored by a total of 150 to 136.

== Schedule ==
Date	Opponent	Site	Result	Attendance	Source
September 27	Drake	Kidd Field; El Paso, TX	L 2–7	7,000	
October 12	at Arizona	Arizona Stadium; Tucson, AZ	L 13–26	12,000	
October 19	West Texas State	Kidd Field; El Paso, TX	W 26–20	7,000	
October 26	Houston*	Kidd Field; El Paso, TX	W 20–7	7,500	
November 2	at New Mexico	Lobo Stadium; Albuquerque, NM	L 13–21	7,000	
November 9	at Arizona State	Goodwin Stadium; Tempe, AZ	W 34–20		
November 16	Hardin–Simmons	Kidd Field; El Paso, TX	L 7–20	8,000	
November 22	BYU	Kidd Field; El Paso, TX	L 13–14		
November 28	New Mexico A&M^{†}	Kidd Field; El Paso, TX (rivalry)	L 7–14	9,000	
*Non-conference game; ^{†}Homecoming
