= 1946 Arizona State Sun Devils football team =

American college football season

1946 Arizona State Sun Devils football
- Conference: Border Conference
- Record: 2–7–2 (1–4–1 Border)
- Head coach: Steve Coutchie (1st season)
- Home stadium: Goodwin Stadium

1946 Border Conference football standings
	Conf.					Overall
Team	W		L		T	W		L		T
Hardin–Simmons $	6	–	0	–	0	11	–	0	–	0
Texas Tech	3	–	1	–	0	8	–	3	–	0
New Mexico	4	–	2	–	1	5	–	5	–	2
Arizona	2	–	2	–	1	4	–	4	–	2
West Texas State	3	–	4	–	0	5	–	5	–	0
Arizona State–Flagstaff	1	–	2	–	1	5	–	2	–	2
Texas Mines	2	–	4	–	0	3	–	6	–	0
Arizona State	1	–	4	–	1	2	–	7	–	2
New Mexico A&M	1	–	4	–	0	4	–	5	–	0
$ – Conference champion

The 1946 Arizona State Sun Devils football team was an American football team that represented Arizona State College (later renamed Arizona State University) in the Border Conference during the 1946 college football season. In their first and only season under head coach Steve Coutchie, the Sun Devils compiled a 2–7–2 record (1–4–1 against Border opponents) and were outscored by their opponents by a combined total of 313 to 93.

== Schedule ==
Date	Time	Opponent	Site	Result	Attendance	Source
September 21		Williams Field*	Goodwin Stadium; Tempe, AZ	T 6–6	6,000	
September 28		at Arizona	Arizona Stadium; Tucson, AZ (rivalry)	L 0–67	12,000	
October 5		Pepperdine*	Goodwin Stadium; Tempe, AZ	W 13–12		
October 12		at Nevada*	Mackay Stadium; Reno, NV	L 2–74		
October 19		Portland*	Goodwin Stadium; Tempe, AZ	L 0–13		
October 26	7:00 p.m.	vs. Hardin–Simmons	Mustang Bowl; Sweetwater, TX	L 6–46		
November 2		at New Mexico A&M	Quesenberry Field; Las Cruces, NM	W 14–7		
November 9		Texas Mines	Goodwin Stadium; Tempe, AZ	L 20–34		
November 16		Arizona State–Flagstaff	Goodwin Stadium; Tempe, AZ	T 13–13		
November 23		West Texas State	Goodwin Stadium; Tempe, AZ	L 0–7		
November 28		at Wichita*	Veterans Field; Wichita, KS	L 19–34		
*Non-conference game; All times are in Mountain time
