= 1946 North Dakota Fighting Sioux football team =

American college football season

1946 North Dakota Fighting Sioux football
- Conference: North Central Conference
- Record: 5–3 (2–2 NCC)
- Head coach: Red Jarrett (2nd season)
- Home stadium: Memorial Stadium

1946 North Central Conference football standings
	Conf.					Overall
Team	W		L		T	W		L		T
Iowa State Teachers $	2	–	0	–	1	4	–	1	–	2
North Dakota Agricultural	4	–	1	–	0	5	–	3	–	0
South Dakota State	2	–	1	–	2	3	–	3	–	2
North Dakota	2	–	2	–	0	4	–	3	–	0
Morningside	2	–	3	–	1	3	–	5	–	1
South Dakota	1	–	2	–	0	2	–	4	–	0
Augustana (SD)	0	–	4	–	0	0	–	6	–	1
$ – Conference champion

The 1946 North Dakota Fighting Sioux football team, also known as the Nodaks, was an American football team that represented the University of North Dakota in the North Central Conference (NCC) during the 1946 college football season. In its second year under head coach Red Jarrett, the team compiled a 5–3 record (2–2 against NCC opponents) and outscored opponents by a total of 137 to 110. The team played its home games at Memorial Stadium in Grand Forks, North Dakota.

== Schedule ==
Date	Opponent	Site	Result	Attendance	Source
September 13	at Bemidji State*	Bemidji, MN	W 25–0		
September 20	Luther*	Memorial Stadium; Grand Forks, ND	W 12–6		
September 27	St. Thomas (MN)*	Memorial Stadium; Grand Forks, ND	W 13–6	6,000	
October 4	Augustana (SD)	Memorial Stadium; Grand Forks, ND	W 20–6		
October 11	South Dakota	Memorial Stadium; Grand Forks, ND (rivalry)	W 21–6		
October 19	North Dakota Agricultural^{†}	Memorial Stadium; Grand Forks, ND (rivalry)	L 0–31	8,000	
November 2	at Morningside	Sioux City, IA	L 39–41	2,000	
November 9	at Bradley*	Peoria Stadium; Peoria, IL	L 7–14	6,000	
*Non-conference game; ^{†}Homecoming
