= 1946 West Texas State Buffaloes football team =

American college football season

1946 West Texas State Buffaloes football
- Conference: Border Conference
- Record: 5–5 (3–4 Border)
- Head coach: Gus Miller (4th season; first 7 games); Windy Nicklaus (interim; remainder of season)
- Home stadium: Buffalo Stadium

1946 Border Conference football standings
	Conf.					Overall
Team	W		L		T	W		L		T
Hardin–Simmons $	6	–	0	–	0	11	–	0	–	0
Texas Tech	3	–	1	–	0	8	–	3	–	0
New Mexico	4	–	2	–	1	5	–	5	–	2
Arizona	2	–	2	–	1	4	–	4	–	2
West Texas State	3	–	4	–	0	5	–	5	–	0
Arizona State–Flagstaff	1	–	2	–	1	5	–	2	–	2
Texas Mines	2	–	4	–	0	3	–	6	–	0
Arizona State	1	–	4	–	1	2	–	7	–	2
New Mexico A&M	1	–	4	–	0	4	–	5	–	0
$ – Conference champion

The 1946 West Texas State Buffaloes football team was an American football team that represented West Texas State College (now known as West Texas A&M University) in the Border Conference during the 1946 college football season. In their fourth and final season under head coach Gus Miller, the Buffaloes compiled a 5–5 record (3–4 against conference opponents), finished in fifth place in the Border Conference, and were outscored by a total of 132 to 121.

== Schedule ==
Date	Opponent	Site	Result	Attendance	Source
September 21	at Texas Tech	Tech Field; Lubbock, TX	L 14–26	10,000	
September 27	Houston*	Buffalo Stadium; Canyon, TX	L 12–14	4,000	
October 4	at New Mexico	Lobo Stadium; Albuquerque, NM	L 0–6	7,000	
October 12	Colorado College*	Buffalo Stadium; Canyon, TX	W 13–12		
October 19	at Texas Mines	Kidd Field; El Paso, TX	L 20–26	7,000	
October 26	New Mexico A&M	Buffalo Stadium; Canyon, TX	W 21–14	6,000	
November 1	Arizona State–Flagstaff	Buffalo Stadium; Canyon, TX	W 20–0		
November 8	at Hardin–Simmons	Fair Park Stadium; Abilene, TX	L 7–28		
November 15	Wichita*	Buffalo Stadium; Canyon, TX	W 7–6		
November 23	at Arizona State	Goodwin Stadium; Tempe, AZ	W 7–0		
*Non-conference game
