= 1945 West Texas State Buffaloes football team =

American college football season

1945 West Texas State Buffaloes football
- Conference: Border Conference
- Record: 2–6 (0–2 Border)
- Head coach: Gus Miller (3rd season)
- Home stadium: Buffalo Stadium

1945 Border Conference football standings
	Conf.					Overall
Team	W		L		T	W		L		T
New Mexico	1	–	0	–	1	6	–	1	–	1
Texas Tech	1	–	0	–	1	3	–	5	–	2
West Texas State	0	–	2	–	0	2	–	6	–	0
Arizona	0	–	0	–	0	5	–	0	–	0
Arizona State–Flagstaff	0	–	0	–	0	2	–	3	–	0
$ – Conference champion

The 1945 West Texas State Buffaloes football team represented West Texas State College—now known as West Texas A&M University–as a member of the Border Conference during the 1946 college football season. Led by third-year head coach Gus Miller, the Buffaloes compiled an overall record of 2–6 with a mark of 0–2 in conference play, placing third in the Border Conference.

== Schedule ==
Date	Time	Opponent	Site	Result	Attendance	Source
September 15	8:30 p.m.	Eastern New Mexico*	Buffalo Stadium; Canyon, TX	W 56–7		
September 22		at Baylor*	Municipal Stadium; Waco, TX	L 0–32	6,000	
September 29	8:00 p.m.	at Tulsa*	Skelly Field; Tulsa, OK	L 0–32	3,500	
October 6	7:30 p.m.	New Mexico	Buffalo Stadium; Canyon, TX	L 0–13		
October 13	8:00 p.m.	at Amarillo AAF*	Butler Field; Amarillo, TX	L 12–21		
October 27		at Texas Tech	Tech Field; Lubbock, TX	L 6–12	6,000	
November 3	3:00 p.m.	Dalhart AAF*^{†}	Buffalo Stadium; Canyon, TX	W 21–0	4,000	
November 17		at Colorado College*	Washburn Field; Colorado Springs, Co	L 19–20	5,000	
*Non-conference game; ^{†}Homecoming; All times are in Central time
