= 1946 Arizona Wildcats football team =

American college football season

1946 Arizona Wildcats football
- Conference: Border Conference
- Record: 4–4–2 (2–2–1 Border)
- Head coach: Mike Casteel (6th season)
- Captain: Virgil Floyd Mars
- Home stadium: Varsity Stadium

1946 Border Conference football standings
	Conf.					Overall
Team	W		L		T	W		L		T
Hardin–Simmons $	6	–	0	–	0	11	–	0	–	0
Texas Tech	3	–	1	–	0	8	–	3	–	0
New Mexico	4	–	2	–	1	5	–	5	–	2
Arizona	2	–	2	–	1	4	–	4	–	2
West Texas State	3	–	4	–	0	5	–	5	–	0
Arizona State–Flagstaff	1	–	2	–	1	5	–	2	–	2
Texas Mines	2	–	4	–	0	3	–	6	–	0
Arizona State	1	–	4	–	1	2	–	7	–	2
New Mexico A&M	1	–	4	–	0	4	–	5	–	0
$ – Conference champion

The 1946 Arizona Wildcats football team represented the University of Arizona in the Border Conference during the 1946 college football season. In their sixth season under head coach Mike Casteel, the Wildcats compiled a 4–4–2 record (2–2–1 against Border opponents), finished in fourth place in the conference, and outscored their opponents, 218 to 136. The team captain was Virgil Floyd Marsh.

Arizona was ranked at No. 94 in the final Litkenhous Difference by Score System rankings for 1946.

The team played its home games in Varsity Stadium in Tucson, Arizona.

== Schedule ==
Date	Opponent	Site	Result	Attendance	Source
September 28	Arizona State	Varsity Stadium; Tucson, AZ (rivalry)	W 67–0	12,000	
October 5	at Utah*	Ute Stadium; Salt Lake City, UT	L 7–14	18,000	
October 12	Texas Mines	Varsity Stadium; Tucson, AZ	W 27–13	12,000	
October 19	Pacific (CA)*	Varsity Stadium; Tucson, AZ	W 47–13	12,500	
October 26	at Marquette*	Marquette Stadium; Milwaukee, WI	L 0–20	15,000	
November 2	Hardin–Simmons	Varsity Stadium; Tucson, AZ	L 8–19	11,000	
November 9	Santa Clara*^{†}	Varsity Stadium; Tucson, AZ	T 21–21	11,500	
November 16	at New Mexico	Zimmerman Field; Albuquerque, NM (rivalry)	T 13–13	8,000	
November 23	Texas Tech	Varsity Stadium; Tucson, AZ	L 0–16	9,000	
November 30	Kansas State*	Varsity Stadium; Tucson, AZ	W 28–7	10,000	
*Non-conference game; ^{†}Homecoming
