= 1946 Saint Louis Billikens football team =

American college football season

1946 Saint Louis Billikens football
- Conference: Missouri Valley Conference
- Record: 4–6 (1–1 MVC)
- Head coach: Dukes Duford (7th season)
- Home stadium: Walsh Stadium

1946 Missouri Valley Conference football standings
	Conf.					Overall
Team	W		L		T	W		L		T
No. 17 Tulsa $	3	–	0	–	0	9	–	1	–	0
Wichita	2	–	1	–	0	5	–	5	–	0
Saint Louis	1	–	1	–	0	4	–	6	–	0
Oklahoma A&M	1	–	1	–	0	3	–	7	–	1
Drake	0	–	4	–	0	2	–	6	–	1
$ – Conference champion; Rankings from AP Poll

The 1946 Saint Louis Billikens football team was an American football team that represented Saint Louis University as a member of the Missouri Valley Conference (MVC) during the 1946 college football season. In its seventh season under head coach Dukes Duford, the team compiled a 4–6 record (1–1 against MVC opponents), finished third in the conference, and was outscored by a total of 164 to 160. The team played its home games at Walsh Stadium in St. Louis.

== Schedule ==
Date	Opponent	Site	Result	Attendance	Source
September 20	Missouri-Rolla*	Walsh Stadium; St. Louis, MO	W 24–0	12,533	
September 28	at Marquette*	Marquette Stadium; Milwaukee, WI	L 0–26	12,000	
October 4	Missouri*	Walsh Stadium; St. Louis, MO	L 14–19	17,951	
October 12	at Auburn*	Legion Field; Birmingham, AL	L 7–27	12,000	
October 19	at Drake	Drake Stadium; Des Moines, IA	W 27–6	6,200	
October 26	Georgetown^{†}*	Walsh Stadium; St. Louis, MO	L 7–13	15,896	
November 2	South Dakota*	Walsh Stadium; St. Louis, MO	W 41–7	3,337	
November 9	Wichita	Walsh Stadium; St. Louis, MO	L 0–13	2,500	
November 17	Detroit*	Walsh Stadium; St. Louis, MO	L 14–33	8,712	
November 28	at Bradley*	Peoria, IL	W 26–20		
*Non-conference game; ^{†}Homecoming
