= 1946 New Mexico A&M Aggies football team =

American college football season

1946 New Mexico A&M Aggies football
- Conference: Border Conference
- Record: 4–5 (1–4 Border)
- Head coach: Raymond A. Curfman (1st season)
- Home stadium: Quesenberry Field

1946 Border Conference football standings
	Conf.					Overall
Team	W		L		T	W		L		T
Hardin–Simmons $	6	–	0	–	0	11	–	0	–	0
Texas Tech	3	–	1	–	0	8	–	3	–	0
New Mexico	4	–	2	–	1	5	–	5	–	2
Arizona	2	–	2	–	1	4	–	4	–	2
West Texas State	3	–	4	–	0	5	–	5	–	0
Arizona State–Flagstaff	1	–	2	–	1	5	–	2	–	2
Texas Mines	2	–	4	–	0	3	–	6	–	0
Arizona State	1	–	4	–	1	2	–	7	–	2
New Mexico A&M	1	–	4	–	0	4	–	5	–	0
$ – Conference champion

The 1946 New Mexico A&M Aggies football team was an American football team that represented New Mexico College of Agriculture and Mechanical Arts (now known as New Mexico State University) as a member of the Border Conference during the 1946 college football season. In its first year under head coach Raymond A. Curfman, the team compiled a 4–5 record and outscored opponents by a total of 155 to 154. The team played home games at Quesenberry Field in Las Cruces, New Mexico.

== Schedule ==
Date	Opponent	Site	Result	Attendance	Source
September 21	New Mexico Teachers*	Quesenberry Field; Las Cruces, NM	W 37–0	3,500	
September 28	at Tulsa*	Skelly Field; Tulsa, OK	L 0–52	12,300	
October 12	New Mexico^{†}	Quesenberry Field; Las Cruces, NM (rivalry)	L 6–7	6,500	
October 19	at Arizona State–Flagstaff	Skidmore Field; Flagstaff, AZ	L 6–14		
October 26	at West Texas State	Buffalo Stadium; Canyon, TX	L 14–21	6,000	
November 2	Arizona State	Quesenberry Field; Las Cruces, NM	L 7–14		
November 9	Sul Ross*	Quesenberry Field; Las Cruces, NM	W 26–25	2,500	
November 16	Colorado State–Greeley*	Quesenberry Field; Las Cruces, NM	W 20–7	1,200	
November 28	at Texas Mines	Kidd Field; El Paso, TX (rivalry)	W 14–7	9,000	
*Non-conference game; ^{†}Homecoming
