= 1945 Arizona Wildcats football team =

American college football season

1945 Arizona Wildcats football
- Conference: Border Conference
- Record: 5–0 (0–0 Border)
- Head coach: Mike Casteel (5th season)
- Captain: Boyd Morse
- Home stadium: Arizona Stadium

1945 Border Conference football standings
	Conf.					Overall
Team	W		L		T	W		L		T
New Mexico	1	–	0	–	1	6	–	1	–	1
Texas Tech	1	–	0	–	1	3	–	5	–	2
West Texas State	0	–	2	–	0	2	–	6	–	0
Arizona	0	–	0	–	0	5	–	0	–	0
Arizona State–Flagstaff	0	–	0	–	0	2	–	3	–	0
$ – Conference champion

The 1945 Arizona Wildcats football team represented the University of Arizona as an independent during the 1945 college football season. In their fifth season under head coach Mike Casteel, and after two years without a football program during World War II, the Wildcats compiled a perfect 5–0 record, shut out three of five opponents, and outscored all opponents, 193 to 12. The team captain was Boyd Morse. The team played its home games at Arizona Stadium in Tucson, Arizona.

== Schedule ==
Date	Opponent	Site	Result	Attendance	Source
October 14	Arizona State–Flagstaff	Arizona Stadium; Tucson, AZ	W 52–6	9,500	
October 20	at San Diego State	Balboa Stadium; San Diego, CA	W 46–0	25,000	
October 27	Williams Field	Arizona Stadium; Tucson, AZ	W 30–0	7,500	
November 3	Luke Field	Arizona Stadium; Tucson, AZ	cancelled		
November 10	Cal Poly	Arizona Stadium; Tucson, AZ	W 37–6	6,000	
November 17	San Diego State	Arizona Stadium; Tucson, AZ	W 28–0	8,500	
