= 1946 Utah State Aggies football team =

American college football season

1946 Utah State Aggies football

MSC co-champion

Raisin Bowl, L 0–20 vs. San Jose State
- Conference: Mountain States Conference
- Record: 7–2–1 (4–1–1 MSC)
- Head coach: Dick Romney (27th season)
- Home stadium: Aggie Stadium

1946 Mountain States Conference football standings
	Conf.					Overall
Team	W		L		T	W		L		T
Utah State $	4	–	1	–	1	7	–	2	–	1
Denver $	4	–	1	–	1	5	–	5	–	1
Utah	4	–	2	–	0	8	–	3	–	0
Colorado	3	–	2	–	1	5	–	4	–	1
BYU	3	–	2	–	1	5	–	4	–	1
Colorado A&M	1	–	5	–	0	2	–	7	–	0
Wyoming	0	–	6	–	0	1	–	8	–	1
$ – Conference champion

The 1946 Utah State Aggies football team was an American football team that represented Utah State Agricultural College in the Mountain States Conference (MSC) during the 1946 college football season. In their 27th season under head coach Dick Romney, the Aggies compiled a 7–2–1 record (4–1–1 against MSC opponents), tied for the MSC championship, and outscored opponents by a total of 220 to 75. The 1946 squad continues to hold the school records for: most rushing yards per attempt (5.9); lowest pass completion percentage allowed (.330); fewest touchdown passes allowed (zero); and fewest total offense attempts allowed per game (50.6).

After losing only one game during the regular season, the team played in the school's first bowl game – the 1947 Raisin Bowl on January 1, 1947, in Fresno, California. The Aggies were defeated by San Jose State, 20-0.

Four Utah State players were named to the all-conference team selected by the Associated Press: center Ralph Maughan (first team), tackle George Nelson (first team), halfback Jay Van Noy (second team), and end Norvel Hansen (second team). Van Noy went on to play six games in Major League Baseball for the St. Louis Cardinals.

Utah State was ranked at No. 91 in the final Litkenhous Difference by Score System rankings for 1946.

== Schedule ==
Date	Opponent	Site	Result	Attendance	Source
September 28	Idaho Southern Branch*	Aggie Stadium; Logan, UT	W 47–0		
October 5	at Colorado	Folsom Field; Boulder, CO	L 0–6	9,200	
October 12	Montana State*	Aggie Stadium; Logan, UT	W 28–14	5,000	
October 19	Colorado A&M^{†}	Aggie Stadium; Logan, UT	W 48–0	8,000	
October 26	at Montana	Dornblaser Field; Missoula, MT	W 26–0	12,000	
November 9	BYU	Aggie Stadium; Logan, UT (rivalry)	T 0–0	8,000	
November 16	Wyoming	Aggie Stadium; Logan, UT (rivalry)	W 21–7		
November 28	at Utah	Ute Stadium; Salt Lake City, UT (rivalry)	W 22–14	23,166	
December 7	at Denver	DU Stadium; Denver, CO	W 28–14	20,000	
January 1, 1947	vs. San Jose State*	Ratcliffe Stadium; Fresno, CA (Raisin Bowl)	L 0–20	13,000	
*Non-conference game; ^{†}Homecoming

== 1947 NFL draft ==
The 1947 NFL draft was held on December 16, 1946. The following Aggie was selected.

Round	Pick	Player	Position	NFL club
18	156	Ralph Maugham	End	Detroit Lions
