= 1947 Alamo Bowl =

Alamo Bowl
- Bowl game
Hardin–Simmons Cowboys	Denver Pioneers
(10–0)	(5–4–1)
20	0
Head coach: Warren B. Woodson	Head coach: Cac Hubbard
	1	2	3	4	Total
Hardin–Simmons	0	6	7	7	20
Denver	0	0	0	0	0
- Date: January 4, 1947
- Season: 1946
- Stadium: Alamo Stadium
- Location: San Antonio, Texas
- Attendance: 3,730

The 1947 Alamo Bowl was a post-season college football bowl game in Texas between the Hardin–Simmons Cowboys and Denver Pioneers, played in San Antonio on January 4 at Alamo Stadium. Originally scheduled for New Year's Day, freezing temperatures and icy conditions postponed the game three days.

After a scoreless first quarter on a windy 28 °F (−2 °C) Saturday afternoon, Hardin–Simmons shut out Denver 20–0. Poor attendance (3,730) caused the game to be a financial failure and was not scheduled again.

There is no relation between this game and the current Alamo Bowl, which began in 1993.

== See also ==
- List of college bowl games
