= 1946 Oklahoma A&M Cowboys football team =

American college football season

1946 Oklahoma A&M Cowboys football
- Conference: Missouri Valley Conference
- Record: 3–7–1 (1–1 MVC)
- Head coach: Jim Lookabaugh (8th season)
- Home stadium: Lewis Field

1946 Missouri Valley Conference football standings
	Conf.					Overall
Team	W		L		T	W		L		T
No. 17 Tulsa $	3	–	0	–	0	9	–	1	–	0
Wichita	2	–	1	–	0	5	–	5	–	0
Saint Louis	1	–	1	–	0	4	–	6	–	0
Oklahoma A&M	1	–	1	–	0	3	–	7	–	1
Drake	0	–	4	–	0	2	–	6	–	1
$ – Conference champion; Rankings from AP Poll

The 1946 Oklahoma A&M Cowboys football team represented Oklahoma Agricultural and Mechanical College (later renamed Oklahoma State University–Stillwater) in the Missouri Valley Conference during the 1946 college football season. In their eighth year under head coach Jim Lookabaugh, the Cowboys compiled a 3–7–1 record (1–1 against conference opponents), tied for third place in the conference, and were outscored by opponents by a combined total of 264 to 202.

The team's statistical leaders included halfback Bob Meinert with 344 rushing yards, Bob Fenimore with 497 passing yards and 38 points scored, and end Neill Armstrong with 479 receiving yards. Armstrong also tied for the lead in the nation with 32 pass receptions in 1946.

Two Oklahoma A&M players received first-team All-Missouri Valley Conference honors in 1946: Bob Fenimore and Neill Armstrong.

Oklahoma A&M was ranked at No. 60 in the final Litkenhous Difference by Score System rankings for 1946.

The team played its home games at Lewis Field in Stillwater, Oklahoma.

== Schedule ==
Date	Opponent	Site	Result	Attendance	Source
September 21	Denver*	Lewis Field; Stillwater, OK	W 40–7	15,000	
September 28	Arkansas*	Lewis Field; Stillwater, OK	T 21–21	16,000	
October 5	at Texas*	Memorial Stadium; Austin, TX	L 6–54	45,000	
October 11	at SMU*	Cotton Bowl; Dallas, TX	L 6–15	28,000	
October 19	at Georgia*	Sanford Stadium; Athens, GA	L 13–33	35,000	
October 25	TCU*	Taft Stadium; Oklahoma City, OK	W 7–6	16,000	
November 2	at Kansas*	Memorial Stadium; Lawrence, KS	L 13–14	20,000	
November 9	at Tulsa	Skelly Field; Tulsa, OK (rivalry)	L 18–20	17,000	
November 16	at Texas Tech*	Tech Field; Lubbock, TX	L 7–14	13,000	
November 23	Drake^{†}	Lewis Field; Stillwater, OK	W 59–7	13,500	
November 30	No. 17 Oklahoma*	Lewis Field; Stillwater, OK (Bedlam Series)	L 12–73	18,500	
*Non-conference game; ^{†}Homecoming; Rankings from AP Poll released prior to the game

== After the season ==
The 1947 NFL draft was held on December 16, 1946. The following Cowboys were selected.

Round	Pick	Player	Position	NFL club
1	1	Bob Fenimore	Halfback	Chicago Bears
1	8	Neill Armstrong	End	Philadelphia Eagles
11	92	Tom Moulton	Center	Green Bay Packers
24	223	J. D. Cheek	Tackle	Los Angeles Rams
