= 1946 Sun Bowl =

American college football game

Denver Pioneers	New Mexico Lobos
(4–4–1)	(5–1–1)
Mountain States	Border Conference
24	34
Head coach: Cac Hubbard	Head coach: Willis Barnes
	1	2	3	4	Total
Denver	10	0	7	7	24
New Mexico	0	13	0	21	34
- Date: January 1, 1946
- Season: 1945
- Stadium: Kidd Field
- Location: El Paso, Texas
- Attendance: 15,000

The 1946 Sun Bowl was a college football postseason bowl game between the New Mexico Lobos and the Denver Pioneers.

== Background ==
New Mexico was in their first Sun Bowl since 1939, while Mountain States Conference champion Denver was in their first bowl game. Before the game, a minister intoned a prayer dedicating this game to the nine members from the previous Lobo team to make it in the Sun Bowl, who had died fighting in World War II.

== Game summary ==
Denver took a 10-0 lead after one quarter on Karamigios' 21 yard touchdown run and Miller's 28 yard field goal. New Mexico responded with a 65 yard interception return for a touchdown by Rudy Krall. A 70 yard drive culminated in a Don Rumley 9 yard touchdown run to make it 13-10 at halftime. John Adams ran in for a two yard score to give Denver the lead. New Mexico scored three straight touchdowns in the fourth quarter, with two of those touchdowns coming to Dick Moser (Bill Moseley) from Rumley, with the final touchdown pass going to Julian McDonald to make it 34-17. With less than two minutes remaining, Karamigios caught a touchdown pass Vernon Cochran, but the scoring stopped after that, as New Mexico won their first ever bowl game, and the first win for a Border Conference team. Rumley threw for 8-of-12 for 207 yards and three touchdowns.

== Aftermath ==
The Lobos made another bowl game the following year, but have never returned to the Sun Bowl since this game. Denver would also make a bowl game appearance the following year, which was their last. In a strange revelation, Mosley admitted in 2007 to playing under an assumed name (Dick Moser) in order to preserve his eligibility at Kentucky.

== Statistics ==
Statistics	New Mexico	Denver
First downs	15	13
Yards rushing	171	238
Yards passing	207	39
Total yards	378	277
Punt Average	44.0	33.0
Fumbles-Lost	1-1	1-0
Interceptions	1	1
Penalty yards	90	25
