= 1946 Iowa State Teachers Panthers football team =

American college football season

1946 Iowa State Teachers Panthers football

NCC champion
- Conference: North Central Conference
- Record: 4–1–2 (2–0–1 NCC)
- Head coach: Clyde Starbeck (9th season)
- Home stadium: O. R. Latham Stadium

1946 North Central Conference football standings
	Conf.					Overall
Team	W		L		T	W		L		T
Iowa State Teachers $	2	–	0	–	1	4	–	1	–	2
North Dakota Agricultural	4	–	1	–	0	5	–	3	–	0
South Dakota State	2	–	1	–	2	3	–	3	–	2
North Dakota	2	–	2	–	0	4	–	3	–	0
Morningside	2	–	3	–	1	3	–	5	–	1
South Dakota	1	–	2	–	0	2	–	4	–	0
Augustana (SD)	0	–	4	–	0	0	–	6	–	1
$ – Conference champion

The 1946 Iowa State Teachers Panthers football team represented Iowa State Teachers College in the North Central Conference (NCC) during the 1946 college football season. In its ninth season under head coach Clyde Starbeck, the team compiled a 4–1–2 record (2–0–1 against NCC opponents), shut out it final four opponents, won the NCC championship, and outscored opponent by a total of 175 to 32.

Iowa Teachers ranked third nationally in total defense among small college teams, giving up an average of only 108.5 yards per game. The team was ranked at No. 85 in the final Litkenhous Difference by Score System rankings for 1946.

Five players were selected to the all-conference team: ends Nick Avelchas and Cy Bellock; halfbacks Pudge Camarata and Bob Williams; tackle Jason Loving; and guard Paul Salzman.

== Schedule ==
Date	Opponent	Site	Result	Attendance	Source
September 28	at South Dakota State	Brookings, SD	T 6–6		
October 5	at Iowa State*	Clyde Williams Field; Ames, IA	L 18–20	12,000	
October 12	Hamline*	O. R. Latham Field; Cedar Falls, IA	W 46–6		
October 19	Western Michigan*	O. R. Latham Field; Cedar Falls, IA	T 0–0		
October 26	at Morningside	Public Schools Stadium; Sioux City, IA	W 38–0	3,000	
November 2	North Dakota Agricultural	O. R. Latham Field; Cedar Falls, IA	W 21–0	4,000	
November 16	Drake	O. R. Latham Stadium; Cedar Falls, IA	W 46–0	3,500	
*Non-conference game
