= 1946 South Dakota State Jackrabbits football team =

American college football season

1946 South Dakota State Jackrabbits football
- Conference: North Central Conference
- Record: 3–3–2 (2–1–2 NCC)
- Head coach: Thurlo McCrady (5th season)

1946 North Central Conference football standings
| | Conf. | | | | | Overall |
| Team | W | | L | | T | W | | L | | T |
|---|---|---|---|---|---|---|---|---|---|---|
| Iowa State Teachers $ | 2 | – | 0 | – | 1 | 4 | – | 1 | – | 2 |
| North Dakota Agricultural | 4 | – | 1 | – | 0 | 5 | – | 3 | – | 0 |
| South Dakota State | 2 | – | 1 | – | 2 | 3 | – | 3 | – | 2 |
| North Dakota | 2 | – | 2 | – | 0 | 4 | – | 3 | – | 0 |
| Morningside | 2 | – | 3 | – | 1 | 3 | – | 5 | – | 1 |
| South Dakota | 1 | – | 2 | – | 0 | 2 | – | 4 | – | 0 |
| Augustana (SD) | 0 | – | 4 | – | 0 | 0 | – | 6 | – | 1 |
$ – Conference champion

The 1946 South Dakota State Jackrabbits football team was an American football team that represented South Dakota State University in the North Central Conference during the 1946 college football season. In its fifth season under head coach Thurlo McCrady, the team compiled a 3–3–2 record and outscored opponents by a total of 131 to 76.

== Schedule ==
| Date | Opponent | Site | Result | Attendance | Source |
|---|---|---|---|---|---|
| September 21 | at Loras* | Dubuque, IA | L 18–23 | 4,500 | |
| September 28 | Iowa State Teachers | Brookings, SD | T 6–6 | | |
| October 5 | Manitoba | Brookings, SD | W 61–0 | | |
| October 12 | North Dakota Agricultural | Dacotah Field; Fargo, ND (rivalry) | L 0–6 | | |
| October 19 | Augustana (SD) | Brookings, SD (Hobo day) | W 26–6 | 5,000 | |
| October 26 | South Dakota | Inman Field; Vermillion, SD (rivalry) | W 20–0 | 6,000 | |
| November 2 | at Oklahoma City | Taft Stadium; Oklahoma City, OK | L 0–35 | 4,000 | |
| November 9 | Morningside | Brookings, SD | T 0–0 | | |
*Non-conference game
