= 1947 Harbor Bowl =

Montana State Bobcats	New Mexico Lobos
(5–3–1)	(5–5–1)
13	13
Head coach: Clyde Carpenter	Head coach: Willis Barnes
	1	2	3	4	Total
Montana State	0	13	0	0	13
New Mexico	6	0	0	7	13
- Date: January 1, 1947
- Season: 1946
- Stadium: Balboa Stadium
- Location: San Diego, California
- Attendance: 7,000

The 1947 Harbor Bowl was an American college football bowl game played on January 1, 1947 at Balboa Stadium in San Diego, California. The game pitted the New Mexico Lobos and the Montana State Bobcats. This was the inaugural Harbor Bowl game played.

== Background ==
The Lobos were 4-2-1 in the Border Intercollegiate Athletic Association, with wins over Northern Arizona, West Texas A&M, New Mexico State, and Texas Western. They lost to Hardin-Simmons (the BIAA champion), Utah, Colorado, Texas Tech and Hawaii All-Stars, while tying Arizona. This was their fourth bowl game appearance in eight years. Montana State (who were of independent affiliation) won games over BYU, Northern Colorado, Portland, North Dakota State, and Colorado Mines, while losing games to Utah State, Montana and Nevada, while tying Colorado College. This was their first ever bowl game.

== Game summary ==
- New Mexico - Lou Cullen 26 pass from Hubert Hackett (kick failed)
- Montana State - Neil Brooks 48 run (Bourdet run)
- Montana State - Ken Card 7 pass from Gene Bourdet (kick blocked)
- New Mexico - Bryan Brock 2 run (Hackett kick)

The Lobos rebounded from a 13-6 deficit to tie the game. The Lobos had the chance to win the game in the final minutes as they drove down the field to the 12 yard line of the Bobcats. A quarterback sack dropped them back to the 24, which set up a try for Hubert Hackett from 35 yards out. The kick was no good, however, and the game ended in a tie.

== Statistics ==
Statistics	New Mexico	Montana State
First downs	12	12
Rushing yards	182	155
Passing yards	83	180
Total yards	265	335
Passing	4–13–3	7–16–3
Punt average	38.0	50.0

== Aftermath ==
New Mexico did not go to a bowl game again until 1961. Montana State returned to a bowl game in 1956, which served as the National Association of Intercollegiate Athletics (NAIA) championship game
