= 1946 Wyoming Cowboys football team =

American college football season

1946 Wyoming Cowboys football
- Conference: Mountain States Conference
- Record: 1–8–1 (0–6 MSC)
- Head coach: Bunny Oakes (3rd season)
- Captain: None
- Home stadium: Corbett Field

1946 Mountain States Conference football standings
	Conf.					Overall
Team	W		L		T	W		L		T
Utah State $	4	–	1	–	1	7	–	2	–	1
Denver $	4	–	1	–	1	5	–	5	–	1
Utah	4	–	2	–	0	8	–	3	–	0
Colorado	3	–	2	–	1	5	–	4	–	1
BYU	3	–	2	–	1	5	–	4	–	1
Colorado A&M	1	–	5	–	0	2	–	7	–	0
Wyoming	0	–	6	–	0	1	–	8	–	1
$ – Conference champion

The 1946 Wyoming Cowboys football team was an American football team that represented the University of Wyoming in the Mountain States Conference (MSC) during the 1946 college football season. In their third and final season under head coach Bunny Oakes, the Cowboys compiled a 1–8–1 record (0–6 against MSC opponents), finished last in the conference, and were outscored by a total of 192 to 44.

Back Hank Kolasinski was selected by the International News Service as a first-team player on the 1946 All-Mountain States football team. Tackle Clayton was named to the second team.

== Schedule ==
Date	Opponent	Site	Result	Attendance	Source
September 21	Colorado State–Greeley	Corbett Field; Laramie, WY	W 7–0		
September 28	Colorado Mines	Corbett Field; Laramie, WY	T 7–7		
October 5	Colorado A&M	Corbett Field; Laramie, WY	L 0–7	4,700	
October 12	Colorado	Corbett Field; Laramie, WY	L 0–20	4,126	
October 19	at Minnesota	Memorial Stadium; Minneapolis, MN	L 0–46	46,087	
October 26	at Utah	Ute Stadium; Salt Lake City, UT	L 7–27	9,354	
November 2	at BYU	BYU Stadium; Provo, UT	L 3–6	3,500	
November 9	Denver	Corbett Field; Laramie, WY	L 6–19	1,500	
November 16	at Utah State	Aggie Stadium; Logan, UT (rivalry)	L 7–21	5,000	
November 24	at San Francisco	Kezar Stadium; San Francisco, CA	L 7–39	10,000	

== After the season ==
The 1947 NFL Draft was held on December 16, 1946. The following Cowboys were selected.

Round	Pick	Player	Position	NFL Club
21	191	Jim Clayton	Tackle	Philadelphia Eagles
23	207	Hank Kolaskinski	Back	Boston Yanks
