= 1945 Arizona State–Flagstaff Lumberjacks football team =

American college football season

1945 Arizona State–Flagstaff Lumberjacks football
- Conference: Border Conference
- Record: 5–2–2 (0–0 Border)
- Head coach: Frank Brickey (3rd season)
- Home stadium: Skidmore Field

1945 Border Conference football standings
	Conf.					Overall
Team	W		L		T	W		L		T
New Mexico	1	–	0	–	1	6	–	1	–	1
Texas Tech	1	–	0	–	1	3	–	5	–	2
West Texas State	0	–	2	–	0	2	–	6	–	0
Arizona	0	–	0	–	0	5	–	0	–	0
Arizona State–Flagstaff	0	–	0	–	0	2	–	3	–	0
$ – Conference champion

The 1945 Arizona State–Flagstaff Lumberjacks football team was an American football team that represented Arizona State Teachers College at Flagstaff (now known as Northern Arizona University) in the Border Conference during the 1945 college football season. In their third year under head coach Frank Brickey, the Lumberjacks compiled a 2–3 record and were outscored by a total of 86 to 64.

The team played its home games at Skidmore Field in Flagstaff, Arizona.

== Schedule ==
Date	Time	Opponent	Site	Result	Attendance	Source
September 22		Douglas AAF	Skidmore Field; Flagstaff, AZ	W 6–0		
September 29		Eastern New Mexico	Skidmore Field; Flagstaff, AZ	W 39–0		
October 6		at Fresno State	Skidmore Field; Flagstaff, AZ	L 0–19		
October 14		at Arizona	Arizona Stadium; Tucson, AZ	L 6–52	9,500	
October 20	2:00 p.m.	Luke Field*^{†}	Skidmore Field; Flagstaff, AZ	L 7–15		
*Non-conference game; ^{†}Homecoming; All times are in Mountain time
