= 1946 Wichita Shockers football team =

American college football season

1946 Wichita Shockers football
- Conference: Missouri Valley Conference
- Record: 5–5 (2–1 MVC)
- Head coach: Ralph Graham (2nd season)
- Home stadium: Veterans Field

1946 Missouri Valley Conference football standings
	Conf.					Overall
Team	W		L		T	W		L		T
No. 17 Tulsa $	3	–	0	–	0	9	–	1	–	0
Wichita	2	–	1	–	0	5	–	5	–	0
Saint Louis	1	–	1	–	0	4	–	6	–	0
Oklahoma A&M	1	–	1	–	0	3	–	7	–	1
Drake	0	–	4	–	0	2	–	6	–	1
$ – Conference champion; Rankings from AP Poll

The 1946 Wichita Shockers football team, sometimes known as the Wheatshockers, was an American football team that represented the Wichita University (now known as Wichita State University) as a member of the Missouri Valley Conference during the 1946 college football season. In its second season under head coach Ralph Graham, the team compiled a 5–5 record (2–1 against conference opponents), finished second out of five teams in the MVC, and was outscored opponents by a total of 135 to 119. The team played its home games at Veterans Field, now known as Cessna Stadium. The 1946 season was the first for Wichita after being classified as a "major college" football program.

== Schedule ==
Date	Opponent	Site	Result	Attendance	Source
September 21	Tulsa	Veterans Field; Wichita, KS	L 13–33	9,000	
September 28	at Dayton	University of Dayton Stadium; Dayton, OH	L 0–21	9,000	
October 5	at Kansas	Memorial Stadium; Lawrence, KS	L 7–14		
October 11	at Drake	Drake Stadium; Des Moines, IA	W 12–6	5,500	
October 19	Oklahoma City	Veterans Field; Wichita, KS	L 0–28		
November 2	at Washburn	Yager Stadium; Topeka, KS	W 21–0		
November 9	at Saint Louis	Walsh Stadium; St. Louis, MO	W 13–0	2,500	
November 15	at West Texas State	Canyon, TX	L 6–7		
November 23	Toledo	Veterans Field; Wichita, KS	W 13–7	7,000	
November 28	Arizona State	Veterans Field; Wichita, KS	W 34–19		
