= 1945 New Mexico Lobos football team =

American college football season

1945 New Mexico Lobos football

Sun Bowl, W 34–24 vs. Denver
- Conference: Border Conference
- Record: 6–1–1 (1–0–1 Border)
- Head coach: Willis Barnes (4th season)
- Home stadium: Lobo Stadium

1945 Border Conference football standings
	Conf.					Overall
Team	W		L		T	W		L		T
New Mexico	1	–	0	–	1	6	–	1	–	1
Texas Tech	1	–	0	–	1	3	–	5	–	2
West Texas State	0	–	2	–	0	2	–	6	–	0
Arizona	0	–	0	–	0	5	–	0	–	0
Arizona State–Flagstaff	0	–	0	–	0	2	–	3	–	0
$ – Conference champion

The 1945 New Mexico Lobos football team represented the University of New Mexico in the Border Conference during the 1945 college football season. In their fourth season under head coach Willis Barnes, the Lobos compiled a 6–1–1 record (1–0–1 against conference opponents), defeated Denver in the 1946 Sun Bowl, and outscored all opponents by a total of 208 to 61.

The team's 78–0 victory over Eastern New Mexico remains the second largest margin of victory in New Mexico school history. Captains were appointed by game for the 1945 season.

== Schedule ==
Date	Time	Opponent	Site	Result	Attendance	Source
September 22		Eastern New Mexico*	Lobo Stadium; Albuquerque, NM	W 78–0	4,000	
September 29		Lubbock AAF*	Lobo Stadium; Albuquerque, NM	W 39–0	5,000	
October 6	6:30 p.m.	at West Texas State	Buffalo Stadium; Canyon, TX	W 13–0		
October 13		at Colorado College*	Washburn Field; Colorado Springs, CO	W 6–4		
November 3		Colorado*	Lobo Stadium; Albuquerque, NM	W 12–6	8,000	
November 10		Utah*^{†}	Lobo Stadium; Albuquerque, NM	L 20–21	7,000	
November 24		Texas Tech	Lobo Stadium; Albuquerque, NM	T 6–6	8,000	
January 1, 1946		vs. Denver*	Kidd Field; El Paso, TX (Sun Bowl)	W 34–24	15,000	
*Non-conference game; ^{†}Homecoming; All times are in Mountain time
