= 1946 Marquette Hilltoppers football team =

American college football season

1946 Marquette Hilltoppers football
- Conference: Independent
- Record: 4–5
- Head coach: Frank Murray (16th season)
- Home stadium: Marquette Stadium

1946 Midwestern major college football independents records
	Conf.			Overall
Team	W	L	T	W		L		T
No. 1 Notre Dame		–		8	–	0	–	1
Cincinnati		–		9	–	2	–	0
Detroit		–		6	–	4	–	0
Michigan State		–		5	–	5	–	0
Marquette		–		4	–	5	–	0
Rankings from AP Poll

The 1946 Marquette Hilltoppers football team was an American football team that represented Marquette University as an independent during the 1946 college football season. In its 16th season under head coach Frank Murray, the team compiled a 4–5 record and was outscored by a total of 148 to 132.

Marquette was ranked at No. 68 in the final Litkenhous Difference by Score System rankings for 1946.

The team played its home games at Marquette Stadium in Milwaukee.

== Schedule ==
Date	Opponent	Site	Result	Attendance	Source
September 21	at Wisconsin	Camp Randall Stadium; Madison, WI	L 0–34	45,000	
September 28	Saint Louis	Marquette Stadium; Milwaukee, WI	W 26–0	12,000	
October 4	at Villanova	Shibe Park; Philadelphia, PA	L 13–26	21,000	
October 12	Idaho	Marquette Stadium; Milwaukee, WI	W 46–6	12,000	
October 19	at Pittsburgh	Pitt Stadium; Pittsburgh, PA	L 6–7	20,000	
October 26	Arizona	Marquette Stadium; Milwaukee, WI	W 20–0	15,000	
November 1	at Detroit	University of Detroit Stadium; Detroit, MI	W 21–20	10,350	
November 9	Kentucky	Marquette Stadium; Milwaukee, WI	L 0–35	> 12,000	
November 16	at Michigan State	Macklin Field; East Lansing, MI	L 0–20	21,441	

== After the season ==
The 1947 NFL Draft was held on December 16, 1946. The following Hilltopper was selected.

Round	Pick	Player	Position	NFL Club
22	196	Carl Schuette	Linebacker	Detroit Lions
