= 1946 BYU Cougars football team =

American college football season

1946 BYU Cougars football
- Conference: Mountain States Conference
- Record: 5–4–1 (3–2–1 MSC)
- Head coach: Eddie Kimball (6th season)

1946 Mountain States Conference football standings
	Conf.					Overall
Team	W		L		T	W		L		T
Utah State $	4	–	1	–	1	7	–	2	–	1
Denver $	4	–	1	–	1	5	–	5	–	1
Utah	4	–	2	–	0	8	–	3	–	0
Colorado	3	–	2	–	1	5	–	4	–	1
BYU	3	–	2	–	1	5	–	4	–	1
Colorado A&M	1	–	5	–	0	2	–	7	–	0
Wyoming	0	–	6	–	0	1	–	8	–	1
$ – Conference champion

The 1946 BYU Cougars football team was an American football team that represented Brigham Young University (BYU) as a member of the Mountain States Conference (MSC) during the 1946 college football season. In their sixth season under head coach Eddie Kimball, the Cougars compiled an overall record of 5–4–1 with a mark of 3–2–1 against conference opponents, finished fourth in the MSC, and were outscored by a total of 119 to 94.

== Schedule ==
Date	Opponent	Site	Result	Attendance	Source
September 22	Western State (CO)*	Cougar Stadium; Provo, UT	W 13–2		
September 28	at Montana State*	Gatton Field; Bozeman, MT	L 12–13	3,000	
October 4	at Denver	DU Stadium; Denver, CO	L 13–26		
October 12	Utah	Cougar Stadium; Provo, UT (rivalry)	L 6–35	12,500	
October 19	Colorado	Cougar Stadium; Provo, UT	W 10–7	5,000	
October 25	at San Jose State*	Spartan Stadium; San Jose, CA	L 0–14	10,000	
November 2	Wyoming	Cougar Stadium; Provo, UT	W 6–3	3,500	
November 9	at Utah State	Aggie Stadium; Logan, UT (rivalry)	T 0–0	8,000	
November 16	at Colorado A&M	Colorado Field; Fort Collins, CO	W 20–6	1,500	
November 22	at Texas Mines*	Kidd Field; El Paso, TX	W 14–13		
*Non-conference game

== After the season ==
The 1947 NFL Draft was held on December 16, 1946. The following Cougars were selected.

Round	Pick	Player	Position	NFL team
16	136	Reed Nilsen	Center	Detroit Lions
19	171	Scotty Deeds	Back	Chicago Cardinals
28	257	Dick Chatterton	Back	Boston Yanks
