= 1946 Colorado Buffaloes football team =

American college football season

1946 Colorado Buffaloes football
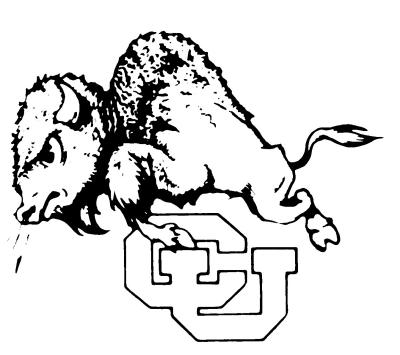
- Conference: Mountain States Conference
- Record: 5–4–1 (3–2–1 MSC)
- Head coach: James J. Yeager (4th season)
- Captain: Gus Shannon
- Home stadium: Folsom Field

1946 Mountain States Conference football standings
	Conf.					Overall
Team	W		L		T	W		L		T
Utah State $	4	–	1	–	1	7	–	2	–	1
Denver $	4	–	1	–	1	5	–	5	–	1
Utah	4	–	2	–	0	8	–	3	–	0
Colorado	3	–	2	–	1	5	–	4	–	1
BYU	3	–	2	–	1	5	–	4	–	1
Colorado A&M	1	–	5	–	0	2	–	7	–	0
Wyoming	0	–	6	–	0	1	–	8	–	1
$ – Conference champion

The 1946 Colorado Buffaloes football team was an American football team that represented the University of Colorado as a member of the Mountain States Conference (MSC) during the 1946 college football season. In their fourth season under head coach James J. Yeager, the Buffaloes compiled a 5–4–1 record (3–2–1 against MSC opponents), finishing tied for fourth place in the MSC. They were outscored by a total of 147 to 91.

End John Zisch and guard Gus Shannon were selected by the International News Service as first-team players on the 1946 All-Mountain States football team. Center Dean was named to the second team.

== Schedule ==
Date	Opponent	Site	Result	Attendance	Source
September 21	Iowa State*	Folsom Field; Boulder, CO	W 13–7	17,500	
September 28	at Texas*	War Memorial Stadium; Austin, TX	L 0–76	25,000	
October 5	Utah State	Folsom Field; Boulder, CO	W 6–0	9,200	
October 12	at Wyoming	Corbett Field; Laramie, WY	W 20–0	4,126	
October 19	at BYU	Cougar Stadium; Provo, UT	L 7–10	5,000	
October 26	New Mexico*^{†}	Folsom Field; Boulder, CO	W 14–13	17,000	
November 2	at Utah	Ute Stadium; Salt Lake City, UT (rivalry)	L 0–7	10,515	
November 9	at Missouri*	Memorial Stadium; Columbia, MO	L 0–21	6,000	
November 16	Denver	Folsom Field; Boulder, CO	T 13–13	21,000	
November 28	Colorado A&M	Folsom Field; Boulder, CO (rivalry)	W 18–0	9,000	
*Non-conference game; ^{†}Homecoming

== After the season ==
The 1947 NFL draft was held on December 16, 1946. The following Buffaloes were selected.

Round	Pick	Player	Position	NFL Club
21	190	Bob West	Back	Green Bay Packers
22	202	Maurice "Tex" Reilly	Back	Green Bay Packers
