= 1946 Detroit Titans football team =

American college football season

1946 Detroit Titans football
- Conference: Independent
- Record: 6–4
- Head coach: Chuck Baer (2nd season)
- Captains: Wilbur Hintz; Bob Ivory
- Home stadium: University of Detroit Stadium

1946 Midwestern major college football independents records
	Conf.			Overall
Team	W	L	T	W		L		T
No. 1 Notre Dame		–		8	–	0	–	1
Cincinnati		–		9	–	2	–	0
Detroit		–		6	–	4	–	0
Michigan State		–		5	–	5	–	0
Marquette		–		4	–	5	–	0
Rankings from AP Poll

The 1946 Detroit Titans football team was an American football team that represented the University of Detroit as an independent during the 1946 college football season. In their second season under head coach Chuck Baer, the Titans compiled a 6–4 record and outscored their opponents by a combined total of 214 to 134.

The team featured one of the top rushing offenses in the country. The Titans' backs tallied 2,632 rushing yards for the third highest total in the nation. Their average of 263.2 yards per game ranked fourth nationally. The team's backfield included halfbacks Bill Haley, Joe Wright, and Jack Kurkowski, quarterback Gene Malinowski, and fullbacks Al Schmidt and Len Rittof.

The team's assistant coaches were Lloyd Brazil (backfield coach and athletic director), John Shada (line coach), Ed J. Barbour (backfield coach), and Dr. Raymond D. Forsyth (team physician and trainer). End Wilbur Hintz and guard Bob Ivory were the team's co-captains.

Detroit was ranked at No. 61 in the final Litkenhous Difference by Score System rankings for 1946.

The team played its home games at University of Detroit Stadium, which had a capacity of 20,000 persons. In the fall of 1946, the university had an enrollment of 5,000 men and 1,200 women.

== Schedule ==
Date	Opponent	Site	Result	Attendance	Source
September 20	Wayne	University of Detroit Stadium; Detroit, MI	W 31–0	23,800	
September 27	Scranton	University of Detroit Stadium; Detroit, MI	W 32–13	18,650	
October 5	at Holy Cross	Fitton Field; Worcester, MA	L 14–16	20,000	
October 13	at San Francisco	Kezar Stadium; San Francisco, CA	W 18–6	20,000	
October 18	No. 20 Tulsa	University of Detroit Stadium; Detroit, MI	W 20–14	20,200	
October 25	Drake	University of Detroit Stadium; Detroit, MI	W 33–6	16,572	
November 1	Marquette	University of Detroit Stadium; Detroit, MI	L 20–21	10,350	
November 8	Villanova	University of Detroit Stadium; Detroit, MI	L 6–23	19,350	
November 17	at Saint Louis	Walsh Stadium; St. Louis, MO	W 33–14	8,712	
November 29	at Miami (FL)	Burdine Stadium; Miami, FL	L 7–21	24,747	
Rankings from AP Poll released prior to the game

== After the season ==
The 1947 NFL Draft was held on December 16, 1946. The following Titans were selected.

Round	Pick	Player	Position	NFL Club
9	67	Gene Malinowski	Back	Boston Yanks
11	86	Pete Sullivan	Tackle	Detroit Lions
17	148	Jack Hart	Tackle	Washington Redskins
28	256	Arch Kelly	End	Detroit Lions

== See also ==
- 1946 in Michigan
