= 1946 South Dakota Coyotes football team =

American college football season

1946 South Dakota Coyotes football
- Conference: North Central Conference
- Record: 2–4 (1–2 NCC)
- Head coach: Harry Gamage (9th season)
- Home stadium: Inman Field

1946 North Central Conference football standings
	Conf.					Overall
Team	W		L		T	W		L		T
Iowa State Teachers $	2	–	0	–	1	4	–	1	–	2
North Dakota Agricultural	4	–	1	–	0	5	–	3	–	0
South Dakota State	2	–	1	–	2	3	–	3	–	2
North Dakota	2	–	2	–	0	4	–	3	–	0
Morningside	2	–	3	–	1	3	–	5	–	1
South Dakota	1	–	2	–	0	2	–	4	–	0
Augustana (SD)	0	–	4	–	0	0	–	6	–	1
$ – Conference champion

The 1946 South Dakota Coyotes football team was an American football team that represented the University of South Dakota as a member of the North Central Conference (NCC) during the 1946 college football season. In their ninth season under head coach Harry Gamage, the Coyotes compiled a 2–4 record (1–2 against NCC opponents), finished in sixth place out of seven teams in the NCC, and were outscored by a total of 106 to 38. They played their home games at Inman Field in Vermillion, South Dakota.

== Schedule ==
Date	Opponent	Site	Result	Attendance	Source
September 28	Yankton*	Inman Field; Vermillion, SD	W 19–13		
October 5	Wayne State (NE)*	Inman Field; Vermillion, SD	L 0–12		
October 11	at North Dakota	Memorial Stadium; Grand Forks, ND	L 6–21		
October 19	at Morningside	Sioux City, IA	W 6–0	6,000	
October 26	South Dakota State^{†}	Inman Field; Vermillion, SD	L 0–20	6,000	
November 2	at Saint Louis*	Walsh Stadium; St. Louis, MO	L 7–41	3,337	
*Non-conference game; ^{†}Homecoming
