= 1946 Utah Utes football team =

American college football season

1946 Utah Utes football

Pineapple Bowl, L 16–19 at Hawaii
- Conference: Mountain States Conference
- Record: 8–3 (4–2 MSC)
- Head coach: Ike Armstrong (22nd season)
- Home stadium: Ute Stadium

1946 Mountain States Conference football standings
| | Conf. | | | | | Overall |
| Team | W | | L | | T | W | | L | | T |
|---|---|---|---|---|---|---|---|---|---|---|
| Utah State $ | 4 | – | 1 | – | 1 | 7 | – | 2 | – | 1 |
| Denver $ | 4 | – | 1 | – | 1 | 5 | – | 5 | – | 1 |
| Utah | 4 | – | 2 | – | 0 | 8 | – | 3 | – | 0 |
| Colorado | 3 | – | 2 | – | 1 | 5 | – | 4 | – | 1 |
| BYU | 3 | – | 2 | – | 1 | 5 | – | 4 | – | 1 |
| Colorado A&M | 1 | – | 5 | – | 0 | 2 | – | 7 | – | 0 |
| Wyoming | 0 | – | 6 | – | 0 | 1 | – | 8 | – | 1 |
$ – Conference champion

The 1946 Utah Utes football team, or also commonly known as the Utah Redskins, was an American football team that represented the University of Utah as a member of the Mountain States Conference (MSC) during the 1946 college football season. In their 22nd season under head coach Ike Armstrong, the Utes compiled an overall record of 8–3 record with a mark of 4–2 against conference opponents, finished in third place in the MSC, and outscored all opponents by a total of 257 to 114. Utah was invited to the Pineapple Bowl, where they lost to Hawaii.

The team ranked third nationally in rushing offense, averaging 263.5 rushing yards per game. Barney Hafen led Utah's ground attack and ranked 20th nationally with 577 rushing yards.

Backs Milton Smith and C. Parkinson were selected by the International News Service as first-team players on the 1946 All-Mountain States football team. Ends Van Sandt and Stevens and guard Barrett were named to the second team.

Utah was ranked at No. 93 in the final Litkenhous Difference by Score System rankings for 1946.

== Schedule ==
| Date | Opponent | Site | Result | Attendance | Source |
|---|---|---|---|---|---|
| September 28 | New Mexico* | Ute Stadium; Salt Lake City, UT | W 56–14 | 19,571 | |
| October 5 | Arizona* | Ute Stadium; Salt Lake City, UT | W 14–7 | 18,000 | |
| October 12 | at BYU | Old Cougar Stadium; Provo, UT (rivalry) | W 35–6 | 12,500 | |
| October 19 | at Denver | DU Stadium; Denver, CO | L 14–20 | 25,600 | |
| October 26 | Wyoming | Ute Stadium; Salt Lake City, UT | W 27–7 | 9,354 | |
| November 2 | Colorado^{†} | Ute Stadium; Salt Lake City, UT (rivalry) | W 7–0 | 10,515 | |
| November 9 | at Colorado A&M | Colorado Field; Fort Collins, CO | W 13–0 | 1,750 | |
| November 16 | at San Francisco* | Kezar Stadium; San Francisco, CA | W 21–13 | 5,000 | |
| November 28 | Utah State | Ute Stadium; Salt Lake City, UT (rivalry) | L 14–22 | 23,166 | |
| December 25 | at Hawaii All-Stars* | Honolulu Stadium; Honolulu, Territory of Hawaii | W 40–6 | 6,000 | |
| January 1 | at Hawaii* | Honolulu Stadium; Honolulu, Territory of Hawaii (Pineapple Bowl) | L 16–19 | 20,000 | |
*Non-conference game; ^{†}Homecoming

== NFL draft ==
Utah had one player selected in the 1947 NFL draft.

| Player | Position | Round | Pick | NFL club |
| Ralph Olsen | Defensive end | 32 | 297 | Green Bay Packers |
