= 1946 North Dakota Agricultural Bison football team =

American college football season

1946 North Dakota Agricultural Bison football
- Conference: North Central Conference
- Record: 5–3 (4–1 NCC)
- Head coach: Stan Kostka (2nd season)
- Home stadium: Dacotah Field

1946 North Central Conference football standings
	Conf.					Overall
Team	W		L		T	W		L		T
Iowa State Teachers $	2	–	0	–	1	4	–	1	–	2
North Dakota Agricultural	4	–	1	–	0	5	–	3	–	0
South Dakota State	2	–	1	–	2	3	–	3	–	2
North Dakota	2	–	2	–	0	4	–	3	–	0
Morningside	2	–	3	–	1	3	–	5	–	1
South Dakota	1	–	2	–	0	2	–	4	–	0
Augustana (SD)	0	–	4	–	0	0	–	6	–	1
$ – Conference champion

The 1946 North Dakota Agricultural Bison football team was an American football team that represented North Dakota Agricultural College (now known as North Dakota State University) in the North Central Conference (NCC) during the 1946 college football season. In its second season under head coach Stan Kostka, the team compiled a 5–3 record (4–1 against NCC opponents) and finished in second place out of seven teams the NCC. The team played its home games at Dacotah Field in Fargo, North Dakota.

== Schedule ==
Date	Opponent	Site	Result	Attendance	Source
September 21	at Iowa	Iowa Stadium; Iowa City, IA	L 0–39		
September 27	Concordia–Moorhead*	Dacotah Field; Fargo, ND	W 26–6		
October 4	Morningside	Dacotah Field; Fargo, ND	W 32–7		
October 12	South Dakota State	Dacotah Field; Fargo, ND (rivalry)	W 6–0		
October 19	at North Dakota	Memorial Stadium; Grand Forks, ND (Nickel Trophy)	W 31–0	8,000	
October 25	Augustana (SD)	Dacotah Field; Fargo, ND	W 32–0		
November 2	at Iowa State Teachers	O. R. Latham Stadium; Cedar Falls, IA	L 0–21	4,000	
November 16	at Montana State*	Gatton Field; Bozeman, MT	L 18–39		
*Non-conference game
