= 1944 Arizona State–Flagstaff Lumberjacks football team =

American college football season

1944 Arizona State–Flagstaff Lumberjacks football
- Conference: Border Conference
- Record: 2–2 (0–0 Border)
- Head coach: Frank Brickey (2nd season)
- Home stadium: Skidmore Field

1944 Border Conference football standings
| | Conf. | | | | | Overall |
| Team | W | | L | | T | W | | L | | T |
|---|---|---|---|---|---|---|---|---|---|---|
| Texas Tech | 2 | – | 0 | – | 0 | 4 | – | 7 | – | 0 |
| West Texas State | 1 | – | 1 | – | 0 | 4 | – | 3 | – | 0 |
| New Mexico | 0 | – | 2 | – | 0 | 1 | – | 7 | – | 0 |
| Arizona State–Flagstaff | 0 | – | 0 | – | 0 | 2 | – | 2 | – | 0 |
$ – Conference champion

The 1944 Arizona State–Flagstaff Lumberjacks football team represented Arizona State Teachers College at Flagstaff (now known as Northern Arizona University) as a member of the Border Conference during the 1944 college football season. Led by second-year head coach Frank Brickey, the Lumberjacks compiled an overall record of 2–2, with a conference record of 0–0, and finished fourth in the Border.

== Schedule ==
| Date | Opponent | Site | Result | Source |
|---|---|---|---|---|
| September 23 | at New Mexico | Hilltop Stadium; Albuquerque, NM | L 14–47 | |
| September 30 | Tonopah Army Air Field* | Skidmore Field; Flagstaff, AZ | W 13–0 | |
| October 8 | vs. Nevada* | Butcher Memorial Field; Las Vegas, NV | L 6–25 | |
| October 14 | Compton* | Skidmore Field; Flagstaff, AZ | W 20–13 | |
*Non-conference game
