= Dick Romney =

American athlete and sports coach (1895–1969)

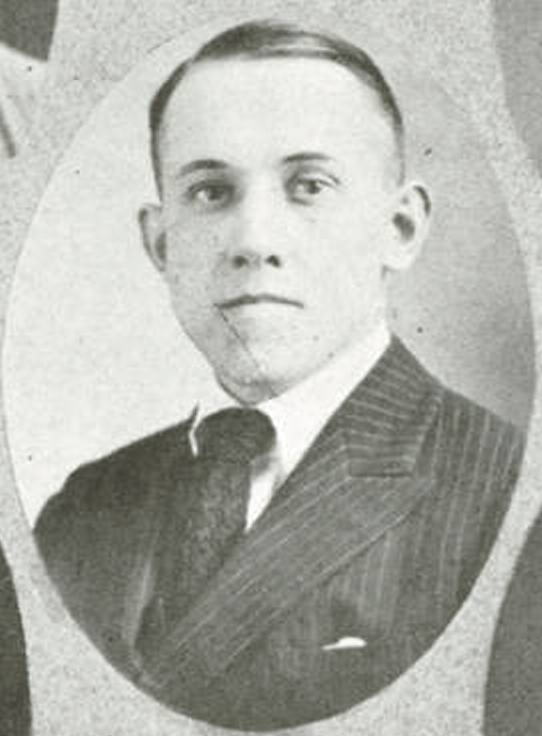
- Romney pictured in Buzzer 1921, Utah Agricultural yearbook

Biographical details
- Born: February 12, 1895; Salt Lake City, Utah, U.S.
- Died: February 5, 1969 (aged 73); Salt Lake City, Utah, U.S.

Playing career
- 1914–1916: Utah

Coaching career (HC unless noted)

Football
- 1919–1948: Utah Agricultural

Basketball
- 1919–1941: Utah Agricultural

Administrative career (AD unless noted)
- 1919–1948: Utah Agricultural
- 1949–1960: Skyline Six / Skyline (comm.)

Head coaching record
- Overall: 128–91–16 (football); 224–158 (basketball)
- Bowls: 0–1

Accomplishments and honors

Championships
- Football; 3 RMC (1921, 1935–1936); 1 MSC (1946)
- College Football Hall of Fame; Inducted in 1954 (profile)

Ernest Lowell "Dick" Romney (February 12, 1895 – February 5, 1969) was an American football, basketball and baseball player and coach, track athlete, and college athletics administrator. He served as the head football coach and athletic director at the Agricultural College of Utah, now Utah State University, from 1918 to 1949, compiling a career college football record of 128–91–16. Romney was also the head basketball coach at Utah Agricultural from 1919 to 1941, tallying a college basketball mark of 224–158. He is one of only two coaches in NCAA history who have coached in both a postseason football game and the NCAA basketball tournament. He served as the commissioner of the Skyline Conference from 1949 to 1960. Romney was inducted into the College Football Hall of Fame as a coach in 1954 and was elected to the Helms Athletic Foundation and Hall of Fame as a football coach in 1958.

== Early life, family, and playing career ==
Romney was born in Salt Lake City to George Romney and Hannah Ottinger Romney. "Dick" was a nickname given to him by his mother. He married Elizabeth ("Beth") Horlick of Salt Lake City in 1917.

He graduated from the University of Utah where he lettered in football (playing as a running back), basketball, baseball, and track. He was a member of the A.A.U. national championship basketball team of 1916. In 1916, he was chosen by the Helms Foundation as an All-American Collegiate and A.A.U. Basketball player.

As a member of the U.S. Army's 362nd Infantry, Romney played halfback for the Fort Lewis football team, scoring the only touchdown in a loss to Mare Island's team in the wartime 1918 Rose Bowl.

Romney's brothers—G. Ottinger "Ott" Romney, W. W. "Woody" Romney, Milton "Mitt" Romney and Floyd Romney—were all gifted athletes and four were coaches. Ott coached the champion 'Golden Bobcats' (Basketball, 1928) at Montana State Agricultural College, now Montana State University, Bozeman. Floyd played football for Ott at Montana State, and went on to a long coaching career at East High School in Salt Lake City, Utah. Mitt played college football at Utah and Chicago as a quarterback and later coached at Texas and for the Racine Cardinals. From 1925 to 1928, Mitt was a quarterback for the Chicago Bears of the NFL. Mitt Romney is a first cousin to former Governor George Romney of Michigan, and his son, Mitt Romney of Massachusetts, was named for him.

== Coaching career ==
Between 1925 and 1948, Romney organized and operated a summer school for football and basketball coaches that he ran in Logan, Utah. Noteworthy football speakers included Knute Rockne, Pop Warner, Pappy Waldorf, Fritz Crisler, Clark Schaunnessy and Henry Frankel. Basketball greats presented at Romney's clinics.

== Later years and honors ==
A new football stadium built in 1968 (replacing an earlier facility built in 1927, also named for him) at Utah State University was renamed Romney Stadium. Romney Stadium honored the Hall of Fame coach from 1969 to 2015, when it was renamed for a corporate sponsor.

On February 5, 1969, Romney died from a heart attack at his home in Salt Lake City, one week before his 74th birthday, at the age of 73.

== Head coaching record ==
=== Football ===
Year	Team	Overall	Conference	Standing	Bowl/playoffs
Utah Agricultural/State Aggies (Rocky Mountain Conference) (1919–1937)
1919	Utah Agricultural	5–2	2–2	T–4th	
1920	Utah Agricultural	4–2–1	2–1	4th	
1921	Utah Agricultural	7–1	3–0	1st	
1922	Utah Agricultural	5–4	3–3	T–5th	
1923	Utah Agricultural	5–2	4–2	4th	
1924	Utah Agricultural	4–2–1	3–2–1	T–2nd	
1925	Utah Agricultural	6–1	5–1	T–2nd	
1926	Utah Agricultural	5–1–2	4–1–2	3rd	
1927	Utah Agricultural	3–4–1	3–3	7th	
1928	Utah Agricultural	5–3–1	4–2–1	4th	
1929	Utah State	3–4	3–4	9th	
1930	Utah State	3–5–1	3–4–1	8th	
1931	Utah State	6–2	5–2	2nd	
1932	Utah State	4–4	3–3	T–6th	
1933	Utah State	4–4	4–3	6th	
1934	Utah State	5–1–1	5–1–1	4th	
1935	Utah State	5–2–1	5–1–1	T–1st	
1936	Utah State	7–0–1	6–0–1	1st	
1937	Utah State	2–4–2	2–4–1	T–7th	
Utah State Aggies (Mountain States / Skyline Six Conference) (1938–1948)
1938	Utah State	4–4	3–3	5th	
1939	Utah State	3–4–1	2–3–1	5th	
1940	Utah State	2–5–1	2–4	5th	
1941	Utah State	0–8	0–6	7th	
1942	Utah State	6–3–1	2–3–1	4th	
1943	No team—World War II				
1944	Utah State	3–3	0–2	4th	
1945	Utah State	4–3	1–3	4th	
1946	Utah State	7–2–1	4–1–1	T–1st	L Raisin
1947	Utah State	6–5	3–3	T–3rd	L Grape
1948	Utah State	5–6	2–4	T–2nd	
Utah State:		128–91–16	88–71–12		
Total:		128–91–16			
National championship Conference title Conference division title or championship game berth

=== Basketball ===
Record table
Season	Team	Overall	Conference	Standing	Postseason
Utah Agricultural (Independent) (1919–1923)
1919–20	Utah Agricultural	2–0			
1920–21	Utah Agricultural	6–4			
1921–22	Utah Agricultural	8–3			
1922–23	Utah Agricultural	8–4			
Utah Agricultural (Mountain States Conference) (1923–1941)
1923–24	Utah Agricultural	6–6	3–5	2nd	
1924–25	Utah Agricultural	12–7	5–5	T–2nd	
1925–26	Utah Agricultural	13–5	8–4	1st	
1926–27	Utah Agricultural	11–3	9–3	2nd	
1927–28	Utah Agricultural	7–7	5–7	2nd	
1928–29	Utah Agricultural	8–10	4–8	3rd	
1929–30	Utah Agricultural	15–7	7–5	T–1st	
1930–31	Utah Agricultural	13–7	7–5	T–2nd	
1931–32	Utah Agricultural	7–15	2–10	4th	
1932–33	Utah Agricultural	10–12	4–8	3rd	
1933–34	Utah Agricultural	14–6	7–5	T–2nd	
1934–35	Utah Agricultural	17–5	9–3	1st	
1935–36	Utah Agricultural	17–9	9–3	1st	
1936–37	Utah Agricultural	6–9	5–7	T–3rd	
1937–38	Utah Agricultural	11–9	6–6	4th	
1938–39	Utah Agricultural	17–7	8–4	2nd	NCAA Regional Third Place
1939–40	Utah Agricultural	11–7	7–5	T–3rd	
1940–41	Utah Agricultural	5–16	2–10	7th	
Utah Agricultural:		224–158 (.586)	107–103 (.510)		
Total:		224–158 (.586)			
National champion Postseason invitational champion Conference regular season champion Conference regular season and conference tournament champion Division regular season champion Division regular season and conference tournament champion Conference tournament champion
