= 1946 Arizona State–Flagstaff Lumberjacks football team =

American college football season

1946 Arizona State–Flagstaff Lumberjacks football
- Conference: Border Conference
- Record: 5–2–2 (1–2–1 Border)
- Head coach: Frank Brickey (4th season)
- Home stadium: Skidmore Field

1946 Border Conference football standings
	Conf.					Overall
Team	W		L		T	W		L		T
Hardin–Simmons $	6	–	0	–	0	11	–	0	–	0
Texas Tech	3	–	1	–	0	8	–	3	–	0
New Mexico	4	–	2	–	1	5	–	5	–	2
Arizona	2	–	2	–	1	4	–	4	–	2
West Texas State	3	–	4	–	0	5	–	5	–	0
Arizona State–Flagstaff	1	–	2	–	1	5	–	2	–	2
Texas Mines	2	–	4	–	0	3	–	6	–	0
Arizona State	1	–	4	–	1	2	–	7	–	2
New Mexico A&M	1	–	4	–	0	4	–	5	–	0
$ – Conference champion

The 1946 Arizona State–Flagstaff Lumberjacks football team was an American football team that represented Arizona State College at Flagstaff (now known as Northern Arizona University) in the Border Conference during the 1946 college football season. In their fourth and final year under head coach Frank Brickey, the team compiled a 5–2–2 record (1–2–1 against conference opponents), outscored opponents by a total of 130 to 70, and finished in sixth place out of nine teams in the Border Conference.

The team played its home games at Skidmore Field in Flagstaff, Arizona.

== Schedule ==
Date	Opponent	Site	Result	Attendance	Source
September 14	Williams Field*	Skidmore Field; Flagstaff, AZ	W 6–0		
September 21	at New Mexico	Lobo Stadium; Albuquerque, NM	L 7–12	10,000	
September 28	Western New Mexico*	Skidmore Field; Flagstaff, AZ	W 32–0		
October 5	at Fresno State JV*	Fresno, CA	T 6–6		
October 19	New Mexico A&M^{†}	Skidmore Field; Flagstaff, AZ	W 14–6		
October 27	vs. Western State (CO)*	Pueblo, CO	W 19–6		
November 1	at West Texas State	Buffalo Stadium; Canyon, TX	L 0–20		
November 8	vs. Eastern New Mexico*	Clovis, NM	W 33–7		
November 16	at Arizona State	Goodwin Stadium; Tempe, AZ	T 13–13		
*Non-conference game; ^{†}Homecoming
