= Duncan Unified School District =

School district in Arizona, United States

Address
- 108 Stadium Avenue Duncan, Arizona, 85534; United States

District information
- Type: Public
- Grades: PreK–12
- NCES District ID: 0402600

Students and staff
- Students: 374
- Teachers: 19.88
- Staff: 37.36
- Student–teacher ratio: 18.81

Other information
- Website: dusdwildkats.org

Duncan Unified School District 2 is a school district in Greenlee County, Arizona. It is the school district for Duncan High School and Duncan Elementary.
