= 1946 New Mexico Lobos football team =

American college football season

1946 New Mexico Lobos football

Harbor Bowl, T 13–13 vs. Montana State
- Conference: Border Conference
- Record: 5–5–2 (4–2–1 Border)
- Head coach: Willis Barnes (5th season)
- Home stadium: Zimmerman Field

1946 Border Conference football standings
	Conf.					Overall
Team	W		L		T	W		L		T
Hardin–Simmons $	6	–	0	–	0	11	–	0	–	0
Texas Tech	3	–	1	–	0	8	–	3	–	0
New Mexico	4	–	2	–	1	5	–	5	–	2
Arizona	2	–	2	–	1	4	–	4	–	2
West Texas State	3	–	4	–	0	5	–	5	–	0
Arizona State–Flagstaff	1	–	2	–	1	5	–	2	–	2
Texas Mines	2	–	4	–	0	3	–	6	–	0
Arizona State	1	–	4	–	1	2	–	7	–	2
New Mexico A&M	1	–	4	–	0	4	–	5	–	0
$ – Conference champion

The 1946 New Mexico Lobos football team represented the University of New Mexico in the Border Conference during the 1946 college football season. In their fifth and final season under head coach Willis Barnes, the Lobos compiled a 5–5–2 record (4–2–1 against conference opponents), finished third in the Border Conference, tied with Montana State in the 1947 Harbor Bowl, and were outscored by opponents by a total of 224 to 127.

At a ceremony held on November 16, 1946, the athletic field was renamed Zimmerman Field in honor of James F. Zimmerman, who was president of the University from 1927 to 1944.

== Schedule ==
Date	Opponent	Site	Result	Attendance	Source
September 21	Arizona State–Flagstaff	Lobo Stadium; Albuquerque, NM	W 12–7	10,000	
September 28	at Utah*	Ute Stadium; Salt Lake City, UT	L 14–56	19,571	
October 4	West Texas State	Lobo Stadium; Albuquerque, NM	W 6–0	7,000	
October 12	at New Mexico A&M	Quesenberry Field; Las Cruces, NM (rivalry)	W 7–6	6,500	
October 18	Hardin-Simmons	Lobo Stadium; Albuquerque, NM	L 0–49		
October 26	at Colorado*	Folsom Field; Boulder, CO	L 13–14	17,000	
November 2	Texas Mines	Lobo Stadium; Albuquerque, NM	W 21–13	7,000	
November 9	Texas Tech	Lobo Stadium; Albuquerque, NM	L 0–27	8,000	
November 16	Arizona^{†}	Zimmerman Field; Albuquerque, NM (rivalry)	T 13–13	8,000	
November 23	Kansas State*	Zimmerman Field; Albuquerque, NM	W 14–7	7,000	
December 22	at Leilehua Alumni*	Honolulu Stadium; Honolulu, HI	L 14–19	8,000	
January 1, 1947	vs. Montana State*	Balboa Stadium; San Diego, CA (Harbor Bowl)	T 13–13	7,000	
*Non-conference game; ^{†}Homecoming
