= 1946 Rocky Mountain Conference football season =

American college football season

Rocky Mountain Conference
- Sport: Football
- Teams: 5
- Champion: Montana State

Football seasons
- 1945 1947

1946 Rocky Mountain Conference football standings
	Conf.					Overall
Team	W		L		T	W		L		T
Montana State $	2	–	0	–	1	5	–	3	–	2
Colorado State–Greeley	3	–	1	–	0	6	–	3	–	0
Western State (CO)	1	–	1	–	0	5	–	4	–	1
Colorado College	0	–	1	–	1	4	–	4	–	1
Colorado Mines	0	–	3	–	0	1	–	4	–	1
$ – Conference champion

The 1946 Rocky Mountain Conference football season was the season of college football played by the five member schools of the Rocky Mountain Conference (RMC) as part of the 1946 college football season.

The Montana State Bobcats won the RMC championship with a 5–3–2 record (2–0–1 against conference opponents) and outscored opponents by a total of 198 to 156.

== Conference overview ==
Conf. rank	Team	Head coach	Conf. record	Overall record	Points scored	Points against
1	Montana State	Clyde Carpenter	2–0–1	5–3–2	198	156
2	Colorado State–Greeley	John W. Hancock	3–1	6–3	218	101
3	Western State (CO)	Paul W. Wright	1–1	5–4–1	142	96
4	Colorado College	Harold A. White	0-1–1	4–4–1	131	106
5	Colorado Mines	John Mason	0–3	1–4–1	62	132

== Teams ==
=== Montana State ===
1946 Montana State Bobcats football

RMC champion

Harbor Bowl, T 13–13 vs. New Mexico
- Conference: Rocky Mountain Conference
- Record: 5–3–2 (2–0–1 RMC)
- Head coach: Clyde Carpenter (1st season)
- Home stadium: Gatton Field

The 1946 Montana State Bobcats football team represented Montana State College (now known as Montana State University) of Bozeman, Montana. In their first season under head coach Clyde Carpenter, the Bobcats compiled a 5–3–2 record (2–0–1 against RMC opponents), won the RMC championship, and outscored opponents by a total of 198 to 156.

Players receiving all-conference honors were end Mike McCormick, tackle Len Larson, guard Dick Ball, and backs Bill Nelson and Neil Brooks. Tackle John McLellan was selected by the Chicago Bearsin the 19th round (175th pick) of the 1947 NFL draft.

Date	Opponent	Site	Result	Attendance	Source
September 28	BYU*	Gatton Field; Bozeman, MT	W 13–12	3,000	
October 5	at Colorado College	Washburn Field; Colorado Springs, CO	T 7–7		
October 12	at Utah State*	Logan, UT	L 14–28	5,000	
October 19	vs. Montana*	Naranche Memorial Stadium; Butte, MT (rivalry)	L 7–20	10,000	
October 26	Colorado State–Greeley	Gatton Field; Bozeman, MT	W 27–7		
November 2	at Nevada*	Mackay Stadium; Reno, NV	L 14–38		
November 9	vs. Portland*	Memorial Stadium; Great Falls, MT	W 19–6	6,000	
November 16	North Dakota Agricultural*	Gatton Field; Bozeman, MT	W 39–18		
November 23	at Colorado Mines	Golden, CO	W 45–7		
January 1, 1947	vs. New Mexico*	Balboa Stadium; San Diego, CA (Harbor Bowl)	T 13–13	7,000	
*Non-conference game

=== Colorado State–Greeley ===
1946 Colorado State–Greeley Bears football
- Conference: Rocky Mountain Conference
- Record: 6–3 (3–1 RMC)
- Head coach: John W. Hancock (13th season)

The 1946 Colorado State–Greeley Bears football team represented Colorado State College at Greeley, Colorado (now known as the University of Northern Colorado). In their 13th season under head coach John W. Hancock, the Bears compiled a 6–3 record (3–1 against RMC opponents), finished in second place in the RMC, and outscored opponents by a total of 218 to 101.

Date	Opponent	Site	Result	Attendance	Source
September 21	at Wyoming*	Corbett Field; Laramie, WY	L 0–7		
September 28	at Chadron State*	Elliott Field; Chadron, NE	W 46–8		
October 4	Colorado Mines	Greeley, CO	W 21–0		
October 12	Western State (CO)	Greeley, CO	W 12–6		
October 19	Emporia State*	Greeley, CO	W 41–21		
October 26	Montana State	Gatton Field; Bozeman, MT	L 7–27		
November 2	South Dakota Mines*	Greeley, CO	W 65–0		
November 9	Colorado College	Colorado Springs, CO	W 19–12	2,000	
November 16	at New Mexico A&M*	Quesenberry Field; Las Cruces, NM	L 7–12	3,500	
*Non-conference game

=== Western State ===
1946 Western State Mountaineers football
- Conference: Rocky Mountain Conference
- Record: 5–4–1 (1–1 RMC)
- Head coach: Paul W. Wright

The 1946 Western State Mountaineers football team represented Western State College of Colorado at Gunnison, Colorado (now known as the Western Colorado University). Led by head coach Paul W. Wright, the Bears compiled a 5–4–1 record (1–1 against RMC opponents), finished in third place in the RMC, and outscored opponents by a total of 142 to 96.

The 1946 season was the first for the Western State football program since 1941. The sport was abandoned after the 1941 season due to World War II.

Date	Opponent	Site	Result	Source
September 22	at BYU	Provo, UT	L 2–13	
September 27	at Southwestern Tech*	Milam Stadium; Weatherford, OK	L 0–19	
October 5	Hastings*	Gunnison, CO	W 19–7	
October 12	at Colorado State–Greeley	Greeley, CO	L 6–12	
October 19	Colorado Mines	Gunnison, CO	W 19–7	
October 27	Arizona State–Flagstaff*	Pueblo, CO	L 6–19	
November 2	Chadron State*	Gunnison, CO	W 38–0	
November 9	at Adams State*	Alamosa, CO	W 33–6	
November 16	at Idaho Southern Branch*	Spud Bowl; Pocatello, ID	T 6–6	
*Non-conference game

=== Colorado College ===
1946 Colorado College Tigers football
- Conference: Rocky Mountain Conference
- Record: 4–4–1 (0–1–1 RMC)
- Head coach: Harold A. White

The 1946 Colorado College Tigers football team represented Colorado College of Colorado Springs, Colorado. Led by head coach Harold A. White, the Tigers compiled a 4–4–1 record (0–1–1 against RMC opponents), finished in fourth place in the RMC, and outscored opponents by a total of 131 to 106.

Date	Opponent	Site	Result	Attendance	Source
September 20	Peru State*	Washburn Field; Colorado Springs, CO	W 40–7		
September 28	Fort Hays State*	Washburn Field; Colorado Springs, CO	W 15–0	4,000	
October 5	Montana State	Washburn Field; Colorado Springs, CO	T 7–7		
October 12	West Texas State*	Buffalo Stadium; Canyon, TX	L 12–13		
October 19	Bradley*	Washburn Field; Colorado Springs, CO	L 0–20		
October 26	Colorado A&M*	Colorado Field; Fort Collins, CO	W 25–12	5,000	
November 9	Colorado State–Greeley^{†}	Colorado Springs, CO	L 12–19	2,000	
November 16	Grinnell*	Washburn Field; Colorado Springs, CO	W 14–0		
November 28	at Denver*	DU Stadium; Denver, CO	L 6–29	17,000	
*Non-conference game; ^{†}Homecoming

=== Colorado Mines ===
1946 Colorado Mines Orediggers football
- Conference: Rocky Mountain Conference
- Record: 1–4–1 (0–3 RMC)
- Head coach: John Mason (8th season)

The 1946 Colorado Mines Orediggers football team represented the Colorado School of Mines of Golden, Colorado. In their eighth year under head coach John Mason, the Orediggers compiled a 1–4–1 record (0–3 against RMC opponents), finished in last place in the RMC, and were outscored by a total of 132 to 62.

Date	Opponent	Site	Result	Attendance	Source
September 28	at Wyoming*	Corbett Field; Laramie, WY	T 7–7		
October 4	at Colorado State–Greeley	Greeley, CO	L 0–21		
October 12	at Emporia State*	Emporia, KS	L 6–26		
October 19	at Western State (CO)	Gunnison, CO	L 7–19		
November 16	Fort Hays State*	Golden, CO	W 35–14		
November 23	Montana State	Golden, CO	L 7–45		
*Non-conference game
