= List of New Mexico Lobos football seasons =

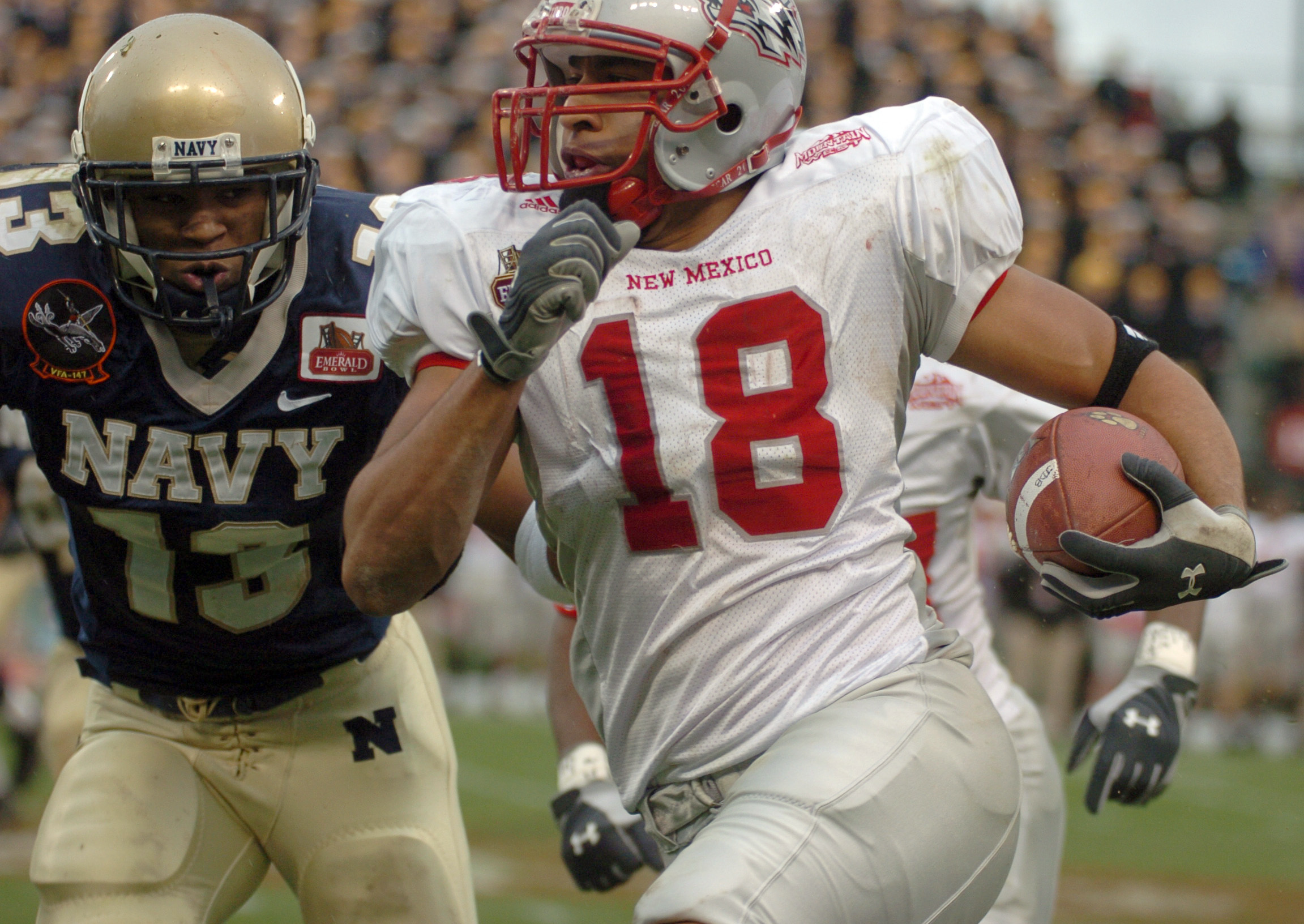
The Lobos in action against Navy

This is a list of New Mexico Lobos football seasons. The Lobos are part of the National Collegiate Athletic Association (NCAA) Division I Football Bowl Subdivision (FBS). Since their inception in 1892, the Lobos have played in over 1,100 games in over a century of play, including 13 bowl games, with interruptions occurring in 1895–1898, 1900 and 1902. They are a charter member of the Mountain West Conference (MWC), which they have been a part of since 1999. Prior to the Lobos joining the conference, they were a member of the Border Conference from 1931 to 1951, the Mountain States Conference (also known as the Skyline Conference) from 1952 to 1961, and the Western Athletic Conference (WAC) from 1962 to 1998. The Lobos have had brief spurts of success, with the Lobos having won four conference titles and two division titles.

== Seasons ==
| Year | Coach | Overall | Conference | Standing | Bowl/playoffs | Coaches^{#} | AP^{°} |
|---|---|---|---|---|---|---|---|
Independent (1892–1930)
| 1892 | No coach | 0–2 | | | | | |
| 1893 | No coach | 3–1 | | | | | |
| 1894 | W. A. Zimmer | 1–1–1 | | | | | |
| 1899 | No coach | 1–1 | | | | | |
| 1901 | Joe Napier | 0–3–1 | | | | | |
| 1903 | Walter McEwan | 3–0–1 | | | | | |
| 1904 | Walter McEwan | 1–0 | | | | | |
| 1905 | Martin F. Angell | 5–1–1 | | | | | |
| 1906 | Martin F. Angell | 3–1 | | | | | |
| 1907 | Martin F. Angell | 1–0 | | | | | |
| 1908 | Hermon H. Conwell | 5–1 | | | | | |
| 1909 | Sam P. McBirney | 4–2 | | | | | |
| 1910 | Carl Hamilton | 0–3 | | | | | |
| 1911 | Ralph Hutchinson | 1–3–1 | | | | | |
| 1912 | Ralph Hutchinson | 0–4 | | | | | |
| 1913 | Ralph Hutchinson | 3–2 | | | | | |
| 1914 | Ralph Hutchinson | 3–1–1 | | | | | |
| 1915 | Ralph Hutchinson | 3–1 | | | | | |
| 1916 | Ralph Hutchinson | 3–2 | | | | | |
| 1917 | Frank E. Wood | 1–2 | | | | | |
| 1919 | John F. McGough | 3–0–2 | | | | | |
| 1920 | Roy W. Johnson | 3–3 | | | | | |
| 1921 | Roy W. Johnson | 2–2 | | | | | |
| 1922 | Roy W. Johnson | 3–4 | | | | | |
| 1923 | Roy W. Johnson | 3–5 | | | | | |
| 1924 | Roy W. Johnson | 5–1 | | | | | |
| 1925 | Roy W. Johnson | 2–4–1 | | | | | |
| 1926 | Roy W. Johnson | 4–2–1 | | | | | |
| 1927 | Roy W. Johnson | 8–0–1 | | | | | |
| 1928 | Roy W. Johnson | 5–2–1 | | | | | |
| 1929 | Roy W. Johnson | 2–4–2 | | | | | |
| 1930 | Roy W. Johnson | 4–5 | | | | | |
New Mexico Lobos (Border Intercollegiate Athletic Association) (1931–1933)
| 1931 | Chuck Riley | 3–3–1 | 1–1–1 | T–2nd | | | |
| 1932 | Chuck Riley | 1–6–1 | 1–3–1 | 6th | | | |
| 1933 | Chuck Riley | 3–4–1 | 2–2 | 4th | | | |
| 1934 | Gwinn Henry | 8–1 | 3–1 | 2nd | | | |
| 1935 | Gwinn Henry | 6–4 | 3–2 | 3rd | | | |
| 1936 | Gwinn Henry | 2–7 | 1–4 | 7th | | | |
| 1937 | Ted Shipkey | 4–4–1 | 2–3–1 | 5th | | | |
| 1938 | Ted Shipkey | 8–3 | 4–2 | T–1st | L Sun | | |
| 1939 | Ted Shipkey | 8–2 | 4–2 | 2nd | | | |
| 1940 | Ted Shipkey | 5–4 | 4–2 | 4th | | | |
| 1941 | Ted Shipkey | 5–4–1 | 3–2–1 | 5th | | | |
| 1942 | Willis Barnes | 4–5–2 | 3–4 | 6th | | | |
| 1943 | Willis Barnes | 3–2 | | | L Sun | | |
| 1944 | Willis Barnes | 1–7 | | | | | |
| 1945 | Willis Barnes | 6–1–1 | | | W Sun | | |
| 1946 | Willis Barnes | 5–5–2 | 4–2–1 | 3rd | T Harbor | | |
| 1947 | Berl Huffman | 4–5–1 | 1–5–1 | 7th | | | |
| 1948 | Berl Huffman | 2–9 | 1–6 | 8th | | | |
| 1949 | Berl Huffman | 2–8 | 1–6 | 8th | | | |
| 1950 | Dudley DeGroot | 2–8 | 2–5 | 7th | | | |
New Mexico Lobos (Mountain States Conference / Skyline Conference) (1951–1962)
| 1951 | Dudley DeGroot | 4–7 | 2–4 | 7th | | | |
| 1952 | Dudley DeGroot | 7–2 | 5–1 | 2nd | | | |
| 1953 | Bob Titchenal | 5–3–1 | 3–2–1 | 4th | | | |
| 1954 | Bob Titchenal | 5–5 | 3–3 | T–4th | | | |
| 1955 | Bob Titchenal | 2–8 | 1–5 | 7th | | | |
| 1956 | Dick Clausen | 4–6 | 2–4 | 6th | | | |
| 1957 | Dick Clausen | 4–6 | 2–4 | 5th | | | |
| 1958 | Marv Levy | 7–3 | 5–1 | 2nd | | | |
| 1959 | Marv Levy | 7–3 | 4–2 | 3rd | | | |
| 1960 | Bill Weeks | 5–5 | 4–2 | 4th | | | |
| 1961 | Bill Weeks | 7–4 | 3–3 | T–3rd | W Aviation | | |
New Mexico Lobos (Western Athletic Conference) (1962–1999)
| 1962 | Bill Weeks | 7–2–1 | 2–1–1 | 1st | | | |
| 1963 | Bill Weeks | 6–4 | 3–1 | 1st | | | |
| 1964 | Bill Weeks | 9–2 | 3–1 | T–1st | | 16 | |
| 1965 | Bill Weeks | 3–7 | 2–3 | 4th | | | |
| 1966 | Bill Weeks | 2–8 | 0–5 | 6th | | | |
| 1967 | Bill Weeks | 1–9 | 0–5 | 6th | | | |
| 1968 | Rudy Feldman | 0–10 | 0–7 | 8th | | | |
| 1969 | Rudy Feldman | 4–6 | 1–5 | 7th | | | |
| 1970 | Rudy Feldman | 7–3 | 5–1 | 2nd | | | |
| 1971 | Rudy Feldman | 6–3–2 | 5–1 | 2nd | | | |
| 1972 | Rudy Feldman | 3–8 | 2–4 | 6th | | | |
| 1973 | Rudy Feldman | 4–7 | 3–4 | T–4th | | | |
| 1974 | Bill Mondt | 4–6–1 | 3–4 | T–4th | | | |
| 1975 | Bill Mondt | 6–5 | 4–3 | T–4th | | | |
| 1976 | Bill Mondt | 4–7 | 3–4 | T–5th | | | |
| 1977 | Bill Mondt | 5–7 | 2–5 | T–6th | | | |
| 1978 | Bill Mondt | 7–5 | 3–3 | 4th | | | |
| 1979 | Bill Mondt | 5–7 | 3–4 | T–5th | | | |
| 1980 | Joe Morrison | 4–7 | 3–4 | 6th | | | |
| 1981 | Joe Morrison | 4–7–1 | 3–4–1 | 5th | | | |
| 1982 | Joe Morrison | 10–1 | 6–1 | 2nd | | | |
| 1983 | Joe Lee Dunn | 6–6 | 4–3 | 4th | | | |
| 1984 | Joe Lee Dunn | 4–8 | 1–7 | T–8th | | | |
| 1985 | Joe Lee Dunn | 3–8 | 2–6 | 7th | | | |
| 1986 | Joe Lee Dunn | 4–8 | 2–5 | 7th | | | |
| 1987 | Mike Sheppard | 0–11 | 0–8 | 9th | | | |
| 1988 | Mike Sheppard | 2–10 | 1–7 | 8th | | | |
| 1989 | Mike Sheppard | 2–10 | 0–7 | 8th | | | |
| 1990 | Mike Sheppard | 2–10 | 1–6 | 8th | | | |
| 1991 | Mike Sheppard | 3–9 | 2–6 | T–8th | | | |
| 1992 | Dennis Franchione | 3–8 | 2–6 | 9th | | | |
| 1993 | Dennis Franchione | 6–5 | 4–4 | T–6th | | | |
| 1994 | Dennis Franchione | 5–7 | 4–4 | T–5th | | | |
| 1995 | Dennis Franchione | 4–7 | 2–6 | T–7th | | | |
| 1996 | Dennis Franchione | 6–5 | 3–5 | T–5th (Mountain) | | | |
| 1997 | Dennis Franchione | 9–4 | 6–2 | 1st (Mountain) | L Insight.com | | |
| 1998 | Rocky Long | 3–9 | 1–7 | 7th (Pacific) | | | |
New Mexico Lobos (Mountain West Conference) (1999–present)
| 1999 | Rocky Long | 4–7 | 3–4 | T–5th | | | |
| 2000 | Rocky Long | 5–7 | 3–4 | T–5th | | | |
| 2001 | Rocky Long | 6–5 | 4–3 | T–3rd | | | |
| 2002 | Rocky Long | 7–7 | 5–2 | 2nd | L Las Vegas | | |
| 2003 | Rocky Long | 8–5 | 5–2 | 2nd | L Las Vegas | | |
| 2004 | Rocky Long | 7–5 | 5–2 | 2nd | L Emerald | | |
| 2005 | Rocky Long | 6–5 | 4–4 | T–4th | | | |
| 2006 | Rocky Long | 6–7 | 4–4 | 5th | L New Mexico | | |
| 2007 | Rocky Long | 9–4 | 5–3 | T–3rd | W New Mexico | | |
| 2008 | Rocky Long | 4–8 | 2–6 | 7th | | | |
| 2009 | Mike Locksley | 1–11 | 1–7 | 8th | | | |
| 2010 | Mike Locksley | 1–11 | 1–7 | T–8th | | | |
| 2011 | Mike Locksley / George Barlow | 1–11 | 1–6 | T–6th | | | |
| 2012 | Bob Davie | 4–9 | 1–7 | T–9th | | | |
| 2013 | Bob Davie | 3–9 | 1–7 | 5th (Mountain) | | | |
| 2014 | Bob Davie | 4–8 | 2–6 | T–5th (Mountain) | | | |
| 2015 | Bob Davie | 7–6 | 5–3 | T–2nd (Mountain) | L New Mexico | | |
| 2016 | Bob Davie | 9–4 | 6–2 | T–1st (Mountain) | W New Mexico | | |
| 2017 | Bob Davie | 3–9 | 1–7 | 6th (Mountain) | | | |
| 2018 | Bob Davie | 3–9 | 1–7 | 6th (Mountain) | | | |
| 2019 | Bob Davie / Saga Tuitele | 2–10 | 0–8 | 6th (Mountain) | | | |
| 2020 | Danny Gonzales | 2–5 | 2–5 | T–7th | | | |
| 2021 | Danny Gonzales | 3–9 | 1–7 | 6th (Mountain) | | | |
| 2022 | Danny Gonzales | 2–10 | 0–8 | 6th (Mountain) | | | |
| 2023 | Danny Gonzales | 4–8 | 2–6 | 11th (Mountain) | | | |
| 2024 | Bronco Mendenhall | 5–7 | 3–4 | 8th (Mountain) | | | |
| 2025 | Jason Eck | 9-4 | 6-2 | T-1st | L Rate Bowl | | |
| Total: | | 503–633–31 (.439) | | | | | |
National championship Conference title Conference division title or championship game berth
^{#}Rankings from final Coaches Poll.
