= Barney McGarry =

American football player (1917–2001)

No. 30, 52
- Position: Guard

Personal information
- Born: December 24, 1917; Park City, Utah, U.S.
- Died: March 25, 2001 (aged 83); Provo, Utah, U.S.
- Listed height: 6 ft 1 in (1.85 m)
- Listed weight: 203 lb (92 kg)

Career information
- High school: Park City
- College: Utah (1935-1938)
- NFL draft: 1939: 6th round, 43rd overall pick

Career history
- Cleveland Rams (1939–1942)

Career NFL statistics
- Games played: 37
- Games started: 28
- Stats at Pro Football Reference

Bernard Duane McGarry (December 24, 1917 – March 25, 2001) was an American professional football guard. He played college football for the University of Utah and professional football for the Cleveland Rams.

== Early life ==
McGarry was born in Park City, Utah, in 1917. He attended the Park City Schools and was student body president and an all-state football player at Park City High School.

== University of Utah ==
McGarry enrolled at the University of Utah and played college football as a guard, tackle, and placekicker for Utah Utes. He was the captain of the 1938 Utah Utes football team that won the Mountain States Conference championship and defeated New Mexico in the 1939 Sun Bowl.

== Professional football ==
McGarry was drafted by the Cleveland Rams in the sixth round (43rd overall pick) of the 1939 NFL draft. In his first season with the Rams, McGarry played at running guard and regular guard. He described his first year in the NFL as follows:

It was swell. I've never seen anything like it, and I sure hope to play again next season. The games are a lot faster than college because the players know what the game is all about. The contests are tougher, but, aside from that, there is not much difference between pro and college games.

McGarry appeared in 37 NFL games, 28 as a starter, for the Rams from 1939 to 1942.

== Family and later years ==
McGarry was married in 1941 to Relva Johnson. After retiring from football, he worked as a floor coverings contractor. She died in 1980, and he married Margarett Bramwell in 1983. He died in 2001 at age 83 in Provo, Utah.
