= New Mexico Lobos football =

American college football team

2026 New Mexico Lobos football team
- First season: 1892; 134 years ago
- Athletic director: Ryan Berryman
- General manager: Beau Davidson
- Head coach: Jason Eck; 2nd season, 13–5 (.722)
- Location: Albuquerque, New Mexico
- Stadium: University Stadium (capacity: 39,224)
- NCAA division: Division I FBS
- Conference: Mountain West
- Colors: Cherry and silver
- All-time record: 503–633–31 (.444)
- Bowl record: 4–9–1 (.321)

Conference championships
- Border: 1938 WAC: 1962, 1963, 1964

Division championships
- WAC Mountain: 1997 MW Mountain: 2016
- Consensus All-Americans: 3
- Rivalries: Arizona (rivalry); New Mexico State (rivalry)

Uniforms
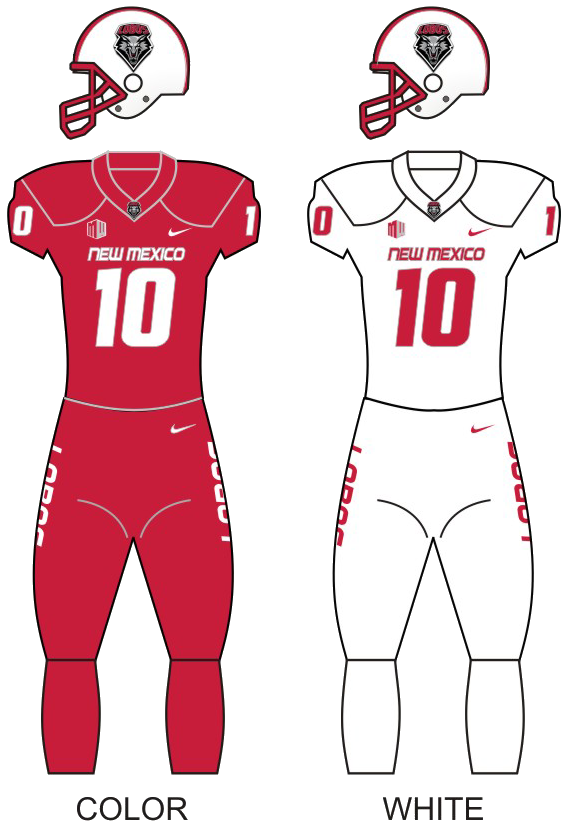
- Outfitter: Nike
- Website: GoLobos.com

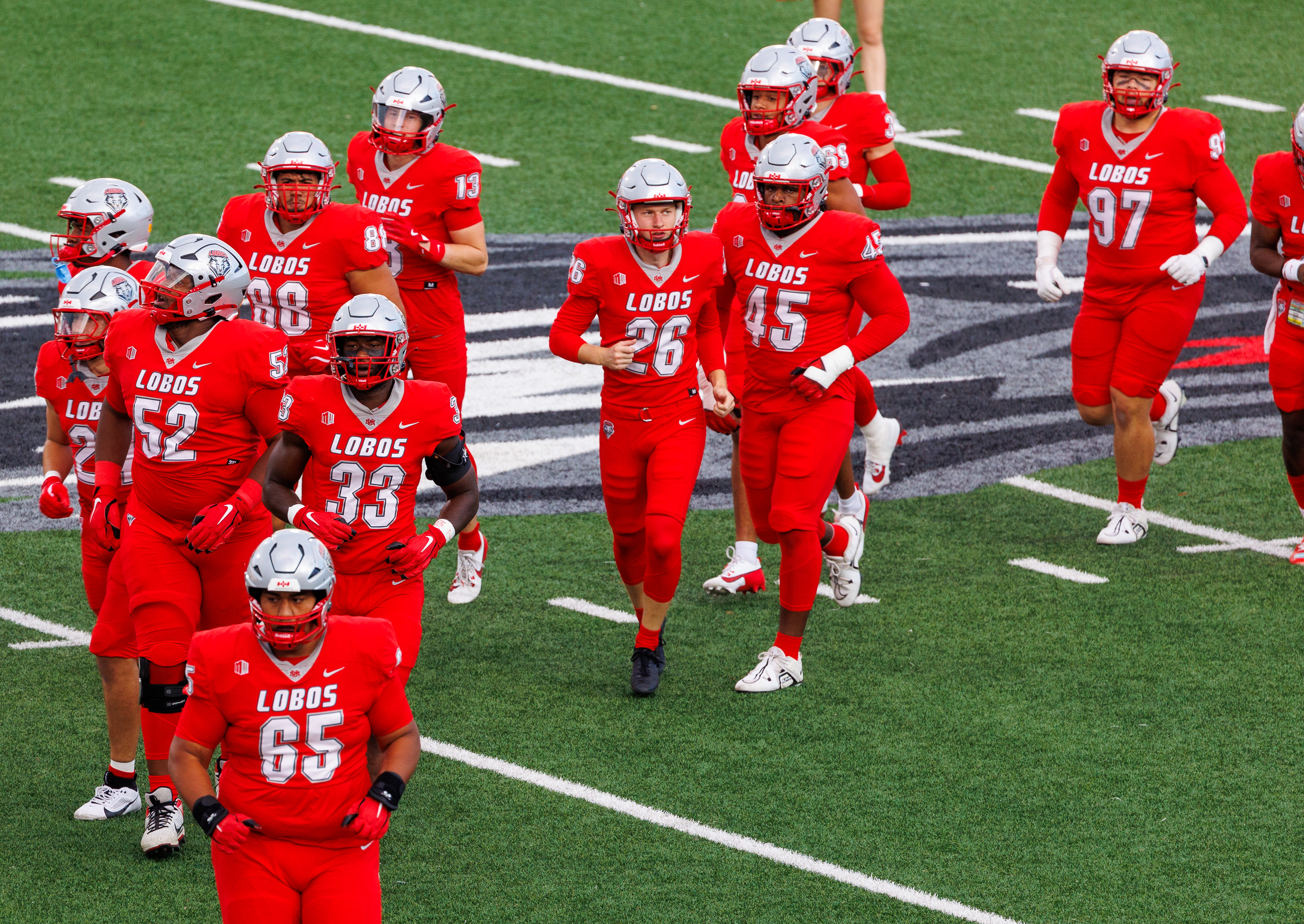
2024 Lobos players

The New Mexico Lobos football team is the intercollegiate football team at the University of New Mexico. The Lobos compete as a member of the Mountain West Conference. Their official colors are cherry and silver. The Lobos play their home games at University Stadium.

== History ==
=== Early history (1892–1959) ===
The first New Mexico Lobos football team took the field in 1892. The team didn't have a head coach from 1892 to 1893 and in 1899. The Lobos didn't field a football team from 1895 to 1898, 1900 and 1902. Ralph Hutchinson served as the Lobos head coach from 1911 to 1916, who compiled yearly records of 0–5, 3–3, 3–1–2 4–1 and 4–2 in that span.

From 1920 to 1930, the Lobos were coached by Roy Johnson, who is credited with building the first athletics facilities on campus for the Lobos throughout the 1920s. Chuck Riley became the head football coach for the New Mexico Lobos and remained there for three years, but posted a disappointing record of 7–13–3. Under head coach Gwinn Henry, the Lobos posted an 8–1 record in 1934. But they fell off in the next two seasons, posting records of 6–4 in 1935 and 2–7 in 1936. Henry was replaced after 1936.

Under head coach Ted Shipkey, who was hired to succeed Henry, the Lobos posted yearly records of 4–4–1, 8–3, 8–2, 5–4, and 5–4–1 from 1937 to 1941. Shipkey resigned after five seasons as head coach. The 1938 season was capped with a 26–0 loss in the 1939 Sun Bowl to Utah. Overall, New Mexico was held to 59 yards passing, and was intercepted four times. Furthermore, they were unable to cross Utah's 40-yard line during the entire game. Utah, on the other hand, racked up 366 yards rushing, and outgained the Lobos 384–212.

From 1942 to 1946, the Lobos were led by head coach Willis Barnes, and they posted records of 4–5–2, 1–7, 6–1–1 and 5–5–2 in that span. Barnes' 1945 team won the Sun Bowl and his 1946 team tied in the Harbor Bowl. His final record at UNM is 16–18–5. Barnes resigned after five seasons. As the head football coach at UNM, Berl Huffman struggled to find success on the football field. His three-year tenure produced a record of 8–22–1 that included no winning seasons. The Lobos' best season under his watch was a 4–5 mark in 1947. Huffman was fired after three seasons. Dudley DeGroot, previously head football coach at West Virginia, was hired to take over the Lobos football program after Huffman's firing. Under DeGroot's watch, the Lobos compiled a record of 13–17 in three seasons, which saw the Lobos' fortunes improve on the field. DeGroot saw how limited his talents were and decided to concentrate and gamble on an all-out defense. Every facet of defense DeGroot had coached over 30 years came into being at practices. A dedicated and aggressive defense devised by DeGroot and his relentless assistants brought UNM unofficial "Defensive Team of the Year" honors by all of the major wire services. The season totals were a 7–2 record with five shutouts. The Lobos allowed just 46 points in nine games, an average of 5.1 a game. DeGroot was named Skyline Coach of the Year and five Lobos were named honorable mention All-America: captain and tackle Jack Barger, linebackers Larry White and Jim Bruening, guard Don Papini and kicker Mike Prokopiak. DeGroot retired from coaching after the 1952 season.

For three seasons, Bob Titchenal served as the head football coach at New Mexico. His teams compiled records of 5–3–1, 5–5 and 2–8 for a total of a 12–15–1 record. His teams struggled on the playing field and recruiting was a difficulty for Titchenal and his staff. UNM fired Titchenal after three seasons at the helm. Under head coach Dick Clausen, who came to UNM from Coe College, the New Mexico Lobos football team posted back to back records of 4–6. Clausen departed New Mexico after two seasons to accept the position of athletics director at rival Arizona. In two seasons as head coach after being promoted from assistant coach, Marv Levy guided the Lobos to a 14–6 record and earned Skyline Conference Coach of the Year honors both years. One of Levy's landmark wins at New Mexico was a 28–27 upset win over a powerful Air Force team in 1959. Levy left UNM after back to back 7–3 seasons to accept the head football coach position at California and would go on to a Hall of Fame career as a head coach in the NFL.

=== Bill Weeks era (1960–1967) ===
Bill Weeks served an eight-season stint as the head football coach at New Mexico from 1960 to 1967, compiling a record of 40–41–1. His 1961 team won the Aviation Bowl and his 1964 team finished the season ranked No. 16 in the final Coaches' poll.

Coach Weeks won more conference championships – three – than any head coach in the history of New Mexico football. After starting his head coaching career 5–5 in 1960, Weeks and the Lobos embarked on the most successful four-year run in school history. In 1961, UNM finished 7–4 and won the Aviation Bowl with a 29–12 victory over Western Michigan.

That success was followed by outright Western Athletic Conference titles in 1962 and 1963 and a shared conference title in 1964. From 1961 to 1964, the Lobos went 29–12–1 for the best four-season record in program history. Weeks was the school's winningest football coach until Rocky Long surpassed him in September 2005.

Weeks stepped away from coaching after the 1967 season with a final record of 40–41–1.

=== Rudy Feldman era (1968–1973) ===
Rudy Feldman, previously associate head coach at Colorado, took over as head coach following Weeks' retirement. As head coach at UNM, Feldman compiled a record of 24–37–2. In his first season, the Lobos posted a winless 0–10 mark but two years later compiled a 7–3 record followed by a 6–3–2 season the next year.

Feldman was reported to have accepted the Baylor head coaching position in December 1971, but Feldman changed his mind shortly thereafter, opting to remain with the Lobos. Feldman quit coaching after six seasons at the helm of the Lobos.

=== Bill Mondt era (1974–1979) ===
Coach Bill Mondt was promoted from assistant coach to head coach following Feldman's decision to leave coaching. Under Mondt, the Lobos compiled a record of 31–37–1 in six seasons. Mondt's two winning seasons came in 1975 and 1978, with records of 6–5 and 7–5, respectively. Despite only two winning seasons, the Lobos never had a record worse than 4–6–1 in a single season.

=== Joe Morrison era (1980–1982) ===
Joe Morrison came to UNM from UT-Chattanooga. Under his tutelage, the Lobos posted an overall record of 18–15–1, the best of which as a 10–1 record in what turned out to be Morrison's final season.

Morrison departed New Mexico after three seasons to accept the head football coach position at South Carolina.

=== Joe Lee Dunn era (1983–1986) ===
From 1983 to 1986, Joe Lee Dunn, promoted from assistant coach after Morrison's departure, was the head football coach of the Lobos, compiling a 17–30 record. The Lobos were not able to build upon the successes of Morrison's tenure, posting yearly records of 6–6, 4–8, 3–8 and 4–8 during Dunn's five seasons.

Frustration among the fans, athletics department and alumni over the team's struggles led to Dunn's resignation after the 1986 season.

=== Mike Sheppard era (1987–1991) ===
Mike Sheppard was hired away from Long Beach State to take over as head coach of the Lobos football program on December 25, 1986. Under Sheppard, the Lobos sank to new lows, failing to finish better than 3–9 in a single season and fan support and ticket sales at an all-time low to that point. The Lobos record under Sheppard was a dismal 9–50. Sheppard was fired after the 1991 season.

=== Dennis Franchione era (1992–1997) ===
On December 5, 1991, Dennis Franchione was hired away from Texas State and announced as the Lobos new head coach, given the task of rebuilding the lowly program after five dismal seasons. In his six seasons at New Mexico, he led the Lobos to a 33–36 record, including a 9–4 mark in 1997, which earned the Lobos a WAC Mountain Division Championship and an invitation to play in the Insight.com Bowl, their first bowl berth since 1961. Franchione departed New Mexico for TCU after the 1997 season. During the 1996 and 1997 seasons, his roster included future NFL Hall of Fame linebacker Brian Urlacher, who would set numerous defensive records during his time at UNM. His #44 was retired at a ceremony of a UNM home football game several years later.

=== Rocky Long era (1998–2008) ===
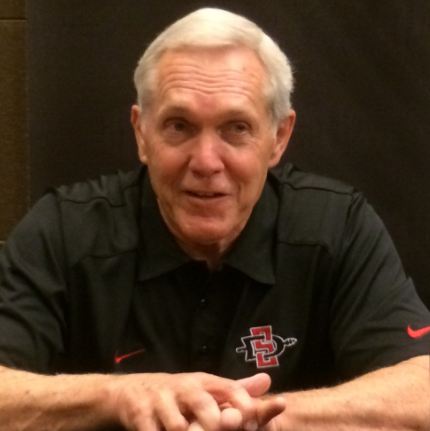
Rocky Long

Rocky Long, previously defensive coordinator at UCLA and a UNM alum, was named as the Lobos' head football coach on December 20, 1997. His overall won-loss record through the 2008 season is 65–69, including 43–31 since 2001, the best five-year stretch for Lobo football in over forty years. He is the most successful head coach in New Mexico Football history, passing Roy Johnson during the 2005 season.

He led the Lobos to three straight post-season bowl games (2003–05) for the first time in school history and the Lobos were bowl-eligible for seven straight seasons, another record. This streak continued into the 2007 season as the Lobos accepted a bid to the New Mexico Bowl. He garnered his first bowl win as Lobo coach by defeating the Nevada Wolf Pack 23–0 in the 2007 New Mexico Bowl.

After 11 seasons, and an overall losing record of coaching at UNM, Long decided to resign on November 17, 2008, two days after the Lobos' regular season ended. Long cited that he was not the right person to lead the program to newer heights. He added that he had no plans of retirement, and that he wanted to continue to coach as a coordinator.

=== Mike Locksley era (2009–2011) ===
Mike Locksley, previously offensive coordinator at Illinois, was named head coach of the New Mexico Lobos on December 9, 2008. He signed a six-year contract worth $750,000 annually. Locksley is the first and only African American head football coach in UNM football history.

In late May 2009, a former administrative assistant at New Mexico filed an age and sex discrimination complaint against Locksley with the Equal Opportunity Commission. The complaint was filed by Locksley's former administrative assistant Sylvia Lopez. Lopez claimed to have been subjected to age and sexual discrimination before being transferred out of Locksley's office. The claims were later withdrawn. In late September 2009, Locksley was reprimanded for an altercation with an assistant coach. He was subsequently suspended without pay for ten days. He was not on the sideline for the game against UNLV on October 24, 2009.

Locksley led his Lobos to 1–11 records his first and second seasons. Despite fan outcry to fire him, he returned for his third season. The high buyout was a large reason UNM chose at first not to fire him. UNM athletic director Paul Krebs, who made the decision to retain Locksley, expected improvement in the 2011 season. On September 25, 2011, Locksley was relieved of his duties following an 0–4 start that culminated in a loss at home to FCS Sam Houston State as well as the arrest of a minor for a DWI while driving a car registered to Locksley's 19-year-old son Meiko, a member of the Lobo Football team. After an internal investigation by UNM, it was found the minor was not a recruit as erroneously reported, but instead a childhood friend of Meiko Locksley from his Champaign, Illinois days where his father served as offensive coordinator for the Illini from 2005 to 2008.

=== Bob Davie era (2012–2019) ===
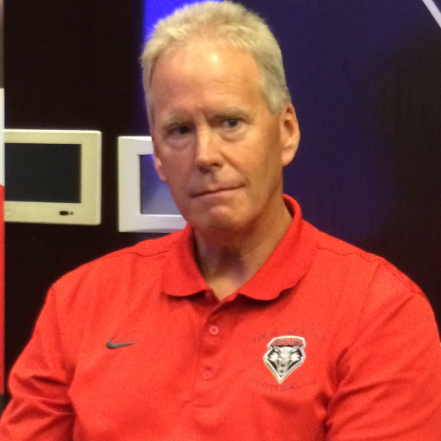
Bob Davie

The Lobos' 30th head coach was former Notre Dame head coach Bob Davie, who took over after Locksley was fired. Davie, who has extensive experience as an assistant coach in addition to the stint as a head coach at Notre Dame, had been out of coaching and serving a college football analyst for ESPN for a decade when he was hired by the Lobos.

In Davie's first season as head coach, the Lobos finished the 2012 season with a 4–9 record. Following the season, Davie was given a contract extension by the Lobos athletics department. In 2013, Davie's second season at the helm, UNM compiled a 3–9 record. After another subpar season in 2014, the 2015 Lobos compiled a record of 7–6, which culminated with an appearance in the New Mexico Bowl, UNM's first bowl appearance since 2007. The Lobos lost the game to Arizona by a score of 45–37. After the season, Davie's contract was extended for a second time. On November 25, 2019, Davie and New Mexico agreed to part ways after 8 seasons and a 35–64 record.

=== Danny Gonzales era (2020–2023) ===
On December 17, 2019, Arizona State defensive coordinator and former Lobo player Danny Gonzales was named the 31st head coach of the Lobos. On November 25, 2023, Danny Gonzales was fired 4 years into his 5-year contract after a 4–8 season and 2–6 in the Mountain West.

=== Bronco Mendenhall era (2024) ===
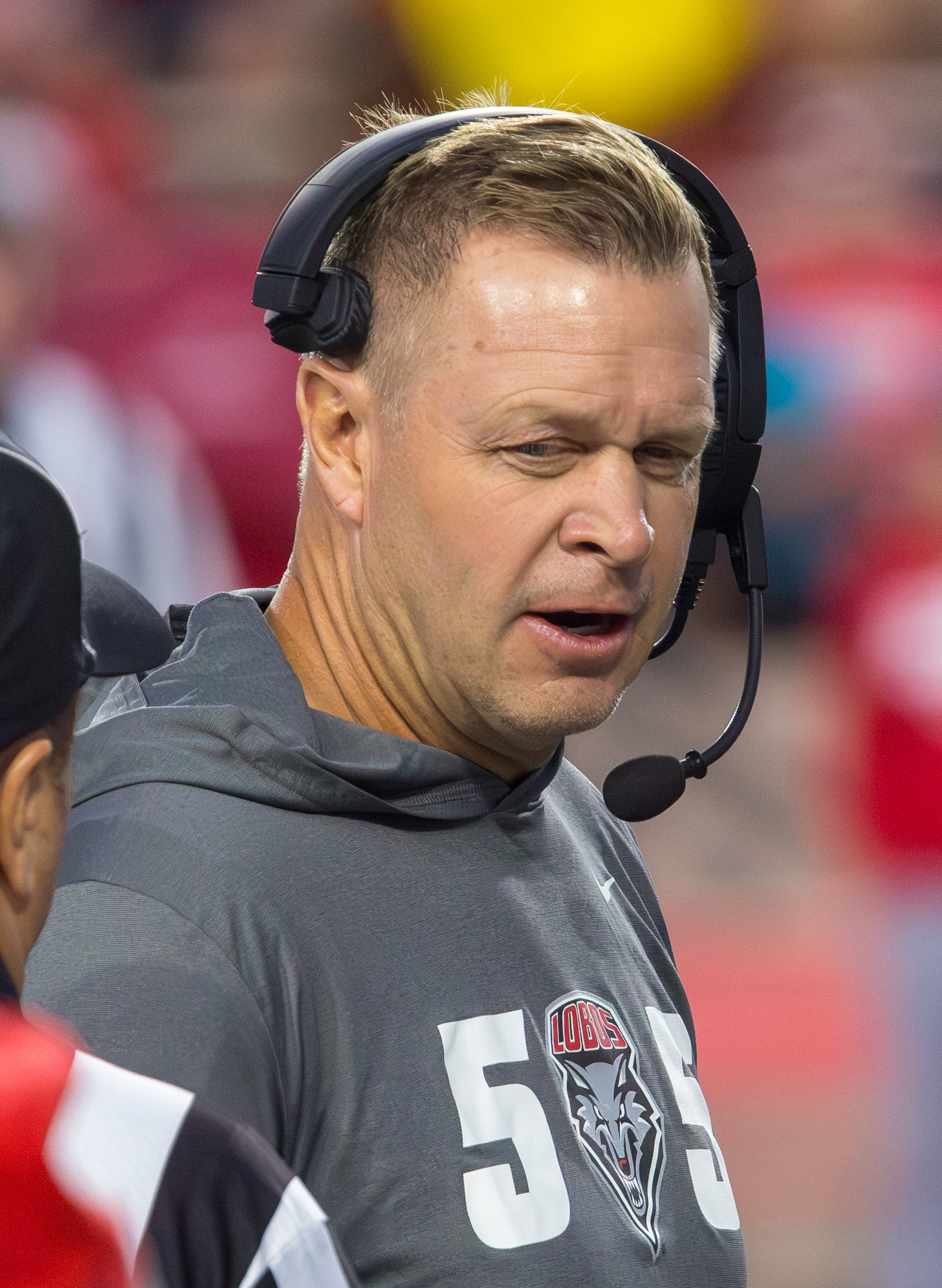
Mendenhall

It was announced in 2023 that former Virginia Cavaliers coach Bronco Mendenhall was hired to a five-season contract as Lobos head coach. Mendenhall had previously served as a New Mexico assistant coach from 1998 to 2002. Press reports at the time noted that the team "hasn't won more than four games since 2016."

=== Jason Eck era (2024–present) ===
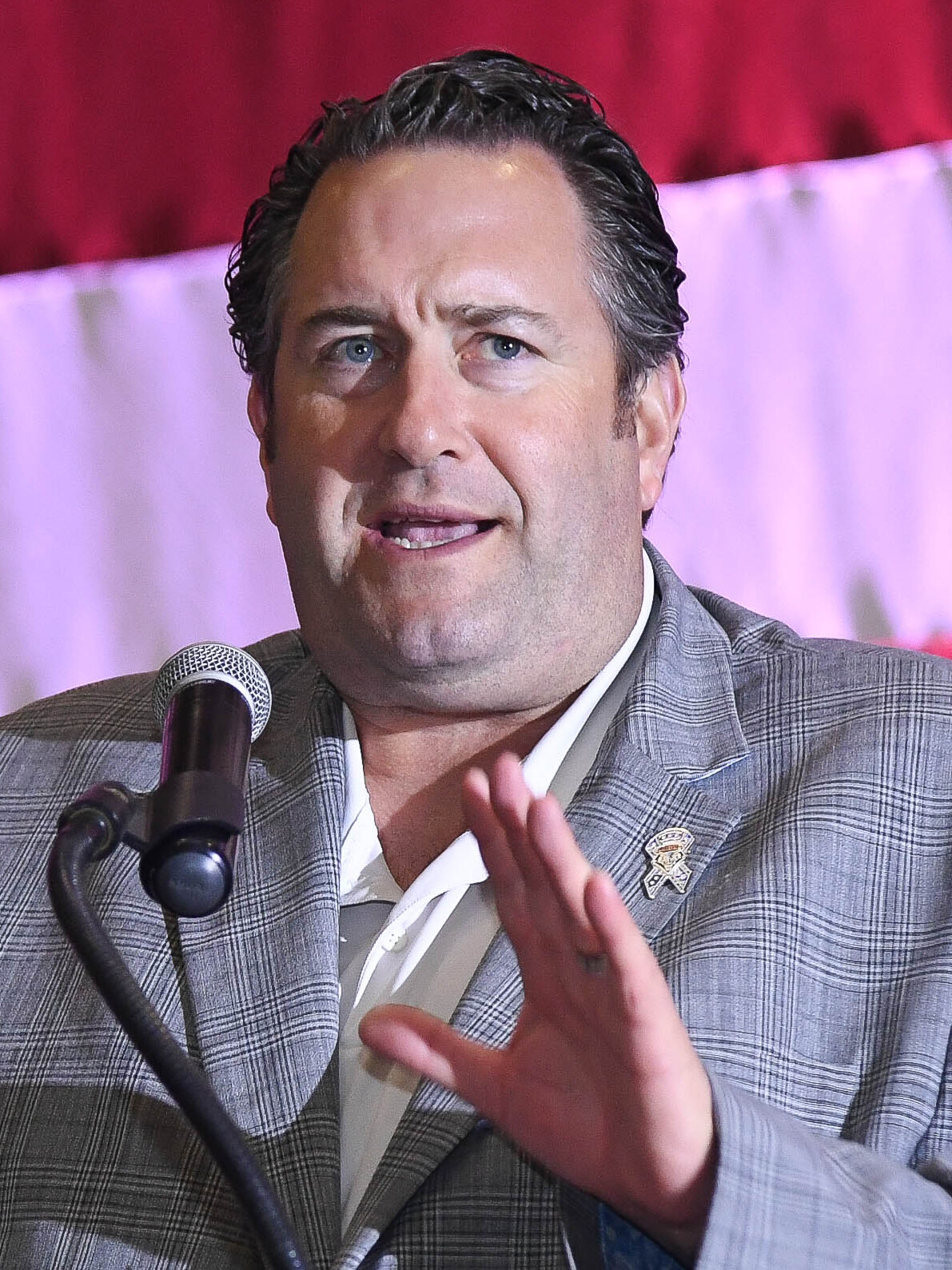
Eck

Jason Eck was named the 33rd head coach of the New Mexico Lobos on December 14, 2024, succeeding Bronco Mendenhall.[63] Eck arrived from the University of Idaho, where he led the Vandals to three consecutive FCS playoff appearances and compiled a 26–13 record over three seasons.[64] His first recruiting class at New Mexico included 51 players, with 34 transfers and 17 high school recruits, one of the largest in program history.[65]

In his first season, Eck guided the Lobos to bowl eligibility for the first time since 2016, ending a long postseason drought.[66] The team finished with a 9–3 overall record and 6–2 in Mountain West play, tying for first place in the conference.[66] The Lobos achieved a 6–0 home record, the longest home winning streak in over a decade, and drew 37,440 fans against New Mexico State, the largest attendance for the Rio Grande Rivalry since 2007.[67]

The season featured a historic 35–10 victory at UCLA in the Rose Bowl, marking New Mexico’s first road win over a Power Four opponent and first victory over a Big Ten team.[69] The Lobos also recorded a six-game winning streak, the longest since 1996–97, and made national strides with improvements in rushing defense and scoring defense.[70]

Multiple players earned All-Mountain West honors, including Jaxton Eck, named Co-Defensive Player of the Year. Jason Eck himself was named Mountain West Coach of the Year, the first Lobo to earn the award since 2002.[71] Beyond on-field results, Eck was credited with revitalizing program culture, emphasizing accountability, discipline, and renewed fan engagement.[71]

Shortly after the regular season ended, Eck signed a contract extension.

The 2026 season saw the Lobos make some history. On Halloween night, they defeated San Jose State 21-16 in Week 9 for their first victory in San Jose since 1969 that also gave them a 4-0 start in Mountain West play for the first time ever. The following day saw the team ranked in the AP Poll (at #22) for the first time in program history (they also received enough votes to get ranked in the Coaches Poll for the first time since 1997).

== Conference affiliations ==
- Independent (1892–1930)
- Border Conference (1931–1950)
- Skyline Conference (Mountain States Conference) (1951–1961)
- Western Athletic Conference (1962–1998)
- Mountain West Conference (1999–present)

== Championships ==
=== Conference championships ===
New Mexico has won four conference championships, doing so through three conferences: Border Conference, Western Athletic Conference and the Mountain West Conference.

Year	Conference	Coach	Overall record	Conference record
1938†	Border Conference	Ted Shipkey	8–3	4–2
1962	Western Athletic Conference	Bill Weeks	7–2–1	2–1–1
1963	Western Athletic Conference	Bill Weeks	6–4	3–1
1964†	Western Athletic Conference	Bill Weeks	9–2	3–1

† Co-champions

=== Division championships ===
The Lobos have won two division titles, one each in the WAC and the Mountain West Conference.

Year	Division	Coach	Opponent	CG result
1997	WAC - Mountain Division	Dennis Franchione	Colorado State	L 13–41
2016†	Mountain West - Mountain Division	Bob Davie	N/A lost tiebreaker to Wyoming	

† Co-champions

== Bowl games ==
New Mexico has participated in 14 bowl games. The Lobos have a bowl record of 4–9–1.

Date	Coach	Bowl	Opponent	Result
January 2, 1939	Ted Shipkey	Sun Bowl	Utah	L 0–26
January 1, 1944	Willis Barnes	Sun Bowl	Southwestern	L 0–7
January 1, 1946	Willis Barnes	Sun Bowl	Denver	W 34–24
January 1, 1947	Willis Barnes	Harbor Bowl	Montana State	T 13–13
December 9, 1961	Bill Weeks	Aviation Bowl	Western Michigan	W 28–12
December 27, 1997	Dennis Franchione	Insight.com Bowl	Arizona	L 14–20
December 25, 2002	Rocky Long	Las Vegas Bowl	UCLA	L 13–27
December 24, 2003	Rocky Long	Las Vegas Bowl	Oregon State	L 14–55
December 30, 2004	Rocky Long	Emerald Bowl	Navy	L 19–34
December 23, 2006	Rocky Long	New Mexico Bowl	San Jose State	L 12–20
December 22, 2007	Rocky Long	New Mexico Bowl	Nevada	W 23–0
December 19, 2015	Bob Davie	New Mexico Bowl	Arizona	L 37–45
December 17, 2016	Bob Davie	New Mexico Bowl	UTSA	W 23–20
December 26, 2025	Jason Eck	Rate Bowl	Minnesota	L 17–20^{OT}

== Rivalries ==
=== Arizona ===
Annually played from 1938 to 1990, the winner of the Arizona–New Mexico rivalry game took ownership of a gun in the Battle for the Kit Carson Rifle. The gun is a Springfield Model 1866 rifle that is rumored to have once belonged to the famous frontier scout, Kit Carson. Game scores from each game are carved into the stock of the rifle. Prior to the 1997 Insight.com Bowl, the two schools announced that they would retire the rifle due to concerns of its history of violence against Native Americans and it has not been used during any subsequent games between the two schools. The two teams quit playing annually after the 1990 season and now play every few years.

=== New Mexico State ===
New Mexico's biggest rival is its in-state foe, the New Mexico State Aggies, whom they play annually. The series is known as the Rio Grande Rivalry. The rivalry between New Mexico's only two NCAA Division I institutions dates back to January 1, 1894 – 18 years before New Mexico achieved statehood – when the schools met in a football contest in Albuquerque. While it is clear that New Mexico won that first game, school records seem to disagree on the score. According to New Mexico media guides the final score was 25–5 but according to New Mexico State media guides the score was 18–6. By the time New Mexico entered the union in 1912 UNM and New Mexico A&M (as NMSU was known prior to 1960) had already met on the gridiron six times.

Beginning in 1993, the two universities played for the Maloof Trophy, but it was short-lived; the trophy was retired in 2000. Until 1937 the series was competitive with the Aggies holding a 15–12–4 lead over the Lobos. Since 1938 the Lobos have dominated the series 54–16–1 except during 1959–1968 when the Aggies won 7 of 10 meetings. The Lobos' all-time advantage is 72–33–5; however, the rivalry remains spirited. Most recently the Lobos defeated the Aggies 55–52 on September 21, 2019, in Albuquerque. The September 26, 2009 game when the Aggies won 20–17 in Albuquerque was the 100th time the teams had played each other.

== Retired numbers ==
The Lobos have retired three numbers.

New Mexico Lobos retired numbers
No.	Player	Pos.	Tenure	No. ret.	Ref.
42	Bobby Santiago (Note: Although the No. 42 and 44 were brought out of retirement briefly in the 2021 season, they have been retired again and currently no players wear them.)	HB	1959–1962	—N/a	
43	Don Perkins	FB	1957–1959	—N/a	
44	Brian Urlacher	S/LB	1996–1999	2013	

== All-Americans ==
- Hyrum Hatch, LS- 2024 (CFN Freshman All-American)

== Future non-conference opponents ==
Announced schedules as of May 12, 2026.

2027	2028	2029
Northern Colorado	Oregon State	at Central Michigan
at Oregon State	at New Mexico State	New Mexico State
at Texas Tech		
New Mexico State		
