= Eddie Kimball =

American football player and coach (1903–1990)

Biographical details
- Born: October 25, 1903; Logan, Utah, U.S.
- Died: December 26, 1990 (aged 87); Provo, Utah, U.S.

Playing career

Football
- 1923–1924: BYU
- Position: End

Coaching career (HC unless noted)

Football
- 1937–1941: BYU
- 1946–1948: BYU

Basketball
- 1935–1936: BYU
- 1938–1941: BYU

Administrative career (AD unless noted)
- 1937–1963: BYU

Head coaching record
- Overall: 34–32–8 (football); 59–38 (basketball)

Edwin Roberts Kimball (October 25, 1903 – December 26, 1990) was an American football player, coach of football and basketball, and college athletics administrator. He served as the head coach at Brigham Young University (BYU) from 1937 to 1941 and again from 1946 to 1948, compiling a record of 34–32–8. Kimball was also the head basketball coach at BYU from 1935 to 1936 and again from 1938 to 1941, tallying a mark of 59–38. He served as the school's athletic director from 1937 to 1963.

Kimball was born on October 25, 1903, in Logan, Utah. He spent his childhood living on ranches in St. David, Arizona and Widtsoe, Utah. He moved to Draper, Utah in 1918 and attended Jordan High School in Sandy. Kimball graduated from BYU in 1926 with a degree in accounting. He later earned a master's degree from the University of Southern California and a doctorate in education from the University of Oregon. Kimball died on December 26, 1990, at his home in Provo, Utah.

== Head coaching record ==
=== Football ===
Year	Team	Overall	Conference	Standing	Bowl/playoffs
BYU Cougars (Rocky Mountain Conference) (1937)
1937	BYU	6–3	5–2	T–3rd	
BYU Cougars (Mountain States Conference) (1938–1941)
1938	BYU	4–3–1	3–2–1	T–2nd	
1939	BYU	5–2–2	2–2–2	4th	
1940	BYU	2–4–2	2–3–1	4th	
1941	BYU	4–3–2	3–1–2	T–2nd	
BYU Cougars (Mountain States / Skyline Six Conference) (1946–1948)
1946	BYU	5–4–1	3–2–1	T–4th	
1947	BYU	3–7	1–5	7th	
1948	BYU	5–6	1–3	5th	
BYU:		34–32–8	20–20–7		
Total:		34–32–8			

== See also ==
- List of college football head coaches with non-consecutive tenure
