= 1938 Arizona State Bulldogs football team =

American college football season

1938 Arizona State Bulldogs football
- Conference: Border Conference
- Record: 3–6 (0–4 Border)
- Head coach: Dixie Howell (1st season)
- Captain: Wes Hasting
- Home stadium: Goodwin Stadium

1938 Border Conference football standings
	Conf.					Overall
Team	W		L		T	W		L		T
New Mexico A&M +	4	–	1	–	0	7	–	2	–	0
New Mexico +	4	–	2	–	0	8	–	3	–	0
No. 11 Texas Tech	2	–	0	–	0	10	–	1	–	0
Texas Mines	3	–	2	–	0	6	–	3	–	0
Arizona State–Flagstaff	1	–	2	–	0	2	–	6	–	1
Arizona	0	–	3	–	0	3	–	6	–	0
Arizona State	0	–	4	–	0	3	–	6	–	0
+ – Conference co-champions; Rankings from AP Poll

The 1938 Arizona State Bulldogs football team was an American football team that represented Arizona State Teachers College (later renamed Arizona State University) in the Border Conference during the 1938 college football season. In their first season under head coach Dixie Howell, the Bulldogs compiled a 3–6 record (0–4 against Border opponents) and were outscored by their opponents by a combined total of 98 to 89. Arizona State's team captain was center Wes Hastings. The Bulldogs finished 2–2 at home and 1–4 on the road. Earl Pomeroy and Hilman Walker were assistant coaches. All home games were played at Goodwin Stadium in Tempe, Arizona.

== Schedule ==
Date	Opponent	Site	Result	Attendance	Source
September 19	at San Jose State*	Spartan Stadium; San Jose, CA	L 7–18	10,000	
September 30	at New Mexico	University Stadium; Albuquerque, NM	L 0–21		
October 8	Cal Poly*	Goodwin Stadium; Tempe, AZ	W 13–0		
October 15	at Arizona State–Flagstaff	Skidmore Field; Flagstaff, AZ	L 13–19		
October 22	New Mexico A&M	Goodwin Stadium; Tempe, AZ	L 12–14		
October 29	Santa Barbara State*	Goodwin Stadium; Tempe, AZ	W 10–0		
November 5	Hardin–Simmons*	Phoenix Union High School; Phoenix, AZ	L 7–12		
November 19	at Texas Mines	Kidd Field; El Paso, TX	L 6–14	5,000	
November 26	at Whittier*	Hadley Field; Whittier, CA	W 21–0		
*Non-conference game

== Game summaries ==
In the season opener, Arizona State Teacher's College lost an 18–7 road game against San Jose State. The Bulldogs were shutout 21–0 in a road loss at New Mexico. Arizona State rebounded with a 13–0 victory over Cal Poly in their home opener. The Bulldogs suffered a 19–13 loss to NAU on the road. Despite a 99-yard touchdown run from Wayne Pitts, Arizona State dropped a 14–12 road game at New Mexico State. The Bulldogs responded with a 10–0 home shutout win against California-Santa Barbara. During their home finale, Arizona State fell, 12–7, to Hardin-Simmons. The Bulldogs dropped a 14–6 contest to Texas-El Paso on the road. Arizona State closed out its season with a 21–0 shutout road victory over Whittier.

== Roster ==
The usual Arizona State lineup included left end Sam Andrews, left tackle Mark Kalastro, left guard Noble Riggs, center Wes Hastings, right guard Albert Sanserino, right tackle Henry Rockwell, right end Glenn Landreth, quarterback Ross Relles, halfbacks Hascall Henshaw and Bill Davis, and fullback Rex Hopper.

Wiley Aiker, Ted Anderson, Hilbert Brady, and Frank Consentino were also on roster.
