= 1938 Wyoming Cowboys football team =

American college football season

1938 Wyoming Cowboys football
- Conference: Mountain States Conference
- Record: 2–5–1 (1–4–1 MSC)
- Head coach: Willard Witte (6th season)
- Captain: None
- Home stadium: Corbett Field

1938 Mountain States Conference football standings
	Conf.					Overall
Team	W		L		T	W		L		T
Utah $	4	–	0	–	2	7	–	1	–	2
BYU	3	–	2	–	1	4	–	3	–	1
Denver	3	–	2	–	1	4	–	4	–	1
Colorado	3	–	2	–	1	3	–	4	–	1
Utah State	3	–	3	–	0	4	–	4	–	0
Wyoming	1	–	4	–	1	2	–	5	–	1
Colorado A&M	0	–	4	–	2	1	–	5	–	2
$ – Conference champion

The 1938 Wyoming Cowboys football team represented the University of Wyoming in the Mountain States Conference (MSC) during the 1938 college football season. In its sixth and final season under head coach Willard Witte, the team compiled a 2–5–1 record (1–4–1 against MSC opponents), finished sixth in the conference, and was outscored by a total of 147 to 66.

== Schedule ==
Date	Opponent	Site	Result	Attendance	Source
September 17	at Fort Warren*	Cheyenne, WY	W 20–7		
September 24	at Texas Tech*	Tech Field; Lubbock, TX	L 0–39	5,000	
October 1	Colorado A&M	Corbett Field; Laramie, WY (rivalry)	T 0–0		
October 8	at BYU	Provo, UT	L 13–22		
October 22	Denver	Corbett Field; Laramie, WY	L 0–6	5,500	
October 29	at Colorado	Colorado Stadium; Boulder, CO	L 6–20	6,500	
November 12	at Utah State	Aggie Stadium; Logan, UT (rivalry)	W 27–13		
November 19	Utah	Corbett Field; Laramie, WY	L 0–39	3,500	
*Non-conference game
