= 1938 Texas Tech Red Raiders football team =

American college football season

1938 Texas Tech Red Raiders football
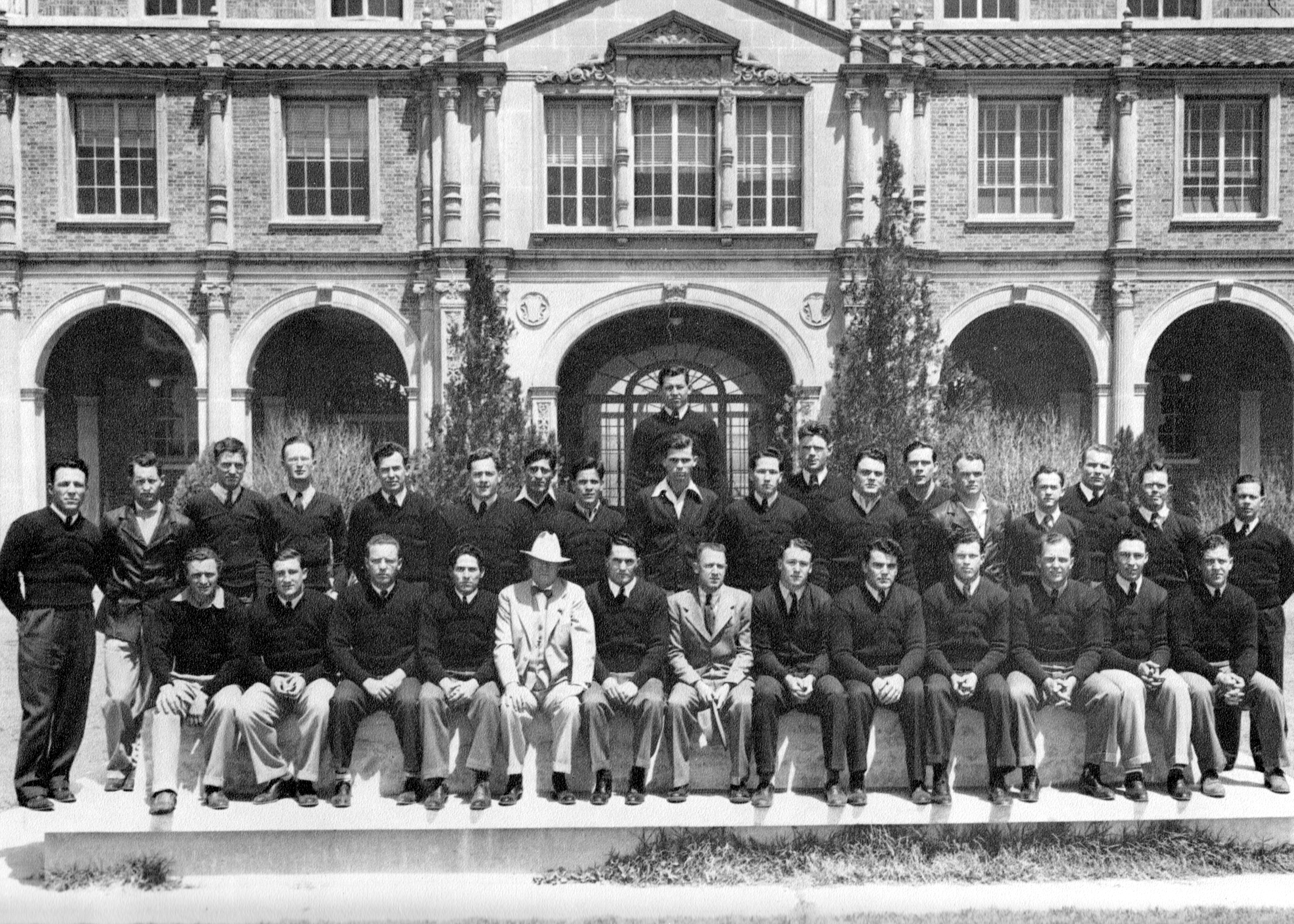
- 1938 Texas Tech football team

Cotton Bowl Classic, L 13–20 vs. Saint Mary's
- Conference: Border Conference

Ranking
- AP: No. 11
- Record: 10–1 (2–0 Border)
- Head coach: Pete Cawthon (9th season)
- Offensive scheme: Single-wing
- Base defense: 6–2
- Home stadium: Tech Field

1938 Border Conference football standings
	Conf.					Overall
Team	W		L		T	W		L		T
New Mexico A&M +	4	–	1	–	0	7	–	2	–	0
New Mexico +	4	–	2	–	0	8	–	3	–	0
No. 11 Texas Tech	2	–	0	–	0	10	–	1	–	0
Texas Mines	3	–	2	–	0	6	–	3	–	0
Arizona State–Flagstaff	1	–	2	–	0	2	–	6	–	1
Arizona	0	–	3	–	0	3	–	6	–	0
Arizona State	0	–	4	–	0	3	–	6	–	0
+ – Conference co-champions; Rankings from AP Poll

The 1938 Texas Tech Red Raiders football team represented Texas Technological College—now known as Texas Tech University—as a member of the Border Conference during the 1938 college football season. Led by nithh-year head coach, the Red Raiders compiled an overall record of 10–1 with a mark of 2–0 in conference play. They did not play enough conference games to qualify for the Border Conference championship. Texas Tech was invited to the Cotton Bowl Classic, where they lost to Saint Mary's. The team played home games at Tech Field in Lubbock, Texas.

== Schedule ==
Date	Opponent	Rank	Site	Result	Attendance	Source
September 17	Montana State*		Tech Field; Lubbock, TX	W 35–0	7,500	
September 24	Wyoming*		Tech Field; Lubbock, TX	W 39–0	5,000	
September 30	vs. Duquesne*		Civic Stadium; Buffalo, NY	W 7–6	12,000	
October 8	Oklahoma City*		Tech Field; Lubbock, TX	W 60–0	7,000	
October 15	at Montana*		Dornblaser Field; Missoula, MT	W 19–13	8,000	
October 22	vs. Texas Mines		Fly Field; Odessa, TX	W 14–7	7,000	
November 5	Loyola (LA)*		Tech Field; Lubbock, TX	W 55–0	8,000	
November 11	Gonzaga*^{†}		Tech Field; Lubbock, TX	W 7–0	10,000	
November 19	at New Mexico	No. 19	University Stadium; Albuquerque, NM	W 17–7	6,500	
November 26	Marquette*	No. 17	Tech Field; Lubbock, TX	W 21–2	12,000	
January 2	vs. Saint Mary's*	No. 11	Cotton Bowl; Dallas, TX (Cotton Bowl Classic)	L 13–20	40,000	
*Non-conference game; ^{†}Homecoming; Rankings from AP Poll released prior to the game
