= 1938 Arizona State–Flagstaff Lumberjacks football team =

American college football season

1938 Arizona State–Flagstaff Lumberjacks football
- Conference: Border Conference
- Record: 2–6–1 (1–2 Border)
- Head coach: Garrett Arbelbide (3rd season)
- Home stadium: Skidmore Field

1938 Border Conference football standings
	Conf.					Overall
Team	W		L		T	W		L		T
New Mexico A&M +	4	–	1	–	0	7	–	2	–	0
New Mexico +	4	–	2	–	0	8	–	3	–	0
No. 11 Texas Tech	2	–	0	–	0	10	–	1	–	0
Texas Mines	3	–	2	–	0	6	–	3	–	0
Arizona State–Flagstaff	1	–	2	–	0	2	–	6	–	1
Arizona	0	–	3	–	0	3	–	6	–	0
Arizona State	0	–	4	–	0	3	–	6	–	0
+ – Conference co-champions; Rankings from AP Poll

The 1938 Arizona State–Flagstaff Lumberjacks football team represented Arizona State Teachers College at Flagstaff (now known as Northern Arizona University) as a member of the Border Conference during the 1938 college football season. Led by third-year head coach Garrett Arbelbide, the Lumberjacks compiled an overall record of 2–6–1, with a conference record of 1–2, and finished fifth in the Border.

== Schedule ==
Date	Opponent	Site	Result	Attendance	Source
September 24	at BYU*	BYU Stadium; Provo, UT	L 0–19	3,500	
October 1	vs. Nevada*	Las Vegas, NV	T 12–12		
October 8	Fort Hays State*	Skidmore Field; Flagstaff, AZ	L 19–20		
October 15	Arizona State	Skidmore Field; Flagstaff, AZ	W 19–13		
October 22	New Mexico	Skidmore Field; Flagstaff, AZ	L 0–20		
October 28	at New Mexico A&M	Quesenberry Field; Las Cruces, NM	L 0–34		
November 5	Panhandle A&M*	Skidmore Field; Flagstaff, AZ	W 33–7		
November 11	at Whittier*	Hadley Field; Whittier, CA	L 19–23	4,000	
November 24	at San Jose State*	Spartan Stadium; San Jose, CA	L 12–34		
*Non-conference game
