= Welcome Stadium =

Dayton, Ohio stadium

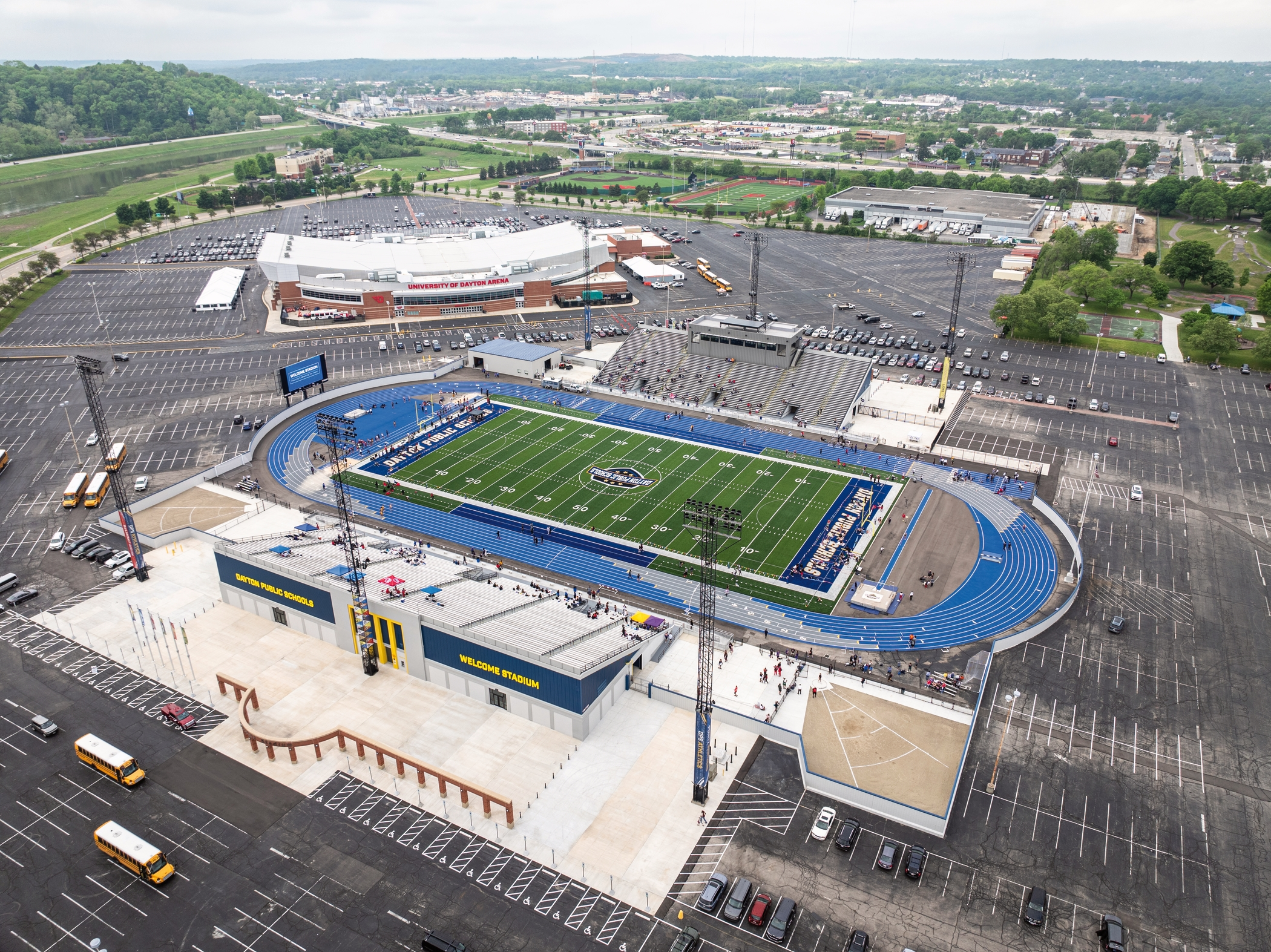
- Renovated Welcome Stadium (2022-2023)
- Interactive map of Welcome Stadium
- Location: 1601 South Edwin C. Moses Boulevard; Dayton, OH 45417
- Coordinates: 39°44′12″N 84°11′53″W
- Owner: Dayton Public Schools
- Capacity: 11,000

Construction
- Opened: 1949
- Renovated: 2022/2023
- Cost: $32 million (2023 renovation)
- Architect: MSA Sport (2023 Renovation)

Tenants
- Dayton Flyers football (NCAA D-I) (1974–present); Aviation Bowl (NCAA) (1961); Dayton Dynamo (NPSL) (2016–2017)

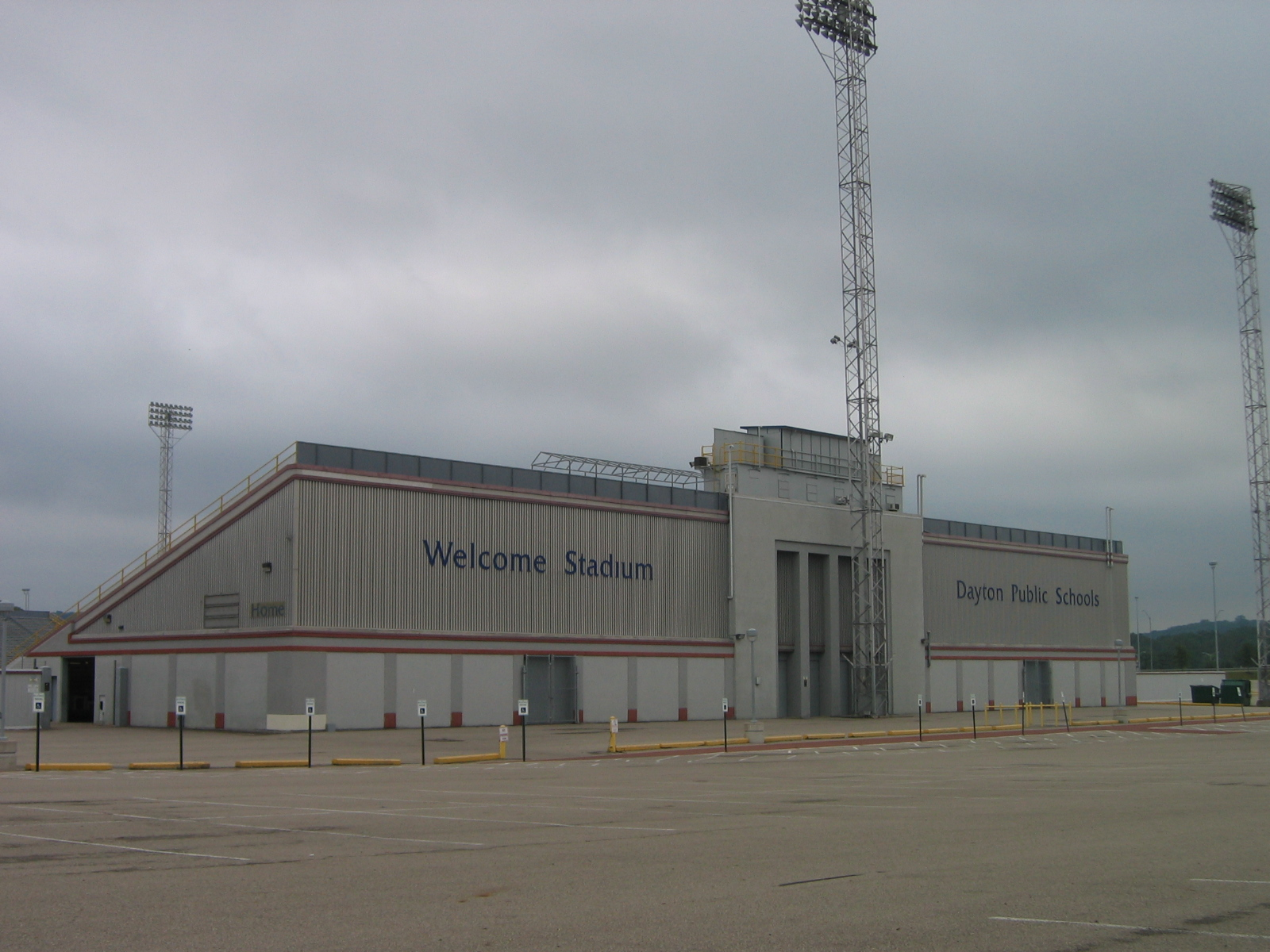
2008

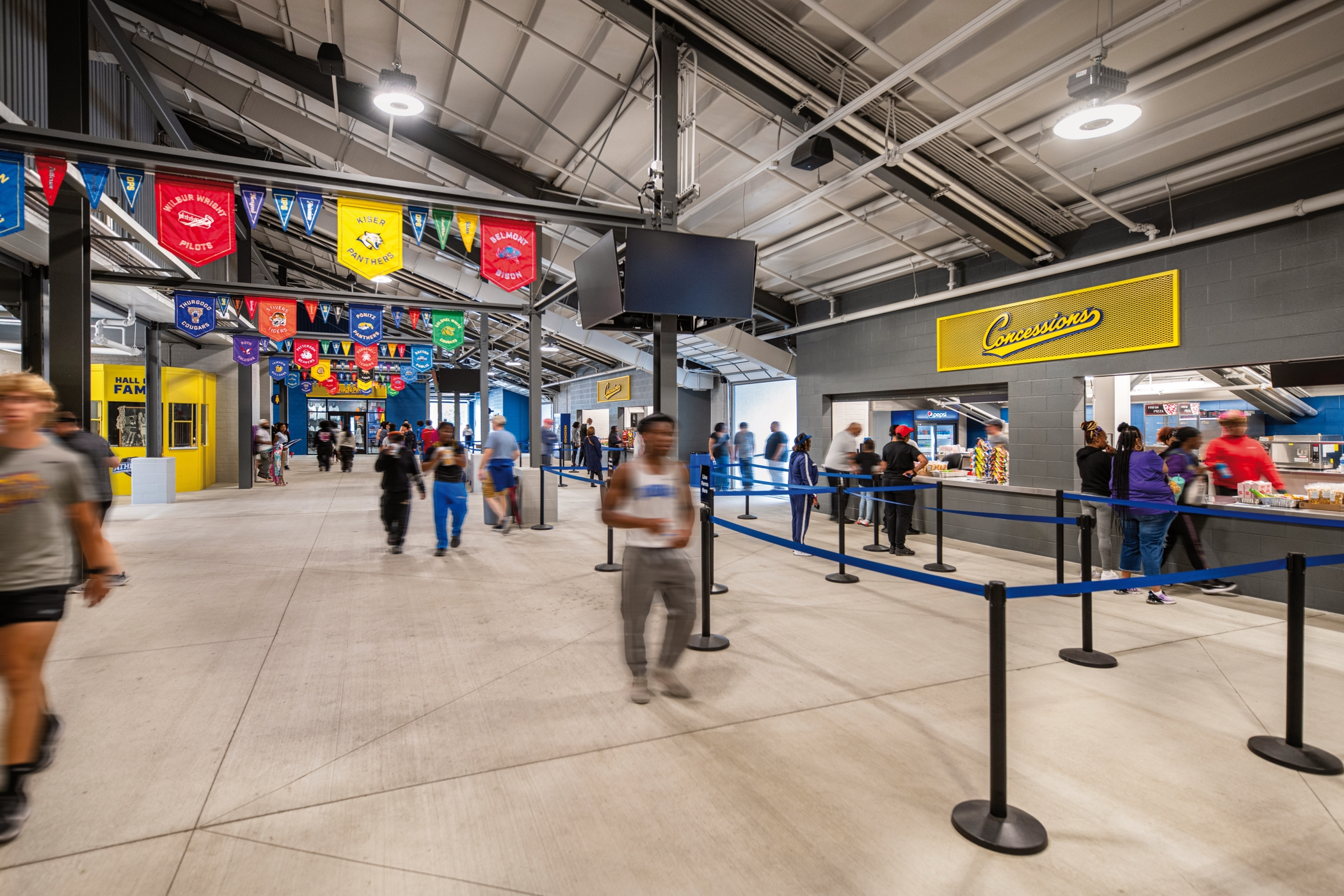
Renovated concourse at Welcome Stadium (2023)

Welcome Stadium is an 11,000-seat multi-purpose stadium in Dayton, Ohio, United States, owned and operated by Dayton Public Schools. It is named in honor of Percival "Perc" Welcome, Director of Athletics for the Dayton Public Schools from 1946-1958. Primary tenants of the facility include University of Dayton Flyers football team and multiple Dayton Public High Schools.

== History ==
It opened in 1949, and is home to all of the city's high schools. Since 1974, it has also been home to the Dayton Flyers football team. It hosted the 1961 Aviation Bowl and the Ohio High School State Track and Field finals for the years 1999–2003. It hosted the USA Outdoor Track and Field Championships Men's division in 1953 and 1957 the Women's division in 1963 and 1969. It also hosts Ohio's High School (OMEA) marching band finals in late October, early November. Soccer club Dayton Dynamo were tenants.

In 2021, the Board of Education hired the team of MSA Sport + Shook Construction to develop a Master Plan for improvements and expansion to Welcome Stadium. Phase 1 of the Master Plan, which was constructed in 2022 and complete in 2023 was a total project cost of $32 million and included a complete overhaul and restoration of the historic grandstands, a field and track renovation, and new Press Tower and full renovation of both concourses. Future phases to be included from the Master Plan include a new 10,000 s.f. field house in the north end zone, and a multipurpose field NW of the track for field events and community recreation.

On July 27, 2019, the stadium hosted a Cincinnati Bengals training camp. The event was part of commemorations of the National Football League's official centennial season, paying tribute to one of its charter franchises—the Dayton Triangles. The team and NFL originally aimed for the camp to be held on new turf at the Triangles' former home field, Triangle Park (site of the NFL's first game), but the construction was called off after the discovery of a "unique and sizable anomaly" on the site in an archaeological survey.

== See also ==
- List of NCAA Division I FCS football stadiums
