= 1938 Texas Mines Miners football team =

American college football season

1938 Texas Mines Miners football
- Conference: Border Conference
- Record: 6–3 (3–2 Border)
- Head coach: Mack Saxon (10th season)
- Home stadium: Kidd Field

1938 Border Conference football standings
	Conf.					Overall
Team	W		L		T	W		L		T
New Mexico A&M +	4	–	1	–	0	7	–	2	–	0
New Mexico +	4	–	2	–	0	8	–	3	–	0
No. 11 Texas Tech	2	–	0	–	0	10	–	1	–	0
Texas Mines	3	–	2	–	0	6	–	3	–	0
Arizona State–Flagstaff	1	–	2	–	0	2	–	6	–	1
Arizona	0	–	3	–	0	3	–	6	–	0
Arizona State	0	–	4	–	0	3	–	6	–	0
+ – Conference co-champions; Rankings from AP Poll

The 1938 Texas Mines Miners football team was an American football team that represented Texas School of Mines (now known as University of Texas at El Paso) as a member of the Border Conference during the 1938 college football season. In its tenth season under head coach Mack Saxon, the team compiled a 6–3 record (3–2 against Border Conference opponents), finished fourth in the conference, and outscored opponents by a total of 153 to 72.

== Schedule ==
Date	Time	Opponent	Site	Result	Attendance	Source
October 1		New Mexico Military*	Kidd Field; El Paso, TX	W 26–0		
October 7		at Colorado State–Greeley*	Jackson Field; Greeley, CO	W 32–0	2,500	
October 15		New Mexico	Kidd Field; El Paso, TX	W 7–6	7,000	
October 22		vs. Texas Tech	Fly Field; Odessa, TX	L 7–14	7,000	
October 29	2:30 p.m.	St. Mary's (TX)*	Kidd Field; El Paso, TX	L 6–13		
November 11		at Arizona	Arizona Stadium; Tucson, AZ	W 26–14		
November 19		Arizona State^{†}	Kidd Field; El Paso, TX	W 14–6	5,000	
November 24		at New Mexico A&M	Kidd Field; El Paso, TX (rivalry)	L 9–13	10,000	
December 3		at Fresno State*	Fresno State College Stadium; Fresno, CA	W 26–6	5,000	
*Non-conference game; ^{†}Homecoming; All times are in Central time
