= 1938 Colorado A&M Aggies football team =

American college football season

1938 Colorado A&M Aggies football
- Conference: Mountain States Conference
- Record: 1–5–2 (0–4–2 MSC)
- Head coach: Harry W. Hughes (28th season)
- Home stadium: Colorado Field

1938 Mountain States Conference football standings
	Conf.					Overall
Team	W		L		T	W		L		T
Utah $	4	–	0	–	2	7	–	1	–	2
BYU	3	–	2	–	1	4	–	3	–	1
Denver	3	–	2	–	1	4	–	4	–	1
Colorado	3	–	2	–	1	3	–	4	–	1
Utah State	3	–	3	–	0	4	–	4	–	0
Wyoming	1	–	4	–	1	2	–	5	–	1
Colorado A&M	0	–	4	–	2	1	–	5	–	2
$ – Conference champion

The 1938 Colorado A&M Aggies football team was an American football team that represented Colorado State College of Agriculture and Mechanic Arts—now known as Colorado State University—in the Mountain States Conference (MSC) during the 1938 college football season. In their 28th season under head coach Harry W. Hughes, the Aggies compiled a 1–5–2 record (0–4–2 against MSC opponents), finished last in the MSC, and were outscored by a total of 103 to 37.

== Schedule ==
Date	Opponent	Site	Result	Attendance	Source
September 24	at Colorado Mines*	Brooks Field; Golden, CO	W 12–6		
October 1	at Wyoming	Corbett Field; Laramie, WY (rivalry)	T 0–0		
October 7	at Denver	Denver University Stadium; Denver, CO	T 0–0		
October 22	Colorado	Colorado Field; Fort Collins, CO (rivalry)	L 6–31		
October 29	Utah State^{†}	Colorado Field; Fort Collins, CO	L 0–6	4,000	
November 12	at Utah	Ute Stadium; Salt Lake City, UT	L 0–13		
November 19	BYU	Colorado Field; Fort Collins, CO	L 12–20		
November 24	at New Mexico*	University Stadium; Albuquerque, NM	L 7–27	6,500	
*Non-conference game; ^{†}Homecoming
