= 1938 Utah State Aggies football team =

American college football season

1938 Utah State Aggies football
- Conference: Mountain States Conference
- Record: 4–4 (3–3 MSC)
- Head coach: Dick Romney (20th season)
- Home stadium: Aggie Stadium

1938 Mountain States Conference football standings
	Conf.					Overall
Team	W		L		T	W		L		T
Utah $	4	–	0	–	2	7	–	1	–	2
BYU	3	–	2	–	1	4	–	3	–	1
Denver	3	–	2	–	1	4	–	4	–	1
Colorado	3	–	2	–	1	3	–	4	–	1
Utah State	3	–	3	–	0	4	–	4	–	0
Wyoming	1	–	4	–	1	2	–	5	–	1
Colorado A&M	0	–	4	–	2	1	–	5	–	2
$ – Conference champion

The 1938 Utah State Aggies football team was an American football team that represented Utah State Agricultural College in the Mountain States Conference (MSC) during the 1938 college football season. In their 20th season under head coach Dick Romney, the Aggies compiled a 4–4 record (3–3 against MSC opponents), finished fifth in the MSC, and were outscored by a total of 87 to 85.

== Schedule ==
Date	Opponent	Site	Result	Attendance	Source
October 1	College of Idaho*	Aggie Stadium; Logan, UT	W 44–6	8,000	
October 8	Colorado	Aggie Stadium; Logan, UT	W 20–0		
October 15	at Denver	DU Stadium; Denver, CO	L 0–7	8,000	
October 22	Utah	Aggie Stadium; Logan, UT (rivalry)	L 0–33	9,500	
October 29	at Colorado A&M	Colorado Field; Fort Collins, CO	W 6–0	4,000	
November 5	at BYU	Provo, UT (rivalry)	W 3–0		
November 12	Wyoming	Aggie Stadium; Logan, UT (rivalry)	L 12–27		
November 19	vs. Idaho*	Ogden Stadium; Ogden, UT	L 0–14		
*Non-conference game
