= 1938 Colorado Buffaloes football team =

American college football season

1938 Colorado Buffaloes football
- Conference: Mountain States Conference
- Record: 3–4–1 (3–2–1 MSC)
- Head coach: Bunny Oakes (4th season)
- Captain: Game captains
- Home stadium: Colorado Stadium

1938 Mountain States Conference football standings
	Conf.					Overall
Team	W		L		T	W		L		T
Utah $	4	–	0	–	2	7	–	1	–	2
BYU	3	–	2	–	1	4	–	3	–	1
Denver	3	–	2	–	1	4	–	4	–	1
Colorado	3	–	2	–	1	3	–	4	–	1
Utah State	3	–	3	–	0	4	–	4	–	0
Wyoming	1	–	4	–	1	2	–	5	–	1
Colorado A&M	0	–	4	–	2	1	–	5	–	2
$ – Conference champion

The 1938 Colorado Buffaloes football team was an American football team that represented the University of Colorado as a member of the Mountain States Conference (MSC) during the 1938 college football season. Led by fourth-year head coach Bunny Oakes, the Buffaloes compiled an overall record of 3–4–1 with a mark of 3–2–1 in conference play, tying for second place in the MSC. This was the program's first year in the MSC.

== Schedule ==
Date	Opponent	Site	Result	Attendance	Source
October 1	at Missouri*	Memorial Stadium; Columbia, MO	L 7–14	7,000	
October 8	at Utah State	Aggie Stadium; Logan, UT	L 0–20		
October 15	George Washington*	Colorado Stadium; Boulder, CO	L 0–13	8,000	
October 22	at Colorado A&M	Colorado Field; Fort Collins, CO (rivalry)	W 31–6		
October 29	Wyoming	Colorado Stadium; Boulder, CO	W 20–6	6,500	
November 5	Utah^{†}	Colorado Stadium; Boulder, CO (rivalry)	T 0–0		
November 12	BYU	Colorado Stadium; Boulder, CO	W 8–0		
November 24	at Denver	Hilltop Stadium; Denver, CO	L 12–19	25,000	
*Non-conference game; ^{†}Homecoming
