= 1938 New Mexico A&M Aggies football team =

American college football season

1938 New Mexico A&M Aggies football

Border co-champion
- Conference: Border Conference
- Record: 7–2 (4–1 Border)
- Head coach: Jerry Hines (10th season)
- Home stadium: Quesenberry Field

1938 Border Conference football standings
	Conf.					Overall
Team	W		L		T	W		L		T
New Mexico A&M +	4	–	1	–	0	7	–	2	–	0
New Mexico +	4	–	2	–	0	8	–	3	–	0
No. 11 Texas Tech	2	–	0	–	0	10	–	1	–	0
Texas Mines	3	–	2	–	0	6	–	3	–	0
Arizona State–Flagstaff	1	–	2	–	0	2	–	6	–	1
Arizona	0	–	3	–	0	3	–	6	–	0
Arizona State	0	–	4	–	0	3	–	6	–	0
+ – Conference co-champions; Rankings from AP Poll

The 1938 New Mexico A&M Aggies football team was an American football team that represented New Mexico College of Agriculture and Mechanical Arts (now known as New Mexico State University) as a member of the Border Conference during the 1938 college football season. In their tenth year under head coach Jerry Hines, the Aggies compiled a 7–2 record, was recognized as a conference co-champion, and outscored opponents by a total of 166 to 75. The team played its five home games at Quesenberry Field in Las Cruces, New Mexico.

Four of the Aggies' players were selected to the 1935 All-Border Conference football team: ends William Malcolm and Melvin Ritchey; quarterback Eddie Miller; and tackle Joe Yurcic.

== Schedule ==
Date	Opponent	Site	Result	Attendance	Source
September 23	Montana State*	Quesenberry Field; Las Cruces, NM	W 27–7		
September 30	Arkansas State Teachers*	Quesenberry Field; Las Cruces, NM	L 6–12		
October 8	at Arizona	Arizona Stadium; Tucson, AZ	W 7–6	9,000	
October 22	at Arizona State	Goodwin Stadium; Tempe, AZ	W 14–12		
October 28	Arizona State–Flagstaff	Quesenberry Field; Las Cruces, NM	W 34–0		
November 4	Silver City Teachers*	Quesenberry Field; Las Cruces, NM	W 43–7		
November 12	at New Mexico	University Stadium; Albuquerque, NM (rivalry)	L 2–6		
November 24	at Texas Mines	Kidd Field; El Paso, TX (rivalry)	W 13–9		
December 2	Drake*	Quesenberry Field; Las Cruces, NM	W 20–16		
*Non-conference game
