= 1938 BYU Cougars football team =

American college football season

1938 BYU Cougars football
- Conference: Mountain States Conference
- Record: 4–3–1 (3–2–1 MSC)
- Head coach: Eddie Kimball (2nd season)
- Home stadium: BYU Stadium

1938 Mountain States Conference football standings
	Conf.					Overall
Team	W		L		T	W		L		T
Utah $	4	–	0	–	2	7	–	1	–	2
BYU	3	–	2	–	1	4	–	3	–	1
Denver	3	–	2	–	1	4	–	4	–	1
Colorado	3	–	2	–	1	3	–	4	–	1
Utah State	3	–	3	–	0	4	–	4	–	0
Wyoming	1	–	4	–	1	2	–	5	–	1
Colorado A&M	0	–	4	–	2	1	–	5	–	2
$ – Conference champion

The 1938 BYU Cougars football team was an American football team that represented Brigham Young University (BYU) as a member of the Mountain States Conference (MSC) during the 1938 college football season. In their second season under head coach Eddie Kimball, the Cougars compiled an overall record of 4–3–1 with a mark of 3–2–1 against conference opponents, finished second in the MSC, and outscored opponents by a total of 93 to 49.

== Schedule ==
Date	Opponent	Site	Result	Attendance	Source
September 24	Arizona State–Flagstaff*	Provo, UT	W 19–0	3,500	
September 30	at Denver	DU Stadium; Denver, CO	W 20–0	14,000	
October 8	Wyoming	Provo, UT	W 24–13		
October 15	at Utah	Ute Stadium; Salt Lake City, UT (rivalry)	T 7–7		
October 22	Portland*	Provo, UT	L 3–6		
November 5	Utah State	Provo, UT (rivalry)	L 0–3		
November 12	at Colorado	Colorado Stadium; Boulder, CO	L 0–8		
November 19	at Colorado A&M	Colorado Field; Fort Collins, CO	W 20–12		
*Non-conference game
