= 1938 Arizona Wildcats football team =

American college football season

1938 Arizona Wildcats football
- Conference: Border Conference
- Record: 3–6 (0–3 Border)
- Head coach: Orian Landreth (1st season)
- Captain: George Ahee
- Home stadium: Arizona Stadium

1938 Border Conference football standings
	Conf.					Overall
Team	W		L		T	W		L		T
New Mexico A&M +	4	–	1	–	0	7	–	2	–	0
New Mexico +	4	–	2	–	0	8	–	3	–	0
No. 11 Texas Tech	2	–	0	–	0	10	–	1	–	0
Texas Mines	3	–	2	–	0	6	–	3	–	0
Arizona State–Flagstaff	1	–	2	–	0	2	–	6	–	1
Arizona	0	–	3	–	0	3	–	6	–	0
Arizona State	0	–	4	–	0	3	–	6	–	0
+ – Conference co-champions; Rankings from AP Poll

The 1938 Arizona Wildcats football team represented the University of Arizona in the Border Conference during the 1938 college football season. In their first and only season under head coach Orian Landreth, the Wildcats compiled a 3–6 record (0–3 against Border opponents), finished in fifth place in the conference, and were outscored by their opponents, 146 to 75. The team captain was George Ahee. The team played its home games at Arizona Stadium in Tucson, Arizona.

== Schedule ==
Date	Opponent	Site	Result	Attendance	Source
October 1	at SMU*	Ownby Stadium; University Park, TX	L 7–29		
October 8	New Mexico A&M	Arizona Stadium; Tucson, AZ	L 6–7	9,000	
October 15	vs. Santa Clara*	Phoenix Union High School; Phoenix, AZ	L 0–27	13,000	
October 22	at Loyola (CA)*	Gilmore Stadium; Los Angeles, CA	W 14–12	16,000	
October 29	New Mexico	Arizona Stadium; Tucson, AZ (rivalry)	L 7–20		
November 5	at Centenary*	Fairgrounds Stadium; Shreveport, LA	W 7–6	6,500	
November 11	Texas Mines	Arizona Stadium; Tucson, AZ	L 14–26		
November 19	Marquette*	Arizona Stadium; Tucson, AZ	W 20–12	10,000	
November 24	Montana*	Arizona Stadium; Tucson, AZ	L 0–7	9,000	
*Non-conference game
