= Ted Shipkey =

American football player and coach (1904–1978)

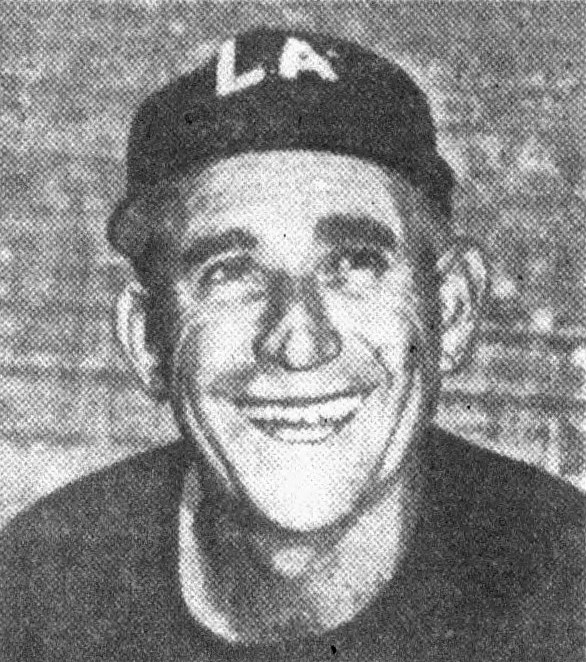
- Shipkey, c. 1947

Biographical details
- Born: September 28, 1904; Montana, U.S.
- Died: July 18, 1978 (aged 73); Placentia, California, U.S.

Playing career

Football
- 1924–1926: Stanford
- Position: End

Coaching career (HC unless noted)

Football
- 1927–1929: Sacramento Junior College (assistant)
- 1930–1932: Arizona State
- 1937–1941: New Mexico
- 1942–1943: Albuquerque AAB / Kirland Field
- 1945: Personnel Distribution Command
- 1946–1948: Los Angeles Dons (ends)
- 1949–1951: Montana

Basketball
- 1927–1930: Sacramento Junior College
- 1930–1933: Arizona State

Administrative career (AD unless noted)
- 1930–1932: Arizona State

Head coaching record
- Overall: 57–52–4 (college football); 32–30 (college basketball); 42–14 (junior college basketball)
- Bowls: 0–1

Accomplishments and honors

Championships
- Football; 2 Border (1931, 1938)

Awards
- First-team All-American (1926); Second-team All-American (1925); 2× First-team All-PCC (1925, 1926); Second-team All-PCC (1924)

Theodore E. Shipkey (September 28, 1904 – July 18, 1978) was an American football player, coach of football and basketball, and college athletics administrator. Playing football at Stanford University from 1924 to 1926, he was a two-time All-American selection. Shipkey served as head football coach at Arizona State Teachers College at Tempe—now known as Arizona State University—from 1930 to 1932, the University of New Mexico from 1937 to 1941, and the University of Montana from 1949 to 1951. He was also the head basketball coach at Arizona State from 1930 to 1933, tallying a mark of 32–30.

== Playing career ==
Shipkey played end for Stanford under Pop Warner, and was an All-American in 1925 and 1926. He played in two Rose Bowls, and scored Stanford's only touchdowns in both the 1925 Rose Bowl, which Stanford lost to Notre Dame, 27–10, and the 1927 Rose Bowl, which ended in a 7–7 tie with Alabama.

== Coaching career ==
From 1930 to 1932, he coached at Arizona State, and compiled a 13–10–2 record. From 1937 to 1941 he coached at New Mexico, where he compiled a 30–17–2 record. From 1949 to 1951, he coached at Montana, where he compiled a 12–16 record.

== Death ==
Shipkey died on July 18, 1978, in Placentia, California, after suffering from Parkinson's disease.

== Head coaching record ==
=== College football ===
Year	Team	Overall	Conference	Standing	Bowl/playoffs
Arizona State Bulldogs (Independent) (1930)
1930	Arizona State	3–5–1			
Arizona State Bulldogs (Border Conference) (1931–1932)
1931	Arizona State	6–2	3–0	1st	
1932	Arizona State	4–3–1	2–2	T–3rd	
Arizona State:		13–10–2	5–2		
New Mexico Lobos (Border Conference) (1937–1941)
1937	New Mexico	4–4–1	2–3–1	5th	
1938	New Mexico	8–3	4–2	T–1st	L Sun
1939	New Mexico	8–2	4–2	2nd	
1940	New Mexico	5–4	4–2	4th	
1941	New Mexico	5–4–1	3–2–1	5th	
New Mexico:		26–17–2	17–11–2		
Albuquerque Army Air Base / Kirtland Field Flying Kellys (Independent) (1942–1943)
1942	Albuquerque AAB	5–4			
1943	Kirtland Field	1–2			
Albuquerque AAB / Kirtland Field:		6–6			
Personnel Distribution Command Comets (Army Air Forces League) (1945)
1945	Personnel Distribution Command	0–3 (Note: Shipkey served as head coach of the Personnel Distribution Command Comets for the first three games of the 1945 season, until his discharge from the military. He was succeeded by Wally Marks, who led the team for the remainder of the year. The Comets finished the season with an overall record of 6–5 and a mark of 2–4 league play, placing sixth in the Army Air Forces League.)	0–2		
Personnel Distribution Command:		0–3	0–2		
Montana Grizzlies (Pacific Coast Conference) (1949)
1949	Montana	5–4	0–3	10th	
Montana Grizzlies (Independent) (1950)
1950	Montana	5–5			
Montana Grizzlies (Skyline Conference) (1951)
1951	Montana	2–7	1–4	8th	
Montana:		12–16	1–7		
Total:		57–52–4			
National championship Conference title Conference division title or championship game berth
