= Widtsoe, Utah =

- Ghost town
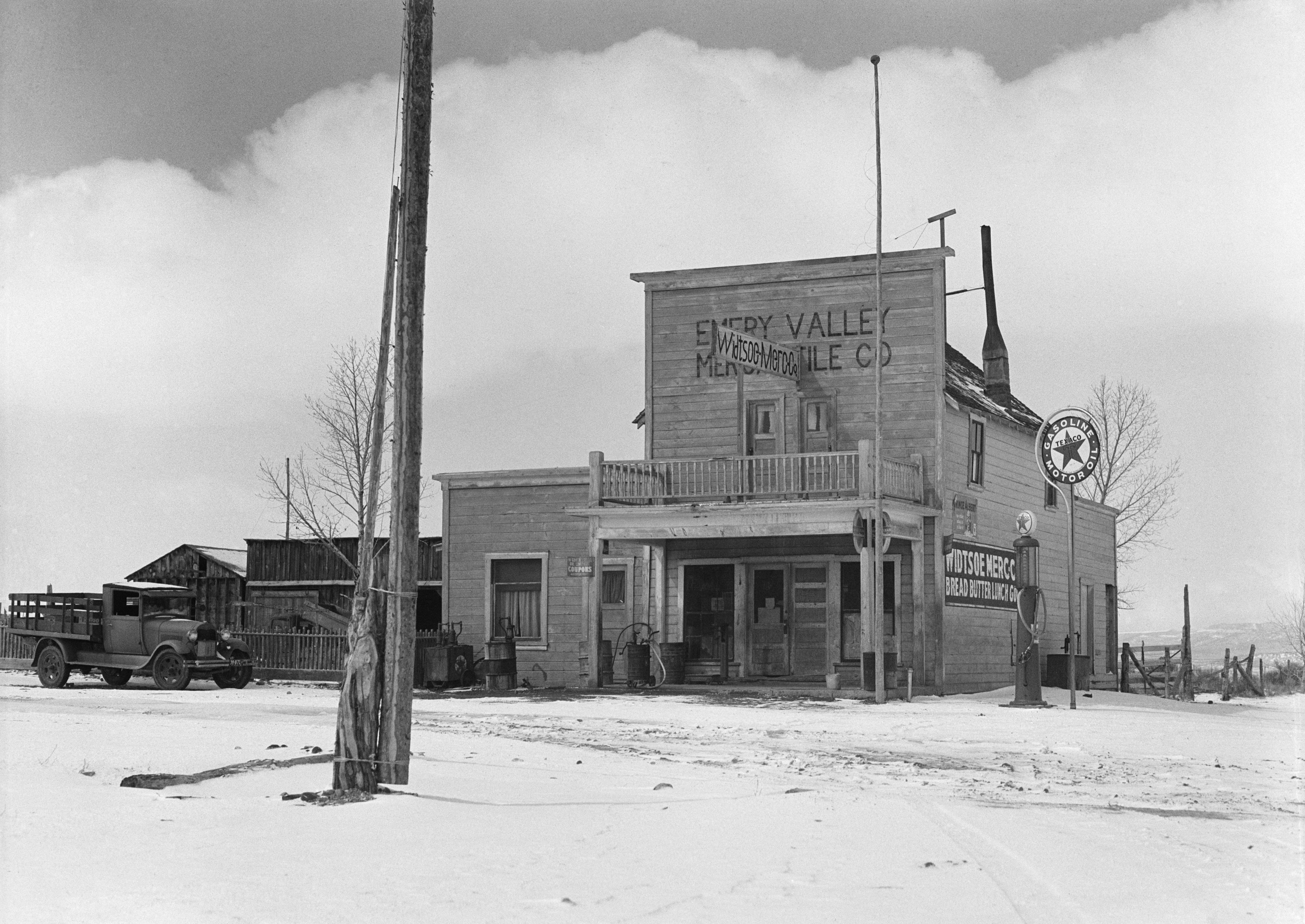
- Emery Valley Mercantile Co. store in Widtsoe, 1936

- Location within Utah Location within the United States
- Coordinates: 37°49′56″N 111°59′44″W
- Country: United States
- State: Utah
- County: Garfield
- Established: 1908
- Abandoned: 1936
- Named for: John A. Widtsoe
- Elevation: 7,605 ft (2,318 m)
- GNIS feature ID: 1447328

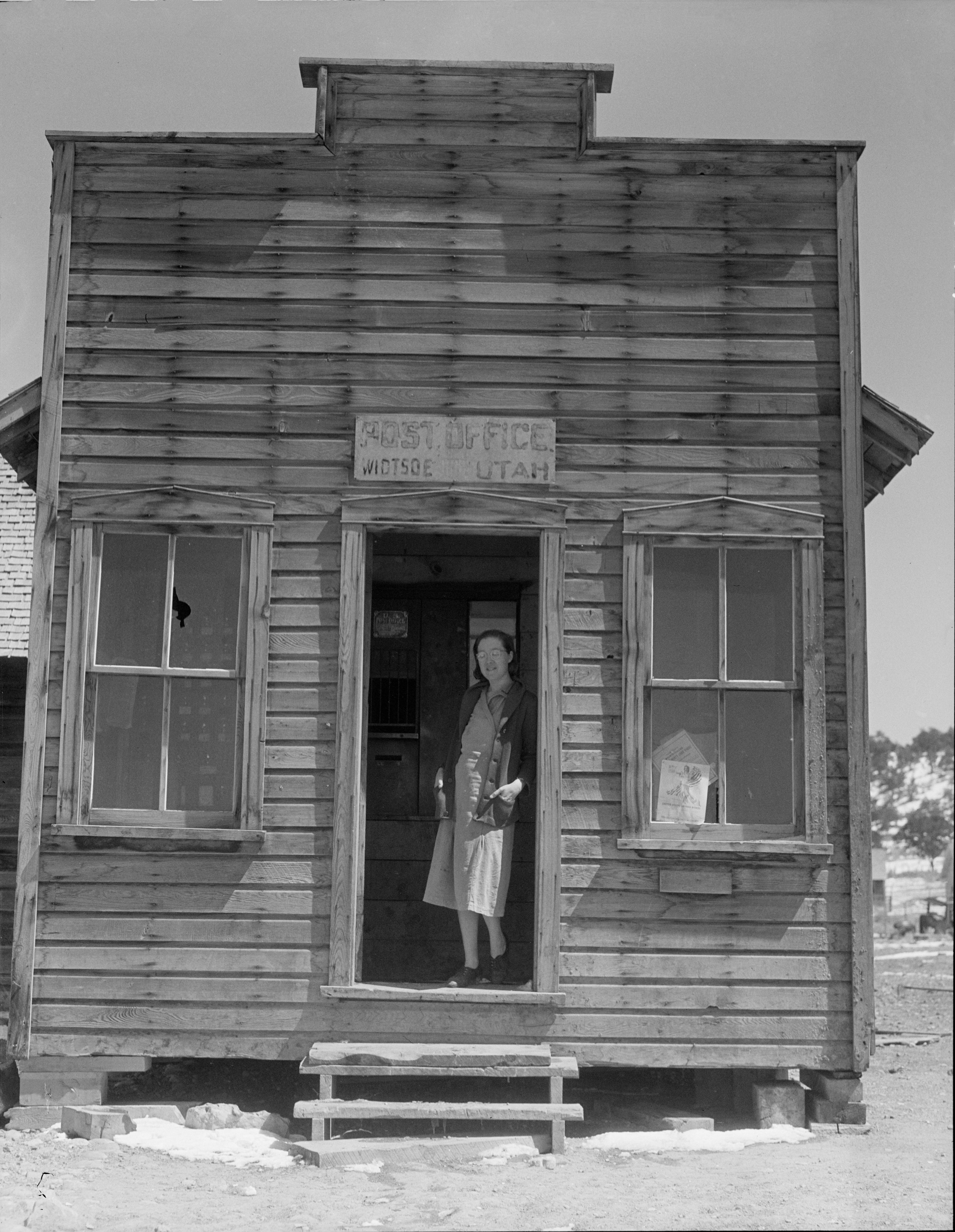
Post office and postmistress, Widtsoe. 1936 photo by Dorothea Lange.

Widtsoe (/ˈwɪtsoʊ/) is a ghost town in Garfield County, Utah, United States. Located in Johns Valley northeast of Bryce Canyon and along the Sevier River at the mouth of Sweetwater Creek, the town existed from about 1908 to 1936.

== History ==
The first settlers, including Isaac Riddle and a wife of John D. Lee, came to Johns Valley as early as 1876. The Riddle ranch became an important regrouping point for the San Juan Expedition in 1879, but through the end of the 19th century the area was mainly used by local cattlemen to seasonally run their stock. There were few permanent residents.

In the early 1900s Jedediah Adair bought land here and started growing oats, wheat, and barley. His success attracted other settlers, and by 1908 the community became known as Adairville. As the settlement continued to expand, it was renamed Houston for John Houston, president of the Church of Jesus Christ of Latter-day Saints's local stake in Panguitch. In 1910, Adair's wife Julia donated 40 acres (0.16 km^{2}) of land for the development of an official townsite. The town was divided into blocks 20 rods (330 ft; 100 m) square with 4 lots per block and streets 5 rods (83 ft; 25 m) wide. The new town was granted a post office in 1912, and its name changed again to Winder, in honor of recently deceased Latter-day Saint leader John R. Winder.

Winder began to thrive and prosper. Sawmills were built in the canyon east of town to provide lumber for fast-paced construction. Besides the houses there was a combination church and school, two hotels, four stores, and a confectionery plant. In 1917 the post office decided there were too many places in Utah named Winder, and suggested yet another name change. The name Widtsoe was chosen to recognize John A. Widtsoe, then president of the University of Utah and an agricultural scientist whose expertise in dry farming had been very helpful to area farmers.

Widtsoe continued to grow, becoming one of the principal communities in Garfield County. In 1919 the United States Forest Service relocated its district office from Panguitch to Widtsoe, and there was even serious discussion of moving the county seat there. In 1920 the population reached 1,100. Residents prepared for further expansion, enlarging nearby Pine Lake and building an embankment dam to supply more irrigation water.

=== Decline ===
The town's fortunes began to change in the summer of 1920, when a severe drought threatened the crops. Rain finally came late in the season and produced a good grain harvest, but the drought continued the next year. Widtsoe's volatile climate started to drive farmers away. In 1924, as the drought wore on, William F. Holt, who had been successful in irrigating California's Imperial Valley, came to try Johns Valley. Holt established a creamery in the valley, as well as a storage pond and flume to bring water down 7 miles (11 km) from Pine Lake. This venture, in which he invested hundreds of thousands of dollars, was ultimately a failure. Observers noticed an apparent twenty-year cycle of alternate drought and abundant water in Johns Valley, and it seemed the drought period was just getting started. Soon the only successful crop was a high-altitude variety of lettuce.

In 1925 the Forest Service office was moved away, and Widtsoe went into serious decline. By 1930 the population had dropped to 210, and in 1935 there were only 17 families left in town. In 1936 the federal Resettlement Administration stepped in to buy out local landowners, freeing them from unproductive land and delinquent taxes. The intention was to relocate inhabitants to more productive areas and use the land as a public grazing area. Unfortunately, the administration was inefficient and slow. The cost of administering the program was more than twice the amount paid out to purchase the land, and transactions that were supposed to last weeks took many months. Finally Widtsoe was emptied out. Government workers tore down most of the buildings and placed over 26,000 acres (110 km^{2}) under the provisions of the Taylor Grazing Act. A few houses and an old community building still stand on the site.

== Climate ==
The climate in this area has mild differences between highs and lows, and there is adequate rainfall year-round. According to the Köppen Climate Classification system, Widtsoe has a marine west coast climate, abbreviated "Cfb" on climate maps.

== See also ==
- List of ghost towns in Utah
