= Bill Weeks =

American football player and coach (1929–2006)

Biographical details
- Born: October 20, 1929; Hampton, Iowa, U.S.
- Died: May 2, 2006 (aged 76); Albuquerque, New Mexico, U.S.

Playing career
- 1948–1950: Iowa State
- Position: Quarterback

Coaching career (HC unless noted)
- 1954–1955: Grinnell HS (IA)
- 1956–1957: New Mexico (ends)
- 1958–1959: New Mexico (backfield)
- 1960–1967: New Mexico

Head coaching record
- Overall: 40–41–1 (college); 9–8–1 (high school)

Accomplishments and honors

Championships
- 3 WAC (1962–1964)

Awards
- 2× First-team All-Big Seven (1949, 1950)

William Weeks (October 20, 1929 – May 2, 2006) was an American football player and coach. He served as the head football coach at the University of New Mexico from 1960 to 1967, compiling a record of 40–41–1. Weeks was an All-Big Seven Conference quarterback at Iowa State University in 1949 and 1950. He played in the East–West Shrine Game and the Hula Bowl following the 1950 season. He was drafted by the Philadelphia Eagles in the eighteenth round of the 1951 NFL draft. Weeks died at the age of 76 on May 2, 2006, in Albuquerque, New Mexico.

== Head coaching record ==
=== College ===
Year	Team	Overall	Conference	Standing	Bowl/playoffs	Coaches^{#}
New Mexico Lobos (Skyline Conference) (1960–1961)
1960	New Mexico	5–5	4–2	4th		
1961	New Mexico	7–4	3–3	T–3rd	W Aviation	
New Mexico Lobos (Western Athletic Conference) (1962–1967)
1962	New Mexico	7–2–1	2–1–1	1st		
1963	New Mexico	6–4	3–1	1st		
1964	New Mexico	9–2	3–1	T–1st		16
1965	New Mexico	3–7	2–3	4th		
1966	New Mexico	2–8	0–5	6th		
1967	New Mexico	1–9	0–5	6th		
New Mexico:		40–41–1	17–21–1			
Total:		40–41–1				
National championship Conference title Conference division title or championship game berth
^{#}Rankings from final Coaches Poll.
