= University of New Mexico football, 1892–1899 =

American college football seasons

The University of New Mexico football program from 1892 to 1899 represented the University of New Mexico in its first decade of intercollegiate football.

== 1892 ==
1892 University of New Mexico football
- Conference: Independent
- Record: 0–2
- Head coach: None
- Captain: S. F. Jenkins

The 1892 University of New Mexico football team was an American football team represented the University of New Mexico as an independent during the 1892 college football season. The team compiled a 0–2 record. S. F. Jenkins was the team captain.

=== Schedule ===
Date	Opponent	Site	Result	Source
October 7	Albuquerque High School	Albuquerque, NM	L 0–5	
October 28	Albuquerque High School	Albuquerque, NM	L 0–8	

== 1893 ==
1893 University of New Mexico football
- Conference: Independent
- Record: 3–1
- Head coach: None
- Captain: Frederick O. Whiteman

The 1893 University of New Mexico football team was an American football team represented the University of New Mexico as an independent during the 1893 college football season. The team compiled a 3–1 record. Frederick O. Whiteman was the team captain.

=== Schedule ===
Date	Opponent	Site	Result	Source
November 18	Albuquerque High School	Albuquerque, NM	W 4–0	
November 30	Albuquerque Indian School	Albuquerque, NM	L 4–10	
December 25	Albuquerque town team	Albuquerque, NM	W 6–0	
January 1, 1894	New Mexico A&M	Albuquerque, NM (rivalry)	W 25–5 (Note: New Mexico cites the final score as 25–5, while New Mexico A&M cites the final as 18–6.)	

== 1894 ==
1894 University of New Mexico football
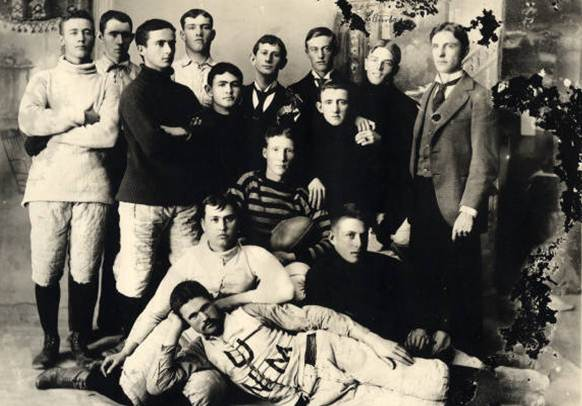
- Conference: Independent
- Record: 1–1–1
- Head coach: William A. Zimmer (1st season)
- Captain: Frederick O. Whiteman

The 1894 University of New Mexico football team was an American football team represented the University of New Mexico as an independent during the 1894 college football season. The team compiled a 1–1–1 record. William A. Zimmer was the coach, and Frederick O. Whiteman was the team captain.

=== Schedule ===
Date	Opponent	Site	Result	Source
October 27	Albuquerque Indian School	Albuquerque, NM	L 0–4	
November 10	Albuquerque Indian School	Albuquerque, NM	T 0–0	
November 29	Albuquerque Indian School	Albuquerque, NM	W 26–4	

== 1895–1898 ==
No varsity team

== 1899 ==
1899 University of New Mexico football
- Conference: Independent
- Record: 1–1
- Head coach: None
- Captain: Louie Benjamin

The 1899 University of New Mexico football team was an American football team represented the University of New Mexico as an independent during the 1899 college football season. The team compiled a 1–1 record. Louie Benjamin was the team captain.

=== Schedule ===
Date	Opponent	Site	Result	Source
November 11	Albuquerque High School	Albuquerque, NM	W 5–0	
November 30	Albuquerque High School	Albuquerque, NM	L 0–5	
