= 1938 Utah Utes football team =

American college football season

1938 Utah Utes football

MSC champion Sun Bowl champion

Sun Bowl, W 26–0 vs. New Mexico
- Conference: Mountain States Conference
- Record: 7–1–2 (4–0–2 MSC)
- Head coach: Ike Armstrong (14th season)
- Home stadium: Ute Stadium

1938 Mountain States Conference football standings
	Conf.					Overall
Team	W		L		T	W		L		T
Utah $	4	–	0	–	2	7	–	1	–	2
BYU	3	–	2	–	1	4	–	3	–	1
Denver	3	–	2	–	1	4	–	4	–	1
Colorado	3	–	2	–	1	3	–	4	–	1
Utah State	3	–	3	–	0	4	–	4	–	0
Wyoming	1	–	4	–	1	2	–	5	–	1
Colorado A&M	0	–	4	–	2	1	–	5	–	2
$ – Conference champion

The 1938 Utah Utes football team was an American football team that represented the University of Utah as a member of the Mountain States Conference (MSC) during the 1938 college football season. In their 14th season under head coach Ike Armstrong, the Utes compiled an overall record of 7–1–2 with a mark of 4–0–2 in conference play, won the MSC championship, defeated New Mexico in the 1939 Sun Bowl, and outscored all opponents by a total of 187 to 36.

Tackle Barney McGarry was the team captain. McGarry was also selected by the Central Press as a first-team player on the 1938 All-America team. Four players won all-conference honors: McGarry; end Bruce Balkan; center Ernest Baldwin; and halfback Paul Snow.

== Schedule ==
Date	Opponent	Site	Result	Attendance	Source
October 1	Montana State*	Ute Stadium; Salt Lake City, UT	W 34–0		
October 15	BYU	Ute Stadium; Salt Lake City, UT (rivalry)	T 7–7		
October 22	at Utah State	Aggie Stadium; Logan, UT (rivalry)	W 33–0	9,500	
October 29	Denver	Ute Stadium; Salt Lake City, UT	W 21–0		
November 5	at Colorado	Colorado Stadium; Boulder, CO (rivalry)	T 0–0		
November 12	Colorado A&M^{†}	Ute Stadium; Salt Lake City, UT	W 13–0		
November 19	at Wyoming	Corbett Field; Laramie, WY	W 39–0	3,500	
November 24	Idaho*	Ute Stadium; Salt Lake City, UT (on Thanksgiving)	L 0–16	15,000	
December 17	at Hawaii*	Honolulu Stadium; Honolulu, Territory of Hawaii	W 14–13	17,500	
January 2	vs. New Mexico*	Kidd Field; El Paso, TX (Sun Bowl)	W 26–0	13,000	
*Non-conference game; ^{†}Homecoming

== NFL draft ==
Utah had one player selected in the 1939 NFL draft.

Player	Position	Round	Pick	NFL team
Barnie McGarry	Guard	6	43	Cleveland Rams
