= Aviation Bowl =

1961 Aviation Bowl
New Mexico Lobos	Western Michigan Broncos
(6–4)	(5–3–1)
28	12
Head coach: Bill Weeks	Head coach: Merle Schlosser
	1	2	3	4	Total
New Mexico	14	0	14	0	28
Western Michigan	6	0	0	6	12
- Date: December 9, 1961
- Season: 1961
- Stadium: Welcome Stadium
- Location: Dayton, Ohio
- MVP: RB Bobby Santiago; G Chuck Cummings
- Attendance: 3,694

The Aviation Bowl was a post-season college football bowl game played at Welcome Stadium in Dayton, Ohio, on December 9, 1961, between the New Mexico Lobos and the Western Michigan Broncos. New Mexico won by a score of 28 to 12. Attendance for the game was 3,694.

== Background ==
The Lobos finished tied for third for Mountain States Conference in their final season in the conference. The Broncos had finished tied for second in the Mid-American Conference. This was New Mexico's first bowl game since the 1947 Harbor Bowl and Western Michigan's first ever bowl game. Rutgers and The Citadel were asked to play in the game, but they both declined. Bowling Green was considered to play, but they instead played in the Mercy Bowl, a fundraiser in memory of the members of the Cal Poly team members that died the year before, after playing Bowling Green. Ohio was in the running as well, but they tied their last game against Western Michigan, 20–20. The two inch snowfall that fell prior to the game turned to sleet during the game, making the field wet.

== Game summary ==
- New Mexico - Cromartie 3 yard touchdown run (kick blocked)
- New Mexico - Santiago 10 yard touchdown run (Morgan run)
- Western Michigan - White 4 yard touchdown run (run failed)
- New Mexico - Morgan 10 yard touchdown run (run failed)
- New Mexico - Cummings 43 yard interception for touchdown (Bradford run)
- Western Michigan - Cooke 5 yard touchdown pass from Chlebek (pass failed)

== Statistics ==
Statistics	New Mexico	Western Michigan
First downs	20	18
Rushing yards	339	96
Passing yards	0	207
Total yards	339	303
Passing	0-3-0	18-33-2
Fumbles-Lost	2-0	4-3
Penalties-Yards	10-90	4-30
Punts-Average	7-33.3	4-36.0

== Aftermath ==
New Mexico did not win another bowl game until the 2007 New Mexico Bowl.

== Game officials ==
Name	Position
Robert R. (Bob) Baur	Field judge

== See also ==
- List of college bowl games
