= 1939 Sun Bowl =

American college football game

- 5th Sun Bowl
Utah Utes	New Mexico Lobos
(6–1–2)	(8–2)
Mountain States	Border Conference
26	0
Head coach: Ike Armstrong	Head coach: Ted Shipkey
	1	2	3	4	Total
Utah	14	6	0	6	26
New Mexico	0	0	0	0	0
- Date: January 2, 1939
- Season: 1938
- Stadium: Kidd Field
- Location: El Paso, Texas
- Referee: Cooper Kinney
- Attendance: 13,000

This fifth annual Sun Bowl featured the Utah Utes and the New Mexico Lobos in a postseason bowl game for both teams and the final game of the 1938 college football season.

== Background ==
New Mexico was champion of the Border Conference while Utah was champion of the Mountain States Conference. The game was touted as the most evenly matched of the five major bowl games of the 1938 season. This was also the first meeting between the two schools and the first bowl game for either school.

== Game summary ==
Nevertheless, the Utes dominated from the start, scoring three first-half touchdowns, with a Tom Pace touchdown run and two Ray Peterson touchdowns, including a 1-yard run on fourth-down. In the second half, New Mexico had numerous opportunities to close the gap following Utah turnovers but their aerial attack couldn't capitalize, being held to 59 yards passing and four interceptions, not even reaching Utah's 40 the whole game. Utah, on the other hand, racked up 366 yards rushing, and outgained the Lobos 384–212, adding in a Clarance Gehrke touchdown late to make the final score 26–0, the first ever shutout in Sun Bowl history.

=== Scoring summary ===
First quarter

- Utah: Tom Pace 15-yard run (Bernard McGarry kick)
- Utah: Ray Peterson 60-yard interception return (Bernard McGarry kick)

Second quarter

- Utah: Ray Peterson 1-yard run (kick failed)

Fourth quarter

- Utah: Clarence Gehrke 10-yard run (kick failed)

== Statistics ==
Statistics	New Mexico	Utah
First downs	12	16
Rushing yards	179	379
Passing yards	59	18
Passing	4–11–4	1–4–1
Total offense	212	384
Fumbles–lost	3–1	1–1
Penalties–yards	5–35	9–55
Punts–average	9–40.8	8–30.5

== Aftermath ==
New Mexico returned to the Sun Bowl twice in the next decade (1944 and 1946). Utah did not return to the Sun Bowl until 2011.
