= 1938 New Mexico Lobos football team =

American college football season

1938 New Mexico Lobos football

Border co-champion

Sun Bowl, L 0–26 vs. Utah
- Conference: Border Conference
- Record: 8–3 (4–2 Border)
- Head coach: Ted Shipkey (2nd season)
- Home stadium: University Stadium

1938 Border Conference football standings
	Conf.					Overall
Team	W		L		T	W		L		T
New Mexico A&M +	4	–	1	–	0	7	–	2	–	0
New Mexico +	4	–	2	–	0	8	–	3	–	0
No. 11 Texas Tech	2	–	0	–	0	10	–	1	–	0
Texas Mines	3	–	2	–	0	6	–	3	–	0
Arizona State–Flagstaff	1	–	2	–	0	2	–	6	–	1
Arizona	0	–	3	–	0	3	–	6	–	0
Arizona State	0	–	4	–	0	3	–	6	–	0
+ – Conference co-champions; Rankings from AP Poll

The 1938 New Mexico Lobos football team represented the University of New Mexico as a member of the Border Conference during the 1938 college football season. In their second season under head coach Ted Shipkey, the Lobos compiled an overall record of 8–3 record with a mark of 4–2 against conference opponents, shared the Border Conference championship with New Mexico A&M, lost to Utah in the 1939 Sun Bowl, and outscored all opponents by a total of 199 to 72.

== Schedule ==
Date	Opponent	Site	Result	Attendance	Source
September 23	Silver City Teachers*	University Stadium; Albuquerque, NM	W 40–0	5,500	
September 30	Arizona State	University Stadium; Albuquerque, NM	W 21–0		
October 7	Colorado College*	University Stadium; Albuquerque, NM	W 45–0		
October 15	at Texas Mines	Kidd Field; El Paso, TX	L 6–7	7,000	
October 22	at Arizona State–Flagstaff	Skidmore Field; Flagstaff, AZ	W 20–0		
October 29	at Arizona	Arizona Stadium; Tucson, AZ (rivalry)	W 20–7		
November 5	Denver*	University Stadium; Albuquerque, NM	W 7–6	6,000	
November 12	New Mexico A&M^{†}	University Stadium; Albuquerque, NM (rivalry)	W 6–2		
November 19	No. 19 Texas Tech	University Stadium; Albuquerque, NM	L 7–17	6,500	
November 24	Colorado A&M	University Stadium; Albuquerque, NM	W 27–7	6,500	
January 2, 1939	vs. Utah*	Kidd Field; El Paso, TX (Sun Bowl)	L 0–26	13,000	
*Non-conference game; ^{†}Homecoming; Rankings from Coaches' Poll released prior to the game
